= Scotch Whisky Association =

Trade organisation that represents the Scotch whisky industry

- Abbreviation: SWA
- Formation: April 1942
- Legal status: Non-profit organisation (limited liability company registered in Edinburgh)
- Purpose: Promoting and protecting the Scotch whisky industry
- Location: Edinburgh, Scotland, UK
- Region served: Worldwide
- Members: 138 Scotch whisky producers
- Chairman: Scott McCroskie
- Chief Executive: Mark Kent
- Main organ: SWA Council
- Website: www.scotch-whisky.org.uk

The Scotch Whisky Association (SWA) is a trade organisation that represents the Scotch whisky industry based in Edinburgh, Scotland. The Scotch whisky industry is an important part of the Scottish economy, and particularly the Scottish export market.

== Membership ==
Members include (among others):

- Chivas Brothers
- Diageo
- Drambuie Liqueur Company
- Highland Distillers
- John Dewar & Sons
- International Beverage Holdings
- John Haig & Co.
- John Walker & Sons
- Scotch Malt Whisky Society
- The Edrington Group
- Suntory Global Spirits
- Tomatin distillery
- Whyte and Mackay
- William Grant & Sons
- William Teacher & Sons

== Purpose ==
The SWA's stated purpose is to promote, protect and represent the interests of the whisky industry in Scotland and around the world. Similar to the Portman Group, it also promotes responsible drinking, with campaigns to curb drinking to excess.

== History ==
It was formed on 17 April 1942. It became a limited company in 1960. The SWA's members represent over 95% of Scotch whisky production, which encompasses over 2,500 brands around the world.

The SWA led an unsuccessful challenge to the Scottish government's minimum alcohol price policy, enshrined in the Alcohol (Minimum Pricing) (Scotland) Act 2012. The UK's Supreme Court ruled on 15 November 2017 that the Act was not disproportionate to the stated policy aim of reducing alcohol misuse and overconsumption, and therefore not contrary to EU law. Karen Betts, the SWA chief executive, said the association "accept[s] the Supreme Court's ruling".

== Achievements ==
Scotch whisky has been a major industry for decades with exports totalling £4.7 billion in 2018, according to the Association. Whisky tourism is a side-benefit with distilleries being the third most visited attractions in Scotland, according to the Association of Leading Visitor Attractions. Some 2 million visits were recorded in 2018, a 6.1% increase over 2017 and a 56% increase compared to 2010. Some 68 distilleries operate visitor centres in Scotland and another eight accept visits by appointment. Hotels, restaurants and other facilities also benefit from the millions of pounds spent by tourists.

The tourism has been a real plus to the economy, and of significant value especially in remote, rural areas, according to Fiona Hyslop MSP, Cabinet Secretary for Culture, Tourism and External Affairs. "The Scottish Government is committed to working with partners like the Scotch Whisky Association to increase our tourism offer and encourage more people to visit our distilleries," the Secretary added.

== See also ==
- List of whisky brands
- Scotch Whisky Research Institute
