= Glenrothes (disambiguation) =

The name Glenrothes refers to:

- Glenrothes, Fife, one of Scotland's new towns
- Glenrothes (UK Parliament constituency), a constituency represented in the British House of Commons
- The Glenrothes, a single malt whisky
