= North British distillery =

Whisky distillery in Edinburgh, Scotland

Coordinates: 55°56′24.46″N 3°14′8.17″W

The North British Distillery Company Ltd.
- Type: Private
- Industry: Distillery, Scotch whisky
- Founded: 1885
- Founder: Andrew Usher, William Sanderson, John M. Crabbie
- Headquarters: Edinburgh, Scotland, UK
- Products: Pure grain alcohol
- Owner: Lothian Distillers Ltd.
- Number of employees: 275
- Website: www.thenorthbritish.co.uk

The North British Distillery is a grain whisky distillery located in the Gorgie area of Edinburgh, Scotland.

Established by a group of independent distillers in 1885, it is now owned by Lothian Distillers Ltd, a joint venture company owned by Diageo and Edrington Group, each with a 50% share in the business.

== History ==
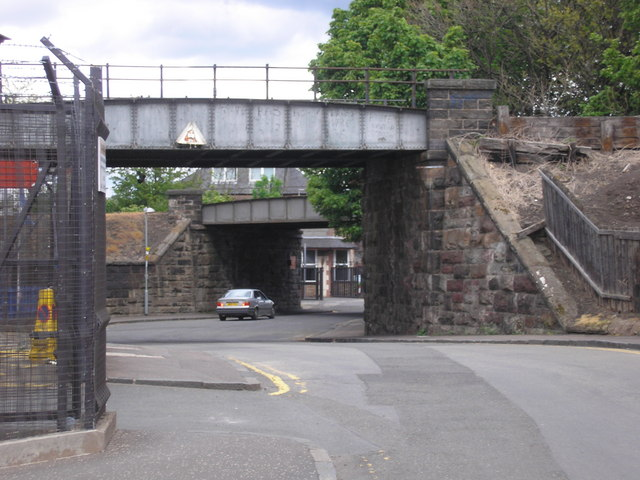
The conglomeration of railway lines around the entrance (located under the second bridge) to the North British Distillery in Wheatfield Road, Gorgie

With grain whisky consumption growing in the industrialised and railway connected Victorian era, independent distillers needed access to a high quality and high volume producer of pure grain alcohol.

In 1885, major shareholders Andrew Usher, William Sanderson and John M. Crabbie, with numerous other whisky-blenders as shareholders, had established the North British Distillery Company Limited. The company bought a 10 acres (4.0 ha) pig farm on the western outskirts of Edinburgh, adjacent to the developing suburb of Gorgie and Dalry. The site had a number of distinct advantages:

- Direct access to the developing national railway network via the Edinburgh Suburban and Southside Junction Railway, allowing input access for grain and output distribution of product
- Close access to the Port of Leith, allowing easy import of grain and later maize
- The new main city sewer ran less than 100 yards (91 m) from the site, allowing easy flushout of effluent

Production started in 1887, and within a year of opening the distillery was producing 3,600,000 litres (790,000 imp gal; 950,000 US gal) of spirit per year, output at a price of one shilling and three pence per proof gallon. By the start of World War I, production had risen to 9,000,000 litres (2,000,000 imp gal; 2,400,000 US gal) per annum, but came to a halt in 1917 due to a lack of economic supply of grain. Almost converted to acetone production for use in munitions, the site resumed production in 1920. Having reached pre-war production levels by 1925, with prohibition in the United States, followed by the 1930s Great Depression, production fell to an all-time low of 1,200,000 litres (260,000 imp gal; 320,000 US gal) per annum. Production had barely recovered to similar post-World War I levels by the start of World War II, which again saw production suspended. The site was used initially as a grain store, and latterly as a D Day supplies depot.

Just after resumption of production, in 1948 Scotland's first saladin maltings were installed. With rationing ending in the early 1950s, this spurred production to pre-World War I levels again. In the late 1950s the site was expanded to include the adjacent former Edinburgh Corporation Tramways depot, to provide space for new warehouses. In 1967, the Darney quarry at East Woodburn, Northumberland was reopened to allow an extension to the buildings in the original stone, and kept open for two years to allow additional offices and brewing facilities to be added.

In 1970, 30 acres (12 ha) of land were purchased at Addiewell, West Lothian to create six racked warehouses and a filling store, added to by an additional three racked warehouses in 1975. That same year an additional 30 acres (12 ha) adjacent plot was purchased on the opposite (south) side of the A71 road. At this time, expansion of output was enabled by investment in production facilities enabling 36,400,000 litres (8,000,000 imp gal; 9,600,000 US gal) to be produced in 1979.

The late 1970s/early 1980s downturn brought job losses, as production capacity had been planned on a 10% year-on-year increase. After output fell to 11,400,000 litres (2,500,000 imp gal; 3,000,000 US gal), the economic revival brought consolidation across Scotch whisky production, and resulted in the 1988 closure of the Caledonian, Edinburgh's other grain distillery. Hence by 1991, output had recovered to 41,700,000 litres (9,200,000 imp gal; 11,000,000 US gal).

In 1993, shareholders Robertson & Baxter and International Distillers & Vintners formed joint venture company Lothian Distillers, which bought out all other shareholders for an agreed price of £84 million. After the completion of the replacement of the exploded No.4 still, an expansion plan allowed the production of a grain-neutral spirit to support IDV's Smirnoff vodka brand, and maximum plant capacity to rise to 61,600,000 litres (13,600,000 imp gal; 16,300,000 US gal).

Rationalisation led to the sale of the maltings and warehouse site on Slateford Road and the Westfield Road warehousing site in 2002 and 2003 respectively. The vast majority of maturation warehousing is at Addiewell where a further four warehouses have been built since 2002, on the site bought in 1975.

== Current ==
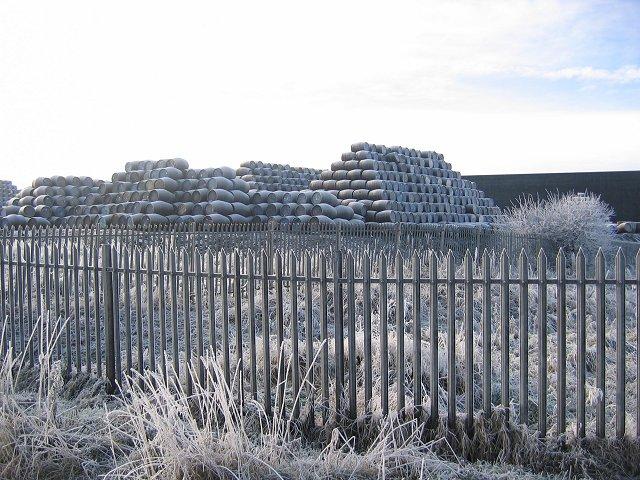
A bonded warehouse in Addiewell for the North British Distillery

Lothian Distillers, and hence the sites and production, is jointly owned by Diageo and Edrington Group. Increased sales of Scotch whisky to India, China and South America brought about production of 65,000,000 litres (14,000,000 imp gal; 17,000,000 US gal) in 2007, produced for:

- Diageo: constituent of blended whiskies, including Johnnie Walker whisky
- Edrington: constituent of blended whiskies, including Famous Grouse whisky

To enable this, the company imports maize (3,000 tonnes (3,300 tons) per week from France via the Port of Leith), along with a lesser amount of malted barley. The waste output husks are pelletised into cattle-feed.

== See also ==
- Scotch Whisky Research Institute
