= The Famous Grouse =

Brand of Scotch whisky

- Type: Blended whisky
- Manufacturer: William Grant & Sons
- Origin: Scotland
- Introduced: 1896
- Alcohol by volume: 40%
- Variants: The Famous Grouse Smoky Black; The Snow Grouse; The Famous Grouse Sherry Cask Finish
- Website: The Famous Grouse

The Famous Grouse is a brand of blended Scotch whisky produced by William Grant & Sons in Scotland. It was first produced by Matthew Gloag & Son in 1896. The single malt whiskies used in The Famous Grouse blend include the Edrington-owned Highland Park and The Glenrothes. Its emblem is the red grouse, Scotland's national game bird.

It has been the highest-selling whisky brand in Scotland since 1980, although Bell's is not far behind in second place. As a standard price blended Scotch whisky, its main competitors in its home market are Grant's, Bell's and Teacher's. The majority of its sales in the United Kingdom are during the Christmas period.

== History ==
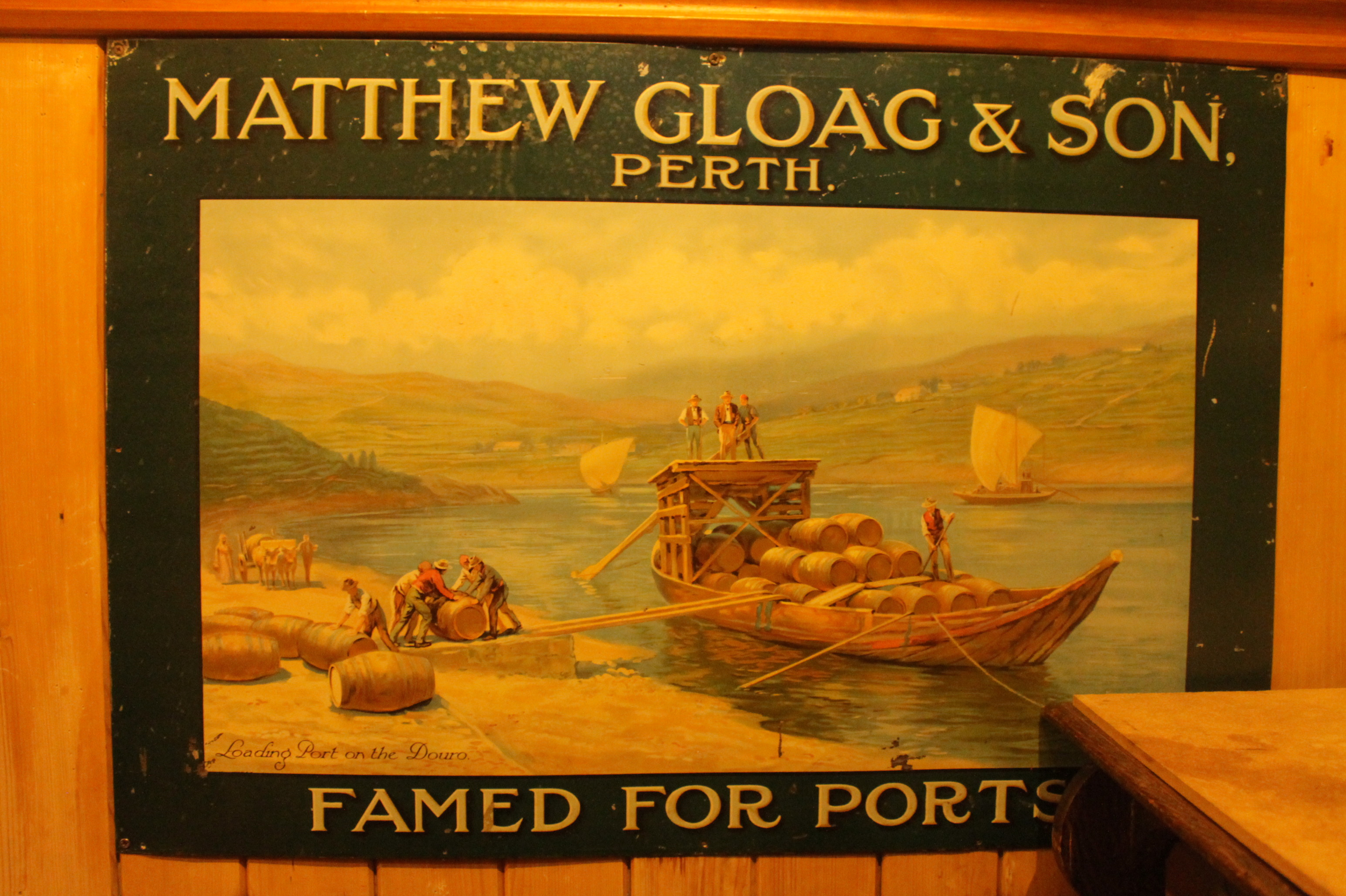
Advertising promoting Matthew Gloag & Son promoting import of port from Douro, c. 1850, Red Lion Public House, Culross

Matthew Gloag was a grocer and wine merchant at 22 Atholl Street, Perth, Scotland. He originally specialised on imported wines and ports from France, Spain and Portugal. When Queen Victoria visited Perth in 1842, he was invited to supply the wines for the royal banquet.

In 1860, his son, William Gloag, took over the company. Following the Great French Wine Blight the company began to look at creating its own blended whiskies around 1875. In 1896, William's nephew, Matthew Gloag (1850-1912), took over the family business. He created a new blended brand called The Grouse in 1896. at this time the company was still operating from the grandfather's premises but had expanded to occupy adjacent shops, jointly covering 20 to 26 Atholl Street.

In 1905 the limited company of Matthew Gloag & son was formed and the Grouse was renamed The Famous Grouse in the same year. Matthew Gloag's daughter Phillippa first designed the label's grouse icon. Only at this point did the company move to new purpose-built premises on Kinnoull Street.

In 1970, Matthew Gloag & Son, owned by the Gloag family, was sold to Highland Distillers, after the death of the chairman, Matthew Frederick Gloag. The marketing and distributive power of the company saw Famous Grouse become the highest selling Scotch in Scotland by 1980 and the second highest selling in the United Kingdom.

From the 1980s the brand began to be exported overseas, where it now sells over 2 million cases annually. In 1984, The Famous Grouse was awarded a Royal Warrant.

In September 2024, Edrington reached an agreement to sell The Famous Grouse to William Grant & Sons, subject to customary regulatory approvals. Following an inquiry by the UK Competition and Markets Authority, the sale was approved in March 2025.

== Characteristics ==
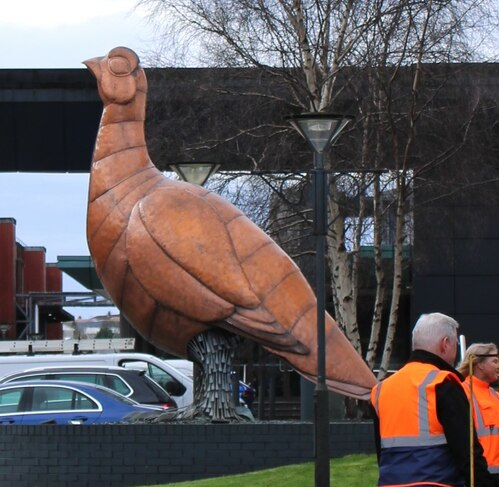
Famous Grouse distillery statue

The standard blend is 40% ABV.

The blend goes through a marrying process for up to six months at 46% ABV. It is mandated by The Scotch Whisky Association (SWA) that, in order to call a whisky "Blended Scotch", the youngest alcoholic component in the drink needs to be matured for at least three years. This implies that all single malt and single grain whiskies used to create any "Blended Scotch" must have been matured as prescribed for at least three years. If shown, the manufacturers must state the age of the youngest constituent malt of their whisky -- however an age statement is not legally mandatory for any scotch whisky, blended or otherwise. Blenders optimize a standard taste for their products by blending casks of varying ages among batches. Where there is no age statement the blenders need not worry the impact a relatively young cask's whisky might have on said statement. Ageing is done in oak casks.

== Variants ==
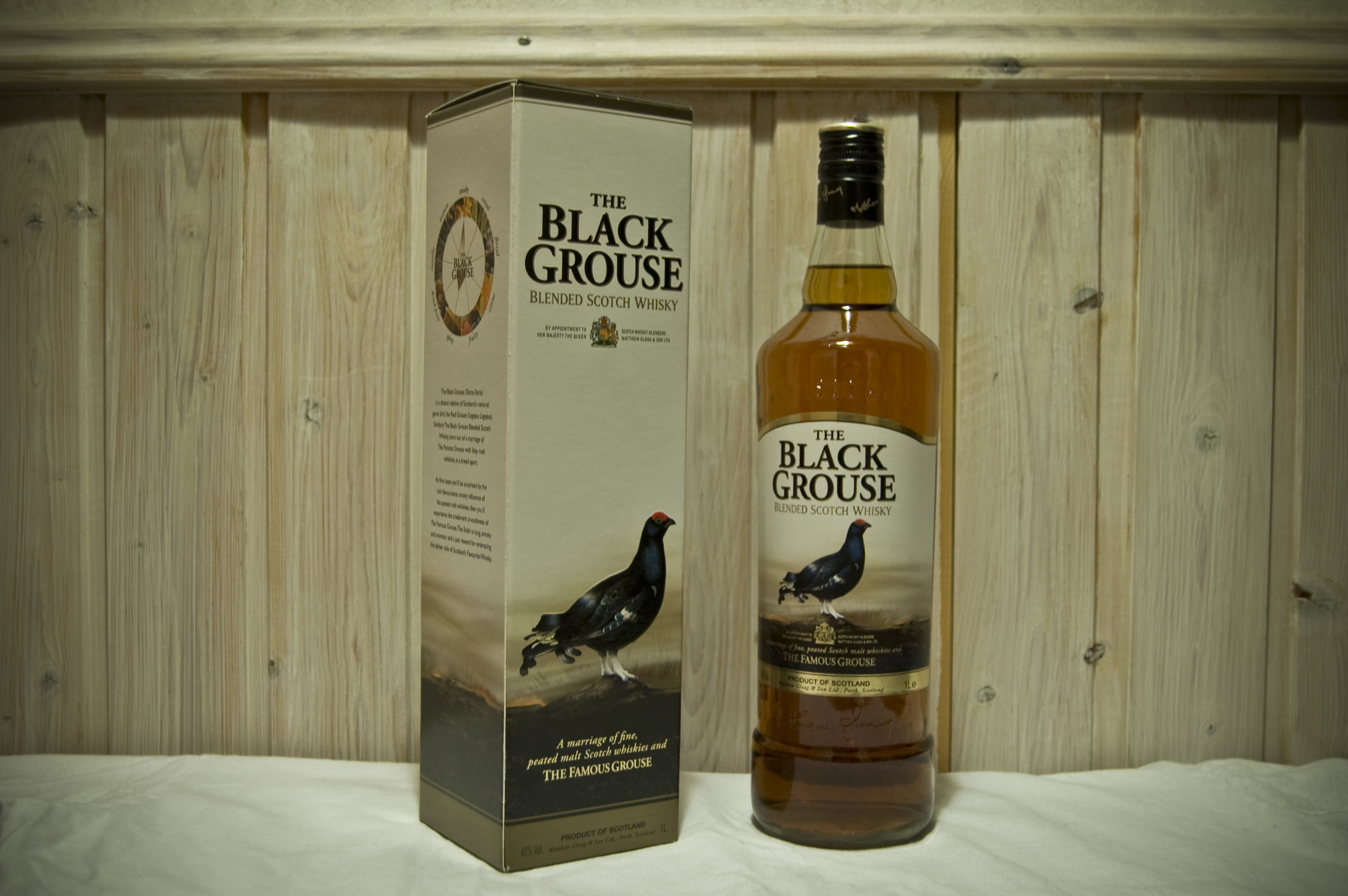
A bottle of Black Grouse

In 2007 a peated special version of The Famous Grouse called The Black Grouse developed for the Swedish market was released. The packaging displays a black grouse in place of the usual red grouse. In 2015 it was rebranded to The Famous Grouse Smoky Black.

In 2008, a special version, meant for chilling, was released called The Snow Grouse. While no official global announcement was made, The Snow Grouse was quietly discontinued in most markets around 2017–2019.

In 2011, The Naked Grouse was launched as its premium product. Initially as a high-end blended whisky, in 2017 it was turned into blended malt whisky. In 2021 it was rebranded to Naked Malt.

In 2013, The Famous Grouse released its oldest and most exclusive edition to date, a 40-year-old blended Scotch whisky. Only 276 were made and it was launched exclusively into Schipol Airport in August 2013, before being rolled out to global travel retail in October 2013.

In 2018, The Famous Grouse released two expressions, called the Cask Series, The Famous Grouse Bourbon Cask and The Famous Grouse Ruby Cask.

In 2022, The Famous Grouse Sherry Cask Finish and The Famous One were released.

== United States distribution ==
Suntory Global Spirits distribute The Famous Grouse in the U.S. market.

== Promotions and sponsorships ==
The Famous Grouse has focussed its television advertising around the Christmas period since 1996.

The Famous Grouse was the primary sponsor of the Perth-based football team St Johnstone between 1986 and 1989 and again between 1991 and 1998. It also sponsored the Scotland national rugby union team from 1990 until 2007, and was 'The Official Spirit of Scottish Rugby' from 2013 for three years.

In May 2014, The Famous Grouse was named the official whisky of the 2014 Commonwealth Games in Glasgow.

== Bibliography ==
- Buxton, Ian (2012). The Famous Grouse A Whisky Companion: Heritage, History, Recipes and Drinks. London: Ebury Press. ISBN 9780091944742.
