= Parkmore distillery =

Whisky distillery in Moray, Scotland

Coordinates: 57°27′17″N 3°07′09″W

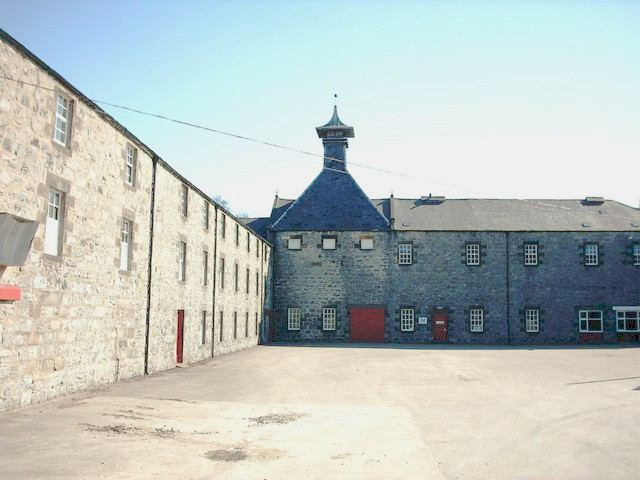

Region: Speyside
- Location: Dufftown, Scotland
- Owner: Edrington
- Founded: 1894
- Status: Converted into a whisky warehouse facility

Parkmore distillery is an inactive Speyside single malt Scotch whisky distillery in Dufftown, Moray, Scotland.

== History ==
Parkmore was founded in 1894 by the Parkmore Distillery Co., but ownership was transferred to James Watson and Co. Ltd. in 1900.

This company was then acquired by John Dewar & Sons Ltd. in 1923. In 1925, ownership was transferred again to Distillers Company Ltd. DCL transferred it to Scottish Malt Distilleries Ltd. in 1930, and stopped production in 1931.

Parkmore was finally closed in 1988. in the same year Parkmore distilery was sold to Highland Distillers and the buildings were converted into a whisky warehouse facility.

In 1999 Edrington acquired Highland Distillers, the Parkmore owner, through a partnership with William Grant & Sons taking a minority interest (the 1887 Company).
