= Ethel Robertson =

Scottish businesswoman and whisky brand investor (1902 – 1985)

Ethel "Babs" Robertson
- fair use image
- Born: Ethel Greig Robertson; 5 May 1902; Prestwick, Scotland
- Died: 4 December 1985 (aged 83); Haddington, Scotland
- Occupation: businessperson
- Known for: creating a controlling interest in a whisky company

(Babs) Ethel Greig Robertson (5 May 1902 – 4 December 1985) was a Scottish businesswoman and whisky brand investor. The companies that she and her sister controlled created the largest independent grant-making charitable trust in Scotland.

== Life ==
Robertson was born in 1902 in Prestwick. Her father was James Robertson and her mother, Agnes Ethel (born Greig), died a few days after she was born. She had two sisters, Agnes and Elpeth, and until the 1918 flu pandemic she had a brother who was the heir apparent to the family whisky business. She and her siblings had no contact with her mother's family when she was a child. Their uncle, Robert Coventry Greig, did not know that they existed until her brother contacted him. She was known as "Babs" from when she was a child.

Robertson's grandfather, William Alexander Robertson, who had co-founded the whisky business in 1857 died before she was born. Her grandmother Agnes Heatley Robertson was one of the first Scottish women to attend university (in her middle age). Ethel's father died in 1944 leaving his part of the business, Robertson and Baxter, to his daughters. Ethel became the lead partner in their part of the business - with Agnes and Elpeth's agreement. In 1946 Ethel cleverly maneuvered control of the business to her and her sisters as they struggle to avoid a takeover bid by Samuel Bronfman of Seagrams. The Robertson's company owned the valuable whisky brand Cutty Sark.

== Death and legacy ==
In 1959 the sisters increased their control of the company when they bought more shares from Highland Distilleries. The sisters lived together at the Edrington estate in Berwickshire. They made anonymous donations to universities and other good causes. They created Edrington to own their shares in order that they could keep control even after one of them died, as death duties would need to be paid. They also established The Robertson Trust, a registered charity under Scottish law, which owns all voting shares in Edrington. The Robertson Trust is now Scotland's largest independent grant-making charitable trust, and is funded by the dividend income of its shares in Edrington. Ethel Robertson died in Haddington in 1985.
