= Edrington (spirits company) =

Privately owned international spirits company based in Glasgow, Scotland

The Edrington Group Limited
- Type: Private limited company
- Industry: Drink industry
- Founded: April 25, 1961; 65 years ago
- Founder: The Robertson sisters (Elspeth, Agnes and Ethel "Babs")
- Headquarters: Glasgow, Scotland, UK
- Area served: Worldwide
- Products: Alcoholic beverages; Spirits
- Number of employees: 3,000
- Website: edrington.com

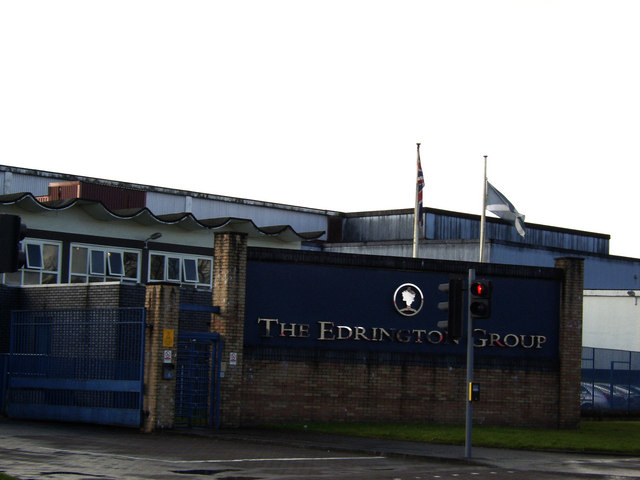
Distiller entrance in Drumchapel

The Edrington Group Limited, trading as Edrington, is a privately owned international spirits company based in Glasgow, Scotland. It produces single malts such as The Macallan, Highland Park, and The Glenrothes. The spirits portfolio also includes Wyoming Whiskey, and Brugal, a leading golden rum in the Caribbean. It also has a joint venture with Valdespino, No. 3 London Dry Gin.

Based in Glasgow, it employs approximately 3,000 people in its wholly owned and joint venture businesses around the world. Approximately 1,000 employees are based in Scotland.

== History ==
1861: founding of Robertson & Baxter

William A. Robertson began in business in Glasgow in 1850, forming Robertson & Baxter in 1861. In 1885 the company took a share holding in the North British Distillery Company. In 1887 the company became part of a group that founded Highland Distillers, with William Robertson as its first chairman. When William Robertson died in 1893, his oldest son, James, became chairman.

1961: creation of Edrington and The Robertson Trust

The Robertson sisters (Elspeth, Agnes and Ethel) inherited the Scotch whisky interests founded and developed by their grandfather and father. Keen to ensure the independence of the company, the welfare of its employees and to continue their tradition of supporting good causes in Scotland, in 1961 the sisters created The Edrington Group (named after their home in the Scottish Borders) to hold their business interests. At the same time, they also established The Robertson Trust, a registered charity under Scottish law, which owns all voting shares in Edrington. The Robertson Trust is now Scotland's largest independent grant making charitable trust, and is funded by the dividend income of its shares in Edrington. By 2025, the Trust had donated more than £396 million to charities in Scotland since its inception and given financial support to young people from deprived backgrounds who are attending higher education.

In 1999 Edrington acquired Highland Distillers through a partnership with William Grant & Sons taking a minority interest (the 1887 Company).

21st century

In the New Year Honours 2008, former chairman, John James Griffin Good, was made a Knight Bachelor "for services to Scotland".

In February 2008 the company bought a majority shareholding in Brugal of the Dominican Republic, the leading golden rum in the Caribbean.

In April 2010 Edrington acquired Cutty Sark blended Scotch whisky brand from long-standing trading partner Berry Bros. & Rudd.

In 2014 Edrington moved its Asia headquarters from Hong Kong to Singapore and created a new regional hub for Asia – Edrington Asia Pacific.

In April 2014, Edrington ended its relationship with Rémy Cointreau in the United States, and created its own distribution company – Edrington Americas.

In 2015, Edrington Global Travel Retail was created. It is based in the company's Asia Pacific Headquarters in Singapore.

In 2016 Edrington acquired a minority stake in Tequila Partida. It sold its stake to Lucas Bols in 2021.

In 2018 Edrington Americas took a minority stake in Wyoming Whiskey, an American whiskey.

In 2018 Edrington sold Cutty Sark to La Martiniquaise, a privately owned spirits company based in France.

In March 2019 Edrington sold 95% of the Glenturret distillery to the Swiss Lalique Group with private investors holding the remaining shares.

In April 2023 Edrington increased its shareholding of Wyoming Whisky to 80%, making it a majority stakeholder. In September 2023, Edrington acquired Vasyma, a Jerez-based cooperage business.

In September 2024 Edrington reached an agreement to sell The Famous Grouse and Naked Malt to William Grant & Sons, subject to customary regulatory approvals. Following an inquiry by the UK Competition and Markets Authority, the sale was approved in March 2025. The sale was completed on 1 July 2025.

== Whisky distilleries ==
Edrington operates three whisky distilleries in Scotland:

- Highland Park distillery
- The Glenrothes distillery
- The Macallan distillery

== Brands ==
Edrington beverage brands include:

- Scotch whisky:
  - Single malt Scotch whisky: Highland Park, The Glenrothes, The Macallan
- American Whiskey: Wyoming Whiskey (majority stake)
- Gin: No.3 London Dry Gin (minority stake)
- Rum: Brugal
- Sherries and aperitifs: Valdespino (joint venture)
