= Silvio Denz =

Swiss businessman

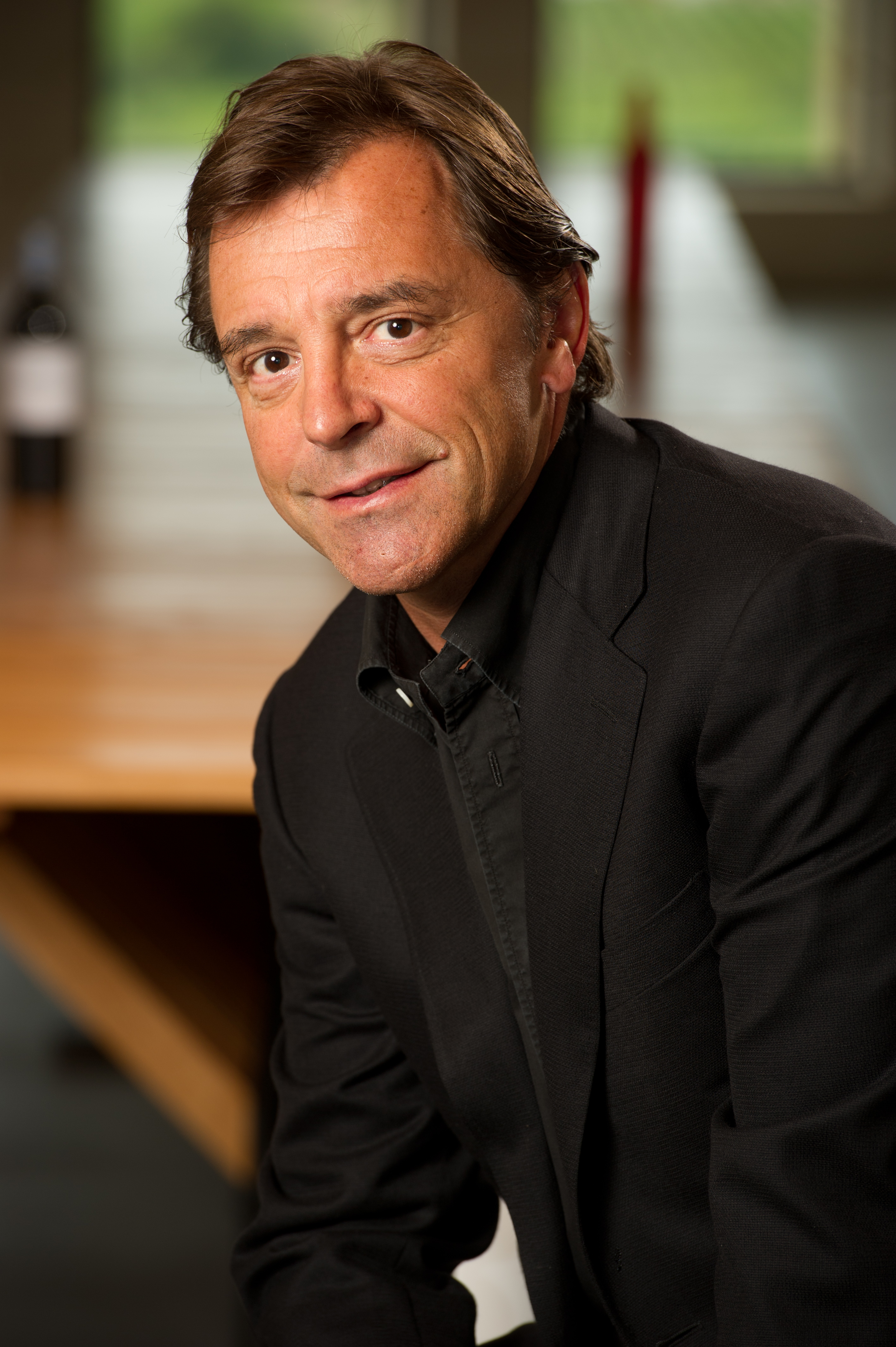
- Denz c. 2011
- Born: Silvio Werner Denz; 14 September 1956 (age 69); Basel, Switzerland
- Citizenship: Switzerland; Italy
- Occupations: Businessman, art and wine collector
- Known for: Lalique
- Partner: Tanja Wegmann (present)
- Children: 1

Silvio Werner Denz (born 14 September 1956) is a Swiss businessman and art and wine collector. In the past, he worked for various companies in Switzerland and the United States in the areas of finance, retail and marketing. He is primarily known for his ventures in the hospitality and luxury industry. He acquired Lalique in 2008 and in 2022 Florhof, a historic property in the old town of Zürich, together with Peter Spuhler. This will reopen as Villa Florhof, a Lalique hotel. The Swiss business magazine Bilanz ranks him among the 300 wealthiest Swiss citizens and the 100 most important figures of the Swiss economy.

== Early life ==
Denz was born 14 September 1956 in Basel, Switzerland, to Werner Denz (1920–1997) and Doris Denz (née Steiger). He has one brother and a sister. His father and uncle owned Alrodo Ltd., a perfume distribution company sold to French perfumery company Marionnaud in 2000. Denz completed a commercial apprenticeship. He has one son, Claudio Denz.

== Career ==
=== Perfume, cosmetics and fine spirits ===
In 1980 Denz took over the management of Zurich-based Alrodo AG, owned by his father and uncle. Initially, with eight employees, the company purchased perfumes and cosmetics for imported perfumery retailers. After acquiring all the equity in Alrodo in 1984, the company grew to be Switzerland's largest perfumery chain, with 120 branches. Between 1980 and 2000, the number of employees rose from 8 to 800. In 2000 Denz sold Alrodo to the French perfumery chain Marionnaud. In the same year he founded Lalique Group (formerly known as Art & Fragrance), specializing in the creation, production and marketing of perfume and cosmetic brands such as Perfumes Alain Delon, Parfums Grès, Lalique Parfums, Jaguar Fragrances, Bentley Fragrances, Superdry fragrances, Mikimoto fragrances and perfumes for Brioni. On 2007 the suncare brand Ultrasun was added to the portfolio. On 28 March 2019, Lalique Group completed the acquisition of 50% of Glenturret distillery, one of Scotland's oldest working single malt whisky distilleries, further expanding its portfolio in the luxury goods market. In 2021 the Glenturret Lalique restaurant opened its doors at the distillery and was awarded two Michelin stars in 2024. In July 2022, Denz and entrepreneur Peter Spuhler acquired the Hotel Florhof in Zurich. After carefully renovating the Lalique style, this historical building will reopen its doors as ‘Villa Florhof’ in 2025. 2023 Lalique Group acquired the Zurich silk label Fabric Frontline, which will relaunch in spring 2025. After a successful closing of the public tender offer made by Denz, the shares of Lalique Group AG have been delisted from SIX Swiss Exchange in September 2024.

=== Luxury ===
Denz accumulated the world's largest private collection of vintage perfume bottles designed by René Lalique, comprising over 650 original pieces. In 2008 the company acquired the French crystal warehouse Lalique S.A. After being restructured, the group became profitable again, with branding focused on art, decorative items, interior design, jewelry, perfume and hospitality. Co-branding projects were developed between Lalique and other luxury brands (including Bentley, The Macallan and Steinway & Sons). Collaborations were also signed with artists such as Zaha Hadid, Jean-Michel Jarre, Damien Hirst, and Elton John, resulting in collections for the company. In 2011, the Lalique museum in Wingen-sur-Moder (Alsace) opened to display more than 650 pieces designed by René Lalique and his successors, including jewelry, crystal and decorative glass. Denz loaned 230 pieces from his collection, mostly perfume bottles. Denz also converted René Lalique's villa in Wingen-sur-Moder into a luxury hotel and restaurant, which opened in September 2015 and holds two Michelin stars. Chef Paul Stradner presides over the restaurant.

=== Wine ===
In 1994 Denz, Franz Wermuth and five other partners, founded Les Grand Vins Wermuth S.A., now split into Denz Weine (distribution) and Wermuth Auktionen AG (auctions) in Zurich. In 1998, acting with the same partners, he bought the Clos d'Agon estate on the Costa Brava, which is overseen by the oenologist Peter Sisseck (Dominio Pingus). In 2020, Denz sold his stake in Clos d'Agon.

In 2005, on the recommendation of his friend Count Stephan von Neipperg (Château Canon-la-Gaffelière and La Mondotte), Denz bought the Château Faugères estate, six kilometers east of Saint Emilion. Faugères, which has 30 employees, comprises three vineyards: Château Faugères, Château Péby Faugères, both lying in the Saint-Emilion appellation, and Château Cap-de-Faugères in Côtes de Castillion. In 2010, he and Peter Sisseck took over the vineyard of Château Rocheyron in Saint-Emilion. The estates in Bordeaux cover a total of 120 hectares.

The winery at Château Faugères was designed by the architect Mario Botta. He describes his creation as a "cathedral of wine". The wines are aged in oak barrels using modern technology coupled with traditional methods, such as gravity-filling. In 2012, Château Faugères and Château Péby Faugères were awarded the status of Grand Cru Classé of Saint-Emilion. According to the wine critic Robert Parker, Château Péby Faugères today ranks among the finest Bordeaux wines. In 2015, the influential Parker's Wine Buyer's Guide rated Château Péby Faugères Vintage 2005 100/100. In February 2014, Denz acquired Château Lafaurie-Peyraguey, one of the few Premiers Grands Crus Classés of 1855 and one of the oldest vineyards in Sauternes. In 2018, the luxury hotel and gourmet restaurant were inaugurated at the Château Lafaurie-Peyraguey, today a member of the Relais & Châteaux collection and a 5-star hotel. Chef Jérôme Schilling and the restaurant Lalique were awarded the first Michelin star in 2019 and the second star in March 2022. In November 2023, Denz decided to sell his stakes to Lalique Group, which has completed an acquisition of a 75% stake in the renowned Château Lafaurie-Peyraguey vineyard.

In September 2017, Denz was inducted as a Saint-Emilion Jurat. The Jurade of Saint-Emilion currently consists of 127 Jurats and more than 3000 Saint-Emilion wine ambassadors worldwide. In October 2017, he was awarded a Special Jury Prize from Fond’Action Alsace for his active involvement in the Alsace region. In the same month, he received the Guillon d’Or award from a Vaudois wine brotherhood founded in 1954, commending his passion and performance in the world of wine.

The French wine magazine La Revue du Vin counted Denz among the 200 most important wine personalities of 2018 and the Swiss magazine Vinum named himamong the 25 most important wine personalities of 2022.

=== Real Estate ===
In 2003, Denz entered the real estate business in London. Working with local partners, he buys, renovates, and then resells traditional town houses in Mayfair, Knightsbridge and Kensington.

== Personal life ==
Denz has one son, born in 1988. He holds dual citizenship of Switzerland and Italy.

== Collector ==
=== Pictures ===
Denz collects works of art via his company Art & Trade.

=== Wine ===
Denz has been buying vintage wines for over 30 years, mainly from Bordeaux. His private cellar contains more than 35,000 bottles.

=== Crystal ===
His interest in perfume bottles dates from his time at Alrodo. Today, he is the owner of the world's largest private collection of bottles by the French glass artist René Lalique.

== Awards and memberships ==
Honorary Officer « Coteaux de Champagne » (October 7, 2022); Denz is "Commandeur de la Commanderie du Bontemps de Médoc, des Graves, de Sauternes et de Barsac" (17 May 2019); Member of the Board of Directors Lindt & Sprüngli (2018); Distinction "Les 200 personnalités du vin", La Revue du vin de France (2018), Member "Chaîne des Rôtisseurs", Alsace (2018); Saint-Emilion Jurat, The Jurade of Saint-Emilion 17 September (2017); Special Jury Prize, Fond’Action Alsace (2017); The Guillon d’Or award, Confrérie du Guillon (2017); Member "Keepers of the Quaich", Scotland(2015); Honorary member, Confrérie Saint-Etienne d'Alsace (2017); Member "Club Prosper Montagne" (2016)
