= Glenturret distillery =

Distillery in Perthshire, Scotland

Coordinates: 56°23′22″N 3°51′14″W

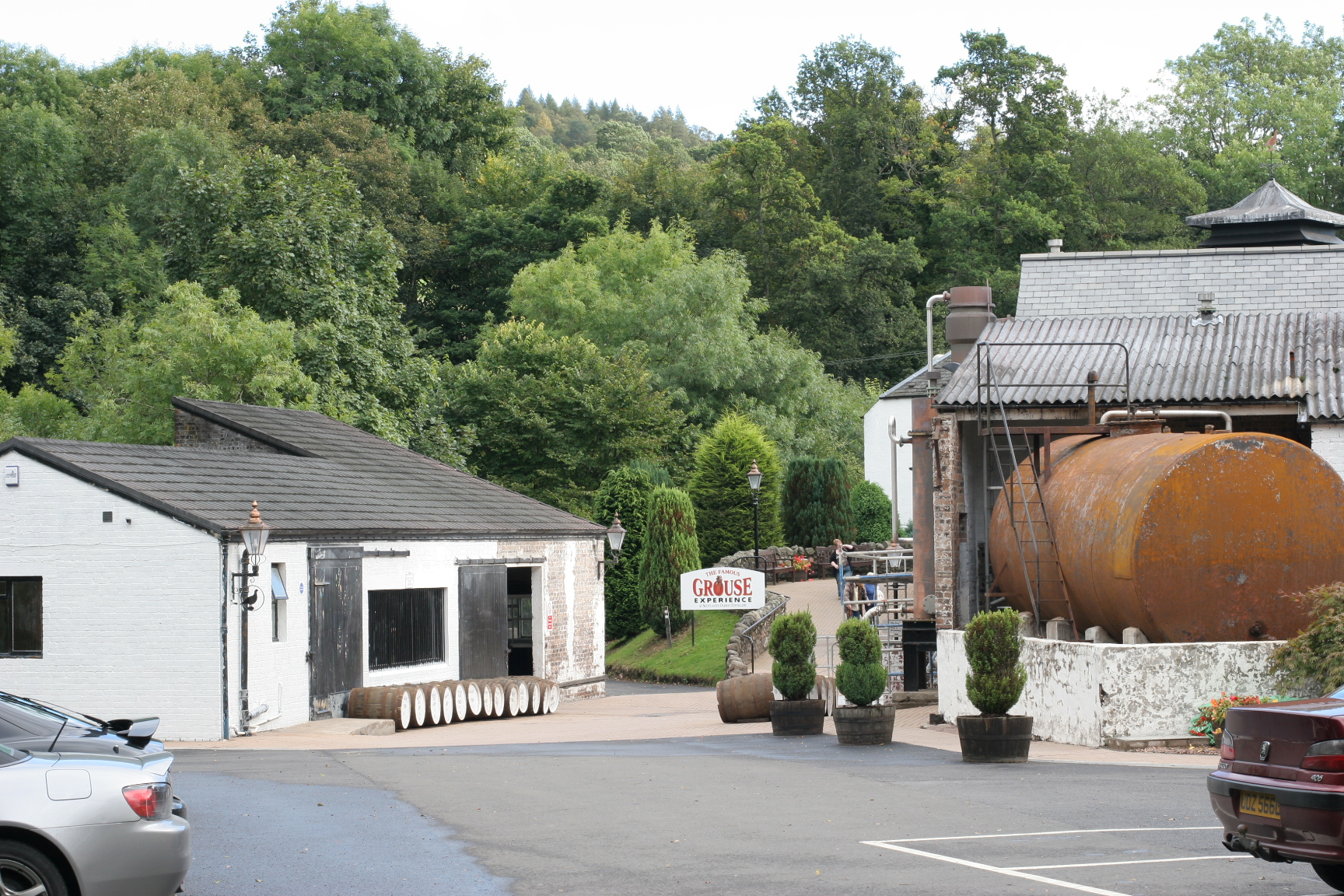
- Location: Perthshire
- Owner: Lalique Group SA
- Founded: 1763
- Status: Operational
- Water source: Loch Turret in Glenturret
- No. of stills: 1 wash still 1 spirit still
- Capacity: 340,000 litres/per annum

The Glenturret
- Type: Single malt
- Cask type(s): Oak,

Glenturret distillery is a Highland single malt Scotch whisky distillery located two miles (three kilometres) northwest of Crieff in Perthshire, Scotland on the banks of the Turret River.

The distillery is hidden in the glen and its secluded location may have contributed to its early history as the site of several illicit bothy stills. The high hills to either side of the distillery were thought to act as lookout points for the smugglers. When Alfred Barnard visited the distillery he described the glen as "a perfect paradise to artists, who come in great numbers to transfer some of its transcendent beauties to canvas". The distillery is located in the parish of Monzievaird and Strowan.

== History ==
The distillery was officially established in 1763, but had previously been under the control of illicit distillers, who sought to avoid paying taxes, since 1717. This early history has led to claims that Glenturret is the oldest distillery in Scotland, a title contested by other establishments such as Littlemill or Strathisla.

The distillery was originally known as “Hosh” and was originally owned by the Drummond family. "Hosh" comes from the Gaelic "cois", meaning foot. It was taken over by John McCallum in 1845, until 1875 when Thomas Stewart took it over and renamed it Glenturret in its centenary year.

The First World War saw the closure of the distillery, but following the war it reopened under the Mitchell Brothers until 1921, when the great depression and prohibition in America saw it closed again. The buildings during this period were kept as storage by the Murrays of Ochtertyre.

Glenturret did not reopen again to production until 1957 when it was revitalised by James Fairlie. Fairlie was a whisky enthusiast and his intention was to make a malt whisky created in traditional fashion and to preserve the craft of distilling.

The distillery was bought by Cointreau in 1981 and from there passed to Highland Distillers in 1990. Highland Distillers was taken over by The Edrington Group in 1999. It then became the home of “The Famous Grouse Experience”, which was nominated for an Interactive Entertainment Award at BAFTA in 2002.

The distillery was put on the market in end 2018 and acquired by the Lalique Group and one of its major shareholders.

In November 2024, announced that will remove peat from production starting 2025.

== Production and character ==
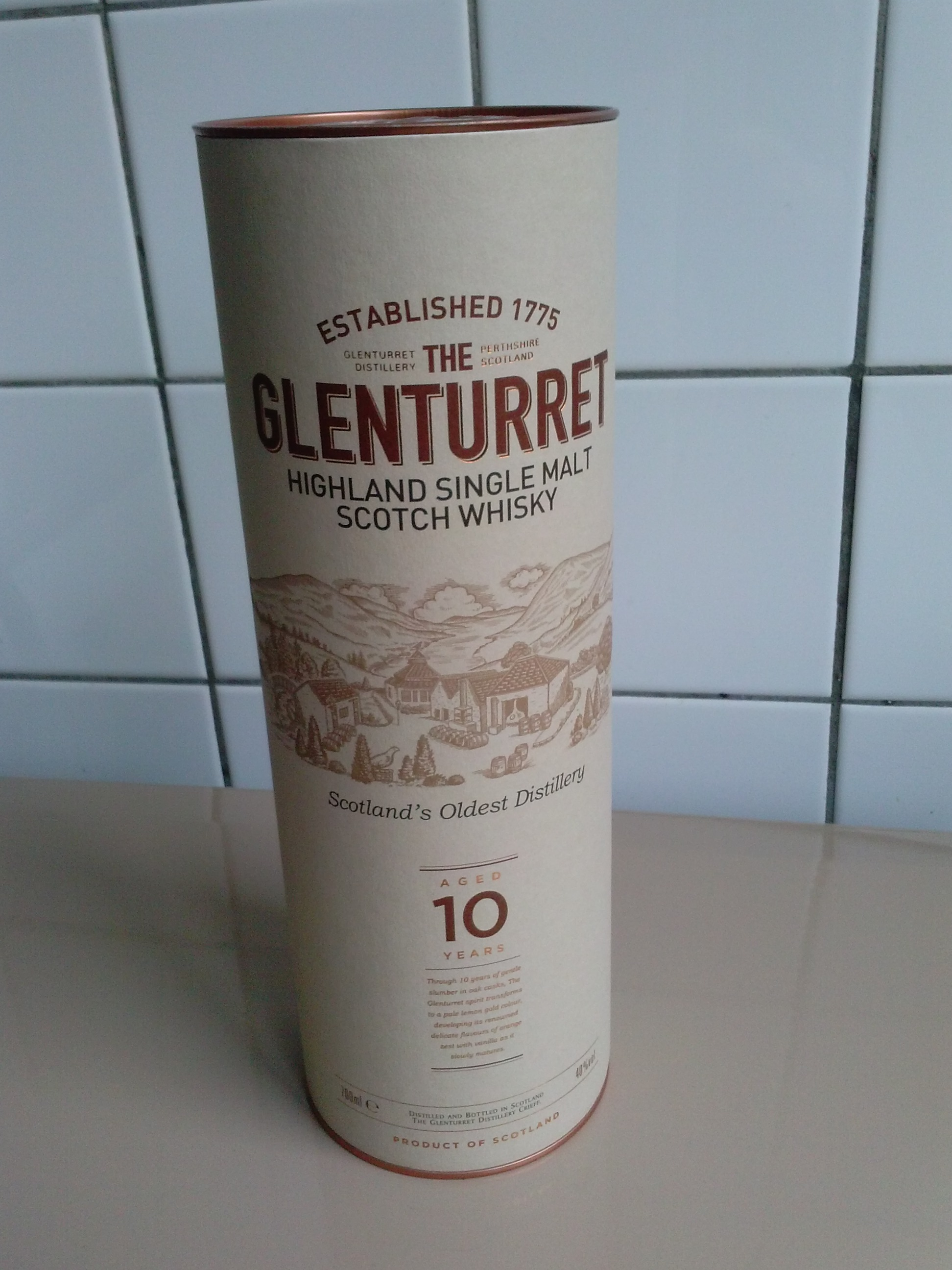
A bottle of Glenturret whisky. Above a 10-year-old, 700 mL, 40.0% Vol.

The water supply for the Glenturret comes via its own pipeline from Loch Turret which has its origin in Ben Chonzie. As the water used contributes much of the taste and character of the whisky, the purity and quality of the water is essential in the whisky making process. Ben Chonzie is part of the Grampian Mountain Range and is a granitic intrusion, with a diorite composition. This geology has resulted in the extreme softness of the water of Loch Turret making it a suitable source for the whisky.

Barley is soaked in water from the source for two to three days then spread over the floor of the malting house. The green malt is then dried in a kiln over peat smoke, before being milled into grist, which is then mixed with hot water in the mash tun at about 70 °C for an hour. This is drained off and the second water, which is hotter, is added and allowed to run straight through. The third water is even hotter and is used as the first water for the next batch. The sugary wort is collected, cooled and then fermented in large pine vessels called wash backs. Yeast is added and after 48 hours of fermentation the wash is made. The wash is then pre-heated in a wash-charger and from there goes to the wash still. This is a traditional pot still made of copper and is of a shape unchanged in the history of Scotch whisky making. The wash is heated in the pot still so the alcohol vapour rises up and cools and condenses in the low wines receiver. The low wines then passes through to the spirit still where it is distilled again. The spirit running through the pot and spirit stills is subject to Her Majesty's Customs and Excise Duty and so is kept under lock and key. It can be sampled and tested by the stillman via the spirit sample safe. The spirit from the spirit still is divided in three parts, but only the middle cut or “Heart of the Run” is suitable to be made into malt whisky. The other two parts are fed back into the low wines receiver to be re-distilled. The middle cut then goes to an oak spirit receiver and from there to the filling vats in the spirit store.

At this stage more water is added to reduce the concentration of alcohol from 75% to 64%. Each oak cask is handmade and therefore unique, so each must be weighed before and after filling to determine how much spirit is in each. Each cask is stencilled with the name, year, cask number and number of litres. The casks are then laid aside in the warehouse for a minimum of three years when it can be used for blending. But for the malt whisky range it is matured for 8, 10, 12, 15 or 21 years or longer for very special bottlings.

Philip Hills has described Glenturret with the words:- "Its nose has the floweriness which is characteristic of such [bourbon cask]; it opens up with water and yields scents of elderflower and liebfraumilch. It is entirely honest, not appearing to be anything it isn't, but what it is, is sufficient; an entirely pleasing and agreeable whisky."

== Whisky ==
=== Core Release ===
- Triple Wood
- 7 Years Old Peat Smoked
- 10 Years Old Peat Smoked
- 12 Years Old
- 15 Years Old

== Towser the mouser ==
Towser, a female long-haired tortoiseshell cat, the resident feline pest control expert at Glenturret from 1963 till 1987, was an officially recognised record breaker. Her record-breaking victim count was estimated as 28,899 mice, which were laid out on the Still House floor each morning to be inspected by the stillman. The auditors for the Guinness Book of Records observed Towser's prowess over a number of days, and her total kill count was estimated statistically. She was commemorated by a bronze statue at the visitor's centre at Glenturret and her story was featured on BBC Television's Blue Peter. Her paw prints also decorate the label on a bottle of Fairlie's light Highland Liqueur. Her immediate successors were Dylan and Brooke, who were chosen for their friendliness and photogenic looks rather than for their mousing skills. The distillery currently "employs" Glen, an orange tabby, and Turret, a gray tabby for mousing duties.

== Illicit distilling ==
Excise duty was introduced in Scotland in 1660. The taxation laws were very complex and it was unclear how much tax should be paid. Duties also continued to rise gradually and Robert Burns wrote the poem "Earnest Cry and Prayer" in 1785 about the problems these high duties caused. Burns himself was an exciseman between 1789 and 1796. He was reported to be "not a bustling active gauger" and was allegedly too impatient for the lengthy stake-outs required in his investigations. But the job paid very well and there were often sizeable rewards paid and the job had very good security.

In 1814 the act banning the use of stills of less than 500 imperial gallons (2,300 litres) was introduced. This limited whisky production to commercial concerns and from then on farmers had no way of raising enough money to pay their rents, as distilling allowed them to use their excess grain for whisky which could be sold at a profit greater than that of the grain itself. This drove many honest people to smuggling as a way to survive. Many widespread difficulties were caused by farmers moving off the land, that agriculture in the Highlands was in danger of dying out. The law was changed in 1816 to allow stills of more than 40 imperial gallons (180 L) to be legal to encourage small distillers. However this still meant that stills under 40 imp gal (180 L) were determined to be portable and hence illegal which eradicated a lot of domestic distilling.

Smuggling gangs set up stills in secret places. The stills themselves were small so that if the exciseman was spotted they could be removed and hidden. Smuggling chiefs were often men of high standing in the community. When one of their men was arrested the chief's name would be kept secret. This was partly due to the fact that the excise duties were seen as a tax by a foreign power, i.e. England, and so denying this revenue was their patriotic duty.

There are many tales of the deviousness of the whisky smuggler in outwitting the gaugers (an itinerant exciseman who measured containers and their content), and the excisemen. In one such story the gaugers confiscated a large cask of spirit and transported it to a nearby inn where they were staying. They took the cask to their room on the second floor for safe keeping. The smugglers came to the inn and employed the serving girl to locate where the cask sat on the floor above and, using an auger bore into the bottom of the cask, removed all the spirit so that there was none left for the gaugers to sample.

The only way to tackle the illegal distilling entirely was to decrease the duty so that it was no longer profitable and increase policing so that the military and gaugers were increased. Revenue cutters were employed up and down the coast and the numbers excisemen was increased as they were often outnumbered by smuggling gangs. Further tariff reforms and generous rewards for informers were introduced and these measures became known as "the burning and starving act".

Illicit distilling has died out from lack of profitability, but rumours still persist in remote places of homemade moonshine like "Melvaig Mist" and in Shropshire.

== See also ==
- List of distilleries in Scotland
- List of historic whisky distilleries
