= Château Lafaurie-Peyraguey =

Coordinates: 44°32′58″N 0°20′16″W

- Location: Graves, Bommes, France
- Coordinates: 443258 N, 02016 W
- Wine region: Bordeaux wine
- Parent company: Lalique Group (2023–present)
- Website: www.lafaurie-peyraguey.com/home/

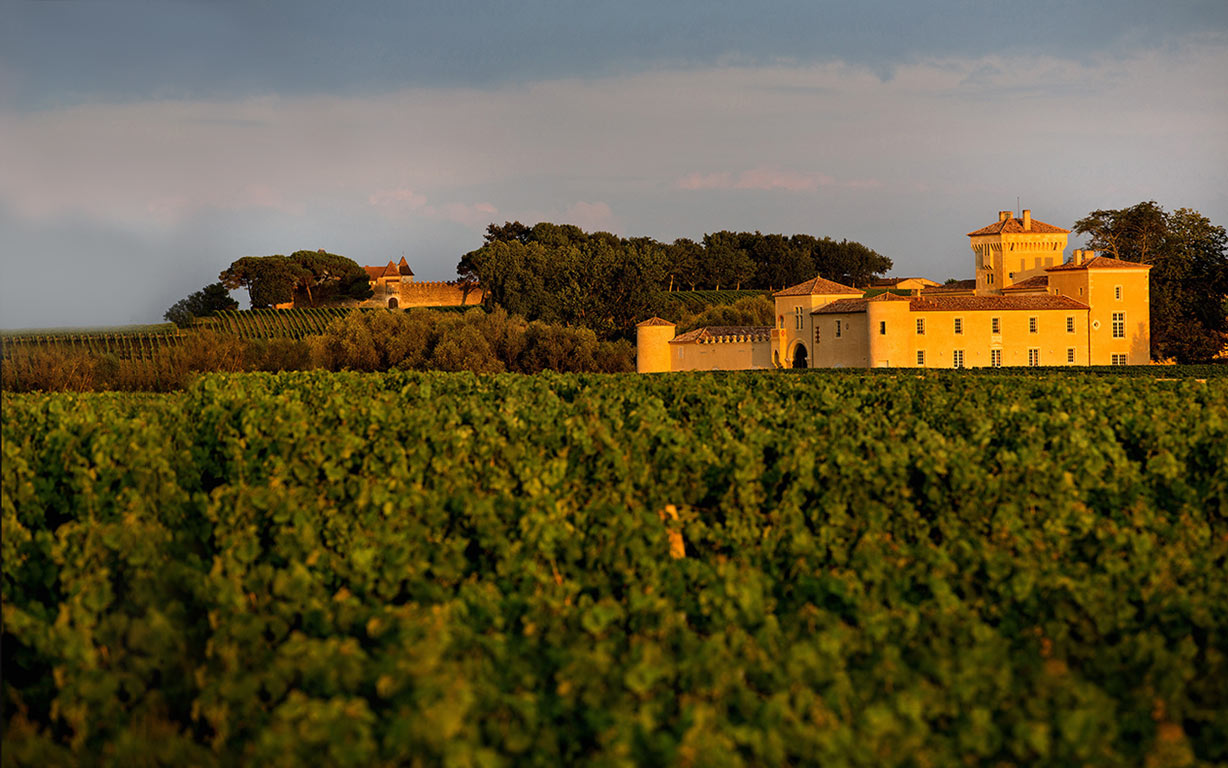
Château Lafaurie-Peyraguey with Château Yquem in the background

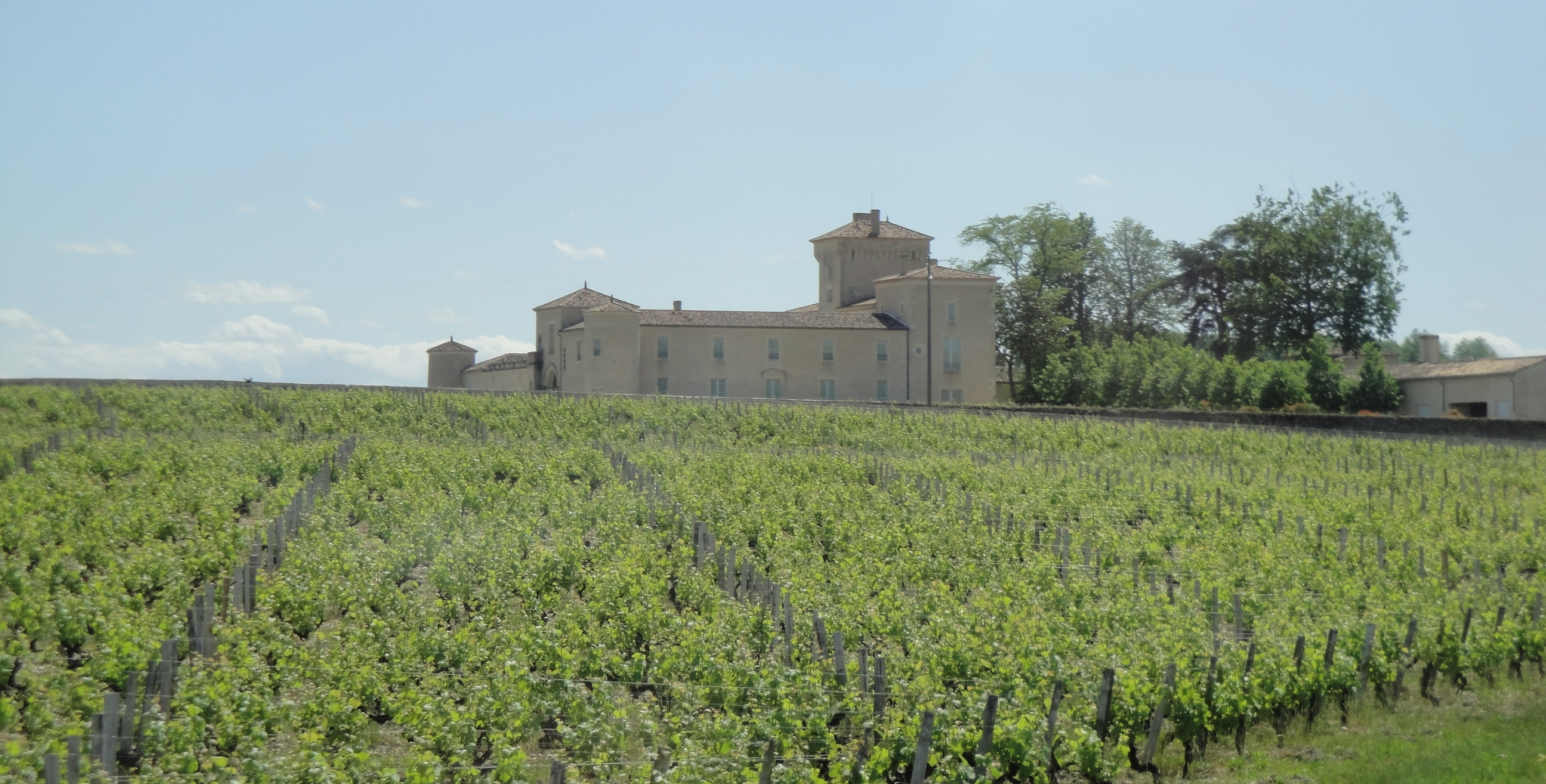
Château Lafaurie-Peyraguey and vineyards

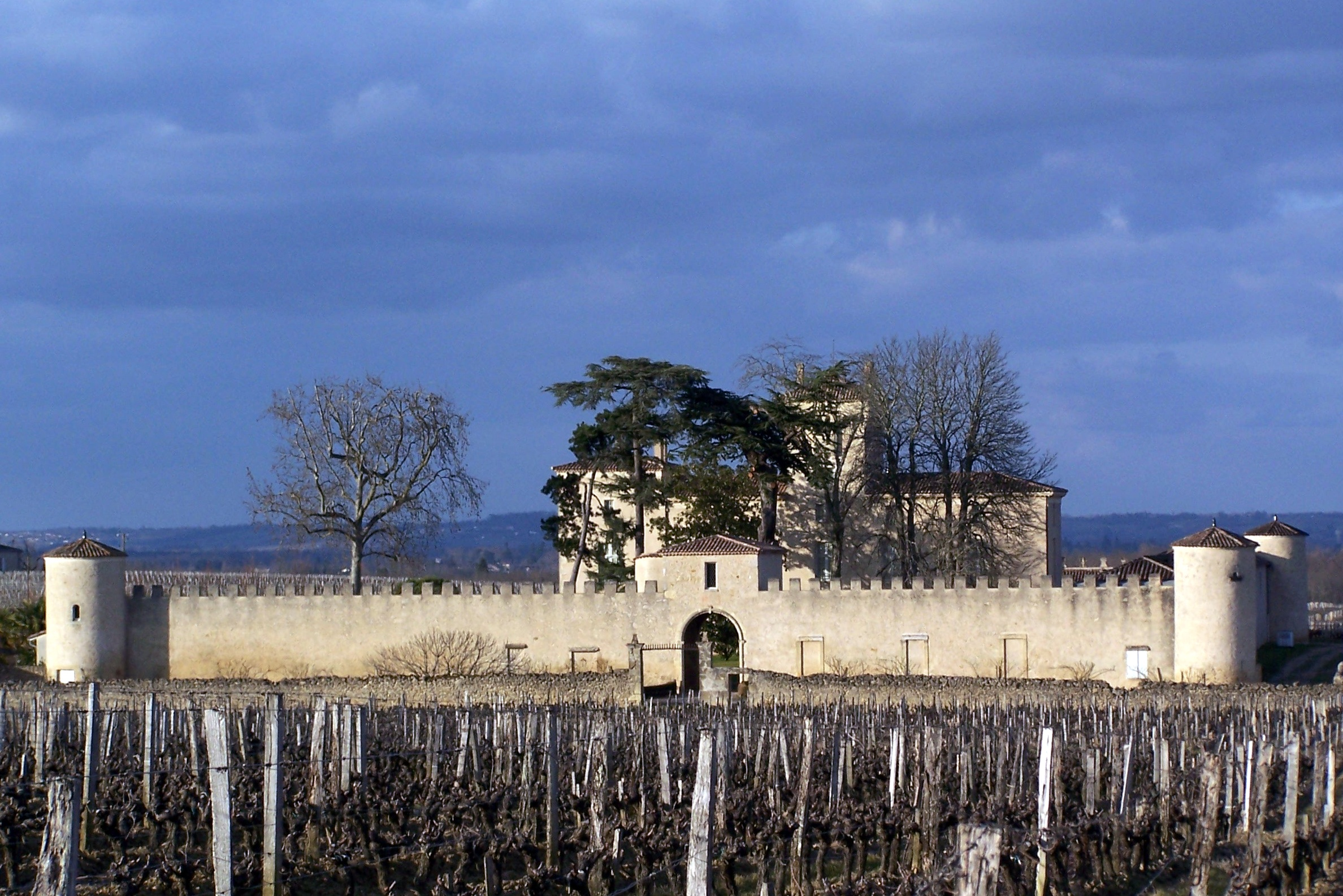
Walls of Château Lafaurie-Peyraguey

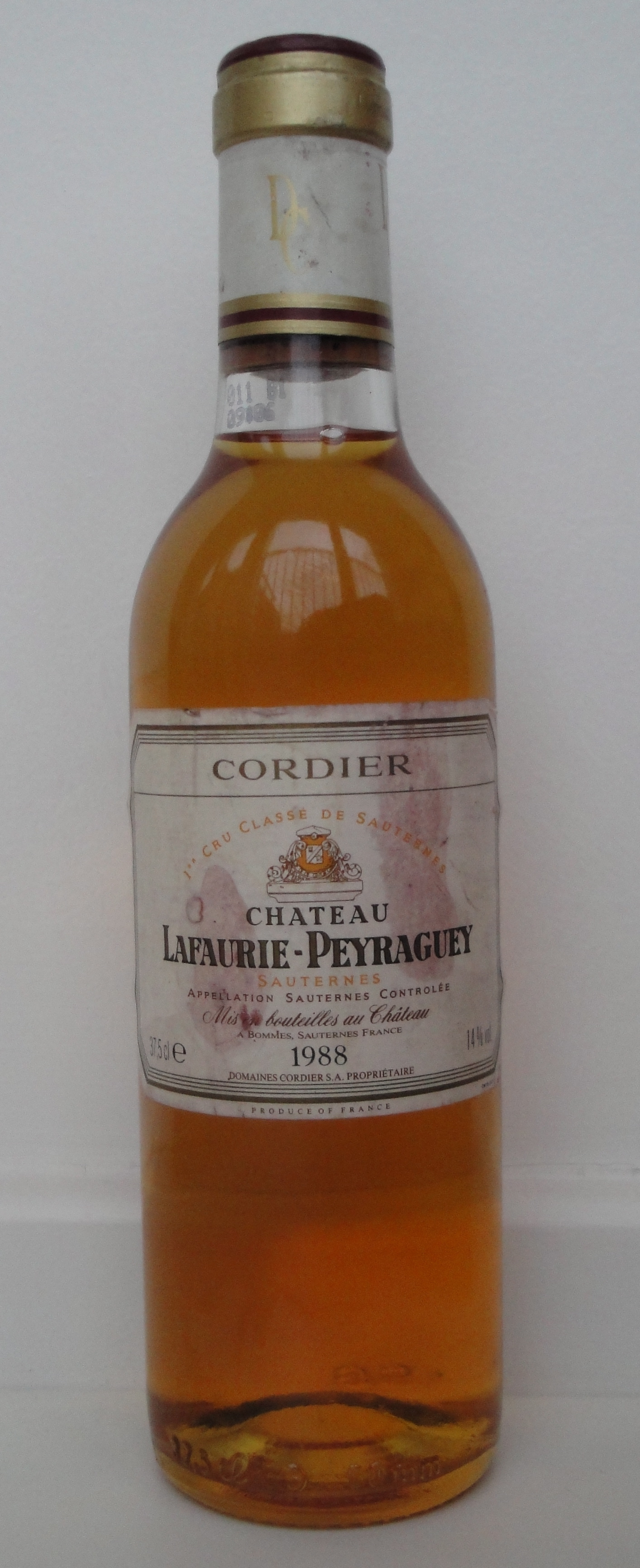
A half bottle of 1988 Château Lafaurie-Peyraguey.

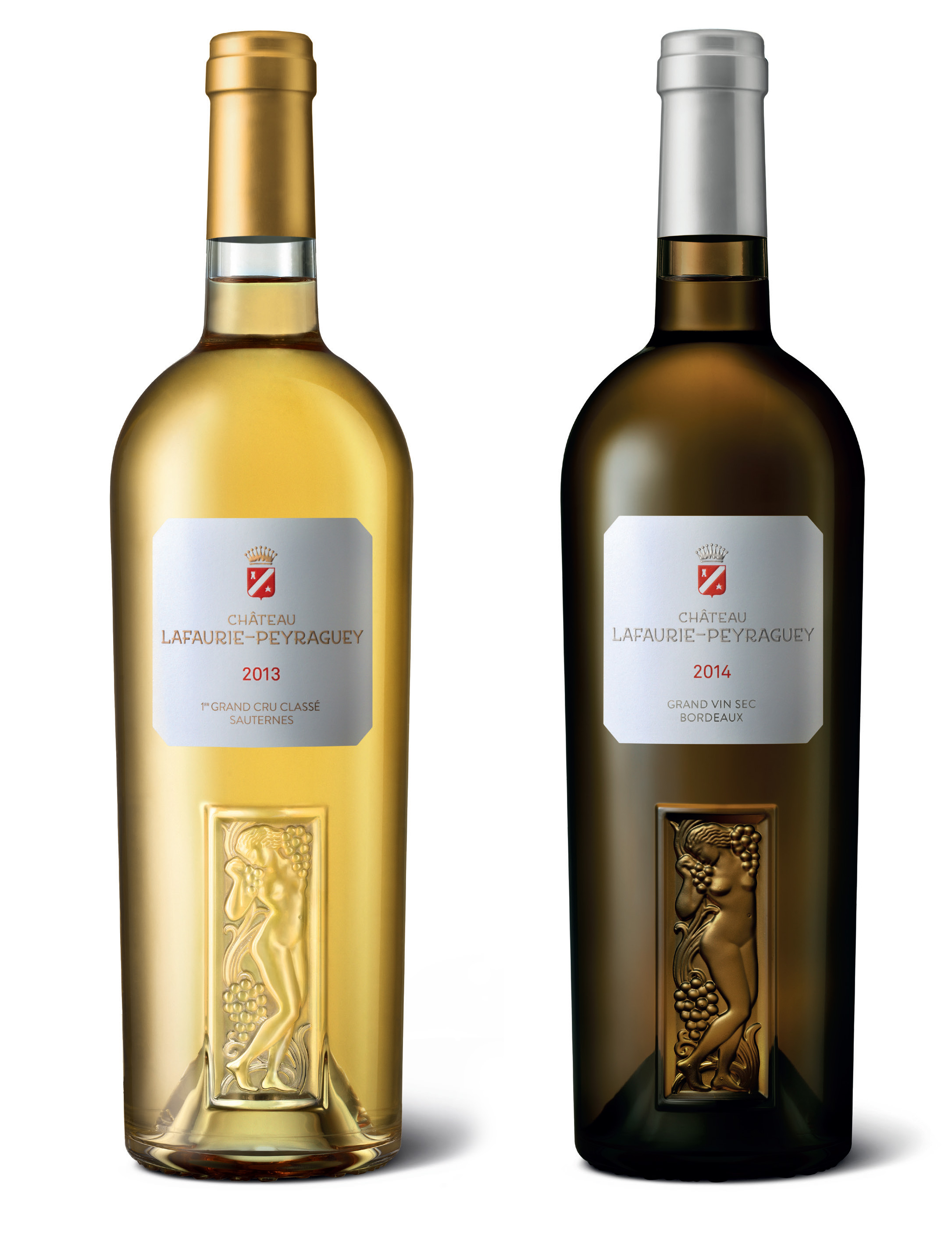
The two bottles of Lafaurie-Peyraguey and Lafaurie-Peyraguey Sec with an engraving of René Lalique “Femme et Raisin” from the year 1928 (Orient Express)

Château Lafaurie-Peyraguey is a Premier Cru Classé (French, “First Growth”) Sauternes wine from the Sauternes appellation.

The winery is located in the southern part of France's Bordeaux wine region in the district of Graves in the commune of Bommes, and its château is situated on a hill top facing Sauternes' highest classed vineyard, Château d'Yquem. It produces a second wine, La Chapelle de Lafaurie, and two dry white wines: Château Lafaurie-Peyraguey – Grand Vins blanc Sec and Le Lys de Lafaurie-Peyraguey.

On November 16, 2023, Lalique Group purchased a majority stake (75%) and began to control French wine.

== History ==
Built as a fortified keep in the 13th century, the structure then known as Château Pichard served as a military post until it was sold to the gentlemen Lafaurie and Mauros as a national asset following the French Revolution.

Faurie bought sole ownership and began wine production initially under the name Château Pichard-Faurie, and eventually as Lafaurie-Peyraguey, the reasons behind the altered name uncertain. The reputation and price of the wine came to merit third placement at the 1855 classification of Sauternes and Barsac directly behind Yquem and La Tour Blanche.

Following the death of Lafaurie, it was sold by his widow in 1865 to Comte Duchâtel, then owner of Château Lagrange, given to his wife, and after her death the estate saw numerous changes to its property lines. Bought by the Cordier family in 1917, the winery has since been rebuilt to constitute a modern estate.

== Production ==
The grape variety distribution is 93% of Sémillon, 6% of Sauvignon blanc and 1% of Muscadelle. The vineyard area extends 37 hectares (91 acres), with an average production of 6000-7000 cases per year.

== See also ==
- Château Raymond-Lafon
