= Château Clos Haut-Peyraguey =

Coordinates: 44°32′45″N 0°20′23″W

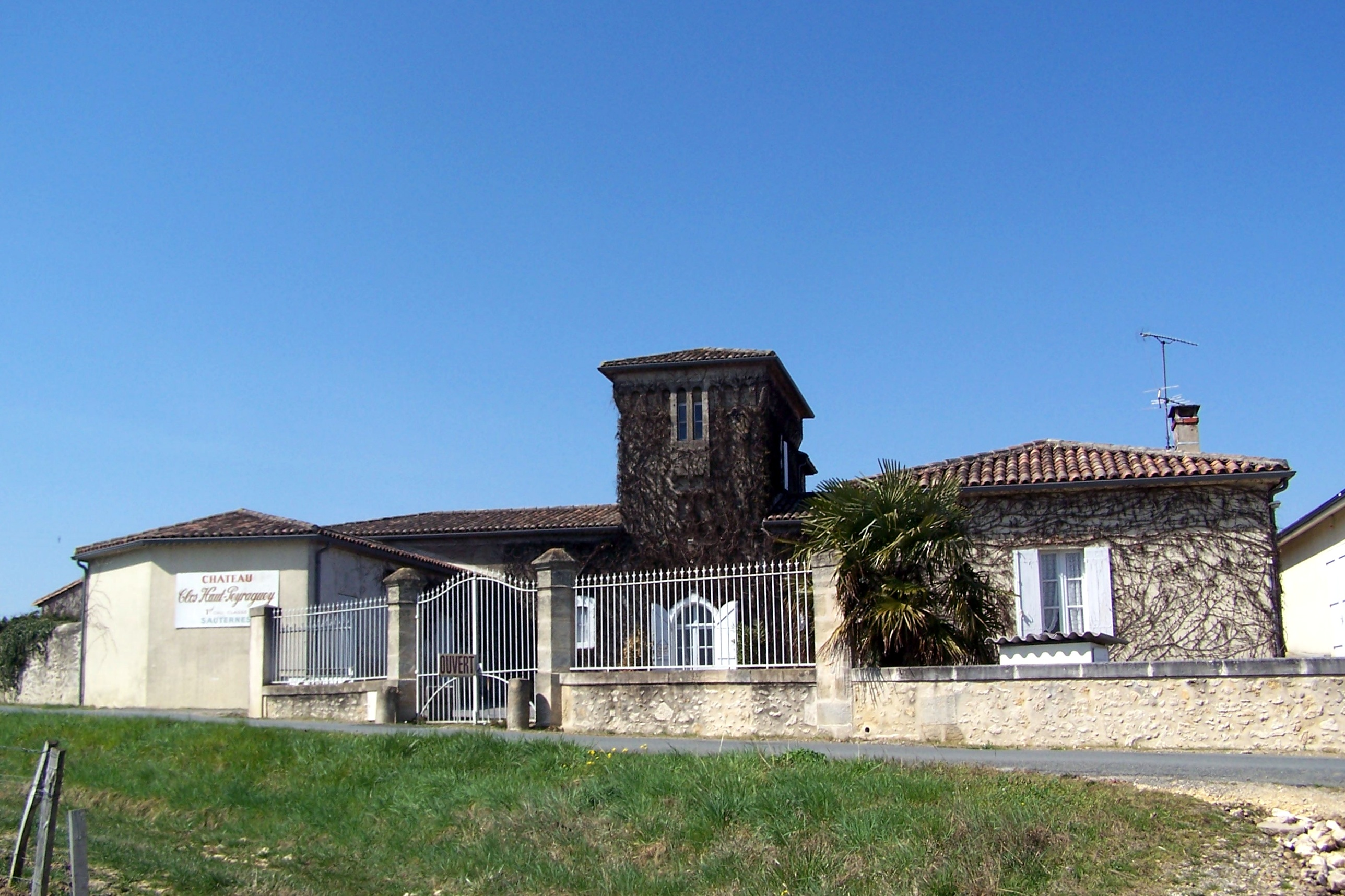
View of the buildings

Château Clos Haut-Peyraguey is a sweet white wine ranked as Premier Cru Classé (French, “First Growth”) in the original Bordeaux Wine Official Classification of 1855. Belonging to the Sauternes appellation in Gironde, in the region of Graves, the winery is located in the commune of Bommes. In October 2012 the winery was purchased by French wine tycoon Bernard Magrez.

== See also ==
- Château Raymond-Lafon
