= Château Raymond-Lafon =

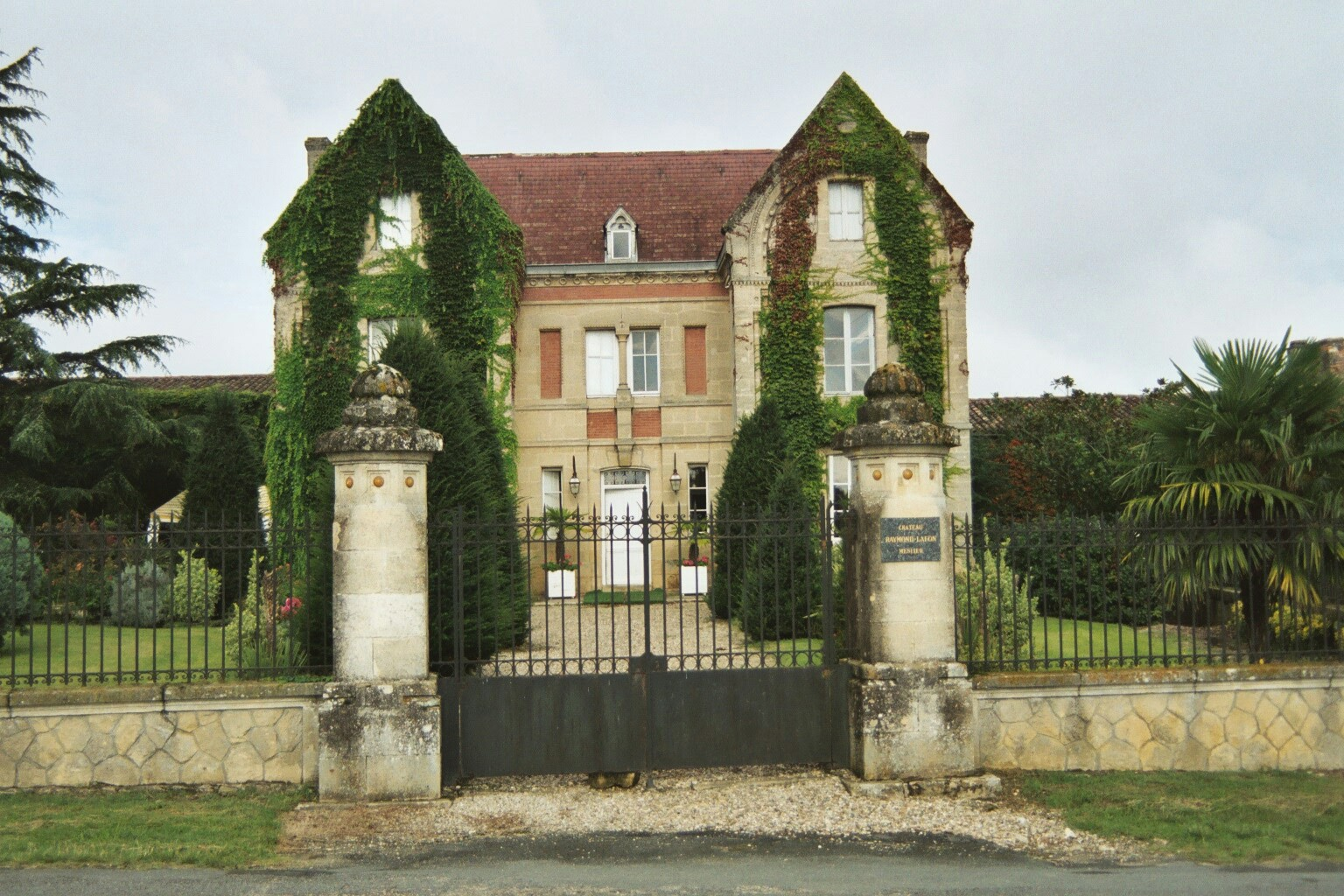
Château Raymond-Lafon

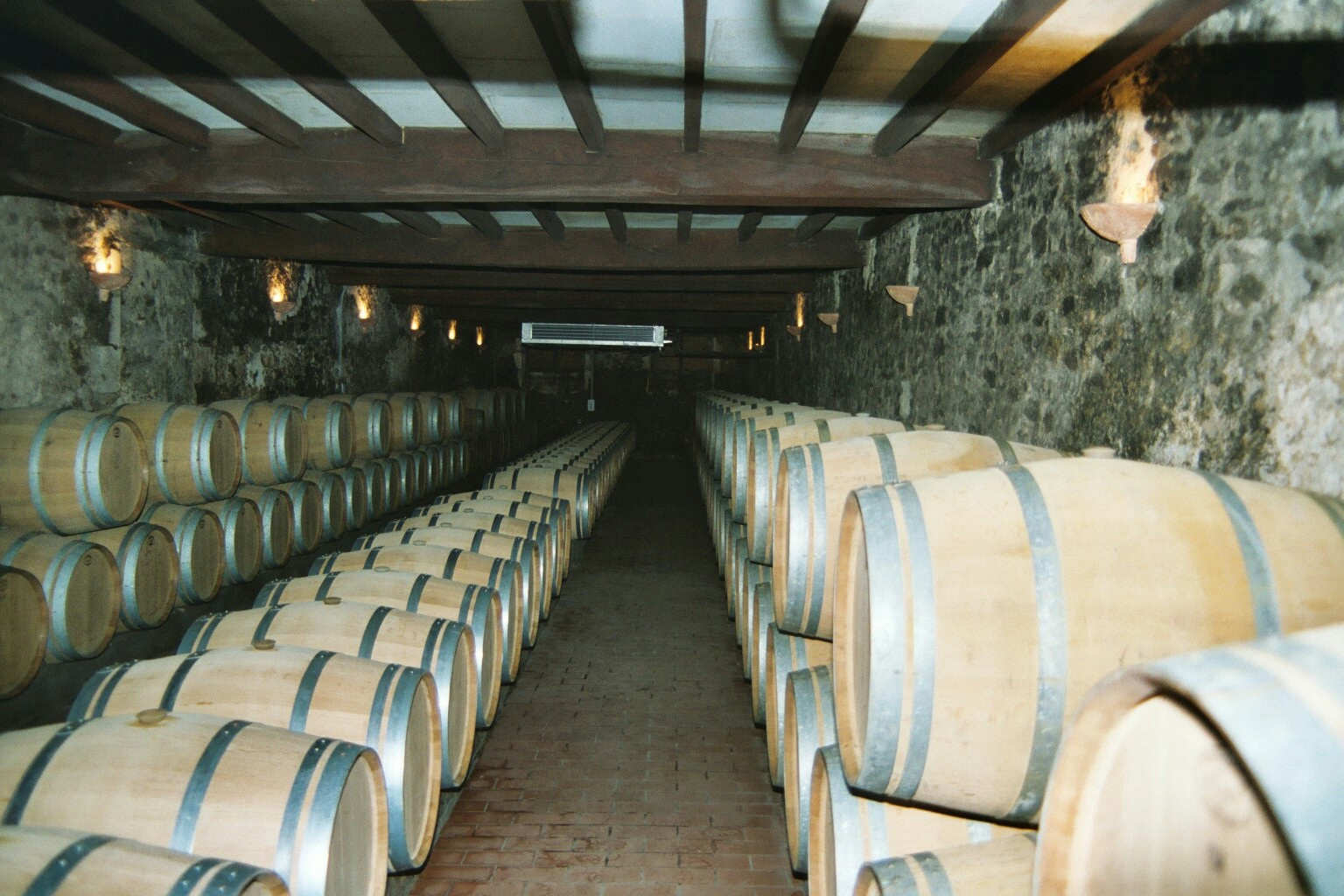
Barriques of Raymond-Lafon

Château Raymond-Lafon is an unclassified Sauternes wine producer from the Sauternes appellation. The estate's sweet wines are a result of the onset of "noble rot" (Botrytis cinerea).

Raymond-Lafon is located in the southern part of France’s Bordeaux wine region in the district of Graves, immediately north of Sauternes' most historically rated vineyard, Château d'Yquem, east of Château Lafaurie-Peyraguey and Château Clos Haut-Peyraguey, and south of Château Suduiraut.

== History ==
The 1850 edition of Cocks & Féret mentions the Lafon cousins, one of whom was Raymond Lafon, a mayor of Sauternes, who was later registered as a vineyard owner by 1868. During the period of the Bordeaux Wine Official Classification of 1855, the vineyards extended 25 hectares (62 acres) and were located in the middle of several classified growths, but the vines were only five years old at the time, deemed premature for classification. Raymond-Lafon is therefore unclassified, and to date not included at the annual UGC en primeur tastings.

After a succession of owners, the estate came to be in a state of disrepair until it was purchased in 1972 by Pierre Meslier, regisseur (technical director) of Château d’Yquem from 1963 to 1989. Meslier applied the techniques of Yquem and the resulting product became a success within few years, demand eventually exceeding available product, and vintages in the 1980s sold for prices beyond that of wines from highly rated châteaux such as Climens and Rieussec.

David Peppercorn describes Raymond-Lafon as up to cru classé standards, while Tom Stevenson directs critical commentary at the estate in The Sotheby's Wine Encyclopedia in 2005, contending that Raymond-Lafon was "performing at only deuxième cru level and consequently overrated and overpriced", and, "a nice Sauternes, but not worth three times the price of Rieussec or two-and-a-half times as much as Climens".

Conversely, the estate attracted attention in 2010 when the prices of the acclaimed 2009 vintage were released, and in contrast to other Sauternes estates who had continued the trend of raising prices from the previous year, Raymond-Lafon had lowered theirs by 12% from the 2008 price and 24% from the 2005 price.

Raymond-Lafon is presently owned by the Meslier family, run by brothers Jean-Pierre and Charles-Henri and sister Marie-Françoise.

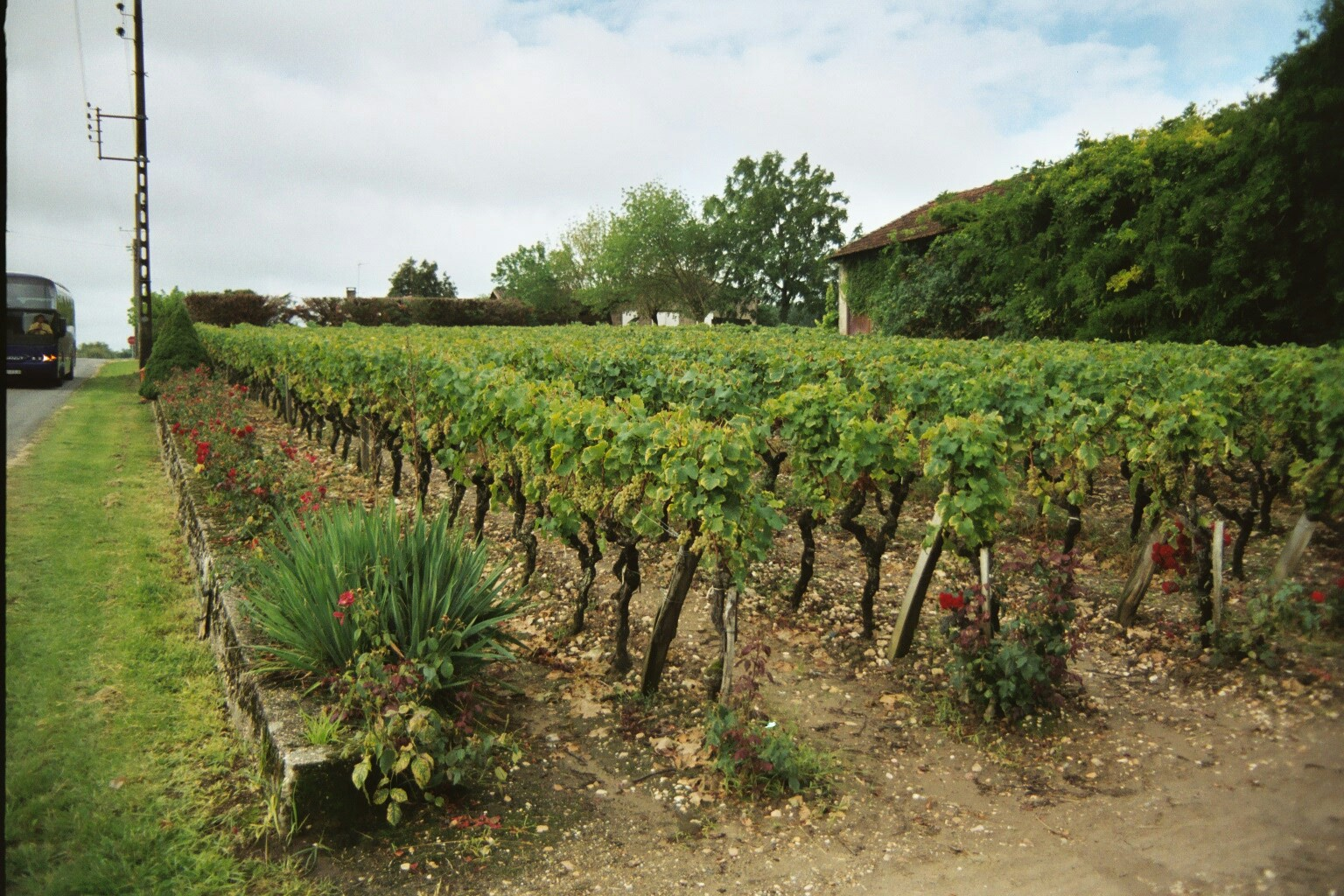
Vines of Raymond-Lafon

== Production ==
The vineyard area extends 18 ha (44 acres) of which 16 ha is under vine. The grape variety distribution is 80% Sémillon and 20% Sauvignon blanc of vines with an average age of 35 years.

The wine is aged for three years in oak before bottling. While the resulting wine will be judged for sufficient quality for use in the grand vin, an approximate 20% may be declassified and sold off in bulk. There is also a second wine named Le Cadet de Raymond-Lafon, previously named Chateau Lafon-Laroze. The average annual production is 20,000 bottles.
