= Château Suduiraut =

Coordinates: 44°33′23″N 0°19′12″W

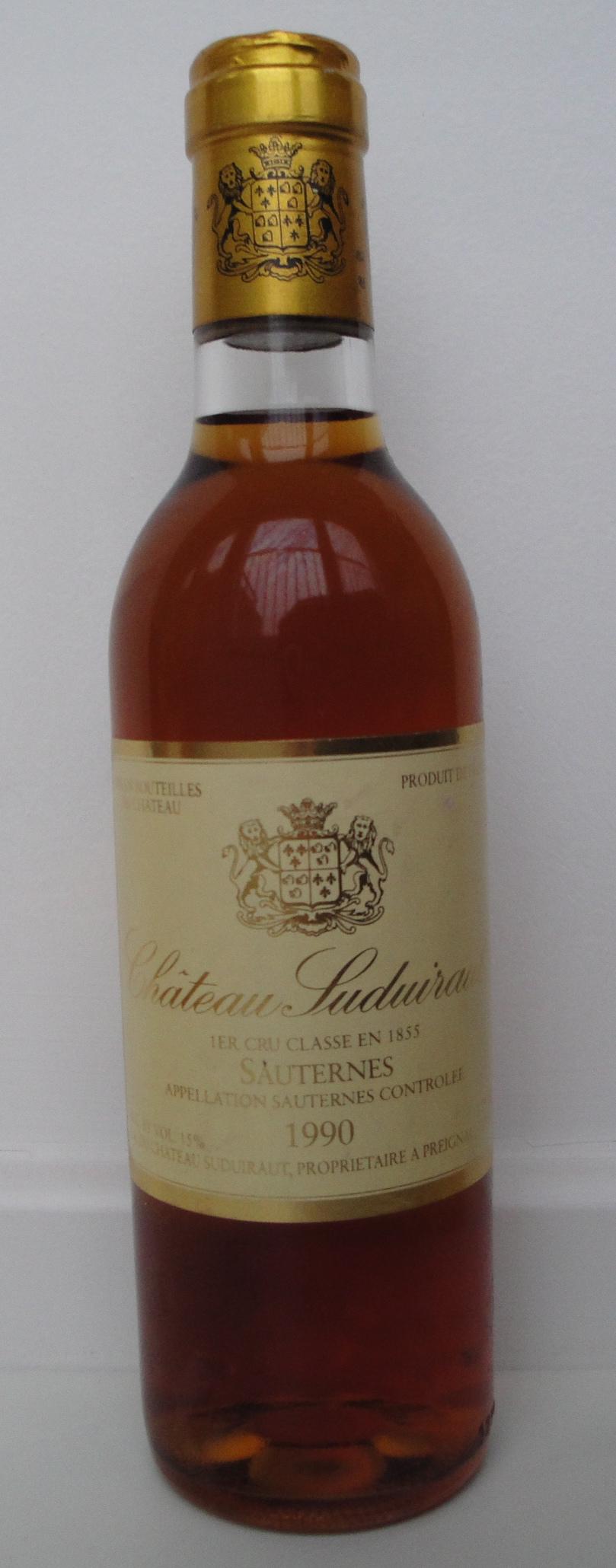
A half bottle of 1990 Château Suduiraut.

Château Suduiraut, formerly Cru du Roy and Château de Suduiraut, is a sweet white wine ranked as Premier Cru Classé (French, “First Growth”) in the original Bordeaux Wine Official Classification of 1855. Belonging to the Sauternes appellation in Gironde, in the region of Graves, the winery is located in Preignac, adjacent to Château d'Yquem.

== See also ==
- Château Raymond-Lafon
