= Highland Distillers =

Former distillery operator in Scotland

- Type: Private limited company
- Industry: Drink industry
- Founded: 1877
- Defunct: 1999
- Fate: Acquired
- Successor: Edrington
- Headquarters: Glasgow, Scotland,
- Products: Scotch whisky

Highland Distillers was a scotch whisky distillery operator and blender in Scotland.

== History ==
Highland Distillers was founded in 1887 by Robertson & Baxter to operate distilleries to supply the blended whisky brands. It operated Bunnahabhain distillery and Glenrothes distillery and in 1892 bought Glenglassaugh distilery. In 1899 Highland Distillers purchased Tamdhu distillery. In 1937 it purchased Highland Park distillery.

In 1970 Highland Distillers purchased Matthew Gloag & Son, producers of the Famous Grouse blended whisky

In 1988 Parkmore distillery was sold to Highland Distillers and the buildings were converted into a whisky warehouse facility

In 1990 Highland Distillers acquired Glenturret distillery and in 1996 acquired The Macallan distillery in Speyside.

Highland Distillers was purchased by the Edrington Group in 1999. William Grant & Sons and the Edrington Group took Highland Distillers private in 2000.

== Distilleries ==
Distilleries operated by Highland Distillers:

- Bunnahabhain distillery
- Glenglassaugh distilery
- Glenrothes distillery
- Glenturret distillery
- Highland Park distillery
- The Macallan distillery
- Parkmore distilery
- Tamdhu distillery

Highland Distillers also produced The Famous Grouse blended whisky.
