= Scotch Whisky Research Institute =

- SWRI
- Location within the City of Edinburgh council area

General information
- Type: Food research institute
- Architectural style: Pagoda roof
- Location: Riccarton, Edinburgh, EH14 4AP
- Coordinates: 55.916°N 3.3218°W
- Elevation: 70 m (230 ft)
- Current tenants: SWRI
- Construction started: 5 December 1995
- Completed: August 1997
- Inaugurated: 15 December 1997
- Client: SWRI

The Scotch Whisky Research Institute (SWRI) is the main, and only, research institute of the scotch whisky industry in Scotland.

== History ==
It was founded on 30 September 1974 as Pentlands Scotch Whisky Research, at the North British Distillery.

It changed to its current name in October 1995. It moved to its present site on 1 August 1997.

Scotch whisky is the UK's fifth-biggest export, and the UK's largest food and drink commodity.

=== Construction ===
The first turf was dug on Tuesday 5 December 1995 by Brian McGregor, the chairman. It was to open in September 1996.

It has a pagoda roof, similar to that developed by the Scottish architect Charles C. Doig.

=== Visits ===
The new research institute was opened at around 2.20pm on Monday 15 December 1997 by the Princess Royal.

== Structure ==
It is funded by over 90% of whisky producers in Scotland, who are also represented by the Scotch Whisky Association and Scotland Food & Drink.

== Research ==
It works with gas chromatography-olfactometry. It employs biologists and chemists.

== See also ==
- Brewing Industry Research Foundation, off the M23 in eastern Surrey
- Diageo Global Supply Centre
- United Distillers (later Diageo) had their Glenochil Research Unit at Menstrie, Clackmannanshire
- Institute of Brewing and Distilling, trade association in London
- International Centre for Brewing and Distilling at Heriot-Watt University
