= Brugal =

Dominican rum company

Brugal & Co.
- Type: Private
- Industry: Drink industry
- Founded: 1888
- Founder: Andrés Brugal Montaner
- Headquarters: Puerto Plata, Dominican Republic
- Key people: Augusto Ramírez Bonó (Managing Director)
- Products: Rum; Liqueur; Alcopop
- Owner: The Edrington Group Limited
- Website: www.brugal-rum.com; casabrugal.com

Brugal & Co., C. por A., doing business as Casa Brugal, is a company in the Dominican Republic that produces a variety of rums. Brugal, along with Barceló and Bermúdez, are collectively known as the three B's. Brugal has a bottling plant in Puerto Plata and a distillery in San Pedro de Macorís. The company is owned by The Edrington Group Limited. As of 2008 it is the market leader for rum in the Dominican Republic, claiming 80% of domestic market, and producing 15 million liters of rum per year.

== History ==
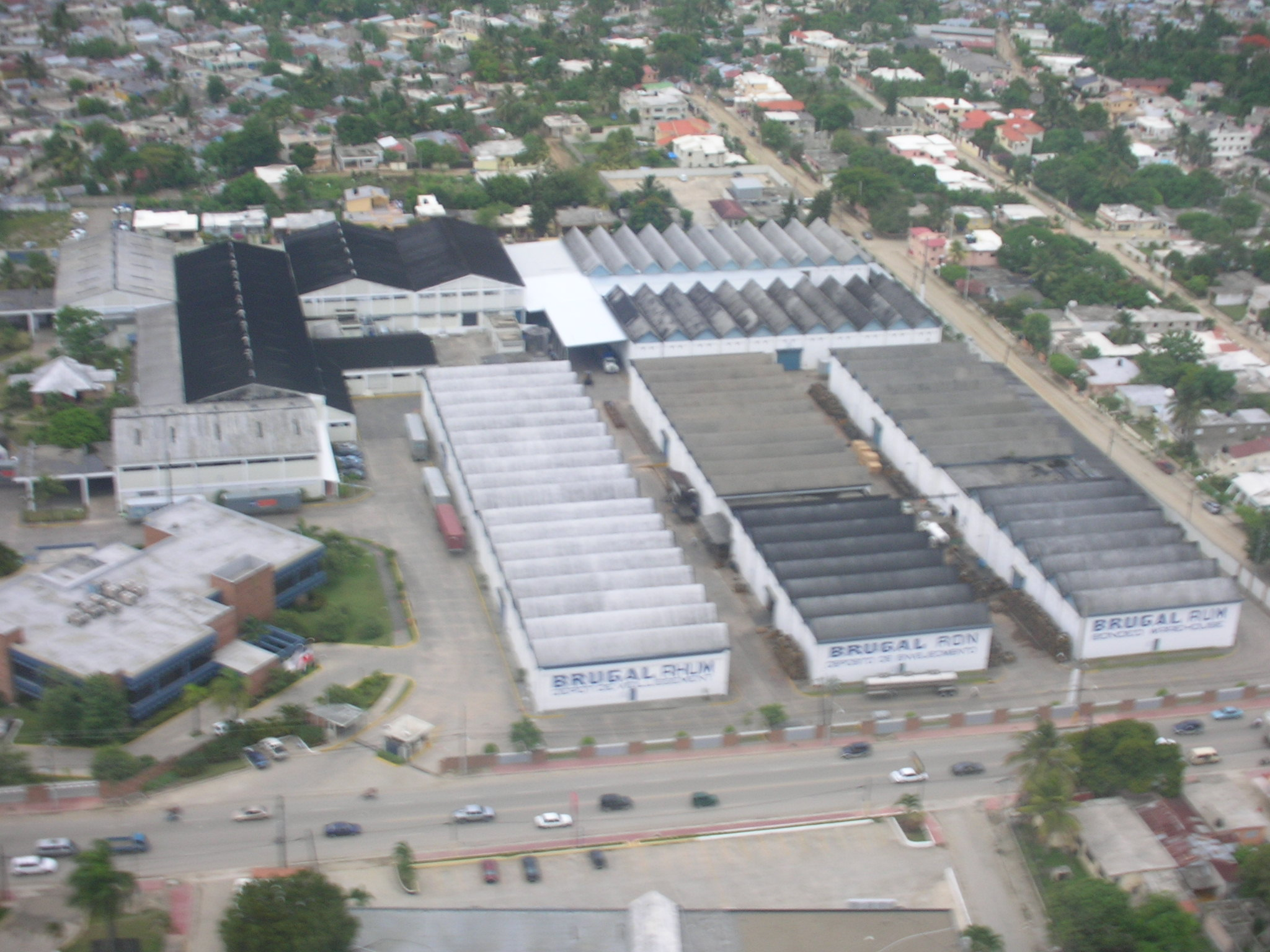
Brugal bottling plant in Puerto Plata

In 1868, Andrés Brugal Montaner migrated from Sitges, Catalonia, Spain to Santiago de Cuba, Cuba. While in Cuba, Don Andrés acquired expertise in the making of rum, and founded Brugal & Co. in 1888. In 1897, he moved to the Dominican Republic and took up permanent residence in Puerto Plata.

From its founding in 1888 until 1920, Brugal exclusively produced white rums. In 1919, Brugal released Ligero y limpio (Light and clean), making it the first Dominican rum producer to sell pure lightly distilled rum which has not been blended by harsher, cheaper, and more flavorful aguardiente. After aging this rum for one year, Brugal released its first gold rum in 1920. In 1952, Brugal began producing Añejo (Aged). In 1976, Brugal released Extra Viejo (Extra Old), the company's first premium rum. In 1988, to commemorate the 100 year anniversary of the company's founding, they released Siglo de Oro (Century of Gold). In 1998 Brugal & Co. launched Brugal Limón, Brugal Pasión and Unico, which were an attempt at entering the flavored rum market, but they were discontinued shortly after. In 2009, Brugal launched Especial Extra Dry (Special Extra Dry), a more premium white rum to replace Blanco Especial, which was discontinued in the spring of 2013. In 2010, Brugal created the country's first double-aged rum with 1888 Doblemente Añejo, aged in ex-bourbon barrels and then finished in Oloroso sherry casks from Jerez, Spain. In 2012, Brugal introduced XV. In 2015, Brugal released Leyenda, a spirit drink consisting of a blend of 80% aged rum and 20% Spanish Oloroso sherry.

Since 1940, Brugal adorned its bottles with a distinctive netting. At one point in the 1980s, the company that made the netting for the bottles was unable to supply enough, so Brugal decided to discontinue the practice. The immediate drop in sales that followed caused Brugal to reverse this decision, and many of their rums continue to be covered in netting to this day.

In the 1970s, due to the lack of road signs in the country and the need to aid in the transport of their rum across the country, Brugal started producing road signs through major towns.

Brugal continued to be a family owned and operated company until a majority stake of just over 61% was purchased in February 2008 by Edrington. George Arzeno Brugal, representing the fourth generation of the Brugal family's ownership of the company, served as chairman of the company until the acquisition. In a press release, the Brugal family assured that production will continue within the Dominican Republic and that they will remain as shareholders and have an active role in managing the company and brand. In 2010, Jasill Villanueva Quintana, great-great-granddaughter of the distillery founder, was named maestra ronera (master distiller) of Brugal. She said that she grew up surrounded by the distillery, and interned there while studying in university. She is the first woman master distiller at Brugal, and as of November 27, 2023, the youngest in the world.

== Production ==
Brugal sources the molasses for its rums exclusively from the Dominican Republic, particularly from the sugar refineries of Barahaia, La Romana, and San Pedro de Macorís, at a minimum of 85 Brix. The molasses is then diluted with demineralized water, and fermented with a proprietary strain of yeast for 40-48 hours. The mash ferments to a wine of 7.5-8.5% ABV, at which point it is distilled using two-column stills, with the first column being pressurized to a vacuum. The first column produces spirit at 90% ABV, which is then diluted back down to 25% ABV, before being distilled once again to 94.6% ABV. This double-distillation to a very high ABV produces a spirit that is very light in flavor and congeners, common in Spanish-style rum production. The distillery has two stills, with the smaller capable of producing 15,000 liters of spirit per day, and the larger one capable of producing 40,000 liters of spirit per day.

The distilled spirit is transported to Puerto Plata, where it is aged. The spirit is diluted down to 65% ABV before being barreled in American ex-bourbon or Spanish ex-sherry casks, destined to be aged for one, two, three, five, or eight years. Some rums are then re-barreled to be aged for several more years, sometimes in a different barrel, in a process that the company calls "double aging". The rum must age a minimum of one year and the barrels cannot be moved or topped up, per Dominican law.

After aging is finished, the rums are briefly rested, before being filtered through cellulose paper and the color made consistent with caramel color.

The carbon dioxide produced by the fermentation is captured and sold to manufacturers of carbonated beverages.

== Products ==
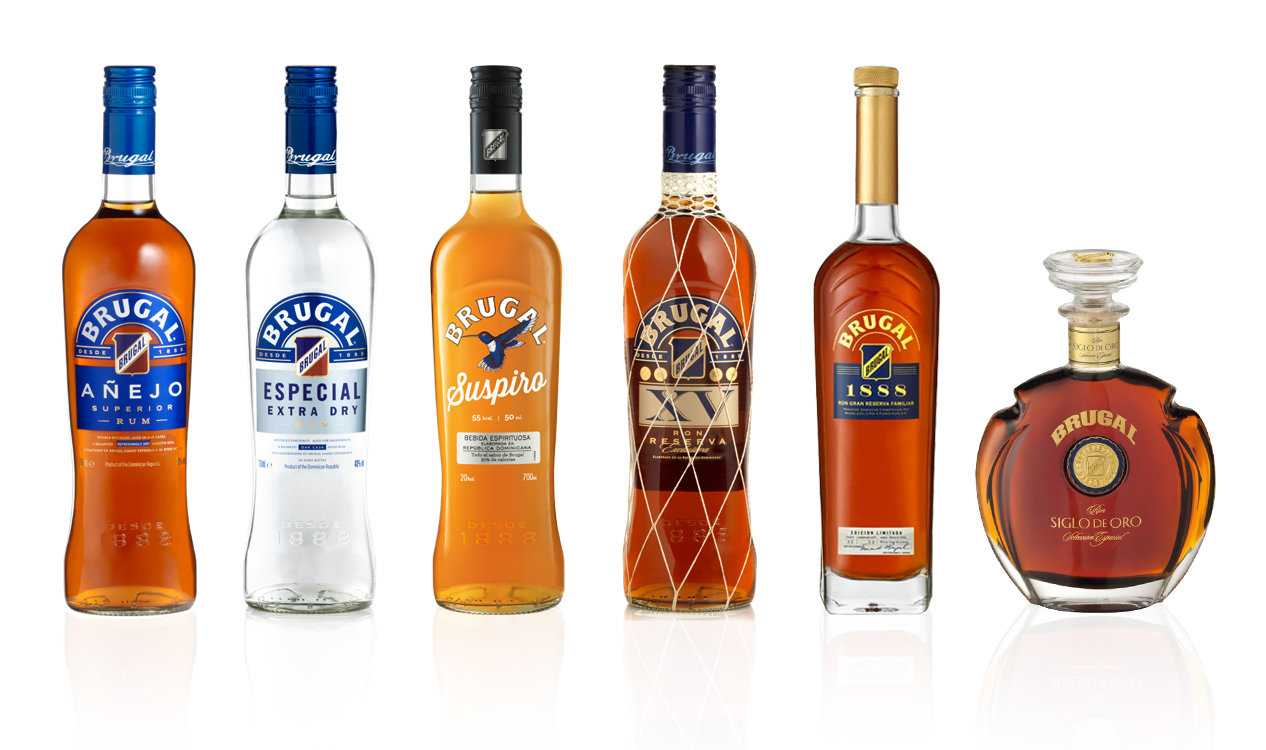
Various Brugal products

=== Core rums ===
- Especial Extra Dry - A blend of rums aged for 2-5 years in ex-bourbon barrels, then triple filtered to remove color.
- Añejo - A blend of rums aged for 2-5 years in ex-bourbon barrels.
- Extra Viejo - A blend of rums aged for 3-8 years in ex-bourbon barrels.

=== Premium Rums ===
- XV Reserva Exclusiva - A blend of rums aged for 3-8 years in ex-bourbon barrels and rums aged 2-3 years in red European oak Pedro Ximenez sherry casks.
- Doble Reserva - A blend of rums aged in ex-bourbon barrels, followed by aging in sherry casks.
- Triple Reserva - A blend of rums aged in ex-bourbon barrels, followed by aging in sherry casks, followed by aging in French oak barrels.
- 1888 Doblemente Añejo - A blend of rums aged for up to 8 years in ex-bourbon barrels, followed by up to 6 years in sherry casks.
- Maestro Reserva - A blend of rums aged for 3-3.5 years in sherry casks, using the Dark Aromatic Toasting method.
- Siglo de Oro - A blend of rums aged for 6 years in ex-bourbon barrels, followed by another 6 years in ex-bourbon barrels.
- Leyenda - A blend of rums aged in ex-bourbon barrels, then blended with Oloroso sherry to be a spirit drink of 80% rum and 20% sherry.

== Awards ==
Wine Enthusiast awarded Extra Viejo scores of "90-95" in 2009, while the San Francisco World Spirits Competition gave it a silver medal in that same year. In 2021, Brugal 1888 won a gold medal at the 2021 International Spirits Competition.

== Gallery ==
Andrés Brugal, founder of Brugal & Co.

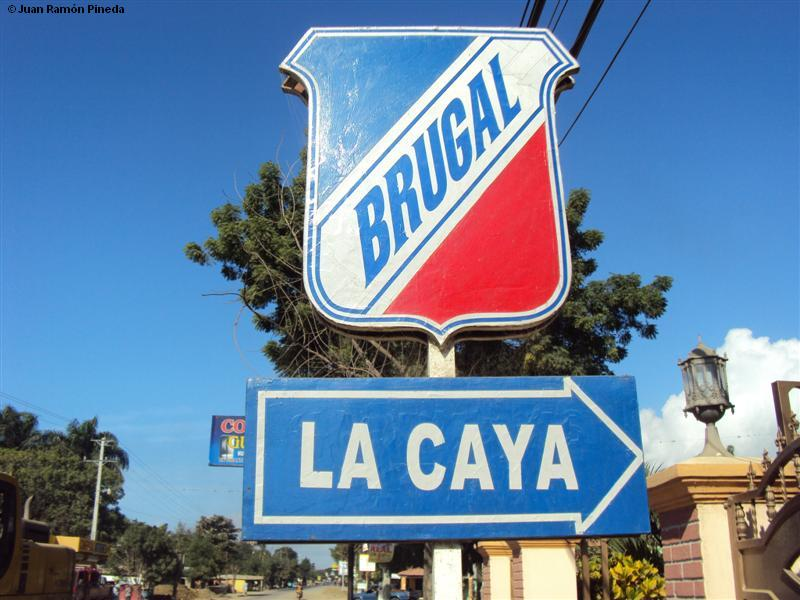
Brugal sign in La Caya.

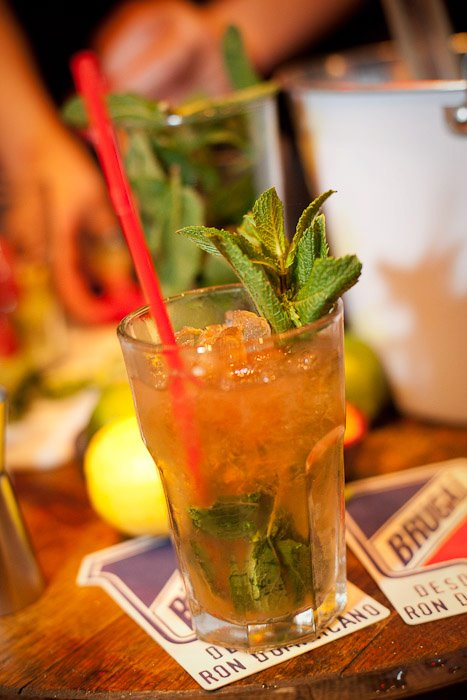
Glass of Golden Mojito with Brugal Añejo.

Bottling Plant in Puerto Plata.

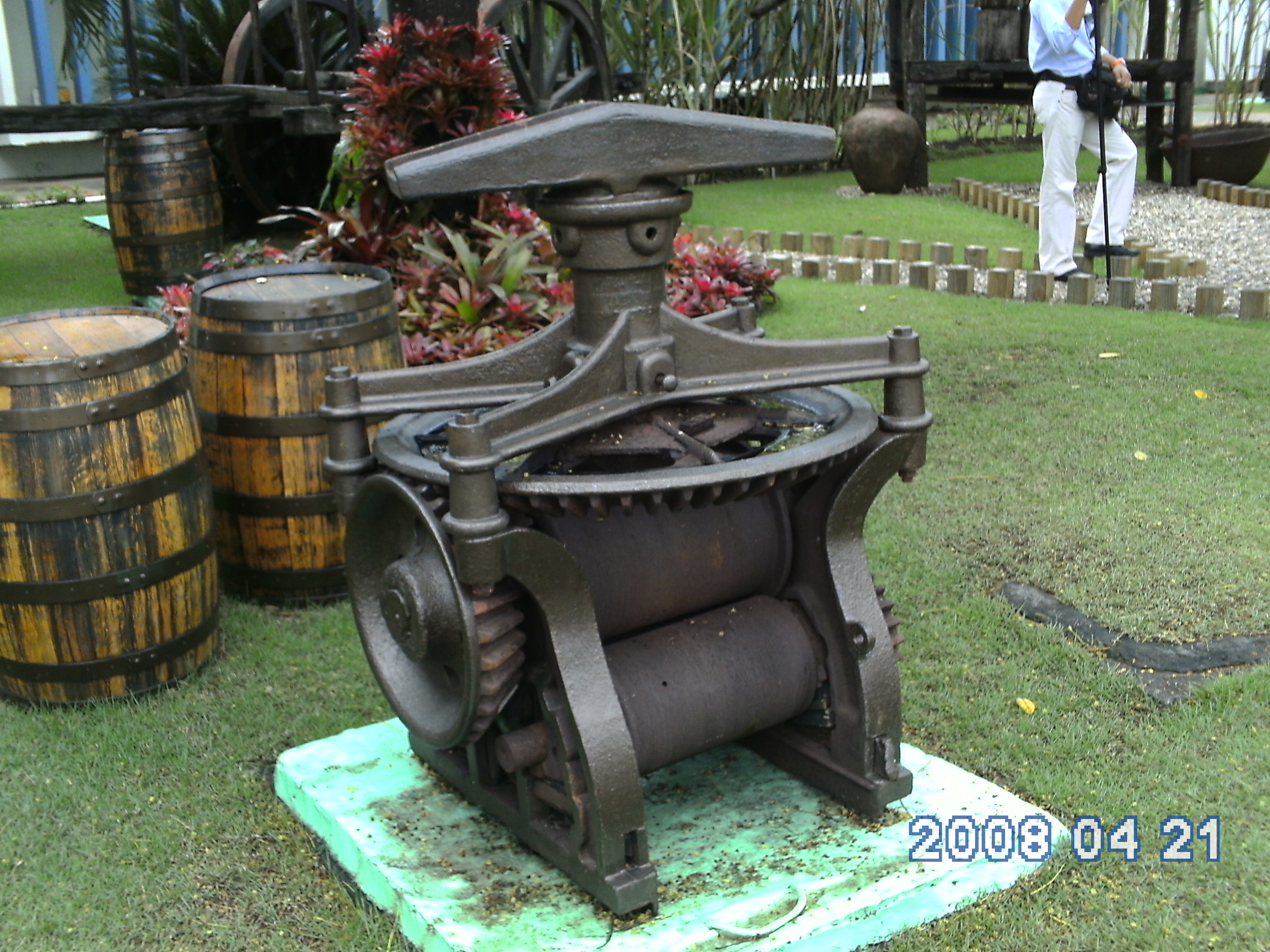
Old trapiche.
