= Valdespino =

Advertising poster of 1913

Valdespino was founded in 1430 and is one of Spain's oldest sherry and Spanish wine producers. The bodega is located in Jerez de la Frontera and produces a range of sherries. From 1883 it has been an official provider to the Spanish monarchy.

Bodegas Valdespino forms a part of Grupo Estévez.
