= The Macallan distillery =

Single malt Scotch whisky distillery in Craigellachie, Moray, Scotland

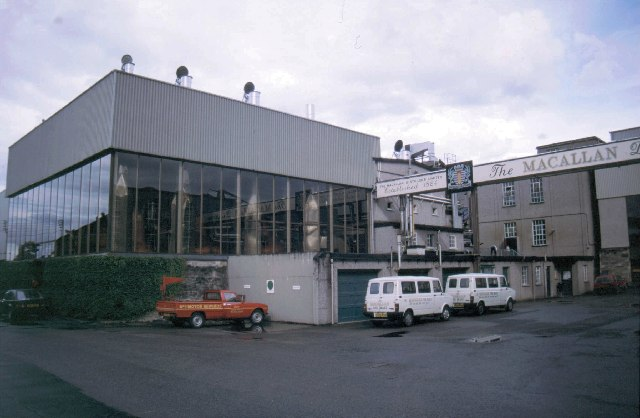

Region: Speyside
- Location: Easter Elchies, Craigellachie, Moray, Scotland
- Coordinates: 57°29′3.74″N 3°12′27.28″W
- Owner: Edrington
- Founded: 1824; 202 years ago
- Founder: Alexander Reid
- Architect: Rogers Stirk Harbour + Partners (2018)
- Status: Operational
- Water source: River Spey
- No. of stills: 12 wash stills (13,000 L); 24 spirit stills (3,900 L)
- Capacity: 15,000,000 L
- Website: www.themacallan.com

The Macallan
- Type: Single malt
- Age(s): 12 to 81 years old
- Cask type(s): Sherry (both American & European oak) and Bourbon (American oak)

Map
- The Macallan (Moray)

The Macallan distillery is a Speyside single malt Scotch whisky distillery in Craigellachie in Moray in the north-east of Scotland. The Macallan Distillers Ltd is a wholly owned subsidiary of Edrington, which purchased the brand from Highland Distillers in 1999.

The Macallan is generally considered to be the second or third highest-selling single-malt scotch, next to Glenfiddich and, by some accounts, Glenlivet.

Originally, the Macallan was matured only in oak sherry casks brought to the distillery from Jerez de la Frontera, Spain. Beginning in 2004, the Macallan introduced a new main product, the Fine Oak series, with the whisky mellowed in bourbon oak casks as well as sherry ones. In 2018, the Fine Oak series was renamed as the Triple Cask Matured range.

== History ==
The Macallan distillery was founded in 1824 by Alexander Reid in Craigellachie. It was initially a farm distillery, and the Macallan name came from the Gaelic word "magh", meaning "fertile ground," and "allan", referring to the local stream.

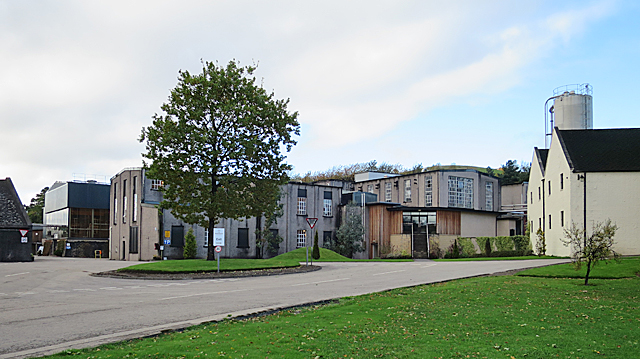
The old Macallan distillery

In 1892, the distillery was able to buy its first large copper pot still, which allowed it to increase production.

After WWI the whisky industry was affected by Prohibition in the United States and the general global economic downturn, but Macallan continued producing Scotch whisky.

In the 1930s, Macallan began to age its whiskies for an extended period, with its 12-Year-Old distinguishing it from many competitors who relied on younger whiskies.

In 1996, Highland Distillers acquired The Macallan distillery.

In 1999, Macallan became part of the Edrington Group, a company that also owns brands like Highland Park and Glenrothes, after Edrington acquired Highland Distillers.This provided the distillery with the financial backing to expand operations further and increase production.

In 2002, Macallan released the Macallan Fine & Rare Collection, a series of rare and aged whiskies from the distillery’s archives. These bottles became highly sought after by collectors.

In 2007, a bottle of 1926 the Macallan was sold at a Christie's auction for $54,000, making it one of the most expensive bottles of whisky sold.

In 2010, a bottle of the Macallan 64-year-old single malt whisky in a one-of-a-kind "Lalique: Cire Perdue" crystal decanter was sold for $460,000 at an auction at Sotheby's in New York City. All proceeds from the sale were donated to charity: water, an organization that helps provide access to clean, safe drinking water to people in developing nations. In 2012, the Macallan received the Guinness World Record for the most expensive whisky sold at auction.

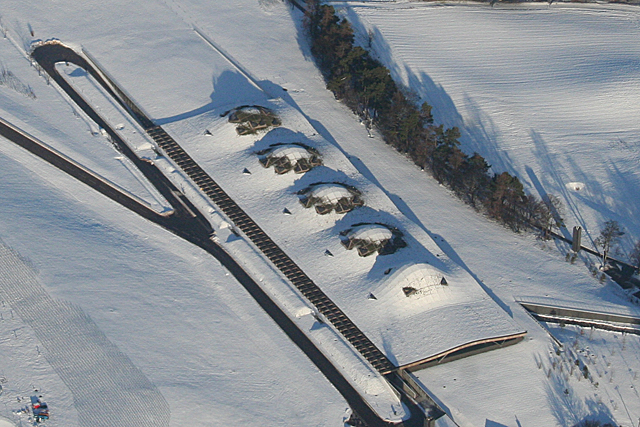
Aerial view of the snow covered new distillery and visitor centre

In 2018 Macallan’s new £140m distillery and visitor center opened. It was designed by architect Norman Foster and constructed by Robertson Group, and featured modern architecture alongside a deep integration into the history and craftsmanship of the distillery. The distillery has 36 stills, comprising 12 wash stills and 24 spirit stills.

In July 2019, the new distillery and visitor experience, on the Easter Elchies estate near Craigellachie, made the shortlist for the Stirling Prize for excellence in architecture. It was designed by Rogers Stirk Harbour + Partners. Also in 2019, the distillery won the RIAS Andrew Doolan Best Building in Scotland Award.

In October 2019, a bottle of the Macallan1926 sold at a Sotheby’s auction for £1.5 million, making it the most expensive bottle of whisky sold at that time.

In November 2023, a bottle of the Macallan1926 sold at auction for £2.1 million, making it the most expensive bottle of whisky sold.

== Whiskies ==
Retrieved from the Macallan official website.

=== Core range ===
- Sherry Oak
  - 12 years old (40-43% ABV)
  - 18 years old (43% ABV)
  - 25 years old (43% ABV)
  - 30 years old (43% ABV)
  - 40 years old (44-45% ABV)
- Double Cask
  - Gold (40% ABV)
  - 12 years old (43% ABV)
  - 15 years old (43% ABV)
  - 18 years old (43% ABV)
  - 30 years old (43% ABV)
- Triple Cask Matured
  - 12 years old (40-43% ABV)
  - 15 years old (43% ABV)
  - 18 years old (43% ABV)
- Rare Cask (43% ABV)
- Estate (43% ABV)
- The Master Decanter Series (Bottled in Lalique crystal decanters)
  - Reflexion (43% ABV)
  - No. 6 (43% ABV)
  - M (45% ABV)
  - M Black (46.5% ABV)

=== Travel retail exclusives ===
- The Quest Collection
  - Quest (40% ABV)
  - Lumina (41.3% ABV)
  - Terra (43.8% ABV)
  - Enigma (44.9% ABV)
- The Concept Series
  - Concept Number 1 (40% ABV)
  - Concept Number 2 (40% ABV)
  - Concept Number 3 (40.8% ABV)
- The Harmony Collection series
  - Rich Cacao (40% ABV)
  - Fine Cacao (44% ABV)
- The Boutique Collection (52% ABV)
- Rare Cask Black (48% ABV)
- Oscuro (46.5% ABV) (Bottled in Lalique crystal decanter)
- The Golden Age of Travel Series (Bottled in Lalique crystal decanters)
  - The Ocean Liner (34 years old; 41.1% ABV)
  - The Aeroplane (35 years old; 43.4% ABV)
  - The Steam Train (36 years old; 43.4% ABV)
  - The Motor Car (37 years old; 42.8% ABV)
  - The Airship (35 years old; 44.4% ABV)

=== Limited releases ===
- The Red Collection
  - 40 years old (48.1% ABV)
  - 50 years old (45.1% ABV)
  - 60 years old (43.4% ABV)
  - 71 years old (41.6% ABV)
  - 74 years old (42.6% ABV)
  - 78 years old (42.2% ABV)
- Distil Your World: London (57.5% ABV)
- Masters of Photography
  - 1 - Rankin (30 years old)
  - 2 - Albert Watson (20 years old; 46.5% ABV)
  - 3 - Annie Leibovitz
  - 4 - Elliott Erwitt
  - 5 - Mario Testino
  - 6 - Steven Klein
  - 7 - Magnum (44% ABV)
- The Macallan 50 years old (44% ABV)
- The Macallan 52 years old (48% ABV)
- The Archival Series
  - Folio 1
  - Folio 2
  - Folio 3
  - Folio 4
  - Folio 5
  - Folio 6
  - Folio 7
- Classic Cut
  - 2017 Release (58.4% ABV)
  - 2018 Release (51.2% ABV)
  - 2019 Release (52.9% ABV)
  - 2020 Release (55% ABV)
  - 2021 Release (51% ABV)
  - 2022 Release (52.5% ABV)
- Exceptional Single Cask
  - 2017 Release
  - 2018 Release
  - 2019 Release
- The Edition Series
  - Edition No. 1 (48.1% ABV)
  - Edition No. 2 (48.2% ABV)
  - Edition No. 3 (48.3% ABV)
  - Edition No. 4 (48.4% ABV)
  - Edition No. 5 (48.5% ABV)
  - Edition No. 6 (48.6% ABV)
- A Night on Earth
  - A Night on Earth in Scotland (43% ABV)
  - A Night on Earth – The Journey (43% ABV)
  - A Night on Earth in Jerez de la Frontera (43% ABV)
- Gran Reserva 15 years old (43% ABV)
- The Macallan Genesis Limited Edition (45.5% ABV)
- Easter Elchies Black
  - 2018 Release (49.2% ABV)
  - 2019 Release (49.7% ABV)
  - 2020 Release (50% ABV)
- The Six Pillars Collection (Bottled in Lalique crystal decanters)
  - 50 years old (2005 release/470 limited units; 46% ABV): Celebrating the Macallan's Exceptional Oak Casks
  - 55 years old (2007 release/420 limited units; 40.1% ABV): Celebrating the Macallan's Natural Colour
  - 57 years old (2009 release/400 limited units; 48.5% ABV): Celebrating the Macallan's Finest Cut
  - 60 years old (2011 release/400 limited units; 53.2% ABV): Celebrating the Macallan's Curiously Small Stills
  - 62 years old (2014 release/400 limited units; 53.1% ABV): Celebrating the Macallan's Spiritual Home
  - 65 years old (2016 release/450 limited units; 46.3% ABV): Celebrating the Macallan's Peerless Spirit
- The Macallan 72 years old in Lalique (2018 release/600 limited units; 42% ABV) (Bottled in the Lalique Genesis Crystal Decanter)

== Bottlings ==
The distillery produces a number of expressions in its core Sherry Oak series, the most generally available being the 12-year-old, although the 18-year-old is widely distributed, alongside a 10-year-old cask strength expression at 58% ABV. Expensive 25, 30 and 40-year-old versions can also be found.

In 2004, the Macallan started to offer single malt expressions vatted with whisky matured in used casks other than ex-sherry casks as part of the Fine Oak range. Macallan also markets special scotches in duty-free shops at airports such as the 1824 Collection and the Quest Collection.

Many rare, special releases and other small production run bottlings also exist.

== Publicity and marketing ==
In 2001, Michael Martin selected the Macallan 10 Years Old as the official Scotch of the Speaker of the House of Commons, even though Martin himself had given up drinking alcohol. He did smell whiskies to make his selection. This selection continued the tradition of the Speaker designating an official single malt. In 2003, the Macallan started laboratory tests to determine if some antique whiskies purchased for their collection were forgeries, perhaps generated by a dealer with mafia ties. In 2004, it was revealed that laboratory testing had determined at least 11 bottles in its antique whisky collection were fakes. Although the Macallan had tested the paper of the labels and were satisfied the whiskies were genuine, additional tests on the contents of some bottles revealed whisky believed to be only 10 years old. David Cox, director of fine and rare whiskies for the Macallan, said, "As a result of these tests from now on, no antique bottles from the antique collection held at the distillery will be made available for sale."

=== In media ===
Macallan whiskies are frequently featured in television and film, including the American TV series Suits, where the main character favours the 18-year old expression, the James Bond Franchise where multiple expressions feature in Skyfall and Spectre, and the Apple TV series, Your Friends and Neighbours.

== Archaeology ==
In advance of the creation of the new distillery and visitor experience, archaeological excavations were undertaken by AOC Archaeology in 2014. The archaeologists found that people had been working in the area in the Middle Bronze Age (radiocarbon dates of 1681–1503 cal BC); had built a small settlement in the Late Bronze Age (radiocarbon dates of between 1050 and 800 BC); then a single ring-ditch roundhouse in the Middle Iron Age (radiocarbon dates of 171 BC - AD 51); another small settlement between the ninth to twelfth centuries AD with two post-ring roundhouses; and a 19th century quarry. There was also some evidence (two stone tools) of people being in the area during the Mesolithic period. All of which indicates that people have been living and working on the site of the distillery for thousands of years.

== See also ==
- List of whisky brands
- List of distilleries in Scotland
