= Highland Park distillery =

Whisky distillery in Orkney Islands, Scotland

Coordinates: 58°58′6.97″N 2°57′19.62″W

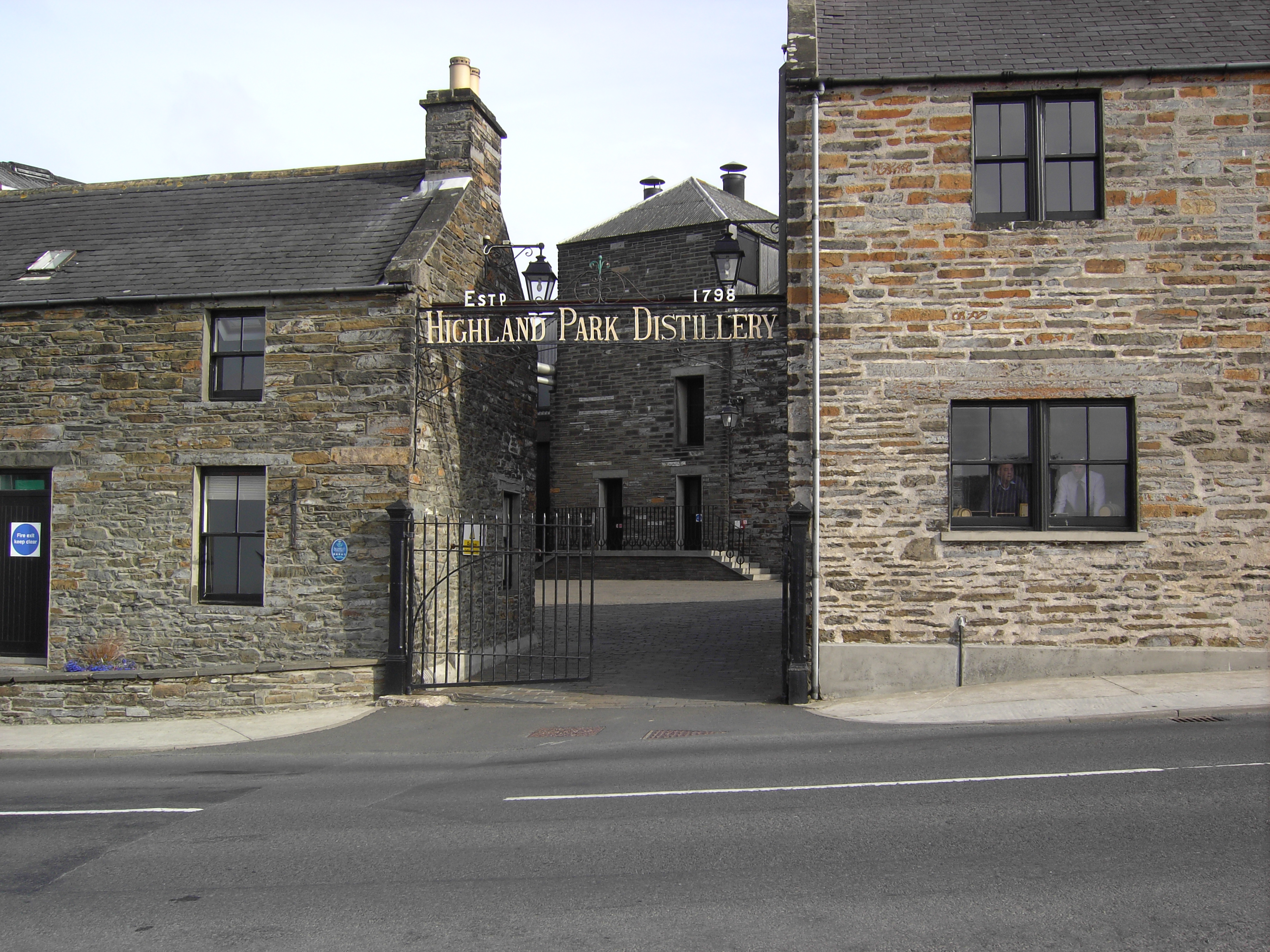

Region: Island
- Location: Kirkwall, Orkney, Scotland
- Owner: Edrington
- Founded: 1798
- Status: Operational
- No. of stills: 2 wash 2 spirit
- Capacity: 2,500,000 litres

Highland Park
- Age(s): (in years) NAS, 12, 14 (duty-free), 15, 16 (duty-free), 18, 21, 54
- Cask type(s): Bourbon; Sherry

Highland Park distillery is an Island single malt Scotch whisky distillery located in Kirkwall on the Orkney Islands, Scotland. It is the northernmost single malt Scotch whisky distillery.

== History ==
Highland Park distillery was founded by Magnus Eunson, a butcher and church officer by day and illicit distiller and whisky smuggler by night. In 1798 he was caught illegally distilling whisky on the site. In 1826, nearly 30 years later, Highland Park received an official licence to distill whisky. The name of the distillery does not refer to the Scottish Highlands, but rather to the fact that the distillery was founded on an area called 'High Park' distinguished from a lower area nearby.

In 1937, Highland Park distillery was sold to James Grant & Sons of Glasgow.

In 1979, the distillery was purchased by The Edrington Group, that also owned The Macallan distillery.

In February 2023, Highland Park released a 54-year-old Single Malt Scotch whisky to celebrate Highland Park's 225th anniversary.

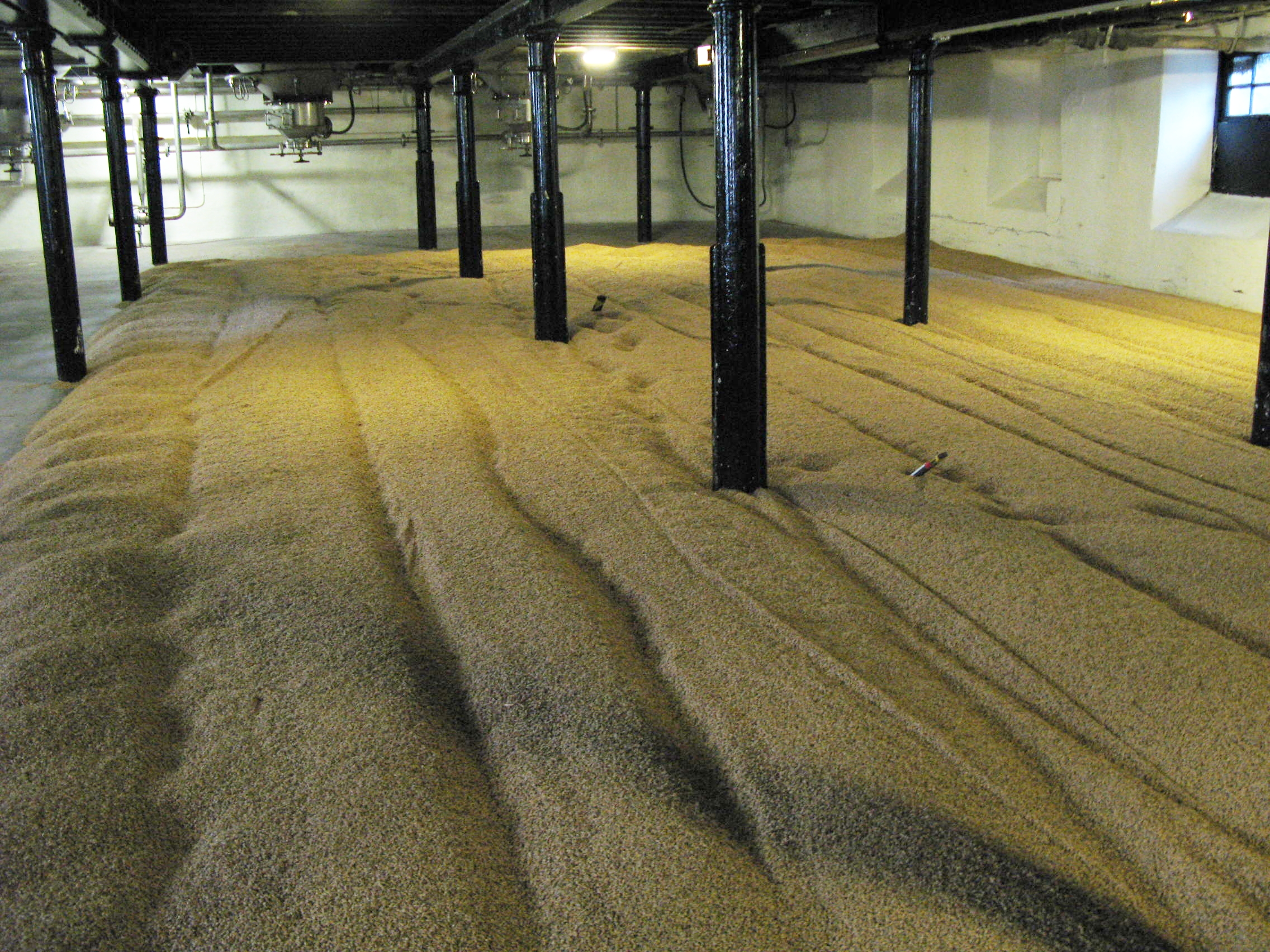
Within the malthouse at Highland Park Distillery

== Production ==
The distilling process at Highland Park is the same as that used at other distilleries.

Highland Park uses the local peat, which contains a higher proportion of heather than many other peats. The whisky is aged in sherry casks made of either American or European oak, purchased from Oloroso sherry producers in Spain.

== Whisky ==
The Highland Park range in 2024 was as follows:

=== Classic collection ===
Highland Park 10 Year Old

Highland Park 12 Year Old

Highland Park 15 Year Old

Highland Park 18 Year Old

Highland Park 21 Year Old 2024 Release

Highland Park 25 Year Old 2023 Release

Highland Park 54 Year Old

=== Special Editions ===
Highland Park Cask Strength Release No. 5

Highland Park Single Cask Series: Cask No. 1494

In 2025, its website also offered a 30 Year Old and a 40 Year Old.

There are also travel exclusives: in 2025, Land of Orkney (14yo), Sea of Orkney (16yo) and Sky of Orkney (18yo), and previously Spirit of the Bear (no age), Loyalty of the Wolf (14yo) and Wings of the Eagle (16yo).

== Awards ==
Highland Park has been named "The Best Spirit in the World" on three occasions by F. Paul Pacult, America's foremost expert on distilled spirits. Its 25-year-old whisky was the first spirit ever to receive a perfect 100-point score at the Ultimate Spirits Challenge. In 2018, two of its special distillery releases, The Light and The Dark, were each awarded a Double Gold medal in the San Francisco World Spirits Competition. In 2019 and for the fourth year running, Highland Park won the Chairman's Trophy for Best in Category at the Ultimate Spirits Challenge.

In 2018, Highland Park ranked second, behind sister distillery The Macallan, in whisky auction sales driven by growing demand from whisky collectors for the distillery's special releases.

== See also ==
- List of distilleries in Scotland
- List of whisky brands

== Notes ==
- Buxton, Ian (2010). A Good Foundation: Highland Park, Orkney, established 1798: a 1924 account of the distillery. Kirkwall: Highland Park Distillery. OCLC 650967730.
- Jackson, Michael (2004). Michael Jackson's Complete Guide to Single Malt Scotch, 5th edition. Running Press. pp. 309–311. ISBN 978-0-7624-1313-3.
- Lerner, Daniel (1998). Single Malt & Scotch Whisky. Könemann. pp. 122–123. ISBN 978-3-8290-0418-3.
