= The Glenrothes distillery =

Whisky distillery in Rothes

Coordinates: 57°31′36.3″N 3°12′59.7″W

Glenrothes distillery
- Location: Rothes
- Owner: Edrington
- Founded: 1879
- Status: Operational
- Water source: Spring on site
- No. of stills: 5 wash stills 5 spirit stills
- Capacity: 5,200,000 L

The Glenrothes
- Age(s): The 15, The 18, The 25
- Age(s): The 32, The 42, The 51

The Glenrothes distillery is a Speyside single malt Scotch whisky distillery located in the town of Rothes in the Speyside region of Scotland. The distillery sits beside the Burn of Rothes, in a glen on the edge of the town.

The Glenrothes does not have a visitor centre or run any public tours or tastings, with visits limited to private invitation only.

== History ==
The distillery was built in 1878 by James Stuart & Co, who then also worked the nearby Macallan distillery. The first whisky ran off the stills on the 28 December 1879, the same day as the Tay Bridge disaster.

The distillery itself had a shaky start and turbulent history. Over-proof whisky is notoriously highly flammable and the distillery has paid the price. Extension work began in 1896 on a second malt kiln, and an increase in stills from two to four but, before the work was finished, a fire in December 1897 caused serious damage. The distillery saw further damage with a serious explosion in 1903.

Then, in 1922, a fire in Warehouse Number One caused the loss of 200,000 imperial gallons (910,000 L) of whisky. Another fire in 1962 afforded the opportunity for expansion and a further re-build in 1982 extended the still hall to five wash stills and five spirit stills.
