= Philatelic investment =

Investment in postage stamps

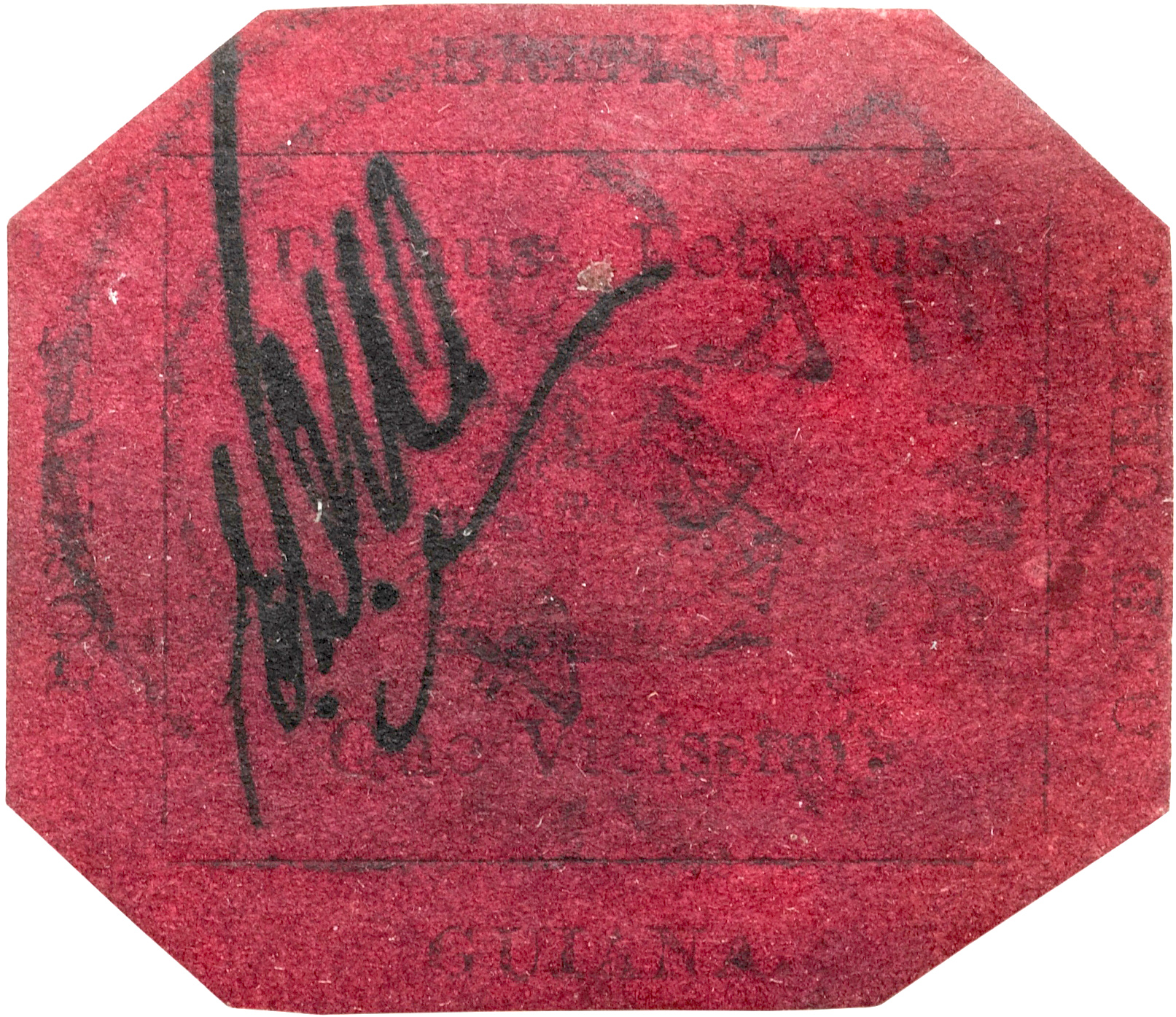
The British Guiana 1c magenta is one of the rarest, and most valuable, stamps in the world. Sold in June 2014 at Sotheby's for $9.48 million.

Philatelic investment is investment in collectible postage stamps for the purpose of realizing a profit. Philatelic investment was popular during the 1970s but then fell out of favour following a speculative bubble and prices of rare stamps took many years to recover.

== Overview ==
Investing in rare stamps requires a high degree of expertise and can be very risky for the novice. Rare stamps are among the most portable of tangible investments, take up little space but require careful storage as condition is one of the most important factors in determining the value of a stamp. Other tangible investments include art, antiques, precious metals, rare coins and many others that are all termed alternative investments. Interest in stamps as an investment tends to increase when traditional investments are not doing well, causing investors to seek alternatives. The increasing age of the population in western countries has also been credited with a resurgence in interest in stamps.

A British auctioneer warned: "Unless you know what you are doing – and this only comes with many years of experience – it is very difficult to buy sensibly and at the right prices. When you buy on a retail basis, you have to overcome the profit margins the dealer has built into his selling price, plus VAT. When you sell, you also have to overcome dealing charges, whether you sell to an auction house or a dealer. That would consume an awful lot of value. To overcome that mark-up and sell at a profit would require quite a few years of appreciation."

== Before investing ==
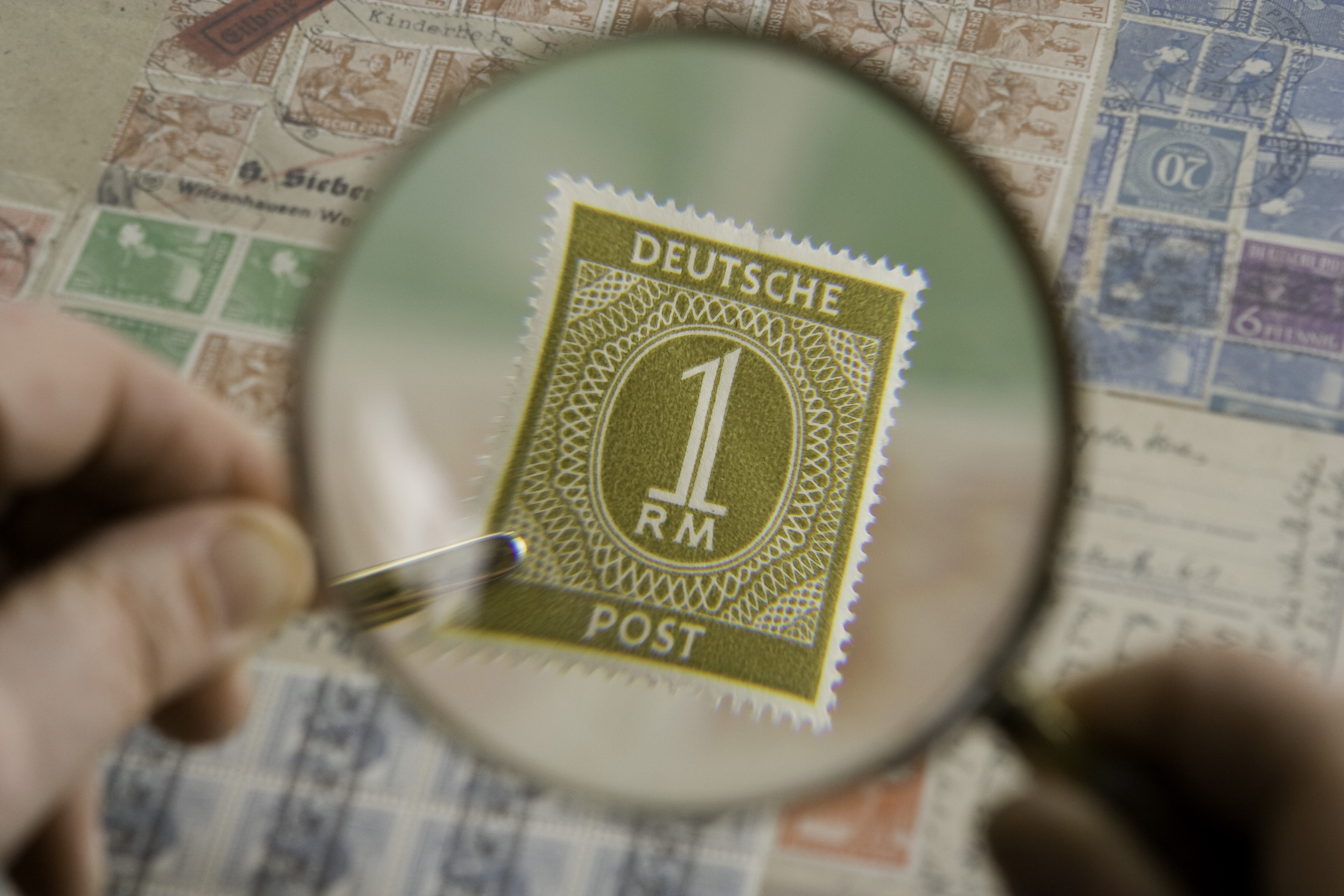
A German 1 Reichsmark stamp. One of the most common and least valuable stamps in the world.

A stamp investor should have knowledge of:

- Classification,
- Condition grading,
- Authentication,
- Handling and storage,
- The stamp market,
- Philatelic literature.

Subtle differences in colour, perforation, overprinting, and other possible defects must be identified to differentiate valuable stamps from inexpensive or counterfeit ones. Prospective investors may also benefit from attending stamp clubs, auctions, philatelic shows and having a relationship with a reputable dealer who may check for alterations or forgeries.

== The value of a stamp ==
The value of a stamp is determined by a number of factors including:

- The number available on the philatelic market,
- Demand from collectors inside and outside the country of origin,
- Condition, a damaged stamp is worth only a fraction of one in fine condition,
- Thematic appeal,
- Perceptions as to current or future value,
- Current events, a news event may temporarily increase values, for instance after the death of Diana, Princess of Wales,
- The place of purchase or sale. Values vary according to where the transaction takes place. Prices vary from country to country for the same stamp and prices realised at an auction may be different from those charged by a dealer or in a private sale between collectors.
- Historical significance and/or the rarity of the postmark on a used stamp.

Rare or unusual stamps can be submitted for Philatelic expertisation. The opinions of experts differ and have evolved over time. Conflicting expert opinions, such as on colour shade or whether a stamp has been reperforated, can have a huge effect on a stamp's value.

== Buying stamps ==
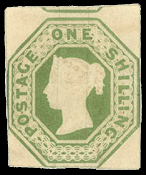
A British 1 shilling embossed stamp, typical of the type included in an investment portfolio.

There are a number of places where a prospective investor can buy stamps:

- The internet,
- Auctions,
- Stamp dealers,
- A few specialised stamp investment firms,
- From a collector in a private sale.

Stamps purchased for investment are usually old classic stamps in fine condition, such as British Victorian stamps or American stamps from before 1900. These may be thought of as the equivalent of buying a blue chip share. Although future prices may vary, as long as there is a hobby of stamp collecting there is likely to be good demand for these stamps.

Stamps included in an investment portfolio will be rare and priced in the thousands of dollars or pounds. However, they usually do not include the rarest items. Those unique stamps are often sold at public auctions for prices near or above $1 million US.

Some collectors and investors also try to anticipate future trends and buy low, this however is difficult to get right and may take a long time to pay off. Investors may try to identify a developing country with an expanding middle class, who may have the time and money to pursue a hobby like stamp collecting, as the developing domestic demand may help to force prices up. Recent examples have been India and China.

Some firms are developing collective or mutual funds where money from many investors is pooled and each investor owns shares or units in the fund. The fund then invests the money in stamps.

== Size of the market ==
Unlike stocks and shares, the majority of transactions in the philatelic or stamp market take place informally, by mail order, or in retail environments, and therefore the size of the market is hard to determine. The market is certainly much smaller than the financial markets but it is not trivial. It has been estimated at £5 Billion. The majority of these transactions, however, are likely to be low value items rather than investments. In a 2007 interview, Mike Hall of Stanley Gibbons estimated that "About $1 billion of rare stamps trade annually in the $10 billion-a-year stamp market." The number of collectors worldwide was estimated at 30 million in 2004. In 2009, Adrian Roose of Stanley Gibbons estimated the figure at 48 million including 18 million in China. It is not known how many of these are serious collectors.

== Historical data ==
While there are long term records of retail stamp prices, the first catalogue being prepared in 1862, there is little objective historical data about the past performance of stamps as investments. No long term indices like the Dow Jones or FTSE Index exist, although some figures have been compiled by Stanley Gibbons and Stamp Magazine in the UK.

From 2002, Stanley Gibbons compiled a SG100 Stamp Index based on retail and auction prices for the "top 100 most frequently traded stamps" in the world. The index appeared on the list of the Bloomberg service but was discontinued and given heritage status. In 2004 they also launched an index of 30 rare British stamps. In 2012 the company launched the GB250 Rare Stamp Index 'to provide a broad view of the investment market for Great Britain stamps', listing the type of stamps they would recommend for investment purposes. The GB30 and GB250 indices are listed on both the Bloomberg Professional service and Thomson Reuters. According to Stanley Gibbons, rare stamps have averaged an annual compound return of 10 per cent over the past 50 years, however, it is important to remember that this figure has been calculated using backtesting as stamp price indexes are a recent innovation. In addition, the prices in the indexes are based in part on Stanley Gibbon's own retail price lists and frequently traded but low value stamps have been excluded from the index.

Stamp catalogue prices are not considered reliable as they are nothing more than estimates at the top end and represent a retail selling price at the bottom end of the market. Auction realisations may be more reliable but are difficult to use as the investor has to personally analyse the realisations from many auctions over a long period of time in order to come to any useful conclusions. While most trading in shares is on a recognised stock exchange and takes place transparently in public, that is not the case with stamps where only auction transactions take place in public view.

== Selling stamps ==
There are a number of ways to sell stamps, as there are to buy, and each has its own advantages and disadvantages.

- Auctions may achieve the highest prices but the costs are also high.
- Dealers may be able to act quickly or pay cash but are likely to offer a price at least one third below the normal retail sale price for the stamp as the dealer needs to make a profit on the transaction. Some dealers aim to double their money on every transaction.
- Private sales. Many sales take place between collectors, however, an investor who is not a collector is unlikely to have the personal contacts to secure such a sale.

There is no equivalent of the stock exchange for stamps.

== Risks and disadvantages ==
Investing successfully in stamps requires a high degree of specialised knowledge. This takes time to acquire and there are many pitfalls for the inexperienced investor. Some of the risks and disadvantages are:

- The return is not guaranteed.
- The cost of buying is high compared to most other forms of investment.
- The cost of selling is also relatively high.
- Purchases may be liable to a sales tax, for instance VAT in the European Union, which the buyer may not be able to reclaim.
- Stamps may need to be expertised, for a fee, to ensure that they are what they appear to be.
- As tangible items, stamps may need to be insured and are at risk of physical damage or deterioration.
- The future market for the sale of philatelic items is uncertain. The demand for philatelic items comes principally from collectors, not investors, and the majority of collectors are aged over 50 in western countries. There are relatively few younger collectors in Europe and North America that would be expected to be the buyers of the future, although anecdotal evidence suggest that may not be the case in India, China and other developing countries.
- In the longer term, the future existence of postage stamps may be in doubt as people use electronic communications more and more and send fewer letters. If stamps are no longer sold for postage they may cease to be collected and if they are not collected, the vital collector demand that underpins the investment market may disappear.
- Stamps have little intrinsic value, they do not have the raw material value of a gold coin, they do not represent a share in a business like equities, and they usually lack the enduring visual appeal of a great work of art.
- Stamp investment is relatively unregulated compared with, for instance, investments in a mutual fund and investors may have little protection if things go wrong.
- The size of the philatelic market is small compared to the value of the stock market and vulnerable to aggressive buying by speculators, which may distort prices. This happened in the 1970s when a speculative bubble was followed by a collapse in prices.
- Stamps do not generate any interest or dividends.
- It may be impossible to determine the current market value of the stamps without selling them.
- Stamps packaged as "investment portfolios" may be charged at prices higher than their normal market value.
- There is very little reliable and independent historical information about the performance of stamps as investments.
- A long-term view is necessary. A quick purchase and sale is unlikely to be profitable.
- When more traditional investments are doing well, interest in alternative investments like stamps may quickly wane.
- Special instructions will need to be given to spouses or executors in the event of the owner's incapacity or death as they may be unfamiliar with philatelic items.
- Stamps may take time to be sold unlike cash, equities or mutual funds which can usually be realised with minimal delay.

== Advantages ==
- Stamps are not highly correlated with other forms of investment and may therefore represent a valuable diversification within a wider portfolio.
- Stamps are highly portable stores of wealth and are easily transported over national borders.
- An ageing population in western countries means that investors approaching retirement may resume childhood hobbies, thus increasing demand.
- There are millions of enthusiastic stamp collectors around the world creating a global marketplace.
- There is a finite supply of classic stamps.
- Stamps are not a financial asset and so may perform better than cash in times of high inflation.
- As a tangible asset, a stamp cannot go out of business like a company quoted on the stock market.
- Stamps are a relatively confidential investment. Unless bought at a public auction, ownership is private and there is no public register as there is for many investments in equities.
- The investor is able to hold and admire his investment, and enjoy its aesthetic aspects.
- Many stamps have an interesting historical background.

== Regulation and investor protection ==
Stamps purchased for investment do not normally have any special regulatory protection for the purchaser. In the United Kingdom there is no regulation of this area at all from the Financial Conduct Authority. Rules elsewhere may vary. Where investment is collective through a mutual fund there may be some regulation of the activities of the fund depending on its location.

== Stamp investment scandals ==
There have been a number of scandals in this area over the years.

In Ireland in the 1950s, Paul Singer, a Bratislavian Doctor of Philosophy, ran a Ponzi scheme under the name Shanahan Stamp Auctions. The scheme collapsed when a mysterious robbery took place at the company's office on 9 May 1959, the eve of a major auction, when more than £300,000 worth of stamps went missing. Singer was charged with fraud, but was acquitted and vanished.

In the 1970s, the bursting of a speculative bubble left investors unable to realise their investment at the price they had paid. Prices took decades to recover.

In 2006, two Spanish firms Afinsa and Forum Filatelico collapsed and left around 350,000 investors with investments worth as little as 10% of the price they had paid.

In November 2017 it was announced that Stanley Gibbons' stamp investment subsidiary in Guernsey had been placed in administration. The company was reported to have £12.6 million of philatelic stock but over £70m of liabilities, made up of £54m of "buy-back" guarantees, £6.5m owed to its parent company, and £11m of sundry liabilities.

== See also ==
- Alternative investment
- Traditional investments
- List of most expensive philatelic items
