= Investment wine =

Alternative investment

Investment wine, like gold bullion, rare coins, fine art, and tulip bulbs, is seen by some as an alternative investment other than the more traditional investment holdings of company shares, bonds, cash, or real estate. While most wine is purchased with the intent of consuming it, some wines are purchased with the intention to resell them at a higher price in the future. A wine's value often goes up as time passes and consumption increases as the market becomes tighter and access to good wine is more elusive.

== Background ==
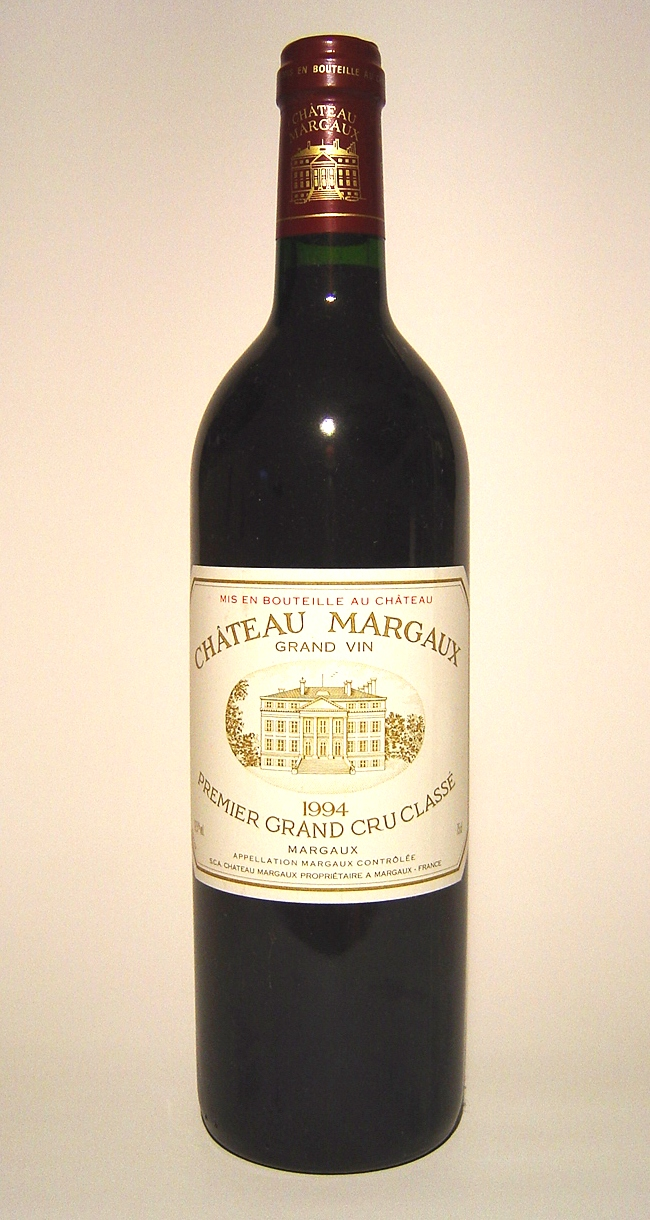
Château Margaux, a First Growth from the Bordeaux region of France, is highly collectible.

Wine investment is usually conducted through one of two main methods. The first involves purchasing and reselling individual bottles or cases of particular wines (wine for investment tends to be sold in sets of 3, 6, 9, 12, or 13). The other option is purchasing shares in an investment wine fund that pools the investors' capital. In the former instance (directly buying specific cases of wine), it is recommended that inexperienced investors work with a broker, merchant, or a consultant, to minimize risk. Many authorities also publish independent guides for the investor to help navigate this investment class. Indeed, complex models and formulae have been applied to tracking investment wine's historical returns.

While there may be tens of thousands of wine producers across the globe, it is estimated that perhaps only 250 produce the sort of premier wines that are worth considering as a financial investment. It is also estimated that about 90 percent of the world's investment grade wine is produced in the Bordeaux region of France, which explains why the region is the main target for investment wine fraudsters. Vintage ports historically have made up much of the rest of the market inventory, but now more and more varied and global selections of wines are finding their way into the investor market.

Outstanding vintages from the best vineyards may sell for thousands of dollars per bottle, though the broader term "fine wine" covers bottles typically retailing at over about US$30–50. Investment wines are considered by some to be Veblen goods; that is, demand for them increases instead of decreases as the price rises. The most common wines purchased for investment include those from Bordeaux, Burgundy, cult wines from Europe and elsewhere, and Vintage port.

== History ==
While premium wines have been around for centuries, the formal and organized sale and resale of the best wines for profit became a more established phenomenon in the late 1970s and early 1980s. Indeed, at least in the United States in the 1960s and early 1970s, newspaper articles about investing in wine were more likely to warn that it is illegal for individuals to sell wine, and that the "investment" would be drunk by the investor.

However, by the mid-1980s, in the state of Illinois, and in special cases in California, it was legal to sell wine without a retail license, and more investors were learning how to transact their trades through legal brokers with the necessary licenses. In Europe, laws are much less restrictive regarding wine selling and reselling. In the 2020s, a few companies such as WineFi have been established to specialize in wine investing.

== Drawbacks ==
Wine as an investment does have some concerns, including the fact that (unlike dividend-paying stocks and bonds) stored wine produces no return for the investor until it is sold, and insurance and storage costs will mean the investor is losing money while waiting for the wine's value to appreciate. There is low liquidity in US wine inventory, as most US states will only allow private wine sales through auctions, which themselves may take a commission of 15% to 25%. Investment in fine wine has attracted fraudsters both in the UK and US, who prey on their victims' ignorance of this sector of the wine market. Losses by investors to rogue wine investment firms can be significant, made more acute by the fraudsters willing to re-offend. Wine fraud often works by charging excessively high prices for off-vintage or lower-status wines from famous wine regions, while claiming that it is a sound investment unaffected by economic cycles. Efforts made by regulators to stem losses to rogue investment firms include the closing down of companies in the public interest, and cease and desist orders.
