= Tangibility =

Ability of something to be perceived by the senses

Tangibility is the property of being able to be perceived, especially by the sense of touch. Metaphorically, something can also be said to be "cognitively tangible" if one can easily understand it.

== Law ==
In criminal law, one of the elements of an offense of larceny is that the stolen property must be tangible.

In the context of intellectual property, expression in tangible form is one of the requirements for copyright protection. For example, in the United States, Title 17 of the United States Code, Section 102, states that a work becomes copyrighted when "fixed in any tangible medium of expression". This includes literary works, music, dramatic works, pantomimes, choreography, films, sound recordings, and architectural works.

In the context of international tax law, article 5(1) of the OECD Model Tax Treaty requires to date a permanent establishment to consist of a tangible place of business. This is problematic concerning the taxation of the Digital Economy.

== Business ==
In the context of business, the tangibility of products and services lies on a spectrum between pure goods and pure services. For example, bread and television are considered tangible goods, whereas air travel and investment banking are considered intangible services.

Tangibility may have both negative and positive effects on a business. For example, in the Pakistani textile industry, the tangibility ratio negatively correlates with return on assets. However, tangibility can also make handling conflicts easier from the point of view of agency theory.

== In other fields ==
The concept of tangibility can be used in software design. For example, this idea helped shape the Onboard Context-Sensitive Information System (OCSIS) developed for use by airplane pilots. In particular, it helped decide whether or not OCSIS should be handheld, or how it should display the weather.

== See also ==
- Tangible property
- Tangible media
- Tangible user interface
- Tangible investment
- Tangible common equity
