= Shipping investments =

Shipping investments are a form of alternative investment into an asset related to worldwide shipping. This could be into ships themselves, or a related asset such as shipping container, with the expectation of capital appreciation, dividends, and/or interest earnings.

== History ==
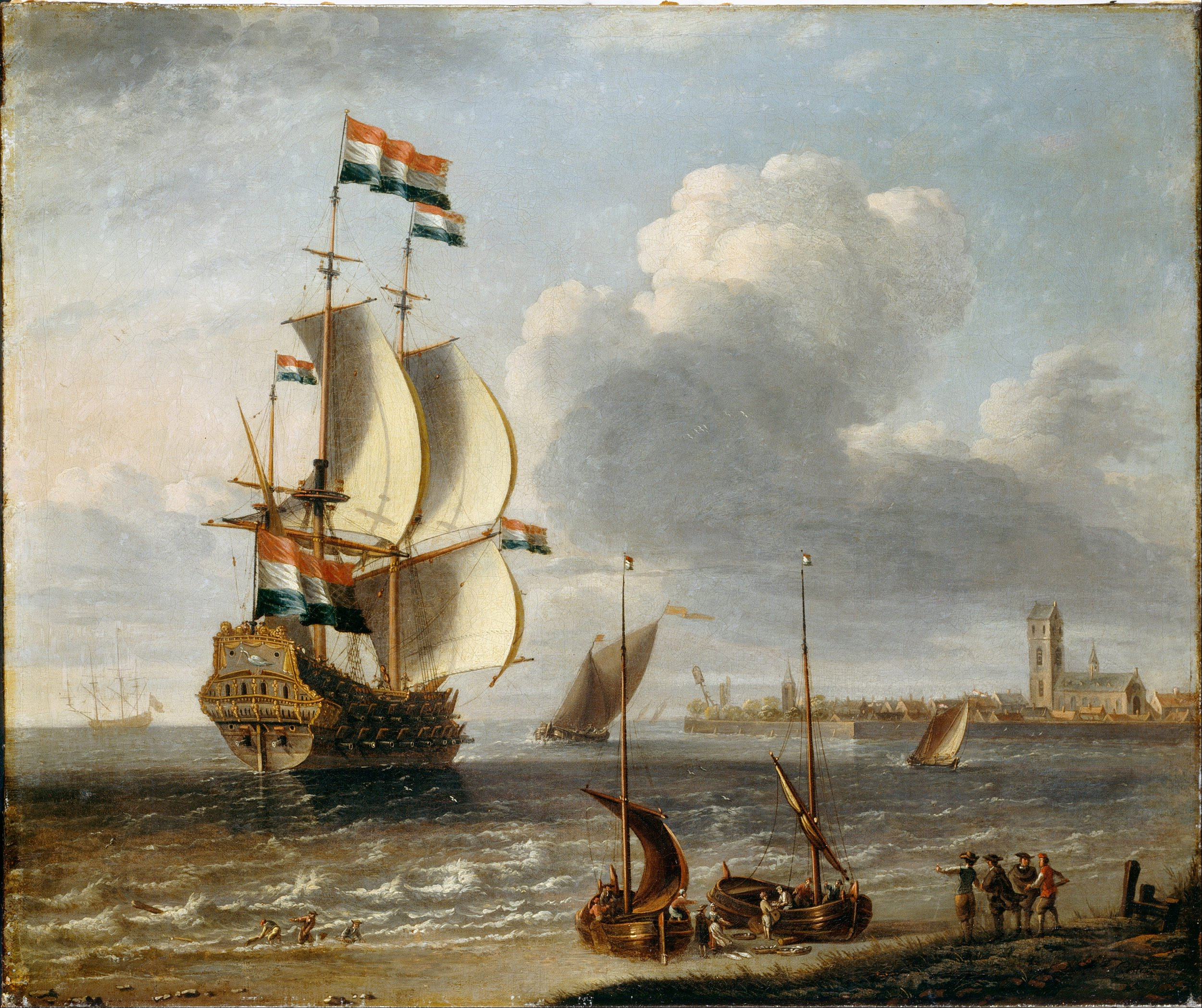
A Dutch East India company ship off Cape of Good Hope in Africa on its way to the East Indies

Shipping investment has a long history and led to development to stock exchanges and insurance. In the 1600s Dutch ships would travel to the East Indies for spices and other goods. These voyages were risky and so Captains would seek investors to share the risk for a percentage of the profit on return. This was an early investments in shipping by those investors. Eventually, shipping companies formed such as the Dutch East India Company to help spread the risk and increase profits.

== Characteristics ==
Some of the characteristics of shipping investments may include:

- Low correlation with traditional financial investments such as stocks and bonds
- Considered to be a relatively liquid investment as there is a second-hand market for shipping assets
- Considered to be a cyclical industry, with long supply and demand cycles since ships are large physical assets that take time to build, transport and dispose of
- Costs of purchase and sale may be moderately high
- There may be limited risk and return data

=== Ship ownership ===
Investment in ships involves purchasing or leasing new or second-hand vessels and either operating them directly or chartering them to other operators. Investors seek either profits generated from shipping fees, capital appreciation of the vessels themselves, or both. Due to the high capital commitments involved, ship investment has tended to be limited to ultra high net worth individuals and syndicates.

In the UK, investments in cargo ships can qualify for the Enterprise Investment Scheme, making it possible for individual investors to access ship ownership as an asset class.

=== Shipping containers ===
Investment in shipping containers involves purchasing a container and having an external company manage and lease the containers to merchants. Investors are often promised high rates of return based on purportedly growing demand from cargo ships preferring to lease containers instead of buying them. The Freightos Baltic Index is an example of an index that is published daily showing the global container freight rates.

The industry is known to have been targeted by scams, particularly in the form of Ponzi schemes.

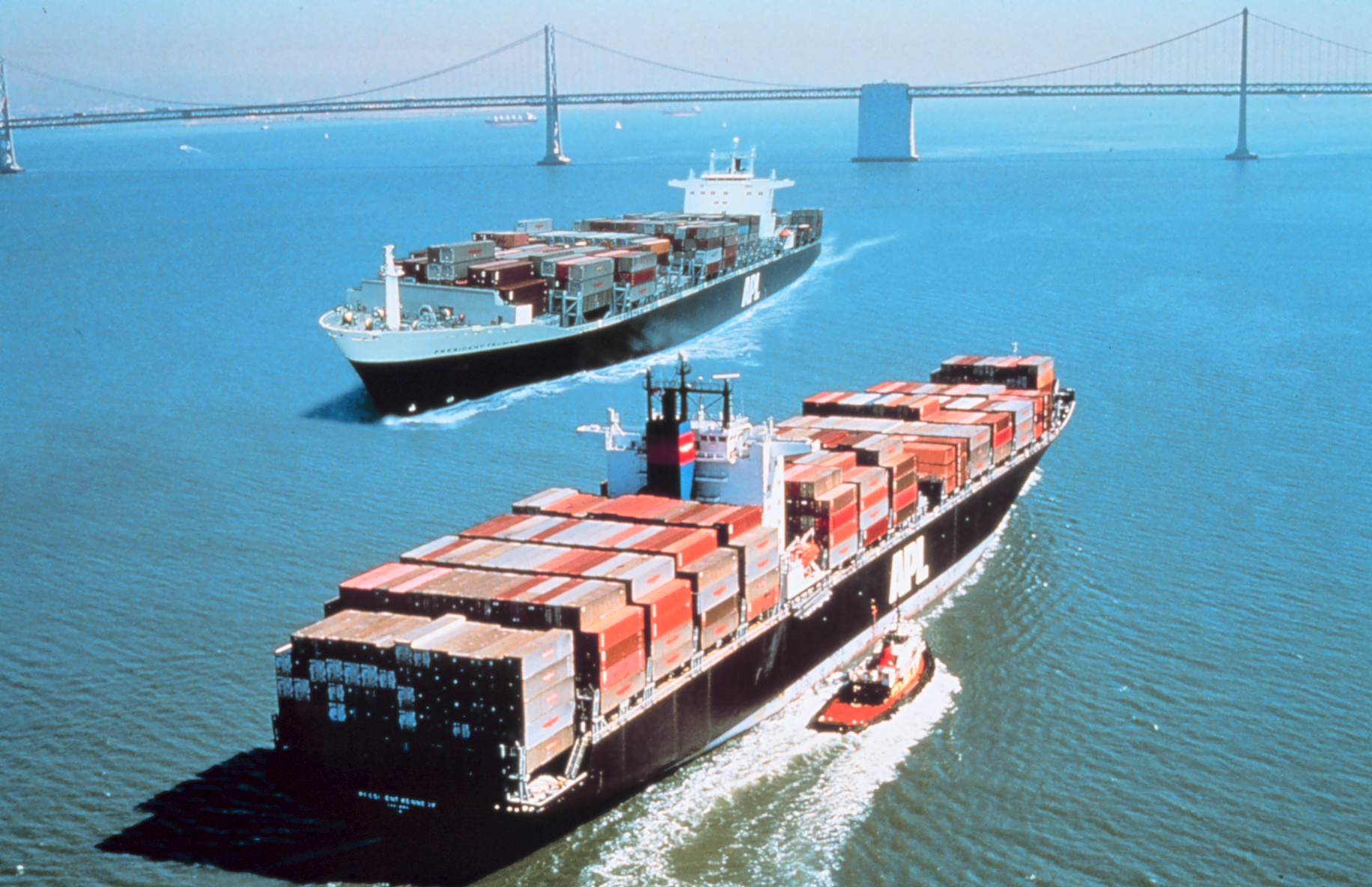
Container Ship

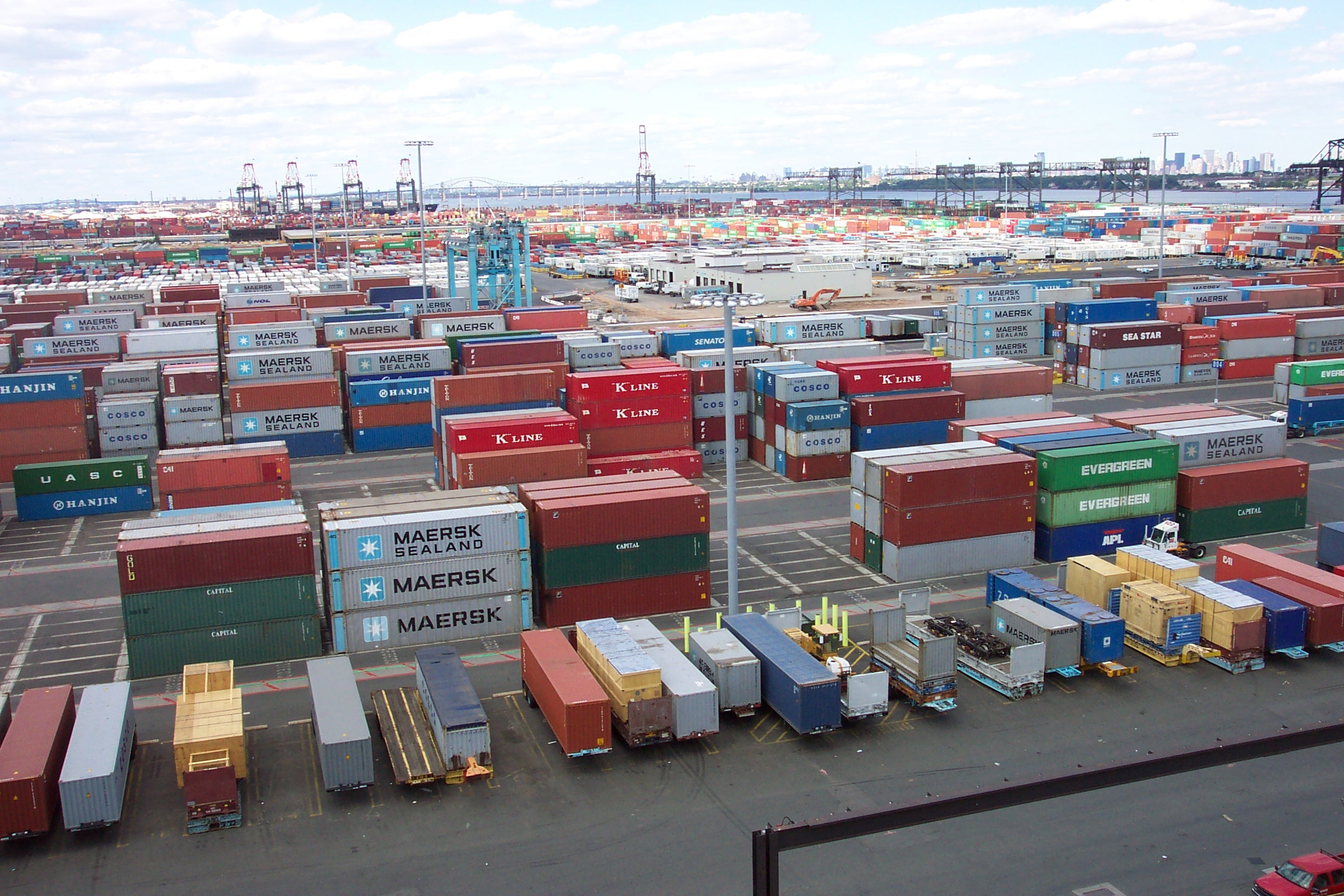
Port Elizabeth, New Jersey

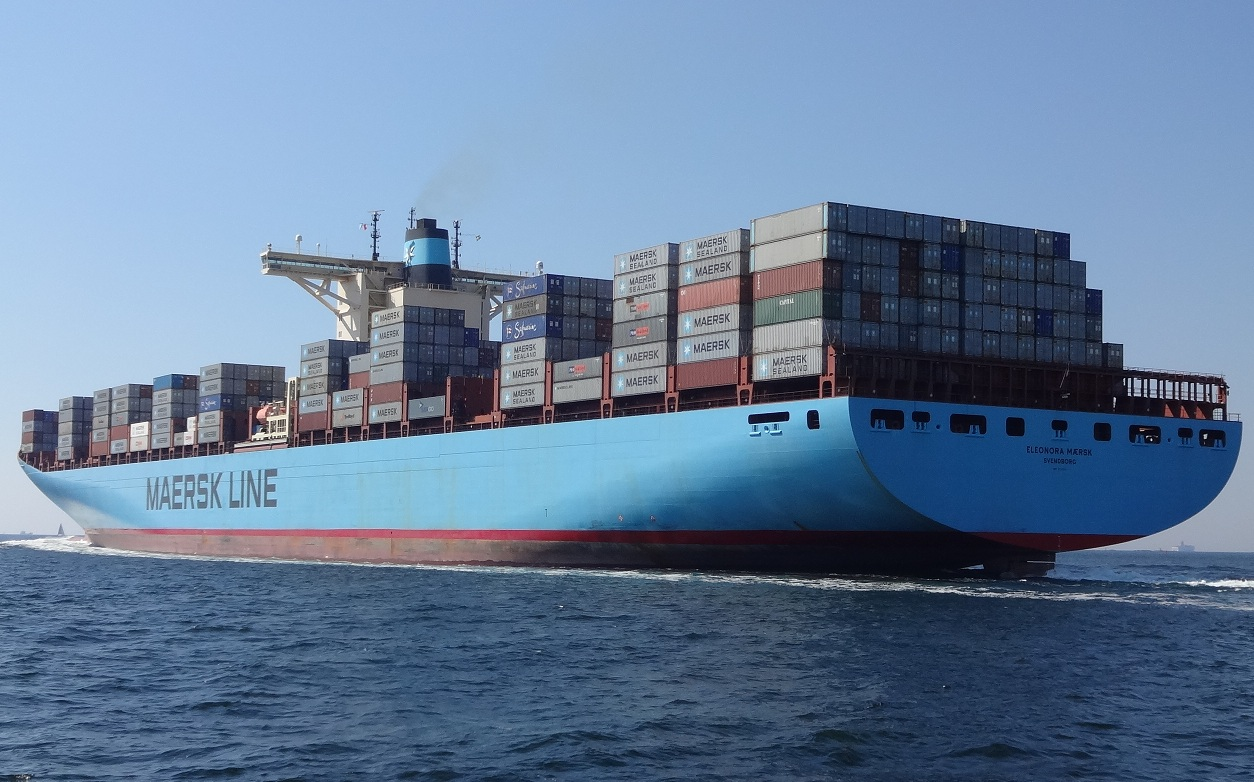
The Eleonora Maersk, a large container ship

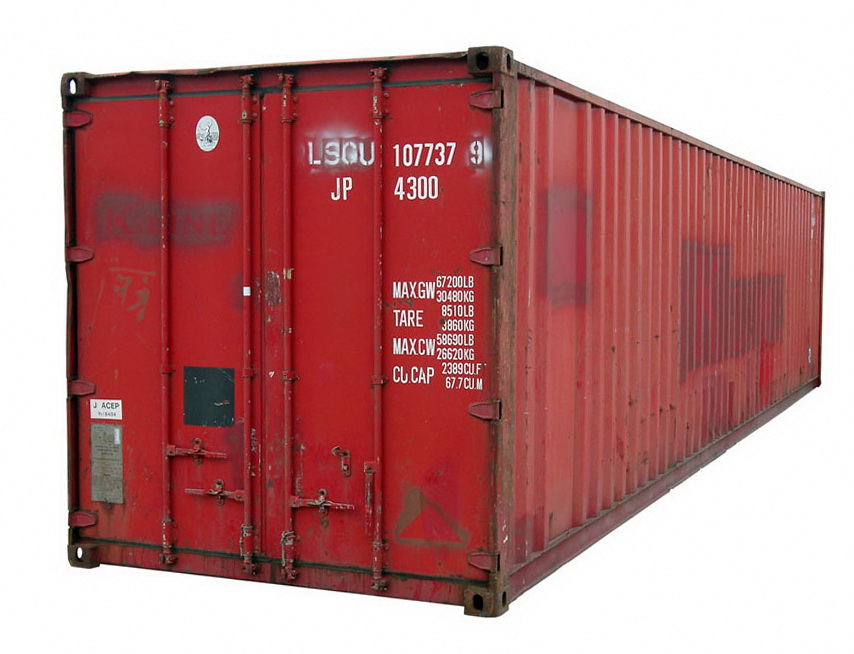
A typical container

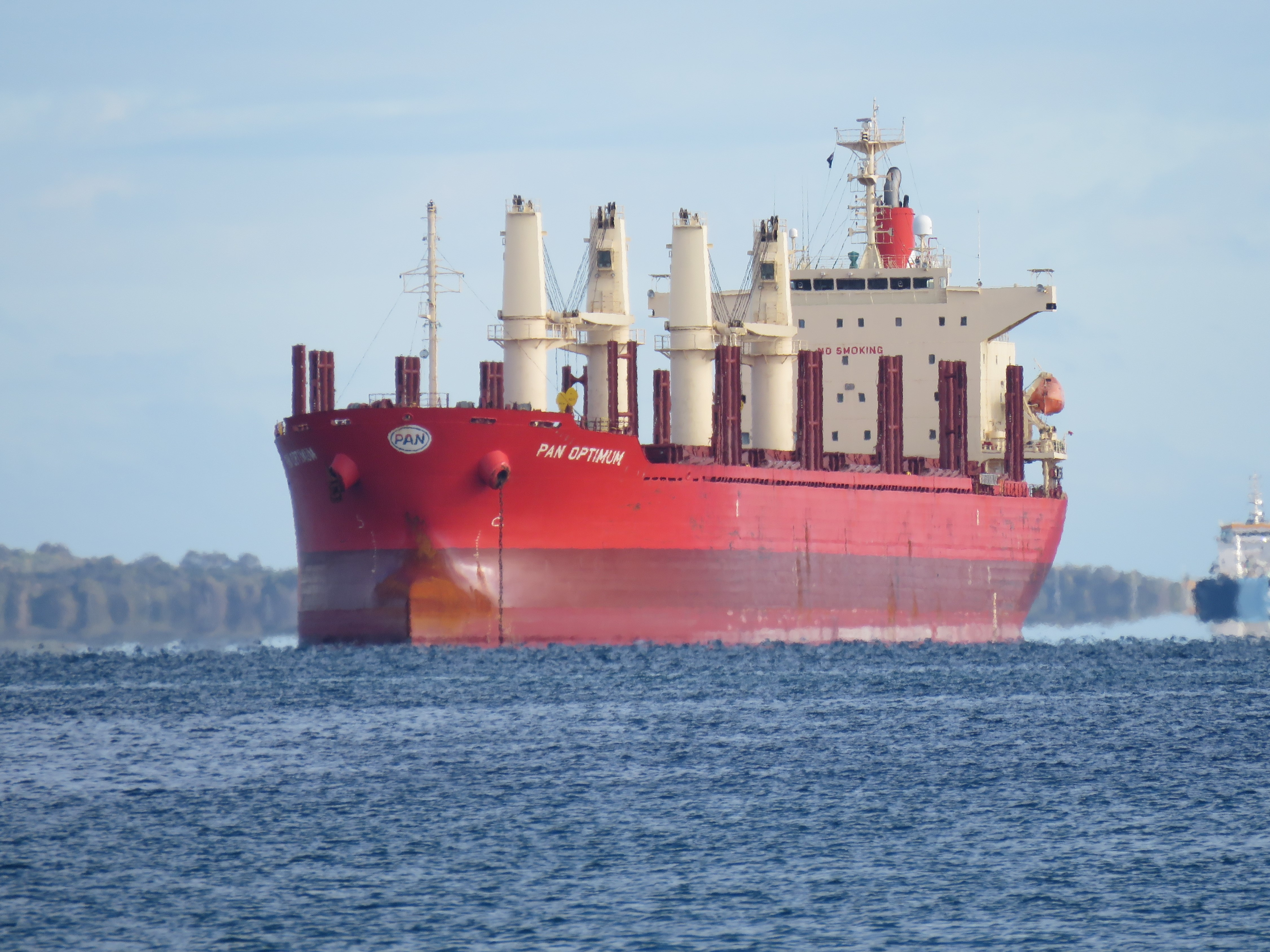
A bulk carrier, Pan Optimum showing non container shipping

== See also ==
- Alternative investment
- Gold as an investment
- Shipping markets
- Traditional investments
