= Berry Bros. & Rudd =

British wine and spirit merchant

Coordinates: 51.50558°N 0.13813°W

BB&R Limited
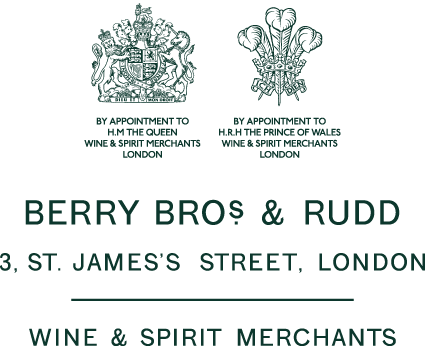

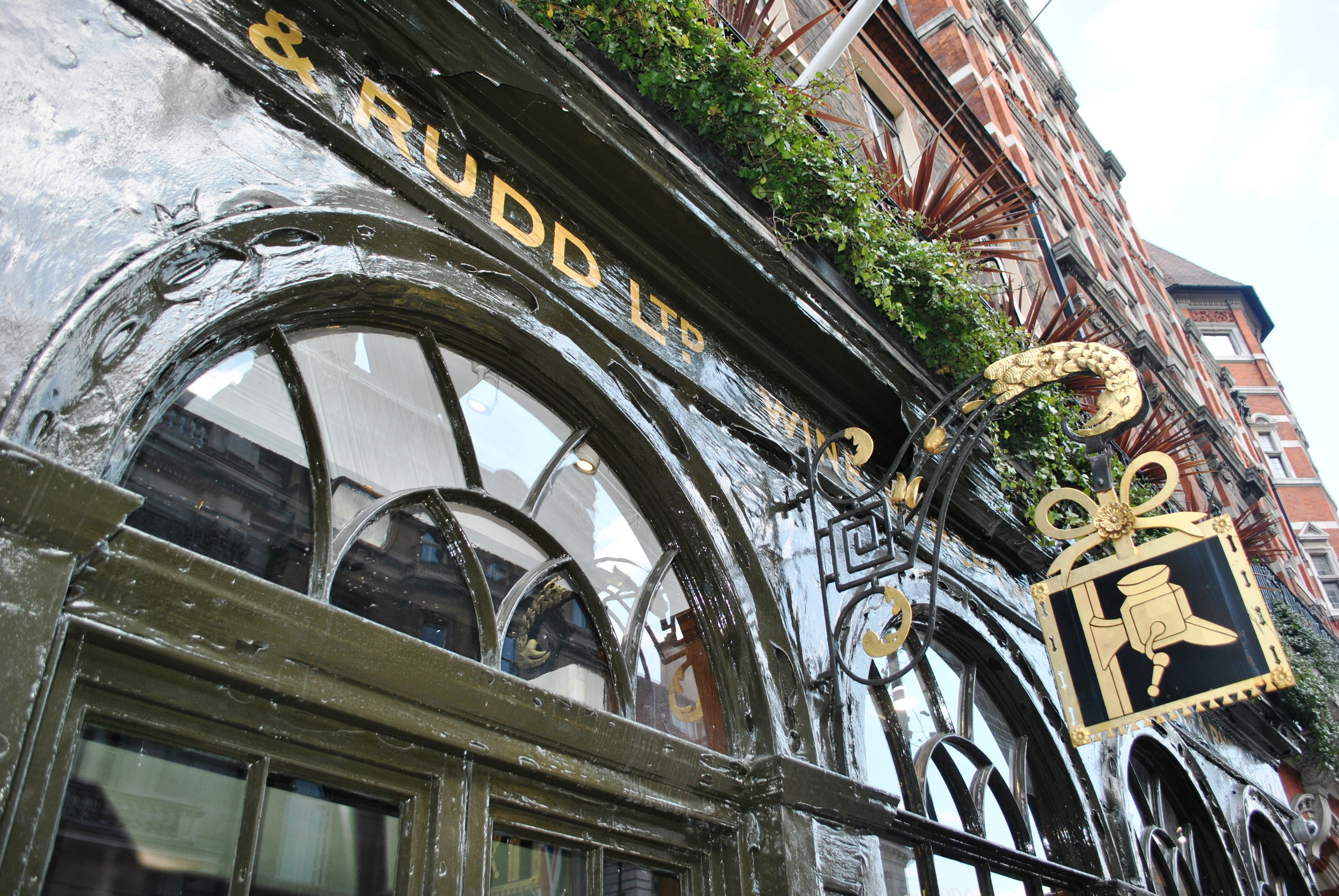
- Type: Private
- Genre: Wine merchant
- Founded: 1698
- Founder: The Widow Bourne (full name unknown)
- Headquarters: London, England, UK
- Key people: Emma Fox (CEO), Lizzy Rudd (Chair of the board)
- Products: Wine, spirits
- Services: wines, spirits, corporate hospitality, private dining, wine storage, wholesale
- Website: www.bbr.com

Berry Bros. & Rudd (BBR) is a family-run British wine and spirits merchant founded in London, England, in 1698 as a small coffee shop. Although now an international business with six offices worldwide, they did not become wine merchants until the late 18th century.

In addition to wines such as en primeur from places like Bordeaux, Burgundy, the Rhône and Italy, the company offers spirits and wines under its own-label range, Berry Bros. & Rudd's Own Selection.

Other services it offers include wine investment, wine storage, wine tastings, events, and educational courses.

== History ==
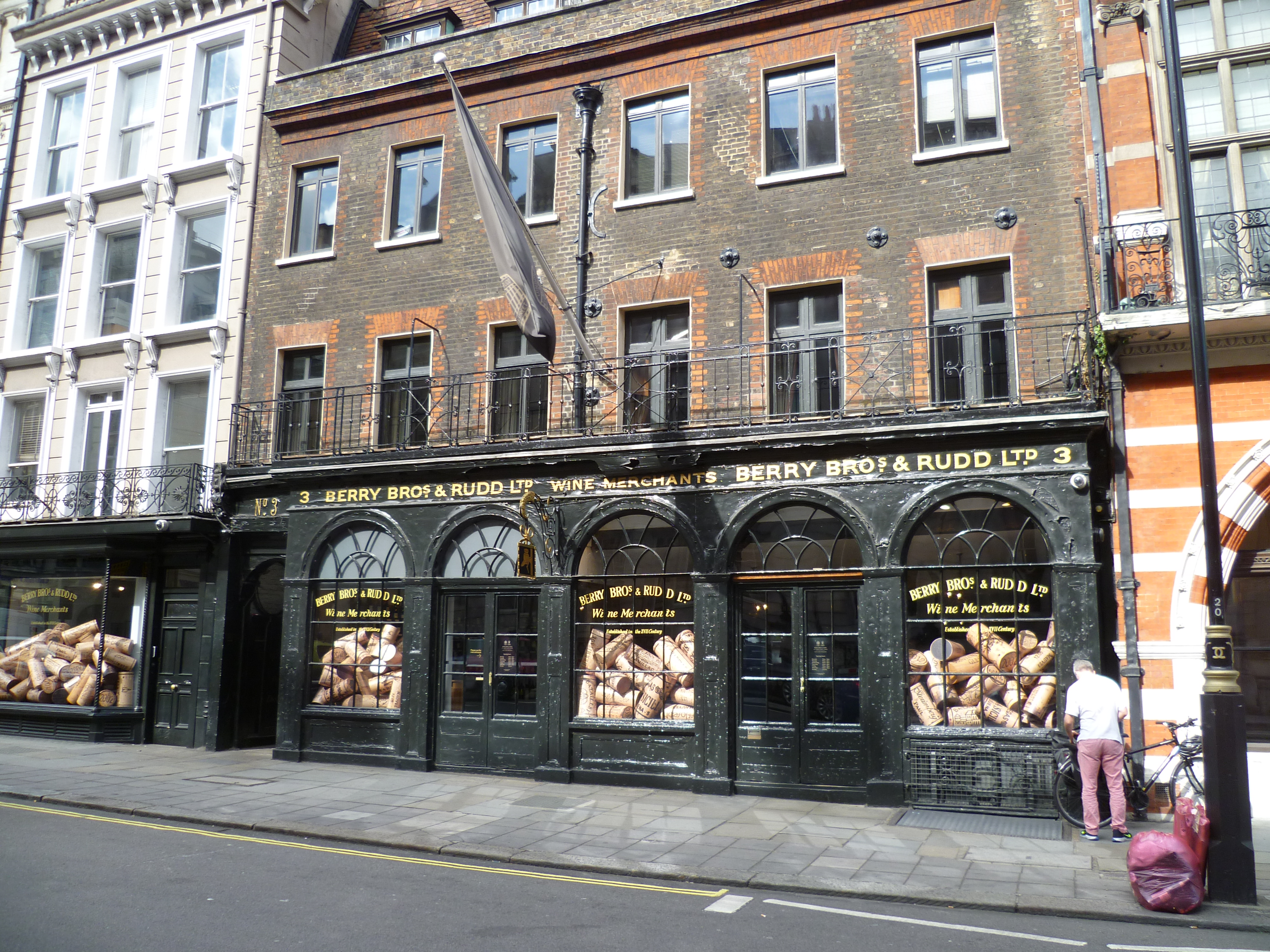
No.3 St James's Street

Berry Bros. & Rudd was founded by the Widow Bourne in 1698 at 3 St. James's Street, London, which today is a Grade II* listed building still used as the company's headquarters. No.3, as it is known, contained Berry Bros. & Rudd's main retail premises until mid-2017, when these moved around the corner to a purpose-built shop at 63 Pall Mall. The company has a discounted store next to its main warehouse in Basingstoke, Hampshire, and additional offices in Battersea as well as overseas in Japan, Hong Kong and Singapore.

The company started out selling coffee, and then diversified into cocoa, tea, snuff, spices, and other exotic goods, quickly becoming one of London's most fashionable grocers. Its West End location and close proximity to St James's Palace also contributed to its growing popularity. In 1903 they formulated a ginger liqueur to revivify Edward VII from cold car journeys, still purveyed as The King's Ginger.

During the years, it has counted many famous customers among its clientele including: Lord Byron, William Pitt the Younger, the Aga Khan, and Beau Brummell.

2017 saw the opening of the BBR retail store located around the corner from the original shop. The two locations are adjoined by a walk through hall, and the retail space is now standing at 62–63 Pall Mall, London.

The design of the new store was made by Mowat & Company. The project involved transforming the ground floor of the adjoining building and cellars on Pall Mall, transforming into a modern retail wine shop for Berry Bros. & Rudd — their first new London shop since the company’s founding in 1698.

All external and internal signage was made as a duplication of the original identity. The distinctive BBR marks were crafted by Nick Garrett NGS Signwriting and Pentagram design studio.

In 2020, Emma Fox became CEO, succeeding Lizzy Rudd, who had been serving as interim executive chair following Dan Jago’s departure in January 2019. Lizzy Rudd continues in her role as Chair of the Board. In May 2026, it was announced that Emma Fox would step down as chief executive, with Rob Symington and Emily Rae appointed as co‑chief executives.

In 2023, the company acquired a minority stake in the Cotswolds Distillery and acquired a 50% stake in Hambledon Vineyard in Hampshire, England.

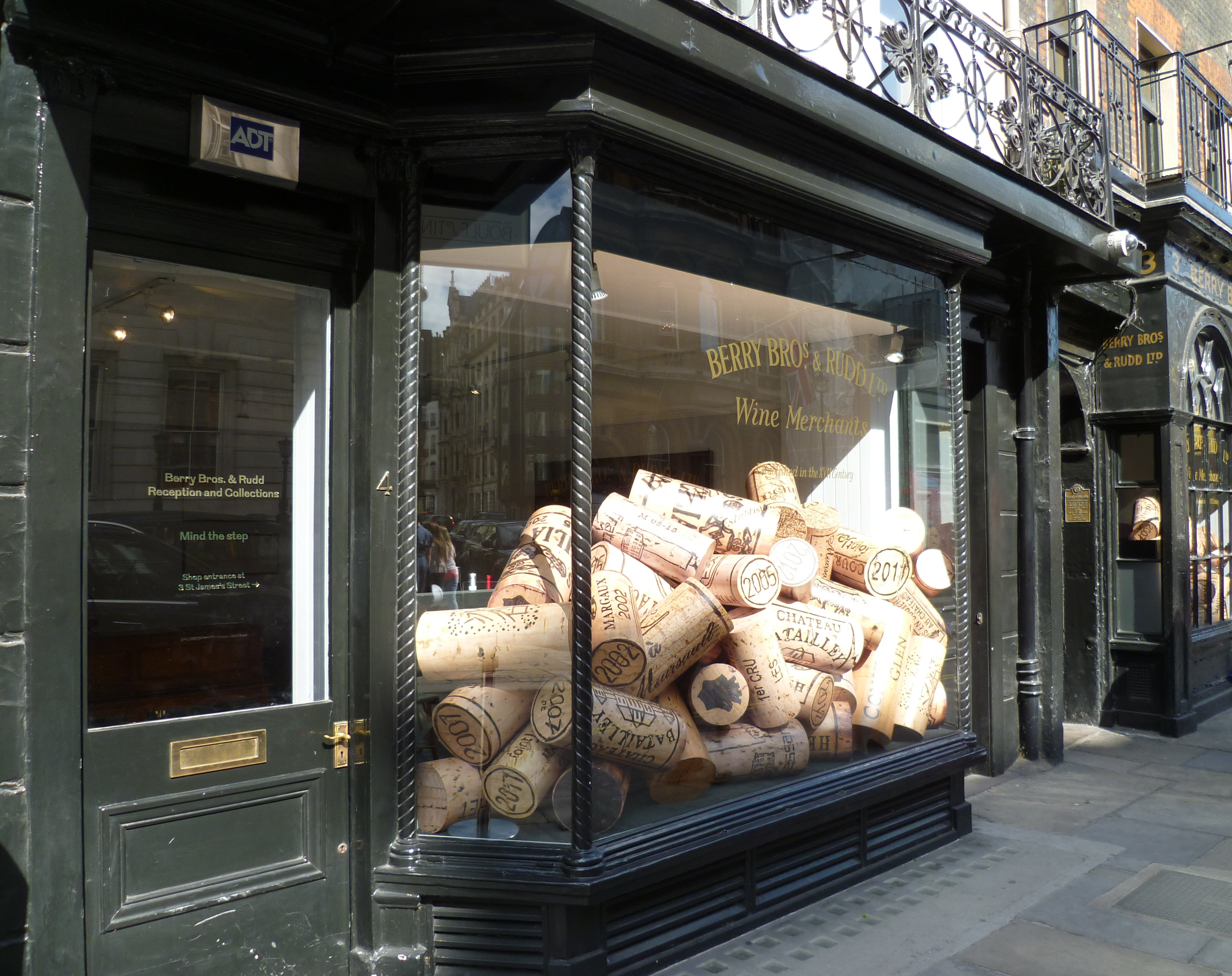
Window display at 4 St James's Street

== Royal warrants ==
Berry Bros. & Rudd has been the official wine supplier to the British royal family since the reign of King George III and received its first royal warrant of appointment in 1903 from King Edward VII. Queen Elizabeth II granted the company her royal warrant in 1952, while Charles, Prince of Wales (now King Charles III) granted it his in 1998.

== Basingstoke warehouse ==
In 1967, the company moved its bottling operation and warehouse to purpose-built facilities in Basingstoke, Hampshire. In spring 2014, it relaunched its warehouse shop on the site of the former bottling hall, the shop now sells bin-end and reduced price wines and spirits alongside a fine wine collection.

== Cutty Sark whisky ==
In 1923 Berry Bros. & Rudd launched Cutty Sark Scotch whisky. The whisky brand was owned by Robertson and Baxter which was controlled by the Robertson sisters led by Ethel Robertson in the 1950s. The whisky was still marketed by Berry Bros. & Rudd.

In 2010 the brand was sold to The Edrington Group; under the deal, Berry Bros. & Rudd acquired The Glenrothes single malt brand, which was then sold back to Edrington in 2017.

== Berry Bros. & Rudd's Broking Exchange (BBX) ==
Berry Bros. & Rudd was the first wine merchant to open an online shop, launching bbr.com in 1995. Today it also has an online wine trading platform called BBX (Berry Bros. & Rudd's Broking Exchange). It enables customers to sell and trade their own wines if they are stored in the company's bonded warehouses. Today BBX is the world's most extensive online fine wine trading platform.

== See also ==
- King's Ginger
