= Afinsa =

Spanish collectibles company

Afinsa was a company from Spain, which at one point was the world's third largest collectibles company, after Sotheby's and Christie's, and with its controlling stake in Escala Group operated in many European cities, the United States and Asia. Founded in 1980 by Albertino de Figueiredo, a Portuguese national living in Spain, the group is headquartered in Madrid and has offices in many other cities, including Barcelona, Vigo, Valladolid and Lisbon.

In 2006 police in Spain made several arrests amid accusations of operating a Ponzi fraud scheme. In July 2013, a Spanish court handed down indictments against 14 officers.

== Fraud allegations ==
In May 2006, police in Spain made several arrests, closed offices and confiscated material in connection with a large-scale suspected fraud operation involving two companies Afinsa Bienes Tangibles and Forum Filatélico and affecting the life savings of over 350,000 private investors in Spain. The offices of Afinsa in Madrid were searched by armed police and documents and computers were taken away from the buildings. Of the nine arrests made by police, four people were from Afinsa, including the founder Albertino de Figueiredo, and one of his sons, Carlos Figueiredo Escribá. The company published a note on its website reassuring its clients and employees that it was cooperating with authorities in order to prove its innocence.

The company has been accused of operating a Ponzi fraud scheme, using the money from new investors to pay the returns on previous investments. Many of the approximately 150,000 investors are pensioners for whom investing their savings in rare stamps appeared a more attractive option than placing them in a lower-return bank savings account.

Afinsa was not a financial institution. Contrary to equity investment, tangible investments are not protected by a mandatory warranty fund under Spanish law (available only to registered financial institutions, which allowed the victims of the earlier Banesto and Gescartera scandals to recover a small part of their assets). Such investment is overseen by the Consumption departments of the regional governments instead of the Comisión Nacional del Mercado de Valores. Customers of Afinsa affected by the situation have formed several associations, as have customers of Forum.

As the majority owner of NASDAQ traded company Escala Group (now Spectrum Group International), the scandal deeply affected its share price, which plummeted more than 85% in the days after the arrests, before recovering slightly. The company received a delisting notification from NASDAQ, effective on January 10, 2007.

In July 2013, a Spanish court handed down indictments against 14 officers of Afinsa and Escala.

== See also ==
- Philatelic investment
- Top 100 US Federal Contractors
