= Investment =

Set of actions with the intent of earning profit

Investment is traditionally defined as the "commitment of resources into something expected to gain value over time". If an investment involves money, then it can be defined as a "commitment of money to receive more money later". From a broader viewpoint, an investment can be defined as "to tailor the pattern of expenditure and receipt of resources to optimise the desirable patterns of these flows". When expenditures and receipts are defined in terms of money, then the net monetary receipt in a time period is termed cash flow, while money received in a series of several time periods is termed cash flow stream.

In finance, the purpose of investing is to generate a return on the invested asset. The return may consist of a capital gain (profit) or loss, realised if the investment is sold, unrealised capital appreciation (or depreciation) if yet unsold. It may also consist of periodic income such as dividends, interest, or rental income. The return may also include currency gains or losses due to changes in foreign currency exchange rates.

Investors generally expect higher returns from riskier investments. When a low-risk investment is made, the return is also generally low. Similarly, high risk comes with a chance of high losses. Investors, particularly novices, are often advised to diversify their portfolio. Diversification has the statistical effect of reducing overall risk.

== Types of financial investments ==
In modern economies, traditional investments include:

- Stocks – Business ownership, known as equity, in publicly traded companies
- Bonds – loans to governments and businesses traded on public markets
- Cash – holding a particular currency, whether in anticipation of spending or to take advantage of or hedge against changes in a currency exchange rate
- Real estate, which can be rented to provide ongoing income or resold if it increases in value

Alternative investments include:

- Private equity in businesses that are not publicly traded on a stock exchange, often involving venture capital funds, angel investors, or equity crowdfunding
- Other loans, including mortgages
- Commodities, such as precious metals like gold, agricultural products like potatoes, and energy deliveries like natural gas
- Collectables, including art, coins, vintage cars, postage stamps, and wine
- Carbon offsets and credits
- Digital entities like cryptocurrency and non-fungible tokens
- Hedge funds that use sophisticated techniques like:
  - Derivatives, the value of which is determined by a contract and is derived by calculation from the performance of some other sort of underlying investment; these include forwards, futures, options, swaps, collateralized debt obligations, credit default swaps, and Tax Receivable Agreements
  - Leveraged investing, which is the investment of borrowed money
  - Short selling, which typically uses leverage and derivatives to bet that the value of a stock will decline

== Investment and risk ==
An investor may bear a risk of loss of some or all of their capital invested. Investment differs from arbitrage, in which profit is generated without investing capital or bearing risk.

Savings bear the (normally remote) risk that the financial provider may default.

Foreign currency savings also bear foreign exchange risk: if the currency of a savings account differs from the account holder's home currency, then there is the risk that the exchange rate between the two currencies will move unfavourably so that the value of the savings account decreases, measured in the account holder's home currency.

Even investing in tangible assets like property has its risk. And similar to most risks, property buyers can seek to mitigate any potential risk by taking out mortgage and by borrowing at a lower loan to security ratio.

In contrast with savings, investments tend to carry more risk, in the form of both a wider variety of risk factors and a greater level of uncertainty.

Industry to industry volatility is more or less of a risk depending. In biotechnology, for example, investors look for big profits on companies that have small market capitalizations but can be worth hundreds of millions quite quickly. The risk is high because approximately 90% of biotechnology products researched do not make it to market due to regulations and the complex demands within pharmacology as the average prescription drug takes 10 years and US$2.5 billion worth of capital.

== History ==
Investments can be traced back to as early as 1700 BCE during the Code of Hammurabi. For the more modern type of investing that we have today, the 17th century is pointed to as the start. The shipping industry started to become very popular, and British, Dutch and French boats would travel to Asia, transporting goods. Since these travels were dangerous by waters, ship owners looked for investors to fund their travels. In return, the investors would redeem some of the profits when the boats returned.

The start of a stock exchange can be contributed to Amsterdam in 1602 known as the Amsterdam Stock Exchange. The first company to go public was Verenigde Oost-Indische Compagnie, and that founded the Amsterdam Stock Exchange. It became so large, the government had to facilitate trade. Amsterdam had an Exchange bank, used for making stock market transactions easier, and they had a merchant bank, used to for a regulated place for merchants to trade both being reason for Amsterdam being a world center of trade and capital.

The start of the stock market in America can be traced back to May 17, 1792, when the Buttonwood Agreement was signed, setting rules for how stocks can be traded, and aimed to ensure that deals were done between trusted parties. A few years prior, the Compromise of 1790, allowed Alexander Hamilton to use a policy to pay off Revolutionary War debts, using federally issued Bonds, making the first market exchange in America. In 1817, the stock market created an official organization and a board, the New York Stock and Exchange Board. They would meet two times a day and trade 30 different stocks and bonds. The stock exchange rapidly grew, and by the end of the Civil War in 1865, more than 300 stocks and bonds were traded.

== Investment strategies ==
=== Value investing ===
A value investor buys assets that they believe to be undervalued (and sells overvalued ones). To identify undervalued securities, a value investor uses analysis of the financial reports of the issuer to evaluate the security. Value investors employ accounting ratios, such as earnings per share and sales growth, to identify securities trading at prices below their worth.

Warren Buffett and Benjamin Graham are notable examples of value investors. Graham and Dodd's seminal work, Security Analysis, was written in the wake of the Wall Street Crash of 1929.

The price to earnings ratio (P/E), or earnings multiple, is a particularly significant and recognized fundamental ratio, with a function of dividing the share price of the stock, by its earnings per share. This will provide the value representing the sum investors are prepared to expend for each dollar of company earnings. This ratio is an important aspect, due to its capacity as measurement for the comparison of valuations of various companies. A stock with a lower P/E ratio will cost less per share than one with a higher P/E, taking into account the same level of financial performance; therefore, it essentially means a low P/E is the preferred option.

An instance in which the price to earnings ratio has a lesser significance is when companies in different industries are compared. For example, although it is reasonable for a telecommunications stock to show a P/E in the low teens, in the case of hi-tech stock, a P/E in the 40s range is not unusual. When making comparisons, the P/E ratio can give you a refined view of a particular stock valuation.

For investors paying for each dollar of a company's earnings, the P/E ratio is a significant indicator, but the price-to-book ratio (P/B) is also a reliable indication of how much investors are willing to spend on each dollar of company assets. In the process of the P/B ratio, the share price of a stock is divided by its net assets; any intangibles, such as goodwill, are not taken into account. It is a crucial factor of the price-to-book ratio, due to it indicating the actual payment for tangible assets and not the more difficult valuation of intangibles. Accordingly, the P/B could be considered a comparatively conservative metric.

=== Growth investing ===
Growth investors seek investments they believe are likely to have higher earnings or greater value in the future. To identify such stocks, growth investors often evaluate measures of current stock value as well as predictions of future financial performance. Growth investors seek profits through capital appreciation – the gains earned when a stock is sold at a higher price than what it was purchased for. The price-to-earnings (P/E) multiple is also used for this type of investment; growth stock are likely to have a P/E higher than others in its industry. According to Investopedia author Troy Segal and U.S. Department of State Fulbright fintech research awardee Julius Mansa, growth investing is best suited for investors who prefer relatively shorter investment horizons, higher risks, and are not seeking immediate cash flow through dividends.

Some investors attribute the introduction of the growth investing strategy to investment banker Thomas Rowe Price Jr., who tested and popularized the method in 1950 by introducing his mutual fund, the T. Rowe Price Growth Stock Fund. Price asserted that investors could reap high returns by "investing in companies that are well-managed in fertile fields."

A new form of investing that seems to have caught the attention of investors is Venture Capital. Venture Capital is independently managed dedicated pools of capital that focus on equity or equity-linked investments in privately held, high growth companies.

=== Momentum investing ===
Momentum investors generally seek to buy stocks that are currently experiencing a short-term uptrend, and they usually sell them once this momentum starts to decrease. Stocks or securities purchased for momentum investing are often characterized by demonstrating consistently high returns for the past three to twelve months. However, in a bear market, momentum investing also involves short-selling securities of stocks that are experiencing a downward trend, because it is believed that these stocks will continue to decrease in value. Essentially, momentum investing generally relies on the principle that a consistently up-trending stock will continue to grow, while a consistently down-trending stock will continue to fall.

Economists and financial analysts have not reached a consensus on the effectiveness of using the momentum investing strategy. Rather than evaluating a company's operational performance, momentum investors instead utilize trend lines, moving averages, and the Average Directional Index (ADX) to determine the existence and strength of trends.

=== Dollar cost averaging ===
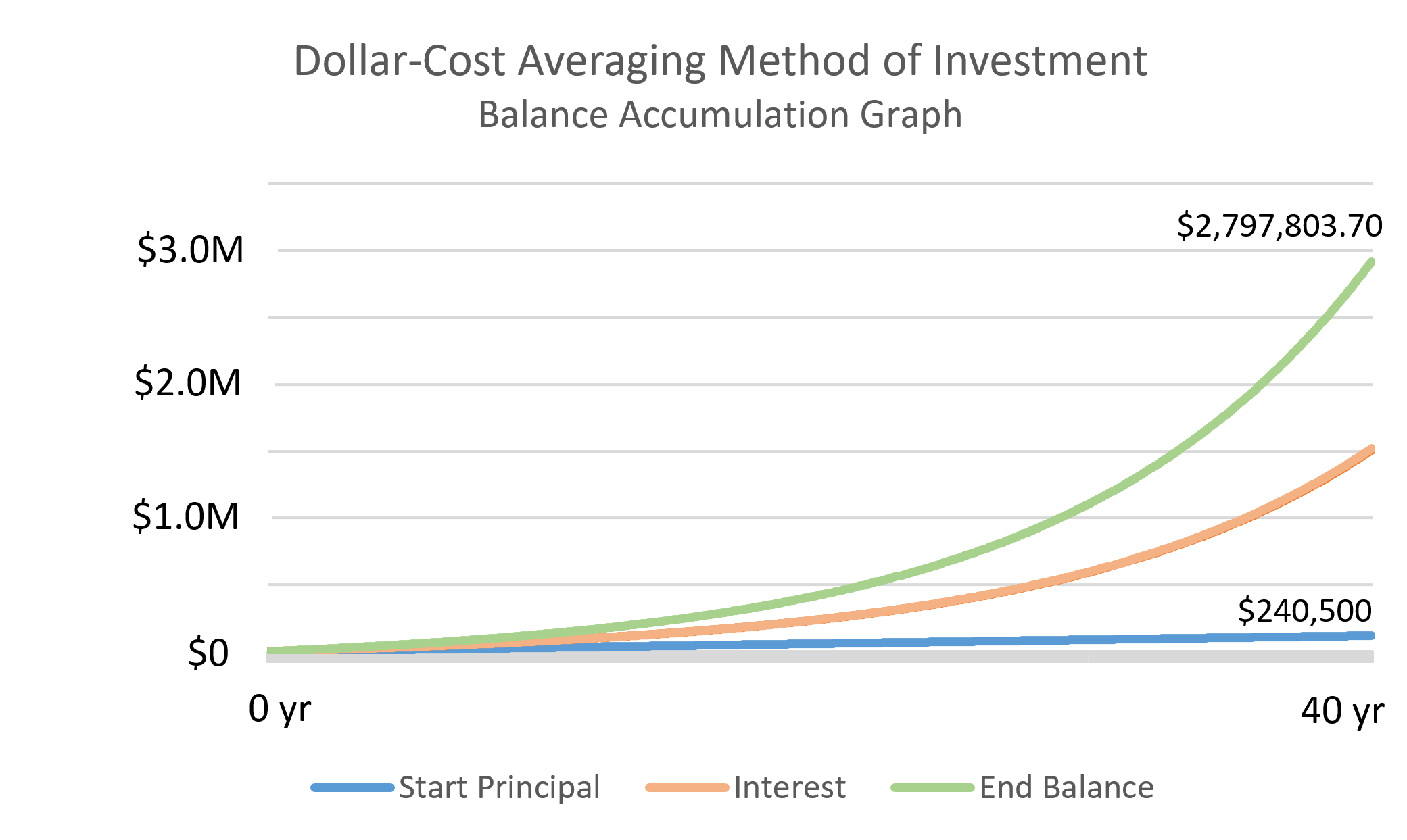
Dollar cost averaging: If an individual invested $500 per month into the stock market for 40 years at a 10% annual return rate, they would have an ending balance of over $2.5 million.

Dollar cost averaging (DCA), also known in the UK as pound-cost averaging, is the process of consistently investing a certain amount of money across regular increments of time, and the method can be used in conjunction with value investing, growth investing, momentum investing, or other strategies. For example, an investor who practices dollar-cost averaging could choose to invest $200 a month for the next 3 years, regardless of the share price of their preferred stock(s), mutual funds, or exchange-traded funds.

Many investors believe that dollar-cost averaging helps minimize short-term volatility by spreading risk out across time intervals and avoiding market timing. Research also shows that DCA can help reduce the total average cost per share in an investment because the method enables the purchase of more shares when their price is lower, and less shares when the price is higher. However, dollar-cost averaging is also generally characterized by more brokerage fees, which could decrease an investor's overall returns.

The term "dollar-cost averaging" is believed to have first been coined in 1949 by economist and author Benjamin Graham in his book, The Intelligent Investor. Graham asserted that investors that use DCA are "likely to end up with a satisfactory overall price for all [their] holdings."

=== Micro-investing ===
Micro-investing is a type of investment strategy that is designed to make investing regular, accessible and affordable, especially for those who may not have a lot of money to invest or who are new to investing.

== Intermediaries and collective investments ==
Investments are often made indirectly through intermediary financial institutions. These intermediaries include pension funds, banks, and insurance companies. They may pool money received from a number of individual end investors into funds such as investment trusts, unit trusts, and SICAVs to make large-scale investments. Each individual investor holds an indirect or direct claim on the assets purchased, subject to charges levied by the intermediary, which may be large and varied.

Approaches to investment sometimes referred to in marketing of collective investments include dollar cost averaging and market timing.

== Investment valuation ==
Free cash flow measures the cash a company generates which is available to its debt and equity investors, after allowing for reinvestment in working capital and capital expenditure. It is often used by investors as a way of measuring profitability of the company. High and rising free cash flow, therefore, tend to make a company more attractive to investors. Free cash flow can be attractive to investors because having high free cash flow can be a good indicator for high dividend or interest payments.

The debt-to-equity ratio is an indicator of capital structure. Debt-to-equity ratio measures how much debt is used to finance a company, compared to equity. A high debt-to-equity ratio means that a company relies more on debt to finance operations, and is much riskier to investors. A high proportion of debt, reflected in a high debt-to-equity ratio, tends to make a company's earnings, free cash flow, and ultimately the returns to its investors, riskier or volatile. Investors compare a company's debt-to-equity ratio with those of other companies in the same industry, and examine trends in debt-to-equity ratios and free cashflow.

Earnings per share (EPS) is another way to evaluate a stock and its profitability. Earnings per share is measured by dividing the net income of a company by the total number of outstanding shares. A higher earnings per share is attractive to investors because it typically means the company is more profitable. EPS shows how much money a company makes for each share of its stocks.

== See also ==
- Capital accumulation
- Capital gains tax
- Climate-related asset stranding
- Diversification (finance)
- Divestment
- EBITDA
- Foreign direct investment
- Fundamental analysis
- Legal Alpha
- List of countries by gross fixed investment as percentage of GDP
- List of economics topics
- Market sentiment
- Mortgage investment corporation
- Rate of return
- Socially responsible investing
- Specialized investment fund
- Time value of money
- Time-weighted return
