= Liquid alternative investment =

Strategy offering hedge-fund-like exposures through liquid, publicly tradable vehicles

Liquid alternatives are alternative investment strategies that are available through alternative investment vehicles such as mutual funds, ETFs, and closed-end funds that provide daily liquidity. Liquid alts are also known as 40 Act funds because they were created by the U.S. Congress in 1940.

== Growth of liquid alternative strategies ==
Launches of liquid alts funds tripled from 2009 to 2013.

Major drivers for the growth in liquid alternative funds include:

- "The 2008 crisis has fundamentally changed investors’ priorities from a main emphasis on investment returns and alpha generation to an emphasis on diversification and downside protection (or principal preservation), especially in the case of a steep market downdraft"
- "investors have had the investment wind in their backs for decades with strong equity markets backed by strong economic growth and appreciating bond markets. They are now faced with extremely low interest rates and slow and uncertain economic growth. The result has been a rethinking of the traditional 60/40 stock/bond portfolio that has been the mainstay of investments"
- "Complicating the issue is the changes in the investment management industry in terms of organization and scale of the companies, the host of new products, and the changes in the investment paradigm that has governed the industry for the past four decades. Individuals and institutions have been struggling to develop portfolio strategies to meet their changing needs. The role of alternative investments in investor portfolios has been an important part of this development".

== Retail liquid alternatives ==
Retail investors interested in liquid alts are looking for growth, but want more liquidity than hedge funds provide. In a Goldman Sachs report, the growth of liquid alternatives is "reminiscent of early-stage ETF growth".

== Consequences ==
"The rapid growth of Liquid Alternative Investments has had a profound effect on all aspects of the investment management industry, affecting investors, investment managers, and asset management companies around the world. It has blurred the distinction between formerly segregated parts of the industry—notably hedge funds and mutual funds—and led to competition between the various groups. It has provided investors—both retail and institutional–with a new tool for their portfolios, although many are not certain of its benefits. Investment advisors, meanwhile, have been hard at work learning about this new area and how to incorporate it into their asset management and advisory activities. Most recently, the growth of the industry has piqued the interest of the Securities and Exchange Commission (SEC) which has issued in early 2014 announced it would conduct a regulatory sweep of the largest of these alternative investments.

== History ==
Liquid alternatives became popular in the late 2000s, growing from $124 billion in assets under management 2010 to $310 billion in 2014. However, in 2015 only $85 million was added, with 31 closed funds.

Liquid alternatives had poor performance in 2010s, with only a 1.66% average annualized gain after charging relatively high fees. While 453 have been created since 2009, 153 continued to exist in 2021.
