= Byron Reed Collection =

Collection of rare materials housed at the Durham Museum in Omaha

Coordinates: 41.2515°N 95.9283°W

The Byron Reed Collection features rare books, manuscripts, autographs and coins that are located at the Durham Museum in Omaha, Nebraska, United States. According to experts, "Byron Reed was one of the greatest collectors of the 19th century," with a reputation as a numismatist that is "largely unrecognized." Reed began collecting in the 1870s, continuing until he died, in 1891.

== About ==
In the late 19th century, Omaha real estate agent Byron Reed gradually put together a stunning collection of coins, documents, books, maps, and other items of great historical importance. Upon his death in 1891, Reed gave his collection to the city of Omaha and it is now housed at The Durham Museum. Significant portions of Reed's collection are on exhibit; of special interest is the "Treasures Cabinet," containing Reed's specimen of the 1804 Dollar.

A corresponding member of the American Numismatic and Archaeological Society of New York, Byron Reed was a pioneer real estate businessman who was regarded as an "industrious" collector. His coin collection is still thought to be one of the most complete in the United States, and includes numerous Jewish and Roman coins, as well as an almost perfect compilation of coinage of the U.S. from colonial times through to the 1890s. In 1999 the Reed 1804 Dollar was labeled the "King of American Coins."

== Highlights ==
Reed's personal library includes numerous documents relevant to the founding of Omaha, as well as religious texts from the Middle Ages. His collection is considered to include one of the largest numismatic libraries in the Midwestern United States. According to many experts, the library is probably the last one formed in the 19th century to remain intact.

== Display ==
After his death, the collection was willed to the City of Omaha and the Omaha Public Library. Today the Byron Reed Collection is in the care of, and on display at, the Durham Western Heritage Museum (now the Durham Museum) in Omaha. According to Larry Wilson, a historian and numismatic researcher for the Independent Coin Grading Service:

The exhibit is an environmental museum where the visitors walk through a replication of the original Byron Reed Library. The coins are displayed in beautiful dark wooden cases that give the visitors the sense they are part of the exhibit. It gave me the feeling I was back in the 1880s sitting in Byron Reed's library examining his coins with him. The exhibit includes an abundance of historical information on Byron Reed and the times. I know visitors will be impressed with the quality of the exhibit and the magnificence of the coins displayed.

== Value ==
A recent assessment of the Byron Reed Collection valued the collection at $7,894,013. The collection includes 1,163 coins from the United States that are valued at $6,447,000. 693 coins from around the world are worth $95,000. There are 1,400 pieces of exonumia valued at $322,000. The 673 pieces of paper money is worth $54,000, and the 2,850 books and documents in the collection total $975,000.

In 1996, the Omaha City Council decided to sell portions of the Byron Reed Collection at auction. The sale, held at Christie's in New York City, was held October 8 and October 9, 1996. All of the 562 lots offered were sold, for a total of $6.1 million.
