= King's Ginger =

English liqueur

The King's Ginger
- Type: Liqueur
- Distributor: Berry Bros. & Rudd
- Origin: England
- Introduced: 1903
- Alcohol by volume: 29.9
- Proof (US): 52.4
- Flavour: Ginger
- Ingredients: Brandy, ginger, honey & lemon
- Variants: Neutral grain spirits, ginger, lemon oil, Glenrothes single malt scotch, and sugar

The King's Ginger is an English liqueur by Berry Bros. & Rudd. The liqueur was originally created for King Edward VII. After his death in 1910, it was commissioned exclusively for the royal family. In 2011, it was standardized and made available to the public in select countries.

== History ==
The King's Ginger was created in 1903 when King Edward VII's doctor commissioned Berry Bros. & Rudd to create a "fortifying beverage" to be served in King Edward's flask. King Edward's doctor was concerned about the King's constitution: the King was obese, suffered from various ailments, was elderly and tended to travel the countryside in his convertible and go hunting regardless of the weather conditions. The doctor hoped this beverage would help "stimulate and revivify His Majesty during morning rides."

King Edward enjoyed the beverage and drank it regularly, sharing it with his friends, particularly during hunting trips. It also became popular with the royal family, and when King Edward died in 1910 the family continued to commission hundreds of cases annually.

The King's Ginger was only sold to the royal family and aristocracy in bottles without labels by Berry Bros. & Rudd. The recipe changed frequently and sales averaged 250 cases annually. In the late 2000s, a British barman acquired a bottle of King's Ginger and visited Berry Bros. & Rudd to purchase a bottle. He complained that the recipe was inconsistent and asked that the company produce a public-facing version. Working on behalf of Berry Bros. & Rudd, a Dutch distiller created the King's Ginger, in 2011, to be sold in the United Kingdom, Australia, and New Zealand. It was made available in the United States in 2012.

In 2020, the King's Ginger underwent a significant reformulation. The ABV was reduced from 41% to 29.9%, while the intensity of the ginger flavour was increased. Production was also moved from Holland back to the UK, while the bottle was redesigned.

== Production ==
Today's distributed, 52 proof, King's Ginger comprises a neutral based grain spirit, ginger, lemon oil, Glenrothes single malt scotch, and sugar.

Food & Wine describes the King's Ginger as full of ginger notes and "earthy and spicy and unlike anything else."
