= Coin show =

Event where coins are displayed and traded

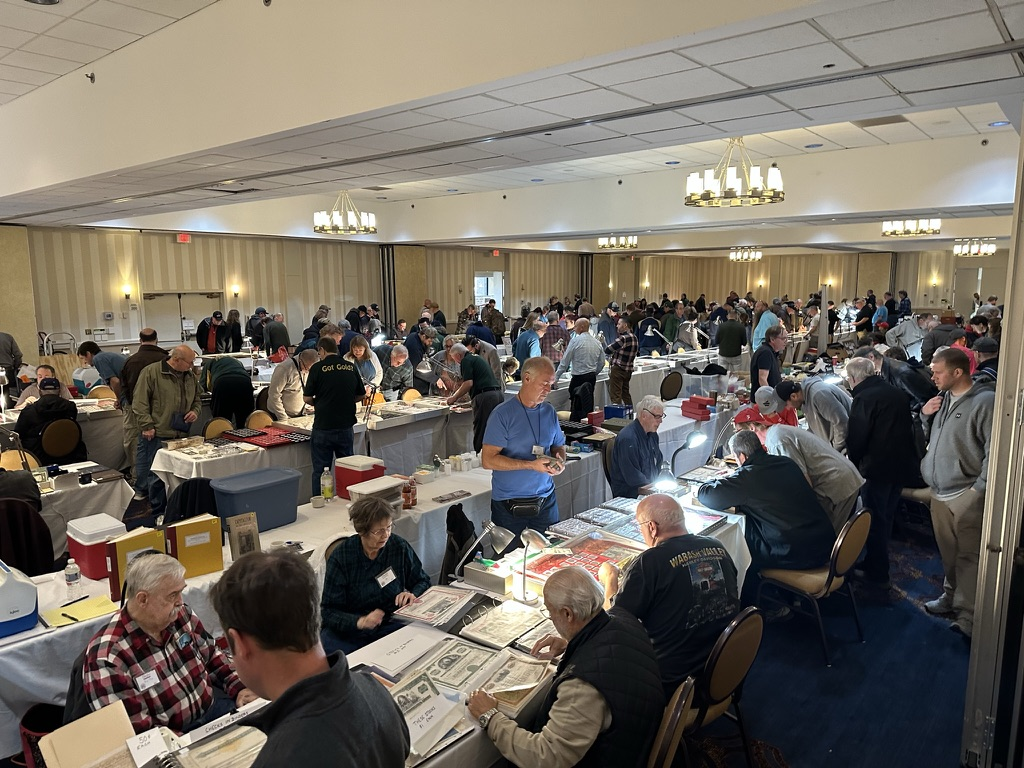
Coin show

Coin shows are events where coin collectors and coin dealers attend to buy, trade and sell coins. In addition to coins, dealers also sell paper money, books and tokens.

Like other hobby shows, a show hall is arranged with aisles and tables where coin sellers can display their coins. In cities across the United States there are thirty to fifty smaller local shows each weekend. The American Numismatic Association hosts national shows each year that may feature up to 1000 coin dealers.

A coin show is also an event that allows the public to sell coins to dealers. A show offers a coin collector the opportunity to meet multiple dealers and see a variety of coins, books, paper money and tokens. A coin show provides dealers and collectors a chance to see a great variety of coins to fill out coin sets.
