= Tangible investment =

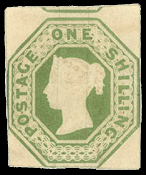
A British 1 shilling embossed stamp, typical of the type included in an investment portfolio of stamps.

A tangible investment is something physical that you can touch. It is an investment in a tangible, hard or real asset or personal property. This contrasts with financial investments such as stocks, bonds, mutual funds and other financial instruments.

Some assets are held purely for their ability to appreciate, such as collectibles, while others are held for the income they generate while they depreciate, such as equipment held for lease. Others exhibit a combination of properties, appreciating in market value while depreciating in book value, such as rental real estate. Timberland exhibits depletion of timber combined with appreciation of land. Other assets’ values fluctuate with supply and demand, such as commodities, which are liquid investments unlike most other tangible investments.

These various properties, together with the lack of correlation to traditional asset class values, make tangible investments a means of reducing overall investment risk through diversification.

== Types ==
All of the following are tangible investments:

- Businesses
- Real estate and land
- Infrastructure as an asset class (as opposed to traditional government-funded infrastructure)
- Commodities and natural resources such as industrial and precious metals and minerals, oil, agricultural commodities, fish, livestock and forestry
- Collectibles of all kinds, including:
  - Antiques and ancient artifacts
  - Fine art
  - Postage stamps (see philatelic investment)
  - Coins (see coin collecting) and banknotes
  - Autographs and historic documents
  - Memorabilia, such as political, celebrity, and sports memorabilia
  - Firearms and militaria
  - Trading cards
  - Jewelry and timepieces
  - Fine wines and spirits
  - Classic cars
  - Rare books
  - Musical instruments
  - Toys

== See also ==
- Tangible assets investment in accounting
