= Legal Alpha =

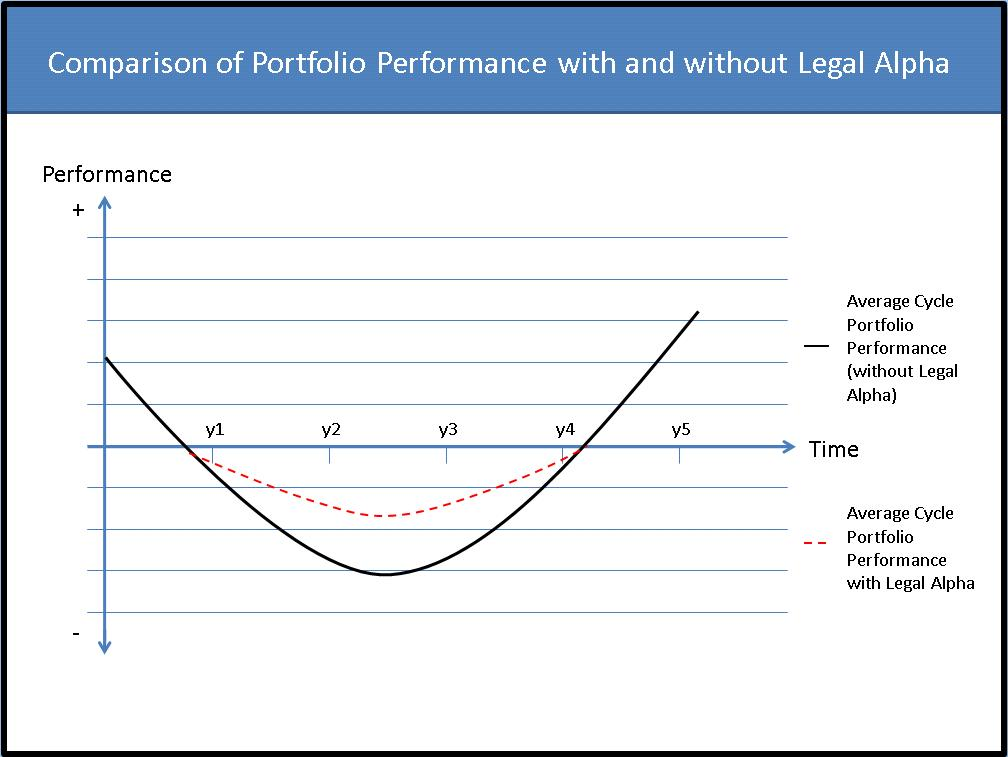
Comparison of portfolio performances

Legal Alpha is the extra performance generated in a specific, diversified investment portfolio by using opportunistic and selective legal activism to obtain compensation for under-performance related to legally relevant unforeseen and uncontrollable circumstances.

Traditionally, fund managers have been focusing on generating economic alpha by making effective investment decisions before the investment assets are allocated and deployed, followed by an active performance and benchmark related monitoring of the portfolio’s performance. Several methods and theories for the generation of alpha exist and new methods and theories are constantly developed and tested.

== Ways of generating Legal Alpha ==
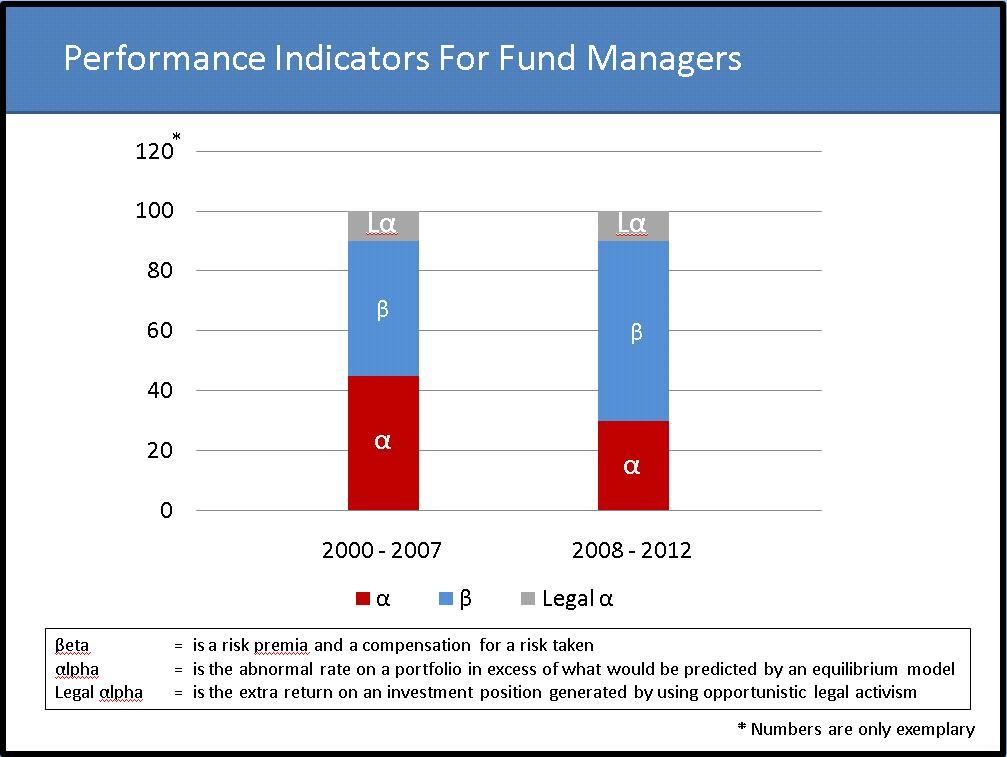
Fund Managers' Performance Indicators

Legal Alpha is generated by a pro-active but selective cooperation between the internal legal/portfolio management department and its external legal advisor of institutional investors or asset managers. These need to responsibly, and in the best interest of clients, consider all legal and economic options of enforcing claims attached to any assets managed. Hence, legal and economic positions must be analyzed together and enforcement/compensation option must be selectively used in combination with the appropriate jurisdiction and methods for the pursuit and recovery of losses in situations involving securities fraud, misrepresentation or other unforeseen and uncontrollable events causing losses in a portfolio investment due to the fault of an issuer. Options to increase a portfolio's performance by generating Legal Alpha include for example (a) active, coordinated proxy voting and shareholder activism to produce sustainable, long-term value of the target company, (b) the systematic pursuit and recovery of losses by participating in class-action settlement disbursements, (c) actively pursuing compensation claims in private or class actions, or (d) the selective pursuit of appraisal actions.

While Legal Alpha is never an absolute performance increase indicator, it is always a relative performance enhancer in situations where a portfolio was affected by external, uncontrollable circumstances such as fraud. However, a portfolio must not have suffered a negative performance in order to warrant the efforts to generate Legal Alpha.

== Fiduciary duties of institutional asset managers ==
Many jurisdictions around the world require a fund manager to act in the "best" or even "exclusive" interest of its clients, members (pension schemes) or investors, including the duty to preserve, protect but also to increase the funds entrusted to and managed by them. Having a pro-active portfolio monitoring system in place to generate Legal Alpha in the various manners available (see above) has become an industry standard among the world’s largest and respected asset managers and reflects the minimum duty of asset managers or other institutional investor who manage third-party assets. Hence, opportunistic activism, as described above, is increasingly occurring and customers demand a systematic approach to generating Legal Alpha.
