= Coin collecting =

Collection of minted legal tender

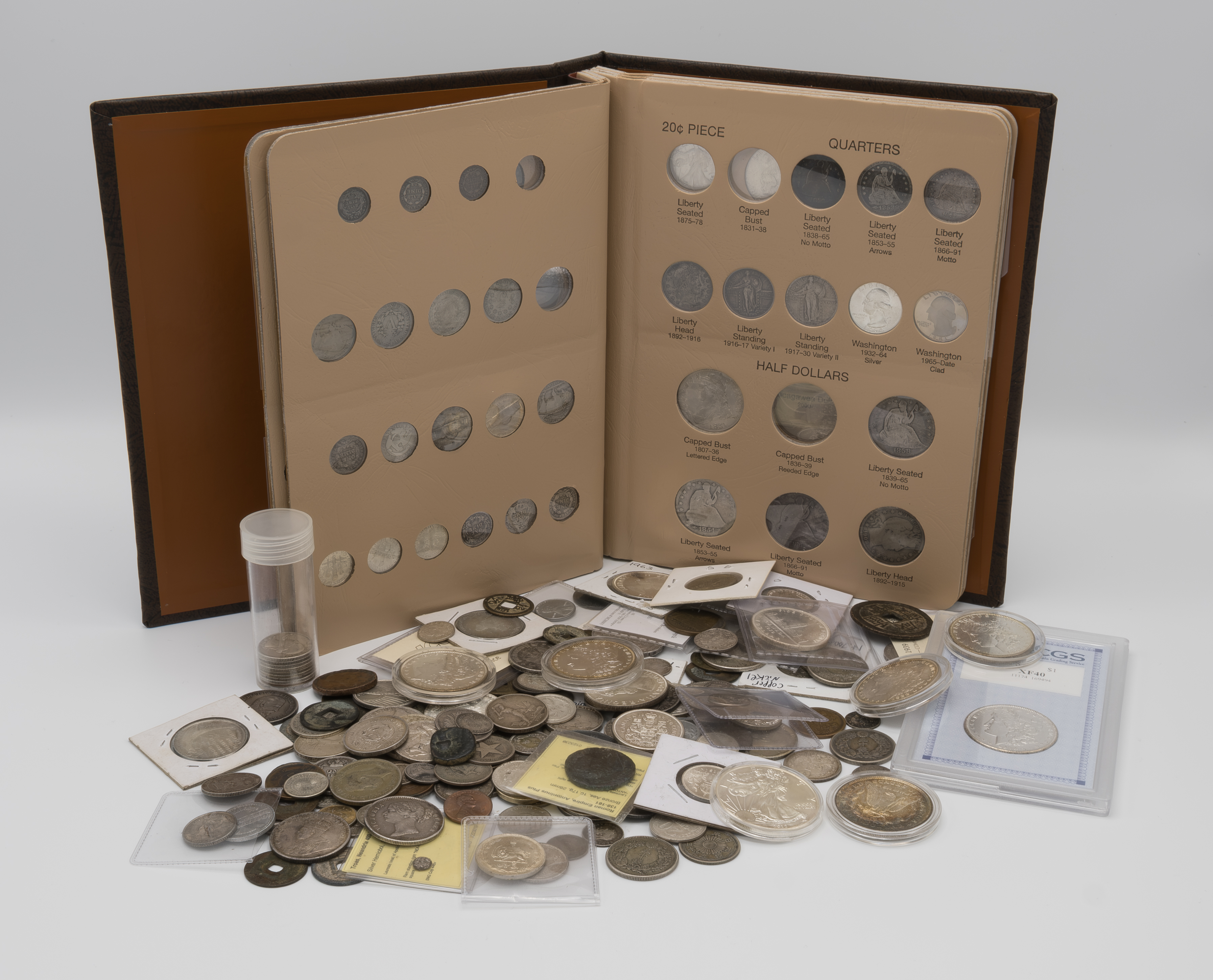
A coin collection, featuring coins loose and in various storage media.

Coin collecting is the collecting of coins or other forms of minted legal tender. Coins of interest to collectors include aesthetically pleasing, rare, and historically significant pieces. Collectors may be interested, for example, in complete sets of a particular design or denomination, coins that were in circulation for only a brief time, or coins with errors. Coin collecting can be differentiated from numismatics, in that the latter is the systematic study of currency as a whole, though the two disciplines are closely interlinked.

Many factors determine a coin's value including grade, rarity, and popularity. Commercial organizations offer grading services and will grade, authenticate, attribute, and encapsulate most coins.

== History ==
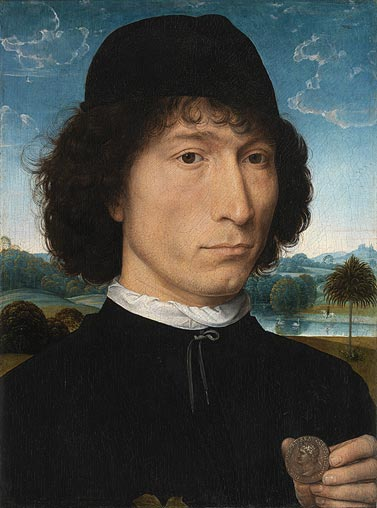
Portrait of a Man with a Roman Medal by Hans Memling, depicting a Renaissance collector with a sestertius of Nero

People have hoarded coins for their bullion value for as long as coins have been minted. However, the collection of coins for their artistic value was a later development. Evidence from the archaeological and historical record of Ancient Rome and medieval Mesopotamia indicates that coins were collected and catalogued by scholars and state treasuries. It also seems probable that individual citizens collected old, exotic or commemorative coins as an affordable, portable form of art. According to Suetonius in his De vita Caesarum (The Lives of the Twelve Caesars), written in the first century AD, the emperor Augustus sometimes presented old and exotic coins to friends and courtiers during festivals and other special occasions. While the literary sources are scarce, it's evident that collecting of ancient coins persisted in the Western World during the Middle Ages among rulers and high nobility.

Contemporary coin collecting and appreciation began around the fourteenth century. During the Renaissance, it became a fad among some members of the privileged classes, especially kings and queens. The Italian scholar and poet Petrarch is credited with being the pursuit's first and most famous aficionado. Following his lead, many European kings, princes, and other nobility kept collections of ancient coins. Some notable collectors were Pope Boniface VIII, Emperor Maximilian I of the Holy Roman Empire, Louis XIV of France, Ferdinand I of Spain and Holy Roman Emperor, Henry IV of France and Elector Joachim II of Brandenburg, who started the Berlin Coin Cabinet (German: Münzkabinett Berlin). Perhaps because only the very wealthy could afford the pursuit, in Renaissance times coin collecting became known as the "Hobby of Kings".

During the 17th and 18th centuries coin collecting remained a pursuit of the well-to-do. But rational, Enlightenment thinking led to a more systematic approach to accumulation and study. Numismatics as an academic discipline emerged in these centuries at the same time as a growing middle class, eager to prove their wealth and sophistication, began to collect coins. During the 19th and 20th centuries, coin collecting increased further in popularity. The market for coins expanded to include not only antique coins, but foreign or otherwise exotic currency. Coin shows, trade associations, and regulatory bodies emerged during these decades. The first international convention for coin collectors was held 15–18 August 1962, in Detroit, Michigan, and was sponsored by the American Numismatic Association and the Royal Canadian Numismatic Association. Attendance was estimated at 40,000. As one of the oldest and most popular world pastimes, coin collecting is now often referred to as the "King of Hobbies".

== Motivations ==
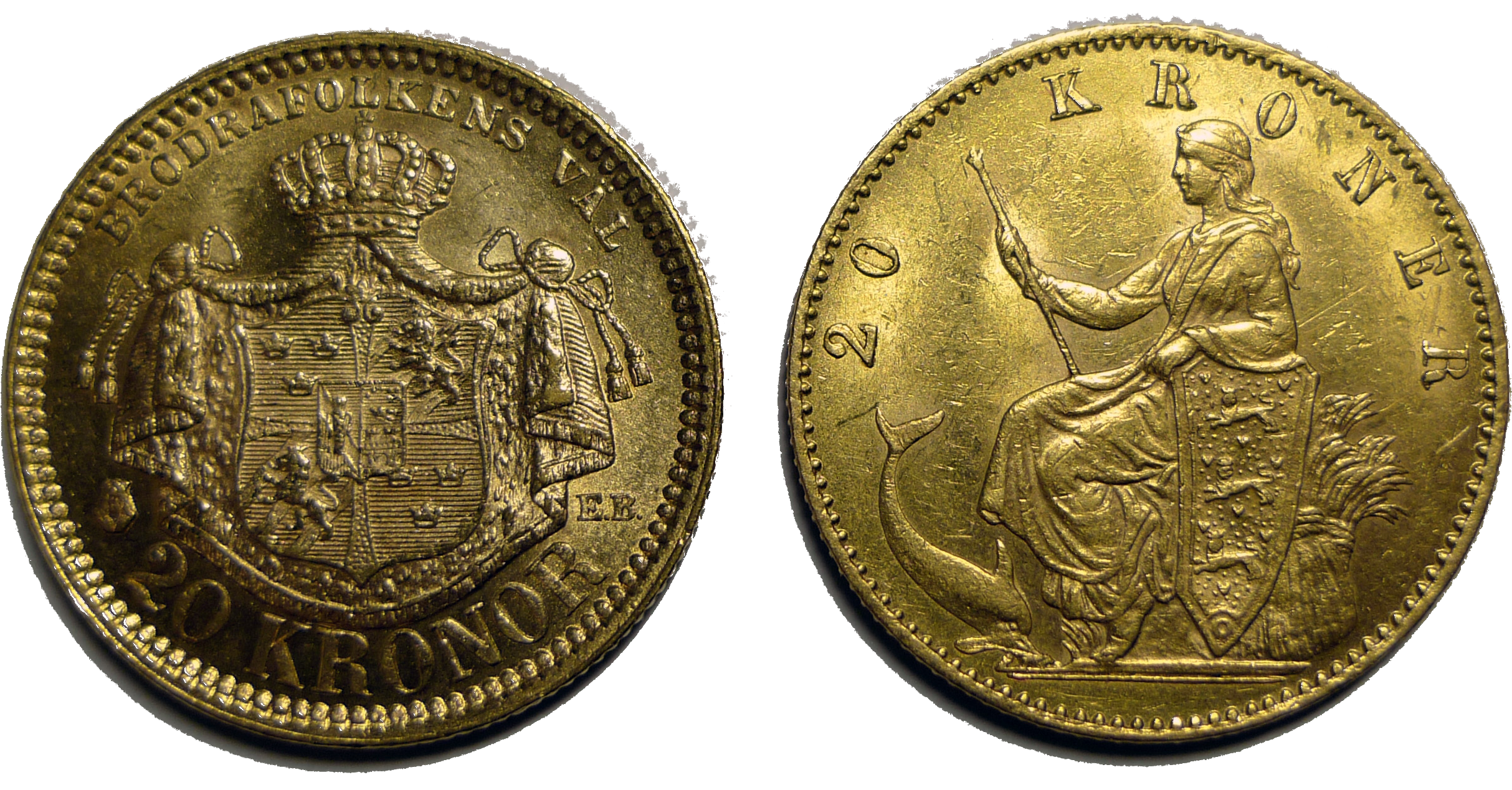
Two 20 kronor gold coins from the Scandinavian Monetary Union

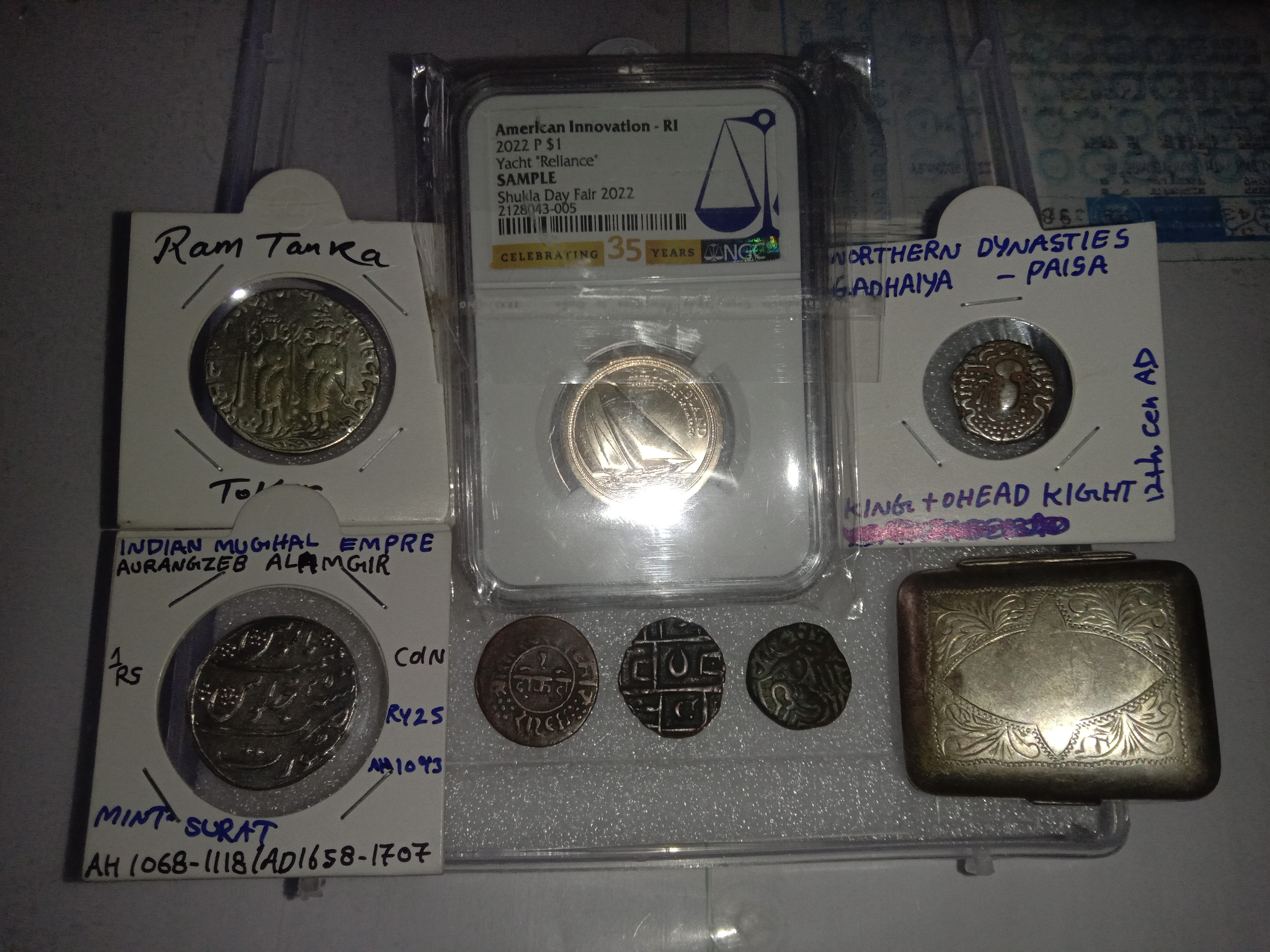
A collection of various collectible coins, including several Indian silver coins and an American Innovation dollar graded by NGC, alongside a vintage sterling silver case.

The motivations for collecting vary. Possibly the most common type of collectors are the hobbyists, who amass a collection primarily for the pleasure of it without the intention of making a profit.

Another frequent reason for purchasing coins is as an investment. As with stamps, precious metals, or other commodities, coin prices vary based on supply and demand. Prices drop for coins that are not in long-term demand, and increase along with a coin's perceived or intrinsic value. Investors buy with the expectation that the value of their purchase will increase over the long term. As with all types of investment, the principle of caveat emptor applies, and study is recommended before buying. Likewise, as with most collectibles, a coin collection does not produce income until it is sold, and may even incur costs (for example, the cost of safe deposit box storage) in the interim.

Some people collect coins for patriotic reasons and mints from various countries create coins specifically for patriotic collectors. One example of a patriotic coin was minted in 1813 by the United Provinces of the Rio de la Plata. One of the first pieces of legislation the new country enacted (after the revolution that freed it from Spanish rule) was to mint coins to replace the Spanish currency that had been in use. Another example is the U.S. 2022 Purple Heart Commemorative Coin Program.

== Collector types ==
Some coin collectors are generalists and accumulate examples from a broad variety of historical or geographically significant coins, but most collectors focus on a narrower, specialist interest. For example, some collectors focus on coins based on a common theme, such as coins from a country (often the collector's own), a coin each year from a series, or coins with a common mint mark.

There are also completists who seek an example of every type of coin within a certain category. One of the most famous of this type of collector is Louis E. Eliasberg, the only collector thus far to assemble a complete set of known coins of the United States. Foreign coin collecting is another type of collection that numismatists enjoy collecting.

Coin hoarders are similar to investors in the sense that they accumulate coins for potential long-term profit. However, they typically do not take into account aesthetic considerations. This is most common with coins whose metal value exceeds their spending value.

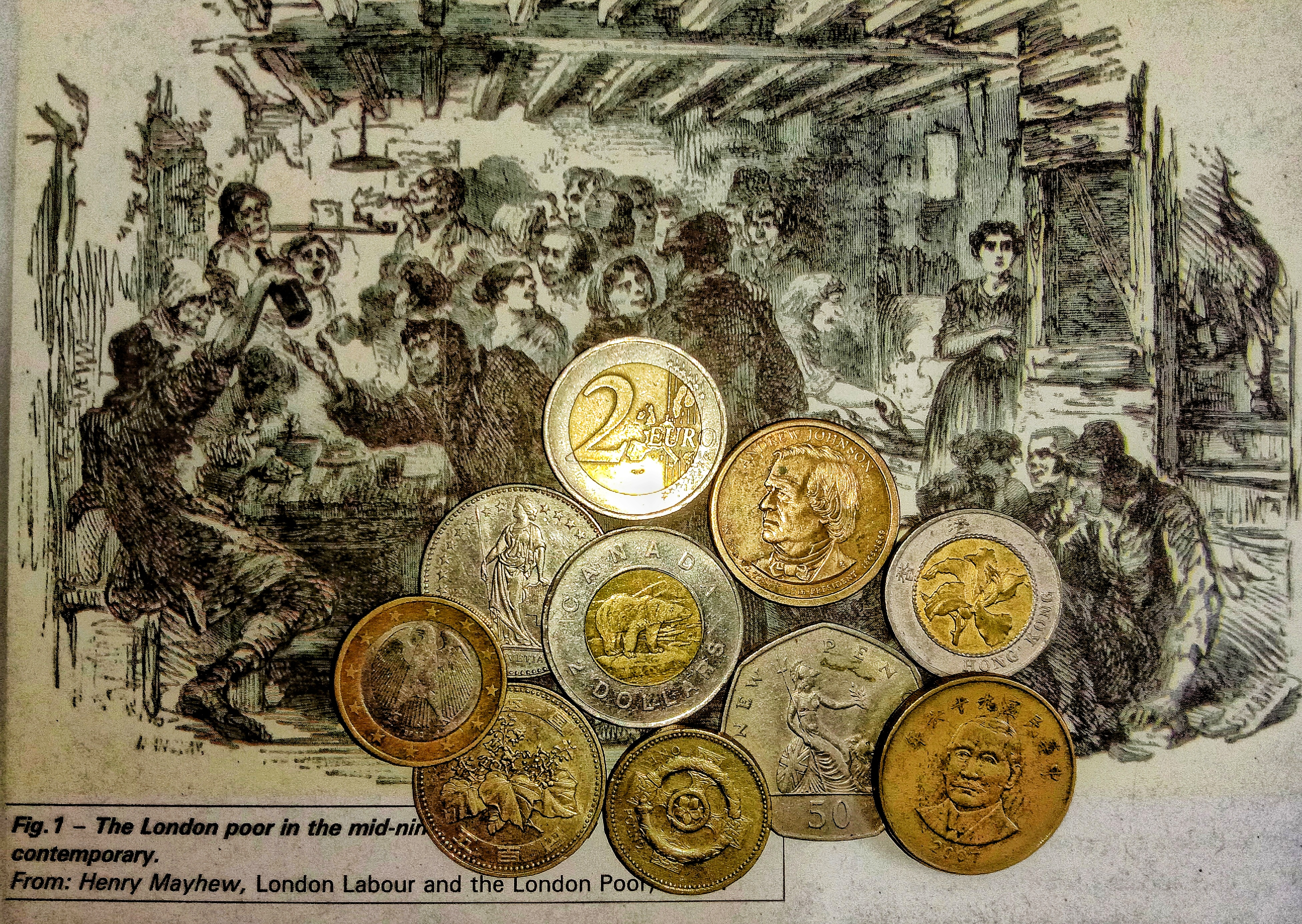
Modern-day coins are a popular and important part of coin collecting.

Speculators, be they amateurs or commercial buyers, may purchase coins in bulk or in small batches, and often act with the expectation of delayed profit. They may wish to take advantage of a spike in demand for a particular coin (for example, during the annual release of Canadian numismatic collectibles from the Royal Canadian Mint). The speculator might hope to buy the coin in large lots and sell at a profit within weeks or months. Speculators may also buy common circulation coins for their intrinsic metal value. Coins without collectible value may be melted down or distributed as bullion for commercial purposes. Typically they purchase coins that are composed of rare or precious metals, or coins that have a high purity of a specific metal.

A final type of collector is the inheritor, an accidental collector who acquires coins from another person as part of an inheritance. The inheritor type may not necessarily have an interest in or know anything about numismatics at the time of the acquisition.

== Grade and value ==
In coin collecting, the condition of a coin (its grade) is key to its value; a high-quality example with minimal wear is often worth many times more than a poor example. Collectors have created systems to describe the overall condition of coins. Any damage, such as wear or cleaning, can substantially decrease a coin's value.

By the mid 20th century, with the growing market for rare coins, the American Numismatic Association helps identify most coins in North America, numbering coins from 1 (poor) to 70 (mint state), and setting aside a separate category for proof coinage. This system is often shunned by coin experts in Europe and elsewhere, who prefer to use adjectival grades. Nevertheless, most grading systems use similar terminology, and values and remain mutually intelligible.

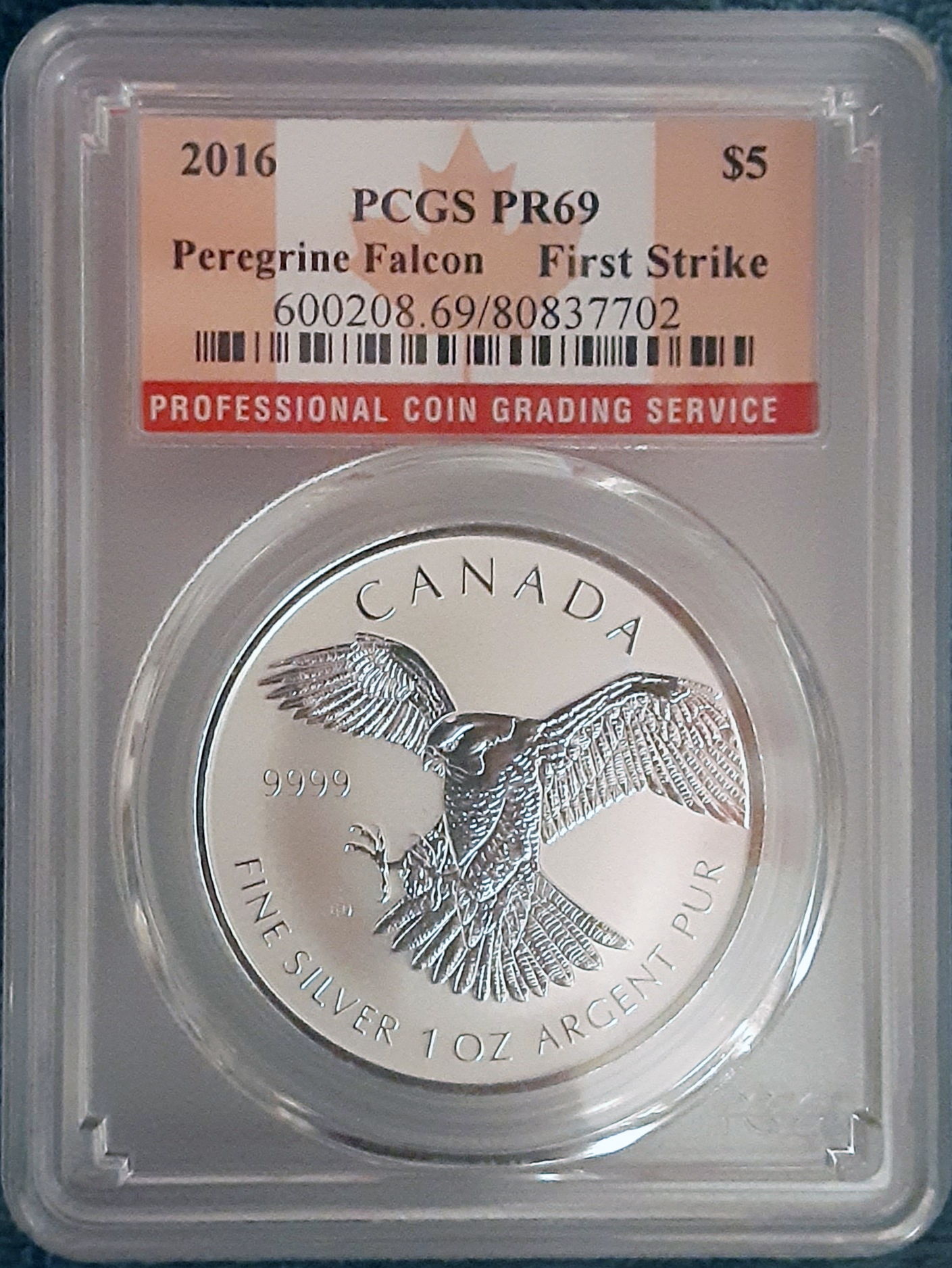
A PCGS graded silver coin

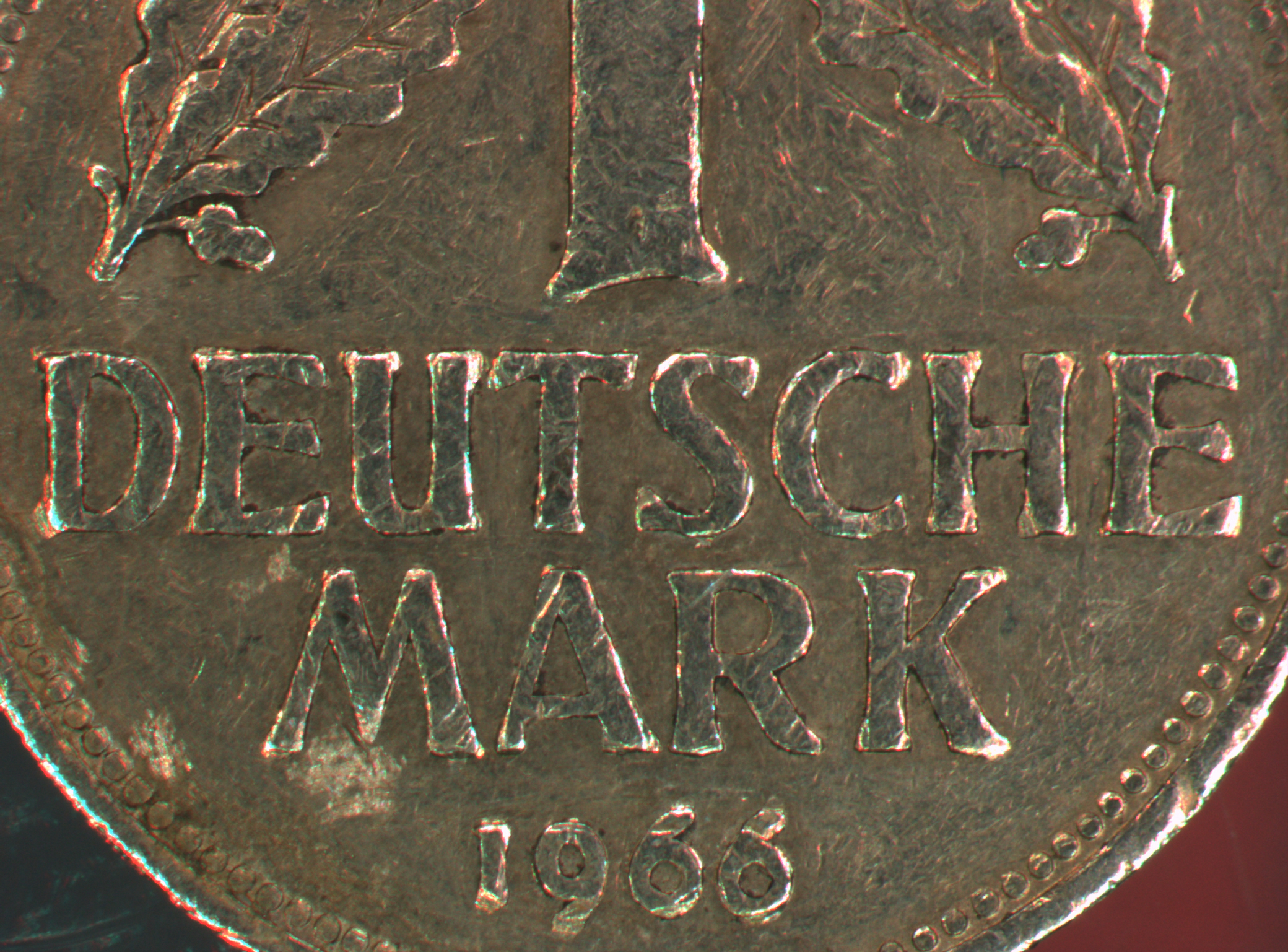
This Deutsche Mark coin shows blemishes and rim dents that would detract from its grade in appraisal. 3D red cyan glasses are recommended to view this image correctly.

== Certification services ==
Third-party grading (TPG), aka coin certification services, emerged in the 1980s with the goals of standardizing grading, exposing alterations, and eliminating counterfeits. For tiered fees, certification services grade, authenticate, attribute, and encapsulate coins in clear plastic holders.

Coin certification has greatly reduced the number of counterfeits and grossly over graded coins, and improved buyer confidence. Certification services can sometimes be controversial because grading is subjective; coins may be graded differently by different services or even upon resubmission to the same service. The numeric grade alone does not represent all of a coin's characteristics, such as toning, strike, brightness, color, luster, and attractiveness. Due to potentially large differences in value over slight differences in a coin's condition, some submitters will repeatedly resubmit a coin to a grading service in the hope of receiving a higher grade. Because fees are charged for certification, submitters must funnel money away from purchasing additional coins.

== Clubs ==
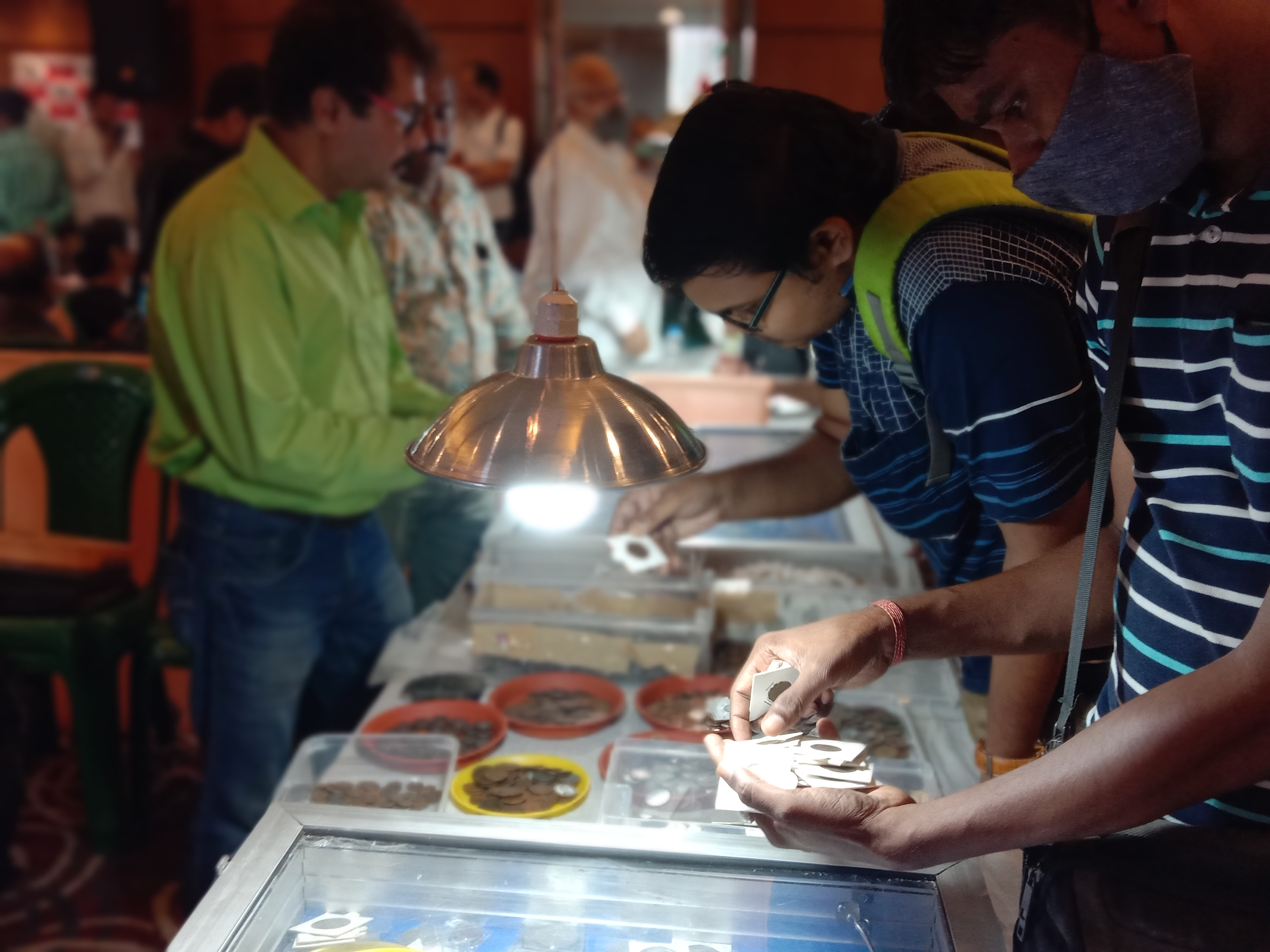
Coin collectors and enthusiasts enjoying the taste of numismatic items at an exhibition organized by the Numismatic Society of Calcutta, in Ballygunge, Kolkata, West Bengal.

Coin collector clubs offer a variety of benefits to members. They usually serve as a source of information and unification of people interested in coins. Collector clubs are popular both offline and online.

== See also ==
- Challenge coin
- Coin
- Coin catalog
- Coin grading
- Coin slab
- Commemorative coin
- Exonumia
- List of most expensive coins
- Numismatics
- Regular issue coinage
- Seigniorage

=== Examples ===
- Byron Reed Collection
- Collection at Ibn Sina Academy
