= Tax Receivable Agreement =

Type of legal contract

A Tax Receivable Agreement (TRA) is a legal contract where a company agrees to share the economic benefits from certain tax savings with another party. These tax savings may relate to deductions for depreciation, goodwill amortization, and net operating losses.

The first TRAs originated in the early 1990s; since then, TRAs have become increasingly prevalent. Prior to 2005, TRAs were used in less than 1% of initial public offerings (“IPOs”), but as of 2018, that number had increased to 8% of IPOs. This growth has created an ecosystem of leading accounting and law firms with specialized expertise in TRAs.

TRAs are now a common feature of IPOs structured as an Up-C. Up-C IPOs are designed to generate basis step-ups that allow a company to benefit from substantial tax deductions. TRAs are typically drafted to require that the newly public company share 85% of the tax benefits it receives from these basis step-ups with its pre-IPO owners.

TRAs often allow holders to transfer their rights under the TRA to outside investors, resulting in a growing market for secondary TRA investments. In the past, TRA holders may not have been able to easily monetize their TRA asset due to a lack of liquidity providers. However, a number of investment firms, like Parallaxes Capital, have since emerged to provide liquidity to TRA holders.
