= Traditional investments =

Investment in well-known assets and shares

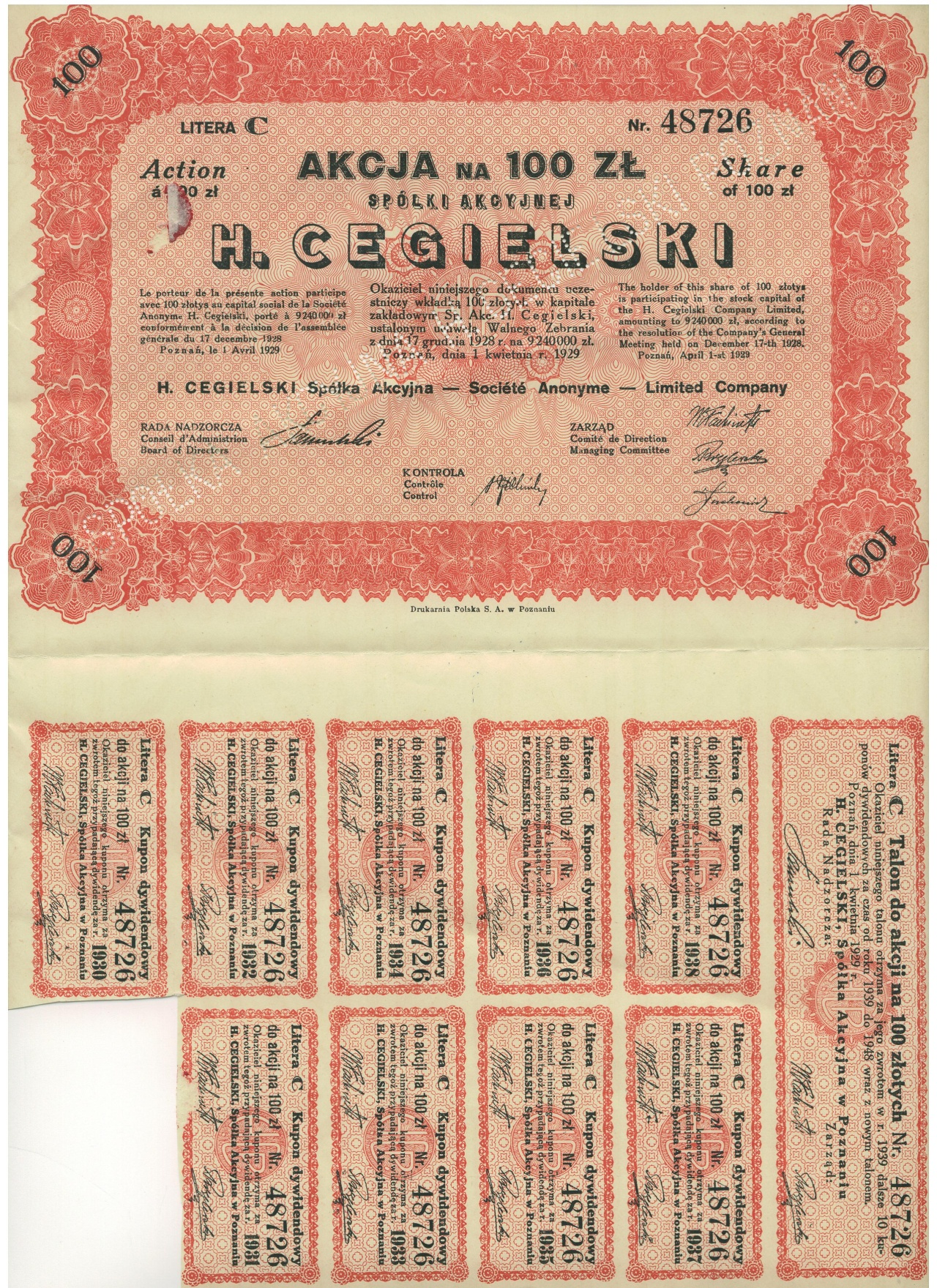
An old stock certificate from Poland with most of the coupons still attached.

In finance, the notion of traditional investments refers to putting money into well-known assets (such as bonds, cash, real estate, and equity shares) with the expectation of capital appreciation, dividends, and interest earnings. Traditional investments are to be contrasted with alternative investments.

== Bonds ==
Here the investor purchases debt issued by companies or governments which promises to pay an annual return until the debt is repaid. The value of the investment changes as the level of general interest rates fluctuates, causing the bond to become more or less valuable.

== Cash ==
In cash investing, money is typically invested in short-term, low-risk investment vehicles like certificates of deposit, money market funds, and high yield bank accounts.

== Real estate ==
In real estate, money is used to purchase property for the purpose of holding, reselling or leasing for income and there is an element of capital risk.

=== Residential real estate ===
Investment in residential real estate is the most common form of real estate investment measured by number of participants because it includes property purchased as a primary residence. In many cases the buyer does not have the full purchase price for a property and must borrow additional money from a bank, finance company or private lender.

=== Commercial real estate ===
Commercial real estate consists of apartments, office buildings, retail space, hotels, warehouses, and other commercial properties. Investors may purchase commercial property outright, with the help of a loan, or collectively through a real estate fund.

=== Real estate investment trusts ===
Investment in real estate investment trusts (REITs) is like investing in a pool of real estate that the company manages.

== Stocks and shares ==
This involves purchasing a share in the equity of a company with the expectation that the share price will increase. Purchasing a share in the company is the same as owning part of the company. Stock investing can come in the form of buying individual stocks, mutual funds, index funds and exchange-traded funds (ETFs).
