= Glenkinchie distillery =

Whisky distillery

Coordinates: 55°53′29.2″N 2°53′29.5″W

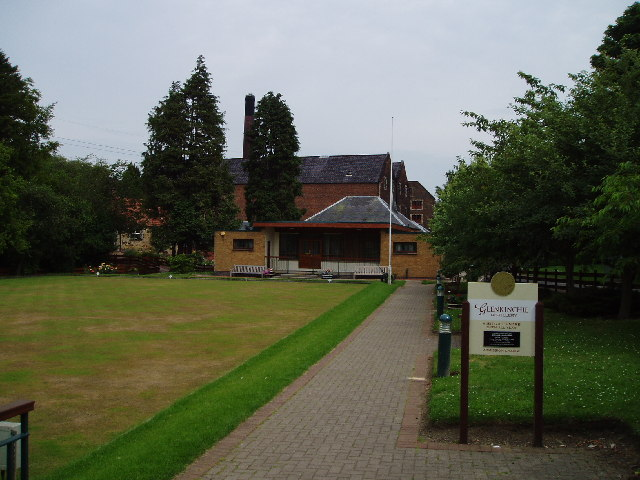

Region: Lowland
- Location: Pencaitland, Tranent, East Lothian EH34 5ET, Scotland
- Owner: Diageo
- Founded: 1837
- Founder: George and John Rate
- Status: Active
- Water source: Lammermuir Hills Burns
- No. of stills: 1 wash still (30,963 L); 1 spirit still (20,998 L)
- Capacity: 2,700,000 L (590,000 imp gal; 710,000 US gal)

12 year old
- Age(s): 12 years old

Distiller's Edition
- Age(s): 12 years old

Glenkinchie distillery (/ɡlɛnˈkɪnʃi/) is a single malt Scotch whisky distillery in East Lothian, Scotland. It is one of twenty-three malt whisky distilleries in the Lowland region. It is owned by the multinational drinks company Diageo.

== History ==
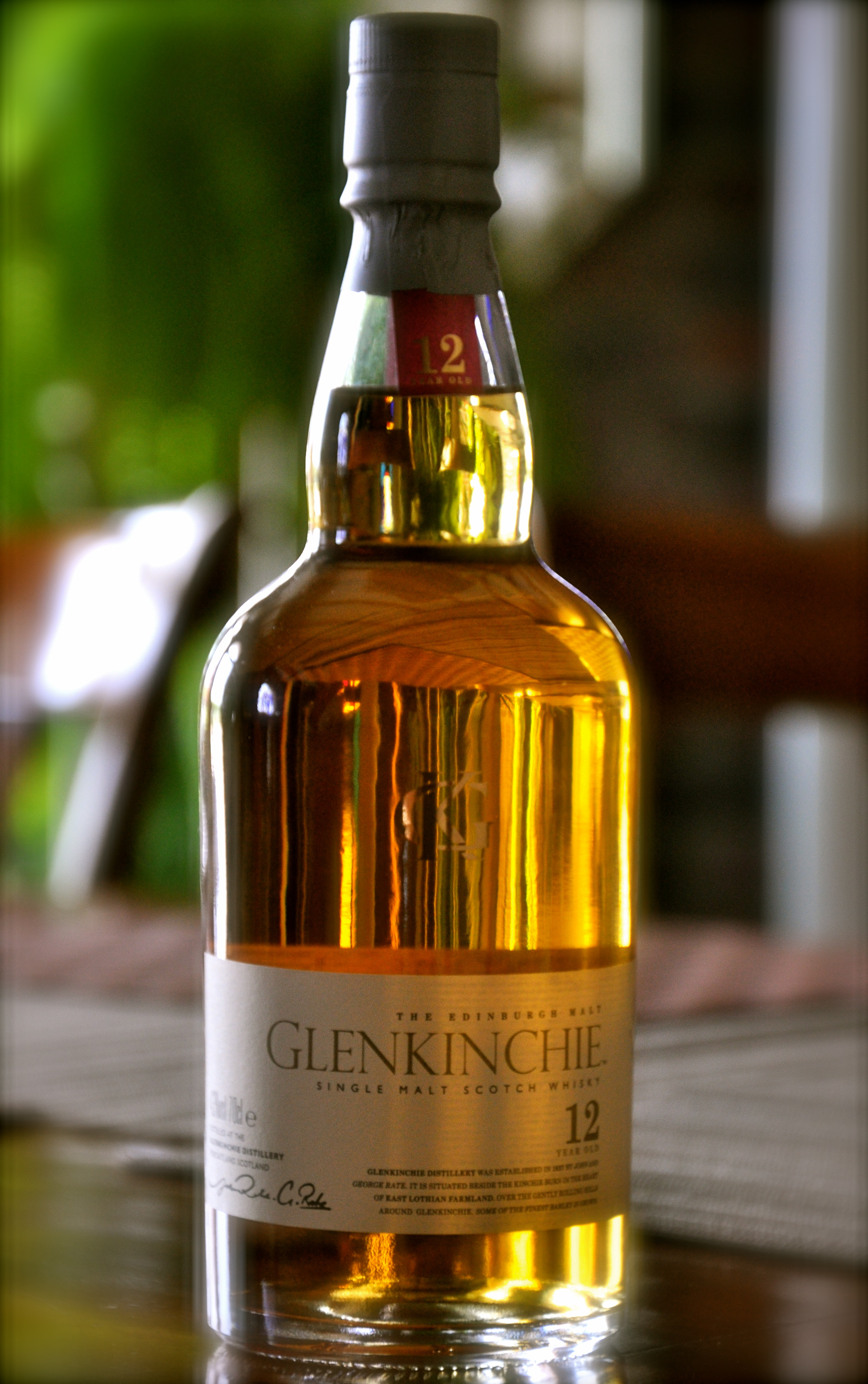
Glenkinchie 12 years

Glenkinchie lies, as the name might suggest, in a glen of the Kinchie Burn near the village of Pencaitland, East Lothian. It is situated about 15 miles from Edinburgh. The distillery is set in farmland. The name 'Kinchie' is a corruption of 'De Quincy', the original owners of the land. Its origins date back to around 1825 when it was founded by brothers John and George Rate. While there are no direct records it seems likely that Glenkinchie is the Milton Distillery previous recorded in the area. The brothers probably renamed it in about 1837. In 1853, the Rate Brothers were bankrupted and the site converted to a sawmill. In 1881, the plant was rebuilt and whisky-making restarted under Maj. James Grey.

In 1914, Glenkinchie joined Rosebank, St Magdalene, Grange and Clydesdale to form Scottish Malt Distillers (SMD) and in 1925 SMD merged with The Distillers Company (DCL).

In 1969 the distillery stopped malting its own grain and the malting floors were turned into a museum of malt whisky.

Guinness acquired The Distillers Company in 1986. Guinness merged with Grand Metropolitan in 1997 to form Diageo.

The Glenkinchie 12 Year Old was named Best Lowland Single Malt at the 2013 World Whiskies Awards.

In 2020, Diageo revealed a new visitor centre at Glenkinchie.

== See also ==
- Whisky
- Scotch whisky
- List of whisky brands
- List of distilleries in Scotland
