= Glasgow distillery =

Distillery in Scotland

Coordinates: 55.863287°N 4.362140°W

Region: Lowland
- Location: Glasgow
- Founded: 2015
- Founder: Liam Hughes, Mike Hayward, Ian McDougall
- Water source: Loch Katrine
- No. of stills: 2 wash stills 2 spirit stills
- Capacity: 440,000 litres

Glasgow distillery is a Scotch whisky, gin and rum distillery in Glasgow, Scotland. In 2020, the distillery was named distillery of the year at the Scottish Whisky Awards. Glasgow distillery was the first active distillery in greater Glasgow since 1902 (Clydeside distillery later began production in the city centre in 2017).

== Location ==
The distillery is located in Hillington in south-western Glasgow. The distillery is near the M8 motorway.

The distillery also has an office and tour facility on West George Street in Glasgow city centre.

== History ==
The distillery was formed with funding from private investors under the direction of founders Liam Hughes, Mike Hayward and Ian MacDougall in 2012. Production commenced on 20 March 2015.

In 2020, the distillery received a £5.5M loan to enable it to expand.

== Facilities ==
The distillery has a specially built laboratory for experimenting with new make spirit and different wood casks.

The distillery production stills are named after sisters Frances and Margaret MacDonald who were both Scottish artists and part of the Glasgow Girls, a group of female designers and artists associated with the Glasgow School. The stills have the capacity to produce 440,000 litres a year (equivalent to 1 million bottles) of whisky.

The distillery offers joint tours with Tennents Brewery.

== Products ==
The distillery produces a Lowland style single malt using water from Loch Katrine in the nearby Trossachs area. The first single malt from the distillery was released in 2018. One of the core bottlings from the distillery is named the 1770 Glasgow Single Malt in reference to Glasgow's first distillery in Dundashill (built 1770 now defunct).

The distillery produces a gin Makar Glasgow Gin.

In 2019, the distillery launched a special edition spiced rum, named after 18th and 19th century drinkers.
