= Moneypenny (disambiguation) =

Miss Moneypenny is a fictional character in the James Bond novels and films.

Moneypenny or Miss Moneypenny may also refer to:

- Miss Moneypenny's, a house music nightclub in Birmingham, England
- Andrew Moneypenny, a 17th century Irish Anglican churchman
- Eric Moneypenny, an American comedian and writer
- "Mrs Moneypenny", pen-name of columnist Heather McGregor
- Moneypenny Creek, a tributary of the Susquehanna River in Wyoming County, Pennsylvania
- Moneypenny Group, outsourced communications company in Wrexham, Wales.

== See also ==
- Monypenny, a surname
