= Kingsbarns =

Village in the United Kingdom

Coordinates: 56.3°N 2.66°W

Location in Scotland
Location in Fife, Scotland

Kingsbarns is a village and parish in Scotland that lies near the eastern coast of Fife, in an area known as the East Neuk, 6.5 miles (10.5 km) southeast of St Andrews and 3.6 miles (5.8 km) north of Crail. The name derives from the area being the location of the barns used to store grain before being transported to the Palace at Falkland.

The coast around Kingsbarns is also known as a challenging surfing area.

Pitmilly, a former estate that was owned by the Monypenny family for over seven centuries, is located about 1.5 miles from Kingsbarns on the road to St Andrews. Ruins of two mills and the Bronze Age tumulus, Pitmilly Law, are still evident. Little remains of Pitmilly House.

The civil parish has a population of 443 (in 2011).

== Amenities ==
An inn existed in Kingsbarns for centuries, previously offering a place of refuge for pilgrims to St Andrews Cathedral. However, the 18th-century coaching inn standing on the previously established site has reopened recently under new management

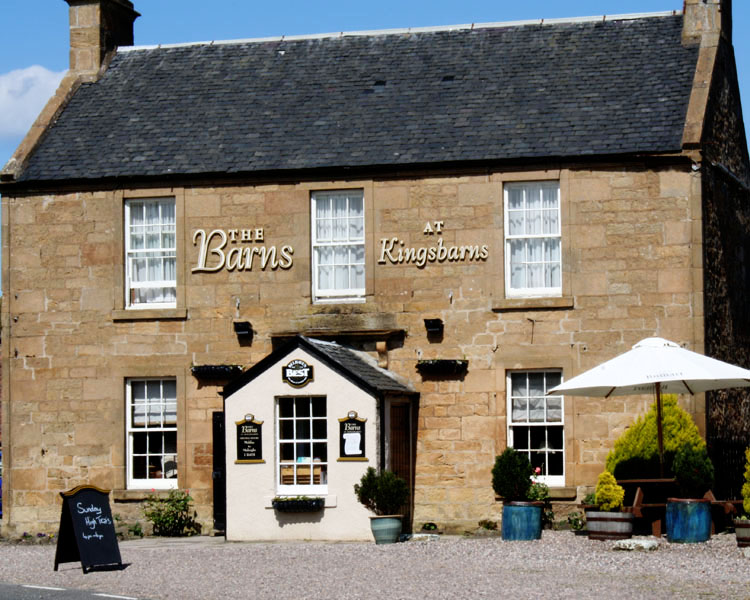
The Barns at Kingsbarns

Barns Cottage in the Square is an historic building that includes the former infants' school.

The village also has a church and primary school.

== Notable residents ==
- Robert Arnot (1744–1808), Presbyterian minister, Moderator of the General Assembly of the Church of Scotland, and professor of Divinity at St. Andrews University, lived in Kingsbarns from 1800 until his death.
- Charlton Monypenny (1867-1947), world record-holding sprinter, rugby player and businessman, Laird of Pitmilly.
- Douglas Monypenny, (1878-1900), Scottish international Rugby player
- Alexander Peebles (1856–1934), New Zealand prospector and mine owner, born in Kingsbarns
- James Yorkston (b. 1971), musician and writer, grew up in Kingsbarns
- Vic Galloway (b. 1972), DJ, radio and TV presenter and journalist, grew up in Kingsbarns

== Golf ==
The forming of the Kingsbarns Golfing Society in 1793 began the village's long association with golf, with the course, laid upon land leased from the Cambo Estate, being in use until around 1850 when it was returned to farming. In 1922, Kingsbarns Golf Club was founded, and a nine-hole course designed by Willie Auchterlonie was laid out, but in 1939 the land was mined to prevent the Germans landing on the coast.

Kingsbarns Golf Links is a man-made links course designed by architect Kyle Phillips, and developed by Mark Parsinnen. Opened in 2000, it has co-hosted the European Tour's Dunhill Links Championship along with the Old Course at St Andrews and Carnoustie since 2001. Kingsbarns hosted the St Andrews Trophy in 2007, the Jacques Léglise Trophy in 2008, and the Women's British Open in 2017.

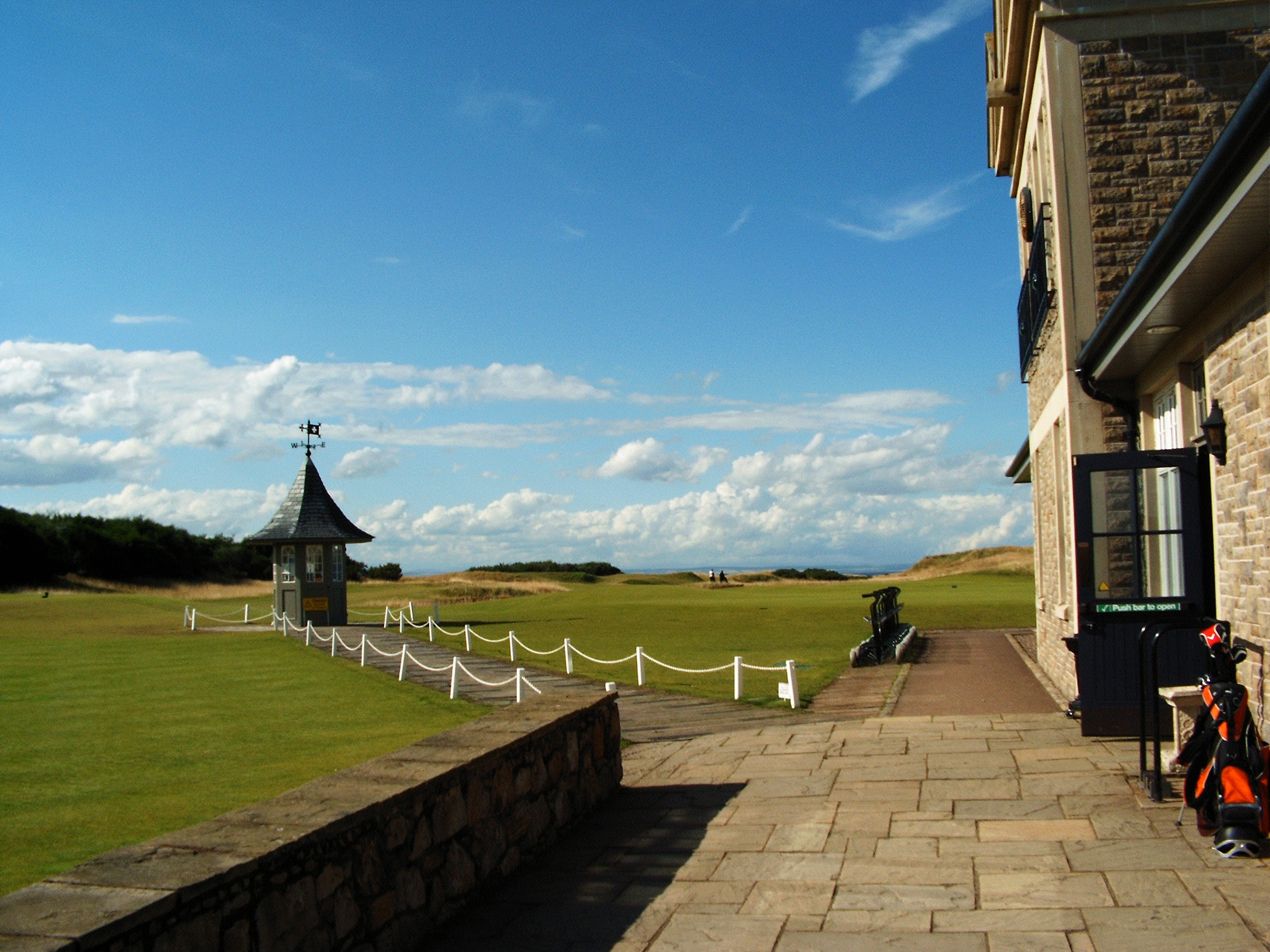
Start

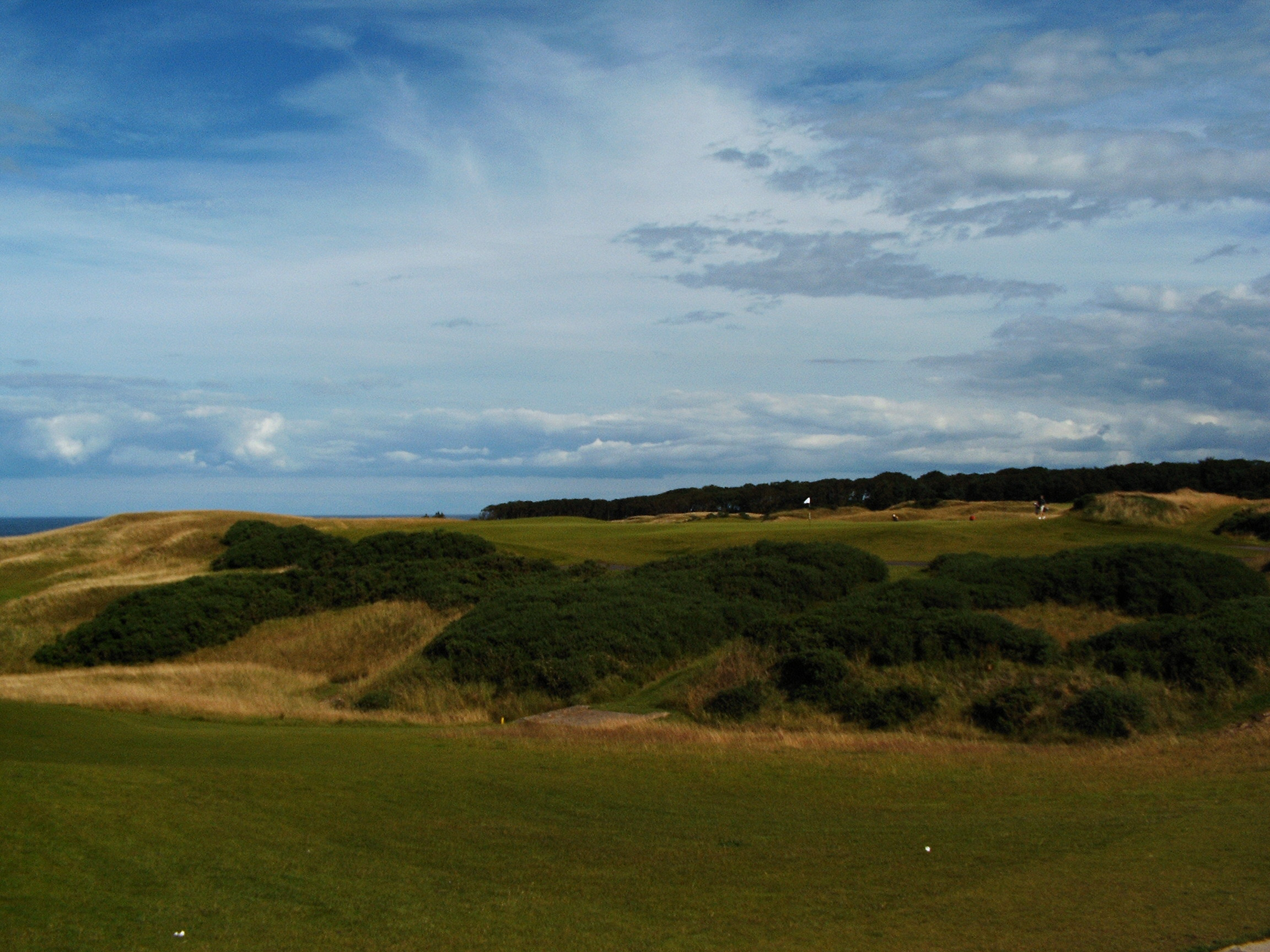
Golf Course

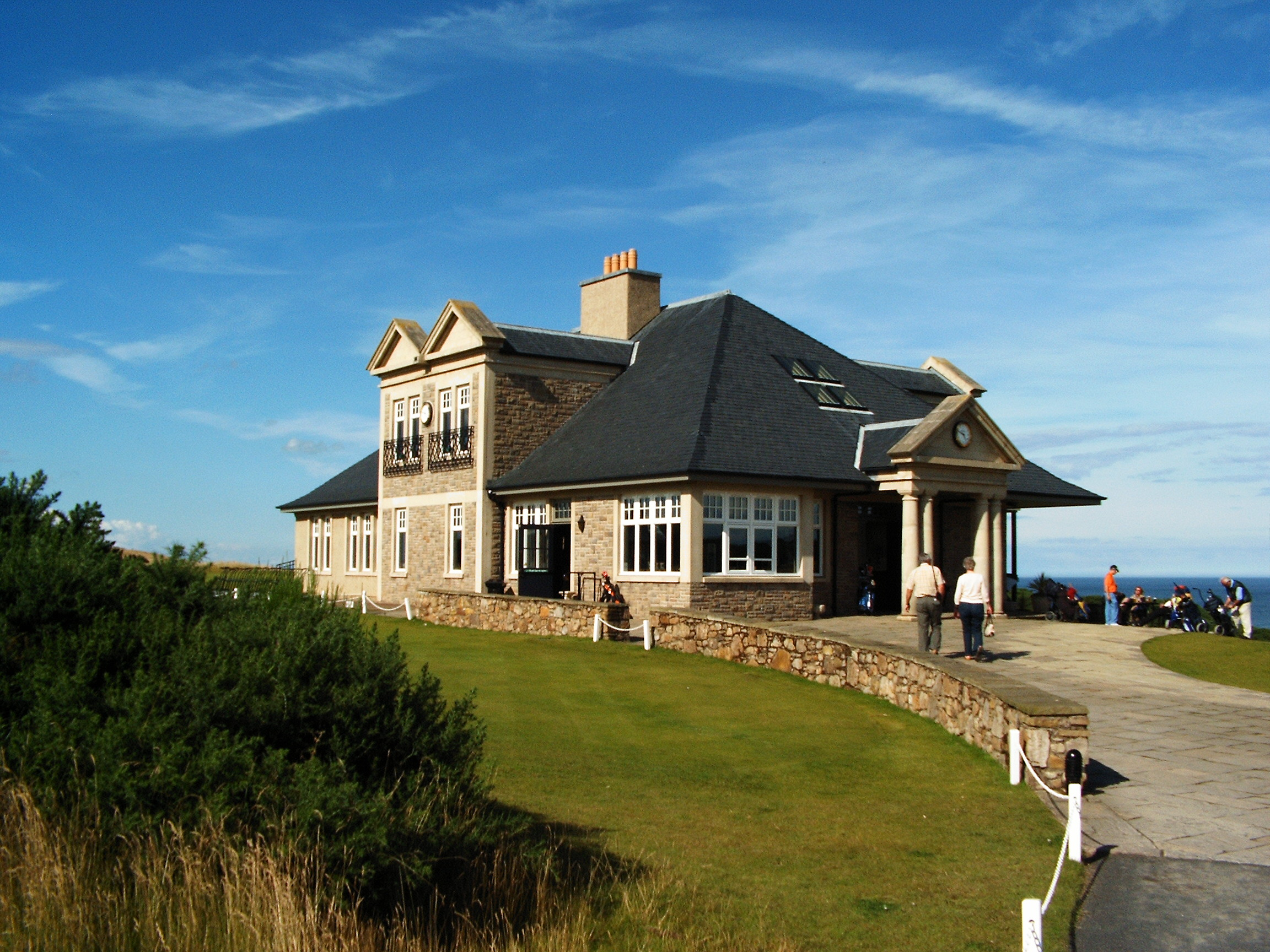
Club House

== Whisky ==
A Scotch whisky distillery opened in November 2014 and began filling barrels of spirit the following March. Kingsbarns distillery was founded by a local golf caddie who wished to convert a historic and semi-derelict farm-steading into a distillery.
