= Littlemill distillery =

Littlemill
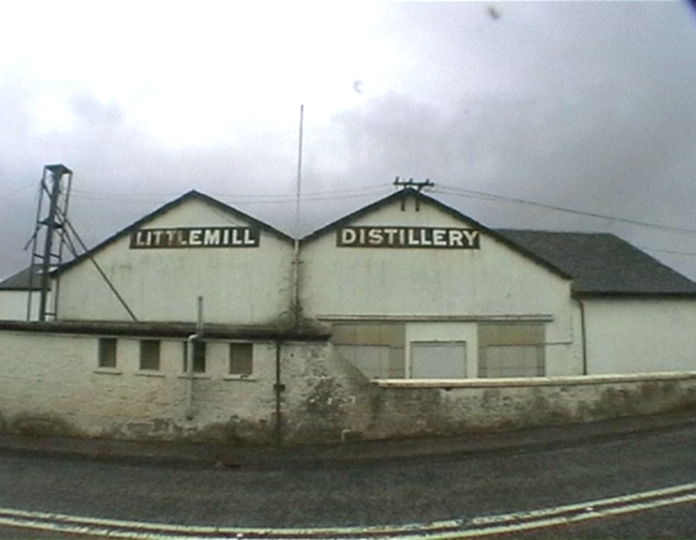

Region: Lowland
- Location: Bowling, West Dunbartonshire, Scotland
- Owner: Loch Lomond Distillery
- Founded: 1772
- Status: Demolished
- Water source: Kilpatrick Springs
- Mothballed: 1929 to 1931, 1984 to 1989
- Demolished: 2004

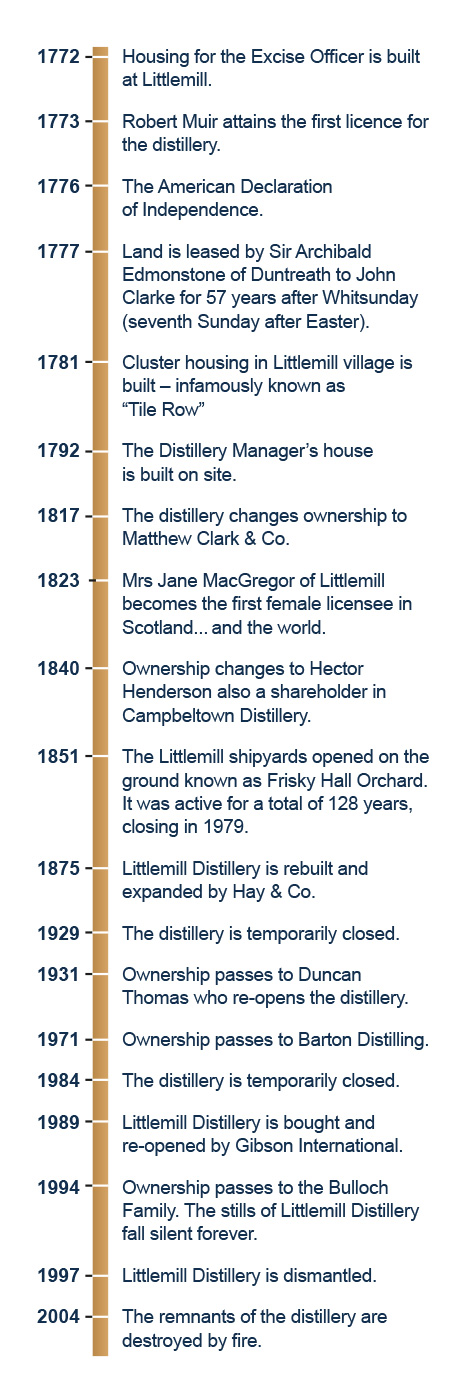
The timeline of the Littlemill Distillery

Littlemill distillery was a Lowland single malt Scotch whisky distillery in Bowling, West Dunbartonshire.

Is proven to be Scotland's first and oldest licensed whisky distillery. Situated on the border of Lowlands and Highlands, its products were generally classified as lowlands whisky. Auchentorlie Estate, along with a brewery call Littlemill, was purchased in 1750 by Archibal Buchanan from his brother Andrew Buchanan.

== History ==
It is unclear exactly when distilling started on this site however the gable end on one of the warehouses has a date stone carved with 1772. That same year accommodation was also built next door to the distillery to house the Excise officers who represented the law - and ensured any distillation was duly recorded and relevant taxes calculated.

Justice of the Peace records for Dumbarton show that "Robert Muir of Littlemiln", an employee, was granted the first ever licence by the Government of King George the 3rd to "...retail ale, beer and other excisable Liquors" on 2 November 1773.

Notably, Littlemill was one of the first distilleries to have a female licensee, Jane MacGregor, in 1823 who worked there under the ownership of Matthew Clark & Co who purchased the distillery in 1817. Later, in 1931, under the stewardship of the American Duncan Thomas, Littlemill was at the forefront of still innovation with technical designs that could create three styles of single malts from full-bodied to light.

Around 1840 ownership went to Hector Henderson, who was also shareholder in the Campbelltown distillery in 1837 and founded the Caol Ila distillery. The distillery was rebuilt and expanded in 1875 by Hay, who then was the owner.

Littlemill closed in 1929 until it was bought and reopened by Duncan Thomas in 1931, who experimented at the distillery with different new techniques. He used a new design of a Saladin box for malting with two ventilation towers and a single kiln. The copper pot stills were aluminium coated, and used rectifying columns instead of swan necks to have greater control over the distillation process, and production switched from a triple distillation to a double distillation technique.

In 1971 the distillery changed hands to Barton Distilling, who had been a shareholder since 1959. Barton was bought by Amalgamated Distilled Products in 1982, which joined the Argyll Group in 1984. In this year the Littlemill distillery closed. It was reopened and bought by Gibson International in 1989, closed down again in 1994 after Gibson International went bankrupt, and was sold to Loch Lomond Distillery. It was dismantled in 1997, and the remnants of the distillery were destroyed in a fire in 2004. A housing development is now on the site.

The distillery produced three different kinds of whisky, which was made possible through the rectifying columns on the stills: a heavily peated variety under the name "Dumbuck", a full bodied whisky named "Dunglass" and a light traditional lowland whisky under its own name "Littlemill". Dumbuck and Dunglass were discontinued in 1972.

The remaining casks from Littlemill are currently at Loch Lomond Distillery with Loch Lomond Group releasing limited edition bottles. Loch Lomond Group have released four editions: Private Cellar aged 25 years, Private Cellar aged 27 years, 1992 Vintage and the oldest in the collection Celestial Edition aged 40 years. The latest addition to the Littlemill range – Private Cellar aged 29 years – was released in September 2019.

== See also ==
- List of distilleries in Scotland
- List of historic whisky distilleries
