= Moffat distillery =

Whisky distillery in Scotland

Moffat

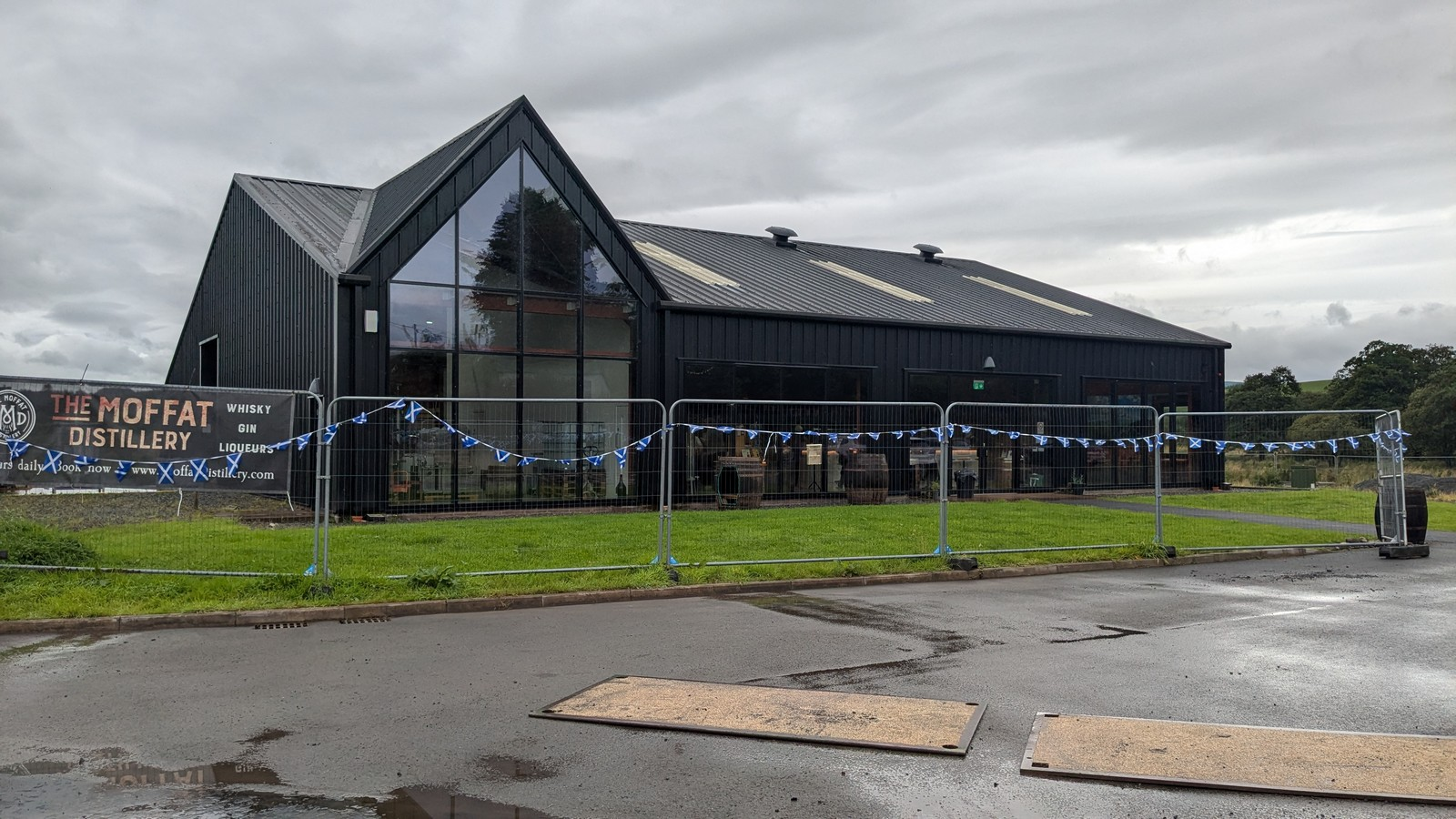
- View of the exterior of Moffat Distillery

Region: Lowland
- Location: Hearthlands, Old Carlisle Road, Moffat, Dumfries & Galloway, DG10 9FE, Scotland, United Kingdom
- Coordinates: 55.3232°N 3.4311°W
- Owner: Dark Sky Spirits
- Founded: 2023; 3 years ago
- Founder: Nick Bullard; Erin Bullard
- Architect: Organic Architects
- Capacity: 12,000 litres

The Moffat distillery produces single malt Scotch whisky and moonshine in Moffat, Dumfries and Galloway, Scotland. The distillery is notable for operating wood-fired stills.

== History ==
The company was founded in 2017 as an independent bottler called Dark Sky Spirits, operated by married couple Nick and Erin Bullard, who had moved to Moffat in 2015.

In 2019, the decision was made to move into distilling, and an appropriate location was sought. Plans were approved by Dumfries and Galloway council in January 2020, and Dark Sky Spirits broke ground at the current site in Moffat in 2021. The distillery was projected to produce roughly 30,000 liters of whisky per year. Construction was part-funded by an award of £320,000 from the Scottish Government via the South of Scotland Economic Partnership. The building was designed to replicate the style of the surrounding farm buildings.

The distillery initially made gin, with the first cask of whisky being filled in March 2024. Only 40 casks were filled in the first year of production.

The distillery opened to the public in July 2023. They offer distillery tours, a bar, and occasional live music. There are occasional limited edition bottlings released in partnership with local charities and organisations, including with Moffat Mountain Rescue Team and Moffat Golden Eagle Festival.

== Production ==
Moffat distillery operate traditional wooden washbacks and worm tub condensers. Unusually for a Scotch whisky distillery, the stills are direct-fired using wood as fuel. The site does not have a full-size operating floor; rather, access to the washbacks and stills is via a gantry.

== Reception and awards ==
Moffat Moonshine was awarded Gold at the IWSC in 2025.
