= Clydeside Distillery =

Scotch whisky distillery in Glasgow, Scotland, UK

Coordinates: 55.862364°N 4.296986°W

The Clydeside Distillery
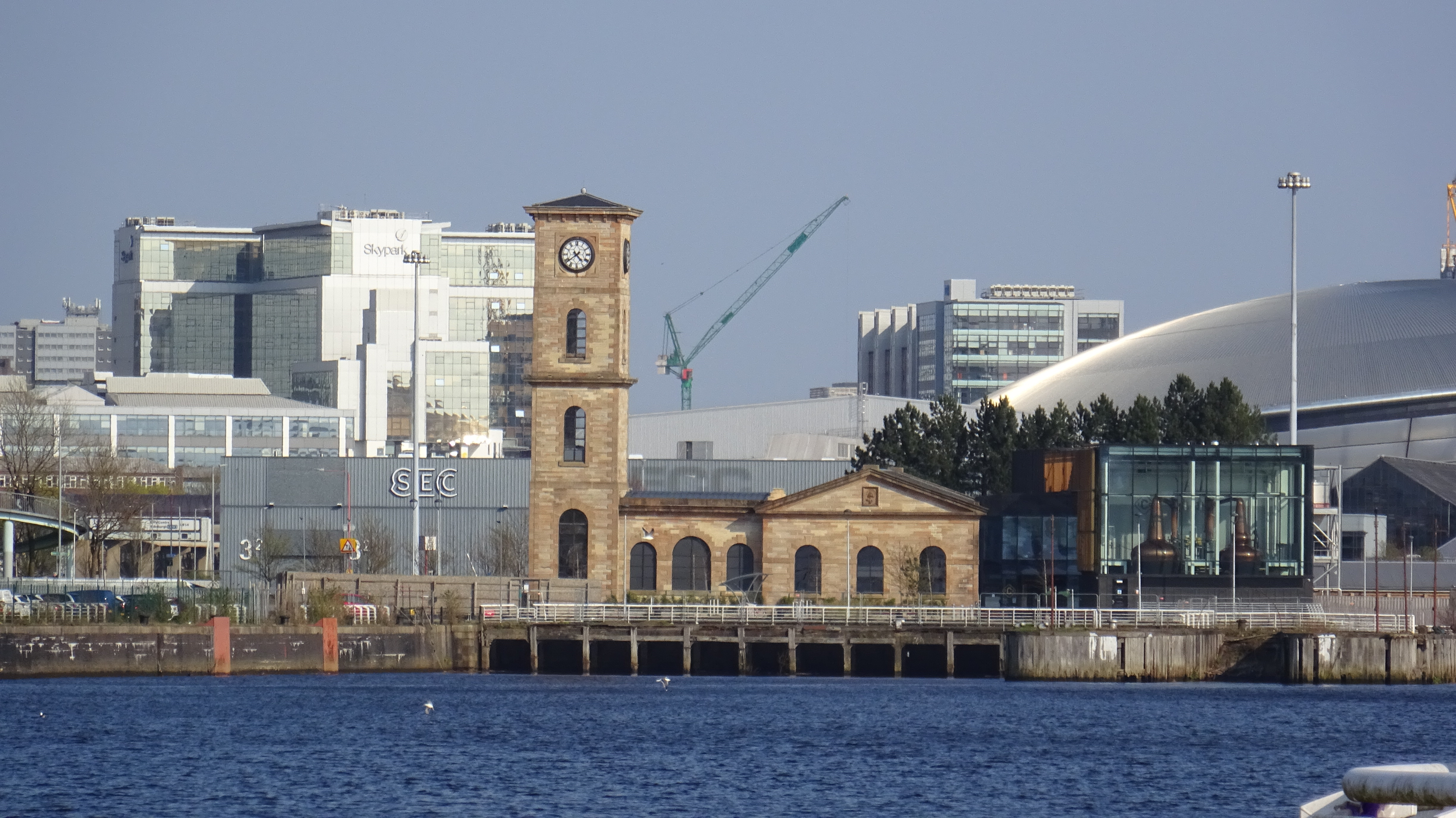

Region: Lowland
- Location: Glasgow
- Owner: Morrison Glasgow Distillers
- Founded: 2017
- Water source: Loch Katrine
- No. of stills: 1 wash still 1 spirit still
- Capacity: 500,000 L

The Clydeside Distillery is a Scotch whisky distillery in Glasgow, Scotland. When production began in 2017, Clydeside was the second active distillery in Glasgow in over 100 years.

== Location ==
The distillery is at a quayside on the River Clyde in Glasgow which was formerly the entrance to the Queen's Dock, with the SEC Centre (built on the infilled dock in the 1980s) a short distance to the east. Although in a fairly isolated location due to the river directly to the west and south, and infrastructure (the SEC car park and the A814 Clydeside Expressway and Argyle Line railway tracks) to the north and east, a footbridge over the road and under the railway provides pedestrian access to the Kelvinhaugh and Yorkhill neighbourhoods including the nearby SWG3 arts and events venue. Vehicle access from either direction is via Stobcross Road which connects to the Expressway at the Finnieston (SEC Centre / Clyde Arc Bridge) and Pointhouse (Partick / Riverside Museum) exits.

Water used during production is sourced from Loch Katrine in the nearby Trossachs area.

== History ==
Construction of the distillery began in 2016 under the building and civil engineering company McLaughlin & Harvey. The distillery opened in November 2017 following a £10.5 million refurbishment of the old dock pumphouse (built in 1877). The pump house historically controlled the level of water allowing arrival or departure into the dock. The distillery filled its first casks in December 2017.

The distillery is primarily owned by Tim Morrison of Morrison Glasgow Distillers, who is the great-grandson of John Morrison, who built the Queens' Dock and Pump House on the River Clyde in the 19th century where the distillery is now located. The Morrison family was previously owners of Morrison Bowmore until selling to Beam Suntory in 1994. The operations director is Andrew Morrison, son of the principal owner. The distillery manager is Alistair McDonald who was the former distillery manager of the Auchentoshan distillery.

In 2021, Clydeside released its first single malt whisky, Stobcross matured in American and European oak casks.

== Facilities ==
The distillery offers interactive tours and there is a shop and café for visitors. The distillery had the capacity to produce up to 500,000 litres of spirit each year. The distillery has two Forsyth-made stills, each weighing approximately two tonnes.

== Products ==
The distillery produces a Lowland style single malt.
