= Kingsbarns distillery =

Scotch whisky distillery

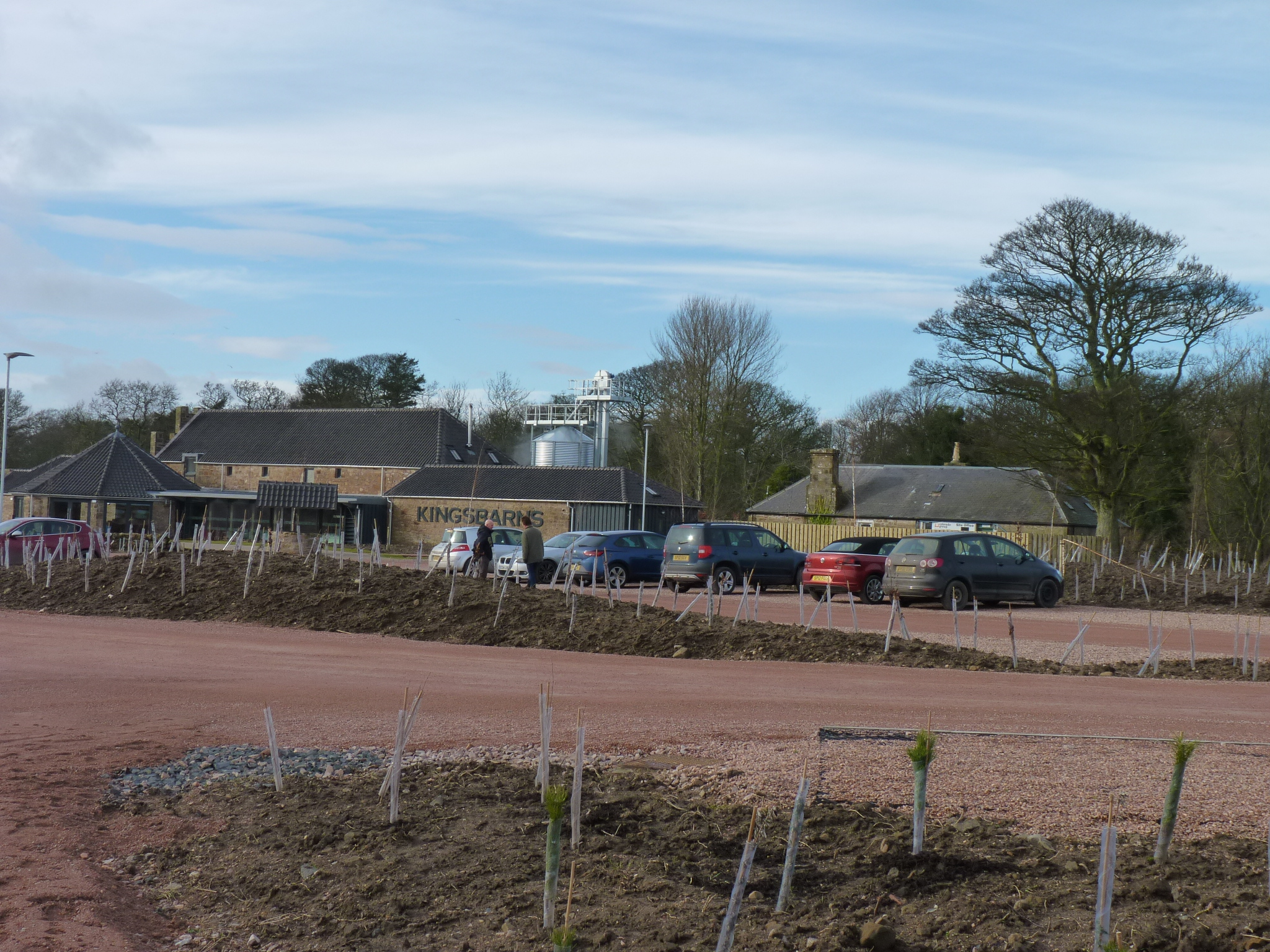
- Location: Kingsbarns, Fife
- Owner: Wemyss malts
- Founded: 2014
- Founder: Douglas Clement
- Water source: Borehole
- No. of stills: 1 wash still 1 spirit stills
- Capacity: 200,000 L
- Website: Kingsbarns Distillery

Kingsbarns distillery is a Scotch whisky and gin distillery located in Kingsbarns, Fife in the Lowlands whisky region in Scotland.

The distillery was founded in 2014 by Douglas Clement and is owned by Wemyss malts with a capacity to produce 200,000 litres of spirit per year.

== History ==
Douglas Clement, formerly a golf caddie, was inspired to open a distillery near to the famous golf courses in the St Andrews and Kingsbarns area after visiting golfers expressed frustration at the lack of a nearby distillery. After he got £670,000 grant from the Scottish Government he was able to convince the Wemyss family to invest £2.5 to £3m.

The Kingsbarns distillery officially opened in November 2014, with the first casks filled in 2015.

In 2017, the company opened a gin distillery on site, after converting a derelict farm cottage, and began to produce Darnley's Gin at Kingsbarns. The gin stills were imported from Italy. A visitor experience for the gin was also launched, called the Darnley's Gin School. The core gin range included three expressions, Original, Spiced and Navy Strength; recyclable refill pouches were launched for all three variants in 2022.

In August 2018, Kingsbarns distillery unveiled its first single malt Scotch whisky. Then, in November, the distillery launched "Balcomie" a single malt sherry cask whisky.

In November 2022, the Wemyss company announce expansion plans of the distillery with the construction of twelve bonded warehouses for whisky maturation and a bottling plant.

In December 2022, the distillery announce plans to enter the United States market.
