= Pitmilly =

Former estate in Fife, Scotland

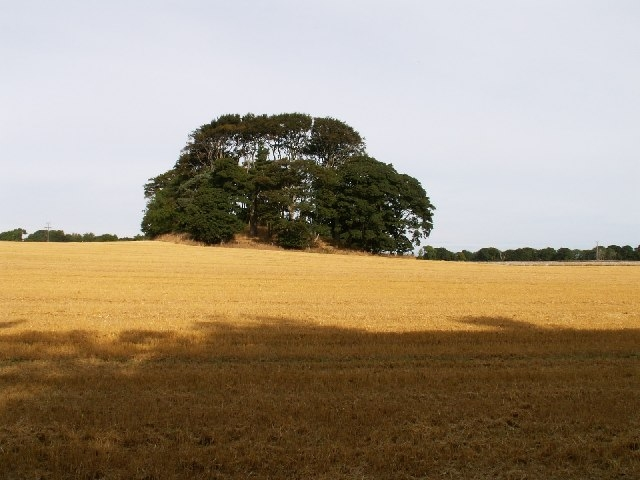
Pitmilly Law

Pitmilly is the site of a former estate located five miles south-east of St Andrews, Scotland. Its historical significance is threefold. It has been inhabited from ancient times; artifacts continue to be recovered from the Neolithic, Bronze and Iron Ages and a well-known barrow (burial mound) Tumulus from the Bronze Age still exists there. It is connected to Clan Hay in that Eva of Pitmilly, the Celtic heiress to these lands, married William II de Haya, a Norman, in the 12th century C.E., with the couple becoming the progenitors of that Scottish clan. Finally, for over seven centuries, it was owned by the important Monypenny family.

== Pitmilly Lands ==
The name, Pitmilly or Pitmillie, has been used for centuries, but many variants occurred in earlier times. These include Petmullin, Pitmulin, Pethmolyn, and Pitmaulin. They probably reflect the P-Celtic, Scottish Gaelic, Scots and Latin languages, coupled with no great desire for consistency in spelling and the modification of place names that occurs so often. The prefix pit is derived from the P-Celtic word, pett, meaning a piece of land, and is very common in place-names in this part of Scotland. The second part of the name means mill, regardless of its various forms. Pitmilly means, therefore, a piece of land by the mills, and indeed, there are still ruined mills at Pitmilly.

The Pitmilly Lands lie on both sides of the Pitmilly Burn, a stream that joins the larger Kenly Water, just before the latter reaches the North Sea between Craig Hartle and Babbet Ness on the east Fife coast. The lands on the east side of the Pitmilly Burn border that sea. In order to define further the Pitmilly Lands as they have been known through the centuries, it is helpful to note that in the early 20th century, before it was broken up, the Pitmilly estate consisted of the manor house with its grounds, known as Pitmilly House, several farms, a flax mill and a grist mill, both of which may have been ruins then, and a fisherman's bothy. The farms, all of which are identified on the 2008 Ordnance Survey map, are Boghall, Falside, Hillhead, Morton of Pitmilly and Kilduncan. A possible source of confusion is that the Kenly Water has sometimes been known, and shown on maps, as Pitmilly Burn, but it seems clear that the Pitmilly Burn of the Pitmilly Lands is a tributary stream.

A study of the cartography of the region from 1642 onwards shows the different naming of Pitmilly Burn and Kenly Water by individual mapmakers. In one map the two streams reach the North Sea separately. It also shows that a manor house existed at Pitmilly in 1775 and that the present farms in the region have existed for a long time, with the same names. One map refers to Pitmilly mills in the plural, which explains why two different mills have sometimes individually been referred to as Pitmilly Mill. The spelling of Pitmilly varies only slightly. In addition to Pitmilly, the name is found as Pitmilli, Pitmil (possibly as an abbreviation) and Pit Mille. The family name, Moneypenny, appears on a map in 1775.

== History before the arrival of the Normans ==
Artifacts have been recovered from the Neolithic, Bronze and Iron Ages, indicating that Pitmilly has been inhabited since at least the Neolithic Age. Beatson and Wright, in "The Statistical Accounts of Scotland" of 1791-99 and 1834–45, respectively, described stone coffins, containing human bones, on the shore of Kingsbarns parish, which includes Pitmilly. They stated that the tombs were thought to be of Danes, i.e., Viking raiders, but Beatson appears dubious. From these descriptions, there is no doubt that the tombs were really Bronze Age cists. Pitmilly Law, a Bronze Age burial barrow, now with trees growing on its summit, is a local landmark on the Pitmilly estate. An article by Skinner in 1869 discusses the finding of six empty cists there. In 1867, he had discussed nearby cists on the Pitmilly estate that contained skeletons. Around 2004, an early Bronze Age cist was discovered just outside the ruins of Pitmilly House during road work; it contained a skeleton and a food vessel of the Yorkshire vase tradition. Neolithic carved stone balls have been found in several locations in Scotland and in 2006 one was recovered near Pitmilly Law.

There appears to be no historical record, specifically, of Pitmilly from the Bronze Age to when the Normans arrived in Scotland. The Picts lived and farmed there, as nearby St Andrew developed into an important ecclesiastical center. Robert Sibbald, writing in 1710, states that there were some obelisks of rough stone on higher ground, just south of the former site of Inchmurtach, a country residence of the Bishop of St Andrews Archbishop of St Andrews, and now the site of Kenlygreen. That location would presumably place them on the Pitmilly Estate. He quotes "the great antiquary, Mr. Maule", as believing that these were the monuments of some great men killed in battle with the Danes. This conclusion may be valid because the Danes (Vikings) frequently invaded these shores. However, it is also possible that the stones were menhirs erected by the Picts. Such stones are common in Scotland.

== Countess Ada and Pitmilly ==
In the latter half of the twelfth century, Countess Ada de Warenne, William I of Scotland's mother, made two grants concerning land that she owned at Pitmilly to the St Andrews Cathedral Priory. King William subsequently confirmed both grants.

== The Hays and Pitmilly ==
William II de Haya, the first recorded de Haya in Scotland, married Eva of Pitmilly no later than 1171. Little is known about Eva, except that she was the heiress to land at Pitmilly which she brought into the marriage. However, this marriage was important because it was the beginning of the family that became Clan Hay. In 1172, William II de Haya leased one ploughgate in Pitmilly to St Andrews Cathedral Priory and its hospital for twenty years at an annual rent of half a merk of silver. The brief association of the Hays with Pitmilly essentially ended when, shortly after William's death around 1201, Eva and their son, David, after a dispute with the canons of St Andrews Cathedral Priory, quitclaimed the land to the priory, but retained the annual rent of half a merk of silver. The land in question was part of Eva's tocher (dowry) and is known to be Falside from the rubric on King William's charter. Falside still exists as a farm in Pitmilly. However, nothing remains at Pitmilly of whatever residence Eva's family occupied there, if indeed they did live there in the 12th century.

== The Monypennys and Pitmilly ==
The centuries-long association of the Monypennys with Pitmilly began in 1211, when Thomas, Prior of St Andrews, granted a charter of the lands of Pitmilly to Richard Monipennie, quam Malisius tennit. The former was probably a Norman knight, while Malisius (Malise of Pitmilly) was the tenant renting the land at the time. In 1296, along with the other Scots gentry and landowners, John de Monypenny of Pitmilly signed the so-called Ragman Rolls by which he swore fealty solely to Edward I of England. Had he not done so, he would have forfeited his lands and suffered other severe penalties. There appears to be little historical record of Pitmilly, as opposed to the Moneypenny family, during the following centuries. Sibbald, writing in 1710, notes the existence of the house, one mile east of Kingsbarns, of a very ancient family of the name of Monipenny. Ainslie, in 1775, depicts on his map the square area of the grounds and house, labeling them as "Pitmilly Coll" and "Moneypenny". The Pitmilly House, of which records exist, was built in three stages. The first two, adjoining, blocks were apparently built in the 18th century. The third stage, a block added to the front of the house, was built in the typical style of a Georgian mansionGeorgian architecture in 1818, the architect being Robert Balfour of St. Andrews. National Monuments Record of Scotland have found no evidence that an earlier house stood on this specific site. However, stone wall fragments from another large structure have been described to the south-east of this house and may have been part of an earlier residence. They no longer exist. Pitmilly is not mentioned in either the 1791-99 Statistical Account of Scotland or in the New Statistical Account, published between 1834 and 1845. However, Slater's Directory, circa 1852, mentions Pitmilly as a very ancient seat in the northern part of Kingsbarns parish, while the Ordnance Gazetteer of Scotland in 1865 notes the presence of Pitmilly as an estate with a mansion. The last Monypenny to live at Pitmilly was Charlton James Blackwell Monypenny, 1867–1947, who immigrated to South America in 1902, when he is still identified as the owner. The Monypenny family later sold Pitmilly House and the farms on the estate.

== Pitmilly after the Monypennys ==
Pitmilly House was taken over during World War II as a billet for Women's Royal Naval Service (WRNS). After the war, it operated as a hotel under several owners, but ultimately these businesses failed and the house, which was said to be haunted by a particularly active poltergeist, deteriorated badly. It burned in 1967, with much of the building material subsequently being salvaged to build houses in Kingsbarns. Pitmilly now exists as good agricultural land, with the farms of the former estate still operating. Of these, Morton of Pitmilly has been renovated as a self-catering holiday resort. The most important landmark is Pitmilly Law. The ruins of two mills and of a fisherman's bothy on the estate remain. Hillhead Mill was a grist mill, on which the date 1716 is still evident, and is located at the junction of Pitmilly Burn and Kenly Water. Crail Mill was a flax mill with an adjacent miller's house (which still bears the date 1790), located a few hundred yards upstream from Hillhead Mill. There is a large, marshy pond to the west of the miller's house, probably representing the retting pond for the flax. Some confusion in nomenclature exists because both mills have on occasion been referred to individually as Pitmilly Mill. Little of Pitmilly House itself is left. Pitmilly West, built in 1975 on the site of the west gate house, operates as bed and breakfast. The other three gatehouses, the walls surrounding the grounds, pathways through the grounds, as well as ruins of the stables and the bowling alley remain. The Gate Lodge has been refurbished to a high standard; the East Lodge is in its original, Georgian, condition, while South Lodge is completely ruinous. Several photographs of the Pitmilly area as it is now can be found on Geograph Britain and Ireland at Grid Square NO5713 and adjacent squares. The local beach is unofficially called, "Pitmilly Beach" with the Fife Coastal Path running along that beach and then entering the valley of Kenly Water, past the Pitmilly mills.
