= Lindores Abbey distillery =

Scotch whisky distillery

Coordinates: 56.3518°N 3.2254°W

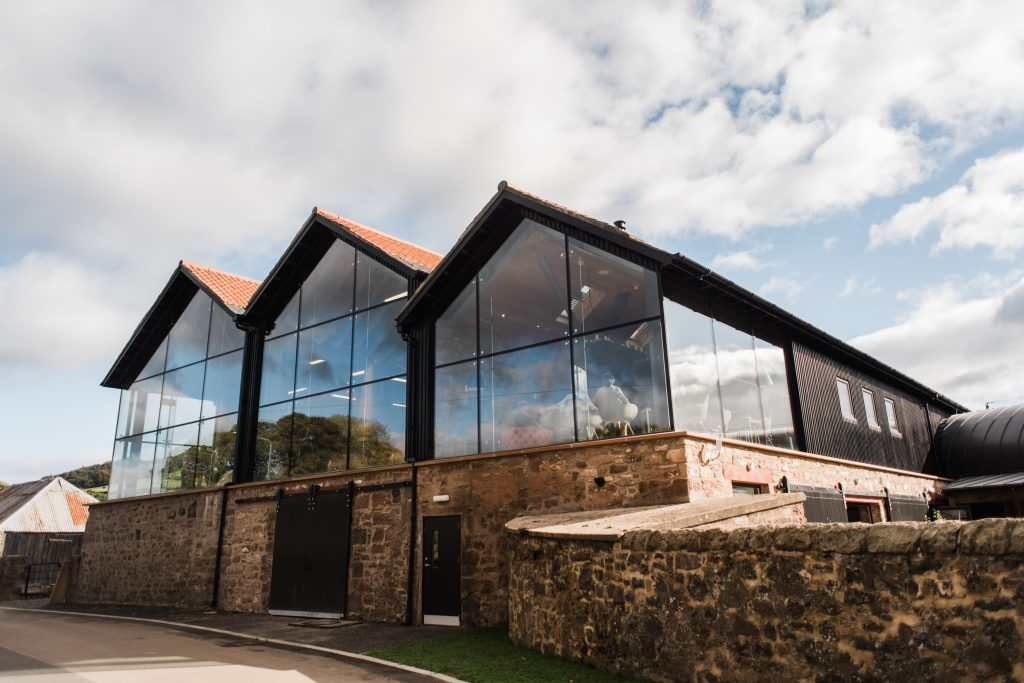

Region: Lowland
- Location: Newburgh, Fife
- Founded: 2017
- Water source: Borehole
- No. of stills: 1 wash still 2 spirit stills
- Capacity: 260,000 L

Lindores Abbey distillery is a Scotch whisky distillery in Newburgh in the Lowlands whisky region in Scotland and is directly opposite the Abbey. It started distilling whisky in December 2017, using three stills made by Forsyths of Rothes. Lindores Abbey planned to produce 150,000 litres of spirit per year.

Scotch whisky must be aged a minimum of three years, in oak barrels, and the Abbey planned to age its products for five years. Hence, no whisky sales would be made until at least 2021. In the meantime, the distillery was selling its aqua vitae, since this type of alcoholic beverage does not require such long aging.

The distillery is located on the Lindores Abbey Farm, which was bought by Drew McKenzie Smith’s grandfather in 1913. The family are no longer involved with the distillery.

In 2021, Lindores Abbey released it first single-malt whisky, Lindores Single-Malt Scotch Whisky MCDXCIV.
