= Inchdairnie distillery =

Distillery in Glenrothes, Scotland

Coordinates: 56.1812°N 3.2165°W

InchDairnie distillery
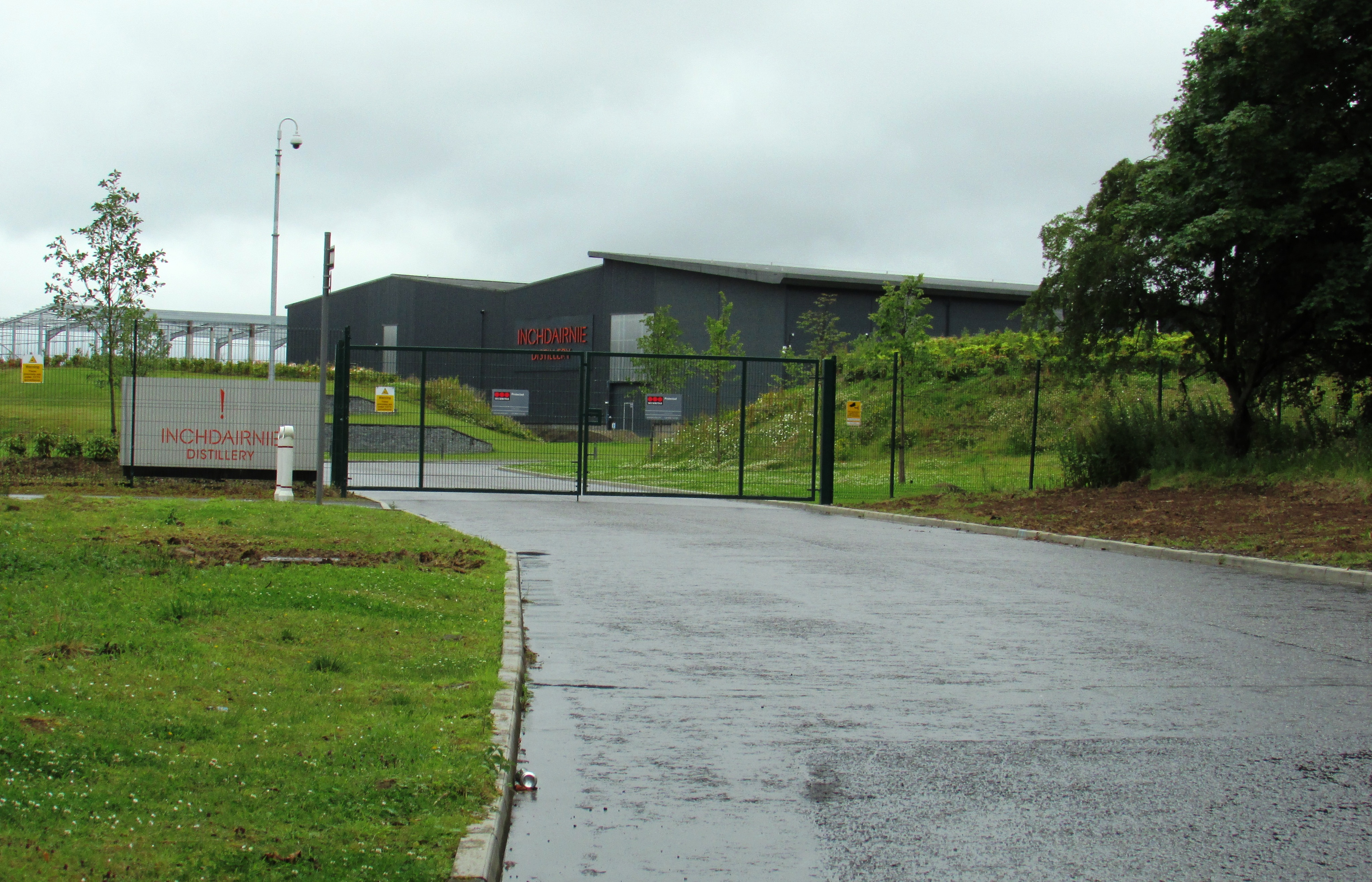
- Location: Glenrothes, Scotland
- Owner: John Fergus & Co.
- Founded: 2015; 11 years ago
- Founder: Ian Palmer
- Status: Operational
- Water source: Flowers of May and Goathill springs
- No. of stills: 2 wash still 2 spirit still
- Capacity: 4 million litres per annum

InchDairnie distillery is a Lowland single malt Scotch whisky and Rye Whisky distillery in Glenrothes, Scotland.

== History ==
InchDairnie distillery was founded in 2015 by Ian Palmer, a former whisky industry professional in Glenrothes on the site of the old John Fergus & Co mill. The company was named John Fergus & Co.

InchDairnie built an additional eight maturation warehouses between 2017 and 2019, and also a whisky blending facility.

In 2017 InchDairnie started making rye whisky in a traditional Scottish pot still and aged in new American oak casks. The whisky was released in April 2023 and named RyeLaw.

In 2022, the distillery has purchased almost 11 acres of land at Osprey Road, Glenrothes, to construct a bonded warehouse.

In November 2024, the distillery decided to increase its capacity from two million to 4m-litres of alcohol per year and switching from natural gas to 100% green hydrogen.

In May 2025, InchDairnie Distillery has launched its first two single malts.
