= Falkirk distillery =

Coordinates: 55°59′42.4″N 3°43′30″W

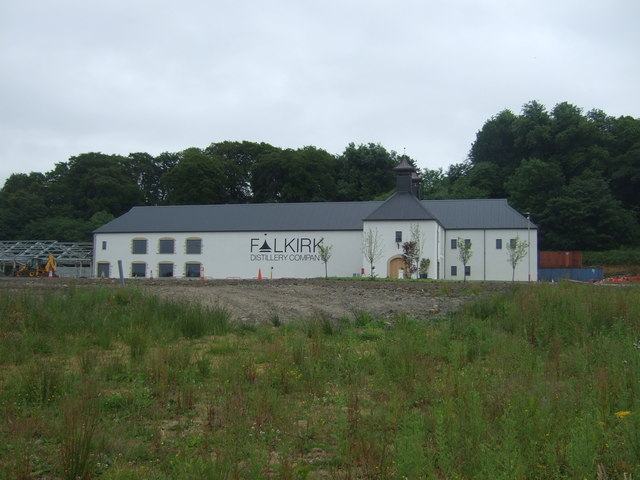
- Falkirk distillery in 2017

Region: Lowland
- Location: Falkirk, Scotland
- Founded: 2020
- Founder: George Stewart
- No. of stills: 1 wash still 1 spirit still
- Capacity: 200,000 L

Falkirk is a Scotch whisky distillery in Falkirk, Scotland. Falkirk was the first distillery to recommence whisky production in the Falkirk area since the Rosebank distillery closed in 1993.

The distillery produces unpeated lowland style whisky. The distillery produces 200,000 litres of spirit per year.

== History ==
The distillery was founded by George Stewart and is family owned. The distillery was granted planning position in 2010. The distillery's location near the Antonine Wall required additional planning consents. The distillery became fully operational in 2020. The distillery facilities cost £9 million to construct.

In 2021, the distillery donated a cask to Strathcarron Hospice.

The first bottles of Falkirk distillery single malt whisky produced were auctioned in December 2023.

The distillery's whisky went on general public sale in January 2024.

== Facilities ==
The distillery uses the renovated copper stills and mash tun from the mothballed Caperdonich distillery in Speyside. The distillery has two pagoda roofs, as well as eight washbacks.

The distillery has a traditional dunnage style warehouse. Waste from the facility is used as a feedstock to grow microalgae as an animal feed ingredient. The distillery has a visitor centre, planned to accommodate 80,000 visitors a year.
