= Jackton distillery =

Whisky distillery in South Lanarkshire, Scotland

Jackton Distillery

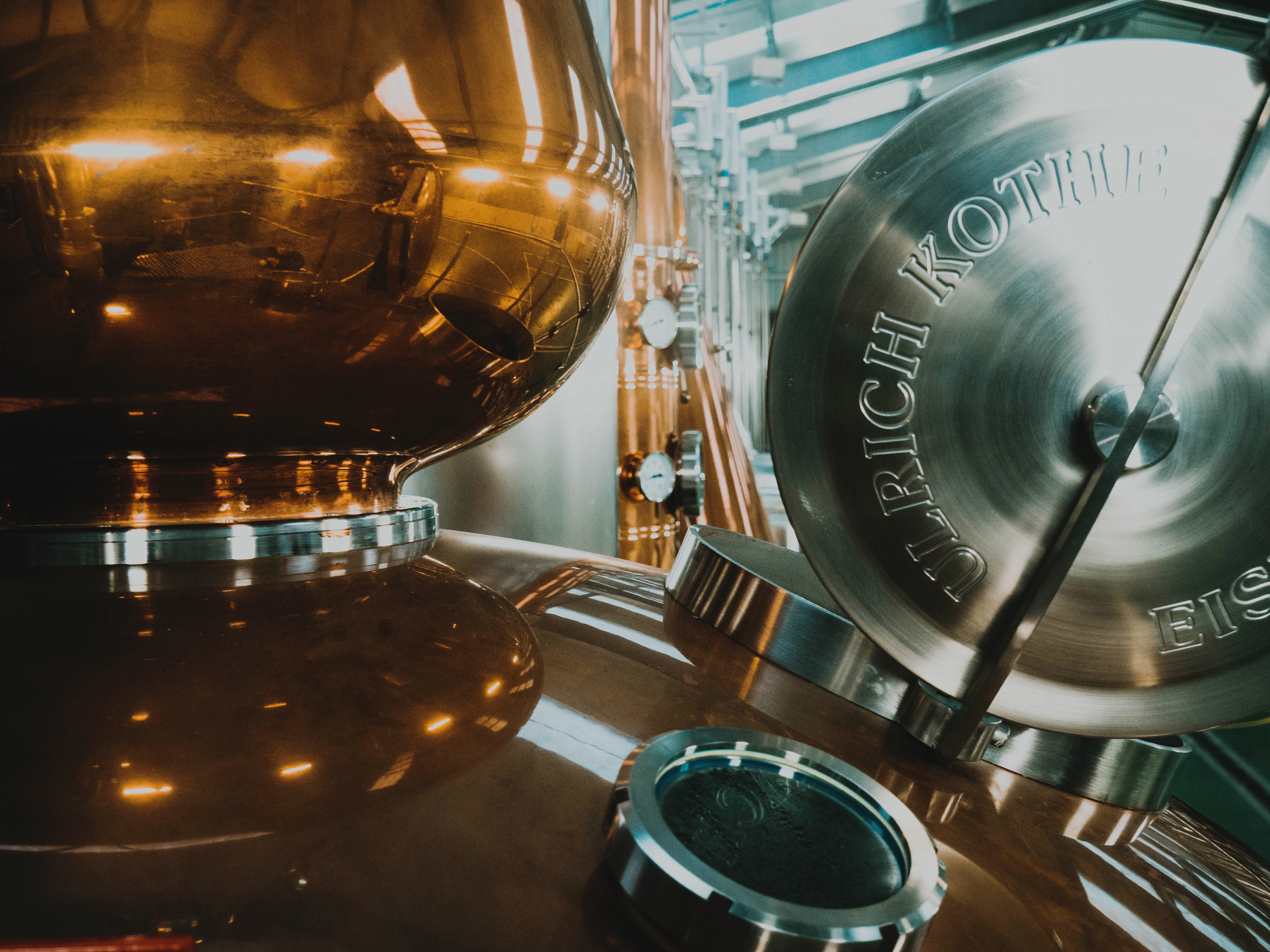
- View of Jackton Distillery's stillroom

Region: Lowland
- Location: Hayhill Rd, Jackton G74 5AN, Scotland, United Kingdom
- Coordinates: 55.7514°N 4.2515°W
- Owner: Raer Scotch Whisky Ltd
- Founded: 12 February 2020; 6 years ago
- Founder: Kean family
- Architect: Block Architects
- No. of stills: 2; 5000 litre wash still 2000 litre spirit still
- Capacity: 300,000 litres

Jackton Distillery is a single malt Scotch whisky distillery in South Lanarkshire, Scotland. The distillery was founded in 2020 by the Kean family and is located on the O'Cathain Farm. It takes its name from the nearby village of Jackton.

The company has released three blended whiskies under the Raer brand. In addition to whisky, the site also produces gin and vodka. As of 2025 it is one of twenty-three malt whisky distilleries in the Scottish Lowlands.

== History ==
The distillery began production in February 2020.

In 2021, Jackton were the first Scotch whisky distillery to fill casks from Chambord, France. The casks were used for whisky and for a barrel-aged gin. In 2023, the distillery partnered with McLean's Gin, a gin producer based in Strathaven, South Lanarkshire, and began to distribute McLean's gins alongside their own.

Prior to 2024 there was no public access to the distillery. In the summer of that year a distillery tour was launched, as well as a bar and overnight accommodation. The following year, the distillery released a range of wine sourced from France, themed around the Auld Alliance, alongside a wine tasting experience.

== Production ==
The production site operates a one-ton mash tun and are mashing 4-5 times per week. The fermentation time is 90 hours and both mash tun and washbacks are made of stainless steel. The whisky is matured in oak, sherry, port, rum and various wine casks.

In 2025 the distillery began to operate their own malt house, using 2 five tonne rotating drums. The malt house was opened to the public as part of Glasgow Doors Open Days 2025. As of 2026 the barley is sourced locally, but there are plans to grow barley on the distillery estate.

== Reception & Awards ==
Jackton Distillery won Best Blended Scotch at the Scottish Whisky Awards in 2022 and 2023, and was shortlisted for Distillery of the Year and Tourism Destination of the Year in 2025.
