= Daftmill distillery =

Whisky distillery in Fife, Scotland, UK

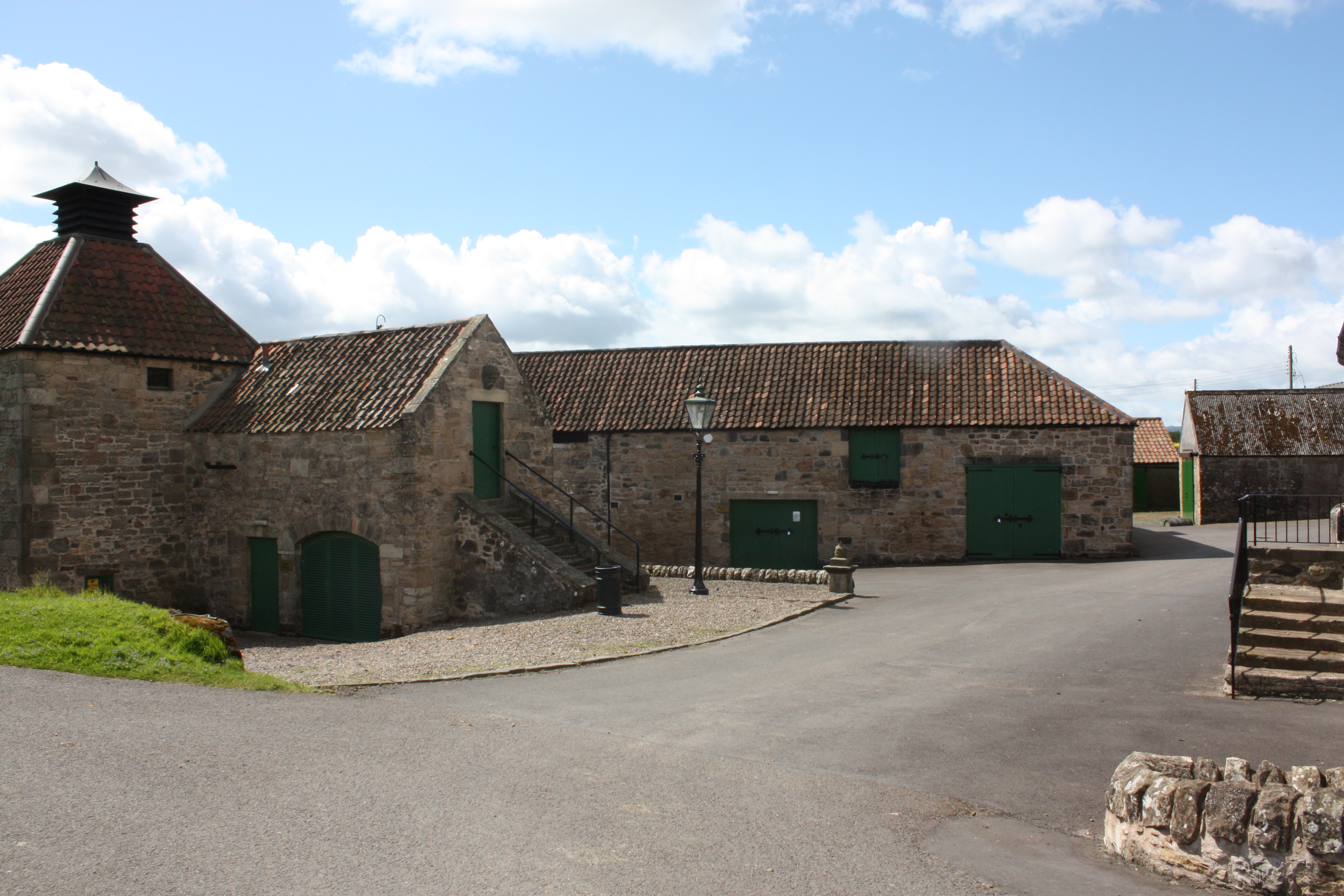

Region: Lowland
- Location: Cupar, Fife
- Coordinates: 56°17′50.10″N 3°06′14.34″W
- Founded: 2005
- Status: Active
- Water source: Cupar / Daftmill spring
- No. of stills: 1 wash still 1 spirit still
- Capacity: 2,500 litre wash still / 1,500 litre spirit still

Daftmill
- Age(s): n/a

Daftmill distillery is a single malt Scotch whisky distillery, located in a converted barn at Daftmill Farm in the Howe of Fife.

The distillery was granted a licence by HMRC in 2005 to produce whisky and the first was produced on 16 December 2005.

Built in a converted meal mill and using un-peated malt, Daftmill has a maximum production capacity of only 20,000 litres of alcohol per year, making it a very low-volume distillery. Its first release was introduced as Daftmill 2005 12–Year Inaugural Release. All the grain used in distillation is produced on the farm.

== See also ==
- Scotch whisky
- Lowland single malts
