= Lochlea distillery =

Scotch whisky distillery in Ayrshire, Scotland

- Location: Ayrshire, Scotland
- Founded: 2018
- Founder: Neil McGeoch
- No. of stills: 1 wash stills 1 spirit stills
- Capacity: 200,000 liters

Lochlea distillery is a Scotch whisky distillery in Ayrshire, Scotland. It produces a Lowland single malt.

== History ==
Lochlea distillery was founded in 2018 by Neil McGeoch, on the farm where the Scottish poet Robert Burns once lived and worked. The £6 million investment was planned back in 2014.

In October 2021, Lochlea launched its inaugural single malt. In May 2023, the distillery launched an cask strength whisky.

In October 2023, Lochlea distillery won International Trade Business of the Year award from the Ayrshire Chamber of Commerce. In January 2025, Lochlea distillery launched the single malt Our Barley, ahead of Burns Night, the annual celebration of the life and poetry of the poet Robert Burns.

In August 2025, Lochlea distillery launched its first permanent whisky core range with three expressions.
