= Alexander Peebles =

New Zealand politician and businessman (1856–1934)

Alexander Peebles (10 January 1856 – 11 April 1934) was a New Zealand carrier, bush contractor, prospector, mine manager, farmer, local politician and businessman. He was born in Kingsbarns, Fife, Scotland in 1856. He became a member of the Coromandel County Council in the 1880s. He joined the Whakatāne Road Board in 1899, and served as the first chairman of the Whakatane County Council from 1900.
