= Lowland single malts =

Region of Scotch whisky production

Scotland's whisky-producing regions

Lowland single malts are single malt whiskies distilled in Scotland's lowlands. The region is home to distilleries such as: Annandale in Annan; Auchentoshan near Clydebank; Bladnoch in Galloway; Daftmill in Fife; The Girvan Distilleries near Girvan; and Glenkinchie distillery near Edinburgh.

Several new distilleries have begun to produce new-make spirit in recent years, including Kingsbarns, InchDairnie and Lindores Abbey, all in Fife, and at Ardgowan.

At least six other lowland single malts are still available, but are no longer distilled: Rosebank (currently undergoing revival), Kinclaith, St. Magdalene, Ladyburn, Inverleven, and Littlemill.

== Lighter flavours ==
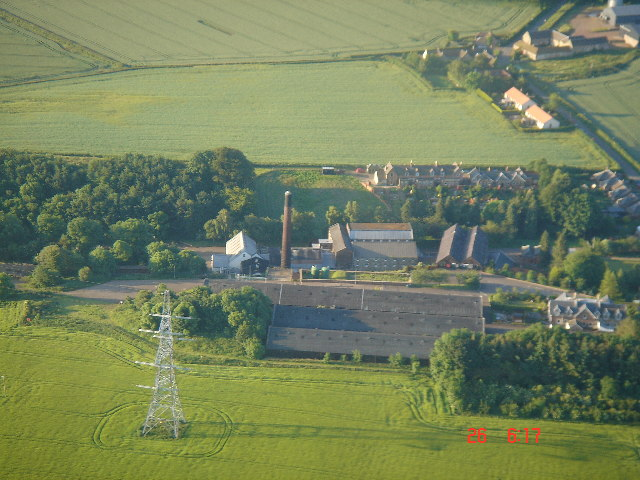
Glenkinchie Distillery (2005)

As a region, the Lowlands have been more strongly associated with grain whisky and blended whisky than malt whisky. Blended whisky often uses a high proportion of Lowland malt, as the less intense flavour profile means it does not dominate the other constituent whiskies.

In terms of Lowlands whisky flavour, the character of the malt often comes through strongly, with a soft body, according to another report. Traditionally the barley used has been unpeated, possibly because the Lowlands, East Lothian in particular, had a strong coal-mining industry.

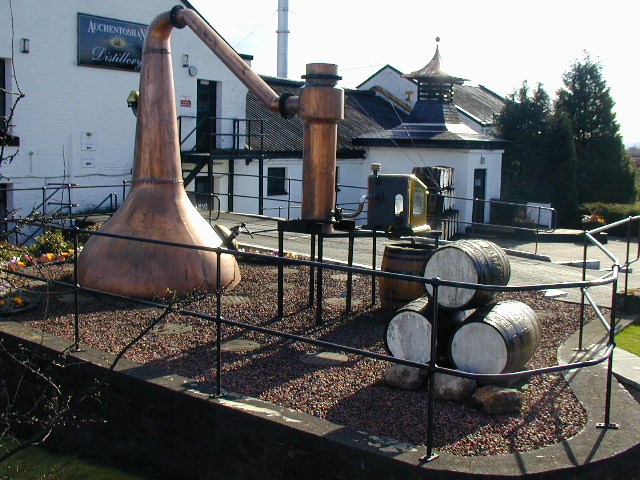
Auchentoshan distillery

Another review states that most of the region's whiskies tend to be "lighter and grassier" without the "smoky" flavour produced by peat.

However, in recent years lowland distilleries such as Ailsa Bay and Annandale have become characterised by their use of peat, with a flavor profile more typical of Islay whisky.

Until 2019, Auchentoshan was the region's only distillery releasing triple distilled malt whisky. More recently, a triple distilled expression has been released by Glasgow Distillery as well.

== Legal status ==
The distinction between the Lowlands and the Highlands was originally drawn by the 1784 Wash Act. Highland distilleries were taxed based upon the size of their still; Lowland distilleries were taxed per gallon in the wash. This led to outrage from Lowland distillers over their comparably high duty rates.

Today the term Lowland is a "protected locality" for Scotch Whisky distilling under UK Government legislation. The modern Lowland–Highland line is drawn by the Scotch Whisky Regulations 2009 as follows:

"the line [begins] at the North Channel and [runs] along the southern foreshore of the Firth of Clyde to Greenock, and from there to Cardross Station, then eastwards in a straight line to the summit of Earl’s Seat in the Campsie Fells, and then eastwards in a straight line to the Wallace Monument, and from there eastwards along the line of the B998 and A91 roads until the A91 meets the M90 road at Milnathort, and then along the M90 northwards until the Bridge of Earn, and then along the River Earn until its confluence with the River Tay, and then along the southern foreshore of that river and the Firth of Tay until it comes to the North Sea."

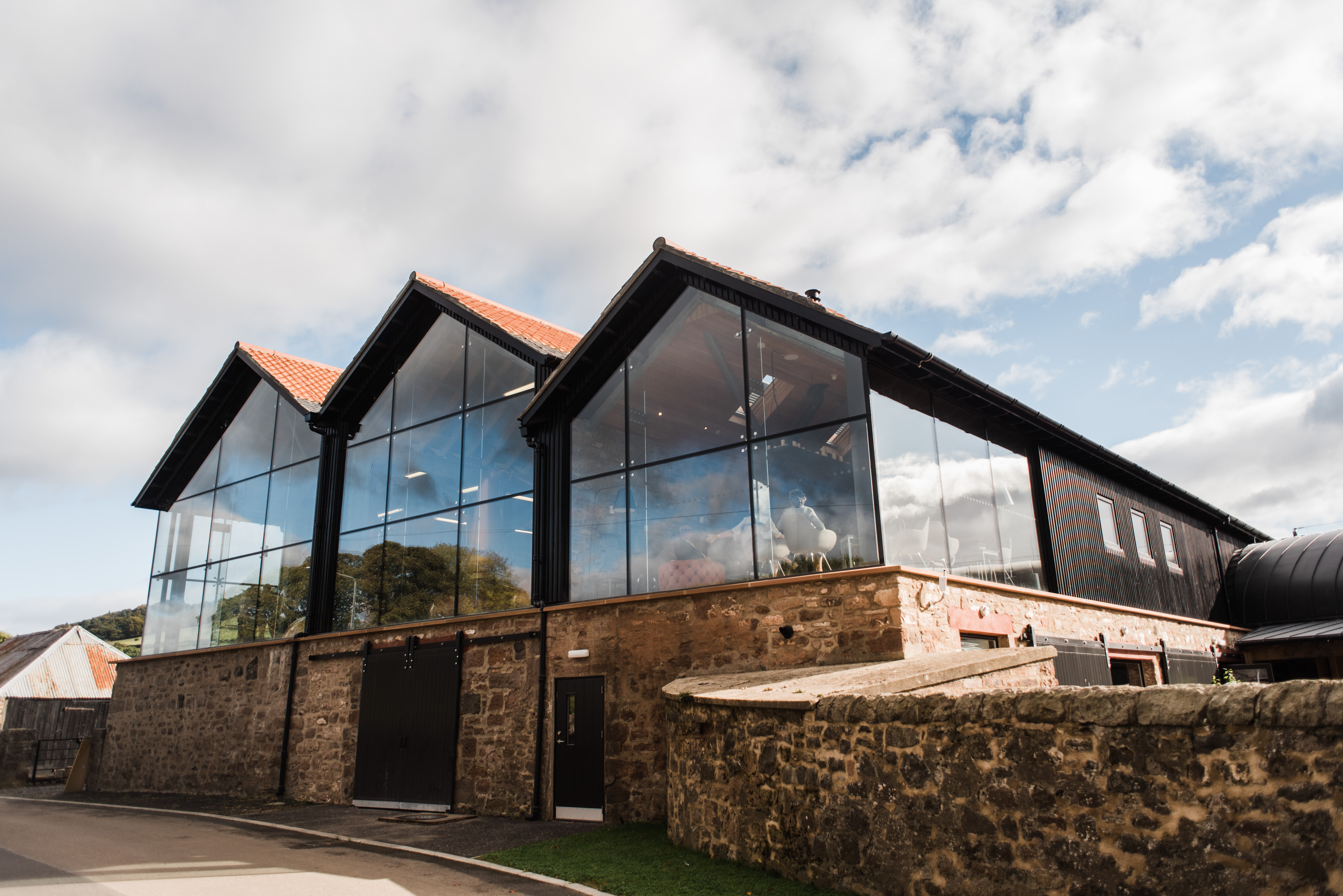
Lindores Abbey Distillery which opened in October 2016

This line is distinct from the geological Highland Fault line to the north. If the geological line were used, several Highland distilleries would become Lowland ones, including Loch Lomond and Fettercairn. According to Visit Scotland, the Lowlands region covers "much of the Central Belt and the South of Scotland including Edinburgh & The Lothians, Glasgow & The Clyde Valley, the Kingdom of Fife, Ayrshire, Dumfries & Galloway and the Scottish Borders". There were 18 distilleries in the region as of 2019, including some that opened quite recently, such as Lindores Abbey, Clydeside and Glasgow.

== List of Lowland single malt distilleries ==
=== Active ===
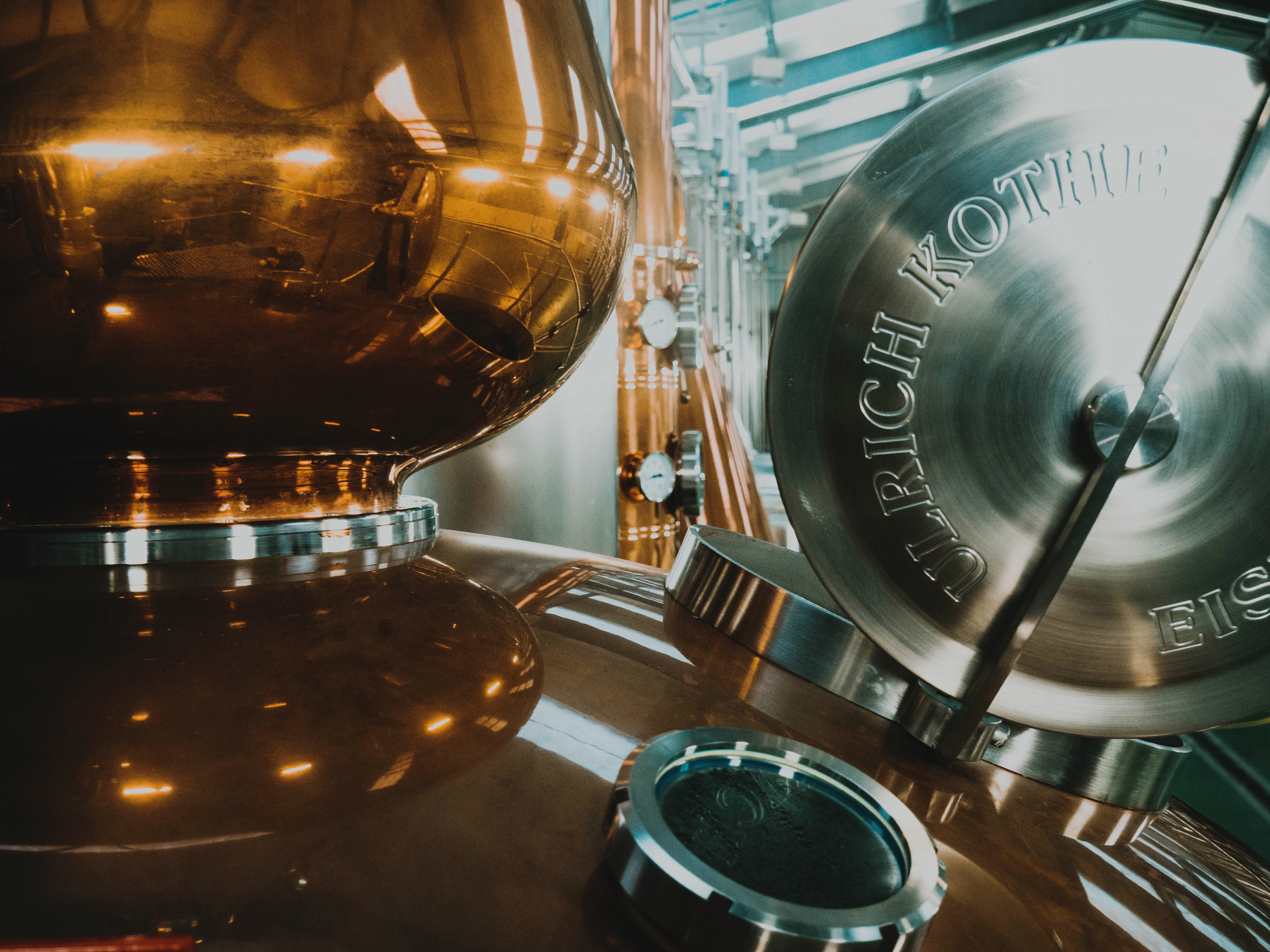
Jackton Distillery's copper pot still, typical of the style used in Lowland single malt production

- Ailsa Bay
- Annandale
- Ardgowan
- Auchentoshan
- Bladnoch
- Bonnington
- Borders
- Clydeside
- Daftmill
- Eden Mill
- Falkirk
- Glasgow 1770
- Glenkinchie
- Holyrood
- InchDairnie
- Jackton
- Kingsbarns
- Lagg
- Lindores Abbey
- Lochlea
- Moffat
- Port of Leith
- Rosebank

=== In development ===
- Burnbrae
- The Clutha

=== Closed or demolished ===
- Inverleven
- Littlemill
  - Bottlings of Littlemill are periodically released by the Loch Lomond Group, who took on ownership of the distillery shortly before its closure.
- Lochrin
- St. Magdalene
