= Annandale distillery =

Whisky distillery in Dumfries and Galloway, Scotland

Coordinates: 55.001681°N 3.255708°W

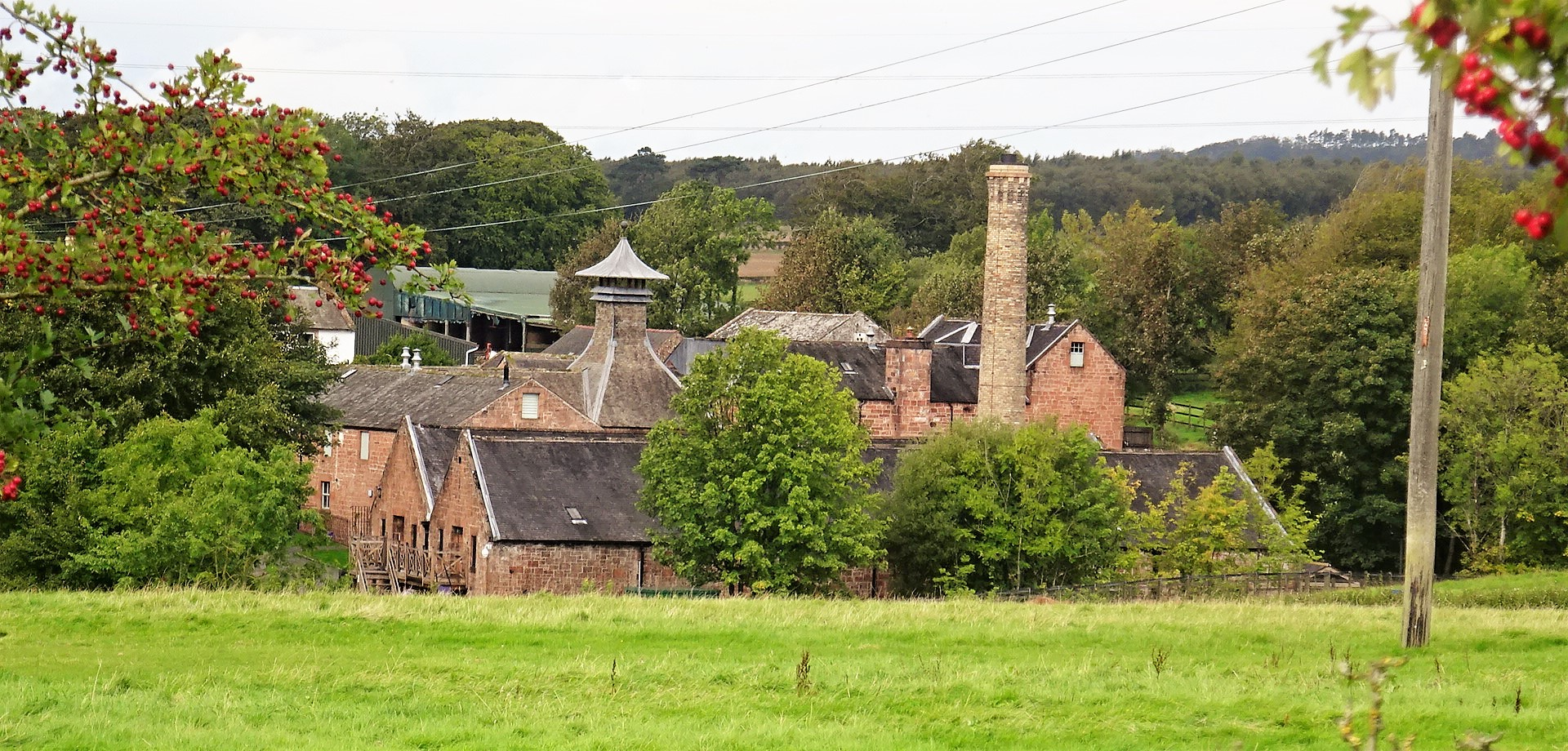
- Annandale Distillery

Region: Lowland
- Location: Annandale, Dumfries and Galloway
- Owner: Annandale Distillery Company
- Founded: 1836
- Status: Active
- Water source: Bore Hole on site
- No. of stills: 1 wash still 2 spirit stills
- Capacity: 260,000 L
- Website: https://www.annandaledistillery.com/

Annandale distillery is a whisky distillery producing single malt Scotch whisky in Annan, Dumfries and Galloway, Scotland.

== History ==
Annandale Distillery was established in 1836 by George Donald and was later bought by Johnnie Walker and Son in 1893. It was closed down in 1924 but was very well preserved.

In 2007 the distillery was bought by the Annandale Distillery Company which is owned by David Thomson and Teresa Church. In 2008, the company received a grant of £150,000 from the Regional Selective Assistance (RSA) support as part of a £10.5m investment which will employ up to 29 people.

In November 2014, the Annandale Visitor Centre opened and the first casks were distilled. The first cask of unpeated whisky made the news and was put up for sale for £1million. The first cask of peated whisky 'Cask 40' was filled by ex- Scotland Rugby Union player Doddie Weir. Doddie was invited to do this after unwittingly becoming involved in the restoration of Annandale distillery by the distillery's rugby fan owner David Thomson.

In November 2017, the first cask was broached, by the two owners David and Teresa. And in December of the same year Doddie Weir returned to broach the first peated cask. 99 of the bottles from the first ever peated cask were sold and auctioned off to raise money for Doddie Weir's charity the My Name'5 Doddie Foundation to help people with motor neuron disease and to hopefully find a cure. And in July 2019 the distillery handed over a cheque to Doddie for £27,800 from the money raised from the bottles.

In June 2018 Annandale distillery released their first release, twenty 2014 production casks were selected for bottling. Annandale Distillery's single cask, single malt scotch whiskies are branded as (unpeated) Man O' Words named after Robert Burns the once local exciseman in Annan and 'Scotland's national poet' and (peated) Man O' Sword named after King Robert The Bruce the former 7th Lord of Annandale and King of Scots, who once had a motte and bailey castle local to the distillery.

In September 2018, four more casks were selected to be bottled. These were two 2015 first fill Bourbon casks (peated and unpeated) and two authentic Oloroso Spanish Oak Sherry casks (peated and unpeated). All four were selected by the late Dr Jim Swan. The bottles from these casks were released in late November 2018, under the same Man O' Sword and Man O' Words Trademark made famous by Annandale's inaugural first release earlier the same year.

Released in July 2019 is the Outlaw King Blended Scotch whisky in dedicated to the film of the same name. Outlaw King celebrates Robert the Bruce, King of Scotland, 7th Lord of Annandale and tells the harrowing but inspiring tale of Bruce's struggle to lead the Scotland's freedom in the 14th century leading up to the Battle of Bannockburn This is the first blend to have any Annandale whisky in it.

Single Cask Single Malt bottlings continue at Annandale Distillery with a strong ethos of the more obscure casks with their Founders' Selection range a range of bottlings hand selected by co-owner Prof. David Thomson. Beginning with Sherry-Conditioned Hogshead Casks in December 2019 which sold out within a few months, and the current release the STR(shaved, toasted & re-charred). The original casks were selected prior to filling by the 'Einsten of Whisky' Dr.Jim Swan before his untimely death in 2017

Onwards from the new bottlings Casks have been the priority at Annandale distillery, now providing two ways to buy and the widest range in Scotland and being one of only a few distilleries in Scotland that allow you to buy a cask of your own Whisky

With the inevitable growth of Annandale distillery has come accolades, they have won the Jim Murray Best Single Cask Single Malt 10 years and Under for both the Man O' Sword and Man O' Words 2015 Vintage Bourbon Cask releases and the visitor centre won a 5 star status from VisitScotland.

== The Globe Inn ==
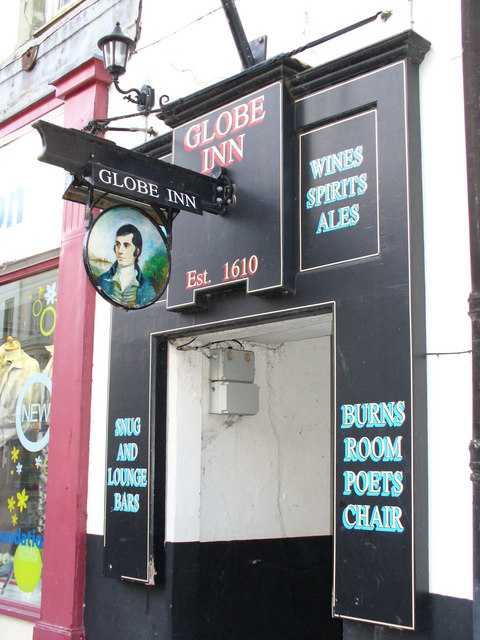
The Globe Inn

Annandale Distillery has also expanded its operation into the surrounding area, they now own and operate The Globe Inn in Dumfries. A pub/restaurant associated with the poet Robert Burns. The Globe is full of Burnsian artefacts and it is fully endorsed by the Robert Burns World Federation where Distillery and Globe Inn co-owner Prof. David Thomson is an Ambassador

== See also ==
- Scotch whisky
- Lowland single malts
- List of whisky distilleries in Scotland
