= Adam Dawson (distiller) =

British politician (1793-1873)

- Born: Adam Dawson; January 27, 1793; Bonnytoun, Linlithgow, West Lothian, Scotland
- Died: October 1, 1873 (aged 80); Linlithgow, West Lothian, Scotland
- Resting place: St Michael’s Churchyard (south-east outer corner), Linlithgow
- Occupations: Distiller, industrialist, politician
- Known for: Owner of St Magdalene Distillery; long-serving Provost of Linlithgow
- Spouse: Helen Ramage

Adam Dawson (27 January 1793 – 1 October 1873) was a Provost of Linlithgow, West Lothian, Scotland and owner of St Magdalene Distillery in Linlithgow.

== Background ==
Dawson was born at Bonnytoun, Linlithgow, on 27 January 1793, the son of Frances McKell or Meikel (married 1783) and Adam Dawson (1747–1836), a distiller.

== Career ==
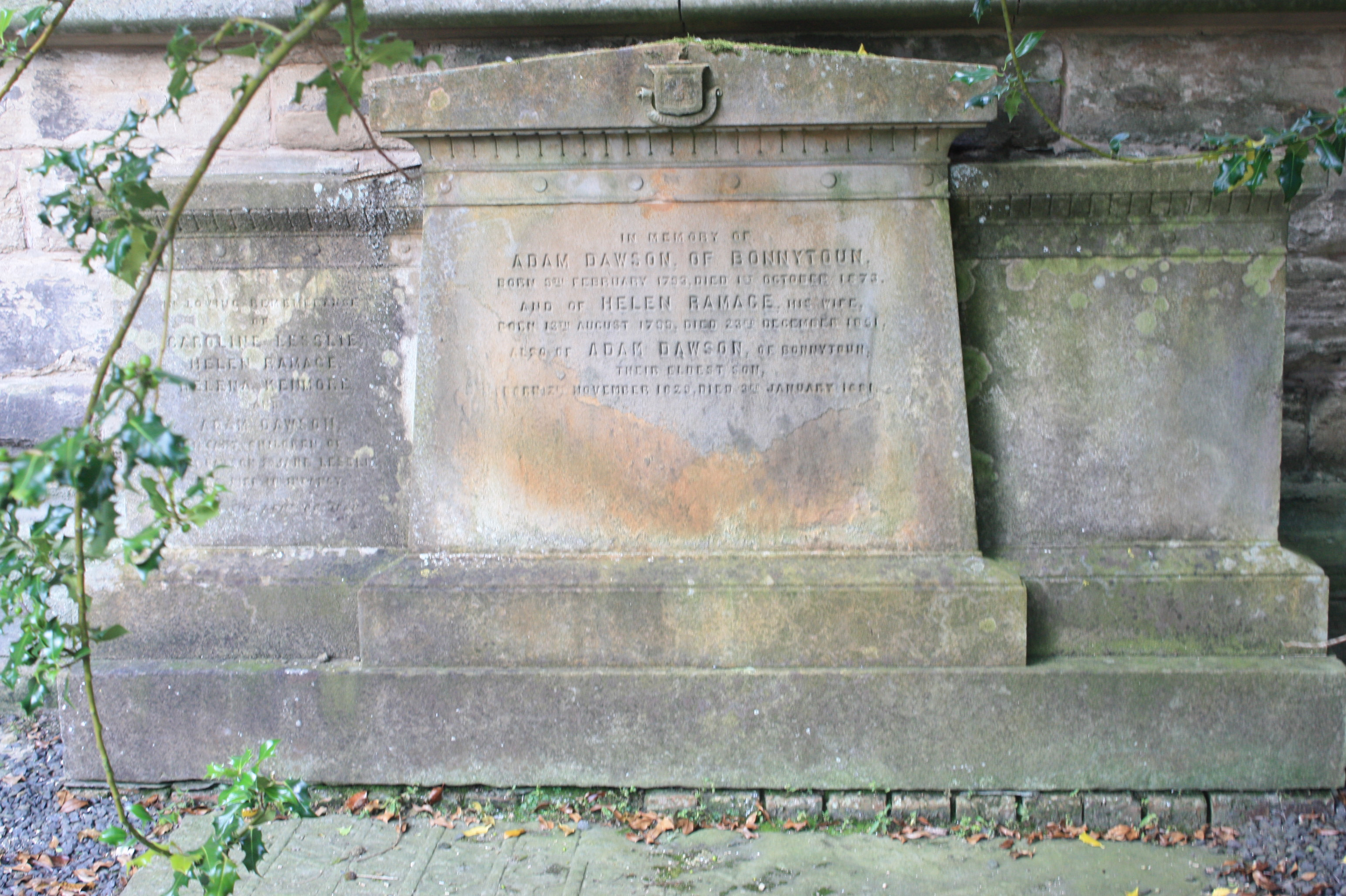
The grave of Adam Dawson, St Michael's churchyard, Linlithgow

He was educated at the University of Edinburgh and was in many ways a busy man despite being subject to severe rheumatism through all his life. Occupying the position of a country gentleman he farmed his own land. A keen politician, he interested himself in all public affairs in his county; he was for nearly 20 years Provost of the burgh of Linlithgow (1830–1848), an office which his father had held before him, in which his brother succeeded him, and which his eldest son also held. He took an active part in the business of the firm of A & J Dawson of St Magdalene Distillery, of which he was a principal partner.

In politics he was an earnest and consistent Whig. He was a keen supporter of Distillers in Scotland and had an interview with Sir Charles Wood, Chancellor of the Exchequer, at Downing Street to support Scotch Distillers. He held the Chief Magistracy of Linlithgow, JP and was instrumental in the rebuilding of the Burgh Halls, Linlithgow, following a fire, which is commemorated by an inscription above the Burgh Halls, "Destroyed by fire 1847 restored 1848 Adam Dawson of Bonnytoun Provost".

Dawson published a series of letters in the Falkirk Herald which he called "Rambling Recollections of Past Times" and which were afterwards reprinted for private circulation.

He initially lived at Bonnytoun Farm House, (now a listed building) and in the 1840s he built Bonnytoun House, a Tudor style house attributed to Thomas Hamilton. The house with its walled garden is protected as a category B listed building. Following Dawson's death in 1873, the 493 acres (200 ha) estate of Bonnytoun was sold to Robert Meikel, a wood merchant from Glasgow, for £20,000.

He is buried on the south-east outer corner of St Michael's Church in Linlithgow with his wife, Helen Ramage.
