= Ardgowan distillery =

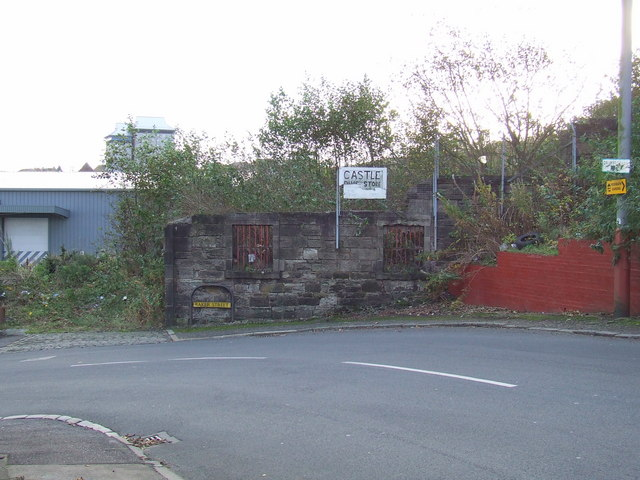
- Remains of the first Ardgowan Distillery building, with bars still in Baker Street.

Region: Lowland
- Location: Inverkip, Scotland, UK
- Founded: 1896 (original distillery); 2016 (modern distillery)
- Status: Active

Ardgowan distillery is a Lowland single malt Scotch whisky distillery in Ardgowan Estate near Inverkip, Scotland.

== History ==
=== First distillery ===
The original Ardgowan distillery was founded in 1896 and located in Greenock at the head of Baker Street just before the railway crossing.

In 1903 the distillery caught fire and a "river of flaming whisky" washed down Baker Street. The flames in the flood were reported to be seven feet high.

Before World War II the distillery was converted to make industrial alcohol that were used in fuel for RAF fighter planes. The distillery was as almost totally destroyed in the Greenock Blitz of 7 May 1941.

The distillery was rebuilt and continued to work until It finally ceased production in 1952.

=== New distillery ===
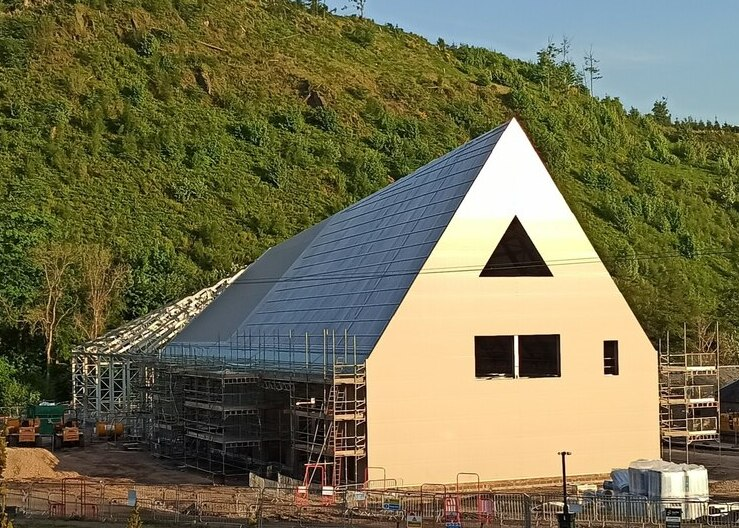

In March 2017, plans for a new £12 million distillery and visitor centre to be built on the Ardgowan Estate near Inverkip were approved by Inverclyde Council. The plans were submitted by the Ardgowan Distillery Company.

In March 2023, Ardgowan spent £100m on Sherry casks to be used in the new distillery.

In November 2023, work begun work on the new distillery site with plans to start production in 2024. In April 2025 the distillery announced the appointment of Roland Grain as Chief Executive Officer, and the opening ceremony to be held on 20 June 2025.

In June 2025, the new Ardgowan distillery started production and filled its first cask. In August 2025 it started to offer tours of the distillery.
