= Moneypenny Group =

Telephone answering services company

Coordinates: 53.04700°N 3.01960°W

Callitech Limited

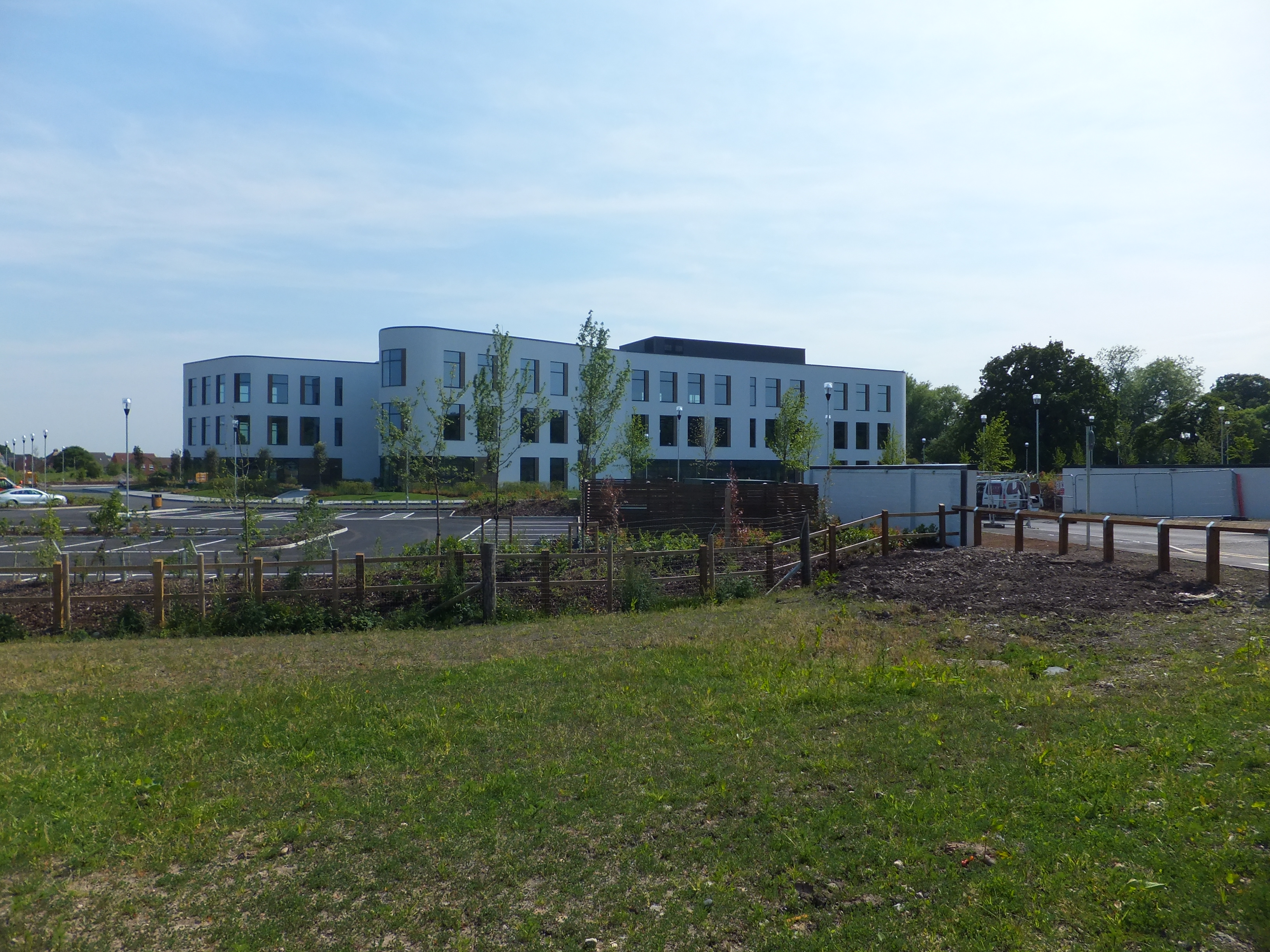
- Moneypenny's headquarters in Wrexham, Wales, United Kingdom
- Trade name: Moneypenny
- Type: Limited
- Industry: Business process outsourcing, Communications
- Founded: 2000 in Wrexham, Wales
- Founder: Rachel Clacher; Ed Reeves
- Headquarters: Wrexham, United Kingdom
- Area served: United Kingdom; United States (from Duluth, Georgia)
- Brands: MadeSimple Group; VoiceNation; Alphapage; Sunshine Communication Services; Choice Voice
- Number of employees: 1,000+ (2025)
- Website: moneypenny.com

Callitech Limited, trading as Moneypenny, is an outsourced communications company, that provides telephone answering services, live chat and digital communication services.

Headquartered in Wrexham, United Kingdom, it operates in the United Kingdom and the United States, with its US operations headquartered in Duluth, Georgia. Its services include telephone answering, live chat, virtual receptionist support, and call tracking. The company serves clients in sectors including legal, property, and healthcare. It supports 16,000 clients and has handled 180+million conversations to date.

== History ==
The company was founded in 2000 by Rachel Clacher and her brother Ed Reeves in Wrexham, United Kingdom. The business was established following observations of limitations in traditional telephone answering services, after Reeves lost a major order when a call was mishandled by a traditional answering service while he was on holiday. The two originally operated the company from a small office above an optician's shop and only had £15,000 in capital. The company was established to provide professional telephone answering services to small and medium-sized businesses. The company shares its name with Miss Moneypenny from the James Bond franchise.

Its initial turnover in 2001 was £115,000, growing to £2.9 million in 2005–2006, to £4.2 million by 2007. It originally had two staff when it was founded in 2000, but expanded to 120 staff by 2007, taking calls for more than 3,000 companies. By 2010, the company moved to Wrexham Technology Park.

In 2025, following historical appointments including: Glenn Jackson as managing director in 2009, and Joanna Swash as CEO in 2017. Jesper With-Fogstrup served as Group Chief Executive Officer until October 2026.

=== US expansion and new UK headquarters ===
Moneypenny expanded internationally in 2011, and opened a new 8,000-square-foot (740 m^{2}) office in the Wrexham Technology Park alongside its existing headquarters in the same year.

In 2013, it opened an office in Takapuna, Auckland, New Zealand, to provide overnight services to UK customers while the Wrexham office was closed overnight. Staff from the Wrexham office were transferred to New Zealand to handle calls during the night shift in the UK. The system of temporarily transferring UK workers to work in New Zealand was due to higher demand for overnight calls in the UK, and most staff refusing to work nights, but more than 40 staff were interested in working abroad instead. The company said they resisted introducing out-of-hours night shifts in the UK due to the effects it may have on staff health, attitude and customer service. The scheme was well-received by staff, but to a mixed response on social media. It lasted six months until the staff were replaced in New Zealand.

In 2014, Clacher reduced her role in the company and set up the Moneypenny Foundation, centred on providing work experiences to less-fortunate young people. The charitable foundation is funded by Moneypenny, and operated offices in Wrexham, other sites in Wales, and in Liverpool, England. It was renamed to "We Mind the Gap" in August 2017.

Moneypenny announced it would be opening a U.S. office in Charleston, South Carolina, in 2015. By 2015, the company had 400 staff in Wales (United Kingdom), New Zealand and the United States.

In 2016, the company fully moved to and opened a new headquarters facility in Wrexham. It contains a pub, gym, treehouse and garden footpath on a £15 million 91,000-square-foot (8,500 m^{2}) site, and was designed using ideas raised by the company's staff. The building was officially opened by Charles, Prince of Wales in July 2017. The company's turnover increased to £18 million in 2016.

Moneypenny acquired United States-based services VoiceNation and Ninja Number in 2020 and Sunshine Communications in 2024. During the COVID-19 pandemic the company saw an increase in phone calls by 20% and hired employees from the hospitality and travel sectors, both heavily impacted by the pandemic. Also during the pandemic in 2020, the company offered its Digital Switchboard service for free to help companies cover any reception staff unable to come to work or were self-isolating.

In 2025, as part of its 25th anniversary, Moneypenny unified all its US brands—including VoiceNation, Alphapage, Sunshine Communication Services, and Choice Voice—under the single Moneypenny name.

== Operations ==
Moneypenny expanded its service providing telephone answering to include live chat, digital messaging and technology-enabled customer communications. The company grew through extending its operations internationally, particularly into North America. By the 2010s, Moneypenny had established in both the UK and the United States.

As part of its international growth, Moneypenny has completed several acquisitions, particularly in the United States, to expand its North American presence. The major acquisitions are Companies MadeSimple, VoiceNation, Ninja Number, Alphapage, and Sunshine Comms. As of 2025, Moneypenny employs over 1,000 people across its locations. The company has offices in Wrexham (UK), Charleston (South Carolina), and Atlanta (Georgia).

Its initial turnover in 2001 was £115,000, with it increased to £18 million in 2016.

In 2017, the company handled 40,000 global calls daily, and had 10,000 clients, ranging from individual plumbers to legal firms, with Moneypenny stating they have served 1 in 4 of the top 200 London firms. They stated their biggest customers were from the automotive, law and property sectors, with Mitsubishi and Mazda, two companies named as some of Moneypenny's biggest customers. Moneypenny has provided these companies remote assistants, who can handle email monitoring, social media minding services, switchboard operations. Staff may be specialised, such as to the legal or property sector, or are generalist. Their staff are also tasked with handling "overflow" calls, when a company's in-house system cannot cope, or handle "occasional disasters" on behalf of a company. At the time, their personal assistants were typically young and female, with 31 being the average age, although there has been an increase in male applicants.

As of 2020, it has handled 15 million calls and chats each year with 13,000 clients in the United Kingdom and the United States. Lloyds Development Capital described it as the "largest answering service in the UK".

== Moneypenny Foundation ==
In 2014, Rachel Clacher, co-founder of Moneypenny, launched a pilot program that led to the establishment of the Moneypenny Foundation. A charitable initiative funded by the company to provide work experiences and training opportunities for disadvantaged young people, particularly those from care backgrounds or homeless hostels, in Wrexham and surrounding areas.

By 2015, the Moneypenny Foundation had formalised its operations, delivering its first full six-month program for 10 participants in Wrexham, with expansion to other Welsh sites and Liverpool by 2017. In August 2017, the organisation was renamed WeMindTheGap to better reflect its mission of bridging employment and life gaps for under-served youth aged 16 and above.

== Leadership ==
- Rachel Clacher CBE and Ed Reeves are the co-founder of Moneypenny and they both led the company from 2000 to 2018. Rachel Clacher is the recipient of Commander of the Order of the British Empire (CBE).
- Joanna Knight, was the group CEO of Moneypenny from 2018 to 2025. In 2024, Knight was awarded Order of the British Empire (OBE) for services to business and workplace culture.
- Jesper With-Fogstrup served as Group Chief Executive Officer until October 2026.
- Andrew Collis is the Chief Financial Officer at Moneypenny. He serves on Forbes Business Councils. Eric Schurke is the CEO of Moneypenny in the US and serves of the Fast Company Business Council.

== Footnotes ==
- Case Study - Moneypenny
- Moneypenny bonds with its customers
- Insight Report-Small changes stack up: an accountant's guide to a brilliant website
- 1,000-strong customer conversations
