= Monypenny =

Monypenny is a surname. Notable people with the surname include:

- Charlton Monypenny (1864–1947), 27th Laird of Pitmilly and sprinter
- Dominic Monypenny (born 1960) Australian Paralympian
- Douglas Monypenny (1878–1900) Scottish international rugby union player
- William Flavelle Monypenny (1866–1912), British journalist
- William Monypenny (American football) (fl. from 1926), American football and basketball coach

== See also ==
- Moneypenny (disambiguation)
