= St Magdalene distillery =

Whisky distillery in West Lothian, Scotland

Coordinates: 55°58′35″N 3°35′29″W

St. Magdalene distillery
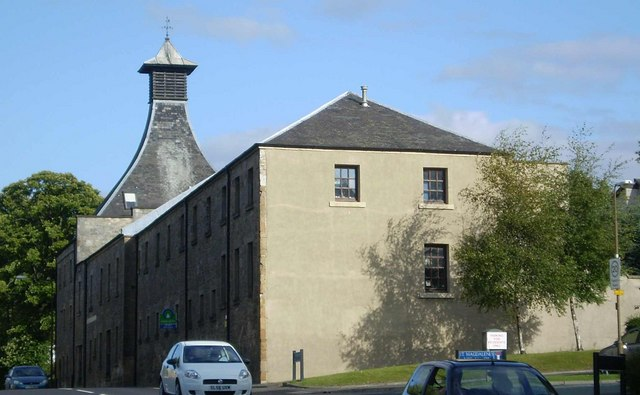
- St. Magdalene distillery buildings converted into apartments

Region: Lowland
- Location: Linlithgow, Scotland
- Owner: Diageo
- Founded: 1798
- Status: Closed/buildings were converted into apartments
- Water source: Loch Lomond
- No. of stills: 1 wash, 1 spirit

St. Magdalene distillery was a Lowland single malt Scotch whisky distillery in Linlithgow, Scotland.

It operated between 1798 and 1983. The former distillery buildings were converted into apartments.

== History ==
St. Magdalene was established at least by 1798 (and possibly as early as 1765). During its early life, it was known as "Linlithgow" after the town in which it was built, and was originally located at Bonnytoun. It moved to the St. Magdalene site in 1834, to be close to the Union Canal. Before the distillery existed, the site was home to a leper colony, convent, and hospital at various points in time between the 12th century and the distillery's 18th-century founding. The distillery took its name from St Magdalene's Hospital, a lazar house which once stood upon the site.

For the majority of the 19th century the distillery was run by the Dawson family, initially by Adam Dawson (1747–1836), who had trained as a maltster and was the youngest son of a sheep farmer from Kippendavie near Dunblane. Adam Dawson and his wife Frances McKell had ten children, including James Dawson the prominent champion of Aboriginal interests. Another son, John Dawson (1796–1878), continued the distillery business along with his brother Adam Dawson Jnr (1793–1873). By 1856 the distillery was capable of producing 4,000 US gallons (15,000 L; 3,300 imp gal) of whisky per week, and employed around 30 people. The sale of the distillery to Distillers Company in 1912, was brought about by the untimely death in January 1912 of John Kellie Dawson, son of Adam Dawson Jnr, from meningitis at the age of 43. St. Magdalene was renovated in 1927.

After St. Magdalene closed in 1983, some of the buildings were converted into apartments. They retained their distinctive pagoda roofs, and are protected as category C listed buildings.
