= Joanna Knight =

Joanna Knight (Swash)
- Born: Joanna Kathryn Swash; 9 October 1972 (age 54); Wrexham, Wales
- Occupations: businesswoman, CEO

Joanna Kathryn Knight OBE (born 9 October 1972), also known as Joanna Swash, is a British businesswoman. She is former Group Chief executive officer of Moneypenny, an international business of answering services.

== Early life and career ==
Joanna Kathryn Swash was born in Wrexham, Wales and educated at Alun School, Mold, Flintshire. She started her career as an owner of a small business that sold typewriter ribbons in UK (it failed as the popularity of laser printers rose). In 2005, She joined Moneypenny, a UK-based provider of answering services, as a salesperson, becoming CEO in 2018. Knight led Moneypenny into the US market, securing private equity from ECI Partners and acquiring three US businesses: VoiceNation, Alphapage, and Sunshine Communications.

Knight's straight-talking and open approach earned her a place on Boris Johnson's Prime Minister's Business Council.

Knight is the chairperson of Wrexham Community & Culture Trust, an independent charity based in Wrexham, established with the support of Wrexham County Borough Council. Knight headed a consortium backing an Investment Zone for Flintshire and Wrexham which received UK Government backing worth up to £160 million as well as acted as Chair of the City of Culture 2025 bid.

== In popular culture ==
Knight has featured in several thought leadership books: Celebrity Service by Geoff Ramm, The Nowhere Office by Julia Hobsbawm and Employee Experience by Ben Whitter, and is a regular guest on BBC Radio 5 Live's Wake Up to Money.

== Awards and honours ==
- OBE for services to the economy in the 2024 New Year Honours
- IOD Director of the Year 2022
- CEO of the Year 2021 by Management Today
- Women to Watch 2021 by Cranfield School of Management
