= Auchentoshan distillery =

Whisky distillery in Dalmuir, Scotland

Coordinates: 55.922°N 4.439°W

Auchentoshan
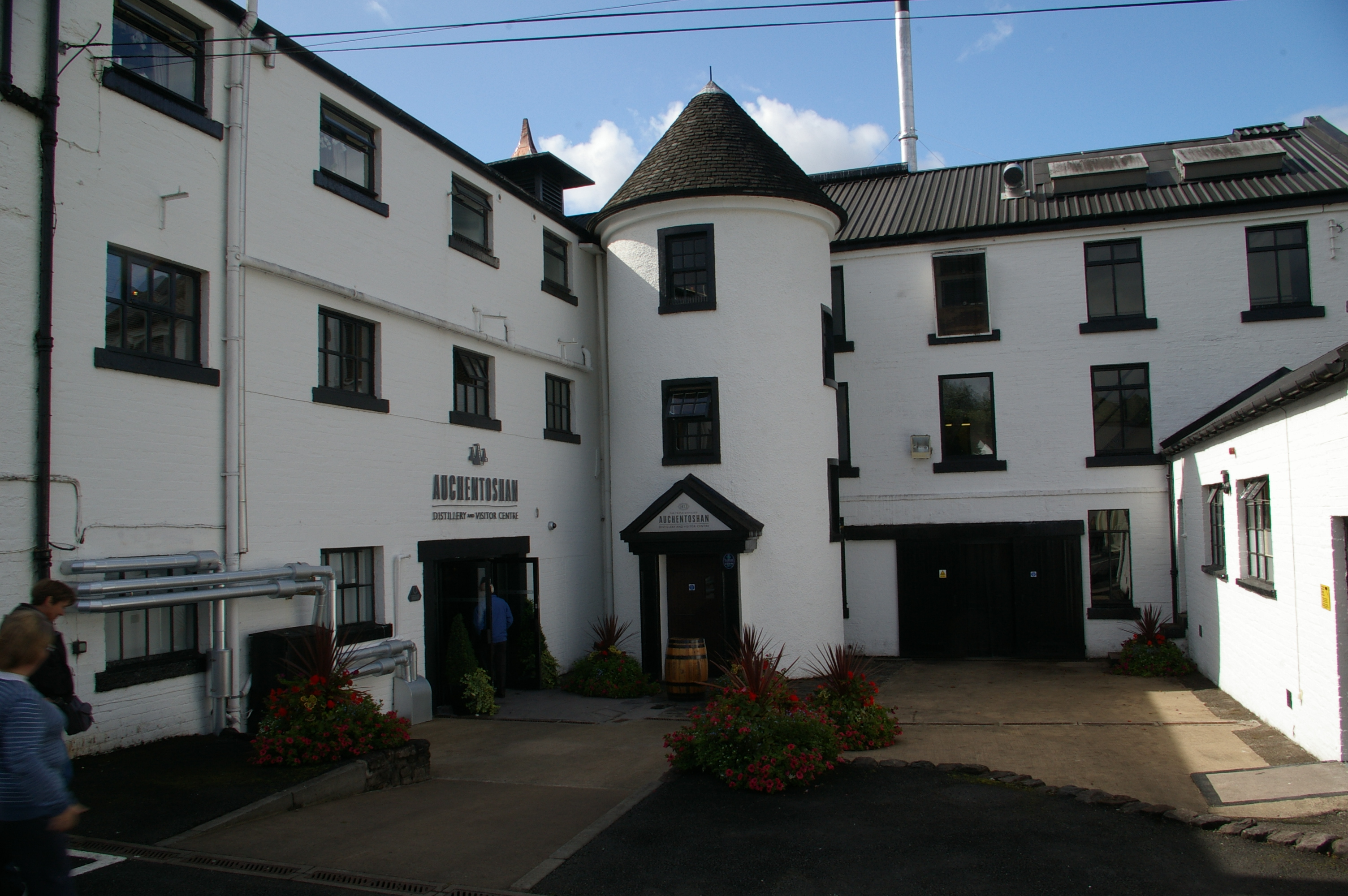

Region: Lowland
- Location: Dalmuir, Scotland
- Owner: Suntory Global Spirits
- Founded: 1823
- Status: Operational
- Water source: Loch Katrine (Production) & Loch Cochno (Cooling)
- No. of stills: 1 wash still 1 middle still 1 spirit still
- Capacity: 1,800,000 litres
- Website: http://www.auchentoshan.com/

Auchentoshan Single Malt
- Type: Single malt
- Age(s): 12 Years; 18 Years; 21 Years
- Cask type(s): 80% refill 20% First fill sherry wood
- ABV: 40% – 43%

Auchentoshan Classic
- Type: Single malt
- Cask type(s): 1st Fill Bourbon Cask
- ABV: 40%

Three Wood
- Type: Single Malt
- Cask type(s): 10 Years matured in American Bourbon with 1 year Oloroso finish and then 1 year Pedro Ximenez finish
- ABV: 43%

Auchentoshan distillery (/ˌoʊxənˈtɒʃən/ OH-khən-TOSH-ən) is a Lowland single malt Scotch whisky distillery in Dalmuir, Scotland.

The name Auchentoshan is from Gaelic Achadh an Oisein (Scottish Gaelic pronunciation: [ˈaxəɣ ən̪ ˈɔʃɛɲ]) and translates as "corner field". The distillery is also known as "Glasgow's Malt Whisky" due to its proximity to Glasgow and "the breakfast whisky" due to its sweet and delicate nature. Auchentoshan is located at the foot of the Kilpatrick Hills on the outskirts of Clydebank in West Dunbartonshire near the Erskine Bridge. As of 2025 it is one of twenty-three malt whisky distilleries in the Scottish Lowlands.

== History ==
The Auchentoshan distillery was built in 1823. The original distillery was built by a corn merchant named John Bulloch and managed with his son. Following their bankruptcy in 1834, the distillery was sold to Alexander Filshie, a local farmer and it remained under control of his family until 1877, following a bad harvest when it was sold again to several owners. In 1877, the distillery was acquired by the Glasgow distillers John & George MacLachlan.

The A82 road outside Auchentoshan was used as a decoy during the Second World War and therefore several distillery warehouses were erroneously struck by the Luftwaffe over the course of the Clydebank Blitz. A bomb crater behind the distillery now acts as a pond for cooling water. The distillery was bought by Eadie Cairns in 1969, who rebuilt it completely. Cairns sold Auchentoshan to whisky blenders Stanley P Morrison (later to become Morrison Bowmore distillers) in 1984.

Suntory invested in Morrison Bowmore in 1989 and in 1994, they acquired 100% of its holdings including Auchentoshan distillery.

In May 2014, Beam Inc. and Suntory Holdings Limited merged to create Suntory Global Spirits, who are now the owners of Auchentoshan and other Morrison Bowmore holdings.

== Production ==
Unusual for a Scottish distillery, Auchentoshan practices triple distillation. The mash tun at the distillery is a modern stainless steel semi-Lauter mash tun, with a copper canopy. Generally the final stage of Scotch whisky production involves distilling the fermented mash in two copper stills. In Auchentoshan, a third still (known as the "Intermediate Still") helps to give a final spirit strength of 81% ABV (162 proof). This triple distillation, in addition to an unpeated malt, gives Auchentoshan a more delicate and sweet flavour than many Scotch whiskies. Maturation is mainly in ex-bourbon barrels and ex-sherry butts, though some Auchentoshans will mature in French wine casks.

Special bottlings are released periodically, including the oldest, a 50-year-old Auchentoshan distilled in 1957 and released in 2008. The distillery has a visitor centre and conference facilities, both completed in 2005, and is open to the public for tours every day of the week.

== Awards and reviews ==
Auchentoshan offerings have performed well at international spirit ratings competitions. Its 16- and 18-year scotches received double gold medals at the 2008 San Francisco World Spirits Competition. The Auchentoshan Three Wood expression won "the best Scotch Whisky and Cigar Combination" in the world when paired with the Bolivar Inmensas.

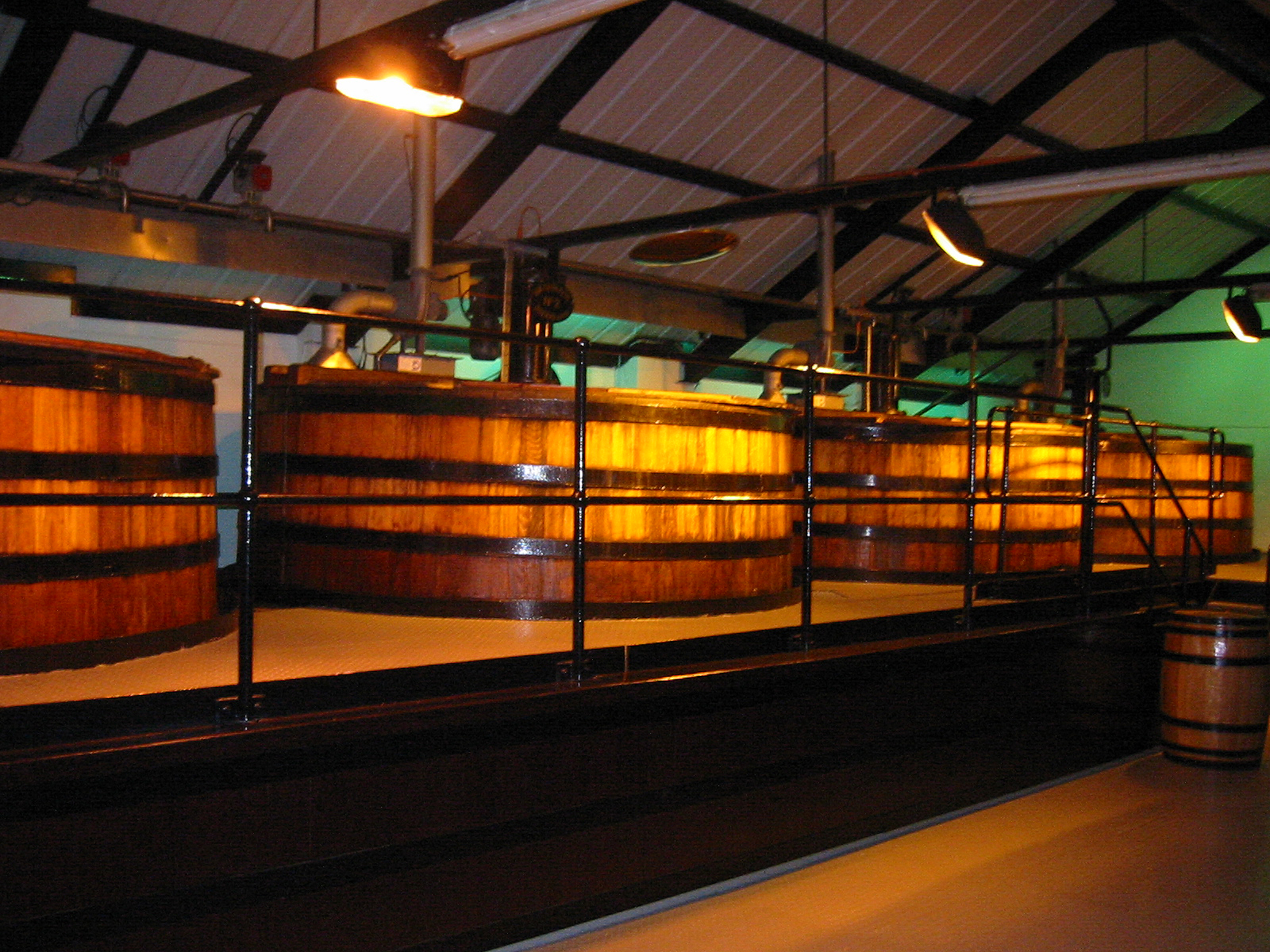
The Fermentation Tanks

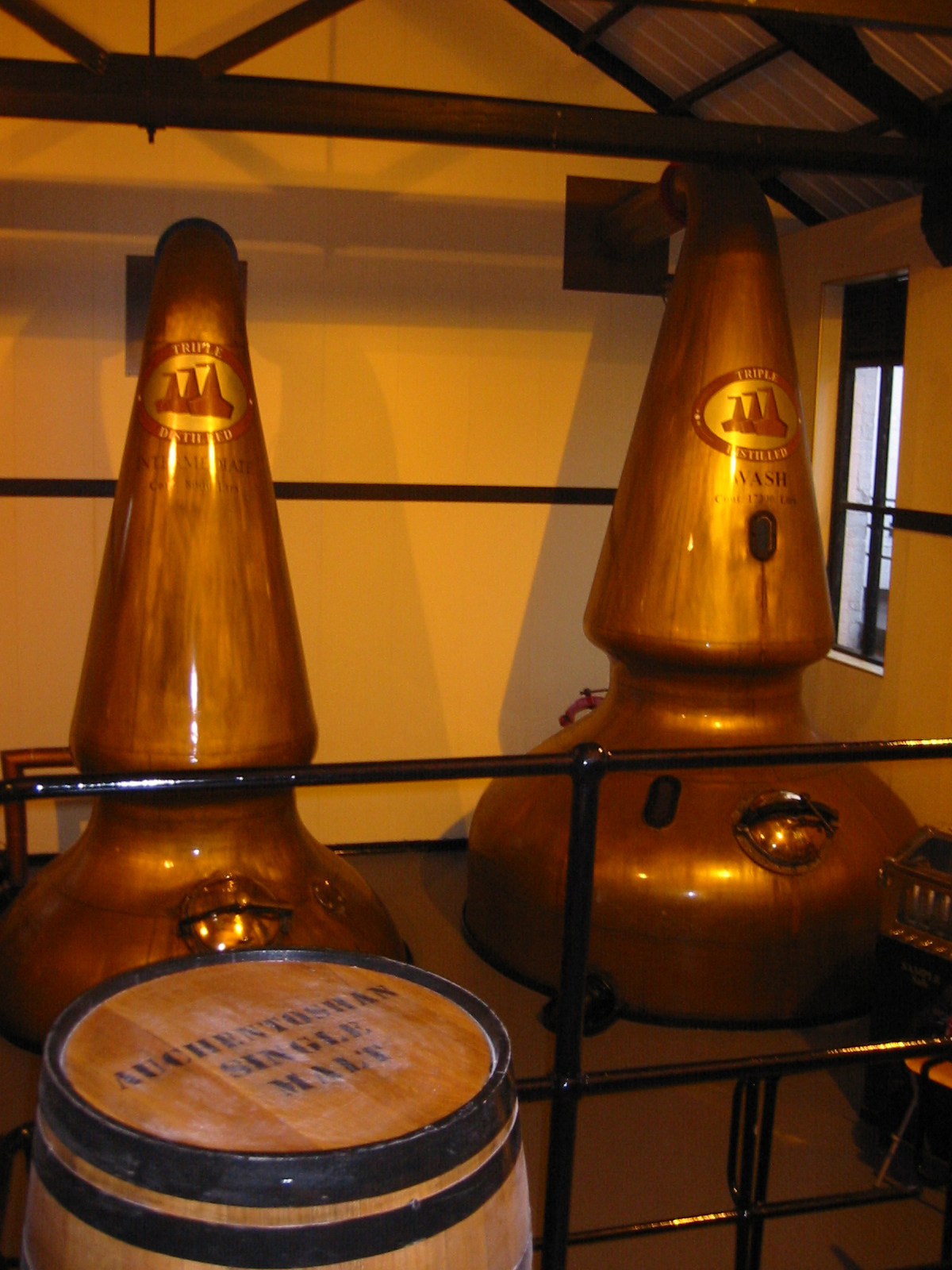
The copper pot stills

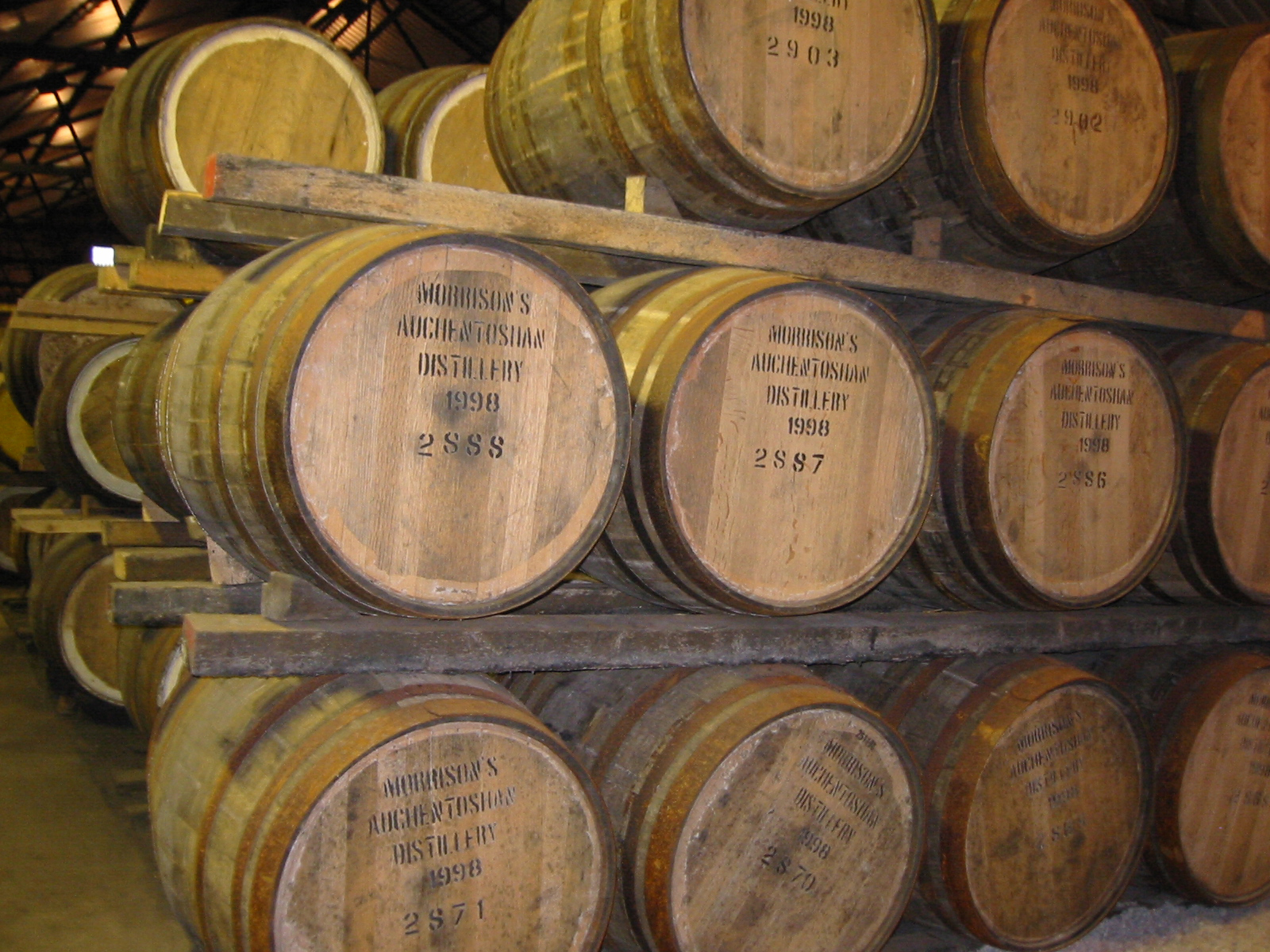
Barrels in Auchentoshan distillery

== See also ==
- Whisky
- Scotch whisky
- List of whisky brands
- List of distilleries in Scotland
