= Iain MacLeod (disambiguation) =

Iain Macleod (1913–1970) was a British politician.

Iain MacLeod or Macleod may also refer to:

- Iain Macleod (lawyer), British lawyer
- Iain Borb MacLeod (1392–1442), Scottish clan chief
- Iain Finlay Macleod (born 1973), Scottish writer
- Iain Ciar MacLeod (1330 – c. 1392), considered to be fourth chief of Clan MacLeod
- Ian Macleod Distillers, owner of the Scotch whisky distilleries Glengoyne, Tamdhu and Rosebank

== See also ==
- Ian McLeod (disambiguation)
- Ian MacLeod (disambiguation)
