= Sheep dip (disambiguation) =

Sheep dip is a liquid formulation used to protect sheep from parasites.

Sheep dip may also refer to:

- a place known as a sheep dip, i.e. a natural environment (e.g. in a stream or river) or man-made structure where sheep are washed
- sheep-dipping, the passing of files through a dedicated computer to test for computer viruses
- sheep-dipping, a military and clandestine services term for feigning non-involvement by having staff officially disaffiliate and operate ostensibly independently
- a brand of Scotch whisky made by Ian Macleod Distillers.
