= Louis Meeus =

Gin distillery in Belgium

Meeus Distillery, in the Belgian municipality of Wijnegem, was founded in 1863. In the early 20th century it grew to become Europe's largest distillery.

== Origins of Distillery Meeus ==
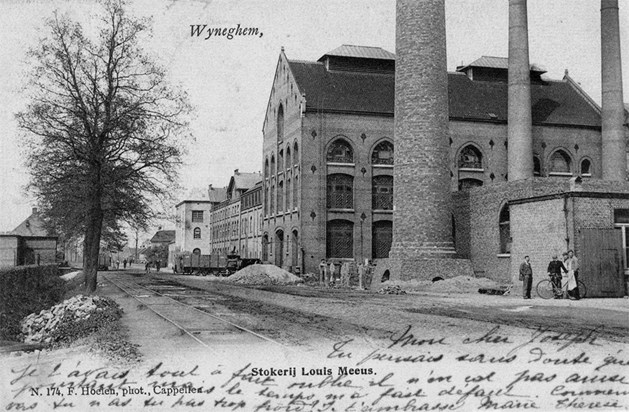
Old site of distillery Meeus

In the 18th century, the Meeus family was already a wealthy entrepreneurial family active in the distilling industry. As a Kempen family, they worked in Antwerp, among other places.

In 1820, Paul Jacques van Reeth founded the distillery De Sleutel (La Clef) in the Lange Winkelstraat in Antwerp. His son-in-law Louis Jean Meeus later took the reins.

When Louis Jean's son, Louis Meeus (1816 – 1903), went looking for a suitable location to grow the company into an industrial distillery, he found one in Wijnegem. The location on the Kempen Canal, with direct access for the supply of raw materials and the transport of the finished jenever, was an important factor in his choice. After the plans had been approved, work started in 1869. By the beginning of the 19th century, the distillery had become one of the largest distilleries in Europe.

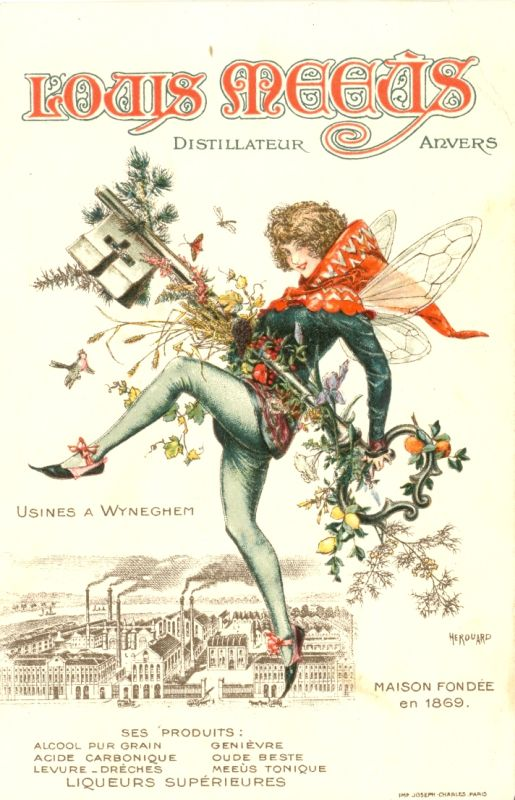
Postcard for distillery Louis Meeus

== 1870-1914: Growth of the company brings prosperity to the village ==
When he founded the distillery, Louis Meeus could count on the help of his three brothers Théophile, Hippolyte and Prosper.

A malt house, office buildings, workers' houses, warehouses and livestock sheds were built alongside the distillery. In 1879 part of the distillery was destroyed by a fire, but this did not stop its growth: in 1884, the first distillery, De Sleutel (La Clef), was joined by a second one, distillery De Pijl (La Flèche). The company meanwhile had twelve grain mills and nineteen fourteen-story grain silos at its disposal. In 1885 the distillery produced 101,359 litres of jenever and employed 200 to 250 people. It was paying one of the highest excise duties applied in Belgium. At the Antwerp International Exhibition (1885), its stand was described as 'l'Arc de Triomphe de la distillerie'. The distillery had an internal rail network (track gauge 600 millimetres), a connection to the local railway line to Turnhout and a connection to the wider rail network via line 205.

When Louis and Théophile died, Prosper withdrew from the distillery (1895). From then on, it was managed by Hippolyte Meeus. Prosper took care of distribution, from the Lange Winkelstraat. At the beginning of the twentieth century, Hippolyte designated his sons Louis and Robert as his right-hand men.

Many of the distillery's workers lived in the surrounding workers' houses. To cater for them and for itself, the distillery not only had its own fire brigade, but also a school, a chapel and a steamboat for sailing on the canal. The distillery gave many of the villagers – and also residents of neighbouring communities – job security. For a long time it also paid the village's municipal taxes. Via political channels, the Meeus brothers also tried to apply their expertise from the distillery to areas of benefit to the municipality, such as traffic infrastructure and fire safety. In recognition of their services, the Meeus brothers were dubbed Knights of the Order of Leopold (Belgium) by the Belgian government.

When Hippolyte Meeus became mayor of Wijnegem (1892–1914) the distillery's economic ties with the municipality of Wijnegem became even stronger. During his mayoralty, he spent a lot of the money he earned from the distillery's prosperity on construction projects in the municipality, such as the building of the community centre ‘t Gasthuis and the town hall.

== World War I: beginning of an end ==
During World War I, the German occupiers removed all the distillery's copper, thus halting production. Moreover, the Meeus family had fled to England, so the business remained closed until 1918 when it was started up again under Louis and Robert Meeus, the sons of Hippolyte. Alcohol consumption was, however, reduced thanks to increasingly high excise duties and the Vandervelde Act of 1919, which prohibited the drinking of spirits in public places. In 1930, the distillery stopped producing alcohol, but the malt house remained active.

== After 1930: from industrial site to housing project ==
When the distillery closed, the company management looked for other options. Liqueur production was transferred to Lange Winkelstraat, in Antwerp. After Robert's death, Frans Hol took over liqueur production (1957), distilling liqueurs in Limburg under the name Bal & Louis Meeùs. The malting plant passed into the hands of Dutch brewery Albert Heineken. In 1980 the Albert Malt House moved to Ruisbroek on the Sea Canal.

On 8 August 1930, 'Semina' ('Société Immobilière et Industrielle Anversoise') was set up in some of the buildings of the former distillery. The other buildings were sold to various companies. Some of the buildings were listed in Wijnegem's cultural heritage inventory.

In 1998 the non-listed buildings on the distillery site were purchased by art dealer Axel Vervoordt. Since 2012 he has owned the entire site and has developed the prestigious 'Kanaal' construction project, with residential, office and arts units. Apartments have been built in the former silos.
