= Langley Maltings =

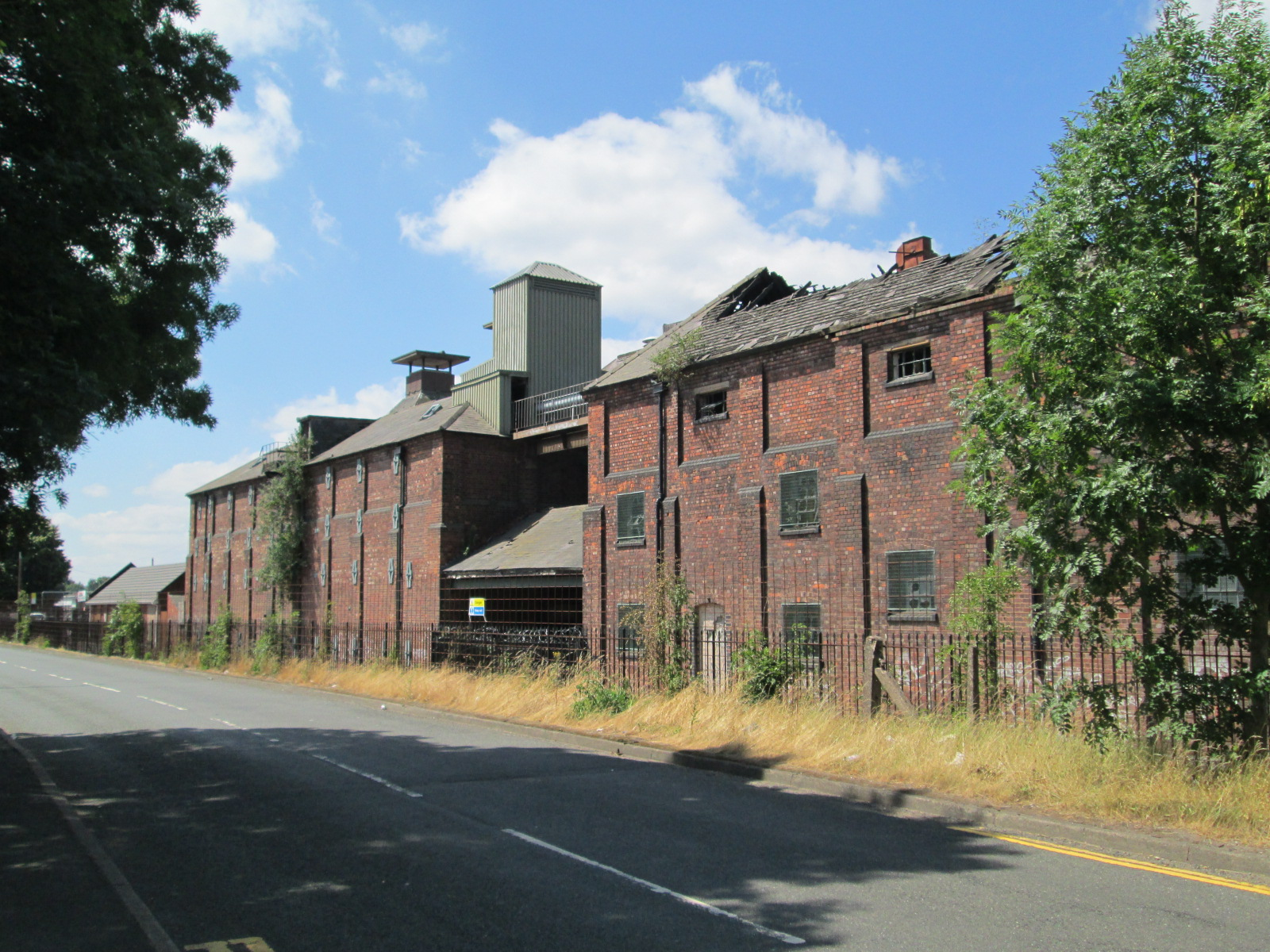
- Viewed from Western Road in 2018
- Interactive map of the Langley Maltings area

General information
- Status: Grade II listed
- Type: Maltings
- Location: Oldbury, West Midlands grid reference SO 996 883
- Coordinates: 52°29′34″N 2°0′26″W
- Opened: 1898
- Closed: 2006

Langley Maltings is a former maltings in Oldbury, West Midlands, England. Built in 1898, it was in operation until 2006. It was damaged by fire in 2009.

It is a Grade II listed building, listed on 18 March 1974. It has been named by the Victorian Society as a heritage building at risk of disrepair.

== History ==
Langley Maltings was built in 1898, replacing a malt house destroyed by fire the previous year. It was designed by Arthur Kinder & Son. It supplied malt to Crosswells Brewery, a short distance away across a railway line; the brewery, established in 1870 by Walter Showell, distributed Showell's Ales throughout the Midlands. The maltings was known as Showell's Maltings.

The building is next to Titford Canal; grain was delivered by canal, and later by rail, a railway siding being built from the main line (now the Birmingham to Worcester via Kidderminster line). After the Second World War grain was delivered by road. There was some rebuilding following a fire in 1925. In 1944 the maltings was bought from Showells by Wolverhampton and Dudley Breweries.

By the end of the 20th century it was one of few such buildings in the country using the traditional floor malting process. Malting came to an end in 2006, and the following year Wolverhampton and Dudley Breweries sold the building.

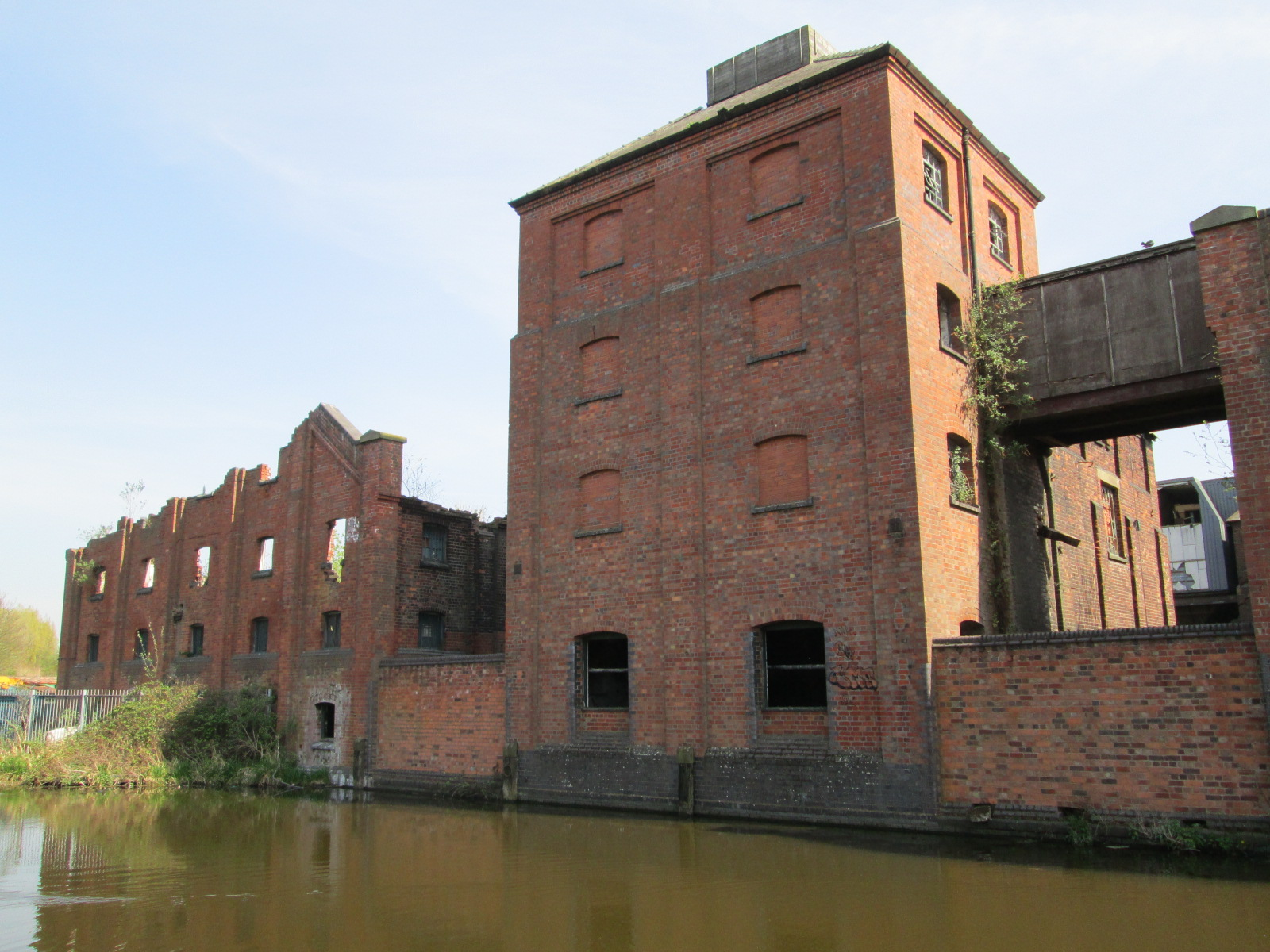
Viewed from the towpath of Titford Canal in 2019

On 8 September 2009 the building was damaged by arson: much of the roof, and three of its outlet towers, were destroyed in the fire.

In 2012 permission to demolish two of three structures, as part of a housing plan, was refused by Sandwell Council. The council report noted that English Heritage, disagreeing with the report by the structural engineers supporting demolition, said that despite some unstable masonry, repairing the building would be relatively straightforward. The council report noted: "The proposed demolition of a large element of the listed building will result in a substantial loss of significance to these historic maltings".

In 2018 the Victorian Society included Langley Maltings on its list of the top ten endangered buildings.
