= Glaswegin =

Gin brand from Glasgow, Scotland

- Type: London dry gin
- Manufacturer: Illicit Spirits Distillery
- Distributor: Courageous Spirits
- Origin: Tradeston, Glasgow, Scotland
- Introduced: 2018
- Alcohol by volume: 41.1% (Original; Tequila Cask); 55.8% (Weegie Strength); 37.5% (Raspberry & Rhubarb)
- Website: glaswegin.com

Glaswegin is a brand of gin distilled in the Tradeston area of Glasgow, Scotland.

== History ==
The company was founded in 2018 by Andy McGeoch, as a reaction to the popularity of Edinburgh Gin in Glasgow. McGeoch had previously been CEO of clothing retailer M&Co. The packaging and distinctive porcelain bottle were designed by Paul Grey of the Glasgow School of Art.

In 2023, Courageous Spirits began to export Glaswegin to Canada. This was the first time the brand had been made available in North America.

In 2024, Glaswegin opened a brand home on Lancefield Street, Finnieston.

== Products ==
The core Glaswegin product is a London dry gin with eight botanicals, including Scottish milk thistle. The gin is contract-distilled on a copper pot still at Illicit Spirits Distillery. Several variations on the core gin have been released, including a raspberry & rhubarb flavour gin, a tequila cask matured gin, and a navy strength gin at 55.8% abv called the "Weegie Strength" edition.

In 2021 the company released King's Inch, an independent bottling of single malt whisky sourced from Glasgow distillery. The project had been assisted by industry expert Jim Swan. An age statement whisky followed in 2024.

== Awards ==
The core Glaswegin was named "Scotland's Best London Dry" at the World Gin Awards 2021.

In 2019, the packaging was awarded at the Scottish Design Awards, and was a finalist in the Drum Design Awards.
