= Dumgoyne =

Volcanic plug and hill in Stirlingshire

Coordinates: 56.01495°N 4.34201°W

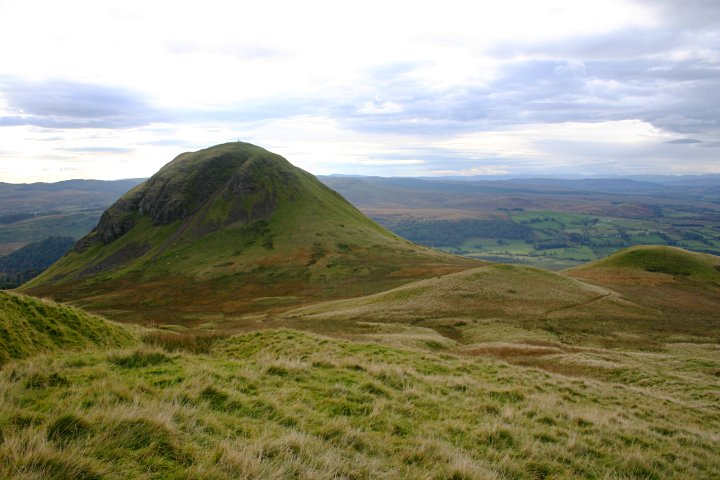
Dumgoyne viewed from the east

Dumgoyne is a hill prominent on the edge of the Campsie Fells and is a well-known landmark visible from Glasgow. It is a volcanic plug and is 427 m (1,401 ft) high. The plug is readily reached from a path beside Glengoyne Distillery or via a water board track from the contiguous villages of Strathblane and Blanefield 3 miles (5 kilometres) to the east, or Killearn to the west.

From Strathblane-Blanefield, the path begins as Campsie Dene Road, which almost immediately becomes a private road after passing between the village's war memorial and the grounds of St. Kessog's Catholic Church. Public parking is not permitted on the private road, but several cars can be parallel parked on the church-side of the road between the main road and the driveway to the church (the Number 10 bus from Glasgow also stops close by), and the walk begins by following this private road for approximately 2 mi (3 km). After passing several gates on the way, turn to the right where there is another gate. Follow this path up and around the side Dumfoyn, and from here the path steepens, as it goes up Dumgoyne. The summit is marked by a small standing stone erected some years ago by local Rotarians. This route to Dumgoyne passes close to the Spittal of Ballewan (545811) the former site of a medieval Knights Templar hospital.

Close to Dumgoyne is Dumfoyn (547825; 421 m (1,381 ft)) a similar but less remarkable and much less climbed hill. From these hills the much smaller but heavily wooded Dumgoyach (531810; 108 m (354 ft)) can be seen. Dumgoyach due to its association with the Edmonstons of Duntreath provides a historic link with Alice Keppel and Queen Camilla.

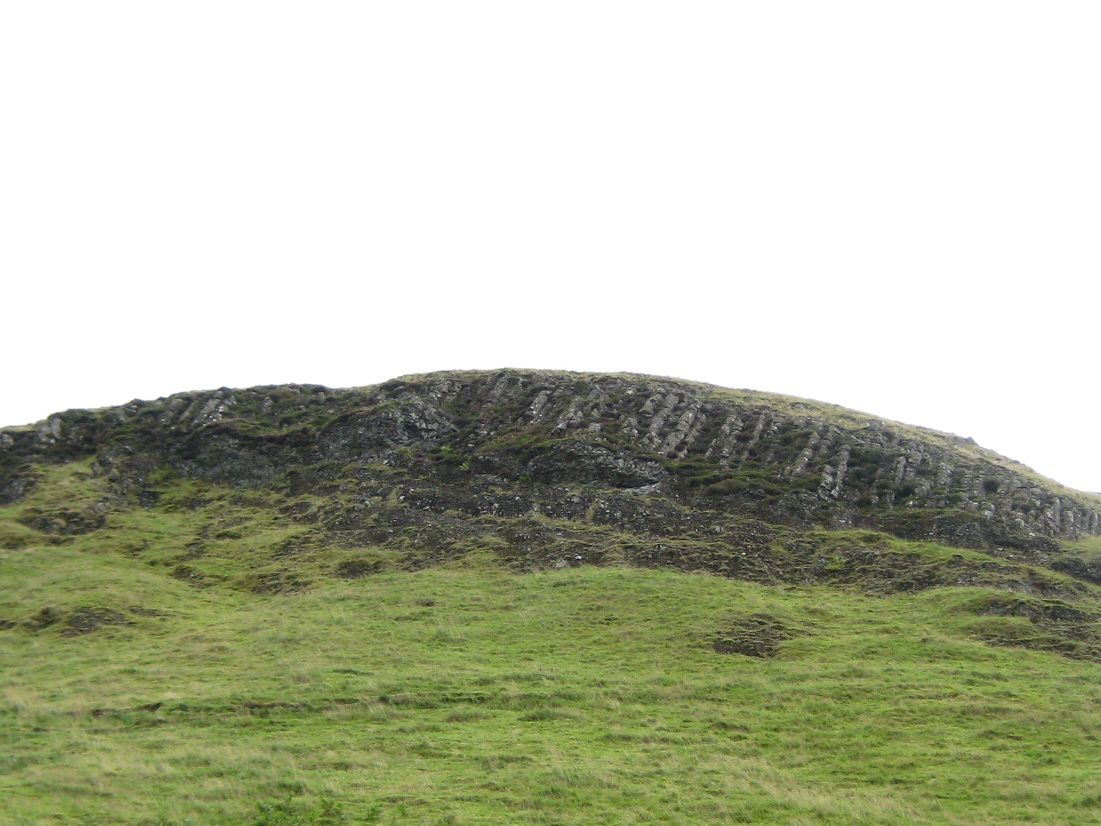
Columnar basalt visible on the west face of Dumgoyne

== Hamlet ==
Dumgoyne is also the name of a nearby hamlet at grid reference NS522834, which is a popular stop for people walking the West Highland Way.
