= Titford Canal =

Canal in the West Midlands, England

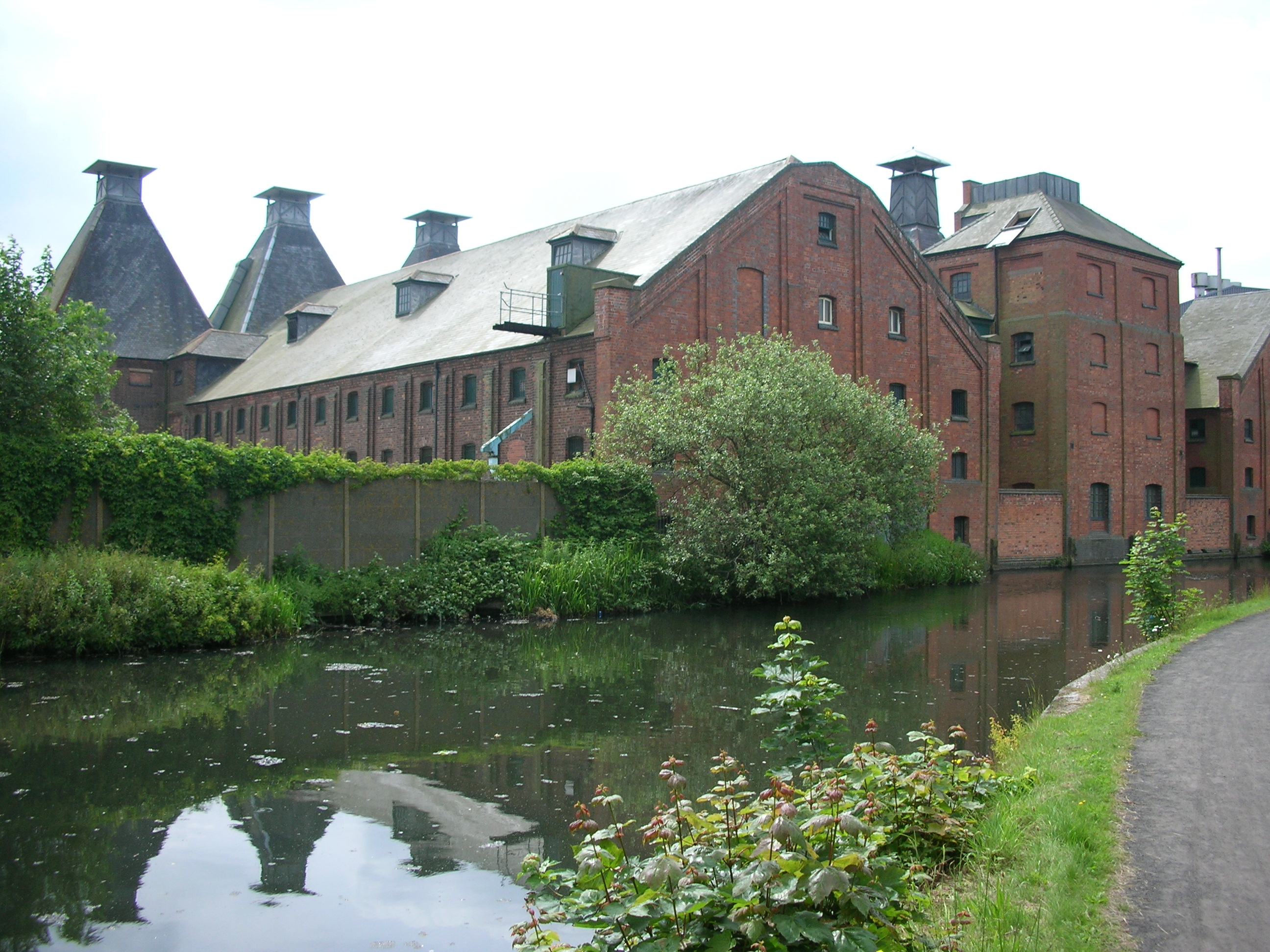
- Langley Maltings before damage by fire, with Titford Canal visible in the front
- Interactive map of Titford Canal

Specifications
- Status: Navigable

History
- Date of act: 1768

Geography
- Connects to: BCN Old Main Line; Titford Pool

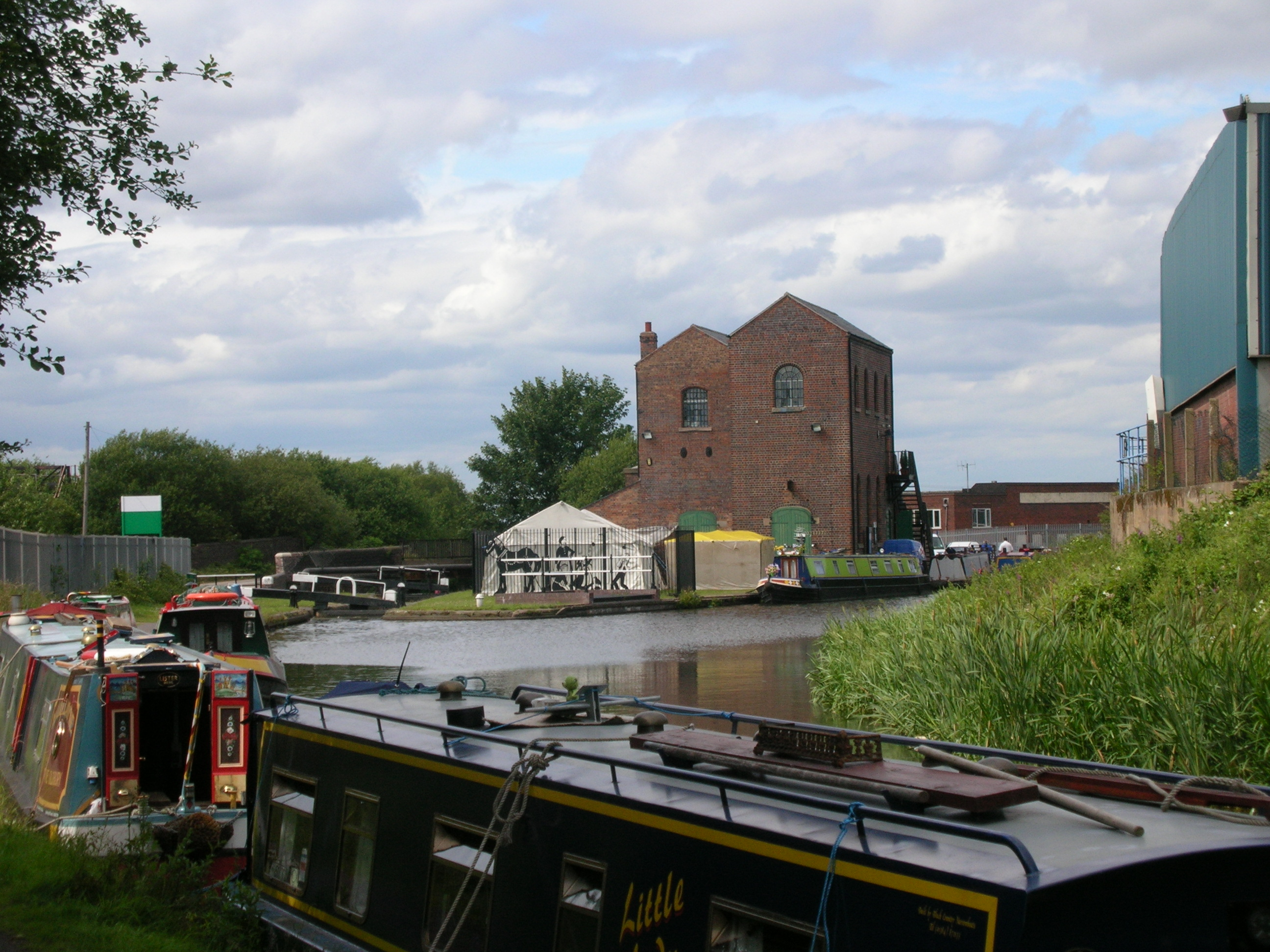
Titford Top Lock, Titford Pumphouse, and the start of the Tat Bank Branch

The Titford Canal (grid reference SO984880) is a narrow (7-foot (2.1 m)) canal, a short branch of the Birmingham Canal Navigations (BCN) in Oldbury, West Midlands, England.

Authorised under the Birmingham Canal Navigation Act 1768 (8 Geo. 3. c. 38), which created the original Birmingham Canal, it was constructed in 1836–7 and opened on 4 November 1837. It now runs from Titford Pool, a reservoir made in 1773–4 which now lies under, and to both sides of, an elevated section of the M5 motorway near the motorway's junction 2, to join the BCN Old Main Line at Oldbury Junction, also under the M5.

Beyond Titford Pool was a continuation, abandoned in 1954, as the Portway Branch, which served coal mines in the Titford Valley. Also from Titford Pool was the Causeway Green Branch; opened in 1858 and abandoned, in parts, in 1954 and by the British Transport Commission Act 1960 (8 & 9 Eliz. 2. c. xlvii) September 1960.

== Titford Pool ==
At a height above sea level of 511 feet (156 m) Titford Pool was one of the original water sources for the James Brindley 491-foot (150 m) Smethwick Summit Level of his Birmingham Canal (later called the Old Main Line). Titford Pool is also the highest navigable canal in the Midlands, with only Rochdale Canal beating it at 600 feet (180 m) above sea level.

This feeder was not made navigable until 1837, with the addition of six locks, nicknamed The Crow, which were adjacent to chemical works owned by Jim Crow. These locks, as is usual on the BCN, have single lower gates to reduce leakage. The Titford Locks (also known as Oldbury Locks) became derelict and were restored in 1973–4.

== The canal ==
Between Titford Pool and the locks is the Grade II listed Langley Maltings (previously used for the malting stage of beer-making). The Maltings have been badly damaged by fire.

At the top lock stands the grade II listed Titford Engine House; built to pump water back up the six locks from the Wolverhampton Level, but later more often used to supply the feeder. It is now the headquarters of the Birmingham Canal Navigations Society.

Also at the top lock is the junction with the Tat Bank Branch (or Spon Lane Branch), no longer navigable, which was the original feeder to the Smethwick Summit, and is now a feeder (made by Thomas Telford, 1830) to Edgbaston Reservoir (Rotton Park Reservoir) which itself feeds the Birmingham and Wolverhampton Levels of the BCN. It was later made navigable for a part of its length to the Stourbridge Railway at Rood End and the British Industrial Plastics chemical factory was built upon it. It is now impassable and without towpath access.

Titford Pool, Tat Bank Branch and the top pound of the Titford Canal are the highest point of the BCN. They are accessible from Engine Street. The Inland Waterways Association National Festival was held at Titford in 1978 and 1982.

== Features ==
Point	Coordinates (Links to map resources)	OS Grid Ref	Notes
Titford Pool (West, to Portway Branch)	52.4903°N 2.0233°W	SO984880	
Titford Pool (South, to Causeway Green Branch)	52.4885°N 2.0215°W	SO986878	
Langley Forge	52.4899°N 2.0106°W	SO99378799	
Langley Maltings	52.4929°N 2.0074°W	SO99598833	
Titford Pumphouse, top lock, Tat Bank Branch	52.4962°N 2.0090°W	SO994887	
Tat Bank Branch (culvert starts)	52.5003°N 1.9995°W	SP00138915	start of culverted feeder to Edgbaston Reservoir
Oldbury Junction	52.5010°N 2.0098°W	SO994892	junction with BCN Old Main Line

== See also ==
- Canals of the United Kingdom
- History of the British canal system
