= Dumfoyn =

Hill in Scotland

Coordinates: 56.013°N 4.335°W

Dumfoyn is a hill in the Campsie Fells of Scotland. It is a volcanic plug, and rises to 426 metres (1,398 ft). It sits beside another hill, Dumgoyne which is a popular ascent for walkers due to its close proximity to Glasgow.
