= Ian McLeod =

Ian McLeod may refer to:

- Ian McLeod (boxer) (born 1969), Scottish boxer
- Ian McLeod (businessman), Scottish businessman
- Ian McLeod (cyclist) (born 1980), South African road racing cyclist
- Ian McLeod (referee) (1954–2017), South African football referee

== See also ==
- Iain MacLeod (disambiguation)
- Ian MacLeod (disambiguation)
