= Ian MacLeod =

Ian MacLeod may refer to:

- Ian MacLeod (footballer), Scottish footballer
- Ian MacLeod (Canadian football), Canadian football player
- Ian R. MacLeod, British science fiction and fantasy writer

== See also ==
- Iain MacLeod (disambiguation)
- Ian McLeod (disambiguation)
