= Malting =

Process of steeping, germinating, and drying grain to convert it into malt

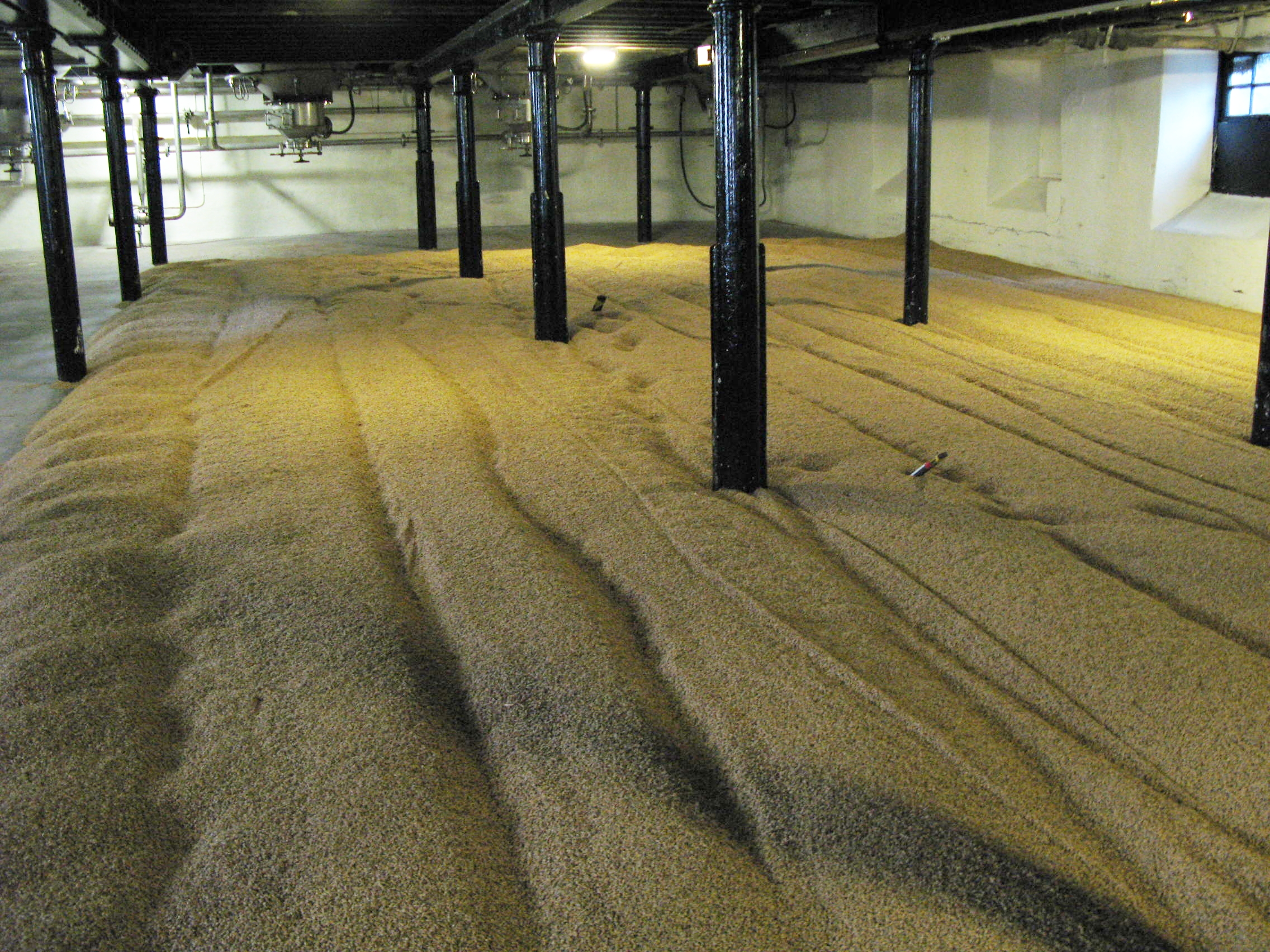
Traditional floor malting at Highland Park Distillery in Scotland

Malting is the process of steeping, germinating, and drying grain to convert it into malt. Germination and sprouting involve a number of enzymes to produce the changes from seed to seedling and the malt producer stops this stage of the process when the required enzymes are optimal. Among other things, the enzymes convert starch to sugars such as maltose, maltotriose and maltodextrines.

The malt is mainly used for brewing or whisky making, but can also be used to make malt vinegar or malt extract. Various grains are used for malting, most often barley, sorghum, wheat or rye.

Several types of equipment can be used to produce the malt. Traditional floor malting germinates the grains in a thin layer on a solid floor, and the grain is manually raked and turned to keep the grains loose and aerated. In a modern malt house the process is more automated, and the grain is germinated on a floor that is slotted to allow air to be forced through the grain bed. Large mechanical turners, e.g., Saladin boxes, keep the much thicker bed loose with higher productivity and better energy efficiency.

== Intake ==
The grain is received at the malt house from the farmer. It is taken in from the field and cleaned (dressed), and dried if necessary, to ensure the grain remains in the best condition to produce good malt. It is tested to check for suitability for malting and to prevent dead or unfit grain from entering the process. Typical quality checks include:

- Moisture content
- Nitrogen content (total nitrogen)
- Percentage of foreign matter
- Absence of fungal growth and metabolites
- Germinative capacity and germinative energy
- Water sensitivity

=== Drying ===
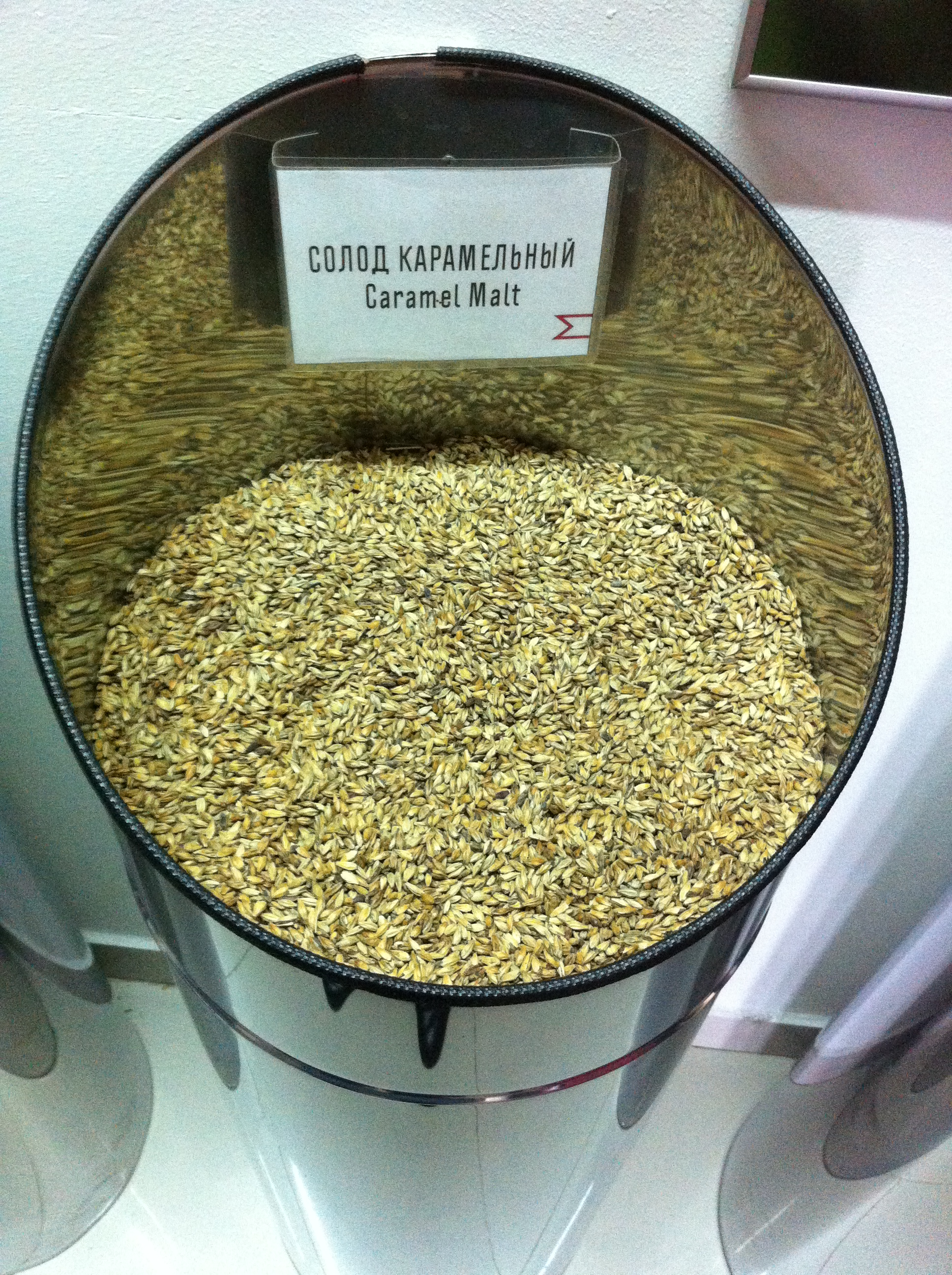
Caramel malt

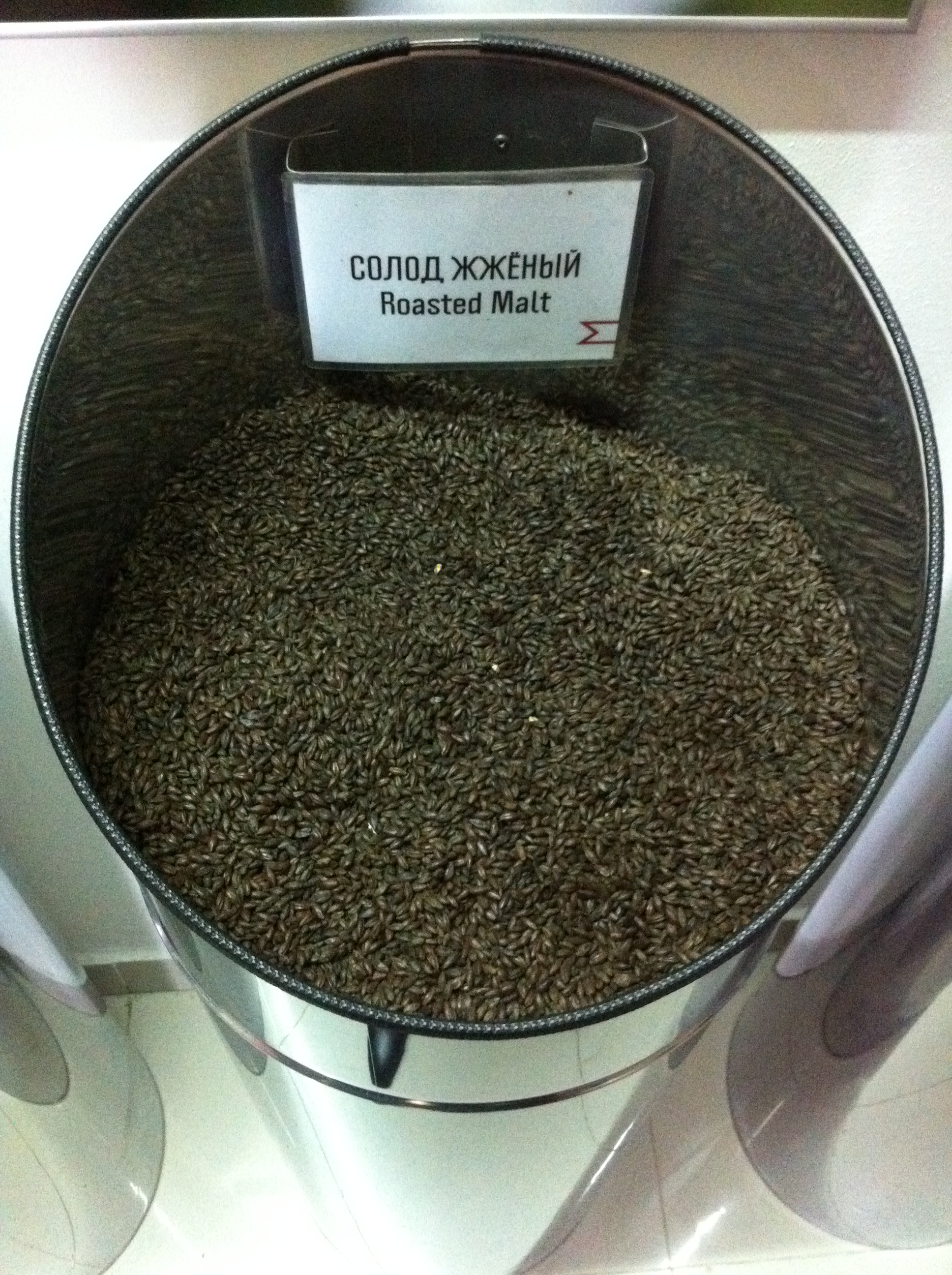
Roasted malt

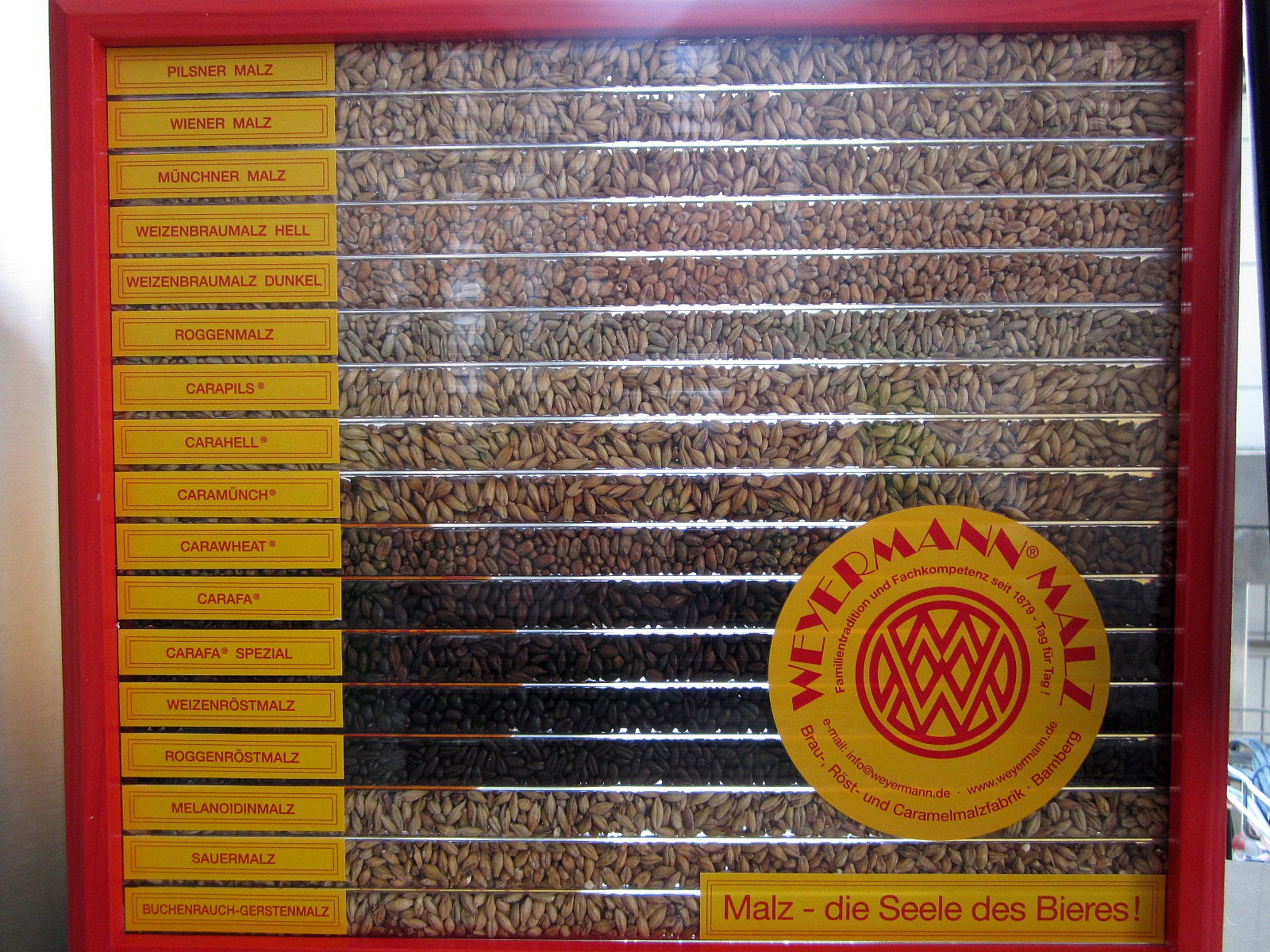
Bavarian malt varieties for beer by Weyermann

Barley received at the malt house with moisture of more than 13% must be dried before it can be safely stored without loss of germinative capacity. The moisture is removed by circulating heated air (up to 50 °C) through the grain and can either be performed using dedicated grain driers or as a batch process using a kiln. High temperatures or over-drying will damage or kill the barley embryos and the grain will not germinate after steeping. The dry barley can safely be stored for up to 18 months without fungal growth or loss of grain vigour.

=== Cleaning ===
The aim of barley cleaning is to remove foreign matter (straw, chaff, dust and thin corns) found in the incoming grain, leaving only the grain most likely to produce a good malt. Magnets are used to remove ferrous metals from the grain, in turn reducing the possibility of sparks, which could lead to a dust explosion. Rotating and shaking sieves are used to remove unwanted foreign matter either larger (straw and un-threshed ears) or smaller (sand and thin corns) than the normal barley grain. During the sieving process an aspiration system removes the dust and chaff. De-stoners or shaking screens are used to separate small stones from the barley. The stones, which are denser than the barley, move out the top of the machine and the cleaned barley exits at the bottom. Half corn separators may be used to remove broken kernels. Half kernels need to be removed as only the one half will germinate and produce enzymes. At the end of the cleaning process the grain is weighed to determine the cleaning losses (the difference between the weight of grain received and the weight of the grain after cleaning) and it is transferred to a silo for storage.

=== Storage ===
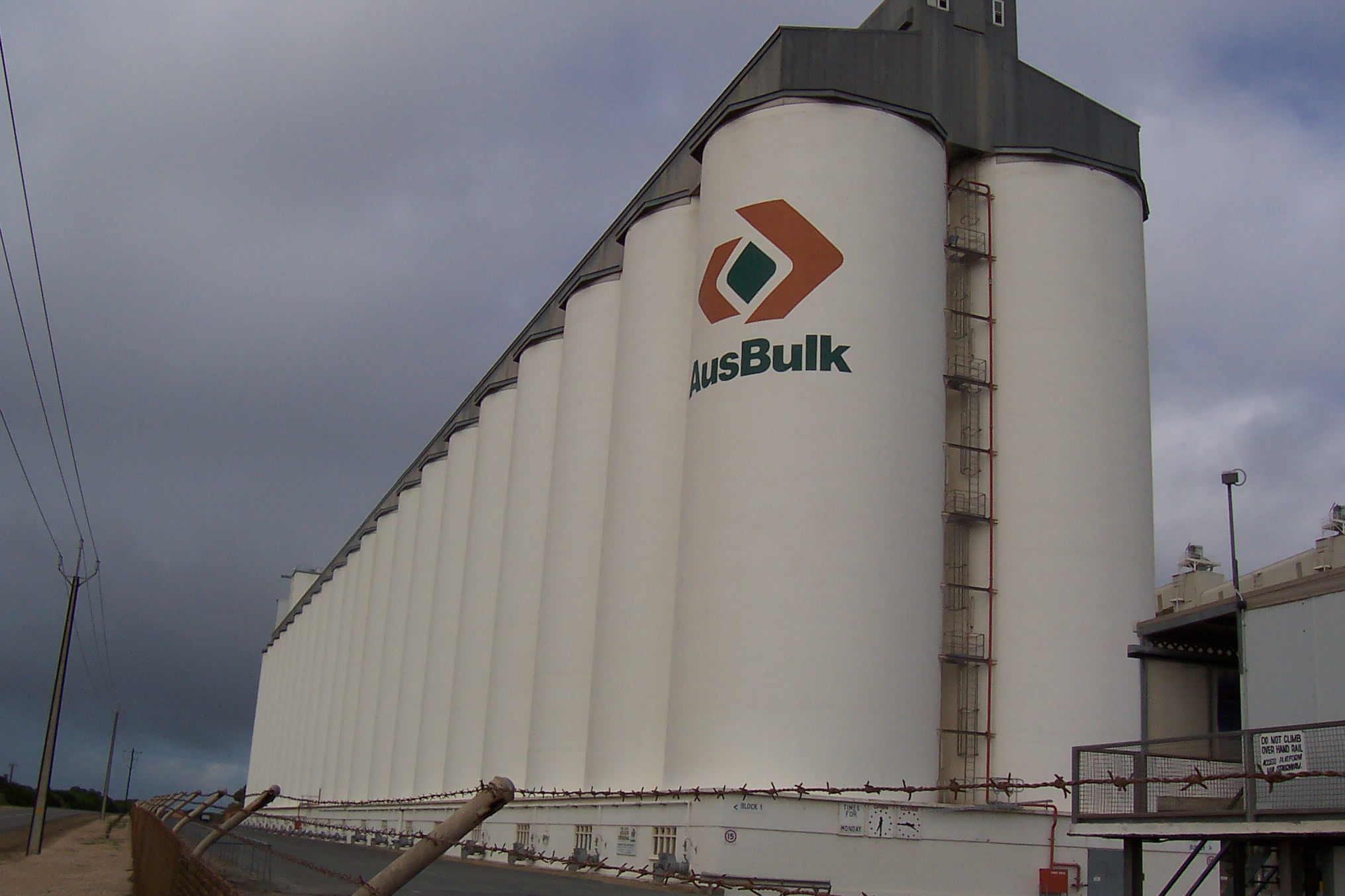
Grain silos at Port Giles, South Australia

The barley must be safely stored to maintain the grain vigour for germination. Storage at a malt house is normally in vertical silos made of steel or concrete for ease of use, but may be in flat stores when large amounts of grain are to be stored. The grain is stored in a manner that protects it from moisture and pests. A typical silo will store between 5,000 and 20,000 tons of clean dry barley ready for malting.

During storage the temperature of the silo is measured and monitored over time as a temperature increase can indicate insect activity. Additional equipment may be used to keep the grain temperature below 18 °C to inhibit insect growth. Silos are normally fitted with a system for rotating grain from one silo to another to break-up hot spots within the grain. A fumigation system can be used to administer a fumigant (normally phosphine) to the silo.

== Wet process ==
The wet process begins with steeping to get germination started and ends with kilning which removes the moisture and produces a stable final product.

A batch of malt is known as a piece and a piece can be as large as 400 tons. Below a standardised base malt protocol is described:

=== Steeping ===
Steeping is the start of the active malting process. Steep water is added to cover the grain and the grain moisture content increases from around 12% to between 40 and 45%. In a modern pneumatic malt house, the grain is alternatively submerged (wet stand) and then drained (an air rest) for two or three cycles to achieve the target grain moisture content and chit count. The first visible sign of germination is the appearance of rootlets known as "chit"; the proportion of chitted grains indicates the progress of the steeping process.

When the grain is immersed in water (known as a "wet stand"), air is bubbled through the slurry of water and grain periodically. The aim of this aeration is to keep the process aerobic to maximize barley growth. Other advantages of the rousing are to get good mixing, to loosen dirt and to even out hydrostatic pressures at the bottom of the steep vessels. (Air flow rate: 1.5m^{3}/tonne per hour)

At the end of the wet stand the water is drained out and this is the start of the "air stand" or "air rest". Fans are run to supply fresh air to replenish oxygen and to remove excess carbon dioxide produced by grain respiration. The temperature of the air supplied is important as the grain should be kept between 10 and 15 °C. The aeration requirements (cubic metres per ton per minute) are higher in the second and third air rests as the grain's metabolic activity is higher. (Air flow rate: 300m^{3}/ton per hour).

At the end of steeping the grain is "cast-out" to germination. Cast-out may be done as a slurry during a wet stand or as moist grain during an air rest.

=== Germination ===
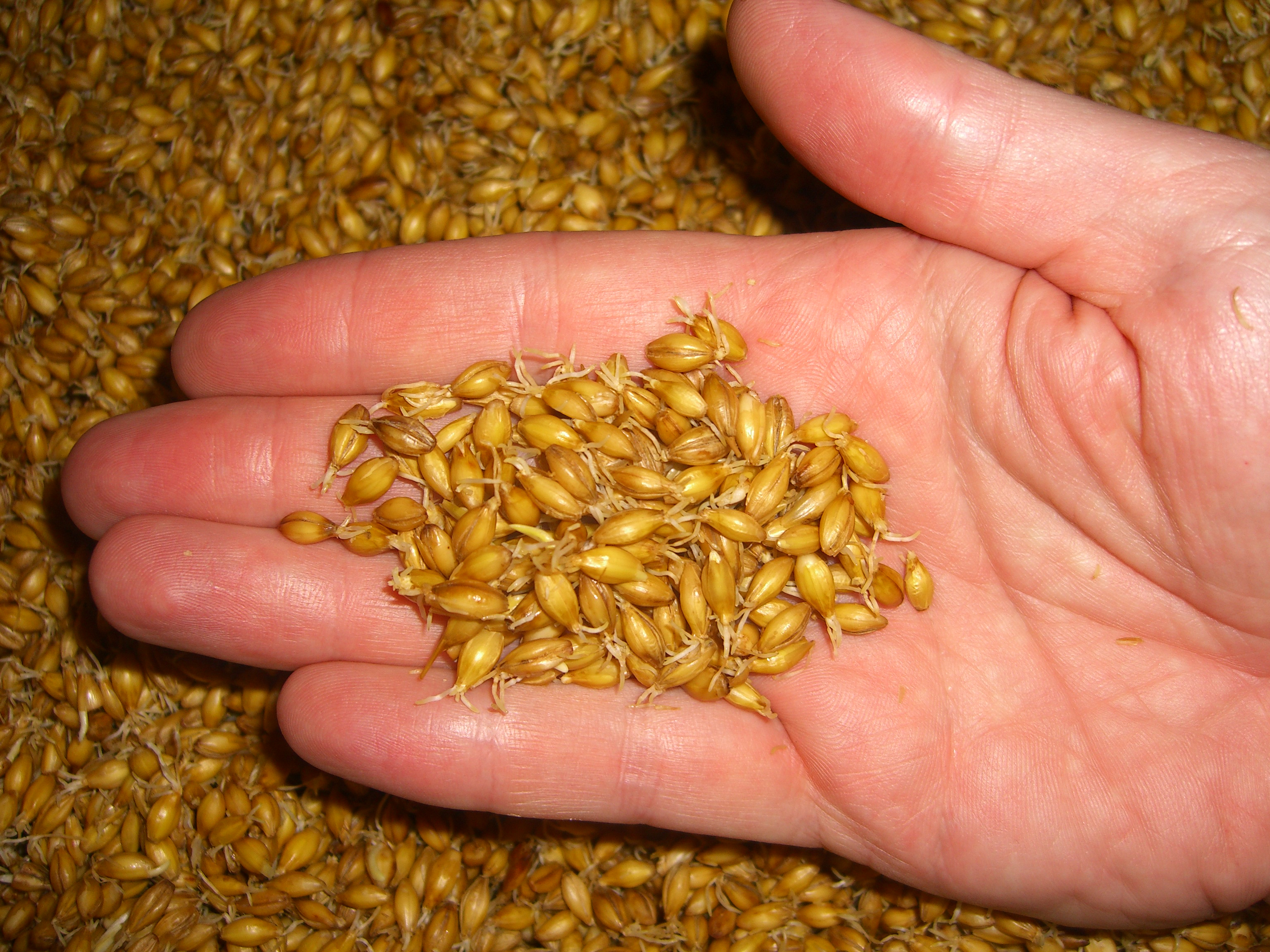
A sample of green malt on about day three, with visible malt culms

The enzymes produced during germination are needed to break down the starch for the brewer or distiller during the mashing process. The aim of germination is to grow the barley grains. This allows the development of malt enzymes, and these enzymes modify the structure of the barley endosperm by breaking down the cell walls and the protein matrix. Germination produces a large amount of heat; if safety precautions are not taken, the malt will burn. The grain bed is maintained at a constant temperature of between 10 and 16 °C by the constant supply of fresh humidified air. Turners move through the grain bed to keep it loose to allow for sufficient airflow.

=== Kilning ===
Kilning reduces the grain moisture content and stops the germination process. In the first stage, the "free drying stage" the air temperatures are kept cool to dry the grain without causing the enzymes to denature.

As the grain dries it is possible to raise the incoming air temperature for the second stage of forced drying to further dry the grain; the target malt moisture after kilning is around 5% by weight. During forced drying the relative humidity of the air coming from the bed drops, and the maltster is able to use a portion of the warm air as return air.

During the last few hours of kilning the air temperature is raised to above 80 °C (the "curing stage") to break SMM down to DMS to reduce the DMS potential of the malt. DMS is an off flavour that tastes like sweetcorn in the final beer. The high temperatures of kilning also produce the colour in the malt through the Maillard reaction.

Finally the kilned malt is cooled before the kiln is emptied.

=== Deculming ===
The rootlets of the malt (also known as culms) are removed from the malt soon after transfer from the kiln. The removed culms are sold or processed as animal feed.

The cleaned malt is stored in silos to be blended with similar malt pieces to produce larger homogenous batches of malt.

=== Malt cleaning ===
Finally the malt is cleaned prior to sale using sieves and aspiration to remove the dust, lumps and stones in the malt. Magnets are used to remove any steel that might damage the mill rollers.
