= Edinburgh Gin =

Brand of gin made in Edinburgh, Scotland

- Type: London Dry gin Gin liqueur
- Manufacturer: Ian MacLeod Distillers
- Origin: Scotland
- Introduced: 2010
- Alcohol by volume: 41.5% (The Classic); 43.0% (Seaside Gin); 57.2% (Cannonball); 20.0% (liqueurs)
- Related products: Sheep Dip blended whisky
- Website: www.edinburghgin.com

Edinburgh Gin is a brand of gin and gin liqueur distilled in Edinburgh, Scotland. The gin was originally made by the Spencerfield Spirit Company, and was purchased by Ian MacLeod Distillers in 2016. Apart from the classic Edinburgh Gin, the brand also produce several variants including Edinburgh Cannonball Gin, Edinburgh Seaside Gin, and a number of limited edition expressions. Edinburgh Gin operate a distillery and visitor attraction in a complex called the Arches in the Old Town of Edinburgh.

== History ==
Edinburgh Gin was founded by married couple Alex and Jane Nichol in 2010. Alex Nichol had previously worked for drinks companies Glenmorangie, Laphroaig and Whyte & Mackay. Since 2005 they had operated an independent bottler, the Spencerfield Spirit Company, which bottled blended whisky under the brand names Pigs Nose and Sheep Dip (both acquired from Whyte & MacKay). The company had its headquarters at the 16th century Spencerfield Farmhouse in Fife. Initially, the company promoted their spirits using a converted horsebox, purchased for £5000, and travelled around farm shows in Scotland and Northern England.

The company diversified into gin in 2010 and the first Edinburgh Gin bottling was launched in June of that year. The bottle was designed in the Art Deco design to reflect the popularity of the drink in its 1920s heyday. At this time the gin was distilled at Langley Distillery in England, using a 12,000 litre traditional copper pot still nicknamed Jenny.

The gin's popularity grew quickly, driven by appearances at trade shows, and the following year Edinburgh Gin was listed in Waitrose stores in Scotland.

In 2014, a basement property was purchased from a hotel at Rutland Place, in the West End of Edinburgh, and the company opened a small distillery visitor attraction and bar to the public. At launch, there were three different public tour options. The distillery at Rutland Place operated two 150 litre stills, nicknamed Flora and Caledonia, which were used for seasonal and special releases. Following in 2016 a second distillery was purchased in the Biscuit Factory, Leith. This distillery initially produced only original Edinburgh Gin but production of Edinburgh Seaside Gin was also moved there from Rutland Place in 2018. By 2016, distillation of Edinburgh Gin was done wholly within the City of Edinburgh.

At this time, Edinburgh Gin was experiencing a period of rapid growth. in 2015, Nielsen Scantrack named Edinburgh Gin Scotland's fastest growing gin brand, with Edinburgh Gin Raspberry Liqueur the 15th most valuable gin brand overall in Scotland. By 2018, Edinburgh gin was the 6th most valuable off-trade drinks brand in Scotland, ahead of Bell's, Brewdog, and Innis & Gunn.

Spencerfield Spirit Company was acquired by Ian Macleod Distillers in 2016. The Edinburgh Gin brand name, as well as those of the company's blended whiskies, were added to their portfolio and the Spencerfield Spirit branding was wound down. Ian Macleod purchased a site on East Market Street in 2018 and announced plans for a new brand home and distillery attraction for Edinburgh Gin. The chosen site had been earmarked for development by Edinburgh City Council, who noted its potential for a gateway regeneration project. This project was concurrent with the company's investment in its other visitor sites, including the revival of Rosebank distillery. The company predicted visitor numbers to the new distillery would be in excess of 100,000 per year.

In recent years Edinburgh Gin have released several limited-edition gins themed around persons and places associated with the Fringe Festival, including a limited edition collaboration with Phoebe Waller-Bridge in 2021 and with Eddie Izzard in 2023.

== Edinburgh Gin Distillery at the Arches ==
Edinburgh Gin Distillery at the Arches

- Location within Edinburgh city centre

General information
- Location: The Arches, East Market Street, Edinburgh EH8 8FS, Scotland, United Kingdom
- Coordinates: 55.9513°N 3.1846°W
- Opened: 2024

Design and construction
- Architecture firm: Staran Architects

Other information
- Public transit: Edinburgh Waverley

Listed Building – Category C(S)
- Official name: Jeffrey Street Wall, Vaults, Railings and Pier
- Designated: 24 January 2003
- Reference no.: LB49085

The Arches is Edinburgh Gin's distillery, brand home and visitor centre, located on East Market Street, Edinburgh. The attraction opened to the public on 6 December 2024. At launch the attraction offered four different tour types including a gin-making experience and a gin and chocolate pairing tour. Seasonal tours and experiences are sometimes held, which have included wreath-making workshops and cheese pairings with Edinburgh cheesemonger IJ Mellis.

The distillery operates two 2,000 litre stills nicknamed Annie and Lina, after the first female gardeners to work at the Royal Botanic Gardens, Edinburgh. A third, smaller still, is nicknamed Matilda and used for experimental purposes. The Arches is built on the site of the former Trinity Church and incorporates arches and brickwork from the heritage building into its design. Part of the original site is C listed, and five 19th-century structures have been folded into the modern building. In Summer 2025 a second rooftop bar, the Roof Terrace Bar, was added to the site.

== Production ==
Edinburgh Gin uses a combination of maceration and vapour infusion distillation. Most botanicals are macerated overnight in neutral grain spirit, but delicate ingredients are suspended in the head of the still. Prior to production moving to the Arches, the still at the Biscuit Factory had a copper basket for this purpose; spirits produced at Rutland Place, where the stills did not have baskets fitted, would have their botanicals placed in the still in teabags instead.

The Classic Gin uses juniper from North Macedonia, while Seaside Gin and Cannonball Gin use juniper from Italy.

== Reception & Awards ==
In 2010 the original Edinburgh Gin was awarded a SIP Gold award, followed by the IWSC silver award and Great Taste Gold in 2011. Other Edinburgh Gin expressions have also been successful at the IWSC, with Cannonball Gin being awarded IWSC Gold in 2015.

Edinburgh Gin Head Distiller David Wilkinson was named Distiller of the Year at the Icons of Gin Awards 2019, and the Arches was named Scottish Gin Distillery of the Year and Gin Tourist Destination of the Year at the Scottish Gin Awards in 2025.
