= Ian Macleod Distillers =

Scotch whisky distiller

Ian Macleod Distillers Ltd.
- Industry: Drink industry
- Founded: 1933; 93 years ago
- Founder: Leonard Russell
- Headquarters: Broxburn, Scotland, UK
- Website: www.ianmacleod.com

Ian Macleod Distillers Ltd. is an independent, family-owned business which produces Scotch whisky and other spirits, based in Broxburn, Scotland. It was founded by Leonard Russell, Snr. in 1933. They own three single malt whisky distilleries: Glengoyne distillery, Tamdhu distillery, and Rosebank distillery and one gin distillery: Edinburgh Gin. They also produce a number of other distilled spirits including Smokehead Islay whisky.

The company is a member of the Scotch Whisky Association.

== History ==
Ian Macleod traces its roots to the whisky brokerage founded in October 1933 by Leonard Russell, Snr. The Russell Brokers firm acquired Ian MacLeod & Co., Ltd. in March 1963 followed in May 1963 by the purchase of Isle of Skye Blended Whisky. In March 1968 the King Robert II line of spirits was acquired.

In May 1981 Ian Macleod, in conjunction with J & G Grant, opened Broxburn Bottlers, Ltd.

In September 1990, Ian Macleod acquired London Hill Gin, a brand that dates back to 1785. In May 1996 Watson's Rums were brought on board and in September 1998 Hedges & Butler Blended Scotch and Wincarnis Tonic Wines were added to the portfolio.

The company officially became Ian MacLeod Distillers with the acquisition of the Glengoyne Distillery in April 2003. Glengoyne along with Langs Blended Whisky were purchased from Highland Distillers. In January 2006 Smokehead Islay Whisky was introduced by the company.

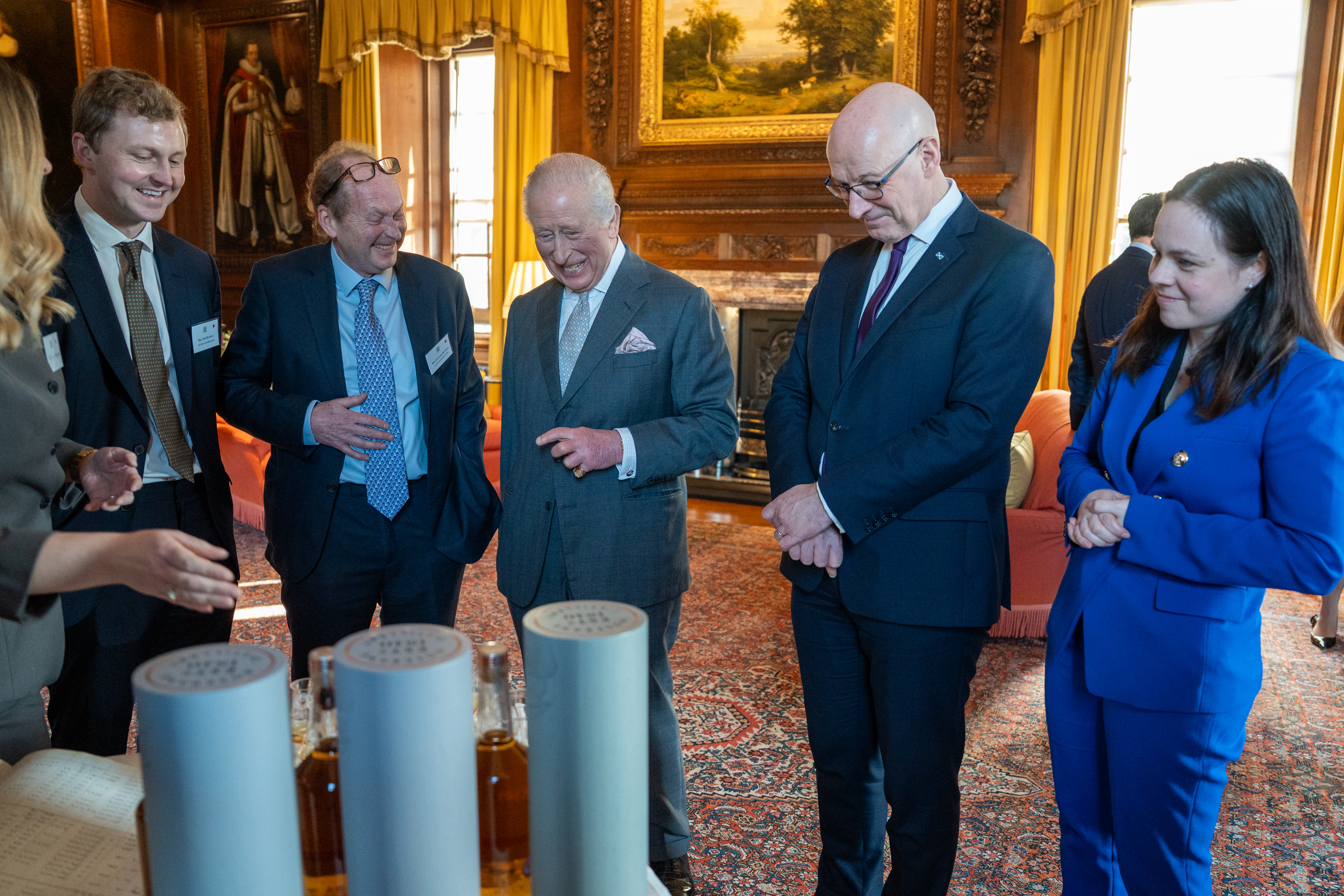
Leonard Russell at the King's Reception in Holyrood Palace in 2026

In June 2011, Ian Macleod added another mothballed distillery from Highland Distillers Tamdhu distillery. The brand was re-launched in May 2013 at the Speyside Whisky Festival. In September 2016 Spencerfield Spirits was acquired, bringing Edinburgh Gin, Pig's Nose, Sheep Dip and The Feathery Scotch Whiskies into the fold.

In October 2017, Ian MacLeod bought the trademark for Rosebank distillery from Diageo and the distillery site from Scottish Canals with the intention of reopening the distillery. In July 2023 production restarted at Rosebank Distillery.

On 6 December 2024, Edinburgh Gin opened a new distillery and visitor centre in the Old Town area of Edinburgh.

== Distilleries ==
- Edinburgh Gin (founded 2010)
- Glengoyne distillery (founded 1833)
- Tamdhu distillery (founded 1896)
- Rosebank distillery (founded 1840)
- Laggan Bay distillery (under construction)

== Brands ==
=== Core brands ===
- Glengoyne Highland single malt Scotch whisky
- Rosebank Lowland single malt Scotch whisky
- Tamdhu Speyside single malt Scotch whisky
- Smokehead Islay single malt Scotch whisky
- Shieldaig single malt Scotch whisky
- Laggan Bay distillery
- King Robert II blended Scotch whisky
- Isle of Skye blended Scotch whisky
- Sheep Dip blended malt Scotch whisky
- Pig's Nose blended Scotch whisky
- Mash cut blended malt Scotch whisky
- Barrowman's
- Edinburgh Gin
- London Hill Gin
- Raffles Gin

=== Other brands ===
- 'As We Get It' Whisky
- Blackshield
- Dunfife Whisky
- Glenshire Whisky
- Major Gunn's Whisky
- Malborough Gin
- Marshal Whisky
- Maxwell Whisky
- Queen's Seal Whisky
- Rostov Vodka
- Scottish Stag Whisky
