= Glengoyne distillery =

Scottish whisky distillery

Coordinates: 56.01403°N 4.36378°W

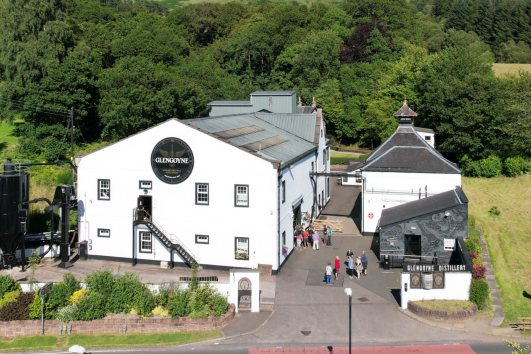

Region: Highland
- Location: Dumgoyne, Scotland
- Owner: Ian Macleod Distillers
- Founded: 1833
- Status: Operational
- Water source: Stream water from Dumgoyne Hill
- No. of stills: 1 wash still 2 spirit stills
- Capacity: 1,100,000 litres

Glengoyne Single Malt
- Type: Single malt
- Age(s): 10 years 12 Years; Cask strength 15 years 18 years 21 years 25 years 30 years
- Cask type(s): 80% refill 20% first fill sherry wood
- ABV: 40%–57.2%

Glengoyne distillery is a whisky distillery continuously in operation since its founding in 1833 at Dumgoyne, north of Glasgow, Scotland. Glengoyne is unique in producing Highland single malt whisky matured in the Lowlands. Located upon the Highland Line, the division between the Highlands and Lowlands of Scotland, Glengoyne’s stills are in the Highlands while maturing casks of whisky rest across the road in the Lowlands.

== History ==
=== Illicit stills ===
In the early 19th century, due to the heavy taxes on spirit production imposed by the government, many whisky producers were forced to operate illegally. The area around Glengoyne was full of hills and forests which provided excellent cover for the distillers. Records show that at least eighteen illicit whisky stills were operating in the area.

In the 1820s an act of Parliament was passed, which reduced the cost of the licence required to distil, and the duty payable on spirit sales. Shortly after the introduction of the Excise Act 1823 (or 'Wash Act') the first of these illicit stills came into official existence, with Glengoyne following later in 1833. Although Glengoyne only officially existed from 1833 and no records exist from before this date, it is believed that distilling on the site pre-dates that with a local historian writing that the smoke of "illicit stills" was visible in the area in the early 19th century.

=== Whisky production ===
Glengoyne Distillery

The distillery began distilling in 1833 and was known as the Burnfoot distillery. It was originally owned by George Connell who built the distillery and took out a lease on the surrounding land, on which was built a warehouse which is still in use today. In 1876 the distillery was sold, by Archiball G. MacLellen, to the Lang Brothers who were based in Glasgow. It is stated that the Langs intended to name the distillery Glengoyne, but due to a mistake by a clerk it was recorded as Glen Guin. In 1894, or 1905 it was changed to Glengoyne which comes from 'Glenguin' or 'Glen of the Wild Geese'.

The distillery remained with the Lang Brothers until taken over by the Robertson & Baxter Group in 1965, who later became the Edrington Group. In 1966 and 1967 the number of stills was increased from two to three as the distillery underwent a rebuilding project.

In 1984 the Lang Brothers became suppliers of whiskies to the then Queen Mother, Her Majesty Queen Elizabeth's household. The Royal Warrant has since been delegated to Ian Macleod and is featured on all Glengoyne products.

=== Modern era and expansion ===
In April 2003, Ian Macleod Distillers Ltd. acquired Glengoyne Distillery, and the 'Glengoyne Single Malt' and 'Langs Blended Whisky' brands. The acquisition of Glengoyne Distillery meant that Ian Macleod became a fully integrated distiller, blender and bottler. Under Ian Macleod, Glengoyne saw a vast increase in output capacity as well as a similar rise in sales.Speaking of the acquisition and planned expansions in 2003, Leonard Russell, managing director for Ian Macleod stated "We'll be aiming to increase sales of the Glengoyne from the current level of 450,000 litres to one million litres next year".Later, speaking in 2005 Russell stated "we continue to make whisky exactly the same way at Glengoyne". The original warehouse built by George Connell is still on the site, as the shop and visitor reception area. Today, Glengoyne has eight working warehouses with a total capacity of nearly two million litres (4.5 million bottles) of spirit.

== Production and character ==
Glengoyne Distillery is situated at Dumgoyne, on the south-western edge of the Scottish Highlands, close to Loch Lomond and to the north of Glasgow. Although distilled in the Highlands, making Glengoyne a Highland single malt, the whisky is matured in the Lowlands. This is because the distillery itself sits upon the Highland Line, the division between the Highlands and Lowlands of Scotland which splits the distillery in two. The boundary line runs underneath the A81 road from Glasgow to Aberfoyle and passes in front of the distillery with the warehouses located to the southwest of the road. Glengoyne is located immediately adjacent the West Highland Way, the most popular long walk in Scotland, and regularly enjoys visits from hikers.

Glengoyne is regularly referred to as the "most beautiful distillery in Scotland". The distillery has been in continuous operation producing Highland single malt whisky for over 175 years with a current distilling capacity of over one million litres of alcohol and over 35,000 visitors per annum.

Glengoyne and Bruichladdich, is one of only two distilleries remaining today that uses Golden Promise barley, which is low in yield but high in quality. The distillery's water supply comes from the Glengoyne Burn which flows from the nearby Dumgoyne hill into the distillery grounds before continuing on to Loch Lomond.

Unlike many malt whiskies, Glengoyne does not use peat smoke to dry their barley but instead favours the use of warm air. The clear and bright appearance and distinctive flavour of the Glengoyne single malts are credited to this lack of peat smoke. This rare characteristic is utilised in the marketing of Glengoyne with the use of the promotional slogan "The authentic taste of malt whisky untainted by peat smoke".

As a result of the use of unpeated malt Glengoyne has been noted as being stylistically closer to a Lowland single malt as opposed to a Highland single malt.

== Products ==
At its current operating capacity Glengoyne produces over one million litres of pure spirit (new make spirit) every year which is used in a number of different whiskies. The distillery has won various awards for its products including a double gold awarded to the 17-year-old Single Malt at the San Francisco World Spirits Competition and a gold for the 15-year-old Scottish oak wood finish for "best wood finish" by the Stockholm Beer and Whisky Festival. Glengoyne 17-year-old was voted "World's Best Single Highland Malt" in the "Best of the Best" whisky tasting, organised by Whisky Magazine.

Due to the rapid growth recently of the Scotch malt whisky industry (recent figures indicate a 9% growth in 2002) and of the premium whisky market as a whole, Glengoyne is mainly marketed in the UK, Scandinavian, French, German and USA markets.

=== Current Range ===
Range	Aged	Cask finish	Awards
Core Single Malt	10 years		Gold at 2007 San Francisco World Spirits Competition
Core Single Malt	12 years		Double Gold at 2005 San Francisco World Spirits Competition
Core Single Malt	15 years		N/A
Core Single Malt	18 years		N/A
Core Single Malt	21 years		Gold at 2005 San Francisco World Spirits Competition
Core Single Malt	32 years		N/A
Limited Edition Single Malt	16 years	Glenguin Shiraz Cask	
Limited Edition Single Malt	15 years	Scottish Oak wood	Gold at 2005 Stockholm Beer & Whisky festival
White Oak		American first-fill Bourbon and virgin	
White Oak	24 years		

=== Past range ===
Range	Aged	Cask finish	Number of bottles
2008 Rare Bottlings Single Malt
2008 Rare Bottlings Single Malt	11 years Single cask	European Oak Sherry Hogshead	301
2008 Rare Bottlings Single Malt	16 years Single cask	Refill Hogshead	287
2008 Rare Bottlings Single Malt	19 years Single cask	Oloroso Hogshead	262
2007 Rare Bottlings Single Malt
2007 Rare Bottlings Single Malt	14 years Single cask	American Oak Sherry Hogshead	296
2007 Rare Bottlings Single Malt	20 years Single cask	Spanish Oak Sherry Butt	592

Range	Aged
2006 Rare Bottlings Single Malt	21 years Single cask
2006 Rare Bottlings Single Malt	29 years Single cask
2006 Rare Bottlings Single Malt	36 years Single cask
2006 Rare Bottlings Single Malt	16 years Single cask miniature
2006 Rare Bottlings Single Malt	2005 Rare Bottlings Single Malt
19 years Single cask	2005 Rare Bottlings Single Malt
32 years Single cask	2005 Rare Bottlings Single Malt
37 years Single cask	2005 Rare Bottlings Single Malt

== See also ==
- List of whisky brands
- List of distilleries in Scotland
