= Tamdhu distillery =

Single malt Scotch Speyside whisky distillery in Banffshire, Scotland

Coordinates: 57°27′32.5″N 03°21′13.0″W

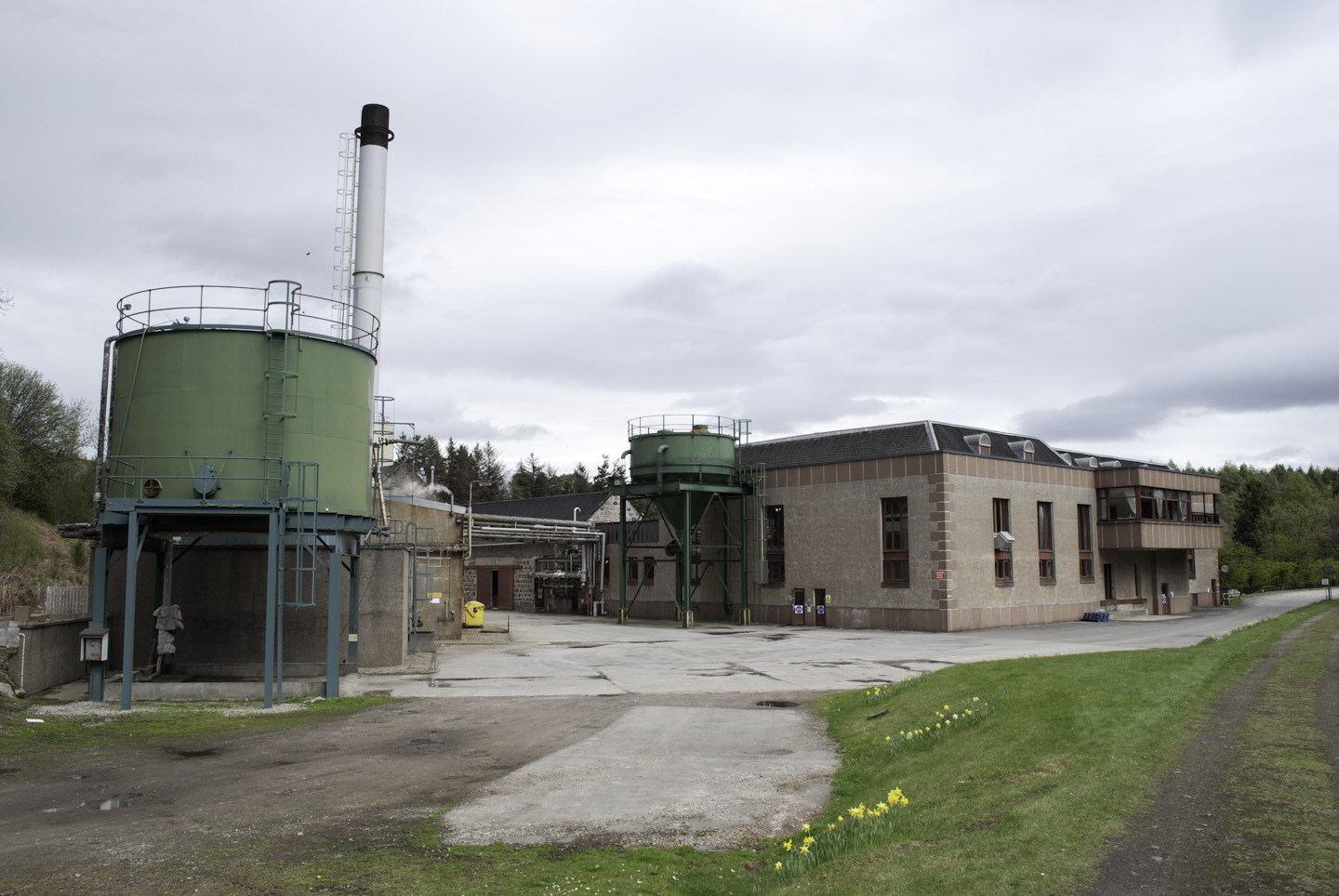

Region: Speyside
- Location: Knockando in Banffshire, Scotland
- Owner: Ian Macleod Distillers
- Founded: 1897
- Status: Operational
- No. of stills: 3 wash stills 3 spirit stills
- Capacity: 4,500,000 litres
- Mothballed: 1911–1912, 1928–1947, 2010–2013

Tamdhu distillery is a single malt Scotch Speyside whisky distillery, located in the village of Knockando in Moray, Scotland. Tamdhu comes from Gaelic for "little dark hill".

== History ==
The distillery was founded in 1896 by a group of assemblers, wishing to engage in the production of their own whisky. The first malt whisky was distilled and casked in 1897. It quickly passed on into the hands of Highland Distillers. The history of the distillery was fairly quiet, without changing owners, but still marked by a long dormancy between 1927 and 1947.

Its production capacity was tripled between 1972 and 1975. The distillery has now 3 wash stills and 3 spirit stills. Its annual production of pure alcohol is 4 million gallons.

Unlike its neighbours, the Tamdhu distillery has no roof-shaped pagoda above its malt furnaces. This is one of the last distilleries to malt all of its barley on the spot by a mechanical saladin.

It was announced that as of April 2010, the Tamdhu Distillery, belonging to the Highland Distillers subsidiary of the Edrington Group, was being closed and the plant shuttered. It was then sold to Ian MacLeod Distillers in June 2011, who recommenced production of single malt in May 2013.

The Tamdhu whisky is almost completely used for the production of blended whiskies, such as The Famous Grouse, J & B and Cutty Sark. Under current owners, Ian MacLeod, Tamdhu's bottlings include a 10 year-old, 100% sherry-matured standard bottling and a non-age-statement (NAS) 100% sherry matured "Batch Strength". The "Batch Strength" is in its second edition as of early 2017. Ian MacLeod initially released a "Limited Edition" bottling of 1000 bottles to commemorate the rebirth of the distillery. These were aged in first-fill sherry casks. Previous owners, Highland Distillers, bottlings of Tamdhu included a 10-year-old, 18-year-old and a no-age-statement bottling. Other bottlings are sold by independent bottlers.

In 2017 Ian MacLeod released Tamdhu 50. It is a 50 year old bottling from a first-fill European oak sherry butt (cask 4678). It was distilled on 2 November 1963 and bottled March 2017. It had an out-turn of 100 bottles.

== See also ==
- List of whisky brands
