= Saladin box =

Tool used to malt barley

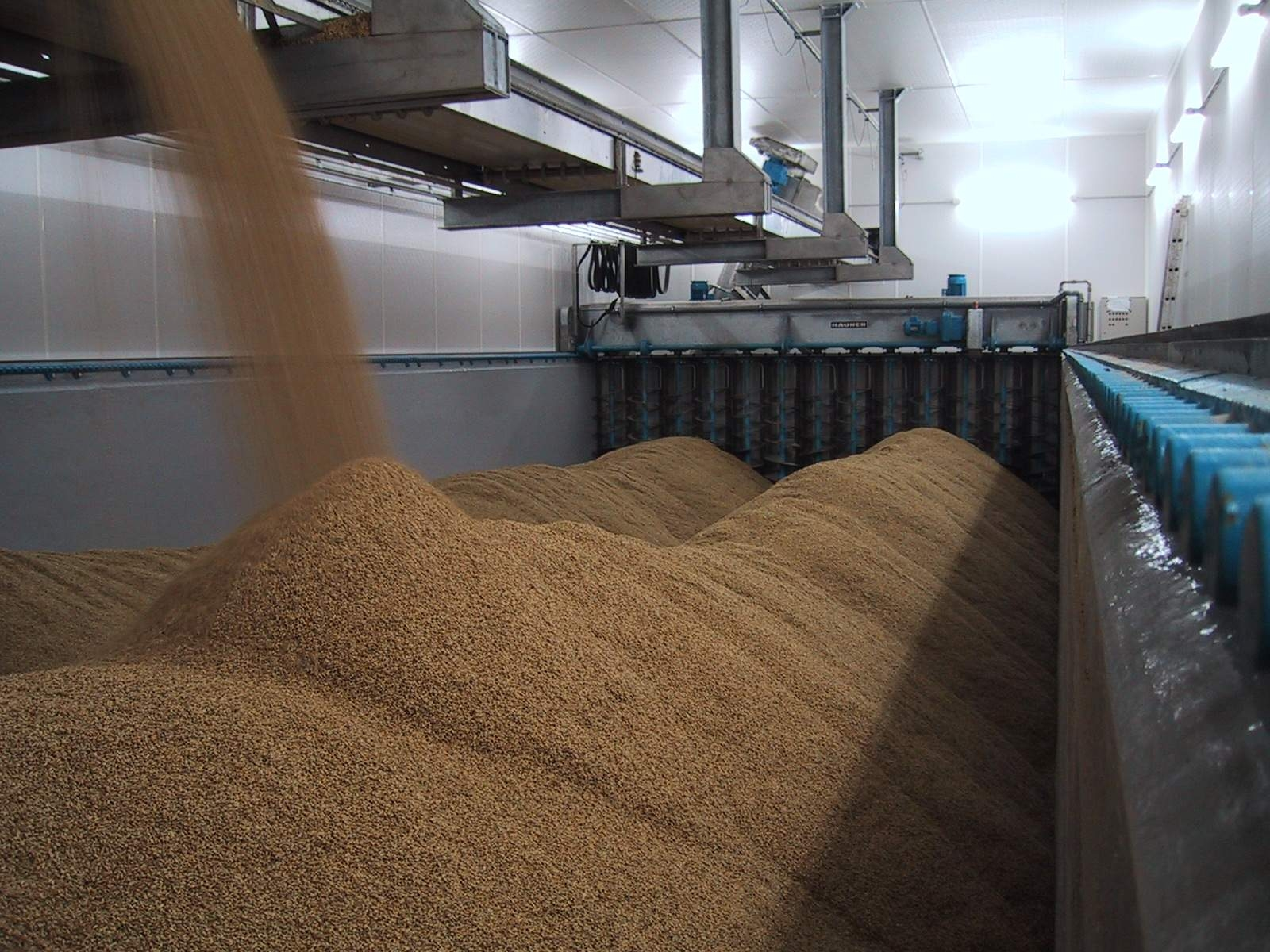
Filling a Saladin box, Sangerhausen

A Saladin box is an instrument used for malting barley. It consists of a large rectangular container about 50 meters in length, and a set of vertical screws attached to a crossbar. The crossbar moves horizontally across the length of the container while the motion of the screws raises the barley from the bottom to the top. Combined with mechanical air flow across the barley for cooling, this allows for beds of barley between 60 cm (24 in) and 80 cm (31 in) deep to be turned over two or three times a day. The screws are moved and turned by a system of pulleys and belts.

The Saladin box was invented by French engineer Charles Saladin in the late 1800s to overcome the problem where the roots of the malting barley would become entangled if not regularly turned by hand, forming large mats unusable for further processing, as encountered in the earlier system that used artificial air flow to cool the barley in deeper beds designed by Galland.

The first U.S. maltster to use the Saladin system was Louis C. Huck in Chicago, Illinois.

Modern malting devices use a similar system of screws as those invented by Saladin, but use ribbon screws rather than closed screws, perforated floors for aeration and cooling, and circular vessels instead of rectangular boxes

In Scotland only one distillery still uses the Saladin box, the Tamdhu distillery. This distillery uses two such boxes to fill the kiln, and two steeps to fill the box. Tamdhu was, incidentally, also one of the first Scottish distilleries to install a Saladin box.
