= Rosebank distillery =

Whisky distillery in Falkirk, Scotland

Coordinates: 56°00′08.7″N 3°48′13.0″W

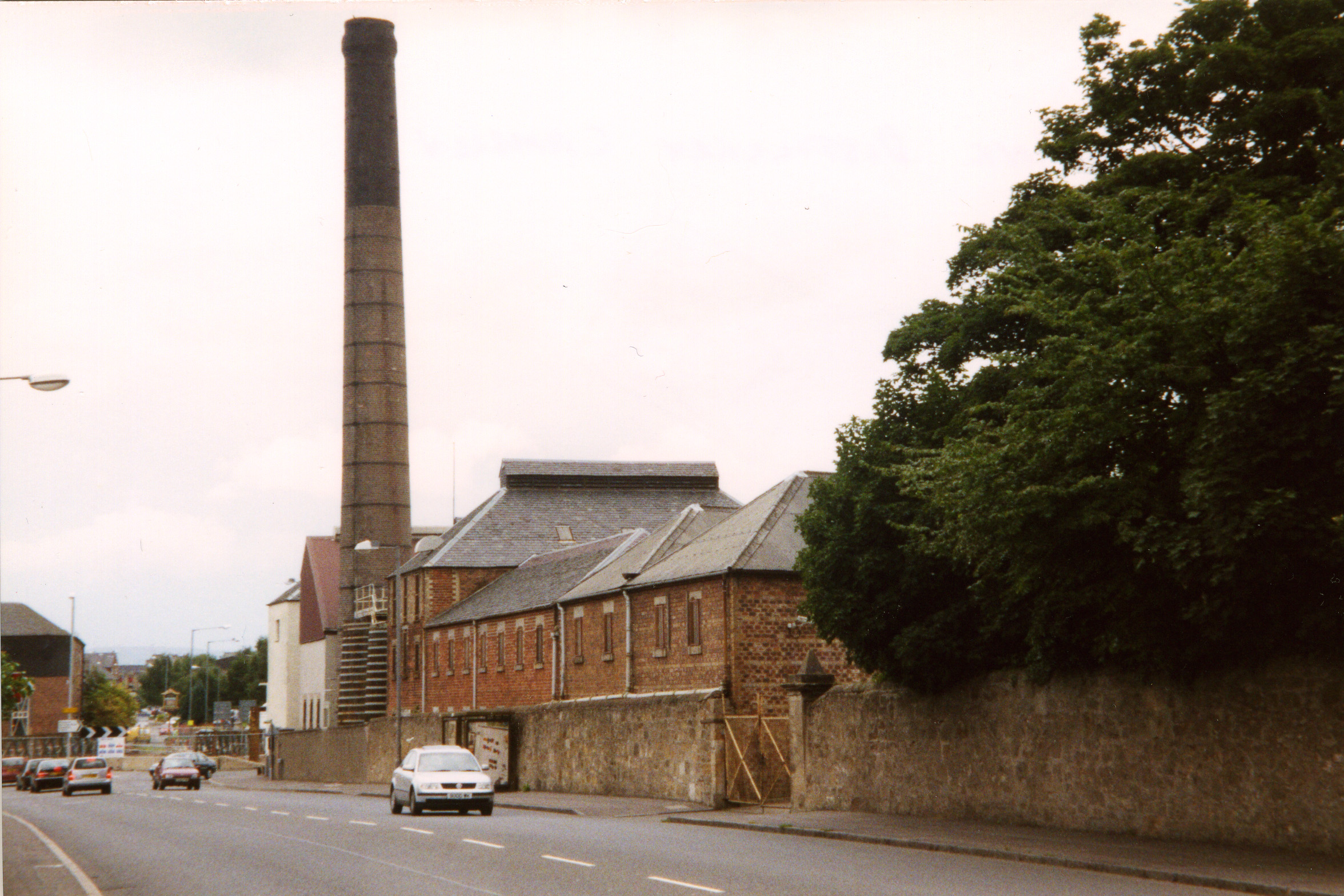
- Rosebank Distillery 2006

Region: Lowland
- Location: Camelon, Scotland
- Owner: Ian Macleod Distillers
- Founded: 1798
- Founder: Stark Brothers
- Status: Operational
- Water source: Carron Valley Reservoir
- No. of stills: three pot, two wash, one spirit
- Capacity: 559,169.301 litres per year
- Mothballed: 1993 to 2002, closed 2002 to 2023
- Website: www.rosebank.com

Rosebank 1990 (2011)
- Type: Lowland
- Age(s): 21 years old
- Cask type(s): oak
- ABV: 53.80%
- Characteristics: fruit/floral

Rosebank 1990 – Mission (2011)
- Type: Lowland
- Age(s): 21 years old
- Cask type(s): oak
- ABV: 54.60%
- Characteristics: fruit/floral

Rosebank 1990 – Old Malt Cask (2009)
- Type: Lowland
- Age(s): 19 years old
- ABV: 50%
- Characteristics: fruit/floral

Rosebank 1991 – Connoisseurs Choice (2008)
- Type: Lowland
- Age(s): 17 years old
- ABV: 43%
- Characteristics: fruit/floral

Rosebank Distillery is a Lowland single malt Scotch whisky distillery situated in Camelon on the banks of the Forth and Clyde canal between Edinburgh and Glasgow.

The distillery was founded on its present site in 1840 by James Rankine, a local wine merchant, and within forty years the Rankine's were shipping their whisky around the world. Famed for producing a delicious, triple-distilled whisky, Rosebank gained a reputation for producing one of Scotland's finest Lowland whiskies, known as 'King of the Lowlands'.

Rosebank Distillery closed its doors in 1993 and the lay empty for three decades. In October 2017, Ian MacLeod Distillers Ltd purchased the site from Scottish Canals and the trademarks from Diageo with the intention of reopening the site.

After extensive restoration, production restarted at Rosebank in 2023 and the Distillery opened to visitors on 7th June 2024.

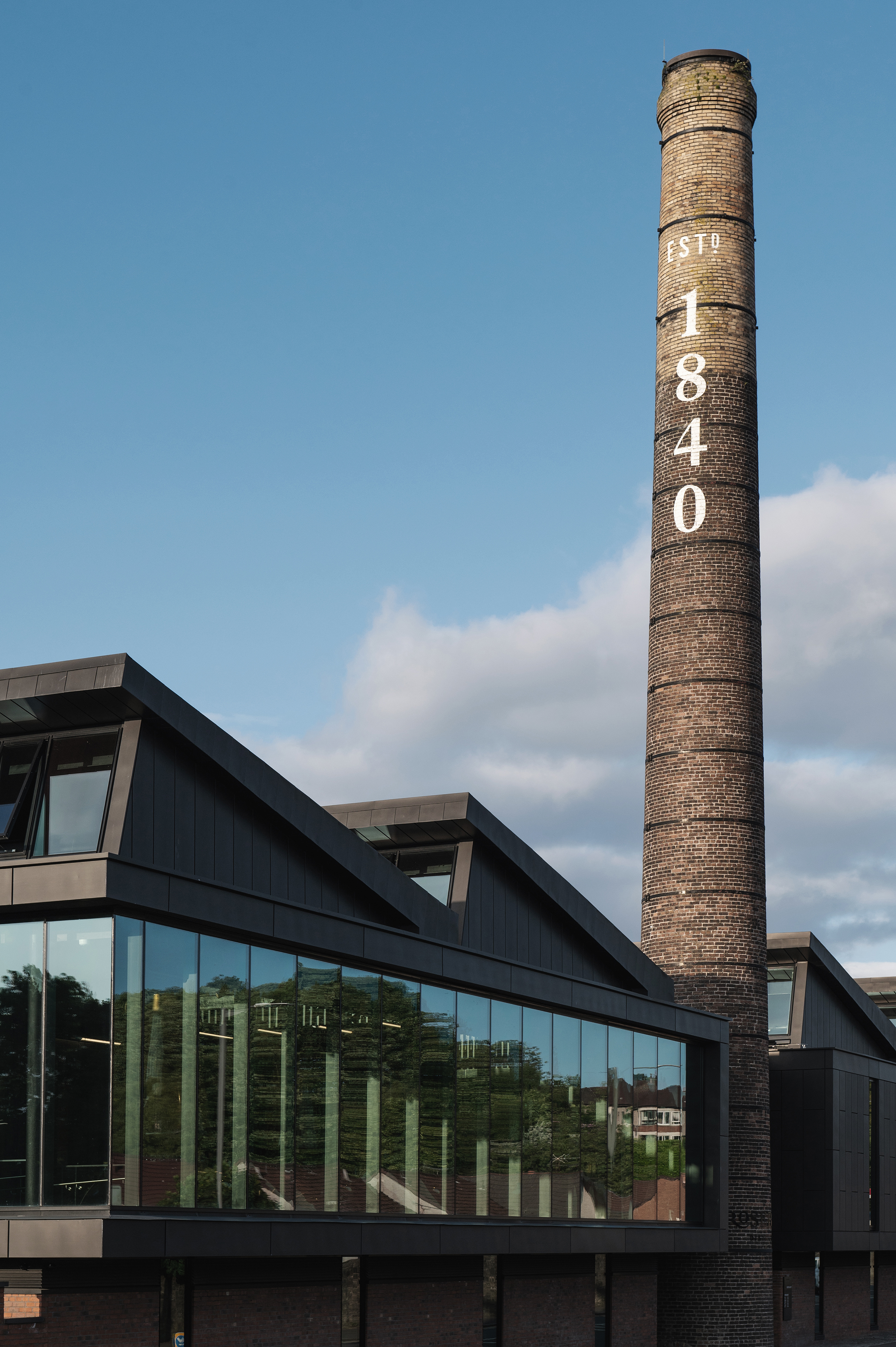
Rosebank Distillery, 2024

Rosebank's revival is heralded as the reawakening of one of Scotland's most iconic silent distilleries. The distillery was awarded five-star status from VisitScotland within one week of opening and was named 'Best Regeneration Project' in the 2024 Herald Property Awards.

In May 2025, the distillery was named as one of the winners of the annual Royal Incorporation of Architects in Scotland (RIAS) awards, and thereby longlisted for the RIAS Best Building in Scotland Award. The judges said that "the retention and restoration of the chimney, lockkeeper's cottage and red-brick buildings reflect a commitment to memory and place".

== History ==
Records exist, showing that a distillery existed in Falkirk as early as 1798, it was run by the Stark brothers in Laurieston. In 1817, James Robertson opened a distillery nearby named Rosebank – records are unclear as to whether this was in the same location as the later distillery. It remained open only until 1819. In 1827 John Stark (of the brothers) opened Camelon distillery on the west bank of the canal, he ran this until his death in 1836. After this time the Camelon distillery was run by Thomas Gunn and his father. In 1840, the Gunn's were approached by James Rankine to either buy or lease the Camelon distillery maltings (on the east bank of the canal) where he set up a new distillery under the Rosebank name. The new Rosebank quickly grew, requiring expansion in 1845 and rebuilding in 1864. Indeed in 1861 when Camelon Distillery went bankrupt, Rankine was able to purchase it as well and demolish it, leaving only the maltings for the use of Rosebank.

In 1886, the distillery was visited by Alfred Barnard, who noted that it was set across two sites one on each side of the canal with a swing bridge linking the pair. The malt was produced in the former Camelon maltings on the west side of the canal, then would be transferred over to the distillery on the east side by means of the swing bridge. He also noted that their warehouse at the time had storage for 500,000 gallons (1,892,705.9 litres)

Rosebank Distillery Ltd was formed in 1894, and in 1914 it was among the companies that amalgamated to form the Scottish Malt Distillers. In 1925, Scottish Malt Distillers. became part of The Distillers Company (DCL).

Rosebank was once considered one of the premier lowland whiskies but then DCL mothballed the distillery in 1993. The reason given for the mothballing was that its effluent treatment would have required a £2m upgrade in order to comply with European standards of the time, this did not make it commercially viable. At the time of its closure, it still retained many historical features in the production of the whisky, serving almost as a museum.

By 1988, the bonded warehouse for the distillery (on the west bank of the canal) had been sold off and redeveloped, partially becoming a Beefeater Pub and Grill.

In 2002, the distillery buildings and contents were sold to British Waterways by Diageo, and the maltings were demolished to make way for a housing development. In 2008 plans were started to open a new distillery in Falkirk original Rosebank equipment. However over Christmas and New Year 2008/2009, the original Rosebank Stills (along with other equipment) were stolen by metal thieves and were not recovered. Plans for the new distillery continued to develop gaining Scottish Government approval, the new building being near the Laurieston site of the original Rosebank distillery. Despite the suggestion that the new whisky may be produced under the Rosebank name, Diageo – who owned the Rosebank trademark at the time and continued to release limited bottles of original Rosebank whisky – denied this.

In October 2017, Ian Macleod Distillers announced that they had acquired the Rosebank Whisky trademark from Diageo and the site from Scottish Canals in order to re-establish Rosebank Whisky by building a new distillery and re-commencing production in the old style.

In July 2023 production restarted at Rosebank distillery. Rosebank Distillery opened to visitors in July 2024.

== Taste and Reviews ==
Rosebank is similar to other lowland single malts in having a taste associated with fruits, grasses, and particularly flowers, Being casked in oak lends to oak flavourings within the malt as well – the distillery described the nose as "light and distinctive" and the flavour "well balanced". The late writer Michael Jackson, described the whisky as “The finest example of a Lowland malt…” and considered the closure of the distillery “…a grievous loss.” In his "Complete book of Whisky", Jim Murray notes that a previous writer (Note: Brian Murphy in his World Book of Whisky(1978)) could not be taken seriously after making the claim that "none of them [Lowland malts] approaches the sunny majesty of the Highland malts..." – Murray maintains that Rosebank is the "superior Lowlander" and should be ranked in the top five of all Scottish malts.

== Bibliography ==
- Townsend, Brian (2000). Scotch Missed: The Lost Distilleries of Scotland (3 ed.). Neil Wilson Publishing Ltd. ISBN 9781897784976.
- Murray, Jim (1997). Jim Murray's complete book of whisky: the definitive guide to the whiskys of the world (2 ed.). Carlton. ISBN 978-1858684222.
- Gill, Michael (2006). Whisky Today. Trafford Publishing. ISBN 978-1412083287.
- Carruthers, Nicola (10 October 2017). Ian Macleod to revive Rosebank distillery. The Spirits Business.
