= Raising =

Raising may refer to:

- Raising (syntax), a syntactic construction
- Raising (sound change), a sound change
- Raising (metalworking), a metalworking technique
- Barn raising, a community event to erect the wooden framework for a building
- Fundraising, a method of raising money, usually for non-profits and schools

== See also ==
- Raise (disambiguation)
- - Raising Hell (disambiguation)
  - Raising the Bar (disambiguation)
  - Raising the Wind (disambiguation)
