= Tennessee whiskey =

Type of American whiskey

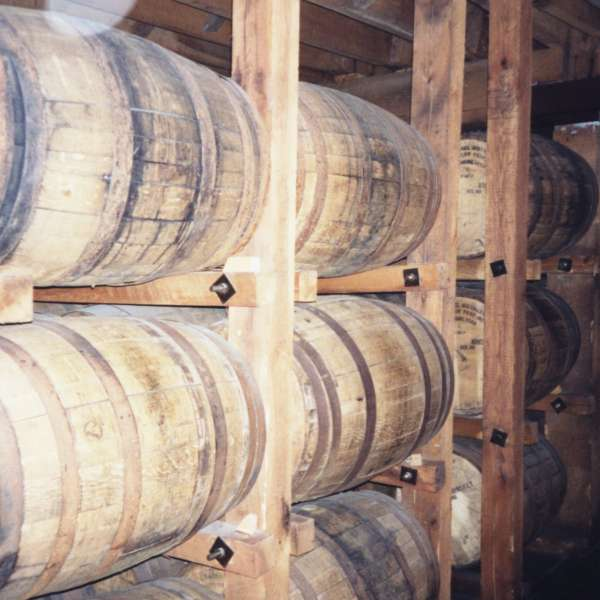
Whiskey being aged at Jack Daniel's Distillery in Lynchburg

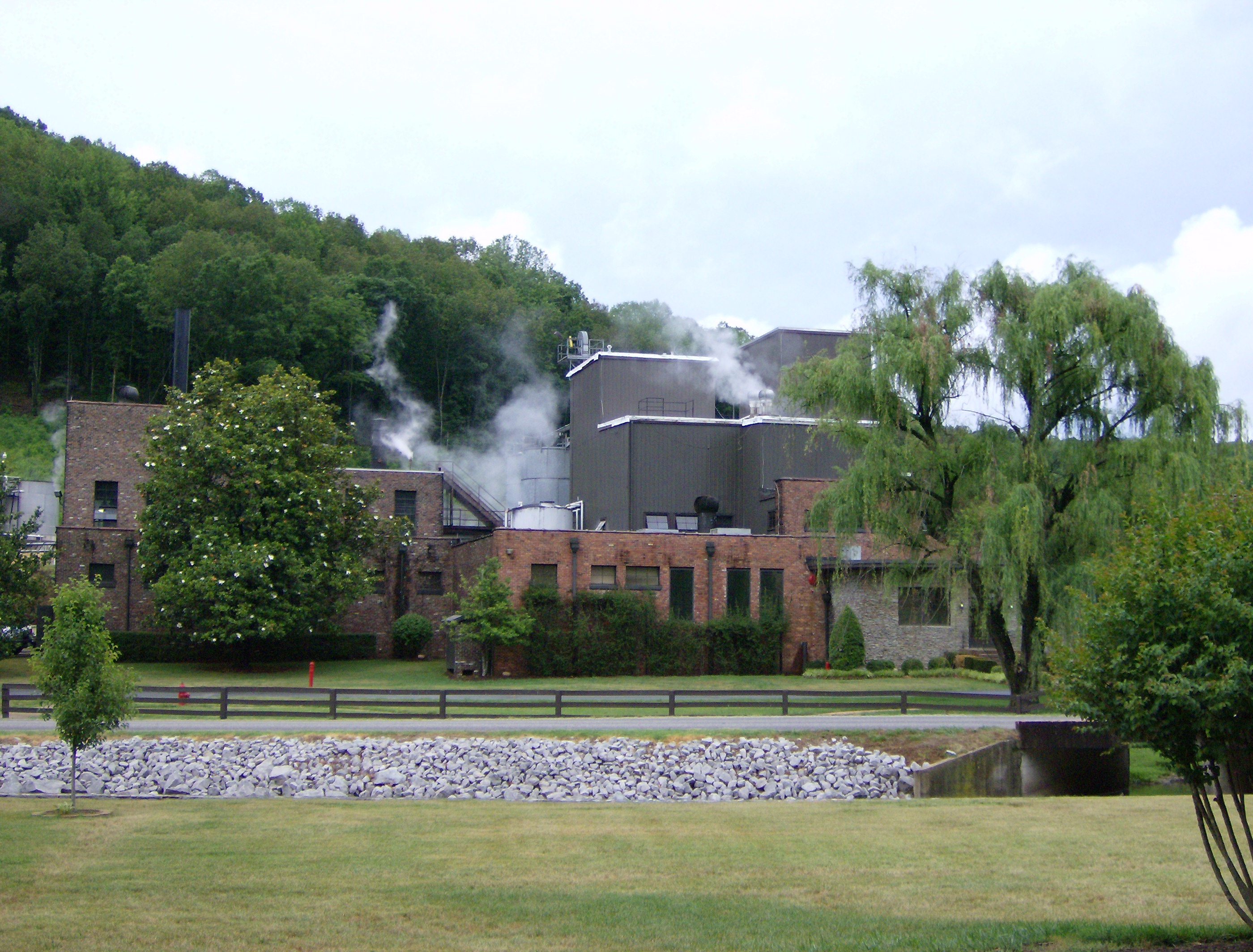
The George Dickel distillery in Tullahoma

Tennessee whiskey is straight whiskey produced in the U.S. state of Tennessee. Although it has been legally defined as a bourbon whiskey in some international trade agreements, most current producers of Tennessee whiskey disclaim references to their products as "bourbon" and do not label them as such on any of their bottles or advertising materials. All current Tennessee whiskey producers are required by Tennessee law to produce their whiskeys in Tennessee and – with the sole exception of Benjamin Prichard's – to use a filtering step known as the Lincoln County Process prior to aging the whiskey. Beyond the perceived marketing value of the distinction, Tennessee whiskey and bourbon have almost identical requirements, and most Tennessee whiskeys meet the criteria for bourbon.

Tennessee whiskey is one of the top ten exports of Tennessee. According to the Distilled Spirits Council of the United States, as of 2013, the U.S. market for bourbon and Tennessee whiskey reached $2.4 billion, and exports of bourbon and Tennessee whiskey grew to exceed $1 billion. There are two major producers of Tennessee whiskey, Jack Daniel's based in Lynchburg (owned by the Louisville-based Brown–Forman) and George Dickel based in Cascade Hollow near Tullahoma (owned by the London-based Diageo), as well as numerous locally based producers throughout the state. In June 2017, the Tennessee Distillers Guild launched the Tennessee Whiskey Trail, a 25-stop distillery tour across the state, to further promote Tennessee whiskey and local whiskey culture.

== History ==
Whiskey production in Tennessee started with the emigration of Scotch-Irish from Pennsylvania and Virginia. President Andrew Jackson served Tennessee whiskey in the White House, a custom continued by James Polk. Filtering of whiskey through maple charcoal was practiced as early as 1825 by Alfred Eaton in Tullahoma, though the process was likely used earlier outside of Tennessee. Jack Daniel's was established as a brand in 1875. By the end of the 19th century, there were over 700 licensed distilleries in the state. Robertson County, which in the 19th century distilled more whiskey than any other county in the state, produced a "distinctive" sour mash whiskey that was said to be "similar to, but not quite the same as, Kentucky bourbon."

Statewide prohibition on the sale and manufacture of alcohol took effect in 1910, wiping out the industry. Following repeal in 1933, Jack Daniel's moved operations back to Lynchburg (the company's attempts at production in Missouri and Alabama did not yield any saleable product) as the first distillery to open post-Prohibition. The next distillery to be licensed in the state, George Dickel, followed in 1958 as a revived brand.

== Lincoln County Process ==
Nearly all Tennessee whiskeys undergo a filtering stage called the Lincoln County Process, in which the whiskey is filtered through (or steeped in) a thick layer of maple charcoal before it is put into new charred oak barrels for aging. The companies that produce whiskey in this manner suggest this step improves the flavor of the whiskey. The filtering process is named for Lincoln County, Tennessee, the home of the Jack Daniel's distillery when it originally began operations. However, in 1871, the boundaries of the county changed, placing the Jack Daniel's distillery and the surrounding area in the newly created Moore County. Ironically, the only whiskey currently produced within the current boundaries of Lincoln County is Prichard's, which is the only Tennessee whiskey that does not use the Lincoln County Process.

== Legal status ==
On a federal level, the definition of Tennessee whiskey is legally established under the North American Free Trade Agreement (NAFTA) and at least one other international trade agreement that requires it to be "a straight Bourbon whiskey authorized to be produced only in the State of Tennessee". Canadian food and drug laws state that Tennessee whiskey must be "a straight Bourbon whisky produced in the State of Tennessee".

On a state level, the State of Tennessee has imposed stringent requirements for Tennessee whiskey. It is not enough under state law that the whiskey be produced in Tennessee; it must also meet specific quality and production standards. On May 13, 2013, Tennessee governor Bill Haslam signed House Bill 1084, requiring the Lincoln County process (which involves maple charcoal filtering) to be used for products produced in the state labeled as "Tennessee Whiskey", along with the existing requirements for bourbon (e.g., mash consisting of at least 51% corn, aging in new charred oak barrels, and limits on alcohol by volume concentration for distillation, aging, and bottling). The law contains a specific exception for Benjamin Prichard's, which does not use the Lincoln County process. As federal law requires statements of origin on labels to be accurate, the Tennessee law effectively gives a firm definition to Tennessee whiskey.

Although Jack Daniel's supported the 2013 legislation – stating it was necessary to bring the quality of Tennessee whiskey to the level of bourbons and Scotches – some of the state's smaller distilleries opposed it, arguing the process required by the law was too close to the process used by Jack Daniel's. Phil Prichard, the owner and distiller of Benjamin Prichard's, said, "If I wanted my whiskey to taste like Jack Daniel's, I would make it like Jack Daniel's." Jeff Arnett, the Master Distiller at Jack Daniel's, noted that stringent requirements were required by Scotch makers in Scotland and champagne makers in France, and Tennessee whiskey should not be treated any differently.

In 2014, legislation was introduced in the Tennessee state legislature to amend the 2013 law to allow the reuse of barrels in the aging process. Diageo, which owns George Dickel, supported the proposed change. Arnett blasted the proposed amendment, going as far as to accuse Diageo of attempting to weaken the quality of Tennessee whiskey to protect its Scotch and bourbon brands. Diageo argued that the 2013 law was an attempt by Jack Daniel's to push smaller competitors out of the market.

Relatively few original brands of Tennessee whiskey exist today, due to statewide prohibition that lasted even longer than national prohibition. As of 2013, many Tennessee counties still prohibit the sale of alcohol. In 2009, the Tennessee General Assembly amended the statute that had for many years limited the distillation of drinkable spirits to just three of Tennessee's 95 counties (Lincoln, Moore, and Coffee). The revised law allows distilleries to be established in 41 additional counties. This change is expected to lead to the establishment of more small distilleries, thus increasing the number of producers of Tennessee whiskey.

== Brands ==
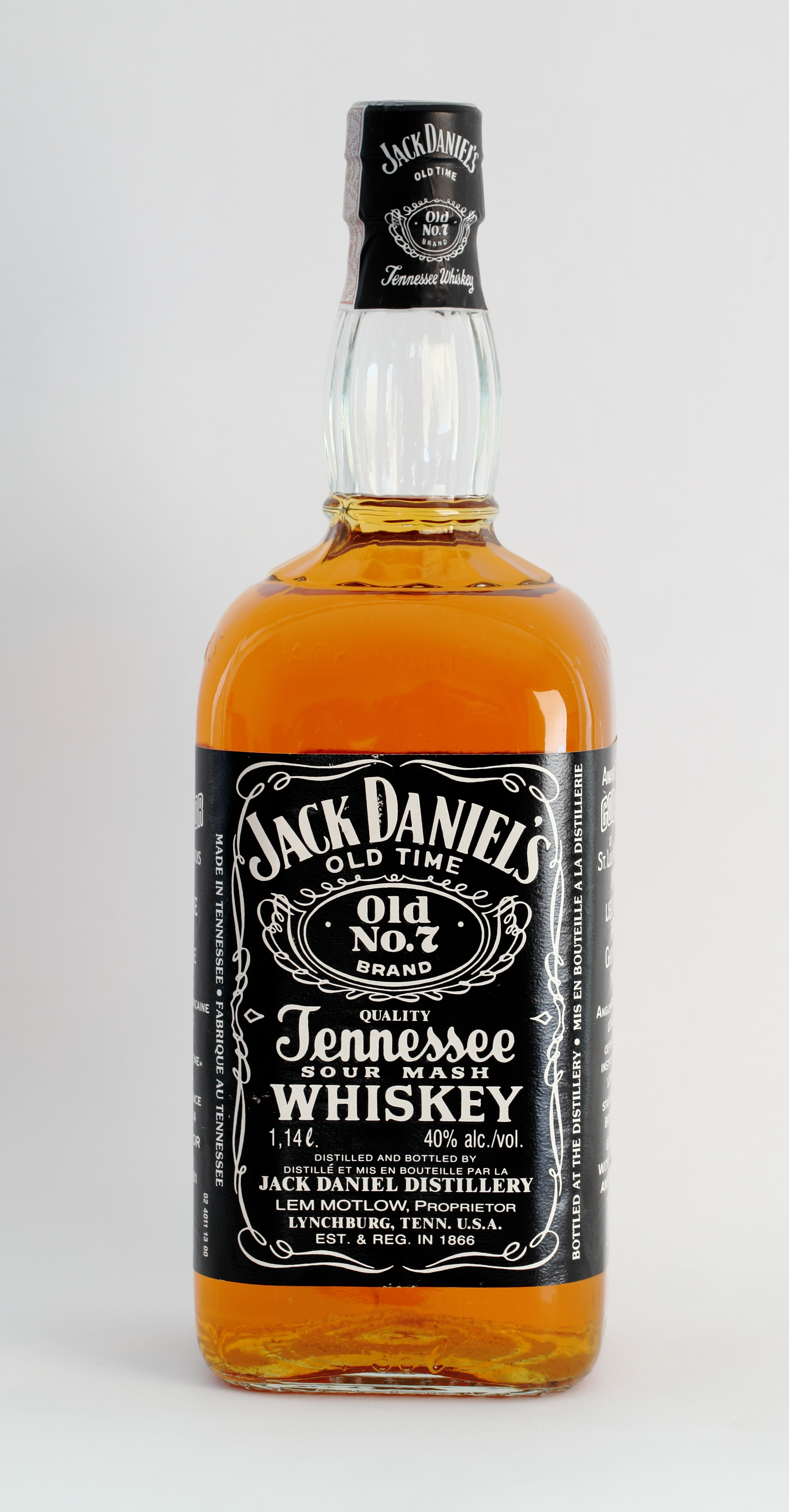
Jack Daniel's Old No. 7

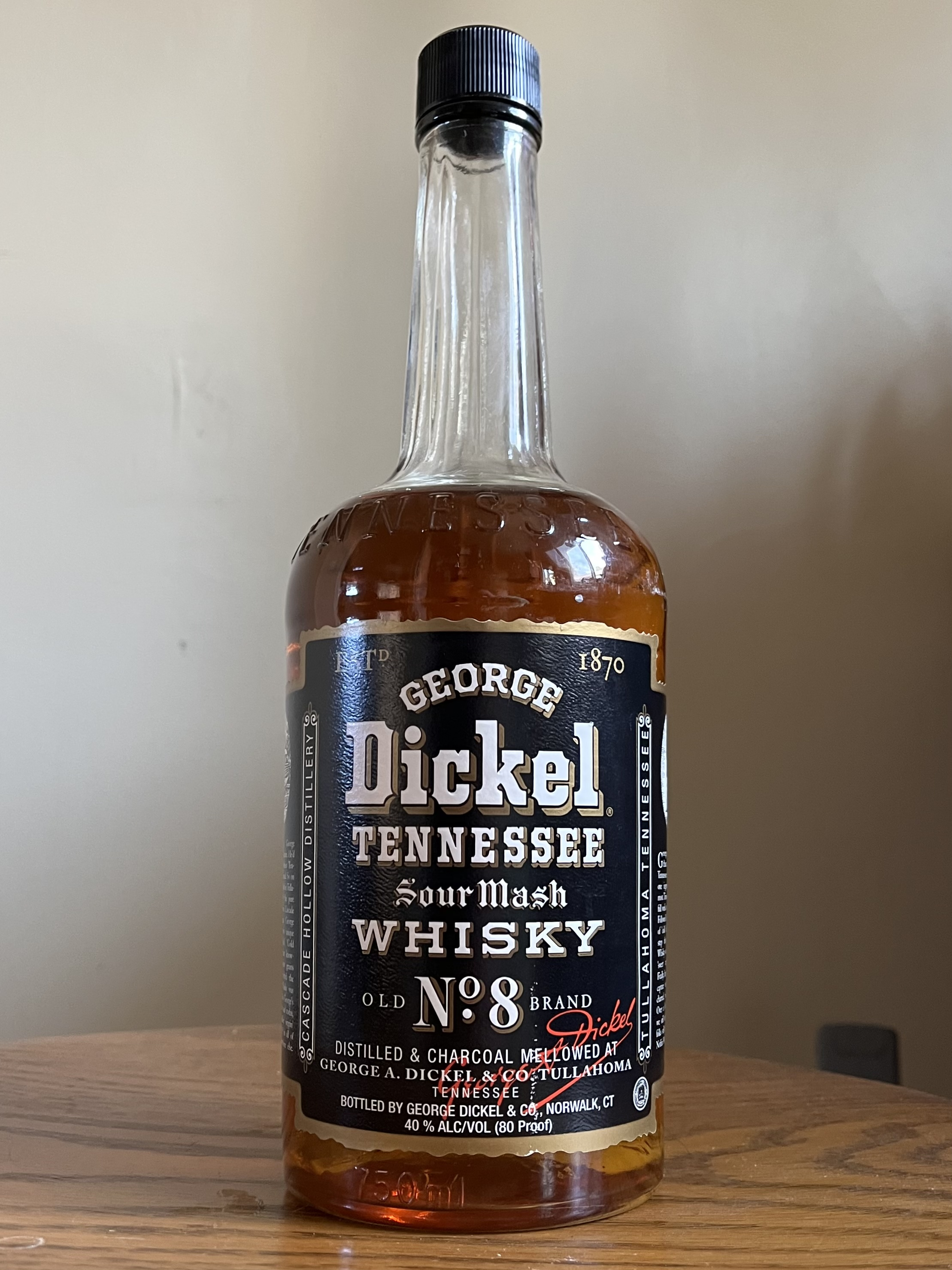
George Dickel Old No. 8

=== Current producers ===
- Benjamin Prichard's from Kelso
- Chattanooga Whiskey Company from Chattanooga
- Collier and McKeel from Nashville
- Farrar Distillery from Noah
- George Dickel (a Diageo brand) from Tullahoma
- Jack Daniel's (a Brown-Forman brand) from Lynchburg
- Nelson's Green Brier Distillery from Nashville
- Uncle Nearest Premium Whiskey, Shelbyville, Tennessee

== Whiskey made in Tennessee that is not "Tennessee whiskey" ==
All Tennessee whiskey is from Tennessee, but not all whiskey from Tennessee is "Tennessee whiskey". For example, the Ole Smoky Distillery (which began operation in 2010) is located in Tennessee and produces several whiskey products, but they are not sold as Tennessee whiskey because they do not meet all the criteria necessary for such. Instead, they are usually marketed under other terms, such as Tennessee moonshine, bourbon whiskey, or simply whiskey.

Chattanooga Whiskey's Tennessee High Malt style of whiskey making generally meet all of the Bourbon requirements for Tennessee Whiskey, however its products do not undergo the Lincoln County filtration process.

George Dickel began production of a rye whiskey in 2012 that also cannot be labeled a Tennessee whiskey because it is produced from a rye-based mash and is not distilled in Tennessee. Most of the stages of its production are conducted under contract in Indiana, and the whiskey is then trucked to the Diageo bottling plant in Plainfield, Illinois, for filtering with charcoal made at the Dickel distillery and then bottling. In early 2014, the brand introduced a white corn whiskey using an unaged version of its standard mashbill, which consists of more than 80% corn, allowing for its sale as "corn whiskey". The bottle makes no reference to Tennessee whiskey. Dickel would go on to release a Bourbon whiskey.

Production began in 2012 of a Jack Daniel's Tennessee Rye. As it is 70% rye, it is not labeled as a Tennessee whiskey. A limited initial release that was not aged in wood was labeled "Spirits Distilled from Grain". A second limited release, called "Rested Rye", was released after two years of aging and labeled a straight rye whiskey. A fully aged version was released in 2017.

As of 2017, Benjamin Prichard's also produces a Tennessee Rye Whiskey, a malt whiskey, two whiskeys labeled as bourbon, and an unaged corn whiskey called Lincoln County Lightning. Like Prichard's Tennessee whiskey, these are not charcoal filtered prior to aging.

As of 2014, Popcorn Sutton's Tennessee White Whiskey was an unaged corn whiskey produced in Tennessee.

== In popular culture ==
Tennessee whiskey is the namesake for the country music song "Tennessee Whiskey", written by Dean Dillon and Linda Hargrove and originally released by David Allan Coe as the title track of his 1981 studio LP. The song was later recorded and released as a hit single by George Jones in 1983. More recently, the song was covered by Chris Stapleton in 2015 on his album Traveller.

== See also ==
- Distillation
- Outline of whisky
