= Raising the Bar =

Raising the Bar may refer to:

== Film and television ==
- Raising the Bar (2008 TV series), an American legal drama television series
- Raising the Bar (2013 TV series), an American reality web series about barmaking
- Raising the Bar (2015 TV series), a TVB drama
- "Raising the Bar" (South Park), a 2012, 16th-season episode of the animated TV series South Park
- "Raising the Bar" (Twenty Twelve), a 2011 television episode
- Raising the Bar (film) a 2015 Australian gymnastics film
- Raising the Bar (film) a 2016 Australian documentary
- Raise the bar (documentary) a 2021 Icelandic documentary

== Other ==
- Raising the Bar (album), a 2018 album by Terri Clark
- FIRST Frenzy: Raising the Bar, the 2004 game for the FIRST Robotics Competition
- Half-Life 2: Raising the Bar, a 2004 coffee table book published by Prima Games
- "Raise the Bar", a song by Australian pop singer Bonnie Anderson
- "Raise the Bar", a 2007 song by Moka Only from Vermilion

== See also ==
- Moving the goalposts
