= Raise =

Raise may refer to:

== Music ==
- Raise!, a 1981 album by Earth, Wind, and Fire
- Raise (album), a 1991 album by Swervedriver
- Raised, a 2022 album by Hailey Whitters

== Place names ==
- Raise, Cumbria, England
- Raise (Lake District), a mountain in the Lake District, England

== Computing and mathematics ==
- Raised to the power of an exponent
- Rigorous Approach to Industrial Software Engineering, a set of tools for software development
- raise, a PL/SQL error-handling command
- raise, a statement in the Python programming language
- RAISE, an error detection and correction technology by SandForce

== Other uses ==
- Raise (mining), a vertical or inclined underground passageway in a mine
- Raise.com, an e-commerce gift card marketplace
- Raise, a betting term used in poker
- Raise, a word sometimes used to refer to an increase in wage or salary
- Rapid Acquisition Imaging Spectrograph Experiment (RAISE), a NASA heliophysics project
- Rebuilding American Infrastructure with Sustainability and Equity (RAISE), a United States federal government program, the short term name of Better Utilizing Investments to Leverage Development (BUILD)

== See also ==
- Raising (disambiguation)
- Ray (disambiguation)
- Relief
