= Collier and McKeel =

Brand of Tennessee whisky

Coordinates: 36.1624°N 86.7819°W

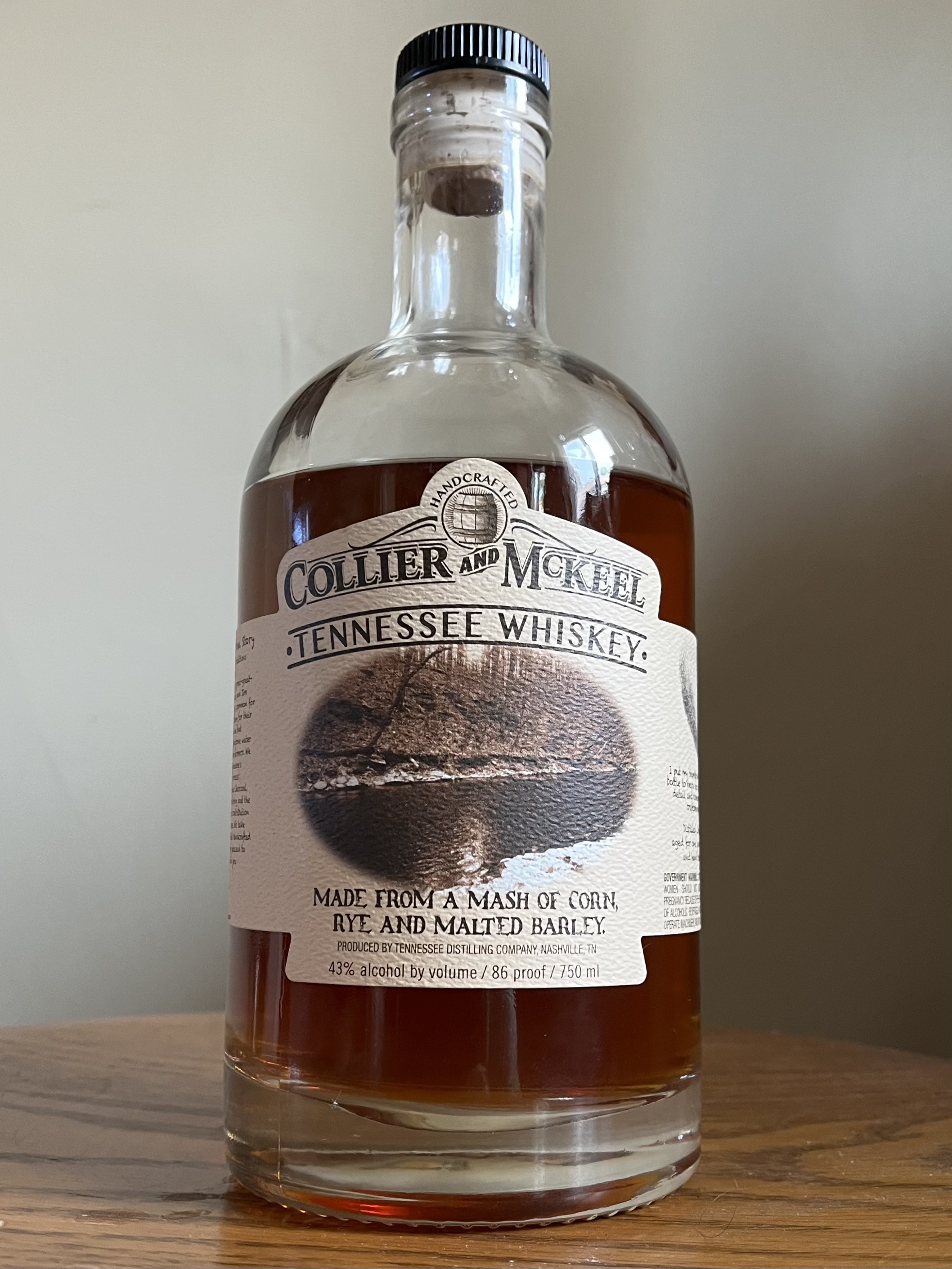
A bottle of Collier and McKeel Tennessee Whiskey

Collier and McKeel is a brand of Tennessee whiskey produced in Nashville. The whiskey was originally distilled by Tennessee Distilling Company, a corporation founded in 2009 in Franklin, Tennessee, by former Tennessee state representative Mike Williams. The brand was sold to North Coast Spirits, a California business group, in 2014, but distillation and other operations remained in Nashville.

== History ==
Collier and McKeel's whiskey history began again when Mike Williams helped pass new legislation that revised Tennessee state laws related to distilling in 2009. Prior to the passing of the bill, alcohol could only be distilled in three Tennessee counties: Coffee, Moore and Lincoln (origin of the Lincoln County Process used to make Tennessee whiskey). He named the brand after two ancestors, William Collier and James McKeel, who had been distillers in the state in the early 1800s.

Williams opened the first Collier and McKeel distillery in the old Marathon Auto Works building (next to Corsair Artisan Distillery), located near the state capitol building in Nashville in 2009. The first distilled whiskeys – aged in 5-US-gallon (19 L) and 15-US-gallon (57 L) barrels – were available for sale in 2011. The original product line consisted of Tennessee whiskey, a cinnamon whiskey, a vodka, and a white dog unaged whiskey – also known as moonshine.

In 2012, Collier and McKeel moved its distillery operations to the Speakeasy Spirits (now Pennington Distilling Co.) complex in West Nashville. Speakeasy used Collier and McKeel Tennessee whiskey in combination with other flavors to create Whisper Creek Tennessee Sipping Cream at a milder 40 proof. Nashville chef Deb Paquette helped create the recipe.

In May 2013, Collier and McKeel signed an agreement with The Vintner Group to expand distribution to parts of the East Coast. The deal made the distillery's whiskey available to liquor stores and restaurants in Maryland, Delaware, Florida and Washington D.C. and designated Rhode Island, New York, Connecticut, New Jersey and Massachusetts in the Northeast and Indiana and Illinois in the Midwest as distribution targets. Mike Williams called the deal a "major move" for the company. In May 2014, he announced the sale of Collier and McKeel to North Coast Spirits.

== Whiskey ==
Collier and McKeel Tennessee Whiskey uses a mash of 70% corn, 15% rye, and 15% malted barley with ingredients obtained from local farms. That includes using limestone-filtered water from Big Richland Creek on Collier Farm (which belongs to the Williams family) in Humphreys County. The whiskey is filtered using the Lincoln County Process — a requirement for all Tennessee whiskeys (except Prichard's) — but Collier and McKeel alters the method slightly by pumping the whiskey slowly through the charcoal instead of using gravity to drip the liquid through the charcoal.

The company originally used small casks for aging but added traditional 53-US-gallon (200 L) barrel sizes for aging in 2013. According to master distiller Mike Williams, "Nothing can take the place of time, but the 15-gallon [57-liter] barrels allowed us to age the whiskey a little more quickly to start." After 2013, the company focused on larger barrels with only limited production of smaller barrel whiskeys. The brand also started using a new label that featured "Pappy," the distillery's 560-US-gallon (2,100 L; 470 imp gal) copper still, Big Richland Creek and a rustic barn. Each bottle included a real thumbprint added by Mike Williams.

Collier and McKeel's unaged white dog whiskey received a silver medal from the American Distilling Institute in 2012 in the Artisan American Spirits category. Wine Enthusiast gave the Collier and McKeel Tennessee Whiskey a score of 92 and rated it Best of Year in 2016.
