= Raising Hell =

Raising Hell may refer to:

- "Raising Hell" (Bullet for My Valentine song), 2013
- "Raising Hell" (Kesha song), 2019
- Raising Hell (album), by Run-D.M.C.
- Raising Hell, an album by Fatback Band
- Raising Hell (Weir and Noyes book), 1983 book by David Weir and Dan Noyes
- Raising Hell (music history book), 2020 book by Jon Weiderhorn
- Raising Hell (video), a concert video by Iron Maiden
- Raising Hell Software, the original name of the British video game studio Bizarre Creations
- Overlord: Raising Hell, an expansion pack to the 2007 video game Overlord
