= National Bourbon Heritage Month =

Observance in the United States for celebration of bourbon whiskey

National Bourbon Heritage Month is an observance in the United States that calls for celebration of bourbon as America's "Native Spirit" during the month of September. On August 2, 2007, the US Senate declared September 2007 as "National Bourbon Heritage Month." The bill, sponsored by Republican Senator Jim Bunning of Kentucky, passed by unanimous consent. The resolution calls for consumers who enjoy bourbon to do so responsibly and in moderation. The bill reinforces the 1964 concurrent resolution of Congress that "recogniz[ed] Bourbon whiskey as a distinctive product of the United States."

It was a resolution for one year, 2007. It needs to be passed again each year, or in a permanent form to be continually officially observed.

== Celebration ==
To celebrate America's Native Spirit and National Bourbon Heritage Month, the city of Bardstown, Kentucky has hosted the Kentucky Bourbon Festival every September since 1991. The festival is dedicated to celebrating the history and art of distilling Bourbon whiskey.
