= Chattanooga Whiskey Company =

American bourbon whiskey producer

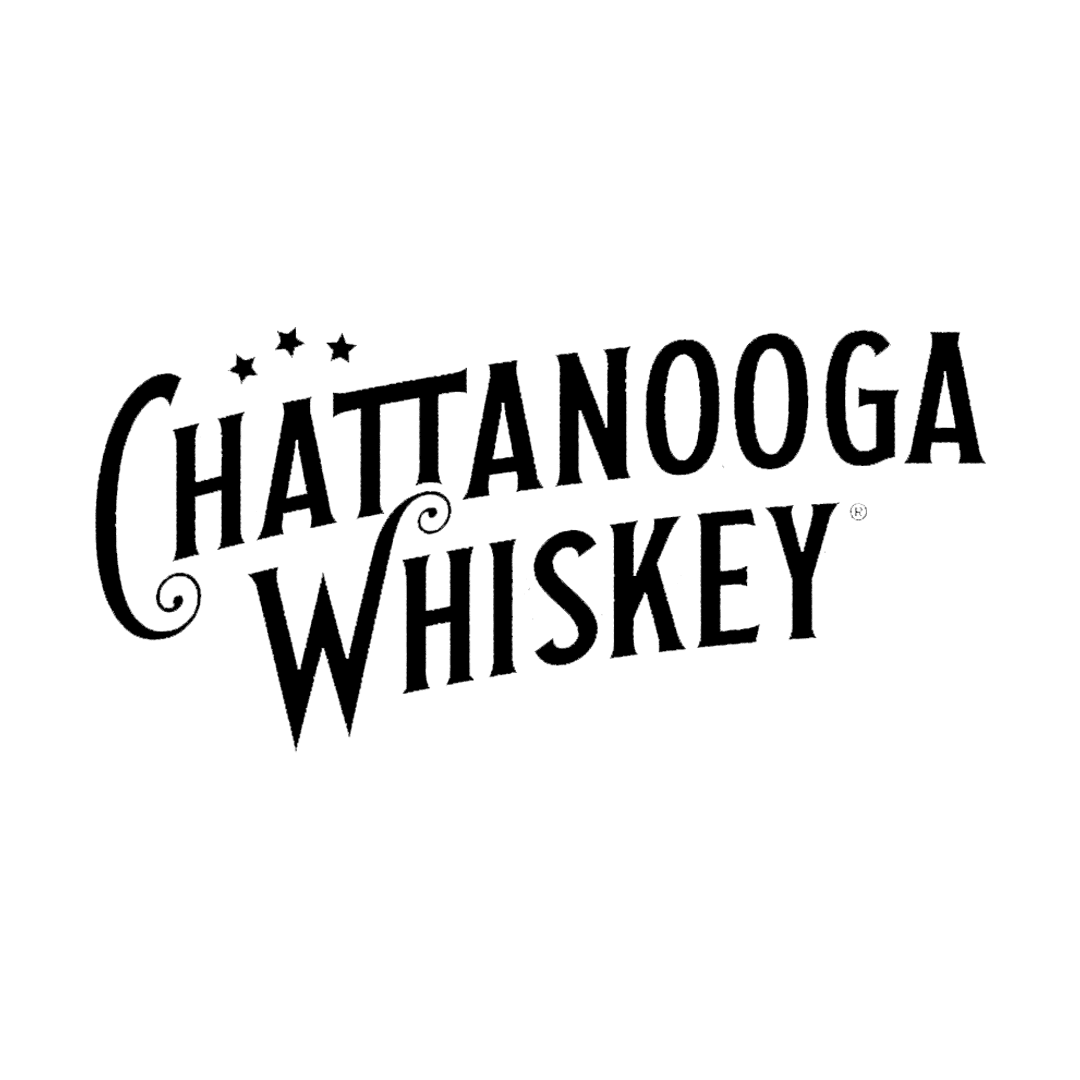

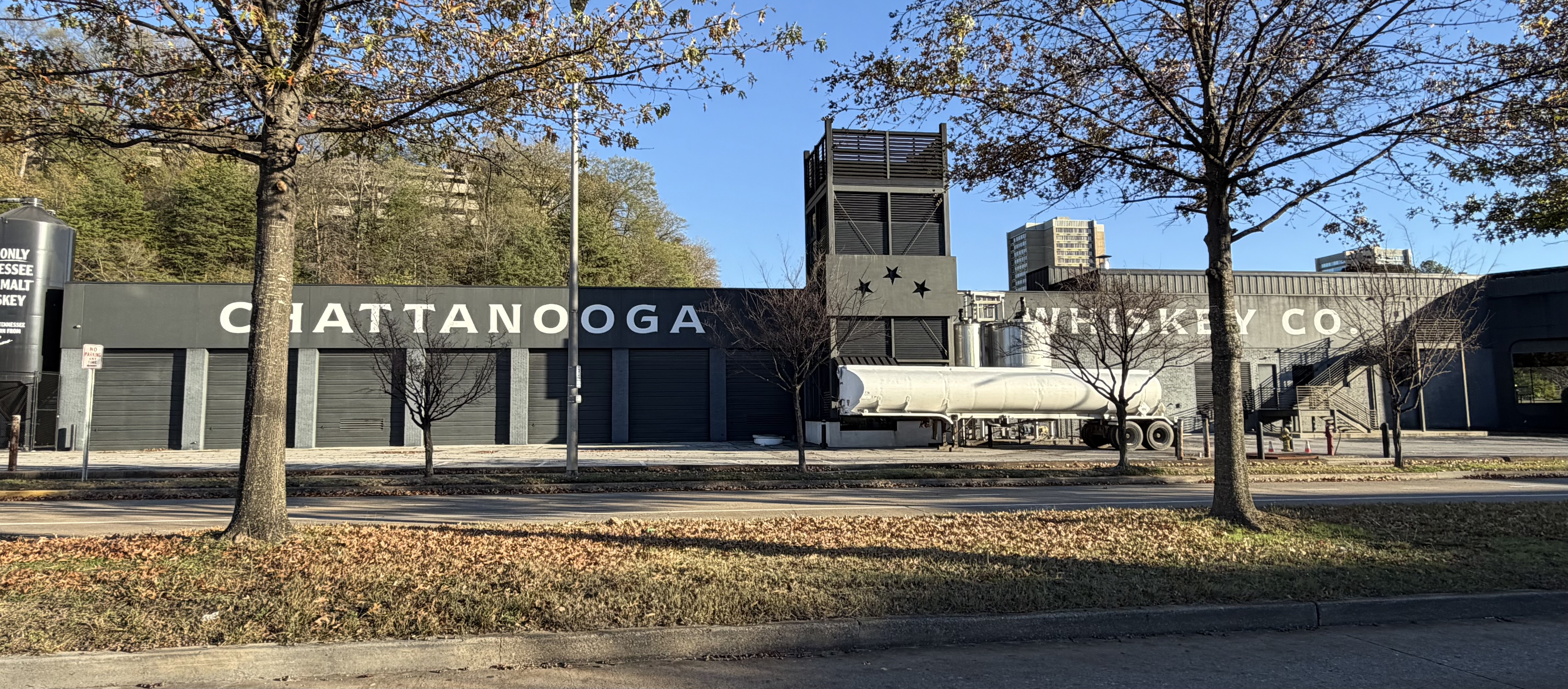
- The Riverfront Distillery in 2025
- Industry: Whiskey
- Founder: Tim Piersant & Joe Ledbetter
- Headquarters: Chattanooga, Tennessee, USA
- Area served: USA
- Brands: 1816 (Reserve, Cask, Single Barrel, Native), Experimental SIngle Batch Series
- Website: chattanoogawhiskey.com

The Chattanooga Whiskey Company is a producer of bourbon whiskey and "Tennessee High Malt" bourbon whiskey, located in Chattanooga, Tennessee. The company was founded by Tim Piersant and Joe Ledbetter. The brand was launched in April 2012, and the company simultaneously announced its intention to help change local distilling laws. The launch met with some initial criticism, primarily due to where the product was made (contract manufactured at MGP/LDI of Indiana), but Hamilton County laws prohibited the manufacture of "intoxicating liquors" at the time. Local public awareness eventually became a catalyst in galvanizing support to change Prohibition-era distilling laws. In March 2015, the company opened the first legal distillery in Chattanooga since Prohibition. The first experimental whiskey, "Batch 001: Tennessee High Malt", was released in August 2017.

The company's production facility and headquarters is located on Chattanooga's riverfront and engages in larger scale production of select recipes created at the experimental facility. The facility began production in 2017 and has made Chattanooga Whiskey one of the largest craft whiskey producers in the state of Tennessee.

== Legislative Precedent, Vote Whiskey Campaign and "Whiskey Bill"/House Bill 102 ==
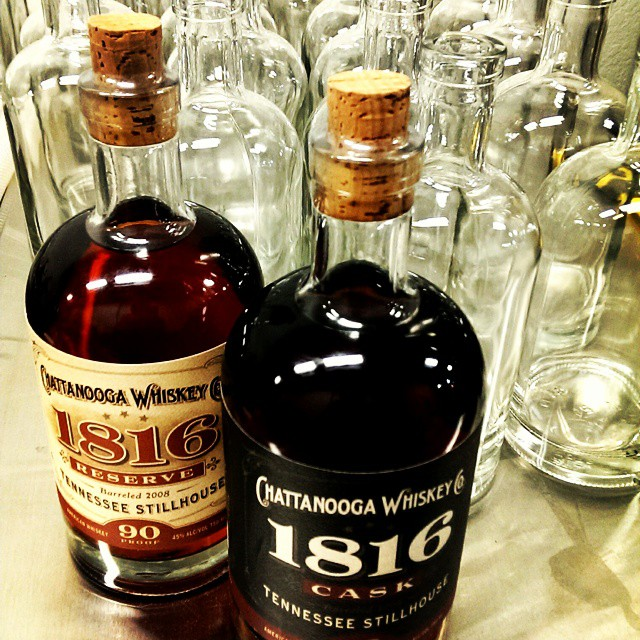
Bottles at Chattanooga Whiskey in Chattanooga, Tennessee, in 2015.

=== 2009 Legislative Precedent, 2012 Vote Whiskey Campaign ===
Prior to 2009, prohibition-era laws limited spirits production to only 3 counties in the state: Lincoln, Moore and Coffee. In 2009, Tennessee lawmakers voted 57–26 in favor of expanding spirits production to counties that already allowed its sale in both retail package sales of liquor and liquor-by-the-drink. Under the new law, 41 additional counties (adding to the 3 existing and out of 95 in Tennessee) began to permit spirit production within their borders. This expansion did not include Hamilton County (Chattanooga, TN). Chattanooga's county, as well as several others, were included in early drafts but were excluded from the bill in a final conference committee when differences were resolved between House and Senate versions of the bill.

By April, 2012, the company began selling their “Chattanooga Whiskey” brand locally and simultaneously started the process of engaging local government, with the goal to eventually manufacture their own Chattanooga Whiskey in Hamilton County. To help this cause, the company began a coordinated, event and social-media driven “Vote Whiskey” campaign, holding many rallies and social events to galvanize public support for the cause.

By late 2012, Piersant and Ledbetter began to challenge the local government more directly, and went as far as seeking input from the Tennessee Attorney General via a formal interpretation of the County Commission resolution, which could potentially permit production. This was put to rest when Attorney General Bob Cooper later confirmed via opinion that Hamilton County commissioners didn't have authority to approve the manufacture of whiskey in the county.

On November 15, 2012, Piersant and Ledbetter presented a pro-economic case to a crowded Hamilton County commission chamber on why local spirits production should be allowed. The local community and local commissioners were largely supportive of the motives and shortly after this courthouse session on November 21, 2012, the Hamilton County Commission voted to adopt a non-binding resolution to the Tennessee General Assembly. This resolution requested the state law to be amended, which would allow the state to include other counties (like Hamilton) into the list of those permitted to independently decide whether or not they would allow distilleries in their borders. This vote passed and paved the way for House Bill 102.

=== House Bill 102 ===
House Bill 102 (nicknamed the “whiskey bill” and sponsored by Joe Carr, R-Lascassas and Bill Ketron, R-Murfreesboro), was initially met with public support and engagement within Hamilton County. The bill eventually found opposition in the weeks leading up to the vote, from a lobbying group under the name, “Let Hamilton Distill”. The effort - disguised as a like-minded effort to the bill's cause - was aimed at developing multiple amendments to HB 102, thereby making the legislation effectively inoperable. Simultaneously, the group began a petition aimed at getting more than 14,000 qualified voter signatures, which was aimed at triggering a local vote to leave the decision up to voters. If the bill was passed but the signature requirement was achieved, the County Commission would have therefore been obligated by law to set an election on the proposed referendum. If voters voted against the distilling laws in referendum, it would have likely stalled or dissolved efforts to legalize distilling in Hamilton County and other Tennessee counties. Critics of the bill also cited potential ethical conflicts, that the law would benefit Knoxville business associate of Gov. Bill Haslam and make some towns less family-friendly.

Neither attempt at circumventing HB 102 was successful and the bill was passed with 57 House members in favor and 31 opposed. Bill Haslam signed the on May 16, 2013, and it became effective on July 1, 2013. A copy of the bill is framed at the Chattanooga Whiskey Experimental Distillery on Market St. in Chattanooga, TN.

== Company History ==
=== 2011 ===
In November 2011, the launch of Chattanooga Whiskey Company was announced along with a plan to release a first whiskey by early 2012. Because it was illegal at the time to distill spirits in Chattanooga, the company revealed it would sell whiskey distilled in Lawrenceburg, Indiana, and bottled in Nashville, Tennessee. Co-founders Tim Piersant and Joe Ledbetter expressed interest in the process for changing the county's distilling laws.

=== 2012 ===
In April 2012, the company announced the release of two locally inspired whiskeys: 1816 Reserve and 1816 Cask. The 1816 in the name comes from the year a trading post was set up by the river in the area that eventually became Chattanooga. Both have the same mash bill of 75% corn, 21% rye, and 4% malted barley, but the Reserve is 90 proof compared to 113.6 proof for the Cask.

On November 15, 2012, Piersant and Ledbetter presented a pro-economic case to a crowded Hamilton County commission chamber to show the benefits of local spirit production. The local community and local commissioners were largely supportive, and shortly after the courthouse session – on November 21, 2012 – the Hamilton County Commission voted to adopt a non-binding resolution for the Tennessee General Assembly.

=== 2013 ===
In 2013, the founders launched the "Vote Whiskey" campaign to promote the legalization of distilling in Hamilton County. In March, the company announced plans to build a distillery on Fort and 14th Streets, on the south side of Chattanooga, pending the passing of House Bill 102 to allow legal distilling in the county. The 30,000-square-foot property was the original site of the Turnbull Cone Machine Company in 1910 and is on the National Register of Historic Places. The estimated cost for the project was $2 million.

In May 2013, House Bill 102 – nicknamed the "whiskey bill" and sponsored by Joe Carr, R-Lascassas and Bill Ketron, R-Murfreesboro – was signed by Governor Bill Haslam, allowing Chattanooga Whiskey to begin the process of building the first legal distillery in Hamilton County in a century. The plan to build at the previously announced location fell through, and in October 2013, the company announced plans for a different distillery location on the corner of 4th and Broad Streets in downtown Chattanooga. The 60,000-square-foot property known as the John Ross Building was estimated to be a $6 million investment. Construction delays were announced in March 2014, and the location was abandoned in September 2014 due to structural and logistical issues.

=== 2014 ===
In April 2014, the parent company of Chattanooga Whiskey – Tennessee Stillhouse – launched Freedom Moonshine. This brand is no longer produced.

In July, co-founder Joe Ledbetter announced he was resigning from the company, citing personal and professional reasons.

In September, after deciding not to renovate the John Ross Building for the distillery, the company announced a plan to open a 100-gallon micro-distillery across from the historic Chattanooga Choo Choo. The site included research and development operations for the brand and served as a tour and tasting location for the public.

In December, the company announced the hiring of Grant McCracken as its head distiller. McCracken had previously worked as Head Brewer of R&D at Samuel Adams in Boston, Massachusetts, and he came on board in the midst of the micro-distillery build out.

=== 2015 ===
Work on the 2,500-square-foot micro-distillery began at the end of 2014 and concluded in March 2015. The grand opening for the location – originally called Tennessee Stillhouse Micro Distillery – took place on March 24, 2015, with the initiation of both tours and distilling operations. The distillery was named one of Southern Living's "50 Best Places in the South" in its first year. In March 2017, this location was renamed Chattanooga Whiskey Experimental Distillery.

In August 2015, Tennessee Stillhouse launched Dr. Thacher's Cocktail Syrups, a joint venture between Tennessee Stillhouse and Pure Sodaworks to produce a series of non-alcoholic, pre-mixed syrups for making common whiskey cocktails.

In November, the company released its first whiskey called Chattanooga Whiskey 100, a white Tennessee malted bourbon. The 100 in the name refers to the century that passed before it became legal again to distill whiskey in Chattanooga. Additionally, the whiskey is 100 proof, and only 100 cases were produced. The company had more than 50 experimental whiskeys aging by the end of 2015.

=== 2016 ===
In April 2016, Chattanooga Whiskey won a series of awards for its 1816 line of straight bourbon whiskeys. At the 2016 San Francisco World Spirit Awards, the 1816 Reserve won Double Gold for small batch bourbon, and the 1816 Cask won Gold in the same category. At the American Distilling Institute Spirit Competition, the 1816 Cask won Gold for straight bourbon. At the International Whisky Competition, the 1816 Cask won Gold for "Best Bourbon Whiskey", and the 1816 Reserve won Gold for "Best Small Batch Bourbon".

In July, the company announced plans to open a larger, 46,000-square-foot production facility on the corner of Riverfront Parkway and Martin Luther King Boulevard in the historic former Newton Chevrolet car dealership. Construction activities on this property began in late July 2016 and were completed in March 2017.

=== 2017 ===
In March 2017, the new facility opened on Riverfront Parkway with 15,000 square feet of barrel storage space (enough for 4,000 53-gallon white oak barrels), 3,000 square feet of office space, and 5,000 square feet of event space for approximately 300 guests. The company held a launch party for the public at the facility in December, but there are no plans to offer tours or public access at this location at this time. Tours are conducted at the original micro-distillery location on the south side.

In August 2017, the company announced the release of its first aged Chattanooga whiskey as part of the Experimental Single Batch Series. Batch 001 was a "Tennessee High Malt", and 228 cases were produced. This style has now become a focus for the brand, as many of its experimental whiskeys have used "high malt" phrasing.

In October, the 1816 line was extended to include the Native Series, the result of a collaborative partnership between Chattanooga Whiskey and six local breweries – Terminal Brewhouse, Hutton & Smith Brewing Company, Moccasin Bend Brewing Company, OddStory Brewing Company, Big River Brewing Works, and Chattanooga Brewing Company – and one Nashville brewery, Yazoo Brewing Company. The Native Series whiskeys are finished in casks previously used to age different style beers from each brewery. The distillery plans to produce new batches of the Native Series every year.

In November, the company released Batch 002 and Batch 003 in the Experimental Series. Batch 002 is a smoked high malt, while Batch 003 is a native barrel whiskey because of its aging in smoked beer barrels previously used to age the Native Series.

For 2017, Chattanooga Whiskey production demand was about 10,000 cases for products that are available in Tennessee, South Carolina, and Georgia. Actual production before opening the new riverfront location was only about 2,500 cases a year out of the microdistillery, leading the distillery to source bourbon from an Indiana distillery to meet the 10,000-case volume in the past. The new location will increase distillery production to 14 barrels per day versus one barrel per week at the micro-distillery location.

=== 2018 ===
In February 2018, the company released three additional experimental whiskeys: Batch 004, Batch 005, and Batch 006. Batch 004 is Scottish-style high malt, Batch 005 is a wheated high malt, and Batch 006 is a beer-barrel-finished wheated high malt that shared barrels with Hutton & Smith's Wee Heavy Ale. All three whiskeys were bottled at 102 proof.

The next experimental release – available on a very limited basis with only about 60 cases of each whiskey produced – took place in May. Batch 007 is a Tennessee rye malt, and Batch 008 is a Tennessee single malt.

At the 2018 San Francisco World Spirits Competition, the company won five medals for its whiskeys and two for its packaging.

=== 2020 ===
Tennessee Rye Malt is released - Chattanooga Whiskey's malt-forward approach to Rye and wins a Whiskey Advocate Top 20 whiskey's of the year award

=== 2021 ===
Bottled in Bond Vintage Series debuts - a single season vintage release, crafted from multiple Tennessee High Maltmash bills.

=== 2022 ===
Founder's 10th Anniversary Blend is released - a blend of 3 straight whiskeys finished in 3 separate solera barrels - each one symbolic of the past, present & future.

=== 2023 ===
Chattanooga Whiskey wins “Icons of Whisky - Craft Producer of the Year” (both America & Global) at Whisky Magazine's 2023 World Whiskies Awards.

== Distillery locations ==
=== Chattanooga Whiskey Experimental Distillery ===
Located at the original site on Market Street, this location was first named Tennessee Stillhouse after the Chattanooga Whiskey parent company of the same name. The distillery opened in March, 2015, at which point all the blending and bottling for 1816 began. This location makes approximately one barrel of whiskey per week on a 100-gallon system with one cooker, three fermenters, and a Vendome hybrid pot/column still.

As the home of the Experimental Single Batch Series and the birthplace of "Tennessee High Malt", the distillery has released 31 unique batches of experimental whiskey since August 2017, most highlighting a high malt style.

=== Chattanooga Whiskey Riverfront Headquarters ===
Located on Riverfront Parkway, this location has become the headquarters and main production facility for the company. The distillery was opened to the public in December, 2017, for an open house event, but is currently only available for private events in the adjacent event hall. The system – made by Vendome – consists of four 2,700-gallon fermenters, a 2,700-gallon cooker, a beer well, a 12-inch, 30-foot continuous column still, and a custom 100-gallon doubler that can produce up to 14 barrels a day when running on a 24-hour shift. The barrelhouse has space for 4,500 53-gallon barrels and houses 3 large, charred solera barrels for finishing. These barrels (4000 gallons, 1645 gallons and 625 gallons in capacity) are used together to create Founder's Anniversary Blend. The facility also has a 4,000-square-foot event hall that is available for private events.
