= Raising the Bar (2013 TV series) =

2013 American reality web series

- Created by: Thom Beers
- Country of origin: United States
- Original language: English
- No. of seasons: 1
- No. of episodes: 6

Production
- Executive producers: Thom Beers, Jeff Conroy, Phil Segal
- Producer: Ben Staley
- Running time: 12 minutes
- Production company: Original Productions

Original release
- Network: Hulu
- Release: February 25 – April 1, 2013

Raising the Bar is an American reality web series which premiered March 4, 2013. The series revolves around a six teams of three people each who must create the best handmade bar which serves at least one shot of George Dickel whiskey, while at the American Royal World Series of BBQ.
