= Lincoln County Process =

Tennessee whiskey production process

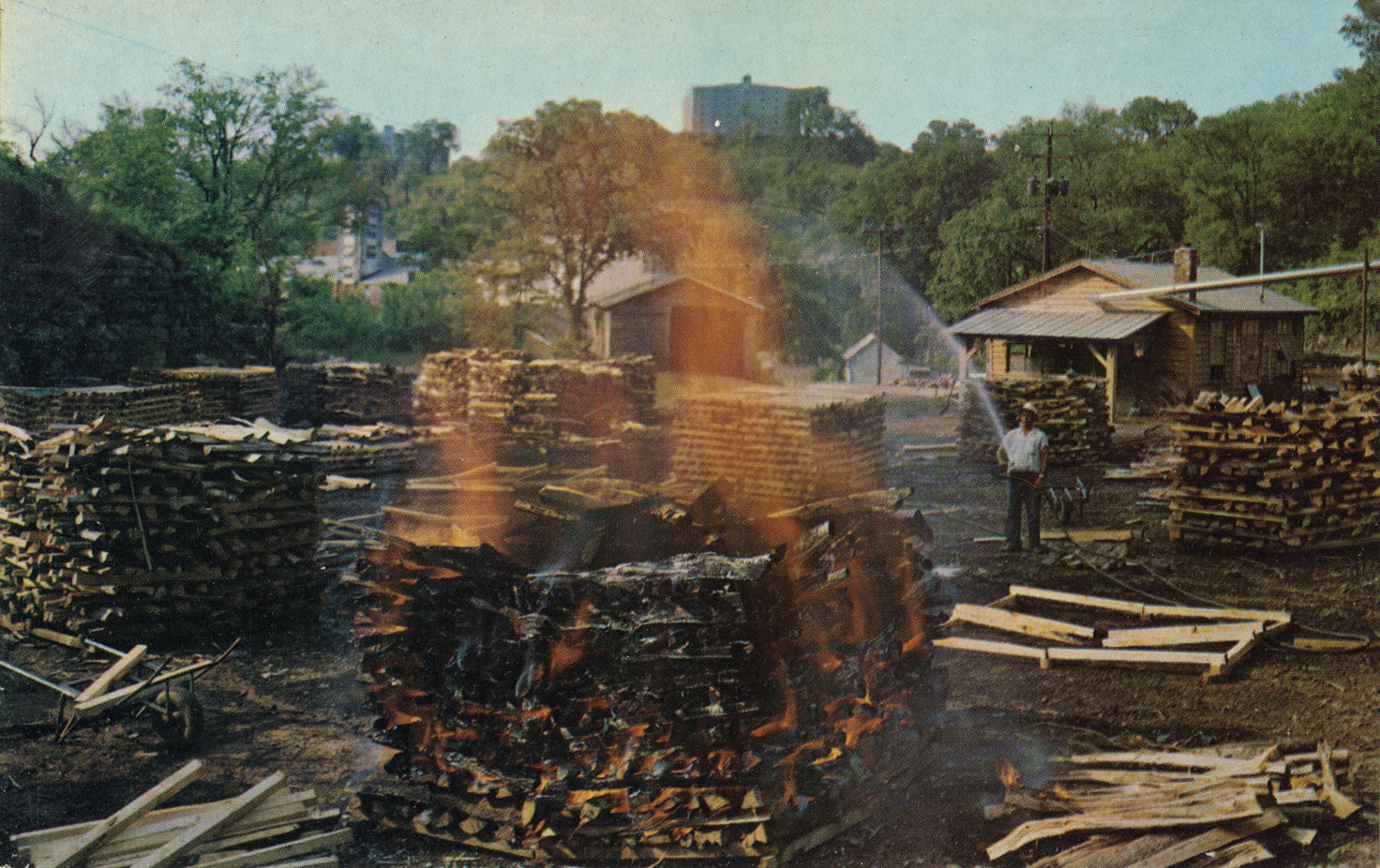
Making charcoal at the Jack Daniel Distillery

The Lincoln County Process is a step used in producing almost all Tennessee whiskeys. The whiskey is filtered through—or steeped in—charcoal chips before going into the casks for aging. The process is named for Lincoln County, Tennessee, which was the location of Jack Daniel's distillery at the time of its establishment, but is no longer used in that county. The only remaining major distillery is Benjamin Prichard's, which does not use the process.

== Origins ==
There is some dispute on the origins of the Lincoln County Process and it is possible that there is no single inventor. For thousands of years, many different cultures have used charcoal as a filter. There is evidence that both the Hindus and the Phoenicians were using charcoal to filter water around 400 BC.

For many years, it was claimed that Alfred Eaton invented the process in 1825. However, the family of William "Billy" Pearson (1761-1844) claim to have documents that Billy sold his recipe for a "smooth sipping whiskey from a corn-mash, filtered through charcoal made from hard sugar-maple wood, and aged in Oak Barrels," to Eaton in 1825. According to the Pearson family, the original recipe was created by Mary Stout Jacocks (b.c. 1715 - d.c. 1816) and that it traveled with the family from New Jersey, to Virginia, and then Pennsylvania where Mary's daughter Tabitha Jacocks Pearson (1734 - 1811) taught the recipe to Billy. Billy took the family recipe to South Carolina and on August 7, 1791 he was kicked out of the Padgett's Creek Baptist Church for making whiskey. In 1812, Billy divorced his wife and moved with his four oldest children to a land he purchased not far from Lynchburg, Tennessee, in Bedford County. It is assumed that Billy farmed the land he purchased and continued to make whiskey until he sold his recipe along with the sugar maple charcoal filtration method to Eaton.

Since 2016, it has been claimed that Nathan "Nearest" Green, the former slave, teacher of Jack Daniel and his eventual master distiller "was the one who decided to cut down sugar maple trees, create charcoal from it and filter his unaged whiskey [through it] before barreling." Proponents of Green as the inventor of the Lincoln County Process propose that he learned the practice of using charcoal to filter water from his ancestors and adapted it to whiskey. They claim that slaves brought the practice to the United States from West Africa where there is a long history of people "using charcoal to filter water and purify their foods". In this scenario, it is assumed that Green would have invented the Lincoln County Process sometime after his birth in 1820 and when he began working for Dan Call as a hired slave distiller around the 1850s.

== Methods ==
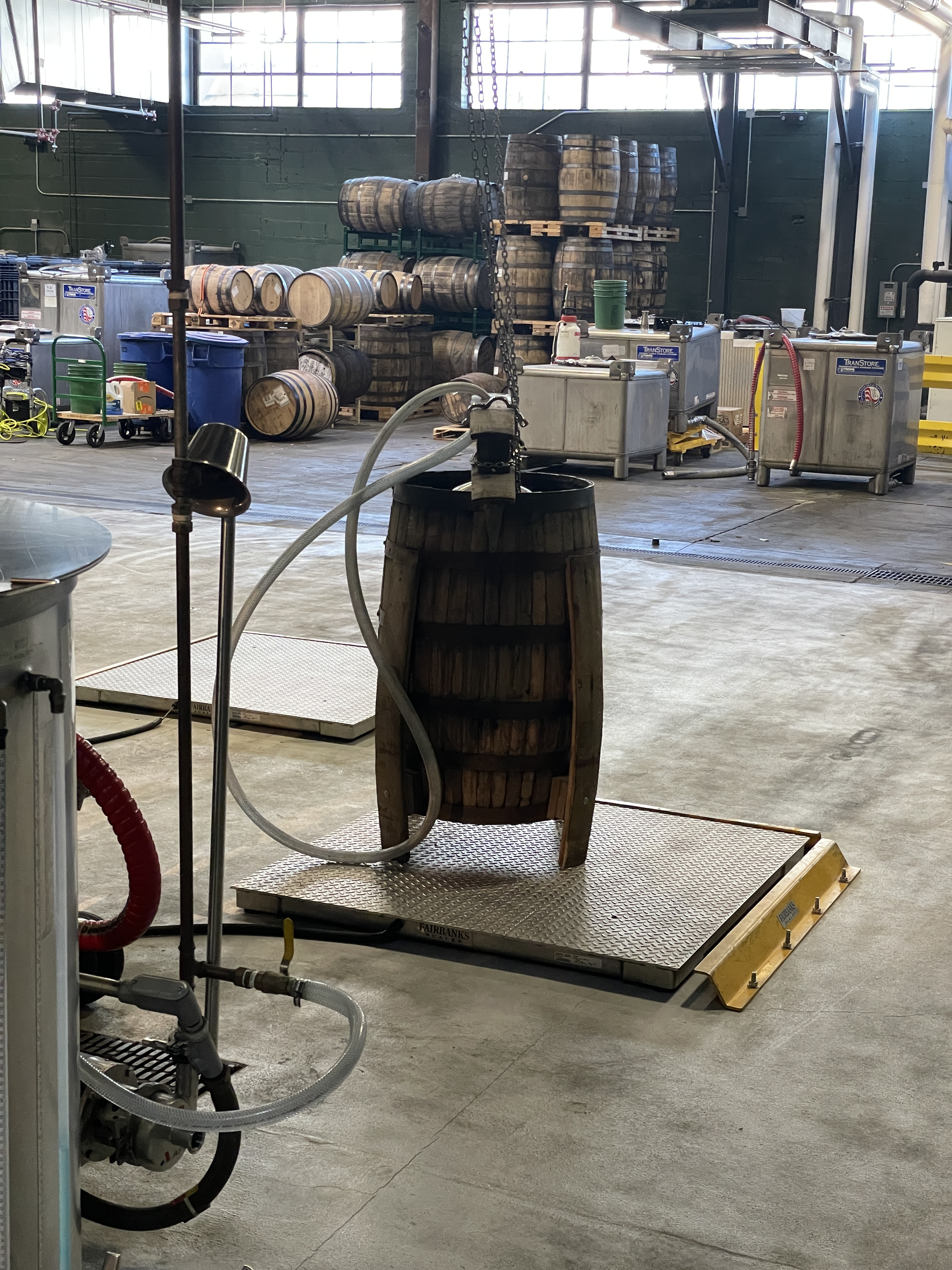
Charcoal filtration system used by the Nelson's Greenbrier Distillery

Nearly every distillery creating Tennessee whiskey uses maple charcoal filtering, though the actual process for accomplishing this varies by company. In the process, whiskey is filtered through—or steeped in—charcoal chips before going into the casks for aging. The process is named for Lincoln County, Tennessee, which was the location of Jack Daniel's distillery at the time of its establishment, but is no longer used in that county, where the only remaining major distillery is Benjamin Prichard's, which doesn't use the process.

For Jack Daniel's, the charcoal used is created onsite from stacks (ricks) of two-by-two-inch (5 by 5 cm) sugar maple timbers. The timbers are primed with 140 proof (70% ABV) Jack Daniel's and then ignited under large hoods to prevent sparks. Once they reach the char state, the ricks are sprayed with water to prevent complete combustion. The resulting charcoal is then fed through a grinder to produce bean-size pellets that are packed into 10-foot (3.0 m) vats used to filter impurities from the 140 proof whiskey. The whiskey is then reduced with water to 125 proof (62.5%) for aging. The process was taught to Jack Daniel by Nearest Green, the namesake of Uncle Nearest Premium Whiskey.

The George Dickel distillery uses deeper (13-foot [4.0 m]) vats and distills the whisky—the spelling used by Dickel—to 135 proof (67.5%). Dickel chills its whisky to 40 °F (4 °C) before it enters the vats and allows the liquid to fill the vats instead of trickling it through.

Nelson's Green Brier Distillery uses the Lincoln County Process to make its signature Tennessee Whiskey and its white whiskey.

Collier and McKeel, made in Nashville, uses a method that pumps the whiskey slowly through 10–13 feet (3–4 m) feet of sugar maple charcoal (instead of using gravity) made from trees cut by local sawmills.

== Legal considerations ==
To be labeled as a straight whiskey, no flavoring or coloring compounds can be added to the spirit after the fermenting of the grain.

Some producers claim that according to a 1941 Internal Revenue Service ruling issued at the request of Jack Daniel Distillery, the Lincoln County Process is what distinguishes "Tennessee whiskey" from "bourbon". However, not all producers of products labeled as Tennessee whiskey use the process. (Specifically, it is not used in the production of Benjamin Prichard's Tennessee Whiskey.)

The term "Tennessee whiskey" does not actually have a legal definition in the U.S. Federal regulations that define the Standards of Identity for Distilled Spirits. The only legal definition of Tennessee whiskey in U.S. federally recognized legislation is the North American Free Trade Agreement (NAFTA), which states only that Tennessee whiskey is "a straight Bourbon Whiskey authorized to be produced only in the State of Tennessee". This definition is also recognized in the law of Canada, which states that Tennessee whiskey must be "a straight Bourbon Whiskey produced in the State of Tennessee". None of these regulations requires the use of the Lincoln County filtering process (or any other filtering process).

On May 13, 2013, the governor of Tennessee signed House Bill 1084, requiring maple charcoal filtering to be used for products produced in the state labeling themselves as "Tennessee whiskey" (with a particular exception tailored to exempt Benjamin Prichard's) and including the existing requirements for bourbon. As federal law requires statements of origin on labels to be accurate, the Tennessee law effectively gives a firm definition to Tennessee whiskey.
