= David Weir (journalist) =

David Weir is a journalist, author, and co-founder and former Executive Director of the Center for Investigative Reporting.

He has written for publications including The Economist, HotWired, L.A. Weekly, Mother Jones, The Nation, New West, New York Magazine, The New York Times, Rolling Stone, Salon.com, San Francisco Chronicle, and the San Francisco Examiner.. While at Rolling Stone, Weir and Howard Kohn revealed the "Inside Story" of Patty Hearst's odyssey while she was underground, following her kidnapping by the Symbionese Liberation Army. Other investigative pieces included FBI surveillance scandals involving the Black Panther Party, the American Indian Movement, and, in 1977, the first article leading to his best-selling book, Circle of Poison.

He was an editor at SunDance Magazine, Rolling Stone, California Magazine, Mother Jones, the Stanford Social Innovation Review, and, in 2001, was the founding editor of 7x7 Magazine in San Francisco. He was a content executive at Wired Digital, Salon.com, and Excite@Home. He was Editor in Chief at Keep Media, (which became MyWire) from 2005 to 2007, and held the same title at Predicify (2008–09). While in college, he was the sports editor of the Michigan Daily at the University of Michigan, and a stringer for UPI.

Weir taught at the UC Berkeley Graduate School of Journalism from 1985 to 1999, and was the Lorry I. Lokey visiting professor in professional journalism at Stanford University from 2002 to 2005.

He is a member of the editorial board of The Nation Institute. He is also a judge, in 2008, for Alternet, the Society of Professional Journalists, and PEN USA.

== References to David Weir ==
Weir is discussed in the book "Sticky Fingers: The Life and Times of Jann Wenner and Rolling Stone Magazine" in many sections. One where it states Wenner could be snobbish, but not when it came to great writers like Weir. Then later it said that Weir was fired for Jann's limo when the company moved to New York.

Weir was KQED's senior editor for digital news, and often wrote about the Giants.

== Published works ==
=== Books ===
- Weir, David and Mark Schapiro. Circle of Poison: Pesticides and People in a Hungry World (Food First Books) February 1981) ISBN 978-0-935028-09-6 Describes the international marketing of pesticides banned in the United States and incidences of pesticide poisoning in farm workers and through the exportation of contaminated foods.
- Weir, David and Dan Noyes. Raising Hell: How the Center for Investigative Reporting Gets the Story (Addison-Wesley Pub Co, 1983: 1983) ISBN 0-201-10859-3.
- Weir, David. The Bhopal Syndrome: Pesticides, Environment and Health ISBN 978-0-87156-718-5 (Sierra Club Books, 1987) Discusses the disaster at Bhopal, India in the context of a global syndrome that puts countless lives at risk; proposes measures to reduce unnecessary risk.
