= Kelso, Tennessee =

- Unincorporated community
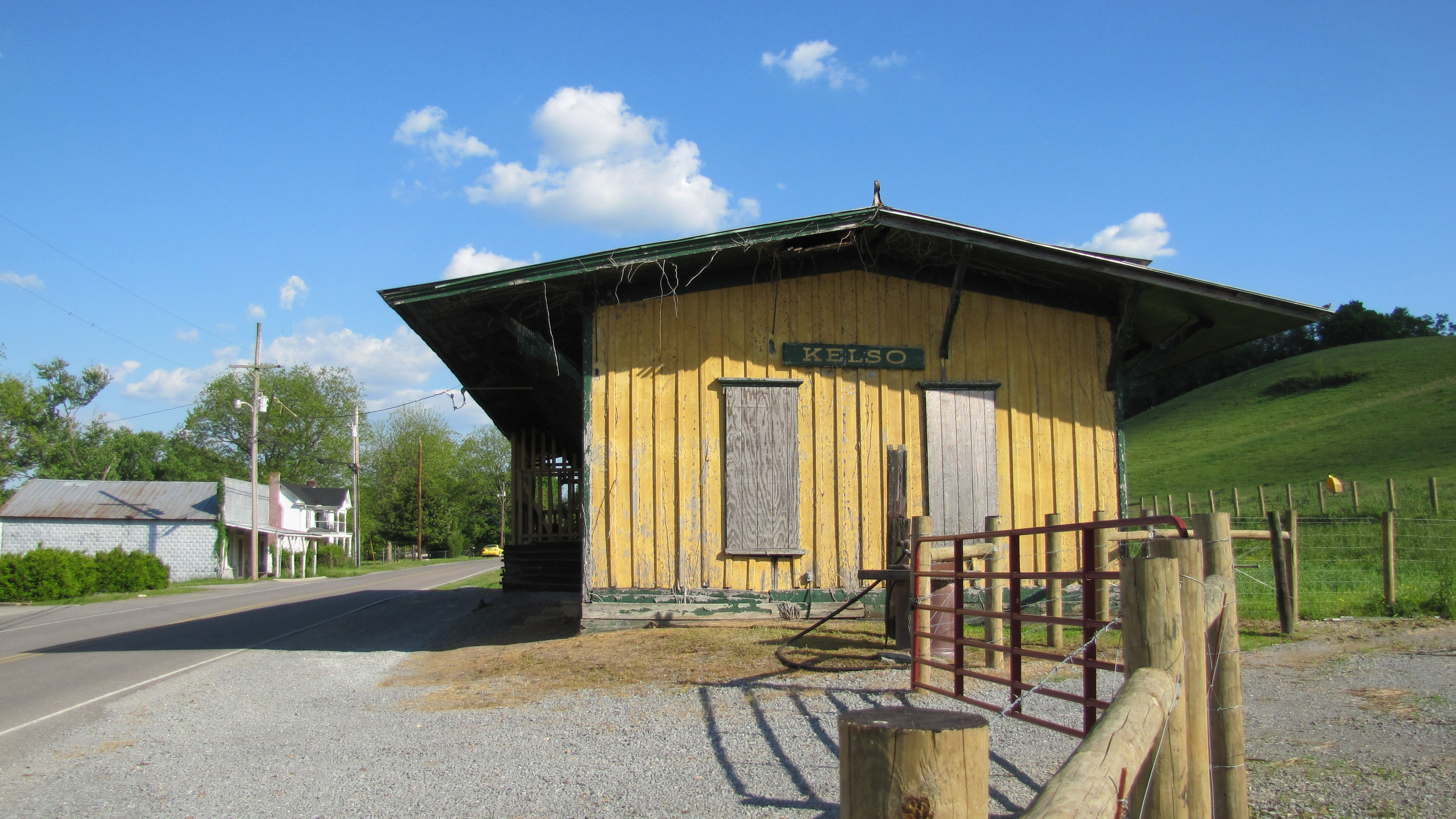
- The old Kelso Depot, with Teal Hollow Road on the left

- Location within Tennessee Location within the United States
- Coordinates: 35°07′33″N 86°28′07″W
- Country: United States
- State: Tennessee
- County: Lincoln
- Elevation: 751 ft (229 m)
- Time zone: UTC-6 (Central (CST))
  - Summer (DST): UTC-5 (CDT)
- ZIP code: 37348
- Area code: 931
- GNIS feature ID: 1290051

Kelso is an unincorporated community in Lincoln County, Tennessee, United States. Kelso is located along U.S. Route 64 6 miles (9.7 km) east-southeast of Fayetteville. Kelso has a post office with ZIP code 37348. The community is home to the original Benjamin Prichard's distillery.
