= Bourbon whiskey =

American whiskey

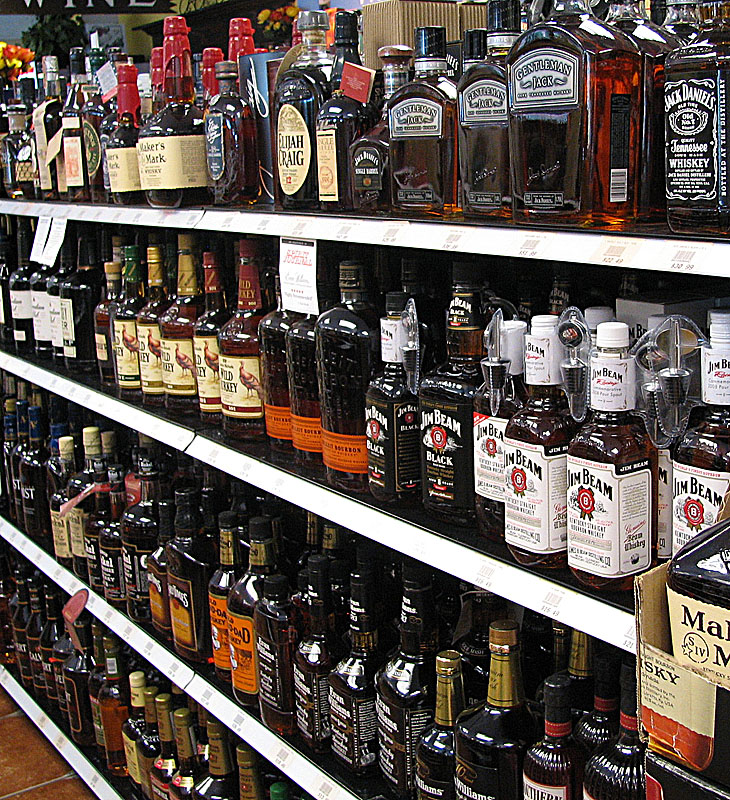
- A selection of bourbons and Tennessee whiskeys at a Decatur, Georgia liquor store
- Type: American whiskey
- Origin: United States, Southern United States, mainly Kentucky
- Introduced: 18th century
- Alcohol by volume: At least 40% bottled
- Proof (US): At least 80° bottled
- Color: Amber, orange, red or brown
- Ingredients: at least 51% corn
- Related products: Corn whiskey, straight whiskey, Tennessee whiskey

Bourbon whiskey (/ˈbɜːrbən/; also simply bourbon) is a barrel-aged American whiskey made primarily from corn (maize). The name derives from the French House of Bourbon, although the precise source of inspiration is uncertain; contenders include Bourbon County, Kentucky, and Bourbon Street in New Orleans, both of which are named after the House of Bourbon. The name bourbon might not have been used until the 1850s, and the association with Bourbon County was not evident until the 1870s.

Although bourbon may be made anywhere in the U.S., it is associated with the Southern United States, particularly Kentucky, through a history of advertising bourbon as a product of Kentucky with rural, Southern origins. Thanks to a market shift in the 1990s, it has also become a symbol of urbanization and sophistication, with a large consumer demographic belonging to the middle- to upper-class, including business and community leaders.

After World War II, a boom in bourbon consumption and exports occurred. Bourbon was recognized in 1964 by the U.S. Congress as a "distinctive product of the United States". Bourbon sold in the U.S. must be produced within the U.S. from at least 51% corn and stored in a new container of charred oak.

Bourbon has been distilled since the 18th century. As of 2014, distillers' wholesale market revenue for bourbon sold within the U.S. was about $2.7 billion, and bourbon made up about two thirds of the $1.6 billion of U.S. exports of distilled spirits. According to the Distilled Spirits Council of the United States, in 2018 U.S. distillers derived $3.6 billion in revenue from bourbon and Tennessee whiskey (a closely related spirit produced in the state of Tennessee).

== History ==
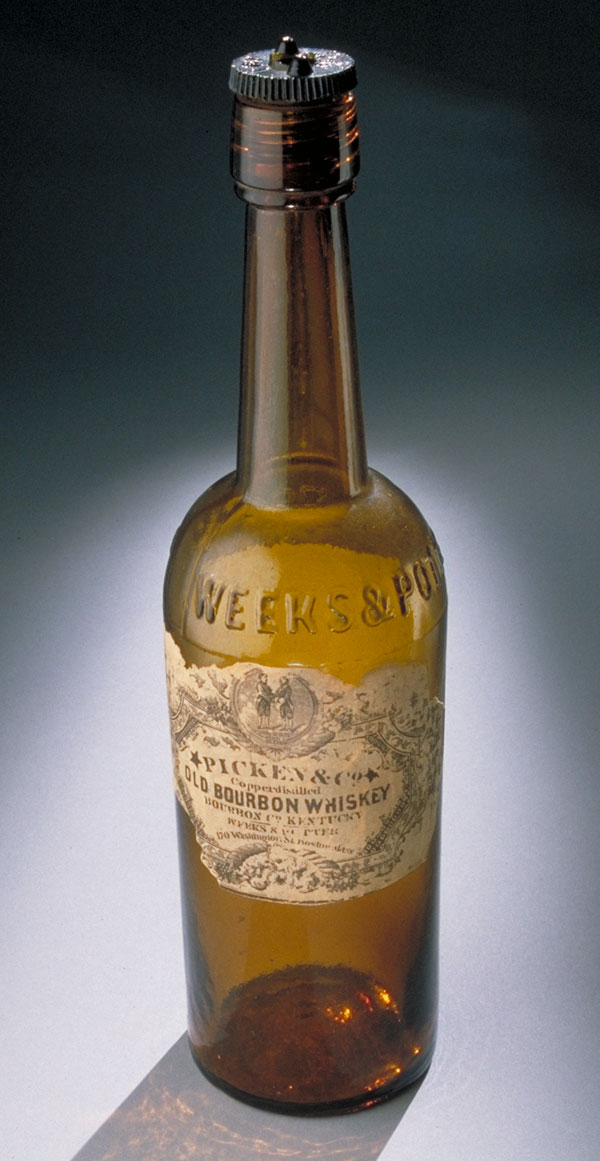
Nineteenth century bourbon bottle

Distilling was most likely brought to present-day Kentucky in the late 18th century by Scots, Scots-Irish, and other settlers (including English, Irish, Welsh, German, and French) who began to farm the area. The origin of bourbon as a distinct form of whiskey is not well documented and there are many conflicting legends and claims. For example, the invention of bourbon is often attributed to Elijah Craig, a Baptist minister and distiller credited with many Kentucky firsts (e.g., fulling mill, paper mill, ropewalk) who is said to have been the first to age the product in charred oak casks, a process that gives bourbon its brownish color and distinctive taste. In Bourbon County, across the county line from Craig's distillery in what was then Fayette County, an early distiller named Jacob Spears has been named as the first to label his product as Bourbon whiskey.

Although still popular and often repeated, the Craig legend is apocryphal. Similarly, the Spears story is a local favorite but is rarely repeated outside the county. There likely was no single "inventor" of bourbon, which developed into its present form in the late 19th century. Essentially, any type of grain can be used to make whiskey, and the practice of aging whiskey and charring the barrels for better flavor had been known in Europe for centuries. The late date of the Bourbon County etymology has led historian Michael Veach to dispute its authenticity. He proposes the whiskey was named after Bourbon Street in New Orleans, a major port where shipments of Kentucky whiskey sold well as a cheaper alternative to French cognac.

Another proposed origin of the name is the association with the geographic area known as Old Bourbon, consisting of the original Bourbon County in Virginia organized in 1785. This region included much of today's Eastern Kentucky, including 34 of the modern counties. It included the current Bourbon County in Kentucky, which became a county when Kentucky separated from Virginia as a new state in 1792. Numerous newspaper articles reference whiskey from Bourbon County, Kentucky dating as far back as 1824. According to the whiskey writer Charles K. Cowdery,

When American pioneers pushed west of the Allegheny Mountains following the American Revolution, the first counties they founded covered vast regions. One of these original, huge counties was Bourbon, established in 1785 and named after the French royal family. While this vast county was being carved into many smaller ones, early in the 19th century, many people continued to call the region Old Bourbon. Located within Old Bourbon was the principal port on the Ohio River, Maysville, Kentucky, from which whiskey and other products were shipped. "Old Bourbon" was stencilled on the barrels to indicate their port of origin. Old Bourbon whiskey was different because it was the first corn whiskey most people had ever tasted. In time, bourbon became the name for any corn-based whiskey.

Although many distilleries operated in Bourbon County historically, no distilleries operated there between 1919 and late 2014, when a small distillery opened – a period of 95 years.

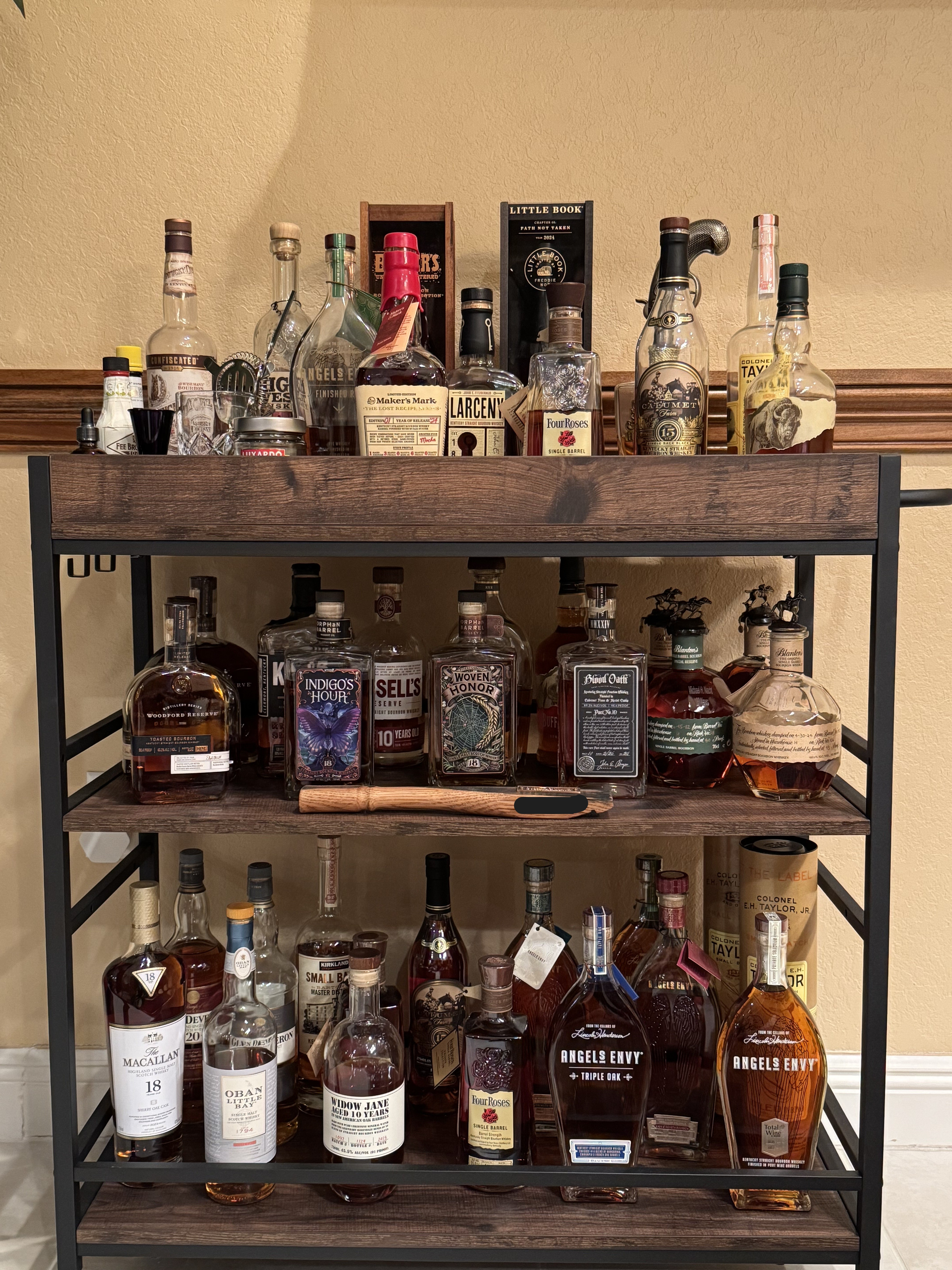
A whiskey cart with a selection of different bourbon whiskey

A refinement often dubiously credited to James C. Crow is the sour mash process, which conditions each new fermentation with some amount of spent mash. Spent mash is also known as spent beer, distillers' spent grain, stillage, and slop or feed mash, so named because it is used as animal feed. The acid introduced when using the sour mash controls the growth of bacteria that could taint the whiskey and creates a proper pH balance for the yeast to work.

Prohibition devastated the bourbon industry. With the ratification of the 18th Amendment in 1919, all distilleries were forced to stop operating. Six companies were granted permits to bottle medicinal whiskey from existing stocks: A. Ph. Stitzel Distillery (later called the Stitzel–Weller Distillery), American Medicinal Spirits (producer of Old Crow and Old Grand-Dad, sold in 1929 to National Distillers, now owned by Suntory Global Spirits), Brown-Forman (still a current major producer), Frankfort Distillery (including the George T. Stagg distillery now called the Buffalo Trace Distillery and owned by Sazerac), James Thompson and Brothers (later called Glenmore Distillery, now owned by Sazerac), and Schenley Distillery (now owned by Guinness). Prescriptions were required to buy medicinal whiskey. In 1928 when stocks ran out, the US government allowed a 100-day "Distillers' Holiday" to the select distillers to replenish the medicinal stock.

After the end of Prohibition at the federal level in late 1933, it continued in various places at the state, county and local level, and liquor sales are still prohibited or restricted in many jurisdictions in Kentucky, the primary bourbon-producing state (and in Tennessee as well, where Tennessee whiskey is made).

Production was shut down completely again in 1941 to reserve production capacity for making industrial alcohol during World War II.

According to E. Kyle Romero, after World War II, whiskey transitioned from a primarily domestic product to a major export product. The war introduced many American soldiers to whiskey, and veterans boosted a growing domestic demand. The postwar economic boom and the rise of consumer culture fueled whiskey's golden age in the 1950s and 1960s, solidifying its place in global markets. The Bourbon Institute, established in 1958, played a crucial role in reducing trade restrictions, particularly in Europe, further expanding whiskey's international reach. By 1960, the institute explicitly framed bourbon as a cultural ambassador of American identity, reinforcing the idea that its global presence reflected the broader influence of American ways and products.

In 1964, when Americans consumed around 77 million gallons of bourbon, a concurrent resolution adopted by the United States Congress in 1964 declared bourbon to be a "distinctive product of the United States" and asked "the appropriate agencies of the United States Government ... [to] take appropriate action to prohibit importation into the United States of whiskey designated as 'Bourbon Whiskey'". A U.S. federal regulation now restricts the definition of bourbon for whiskey to only include spirits produced in the U.S.

In recent years, bourbon and Tennessee whiskey, which is sometimes regarded as a different type of spirit but generally meets the legal requirements to be called bourbon, have enjoyed significant growth in popularity. The industry trade group Distilled Spirits Council of the United States (DISCUS) tracks sales of bourbon and Tennessee whiskey together.

According to DISCUS, during 2009–2014, the number of 9-liter cases of whiskey sold increased by 28.5% overall. Higher-end bourbon and whiskeys experienced the greatest growth. Gross supplier revenues (including federal excise tax) for U.S. bourbon and Tennessee whiskey increased by 46.7% over the 2009–2014 period, with the greatest growth coming from high-end products. In 2014, more than 19 million nine-liter cases of bourbon and Tennessee whiskey were sold in the U.S., generating almost $2.7 billion in wholesale distillery revenue. U.S. exports of bourbon whiskey surpassed $1 billion for the first time in 2013; distillers hailed the rise of a "golden age of Kentucky bourbon" and predicted further growth. In 2014, it was estimated that U.S. bourbon whiskey exports surpassed $1 billion, making up the majority of the U.S. total of $1.6 billion in spirits exports. Major export markets for U.S. spirits are, in descending order: Canada, the United Kingdom, Germany, Australia, and France. The largest percentage increases in U.S. exports were, in descending order: Brazil, the Dominican Republic, Bahamas, Israel, and United Arab Emirates. Key elements of growth in the markets showing the largest increases have been changes of law, trade agreements, and reductions of tariffs, as well as increased consumer demand for premium-category spirits.

During the second Trump administration, international sales of bourbon decreased significantly as importing countries curtailed their purchases. Provinces in Canada, which until the trade war and annexation threats had comprised 10% of Kentucky's whiskey business, stopped selling American products in government-owned liquor stores. This led to a contraction in the bourbon business, with multiple distilleries filing for bankruptcy. Overall exports of American spirits, bourbon included, fell 9% between 2024 and 2025.

By early 2026, despite the contraction in exports, the industry's total economic impact in Kentucky reached a record US$10.6 billion, according to the Kentucky Distillers' Association. This growth has been met with significant logistical hurdles, specifically in the management of a record 16.1 million aging barrels, necessitating a rapid expansion of bonded warehouse (rickhouse) infrastructure across the state. To mitigate inventory imbalances caused by global trade volatility, some major producers implemented production pauses in 2026, most notably at Jim Beam's Clermont facility.

== Legal requirements ==
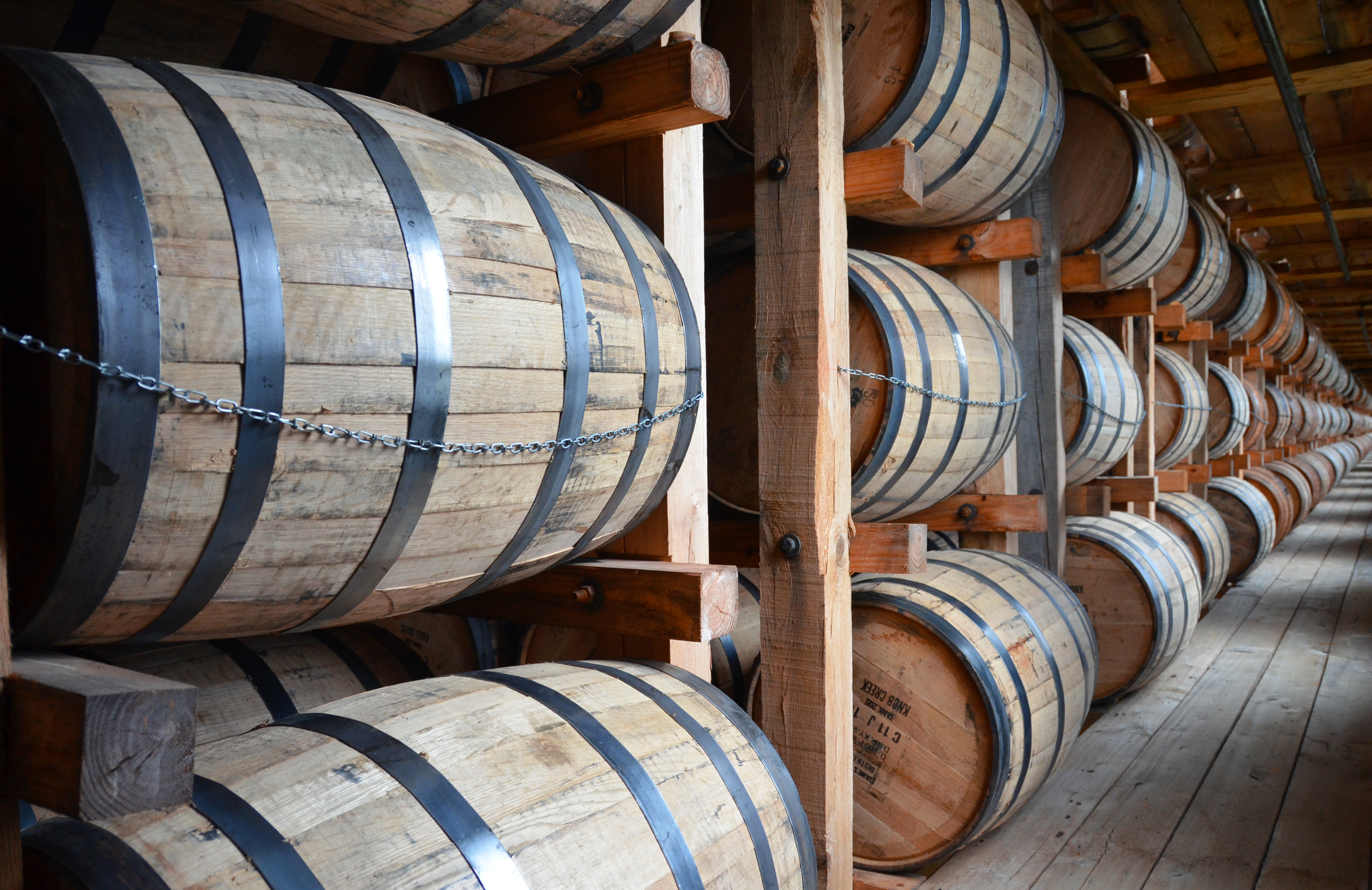
American white oak barrels filled with new bourbon whiskey rest in a rickhouse, giving bourbon its well-known copper color

Bourbon's legal definition varies somewhat from country to country, but many trade agreements require that the name "bourbon" be reserved for products made in the U.S. The U.S. regulations for labeling and advertising bourbon apply only to products made for consumption within the U.S.; they do not apply to distilled spirits made for export. Canadian law requires products labeled bourbon to be made in the U.S. and to conform to the requirements that apply within the U.S. The European Union also requires bourbon to be made in the U.S. following the law of the country. However, in other countries, products labeled bourbon may not adhere to the same standards. For example, U.S.-produced products with somewhat lower alcohol content than the level required in the United States can be sold in Australia as bourbon, with Cougar Bourbon being an example of an export-only brand produced in the U.S. for the Australia market.

The Federal Standards of Identity for Distilled Spirits, codified under 27 CFR §5 Subpart I states that bourbon made for U.S. consumption must be:

- Produced in the U.S. (which includes the 50 states, the District of Columbia and Puerto Rico)
- Made from a grain mixture that is at least 51% corn
- Aged in new, charred oak containers
- Distilled to no more than 160 (U.S.) proof (80% alcohol by volume)
- Entered into the container for aging at no more than 125 proof (62.5% alcohol by volume)
- Bottled (like other whiskeys) at 80 proof or more (40% alcohol by volume)

Bourbon has no minimum specified duration for its aging period. Products aged for as little as three months are sold as bourbon. The exception is straight bourbon, which has a minimum aging requirement of two years. In addition, any bourbon aged less than four years must include an age statement on its label.

Bourbon that meets the above requirements, has been aged for a minimum of two years, and does not have added coloring, flavoring, or other spirits may be – but is not required to be – called straight bourbon.

- Bourbon that has been aged less than four years must be labeled with the duration of its aging.
- Bourbon that has an age stated on its label must be labeled with the age of the youngest whiskey in the bottle (not counting the age of any added neutral grain spirits in a bourbon that is labeled as blended, as neutral-grain spirits are not considered whiskey under the regulations and are not required to be aged at all).

Bottled in bond bourbon is a sub-category of straight bourbon that must be produced by a single distiller at a single distillery in a single season, aged at least four years in a bonded warehouse under federal control, and bottled at 100 proof (50% ABV).

Bourbon that is labeled blended (or as a blend) may contain added coloring, flavoring, and other spirits, such as un-aged neutral grain spirits, but at least 51% of the product must be straight bourbon.

"High rye bourbon" is not a legally defined term but usually means a bourbon with 20–35% rye in its mash bill. High-wheat or "wheated" bourbons are described as more mild and subdued compared to high-rye varieties.

Bourbon that has been aged for less than three years cannot legally be referred to as whiskey (or whisky) in the European Union.

=== Geographic origin ===
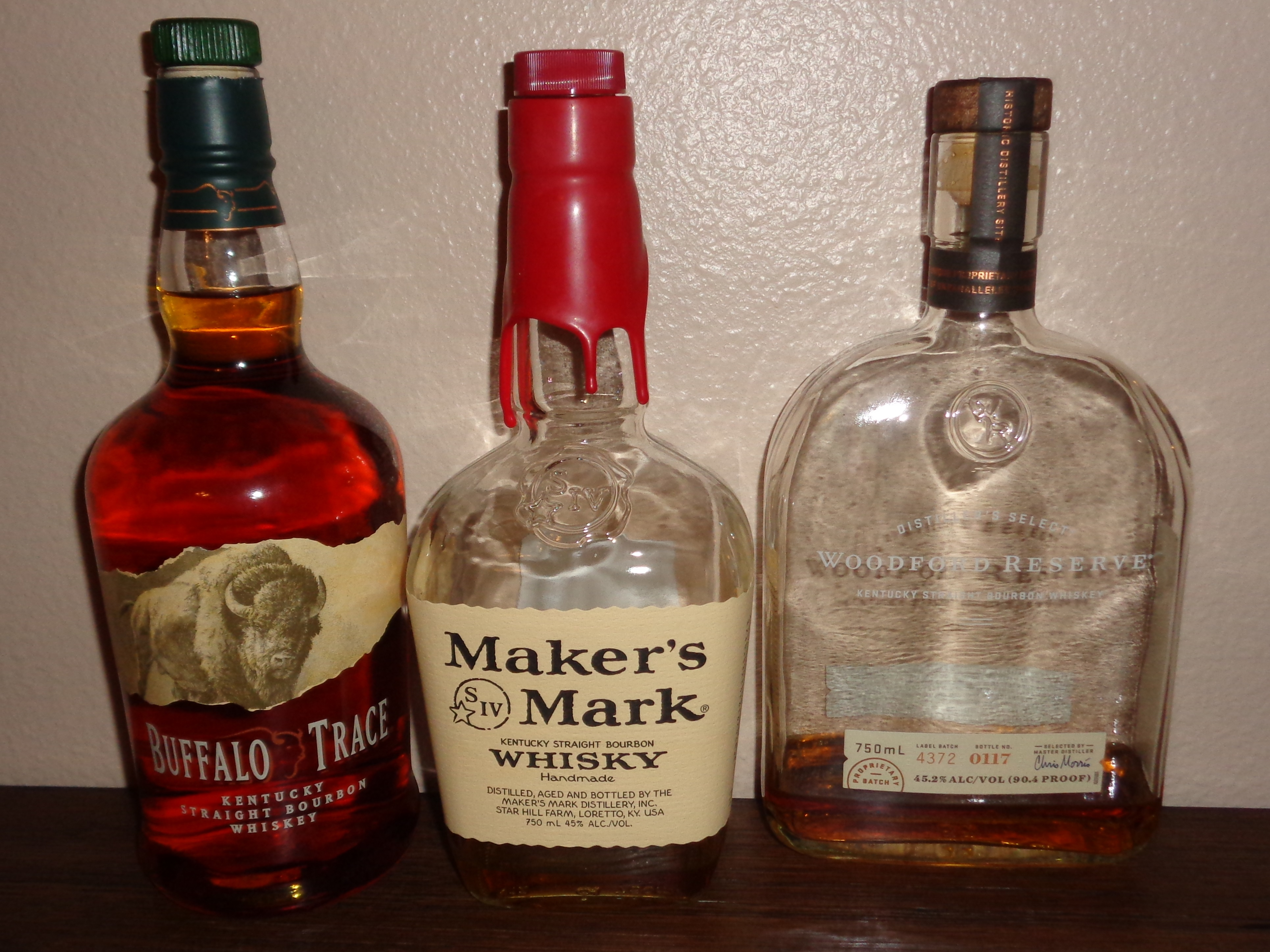
The bourbon distilleries that produce Buffalo Trace (left), Maker's Mark (center), and Woodford Reserve (right), are National Historic Landmarks in Kentucky.

On May 4, 1964, the U.S. Congress declared bourbon whiskey as a "distinctive product of the United States" by concurrent resolution. Bourbon may be produced anywhere in the U.S. where it is legal to distill spirits, but most brands are produced in Kentucky, where bourbon production has a strong historical association. The filtering of iron-free water through the high concentrations of limestone that are unique to the area is often touted by bourbon distillers in Kentucky as a signature step in the bourbon-making process.

On August 2, 2007, the U.S. Senate passed a resolution sponsored by Senator Jim Bunning (R-KY) officially declaring September 2007 to be National Bourbon Heritage Month, commemorating the history of bourbon whiskey. Notably, the resolution claimed that Congress had declared bourbon to be "America's Native Spirit" in its 1964 resolution. However, the 1964 resolution did not contain such a statement; it declared bourbon to be a distinctive product identifiable with the U.S. (in a similar way that Scotch is considered identifiable with Scotland). The resolution was passed again in 2008.

As of 2018, 95% of all bourbon is produced in Kentucky, according to the Kentucky Distillers' Association. As of 2018, there were 68 whiskey distilleries in Kentucky, this was up 250 percent in the past ten years. At that time, the state had more than 8.1 million barrels of bourbon that were aging. By October 2025, the inventory reached an all-time high of 16.1 million aging barrels, according to the Kentucky Distillers' Association.

Bardstown, Kentucky, is home to the annual Bourbon Festival held each September. It has been called the "Bourbon Capital of the World" by the Bardstown Tourism Commission and the Kentucky Bourbon Festival organizers who have registered the phrase as a trademark. The Kentucky Bourbon Trail is the name of a tourism promotion program organized by the Kentucky Distillers' Association that is aimed at attracting visitors to the distilleries in Kentucky, particularly Four Roses (Lawrenceburg), Heaven Hill (Bardstown), Jim Beam (Clermont), Maker's Mark (Loretto), Town Branch (Lexington), Wild Turkey (Lawrenceburg), and Woodford Reserve (Versailles).

Tennessee is home to other major bourbon makers, although most prefer to call their product "Tennessee whiskey" instead, including giant Jack Daniel's. It is legally defined under Tennessee House Bill 1084, the North American Free Trade Agreement and at least one other international trade agreement as the recognized name for a straight bourbon whiskey produced in Tennessee. It is also required to meet the legal definition of bourbon under Canadian law.

Although some Tennessee whiskey makers maintain that a pre-aging filtration through chunks of maple charcoal, known as the Lincoln County Process and legally mandated since 2013, (Note: Prior to 2013, the use of the Lincoln County Process was not actually required for making products identified as Tennessee whiskey. However, on May 13, 2013, the Governor Bill Haslam of Tennessee signed House Bill 1084, requiring the Lincoln County process and the existing requirements for bourbon to be used for products identified as "Tennessee whiskey". As a grandfathering measure, the law exempted one small producer, Benjamin Prichard's. As U.S. federal law requires statements of origin on labels to be accurate, and various international trade agreements also codify this requirement, the Tennessee law effectively gives a firm definition to Tennessee whiskey.) make its flavor distinct from bourbon, U.S. regulations defining bourbon neither require nor prohibit its use.

Bourbon also was and is made in other U.S. states. The largest bourbon distiller outside of Kentucky and Tennessee is MGP of Indiana, which primarily wholesales its spirits products to bottling companies that sell them under about 50 different brand names – in some cases, misleadingly marketed as "craft" whiskey, despite being produced at a large wholesaler's factory.

== Production process ==
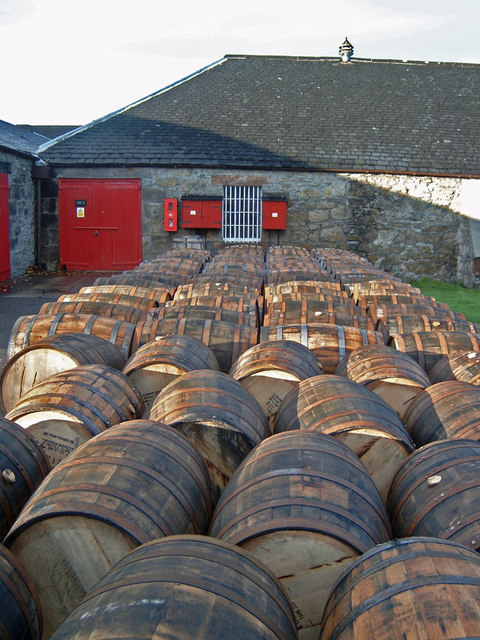
Used bourbon barrels awaiting fresh contents in Scotland

To be legally sold as bourbon, the whiskey's mash bill requires a minimum of 51% corn, with the remainder being any cereal grain. A proposed change to U.S. regulations will expand allowable "grains" to include seeds of the pseudocereals amaranth, buckwheat, and quinoa. A mash bill that contains wheat instead of rye produces what is known as a wheated bourbon.

The grain is ground and mixed with water. Usually mash from a previous distillation is added to ensure consistency across batches, creating a sour mash. Finally, yeast is added, and the mash is fermented. It is distilled to (typically) between 65% and 80% alcohol using either a traditional alembic (or pot still) or the much less expensive continuous still. Most modern bourbons are initially run off using a column still and then redistilled in a "doubler" (alternatively known as a "thumper" or "retort") that is basically a pot still.

The resulting clear spirit, called "white dog", is placed in charred new oak containers for aging. In practice, these containers are generally barrels made from American white oak. The spirit gains its color and much of its flavor from the caramelized sugars and vanillins in the charred wood. Straight bourbon must be aged at least two years, and blended bourbon must contain at least 51% straight bourbon on a proof gallon basis (i.e., most of the alcohol in the blend must be from straight bourbon). Bourbons gain more color and flavor the longer they age in wood. Changes to the spirit also occur due to evaporation and chemical processes such as oxidation. Lower-priced bourbons tend to be aged relatively briefly. Even for higher-priced bourbons, "maturity" rather than a particular age duration is often the goal, as over-aging bourbons can negatively affect the flavor of the bourbon (making it taste woody, bitter, or unbalanced).

The remainder of the spirits in a blended bourbon may be neutral grain spirits that are not aged at all. If a product is labeled merely as bourbon whiskey rather than straight or blended, no specific minimum aging period is prescribed – only that the product has been "stored at not more than 62.5% alcohol by volume (125 proof) in charred new oak containers".

After maturing, bourbon is withdrawn from the barrel and is typically filtered and diluted with water. It is then bottled at no less than 80 US proof (40% abv). Although most bourbon whiskey is sold at 80 proof, bourbon can be bottled much higher. All "bottled in bond" bourbon is 100 proof. Some higher-proof bottlings are marketed as "barrel proof" or "cask strength", meaning they have not been diluted or have been only slightly diluted (less than 1% ABV dilution) after removal from the barrels. Bourbon whiskey may be sold at less than 80 proof but must be labeled as "diluted bourbon".

A very small number of bourbon bottlings have been released with exceptionally high proof, sometimes exceeding 140 proof (70% ABV). In the mid-2010s, some sources began referring to these as "hazmat" bourbons, alluding to the ban in the U.S. Code of Federal Regulations on air travel passengers and crew members carrying such high-proof beverages due to their highly flammable nature. Such high proof levels are very uncommon even among "barrel proof" bourbons, as bourbon must enter the barrel at no higher than 125 proof and thus can only reach higher concentrations by disproportionate evaporation of water in the Angel's share during aging. Although only the focus of special attention for bourbon since the mid-2010s, very-high-proof products are not especially novel in general, as evidenced by the well-known Bacardi 151 brand of rum, which was available on the U.S. and Canadian markets from about 1963 until 2016 and was bottled at 75.5% ABV.

After processing, barrels remain saturated with up to 10 U.S. gallons (38 liters) of bourbon, although 2–3 U.S. gallons (8–11 liters) is the norm. They may not be reused for bourbon, and most are sold to distilleries in Canada, Scotland, Ireland, Mexico, and the Caribbean for aging other spirits. Some are employed in the manufacture of various barrel-aged products, including amateur and professionally brewed bourbon barrel-aged beer, barbecue sauce, wine, hot sauce, and others. Since 2011, Jim Beam has employed barrel rinsing on a large scale to extract bourbon from its used barrels, mixing the extract with a 6-year-old Beam bourbon to create a 90-proof product that it sells as "Devil's Cut".

The bottling operation for bourbon is the process of filtering, mixing together straight whiskey from different barrels (sometimes from different distilleries), diluting with water, blending with other ingredients (if producing blended bourbon), and filling containers to produce the final product that is marketed to consumers. By itself, the phrase "bottled by" means only that. Only if the bottler operates the distillery that produced the whiskey may "distilled by" be added to the label.

Labeling requirements for bourbon and other alcoholic beverages (including the requirements for what is allowed to be called bourbon under U.S. law) are defined in the U.S. Code of Federal Regulations. No whiskey made outside the U.S. may be labeled bourbon or sold as bourbon inside the U.S. Various other countries have trade agreements with the U.S. to recognize bourbon as a distinctive product of the U.S., including Canada and Mexico, the United Kingdom, Chile, and Brazil.

A 2016 experiment by Louisville craft distiller Jefferson's Bourbon suggests that in the era before whiskey was routinely bottled at the distillery, Kentucky bourbon developed a superior taste because it was shipped in barrels, using water transport wherever practical. To test this theory, Jefferson's cofounder Trey Zoeller sent two barrels of the company's signature product to New York City via barge, first down the Ohio and Mississippi Rivers and then along the Intracoastal Waterway. As a control, he brought a batch of the same whiskey that had remained in Louisville during the same period. According to Popular Mechanics writer Jacqueline Detwiler-George, who documented the test, the sample that made the waterborne journey "was mature beyond its age, richer, with new flavors of tobacco, vanilla, caramel, and honey. It was some of the best bourbon any of us had ever drunk." It was theorized that the action of gentle sloshing of the whiskey in barrels for a period of 2 to 4 weeks during the barge trip led to a dramatic improvement in smoothness and taste. Chemical analysis of the two samples revealed significant differences in molecular profiles, with the sample transported by water having a greater diversity of aromatic compounds.

== Uses ==
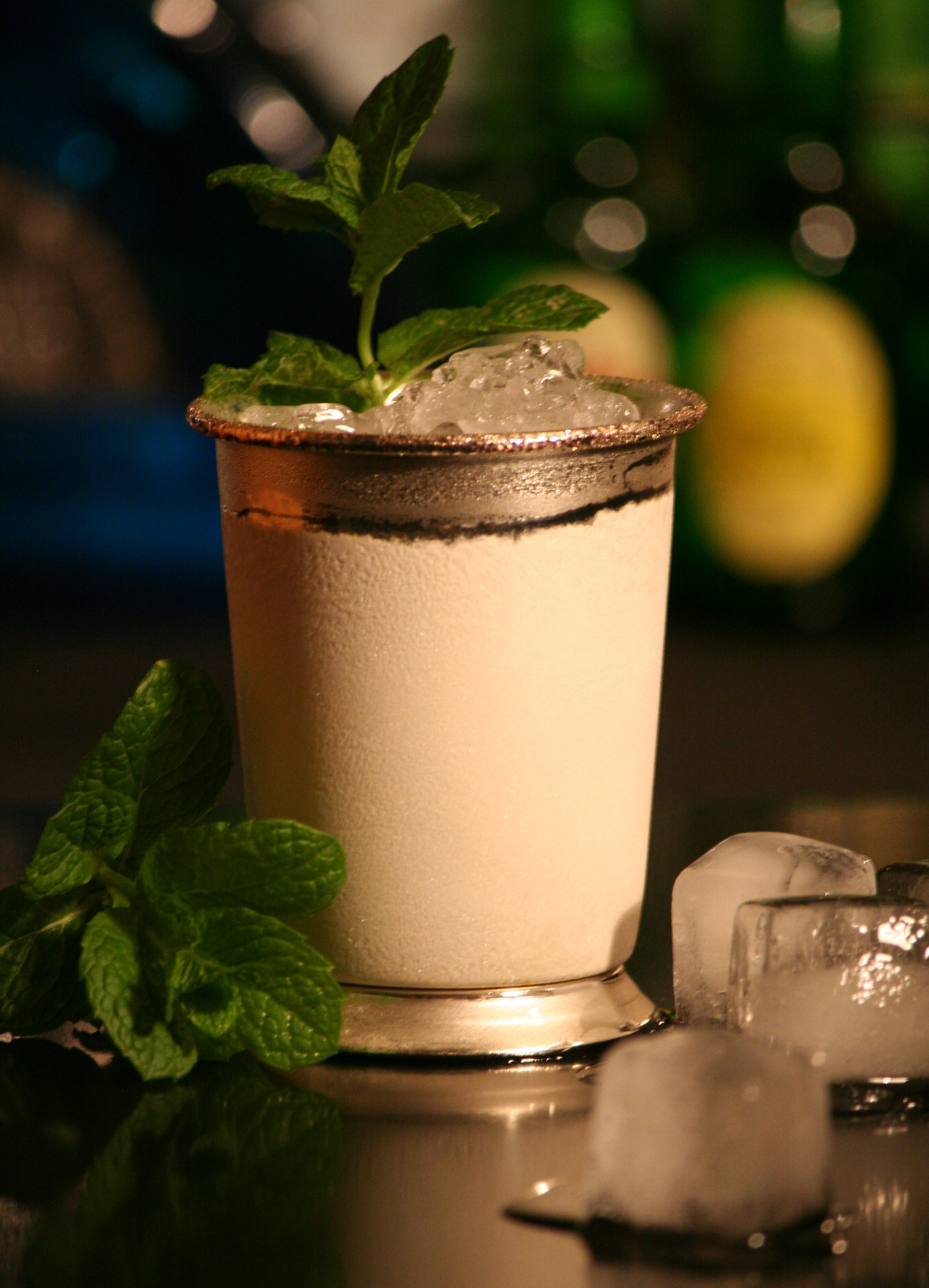
A mint julep

Bourbon is served in a variety of ways, including neat; diluted with water; over ice ("on the rocks"); with cola or other beverages in simple mixed drinks; and in cocktails – including the Manhattan, the Old Fashioned, the whiskey sour, and the mint julep. Bourbon is also used in cooking, and it was historically used for medicinal purposes.

Bourbon can be used in a variety of confections such as a banana bourbon syrup for waffles, a flavoring for chocolate cake, and fruit-based desserts like grilled peach sundaes served with salted bourbon-caramel, or brown sugar shortcake with warmed bourbon peaches. It is an optional ingredient in several pie recipes traditional to American cuisine, including pumpkin pie, where it can be combined with brown sugar and pecans to make a sweet and crunchy topping for the creamy pumpkin pie filling. It can also be used as a flavoring in sauces for savory dishes like grit cakes with country ham served with bourbon mayonnaise, Kentucky bourbon chili, and grilled flank steak.

== See also ==
- American Whiskey Trail
- Bourbon Trail
- Distilled Spirits Council of the United States
- Kentucky Bourbon Trail
- List of cocktails with bourbon
- List of maize dishes
- Moonshine
- Rye whiskey
- Single barrel whiskey
- Small batch
