= Raising Hell (Weir and Noyes book) =

1983 book by David Weir and Dan Noyes

- Author: David Weir and Dan Noyes, foreword by Mike Wallace
- Cover artist: Mike Fender
- Language: English
- Genre: Nonfiction, journalism
- Publisher: Addison-Wesley
- Publication date: September 1983
- Publication place: United States
- Media type: Print, Hardcover
- Pages: 340 p.
- ISBN: 0-201-10858-5
- OCLC: 9622391

Raising Hell: How the Center for Investigative Reporting Gets the Story is a nonfiction book by journalists David Weir and Dan Noyes, the co-founders of the Center for Investigative Reporting in San Francisco, with a foreword by Mike Wallace of CBS News. It was published in 1983 by Addison-Wesley Publishing Company and contains reprints of investigative journalism articles from the time period, with analysis and background on how the journalists investigated the issues and prepared the articles. An article by Kate Coleman and Paul Avery called "The Party's Over", which discussed the Black Panthers, was analyzed.

Jessica Mitford and Mike Wallace both wrote positively of the book. It was also reviewed in Newspaper Research Journal.

Raising Hell is used as a college textbook, and is referenced in Pearson's The Shadow of the Panther, and in John Lofland's Social Movement Organizations: Guide to Research on Insurgent Realities.
