= Raising the Wind =

Raising the Wind may refer to:

- Raising the Wind, an 1803 farce by James Kenney in which the character Jeremy Diddler appears
- Raising the Wind (1925 film), a British short comedy film directed by Leslie S. Hiscott
- Raising the Wind (1961 film), a British comedy film directed by Gerald Thomas
- Raising the Wind (1934 film), an alternate name for the American film The Big Race directed by Fred C. Newmeyer
