= FIRST Frenzy: Raising the Bar =

2004 FIRST Robotics Competition game

- Year: 2004

Season Information
- Number of teams: 927
- Number of regionals: 26
- Championship location: Georgia Dome, Atlanta, Georgia

FIRST Championship Awards
- Chairman's Award winner: Team 254 - "The Cheesy Poofs"
- Woodie Flowers Award winner: David Kelso - Team 131
- Champions: Team 71 - "Team Hammond"; Team 435 - "Robodogs"; Team 494 - "Goodrich Martians"

FIRST Frenzy: Raising the Bar was the 2004 game for the FIRST Robotics Competition. The game included elements from previous years' games, including mobile goals, "capping" goals with large inflatable balls, and others. In Raising the Bar, teams could score by having their human player score purple balls in any of the goals, capping the goals with a multiplier ball, or hanging their robot suspended from the 10-foot (3.0 m) high 'chin up bar'. In the qualifying matches, Teams competed in 2-member randomly generated alliances. In the elimination rounds, 3-member alliances competed against each other with one team sitting out each match. The alliance that won two matches advanced in the tournament.

== Scoring ==
Teams were given 5 points for every small purple ball contained within any of the goals. The 4 small yellow balls that started on the posts were each worth 10 points when contained in any goal. Teams could double the score of any given goal by placing a large yellow ball on top of it. Finally, teams could end the match hanging from the chin-up bar for a 50 point bonus at the end of the match.

== Field ==
The field was dominated by the large area surrounding the chin up bar. The raised area included two non-mobile goals at each end, and another 6 in (152 mm) raised area directly below the chin up bar. At the beginning of the match, two mobile goals were placed at each end of the field with the multiplier balls sitting on top of them. Above each player station were racks holding 18 purple balls. These racks would release during the game, showering the field with balls.

== Gameplay ==
=== Autonomous mode ===
Autonomous mode involved knocking a small yellow ball off a pole just outside the game area. If accomplished, the team would win a small bonus and all the balls above that team's station would be released. Winning autonomous was advantageous for teams as it released balls on their side 40 seconds earlier than the balls would be released otherwise. This allowed that side to immediately begin collecting and scoring balls.

Some teams opted not to interact with the yellow balls, instead choosing to focus on the other field elements. Some teams attempted to reposition the mobile goals for scoring, and other teams decided to pursue hanging on the bar during the autonomous period.

=== Teleoperated period ===
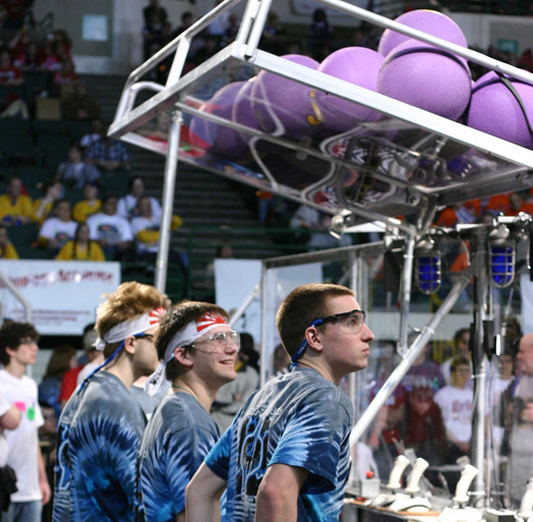
Alliance station

The game proceeded as both teams attempted to score as many points as possible. Teams needed to push balls into the ball chutes in the corner in order to deliver them to their human players. Once the human player received the balls, they would throw them, basketball style, into the mobile or stationary goals for 5 points each. As the end of the game neared, teams would begin capping the goals with the multiplier balls, then attempt to hang off the bar.

== Designs ==
Many teams opted to build one articulated arm that performed all game tasks. A single arm would cap goals and hang off the bar. Because the bonus for hanging off the bar was so substantial, some teams would design their robot entirely around quickly hanging off the bar. Further, some teams would incorporate denial systems so that once their robot hung off the bar, they would block or even actively push off other robots that were already there. A final design was a robot that collected balls off the floor and dumped them in the corner ball chutes. Grappling hooks were used by some teams.

== Events ==
The following regional events were held in 2004:

- Arizona Regional - Phoenix
- BAE Systems Granite State Regional - Manchester, NH
- Buckeye Regional - Cleveland, OH
- Chesapeake Regional - Annapolis, MD
- Colorado Regional - Denver
- Detroit Regional - Detroit
- Florida Regional - Orlando
- Great Lakes Regional - Ypsilanti, MI
- Greater Toronto Regional - Mississauga, ON (2 fields)
- Lone Star Regional - Houston
- Midwest Regional - Evanston, Il
- NASA/VCU Regional - Richmond, VA
- New Jersey Regional - Trenton, NJ
- New York City Regional - New York City
- Pacific Northwest Regional - Portland
- Palmetto Regional - Columbia, SC
- Peachtree Regional - Duluth, GA
- Philadelphia Regional - Philadelphia
- Pittsburgh Regional - Pittsburgh
- St. Louis Regional - St. Charles, MO
- Sacramento Regional - Sacramento, CA
- SBPLI Long Island Regional - Brentwood, NY
- Silicon Valley Regional - San Jose, CA
- Southern California Regional - Los Angeles
- UTC New England Regional - Hartford, CT
- West Michigan Regional - Allendale, MI

The championship was held in the Georgia Dome, Atlanta.
