= George Dickel =

Brand of whisky produced in the State of Tennessee

George A. Dickel & Co.
- Type: Tennessee whisky
- Manufacturer: Diageo
- Origin: United States
- Introduced: 1964
- Alcohol by volume: 40% 43% 45% 50%
- Proof (US): 80; 86; 90; 100
- Website: www.georgedickel.com

- Cascade Distillery Site
- U.S. National Register of Historic Places
- Location: West side of Cascade Hollow Road, about .7 miles (1.1 km) NW of the junction with Riley Creek Road
- Nearest city: Normandy, Tennessee
- Coordinates: 35°26′19″N 86°14′41″W
- Built: 1877
- NRHP reference No.: 94000578
- Added to NRHP: June 10, 1994

George Dickel is a brand of Tennessee whisky produced in Tullahoma, in Coffee County, Tennessee. Today owned by Diageo, the modern brand was introduced in 1964, though the distillery has a longer history. Whisky production and aging takes place at the Cascade Hollow Distillery, which offers tours to the public and is part of the American Whiskey Trail. George Dickel operates the second-largest distillery in Tennessee, selling 130,000 cases in 2013, while the largest is Jack Daniel's, which sold 11.5 million cases the same year.

The brand's labels use the traditional Scottish spelling of whisky, instead of the more common American English spelling: whiskey. According to the company, this is because Dickel believed his product to be as smooth and high in quality as the best Scotch whiskies.

== History ==
George A. Dickel was born in Germany in 1818, and emigrated to the United States in 1844. He founded a retail business in Nashville, Tennessee, in the 1850s, and began selling liquor in 1861. After the Civil War, he operated a liquor store on South College Street in Nashville. In the late 1860s, he founded George A. Dickel and Company, a wholesaling firm which bought whiskey from regional distillers and distributed it in barrels, jugs and bottles. In 1871, Meier Saltzkotter, who had worked as a superintendent for Dickel, became a partner in the company. Victor Emmanuel Shwab (1847–1924), a brother-in-law of Dickel who had initially worked for the company as a bookkeeper, became a partner in 1881.

George A. Dickel and Company was selling whiskey produced in Cascade Hollow, near Normandy, Tennessee, by John F. Brown and F.E. Cunningham in the 1870s. In 1879, Matthew Sims, a local businessman, bought Brown's share of the operation. In 1883, another local businessman, McLin Davis (1852–1898), joined the partnership. Davis became the operation's distiller, and is credited with the whisky's recipe. By the early 1890s, Cascade Whisky was one of the more popular brands in the region. The Cascade label included the phrase, "Mellow as Moonlight", which was rooted in Davis's method of cooling mash at night.

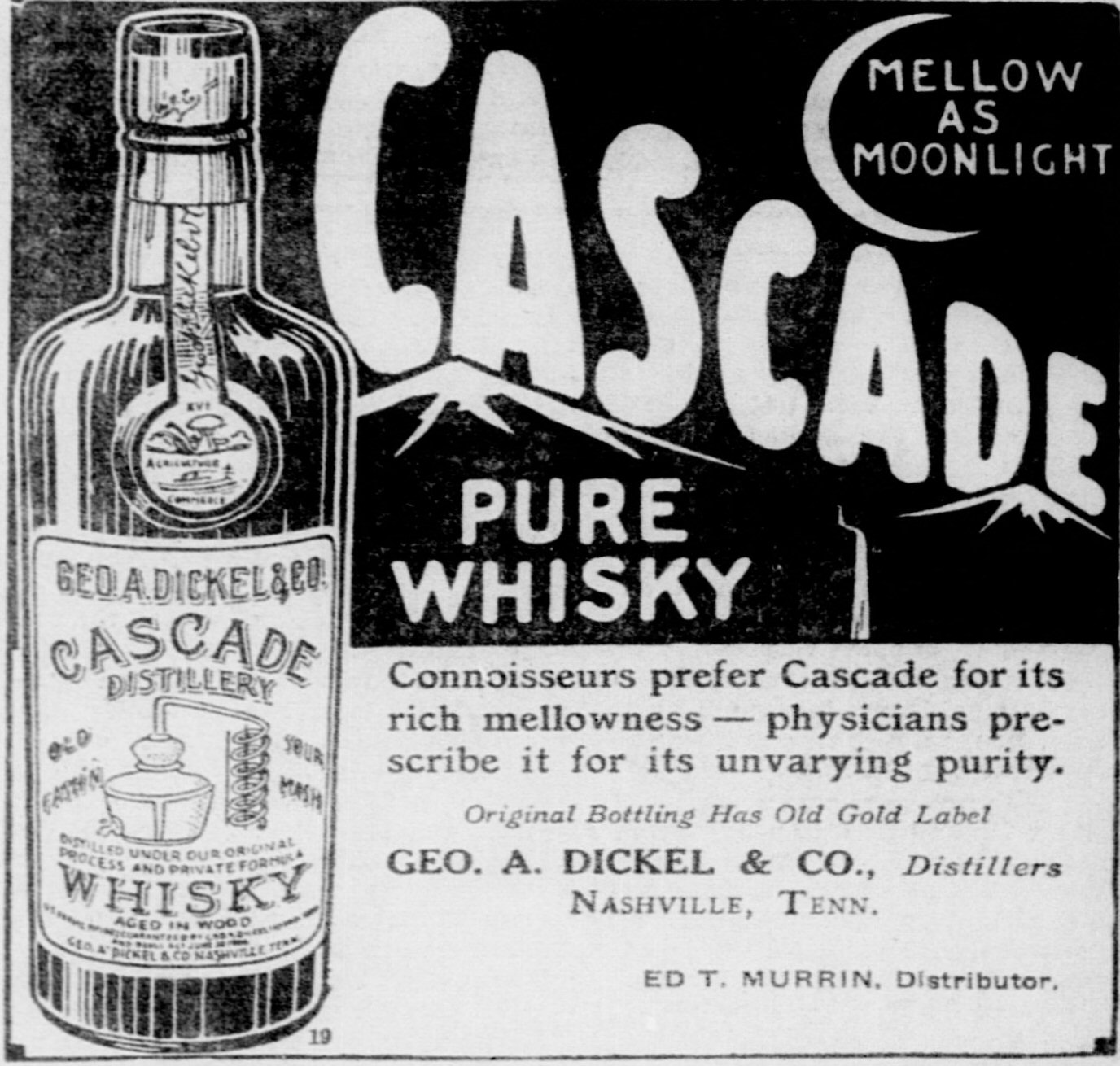
Cascade Pure Whisky ad from 1915

Following an accident in 1886, Dickel's health declined, and Shwab gradually took control of the wholesaling firm's daily operations. In 1888, Shwab purchased Sims's share of the Cascade Distillery, whose whiskey Dickel and Company had been selling for years. The terms of the purchase made Dickel and Company the sole distributor of Cascade. Shwab also purchased the popular Climax Saloon in Nashville, and afterward advertised the saloon as the "headquarters" of Cascade Whisky. After Davis's death in 1898, his son, Norman Davis, briefly ran the distillery, but was sued by Shwab and forced to sell his share in the operation.

Following Dickel's death in 1894, his share of Dickel and Company was willed to his wife, Augusta. Though he had advised her to sell out, she retained her share of the company, but did not participate in its operations. Upon her death in 1916, she willed her share to Shwab.

Throughout the early 1900s, Shwab fought vehemently against the rising calls for prohibition, spending thousands of dollars on lobbying campaigns in Nashville, and thwarting legislation aimed at curtailing the sale of alcohol on at least one occasion. In spite of his efforts, Tennessee enacted prohibition in 1910, forcing the Cascade operation to relocate to the Stitzel Distillery in Louisville, Kentucky. It was produced here until Kentucky enacted statewide prohibition in 1917. The operation shut down altogether with the onset of nationwide prohibition in 1920.

In 1933, national prohibition was repealed. Four years later, Shwab's heirs sold the Cascade brand to the Schenley Distilling Company. The recipe had never been written down, and had to be obtained from two former distillers at the Cascade Hollow site. In the 1940s and 1950s, Schenley's product, produced at the OFC Distillery in Frankfort, Kentucky, was marketed as Geo. A. Dickel's Cascade Kentucky Straight Bourbon Whisky.

In 1956, Schenley attempted to buy the Jack Daniel's brand. After its offer was refused, Schenley decided instead to return one of their own brands to its roots and compete against Jack Daniel's. In 1958, after the passage of enabling legislation making it legal to produce liquor in Coffee County, Tennessee, Schenley's Ralph Dupps reconstructed the Cascade Hollow distillery. The new distillery is located about a mile from the old distillery site, but still utilizes the waters of Cascade Branch and the Lincoln County Process for mellowing. The first mash was produced at the new distillery on July 4, 1959, and George Dickel Tennessee Whisky was first bottled in 1964. Schenley opted to use George Dickel's name as the trademark because of Cascade's reputation as a value brand. Various mergers and buyouts have resulted in Diageo owning the Dickel brand.

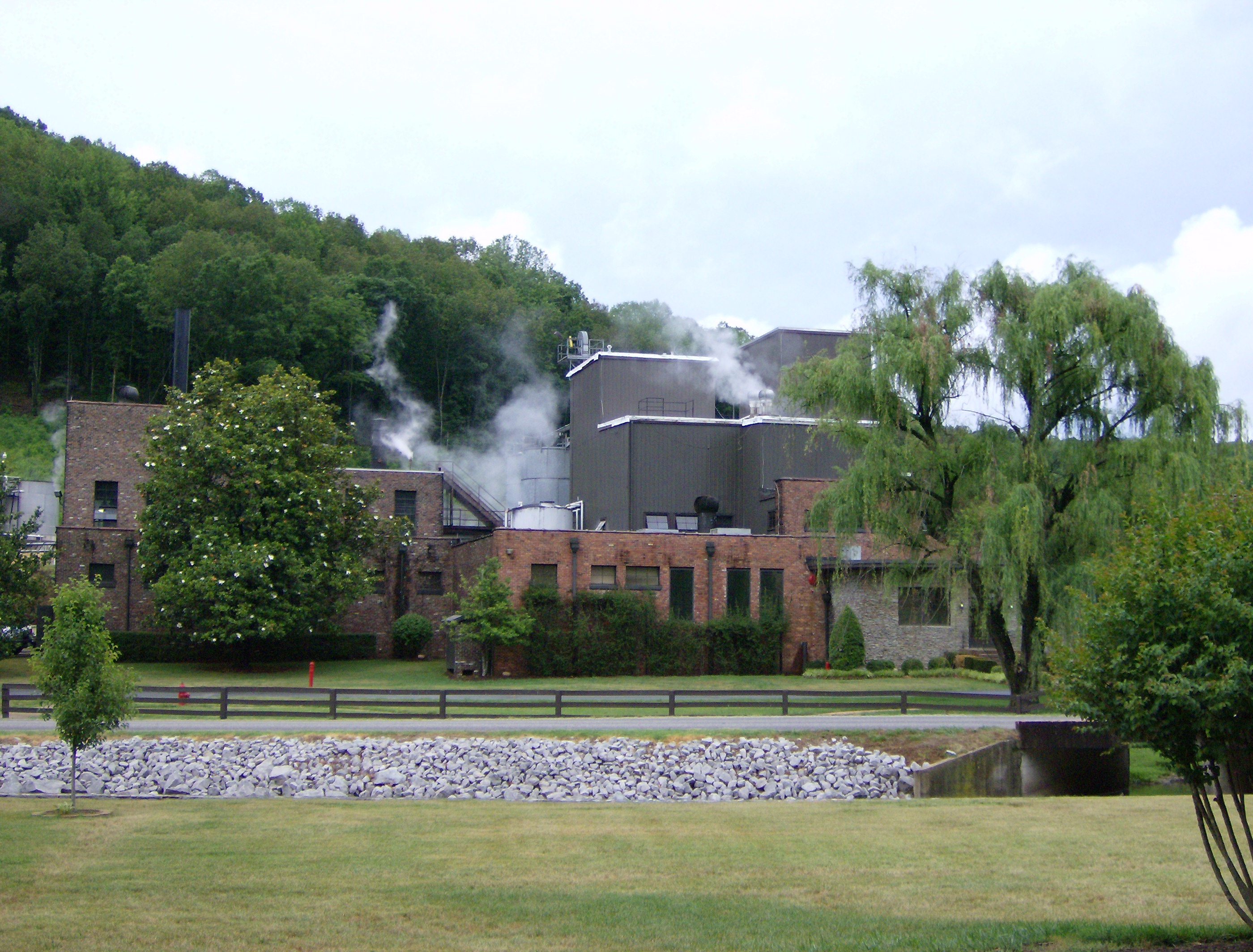
The Cascade Hollow distillery was reopened in 1958, and the present building dates from this era.

Increased production of George Dickel in the 1990s caused supply to exceed demand. In response, the distillery closed to allow the whisky's value to rebound and mitigate some wastewater issues at the distillery. The original site of the distillery at the south end of Cascade Hollow was listed on the National Register of Historic Places in 1994. The distillery reopened in 2003, almost too late to prevent a shortage of Old No. 8 in the market by 2007. Diageo introduced a younger, three-year-old version branded Old-Fashioned Cascade Hollow Batch Recipe to meet demand. It was discontinued in 2013, after aged stocks rebounded sufficiently.

George Dickel Rye, introduced in 2012, is the only Dickel product not produced at the Cascade Hollow Distillery. It is produced under contract by MGP Ingredients in Lawrenceburg, Indiana, and is mashed, distilled and aged there before being trucked to the Diageo facility in Plainfield, Illinois, for charcoal filtering and bottling.

In early 2014, Diageo introduced a Dickel No. 1 Foundation Recipe, using an unaged version of its standard mashbill of more than 80% corn, allowing for its sale as "corn whisky". Also around 2014, a new bottling line was installed at the distillery.

From 2005 to 2015, Cascade Distillery operated under the supervision of Master Distiller John Lunn. In March 2015, the company announced Lunn was leaving to become the master distiller for Popcorn Sutton microdistillery. Nicole Austin took over as general manager and distiller of Cascade Hollow Distilling Co. in March 2018. Prior to joining the Dickel team, she spent two years in Ireland serving as Tullamore D.E.W.'s commissioning engineer at its grain distillery in Offaly. Austin began her distilling career in 2010 as a master blender for Kings County Distillery.

== Production process ==
The mash for George Dickel is composed of 84% corn, 8% rye, and 8% malted barley. Distillate is chilled to 40 °F (4 °C) and mellowed in vats filled with 10–12 feet (3.0–3.7 m) of charcoal for several days (their implementation of the Lincoln County process) before being placed in barrels at 55 percent.

The distillery's barrel warehouses are one story high, minimizing variation in barrel aging. Whisky is aged for at least five years before it is considered for bottling. As of 1995 all products are further chill filtered, and calcium imparted by the barrel aging is removed.

== Products ==
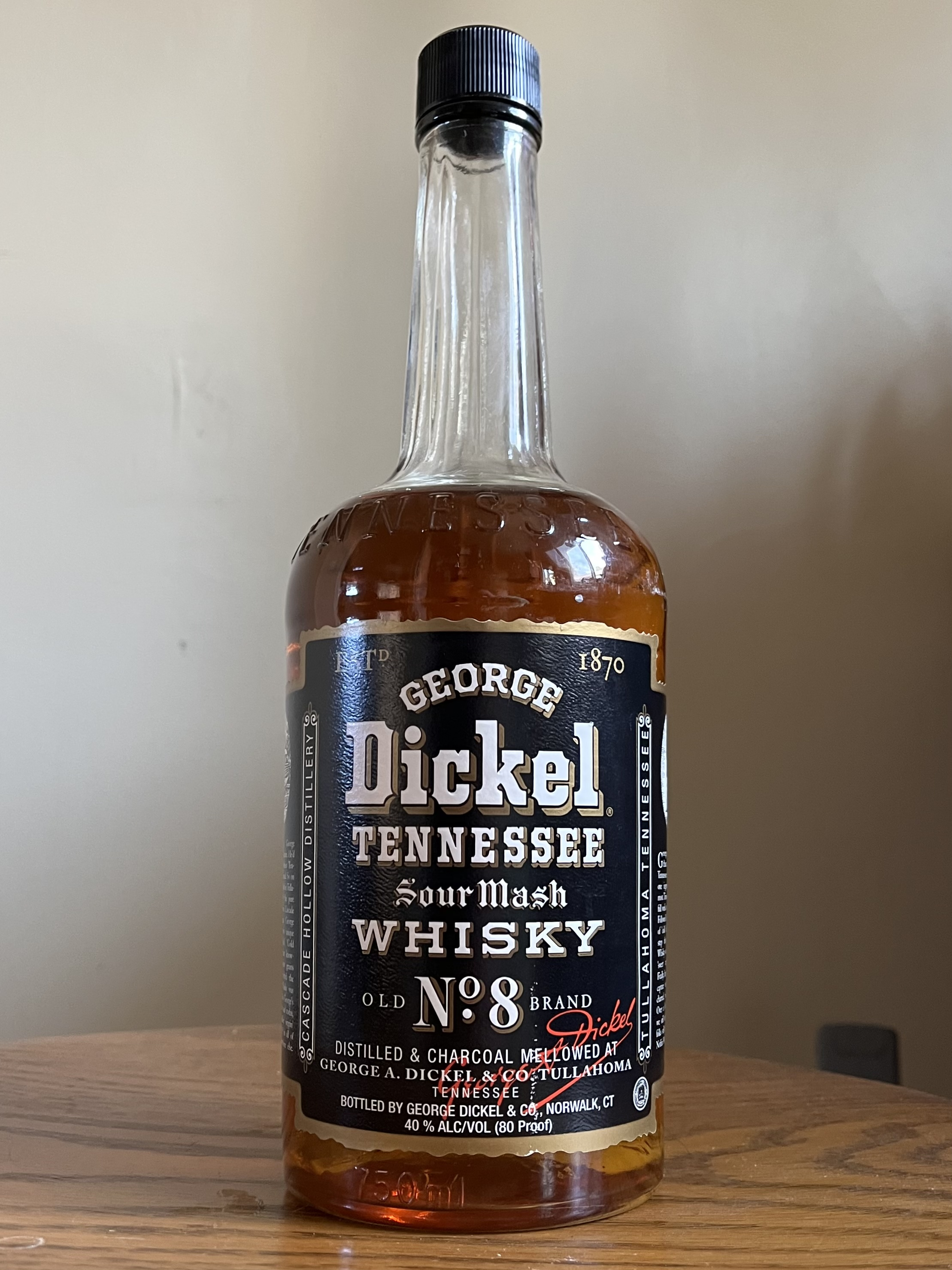
Old No.8

Several whiskies are produced under the George Dickel brand:

- Old No. 8 Brand with a black label, at 80 proof
- Superior No. 12 Brand with a beige label, at 90 proof

And others.

They also produce a very small selection of George Dickel Hand Selected Barrel aged at 9 years, solely produced for barrel purchasing members.

== Reviews and awards ==
Food critic Morgan Murphy said "Distilled twice, the white dog (No. 1 Foundation Recipe) at Dickel is chilled then filtered through wool blankets and maple sugar charcoal before it is put into the barrel and the result is smooth, sweet (but not overly so), and peppery."

In 2015, several George Dickel brands won awards at the 15th Annual San Francisco World Spirits Competition. George Dickel No. 12 was named "Best Tennessee Whiskey" and won a double gold medal. George Dickel Rye Whisky also won double gold, while George Dickel Barrel Select Tennessee Whisky earned a gold designation.
