= Benjamin Prichard's Tennessee Whiskey =

Brand of Tennessee whiskey

Prichard's Distillery
- Industry: Manufacturing and distillation of liquors
- Founded: Kelso, Tennessee (1997; 29 years ago)
- Founder: Phil Prichard
- Headquarters: Kelso, Tennessee, U.S.
- Products: Distilled and blended liquors
- Website: prichardsdistillery.com

Benjamin Prichard's Tennessee Whiskey is a brand of Tennessee whiskey produced in the small community of Kelso, Tennessee, in the United States. Although it is produced by one of only two distilleries operating in Lincoln County – and its unaged variation is named Lincoln County Lightning – Prichard's is not produced using the Lincoln County Process. Under a special grandfathering exemption under a Tennessee law enacted in 2013, the Prichard's distillery in Kelso is the only producer allowed to label its product as "Tennessee whiskey" without using this process. Prichard's whiskey is produced entirely using pot stills rather than column stills.

The Prichard's Distillery company opened the Kelso distillery in 1997 and opened a second location in Nashville, Tennessee, in 2014.

== History ==
The whiskey brand and distillery were founded by Phil Prichard, who is now the company's master distiller. He named it after his ancestor Benjamin Prichard, who operated a distillery in Davidson County, Tennessee, in the early 1800s, who bequeathed his distilling equipment to his son after his death in 1822.

The first Prichard's Distillery location was opened in an old schoolhouse in Kelso in 1997, making it the first new legal distillery to open in the state since the repeal of Prohibition. A second Prichard's distillery opened in May 2014 in Nashville, Tennessee, on the grounds of the Fontanel mansion in Whites Creek neighborhood. Both sites have distillery tours. The Fontanel site was owned by country music singer Barbara Mandrell from 1987 to 2002, and since 2010, it has been a tourist attraction, including a winery, zip lines, hiking, an amphitheater with live concerts, lodging, dining, shopping, and a tour of the Mandrell mansion, one of the largest log homes in the world. Prichard's Nashville location closed in 2021.

Prichard's rums come from American molasses sourced from Louisiana.

== Whiskeys ==
As of 2018, the Prichard's line of whiskeys includes:

- Prichard's Tennessee Whiskey (40% ABV/80 U.S. proof): This product is made from white corn instead of the yellow corn used for most Tennessee whiskeys. It doesn't use the Lincoln County Process that is normally required to qualify as Tennessee whiskey and is the only Tennessee whiskey that isn't required to meet this legal requirement.
- Prichard's Double Barreled Bourbon Whiskey (45% ABV/90 proof): This bourbon was given a score of 92 and described by whiskey-writer Jim Murray as "a classy effortless delivery…" in his 2009 Whisky Bible. It uses a re-barreling process that involves cutting down the proof level after 9 years of aging and then putting the spirit into new charred oak barrels again.
- Prichard's Double Chocolate Flavored Whiskey (45% ABV/90 proof): This flavored whiskey blends bourbon with artisan chocolate. It is the result of a collaboration between Prichard's and the Olive and Sinclair Chocolate Company.
- Prichard's Rye Whiskey (43% ABV/86 proof): This product was named one of the five best value rye whiskies by Gayot in 2014.
- Prichard's Tennessee Malt Whiskey (40% ABV/80 proof): This product is a malt (barley-based) whiskey.
- Prichard's Lincoln County Lightning Corn Whiskey (45% ABV/90 proof): This "moonshine" is made from white corn and bottled straight from the still. Southern Living said it has "an agave-like aroma" and "a salty, grassy taste."

== Other spirits ==
The current line of rums and liqueurs made at the Prichard's distilleries includes:

=== Rums ===
- Prichard's Fine Aged Rum (40% ABV/80 proof): This rum is made with molasses and aged at least three years in handmade, charred white oak casks.
- Prichard's Crystal Rum (40% ABV/80 proof): This blend is distilled five times.
- Prichard's Sweet Georgia Belle Peach Mango Rum (35% ABV/70 proof): Natural peach and mango infusions give this rum a summer fruit flavor for cocktails and iced tea.
- Prichard's Key Lime Rum (35% ABV/70 proof): Key limes add citrus flavor to this tropical rum.
- Prichard's Cranberry Rum (35% ABV/70 proof): This is a cranberry-infused rum, and the producer suggests serving it with limes.
- Prichard's Private Stock Aged Rum (45% ABV/90 proof): A limited offering that is ultra-aged for ten years in charred oak barrels to deepen the flavor, this rum is only available at the two Prichard's distilleries. Wine Enthusiast described it as "Weighty, rich and toffee-like, it's rum with gravitas."
- Prichard's Spiced Rum (40% ABV/80 proof): With tropical flavors, natural vanilla, and cinnamon, this spicy rum is smooth enough for sipping in addition to being used in frozen cocktails.

=== Liqueurs ===
- Prichard's Sweet Lucy Liqueur (35% ABV/70 proof): With a higher ABV than the cream version, the Sweet Lucy recipe comes from a homemade blend of whiskey, peaches, apricots, oranges and sugar that has a long history among hunters and other outdoorsmen.
- Prichard's Sweet Lucy Cream Liqueur (17.5% ABV/35 proof): This liqueur is made with a blend of Sweet Lucy and premium Wisconsin cream.
- Prichard's Sweet Lucifer Liqueur (35% ABV/70 proof): This is Sweet Lucy infused with spicy ginger to create a bourbon liqueur with some spicy heat.
- Prichard's Praline Cream Liqueur (17.5% ABV/35 proof): This sweet spirit is made to taste like the nutty caramel flavor of a praline.
- Prichard's Fudge Brownie Cream Liqueur (17.5% ABV/35 proof): This dessert liqueur is made to appeal to chocolate lovers.

== Awards and accolades ==
Prichard's Tennessee Whiskey and various other Prichard's spirits have earned awards from the American Distilling Institute and Ultimate Spirits Challenge on several occasions, as listed below.

Lincoln County Lightning was rated by Southern Living as the "#2 Legal Moonshine in the U.S."

For its rums, Prichard's won gold and silver medals at the International Cane Spirits Festival across a span of several years (2006–2009): Fine Aged Rum (Gold), Crystal Rum (Gold), Peach Mango Rum (Gold and Silver), and Key Lime Rum (Gold). Additionally, the American Distilling Institute gave the distillery's aged rum a silver medal in 2007, and the Ultimate Spirits Challenge recognized the Aged Rum, Crystal Rum, and Private Stock Rum with ratings and recommendations that ranged from good to very good in 2012.

In liqueurs, Sweet Lucy received a gold medal from the American Distilling Institute in 2010 and an excellent rating and recommendation in the Ultimate Spirits Challenge in 2012.

Double Barreled Bourbon	2011 American Distilling Institute	Silver, Best of Category
Double Barreled Bourbon	2011 Ultimate Spirits Challenge	95 – Extraordinary, Ultimate Recommendation
Double Barreled Bourbon	2012 Ultimate Spirits Challenge	95 – Extraordinary, Ultimate Recommendation
Double Barreled Bourbon	2014 Ultimate Spirits Challenge	94 – Excellent, Highly Recommended
Double Barreled Bourbon	2017 Ultimate Spirits Challenge	93 – Excellent, Highly Recommended
Double Barreled Bourbon	2017 American Distilling Institute	Silver, Best of Category
Double Chocolate Whiskey	2012 Ultimate Spirits Challenge	90 – Excellent, Highly Recommended
Tennessee Whiskey	2010 American Distilling Institute	Silver
Tennessee Whiskey	2012 Ultimate Spirits Challenge	88 – Very Good, Strong Recommendation
Rye Whiskey	2012 Ultimate Spirits Challenge	90 – Excellent, Highly Recommended
Tennessee Malt Whiskey	2010 American Distilling Institute	Silver
Tennessee Malt Whiskey	2012 Ultimate Spirits Challenge	81 – Good, Recommended
Lincoln County Lightning	2012 Ultimate Spirits Challenge	85 – Very Good, Strong Recommendation
