= Raise.com =

Online marketplace for gift cards

Raise Marketplace
- Company type: Privately owned
- Headquarters: Chicago, Illinois, U.S.
- Area served: United States
- Founder: George Bousis
- CEO: George Bousis
- Industry: eCommerce
- Website: www.raise.com
- Launched: 2013

Raise.com is an e-commerce platform owned and operated by Raise that enables third-party individuals to sell Gift Cards on a fixed-price online marketplace alongside Raise's regular offerings. The company is based in Chicago, Illinois, and was launched in 2013 by founder George Bousis, who still remains the Executive Chairman and CEO.

== History ==
Raise.com was initially conceived as a spinoff of another service created by Bousis and Bradley Wasz, called CouponTrade, which was founded in 2010.

Since that time, the marketplace became more amenable to Bousis' idea. As stated by Crain's Chicago Business column, "a 2009 federal law prevented gift cards from expiring for five years; cards went from a magnetic stripe to all-digital in 2010; and advances in mobile technology made it possible to buy and sell cards on a smartphone."

It was founded in 2013, with $18 million in funding from Bessemer Venture Funding. It received $56 million from New Enterprise Associates in 2015.

In 2015, Raise.com acquired Tastebud Technologies for an undisclosed amount. Its CEO, Tyler Spalding, became chief strategy officer at Raise.

In June 2016, Raise acquired Slide for an undisclosed amount in stock, a company which allows people to store gift cards in a digital wallet/passbook. Raise also announced plans to open a New York office.

As of 2016, the company was valued at about $1 billion by the New York Times.

In late 2018, Raise appointed a new CEO, Jay Klauminzer, who had been an executive at Groupon and DoorDash.

== Business model ==
Raise.com takes a 12% cut from the sale of every gift card.

In the period between funding – in 2014, Raise.com released a mobile app (iOS only) version of its marketplace.

Raise.com also has partnerships with "over a dozen undisclosed retailers so far who are interested in the sorts [of] consumer shopping insights Raise can provide."

Raise has a one-year money back guarantee on purchases made directly through the marketplace.

== Gift card fraud ==
Some users of Raise.com have experienced gift card fraud, typically executed by people who steal items under the return receipt requirements of stores and then requesting gift cards. Generally, customer service regarding fraudulent gift cards receives minimal complaints, and most receive a 100%+ refund. As AdvisoryHQ states, "Many of the negative Raise reviews on this review site are from buyers who waited until after Raise's 100-day money back guarantee had expired before trying to use their gift card – only to discover that the card was invalid or had a different value than expected."
