= Old Ezra 101 =

- Type: Bourbon whiskey
- Manufacturer: MGP Ingredients
- Country of origin: Kentucky, United States
- Alcohol by volume: 50.50%
- Proof (US): 101
- Related products: Heaven Hill

Old Ezra 101 is a brand of Kentucky Straight Bourbon Whiskey owned and marketed by MGP Ingredients. Is bottled under the name Ezra Brooks Distilling. It is charcoal filtered and typically bottled at 50.5% abv (101 proof).

The Old Ezra brand is owned by Luxco of St. Louis (formerly the David Sherman Company), which formerly didn't own a distillery. Old Ezra is distilled, aged, and bottled in Kentucky by Heaven Hill Distilleries for Luxco. Luxco opened Lux Row Distillery, located in Bardstown Kentucky.

== Parent History ==
In 2006, the David Sherman Company re-branded itself to Luxco as a tribute to one of its co-founders, Paul Lux, and as a reflection of the current ownership of the company. As Luxco has grown it has remained family-owned.

The company was born of humble beginnings back in 1958 when Paul A. Lux and David Sherman Sr. established the David Sherman Corporation as a private label bottler to serve the needs of distributors, wholesalers and retailers in the mid-west around St. Louis, Chicago and Milwaukee. During that time, Old Ezra was an 11-year-aged, 101-Proof bourbon whiskey. Since that time, the company has grown into a major producer, bottler, importer and marketer with an impressive portfolio of over 50 wine and spirit brands. Some of the whiskey brands that Luxco produces include: Ezra Brooks Kentucky Bourbon Whiskey, Rebel Yell, Bourbon Supreme, Yellowstone, Rebel Reserve, Wallstreet Whiskey, D. Nicholson 1843, and Davies County.

In April 2021, MGP Ingredients completed its acquisition of Luxco.

== Bottle types ==
The label itself has previously been compared in its own print advertising to Jack Daniel's, which itself borrowed its shape from Evan Williams. The product was formerly distributed in elaborate decanter-like bottles. It used to be sold in bottles with a cork cap, but now has a plastic replic-cork (plastic cap with a cork plug). The nature of its aging and the time over which it is aged combine to give it a rich, dark brown color that is visible through the bottle.

== Varieties ==
Old Ezra Aged 7 Years (101 proof)
Ezra Brooks Black Label Kentucky Sour Mash (90 proof)
Ezra Brooks Blended Whiskey (80 proof)
Ezra Brooks Bourbon Creme (25 proof)
