= Very Old Barton =

Bourbon whiskey

Very Old Barton 6 Year 80prf 750ml
- Type: Bourbon whiskey
- Manufacturer: The Sazerac Company
- Origin: Kentucky, United States
- Alcohol by volume: 40%, 43%, 45%, and 50%
- Proof (US): 80, 86, 90, and 100
- Related products: Barton Brands

Very Old Barton is a Kentucky Straight Bourbon Whiskey produced in Bardstown, Kentucky and aged 4 or 6 years by the Sazerac Company at its Barton Distillery. It is bottled in 80-, 86-, 90- and 100-proof (US) expressions. The 100-proof expression was once age stated at 6 years and bottled-in-bond, but those designations have been progressively removed as they have moved to blending younger whiskey. Tasting notes: "Rich, tawny amber hue. Lean woody aroma. A firm attack leads to a medium bodied palate with a drying woody character. Dry, warm finish."

Jim Murray's Whisky Bible has given Very Old Barton 80 Proof a 90.5 rating. On February 16, 2011, Very Old Barton 100 Proof tied with Evan Williams "Black Label" as "Best Buy Whisk(e)y of the Year" in the 17th Annual Whisky Advocate Whisky Awards.
