= Old Thompson =

Old Thompson is a brand of blended American whiskey produced by Barton Brands, which has been owned by the Sazerac Company since 2009. It is known for its low price among brands of American whiskey. The company refers to it as "an excellent value". The brand dates back to 1904, when it was introduced by the Glenmore Distillery Company, which at the time was owned by the brothers James Thompson and Francis P. Thompson.

Today it is a blended whiskey bottled at 40% alcohol by volume (80 U.S. proof), and formulated from a mixture of 80% neutral grain spirits, and 20% straight whiskeys.
