= Ten High =

American whiskey brand

Ten High Whiskey
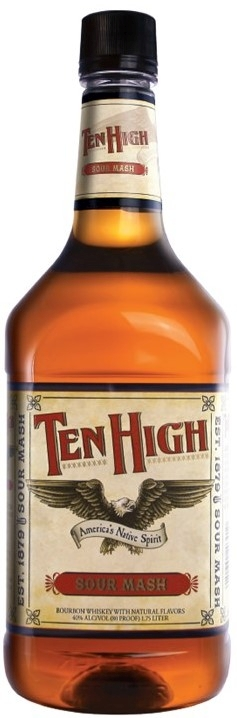
- Ten High Sour Mash Whiskey 1.75L
- Type: whiskey
- Manufacturer: Sazerac Company
- Origin: Kentucky, United States
- Introduced: 1930s
- Alcohol by volume: 40.00%
- Proof (US): 80
- Related products: Barton Brands

Ten High is a brand of American whiskey first introduced in the 1930s by Hiram Walker & Sons, now produced by the Barton Brands division of the Sazerac Company. The name Ten High refers to a barrel storage location at least ten ricks high, as barrels in the upper part of the aging warehouse mature faster. Although the brand name evoked this storage method, the manufacturer did not actually promise that the brand was from barrels aged in such locations.

== History ==
The brand was originally produced by Hiram Walker & Sons (a company owned by Harry C. Hatch at the time) at a distillery in Peoria, Illinois, starting shortly after the end of Prohibition in 1933. It was a major brand (and the leading brand of Illinois-made bourbon) until the late 1960s when the American whiskey market went through a particularly difficult period. The Peoria distillery stopped distilling operations in 1973 and closed completely in 1981. In 1987, Hiram Walker was bought by Allied-Lyons, which became Allied Domecq in 1994, since 2005 part of Pernod-Ricard. After the Peoria distillery closed, production moved first to Heaven Hill and later to Barton, both based in Bardstown, Kentucky. According to the United States Patent and Trademark Office (USPTO), in 2025 the trademark Ten High is still owned by Pernod-Ricard.

From the early 1980s until the late 2000s, Ten High was a straight Bourbon whiskey. Starting in 2009, the brand switched to being labelled "Bourbon – a blend", a designation for a product that is 51 percent straight Bourbon, with the remainder neutral spirits.
