= Kentucky Tavern =

American bourbon whiskey

Kentucky Tavern Bourbon Whiskey
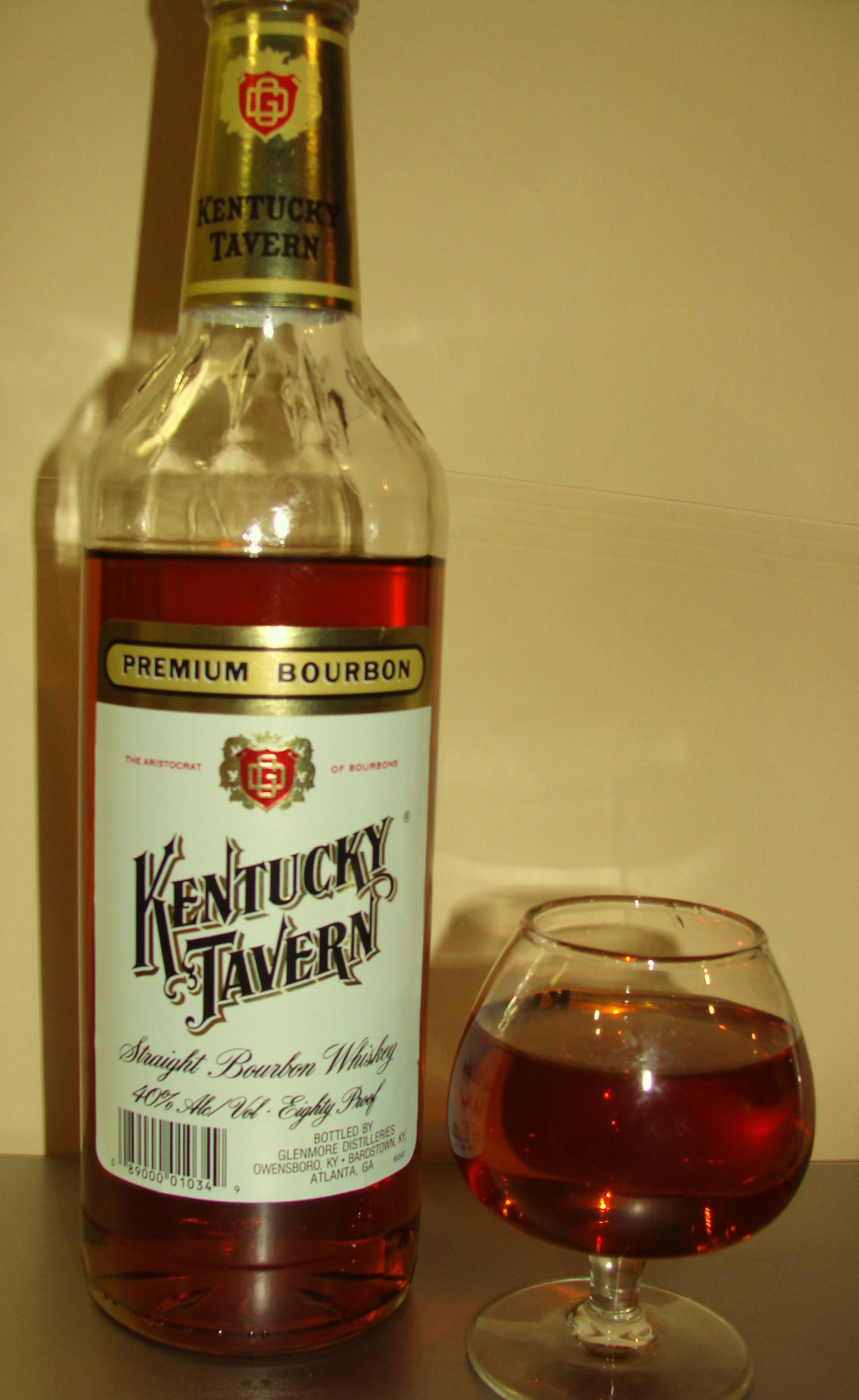
- Kentucky Tavern
- Type: Bourbon whiskey
- Manufacturer: Sazerac Company
- Origin: Kentucky, United States
- Introduced: 1880
- Alcohol by volume: 40.00%
- Proof (US): 80
- Related products: Barton Brands Glenmore Distillery Company

Kentucky Tavern is a brand of straight bourbon whiskey produced by the Sazerac Company at the Barton Distillery located in Bardstown, Kentucky, who acquired the brand from United Distillers in 1995. The brand was originally produced and owned by the R. Monarch Distillery (RD #24, 2nd Dist.) of Owensboro, Kentucky, which entered bankruptcy in 1898 and was purchased by James Thompson in 1901 who renamed the company Glenmore Distillery Company with locations in Owensboro and Louisville, Kentucky. In 1903 the Kentucky Tavern trademark was first registered. Glenmore proved a successful and durable company, its main brand being Kentucky Tavern. It is usually produced as an 80 proof liquor, although a 100 proof is also available.

It bears resemblance in color and flavor to that of Kentucky Gentleman, which is also produced by Barton Distilleries.

Kentucky Tavern is relatively affordable for bourbon and can be purchased in 200 ml, 375 mL, 750 mL, 1 L and 1.75 L quantities.

In March 2009, the Sazerac Company of New Orleans purchased the Tom Moore distillery and many brands owned by Constellation Spirits (formerly Barton Brands) as part of a $334 million transaction.
