= American whiskey =

Type of distilled liquor produced in the United States

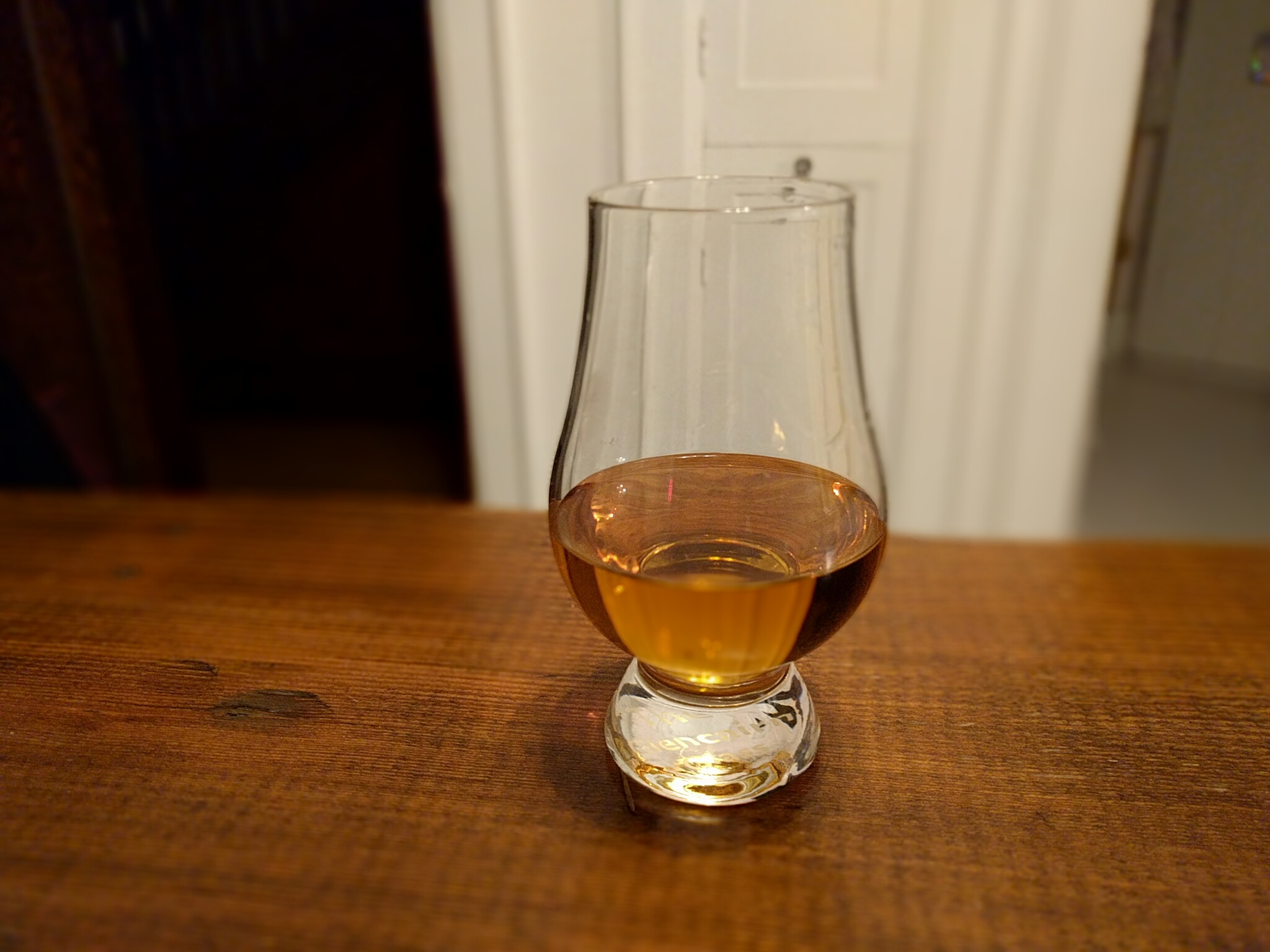
- A glass of bourbon
- Type: Distilled beverage
- Introduced: 17th century
- Alcohol by volume: At least 40%
- Proof (US): 80 and higher
- Colour: Pale gold to dark amber
- Ingredients: Malt, water

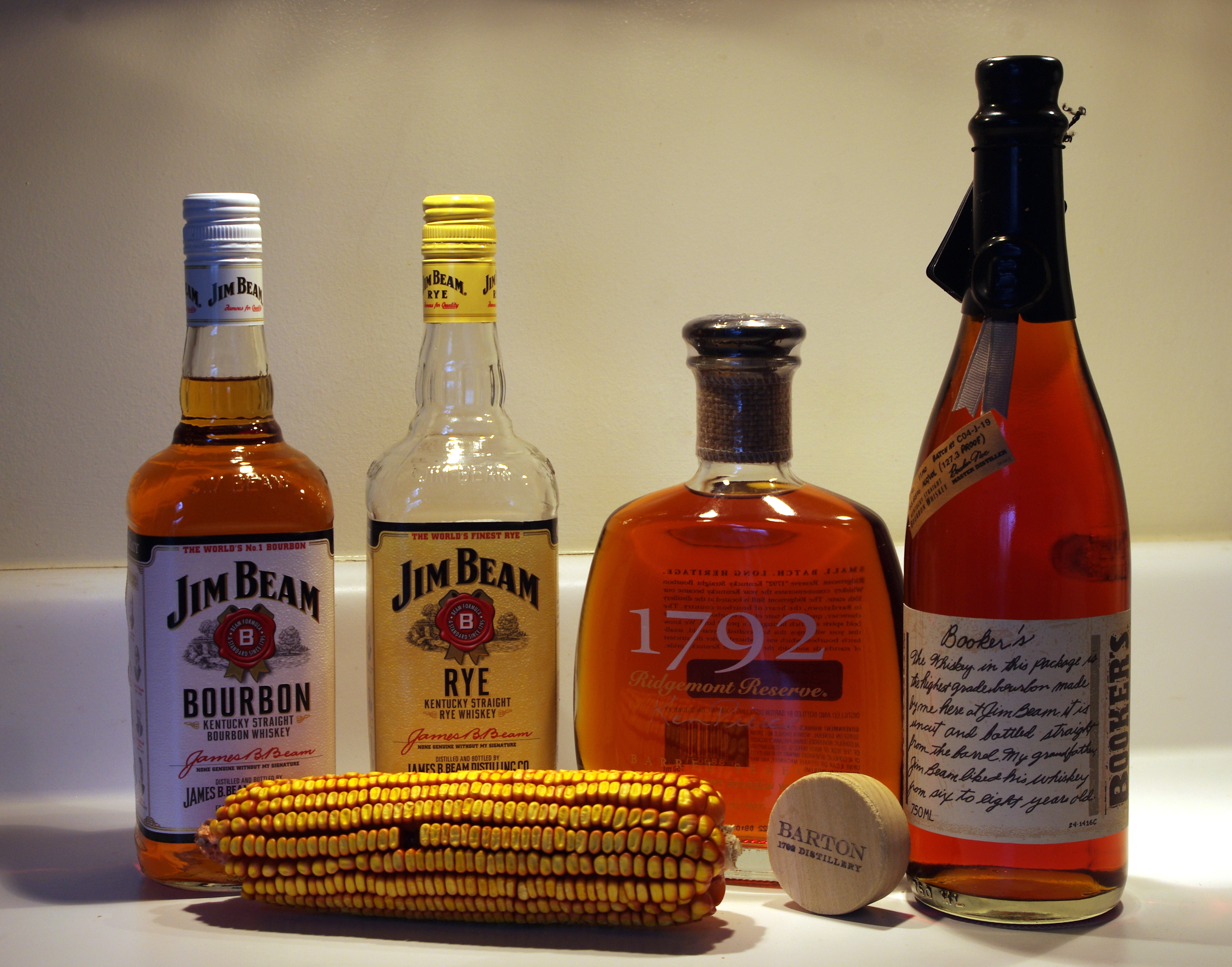
A selection of American whiskies. The predominant variety, Bourbon whiskey, is made mostly of corn.

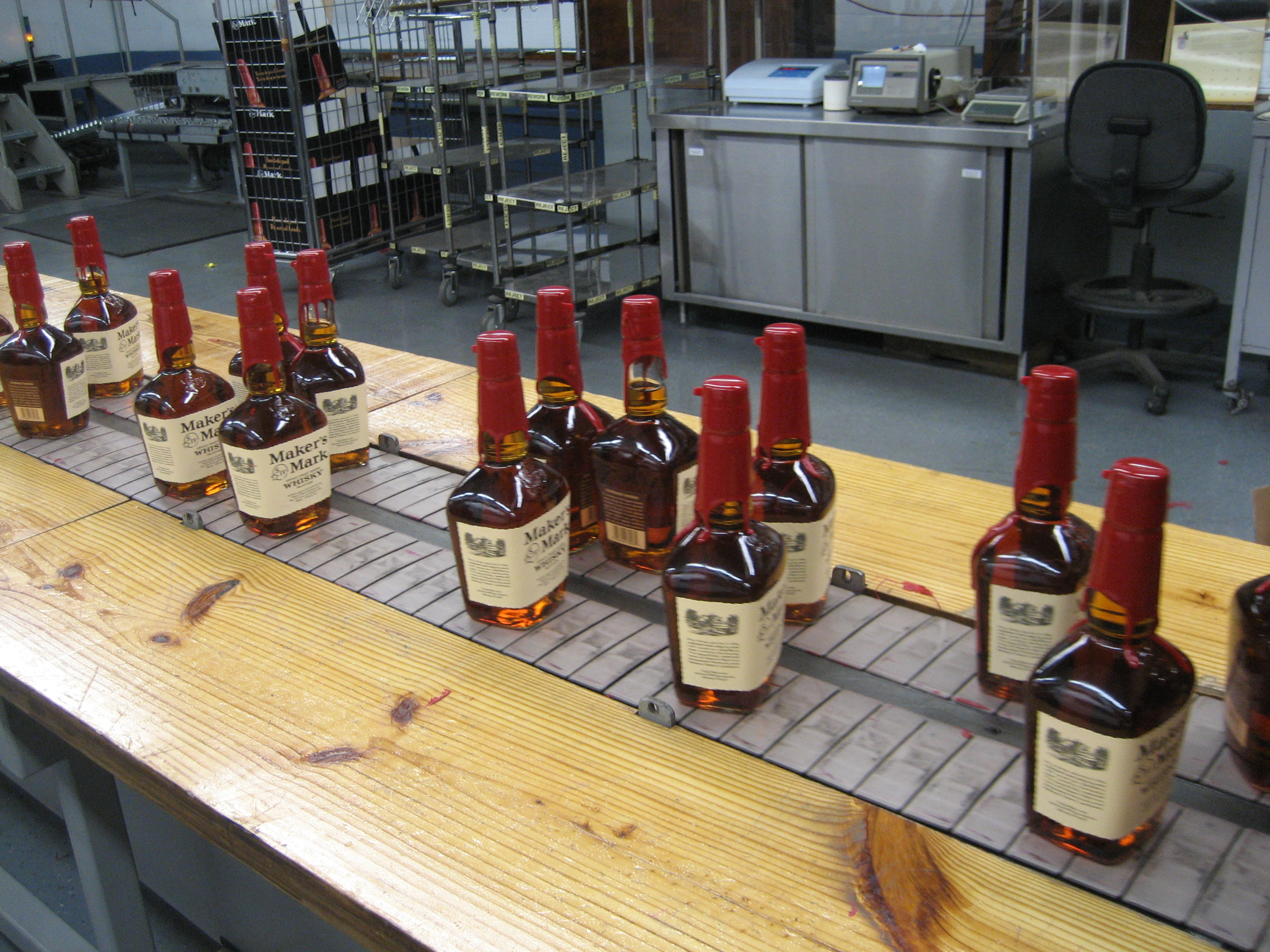
The production line at the Maker's Mark bourbon distillery in Loretto, Kentucky

American whiskey is whiskey (a distilled beverage produced from a fermented mash of cereal grain) produced in the United States. The best known American whiskey is straight whiskey, which is characterized by a mash consisting of a predominant grain (at least 51% of the mash) and, with some exceptions, aged in new charred white oak barrels. Examples of straight whiskeys include bourbon whiskey, rye whiskey, Tennessee whiskey, rye malt whiskey, malt whiskey, wheat whiskey, and corn whiskey.

Other American whiskeys include blended whiskeys, light whiskeys, and spirit whiskeys. Laws regulating the products vary between those produced for sale in the U.S. and those exported abroad.

== History ==
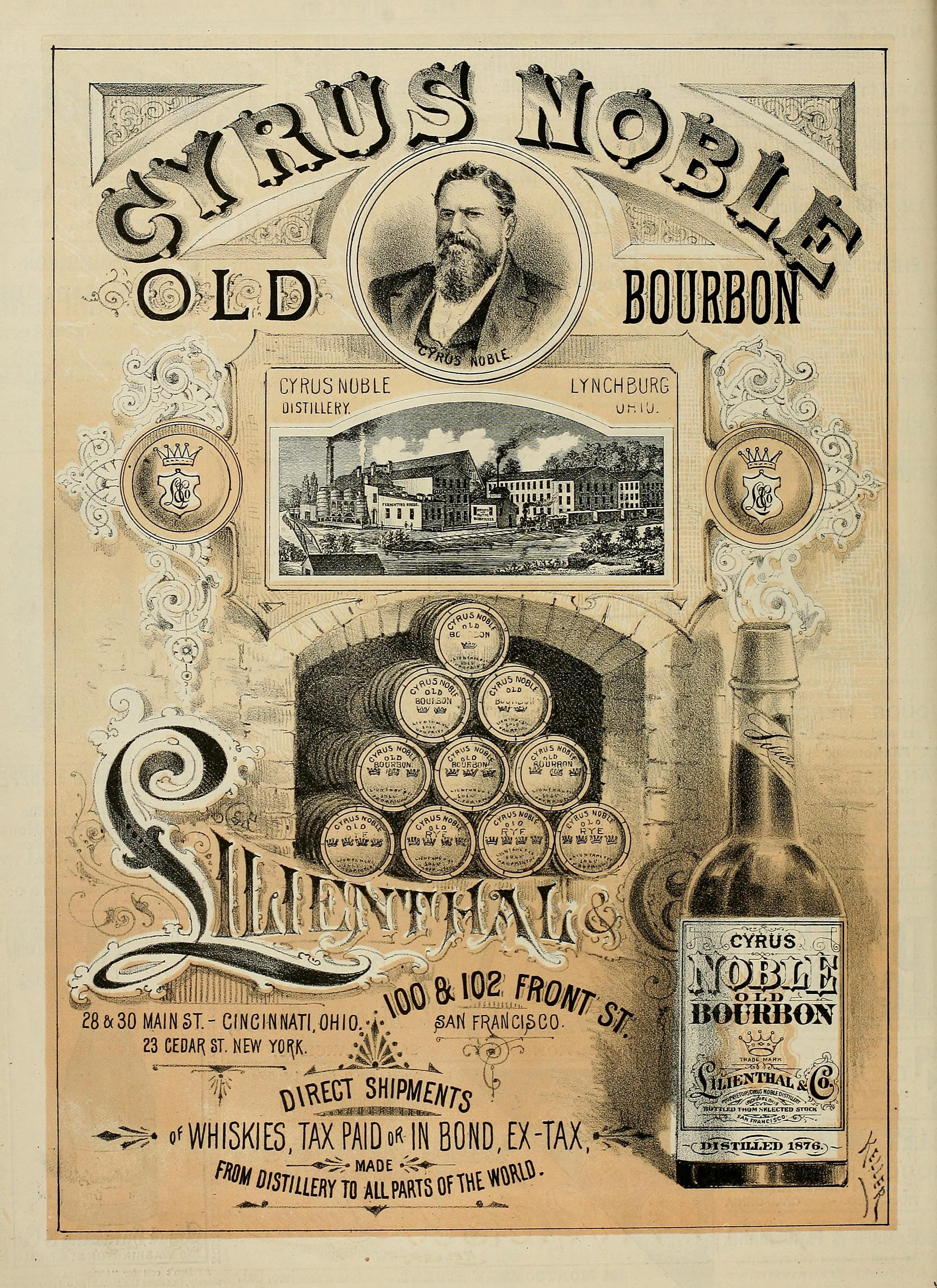
An 1882 advertisement for Cyrus Noble Old Bourbon, a defunct brand from Lynchburg, Ohio.

=== Colonial America ===
In the 1600s, European settlers brought distillation techniques with them. Whiskey distillation became common in the colonies, especially Rye Whiskey in Pennsylvania, Maryland, and New York, where rye was abundant.

By the late 1700s, American farmers, particularly in the western frontier regions (such as Kentucky and Tennessee), began producing whiskey in large quantities. The combination of fertile land and a growing demand for distilled spirits led to the rise of whiskey as a major industry in the United States.

Bourbon Whiskey, began to develop in the late 18th century by Scots, Scots-Irish, and other settlers (including English, Irish, Welsh, German, and French) who began to farm the area in earnest. Bourbon’s distinct flavor profile was influenced by the local grain, primarily corn, and its aging process in charred oak barrels.

=== Whiskey Rebellion ===
In 1791, the first federal whiskey tax was introduced by Alexander Hamilton under President George Washington’s administration, aiming to fund war debt. (the spirit had yet to overtake rum in production). This tax was highly unpopular and led to the Whiskey Rebellion of 1794, a significant event in American history.

=== Bottled-in-Bond Act ===
The Bottled-in-Bond Act of 1897 was enacted to allow for a governmental guarantee that whiskey (and other spirits) would be produced to a set of standards for composition and aging. To be labelled as such the whiskey must be the product of one season (January to June, July to December), distilled to not more than 80 percent, aged not less than four years, and bottled at 100 US proof (50 percent alcohol).

=== Expansion of whiskey ===
While the U.S. expanded westward in the 1800s, whiskey played a crucial role in frontier life. Whiskey was a widely traded commodity, often used as currency in frontier settlements where money was scarce.

Tennessee whiskey became popular in the late 1800s, especially in Lynchburg, Tennessee. Tennessee whiskey was similar to bourbon but went through an additional process called the Lincoln County Process, which involved filtering the whiskey through charcoal before aging it.

=== Prohibition ===
The temperance movement forced the closure of several distilleries across the country, culminating in the 1920 enactment of the Eighteenth Amendment and Prohibition. Among other concessions, the U.S. government had provided ten licenses to allow companies to manufacture or provide whiskey for medicinal purposes. Six licenses were ultimately granted to: Brown-Forman, Frankfort Distilleries, the A. Ph. Stitzel Distillery, the American Medicinal Spirits Company, Schenley Industries and James Thompson and Brother. Prohibition's repeal in 1933 spurred several former distillers to rebuild or reestablish their brands.

=== Post-Prohibition ===
With the repeal of Prohibition in 1933, whiskey production came back into the legal fold and distilleries resumed operation, and new innovations, such as the creation of more branded products, began to take shape. Bourbon and Tennessee whiskey brands like Jim Beam and Jack Daniel's grew in popularity becoming household names both in the U.S. and abroad. The rise of international markets, coupled with the increasing interest in cocktails and American-style drinks, helped bourbon and Tennessee whiskey become globally recognized.

In the 1980s distillers began focusing on small-batch and artisanal products like Maker's Mark and Old Rip Van Winkle.

=== The modern era ===
In the 21st century, the American whiskey industry has undergone a resurgence, characterized by the growth of small, craft distilleries, experimentation with new styles, and a renewed interest in heritage methods. Rye whiskey enjoyed a revival, thanks to its use in craft cocktails and as an alternative to bourbon. Also, whiskey producers have experimented with different cask finishes, such as port, rum, and sherry casks, and the use of innovative grains like quinoa and millet.

In December 2024 a new category was introduced. The Alcohol and Tobacco Tax and Trade Bureau has officially recognised American single malt as a whiskey category.

== Regulations ==
The production and labeling of American whiskey is governed by Title 27 of the U.S. Code of Federal Regulations. Outside of the U.S., various other countries recognize certain types of American whiskey, such as bourbon and Tennessee whiskey, as indigenous products of the U.S. that must be produced (although not necessarily bottled) in the U.S. When sold in another country, American whiskey may also be required to conform to local product requirements that apply to whiskey in general when sold in that country. In some cases, this may involve stricter standards than U.S. law.

Canadian law requires that products labeled as bourbon or Tennessee whiskey must satisfy the laws of the U.S. that regulate its manufacture "for consumption in the United States". Some other countries do not specify this requirement. This distinction can be significant, as U.S. regulations include substantial exemptions for products that are made for export rather than for consumption within the U.S.

== Production ==
According to the Distilled Spirits Council of the United States, whiskey sales will reach $5.1 billion in 2023, with the majority of sales being bourbon. The capacity has also increased to over two million barrels annually since 2019. It is predicted that the global whiskey market will reach $127 billion by 2028.

== Types ==
Some key types of American whiskey listed in the U.S. Code of Federal Regulations include:

- Rye whiskey, made from mash that consists of at least 51% rye
- Rye malt whiskey, made from mash that consists of at least 51% malted rye
- Bourbon whiskey, made from mash that consists of at least 51% corn (maize)
- Corn whiskey, made from mash that consists of at least 80% corn
- Malt whiskey, made from mash that consists of at least 51% malted barley
- Wheat whiskey, made from mash that consists of at least 51% wheat

To be labeled as one of these types, the whiskey must be distilled to no more than 80% alcohol by volume (160 U.S. proof) to ensure the flavor of the original mash is adequately retained and the addition of coloring, caramel, or other flavoring additives is prohibited. All of these, except corn whiskey, must be aged at least briefly (although no minimum aging period is specified) in charred new oak containers. These restrictions do not exist for some similarly named products in some other countries, such as Canada. American corn whiskey does not have to be aged at all – but, if it is aged, it must be aged in used or uncharred oak barrels "at not more than 62.5% alcohol by volume (125 proof)". In practice, if corn whiskey is aged, it is usually aged in used bourbon barrels.

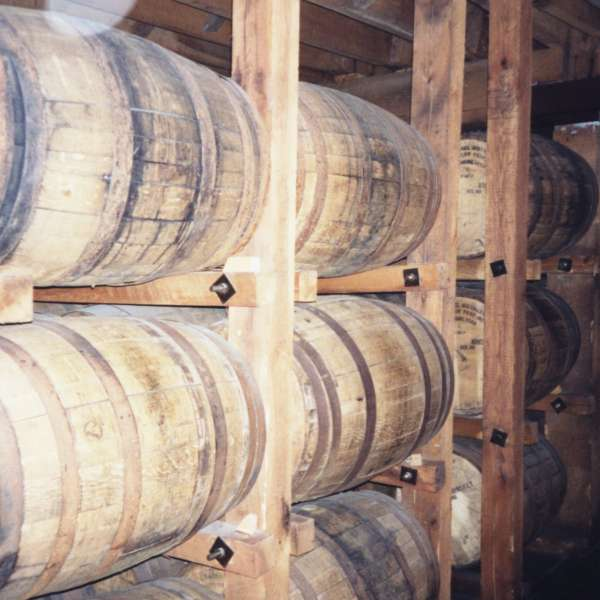
Tennessee whiskey aging in charred new oak barrels at the Jack Daniel's distillery

Straight whiskey is a whiskey that was distilled to not more than 80% alcohol by volume (160 proof) that has been aged for at least two years at a starting alcohol concentration of not more than 62.5%. It has not been blended with other spirits, colorings, or additives. A straight whiskey that also meets one of the above definitions is referred to by combining the term "straight" with the term for the type of whiskey. For example, a rye whiskey that meets this definition is called a "straight rye whiskey".

Unqualified "whiskey" without a grain type identification such as "bourbon", "rye", or "corn" must be distilled at less than 95% alcohol by volume (190 proof) from a fermented mash of grain in such a manner that the distillate possesses the taste, aroma, and characteristics generally attributed to whiskey. It must be stored in oak containers – charred new oak is not required – and bottled at no less than 40% alcohol by volume (80 proof). To carry the designation "straight whiskey" without a grain type identification, the fermented mash must be less than 51% of any one type of grain and must be stored for at least two years in charred new oak containers.

A straight whiskey that has been aged less than four years must be labeled with an age statement describing the actual minimum age of the product; whereas if straight whiskey is stored as prescribed for four years or more, a statement of age is optional.

Furthermore, a straight whiskey (or other spirit produced from a single class of materials) may be labeled as bottled in bond if it has been aged for at least four years in a federally bonded warehouse, is bottled at 50% alcohol by volume (100 proof), and is the product of one distilling season (defined as either the first or last half of a calendar year).

Other types of American whiskey defined by federal regulations include the following:

- Blended whiskey is a mixture that contains straight whiskey or a blend of straight whiskeys containing not less than 20 percent straight whiskey (on a proof gallon basis) and, separately or in combination, other whiskey or neutral spirits. For the blended whiskey to be labeled with a particular grain type (i.e., blended rye, malt, wheat, or bourbon whiskey), at least 51% of the blend must be straight whiskey of that grain type. The part of the content that is not straight whiskey may include unaged grain distillates, grain neutral spirits, flavorings, and colorings.
- Blend of straight whiskeys is a mixture of one or more straight whiskeys that either includes straight whiskeys produced in different U.S. states or coloring and flavoring additives (and possibly other approved "blending materials") or both, but does not contain grain neutral spirits.
- Light whiskey is produced in the United States at more than 80% alcohol by volume and stored in used or uncharred new oak containers.
- Spirit whiskey is a mixture of neutral spirits and at least 5% of specific stricter whiskey categories.

However, these various labeling requirements and "standards of identity" do not apply to products for export from the U.S. (under C.F.R. Title 27, § 5.1). Thus, exported American whiskey may not meet the same labeling standards when sold in some markets.

Another important American whiskey labeling is Tennessee whiskey. This is a recognized name defined under the North American Free Trade Agreement (NAFTA), at least one other international trade agreement, and the law of Canada as a straight bourbon whiskey lawfully produced in the state of Tennessee. Tennessee whiskey production is also governed by Tennessee law. Tennessee House Bill 1084 was passed in 2013 for products labeled as "Tennessee Whiskey" produced in the state. It included the existing requirements for bourbon and further required use of the Lincoln County Process for filtering the whiskey through a thick layer of maple charcoal before placing it in barrels for aging, with an exception grandfathered in for Benjamin Prichard's distillery in Kelso, Tennessee, which does not use it. The two major brands of Tennessee whiskey—Jack Daniel's and George Dickel—are both produced using the Lincoln County Process.

== Distilleries ==
Fourteen large distilleries owned by eight companies produce over 99% of the whiskey made in the U.S.

- Brown–Forman: Brown–Forman Distillery, Jack Daniel Distillery, and Woodford Reserve Distillery
- Campari: Wild Turkey Distillery
- Diageo: Bulleit Distillery, George Dickel Distillery
- Heaven Hill: Bernheim Distillery
- Kirin: Four Roses Distillery
- MGP Ingredients: Ross & Squib Distillery
- Sazerac; Barton 1792 Distillery and Buffalo Trace Distillery
- Suntory Global Spirits: Booker Noe Distillery, Jim Beam Distillery, and Maker's Mark Distillery

== See also ==
- Outline of whisky
- American Whiskey Trail
- Moonshine (home-distilled alcohol)
- List of cocktails made with whiskey
- List of whisky brands
- Whisky Competitions
