= Fleischmann's Spirits =

Brand of distilled spirits owned by Barton Brands

Fleischmann's is a brand of distilled spirits that includes vodka, gin, and blended whiskey. The brand is owned by Barton Brands, which is part of the Sazerac Company.

== Company history ==
In 1868 Charles and Maximillian Fleischmann and James Gaff, a distiller, founded the Fleischmann Co. to manufacture compressed yeast and distilled spirits. In 1870, the original Fleischmann plant was built at Riverside, Ohio, and it produced dry gin and domestic vodka. Sylvan Grove Bourbon was also produced at that distillery. In 1940, following Prohibition, Fleischmann acquired a distillery in Owensboro, Kentucky and moved spirits production there. In 1989, Glenmore Distillery Company acquired Fleischmann Distilling Co. In 1991, United Distillers acquired Glenmore, then sold it to Barton Brands in 1995, including the rights to the Fleischmann's brand. In 2009 the Sazerac Company of New Orleans acquired Barton Brands, including the Fleischmann's brand.
