= Evan Williams (bourbon) =

Brand of bourbon whiskey

Evan Williams Bourbon Whiskey
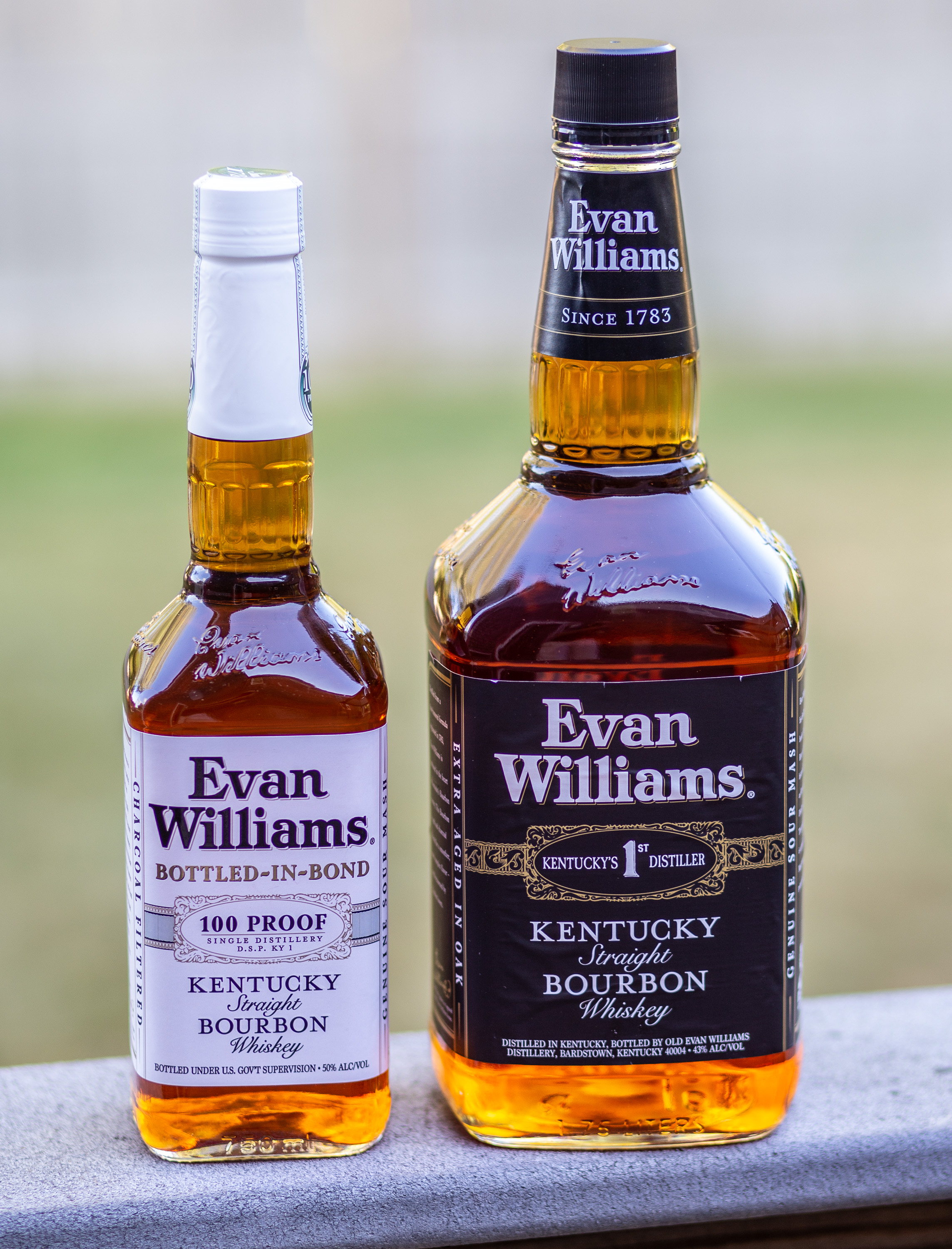
- Evan Williams white label and black label
- Type: Bourbon whiskey
- Manufacturer: Heaven Hill
- Origin: Kentucky, United States
- Introduced: 1957
- Alcohol by volume: 43%
- Proof (US): 86
- Related products: Heaven Hill
- Website: www.evanwilliams.com

Evan Williams is a brand of Kentucky straight bourbon whiskey bottled in Bardstown, Kentucky, by the Heaven Hill company. The product is aged for a minimum of four years (which is more than the two year minimum to be called 'straight' bourbon, but is the minimum requirement for a straight whiskey that does not have an age statement on the label). It has been ranked as one of the world's best selling whiskey brands.

Their product line includes flavored variations, about which The New York Times, citing Nielsen's data, wrote "now represent 3 percent of the $1.4 billion whiskey category."

== Production ==
Although bottled in Bardstown, the product is distilled at the Heaven Hill distillery in Louisville, Kentucky.

The "standard issue" Evan Williams bourbon is sold as the mass-market "Black Label" variety. The company also bottles several other varieties, including a "White Label" that is bottled in bond, an "Evan Williams 1783" bourbon that is produced in more limited quantities, and a 7–8 year old single barrel bourbon sold in vintage-dated bottles sealed with black wax. Occasionally available in some regions is a "Green Label" variety that is 80 proof and represents a younger, lighter-bodied version of the bourbon found in "Black Label" bottles at a more affordable price.

As of 2010, Evan Williams was the second-largest-selling brand of Kentucky straight bourbon (following the Japanese-owned, market-leading Jim Beam brand) and had the fastest-growing market share among the top-volume American whiskey brands (with a 12.4% sales growth rate), according to a press release issued by the producer citing A.C. Nielsen Scantrack 2010 data.

Evan Williams Black is 43% alc/vol (86 U.S. proof), unlike some popular whiskeys which are bottled at the statutory minimum of 40% alc/vol (80 proof).

== Origin of the name ==
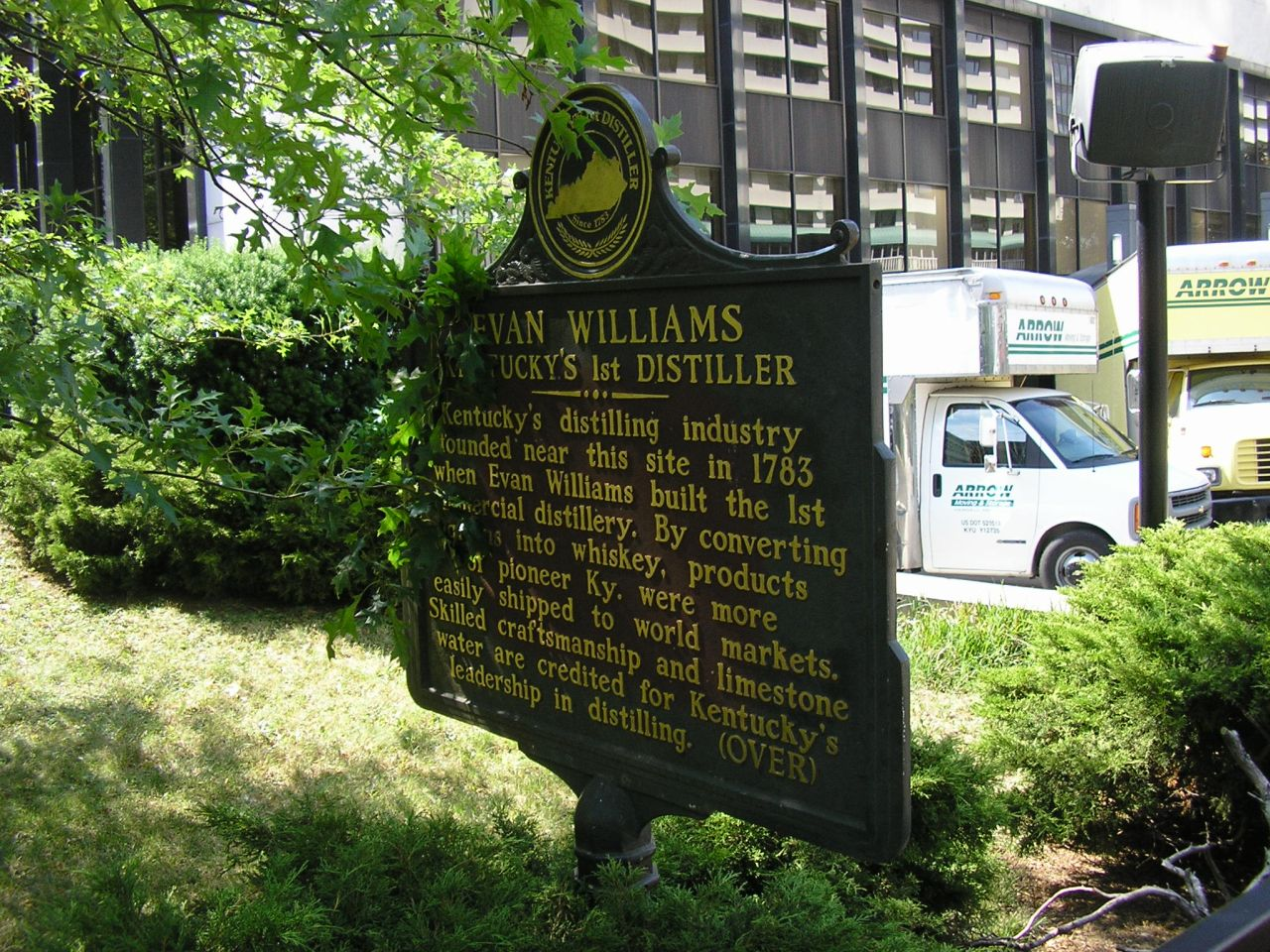
Historical marker for Evan Williams in Downtown Louisville, Kentucky

Evan Williams, a Welsh immigrant to North America, was born in Dale, Pembrokeshire, and emigrated to the United States towards the end of the 18th century. Williams settled in Kentucky and began distilling in 1783, in what is now Louisville, Kentucky. A historical marker in Louisville marks the site as Kentucky's first commercial distillery. Williams was elected to serve as the first wharf master of Louisville in 1797.

The bottle label of the best-selling variant, the black label, emphasizes this heritage — it bears the inscriptions "Since 1783" and "Kentucky's 1st distiller". However, the inscriptions should not be construed as indicating that the brand has continuously existed since the time of the historic distillery. The modern whiskey brand was introduced by the Heaven Hill company in 1957.

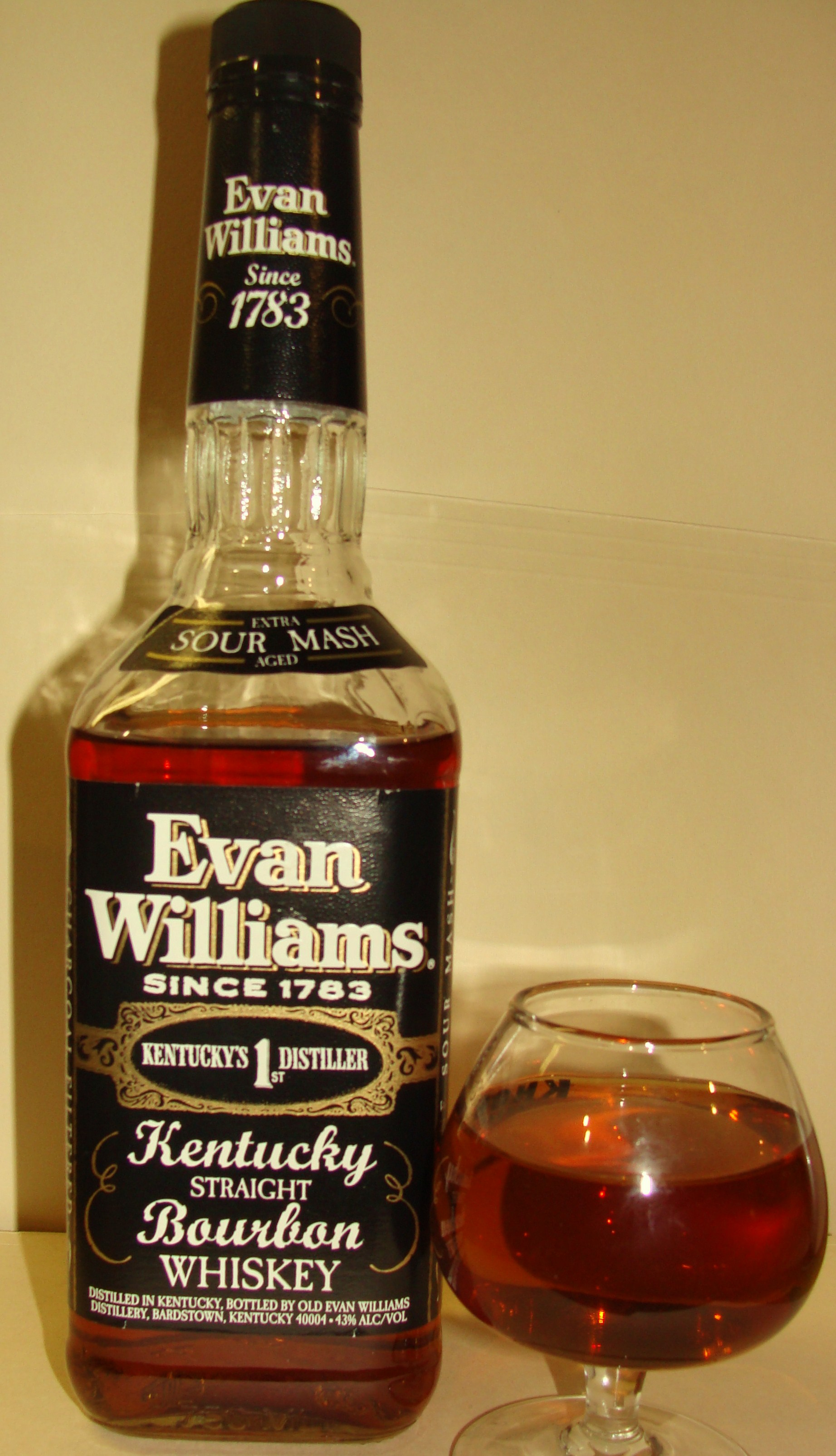
A bottle of Evan Williams.

Historian Michael Veach of the Filson Historical Society has stated that key details of the historical claims about Williams appear to be false. Veach said that the assertion that Williams was Kentucky's first distiller did not appear until an 1892 publication by Reuben Durrett, more than a century after the fact. He also said that the dating is disproved by a record of Williams traveling from London to Philadelphia in May 1794, showing that Williams could only have begun his distillery substantially later. Veach indicated that the true identity of Kentucky's first distiller may never really be known, since record-keeping about such matters was poor, and there are others that seem more likely as candidates for "first distiller", including Jacob Myers and the brothers Joseph and Samuel Davis. Records reportedly indicate that Myers and the Davis brothers both arrived in 1779.

The New York Times wrote that "popular brands such as Elijah Craig and Evan Williams were actually created by Jewish distillers adept in marketing." The Shapira brothers were co-founders of Heaven Hill, the company that acquired Evan Williams; Max Shapira and other descendants are the company's owners and continue to operate it. The name Evan Williams was patented in the 1960s.

== Varieties ==
Evan Williams Single Barrel Vintage Super-Premium Bourbon

Varieties of whiskey using the Evan Williams brand name include the following:

- Evan Williams Green Label, 80 proof
- Evan Williams White Label, 100 proof (bottled in bond)
- Evan Williams Black Label, 86 proof, designated as 7-year aged prior to dropping this designation in the early 2000s
- Evan Williams Single Barrel, 86 proof
- Evan Williams 1783, 86 proof, designated as 10-year aged prior to dropping this designation in the early 2000s
- Evan Williams 12 Year Red Label, 101 proof
- Evan Williams 23 year old blue label, 107 proof

Several liqueurs are also produced under the Evan Williams brand, including:

- Evan Williams Egg Nog, 30 proof, available during the Winter Holiday Season
- Evan Williams Honey Reserve, 70 proof, introduced in 2009
- Evan Williams Cherry Reserve, 70 proof, introduced in 2010
- Evan Williams Kentucky Cider, 34 proof
- Evan Williams Cinnamon Reserve, 70 proof, introduced in 2015

== Evan Williams Bourbon Experience ==
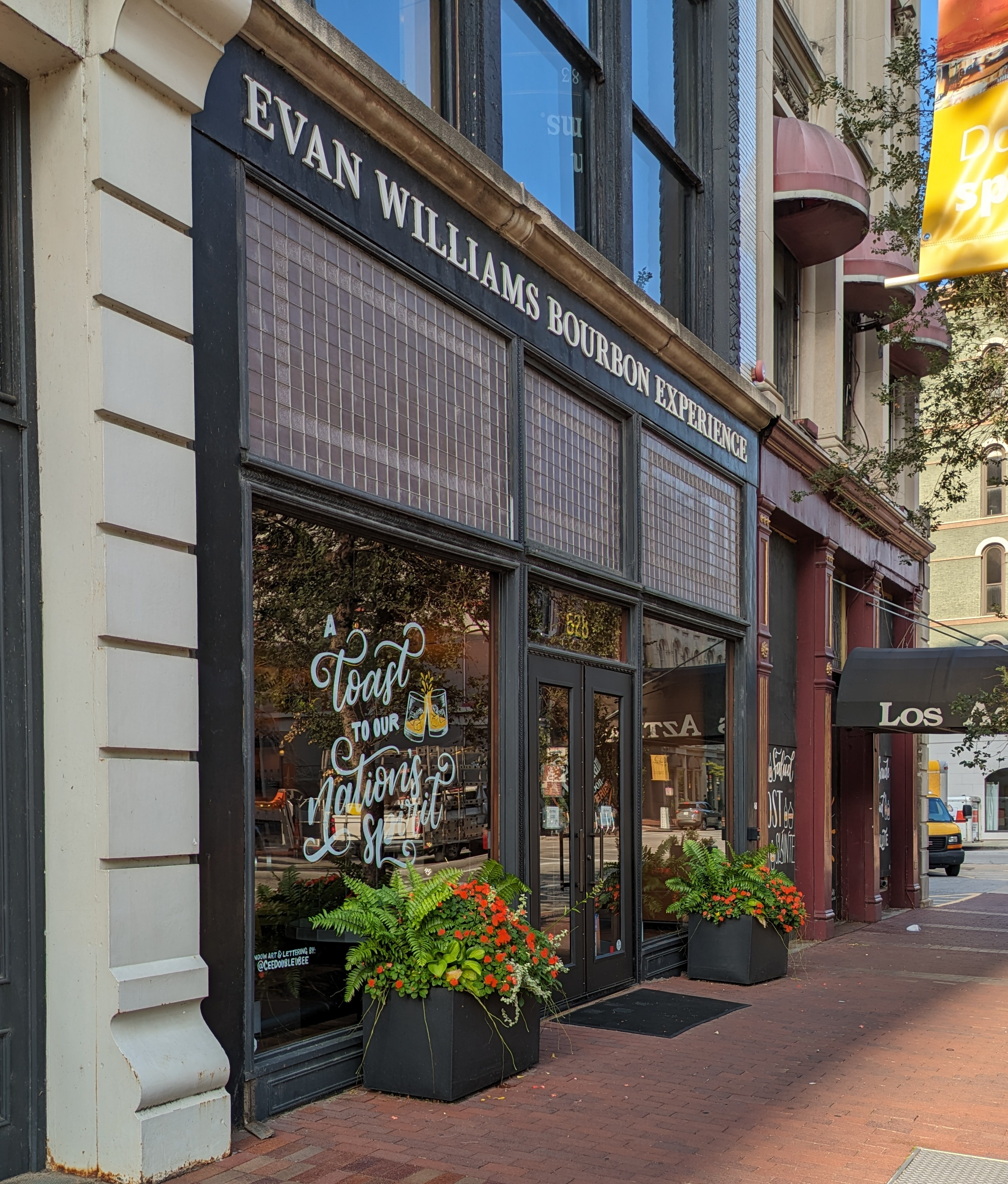
Evan Williams Bourbon Experience

The whiskey and its history are featured in the "Evan Williams Bourbon Experience", a tourist attraction in Louisville that is part of the Kentucky Bourbon Trail.

== Awards, reviews and sponsorships ==
On February 16, 2011, the "Black Label" expression tied with 100 proof Very Old Barton as "Best Buy Whisk(e)y of the Year" in the 17th Annual Malt Advocate Whiskey Awards.

The company sponsors sporting events and tournaments.

== See also ==
- Alcoholic beverage
- Jack Daniel's
- Jim Beam
- Maker's Mark
- Early Times
