= Calvert (liquor) =

American liquor brand

- Calvert Extra a Luxco owned brand of American Blended Whiskey.
- Type: Blended whiskey
- Manufacturer: Luxco
- Origin: Clermont, Kentucky United States
- Alcohol by volume: 40.00%
- Proof (US): 80
- Related products: Calvert

Calvert is a brand of spirits, that includes gin and blended whiskey. The brand is produced in Clermont, Kentucky and owned by Luxco which is headquartered in St. Louis, Missouri.

Calvert Extra is frequently referred to as cocktail whiskey because of its neutral spirit content. It is made from 70% grain neutral spirits and 30% straight whiskey. The high neutral spirit level makes it very unassuming so that it can be blended with any mixer and not overwhelm the cocktail. It is one of America's top selling blended whiskies. It is bottled at 80 proof (40% ABV). It is sold in glass in 16 oz pint bottles, glass 750 mL bottles, glass 1-liter bottles and plastic 1.75 L bottles.

== History ==
The Calvert brand was created in 1890 by the Calvert-Maryland Distilling Company. Named for the Calvert family, the holders of the title Baron Baltimore, and the founders of the Province of Maryland.

In the early 1900s, Lord Calvert whiskey was distilled in Maryland, and was referred to as medicinal.

The company name was changed to Calvert Distillers Company in October 1936. A 100-foot long light-up sign advertising the Calvert brand was constructed on the Miami side of Biscayne Bay in 1937.

The Calvert Distilling Company obtained the trademark for "Lord Calvert", for use with alcohol products from the United States Patent and Trademark Office on March 11, 1952. The trademark was transferred to Seagram on December 31, 1962. Ownership was transferred to Jim Beam on December 17, 1991, and then to Luxco, the current owner, on January 31, 2013.

== Products ==
- Calvert Extra
- Calvert Gin
- Lord Calvert Whiskey

=== Former ===
- Calvert Blended Whiskey (80 proof/40% ABV; previously 90 proof)
- Calvert Reserve: American Blended Whiskey (86 proof/43% ABV)
- Canadian Masterpiece by Lord Calvert
- Lord Calvert Rye (100 proof/50% ABV)

Calvert Cocktails

- Calvert Daiquiri: Made with Leilani Hawaiian Rum (60 proof/30% ABV)
- Calvert Extra Dry Martini: Made with Calvert Gin (70 proof/35% ABV)
- Calvert Gin Sour: Made with Calvert Distilled Gin (60 proof/30% ABV)
- Calvert Manhattan: Made with Calvert Extra Blended Whiskey The Soft Whiskey (60 proof/30% ABV)
- Calvert Margarita: Made with Imported Mariachi Tequila and Triple Sec (60 proof/30% ABV)
- Calvert Tequila Sour: Made with Our Own Imported Mexican Tequila and Curaçao (55 proof/27.5% ABV)
- Calvert Whiskey Sour: Made with Calvert Extra Blended Whiskey The Soft Whiskey (60 proof/30% ABV)
