= Corn whiskey =

American liquor made from corn

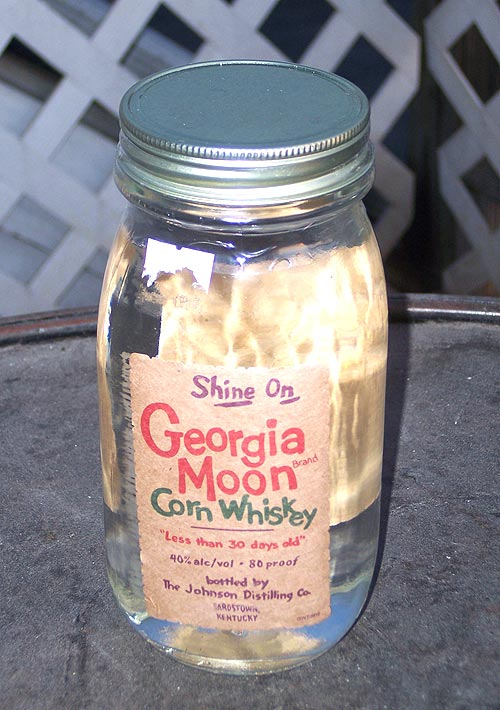
- A bottle of Georgia Moon corn whiskey, sold in the form of a mason jar
- Type: American whiskey
- Origin: United States
- Alcohol by volume: At least 40%
- Proof (US): At least 80°
- Colour: Clear or brown
- Ingredients: corn
- Related products: Bourbon whiskey, Moonshine, Straight whiskey, Tennessee whiskey, Bottled in bond

Corn whiskey is an American liquor made principally from corn. Distinct from the stereotypical American moonshine, in which sugar is normally added to the mash, corn whiskey uses a traditional mash process, and is subject to the tax and identity laws for alcohol under federal law.

== Legal requirements ==
Corn whiskey is made from a mash (mixture) of at least 80 percent corn and distilled to a maximum strength of 160 proof (80% alcohol by volume).

Unlike other American whiskey styles, corn whiskey is not required to be aged in wood. If aged, it must be in either uncharred or previously used oak barrels and must be barreled at lower than 125 proof (62.5% abv). In contrast, a whiskey distilled from a mash consisting of at least 80% corn in a charred new oak barrel would be considered bourbon. Aging is usually brief – six months or less – during which time the whiskey absorbs color and flavor from the barrel while the off-flavors and fusel alcohols are reduced. A variant called straight corn whiskey is also produced, in which the whiskey is stored in used or uncharred new oak containers for two years or more. Whiskeys produced in this manner and aged for at least four years can be designated bottled in bond if they meet additional requirements.

== Availability ==
Many American whiskey distillers include unaged corn whiskeys in their product lines along with bourbons and other styles. A few large whiskey producers make unaged corn whiskeys but most corn whiskeys are made by smaller distillers located all around the country.

== See also ==
- List of whiskey brands
- List of maize dishes
- Outline of whisky
