= 1792 Bourbon =

Kentucky straight Bourbon whiskey

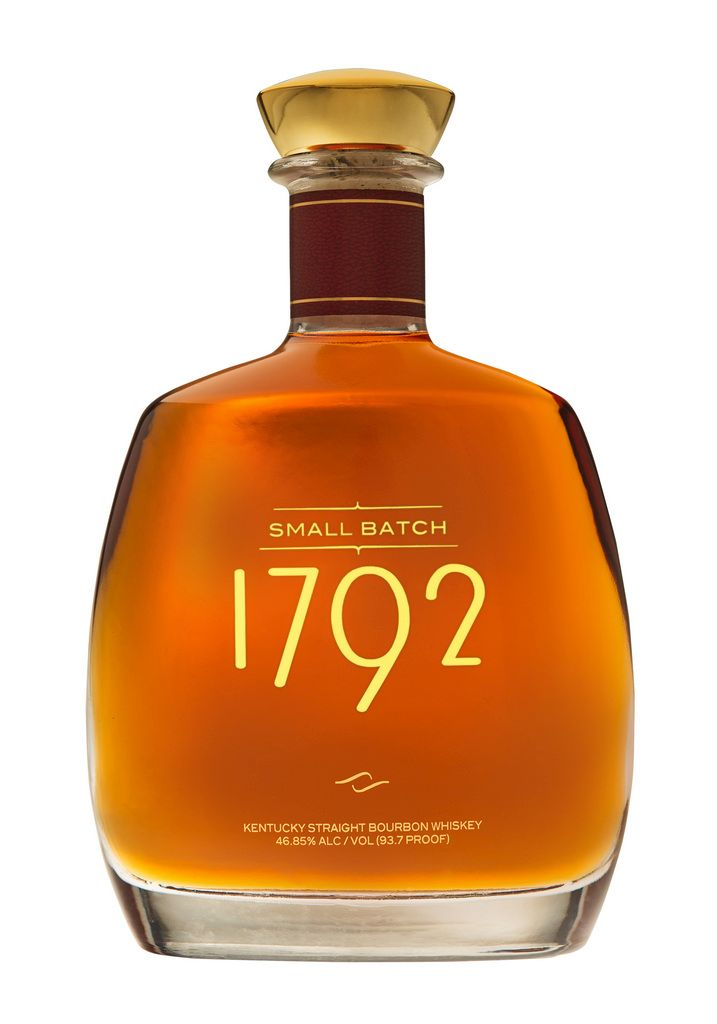
- 1792 Bourbon bottle
- Type: Bourbon whiskey
- Manufacturer: The Sazerac Company
- Origin: Kentucky, United States
- Introduced: 2002
- Alcohol by volume: 46.85%
- Proof (US): 93.7
- Related products: Barton Brands

1792 Bourbon, formerly known as Ridgewood Reserve 1792 and 1792 Ridgemont Reserve, is a Kentucky straight Bourbon whiskey produced since 2002 by the Barton 1792 Distillery in Bardstown, Kentucky. The brand and distillery have been owned by the Sazerac Company since 2009. It is part of a line of small-batch bourbons aimed at the high-end liquor market. It is sold at 93.7 U.S. proof (46.85% alcohol by volume).

The name of the bourbon is a reference to the year Kentucky became a state. The bourbon is positioned as a premium brand, and the pricing policy makes it a competitor to Knob Creek or Woodford Reserve. This reflects a trend in bourbon production, resulting from competition with single malt whisky, which makes small batch bourbons a big business.

When originally introduced, the bourbon carried a "Small Batch Aged 8 years" statement on the back label and "8-year-old" in the text printed on the back of the bottle. In December 2013, the age statement was dropped from the label and replaced with the wording "small batch bourbon whiskey" and the term "8-year-old" was removed from the text.

1792 Bourbon was originally introduced into the market by Barton as "Ridgewood Reserve 1792". The Brown-Forman Corporation sued Barton for trademark infringement, arguing that the similar name and bottle design of Ridgewood Reserve could potentially create consumer confusion with Brown-Foreman's older Woodford Reserve brand. A federal judge ruled in favor of Brown-Forman in 2004, and Barton changed the name of the product to "1792 Ridgemont Reserve" to comply with the ruling. The company later dropped the "Ridgemont Reserve" from the name, making it just "1792 Bourbon".

== See also ==
- List of whisky brands
