= Kentucky Gentleman =

Brand of Bourbon whiskey

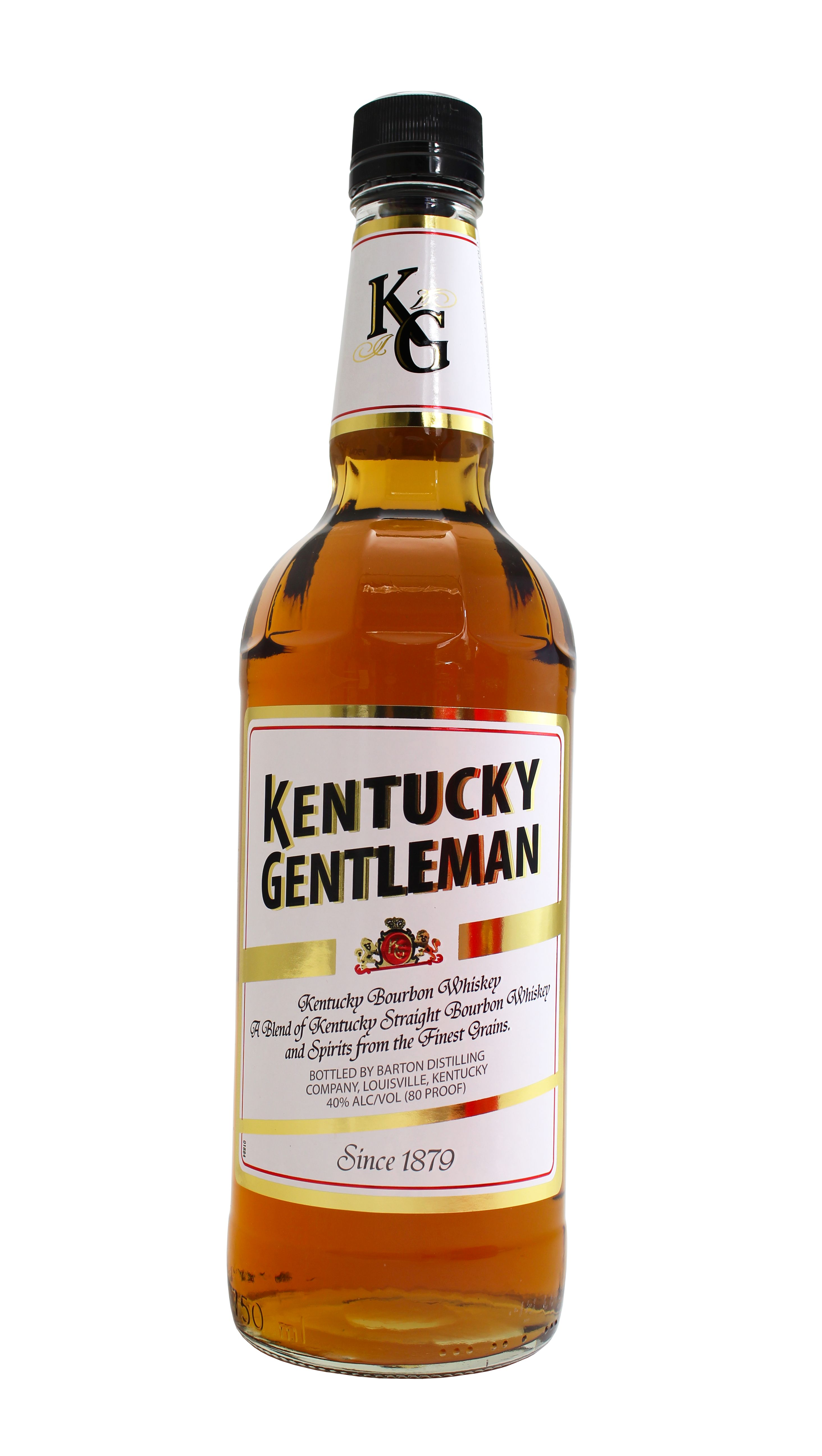
- Type: American whiskey
- Manufacturer: The Sazerac Company
- Country of origin: Kentucky, United States
- Alcohol by volume: 40.00%
- Proof (US): 80
- Related products: Barton Brands
- Website: www.sazerac.com

Kentucky Gentleman is a brand of whiskey produced by the Sazerac Company at its Barton 1792 distillery in Bardstown, Kentucky. The brand was sold as a blend of 51% straight bourbon and 49% neutral grain spirits and bottled at 40% alcohol by volume (80 U.S. proof). As of 2022, it is no longer a blended spirit, and the bottle claims it is true Bourbon. It is a relatively inexpensive brand.

== Reviews ==
- Whiskey Reviewer: "The phrase 'Kentucky Gentleman' implies a certain Southern genteelness, and frankly, no one possessed with such grace and class would ever stoop to drinking anything resembling Kentucky Gentleman whiskey."
- Cracked.com: "The concept of mixing nearly equal parts of bourbon and grain alcohol appealed to a demographic of bourbon lovers who do not want any recollection whatsoever of the night before. Its cheap price and convenient pint, liter, and half gallon sizes appeal to many college students and mobile home residents throughout the United States."

== Russian import ban ==
In August 2014, the Russian consumer protection agency Rospotrebnadzor announced that it had detected signs of organic chemicals called phthalates in Kentucky Gentleman and that importation of the brand into Russia would therefore be suspended. However, it has been suggested that the importation ban on Kentucky Gentleman should be viewed in the context of a broader dispute between the U.S. and Russia over trade in a wide variety of products as well as other issues such as the governance of Ukraine.
