= Ezra Brooks =

Brand of whiskey

- Type: Bourbon whiskey
- Manufacturer: MGP Ingredients
- Origin: Kentucky, United States
- Introduced: 1960; 66 years ago
- Alcohol by volume: 45.00%
- Proof (US): 90

Ezra Brooks is a brand of Kentucky straight bourbon whiskey owned and marketed by MGP Ingredients. It is primarily bottled at 40% abv (80 U.S. proof) or 45% abv (90 U.S. proof).

The Ezra Brooks brand was created by Frank Silverman in 1957 and was bottled at the Hoffman Distilling Company, in Lawrenceburg, Kentucky, up until Hoffman Distilling Co. went out of business in the 1970s. In 1993, Ezra Brooks was purchased by Luxco of St. Louis, Missouri (formerly the David Sherman Company, renamed in 2006). Ezra Brooks is distilled at Luxco's Lux Row Distillers in "bourbon county" Bardstown, Kentucky, along with Luxco's other whiskey brands Rebel Yell, David Nicholson, and Blood Oath.

In April 2021, MGP Ingredients completed its acquisition of Luxco.

== Varieties ==
- Ezra Brooks Black Label Kentucky Sour Mash
- Ezra Brooks 99 (99 proof)
- Old Ezra (101 proof, aged 7 years)
- Ezra Brooks Blended Whiskey (80 proof)
- Ezra Brooks Bourbon Creme (25 proof)
- Ezra B Single Barrel (99 proof, 12 years old) – No longer produced
- Ezra Brooks Cinnamon liqueur (70 proof) – No longer produced
- Ezra Brooks Straight Rye Whiskey (90 proof) aged 24 months

== In films ==
- A billboard advertising the Ezra Brooks brand was featured in the film The Sting. This was an anachronism, however. The film was set in 1936 while the Ezra Brooks brand would not appear for another 20 years.
- In the film Léon: The Professional, Gary Oldman's Character, Stansfield, picks up a bottle of Ezra Brooks whiskey in Mathilda's apartment.
- In the Japanese anime series Trigun season 1: episode 3 at 6:01, you can see a bottle of Ezra Brooks laying on the ground as the camera pans away from Vash and the drunkard.
