= Yellowstone Bourbon =

Brand of whiskey

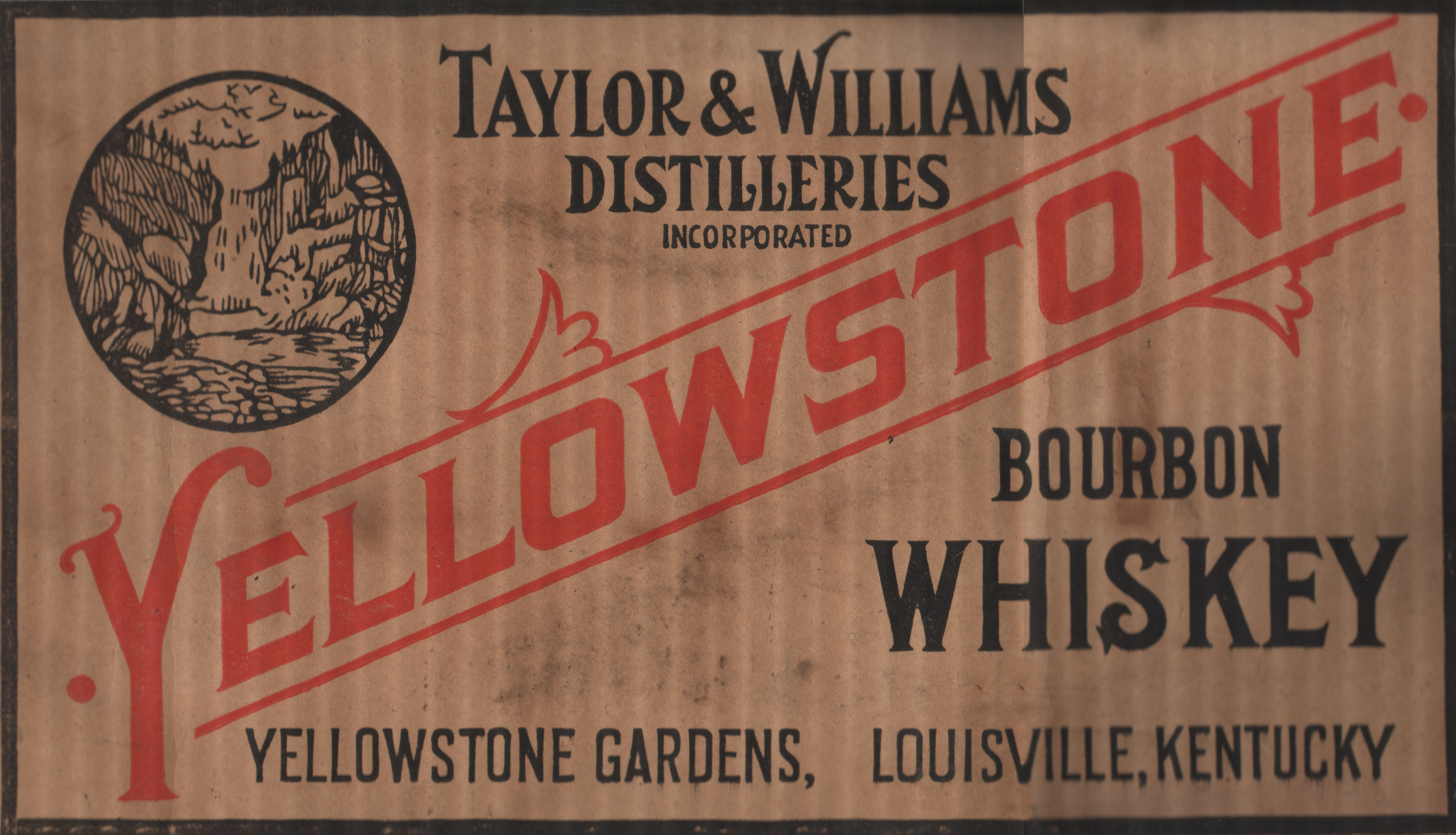
- Type: Bourbon whiskey
- Manufacturer: MGP Ingredients
- Origin: Kentucky, United States
- Alcohol by volume: 46.5
- Proof (US): 93

Yellowstone is an American brand of Kentucky Straight Bourbon Whiskey founded in 1872 and owned and marketed by MGP Ingredients. It is distilled by the Limestone Branch Distillery in Lebanon, Kentucky.

== History ==
The Yellowstone brand of bourbon was introduced in 1872 by the J. B. Dant Distillery in Gethsemani, Kentucky (near Bardstown in Nelson County).

In 1920, the Yellowstone Bourbon brand was produced by James Thompson and Brothers and was bottled for "medicinal purposes only" during Prohibition. Thompson and Brothers was one of only six companies that were granted permits to bottle medicinal whiskey (from existing stocks – distilling was not allowed).

The Glenmore Distillery Company of Owensboro, Kentucky, bought the brand in 1944. In the 1960s, Yellowstone was the largest selling brand in Kentucky.

The Thompson family maintained control of the company until 1991, at which time it was acquired by Guinness, which merged it with Schenley Industries and named the new entity United Distillers (now Diageo).

In 1993, United sold the Yellowstone brand to the David Sherman Company (later named Luxco) which continued to produce the brand from existing stocks. Luxco later contracted with Heaven Hill to distill bourbon for the brand and age them in Heaven Hill's warehouses. After aging, the whiskey was then shipped to Luxco's St. Louis facility where it was bottled and distributed.

In 2010, Paul and Steve Beam, descendants of J. W. Dant and the Beam family, founded the Limestone Branch Distillery in Lebanon, Kentucky. In 2015, they formed a business partnership with Luxco to assume production of the Yellowstone brand. Luxco received half ownership of the Limestone Branch Distillery as part of the deal.

In April 2021, MGP Ingredients completed its acquisition of Luxco, making them the owners of the Yellowstone brand.
