= MGP Ingredients =

Food ingredients producer in the US

MGP Ingredients, Inc.
- Type: Public
- Traded as: Nasdaq: MGPI; S&P 600 component
- Industry: Drink industry, Cereal grain products
- Founded: 1941; 85 years ago
- Founder: Cloud L. Cray, Sr.
- Headquarters: Atchison, Kansas, U.S.
- Revenue: ▼US$536 million (2025)
- Net income: ▼ −US$108 million (2025)
- Subsidiaries: Luxco, MGPI Processing, Inc.
- Website: mgpingredients.com

MGP Ingredients, Inc. is an American branded and distilled spirits and food ingredients producer with headquarters in Atchison, Kansas.

MGP Ingredients' distilled spirits are sold under about 50 different brand names by various bottling companies, in addition to products sold under their own labels, including Till Vodka, George Remus Bourbon, and Rossville Union Straight Rye Whiskey.

== History ==
The company was founded by Cloud L. Cray Sr. in 1941 as "Midwest Grain Products, Inc.", and became a major neutral alcohol supplier during World War II. It operated an industrial alcohol distillery in Atchinson, Kansas.

In April 2021, MGP Ingredients completed its acquisition of Luxco, adding that company's portfolio of branded spirits.

In October 2026, MGP announced it would rebrand as Sempreon.

== Ross & Squibb Distillery ==
The Ross & Squibb Distillery was founded in 1847 and purchased by Seagram in 1933. While under their ownership, the distillery was called the Jos. E. Seagram Lawrenceburg Plant. When Seagram's assets were acquired by other companies, the Lawrenceburg distillery became the property of Pernod Ricard.

On April 19, 2006, Pernod Ricard announced plans to close the distillery, but instead sold it in 2007 to CL Financial, a holding company based in Trinidad and Tobago, which renamed it "Lawrenceburg Distillers Indiana" (LDI). CL Financial later collapsed and required government intervention, although the facility continued to operate through the crisis.

In October 2011, MGP Ingredients announced that it had reached an agreement with CL Financial to purchase the distillery. In 2012 Diageo was the distillery's biggest customer. The Ross & Squibb name was restored to the distillery in 2021.

== Products ==
MGP has eight whiskey brands of its own as of April 2021, including George Remus bourbon and Rossville Union rye, but primarily sells its output to various bottlers. One primary product of MGP Indiana sold to bottlers is a straight rye whiskey with a 95% rye mash bill, which is bottled under various brand names, including Angel's Envy, Bulleit Rye, Filibuster, George Dickel Rye, James E. Pepper, Smooth Ambler, and Templeton Rye. It also produces straight Bourbon whiskey, which is sold under various brand names, such as the Cougar Bourbon brand sold in Australia. These straight whiskeys are also used as the straight whiskey components in Seagram's Seven Crown, a blended whiskey now produced by Diageo, and High West. The distillery also produces neutral spirits used in the production of Seagram-branded gin and vodka, now owned by Pernod Ricard.

In April 2013, MGP announced the introduction of six additional mash bills for rye, malt, wheat and bourbon whiskey to expand the range of product offerings for the Indiana facility.

Altogether, MGP is the source of beverage spirits sold under about 50 different brand names, although these are often sold misleadingly by their bottlers as distinctive products with minimal disclosure of the actual source of the spirits. Some industry experts have commented negatively about the practice, such as the whiskey writer Charles Cowdery who has decried such bottlers as "Potemkin distilleries". As one example, in a class action settlement announced in 2015 about the marketing of the Templeton Rye brand which was actually produced using MGP spirits, Templeton was required to add the words "distilled in Indiana" to its label and remove claims of using a "Prohibition Era Recipe" and "small batch" production. The settlement also offered refunds to customers who had bought Templeton Rye since 2006.

Some brands modify the facility's products somewhat before bottling and selling them. George Dickel Rye, introduced in 2012, is mashed, distilled and aged in Indiana at MGP, and then trucked to the Diageo bottling plant in Plainfield, Illinois, for filtering and bottling. Angel's Envy finishes its spirits in old port wine casks before bottling.

MGP also produces plant-based protein. In 2021, MGP was ranked 31st on FoodTalks's Global Top Plant Protein Companies list. On September 9, 2026, MGP announced its first-ever namesake brand, debuting a limited-edition 10-year-old straight bourbon whiskey named MGP Chapter One: Out of the Shadows.

== Brands ==
MGP Ingredients beverage brands include:

- Bourbon whiskey: Daviess County, Ezra Brooks, George Remus, Old Ezra 101, Penelope, Rebel (wheated), Yellowstone
- Rye whiskey: Rossville Union, Minor Case
- Gin: Bowling & Burch, Green Hat
- Irish whiskey: The Quiet Man
- Irish cream: Saint Brendan
- Tequila: Dos Primos, El Mayor, Exotico
- Vodka: Pearl
