= Mr. Boston =

Former distillery in Boston, Massachusetts

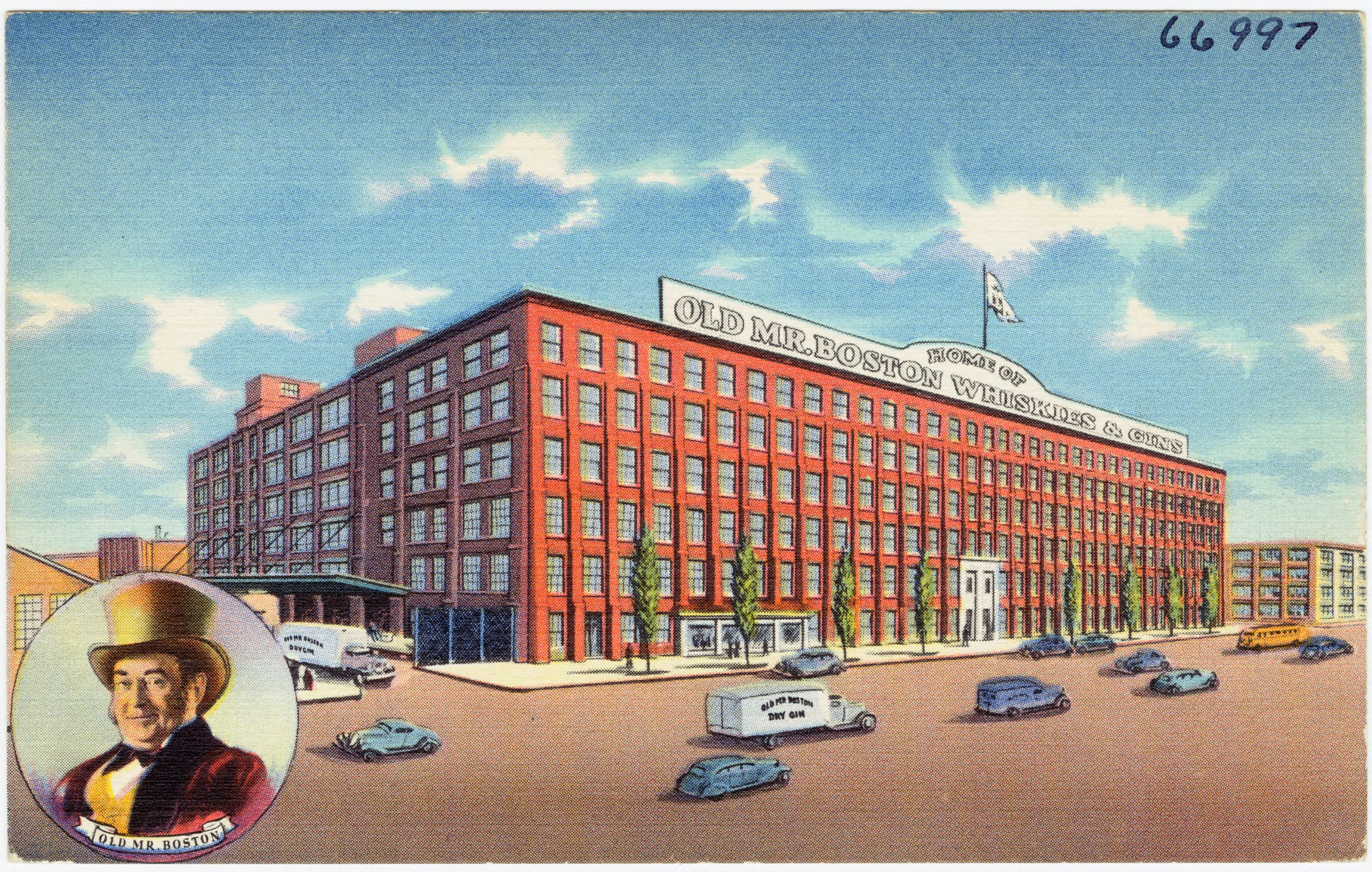
Postcard of distillery c. 1930s

Mr. Boston, previously Old Mr. Boston, was a distillery located at 1010 Massachusetts Avenue in Boston, Massachusetts, from 1933 to 1986. It produced its own label of gin, bourbon, rum, and brandies, as well as a few cordials and liqueurs.

== History ==
The distillery was founded in the Roxbury, Massachusetts, neighborhood of Boston in 1933 by Irwin "Red" Benjamin and Hyman C. Berkowitz. Old Mister Boston was known for its collectible bottles such as the 1953 Presidential Inaugural Bottle.

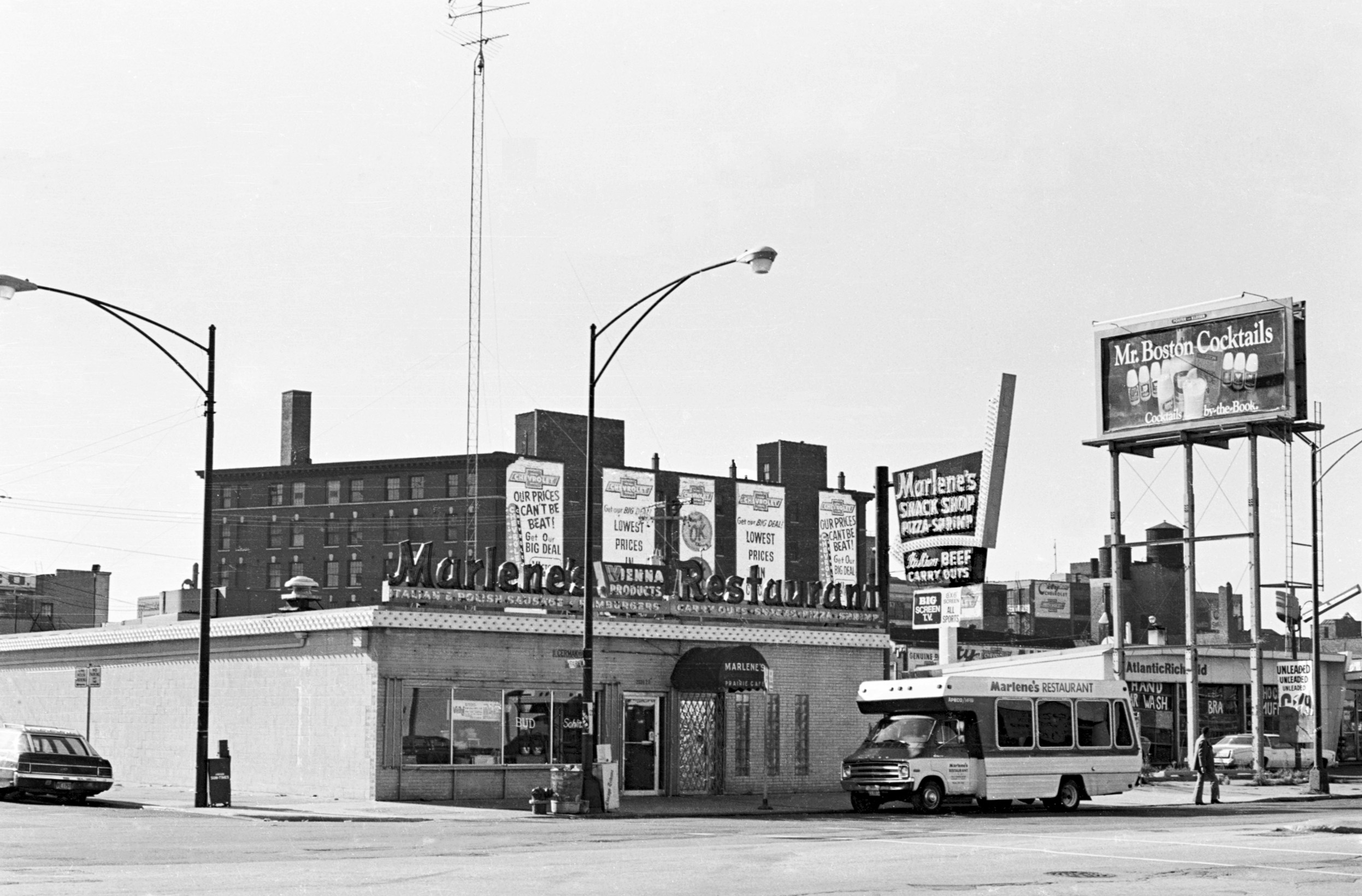
Billboard in Chicago, 1978

Over time, through a series of changes of ownership, the words "Old" and "Mr." were dropped from the name until it was known simply as "Boston". The distillery was a major employer in the Boston area from the 1930s until its closing circa 1986 when the parent company, Glenmore Distillers, shut down operations and the brand was withdrawn from the market. The building that housed Old Mr. Boston's operations is owned by the City of Boston and is in use as a City Inspectional Services headquarters as well as housing other city agencies such as the Boston Public Health Commission and the Department of Transitional Assistance.

== Famous "Bartender's Guide" ==
1935 first edition of Old Mr. Boston guide, showing trademark logo, the fictional "Mr. Boston". The book has been in print for more than 65 years.

The "Mr. Boston" name is known not only for its brands of distilled spirits, but also for its unique reference book, Mr. Boston Official Bartender's Guide, used by both professional and home bartenders as the "Bible of Booze". The Guide was first published 1935, according to the first date published in the Guide's publisher information page, the early days after the Repeal of Prohibition, when the distillery started up business again. As late as 2012 new editions were printed. In July 2016, Mr. Boston launched its new website, mrbostondrinks.com, where thirteen of the Official Bartender's Guides are available in digital form. It contains over 10,500 cocktail recipes.

== 1995 acquisition ==
The Barton Brands liquor unit of New York's Canandaigua Wine Co. (now Constellation Brands) acquired the brand name in 1995 and resumed production. Barton uses the brand for a line of liqueurs and cordials. In 2009 Constellation Spirits, including the Mr. Boston brand, was sold to the Sazerac Company of New Orleans, which has subsequently released light and dark rums imported from the U.S. Virgin Islands under the Mr. Boston name.

== 2009 acquisition ==
The Sazerac Company bought the Mr. Boston brand in 2009 and began putting many of the editions of the Bartender's Guide as the company could find on a website, which was at last count 58 out of the 75 guides published.

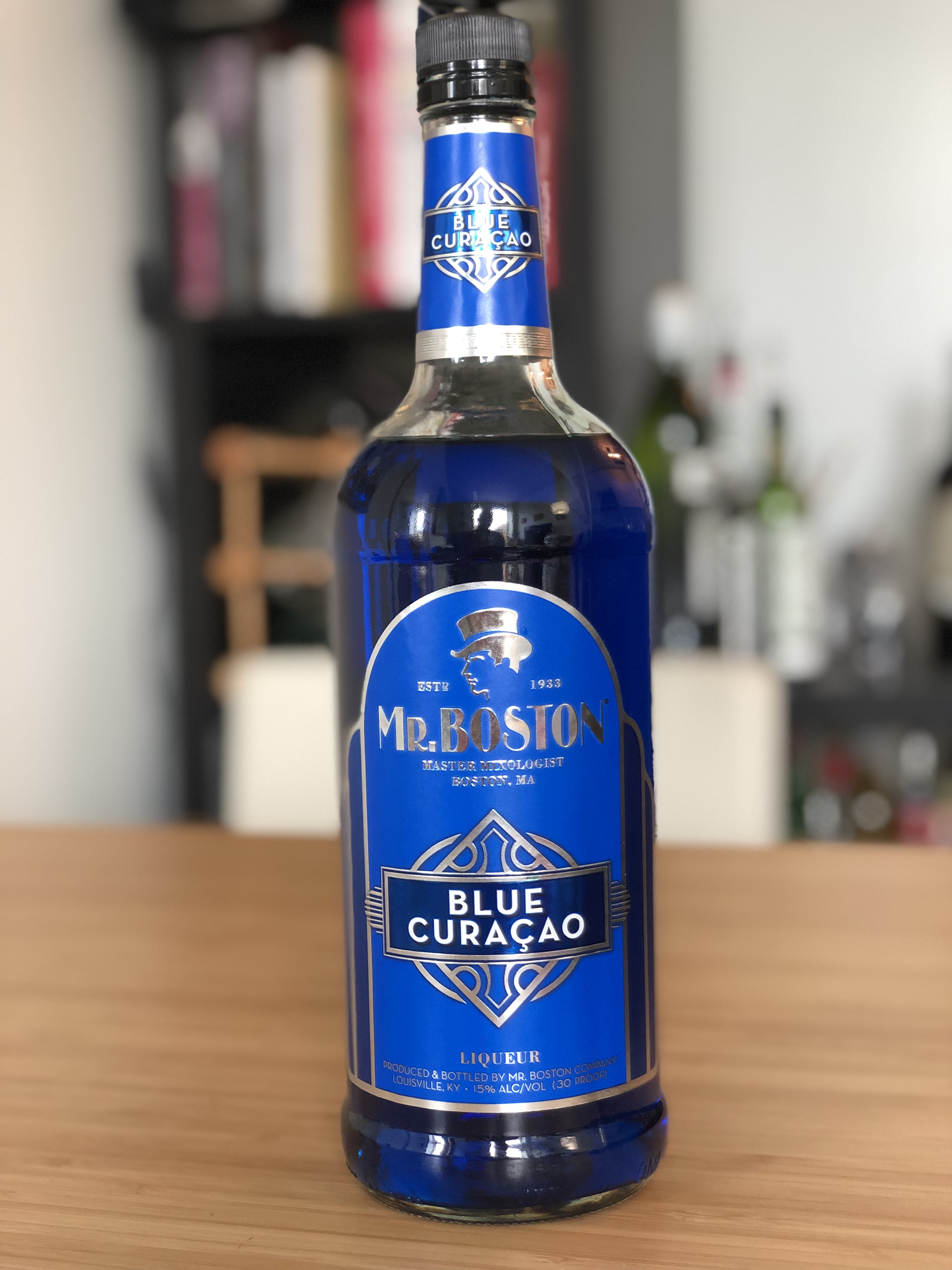
A Mr. Boston Liqueur, 2022.

In addition to the Bartender's Guides, the Mr. Boston Company currently produces 47 liqueurs, liquors, and ready-mixed cocktails.

== Famous Mr. Boston Brands ==
- Rock & Rye
- Mint & Gin
- 100 proof Vodka
