= Arrow (liqueur) =

Arrow is the brandname of a product line of alcoholic beverages, the most popular of which are flavored liqueurs (ranked 3rd best-selling in America.) Created in the early 20th century, the product line includes flavored schnapps, sweet and sour "Smakers" and brandies, and traditional cordials, liqueurs, and creams. The owner of the brand since 1999 is Luxco, a wine and spirit company based in St. Louis, Missouri.
