= Luxco =

American liquor producer

Luxco, Inc.
- Company type: Private
- Industry: Beverages
- Founded: 1958
- Headquarters: 5050 Kemper Ave., St. Louis, Missouri
- Key people: Donn Lux, CEO & Chairman; David Bratcher, President & COO; Steve Soucy, CFO; Dan Streepy, Chief Sales Officer; Steve Einig, Chief Marketing Officer
- Products: Wine; Spirits
- Parent: MGP Ingredients
- Website: www.luxco.com

Luxco, Inc. is an American privately owned producer and marketer of distilled beverages and liqueurs based in St. Louis, Missouri. It has been owned by MGP Ingredients since 2021.

== History ==
The company was founded in 1958 by David Sherman Sr. and Paul A. Lux, as the David Sherman Corporation. The company was renamed Luxco in 2006.

At the end of 2011, Luxco agreed to acquire all of the outstanding stock of Paramount Distillers Incorporated of Cleveland, Ohio and its Meier’s Wine Cellars subsidiary in Cincinnati, Ohio. In 2011, the Company had $220 million in sales and about 180 employees.

In 2018, the company opened its first whiskey distillery, Lux Row Distillery, in Bardstown, Kentucky. That year it also purchased half ownership of the Limestone Branch Distillery, which had revived the Yellowstone Bourbon brand.

In January 2021, MGP Ingredients announced a planned purchase of Luxco. In April, MGP completed its acquisition of Luxco.

== Brands ==
Some brands of Luxco are:

- Arrow liqueurs
- Caffé Lolita liqueur
- Lady Bligh spiced rum
- El Mayor tequila
- Everclear
- Juarez tequila
- Purple Passion
- Saint Brendan's Irish Cream Liqueur
- Salvador's cocktails
- Yago Sant'gria, a sangria.
- Vodkas:
  - Pearl vodka, a five times distilled vodka which comes in a variety of flavors
  - Tvarscki
- Whiskey:
  - Ezra Brooks (and Old Ezra 101)
  - Rebel
  - Blood Oath
  - Yellowstone Bourbon

Luxco formerly owned the Admiral Nelson Spiced Rum brand, but it was sold in late 2011.

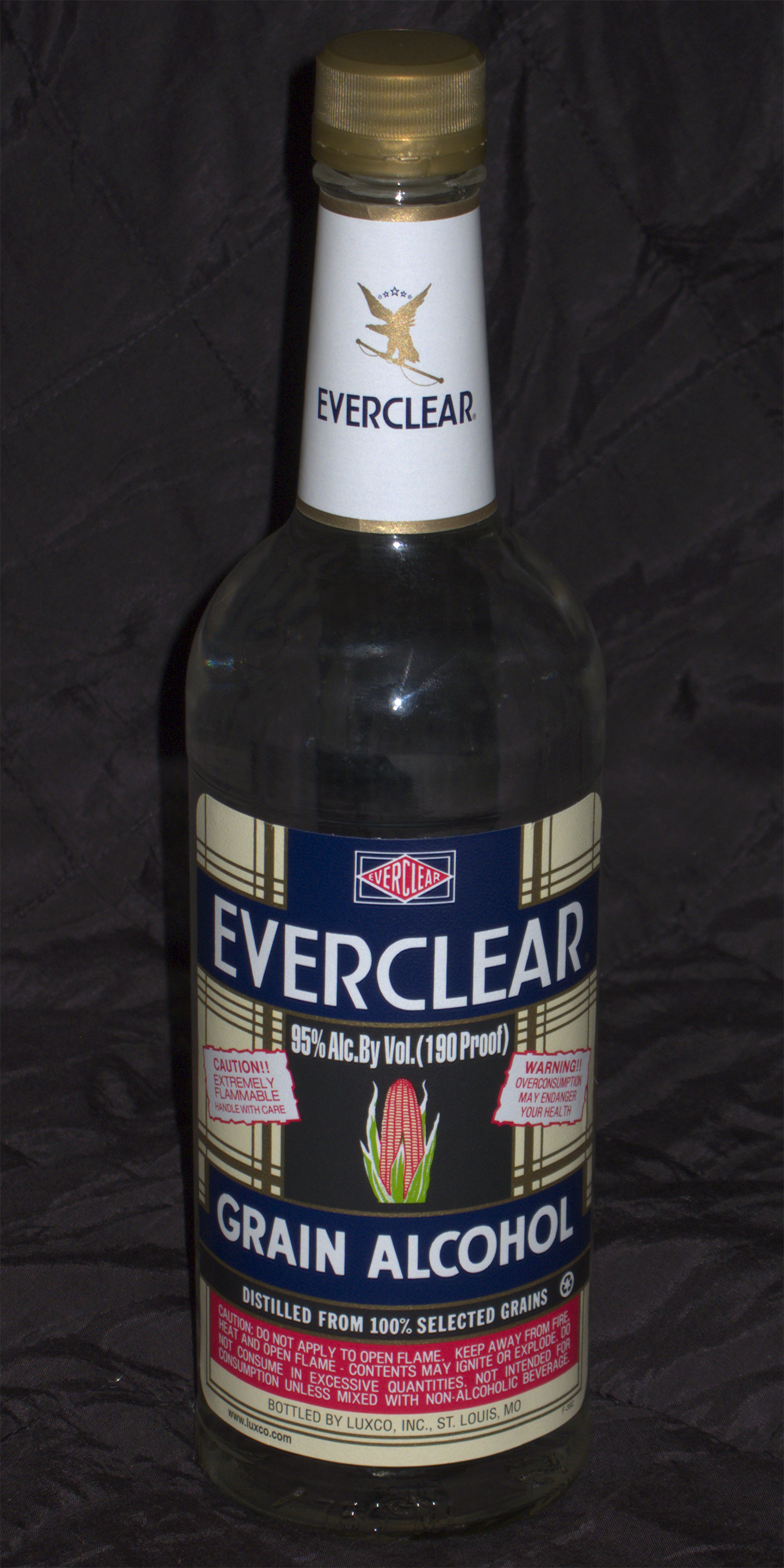
Everclear

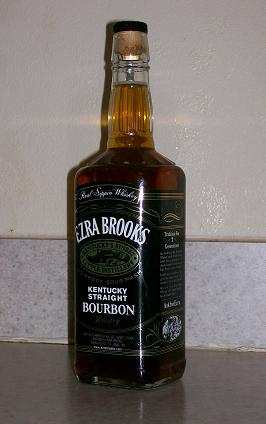
Ezra Brooks Kentucky Bourbon Whiskey

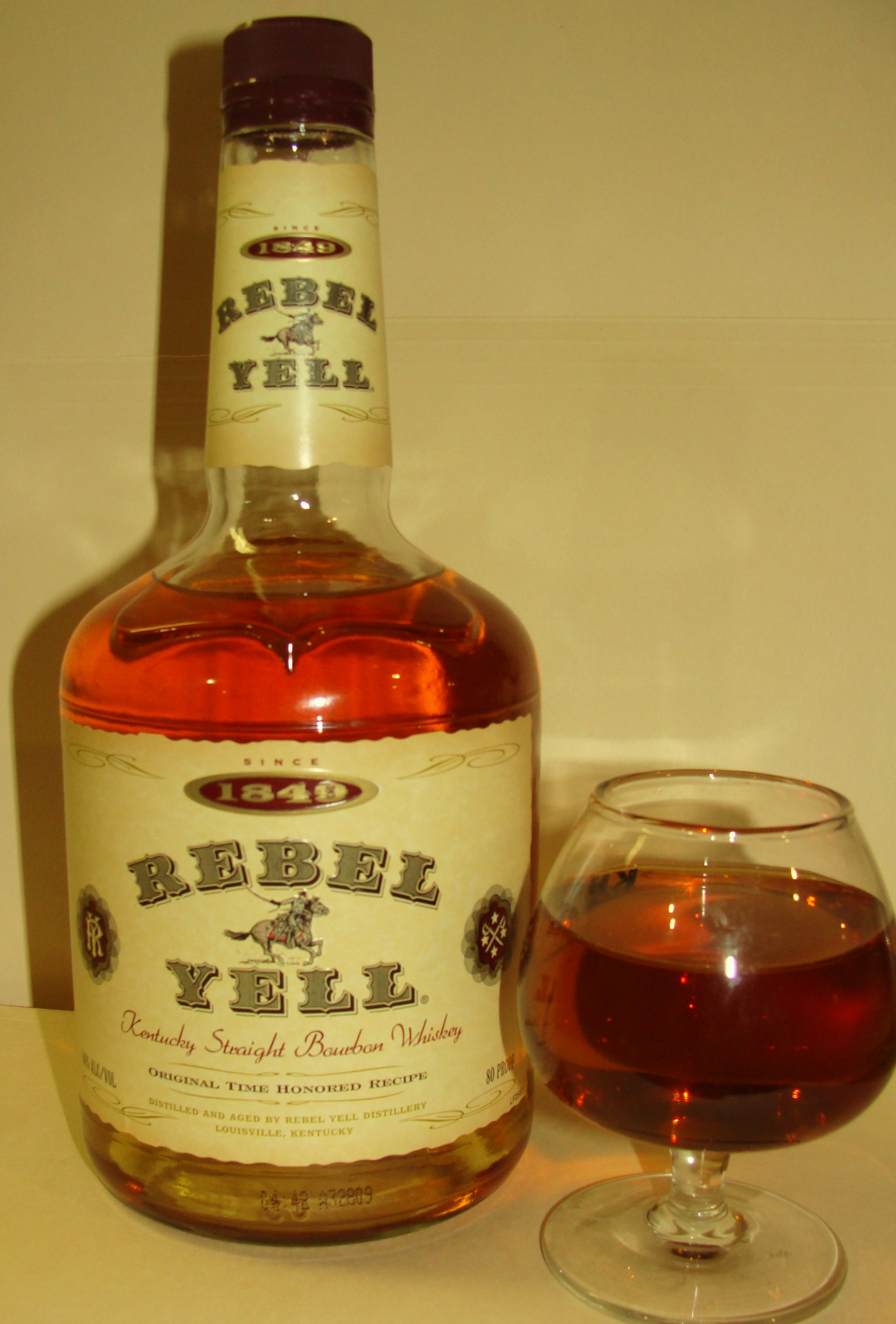
Rebel Yell Whiskey
