= Glenmore Distillery Company =

Whiskey distillery in Owensboro, Kentucky, U.S.

Coordinates: 37°46′44″N 87°05′14″W

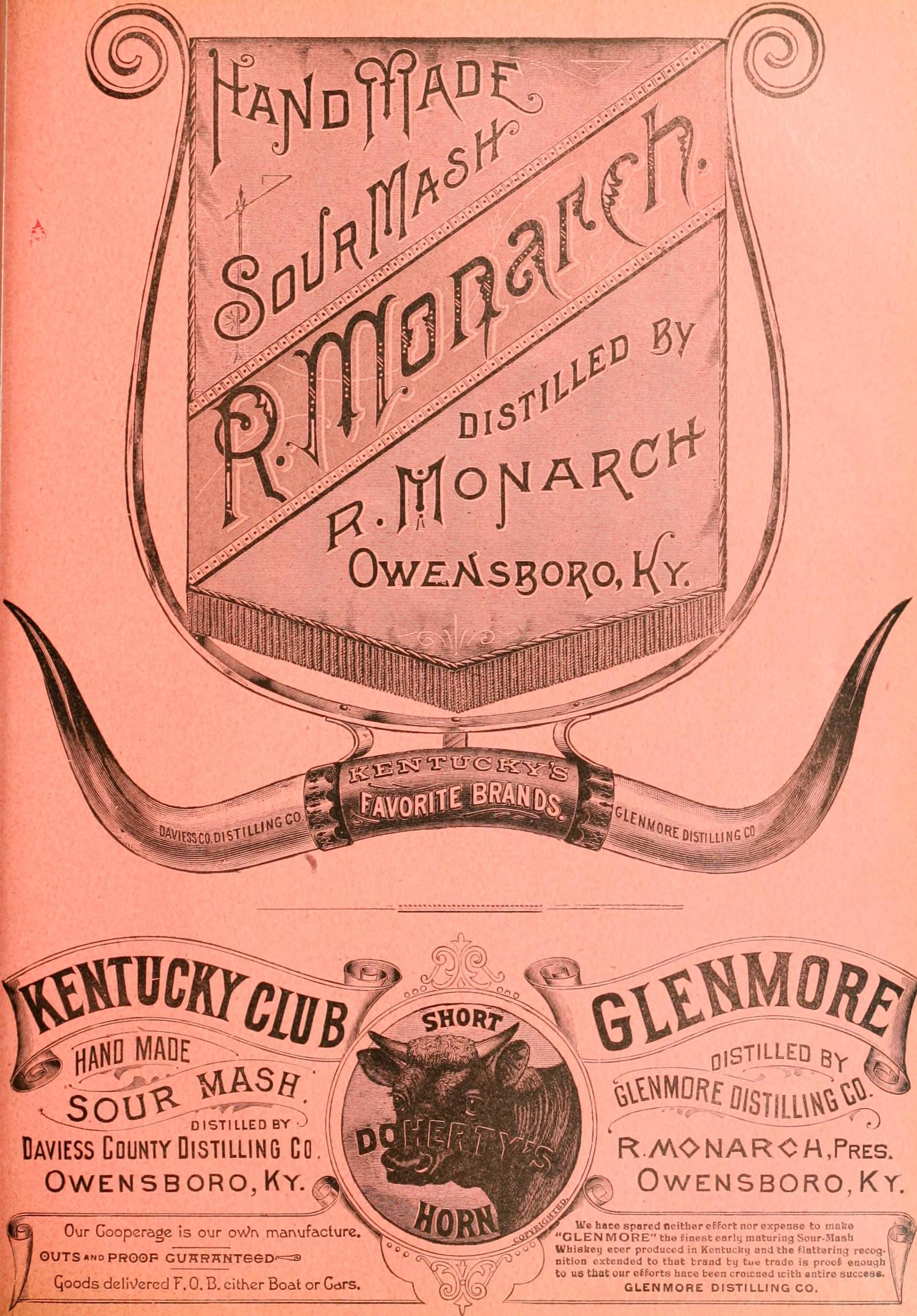
R. Monarch Distillery Owensboro, Kentucky, Glenmore Distilling, Daviess County Distilling 1892 ad

Glenmore Distillery Company was a large distillery company based in Owensboro, Kentucky best known as a producer of bourbon whiskey. In 2009, the company was acquired by the Sazerac Company, and is still operated under the name "The Glenmore Distillery".

== History ==
Glenmore Distillery was founded as the R. Monarch Distillery in 1849. The company entered bankruptcy proceedings in 1898. Monarch had long been producing brands that included Kentucky Tavern and Glenmore at their plant in Owensboro. In 1901 the company was acquired by James Thompson and his brother Francis P. Thompson for $30,000 and renamed the Glenmore Distillery Company.

In 1903, the Kentucky Tavern trademark was first registered. In 1904, the Old Thompson brand was introduced under the guidance of the Thompson brothers.

When James Thompson died in 1924, his sons, Col. Frank B. and James P. Thompson, assumed leadership, with Frank becoming chairman and president. The Thompsons maintained the Glenmore as a concentration warehouse, bottling and distributing medicinal whiskey during Prohibition.

Glenmore proved a successful and durable company, its main brand being Kentucky Tavern. In 1944 the firm purchased the Yellowstone Bourbon brand from the Taylor & Williams Distillery of Louisville. Glenmore followed the lead of other large firms and marketed imported whiskies and cordials through its subsidiaries, Mr. Boston, Foreign Vintages and Viking Distillery.

In 1955 Glenmore barreled its two-millionth barrel of bourbon and introduced Glenmore-branded vodka. Glenmore introduced Glenmore Gin in 1959 and also became the first distillery to break the self-imposed ban on using women to sell distilled spirits.

The Thompson family maintained control of the company until 1991, at which time it was acquired by Guinness, which merged it with Schenley Industries and named the new entity United Distillers, which sold it in 1995 to Barton Brands. In March 2009, the Sazerac Company of New Orleans purchased the Barton distillery and many other brands owned by Constellation Brands as part of a $334 million transaction. Sazerac maintains the Glenmore distillery as a bottling plant. A corporate art collection holds many corporate purchase works including a painting by Dennis J Shaffner entitled 'Bernheim Carp' 1983.
