= Barton Brands =

Distilled spirits and liquors brand

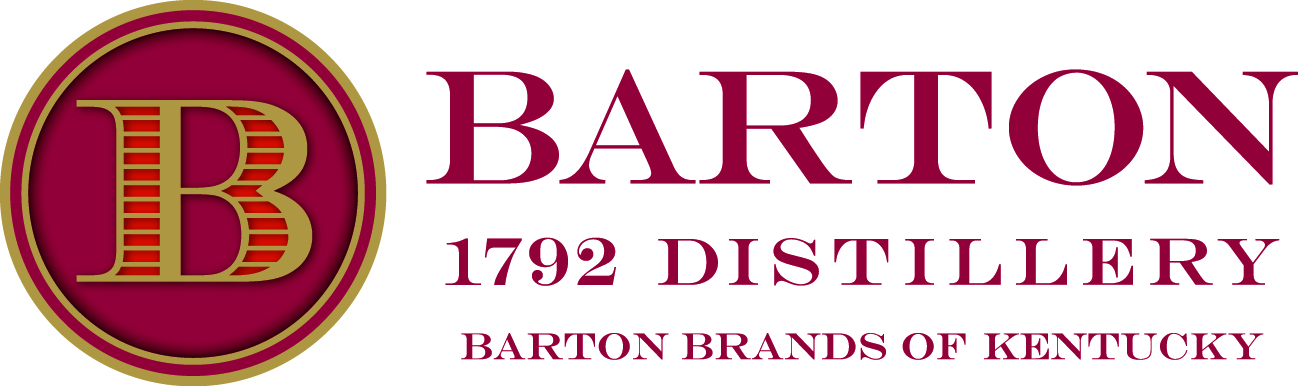
Barton Brands of Kentucky logo

Barton Brands, Ltd. was a company that produced a variety of distilled beverages and liqueurs and is now part of the Sazerac Company, which is headquartered in New Orleans, Louisiana, and has its principal offices in Louisville, Kentucky. The Barton distillery, currently known as the Barton 1792 distillery, was originally established in 1879, and is located in Bardstown, Kentucky.

Some of Barton's better-known brands and products have included the 1792 Bourbon, Kentucky Tavern, and Very Old Barton bourbons; Fleischmann's, Skol and Wave Vodkas; the 99 line of schnapps (99 Apples, 99 Bananas, etc.); Calypso and Barton rums; Capitan, El Toro and Montezuma tequilas and Mr. Boston and Fleischmann's gins.

In 1993, Barton was acquired by Canandaigua Wine Company, later Constellation Brands. In 2009, Constellation sold Barton to the Sazerac Company.

== List of products ==
=== Bourbons ===
- 1792 Bourbon (formerly called Ridgewood Reserve 1792 and 1792 Ridgemont Reserve)
- Thomas S. Moore Extended Cask Finish
- Very Old Barton
- Tom Moore
- Kentucky Gentleman
- Kentucky Tavern
- Colonel Lee
- Wolcott
- Kirkland Signature Bottled In Bond
- Member's Mark
- Zackariah Harris
- Flatboat

=== Blended American whiskey ===
- Barton
- Fleischmann's
- Imperial
- Old Thompson
- Ten High

=== Canadian whisky ===
- Barton's Canadian
- Canadian Host
- Canadian LTD
- Canadian Supreme
- Mr. Boston Five Star Canadian
- Northern Light Canadian

=== Scotch whisky ===
- Highland Mist
- House of Stuart
- Inver House
- Lauder's
- Vittoria Clan

=== Whisky liqueur ===
- Fireball Cinnamon Whisky

=== Gin ===
- Barton
- Crystal Palace
- Czarina
- Fleischmann's
- Glenmore
- Mr. Boston
- Mr. Boston Riva
- Pikeman
- Skol

=== Mezcal ===
- Monte Alban

=== Rum ===
- Barton
- Calypso
- Fleischmann's
- Mr. Boston
- Skol

=== Schnapps ===
- 99 Schnapps (various flavor variations – apple, banana, black cherry, etc.)
- Barton Peach
- Mr. Boston

=== Tequila and triple sec ===
- Capitan
- El Toro
- Montezuma
- Barton Tequila & Triple Sec
- Chi-Chi's Tequila & Triple Sec

=== Vodka ===
- Fleischmann's Vodka
- Barton
- Crystal Palace
- Coulson's
- Czarina
- Glenmore
- Mr. Boston
- Skol
- Wave Flavors

== The Barton 1792 Distillery ==
The distillery currently known as the Barton 1792 distillery was originally established in 1879. As of June 2018, it comprises 51 buildings – most of which are rickhouses for barrel aging.

== Rickhouse collapse in 2018 ==
In June and July 2018 one of the 29 rickhouses at the Barton 1792 Distillery collapsed in two stages. The rickhouse had a storage capacity of about 20,000 barrels, and contained about 18,000 when the first collapse occurred, with each barrel having a capacity of 53 US gallons (200 L). On June 22, 2018, about half of the building collapsed and caused about 9,000 barrels of spirits being aged there to fall with the structure, although about two-thirds of the barrels remained intact. The facility had a 12-foot (3.7 m) deep basement to help contain spills, but some bourbon and brandy leaked into the nearby Withrow Creek and Beech Fork River, and about 800–1000 fish were killed. The building had been constructed in the 1940s, and one of the walls had been in the process of being repaired when the collapse occurred. Sazerac was given a notice of state law violation for the spill and for failure to properly notify the authorities. About two weeks later, on July 4, 2018, the remainder of the building collapsed. No one was injured in either collapse.

== See also ==
- List of historic whiskey distilleries
