= Charring =

Chemical process

Charring is a chemical process of incomplete combustion of certain solids when subjected to high heat. Heat distillation removes water vapour and volatile organic compounds (syngas) from the matrix. The residual black carbon material is char, as distinguished from the lighter colored ash. By the action of heat, charring removes hydrogen and oxygen from the solid, so that the remaining char is composed primarily of carbon. Most solid organic compounds, like wood or biological tissue, and thermoset polymers exhibit charring behaviour. In non-scientific terms, charring means partially burning so as to blacken the surface.

Charring can result from naturally occurring processes like fire; it is also a deliberate and controlled reaction used in the manufacturing of certain products. The mechanism of charring is part of the normal burning of certain solid fuels like wood. During normal combustion, the volatile compounds created by charring are consumed at the flames within the fire or released to the atmosphere, while combustion of char can be seen as glowing red coals or embers which burn without the presence of flames.

== Production of char ==
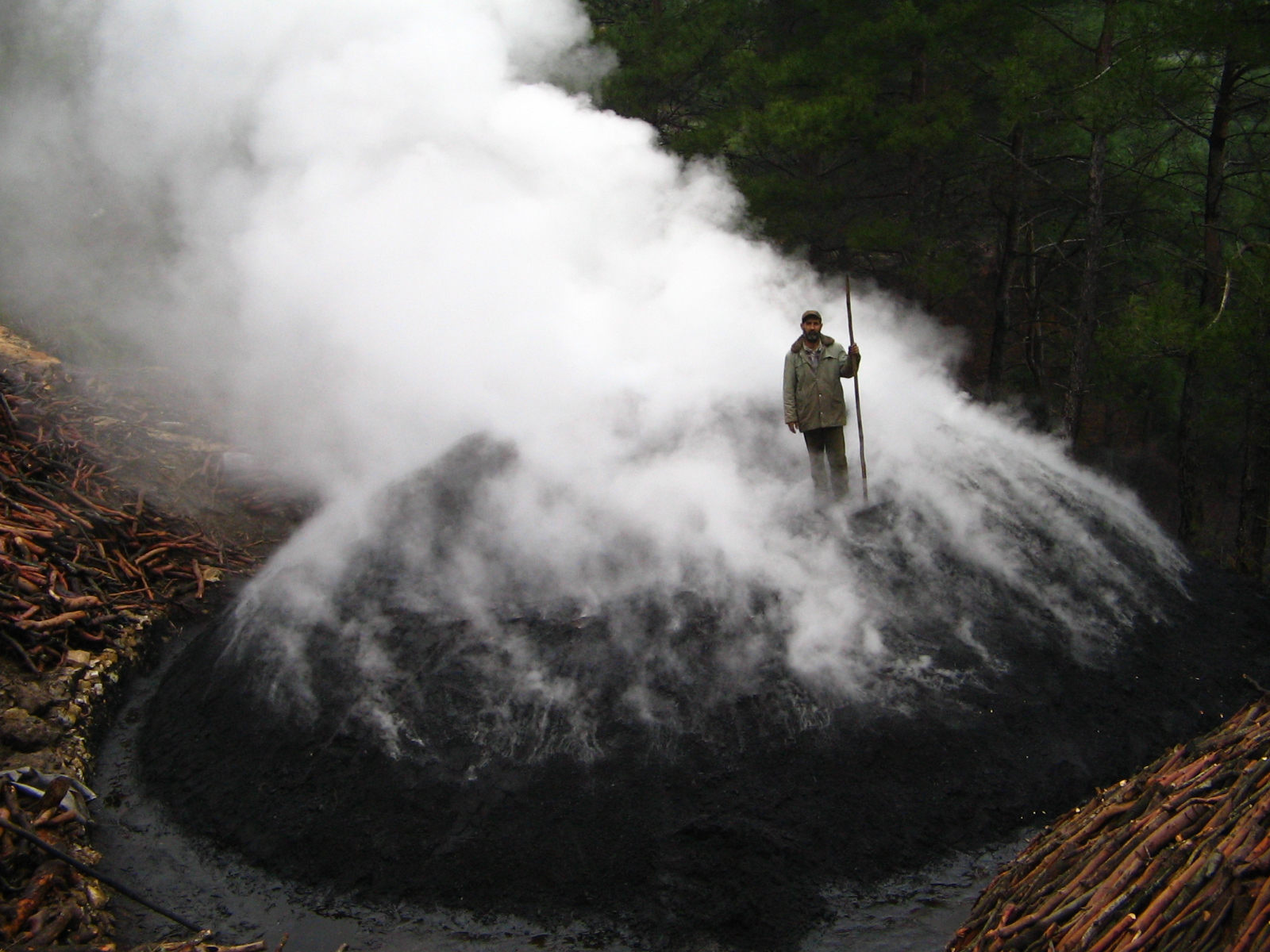
A charcoal burner tending his charcoal clamp, in which he is producing charcoal. The process takes days, and the clamp has to be monitored to stop the fire from breaking out (technically, the oxygen from breaking in).

Coke and charcoal are both produced by charring, whether on an industrial scale or through normal combustion of coal or wood. Normal combustion consumes the char as well as the gases produced in its creation, while industrial processes seek to recover the purified char with minimal loss to combustion. This is accomplished by either burning the parent fuel (wood or coal) in a low-oxygen environment or by heating it to a high temperature without allowing combustion to occur. In industrial production of coke and charcoal, the volatile compounds driven off during charring are often captured for use in other chemical processes.

A "coal burning" blacksmith's forge actually produces the heat necessary for high-temperature metalworking by the continuous production and consumption of coke within a carefully managed fire. An inner ring of burning coke provides heat which converts the encircling coal into coke, which is then itself fed into the center of the fire to provide the required heat and to create more coke; coal itself is incapable of producing the heat required for some blacksmithing operations.

== Charring and fire protection ==
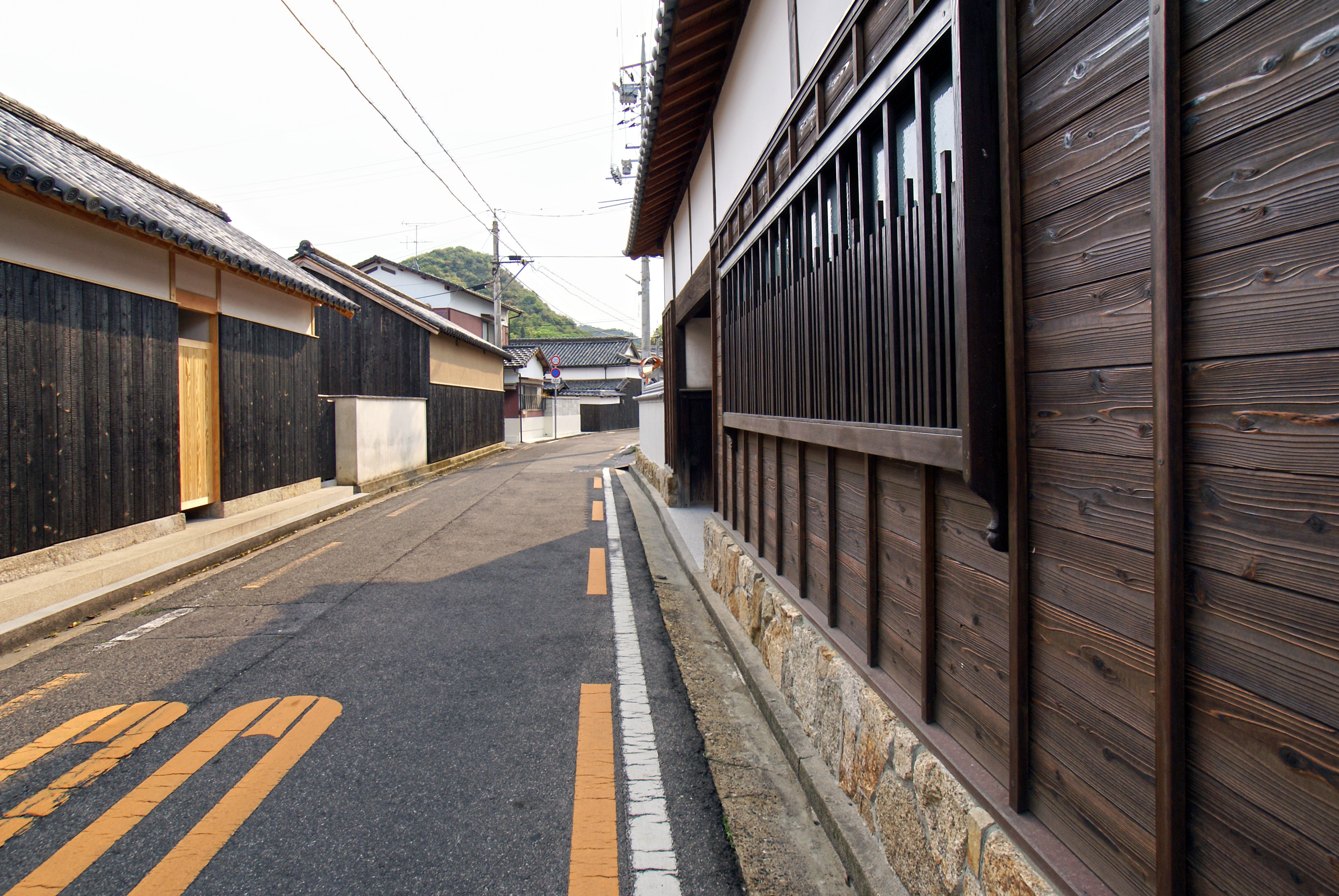
Traditional houses in Naoshima, Kagawa clad with yakisugi panels

Charring is an important process in the combustion ignition of solid fuels and in smouldering. In construction of heavy-timbered wood buildings the predictable formation of char is used to determine the fire rating of supporting timbers and is an important consideration in fire protection engineering. If a wood column is of large enough diameter, during a structure fire its exposed surface will be converted to char until the thickness of char provides sufficient insulation to prevent additional charring. This layer then serves to protect the remaining structurally sound core of wood, which can continue to carry the building loads if appropriately designed.

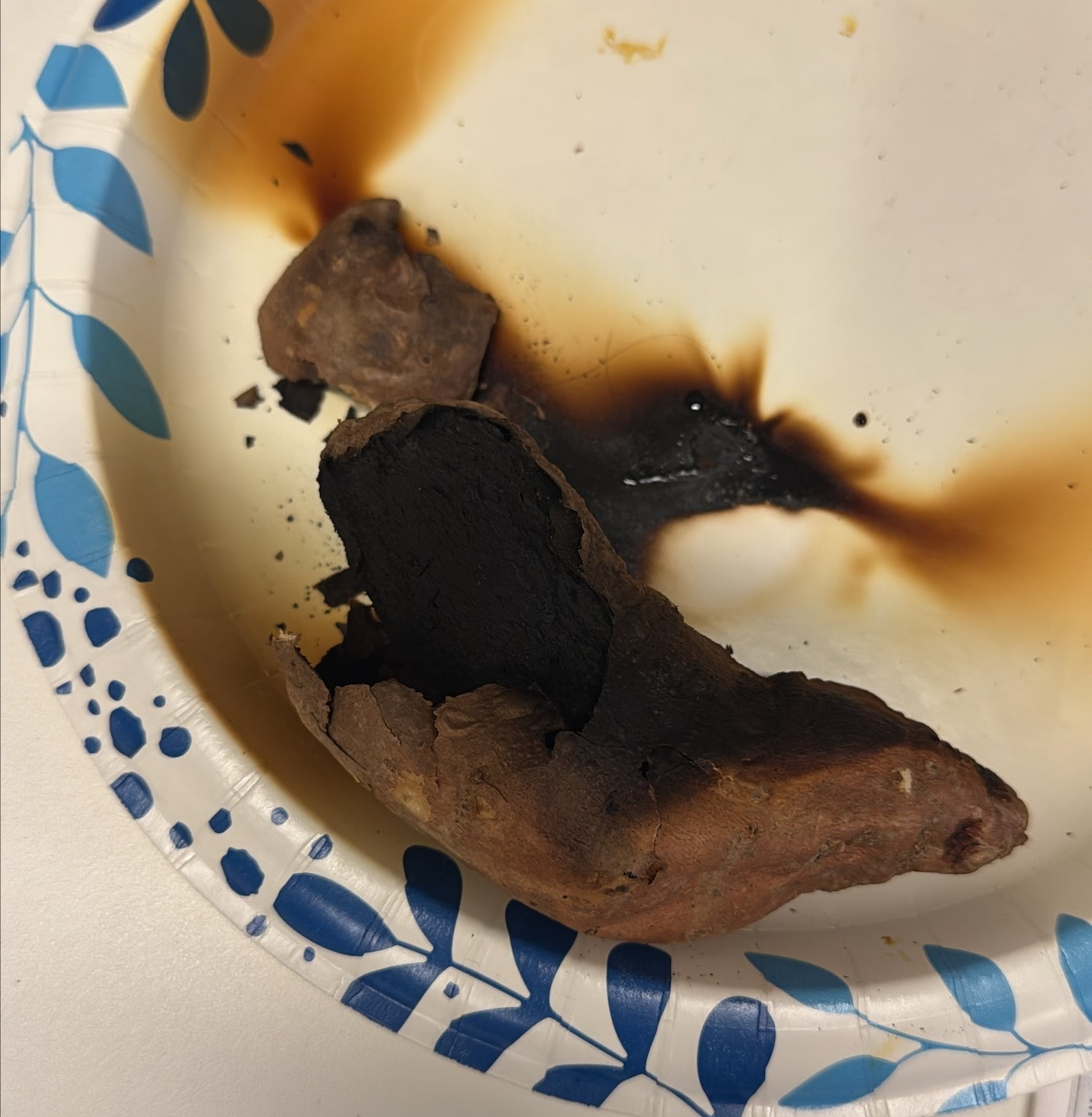
Example of charred remains of a sweet potato from a microwave oven leaving carbonized char

== Wood preservation ==
Charring is also a technique used for wood preservation. In Japan this traditional technique is called yakisugi or shō sugi ban.

== Legal definitions ==
Charring had a special meaning under the common law of England. Under that system, the crime of arson required charring of a dwelling—actual damage to the fiber of the material from which the structure was built—and not mere "scorching" or damage to the surface or surface coverings such as carpets and wallpaper.

== See also ==
- Gasification
- Pyrolysis
