= Straight whiskey =

Type of whiskey

Straight whiskey (or straight whisky), as defined in United States law, is whiskey that is distilled from a fermented (malted or unmalted) cereal grain mash to a concentration not exceeding 80% alcohol by volume (abv) and aged in new charred oak barrels for at least two years at a concentration not exceeding 62.5% at the start of the aging process. Domestic sales of straight whiskey surpassed 27 million 9-liter cases in 2021.

The only allowed modifications to straight whiskey prior to its bottling consist of batching whiskey from different barrels (and sometimes from different distilleries, although only from within the same state), chill filtering the whiskey, and adding water to reduce proof while retaining at least a 40% abv concentration. This definition is established for production of American whiskey for consumption within the United States as per the U.S federal Standards of Identity for Distilled Spirits. The regulations do not necessarily apply to American whiskey made for export.

Alternatively, straight can be regarded as a synonym for ordering or serving whiskey neat, without any water, ice, mixers, or other liquors.

== Aging and labeling requirements ==
A straight whiskey must spend at least two years stored in charred new oak barrels, except corn whiskey, which must use uncharred or used oak barrels. The spirit penetrates the wood, extracting many flavor compounds and caramelized wood sugars, and oxidizing during this aging.

A straight whiskey that has been aged less than four years is required to be labeled with an age statement describing the actual age of the product.

Other than an age statement, which lists the age of the youngest spirit in a bottle, the only other special labeling dealing with the age of a straight whiskey in the U.S. is bottled in bond. All bonded whiskeys are required to be straight whiskeys, and are additionally required to be aged for at least four years. Bonded whiskeys must also fulfill several other requirements.

== Ingredients ==
When at least 51% of the content of the mash used in the production of a straight whiskey consists of corn, rye, barley, or wheat, the designation can be coupled with a special name associated with the type of grain and whether the grain was malted. For example, a straight whiskey may be a bourbon whiskey (using a mash of corn), malt whiskey (using a mash of malted barley), rye whiskey, rye malt whiskey, or wheat whiskey. An especially prominent variation is the labeling "Kentucky Straight Bourbon Whiskey", used to indicate a straight whiskey made in Kentucky from a mash of at least 51% corn. For a straight whiskey to be called corn whiskey, it must use a mash with at least 80% corn and be aged in used or uncharred barrels.

Extra ingredients, such as caramel coloring, are forbidden in straight whiskey. In contrast, even the regulations governing single malt whiskey production in some countries allow the addition of caramel coloring to enhance appearance.

== ABV limit ==
The limit of 80% maximum abv concentration for the distillation is a key element of the definition of straight whiskey. At alcohol concentrations exceeding this amount, most of the flavor from the original fermented mash that was used in the distillation process will be removed, resulting in a more neutral grain spirit.

In other countries, whiskey may be produced from a spirit that is much higher in alcoholic proof, which generally reduces the flavor derived from the original mash that was used in its production.

== Relationship to blended whiskey ==
Straight whiskey is a distinctly different product from blended whiskey. Most premium-category brands of American whiskey are straight whiskey, while the economy category is primarily blended whiskey.

However, straight whiskey is also an important component of American blended whiskey. Blended whiskey made in the United States must contain at least 20% straight whiskey. The remaining portion is higher-proof spirit, often unaged neutral grain spirits, which are less expensive to produce. The straight whiskey component adds characteristic whiskey flavor to the blend, as the higher proof spirit loses most flavoring compounds during the distillation process, and does not gain flavors from barrel aging. Blended whiskey may also contain additives for coloring and flavoring.

Canadian whiskey, which is typically a blend, also uses straight-whiskey-style spirits as a major flavor component, though Canada does require at least three years of aging (usually in used barrels) to qualify any product as Canadian whiskey.

== See also ==
- Outline of whisky
