= Mint julep =

Cocktail of bourbon, sugar and fresh mint

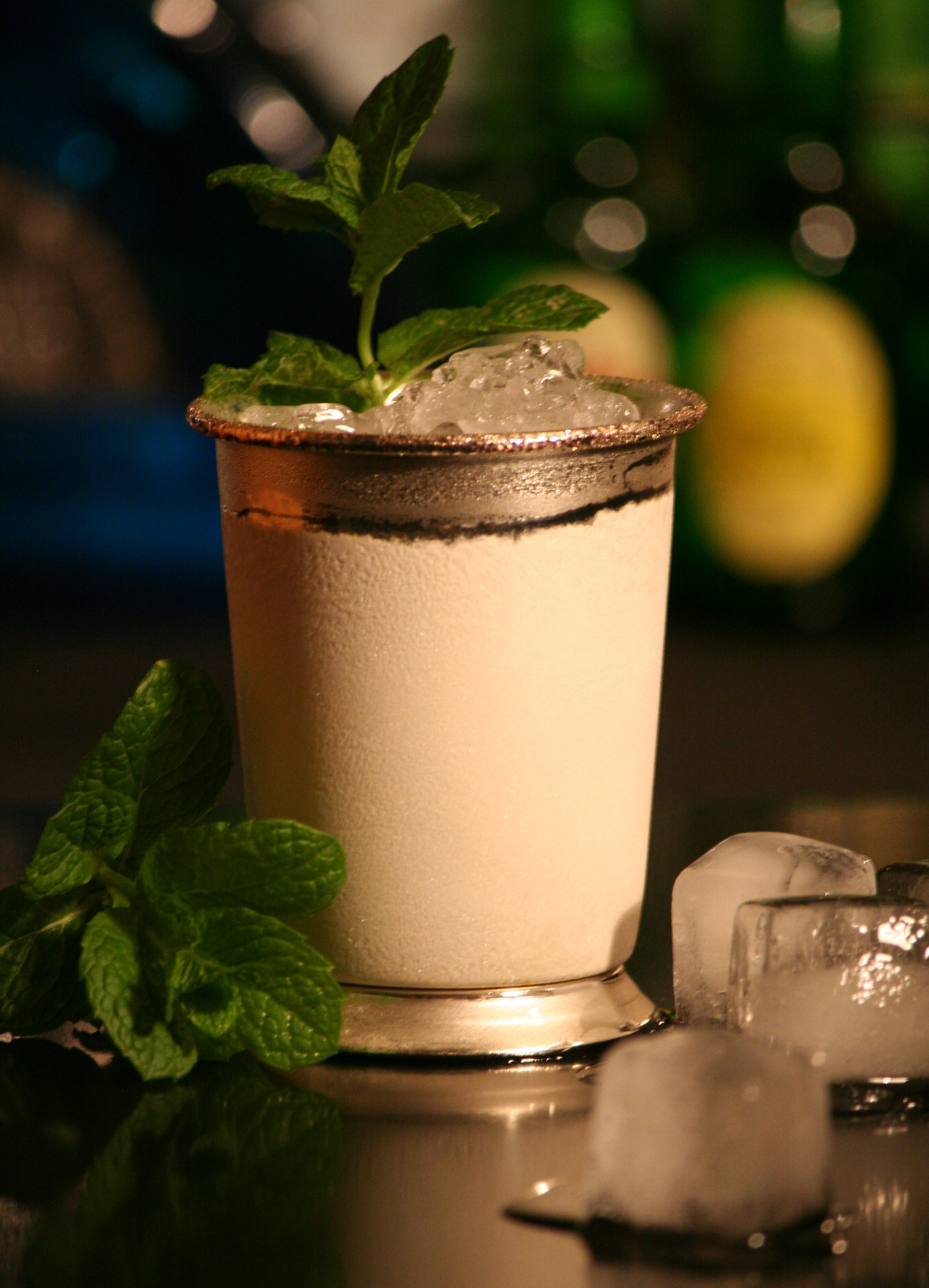
- A mint julep served in the traditional silver cup
- Type: Cocktail
- Ingredients: 60 mL (2.0 US fl oz) bourbon whiskey; 4 mint sprigs; 1 tsp (5 mL) powdered sugar; 2 tsp (10 mL) water
- Base spirit: Bourbon whiskey
- Standard drinkware: Julep stainless steel cup
- Standard garnish: Mint sprig
- Served: On the rocks: poured over ice
- Preparation: In Julep Stainless Steel Cup gently muddle the mint with sugar and water. Fill the glass with cracked ice, add the Bourbon and stir well until the cup frosts.

Mint julep is an alcoholic cocktail, consisting primarily of bourbon, sugar, water, crushed or shaved ice, and fresh mint. As a bourbon-based cocktail, it is associated with the American South and the cuisine of the Southern United States in general, in particular as a symbol of the Kentucky Derby.

== Preparation ==
A mint julep is traditionally made with four ingredients: mint leaf, bourbon, simple syrup, and crushed ice. Traditionally, spearmint is the mint of choice used in Southern states, and in Kentucky in particular. Proper preparation of the cocktail is commonly debated, as methods may vary considerably from one bartender to another. The mint julep may be considered a member of a loosely associated family of drinks called "smashes" (the brandy smash is another example, as well as the mojito), in which fresh mint and other ingredients are muddled or crushed in preparation for flavoring the finished drink. The step further releases essential oils and juices into the mixture, intensifying the flavor from the added ingredient or ingredients.

Traditionally, mint juleps are served in silver or pewter cups, and held only by the bottom and top edges of the cup. This allows frost to form on the outside of the cup. Traditional hand placement may have arisen as a way to reduce the heat transferred from the hand to the silver or pewter cup. Today, mint juleps are most commonly served in a tall old-fashioned glass, Collins glass, or highball glass with a straw.

== History ==
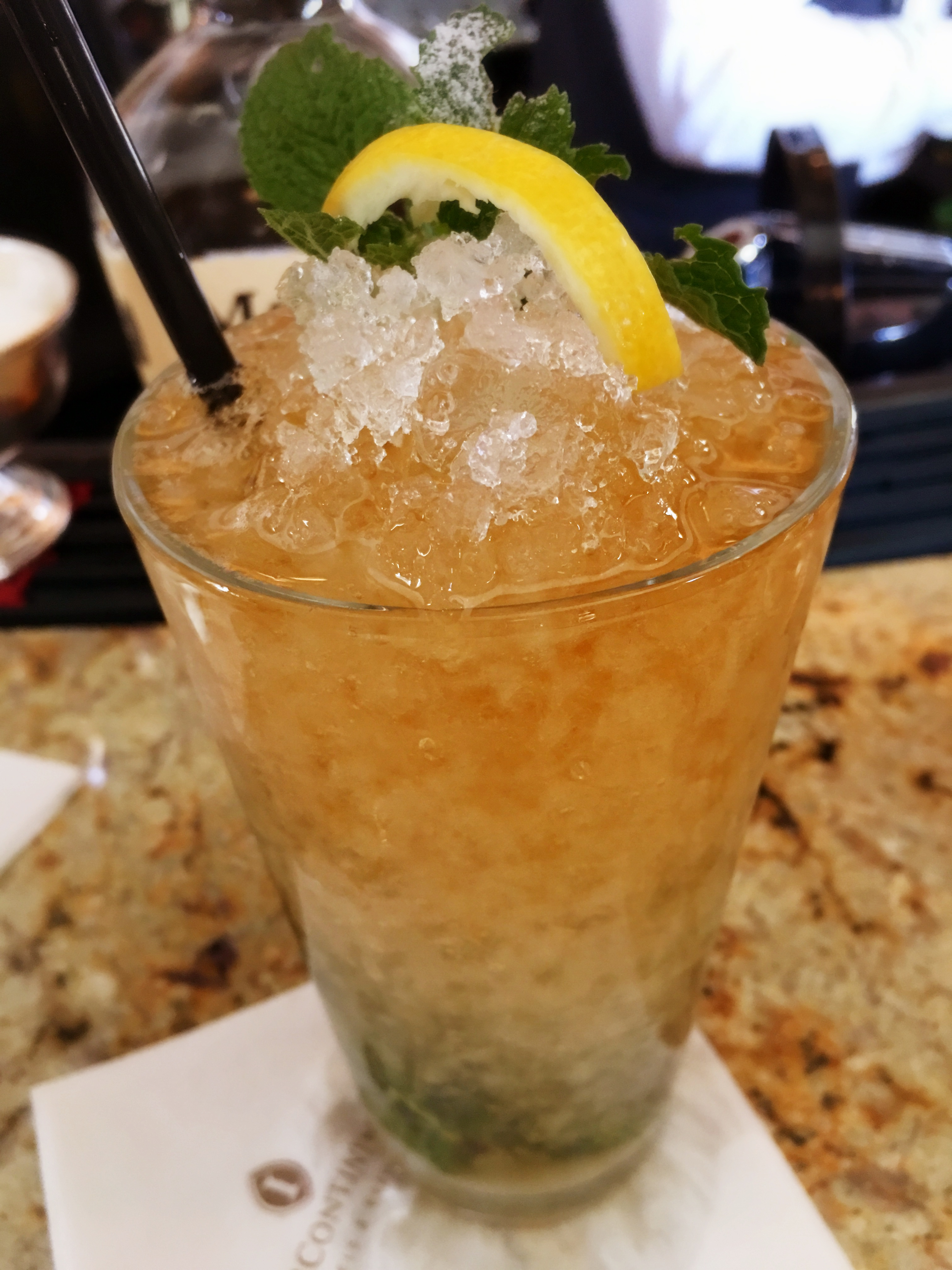
A mint julep made with Henry Clay's original recipe at the Round Robin Bar. According to bartender and historian Jim Hewes, the cocktail was originally served in a crystal glass because it represented a more upper-class beverage.

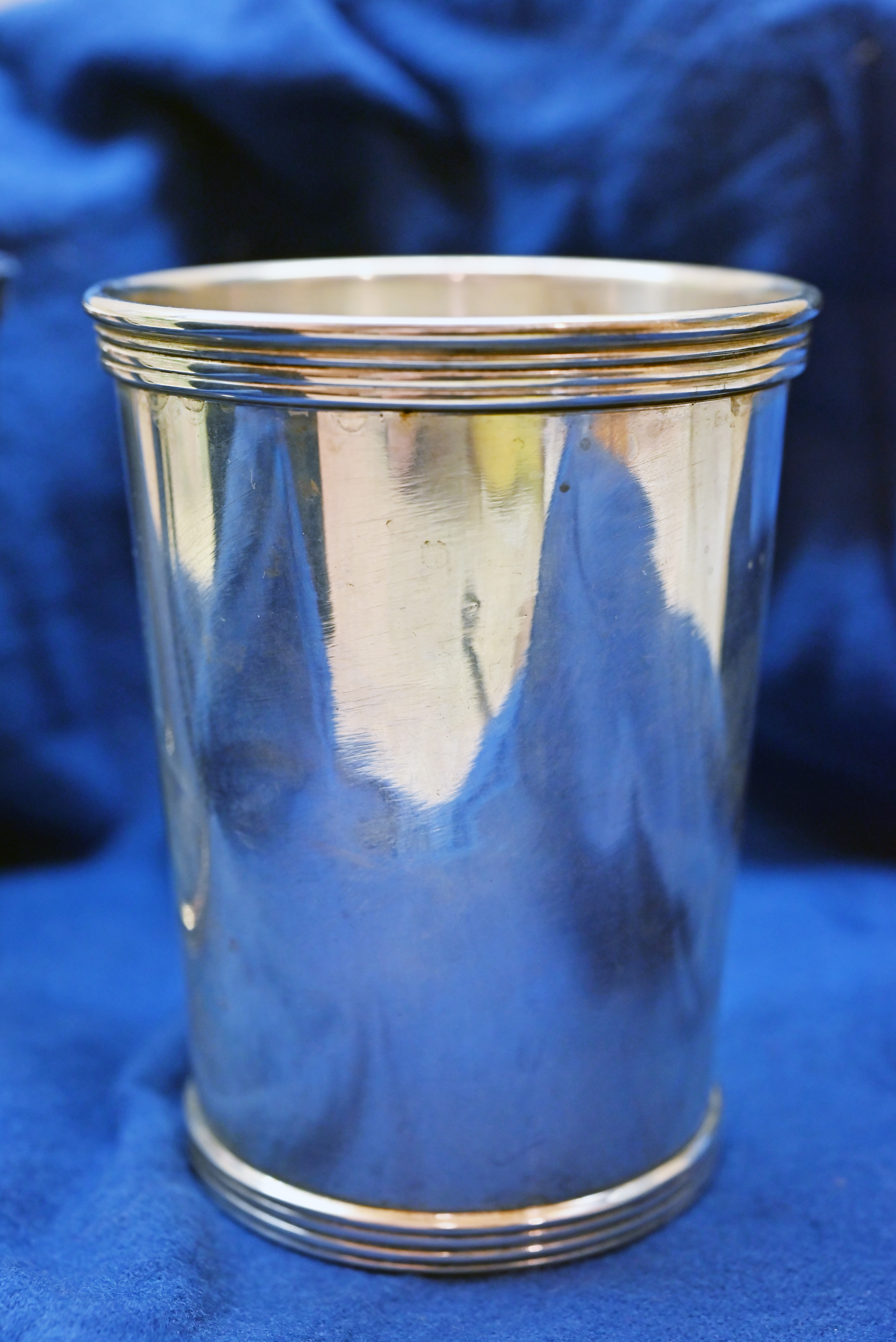
A silver mint julep cup

The term "julep" is generally defined as a sweet drink, particularly one used as a vehicle for medicine. The word itself is derived from the Spanish "julepe", from Spanish Arabic, and this from the Persian word گلاب (Golâb), meaning rosewater. English juleps, as opposed to later American mint juleps, were primarily medicinal, lightly alcoholic, and often contained camphor.

The mint julep originated in the Southern United States, probably during the eighteenth century. The earliest known mentions come from 1770 and include a satirical play by Robert Munford, The Candidate (where a drunkard character “Mr. Julip” appears); and "A Short Poem on Hunting" (which describes julep as a concoction "Which doctors storm at, and which some adore"), published in the Williamsburg Virginia Gazette. Further evidence of mint julep as a prescription drink can be found in 1784 Medical communications: "sickness at the stomach, with frequent retching, and, at times, difficulty of swallowing. I then prescribed her an emetic, some opening powders, and a mint julep."

In 1793, Rev. Harry Toulmin described mint julep as “a tumbler of rum and water, well sweetened, with a slip of mint in it.”. An appearance of a mint julep in print came in a book by John Davis published in London in 1803, in which it was described as "a dram of spirituous liquor that has mint steeped in it, taken by Virginians of a morning." Davis' interviewee mentions his love for whiskey came from his daily preparation of the drink.

Virginia taverns such as J. Pryor's Haymarket Inn in Richmond began including ice-houses (possibly for the iced cocktails too) in their infrastructure in the 1780s, and the first mention of "Iced Julep" appears on May 4, 1807, in an advertisement for the Wig-Wam Gardens in Norfolk.

U.S. Senator Henry Clay of Kentucky introduced the drink to Washington, D.C., at the Round Robin Bar in the Willard Hotel during his residence in the city.

Americans enjoyed not only bourbon-based juleps during the nineteenth century, but also gin-based juleps made with genever, an aged gin.

By 1820, the julep was a legacy in Virginia and had been adopted as an item of local identity. The first acknowledged master of mint juleps was Jasper Crouch from Richmond, who identified himself as a Free Person of Color.

In the 1830s, in New York, a version of the drink was known as "hailstone" julep or "hailstorm" julep, which included small "hailstones" or pounded small lumps of ice.

British captain Frederick Marryat's 1840 book Second Series of A Diary in America describes on page 41 the "real mint julep" thus:

There are many varieties [of Mint Julep], such as those composed of Claret, Madeira, &c.; but the ingredients of the real mint-julep are as follows. I learnt how to make them, and succeeded pretty well. Put into a tumbler about a dozen sprigs of the tender shoots of mint, upon them put a spoonful of white sugar, and equal proportions of peach and common brandy, so as to fill it up one-third, or perhaps a little less. Then take rasped or pounded ice, and fill up the tumbler. Epicures rub the lips of the tumbler with a piece of fresh pine-apple, and the tumbler itself is very often incrusted outside with stalactites of ice. As the ice melts, you drink.

The 1862 edition of Bar-Tenders Guide: How to Mix Drinks or The Bon-Vivant's Companion by Jerry Thomas includes five recipes for the mint julep (as well as an illustration of how it is to be served) allowing for either Cognac, brandy, gin, whiskey or sparkling Moselle. Thomas states of the mint julep, "... a peculiarly American beverage ... It was introduced [later] into England by Captain Maryatt."

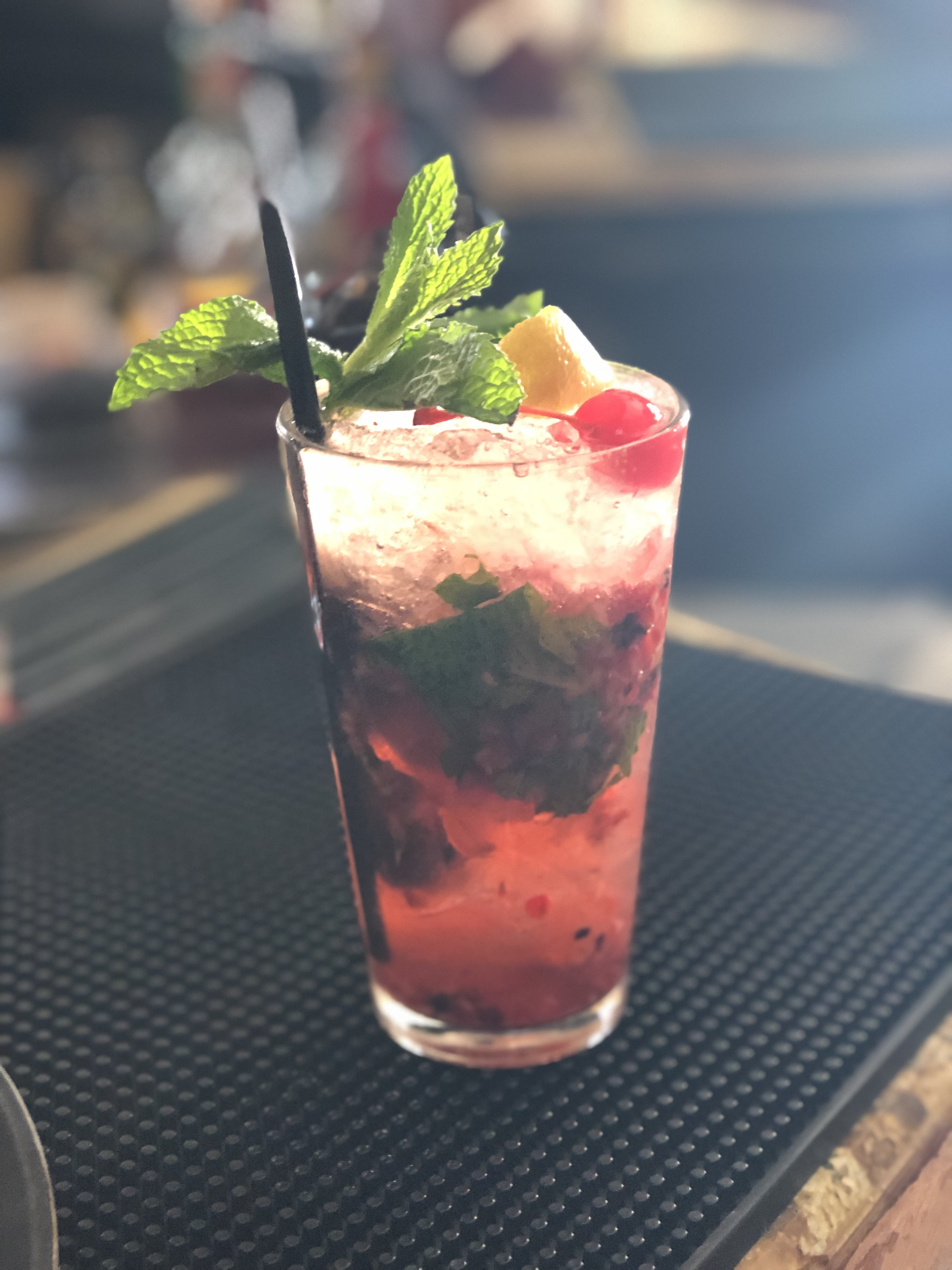
A holiday "Jingle Bell Julep" which uses macerated strawberry, cherries and raspberry instead of a mint base at the Round Robin Bar

In 1916, the traditional Virginia recipe as served at the "Old White" is described

... the famous old barroom, which was approached by a spiral staircase. Here in this dark, cool room, scented with great masses of fragrant mint that lay upon mountains of crushed ice, in the olden days were created the White Sulphur mint julep and the Virginia toddy, for which this place was famous the world over. The mint juleps were not the composite compounds of the present day. They were made of the purest French brandy, limestone water, old-fashioned cut loaf sugar, crushed ice, and young mint the foliage of which touched your ears ...

Beginning in the 20th century, bourbon-based juleps decisively eclipsed gin-based juleps.

The song "Lift the Juleps to Your Two Lips" was featured in the "talkie" movie musical On with the Show! in 1929.

== Kentucky Derby ==
The mint julep has been promoted by Churchill Downs in association with the Kentucky Derby since 1938. As of 2009, about 120,000 juleps were served at Churchill Downs over the two-day period of the Kentucky Oaks and the Kentucky Derby, virtually all of them in specially made Kentucky Derby collectible glasses.

In a contract arrangement between the Brown-Forman Corporation and Churchill Downs that has lasted more than 18 years, the Early Times Mint Julep Cocktail has been the designated "official mint julep of the Kentucky Derby", although the Early Times sold within the United States is a Kentucky whiskey, not a bourbon, due to its being aged in used, rather than new, oak barrels. However beginning in 2015, Old Forester, which is also produced by the Brown-Forman Corporation, is now "the official drink of the Kentucky Derby," when sold as Old Forester Mint Julep Ready-to-Serve Cocktail.

Since 2006, Churchill Downs has also served extra-premium custom-made mint juleps at a cost of $1000 each at the Kentucky Derby. These mint juleps were served in gold-plated cups with silver straws, and were made from Woodford Reserve bourbon, mint imported from Ireland, spring water ice cubes from the Bavarian Alps, and sugar from Australia. The proceeds were used to support charitable causes dedicated to retired race horses. Woodford Reserve, Early Times, and Old Forester are sister brands produced by Brown-Forman, and under the terms of its current marketing agreement with Churchill Downs, Woodford Reserve is called the "official bourbon" of the derby.

In May 2008, Churchill Downs unveiled the world's largest mint julep glass. Churchill Downs, in conjunction with Brown-Forman, commissioned the Weber Group to fabricate the 6-foot (1.8 m) tall glass (7.5-foot (2.3 m) if the mint sprig is included). The glass was constructed from FDA food-grade acrylic, heated and molded into the shape of an official 2008 Derby glass. It had a capacity of 206 US gallons (780 L; 172 imp gal), and distributed the Early Times mint juleps at the Derby with an elaborate pumping system concealed within the "stir straw".

== See also ==
- List of cocktails
- Old Fashioned
- "One Mint Julep"
