= George Garvin Brown IV =

Canadian businessman

- Born: 1969 or 1970 (age 56–57)
- Education: McGill University; London Business School
- Spouse: married
- Children: 2+
- Parent(s): George Garvin Brown III; Susan Casey Brown

George Garvin Brown IV (born July 20, 1969) is a Canadian businessman and the past chairman of the spirits company Brown–Forman, which owns brands including Jack Daniel's whiskey, Finlandia Vodka, Woodford Reserve and Old Forester bourbons, and Herradura tequila. Brown–Forman was founded by his great-great-grandfather George Garvin Brown in 1870.

The Brown family owns approximately 51% of Brown–Forman, and at least 25 family members share a fortune estimated at $12.3 billion.

== Early life ==
He is the son of George Garvin Brown III (1943–2010) and his first wife, Susan Casey Brown, of Montreal.

Brown grew up in Montreal, his mother's hometown, with his brother Campbell Brown, and his parents later divorced. He received a bachelor's degree from McGill University, and a master's degree (MBA) from the London Business School.

== Career ==
Brown was Chairman of Brown–Forman from 2007 until 2021, when we has succeeded by Campbell P. Brown.

== Personal life ==
Brown married his wife, from Toronto, in 1996, and they have two children together.
