= Early Times =

Kentucky whiskey produced by the Sazerac Company

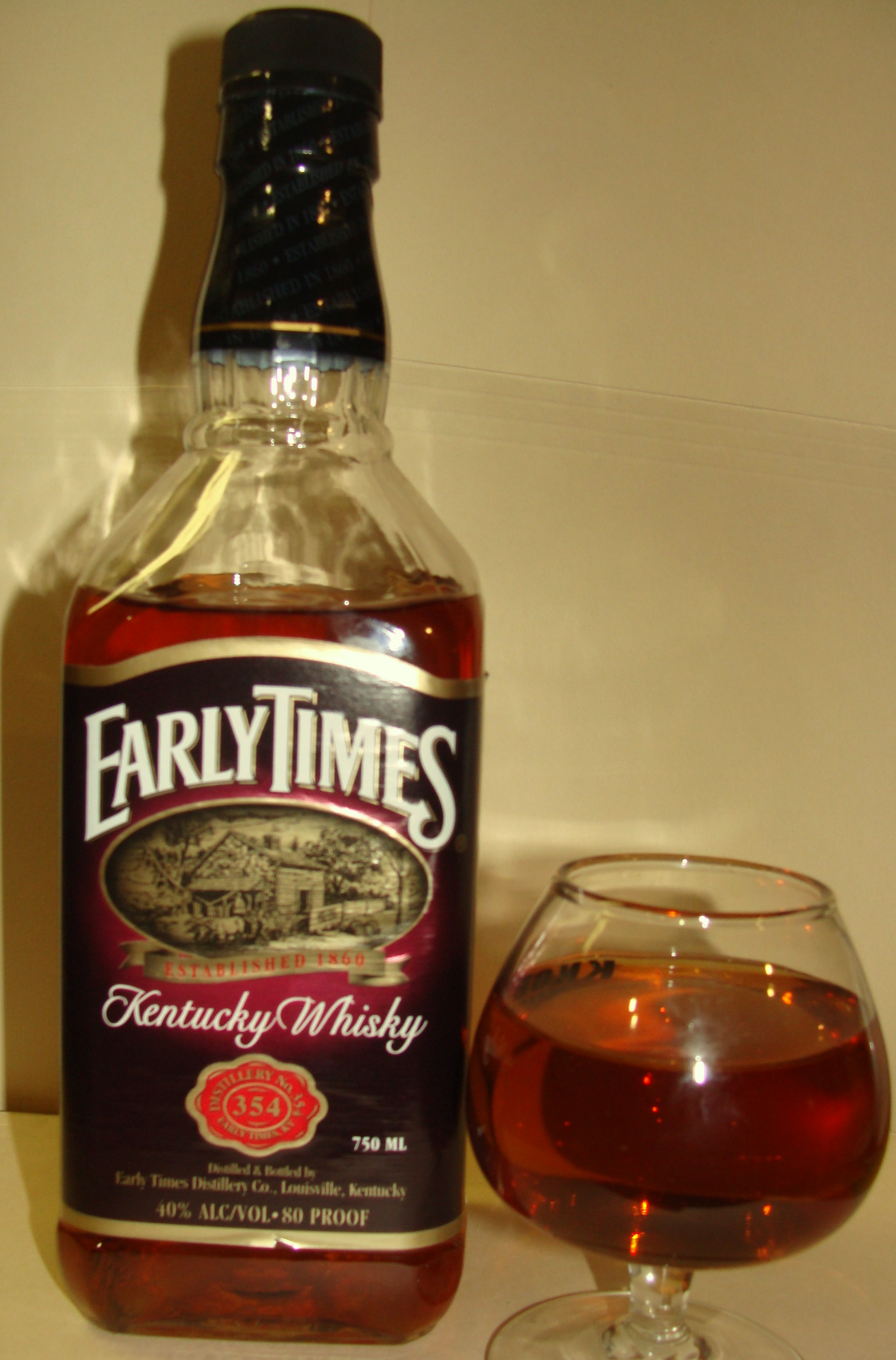
- A bottle of Early Times
- Type: American whiskey (labelled as Bourbon in export markets, and as Kentucky Whisky within the U.S.)
- Manufacturer: Brown-Forman (1923–2020); Sazerac Company (2020–present)
- Origin: Kentucky, United States
- Introduced: 1860
- Alcohol by volume: 40.00%
- Proof (US): 80
- Related products: Woodford Reserve

Early Times is a brand of Kentucky whiskey produced by the Sazerac Company, one of the two largest spirits companies in the United States, which purchased the brand in mid-2020. Before the brand purchase, it was distilled in Shively, Kentucky, by the Brown-Forman Corporation, another of the largest North American-owned companies in the spirits and wine business.

While Early Times is marketed outside the U.S. as bourbon whiskey, the primary brand variant does not meet all the U.S. regulated criteria for bourbon, as some of the whiskey in the bottle is aged in used barrels while bourbon regulations require only new charred barrels for aging. Subsequently, it is marketed within the U.S. without the bourbon label. A bottled-in-bond variant that meets the definition of bourbon was reintroduced in 2017.

== History ==
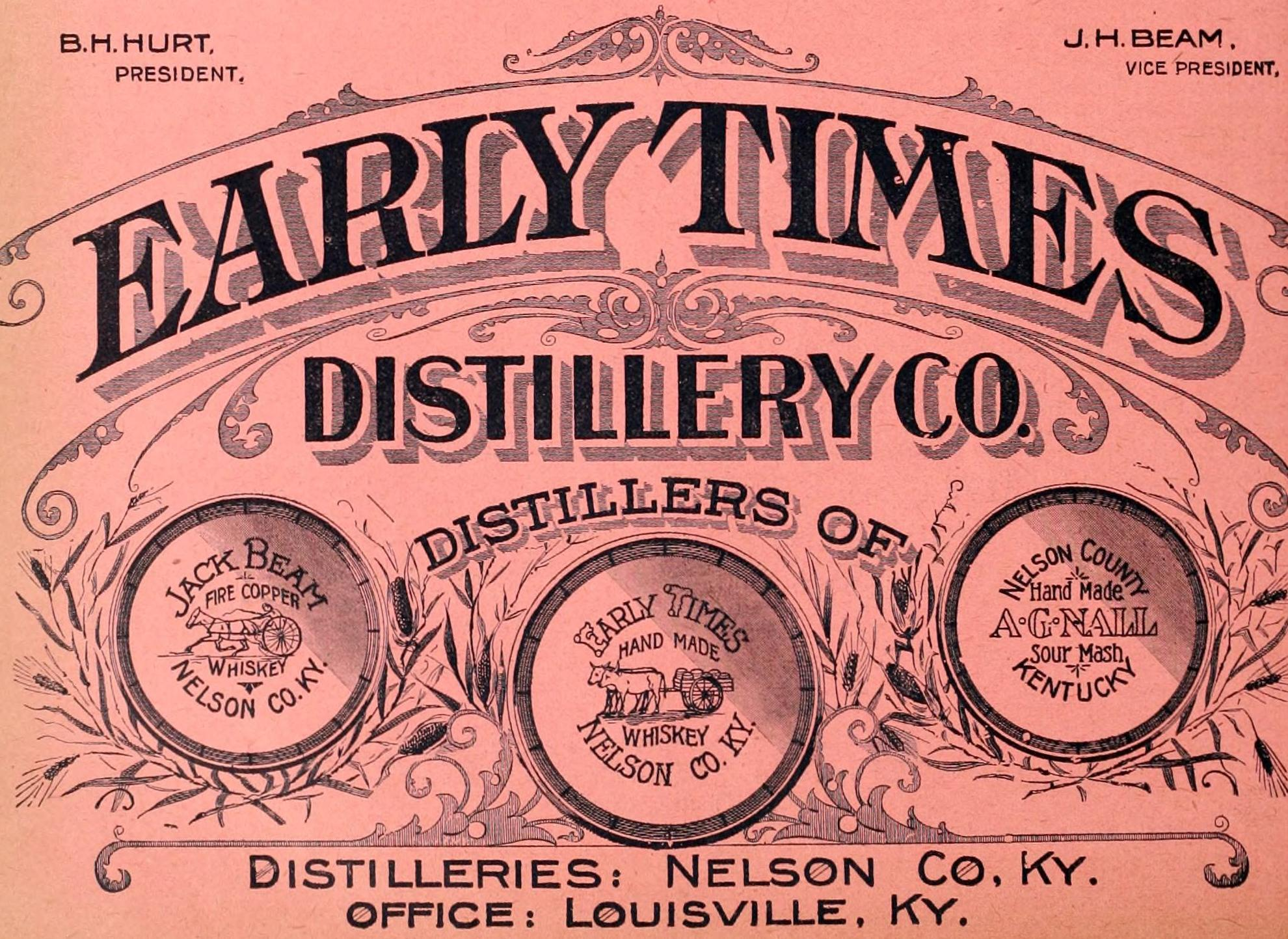
Early Times 1894 ad

The Early Times Whisky brand production started at Early Times Station, Kentucky, and was introduced in 1860. The Kentucky water surrounding the "Station" was used for making the whiskey. The water naturally filtered through limestone springs. Early Times was not popular until 1920 when Congress passed the Volstead Act and Prohibition began. The brand prospered due to its maker having a license to continue production for medicinal purposes.

The Brown-Forman Company acquired the Early Times brand in 1923, and over the next 30 years made Early Times the best-selling whisky in the country. It later became sold in over 40 countries. It ranks as one of the top four selling Kentucky whiskeys in the world, and in 2005 it became the top selling Kentucky whisky in Japan.

In mid-2020, the brand was sold to the Sazerac Company.

== Production and products ==
The brand was originally a straight bourbon whiskey. In 1982, while the brand was owned by Brown-Forman, some of the whiskey in Early Times began to be aged in used barrels. Regulations require the use of new barrels in aging bourbon, so the standard Early Times cannot legally be labeled as a bourbon within the U.S., so it is labeled as "Kentucky Whisky". It is bottled at 40 percent alcohol by volume.

In addition to the standard bottling, a bottled-in-bond expression, which does qualify as a straight bourbon, was reintroduced in 2017.

== Marketing activity ==
In 1987, Brown-Forman contracted with Churchill Downs to market Early Times mint juleps as the "official drink" of the Kentucky Derby. Until 2015, Early Times Mint Juleps were sold during Derby Week each year. The highest-priced mint juleps at the event use bourbon from the Brown-Forman sister brand, Woodford Reserve, which is marketed as the "official bourbon" of the Kentucky Derby. Old Forester, a bourbon also made by Brown-Forman, replaced Early Times starting May 2, 2015, as the standard Kentucky Derby whisky for the lower-priced mint juleps.
