= BenRiach distillery =

Scotch whisky distillery in Scotland

Coordinates: 57°36′43″N 3°17′34″W

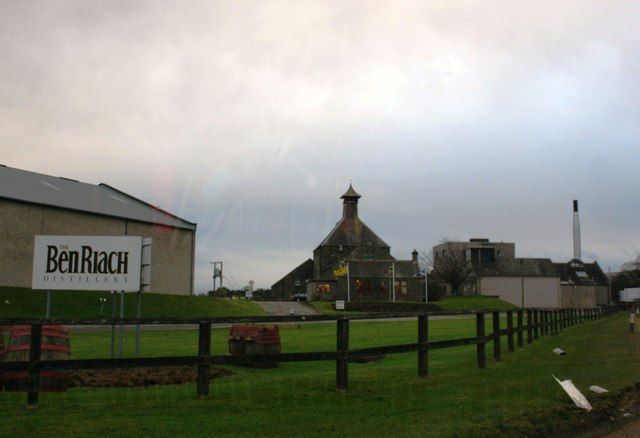
- Location: Moray, Scotland
- Owner: Brown-Forman
- Founded: 1898
- Status: Active
- Water source: Burnside Springs
- No. of stills: 2 wash stills 2 spirit stills
- Capacity: 1,300,000 litres (290,000 imp gal; 340,000 US gal)

The Original Ten
- Age(s): 10 years old
- Cask type(s): Ex-Bourbon, Ex-Sherry, Virgin Oak
- ABV: 43.0%

The Smoky Ten
- Age(s): 10 years old
- Cask type(s): Ex-Bourbon, Ex-Jamaican Rum, Toasted Virgin Oak
- ABV: 46.0%

The Twelve
- Age(s): 12 years old
- Cask type(s): Ex-Bourbon, Ex-Sherry, Ex-Port
- ABV: 46.0%

The Smoky Twelve
- Age(s): 12 years old
- Cask type(s): Ex-Bourbon, Ex-Sherry, Ex-Marsala
- ABV: 46.0%

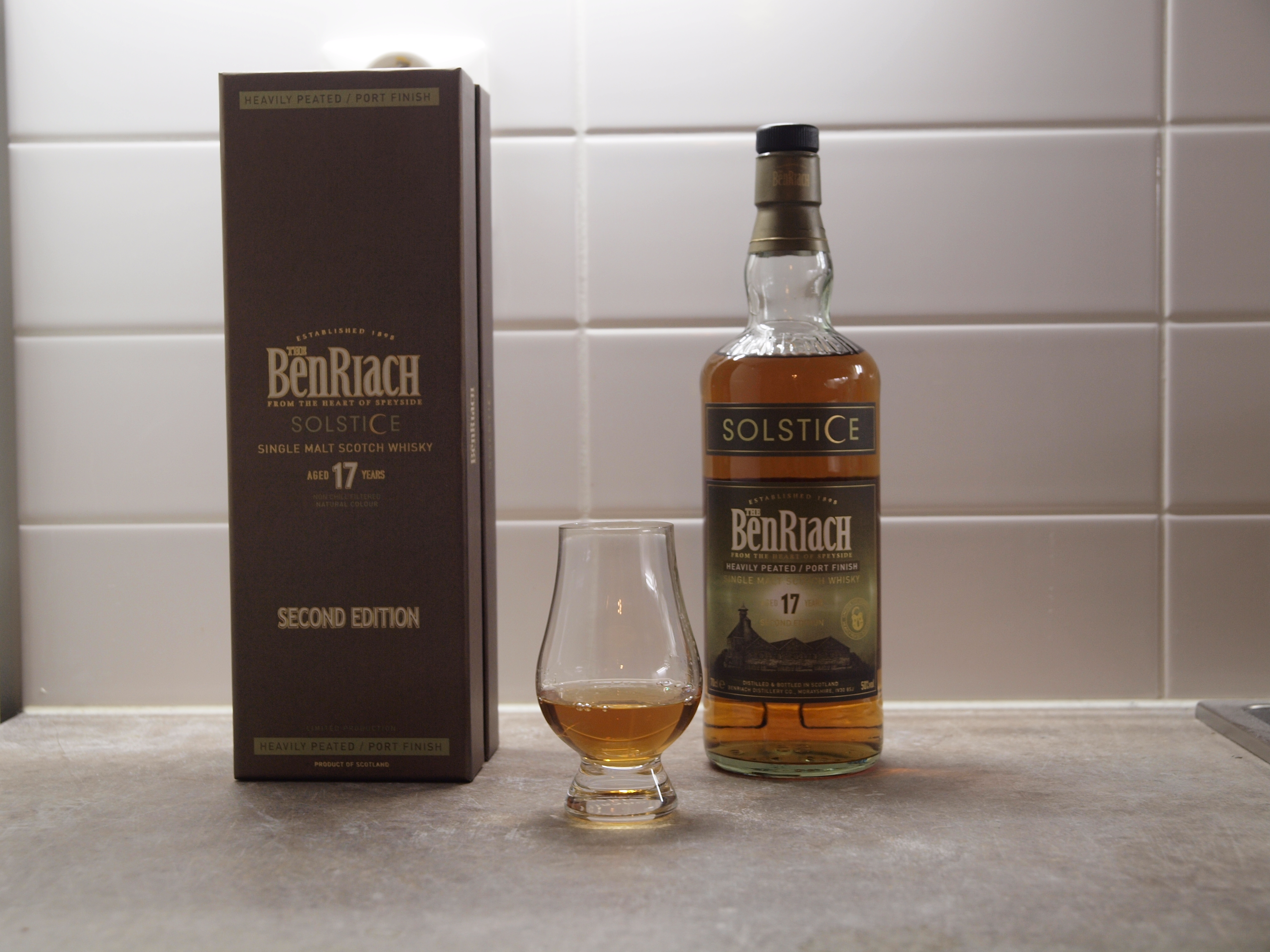
BenRiach Solstice whisky aged 17 years.

BenRiach distillery is a single malt Scotch whisky distillery in the Speyside area of Scotland. It is currently owned by Brown-Forman Corporation.

== History ==
The BenRiach Distillery was established by John Duff in 1898, in North Speyside, south of Elgin, close to the Longmorn Distillery which was also owned by Duff. The distilleries were joined by a private railway, with a private steam locomotive, the Puggy, to transport coal, barley, peat and barrels between the distilleries. Soon after the railway was established in 1900 the distillery stopped production in the wake of the bankruptcy of Pattisons Ltd., a major Scotch whisky purchaser. Only BenRiachs maltings remained in active use, producing malt for Longmorn. It didn't produce spirit again until 1965 when it was reopened by Glenlivet Distillers Ltd. In 1978 the distillery changed hands, this time to Seagrams. Seagrams became part of Pernod Ricard in 2001 and the BenRiach distillery began operating for just three months of every year. In 2004 the distillery was acquired by an independent consortium, the BenRiach Distillery Company Limited, formed by two South African funding partners, Geoff Bell and Wayne Keiswetter, and Scotch whisky expert Billy Walker.

In 2008, the company expanded their portfolio with the acquisition of the Glendronach distillery. as well as the Glenglassaugh distillery in March 2013. The distillery was sold off as a subsidiary on 1 June 2016 to Brown–Forman.

== Awards ==
- Global Whisky Distiller of the Year, World Whiskies Awards 2015
- Distillery of the Year, Malt Advocate Whisky Awards 2007
- Best Rare Speyside (BenRiach Authenticus 21 Year Old), World Whisky Awards, Whisky Magazine 2007
- Gold Medal (BenRiach 16 year old), International Wines and Spirits Competition 2006
- Silver Medals (BenRiach Heart of Speyside, 12 year old, Curiositas and Authenticus), International Wines and Spirits Competition 2006
- Best Performing Small Business Award, under 25 employees, Enterprising Scotland Awards 2006
- Best International Business Award, Enterprising Scotland Awards 2005
