= Glendronach distillery =

Distillery in Aberdeenshire, Scotland

Coordinates: 57.4847°N 2.6255°W

GlenDronach distillery
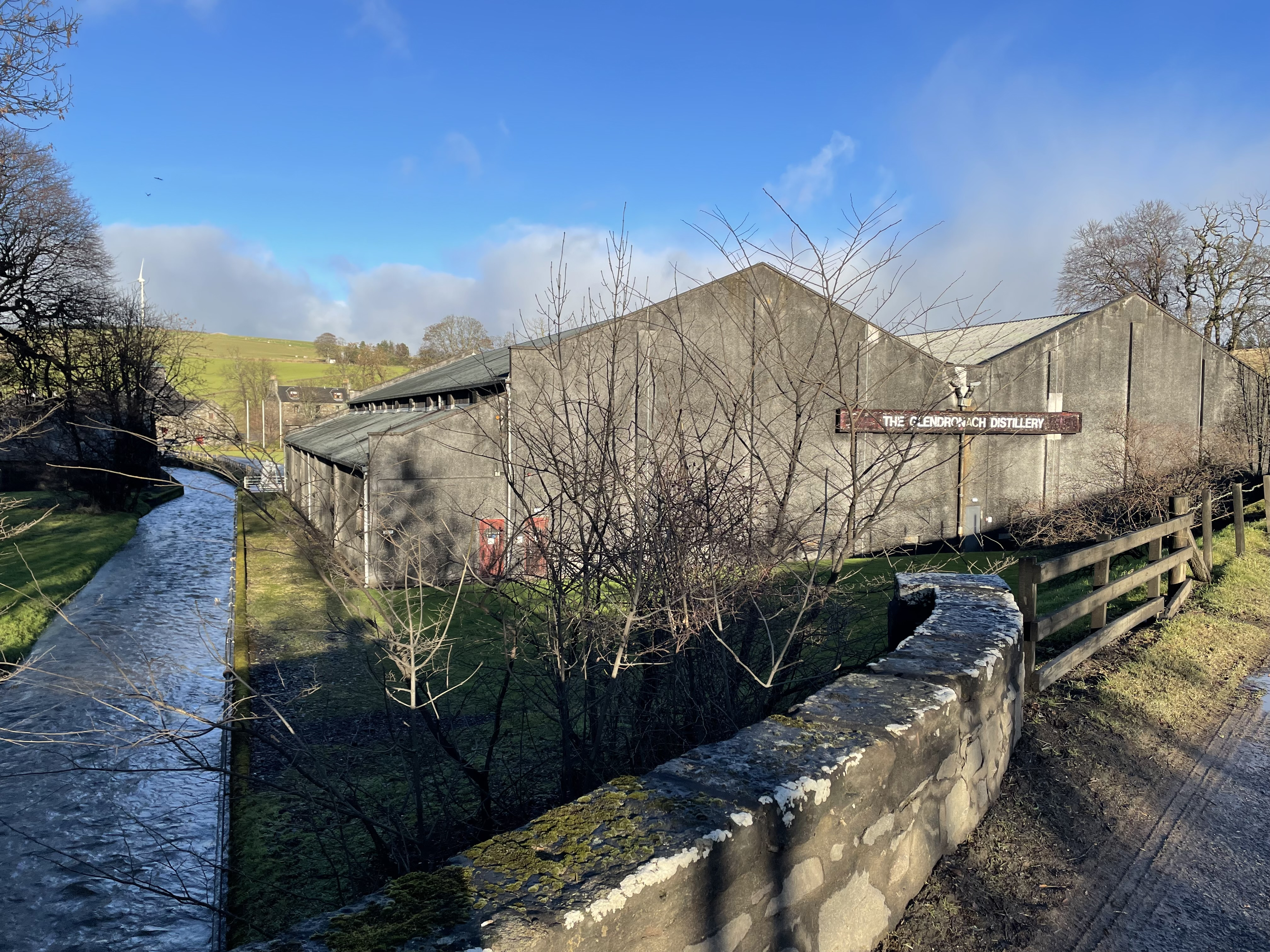

Region: Highland
- Owner: Brown-Forman
- Founded: 1826
- Status: Active
- Water source: Dronac Burn
- No. of stills: 2 wash (13,635 L), 2 spirit (6,800 L)
- Capacity: 1,300,000 litres per annum

GlenDronach Single Malt
- Age(s): 8 Year (The Hielan) bourbon/sherry casks - 46% ABV; 12 Year (Original) - PX/Oloroso sherry casks - 43% ABV; 15 Year (Revival) - Oloroso sherry casks - 46% ABV; 18 Year (Allardice) - Oloroso sherry casks - 46% ABV; 20 Year (Octaves) - small casks, limited to 371 bottles 21 Year (Parliament) - PX/Oloroso sherry casks - 48% ABV; 31 Year (Grandeur) - Oloroso sherry casks - 45.8% ABV; 33 Year Old - Oloroso sherry casks
- Cask type(s): Pedro Ximenez/Oloroso Sherry/Bourbon
- ABV: 43-48%

Wood Finishes
- Age(s): 12 Year Old (Sauternes); 14 Year Old (Virgin Oak); 15 Year Old (Moscatel); 18 Year Old (Marsala, Tawny Port); 19 Year Old (Madeira)
- Cask type(s): American & European Oak
- ABV: 46%

Cask Strength
- Age(s): No Age Statement
- Cask type(s): Pedro Ximenez/Oloroso Sherry
- ABV: >54%

Peated
- Age(s): No Age Statement
- Cask type(s): Oloroso Sherry

Glendronach distillery is a Scottish whisky distillery located near Forgue, by Huntly, Aberdeenshire, in the Highland whisky district. It is owned by the Brown–Forman Corporation.

The name Glendronach derives from the Scottish Gaelic gleann dronach which means 'valley of the brambles' or 'valley of the blackberries'.

== History ==
The distillery was founded in 1826 by James Allardes (referred to often as Allardice) as the second distillery to apply for a licence to legally produce whisky under the Excise Act 1823, which passed three years earlier and which allowed for the distilling of whisky in Scotland. Other sources credit a consortium of farmers and businessmen for the foundation of the distillery though this could include Allardes. Notable owners include Walter Scott, who acquired it in 1881 and Charles Grant, son of the founder of the Glenfiddich distillery, in 1920.

The Glendronach distillery was purchased by William Teacher & Sons in 1960 who increased the number of stills from two to six. It was sold in 1976 to the company that would become Allied Domecq.

In 1996 the distillery was mothballed and reopened again in 2002 by Allied Domecq. In 2006 the distillery passed into the hands of Chivas Brothers Ltd (part of the Pernod Ricard group) and in 2008 it was sold to the BenRiach Distillery Company.

In April 2016 Glendronach Distillery was purchased by the Brown–Forman Corporation. The deal also included BenRiach and Glenglassaugh distilleries.

== Production ==
The distillery draws its water from the Dronac burn within the distillery grounds. It has its own floor maltings and two wash stills in addition to two spirit stills.

The distillery is protected as a category B listed building.

The core range of whiskies consists of expressions matured in ex-sherry casks, in particular oloroso and PX.

The common exploration is 12 years, 15 years, 18 years, and 21 years.
