= Glenglassaugh distillery =

Malt scotch whisky distillery in Scotland

Coordinates: 57°40′46″N 2°44′13″W

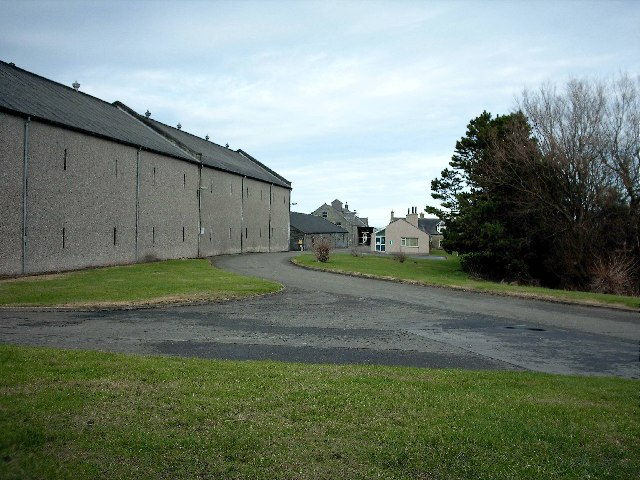

Region: Highland
- Location: Portsoy, Banffshire
- Owner: Brown-Forman
- Founded: 1875
- Status: Operational
- Water source: Glassaugh Spring
- No. of stills: 1 wash still 1 spirit still
- Capacity: 1,000,000 litres/per annum
- Mothballed: 1986–2008

Glenglassaugh logo

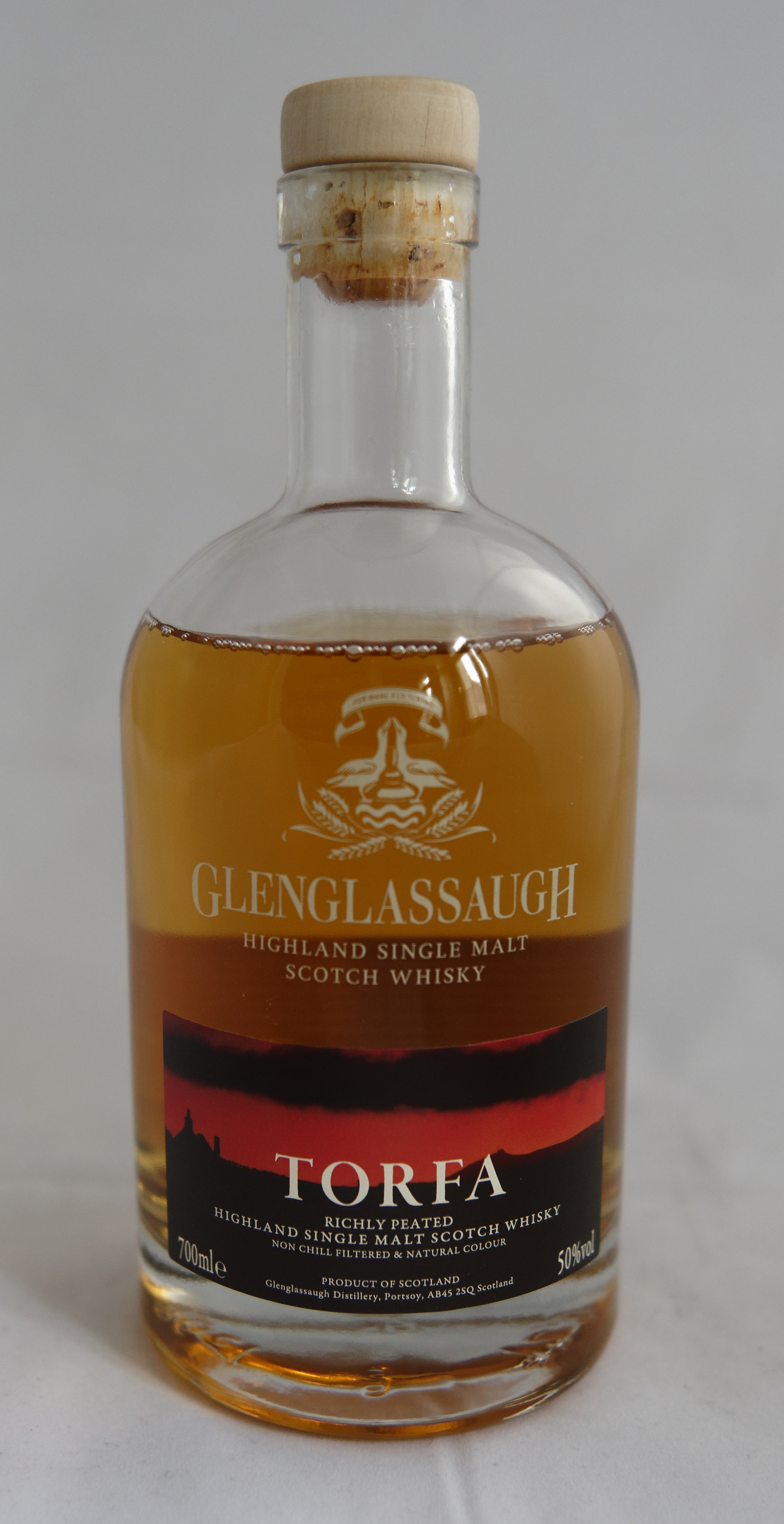
Glenglassaugh Torfa, 50% vol., richly peated

Glenglassaugh distillery (/ɡlɛnˈɡlæsɔː/) is a malt scotch whisky distillery at Sandend in Aberdeenshire, Scotland. It restarted production in November 2008 after being acquired by an independent investment group. It was then bought by Brown-Forman and mothballed in 2025.

== History ==
The Glenglassaugh Distillery is a single malt Scotch whisky distillery located in a picturesque site just outside the Speyside region in Northeast Scotland, between the village of Sandend and the small town of Portsoy, Banffshire some 54 miles northwest of Aberdeen. The distillery was established in 1875 by a local entrepreneur James Moir and his two nephews, Alexander and William Morrison. James Moir had an expanding grocery business in the town of Portsoy and was wanting to establish a distillery that would produce a whisky of the highest quality to satisfy the growing demand from his customers. The site was originally chosen due to its proximity to a clean and pure water supply (Glassaugh Springs), easy access to the nearby barley fields and because it was known locally to have been the site of one of the many illicit distilleries that had operated in the area and which had produced excellent whisky. Following the death of both James Moir and William Morrison, Alexander Morrison was forced to sell the distillery and in 1892 the company was sold to Highland Distillers and until 2008 has been owned by them. Highland Distillers is a subsidiary of The Edrington Group. Following a complete refurbishment by the new owners the distillery was re-opened on 24 November 2008 by then First Minister for Scotland Alex Salmond.

On 16 December 2011 the first bottling of Glenglassaugh whisky from spirit distilled under the present ownership was bottled and released for sale only from the distillery shop. The history of Glenglassaugh distillery up to and including the first launches by the Scaent Group was described by whisky writer Ian Buxton in his book Glenglassaugh: A Distillery Reborn.

In March 2013, the BenRiach distillery acquired the Glenglassaugh distillery from its previous owners, who were listed as Amsterdam-based Lumiere Holdings. Benriach Distillery company also operates the Benriach and Glendronach Distilleries. In June 2016, Brown-Forman Corporation acquired the BenRiach Distillery Company and its subsidiaries, therefore making Brown-Forman the current owners of the Glenglassaugh distillery. In June 2023, Glenglassaugh released a new portfolio, including a flagship 12 year old single malt. The overall artistic direction takes inspiration from rippling sand at Sandend Bay, with touches of colour inspired by sea glass. In January 2025, Brown-Forman announced that will intermittently pause production at the Glenglassaugh distillery rotate staff between BenRiach and Glenglassaugh as part of several cost-cutting measures.

== Gallery ==
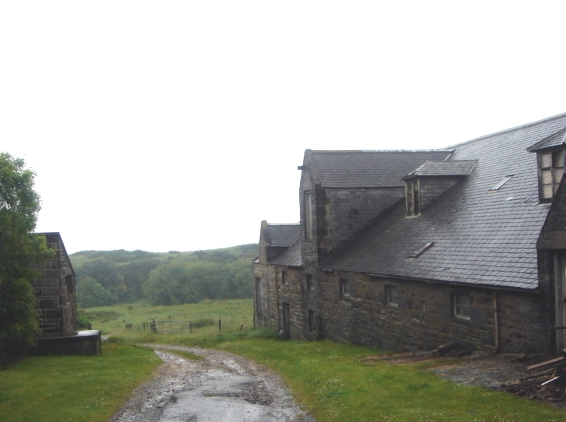
Old Maltings

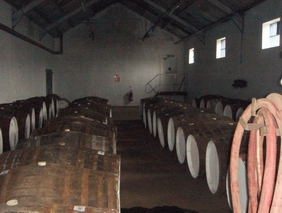
Filling Store

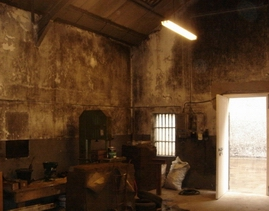
Old Cooperage

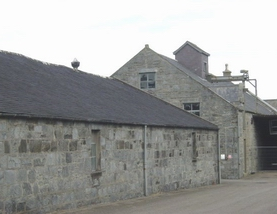
Old Warehouse

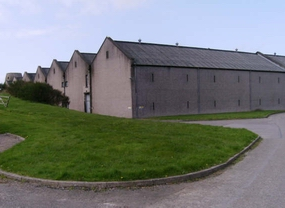
Distillery Entrance

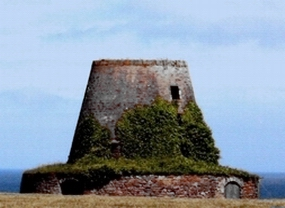
Old Glenglassaugh Windmill

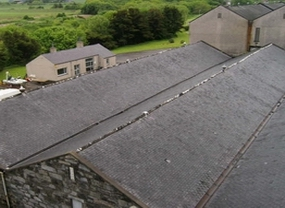
Old Warehouse Roof

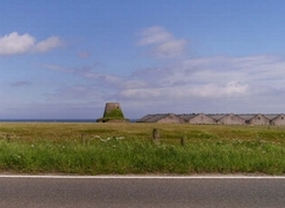
Old Windmill From Road

== See also ==
- Glassaugh railway station – once provided transport for distillery workers
