= Sandend =

Village in Aberdeenshire, Scotland

Coordinates: 57°41′N 2°45′W

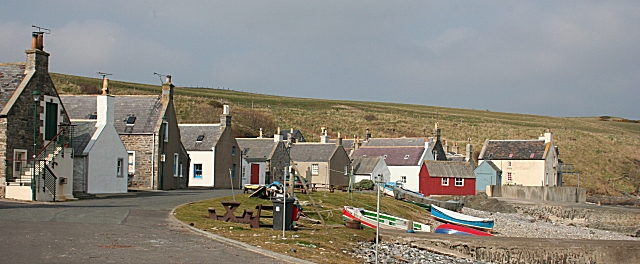
Old fishers' cottages in Sandend, built with the gables facing seawards

Sandend (Scots: Sanine) is a small fishing village near Banff and Portsoy, Aberdeenshire, Scotland, typical of the area. It was "a considerable seatown as early as 1624".

In the late 19th and early 20th centuries it was an active village. There were two fish-houses in Sandend (Smith's and McKay's). After McKay's relocation to Buckie, only Smith's remains in Sandend.

It now is a popular place for caravaners, holidaymakers and watersports enthusiasts. Local attractions include a sandy beach and an annual kipper barbecue, held in summer.

In January 2018, locals opposed plans for the export cable from the Moray West Offshore Windfarm, that would have affected the beach. In July 2018 the cable landing point was moved to West Head, almost a mile east along the coast.

It is home to the Glenglassaugh distillery.

Findlater Castle is nearby, while Birkenbog House, built in the early 18th century, is the ancient seat of the Abercrombies, who eventually left for Glassaugh. It was abandoned as of 1990.

== Fishing ==
The Annual Reports of the Fishery Board for Scotland provide an insight into the fishing in Sandend in the years before the First World War. In 1901 the report states that Sandend was "entirely confined to line fishing" In 1914, this was still the case, but we also learn that "two second-class motor boats [were] added to the fleet."

Fishery Statistics

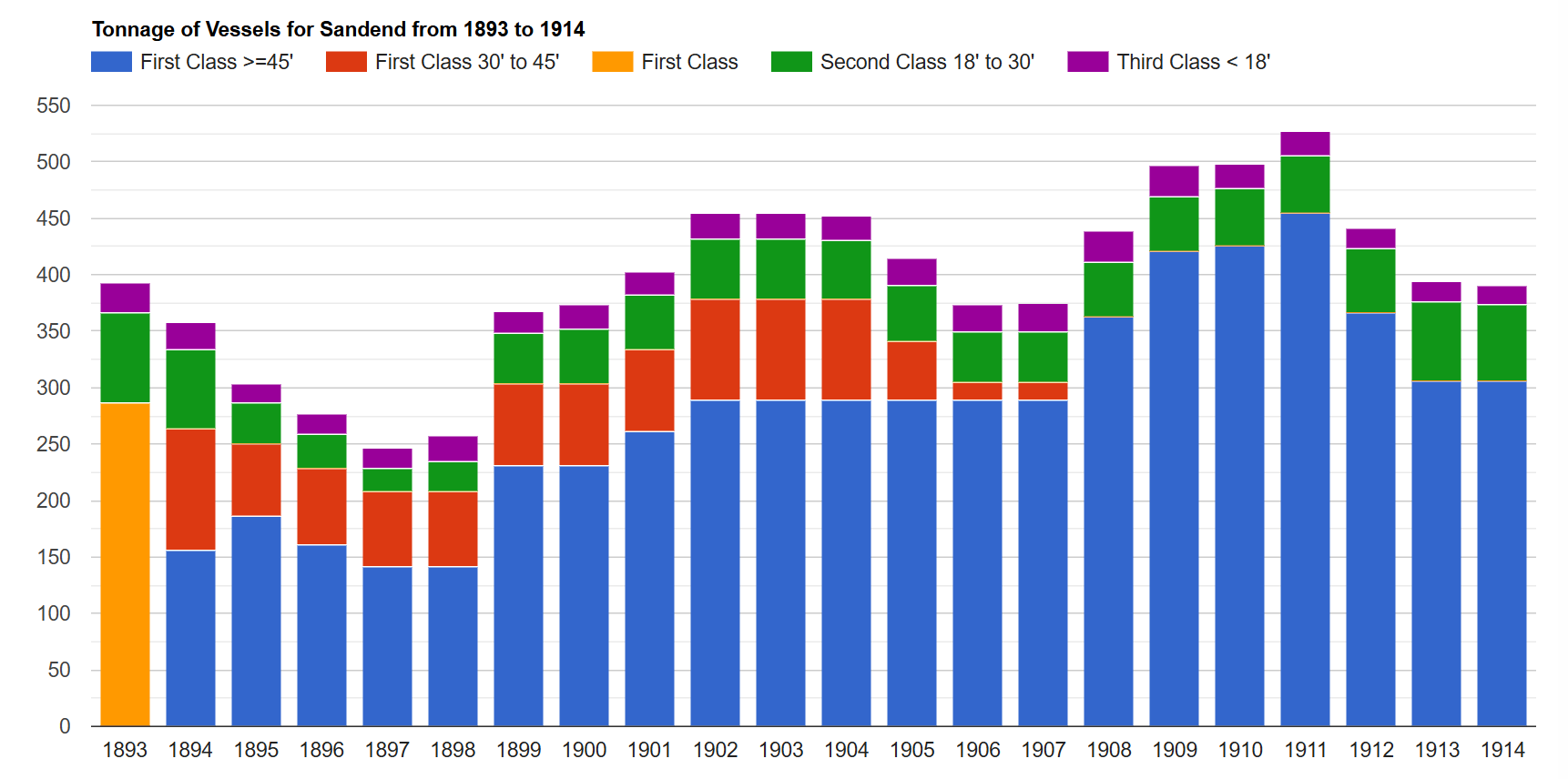
Tonnage of vessels

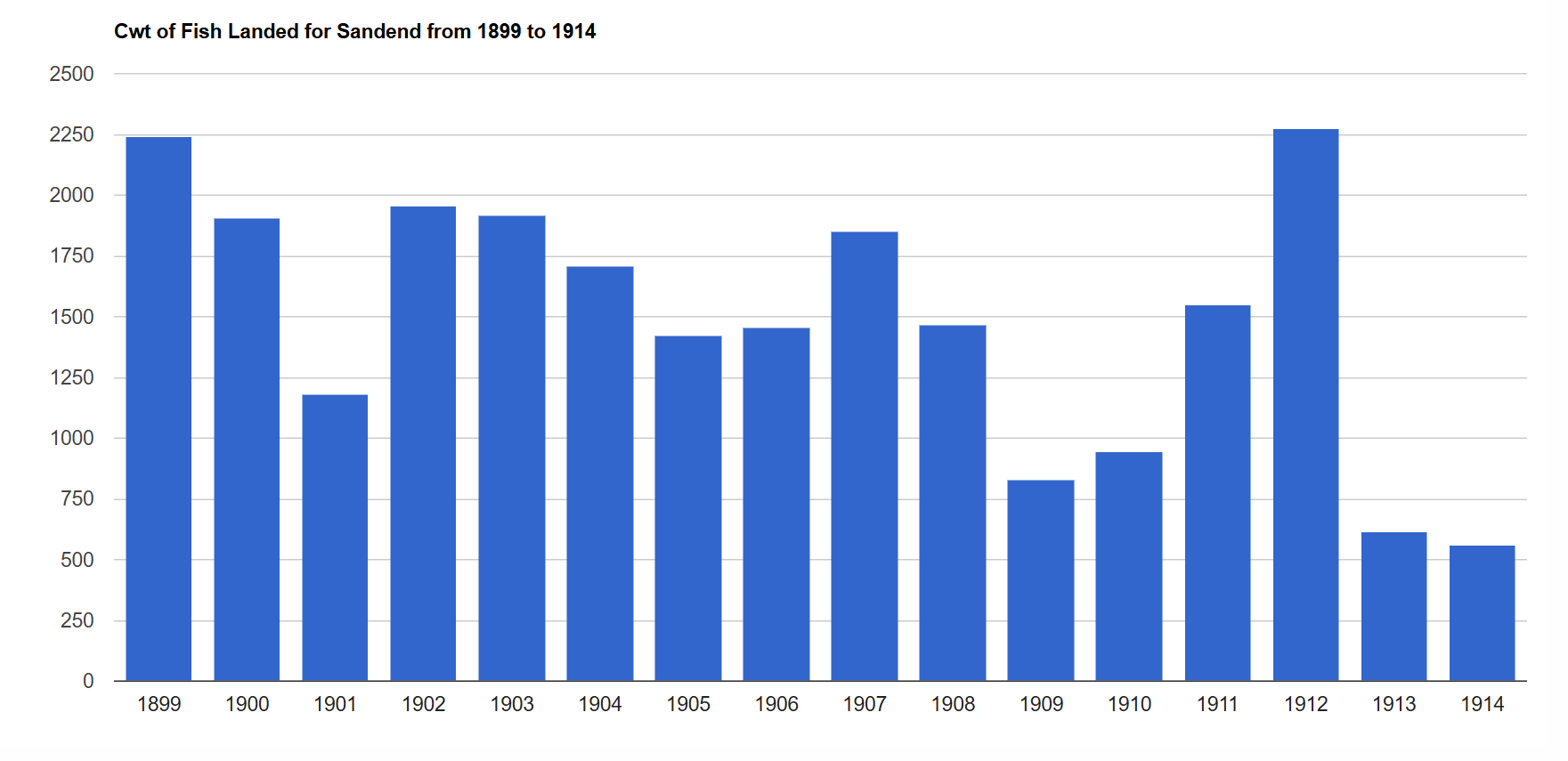
Cwt of fish landed

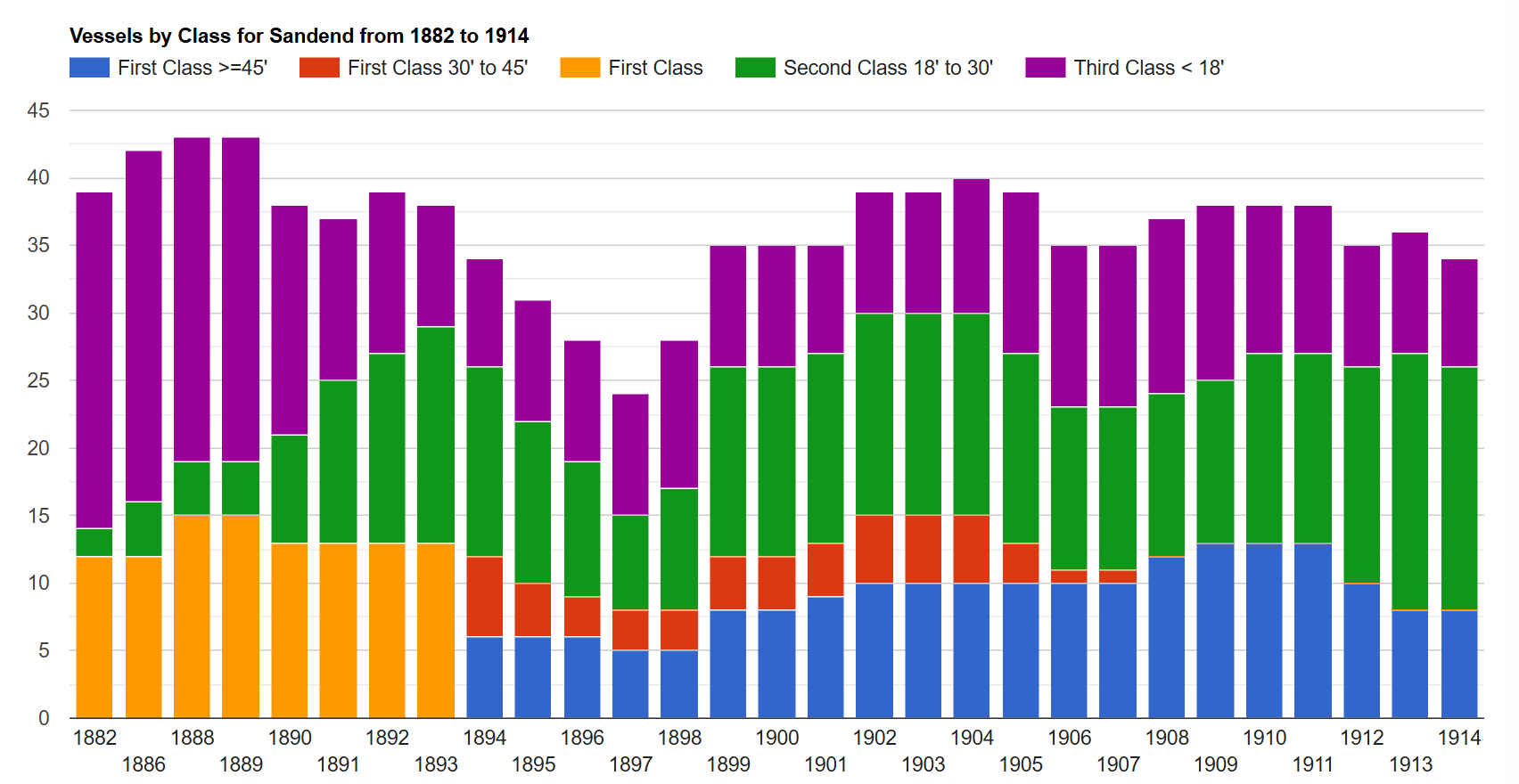
Vessels by class

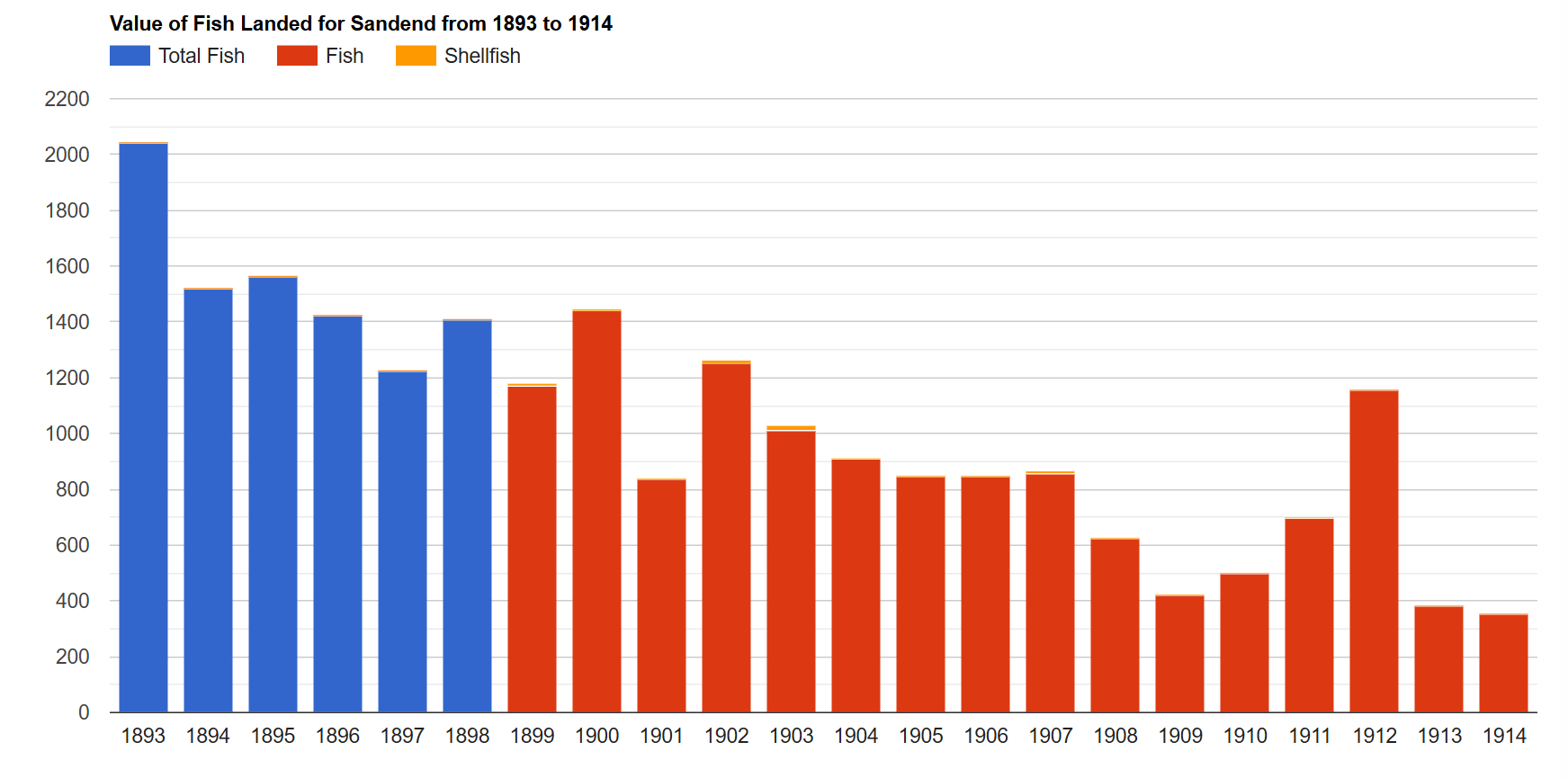
Value (£) of fish landed

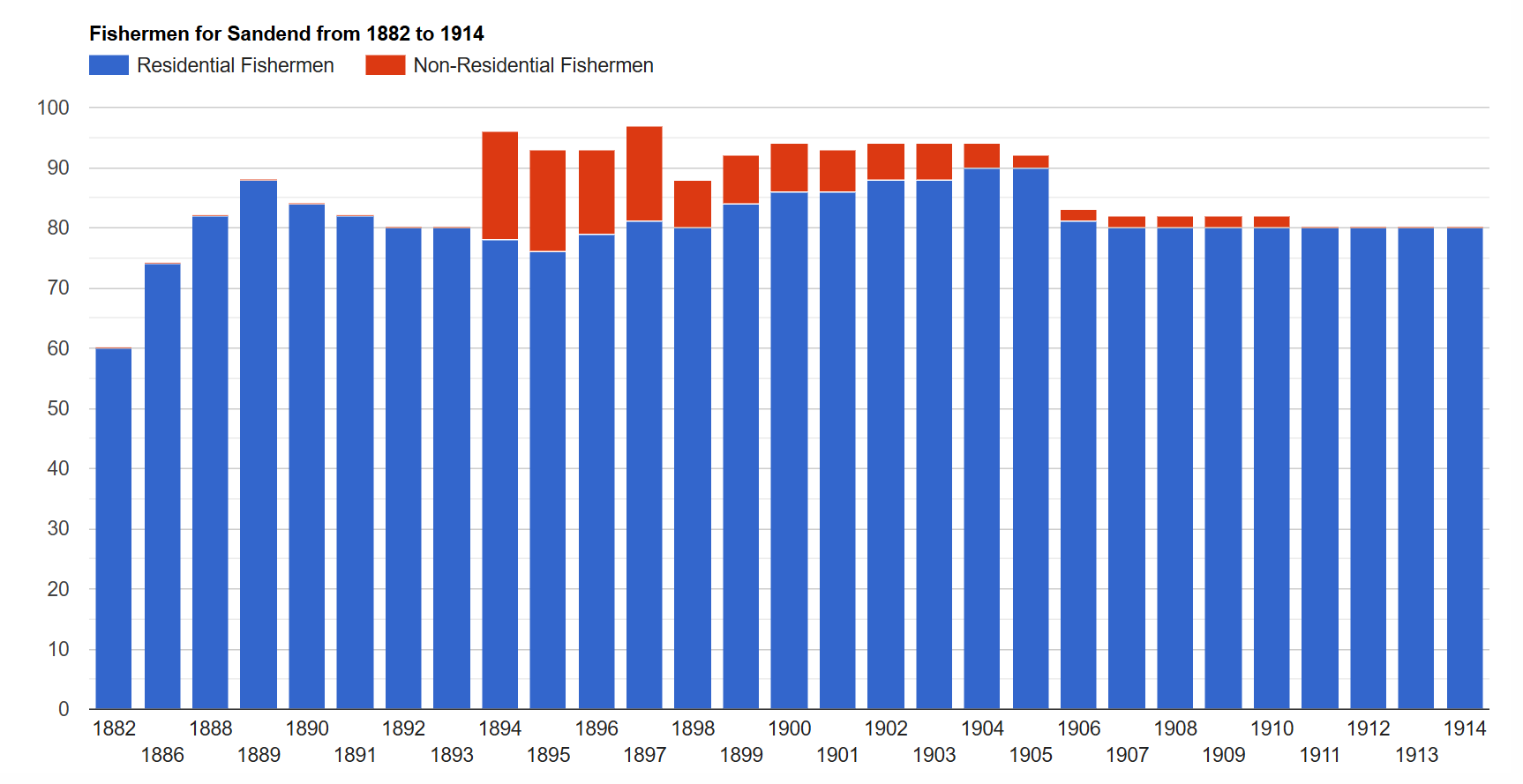
Fishermen

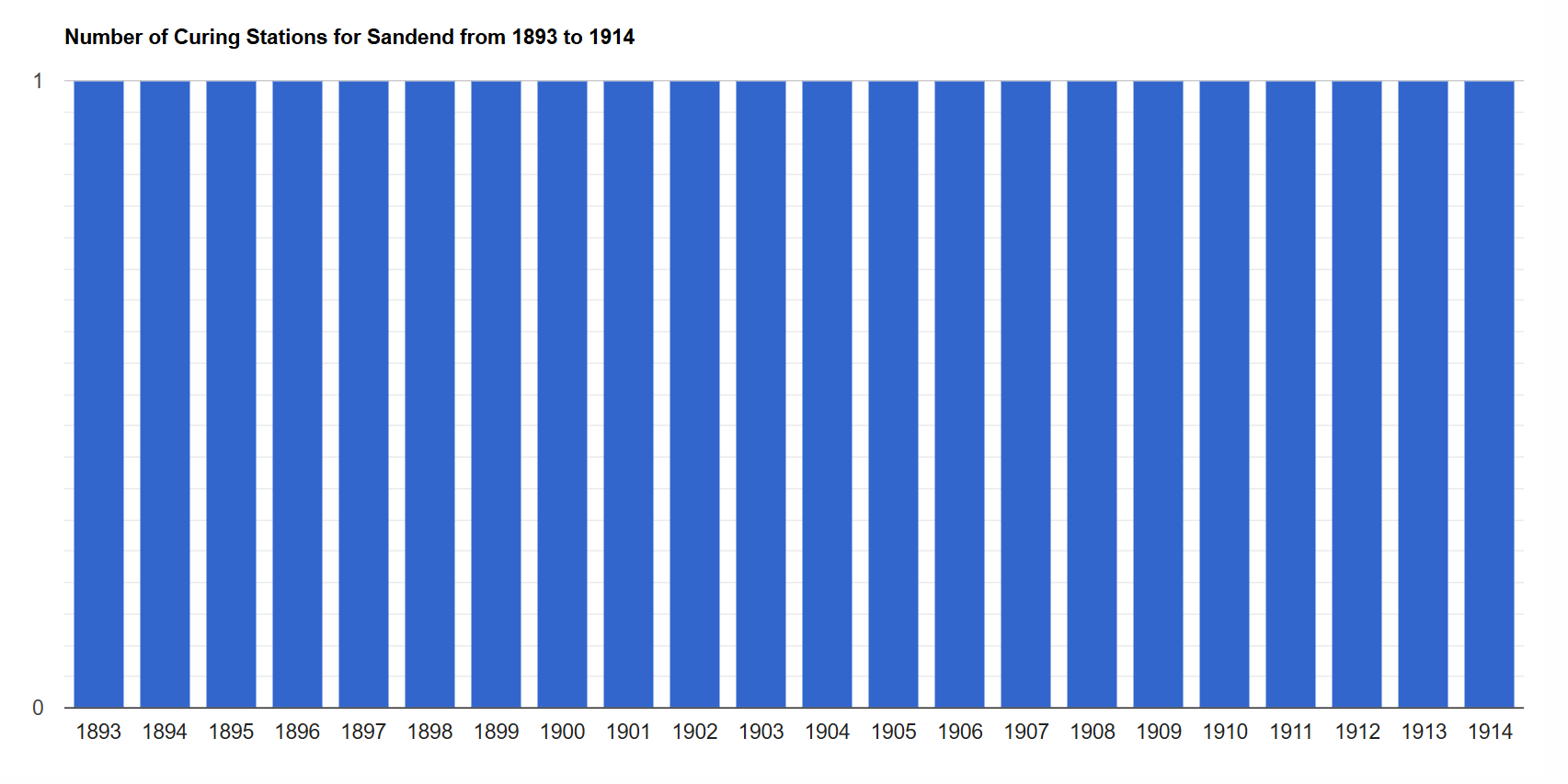
Number of curing stations
