= Tequila Herradura =

Mexican tequila distiller

Grupo Industrial Herradura
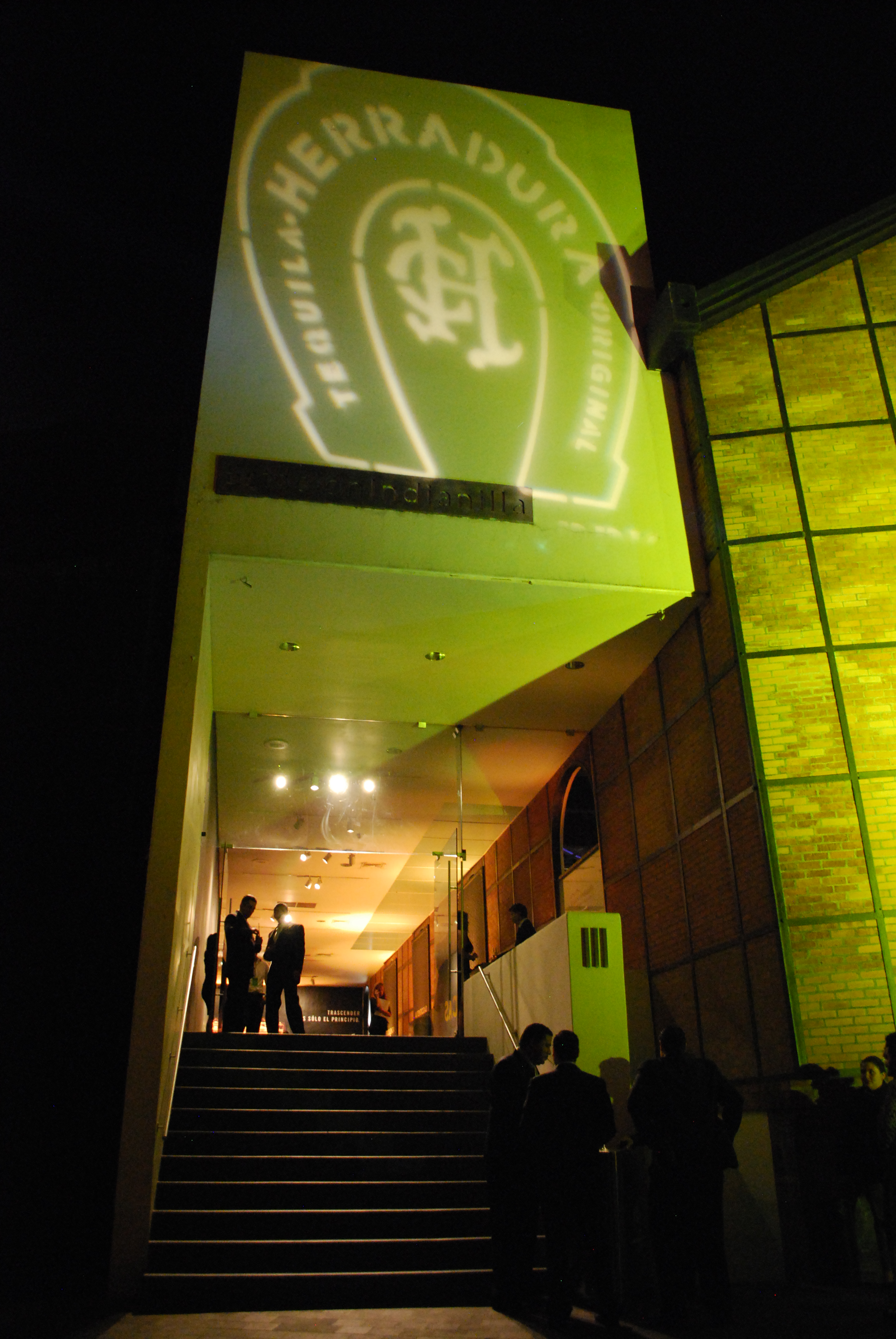
- Company type: Subsidiary of Brown-Forman
- Industry: Manufacturing and Distillation of Tequila
- Founded: 1870; 156 years ago
- Founder: Félix López
- Headquarters: Amatitán, Jalisco, Mexico
- Key people: Randy McCann (General Director)
- Parent: Brown-Forman Corporation
- Website: www.herradura.com

Tequila Herradura (officially Grupo Industrial Herradura) is a tequila distillery located in Amatitán, Jalisco, Mexico. It was formally founded in 1870 by Aurelio López and the business remained in the family for over 125 years. Today it is owned by US beverage maker Brown-Forman, but the tequila is still made in the same place and facilities under a Mexican subsidiary. Tequila products sold under the Herradura name are 100% agave. The company makes other tequila products, such as El Jimador, which is the best-selling tequila in Mexico, as well as New Mix, a tequila and grapefruit soda beverage. Since its acquisition by Brown-Forman, Herradura has had many promotional efforts in Mexico and the United States, including inviting artists to use tequila barrels as the bases for art pieces, which are then displayed and auctioned off for charity.

== History ==
The first known owner of the tequila-producing property was Feliciano Romo in the early 19th century. The official history of Herradura begin with Félix López, who began as the distillery administrator under then owners Josefa Salazar and her sons. In 1870, López took over the distillery and agave fields and registered it as a tequila producer under the name of Hacienda San José del Refugio.

Félix López married Carmen Rosales, and they had two children, Aurelio and María de Jesús. The couple modernized tequila production at the hacienda, building a facility that remained in use until 1963. López died in 1878, and Rosales took over the business along with her brother Ambrosio Rosales and his wife, Elisa Gomez Cuervo. Later, the business was inherited by Aurelio López.

The construction of railroads in the late 19th century allowed for easier shipping to other parts of Mexico and increased tequila's popularity in the country. By this time, the hacienda's tequila was well known, with Aurelio giving it the name of Herradura. The name, which means horseshoe in Spanish, is a said to have come from the finding of a horseshoe on the hacienda property. Stories vary, but the one told by the company's website says that it was found in the early 1900s by Aurelio while inspecting the agave fields. It gleamed like gold, and the horseshoe was kept for luck, then naming the tequila after it. In the 1920s the Cristero War broke out, with both Aurelio and his sister María de Jesus as sympathizers. At one point, government troops surrounded the hacienda, but the siblings were able to escape. However, Aurelio never returned to the hacienda again.

The hacienda passed into the hand of Aurelio's cousin David Rosales, who kept the tequila 100% agave despite the trend towards blending to cut costs. In 1928, he registered the Herradura brand in Mexico City with a horseshoe as its logo. María de Jesús was able to return to Herradura and distinguished herself with charitable works to the town of Amatitán, including the building of wells in an area with little water.

The hacienda and the Herradura brand remained in the family for over a century. In the 1960s, the old factory was shut down in favor of a new one but kept as a museum. During this time, Herradura Añejo Tequila was introduced with Reposado introduced in 1974. In 1994, the el Jimador brand was introduced and became the #1 seller in Mexico. New Mix, a ready-made tequila cocktail, was introduced in 1997 and also became the best-selling beverage of its kind.

In the 1990s, there was conflict over sales of shares in the company by some members of the family as well as agave growing land. Part of the legal problems stemmed from selling shares to non-Mexican entities. In 2004, Herradura bought back foreign-owned shares, making the company 100% Mexican owned again. At this time, the company controlled thirty percent of the Mexican tequila markets behind Jose Cuervo’s forty percent share.

However, in 2007 all assets of the company were sold for US$776 million to the US-based company Brown-Forman, which produces other alcoholic beverages such as Jack Daniel's, Southern Comfort, Finlandia Vodka and Korbel California Champagne. That same year Herradura was named "best distillery of 2007" by Wine Enthusiast Magazine .

Since 2007, the brand has slowly become more internationally recognized. When Brown-Forman bought it, the brand was sold in fifty-three countries. Today, it is sold in 136 countries through the Brown-Forman network in Europe, South America, North America, and Asia. Its market share in the United States and other countries has been growing as well.

== Facilities ==
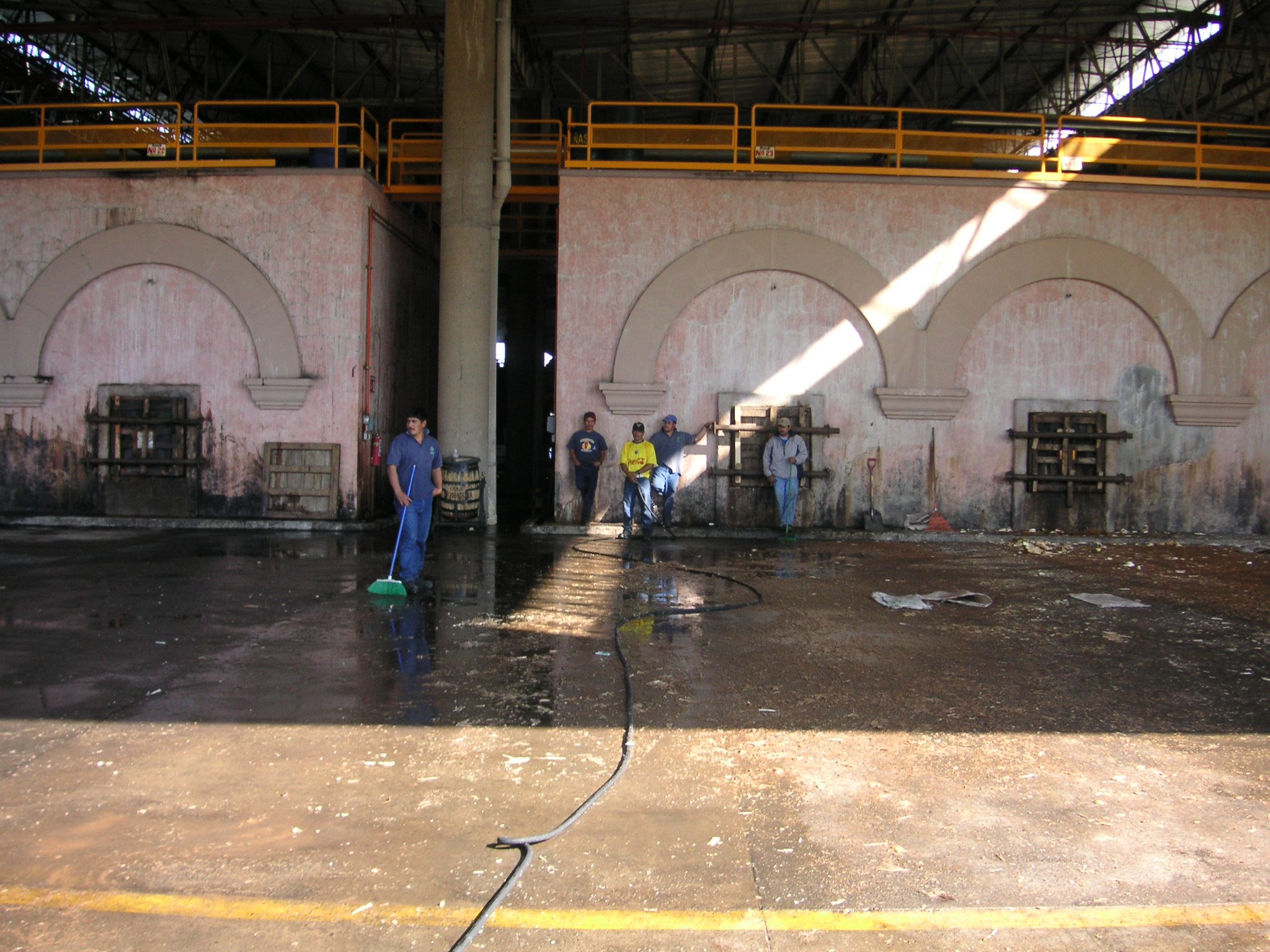
Traditional oven in which the agave heart is baked at the Herradura tequila factory in Amatitán between Guadalajara and Tequila, Jalisco, Mexico

Although owned by Brown-Forman, the facilities are still based in Amatitán. Jalisco is run by Grupo Industrial Herradura under manager Randy McCann. The hacienda is the setting of several legends and ghost stories. These include sightings of old conquistadors, and stories related to the various tunnels that were dug on the hacienda property during the Cristero War. Over its history, the company has run all aspects of tequila production from growing the agave to bottling the final product. Herradura brand tequilas are still made with agave hearts roasted in clay ovens and fermented with wild yeast. In the late 2000s, the company invested about US$15 million in water treatment plants, the Amatitán distillery, new laboratories, and other facilities. The plant has an ISO 9001-2000 ranking from AENOR México and produces eighteen million liters annually.

The hacienda is part of the tourism sector of the area's economy as well, with the Tequila Express train arriving at it and Amatitán from Guadalajara.

== Products ==
Herradura produces tequila and tequila-based beverages under the Herradura, Hacienda de Cristero, Grand Imperio, El Jimador, and New Mix names. Herradura brand tequilas are 100% blue agave. As an authentic tequila, bottles bear certification from the Mexican government. Herradura brands include Herradura Blanco (46% alcohol), Herradura Blanco Suave (40%), Herradura Reposado (40%), Herradura Antiguo (38%), Herradura Añejo (40%) and Selección Suprema (40%). The best-selling varieties are Reposado, Añejo, and Selección Suprema. Herradura introduced their first Reposado tequila in 1974 and the Extra Añejo Selección Suprema in 1995. Reposado is aged for eleven months in wood barrels. Selección Suprema is aged for 49 months in oak barrels. In 2012, the company redesigned the package of the Selección Suprema to reflect the traditional nature in which the extra-aged tequila is made.

Another important brand is el Jimador, launched in 1994 and named after those who harvest agave plants. el Jimador is 100% agave tequila. It is currently the best-selling tequila in Mexico, with a twelve percent market share.

New Mix is a canned tequila and grapefruit soda drink with five percent alcohol. It is also the best-selling product of its type in Mexico.

Herradura, in 2013 under the sub-label "Colección de la Casa," released in limited areas (Mexico, United States, El Salvador, and Australia), two new Reposado Tequilas partially aged in non-traditional barrels. One Aged in oak than in Port barrels and another partially aged in Cognac barrels as well as traditional oak.

== Promotions ==
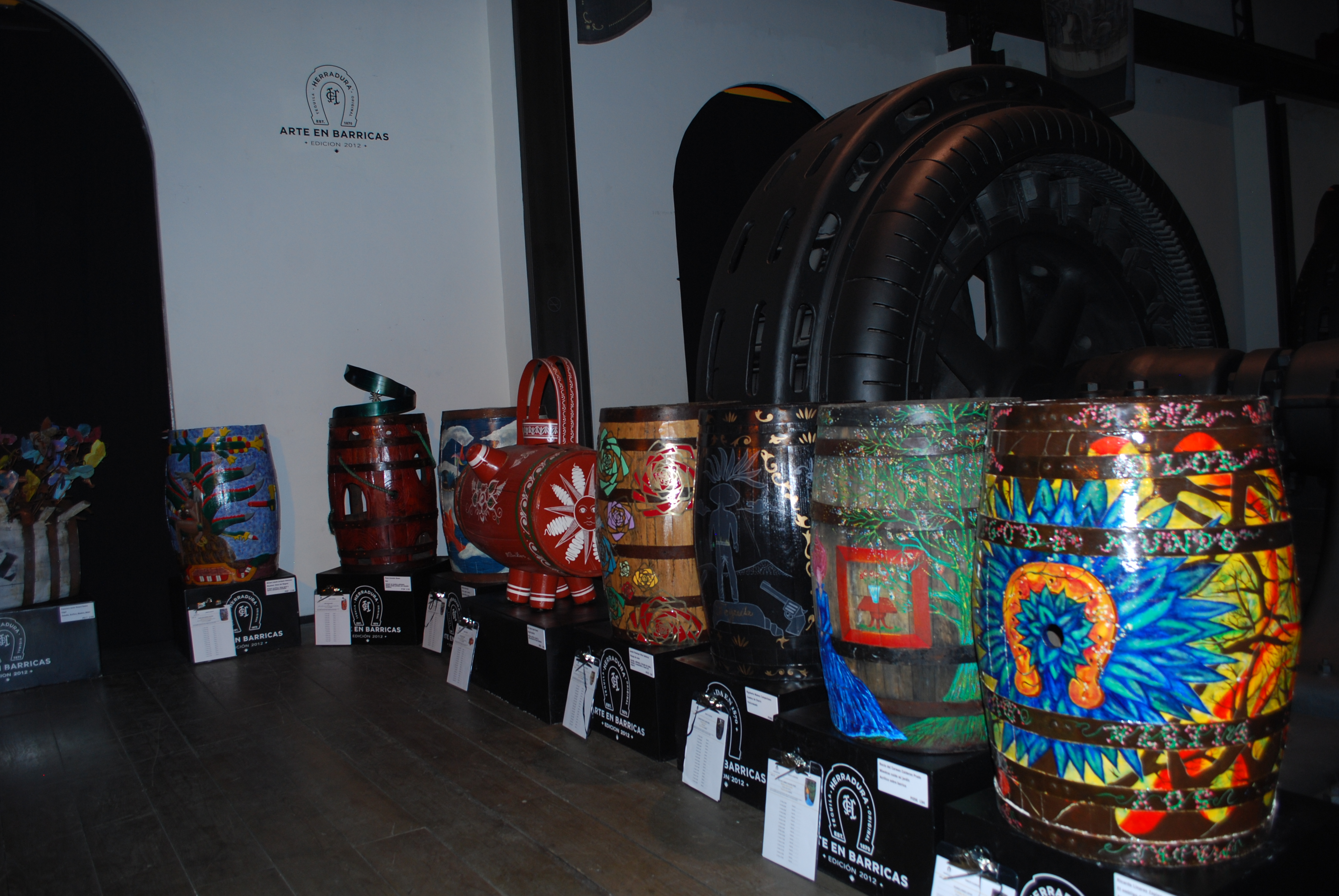
Tequila barrels converted into art as part of the Arte en Barricas auction in Mexico City

Since its acquisition by Brown-Forman, Herradura has had many promotional efforts in the United States and Mexico. Herradura was promoted as the "Official Tequila for the Kentucky Derby" in 2008. In 2010, it created a program called "Buy-the-Barrel" in the United States aimed at tequila connoisseurs to purchase an entire barrel of Reposado, which yields about 240 bottles. In 2011, the company began the "Arte en Barricas" (Art in Barrels) competition, inviting artists to use tequila barrels to create artwork. For its 142nd anniversary in 2012, the company invited 142 artists, forty-four of them well-known, such as José Luis Cuevas and Sebastián. The artists participated in Arte en Barricas for three prizes of 20,000 pesos and one prize of 10,000 pesos. The resulting works were displayed in various museum in the country then auctioned off with the proceeds going to four charities: Bécalos, the Museo de Arte Popular, Sólo por Ayudar and Hogar Cabañas.
