= Korbel Champagne Cellars =

Sparking wine producer, California, U.S.

Coordinates: 38°30′28″N 122°58′1″W

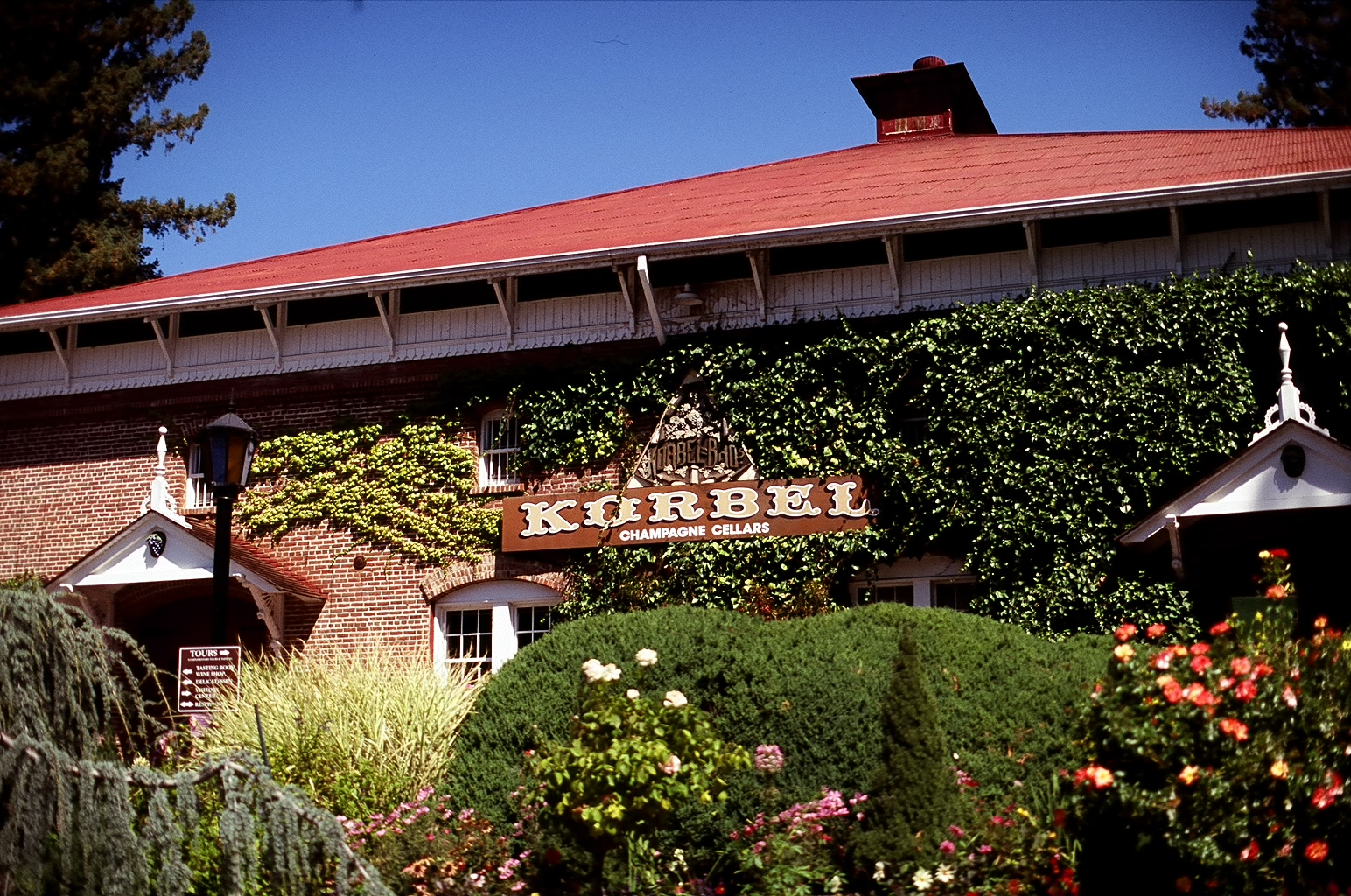
Korbel winery in Sonoma County.

Korbel Champagne Cellars is a winery based in Guerneville, California, United States. Since 1882, Korbel has primarily manufactured California sparkling wine, using the méthode champenoise process. In this process, sparkling wine is fermented inside the same bottle from which it is served. The company is a division of F. Korbel Brothers, and also makes brandy and still wine, and imports Prosecco from Italy.

F. Korbel & Bros. is a private company owned and operated by the Heck family. Brown-Forman has handled Korbel's marketing and sales since 1965.

== History ==
Korbel Champagne Cellars was founded in 1882 by Bohemian expatriate Francis Korbel and his two brothers, who also founded in 1876, the The Wasp, a weekly satire magazine in San Francisco. The first issue was published on August 5, 1876.

In 1893, during the Chicago World's Fair, the Korbel brothers were offering samples of their wine and brandy. Central European immigrants from Milwaukee took a liking to the Bohemian Korbel brothers' brandy, and brought it back to Wisconsin and began using it in cocktails, including the brandy old fashioned (an old fashioned made with brandy instead of whiskey, popular in Wisconsin. This story is probably false, however, and the more likely origin is due to the availability of brandy during post-WWII liquor shortages.

In 1954, it was purchased by brothers Paul and Adolf Heck. Adolf’s son, Gary, took over in 1982, and over time increased production from 150,000 to 1.6 million cases per year, making Korbel the 16th largest wine producer in the United States as of 2022.

== Use of "champagne" on labels ==
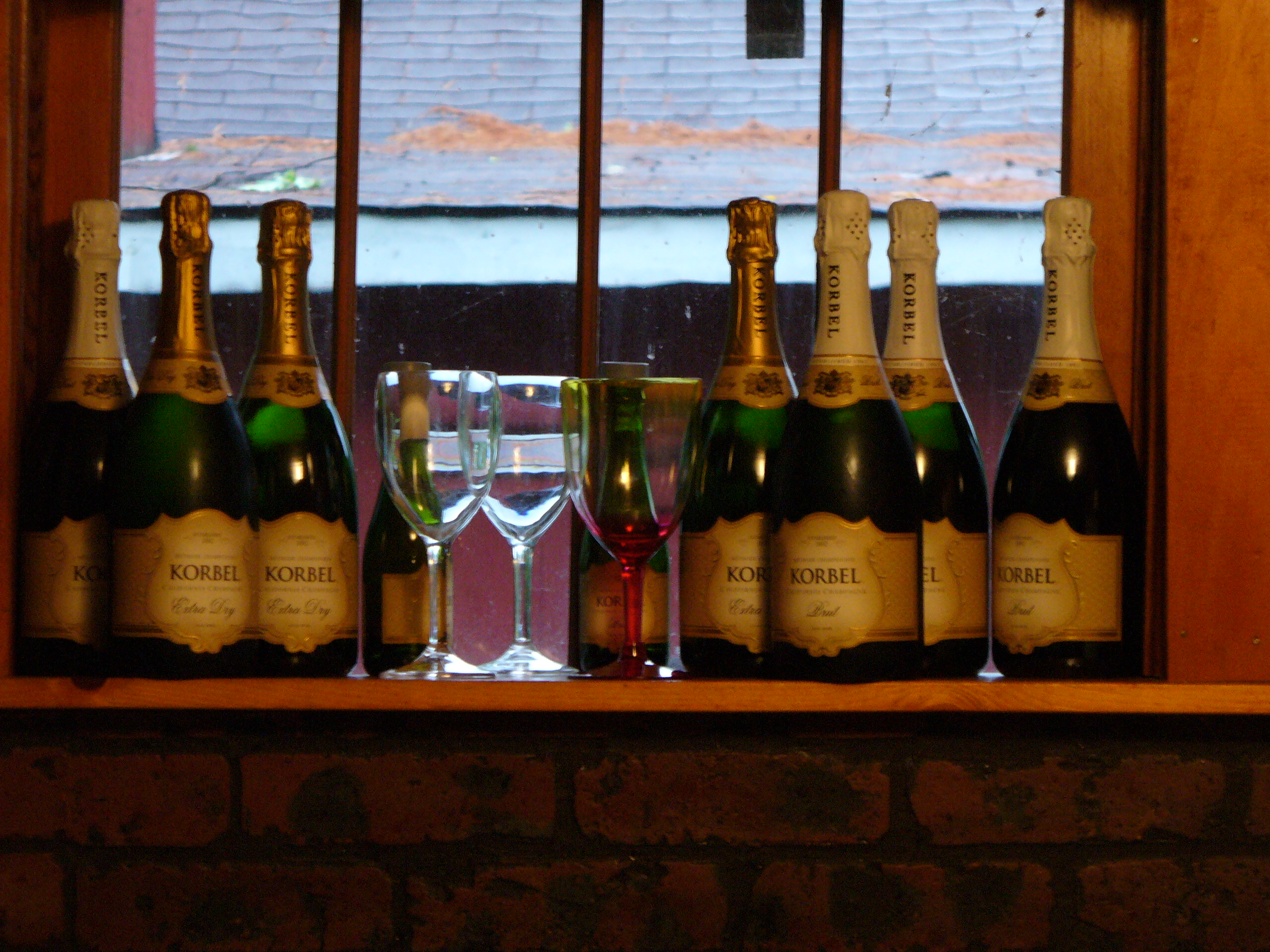
Korbel California sparkling wine.

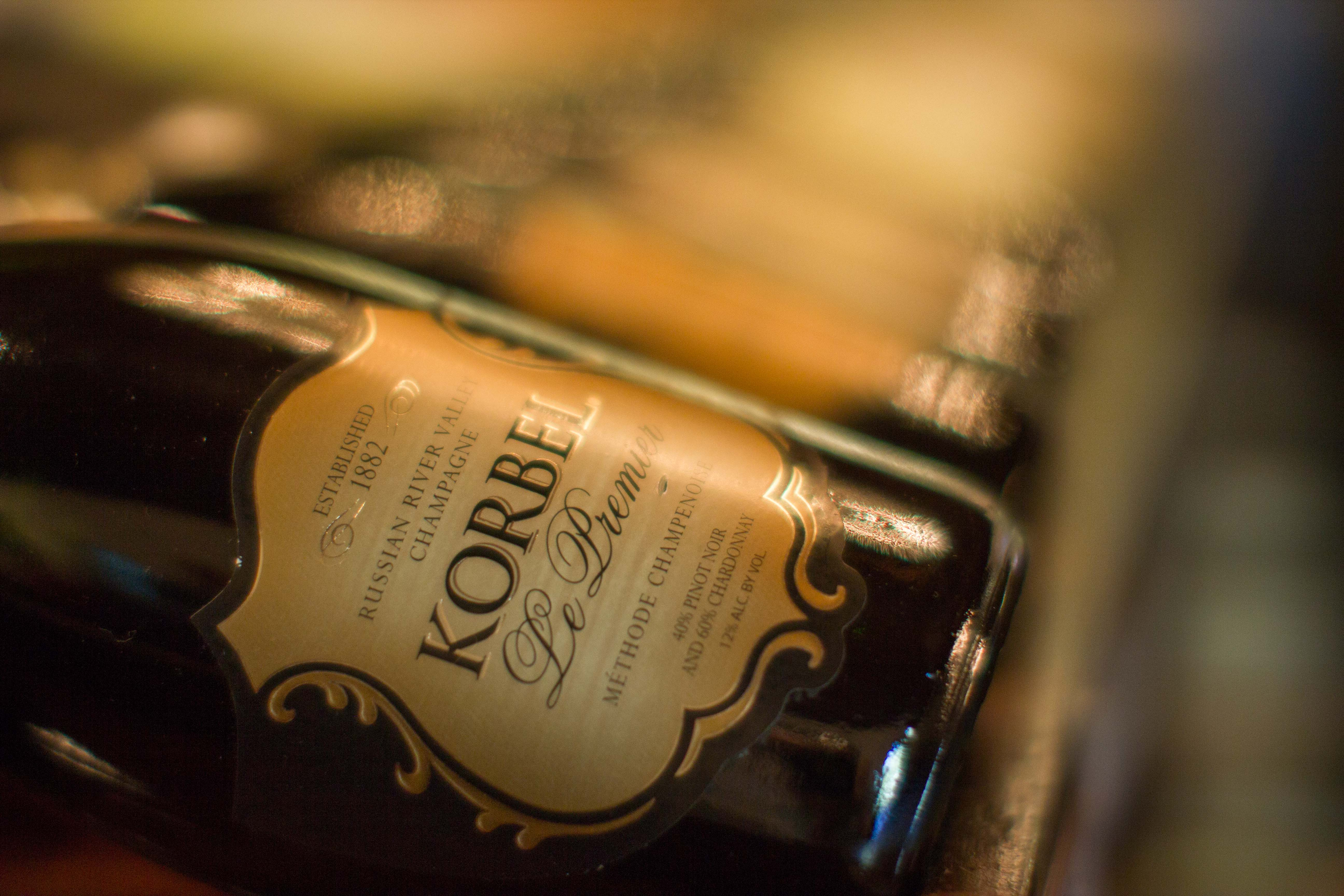
Korbel Champagne on a shelf at the Korbel Champagne Cellars

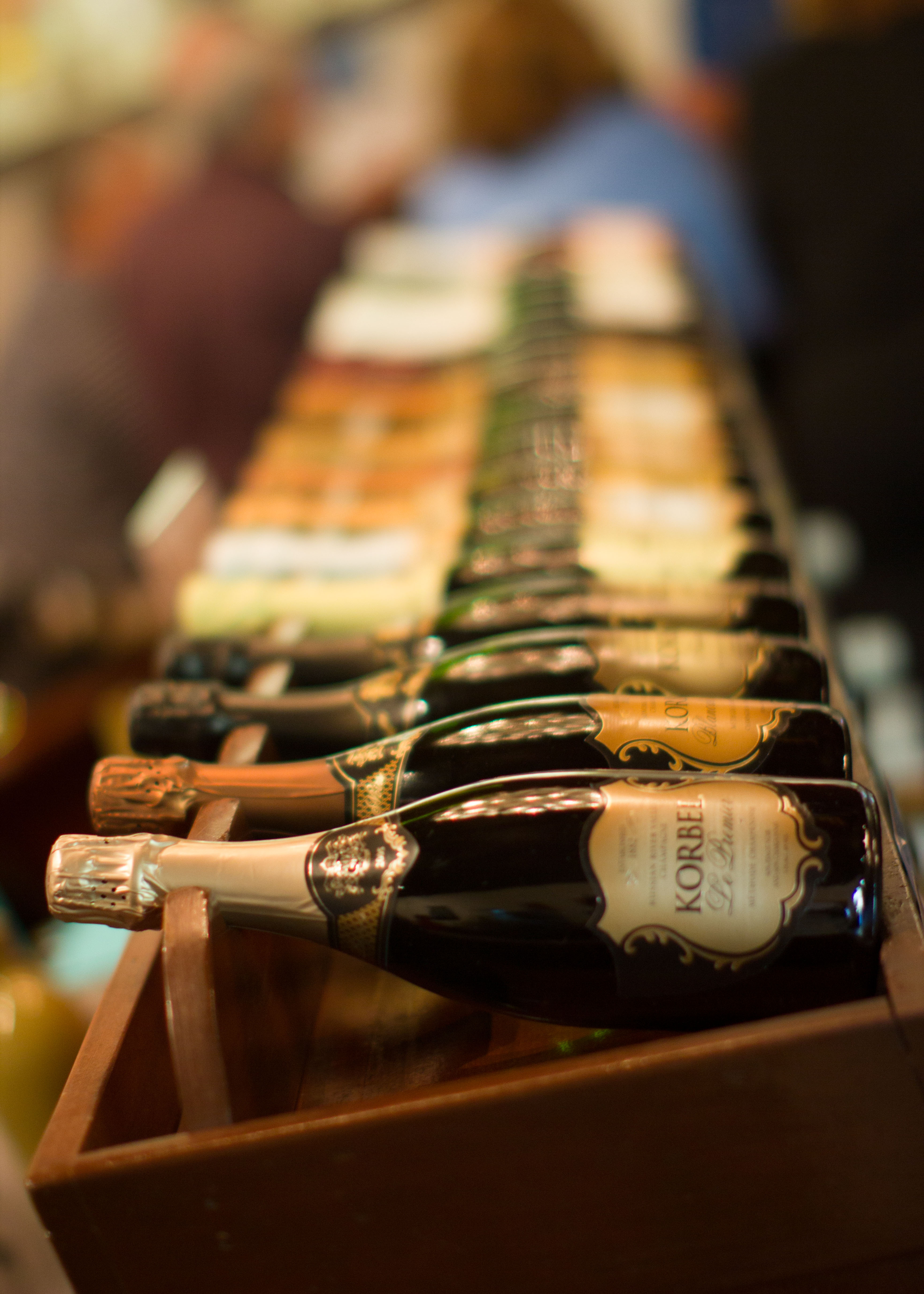
Korbel Champagne on a shelf at the Korbel Champagne Cellars

Korbel has followed regulations regarding use of the word “champagne” on wines made in and marketed in the United States, specifically regulations established by the U.S. Department of Treasury in the 1930s. These regulations allow U.S. producers to use names of geographical significance that also designate a class or type of wine. Such names – like champagne, sherry and port – are called semi-generics, and may be used on labels only in direct conjunction with an appropriate appellation of origin (place in the United States where the grapes were grown) and only on wines that conform to the standard of identity for that class or type. In 2006, all 27 EU-member countries, including France, signed the Bilateral U.S.-EC Trade Agreement on Wine reaffirming this right. This Agreement takes the laws of all involved nations into account, halts the development and use of new brands with semi-generic terms by U.S. wineries, while protecting U.S. producers – such as Korbel – who have made substantial long-term investments in trademarks, brand names and marketing of their products.

== Popularity ==
Korbel California sparkling wines have been served at 10 United States presidential inaugurations. It was also one of the wines served on January 20, 2009, at the Congressional Inaugural Luncheon for U.S. President Barack Obama.

Korbel's brandy has a particularly strong following in the state of Wisconsin, where over 50% of Korbel's brandy production is consumed.
