= Brown-Forman =

American spirit and wine producer and distributor

Brown-Forman Corporation
- Type: Public
- Traded as: NYSE: BF.A (Class A); NYSE: BF.B (Class B); S&P 500 component (BF.B); Russell 1000 component
- Industry: Drink industry
- Founded: 1870; 156 years ago
- Founder: George Garvin Brown
- Headquarters: Louisville, Kentucky, U.S.
- Area served: Worldwide
- Key people: Lawson E. Whiting (CEO); Campbell P. Brown (Chairman)
- Products: Distilled beverage; Wines
- Revenue: ▲US$5.37 billion (2025)
- Operating income: ▼US$1.13 billion (2025)
- Net income: ▼US$783 million (2025)
- Total assets: ▲US$8.17 billion (2025)
- Total equity: ▼US$3.52 billion (2025)
- Number of employees: 5,000 (2025)
- Website: brown-forman.com
- Footnotes; Financials as of April 30, 2025.

Brown-Forman Corporation is an American family-controlled publicly traded company, one of the largest in the spirits and wine business. Based in Louisville, Kentucky, it manufactures several well-known brands throughout the world, including Jack Daniel's, Old Forester, Woodford Reserve, GlenDronach, BenRiach, Glenglassaugh, Herradura, Korbel, and Chambord. Brown-Forman also owned Southern Comfort and Tuaca before selling them off in 2016.

As of fiscal 2024, Brown-Forman had gross sales of $5.32 billion and net sales of $4.178 billion. The roughly 40 members of the Brown family, cousins who are descendants of founder George Garvin Brown, control more than 70% of the voting shares and in 2026 had a net worth of $10.7 billion.

== History ==
=== Early years ===
According to Cengage, the company was founded in 1870 by George Garvin Brown, a young pharmaceuticals salesman in Louisville, and his partner John Forman.

Brown had the then-novel idea of selling top-grade whiskey in sealed glass bottles.

According to Forbes, the company was founded by Brown alone and he brought in his accountant as a partner in 1890 – changing the name to Brown-Forman and Company at that time in order to reflect the partnership. According to some sources, Brown's partner's given name was George (rather than John) and he died in 1901, and Brown purchased his stock.

Forman was not sure the idea of selling whiskey in glass bottles would be a good business strategy in the long term, and he sold his interest to Brown and Brown's family in 1902.

Yet another slightly different story is told in a source published in 1905, saying Brown began in J. T. S. Brown & Bro., which reorganized as Brown, Chambers & Co. in 1873, then Chambers & Brown a year later, then Brown, Thompson & Co. six years later, and then, upon the withdrawal of Thompson, became Brown, Forman & Co. in 1889, and then after Forman's death in 1901, became the Brown-Forman Company.

=== 20th century ===
In 1904, Owsley Brown, George Garvin Brown's son, came into the business. When George Garvin Brown died at the age of 70 in 1917, his son, Owsley, took over as president of Brown-Forman.

Despite the temperance movement in America, the company prospered.

With the onset of Prohibition in the United States, in 1920, Brown-Forman was granted one of six national licenses to produce medicinal whiskey.

=== 21st century ===
In 2004, Brown-Forman launched the first brand of low-carb wine in the USA. In 2005, the company sold its Lenox division (one of the oldest and most famous manufacturers of fine china in the United States), which had been acquired in 1983, to Department 56 for $160 million. The income generated by the sale was distributed to the shareholders in the form of a one time special dividend.

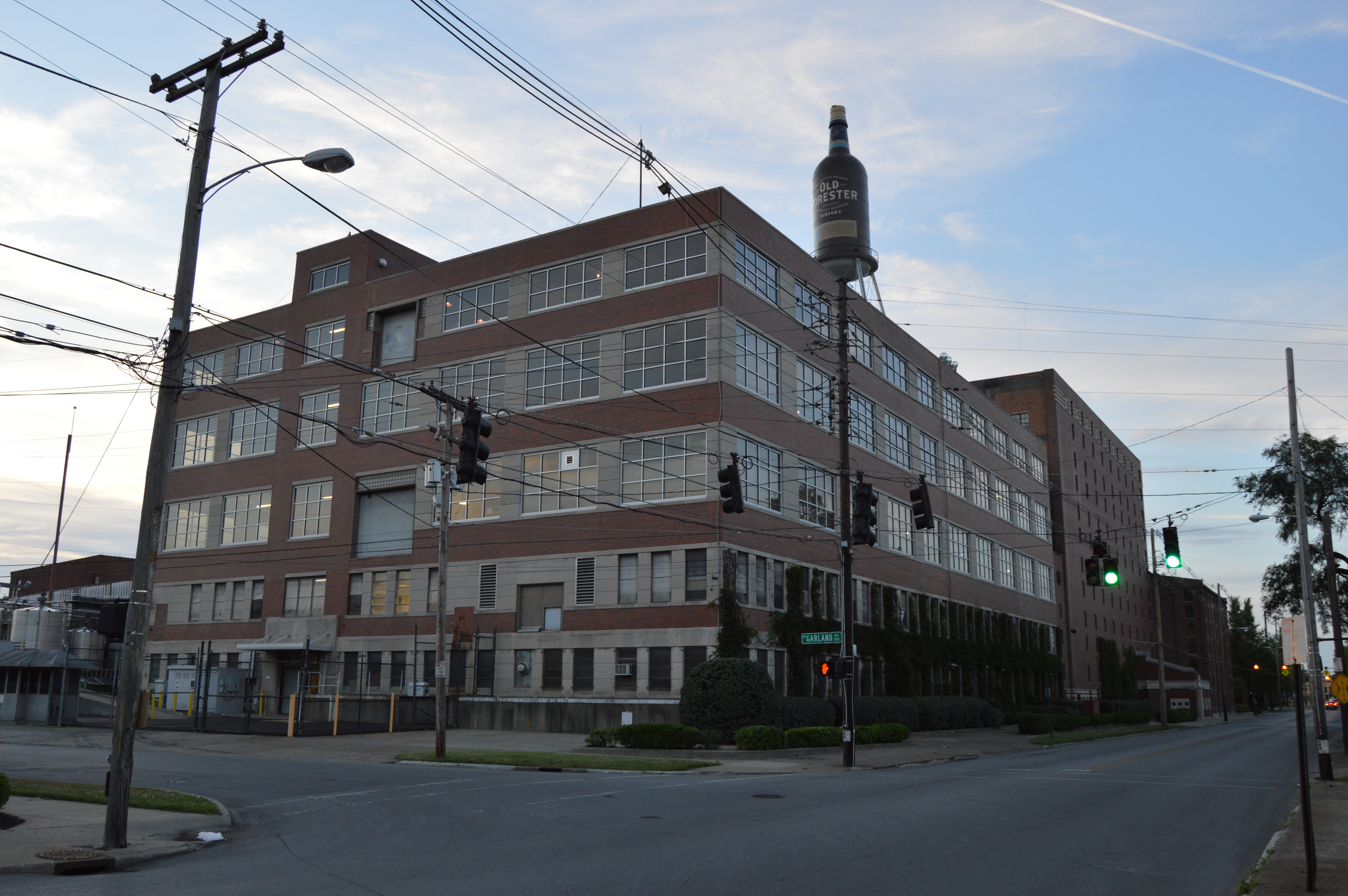
Part of the company's Louisville complex

In 2006, the company acquired the Chambord liqueur brand (a super-premium black raspberry liqueur produced in France) for $255 million.

In 2007, the company acquired Tequila Herradura, a Mexican company that produces the Casa Herradura tequila brand (a super-premium tequila produced in Mexico) for $776 million, while it also sold its Hartman Luggage division (one of the leaders in the travel goods industry and originally a subdivision of Lenox), to Clarion Capitol Partners. One year later in 2008, it sold the Bolla and Fontana Candida Italian wine brands to Gruppo Italiano Vini (GIV). The terms of neither sale were disclosed.

In 2011, the company sold Fetzer Vineyards and associated brands to Chilean wine producer Viña Concha y Toro S.A. for $238 million.

In 2016, the Southern Comfort and Tuaca brands were sold to Sazerac Company for $543 million.

In 2016, Brown-Forman also reached an agreement to purchase the BenRiach Distillery Company Limited for approximately £285 million. The purchase brought BenRiach, GlenDronach and Glenglassaugh to Brown-Forman's portfolio.

In 2020, the company sold the Early Times and Canadian Mist brands to Sazerac Company.

In January 2021, Chairman George Garvin Brown IV retired. His brother, Campbell P. Brown, was selected to replace him.

In November 2023, Brown-Forman announced the sale of Finlandia vodka to The Coca-Cola Hellenic Bottling Company for $220 million.

In January 2025, the company announced that it planned to lay off 12 percent of its global workforce of 5,400 people.

== Stock ==
Brown-Forman has two classes of common stock, both of which are traded publicly on the New York Stock Exchange. The Class A shares carry voting privileges and are thinly traded due to control by the Brown family, while the Class B shares are non-voting stock.

== Brands ==
Brown-Forman beverage brands include:

- American whiskey:
  - Kentucky straight bourbon whiskey: Old Forester (the company's 1870 founding brand), Woodford Reserve
  - Tennessee whiskey: Jack Daniel's
- Canadian whisky: Collingwood
- Irish whiskey: Slane
- Scotch whisky:
  - Single malt Scotch whisky: BenRiach, GlenDronach, Glenglassaugh
- Gin: Fords
- Liqueur: Chambord
- Ready-to-drink coolers: Little Black Dress
- Tequila: Don Eduardo, El Jimador, Herradura, Pepe Lopez
- Wine: Korbel (distributed), Sonoma-Cutrer Wines

== Environmental impact ==
In 2009, Newsweek magazine ranked Brown-Forman in their "Green Rankings" which examines 500 of the largest corporations on their environmental track record. Brown-Forman was ranked 63rd out of 500 overall, and was ranked third in the food and beverage industry sector.

== Illegal subsidization in China ==
In 2011, Brown-Forman was accused of illegally subsidizing its distributors in China, and subsequently delaying payment to them as agreed under contract. The Shanghai Administration for Industry and Commerce fined Brown-Forman 2 million renminbi (US$320,000) for illegal subsidization.

== See also ==
- List of major employers in Louisville, Kentucky
- List of historic whisky distilleries
