= Old Forester =

First bottled bourbon

Old Forester Straight Bourbon Whisky
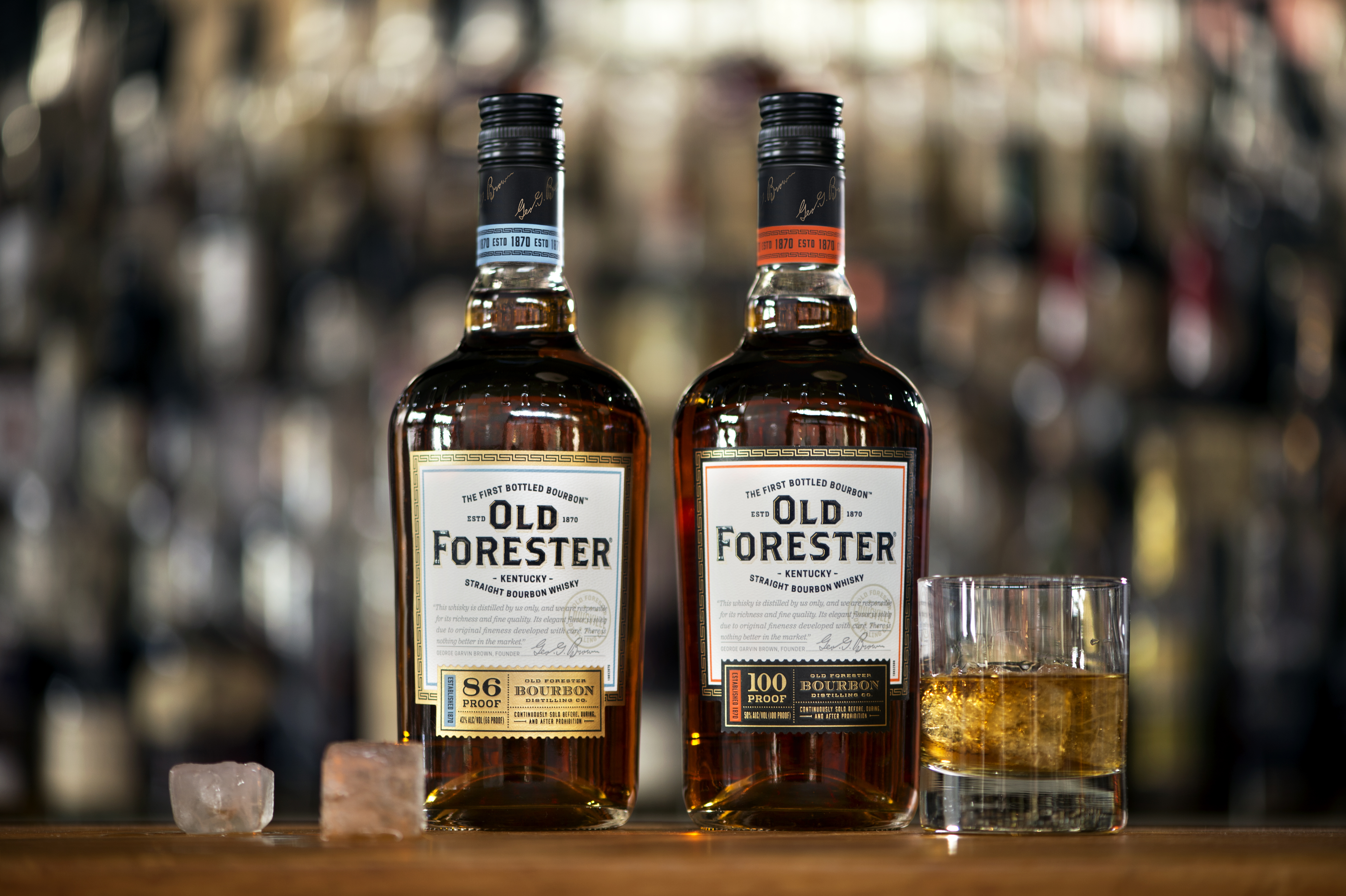
- Liter glass bottles of Old Forester Classic 86 and Old Forester Signature 100
- Type: Bourbon whisky
- Manufacturer: Brown–Forman
- Origin: Louisville, Kentucky, United States
- Alcohol by volume: 30.00% – 60.00%
- Proof (US): 60–120

Old Forester is a brand of Kentucky straight bourbon whisky produced by the Brown–Forman Corporation. It has been on the market continuously for longer than any other bourbon (approximately 150 years as of 2020), and was the first bourbon sold exclusively in sealed bottles. It was first bottled and marketed in 1870 by the former pharmaceutical salesman turned bourbon-merchant George Garvin Brown – the founder of the Brown–Forman Corporation (whose descendants still manage the company). During the Prohibition period from 1920 to 1933, Brown–Forman received one of only six licenses authorizing lawful production (for medicinal purposes).

Old Forester is produced under the supervision of Master Distiller Chris Morris (as of 2006) at the Brown–Forman distillery in Shively, Kentucky, (which is located directly adjacent to the pre-merger southwest boundary of Louisville) and at Old Forester Distilling Co. (located in Downtown Louisville on historic Whisky Row in the original building used from 1882 to 1919) using a mash bill of 72% corn (maize), 18% rye, and 10% malted barley (the same mash bill used for Woodford Reserve). Its mash bill has been described as "pretty standard" and "richer in rye than most bourbons".

== History ==
When the product was introduced in 1870, bottles of Old Forester were sealed as a way to guard against adulteration and substitution of the contents, and were initially sold in pharmacies as a medicinal product. The innovation introduced with Old Forester was not that it was available in such bottles, but that it was the first bourbon to be exclusively available in this fashion – providing a greater level of assurance of quality for that brand relative to other products in the market. This innovation was enabled and further fueled by emerging advances in the mass production of glass bottles, such as those soon to be developed by Michael Owens. The sealed bottle approach was popular with doctors and with the pharmacists that sold the product, and their approval was touted in advertisements of the product to the general public.

Originally, the product name was spelled "Old Forrester", with a double "r". The product is reported to have been named after a physician Dr. William Forrester who endorsed its consumption, and the renaming is conjectured to have been a way to avoid direct reference to the physician's name. Originally formed by George Garvin Brown and his half-brother John Thompson Street Brown (J.T.S. Brown, who would also later figure into the history of the Four Roses Distillery and inspire the naming of a brand of bourbon produced by Heaven Hill Distilleries), the company that produces the product was originally registered as J. T. S. Brown & Bro., and became Brown–Forman in 1902 after several partnerships and name changes involving partners James Thompson (who was also involved in the Glenmore Distillery Company and created the Old Thompson brand), Henry Chambers, and George Forman. George Garvin Brown became sole owner by 1902, and although Brown–Forman is now a publicly traded company on the New York Stock Exchange, the Brown family still controls more than 70% of the voting shares (as of 2010).

To produce his Old Forester product, Brown would initially purchase whiskies from distillers such as John McDougal Atherton and Ben Mattingly, and blend them together. In 1902, he then purchased Mattingly's distillery in the town of Saint Mary in Marion County, Kentucky.

Until Prohibition in the United States began in 1920, Old Forester was the leading brand produced by Brown's company. The company was granted one of the few government licenses to produce medical whiskey, at which time the product became a straight bourbon at 100 proof (previously it had been a blended product).

Since then, other brands were acquired by the company, such as Early Times (purchased in 1923, which became America's best-selling bourbon and maintained high sales for 30 years), and Jack Daniel's (purchased in 1956 and as of 2007 the best-selling whiskey of any kind in the world), have become its leading products.

Every year since 2002, Old Forester releases a Birthday Bourbon expression, made available exclusively through a national sweepstakes. The winners are chosen on September 2, to commemorate the day of Brown's birth.

In August 2016, Old Forester announced the release of its 115-proof "1920 Prohibition Style Bourbon". In 2021, the company announced its latest expression, known as the 117 Series, or the "High Angels' Share".

== Products ==
Bottling variations include:

- Old Forester Classic (86 proof / 43% abv)
- Old Forester Signature (100 proof / 50% abv)
- Old Forester Mint Julep (Official drink of the Kentucky Derby – Cocktail Ready to Drink – 60 proof / 30% abv)
- Old Forester Birthday Bourbon (introduced in 2002, 96 proof / 48% abv in 2023 bottling)
- Old Forester President's Choice Bourbon (will vary in the traditional range of 110–120 proof / 55%–60% abv, typically aged eight years)
- the "Whisky Row Series"
  - Old Forester 1870 – Original Batch
  - Old Forester 1897 – Bottled in Bond
  - Old Forester 1910 – Old Fine Whisky
  - Old Forester 1920 – Prohibition Style
- Old Forester Statesman (95 proof / 47.5% abv – inspired by the dynamic characters in the film, Kingsman: The Golden Circle).

== Awards, recognitions, and reviews ==
Some awards and recognitions for the brand include the following:

- Old Forester Birthday Bourbon (95 proof / 47.5% abv in 2010 bottling, brand variation introduced in 2002):
  - San Francisco World Spirits Competition: "best bourbon" award 2012, "double gold medal" award 2003 and 2012, "gold medal" award 2006 and 2007, "silver medal" award 2005.
  - Rating in 90+ Percentile—Best Whiskies indicated by Proof66.com
  - "Best bourbon aged under 10 years" in Jim Murray's Whisky Bible 2006 (ISBN 1-84442-550-9): 2005
  - Rated 91 on a 100-point scale (with the range 90–94 being referred to as "Outstanding! One of the best for its style. Distinctive.") by John Hansell of Malt Advocate Magazine: 2010
  - Named an "American Whiskey of the Year" at Malt Advocate WhiskyFest New York 2007
  - Other recognitions by USA Today, Whisky Magazine, Spirit Journal, and Santé
- Old Forester Signature (100 proof / 50% abv):
  - San Francisco World Spirits Competition: "gold medal" award 2003, "double gold medal" award 2004 and 2012, "best bourbon of show" award 2004.

Wine Enthusiast described Old Forester as having "a very spicy nose that has some sweet vanilla peeking through".

Food critic Morgan Murphy said "The sweet-and-sour aroma will be the first thing you notice about this venerable Kentucky classic."
