= Woodford Reserve =

Brand of Kentucky bourbon whiskey

- Type: Bourbon whiskey
- Manufacturer: Brown-Forman
- Origin: Kentucky, United States
- Alcohol by volume: 45.20%
- Proof (US): 90.4
- Related products: Brown-Forman
- Website: woodfordreserve.com

- Labrot and Graham's Old Oscar Pepper Distillery
- U.S. National Register of Historic Places
- U.S. National Historic Landmark District
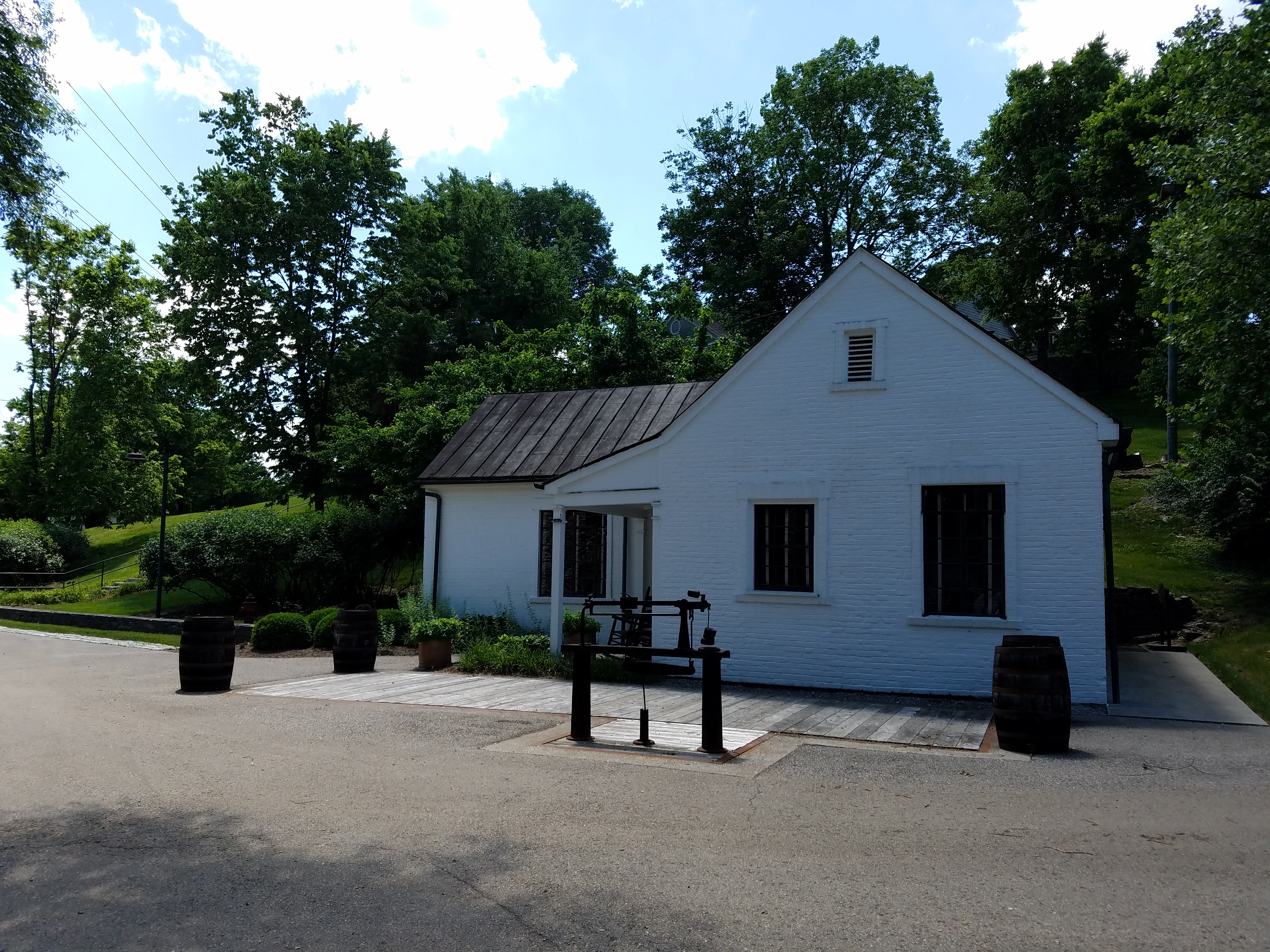

- Location within Kentucky Location within the United States
- Interactive map showing the location of Labrot and Graham's Old Oscar Pepper Distillery
- Nearest city: Versailles, Kentucky
- Coordinates: 38°6′46″N 84°48′43″W
- Area: 72 acres (29 ha) (landmarked area)
- Built: 1838
- Architectural style: Mid 19th Century Revival, Late Victorian, Late 19th and 20th Century Revivals
- NRHP reference No.: 95001272

Significant dates
- Added to NRHP: November 7, 1995
- Designated NHLD: May 15, 2000

Woodford Reserve is a brand of premium small batch Kentucky straight bourbon whiskey produced at Woodford Reserve Distillery, in Woodford County, Kentucky, by the Brown-Forman Corporation.

It is made from a mixture of copper pot still spirits produced at the company's Woodford Reserve Distillery, and column still spirits from the Brown Forman Distillery in Shively, Kentucky. Each 45.2% alcohol by volume (90.4 US Proof) bottle bears a unique batch and bottle number. The brand was introduced in 1996. Domestic sales of Woodford Reserve surpassed one million cases in 2021.

== History ==
The Woodford Reserve Distillery, formerly known as the Old Oscar Pepper Distillery and later the Labrot & Graham Distillery, is approximately eight miles from the town of Versailles in north-central Kentucky, off U.S. Route 60 between Interstate 64 and Versailles.

Distilling began on the site of the current day distillery in 1812. Although the site has not been continuously operational as a distillery since, the main structure, built in 1838, stands as one of the oldest distilleries in Kentucky. It is listed on the National Register of Historic Places, and is designated as a National Historic Landmark for its well-preserved distillery architecture and its role in the development of the bourbon industry.

Originally established by Elijah Pepper, the distillery was passed on to his son and known as the Oscar Pepper Distillery when James C. Crow worked there in the mid-19th century. During this time Crow undertook a series of activities that improved and codified the understanding and quality of key bourbon-making processes such as sour mash fermentation, pot still distillation and barrel maturation. After Oscar Pepper died in 1867 the distillery was passed to his son James E. Pepper. The Pepper family sold the property to Leopold Labrot and James Graham in 1878, who owned and operated it (except during Prohibition) until it was sold to the Brown-Forman Corporation in 1941. Brown-Forman operated it until the late 1960s, then sold the property and its accompanying acreage to a local farmer. Brown-Forman re-purchased the property in 1993, refurbished it, and brought it back into operation. The Woodford Reserve brand was introduced to the market in 1996. The distillery was renamed Woodford Reserve Distillery in 2004.

The distillery produces: Woodford Reserve Bourbon, Woodford Reserve Double Oaked, Woodford Reserve Straight Rye Whiskey, Woodford Reserve Straight Malt Whiskey, and Woodford Reserve Wheat Whiskey. It also distills some limited edition releases, including Woodford Reserve Master's Collection, Woodford Reserve Master's Collection Batch Proof, a Kentucky-only Distillery Series, and a special commemorative bottle it releases annually in conjunction with its official sponsorship of the Kentucky Derby.

In 2025, Woodford Reserve released Chocolate Whisper Redux Bourbon, marking the brand's highest-proof bourbon to date at 139.4 proof (69.7% ABV), as a limited-time release.

=== Master Distiller ===
Up until 2023, the Master Distiller of Woodford Reserve was Chris Morris (a position he held from 2003) and the Assistant Master Distiller was Elizabeth McCall.

In 2023, Elizabeth McCall was named Master Distiller of Woodford Reserve with Chris Morris to serve as Master Distiller Emeritus. McCall had been with Brown-Forman since 2009, and was previously the Woodford Reserve Assistant Master Distiller.

=== Kash Patel imprint ===
The Federal Bureau of Investigation director, Kash Patel, has a branded imprint of Woodford Reserve's bourbon, engraved with his name. A spokesperson for the company told The Atlantic that "Consumers who purchase Woodford Reserve occasionally have images and messages engraved on the bottle".

== Reviews and accolades ==
International Spirit ratings organizations and liquor review bodies have generally given Woodford Reserve solid scores. At the San Francisco World Spirits Competition, Woodford Reserve's best performances have been in 2005 and 2013, winning a double gold medal each time. It has also won gold (2006–2007, 2011–2012) and silver (2008, 2010) medals at this annual event. The Beverage Testing Institute has given the Reserve scores of between 90 and 91 and Wine Enthusiast awarded it a 90–95 point rating. Spirits ratings aggregator proof66.com, which averages scores from the San Francisco World Spirits Competition, Wine Enthusiast, the Beverage Testing Institute, and others, had Woodford Reserve ranked in its highest ("Tier 1") scoring category until 2016, and subsequently had it ranked as "Tier 2".

== Union busting ==
In April 2024, a judge with the National Labor Relations Board found that Woodford Reserve had engaged in unfair labor practices in violation of the National Labor Relations Act by timing changes in merit pay and vacation policies, as well as handing out bottles of whiskey to workers, in order to influence the outcome of a unionization vote at its distillery in Versailles, Kentucky.

== See also ==
- List of bourbon brands
- List of historic whisky distilleries
