= List of Kentucky companies =

This is a list of Kentucky companies which includes notable companies that are headquartered in Kentucky, or were previously headquartered in Kentucky.

== Companies based in Kentucky ==
=== 0–9 ===
- 21c Museum Hotels

=== A ===
- A&W Restaurants
- Alltech
- Ashland Inc.
- Atlas Machine and Supply, Inc.
- Atria Senior Living

=== B ===
- Baptist Heath
- Bearno's
- Big Ass Fans
- Block Starz Music
- Blood-Horse Publications
- Bluegrass Brewing Company
- Broadbent's
- Brown–Forman
- Buffalo Trace Distillery

=== C ===
- C.I.Agent Solutions
- CafePress
- Caldwell Tanks
- Columbia Sussex
- Commonwealth Credit Union
- Crosley Radio

=== D ===
- D.D. Williamson
- Dippin' Dots
- Doe-Anderson Inc.

=== E ===
- Ebonite International
- Equix
- Exstream Software

=== F ===
- Fazoli's
- Florida Tile
- Forcht Group of Kentucky
- Four Roses
- Fruit of the Loom

=== G ===
- GE Appliances
- General Cable
- Gilliam Candy Company
- Graf Brothers Flooring and Lumber

=== H ===
- Heaven Hill
- Heine Brothers'
- Hillerich & Bradsby
- Hilliard Lyons
- Hitcents
- Holley Performance Products
- Houchens Industries
- Humana

=== I ===
- i-wireless
- Intech Contracting

=== J ===
- Jif
- Jim Beam
- Joseph & Joseph
- Jr. Food Stores

=== K ===
- Kentucky Peerless Distilling Company
- KFC
- Kindred Healthcare
- Kinetic theTechnologyAgency
- Kona Ice

=== L ===
- Lexmark
- LG&E and KU Energy
- Lincoln Industries
- Long John Silver's
- Louisville Bats
- Louisville Gas & Electric
- Louisville Stoneware
- Louisville Water Company
- Luckett & Farley

=== M ===
- Maker's Mark
- Mammoth Resource Partners
- Marmon-Herrington
- Mayfield Consumer Products

=== N ===
- Naval Ordnance Station Louisville
- New Kolb Aircraft
- Norton Healthcare

=== O ===
- Ohio Valley Wrestling
- Ouibox

=== P ===
- Papa John's Pizza
- Paxton Media Group
- PharMerica
- Presbyterian Publishing Corporation
- Purple House Press

=== R ===
- R.J. Corman Railroad Group
- Republic Bank & Trust Company

=== S ===
- Safetran
- Sargent & Greenleaf
- Shay's Bones and Biscuits (2004), defunct
- SHPS
- SITEX Corporation
- SonaBLAST! Records
- Stewart Iron Works
- Stites & Harbison

=== T ===
- Tempur-Pedic
- Texas Roadhouse
- Themeparks LLC
- Thorntons Inc.
- Town Branch
- Tumbleweed Tex Mex Grill & Margarita Bar

=== U ===
- Unicomp
- United States Playing Card Company
- UPS Airlines

=== W ===
- Waterfront Development Corporation
- Westminster John Knox Press
- Wild Flavors
- Wild Turkey
- Willett Distillery
- Woodford Reserve
- WTII Records
- Wyatt, Tarrant & Combs

=== Y ===
- Yum! Brands

=== Z ===
- ZFX Inc.
- ZOOperstars!

== Companies formerly based in Kentucky ==
=== B ===
- Brown & Williamson

=== C ===
- Camping World
- Comair

=== G ===
- GameZnFlix

=== J ===
- J. Peterman Company

=== L ===
- Local TV LLC
- Louis Trauth Dairy

=== O ===
- Omnicare

=== R ===
- Royal Photo Company

=== S ===
- Stonestreet One

=== T ===
- Thiel Audio
- Toyota Motor Engineering & Manufacturing North America

=== U ===
- U.S. Cavalry Store

== See also ==
- List of companies in Greater Cincinnati
