= CCU =

CCU may refer to:

== Hospitals ==
- Coronary care unit, a hospital wing meant for monitoring patients with heart problems
- Critical care unit, in a hospital (UK terminology), similar to intensive care unit (ICU) in other countries; or, a unit that provides higher care than an ICU does

== Technology ==
- Camera control unit, for a video camera
- Carbon capture and utilization, capturing CO_{2} emissions and using the captured gas for a practical purpose
- Customer Configuration Updating, a software development method
- Concurrent users, number of users using the application simultaneously

== Universities ==
- California Coast University, a university in Santa Ana, California, USA
- Chaudhary Charan Singh University, a University in Meerut, Uttar Pradesh [UP], India
- Chinese Culture University, a university in Taipei, Taiwan
- Cincinnati Christian University, a university in Cincinnati, Ohio, USA
- Coastal Carolina University, a university in Horry County, South Carolina, USA
- Colorado Christian University, a liberal arts college in Lakewood, Colorado, USA
- National Chung Cheng University, a public university in Chiayi, Taiwan
- National Chengchi University, a public university in Taipei, Taiwan

== Organizations ==
- Cambodian Confederation of Unions, a Cambodian national trade union centre
- Compañía de las Cervecerías Unidas, a Chilean drinks and beer company
- Common Cold Unit
- Confederation of Canadian Unions, a labour union central in Canada
- Commonwealth Credit Union, a financial institution in Kentucky
- Correctional Custody Unit, United States Marine Corps

== Other uses ==
- Netaji Subhash Chandra Bose International Airport (Kolkata Airport, IATA code CCU), formerly known as Dum Dum Airport, located in Dum Dum, India
- CCU, a codon for the amino acid proline
