= Secondary containment =

Secondary containment may refer to:

- Containment building, a type of building used with nuclear reactors
- Secondary spill containment, a technique for dealing with hazardous spills
- A possible requirement for chemical tanks
