= Heaven Hill =

American distillery

Coordinates: 38.2448°N 85.7815°W

Heaven Hill Distilleries, Inc
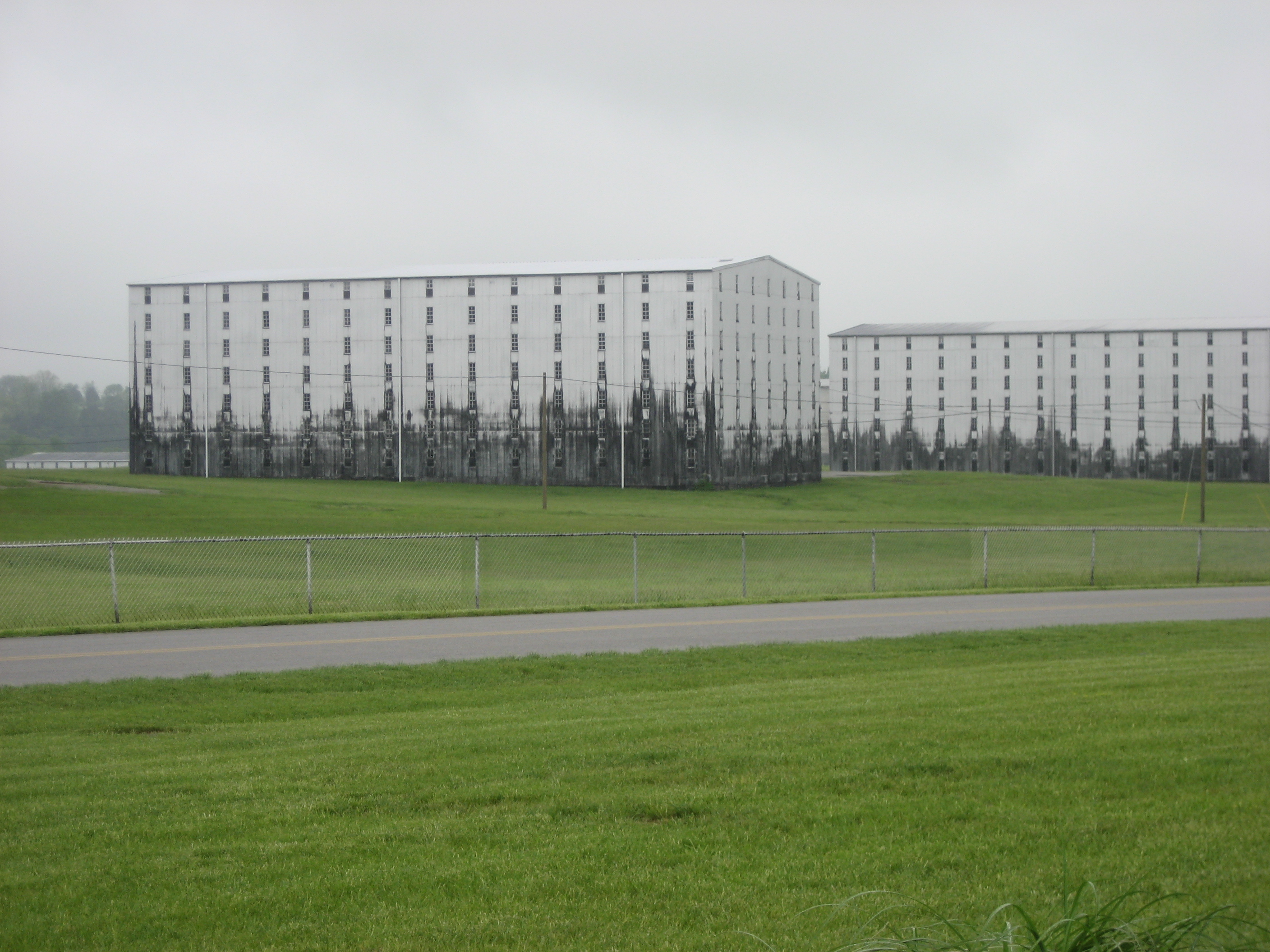
- Type: Private
- Industry: Drink industry
- Founded: 1935
- Founder: Shapira family
- Headquarters: Bardstown, Kentucky, United States
- Key people: Max Shapira, Kate Latts, Allan Latts

Heaven Hill
- Type: Bourbon whiskey
- Manufacturer: Heaven Hill
- Origin: Kentucky, United States
- Introduced: 1935
- Alcohol by volume: 40%
- Proof (US): 80
- Related products: Heaven Hill
- Website: heavenhill.com

Heaven Hill Distilleries, Inc. is a private family-owned and operated American distillery, founded in 1935 and headquartered in Bardstown, Kentucky. It produces and markets Heaven Hill Kentucky straight bourbon whiskey and other brands of bourbon, along with a variety of other distilled spirits, brandies, and cordials.

Its current distillery facility, called the Heaven Hill Bernheim distillery, is in Louisville, Kentucky. It is the seventh-largest alcoholic beverage supplier in the United States, the second-largest holder of bourbon whiskey inventory in the world, and the largest independent family-owned and operated producer and marketer of distilled spirits in the United States. It is also the only remaining large family-owned distillery headquartered in Kentucky, with Brown-Forman Corporation being publicly traded and family-owned Sazerac Company headquartered in Louisiana.

== History ==
Heaven Hill was founded by several investors shortly after the repeal of Prohibition in 1935, including a prominent distiller, Joseph L. Beam, and a member of the Shapira family. As the company developed, the five brothers of the Shapira family bought out the other investors. Joe Beam remained as Master Distiller, along with his youngest son, Harry. Descendants of the Shapira brothers own and operate the company today.

All of the Master Distillers at Heaven Hill since its founding have been members of the Beam family. The original Master Distiller was Joseph L. Beam, Jim Beam's first cousin. He was followed by his son, Harry, who was followed by Earl Beam, the son of Jim Beam's brother, Park. Earl Beam was succeeded by the current Master Distillers, Parker Beam and his son, Craig Beam.

The original name was "Old Heavenhill Springs" distillery. The company was founded as a bourbon distillery, with a model focused on providing bulk whiskey for third parties on a basis of futures (a buyer would purchase fresh whiskey, to be held in Heaven Hill's warehouses until the buyer paid the government tax to have it released). It also focused on its flagship bourbon labels, Evan Williams and Elijah Craig. In the past two decades the company has expanded its portfolio, acquiring brands or obtaining import rights for gins, malt whiskey, vodkas, and other drinks.

On November 7, 1996, Heaven Hill's production plant (registered plant DSP-KY-31) was almost completely destroyed by fire. The fire started in an aging warehouse and spread to other buildings and vehicles. 90,000 barrels (approximately 7.7 million gallons) of flammable bourbon were consumed. A "river of fire" flowed from the warehouses.

The company survived the next several years through the provision of production capacity by its fellow local bourbon labels, Brown–Forman and Jim Beam, until its purchase and adaptation of the Bernheim distillery in Louisville (registered plant DSP-KY-1) from Diageo in 1999. While fermenting, mashing, and distilling occurs at the new distillery, aging, bottling, and shipping still occur in Bardstown.

With the 2003 acquisition of distribution rights to Hpnotiq, Heaven Hill greatly expanded their product base beyond bourbon. Hpnotiq is now the fourth-highest-selling imported liqueur in the US. While bourbon is still its main focus, Heaven Hill now distributes a wide variety of different products.

The Heaven Hill company strongly emphasizes the history and traditions of bourbon in its public relations, highlighting the company's location in the historical home of bourbon-making and its status as the only such company still under local ownership. In 2004, the Heaven Hill Distilleries Bourbon Heritage Center was opened on the old distillery grounds, providing historical exhibits and guided tours of the plant. The company also hosts the annual Kentucky Bourbon Festival, and several of the company's brands are named after famous local distillers.

Since 2010, Heaven Hill has invested more than $100 million in distillery expansions, warehouse construction, and bourbon tourism. In November 2018, Heaven Hill announced a $65 million multi-year investment into expanding operations, which includes a renovation of the Bourbon Heritage Center.

In September 2021, about 420 workers, all members of the United Food and Commercial Workers union, went on strike due to disagreements over the terms of a new labor contract.

In February 2022, Heaven Hill acquired Samson & Surrey, the owner of Widow Jane and Few.

In 2023, Heaven Hill Brands settled a legal dispute with Log Still Distillery over Log Still's use of the "J.W. Dant" name. Heaven Hill had originally purchased the trademark in 1993, and had sued Log Still for trademark infringement in 2021, after the distillery claimed on its website that it was "reviving the Dant legacy".

== Production process ==
Heaven Hill Bourbon is made from a mash composed of 78% corn, 10% rye, and 12% malted barley. The barrels used for aging have a #3 char (barrel exposed to flame for 35 seconds). Prior to bottling, the whiskey is chill filtered through charcoal at 25 °F (−4 °C).

== Brands ==
Heaven Hill's beverage brands include:

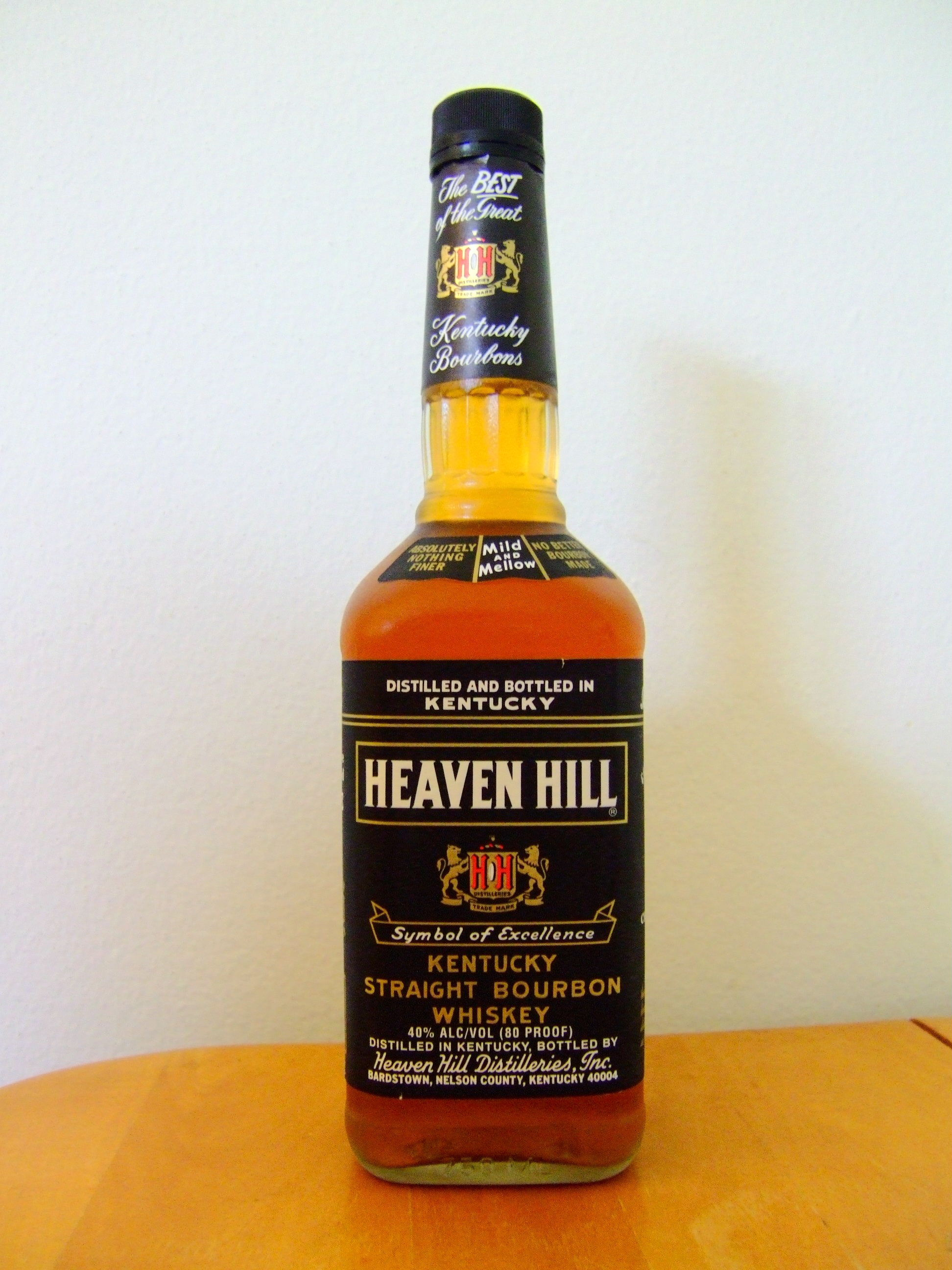
A bottle of Heaven Hill "Black" Bourbon

- Bourbon whiskey: Cabin Still, Elijah Craig, Evan Williams, Fighting Cock. Heaven Hill, Henry McKenna, J.T.S. Brown, Larceny (wheated), Old Fitzgerald (wheated), Parker's Heritage Collection, Widow Jane
- Corn whiskey: Georgia Moon, Mellow Corn
- Rye whiskey: Pikesville, Rittenhouse
- Wheat whiskey: Bernheim Original
- FEW : Bourbon, Rye, Single Malt, American whiskey
- Canadian whisky: Black Velvet
- Aperitif: Dubonnet
- Brandy: Christian Brothers, Sacred Bond
- Cognac: Ansac
- Liqueur: Carolans, Copa De Oro, Coronet VSQ, Fulton's Harvest, Hpnotiq, Irish Mist, PAMA
- Rum: Admiral Nelson, Blackheart
- Tequila: Lunazul, Two Fingers
- Vodka: Burnett's, Deep Eddy, Du Bouchett

== See also ==
- List of Kentucky companies
- List of historic whisky distilleries
