= Fighting cock (disambiguation) =

A fighting cock is a rooster used in the blood sport of cockfighting.

Fighting cock may also refer to:

- The Fighting Cocks: music venue in London, England.
- Fighting Cock (bourbon)
- The Fighting Cock, a 1963 Australian made-for-television film
- Fighting Cocks (fighter squadron), a fighter unit of the United States Air Force

== See also ==
- Ye Olde Fighting Cocks, a public house in St Albans, Hertfordshire
- The Fighting Gamecocks Lead the Way, fight song of the University of South Carolina
- Sandakozhi (lit. 'fighting rooster'), an Indian Tamil-language film series including Sandakozhi and Sandakozhi 2
