= Hpnotiq =

Alcoholic beverage

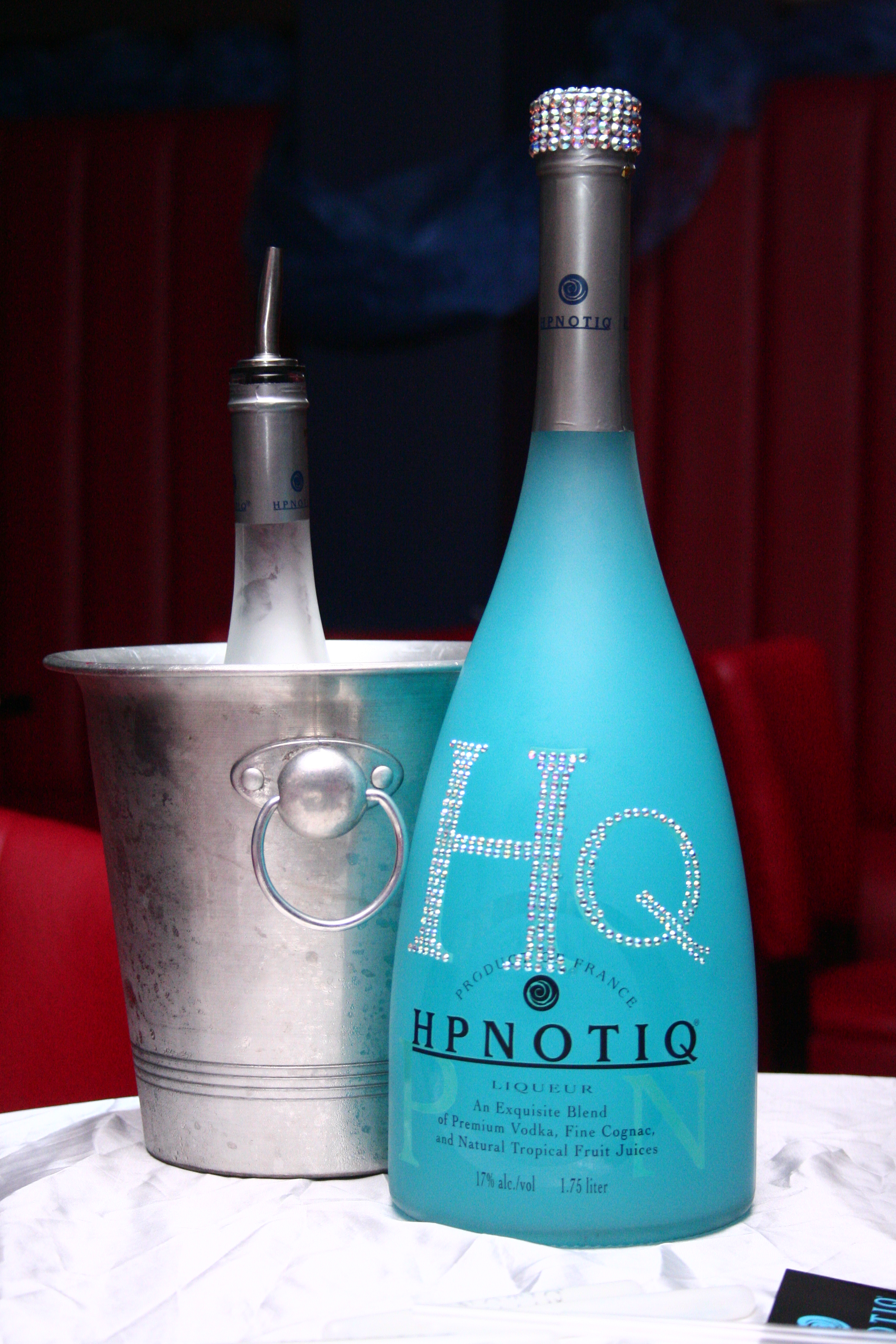
- Type: Liqueur
- Manufacturer: Heaven Hill
- Origin: France
- Alcohol by volume: 17%
- Proof (US): 34
- Color: Sky blue
- Flavor: Fruity, tropical
- Website: http://www.hpnotiq.com/

Hpnotiq (pronounced "hypnotic") is a vodka-based blue-colored liqueur. The company is based in New York, but the product is produced and bottled in France by Heaven Hill Distilleries, made from fruit juices, vodka and cognac. It is 34 proof (17% ABV) and is available in over 70 countries.

== History ==
Hpnotiq was created in 2001 by Raphael Yakoby, a college dropout living with his parents on Long Island, New York. After seeing a blue perfume at Bloomingdale's, he decided to create a blue liqueur. Raphael Yakoby raised money to start the new company receiving $200,000 from his brother Solomon Yakoby who in return received a 50% ownership in the company. Through Solomon Yakoby's contacts, Solomon and Raphael Yakoby met Nick Storm.

Nick Storm, a Yonkers, N.Y., native, partnered with Yakoby to promote it. Yakoby and Storm failed to sell the concept to major beverage manufacturers. They then promoted the drink in clubs and bars through a series of promotional events and parties that worked Storm's music industry contacts. The big break came when hip-hop impresario Sean "Diddy" Combs agreed to sell the drink in his restaurant chain Justin's in New York.

Urban and hip-hop groups began to promote the brand in music videos, on stage, and in rap lyrics from Kanye West, R. Kelly, Ludacris, Missy Elliott, Jay-Z, Lil' Kim, Fabolous and P. Diddy. Fabolous was instrumental in their success. He mentioned it in at least four songs on his album, Street Dreams. On his 2003 hit single "This Is My Party", Fabolous started his first verse with:"Ain't no tellin' what this Hpno' will do to me." A cocktail called "Incredible Hulk", whose color was reminiscent of the comic book hero, was made at Combs' Justin's restaurants.

The brand was originally distributed by Wingard Inc. of Great Neck, New York; in January 2003, Yakoby's trademark and the distribution rights were acquired by Heaven Hill Distilleries. The brand earned Yakoby a reported $50 million. Hpnotiq is bottled in France's Cognac region and made with cognac and triple-distilled French vodka. It is the fourth best-selling imported liqueur in the United States, according to Adams Beverage Media.

In September 2015, Hpnotiq launched an advertising campaign entitled "#Since2001", named after Hpnotiq's birth year. Heaven Hill, Hpnotiq's parent company, partnered with New York-based consumer marketing agency Team Epiphany to create the campaign, which enlisted rapper Cam'ron, visual artist Naturel, rapper and visual artist Yung Jake, and New York-based DJ and entrepreneur Va$htie Kola to help bring attention to themes and content inspired by the year 2001.
