= PAMA (liqueur) =

Pomegranate liqueur produced by PAMA Spirits

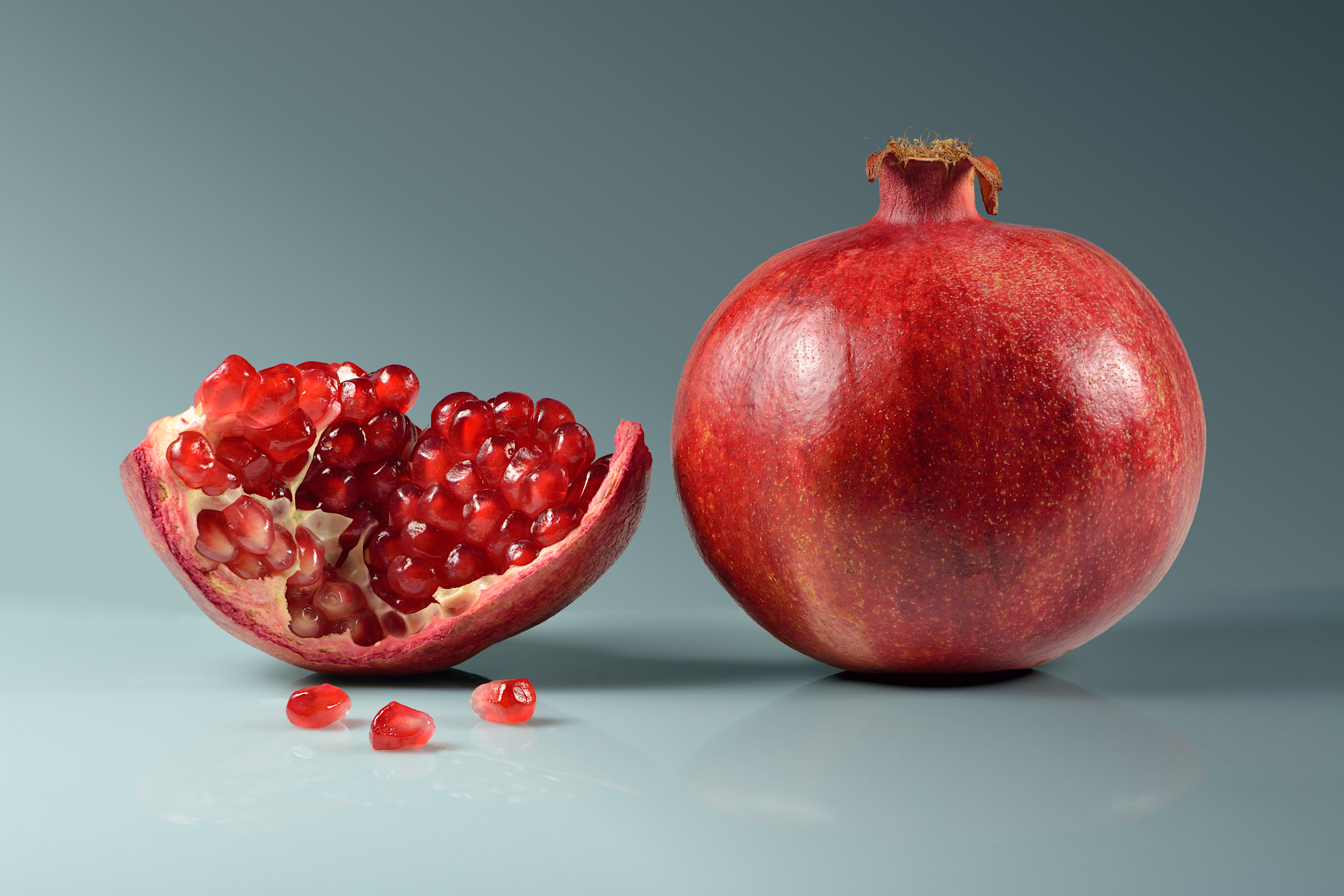
Pomegranate

PAMA is a pomegranate liqueur produced by PAMA Spirits Co. of Bardstown, Kentucky, United States, a subsidiary of Heaven Hill Distilleries, Inc., also based in Bardstown, Kentucky.

PAMA is marketed as "the world's first true pomegranate liqueur." According to PAMA Spirits Co., it is made from "the juice of California pomegranates, premium vodka, and a touch of imported tequila".

The liqueur is red in color and has a flavor that is both sweet and tart. It is 17 percent alcohol by volume.

PAMA is distributed in Australia by Think Spirits.
