= C.I.Agent Solutions =

Environmental protection company in Kentucky, US

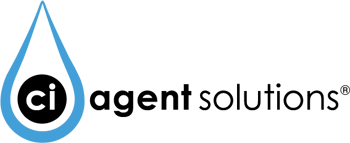
- Type: Private
- Industry: Waste Management, Environmental Services
- Founded: Louisville, Kentucky, U.S. (January 1, 2000)
- Founder: Dan Parker
- Headquarters: Louisville, Kentucky, U.S.
- Number of locations: 16 (2010)
- Area served: Worldwide
- Key people: Dan Parker, Founder
- Products: Oil Booms, Secondary Containment Systems, Spill Containment Systems
- Services: Oil spill containment Oil spill cleanup
- Revenue: US$ 4.9 million (2009), ▲88% from 2008
- Owner: Dan Parker
- Number of employees: 25
- Parent: Immediate Response Spill Technologies
- Website: ciagent.com

C.I.Agent Solutions is a Louisville, Kentucky-based company that specializes in environmental protection services. The company develops products to clean up hydrocarbon (fuel and oil) spills on land and water. Their main product is called C.I.Agent, a proprietary blend of USDA food-grade polymers that solidifies hydrocarbons.

== History ==
C.I.Agent Solutions was founded in 2000 by Dan Parker. He has served as president and a member of the board of directors since its inception. According to Dan Parker, the company was initially founded to effectively assist businesses to minimize their hazardous waste, reduce their legal liabilities, increase employee productivity, and save money at the same time.

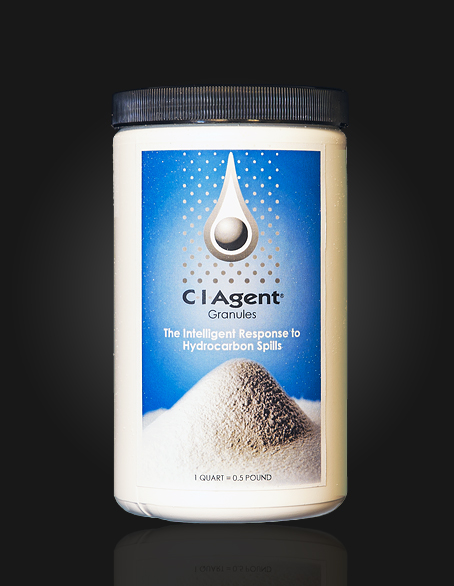
C.I.Agent granules

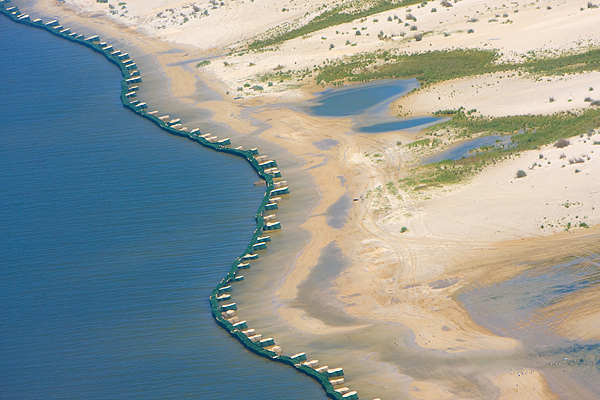
Barrier wall on Dauphin Island, Alabama (May 2010)

== Deepwater Horizon oil spill ==
C.I.Agent Solutions was approached by BP (at request of the Alabama Department of Emergency Management) to aid in shoreline protection efforts during the Deepwater Horizon oil spill. On Dauphin Island, the Alabama National Guard built a five-mile (eight-kilometer) barricade filled with C.I.Agent that officials called "the longest oil-water separator in the world".

== United States Senate Committee hearing ==
C.I.Agent Solutions founder Dan Parker and business partner Dan Koons appeared before the U.S. Senate Committee on Small Business & Entrepreneurship in Washington on June 17, 2010. The hearing, dubbed Harnessing Small Business Innovation: Navigating the Evaluation Process for Gulf Coast Oil Cleanup Proposals focused on small businesses obtaining contracts from the federal government to support cleanup of the Gulf Coast oil spill. Dan Parker and Dan Koons were invited to explain the efforts C.I.Agent Solutions has had to go through to get attention for innovative oil spill cleanup technologies.

== See also ==
- Environmental Protection Agency
- Secondary spill containment
- Boom (containment)
- National Oil and Hazardous Substances Pollution Contingency Plan
