= Incredible Hulk (cocktail) =

Green-colored cocktail

- Type: Cocktail
- Ingredients: One part hpnotiq; One part cognac
- Base spirit: Cognac, Hpnotiq
- Standard drinkware: Cocktail glass
- Served: On the rocks: poured over ice
- Preparation: Stir together and serve over ice.

An Incredible Hulk, Green Eyed Monster, Shrock, or Hip and Hen is a green-colored cocktail made by equal parts (2 fl oz each) of the fruit liqueur Hpnotiq and Hennessy brand cognac poured over ice. It is named after the Marvel Comics character Hulk, who is sometimes referred to as the Incredible Hulk.

== History ==
The drink was created at a Hpnotiq launch event by a restaurant bartender at Sean Combs' New York City restaurant, Justin's. A Hpnotiq employee noticed many women but few men drinking his company's liquor, because the men considered the blue, fruity drink to be too effeminate. Victor Alvarez, a bartender at the restaurant, mixed Hennessy with Hpnotiq to dilute the fruity flavor, resulting in a green beverage that quickly became a hit.

== Variations ==
The name 'Incredible Hulk' is also widely used amongst students in the North of England to describe a cocktail consisting of equal parts of WKD Blue and lager.

== Culture ==
The Incredible Hulk cocktail has been referenced in songs such as "Incredible Hulk" by the Memphis rap group Stress Free Fam and has appeared in music videos. It was also mentioned in The Boondocks episode "The Story of Thugnificent". Epic Meal Time, a YouTube cooking show, featured cocktail at the start of the episode "Masta Pasta" with Muscles Glasses being punched repeatedly in the chest. As Dave's punching stops to complain that his hand hurts, someone off-camera says, "That's what Incredible Hulk does to you." It can also be seen in the post-credits scene of The Incredible Hulk where General Ross is drinking a glass of the cocktail at a bar.
