= GameZnFlix =

American DVD-by-mail service (2004–2008)

- Type: Public (OTCBB)
- Industry: Rental
- Founded: 2004
- Fate: Defunct 2008
- Headquarters: Franklin, Kentucky
- Key people: John F. Fleming, CEO/President
- Products: DVD-by-mail
- Revenue: ▼US$931,000 (2008)
- Net income: ▼US$-1.1 million (2008)
- Number of employees: 1 (2008)
- Website: www.gameznflix.com

GameZnFlix was a DVD-by-mail subscription service offering flat rate rental of home videos and video games to customers in the United States. On September 6, 2007, the company did a 1:1000 reverse split of its stock and changed its ticker symbol from "GZFX" to "GMZN." The company's home page went dark in November 2008.

GameZnFlix operated in much the same fashion as other DVD-by-mail subscription services such as Netflix, although it rented both movies and video games and thus also competed with game-only services such as GameFly. Subscribers could also buy selected DVDs or games at a reduced price, should they choose to keep the movie or game. GameZnFlix also acted as a traditional online retailer and offered new copies of DVDs and video games for sale.

Circuit City (now defunct) offered one month prepaid subscriptions of GameZnFlix for new customers, and gift certificates that could be sent to friends and family.

== Rental offerings and memberships ==
GameZnFlix offered online rental of video games for the PlayStation, PlayStation 2, Xbox, GameCube, Xbox 360, PlayStation 3, and Wii and movies in DVD, HD DVD, and Blu-ray Disc formats. They did not offer cartridge-based gaming formats such as those used for the Game Boy Advance and Nintendo DS.

GameZnFlix offered three monthly subscription plans, which allowed the customer 1, 2, or 3 video games or movies at a time. All plans were of the unlimited variety. 14-day free trials of most of the plans were available with a restricted selection of titles.

Members of the U.S. military received discounted pricing (roughly 10% off) on these plans, and GameZnFlix shipped to foreign military bases through the APO/FPO military mail service.

== Financials ==
According to the last available SEC filings, GameZnFlix discontinued operations in the video rental business in November 2008. The filing states that the company will look for other business ventures to be acquired. The company had net losses of $1.1 million on revenue of $931,000 in 2008 versus losses of over $10 million on revenue of $3.6 million in 2007.

== Distribution centers ==
According to the GameZnFlix 2007 Annual Report, the company used warehouses in Colorado and Kentucky to service its customers.

== Marketing ==
From February 2004 through the 2005 Super Bowl GameZnFlix maintained a television advertisement campaign, some of which featured the actor Ben Curtis (best known as "The Dell Dude" in advertisements for Dell, Inc.).

A pilot marketing program with electronics retailer Circuit City from November 2005 to March 2006 was extended to a full co-marketing agreement with all US stores offering prepaid subscriptions and other promotional efforts by Circuit City (flyers, online, etc.). All stores were participating as of December 2006.

Throughout 2006, GameZnFlix sponsored a bicycle racing team in Tennessee and several watercraft competitions throughout the United States. They increased Internet advertising with Internet service providers and started an affiliate program. They also teamed up with McDonald's and ClickCaster in a cross-country series of promotional events featuring tour buses, Ridge Racer 6 gaming competitions, outdoor movie showings, and other activities. Other tie-ins included Circuit City stores, ClickCaster broadcasts from on-site locations, and contributions to the Ronald McDonald House and other local charities.

== Legal proceedings ==
From the GameznFlix 2008 Annual Report – Item 3. Legal Proceedings:

On February 8, 2008, an action was filed in the United States District Court, Western District of Pennsylvania, entitled Mobile Satellite Communications v. GameZnFlix, Inc. et al. In this action, the plaintiff claims that it was damaged as a result of the termination of the agreement covering leased television channels by GNF Entertainment, LLC. A judgment in the amount of $350,000 has been rendered to the Plaintiff.

On February 28, 2008, an action was filed in the Simpson Circuit Court, Franklin, Kentucky, entitled CNET Networks, Inc v. GameZnFlix, Inc., D/B/A GameZnFlix.com. In this action, the plaintiff claims that it was damaged as a result of not being paid for online advertising requested by GameZnFlix, Inc. in the amount of $96,000. A judgment in the amount of $67,038 has been rendered to the Plaintiff.

On July 17, 2008, an action was filed in Simpson Circuit Court, Franklin, Kentucky, entitled Ingram Entertainment, Inc. v. John Fleming D/B/A GameZnFlix, Inc. In this action, the plaintiff claims that it was damaged as a result of not being paid for purchases made in 2007 in the amount of $45,040 (~$69,935 in 2025). A judgement in the amount of $45,940 (~$65,521 in 2024) plus interest until settled was rendered on November 24, 2008.

== Name change ==
Eight months after shutting down its DVD and game rental website (without notice to customers), GameznFlix announced that it has changed its corporate name to TBC Global News Network, Inc. and their stock trading symbol to TGLN. The change was to reflect a change in its business model from Online Video Rental to become a media organization concentrating on news and information about the second and third tier of American business.

GameznFlix CEO John Fleming stated, "Between CNBC, Fox Business Network and Bloomberg, the market is pretty well saturated with information about Fortune 500 companies. We intend to focus on the companies you rarely hear about, those trading on the NASDAQ Small Cap, OTCBB, Pink Sheets and some interesting privately held firms that aren't publicly traded at all."

In October 2015, the company changed its name once again to InCapta Inc (stock symbol INCT).
