= Broadbent's =

Broadbent B & B Food Products is a food products supplier based in Kentucky, United States. It specializes in the production and sale of country ham, bacon, and sausage.

== History ==
Broadbent's was opened in 1909 by Smith Broadbent Sr. and his wife, Anna Broadbent, with the purpose of selling their meats to friends, neighbors, and other residents of Trigg County, KY. Though Broadbent catered to people throughout Trigg County, the main location was in Cadiz. The company was later passed down to Broadbent's grandson, Smith Broadbent III, in 1963. At its peak, Broadbent's was a vertically integrated company, as they raised, slaughtered, prepared, and sold their own products. In 1965, the company expanded to include nationwide mail order, which in time became a large share of their sales.

=== Drennan ownership ===
In 1999, Broadbent's was sold to Ronny and Beth Drennan, who were originally involved in the production of crafts and furniture. At this time, Broadbent's continued to sell their products nationwide through mail order, a giftshop, and a single wholesale customer. By the time the Drennan's purchased the company, the Broadbent's had discontinued raising their own livestock, instead outsourcing the production of pork. AS the Drennan's grew their business they leased a third building in Pembrooke, KY. In 2008, the previous three facilities were merged into one central location in Kuttawa, which as of 2024 is still the primary processing plant.

The Drennan's also expanded into online sales, which as of September 2009 accounted for 50% of sales when combined with mail order, which was maintained through the transition between ownership. In 2009, they celebrated the company's 100th anniversary.
