= SITEX Corporation =

Laundry industry

- Company type: Private
- Industry: Service
- Founded: 1961; 65 years ago (as Industrial Uniform Services, Incorporated); 1995; 31 years ago (as SITEX)
- Founders: James Sights; Gladys Sights
- Headquarters: Henderson, Kentucky, U.S.
- Key people: Wes Sights (President and CEO); Jon Sights (Executive Vice President); Hugh Hennessy (CFO)
- Owner: Cintas
- Number of employees: 1000
- Website: sitex-corp.com

SITEX Corporation is an American provider of uniform and linen services, mats, mops, custom apparel, promotional items, screen-printing, embroidery, first aid, and restroom hygiene services in Kentucky, Indiana, Tennessee, and Illinois.

Founded in 1961, it is under the management of Wes and Jon Sights, marking the third generation of their family to operate in the laundry industry. Since 2025, SITEX has been owned by Cintas.

== History ==
Industrial Uniform Services, Incorporated was founded by James and Gladys Sights in January 1961 in Henderson, Kentucky. With Rental Uniform, Inc. the organization reached into Southwest Kentucky, West Tennessee, Southeast Missouri, and Southern Illinois.

During that same period, the Sights family established the operating name Sani-Clean Linen & Uniform Service as a "doing-business-as" (DBA) for Industrial Uniform Service to reflect their expanded offerings. In August 1995, the family decided to change the business and official name to SITEX Corporation, with "SITEX" being short for Sights Textiles.

In 2003, it worked with J.E. Shekell to build a 72,000 square foot laundry facility in Henderson, Kentucky. Hart's Rental Uniform Services, LLC became part of SITEX in December 2008.

In February 2024, it was announced that it had been acquired by the Fortune 500 company Cintas.
