= Lunazul =

Blue agave tequila produced by Tierra de Agaves

Tequila Lunazul
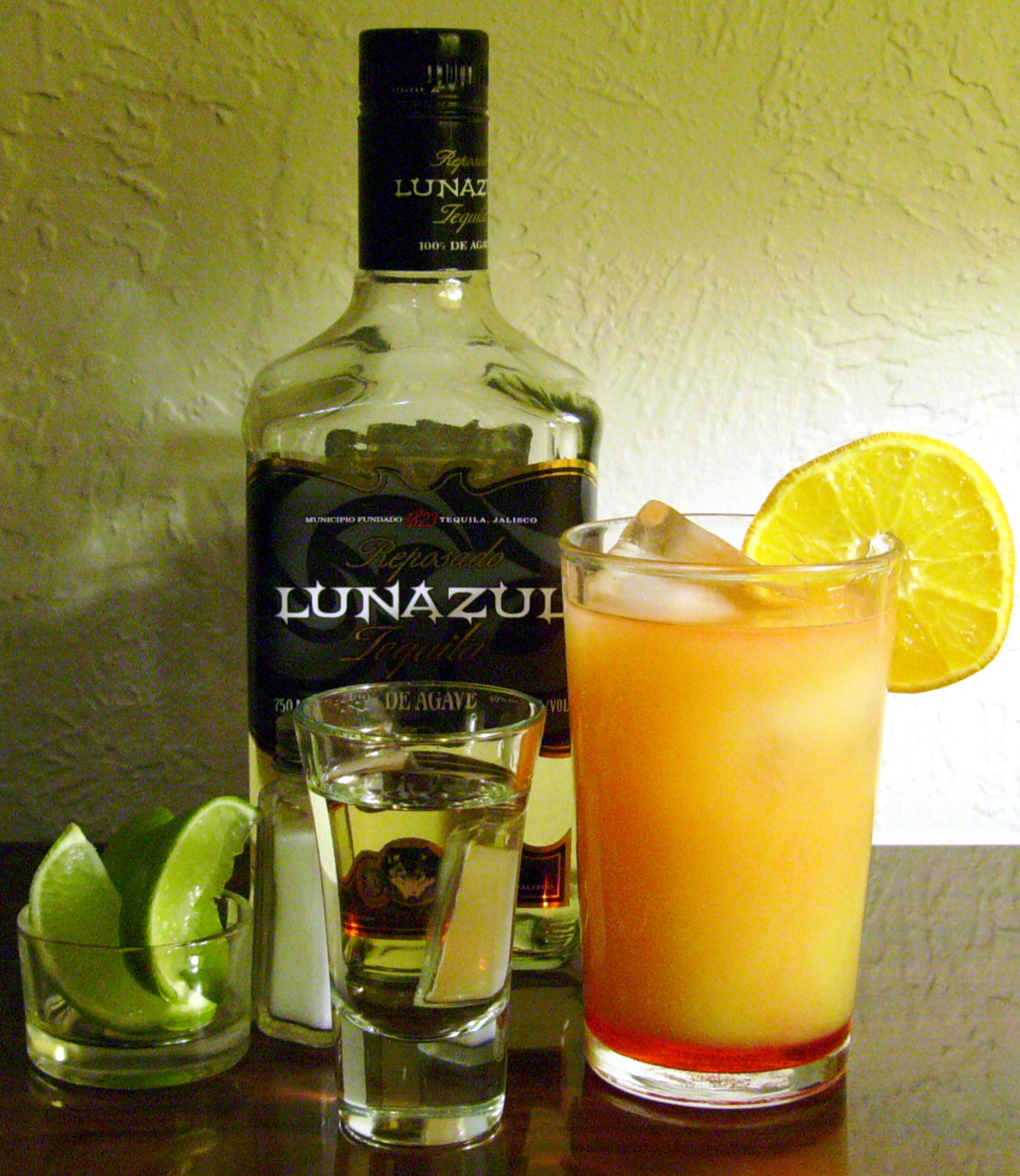
- Type: Tequila
- Manufacturer: Tierra de Agaves
- Distributor: Heaven Hill Distilleries
- Origin: Mexico
- Introduced: 2002
- Alcohol by volume: 40%
- Proof (US): 80
- Website: www.lunazultequila.com

Lunazul Tequila is a 100% blue agave tequila produced by the Tierra de Agaves company.

== History ==
Francisco Beckmann, a former co-owner of the tequila brand José Cuervo, founded the Tierra de Agaves company in 2002. Lunazul tequila is grown, distilled, and bottled on a single estate in Tequila, Jalisco, Mexico.

== Products ==
Lunazul Blanco
Lunazul Reposado
Lunazul Añejo
Lunazul Primero
Lunazul El Humoso
Lunazul Cristalino
