= Royal Photo Company =

American company

- Type: Commercial photography
- Founded: 1904
- Founder: Louis Bramson
- Defunct: 1972
- Headquarters: Louisville, Kentucky

The Royal Photo View Company in was a commercial photography company located in Louisville, Kentucky that opened in 1904.

Louis Bramson established the Royal Photo View Company in 1904, with the company later being renamed the Royal Photo Company in 1908. The Royal Photo Company focused on commercial photography and, unlike many other photographic businesses, did not operate a studio for portraits. Clients included Hillerich & Bradsby, makers of the Louisville Slugger baseball bat, and other businesses such as Southern Bell Telephone & Telegraph Company, Brown & Williamson Tobacco Corporation, and the Kaufman-Straus department store.

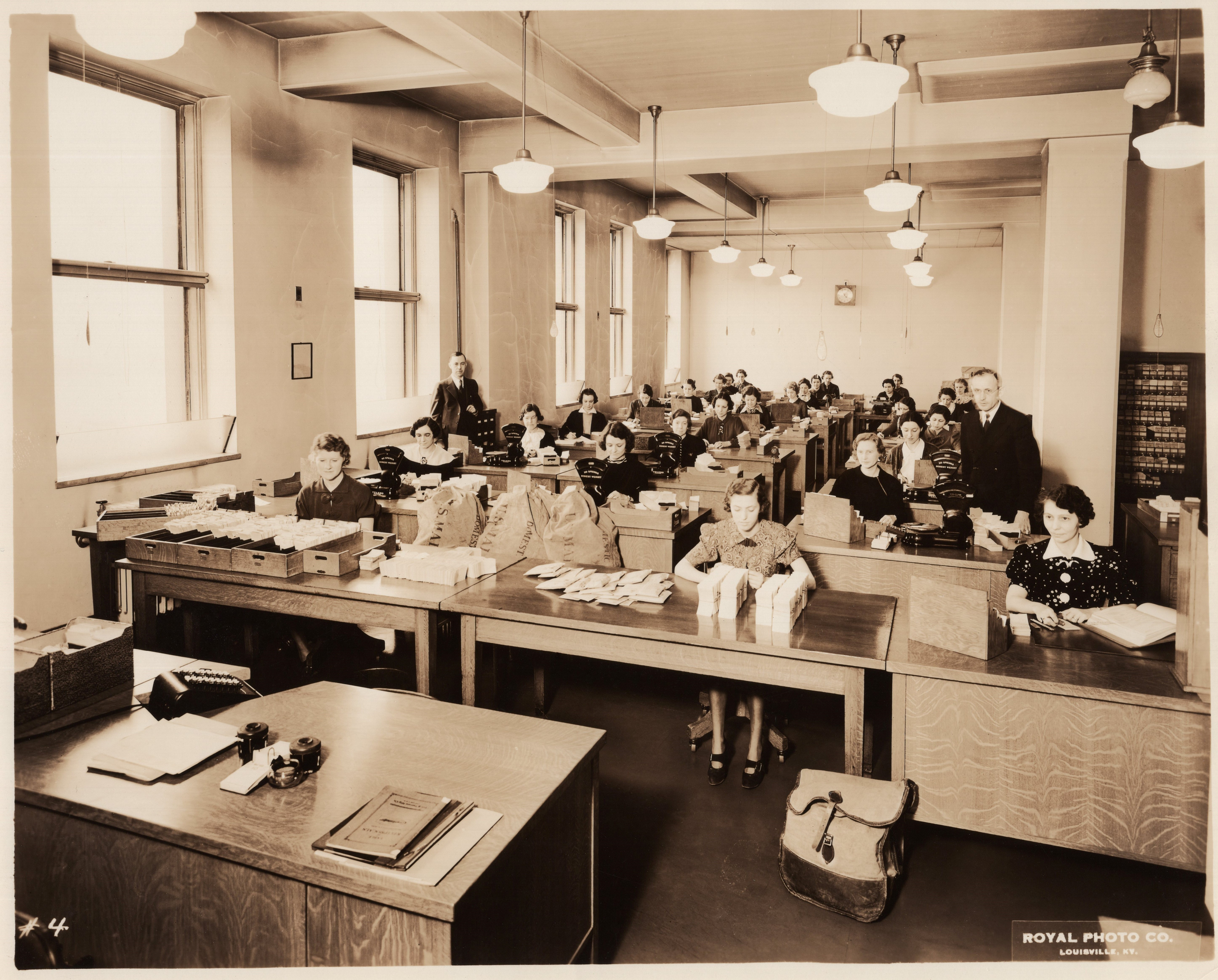
Taken by the Royal Photo Company circa 1930's

Stern Bramson (1912–1989), the son of Louis Bramson, joined the studio upon graduation from DuPont Manual High School in 1930 and remained with the firm until 1972 except for a break for service with the Army Signal Corps during World War II. He eventually became Royal's principal photographer and was the owner of the studio after the death of his father.

The University of Louisville Photographic Archives acquired the Royal Photo Company collection of photographic negatives in 1982.
