= Ouibox =

- Type: Private
- Founded: Lexington, Kentucky, U.S. (2006)
- Founder: Peyton Fouts
- Headquarters: Lexington, Kentucky, U.S.
- Area served: Worldwide
- Key people: Peyton Fouts
- Website: www.ouibox.com

Ouibox was a website headquartered in Lexington, Kentucky. It featured a social network aggregator, a writing tool called OuiWrite which auto-cited sources, and an affiliate shopping tool called OuiShop which generated donations to charities without affecting a user's purchase price.

Ouibox signed up 8000 users on the week it launched. It was one of the first investments of the Bluegrass Angels Venture Fund II.

== History ==
Ouibox was founded in 2006 by Peyton Fouts, a graduate of the English and Communications programs at the University of Kentucky.

Archived records indicate that its website showed no changes on its homepage between June 2014 and July 2019. The site had disappeared completely by August 2019.
