= Mammoth Resource Partners =

Business in Kentucky, US

Mammoth Resource Partners, Inc.
- Type: Private
- Industry: Oil and Natural Gas Exploration
- Founded: 2004
- Headquarters: Cave City, Kentucky
- Key people: Dr. Roger L. Cory, CEO, Daniel R. Northcutt, President
- Number of employees: More than 30 worldwide (2008)
- Website: www.mammothresource.com

Mammoth Resource Partners, Inc, is a private company specializing in oil and natural gas exploration in the Appalachian Basin of the United States. It is majority owned by CEO and founder Roger L. Cory. Daniel R. Northcutt is the president and chief operating officer. Its litigation problems began almost immediately. These legal issues continued with various private settlements and included a federal trial, alleging various securities violations and fraud.

== Company information ==
Since inception, Mammoth Resource Partners has completed 73 wells for oil and natural gas. Of the last 40 consecutive drillings, Mammoth Resource Partners has struck producible hydrocarbons in all wells. While Mammoth explored for oil in its first years, today the company focuses almost exclusively on exploration of natural gas.

The company employs approximately 30 men and women at its headquarters and field services offices. Mammoth Resource Partners owns or controls the mineral rights to over 15,000 acres (61 km^{2}) of Appalachian Basin property and is quickly becoming one of the region's top natural gas producers.

== Headquarters ==
Mammoth Resource Partners is headquartered in Cave City, Kentucky, which provides relatively close proximity to its 15,000 acres (61 km^{2}) of lease and land holdings in the Appalachian Basin. Mammoth also has a field services location in Burkesville.

== Timeline ==
• Mammoth Resource Partners, Inc. incorporated in April 2004 • Mammoth Premier released May, 2004 • Mammoth Discovery released July, 2004 • Mammoth Reveal released December, 2004 • Mammoth Reserve released March, 2005 • Mammoth Opportunity released July, 2005 • Mammoth Prosperity released October, 2005 • Mammoth Advantage released September, 2005 • Mammoth Conversion begins production April, 2006 • Mammoth Exclusive begins production February, 2007 • Mammoth Vista begins production April, 2007 • Mammoth Succession begins production May, 2007 • Mammoth Progression begins production February, 2008 • Chimney Rock project begins production March, 2008

== Environmental policies and procedures ==
Mammoth Resource Partners' commitment to environmental safety is expressed through its field policies, which are designed to minimize its environmental impact.

- Drill pads - Prior to drilling, raw land must be excavated into a usable drill pad. Mammoth's knowledge of the formations into which it drills allow its crews to minimize the amount of land cleared for drill operations. A typical drill pad will measure approximately 200 by 200 feet, or about 9/10's of an acre. Mammoth has used drill pads as small as 50 by 50 feet when possible.
- Erosion and sediment control - During excavation of sites, Mammoth utilizes an array of erosion and sediment control devices. Culverts, silt fences, break dams, and ditches control surface water runoff, and prevent sediment from escaping the site. Proper planning helps Mammoth employ these measures so as to limit the effect its drilling activities has on the environment.
- Well spacing - All wells are spaced at a minimum 1,000 feet offset from another well. This minimizes surface impact by disturbing only a small amount of the available land. If Mammoth crews find two or more production zones, they have the potential to use the same well pad to drill a second "twin" well, as opposed to creating a new location.
- Protecting fresh water zones - When drilling an oil or gas well, inevitably fresh water will be encountered. When fresh water is found, casing is set into the well bore. Concrete is circulated down the casing string so that it pushes up between the outside of the casing and the well bore. This concrete holds the casing in place, and prevents water from entering the well or hydrocarbons from being released into the fresh water zone.
- Produced water - Generally, an oil or gas well will produce a certain amount of fresh or brine water. These fluids are collectively known as produced water. Produced water contains trace amounts of hydrocarbons and minerals, and is considered hazardous waste. Mammoth stores produced water in holding tanks until it can be picked up by an approved transporter and taken off-site for disposal.
- Land reclamation - After drilling and stimulation are complete, land surrounding the well site that will not be needed for daily operations are limed, reseeded, and mulched. This prevents erosion from the drill pad. Proper reclamation of drill sites also allows wildlife to naturally re-introduce to disturbed areas.
- Spill prevention - Each site is part of a spill prevention, control and countermeasure plan (SPCC) that is certified by an engineering firm. The SPCC outlines measures that are taken to prevent spills, such as outlining inspection, maintenance, and training schedules; controlling spills through the use of remote impoundments or berms around storage facilities; and steps that will be taken in the event of an accidental discharge.

== Business ethics ==
Mammoth Resource Partners built its business model around the concept of corporate transparency. Partners in Mammoth projects are given access to a proprietary Partner Communication Systems, which informs them of their project's progress and production in near real time. The Internet data delivery is coupled with monthly letters written by Mammoth President Dr. Roger L. Cory to each Partner reporting that month's project activity in detail.
