= Shay's Bones and Biscuits =

Dog treat company

- Company type: Privately owned
- Founded: Kentucky, United States (2004)
- Founder: Shay Hammond
- Fate: Closed
- Headquarters: Kentucky
- Products: Dog Treats
- Net income: $200 (2006)

Shay's Bones and Biscuits was a company that sold dog treats, founded by 11-year-old Shay Hammond in 2004. Shay was inspired to found the company by her dog, Pancake, to whom she used to feed homemade treats. The company was fairly small scale, with an annual revenue of about $200, however, as a result of her founding of the company Hammond was awarded $1000 by NFTE. The company traded online and in retail outlets in Kentucky, but it has since been discontinued, as Hammond was too busy with school activities to continue it.

== History ==
The company was founded in 2004 by Shay Hammond and received a fair bit of media coverage during its first year, mainly due to Hammond being 11 at the time of founding. Hammond also received multiple awards and recognitions for the founding, she was awarded $1,000 in the 2006 after winning the Kentucky NFTE "Young Entrepreneur of the Year" award, and in 2007 she was recognized with a Guardian Life Insurance "Girls Going Places" award for entrepreneurship in general. Hammond was also interviewed on ABC News "Money Matters" which aired on live television 2 days before the NFTE event in 2006.

Two years after founding the company Hammond had hopes for it, and said she wished to start mass-producing her treats and to open a retail location. After taking an entrepreneurship class sponsored by the University of Kentucky, which is in addition to her NFTE sponsored class, she continued selling her dog treats up until her freshman year of highschool. She says that it was hard for her to obtain a large custom, with the majority of people casting a skeptical eye over her company. Hammond no longer runs Shay's Bones and Biscuits, as it became to difficult for her to manage along with school and multiple afterschool activities.

== Products ==
The biscuits were made in two flavors: Mutter Butter and Chicken Lickin', or Peanut Butter and Chicken respectively. The ingredients were all-natural, and founder Hammond mentioned that dipping the products in cheese was popular.
