= Sindhi horse =

Breed of horse

The Sindhi horse is a breed of horse native to the Sindh, Kutch and Gujrat. Sindh has different types of horses such as Arabi, Samoundi, Sindhi-Kathiawari and Sindhi-Katchi horses. Sindhi horse is unique from other horses in the world. Majority of the horses in Sindh are mares. Sindhi-Katchi horse is recognised by Indian government.
