= Kinetic theTechnologyAgency =

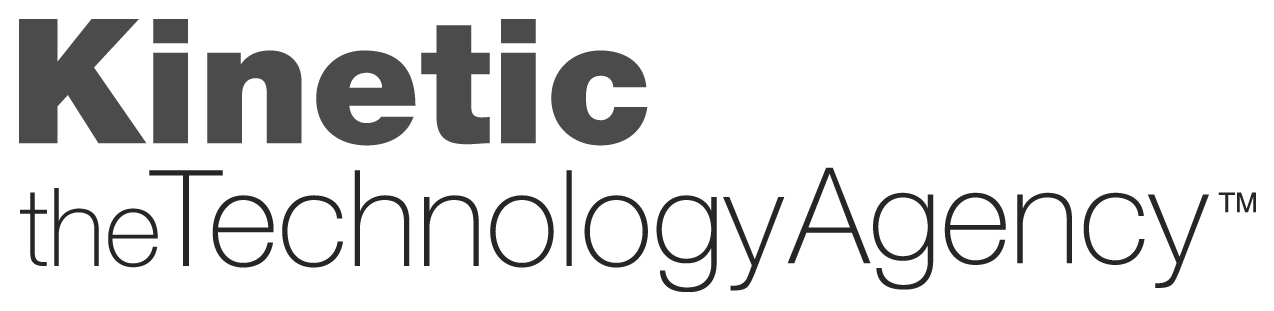
- Company type: Private
- Industry: Software
- Founded: 1968
- Founder: Ray Schuhmann
- Headquarters: Louisville, Kentucky, U.S.
- Area served: Worldwide

Kinetic theTechnologyAgency is a software company based in Louisville, Kentucky. Kinetic provides The Globalizor™ translation management system (software). The company offers enterprise-level software. Kinetic theTechnologyAgency is located in Distillery Commons in Louisville, Kentucky.

== History ==
Kinetic Corporation was founded by Ray Schuhmann in 1968 as a commercial photography studio. Kinetic quickly evolved into a full-service photography and graphics business. During the 1970s, Kinetic was nationally known for advertising photography, supported by an on-site full-service photo lab. Company founder Ray Schuhmann has been the official photographer and archivist of the Kentucky Derby for the last 50 years.

By the 1990s, Kinetic was developing custom applications for a newly emerging platform: the Internet.

In 2000, Kinetic began its focused transition from photography based services to software and technology based services. Kinetic now derives the majority of its revenue from technology licensing, support and digital services.

In 2011, Kinetic quadrupled its staff to meet the needs of the growing demand for its software solutions.

In April 2013, Kinetic theTechnologyAgency and Netherlands-based Foxiz B.V. teamed up to increase adoption and support in Europe of Kinetic's translation management software and support services.

== Accomplishments ==
- Kinetic theTechnologyAgency was named one of Louisville's 50 fastest growing businesses in 2012.
- Kinetic was named a Top 5 Information Technology company in Louisville in 2013.
- Kinetic was included in the 2013 Inc. 5000 list.
- Kinetic was a recipient of the 2013 Martha Layne Collins Award for International Trade Excellence.
- Kinetic was named the 5th fastest-growing private company in the Louisville Area in 2013.
- Kinetic made its second consecutive appearance on the Inc. 5000 list in 2014.
- Kinetic was included on the 2014 Business First Louisville Fast 50 list for the third consecutive year.

== See also ==
- Globalization
- Language localisation
- Translation
