= U.S. Cavalry Store =

American clothing distributor

- Company type: Private
- Industry: Retail; military/law enforcement equipment
- Founded: 1973
- Founder: Randy Acton
- Fate: Filed for bankruptcy in 2013; assets sold to Galls LLC in 2016
- Successor: Galls LLC
- Headquarters: Radcliff, Kentucky, United States
- Products: Military and law enforcement gear; duty equipment; outdoor supplies
- Website: www.galls.com

U.S. Cavalry was a worldwide distributor headquartered in Radcliff, Kentucky, that provided duty and service equipment for the military, law enforcement, and homeland security communities. U.S. Cavalry delivered clothing, gear, and supplies and outdoor equipment. The company made its money through managed accounts, retail stores, mail order catalogs and the product website.

The company was founded in 1973 by Randy Acton.

U.S. Cavalry filed for bankruptcy in 2013 and was purchased by Aegis Brand Group, a privately owned facilities services company headquartered in Tennessee.

After struggling to restore the brand, ERMC, under the parent company Aegis Brand Group, sold U.S. Cavalry and USCAV's assets to Galls LLC in March 2016.
