= Correctional Custody Unit =

Disciplinary program in the US Marine Corps

The Correctional Custody Unit (CCU or Remotivation Platoon) is a disciplinary program in the United States Marine Corps under which "salvageable" offenders are provided "re-education, refocusing and re-greening". The intent of the program is to resolve disciplinary issues without more serious recourse like confinement to the brig or a court martial.

In 2002, it was reported that three Marine bases had a CCU: Camp Hansen (Okinawa), Camp Lejeune (North Carolina), and Camp Pendleton (California).
