= Fighting Cock (bourbon) =

Brand of Kentucky straight bourbon whiskey

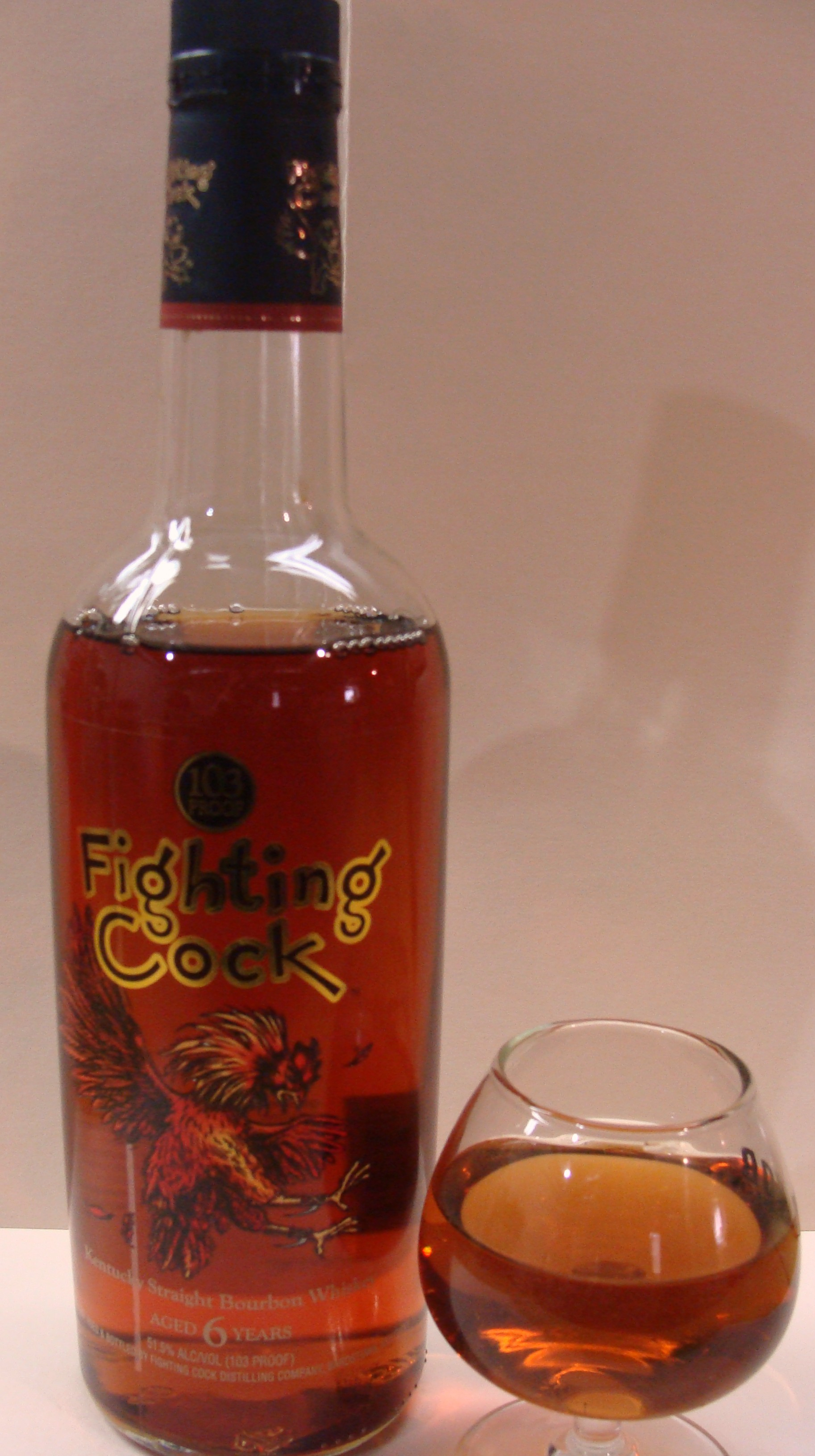
- Type: Bourbon whiskey
- Manufacturer: Heaven Hill
- Origin: Kentucky, United States
- Alcohol by volume: 51.50%
- Proof (US): 103
- Related products: Heaven Hill
- Website: www.heavenhill.com/brand/18

Fighting Cock is a brand of Kentucky straight bourbon whiskey produced in Bardstown, Kentucky by Heaven Hill Distilleries, Inc. It is sold in 16 oz (1 pint or 375 ml), 750 ml, and 1-liter glass bottles.

The mash bill for Fighting Cock bourbon includes corn, barley and rye, and the product is aged for six years. It is bottled at 103 proof (51.5% alcohol by volume). As of 2022, the bottle label states that this bourbon is aged at least 36 months (3 years).

== Reviews ==
Food critic Morgan Murphy said "The 6-year-old whiskey carries a honey, nutmeg, and leather flavor."
