= Equix =

Equix is a company in Lexington, Kentucky, founded in 1984. The company evaluates equine biometrics and motion through the use of high-speed digital tools for the purpose of finding athletic potential. Their products are used mainly on two-year-old Thoroughbred racehorses at training sales. Equix uses the measurements of horses in order to predict potential, and in so doing helps clients select both racehorses and breeding matches.

Equix has published several studies with the results of their analysis. One study found that colts and fillies with below average jaw widths will have a higher probability of becoming graded stakes winners than horses with above average jaw widths. This goes against the common perception that a wider jaw is better because it allows the horse to take in more air as they are running. Equix also found that better athletes are produced by breeding mares and stallions of similar conformation. This is in opposition to the common practice of breeding horses that were found to be the most compatible through computer models of race records and breeding history, rather than a comparison of their physical types.
