= Secondary spill containment =

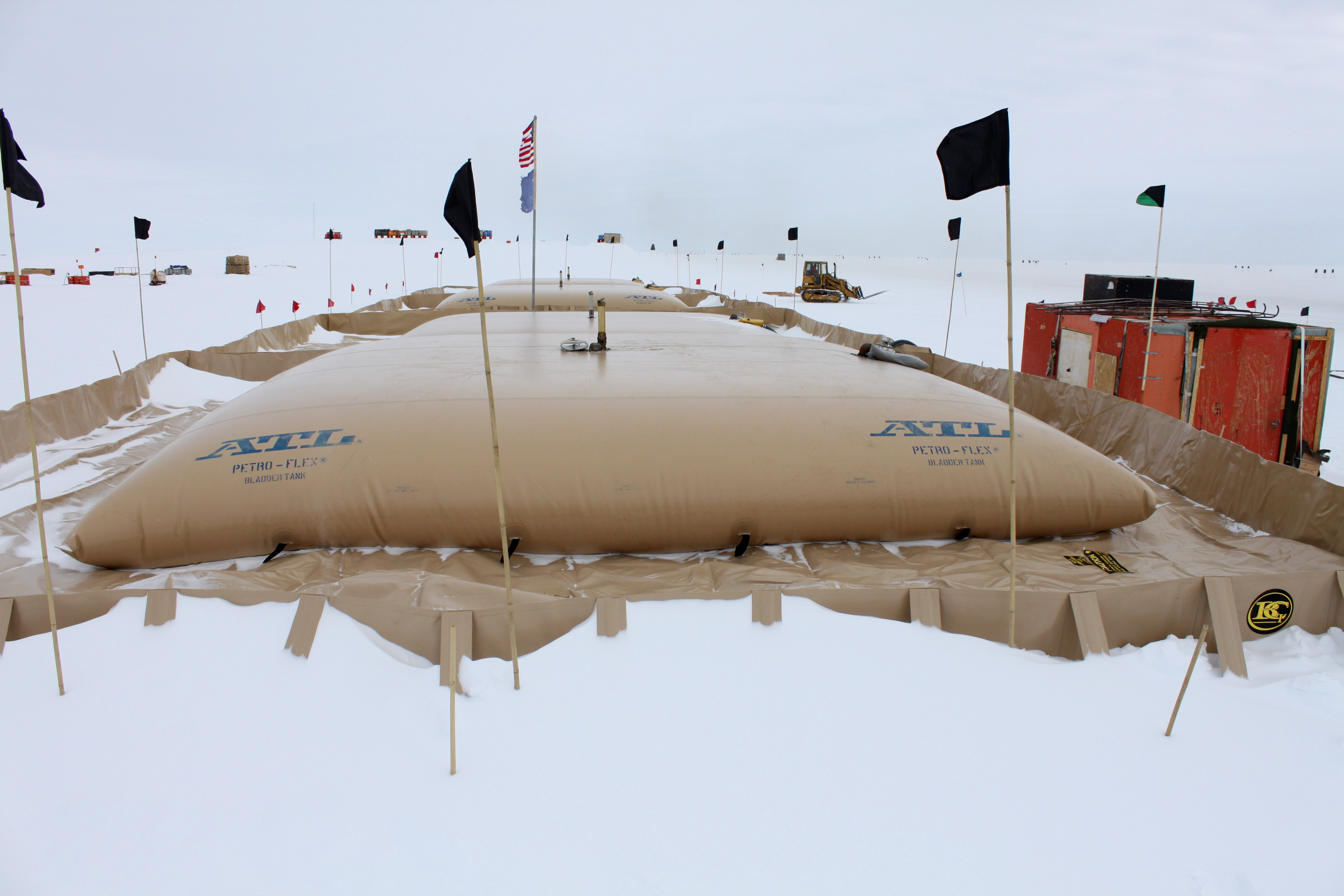
Fuel bladder with secondary spill containment

Secondary spill containment refers to systems or planned actions designed to capture, isolate, or divert regulated liquid-based products in the event of a leak or spill, preventing it from entering the surrounding environment.

== History ==
In the United States, the primary regulatory framework that mandates secondary containment is the Spill Prevention, Control, and Countermeasure (SPCC) rule, found in Title 40, Chapter I, Subchapter D, Part 112 of the Code of Federal Regulations, which governs oil pollution prevention.

Although most secondary‑containment requirements focus on oil and oil‑related products under the SPCC rule, other federal regulations like the Resource Conservation Recovery Act (RCRA) and industry codes outside the EPA may also require secondary containment for various chemical substances or hazardous wastes, depending on the type of material being stored and the facility’s operations.

== Containment Design ==
Secondary spill containment is divided into two approaches, active and passive. The method used depends largely on the type of operation taking place, the substances being handled, and what the most likely failure mode scenario would be. When selecting or designing a containment strategy, facilities must consider their day‑to‑day processes as well as the requirements outlined in their written response plan, which often incorporates a combination of both active and passive systems.

Example oil skimming booms being installed over water.

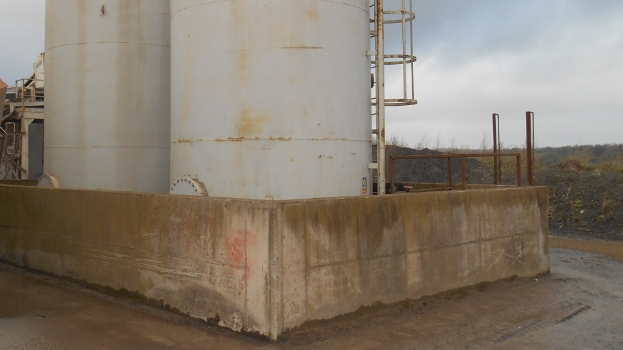
Example retaining wall secondary containment.

- Active spill containment refers to measures that require direct human action to deploy or operate the containment method. Active methods are generally only used when a passive method is not feasible or an operating is always going to be there during the operation. Examples include:
  - Sorbent materials
  - Using spill kits
  - Drain Covers
  - Manually operating gates, valvaes, or shut offs
  - Deploying floating booms

- Passive spill containment involves engineered structures or devices installed before any spill occurs. These systems operate automatically, providing protection by capturing or controlling released materials without the need for human involvement.
- For passive systems that are exposed to the elements, industry practice is to size the containment area to hold at least 110% of the maximum possible liquid volume. This extra capacity accounts for rainwater, debris, and any structures located within the containment area. Examples include:
  - Dikes, berms, or retaining walls sufficiently impervious to contain oil
  - Curbing or drip pans
  - Sumps and collection systems
  - Culverting, gutters, or other drainage systems
  - Weirs, booms, or other barriers
  - Spill diversion ponds
  - Retention ponds
  - Double-walled tanks
  - Spill containment pallets

== In the electrical utility industry ==
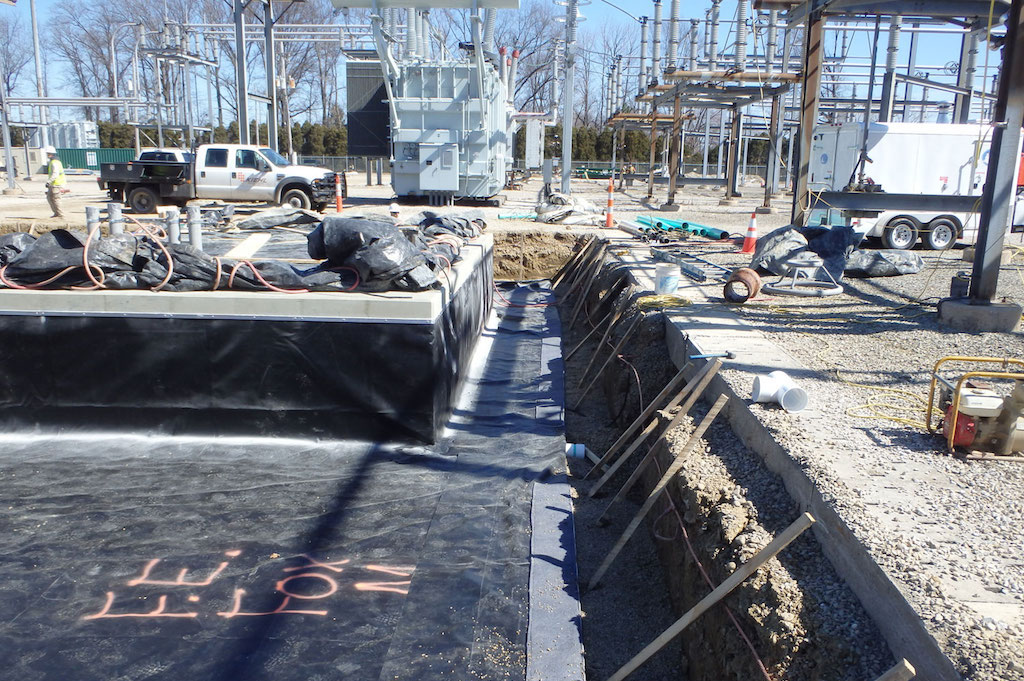
Adaptable Secondary Oil Containment around a Transformer.

United States Environmental Protection Agency (EPA) Spill Prevention, Control, and Countermeasure (SPCC) guidelines require that facilities that store large quantities of petroleum (products) must have a plan in place to contain a spill. The purpose of the SPCC rule is to establish requirements for facilities to prevent a discharge of oil into navigable waters or adjoining shorelines. Within the electric utility industry, oil-filled transformers are often in need of secondary containment. Outdated secondary containment techniques such as concrete catch-basins are quickly losing ground to solutions that offer more cost-effective cleanup in case of a spill or leak. One example of a more cost-effective method involves placing a geotextile boom filled with oil solidifying polymers around a transformer. These geotextile barriers allow for flow of water, but completely solidify oil in the event of a leak and effectively seal the spill. Many electrical utility companies are switching to this method because it saves them significant amounts of money when a spill occurs, because there is no need to employ vac-trucks afterwards to clean up a spill inside a catch-basin.

== Portable spill containment ==
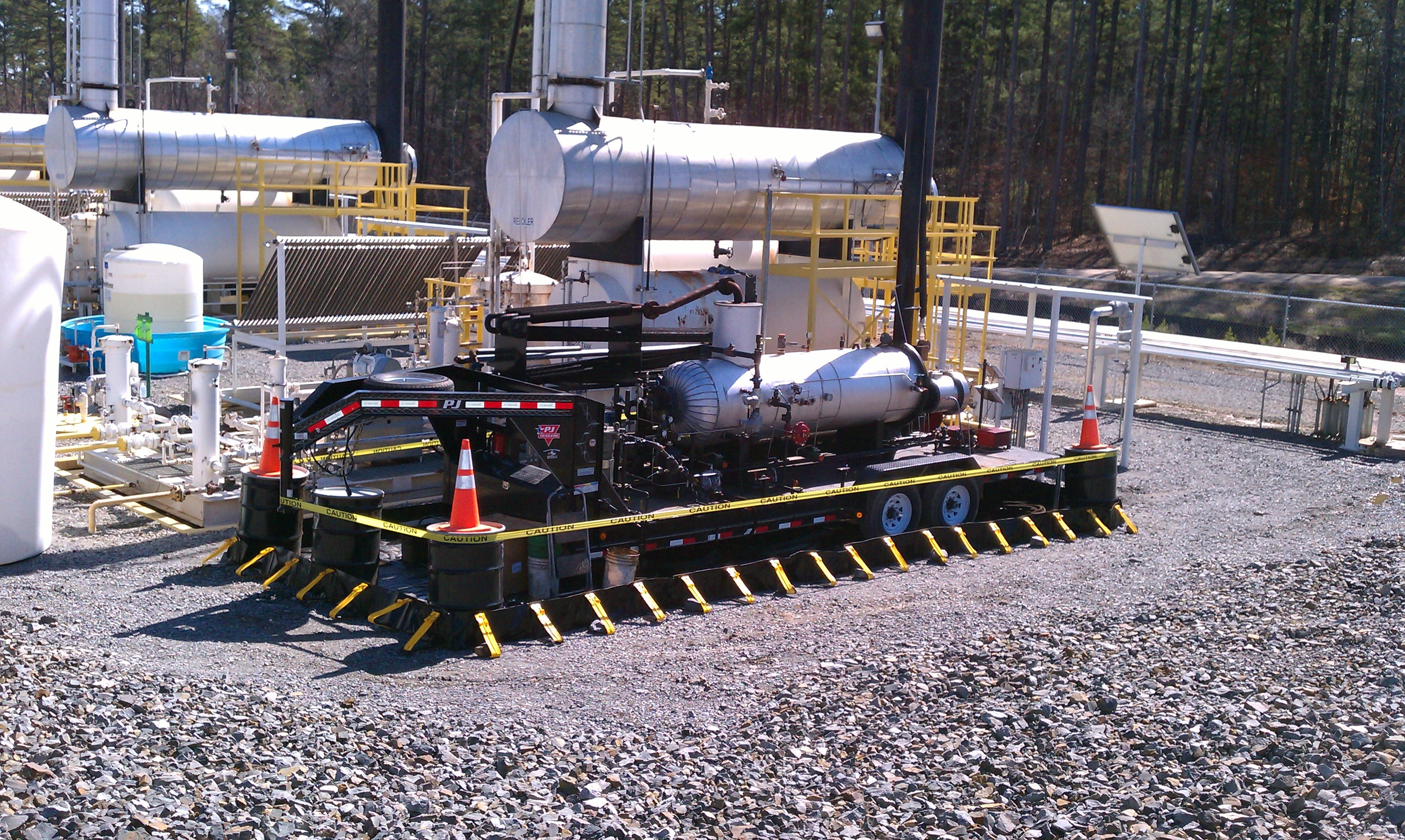
Portable spill containment around fracking equipment

Portable containment berms are essentially a basin that can catch many different types of hazardous liquids and chemicals. They are a form of secondary spill containment useful for containing mobile equipment such as oil drums, trucks, tankers and trailers. Unlike geotextile berms, portable berms usually do not solidify oil. Many companies involved in fracking use spill containment berms to capture contaminated water that is a by-product of the operation. Each well site has multiple trucks that transport water used in deep well drilling procedure.

== See also ==
- Bunding
