= Commonwealth Credit Union =

- Type: Credit union
- Industry: Financial services
- Founded: 1951
- Headquarters: Frankfort, Kentucky, United States
- Area served: Kentucky
- Key people: Karen Harbin, President and CEO
- Products: Savings; checking; consumer loans; business loans; mortgages; credit cards
- Total assets: $2.57B USD (2025)
- Number of employees: 358
- Website: ccuky.org

Commonwealth Credit Union is a state chartered credit union headquartered in Frankfort, Kentucky. It is regulated under the authority of the National Credit Union Administration (NCUA) of the U.S. federal government. Commonwealth Credit Union is the largest credit union in Kentucky and had $2.57 billion in assets, 130,000 members, and 17 branches as of March 2025.

Commonwealth's field of membership extends to anyone in Kentucky who is immediately family of current members, employees or members of certain employers and associations, and affiliated members of partner associations. Member deposits are insured up to $250,000 through the National Credit Union Share Insurance Fund, credit unions' equivalent to the Federal Deposit Insurance Corporation (FDIC).

== History ==
Commonwealth Credit Union was founded on April 2, 1951, with $2,700 in assets and 122 members. By 1976, membership had grown to nearly 6,000 and its assets to $2.8 million. Commonwealth absorbed the Kentucky Teachers and Associated Employees Credit Union in 1983.

Commonwealth hosts an annual charity run that benefits charities in Kentucky as well as an annual "Stuff the Bus" campaign to provide local schools with school supplies.

In November 2015, Commonwealth became the preferred credit union partner for the University of Louisville. In 2017, Commonwealth became the official credit union of Rupp Arena. In May 2025, Commonwealth Credit Union merged with Eastern Kentucky Federal Credit Union.
