= Outline of whisky =

Distilled alcoholic beverage

Whisky
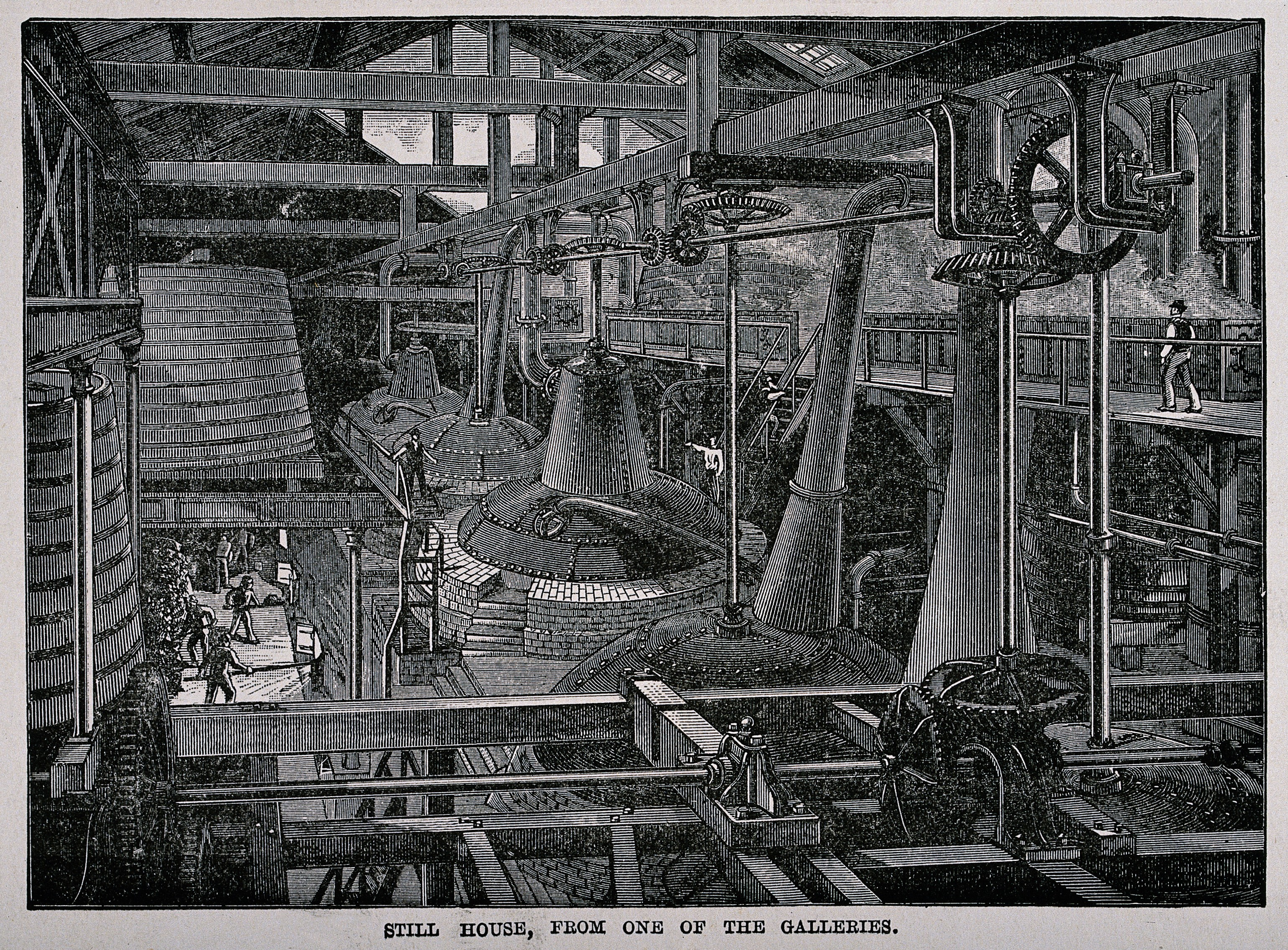
- A late 19th century whisky distillery
- Alcohol by volume: at least 40%
- Ingredients: Rye, Wheat, Barley, Corn, Malt, Peat, Oak, Water, Sugar maple

The following outline is provided as an overview of and topical guide to whisky:

Whisky (also "whiskey") – distilled alcoholic beverage made from fermented grain mash. Various grains (which may be malted) are used in different varieties, including barley, corn, rye, and wheat. Whisky is typically aged in wooden casks, generally made of charred white oak.

Whisky is a strictly regulated spirit worldwide. It encompasses many national expressions and variations. The typical unifying characteristics of the different expressions and variations are the fermentation of grains, distillation, and aging in wooden barrels.

The spelling whiskey is commonly used in Ireland and the United States, while whisky is used almost exclusively in other whisky-producing countries.

== National varieties ==
- American whiskeys are distilled from a fermented mash of cereal grain. It must have the taste, aroma, and other characteristics commonly attributed to whisky. American whisky must be distilled to no more than 80% alcohol by volume, and barrelled at no more than 125 proof. Only water may be added to the final product; the addition of colouring or flavouring is prohibited. These whiskies must be aged in new charred-oak containers, except for corn whisky, which does not have to be aged. If it is aged, it must be in uncharred oak barrels or in used barrels. Corn whisky is usually unaged and sold as a legal version of moonshine.
- Australian whiskies are mainly produced using a very similar process to that of Scottish whisky; however, the flavour of Australian whisky is subtly different. Although the majority of whisky produced in Australia is in the single malt style, there is more variation than that found overseas, with no strict customs or traditions governing the styles produced. Multiple styles of whisky are produced in Australia, including single malt, rye, wheat and blended whisky.
- Canadian whiskies are usually blended multi-grain whiskies containing a large percentage of corn spirits, and are typically lighter and smoother than other whisky styles. When Canadian distillers began adding small amounts of highly-flavourful rye grain to their mashes, people began demanding this new rye-flavoured whisky, referring to it simply as "rye". Today, as for the past two centuries, the terms "rye whisky" and "Canadian whisky" are used interchangeably in Canada.
- English whisky is made from cereal grains, malt and water and includes malt whisky and grain whisky. There are currently 71 whisky distilleries and 20 brands of whisky in England.
- Finnish whisky
- French whisky is traditionally made in Brittany from malted buckwheat.
- Georgian whisky was first made by Georgian wine-maker, co-founder of "Askaneli Brothers", Jimsher Chkhaidze. JIMSHER whisky is made by traditional Scottish method and other Georgia whiskies have followed suit.
- German whisky resemble those made in Ireland, Scotland and the United States: single malts, blends, wheat, and bourbon-like styles.
- Indian whiskies are commonly blends based on neutral spirits that are distilled from fermented molasses /Grain with only a small portion consisting of traditional malt whisky, usually about 10 to 12 percent. Outside India, such a drink would more likely be labelled a rum. According to the Scotch Whisky Association's 2013 annual report, "there is no compulsory definition of whisky in India, and the Indian voluntary standard does not require whisky to be distilled from cereals or to be matured." Molasses-based blends make up 90 percent of the spirits consumed as "whisky" in India,
- Irish whiskey is whiskey made on the island of Ireland. The word 'whiskey' (or whisky) comes from the Irish (or 'Gaelic') uisce beatha, meaning water of life. Irish whiskey has a smoother finish as opposed to the smoky, earthy overtones common to Scotch whisky, in part due to peating. Peat is rarely used in the malting process elsewhere. There are notable exceptions to these rules in both countries.
- Japanese whiskies are both single malt and blended whiskies. The base is a mash of malted barley, dried in kilns fired with a little peat (although less than is used for some peated Scotch whiskies), and is distilled using the pot still method.
- Mexican whisky
- Scotch whisky (Scottish Gaelic: uisge-beatha na h-Alba; often simply called whisky or Scotch) is malt whisky or grain whisky (or a blend of the two), made in Scotland. It must be made in a manner specified by law. There were 141 Scotch whisky distilleries operating in Scotland.
  - Single malt Scotch must have been distilled at a single distillery using a pot still distillation process and made from a mash of malted barley.

- Single grain Scotch is a Scotch whisky distilled at a single distillery but, in addition to water and malted barley, may involve whole grains of other malted or unmalted cereals. "Single grain" does not mean that only a single type of grain was used to produce the whisky, but that it was distilled at a single distillery.
- Blended malt Scotch whisky
- Blended grain Scotch whisky
- Blended Scotch whisky

- Taiwanese whisky
- Welsh whisky

== Types of whisky ==
- Blended malt whisky is a mixture of single malt whiskies from different distilleries. If a whisky is labelled "pure malt" or just "malt" it is almost certainly a blended malt whisky. This was formerly called a "vatted malt" whisky.
- Blended whisky is made from a mixture of different types of whisky. A blend may contain whisky from many distilleries so that the blender can produce a flavour consistent with the brand.
- Bourbon whiskey is made in the United States from mash that consists of at least 51% corn (maize) and is aged in new charred oak barrels.
- Buckwheat whisky is made entirely or principally from buckwheat.
- Cask strength (also known as barrel proof) is bottled from the cask undiluted or only lightly diluted.
- Corn whiskey is made from mash that consists of at least 80% corn and is not aged, or, if aged, is aged in uncharred or used barrels.
- Four grain whisky
- Grain whisky (or Light whisky) is made from any type of grain at more than 80% alcohol by volume and stored in used or uncharred new oak containers.
- Malt whisky is made from mash that consists of at least 51% malted barley.
- Millet Whisky
- Oat Whisky is made from a mash of oats.
- Rye malt whisky is made from mash that consists of at least 51% malted rye.
- Rye whisky is made from mash that consists of at least 51% rye.
- Single cask whisky (also known as single barrel) are whiskies bottled from an individual cask.
- Single malt whisky is whisky from a single distillery made from a mash that uses only one particular malted grain. Unless the whisky is described as single-cask, it contains whisky from many casks, and different years, so the blender can achieve a taste recognisable as typical of the distillery.
- Spirit whiskey is a mixture of neutral spirits and at least 5% of certain stricter categories of whisky
- Straight whisky is distilled from a fermented (malted or unmalted) cereal grain mash to a concentration not exceeding 80% alcohol by volume (abv) and aged in new charred oak barrels for at least two years at a concentration not exceeding 62.5% at the start of the aging process.
- Tennessee whiskey is straight whiskey produced in the U.S. state of Tennessee and uses a filtering step known as the Lincoln County Process.
- Wheat whiskey is made from mash that consists of at least 51% wheat.

== Individuals related to whisky ==
- Jasper Newton "Jack" Daniel was an American distiller and businessman, best known as the founder of the Jack Daniel's Tennessee whiskey distillery.
- George A. Dickel founded George A. Dickel and Company, a wholesaling firm which bought whiskey from regional distillers and distributed it in barrels, jugs and bottles.
- Nathan "Nearest" Green was a former slave and master distiller who taught distilling techniques to Jack Daniel
- John (Johnnie) Walker was a Scottish grocer, who originated what would become one of the world's most famous whisky brand names, Johnnie Walker.
- William Grant was a Scottish distiller and entrepreneur who founded William Grant & Sons, the manufacturer of Glenfiddich.

== Places related to whisky ==
=== North American ===
- George Washington's Distillery

=== Europe ===
- The Old Bushmills Distillery is a distillery in Bushmills, County Antrim, Northern Ireland and is the oldest operating whiskey distillery. The company that originally built the distillery was formed in 1784, although the date 1608 is printed on the label of the brand – referring to an earlier date when a royal licence was granted to a local landowner to distil whiskey in the area. After various periods of closure in its subsequent history, the distillery has been in continuous operation since it was rebuilt after a fire in 1885.
- Scotland was traditionally divided into four regions: The Highlands, The Lowlands, The Isle of Islay, and Campbeltown with a Speyside more recently. The whisky-producing islands other than Islay are not recognised as a distinct region by the Scotch Whisky Association, which groups them into the Highlands region. (Note: Although only five regions are specified, any Scottish locale may be used to describe a whisky if it is distilled entirely within that place; for example a single malt whisky distilled on Orkney could be described as Orkney Single Malt Scotch Whisky instead of as an Island whisky.)

- Campbeltown, a small western coastal town, was once home to over 30 distilleries but now has only three in operation.
- The Islands, an unrecognised sub-region of the Highlands, includes all of the whisky-producing islands but excludes Islay.
- Islay /ˈaɪlə/: is produced on the island of Islay, Scotland.
- The Highlands: The Highlands is by far the largest region in Scotland both in area and in whisky production. This massive area has over 30 distilleries on the mainland.
- The Lowlands district covers much of the Central Belt and the South of Scotland including Edinburgh & The Lothians, Glasgow & The Clyde Valley, the Kingdom of Fife, Ayrshire, Dumfries & Galloway and the Scottish Borders.
- Speyside: Speyside gets its name from the River Spey, which cuts through this region and provides water to many of the distilleries.

== Events related to whisky ==
=== United States ===
- Prohibition in the United States
- Whiskey Rebellion

== Creating Whisky ==
=== Ingredients ===
- Barley
- Charcoal
- Corn
- Malt
- Oak
- Peat
- Rye
- Sour mash
- Sugar maple
- Water
- Wheat

=== Chemistry ===
- Acetals
- Carbonyl group
- Carboxylic acid
- cis-3-Methyl-4-octanolide
- Coumarin
- Diacetyl
- Ester
- Lactone
- Naturally occurring phenols
- Scopoletin
- Syringaldehyde
- Tannin
- Terpene
- Vanillin

=== Processes ===
- Chill filtering
- Concentration
- Distillation
- Evaporation
- Extraction
- Fermentation in food processing
- Filtration
- Finishing (whisky)
- Lincoln County Process
- Mashing
- Redox

=== Equipment ===
- Column still
- Pot still
- Spirit safe
- Still
- Whiskey thief

=== Production ===
- Bottled in bond
- Cask strength
- Master blender
- Single barrel whiskey
- Small batch whiskey
- Straight whiskey

==== Distillers ====
- Independent bottler

===== Lists of distillers =====
- List of historic whisky distilleries
- List of whisky distilleries in Europe

- List of whisky distilleries in Scotland
- List of whiskey distilleries in Ireland

- List of whisky distilleries in North America

- List of whiskey distilleries in the United States

- List of whisky distilleries in South America
- List of whisky distilleries in Africa
- List of whisky distilleries in Asia and Oceania

==== Brands ====
- List of whisky brands

==== Laws and regulations ====
- Scotch Whisky Regulations 2009
- Volstead Act

== Community ==
- Scotch Whisky Association

=== Events and tourism ===
- American Whiskey Trail
- Kentucky Bourbon Trail
- Scotch Whisky Experience
- Scotland's Malt Whisky Trail

=== Magazines ===
- Whisky (magazine)
- Whisky Advocate (magazine)

=== Books ===
- Jim Murray's Whisky Bible
- World Atlas of Whisky

== Whisky Lists ==
- List of whisky brands
- List of historic whisky distilleries
- List of whisky Cocktails

== Gallery ==
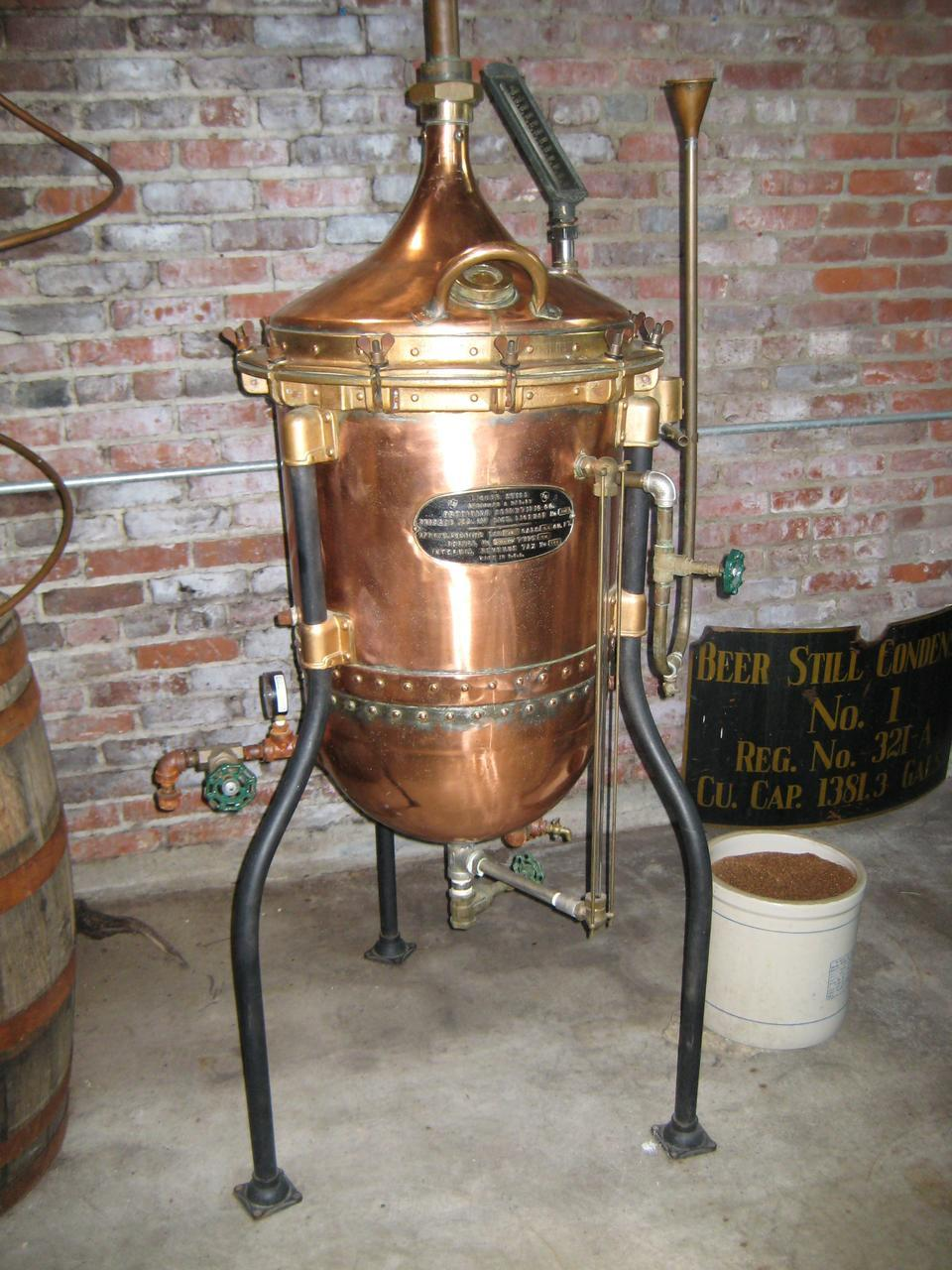
An old whisky still

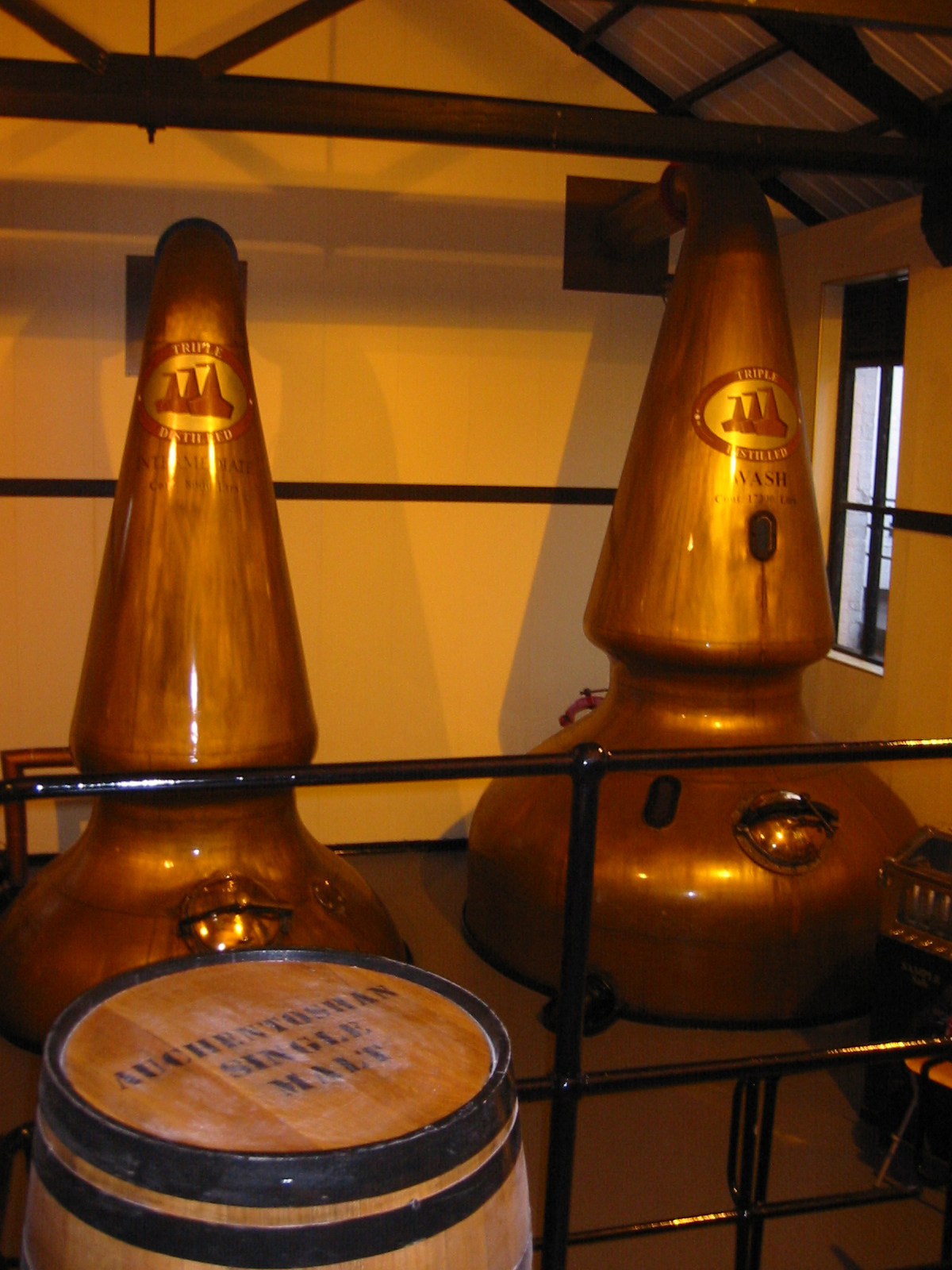
Copper pot stills at Auchentoshan Distillery in Scotland

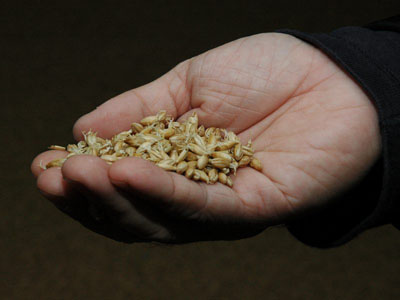
Malted barley is an ingredient of some whiskies.

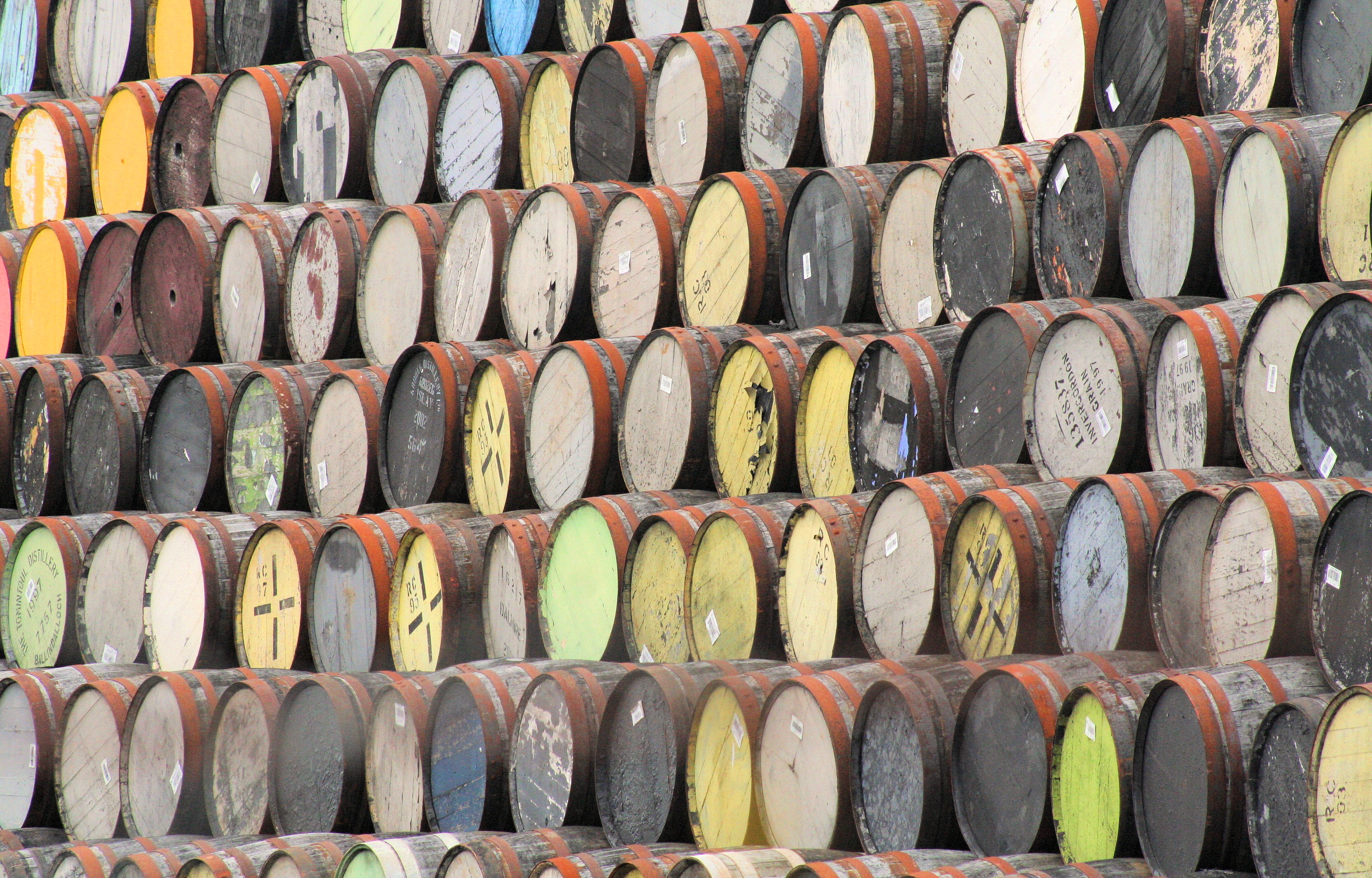
Empty oak barrels waiting to be filled with whisky at the White and MacKay distillery in Invergordon

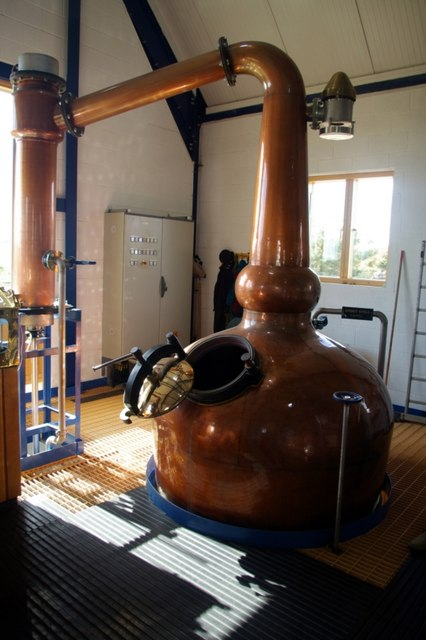
Spirit still at St George's whisky distillery in Norfolk

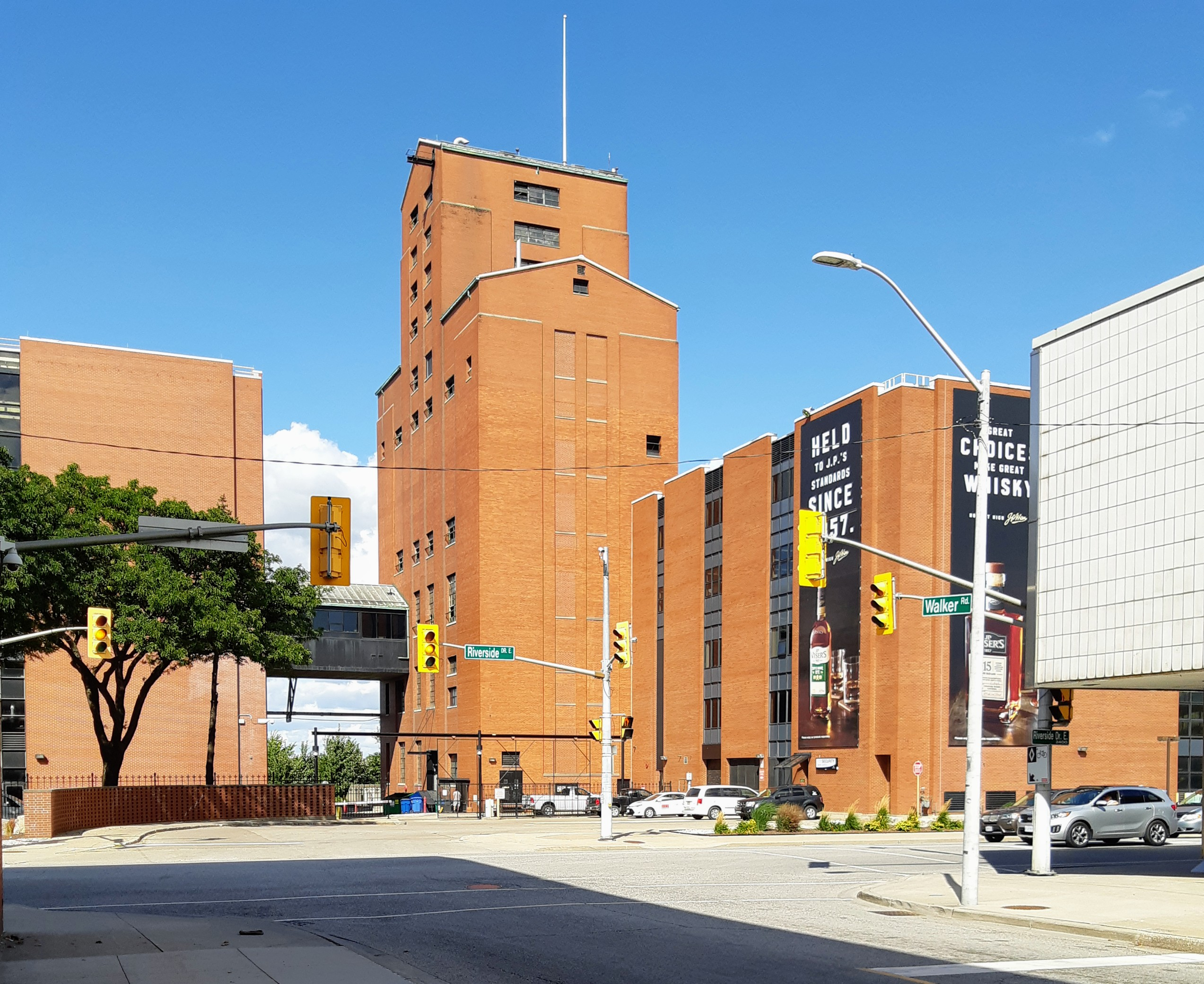
The Hiram Walker Distillery in Windsor, Ontario. Established in 1858, it is the oldest functioning distillery in the province.

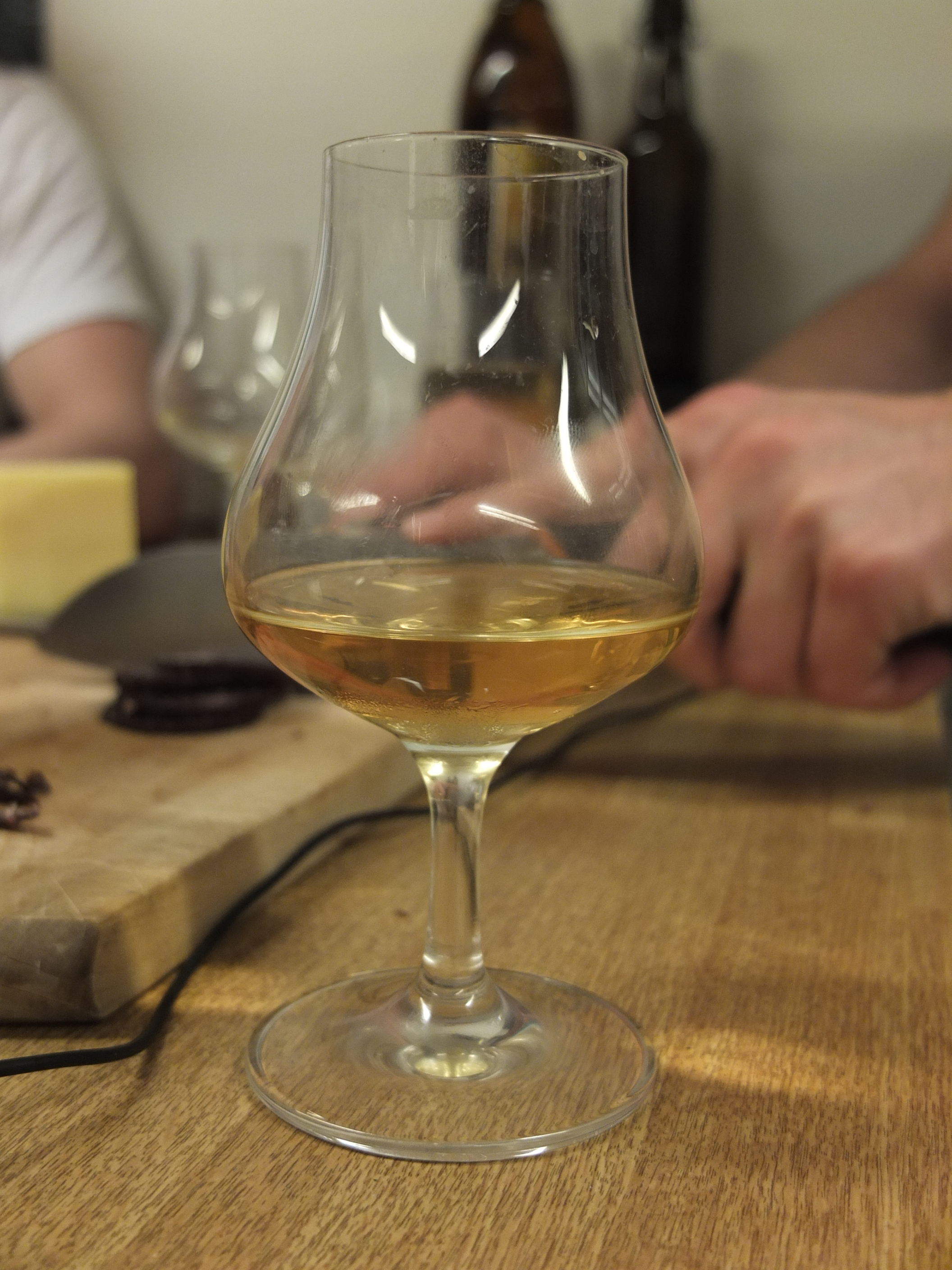
Scotch whisky

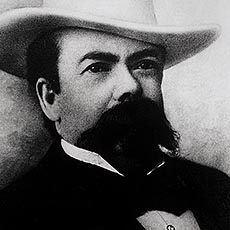
Jasper Newton "Jack" Daniel

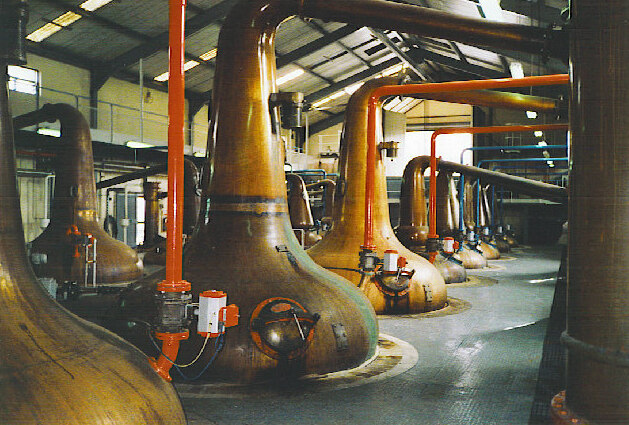
Glenfiddich Distillery stills

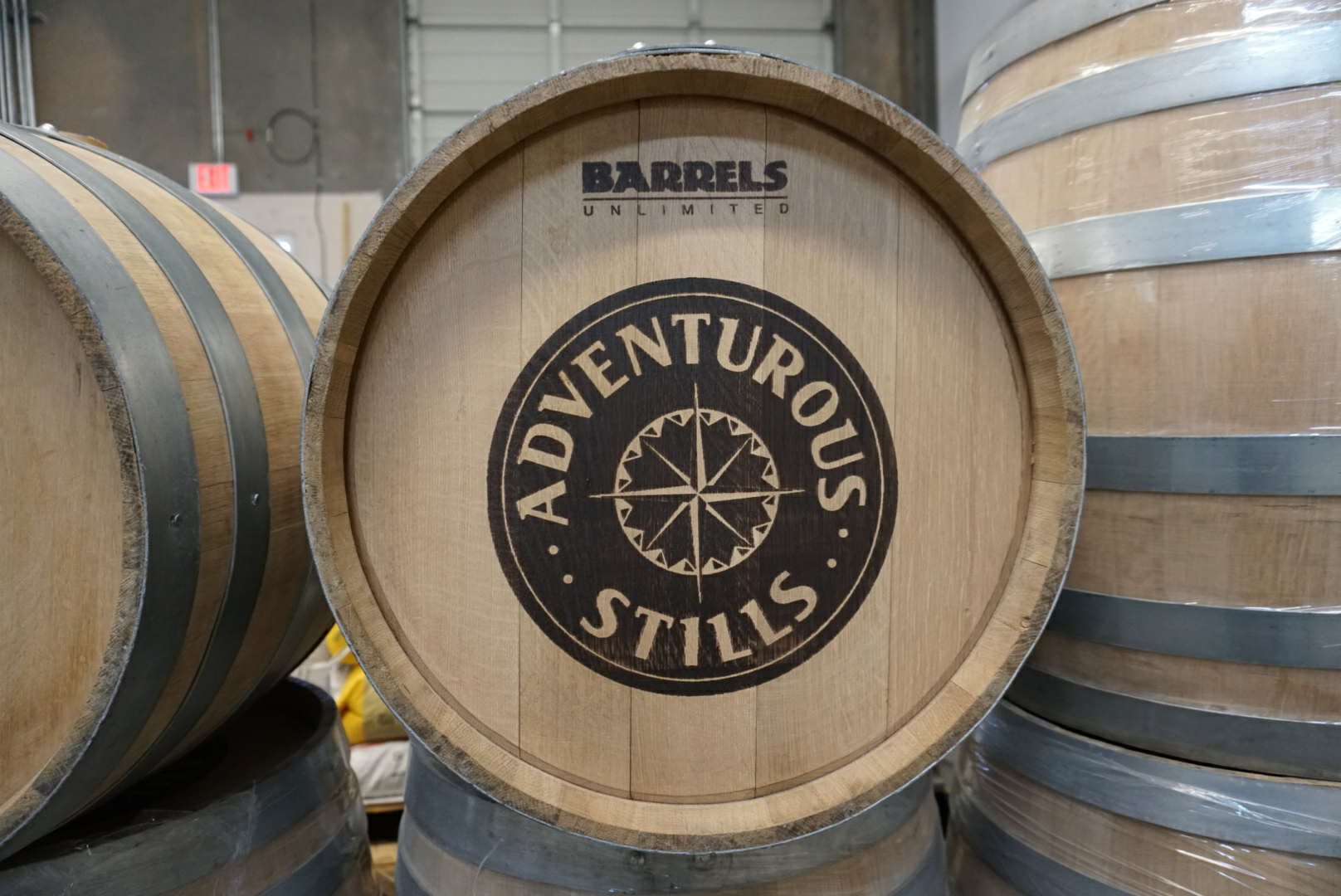
A charred oak barrel used to age whiskey

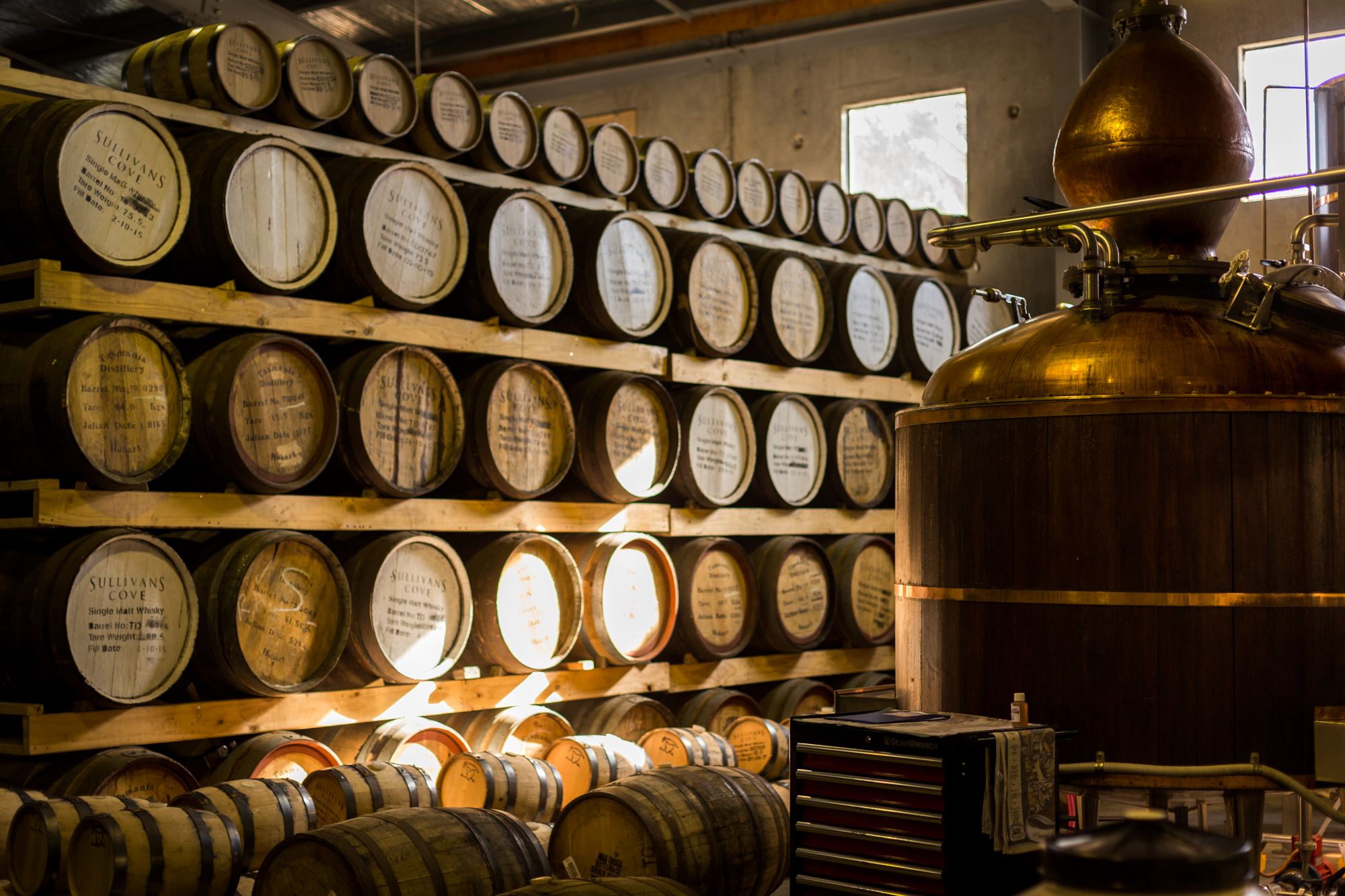
Inside Sullivans Cove distillery in Tasmania, Australia

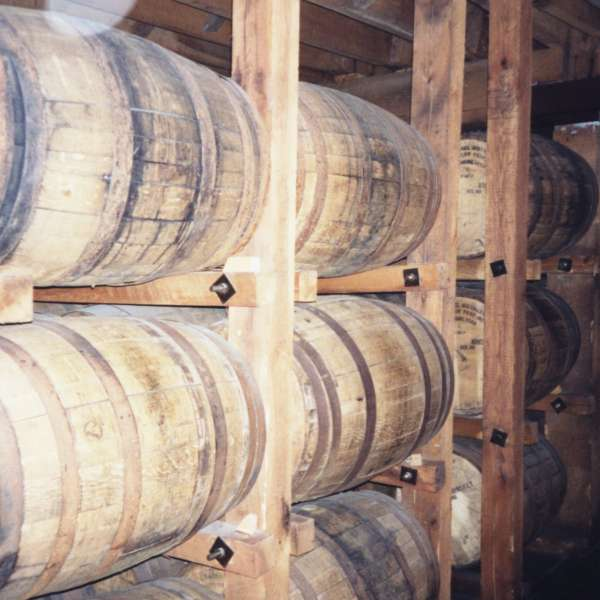
Tennessee whiskey aging in charred new oak barrels at the Jack Daniel's distillery

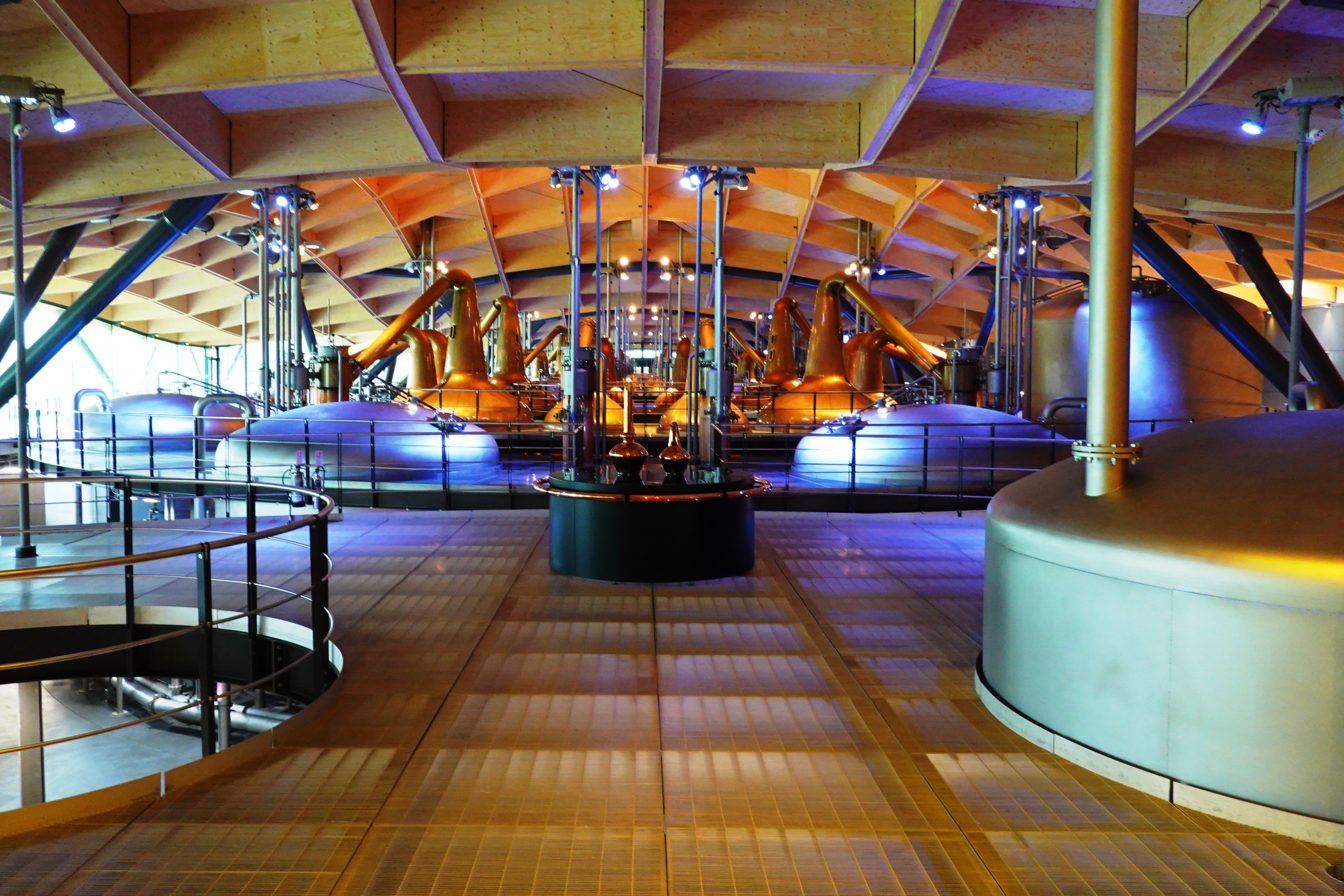
Macallan Distillery production hall

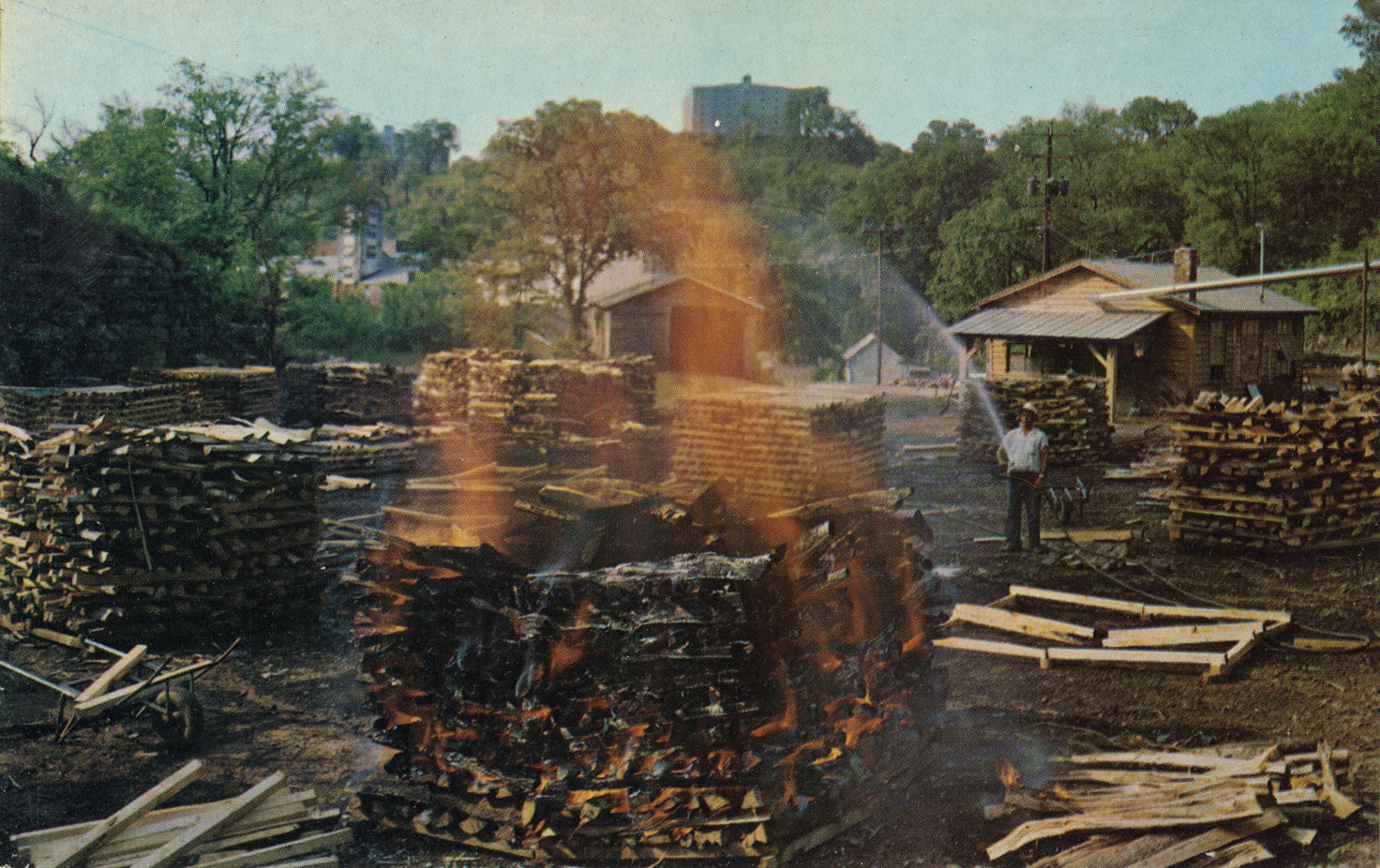
Making charcoal at the Jack Daniel Distillery

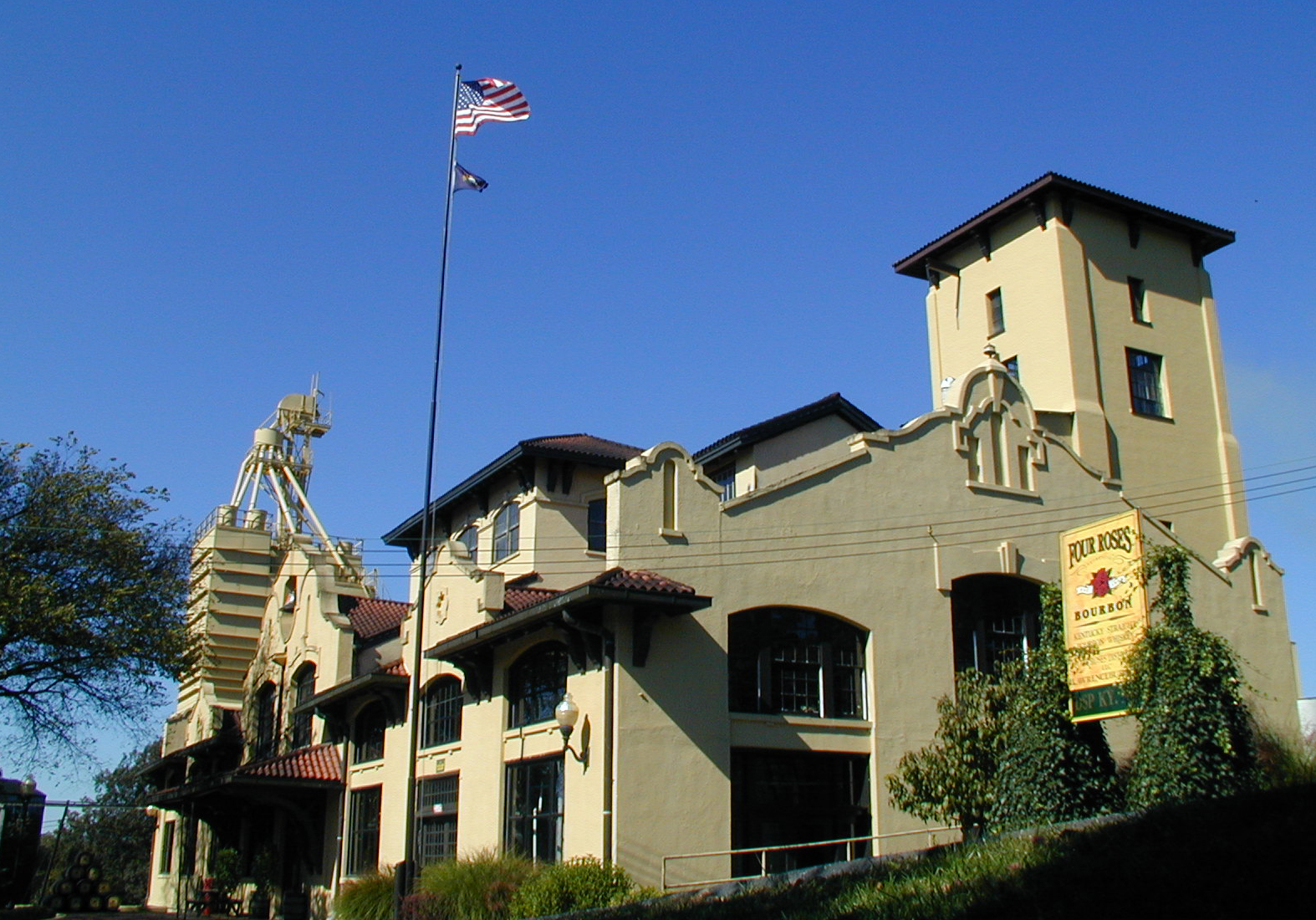
Four Roses Distillery

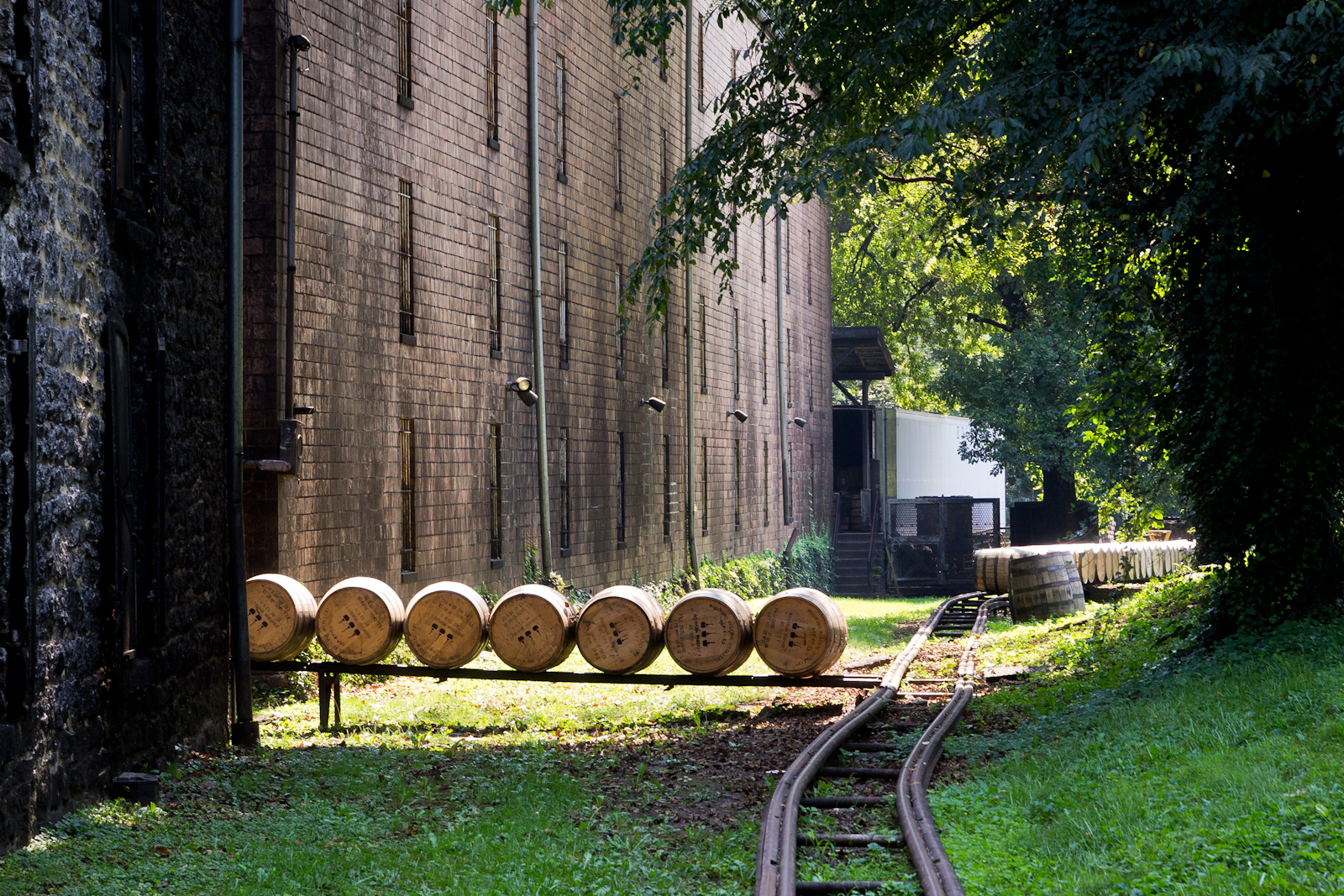
Recently filled barrels of Woodford Reserve bourbon outside of the rickhouse, where they will be stacked and stored during the aging process

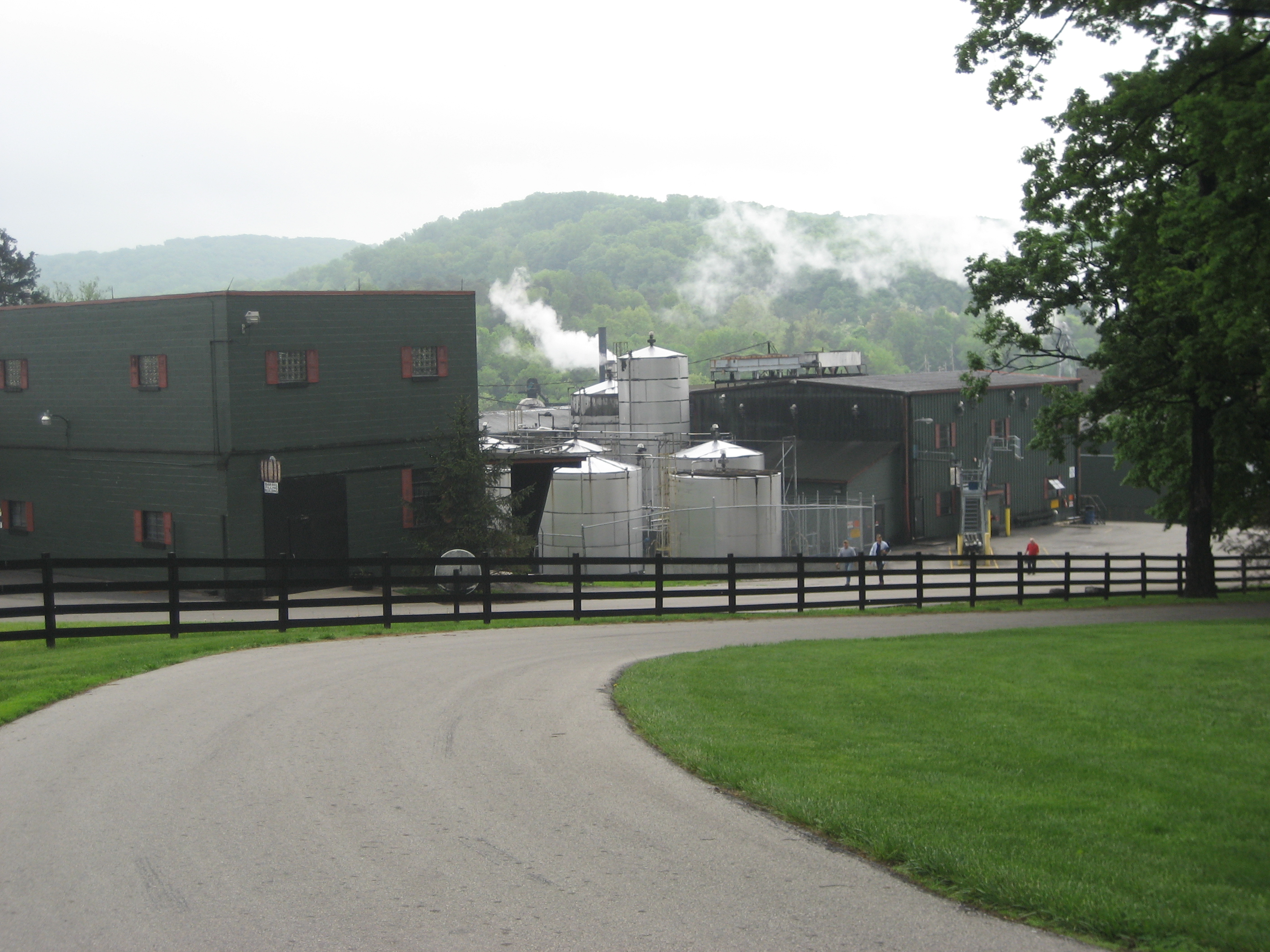
Jim Beam Distillery

== See also ==
- Alcohol by volume
- Alcohol proof
- Barrel
- Congener (beverages)
- Distilled Spirits Council of the United States
- Liquor
- Manx Spirit
- Moonshine
- Poitín
- Rectified spirit
- Sherry
