= Mexican whisky =

Mexican whiskey is a style of whisky distilled from corn developed and produced in Mexico. While Mexico does not have a long history of producing whisky, there has been a recent push to establish Mexico as a preeminent whisky country with a small group fostering the industry in the country.

== History ==
Whisky production in Mexico is almost non-existent with the first real Mexican whisky being produced in 2013. This is mainly due to the popularity of other distilled drinks such as tequila and mezcal in the country with the majority of whisky consumed in Mexico being imports from other countries.

Today, most of the Mexican whisky produced originates from Oaxaca in Sierra Norte where heirloom corn is used due to its distinct taste from regular GMO corn.

In 2019 Destileria y Bodega Abasolo, the first distillery dedicated entirely to the production of Mexican whisky, was completed in Jilotepec de Abasolo. Jilotepec is known as "the birthplace" of corn and Abasolo whisky is the first whisky made from 100% heirloom Mexican corn (Cacahuazintle) that has undergone nixtamalization, a 4,000 year old Mesoamerican process.

Despite the fact that the Mexican industry is relatively young, Mexican whisky has seen a rapid growth in popularity thanks in part to millennials who actively seek out new and different products and have helped to push the awareness of the country's whisky. The popularity of heirloom corn in the production has also helped it to become more in demand despite the rise of cheaper, mass-produced corn.

== See also ==
- List of whisky brands
- Outline of whisky
