= Malt whisky =

Alcohol beverage made from barley

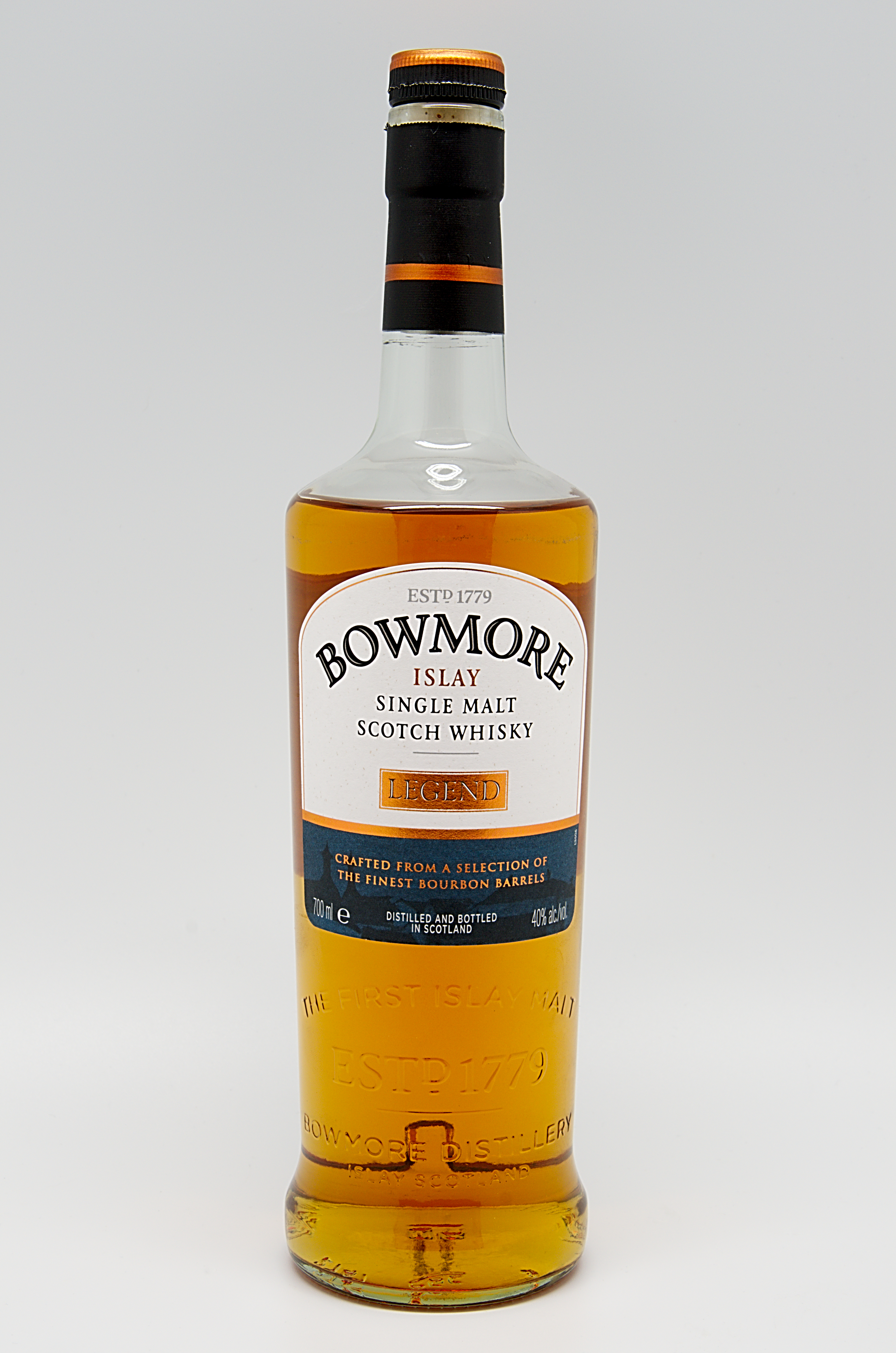
Bowmore single malt scotch whiskey

Malt whisky is whisky made from a fermented mash consisting of malted barley. If the product is made exclusively at a single distillery (along with other restrictions), it is typically called a single malt whisky. Although malt whisky can be made using other malted grains besides barley, those types are not called malt whisky without specifying the grain, such as rye malt whisky or buckwheat malt whisky.

== Laws ==
The exact definitions of "malt whisky" and "single malt whisky" and the restrictions governing their production vary according to regulations established by different jurisdictions for marketing whisky. For example, Scotch whisky regulations require malt whisky to be made in pot stills using water and malted barley without the addition of any other grains or cereals, and the whisky must be aged for at least three years in oak casks. The use of new barrels is not required. Caramel coloring can be added, but no other additives are allowed.

Irish whiskey regulations are almost identical to Scotch regulations. Malt whiskey must be distilled in a pot still from a mash of 100 % malted barley, which may be peated or unpeated in character, although unpeated malt is typically used. All Irish whiskeys must be matured for at least three years in wooden casks (which may have been previously used) and must contain a minimum of 40 % alcohol by volume, with caramel coloring as the only allowed additive. Single pot still whiskey, while also being primarily made from malted barley, is not called malt whisky because it contains unmalted barley. It is considered a separate category under Irish regulations.

In the United States Code of Federal Regulations, the Standards of Identity for Distilled Spirits define a "malt whisky" as a whisky produced at an alcohol by volume (ABV) level not exceeding 80 % from a fermented mash of not less than 51 % malted barley grain that is stored for aging in charred new oak containers at less than 62.5 % ABV. If such a whisky has been aged for at least two years, contains no added coloring and flavoring, and has not been blended with neutral spirits or other types of whisky, the adjective "straight" can be applied, as in straight malt whisky. A blended whisky that contains at least 51 % straight malt whisky may be labelled as blended malt whisky or malt whiskey – a blend.

Canadian whisky regulations allow the addition of flavoring agents as well as caramel coloring. There is no maximum limit on the alcohol level of the distillation or aging for Canadian whisky, so the distillate may be close to neutral before aging. Like the regulations for the aging of Irish and Scotch whisky, the aging requirement for Canadian whisky is three years, and the use of new barrels is not required.

== See also ==
- List of barley-based beverages
- Outline of whisky
