= Alcohol congener analysis =

Forensic toxicology method

Alcohol congener analysis of blood and urine is used to provide an indication of the type of alcoholic beverage consumed. The analysis involves investigating compounds called congeners that give the beverage a distinctive appearance, aroma, and flavour, not including water and ethanol.

== Use ==
The theory of discovering one's drinking habits has been investigated since the late 1970s, predominantly in Germany, for "hip-flask" defence cases (after-drinking). Alcohol congener analysis can play a crucial role in these cases where the driver is apprehended some time after a motor vehicle incident who, when returning a positive alcohol reading then claim that this is due to drinking an alcoholic beverage only after the incident. This traditional methodology for congener analysis has focused solely on the detection of fermentation by-product congeners that are found in all alcoholic beverages. By comparing the ratios of a set standard of congeners, the ingested alcoholic beverage type is proposed.

== Ingredient markers ==
Recently, a novel accompanying-alcohol analytic was developed that targets alcoholic-beverage-specific compounds sourced from the ingredients used during the production of the beverage. These markers should ideally be unique to that beverage and not found in other beverages, food, or in the environment. Beer ingestion can be confirmed from blood samples, by targeting iso-alpha-acids-type compounds that are derived from the hops used during the brewing process. Levels of these compounds have been found in blood several hours after ingestion in controlled drinking studies using "high-" and "low-hopped" beers. This methodology presents new possibilities for accompanying-alcohol analysis as ingredient-specific markers are developed for other alcohol beverages, e.g. wine and spirits.
