= Whisky =

Distilled alcoholic beverage

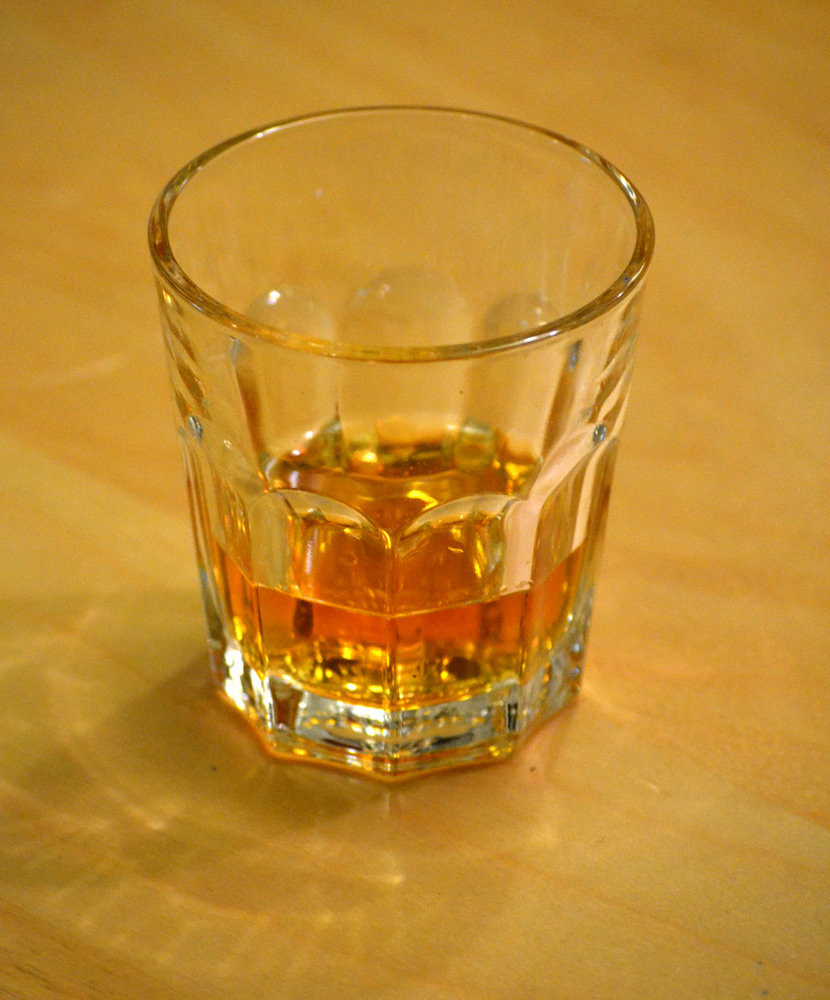
- A glass of Scotch whisky
- Type: Distilled beverage
- Introduced: 13th–15th century
- Alcohol by volume: At least 40% (37% in Australia, 43% in South Africa)
- Proof (US): 80 and higher
- Colour: Pale gold to dark amber
- Ingredients: Malt, water
- Variants: American whiskey; Bourbon whiskey; Canadian whisky; English whisky; Indian whisky; Irish whiskey; Japanese whisky; New world whisky; Scotch whisky; Taiwanese whisky; Tennessee whiskey; Welsh whisky

Whisky or whiskey is a type of liquor made from fermented grain mash. Various grains (which may be malted) are used for different varieties, including barley, corn, rye, and wheat. Whisky is typically aged in wooden casks, commonly of charred white oak. Uncharred white oak casks previously used for the aging of port, rum, or sherry may be employed during storage to impart a unique flavour and colour.

Whisky is a strictly regulated spirit worldwide with many classes and types. The typical unifying characteristics of the different classes and types are the fermentation of grains, distillation, and aging in wooden casks.

== Etymology ==
The word whisky (or whiskey) is an anglicisation of the Classical Gaelic word uisce (or uisge) meaning "water" (now written as uisce in Modern Irish, and uisge in Scottish Gaelic). This Gaelic word shares its ultimate origins with Germanic water and Slavic voda of the same meaning. Distilled alcohol was known in Latin as aqua vitae ("water of life"). This was translated into Middle Irish as uisce betha[d], which became uisce beatha (Irish pronunciation: [ˈɪʃcə ˈbʲahə]) in Irish and uisge beatha [ˈɯʃkʲə ˈbɛhə] in Scottish Gaelic. Early forms of the word in English included uskebeaghe (1581), usquebaugh (1610), usquebath (1621), and usquebae (1715).

=== Names and spellings ===
Much is made of the word's two spellings: whisky and whiskey. There are two schools of thought on the issue. One is that the spelling difference is simply a matter of regional language convention for the spelling of a word, indicating that the spelling varies depending on the intended audience or the background or personal preferences of the writer (like the difference between color and colour; or recognize and recognise), and the other is that the spelling should depend on the style or origin of the spirit being described. There is general agreement that when quoting the proper name printed on a label, one should not alter its spelling.

The spelling whiskey is common in Ireland and the United States, while whisky is used in all other whisky-producing countries. In the US, the usage has not always been consistent. From the late eighteenth century to the mid-twentieth century, US publications used both spellings interchangeably until the introduction of newspaper style guides. Since the 1960s, American writers have increasingly used whiskey as the accepted spelling for aged grain spirits made in the US and whisky for aged grain spirits made outside the US. However, some US brands, such as George Dickel, Maker's Mark, and Old Forester (all made by different companies), use the whisky spelling on their labels, and the Standards of Identity for Distilled Spirits, the legal regulations for spirit in the US, also use the whisky spelling throughout.

=== Scotch ===
Whisky made in Scotland is simply called whisky within Scotland. Elsewhere and in the regulations of the Scotch Whisky Association (SWA) that govern its production, it is commonly called Scotch whisky or simply Scotch (especially in North America). It is legally required that Scotch whisky be distilled and matured in oak casks in Scotland for a minimum of three years, under strict regulations that protect its designation and quality.

== History ==
=== Early distilling ===
It is possible that distillation was practised by the Babylonians in Mesopotamia in the 2nd millennium BC, with perfumes and aromatics being distilled, but this is subject to uncertain and disputed interpretations of evidence.

The earliest certain chemical distillations were by Greeks in Alexandria in the 1st century AD, but these were not distillations of alcohol. The medieval Arabs adopted the distillation technique of the Alexandrian Greeks, and written records in Arabic begin in the 9th century, but again these were not distillations of alcohol. Distilling technology passed from the medieval Arabs to the medieval Latins, with the earliest records in Latin in the early 12th century.

The earliest records of the distillation of alcohol are in Italy in the 13th century, where alcohol was distilled from wine. An early description of the technique was given by Ramon Llull (1232–1315). Its use spread through medieval monasteries, largely for medicinal purposes, such as the treatment of colic and smallpox.

=== Ireland and Scotland ===
The practice of distillation had spread to Ireland by the 12th century and Scotland by the 15th century, as did the common European practice of distilling aqua vitae, a spirit alcohol, primarily for medicinal purposes. The practice of medicinal distillation eventually passed from a monastic setting to the secular via professional medical practitioners of the time, the Guild of Barber-Surgeons. The earliest mention of whiskey in Ireland comes from the Annals of Clonmacnoise, which attributes the death of a chieftain in 1405 to "taking a surfeit of aqua vitae" at Christmas. In Scotland, the first evidence of whisky production comes from an entry in the Exchequer Rolls for 1495 where malt is sent "To Friar John Cor, by order of the king, to make aquavitae", enough to make about 500 bottles.

James IV of Scotland (r. 1488–1513) reportedly had a great liking for Scotch whisky, and in 1506 the town of Dundee purchased a large amount of whisky from the Guild of Barber-Surgeons, which held the monopoly on production at the time.

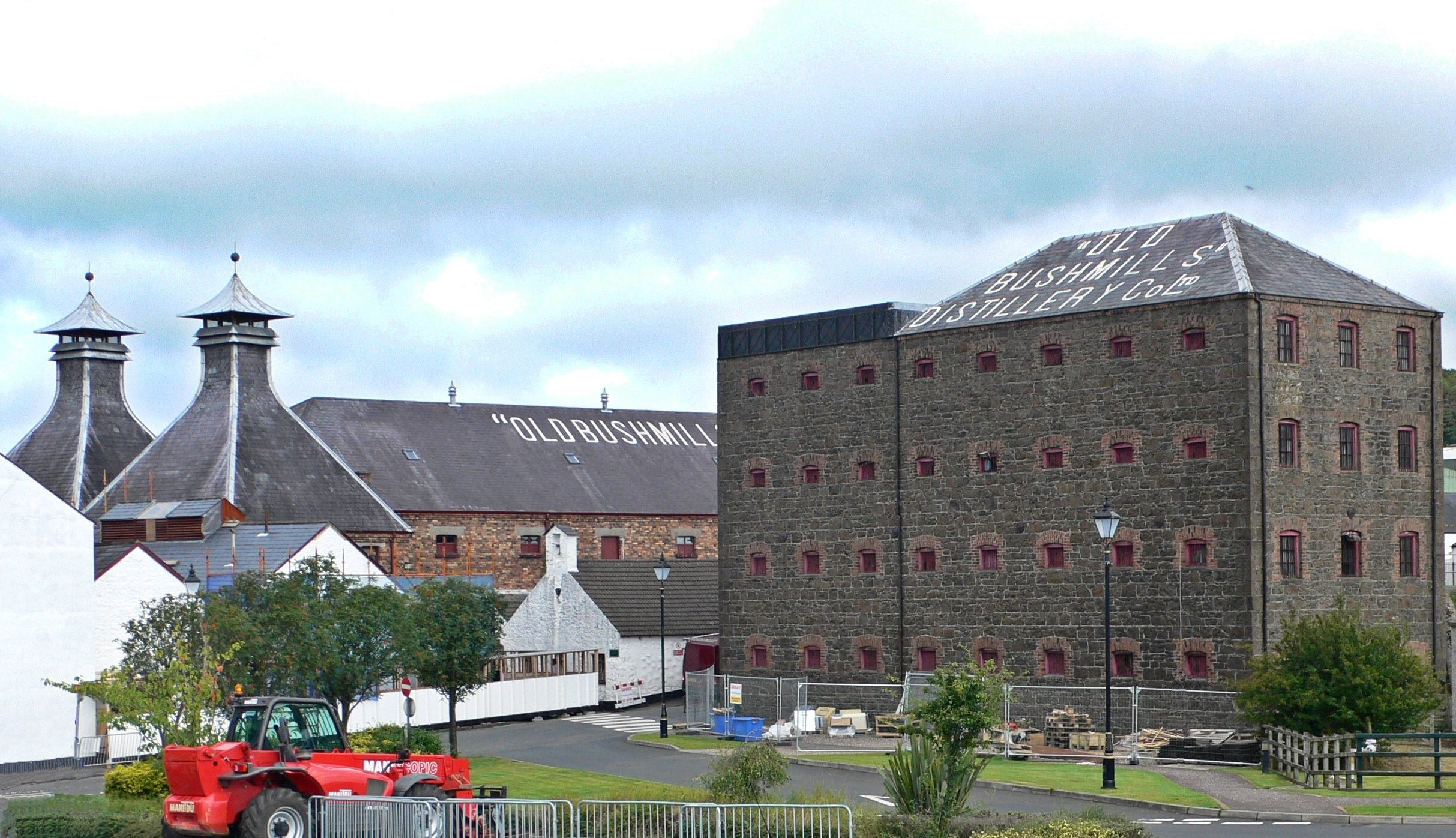
Old Bushmills Distillery, County Antrim

At this time, the distillation process was still in its infancy; whisky was not aged in barrels, and as a result, it had a sharp, unrefined flavour and a high alcohol content. It was consumed without dilution and lacked the smoother, more balanced characteristics that aging would later introduce. Over time, both production methods and consumer tastes evolved, leading to the development of the more refined and palatable whisky.

=== 18th century ===
In 1707, the Acts of Union merged England and Scotland into the Kingdom of Great Britain, and thereafter taxes on distilled spirits rose dramatically. Following parliament's divisive malt tax of 1725, most of Scotland's distillation was either shut down or forced underground. Scotch whisky was hidden under altars, in coffins, and in any available space to avoid the governmental excisemen or revenuers. Scottish distillers, operating out of homemade stills, took to distilling whisky at night when the darkness hid the smoke from the stills. At one point, it was estimated that over half of Scotland's whisky output was illegal.

In North America, whisky was used as currency during the late 18th century; George Washington operated a large distillery at Mount Vernon with hired and enslaved workers. Given the distances and primitive transportation network of colonial America, farmers often found it easier and more profitable to convert corn to whisky and transport it to market in that form. It also was a highly coveted trade good, and when an additional excise tax was levied against it in 1791, the Whiskey Rebellion erupted.

=== 19th century ===
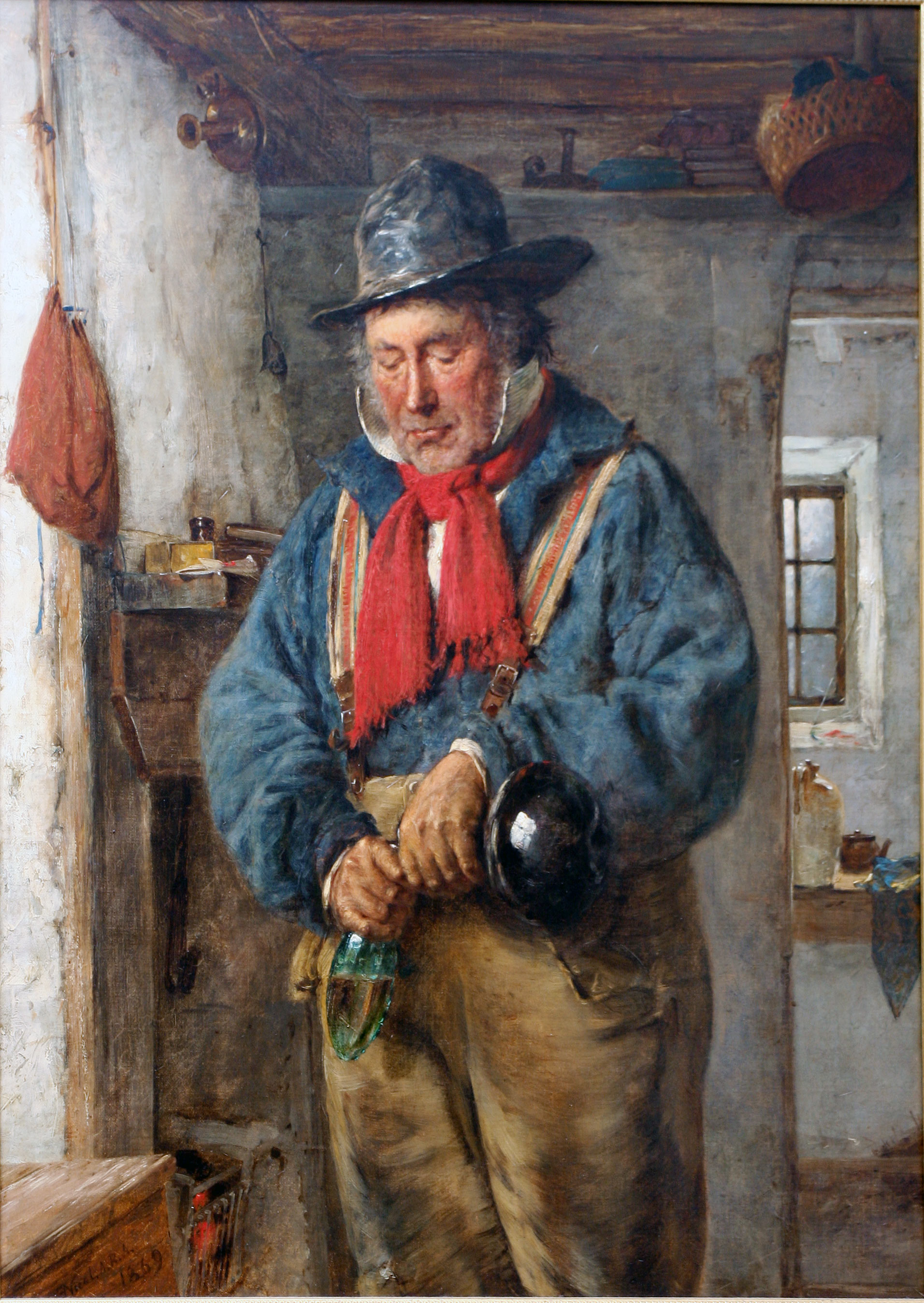
A man pours some whisky into a flask in this 1869 oil painting by Scottish artist Erskine Nicol.

Scottish whisky was introduced to the British raj in India in the nineteenth century. The first distillery in India was founded by Edward Dyer at Kasauli in the late 1820s. The distillery was relocated to nearby Solan (close to the British summer capital Shimla), as there was an abundant supply of fresh spring water there. In 1823, the UK passed the Excise Act, legalising distillation (for a fee), and this put a practical end to the large-scale production of home distilled whisky.

In 1831, Aeneas Coffey patented the Coffey still, allowing for a cheaper and more efficient distillation of whisky. In 1850, Andrew Usher began producing a blended whisky that mixed traditional pot still whisky with that from the new Coffey still. The new distillation method was scoffed at by some Irish distillers, who clung to their traditional pot stills. Many Irish contended that the new product was, in fact, not whisky at all.

in the 1830s and 1840s, the city of Saint Paul, Minnesota, was formed around an illicit whiskey distillery run by Pierre Parrant inside a cave that served US Army soldiers at Fort Snelling and Native American warriors who had fought them during the Dakota War of 1862. By the 1880s, the French brandy industry was devastated by the phylloxera pest that devastated much of the grape crop; as a result, whisky became the primary spirit in many markets.

=== 20th century ===
During the Prohibition era in the United States lasting from 1920 to 1933, all alcohol sales were banned in the country. The federal government made an exemption for whisky prescribed by a doctor and sold through licensed pharmacies, such as Walgreens.

== Production ==
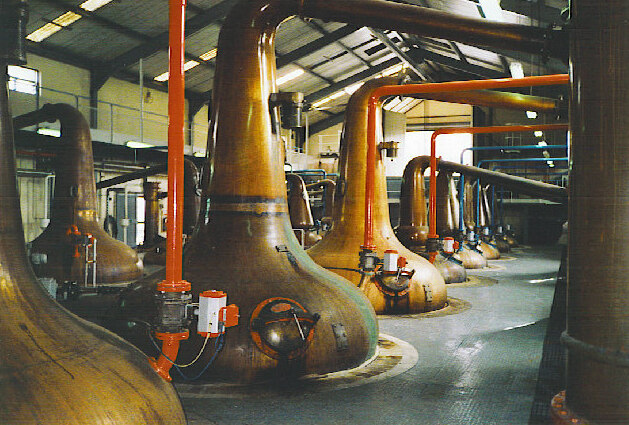
The production of whisky from barley to bottle (top), swan necked copper stills in the Glenfiddich distillery (bottom)

Although specific methods may vary among distilleries, whisky production broadly comprises four primary stages: grain preparation, fermentation, distillation, and maturation (aging). This process is typically followed by the two additional stages of bottling and marketing.

=== Grain preparation ===
To initiate whisky production, grains are processed to convert their starches into fermentable sugars, which can then be subjected to fermentation and distillation. This process involves malting, milling and mashing the grains.

==== Malting ====
Malt production begins with the soaking of grains in water tanks for a period of three days. The soaked grains are then transferred to large containers where germination occurs, initiating the metabolic process that converts starches into sugars. This process is subsequently halted by drying the grains with hot air, a procedure also known as kilning, at the end of which the product is malt. In the production of Scotch whisky, the air used for kilning is heated by burning peat bricks in a furnace, imparting the characteristic smoky flavour to the malt. The primary purpose of malting is to develop the natural enzymes needed to convert the grain's starches into fermentable sugars during mashing. Today, many distilleries use commercially produced enzymes instead of relying on malted grain, allowing them to use unmalted grains while still achieving efficient starch conversion.

==== Milling ====
Following the malting process, the grains are transferred to a dressing machine, which separates the sprouts from the seeds. The grains are then conveyed to a mill for grinding.

==== Mashing ====
The extraction of sugars to be converted into alcohol is achieved through a process known as mashing. During mashing, the diastase enzyme is activated, which facilitates the conversion of starches and dextrins into sugars. The ground malt is introduced into a mashtun, a large vat containing hot water, and is agitated for approximately thirty minutes or more. The water is then drained from the mashtun, which is subsequently refilled with hot water. This procedure is typically repeated between one and three times. Once complete, the resulting liquid, known as wort, which contains the extracted sugars, is separated from the mash, cooled, and transferred to the washbacks, or fermenting vats.

=== Fermentation ===
During fermentation, a specific strain of yeast, Saccharomyces cerevisiae (commonly known as "brewer's yeast"), is introduced to the sugary wort, which provides the necessary nutrients for its asexual reproduction. The yeast metabolizes the sugars, producing alcohol, carbon dioxide, and congeners, which can influence the flavour profile of the whisky, either enhancing or suppressing desirable characteristics. The fermenting vats are maintained within a controlled temperature range, typically between 10 and 37.8 °C (50 and 100 °F) which is optimal for yeast activity. Distillers ensure consistency by using the same yeast strain to achieve uniformity in the final whiskey product. Fermentation continues for two days or longer until the alcohol content of the liquid reaches between 5% and 10%.

Once fermentation is complete, and the yeast ceases to be active, the resulting liquid is referred to as wash or distiller's beer. Even though the wash is alcoholic it is still organic, which makes it susceptible to contamination by microorganisms that cause rot. Consequently, it is promptly transferred to the still for boiling to mitigate this risk.

=== Distillation ===
The decision to transfer either the entire wash or only the most liquid portion into the still is at the discretion of the distiller, and each choice affects the flavour profile of the final product in distinct ways. Following the transfer of the wash, the still is heated to a temperature sufficient to evaporate the alcohol while remaining low enough to prevent the evaporation of water. Alcohol vapour ascends through the still and is directed to the condenser, which consists of copper tubes or plates, where it condenses back into a liquid form known as the distilled spirit. This distilled spirit is meticulously monitored during its extraction. The initial and final portions of the distillate are deemed undesirable and are therefore redirected back into the still. Only the middle portion, considered the most desirable, is collected in the spirits receiver.

At this stage, the distilled spirit is clear and has an ethanol content ranging from 70% to 80% ABV. It is typically diluted before being transferred to casks for maturation, though some distilleries sell it as is at 'cask strength'.

A still for making whisky is usually made of copper, since it removes sulfur-based compounds from the alcohol that would make it unpleasant to drink. Modern stills are made of stainless steel with copper innards (piping, for example, will be lined with copper along with copper plate inlays along still walls). The simplest standard distillation apparatus is commonly known as a pot still, consisting of a single heated chamber and a vessel to collect purified alcohol.

Column stills are frequently used in the production of grain whisky and are the most commonly used type of still in the production of bourbon and other American whiskeys. Column stills behave like a series of single pot stills, formed in a long vertical tube. Whereas a single pot still charged with wine might yield a vapour enriched to 40–60% alcohol, a column still can achieve a vapour alcohol content of 95.6%; an azeotropic mixture of alcohol and water.

=== Maturation (Aging) ===
Whisky aging in casks in Canada

Whiskies do not mature in the bottle, only in the cask, so the "age" of a whisky is only the time between distillation and bottling. This reflects how much the cask has interacted with the whisky, changing its chemical makeup and taste. Whiskies that have been bottled for many years may have a rarity value, but are not older and not necessarily better than a more recent whisky that matured in wood for a similar time. After a decade or two, additional aging in a barrel does not necessarily improve a whisky, and excessive aging will even affect it negatively. The minimum aging period required for whisky varies by country. In the United States, the minimum aging requirement is typically 2 years, while in Scotland, Ireland, Japan, and Canada, it is generally 3 years.

While aging in wooden casks, especially American oak and French oak casks, whisky undergoes six processes that contribute to its colour and final flavour: extraction, evaporation, oxidation, concentration, filtration, and colouration. Extraction in particular results in whisky acquiring a number of compounds, including aldehydes and acids such as vanillin, vanillic acid, and syringaldehyde. The casks used for aging bourbon whiskey are required to be new (and charred); after being used for this purpose, these casks are typically exported for use in the aging of other whiskies elsewhere. Distillers will sometimes age their whisky in barrels previously used to age other spirits, such as port, rum or sherry, to impart particular flavours. The size of the barrel also has an effect on the flavour development of the whisky, smaller barrels will contribute more to the whisky due to the higher wood surface to whisky ratio.

During maturation, up to 45 litres or 12 US gallons of whisky may evaporate from the cask over a 4-year period. This portion is called the angel's share by distillers.

=== Packaging ===
Most whiskies are sold at or near an alcoholic strength of 40% abv, which is the statutory minimum in some countries – although the strength can vary, and cask-strength whisky may have as much as twice that alcohol percentage. Enthusiasts often prefer cask strength whisky for its concentrated flavours and customizable dilution experience.

=== Exports ===
The UK exports more whisky than the rest of the world combined. In 2022, whisky exports from Scotland were valued at £6.25 billion, making up a quarter of all UK food and drink export revenues. In 2012, the US was the largest market for Scotch whisky (£655 million), followed by France (£535 million). It is also one of the UK's overall top five manufacturing export earners and it supports around 42,000 jobs. Principal whisky producing areas include Speyside and the Isle of Islay, where there are nine distilleries providing a major source of employment. In many places, the industry is closely linked to tourism, with many distilleries also functioning as attractions worth £30 million GVA each year.

In 2011, 70% of Canadian whisky was exported, with about 60% going to the US, and the rest mostly to Europe and Asia. 15 million cases of Canadian whisky were sold in the US in 2011.

== Types ==
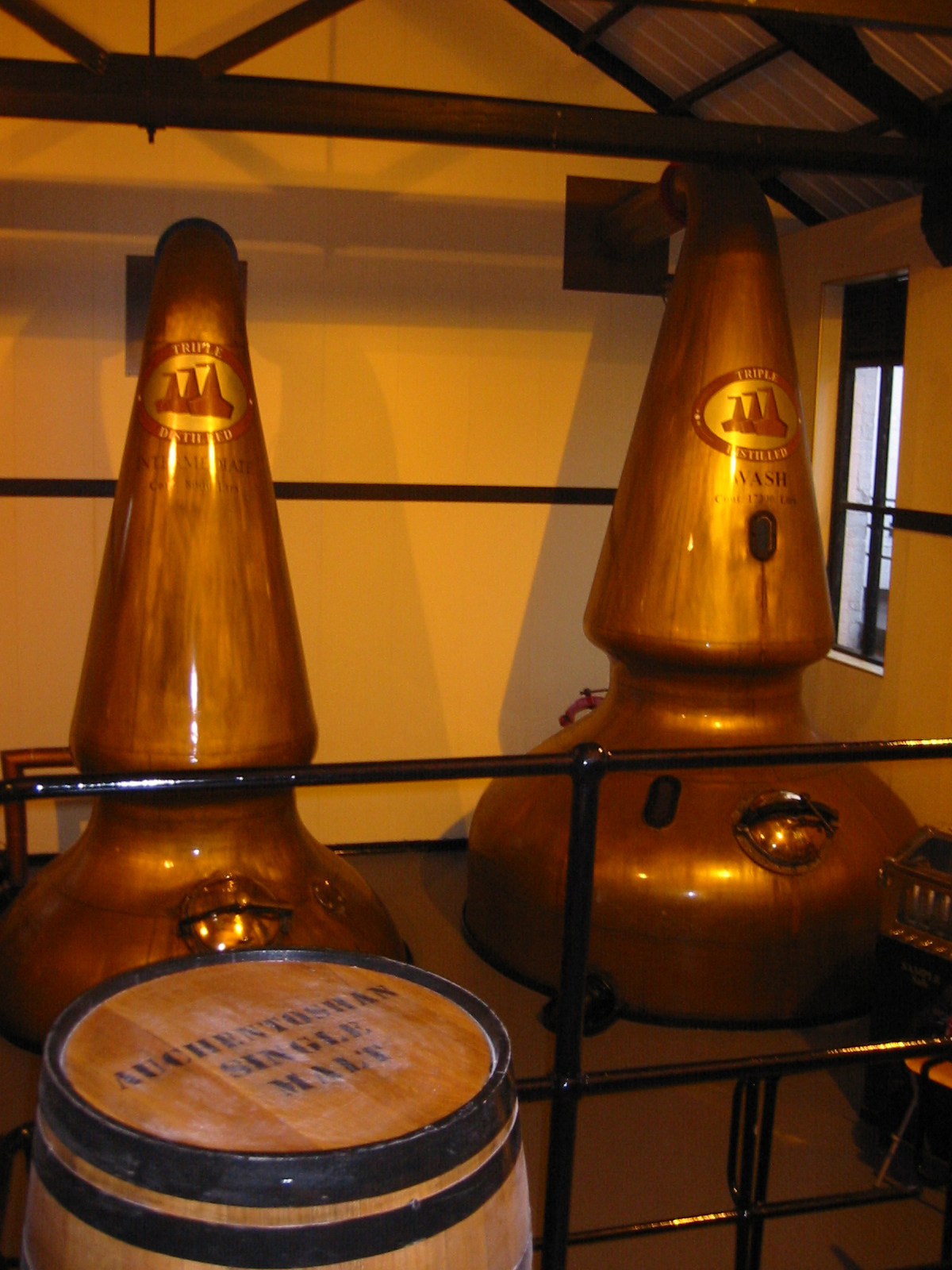
Copper pot stills at Auchentoshan Distillery in Scotland

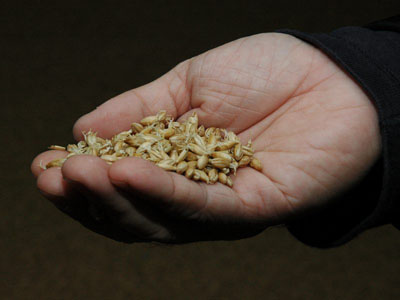
Malted barley is an ingredient of some whiskies.

Whisky or whisky-like products are produced in most grain-growing areas. They differ in base product, alcoholic content, and quality.

- Malt whisky – made from malted barley
- Grain whisky – made from any type of grain

Malts and grains are combined in various ways:

- Single malt whisky is whisky from a single distillery made from a mash that uses only one particular malted grain. Unless the whisky is described as single-cask, it contains whisky from many casks, and different years, so the blender can achieve a taste recognisable as typical of the distillery. In most cases, single malts bear the name of the distillery, with an age statement and perhaps some indication of some special treatments, such as maturation in a port wine cask.
- Blended malt whisky is a mixture of single malt whiskies from different distilleries. If whisky is labelled "pure malt" or just "malt" it is almost certainly a blended malt whisky. This was formerly called a "vatted malt" whisky.
- Blended whisky is made from a mixture of different types of whisky. A blend may contain whisky from many distilleries so that the blender can produce a flavour consistent with the brand. The brand name may, therefore, omit the name of a distillery. Most Scotch, Irish and Canadian whisky is sold as part of a blend, even when the spirits are the product of one distillery, as is common in Canada. American blended whisky may contain neutral spirits.
- Cask strength (also known as barrel proof) whiskies are rare, and usually, only the very best whiskies are bottled in this way. They are bottled from the cask undiluted or only lightly diluted.
- Single cask (also known as single barrel) whiskies are bottled from an individual cask, and often the bottles are labelled with specific barrel and bottle numbers. The taste of these whiskies may vary substantially from cask to cask within a brand.

== National varieties ==
=== American ===
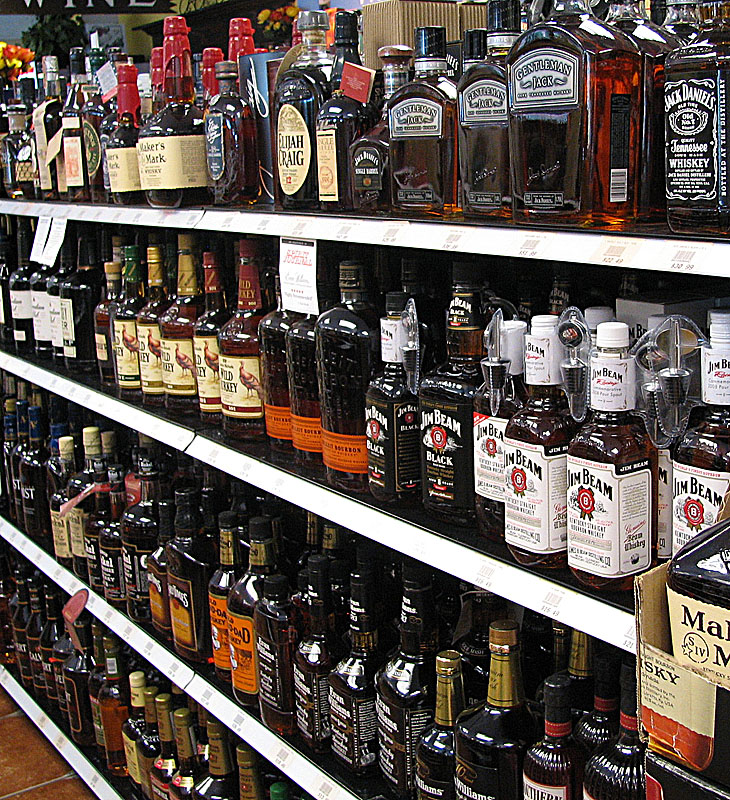
Various American whiskeys on store shelves

American whiskey is distilled from a fermented mash of cereal grain. It must have the taste, aroma, and other characteristics commonly attributed to whiskey.

Some types of whiskey listed in the United States federal regulations are:

- Bourbon whiskey: made from mash that consists of at least 51% corn (maize) and aged in new charred American white oak barrels.
- Corn whiskey: made from mash that consists of at least 80% corn and is not aged, or, if aged, is aged in uncharred or used barrels.
- Malt whiskey: made from mash that consists of at least 51% malted barley
- Rye whiskey: made from mash that consists of at least 51% rye
- Rye malt whiskey: made from mash that consists of at least 51% malted rye
- Wheat whiskey: made from mash that consists of at least 51% wheat

These types of American whiskey must be distilled to no more than 80% alcohol by volume, and barrelled at no more than 125 proof. Only water may be added to the final product; the addition of colouring or flavouring is prohibited. These whiskeys must be aged in new charred-oak containers, except for corn whiskey, which does not have to be aged. If it is aged, it must be in uncharred oak barrels or in used barrels. Corn whiskey is usually unaged and sold as a legal version of moonshine.

There is no minimum aging period required for a spirit to legally be called whiskey. If one of these whiskey types reaches two years aging or beyond, it is additionally designated as straight, e.g., straight rye whiskey. A whiskey that fulfils all above requirements but derives from less than 51% of any one specific grain can be called simply a straight whiskey without naming a grain.

US regulations recognize other whiskey categories, including:

- Blended whiskey: a mixture that contains a blend of straight whiskeys and neutral grain spirits (NGS), and may also contain flavourings and colourings. The percentage of NGS must be disclosed on the label and may be as much at 80% on a proof gallon basis.
- Light whiskey: produced in the US at more than 80% alcohol by volume and stored in used or uncharred new oak containers
- Spirit whiskey: a mixture of neutral spirits and at least 5% of certain stricter categories of whiskey

Another important labelling in the marketplace is Tennessee whiskey, which includes brands such as Jack Daniel's, George Dickel, Collier and McKeel, and Benjamin Prichard's. The main difference defining a Tennessee whiskey is that it must be filtered through sugar maple charcoal before aging, known as the Lincoln County Process. (Benjamin Prichard's, which is not so filtered, was grandfathered in when the requirement was introduced in 2017.) The rest of the distillation process of Tennessee Whiskey is identical to bourbon whiskey. Whiskey sold as "Tennessee whiskey" is defined as bourbon under NAFTA and at least one other international trade agreement, and is similarly required to meet the legal definition of bourbon under Canadian law.

=== Australian ===
Australian whiskies have won global whisky awards and medals, including the World Whiskies Awards and Jim Murray's Whisky Bible "Liquid Gold Awards".

=== Canadian ===
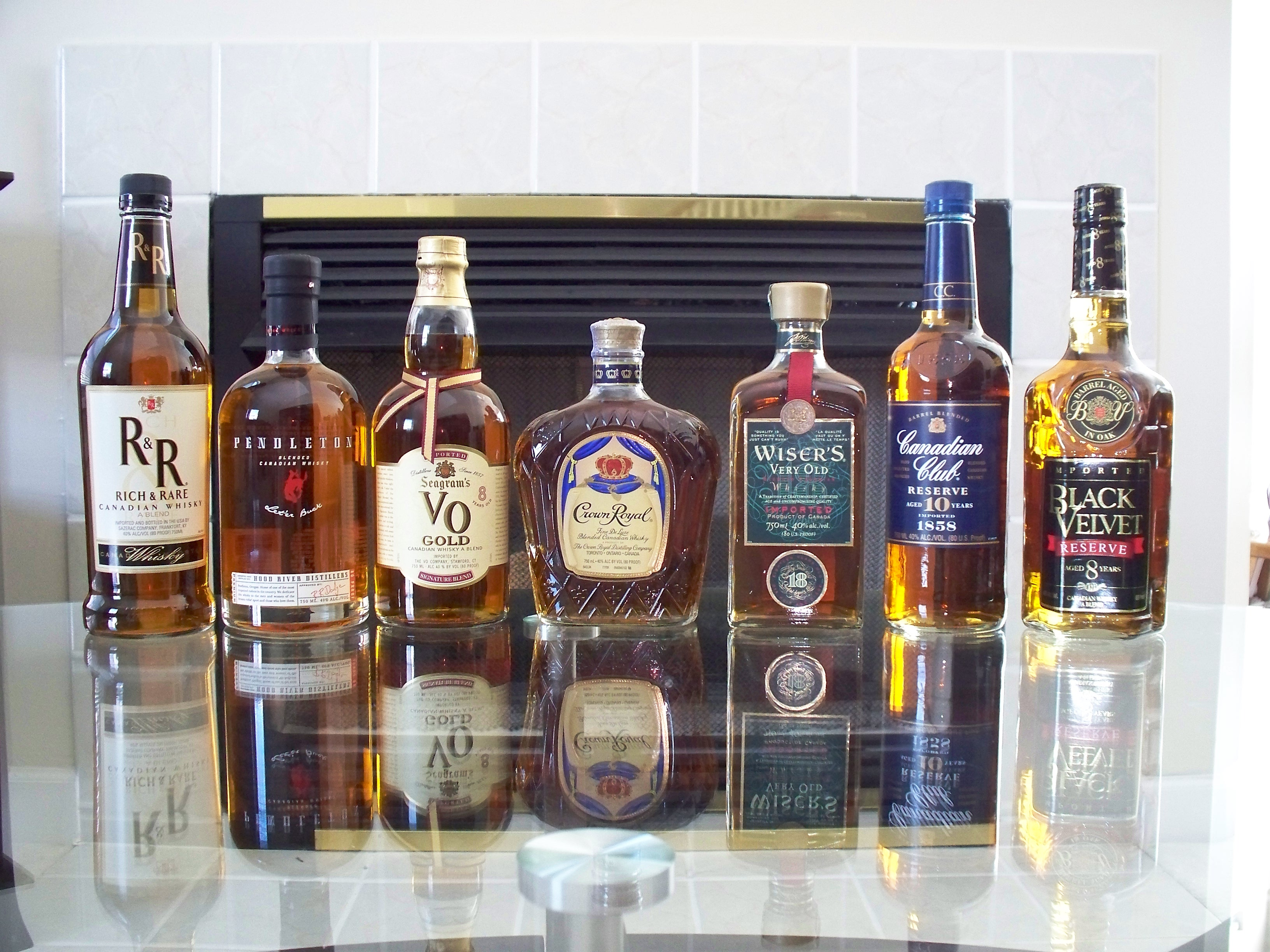
Various Canadian whiskies

By Canadian law, Canadian whiskies must be produced and aged in Canada, be distilled from a fermented mash of cereal grain, be aged in wood barrels with a capacity limit of 700 litres (154 imp gal) for not less than three years, and "possess the aroma, taste and character generally attributed to Canadian whisky". The terms "Canadian Whisky", "Rye Whisky", and "Canadian Rye Whisky" are legally indistinguishable in Canada and do not require any specific grain in their production and are often blends of two or more grains. Canadian whiskies may contain caramel and flavouring in addition to the distilled mash spirits, and there is no maximum limit on the alcohol level of the distillation. The minimum bottling proof is 40% ABV. To be exported under one of the "Canadian Whisky" designations, a whisky cannot contain more than 9.09% imported spirits.

Canadian whiskies are available throughout the world and are a culturally significant export. Well known brands include Crown Royal, Canadian Club, Seagram's, and Wiser's among others. The historic popularity of Canadian whisky in the United States is partly a result of rum runners illegally importing it into the country during the period of American Prohibition.

=== Danish ===
Denmark began producing whisky early in 1974. The first Danish single malt to go on sale was Lille Gadegård from Bornholm, in 2005. Lille Gadegård is a winery as well, and uses its own wine casks to mature whisky.

The second Danish distilled single malt whisky for sale was Edition No.1 from the Braunstein microbrewery and distillery. It was distilled in 2007, using water from the Greenlandic ice sheet, and entered the market in March 2010.

Another distillery is Stauning Whisky, based in Jutland.

Nyborg Destilleri, from the island Funen (Fyn) in the center of Denmark, produces organic whisky and other organic spirits. The distillery was established in 2009, and in 2020 they launched their first 10 year old whisky.

=== English ===
English whisky was produced in London, Liverpool, and Bristol until the late 19th century, after which the production of whisky ceased in England until 2003. There are currently 70 distilleries producing Malt and Grain English whisky and 20 brands of English whisky. English whisky producers adhere to the British Standards Institute (BSI) guidance BS8636 and the English whisky GI which was submitted by the English Whisky Guild and has now been approved. The definition of single malt in the English whisky GI has been met with some opposition.

=== Finnish ===
In 2005, there were two working distilleries in Finland and a third one under construction. Whisky retail sales in Finland are controlled solely by the state alcohol monopoly Alko and advertising of strong alcoholic beverages is banned.

=== French ===
The distilleries producing French whisky include Glann ar Mor and Warenghem in Brittany, Guillon in the Champagne region, and Grallet-Dupic in Lorraine. Buckwheat whisky is produced by Distillerie des Menhirs in Plomelin, Brittany. In 2023, there were around 130 whisky producers in France (52 in 2018, 5 in 2004). Distilleries producing French whisky include the Celtic Whisky Distillerie, La Distillerie des Menhirs, and Warenghem in Brittany; Meyer and J. Bertrand, Hepp, and Lehmann in Alsace; and Grallet-Dupic and Rozelieures in Lorraine. 800,000 bottles of French whisky were sold in 2016.

The first French whisky was produced at Warenghem distillery in 1987, who then introduced the first single malt French whisky in 1998.

According to a study in 2016, the French are the largest consumers of single malt whisky in the world, especially Scotch.

=== German ===
German whisky production is a relatively recent phenomenon having only started in the early 1990s. The styles produced resemble those made in Ireland, Scotland and the United States: single malts, blends, wheat, and bourbon-like styles. There is no standard spelling of German whiskies with distilleries using both "whisky" and "whiskey". In 2008 there were 23 distilleries in Germany producing whisky.

=== Indian ===
Distilled alcoholic beverages that are labelled as "whisky" in India were commonly blends based on neutral spirits that are distilled from fermented molasses/grain with only a small portion consisting of traditional malt whisky, usually about 10 to 12 per cent. Outside India, such a drink would more likely be labelled a rum. According to the Scotch Whisky Association's 2013 annual report, "there is no compulsory definition of whisky in India, and the Indian voluntary standard does not require whisky to be distilled from cereals or to be matured." Molasses-based blends made up 90 per cent of the spirits consumed as "whisky" in India, although whisky wholly distilled from malt and other grains is also produced. By 2004 shortages of wheat had been overcome and India was one of the largest producers. Amrut, the first single malt whisky produced in India, was launched in Glasgow, Scotland in 2004. After expanding in Europe it was launched in India in 2010.

By 2022 India produced many whiskies both for the local market—the most lucrative market for whisky in the world—and export. Indian single malts comprised 15% of the local market in 2017, increasing to 33% in 2022. In the three years to 2022 sales of Indian malts increased by an annual average of 42%, compared with 7% for imported rivals.

=== Irish ===
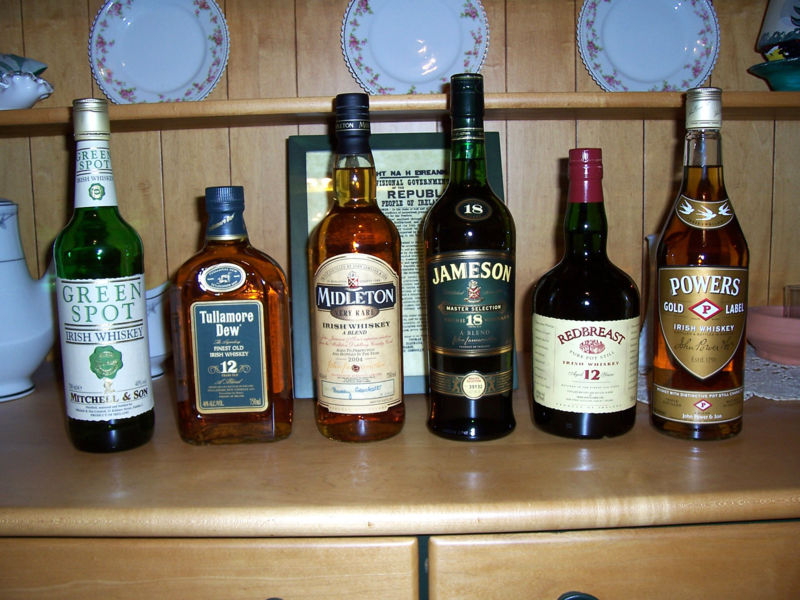
Various Irish whiskeys

Irish whiskeys are normally distilled three times, Cooley Distillery being the exception as they double distil. Though traditionally distilled using pot stills, the column still is now used to produce grain whiskey for blends. By law, Irish whiskey must be produced in Ireland and aged in wooden casks for a period of no less than three years, although in practice it is usually three or four times that period. Unpeated malt is almost always used, the main exception being Connemara Peated Malt whiskey. There are several types of whiskey common to Ireland: single malt, single grain, blended whiskey and single pot still whiskey.

Irish whiskey was once the most popular spirit in the world, though a long period of decline from the late 19th century to the late 20th century greatly damaged the industry, so much so that, although Ireland boasted over 30 distilleries in the 1890s, a century later this number had fallen to just three. However, it has seen a great resurgence in popularity since the late twentieth century, and has been the fastest growing spirit in the world every year since 1990. With exports growing by over 15% per annum in recent years, existing distilleries have been expanded and a number of new distilleries constructed. As of mid 2019, Ireland now has 25 operating distilleries, with 24 more either planned or under development. However, many of these have not been operating long enough to have products sufficiently aged for sale, and only one was operating prior to 1975.

=== Japanese ===
Japan produces both single malt and blended whiskies. The base is a mash of malted barley, dried in kilns fired with a little peat (although less than what is used for some peated Scotch whiskies), and is distilled using the pot still method. Production began in the 1920s. Before 2000, Japanese whisky was primarily for the domestic market and exports were limited. In recent years, though, Japanese whisky has grown in popularity on the global market. Japanese whiskies such as Suntory and Nikka won many prestigious international awards between 2007 and 2014. Japanese whisky has earned a reputation for quality.

Since 2021, the local industry represented by the Japanese Spirits and Liqueurs Makers Association has regulated the definition of Japanese Whisky. It binds its members to ensuring that Japanese whisky is Japanese and conforms to quality standards. This includes a minimum alcohol content of 40% ABV, inclusion of malted grain, use of water sourced in Japan, a minimum of 3 years aging and most critically, that the distillation and bottling must occur in Japan. The standard was introduced in 2021 and enforced in 2024.

=== Mexican ===
Mexican whisky is relatively young, as it has not been as popular as other distilled drinks in the country. However, many local distillers have recently begun working to produce homegrown whisky and raise its profile to match that of international brands.

=== Scotch ===
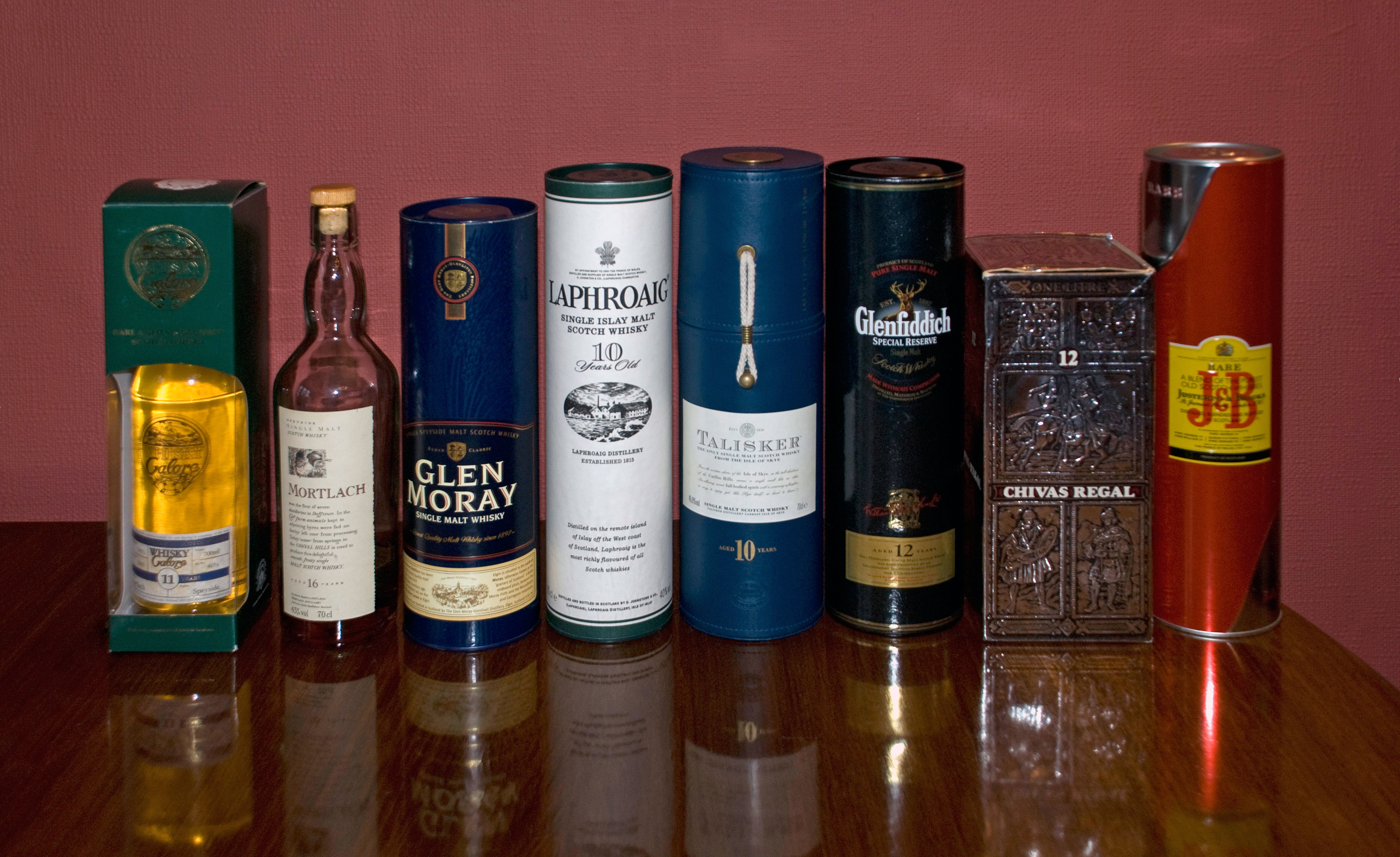
Various Scotch whiskies

Whisky made in Scotland is known as Scotch whisky, or simply as "Scotch" (especially in North America).

The regions of Scotch whisky

Scotch whiskies are generally distilled twice, although some are distilled a third time and others even up to twenty times. Scotch Whisky Regulations require anything bearing the label "Scotch" to be distilled and bottled in Scotland and matured for a minimum of three years in oak casks, among other, more specific criteria. Any age statement on the bottle, in the form of a number, must reflect the age of the youngest Scotch whisky used to produce that product. A whisky with an age statement is known as guaranteed age whisky. Scotch whisky without an age statement may, by law, be as young as three years old.

The basic types of Scotch are malt whisky, grain whisky, or a blend of the two made in Scotland. Scotch malt whiskies were divided into five main regions: Highland, Lowland, Islay, Speyside and Campbeltown. Each of the whisky producing regions has a distinct flavour profile and characteristics to the whisky they produce.

There is also a sixth region recognized by some sources, though not by the Scotch Whisky Association: the Islands, excluding Islay. This unofficial region, (part of the Highlands according to the Association), includes the following whisky-producing islands making Island single malt: Arran, Jura, Mull, Orkney, and Skye.

=== Swedish ===
Whisky started being produced in Sweden in 1955 by the now defunct Skeppets whisky brand. Their last bottle was sold in 1971. In 1999 Mackmyra Whisky was founded and is today the largest producer and has won several awards including European Whisky of the Year in Jim Murray's 2011 Whisky Bible and the International Wine & Spirits Competition (IWSC) 2012 Award for Best European Spirits Producer of 2012.

=== Taiwanese ===
Kavalan was the first private whisky distillery in Taiwan. In January 2010, one of the distillery's products caused a stir by beating three Scotch whiskies and one English whisky in a blind tasting organised in Leith, Scotland, to celebrate Burns Night. The distillery was named by Whisky Magazine as the World Icons of Whisky "Whisky Visitor Attraction of the Year" for 2011, and its products have won several other awards. In 2012, Kavalan's Solist Fino Sherry Cask malt whisky was named "new whisky of the year" by Jim Murray in his guide, Jim Murray's Whisky Bible. In 2015, Kavalan's Solist Vinho Barrique Single Cask was named the world's best single malt whisky by World Whiskies Awards. In 2016, Kavalan Solist Amontillado Sherry Single Cask was named the world's best single malt whisky by World Whisky Awards.

=== Welsh ===
Although distillation of whisky in Wales began in Middle Ages there were no commercially operated distilleries during the 20th century. The rise of the temperance movement saw the decline of the commercial production of liquor during the 19th century and in 1894 Welsh whisky production ceased. The revival of Welsh whisky began in the 1990s. Initially a "Prince of Wales" malt whisky was sold as Welsh whisky but was simply blended scotch bottled in Wales. A lawsuit by Scotch distillers ended this enterprise. In 2000, Penderyn Distillery started production of Penderyn single malt whisky. The first bottles went on sale on 1 March 2004, Saint David's Day, and it is now sold worldwide. Penderyn Distillery is located in the Brecon Beacons National Park and is considered to be the smallest distillery in the world.

=== Dutch ===
The Dutch have a historical distilling industry with Jenever for centuries, yet whisky is only a recent development since 2005. In 2005 Fryske Hynder Single Malt was introduced by the Us Heit Distillery, and Millstone was introduced by Zuidam Distillers. There are now over 70 Dutch whisky brands that make their mark on the (international) whisky market.

=== Other ===
ManX Spirit from the Isle of Man is distilled elsewhere and re-distilled in the country of its nominal "origin". The ManX distillery takes a previously matured Scotch malt whisky and re-distills it.

Whisky DYC is a Spanish whisky made by Destilerías y Crianza del Whisky S.A since 1958.

Puni is an Italian distillery in Glurns that makes single malt whisky, including Alba, which is matured in Marsala casks.

Ankara was a whiskey produced in Turkey from 1964 to 2011.

== Chemistry ==
=== Overview ===
Whiskies and other distilled beverages, such as cognac and rum, are complex beverages that contain a vast range of flavouring compounds, of which some 200 to 300 are easily detected by chemical analysis. The flavouring chemicals include "carbonyl compounds, alcohols, carboxylic acids and their esters, nitrogen- and sulfur-containing compounds, tannins, and other polyphenolic compounds, terpenes, and oxygen-containing, heterocyclic compounds" and esters of fatty acids. The nitrogen compounds include pyridines, picolines and pyrazines. The sulfur compounds include thiophenes and polysulfides which seem to contribute to whiskey's roasted character.

=== Flavours from treating the malt ===
The distinctive smoky flavour found in various types of whisky, especially Scotch, is due to the use of peat smoke to treat the malt.

=== Flavours from distillation ===
The flavouring of whisky is partially determined by the presence of congeners and fusel oils. Fusel oils are higher alcohols than ethanol, are mildly toxic, and have a strong, disagreeable smell and taste. An excess of fusel oils in whisky is considered a defect. A variety of methods are employed in the distillation process to remove unwanted fusel oils. Traditionally, American distillers focused on secondary filtration using charcoal, gravel, sand, or linen to remove undesired distillates.

Acetals are rapidly formed in distillates and a great many are found in distilled beverages, the most prominent being acetaldehyde diethyl acetal (1,1-diethoxyethane). Among whiskies the highest levels are associated with malt whisky. This acetal is a principal flavour compound in sherry, and contributes fruitiness to the aroma.

The diketone diacetyl (2,3-butanedione) has a buttery aroma and is present in almost all distilled beverages. Whiskies and cognacs typically contain more of this than vodkas, but significantly less than rums or brandies.

Polysulfides and thiophenes enter whiskey through the distillation process and contribute to its roasted flavour.

=== Flavours from oak ===
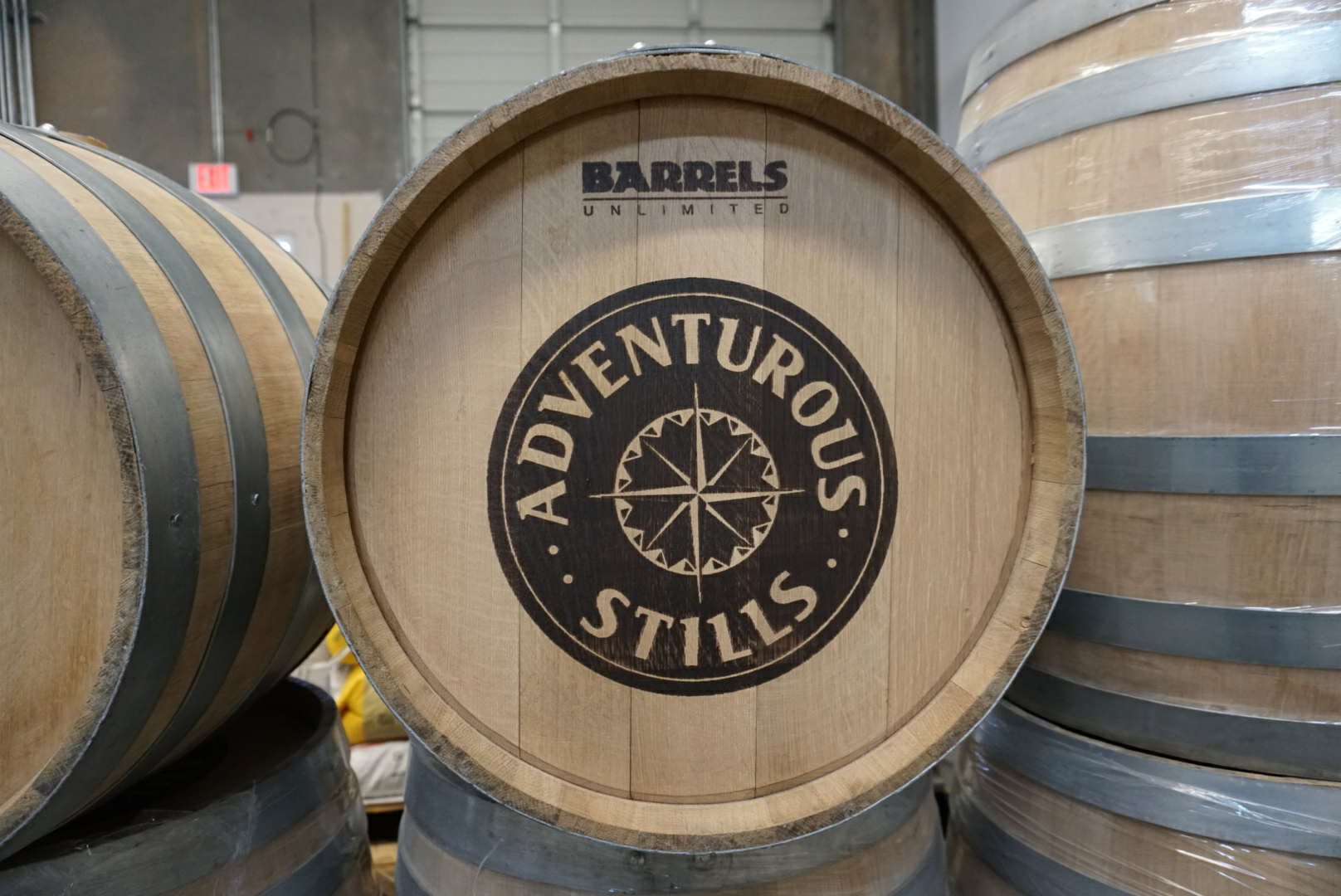
A charred oak barrel used to age whiskey

Whisky that has been aged in oak barrels absorbs substances from the wood. One of these is cis-3-methyl-4-octanolide, known as the "whisky lactone" or "quercus lactone", a compound with a strong coconut aroma.

Commercially charred oaks are rich in phenolic compounds. One study identified 40 different phenolic compounds. The coumarin scopoletin is present in whisky, with the highest level reported in Bourbon whiskey.

In an experiment, whiskey aged 3 years in orbit on the International Space Station tasted and measured significantly different from similar test subjects in gravity on Earth. Particularly, wood extractives were more present in the space samples.

=== Flavours and colouring from additives ===
Depending on the local regulations, additional flavourings and colouring compounds may be added to the whisky. Canadian whisky may contain caramel and flavouring in addition to the distilled mash spirits. Scotch whisky may contain added (E150A) caramel colouring, but no other additives. The addition of flavourings is not allowed in American "straight" whiskey, but is allowed in American blends.

=== Chill filtration ===
Whisky is often "chill filtered": chilled to precipitate out fatty acid esters and then filtered to remove them. Most whiskies are bottled this way, unless specified as unchillfiltered or non-chill filtered. This is done primarily for cosmetic reasons. Unchillfiltered whiskies often turn cloudy when stored at cool temperatures or when cool water is added to them, and this is perfectly normal.

== See also ==
- Outline of whisky
- List of cocktails#Whisky
- List of whisky brands
- Moonshine
- On the rocks
- Poitín
- Whisky with food
