= Whiskey thief =

A whiskey thief is a tool that master distillers use to extract small portions of whiskey from an aging barrel for sampling or quality control. The old-fashioned ones are made typically of copper and resemble a drinking straw in design. It has a coned narrow hole at the bottom and a vent hole at the top in which a distiller can cover with the thumb once the device is inserted in the barrel to trap and lift the whiskey out. By removing the thumb from the upper vent hole, the whiskey is released to drain into drinking glasses for tasting.

This same tool can be used for sampling other distilled spirits or wine from large vessels, hence it can also be used as a wine thief. Newer models may be made of clear plastic or glass with the larger models having the capability of accepting a hydrometer for testing purposes.

== See also ==
- Wine thief
- Aging barrel
- Winemaking
