= Rye malt whiskey =

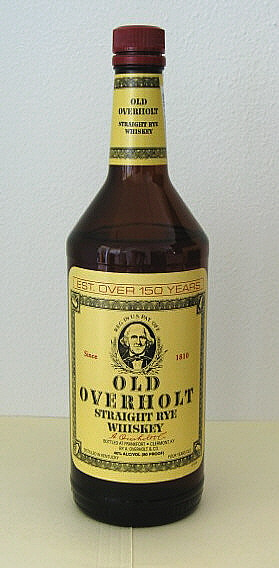
Old Overholt Rye Whiskey bottle

Rye malt whiskey, under US regulations, is a whiskey produced via a mash primarily consisting of malted rye. It is distinct from rye whiskey due to the malting step, and is distinct from unqualified malt whiskey, which is made from malted barley, not rye.

Examples of rye malt whiskey are primarily American, such as Old Pogue, North American Steamship Rye, or Old Potrero brands.

== See also ==
- Outline of whisky
- Starka
