= Hip flask defence =

Defence to a charge of drink driving

The hip flask defence, also known as the rising blood alcohol defence, is a defence to a charge of drink driving based upon the claim that the driver consumed alcohol between the time of a vehicular offence, such as a traffic collision, and the time of administration of a test for intoxication such as a breathalyser test. The defence asserts that the driver was not intoxicated at the time that they were driving, but had a higher blood alcohol level at the time of the test due to that subsequent consumption of alcohol.

The defence is not necessarily successful, because it may not be believed by a jury or other finder of fact, or may be disproved based upon the analysis of the amount of alcohol claimed to have been consumed after the driver stopped operating the vehicle.
