= Buckwheat whisky =

Type of distilled alcoholic beverage

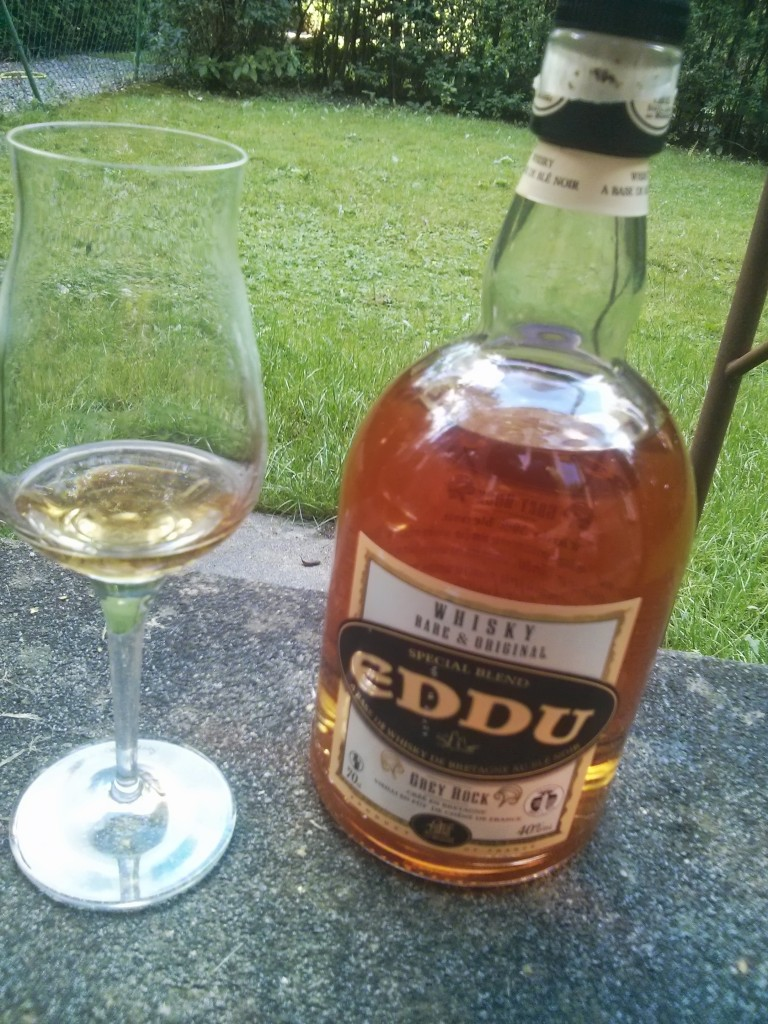
Eddu Grey Rock buckwheat whisky from Distillerie des Menhirs

Buckwheat whisky is a type of distilled alcoholic beverage made entirely or principally from buckwheat. It is produced in the Brittany region of France and in the United States. Soba shōchū is a similar but weaker beverage produced in Japan. Liquor made by distilling buckwheat honey is sometimes sold as buckwheat whisky or whiskey, though technically it is a distilled mead.

== Buckwheat ==
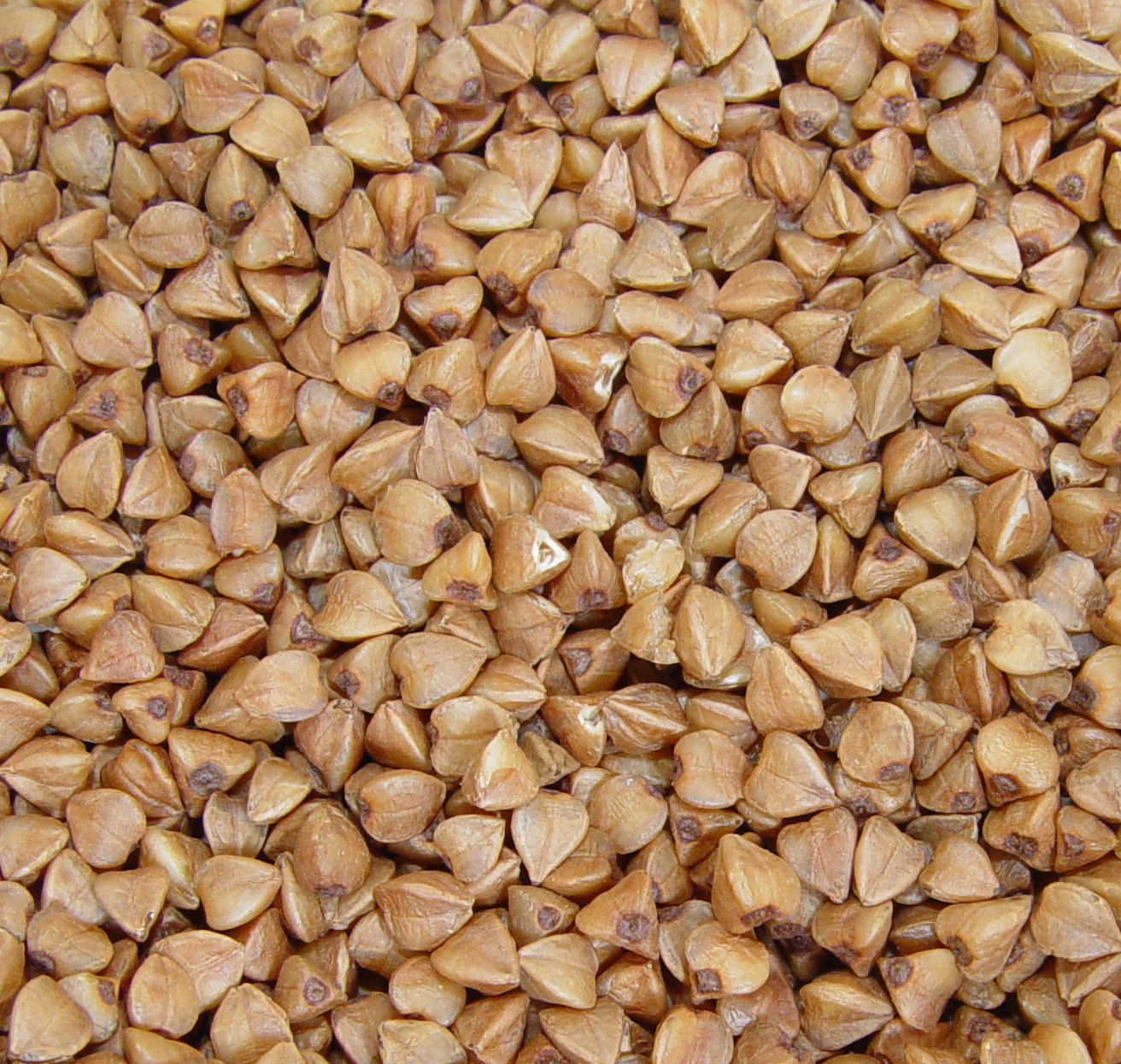
Buckwheat grains

Buckwheat (Fagopyrum esculentum) is a plant cultivated for its grain-like seeds. Despite the name, buckwheat is not related to wheat and is in fact related to sorrel and rhubarb. It is a type of pseudocereal, a non-grass used much like a true cereal. Over a million acres of buckwheat were harvested in the United States in 1918, but its cultivation declined sharply in the 20th century with the adoption of nitrogen fertilizer, which increased the productivity of other crop staples.

== Production process ==
The production of buckwheat whisky is comparable to the production of malt whisky, except that all or most of the barley is replaced with buckwheat. Buckwheat malt is produced by soaking the grains in water to allow them to germinate. Once the shoots appear, the buckwheat is dried, a process that causes enzymes in the buckwheat to convert the starch into fermentable sugars. The malt is ground in a mill and mixed with hot water to produce a sugary liquid. Yeast is added to cause fermentation of the sugars into alcohol, which is then distilled at least once to produce a colorless spirit. The spirit is then put into oak casks to mature.

== Commercial distilleries ==
=== Distillerie des Menhirs ===
Distillerie des Menhirs is a family-owned business in the village of Plomelin in Brittany, France. In 1998, the Le Lay family started producing the world's first pure buckwheat whisky, named Eddu Silver. "Eddu" means "buckwheat" in the local Breton language. Eddu Silver is produced through a double-distillation process in a pot heated by a direct flame and is aged in French oak casks. It is described as having floral scents of rose and heather, fruity touches of honey and marmalade, and spicy notes of nutmeg. Distillerie des Menhirs now produces a range of buckwheat whiskies, including Eddu Gold and Eddu Grey Rock.

=== Catskill Distilling Company ===
Catskill Distilling Company of Bethel, New York, is owned by distiller Monte Sachs, who uses water from the nearby Catskill Mountains to make its whisky. The company's buckwheat whisky is produced with 80% buckwheat.

=== Pinchgut Hollow Distillery ===
Heston Farm's Pinchgut Hollow Distillery is located in the town of Fairmont, West Virginia. The distillery has a heritage dating back to Prohibition and uses traditional recipes handed down for generations.

== See also ==
- List of buckwheat dishes
- Outline of whisky
