= Cacahuazintle =

Old heirloom variety of white dent maize

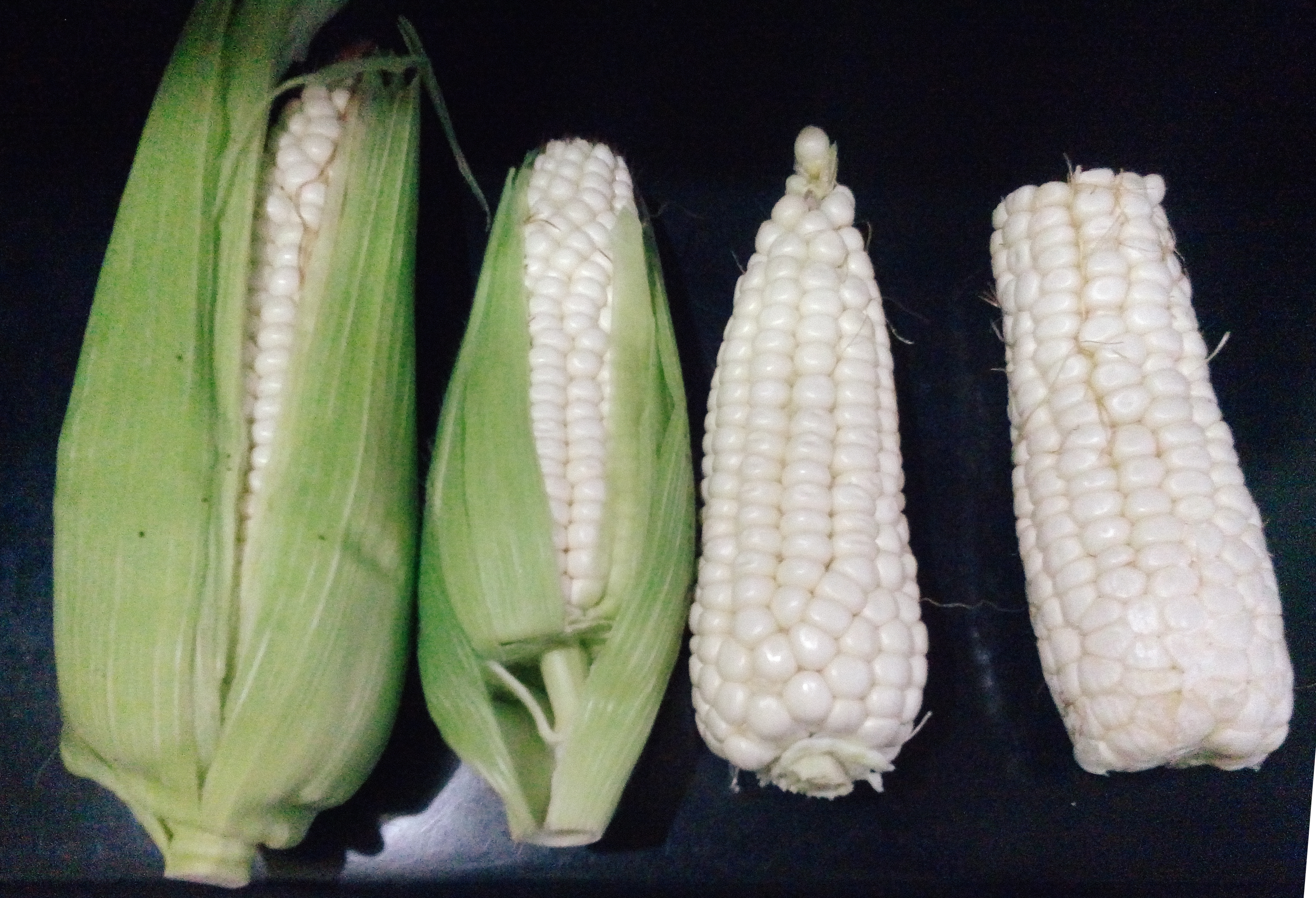
Cacahuazintle on the cob

"Cacahuazintle" or "cacahuacintle" (Spanish, /kakawa'sintle/; Náhuatl "cacahuacentli" 'pineapple-cocoa cob/cacao-like corn', from "cacahuatl" 'cacao' and "centli" or "cintli" 'corn on the cob') is the name of an old heirloom variety of white dent maize (corn) originating in Toluca, Mexico. It has a large ear with grains that are more white, round, and tender than the typical field corn grain. The dried grains are soaked and/or cooked in water with lime or wood ash, then rinsed thoroughly to remove the outer seed coat as well as any traces of the alkali salts (from the lime or ash)—this is an ancient process called nixtamalization. This creates a fresh, wet hominy, which can be dried for later use or ground into a flour called masa. Masa can be used to make tortillas, tamales, atole, pozole, etc.

When boiling the grains, they open and a loose foam appears. Historically, the primary use of cacahuazintle grain has been in the Mexican dish pozole. The Náhuatl name pozole, or pozolli, means sparkling, probably from the foam produced when cooking this type of corn.

Cacahuazintle can also be distilled into liquor. In Mexico, Abasolo Distillery and Winery (Destilería y bodega Abasolo) produces a whiskey distilled from cacahuazintle corn, also known as pozolero.

Cacahuazintle corn is said to have been in use for a very long time (and still is) as a prized variety for nixtamalization. It is difficult to find seed to grow it in the United States, but it can be found in just a few places on the internet. The grain is principally cultivated in the Mexican states of México and Morelos, and in 2020, production reached 23,706 tons. According to Mexico's Ministry of Agriculture and Rural Development, cacahuazintle is registered by the National Commission for the Knowledge and Use of Biodiversity (CONABIO) for "its sweet flavor, smooth texture, floury consistency and large grain."
