= Manx Spirit =

Clear spirit by Kella Distillers

Bottle of ManX Red

ManX Spirit is a clear spirit, 40% alcohol by volume which is distilled by Kella Distillers Ltd in a small distillery in Sulby, Isle of Man. It is produced by redistillation of existing Scottish whiskies, resulting in a clear and colourless product; as of 2012 is the only distilled spirit produced on the Isle of Man. As of 1997, the product sold 50,000 bottles per year, mostly on the Isle of Man and to the Far East.

In 1997, a United Kingdom High Court case, brought by United Distillers and Allied Domecq, concluded that despite being based on whisky and tasting "like a good whisky", the redistillation process and lack of colour meant that the drink could not legally be sold in the United Kingdom while labeled as "whisky".

ManX Spirit won 2 stars in the 2017 Great Taste Awards. It also won a silver medal in the 2019 International Wine and Spirits Competition.
