= Monkey Shoulder =

Scotch whisky

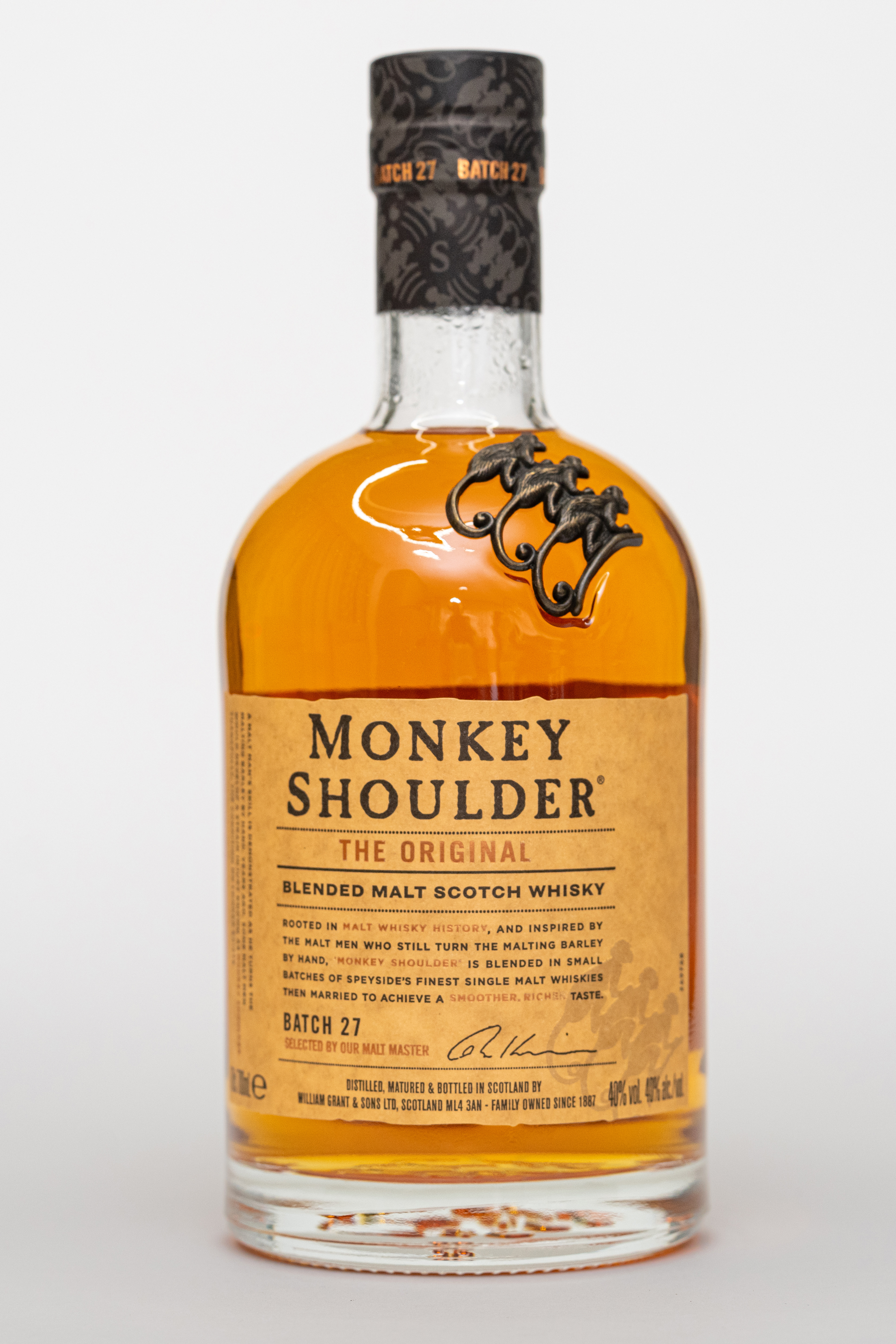
- Type: Scotch whisky
- Manufacturer: William Grant & Sons
- Origin: Scotland
- Introduced: 2003
- Alcohol by volume: 40%
- Website: Monkey Shoulder

Monkey Shoulder is a brand of Scotch whisky produced by William Grant & Sons in Scotland. Monkey Shoulder is a blended malt whisky, one of a small number of whiskies in this style. The unusual style was chosen to present an approachable Scotch appropriate for use in cocktails.

== History ==
Monkey Shoulder was introduced in 2003 as a brand of blended malt whisky (formerly called "vatted malt whisky") primarily for mixing, occupying a middle ground between blended Scotch (which can contain grain whisky) and single malt whisky (which cannot). Originally a blend from the Balvenie, Glenfiddich, and Kininvie distilleries, its current composition is not publicly known, although its constituent malt whiskies originate from the Speyside region.

The name refers to a repetitive strain injury that distillery workers once commonly were afflicted with after long shifts of turning malt by hand.

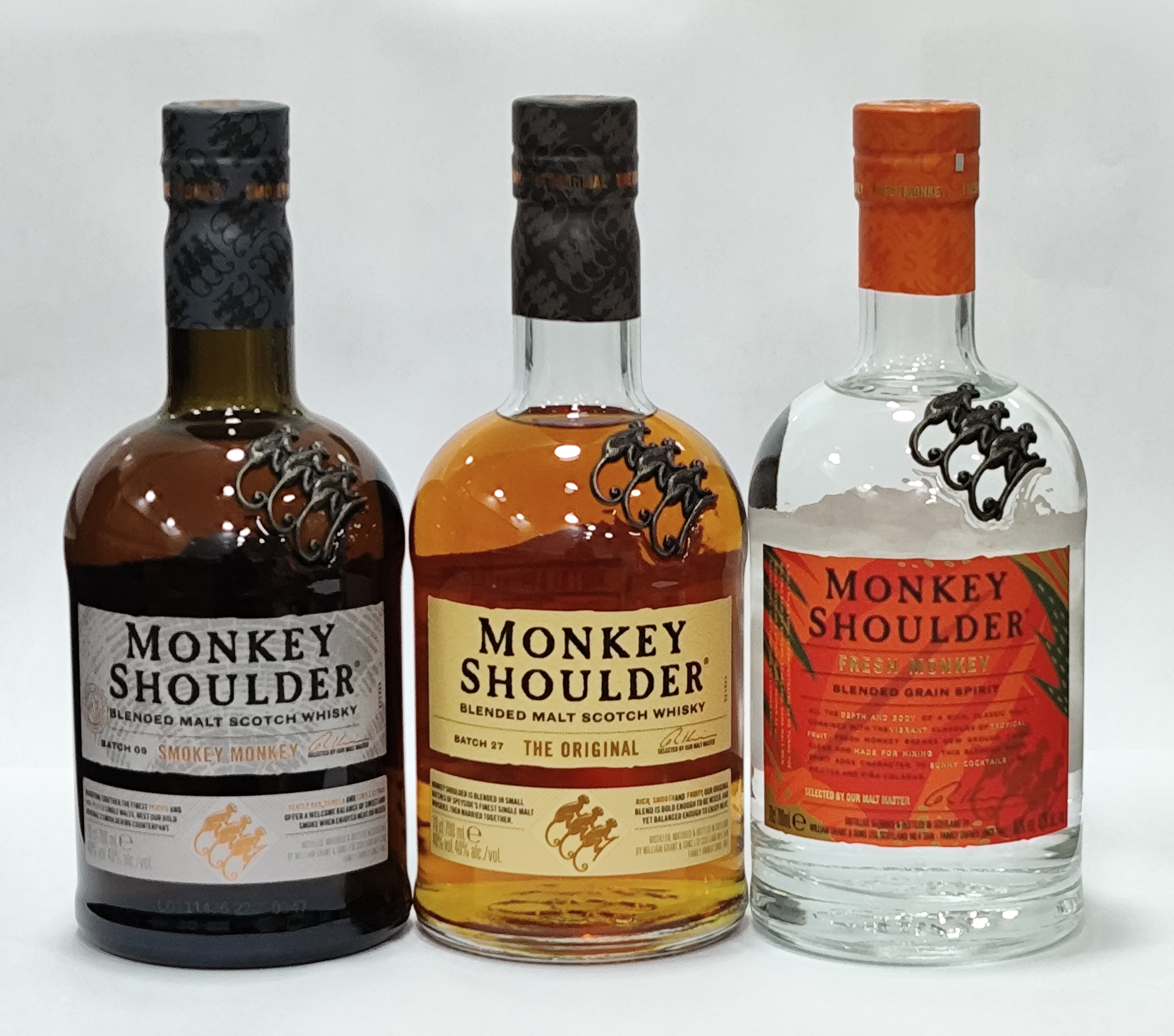
Range of products under the Monkey Shoulder brand

== Whisky Blends ==
- Monkey Shoulder Batch 27
- Smokey Monkey Batch 9, a blend that includes Islay whiskies

== Grain Spirit ==
- Fresh Monkey, blended grain spirit
