= Kininvie distillery =

Whisky distillery in Moray, Scotland

Coordinates: 57°27′58.4″N 3°07′48.1″W

Region: Speyside
- Location: Dufftown, Moray
- Owner: William Grant & Sons
- Founded: 1990
- Status: Open
- Water source: Conval Hills
- No. of stills: 3 wash stills 6 spirit stills

Monkey Shoulder
- Type: blended malt
- Cask type(s): Bourbon Casks
- ABV: 40%

Hazelwood
- Type: Single malt

Kininvie distillery is a Speyside single malt Scotch whisky distillery located in Dufftown, Moray, Scotland. The distillery is owned by William Grant & Sons and the product from the distillery is used in their blended malt and blended whisky brands.

== History ==
The Kininvie Distillery began production on 4 July 1990. The distillery was built on the grounds of the Balvenie distillery, and consisted only of a still house. Whilst featuring computer-controlled distillation, it lacks its own mash house. Mash houses are responsible for producing the liquid needed for fermentation in the washbacks, so the liquid used by the Kininvie Distillery in their washbacks was piped from the Balvenie distillery some 200 metres away. Kininvie does, however, have its own dedicated mash tun and washbacks on the Balvenie premises, as well as having its own barley specifications. The distillery operated 24 hours a day, 7 days a week to meet demand.

The output from the Kininvie Distillery is normally used in William Grant & Sons blended whiskies, primarily the Clan MacGregor blended whisky, a typical blended whisky featuring a high percentage of grain whisky mixed with the single malt from the Kininvie Distillery, among others.

Initially, the distillery's only single malt releases were limited editions called Hazelwood after the home of Janet Sheed Roberts. Hazelwood bottlings were specifically dedicated to her. Roberts was granddaughter of William Grant, a Director of William Grant & Sons and later the oldest woman in Scotland. In 2013, the company began bottling whisky under the Kininvie name. Its first was a 23-year single malt, distilled in 1990, the year the distillery went online. In late 2015, Grant announced that the Hazelwood name would be resurrected for the House of Hazelwood line of blended whiskies, wherein Kininvie would be prominently featured.

== See also ==
- Whisky
- Scotch whisky
- List of distilleries in Scotland
- William Grant & Sons
- Glenfiddich
- Balvenie
