= Grant's =

Scotch whisky

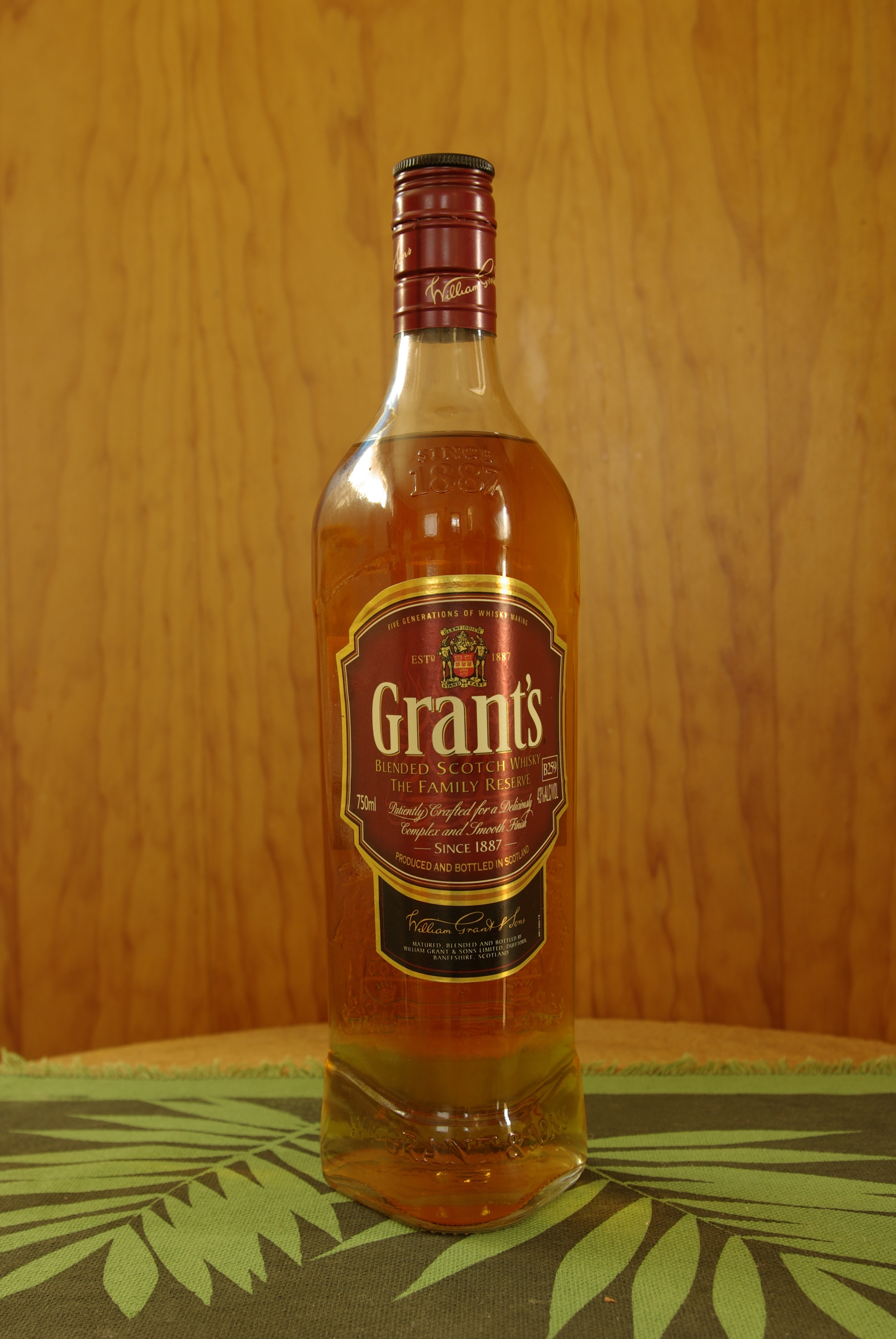
- Type: Scotch Whisky
- Manufacturer: William Grant & Sons
- Origin: Scotland
- Introduced: 1887
- Alcohol by volume: 40%
- Website: Grant's

Grant's is a blended Scotch whisky, produced by the company William Grant & Sons in Scotland.

== History ==
In 1886, William Grant started working in the distillery business as a bookkeeper. In 1898, Pattisons, the largest Scotch whisky blender at the time, went bankrupt, and William Grant stepped in and launched Grant's whisky. William built the Glenfiddich distillery in Dufftown, Scotland, with the help of his seven sons and two daughters. On Christmas Day 1887, it produced its first product.

Later, William's son-in-law Charles Gordon became the company's first salesman, and in 1909, he spent a year taking Grant's to Australia and the far east. In 1915, a new law stated that the minimum maturation period for Scotch whisky was to be two years (today it is three). While this led to the ruin of many Scotch whisky distilleries, William Grant had kept a supply of aging whisky in stock and was able to ensure continuous production.

William Grant died in 1923 but by this time, the family business was already established. In 1963, William's great-grandson Charles Gordon, oversaw construction of the Girvan grain distillery. In 1979, Grant's UK sales surpassed 1-million cases for the first time. Today, Grant's continues to be family-owned and operated. The current CEO, Glenn Gordon, is the fifth generation of the family to lead the business.

Grant's is the oldest family-owned blended whisky and is currently sold in over 180 countries. It is the world's fourth largest Scotch whisky brand, selling 4.1 million cases of whisky in the first half of 2020. The mother company, William Grant & Sons also owns single malt whisky brands, including Glenfiddich and The Balvenie.

== Range ==
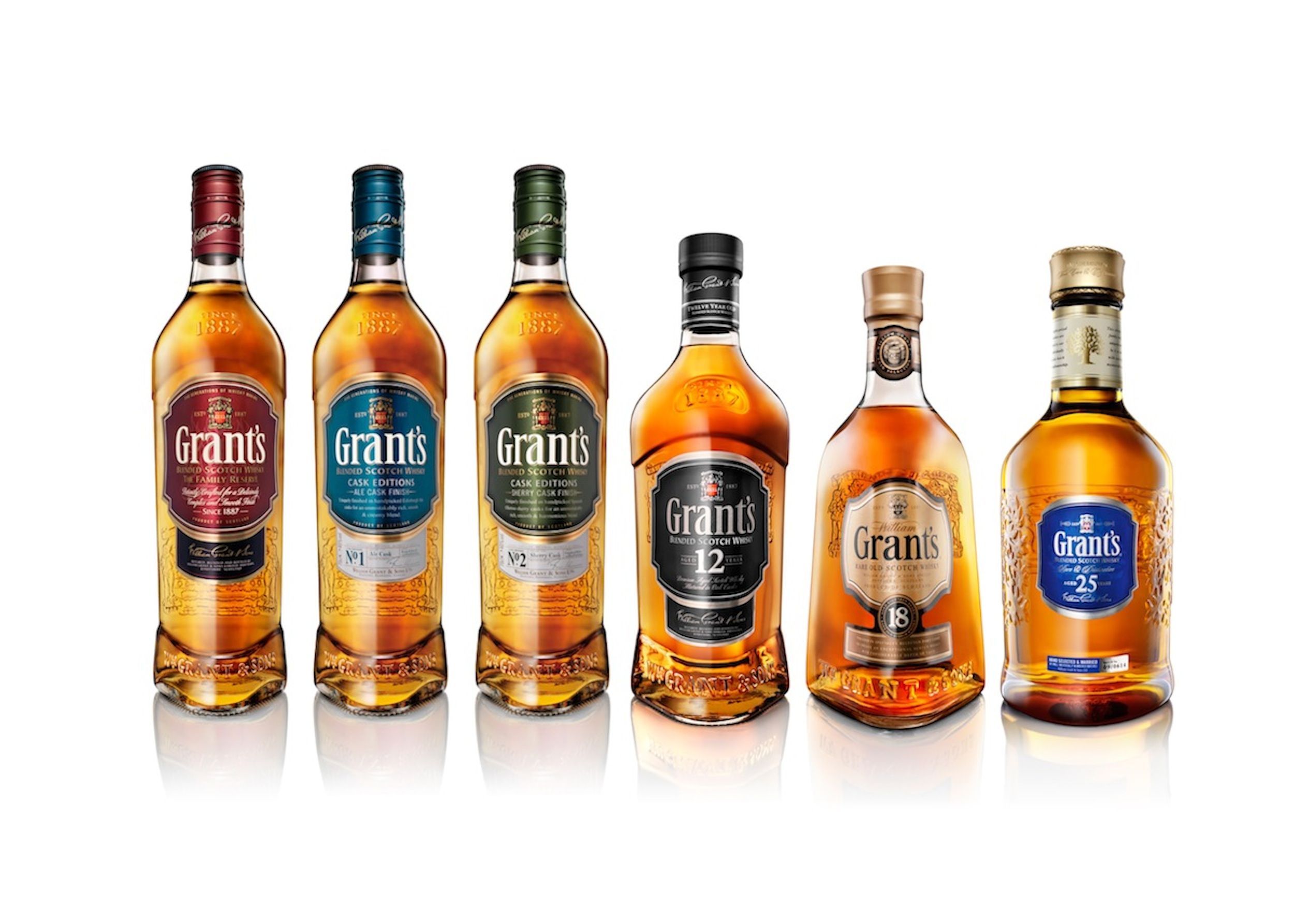
Grant's whisky range in 2011

In 2018, the range of Grant's whiskies was taken down to four: Triple Wood; Triple Wood Smoky; Rum Cask Finish; 8 Year Old Sherry Cask Finish. As of 2022, it was the world's third highest selling blended whisky.
