= Benedicta Chamberlain =

British billionaire heiress (born 1944)

- Born: February 1944 (age 82)
- Occupation: Heiress
- Known for: 29.29% shareholder in William Grant & Sons
- Spouse: Francis Fitzralph Chamberlain (deceased)

Benedicta Chamberlain (born February 1944) is a British billionaire heiress and a major shareholder in William Grant & Sons.

== Career ==
Benedicta Chamberlain is an heir to the independent, family-owned Scottish company William Grant & Sons, makers of Balvenie, Glenfiddich, Hendrick's, Tullamore Dew and Sailor Jerry.

According to Forbes, as of December 2014, Benedicta Chamberlain owned 29.29% of the shares in William Grant, giving her a net worth of $1.1 billion.

In 2008, Chamberlain established the Broomton Foundation, which she runs alongside other members of the Chamberlain side of the Grant family. According to Forbes, it has received about $4.5 million from the Chamberlain family, and its objective "may be one of the least clearly defined in history", namely, "its objects are to support such charities or such charitable purposes as the Trustees from time to time in their absolute discretion determine".

== Personal life ==
Chamberlain is widowed. Her husband was Francis Fitzralph Chamberlain, who was born in May 1934. She lives in Suffolk, England.
