= Ailsa Bay distillery =

Whiskey maker in Scotland

Coordinates: 55.2609°N 4.835°W

Region: Lowland
- Location: South Ayrshire
- Owner: William Grant & Sons
- Founded: 2009
- Water source: Penwapple reservoir
- No. of stills: 8 wash stills 8 spirit stills
- Capacity: 12,000,000 liters
- Website: Ailsa Bay distillery

Ailsa Bay distillery is a Lowland whisky distillery located in South Ayrshire, Scotland. The distillery is owned by William Grant & Sons.

== History ==
The Ailsa Bay Malt Whisky Distillery was built by the William Grant & Sons company to meet their needs for malt whisky for their blended whiskies. The distillery was built near the site of the Girvan distillery.

It was officially founded in 2007. The opening was attended by Prince Charles in 2009.

In March 2019, Ailsa Bay released a new brand of scotch whisky which was protected with blockchain technology to prevent counterfeiting.

In September 2019, Ailsa Bay released Aerstone, a new brand of single malt scotch whisky. William Grant & Sons says it is aimed at new whisky drinkers that find established single malts like Glenfiddich and The Balvenie “too complex with intimidating choice and language”.
