= Murray McDavid =

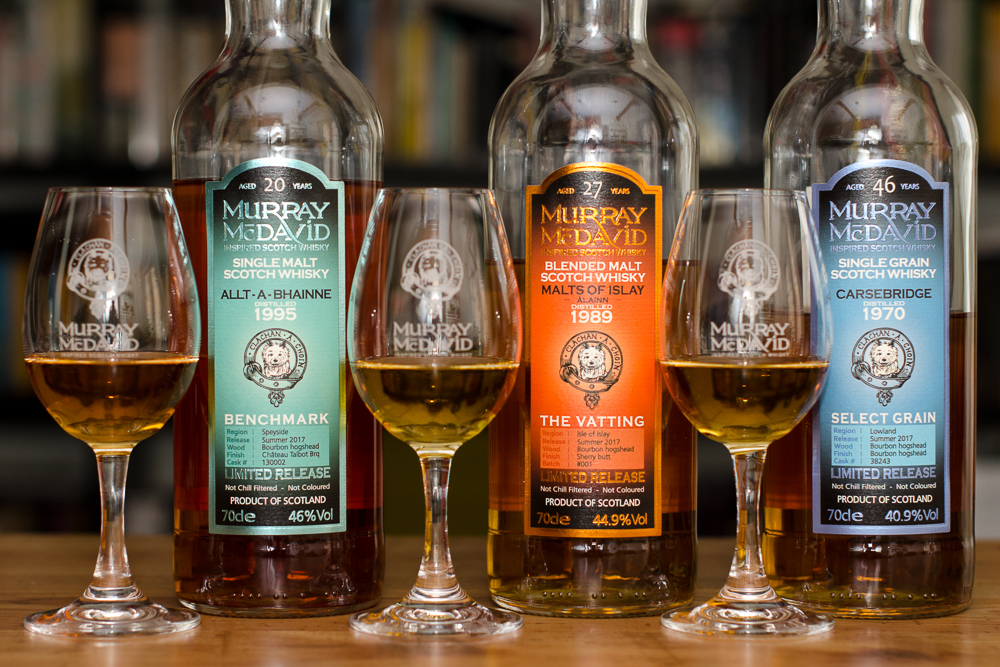
Three bottles from three Murray McDavid lines - Benchmark, The Vatting and Select Grain.

Murray McDavid is a bottler of Scotch whisky, offering a range of whisky from vintage single malts and grains to blended malts.

== History ==
Murray McDavid was established in 1996 by Mark Reynier, Simon Coughlin, and Gordon Wright (who had previously been a director at Springbank Distillery). On 19 December 2000, Murray McDavid purchased the then-dormant Bruichladdich distillery and returned it to production. An announcement was made on 23 July 2012 that Murray McDavid had been acquired by Rémy Cointreau UK Limited, a wholly owned subsidiary of the Rémy Cointreau Group, including Bruichladdich Distillery Company as part of the acquisition. Less than a year later, Rémy Cointreau announced that, while the Bruichladdich brand and distillery had been retained, the other business of Murray McDavid had been sold to UK-based Scotch whisky suppliers Aceo Limited, with the director of Aceo Ltd, Edward Odim, saying "Our intention is to continue the legacy of Murray McDavid by staying true to its founders' vision and principles such as bottling carefully selected single malts without chill-filtering or adding color and continuing and developing the tradition of ACE-ing our whiskies".

ACE (Additional Cask Enhancement, a term coined at Murray McDavid), often referred to as 'wood finishing' or just 'finishing', is a process of maturing whiskies for a relatively brief period of time, following proper maturation, in selected casks that previously held wines or spirits other than the original casks. For example, a whisky can undergo a several-year maturation in an ex-bourbon cask, after which it is transferred to an ex-wine (ex-sherry, ex-madeira, ex-rum, etc.) to enhance its flavour profile. Hence 'enhancement'. More recently, they have been using, among others, fresh, first-fill ex-bourbon casks to 'enhance' (or finish) their whiskies, notably from the Koval Distillery in Chicago.

== Murray McDavid products ==
Murray McDavid mature, select and bottle six main lines of whiskies. These include:

Mission Gold - the oldest single malt whiskies,

Benchmark - the core range of mature single malts,

Mystery Malt - single malt whiskies whose provenance is not explicitly stated,

Select Grain - a range of single grain whiskies,

The Vatting - blended malt whiskies (vatting of two or more single malt whiskies),

Crafted Blend - blended whiskies (vatting of single malt and single grain whiskies).

Murray McDavid is currently based at the disused Coleburn Distillery in the Scotch whisky-producing region of Speyside, where a lot of its casked whiskies mature under bond in a traditional, dunnage warehouse. Murray McDavid whiskies are released in strictly limited editions, often single-cask.
