= Convalmore distillery =

Whisky distillery in Moray, Scotland

Convalmore
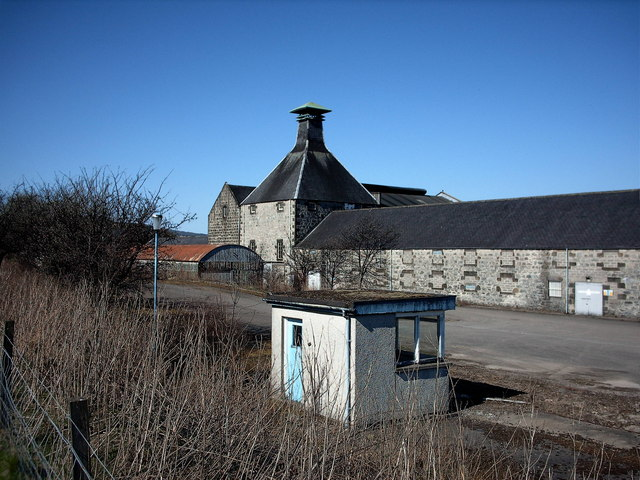
- Location: Dufftown, Moray, Scotland
- Owner: William Grant & Sons
- Founded: 1893; 133 years ago
- Status: Converted into a whisky warehouse facility
- Water source: Springs in the Conval Hills

Convalmore distillery is an inactive Speyside single malt Scotch whisky in Dufftown, Moray, Scotland.

The distillery was established in 1893/1894 and closed in 1985.

== History ==
The distillery was founded by Convalmore-Glenlivet Distillers Co. Ltd and in 1904 was sold to W&P Lowrie & Co. Ltd. In 1925, the distillery passed to Scottish Malt Distillers and The Distillers Company Ltd.

The site of the distillery is now owned by William Grant & Sons and is part of the greater Glenfiddich distillery and Balvenie distillery site. It was acquired by WG & Sons in 1992 to augment their warehouse capacity. The market rights to the name and bottling remain with Diageo.

The name of the distillery derives from the nearby Conval hills which are located just north of Dufftown.
