= David Stewart (master blender) =

David Stewart MBE (born 1945 in Ayr, Scotland) is the long-time master blender and malt master for William Grant & Sons distillers.

== Early life and education ==
Born in Ayr on the west coast of Scotland in 1945, David Stewart started work at William Grant & Sons as an apprentice in 1962, the year before Single Malt Scotch Whisky was first officially exported to England, when Glenfiddich became the first single malt to be enjoyed outside Scotland.

Following a 12-year apprenticeship at the independent family distillers learning the skills of nosing and blending the best quality Scotch whisky, David was appointed Malt Master of William Grant & Sons in 1974; a position he has held ever since, making him the longest-serving malt master of any distillers in the industry.

== Career ==
During his 50 years at William Grant & Sons, David has developed an award-winning range of single malts and blends which have earned him some of the industry's top accolades and helped the independent William Grant & Sons become Distiller of the Year an unprecedented five times by the International Spirits Challenge (ISC), four times by the International Wine and Spirit Competition (IWSC) and for the first time by the World Whiskies Awards in 2011.

His key achievements include the development of two cask maturation in the 1980s, unheard of at the time, but these days an established technique referred to as ‘finishing’ and widely enjoyed as The Balvenie DoubleWood 12 Year Old. David's introduction of Glenfiddich Solera Reserve 15 Year Old, was also the first and only single malt to use the innovative Solera maturation process.

As master blender at William Grant & Sons, he developed the world's first blends to be finished in Ale and Sherry Casks, with the introduction of Grant's Ale Cask Reserve and Sherry Cask Reserve. His passion for the art of blending also helped Grant's Family Reserve, the world's third best-selling Scotch whisky, receive consistent international acclaim as one of the world's best blends.

David officially handed over the role of Glenfiddich Malt Master and Grant's Master Blender to Brian Kinsman in 2009, after almost a decade working closely together. He firmly remains part of the William Grant & Sons family, however, dedicating his time to his Malt Master role at the company's renowned Balvenie Distillery in Dufftown. David's pioneering spirit and dedication to his craft, coupled with his modest, unassuming manner has made him one of the best-loved and respected craftsmen in the business.

== Personal life ==
Stewart lives outside Glasgow with his wife Ellen and has three children Heather, Colin and Alan and two grandchildren, Rory, three and Lily, one. An avid Ayr United football fan, David also finds the time to indulge in curling and a round of golf in his spare time. Apart from Scotch, Stewart enjoys Guinness and white wine, particularly from France or South Africa.
