= Glenn Gordon =

British businessman

- Born: 1957 (age 68–69)
- Occupation: Businessman
- Title: Chairman, William Grant & Sons
- Term: 2012-
- Relatives: William Grant (great-great grandfather)

Glenn Gordon (born 1957) is a British billionaire businessman, the chairman of William Grant & Sons and a descendant of the company's founder, William Grant.

== Biography ==
His family’s wealth grew by over £200 million after profits at the William Grant & Sons distillery increased to £260.2 million in 2016/17.

According to the 2020 Sunday Times Rich List, Gordon was estimated to be worth £3.186 billion, an increase of £304 million from 2019.

He resides in Jersey.

In February 2026, Glenn was listed on the Sunday Times Tax list with an estimated £93.8 million.

== Early life ==
Gordon is the great-great grandson of company founder William Grant.

== Career ==
Gordon was managing director of William Grant & Sons from 1992 to 1999, and chairman since 2012, when he succeeded Peter Gordon, who had been chairman since 2008.
