= Girvan distillery =

Scottish whisky and ginmaking facility

Coordinates: 55.2618°N 4.8335°W

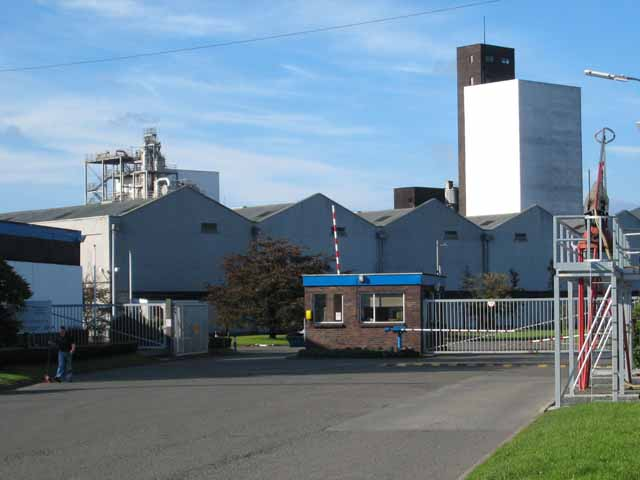
- Location: South Ayrshire
- Owner: William Grant & Sons
- Founded: 1963
- Water source: River Girvan
- No. of stills: 5 columns stills
- Capacity: 115 million litres per annum
- Website: Girvan distillery

Girvan distillery is a grain whisky distillery located in South Ayrshire, Scotland.

The distillery is owned by William Grant & Sons. The Girvan Distillery is one of the largest facilities in Scotland in which whisky is made. The distillery is named after the town of Girvan. The distillery is known as one of the most energy efficient distilleries in Scotland.

== History ==
Girvan distillery was built in 1963 with the installation of its first Coffey still in 1963, which was celebrated with their first official bottling. The reason for William Grant & Sons building the distillery was because of a quarrel between the Grant family and the Distillers Company Limited (DCL). Under the close eye of Charles Grant Gordon, the Girvan distillery was built and producing alcohol within nine months of ground break. Girvan contributes for Grant's and Clan MacGregor blended whisky. The company introduced its export single grain whisky, Black Barrel in 1985 to the Portugal, Spain and Italy markets.

Ladyburn distillery operated as a single malt distillery on site from 1965 until 1975 to make malts for the Grant's blended whisky. The malt portion of the distillery was closed in 1975 and demolished in 1976.

== Hendrick's Gin ==
The distillery also produces Hendrick's Gin. This uses not only the traditional juniper infusion, but also cucumber and Bulgarian rose. It won the 2003 Wall Street Journal award for the "Best All Around Gin".

== Girvan facts ==
- Blends contributed to: Grant's, Clan MacGregor
- Capacity (million litres per annum): 115 MLPA
- Cook time: 45 minutes
- Distillation system: multi-pressure
- Fermentation time: 60 hours
- Filling strength: 69%, 74%, 80%
- Grain type: wheat
- Malted barley percentage: 8.5%
- New-make strength: 94.5%
- Water source: River Girvan
- Columns: six columns
