= Gibson's Finest =

Canadian whisky brand

- Type: Canadian whisky
- Manufacturer: William Grant & Sons
- Country of origin: United States
- Region of origin: Pennsylvania, United States
- Introduced: 1856 (United States); 1945 (Canada)
- Proof (US): 80

Gibson's Finest is a brand of Canadian Whisky produced between 40% & 46% alcohol by volume (80 & 92 U.S. proof). The brand is owned by William Grant & Sons. Gibson's Finest was founded by John Gibson in 1837, and is currently produced in Windsor, Ontario.

== History ==
The Gibson's whisky brand was started by the Irish-born spirits merchant John Gibson at a distillery in Pennsylvania along the Monongahela River on 40 acres (16 ha) of land that he bought in 1856. He produced wheat, malt, and especially rye whiskey at the distillery. Prohibition in the United States closed the distillery, and shortly afterwards the entire Gibson plant and its contents were auctioned off.

As prohibition was ending, Schenley Industries purchased the Gibson's brand and in 1945, a Schenley subsidiary called Schenley Distillers Corporation established a distillery in Valleyfield, Quebec. In 1972–50 years after the auctioning of the Gibson's distillery—Schenley re-introduced the Gibson's name using whisky distilled at Valleyfield. The Gibson name re-surfaced on whisky bottles no longer containing Pennsylvania rye, but rather Canadian whisky.

Today, Gibson's Finest Canadian Whisky brands are owned by family distiller, William Grant & Sons and produced at the Hiram Walker distillery in Windsor, Ontario.

== Awards ==
Gibson's Finest Sterling, Rare 12 Year Old and Venerable 18 Year Old have won awards at major whisky competitions including Gold for the Rare 18 Year Old at the 2012 Canadian Whisky Awards and gold and silver respectively for the Rare 18 Year Old and the 12 Year Old at the 2006 San Francisco Spirits Competition.
