= Ladyburn distillery =

Distillery in South Ayrshire, Scotland

Coordinates: 55°15′36.5″N 4°49′52.5″W

Ladyburn Distillery
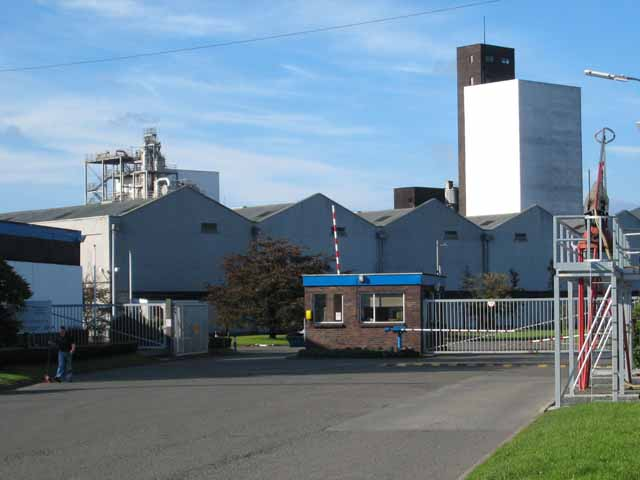
- Ladyburn distillery was located inside the Girvan distillery complex
- Location: South Ayrshire, Scotland
- Owner: William Grant & Sons Ltd.
- Founded: 1966
- Status: Closed/demolished
- Water source: Penwapple Reservoir
- No. of stills: 2 wash, 2 spirit
- Demolished: 1976

Ladyburn distillery was a Lowland single malt Scotch whisky distillery in South Ayrshire, Scotland.

== History ==
The Ladyburn distillery was an expansion of the Girvan distillery, itself built in 1963 by William Grant & Sons Ltd. The Ladyburn malt whisky distillery was created in 1966 with the addition of two pot stills. The malt portion of the distillery was closed in 1975 and demolished in 1976.

The independent bottlers Signatory Vintage and Wilson and Morgan have released Ladyburn single malt under the name "Ayrshire", after the council area of Scotland in which Girvan is found.

In December 2021, a bottle of Ladyburn from 1966 was sold in auction for over £80,000.
