= House of Hazelwood =

Brand of whisky

- Type: Scotch Whisky
- Manufacturer: William Grant & Sons
- Country of origin: Scotland
- Introduced: 2022
- Alcohol by volume: 40%

House of Hazelwood is a brand of aged Scotch whisky, owned and produced by the Gordon family, owners of William Grant & Sons. The whisky is made with spirit from the Gordon family's private collection.

== History ==
House of Hazelwood was launched in May 2022 and currently has two collections, one of which is dedicated to Charles Gordon who was responsible for the construction of Girvan Grain Distillery. The whiskies within the collection typically range from 35-60 years old and are priced between £950-£4,900 per bottle.

The brand's name is taken from that of the Gordon family's historic home, Hazelwood House, the dower house of Kininvie Castle.
