= Blackadder (whisky bottler) =

Blackadder is an independent bottler of single malt Scotch whisky. It was founded in 1995 by Robin Tucek and John Lamond, and named after historic Scottish figure Bishop John Blackadder. The company's bottlings are generally from single casks, are neither chill-filtered nor colored, and are bottled in clear glass to allow customers to see the natural color of the whisky.

Bottling series offered by Blackadder include the standard single-cask single malt whiskies, the "Limited Edition" range, the sherry-cask "Old Man of Hoy", the "Auld Edinburgh" range, and two alternate labelings used in place of the Blackadder name: "Aberdeen Distillers" and "The Clydesdale Original Scotch Whisky Co. Ltd."

Since 2000, Blackadder has also offered the "Raw Cask" series, which consists of whisky bottled directly from the cask, without even mechanical filtering. The lack of filtering leaves some detritus in the bottles including fragments of cask wood.

In 2014 Blackadder introduced a range of whiskies called Black Snake. These whiskies are produced using a Solera system, where aged single malts are placed into either an Oloroso or PX Sherry cask for further aging. When deemed ready, 2/3 of the cask is drawn to be bottled and the cask is replenished with more single malt for further maturation. Each draw for bottling is known as a "Venom".

Blackadder Whiskies are available in a number of countries, particularly Japan, Taiwan, Israel and Europe. In the US, Blackadder Whiskies are imported by Glass Revolution.
