= Charles Grant Gordon =

- Born: 21 August 1927; Glasgow, Scotland
- Died: 21 December 2013 (aged 86); New York City, US
- Education: Glasgow Academy; Rugby School; Glasgow University
- Occupation: Scottish whisky distiller
- Title: Chairman and president, William Grant & Sons
- Spouse(s): Louise Eccles (1954-2008 her death); Francesca Morales
- Children: 3
- Relatives: William Grant (great-grandfather)

Charles Grant Gordon (21 August 1927 – 21 December 2013) was a Scottish whisky distiller, chairman and president of his family firm, William Grant & Sons.

== Early life ==
Charles Grant Gordon was born in Glasgow on 21 August 1927, the eldest son of William Grant, and the great-grandson of the original William Grant. He was educated at Glasgow Academy and Rugby School, followed by a bachelor's degree in accounting at Glasgow University.

== Career ==
In 1951, Gordon qualified as a chartered accountant, and then joined the family business. Following his father's death in 1953, Gordon became a director, later joined by his younger brother Sandy and by Eric Lloyd Roberts, the husband of his aunt Janet Sheed Roberts (née Gordon).

== Personal life ==
In 1954, Gordon married Louise Eccles, and they had three sons, Grant Edward Gordon, Grant Glenn Gordon and Lloyd Grant Gordon. After Louise's death, he married Francesca Morales.

Gordon died in hospital of pneumonia in New York City on 21 December 2013.
