= Reyka =

Brand of Icelandic vodka

- Type: Vodka
- Manufacturer: William Grant & Sons
- Origin: Iceland
- Introduced: 2005
- Alcohol by volume: 40%
- Proof (US): 80
- Related products: List of vodkas

Reyka is a brand of vodka distilled and bottled in Iceland.

Looking to enter the premium vodka market, William Grant & Sons established a distillery in Borgarnes, Iceland to begin production in 2005. The marketing for Reyka draws heavily on Iceland's reputation for purity and uniqueness. The word "Reyka" derives from the Icelandic word for smoke.

The vodka is made in a carter-head still and uses water drawn from a lava field, forgoing the need of treatment or demineralisation before it is blended with the vodka.

== Awards ==
Reyka has won accolades including the 2011 Vodka Trophy, awarded by the International Wine and Spirit Competition and being ranked as one of the Top 10 Vodkas by Drink Spirits.
