= Three Barrels =

Brand of brandy by Raynal and Cie

- Industry: Alcoholic beverages
- Founded: 1947
- Headquarters: Cognac, France
- Products: Brandy
- Website: www.thehousebrandy.com

Three Barrels is a brand of brandy by Raynal & Cie that has been claimed to be the best selling brandy in the United Kingdom with annual sales of over 2.5 million bottles. However, it is not included in the 2015 list of the "World's 10 largest brandy & Cognac brands" published by The Spirits Business. While the company is based in the commune of Cognac, the beverage does not meet the Appellation d'origine contrôlée (AOC) criteria to be allowed to be described as cognac.

== History ==
The brand was founded in 1947 by the Pinet Casillion company in Cognac. Raynal was founded in Jarnac in 1840 and used the brand 'Pellisson'. The brandy was marketed in the United Kingdom as "Three Barrels Brandy" from 1947 and elsewhere as Raynal. Pellisson acquired Raynal in 1975 and Raynal & Cie was bought by William Grant & Sons in 2005. In 2008 a premium XO brandy aged in oak for 15 years was introduced. and 'Three Barrels Honey' was launched in the United Kingdom in July 2014.

=== Marketing ===
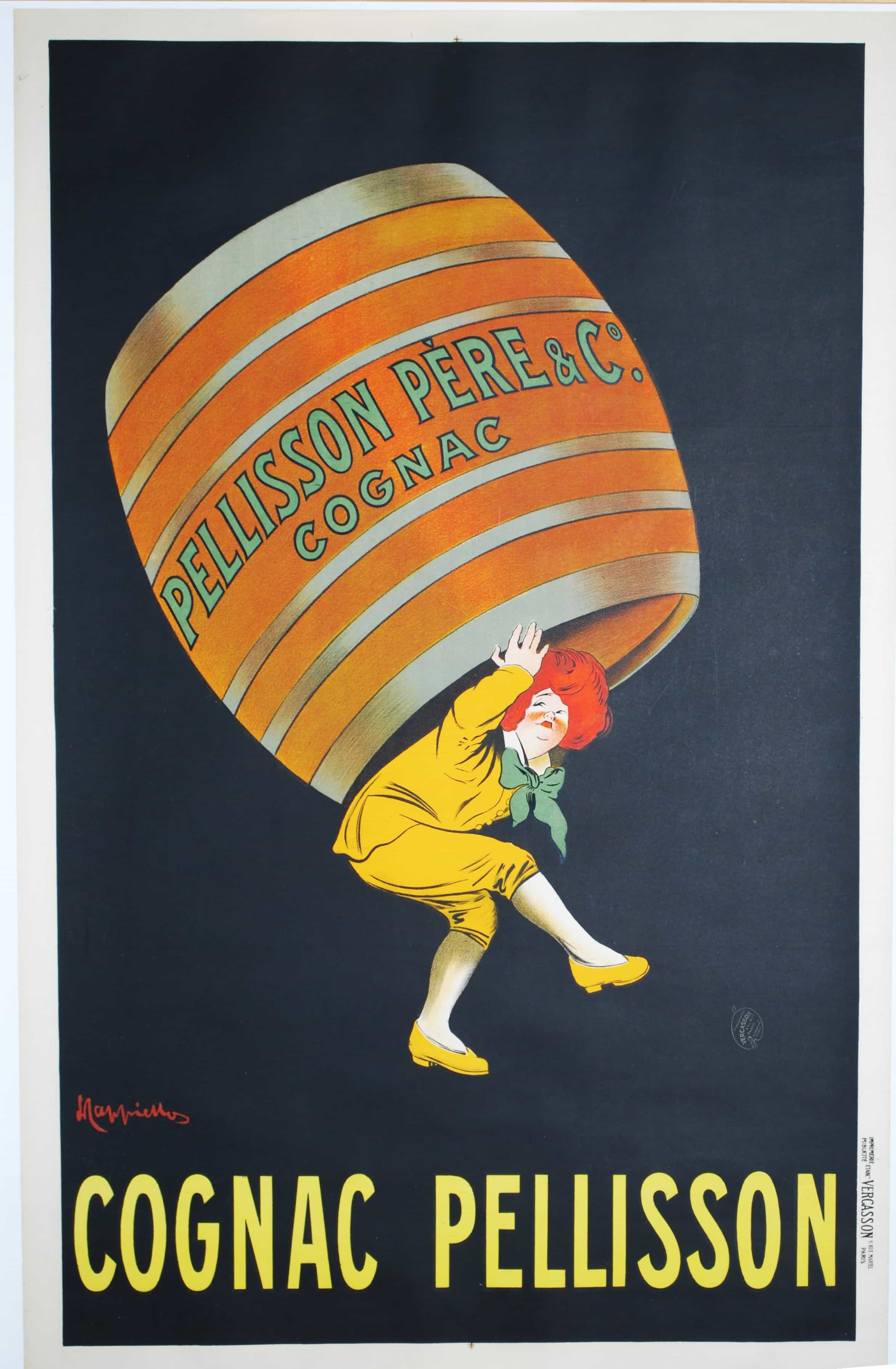
Cognac Pellisson poster by Leonetto Cappiello.

Since the brand has founded it has been marketed with a logo depicting 3 stacked barrels, which was reputedly the number that could be stacked on a sledge pulled by huskies in Canada. In 1907 the notable designer Leonetto Cappiello designed a famous poster for 'Cognac Pellisson' depicting a woman carrying a barrel on her back. In 2013 a rebranding exercise was carried out by Robson Dowry.

== Bottlings ==
- Three Barrels XO
- Three Barrels VSOP
- Three Barrels Honey
