= Hendrick's Gin =

Scottish gin brand

- Type: Gin
- Manufacturer: William Grant & Sons
- Origin: Scotland
- Introduced: 1999
- Alcohol by volume: 44% – 41.4% (varies by market)
- Proof (US): 88.0 – 82.6
- Colour: Colourless
- Flavour: Juniper, cucumber, rose
- Website: hendricksgin.com

Hendrick's Gin is a brand of gin launched in 1999 by William Grant & Sons at the Girvan distillery in South Ayrshire, Scotland. The gin was conceived by Lesley Gracie, a Yorkshire native, who worked in new liquid development for William Grant & Sons, who was asked to develop a new gin to be super-premium. In addition to the traditional juniper infusion, Hendrick's uses Bulgarian rose and cucumber. Hendrick's gin is bottled in a dark brown, apothecary-style bottle.

== Spirits ==
Bottle	Name	Introduced	Description	Flavours	Notes
	Hendrick's	1999	The original Hendrick's Gin, infused with rose and cucumber.	juniper, caraway, coriander, elderflower, chamomile, orange, lemonpeel, yarrow, angelica, cubeb pepper and orris root	Available sizes: 5cL, 375mL, 750mL, 1L, 1.75L
	Orbium	2017	Re-Imagining of Hendrick's	blue lotus, cinchona and wormwood	Hendrick's first new product after the 1999 original. Sold in dark blue glass bottle.
	Midsummer Solstice	2019	Infused with several natural floral essences	Floral Botanicals	First Hendrick's gin to be labeled "From our Cabinet of Curiosities". Sold in deep purple glass bottle.
	Amazonia	2020	Infused with tropical flavours	pineapple, orange, lime, guava and dragon fruit	Sold only in duty-free shops. Only available in 1L bottle.
	Lunar	2021		Warm baked spices and citrus.	
	Neptunia	2022		Rose, cucumber, 11 botanicals + kelp, thyme, and lime	
	Flora Adora	2023		Rose, cucumber, hibiscus, lavender, hint of raspberry	
	Grand Cabaret	2024		Stone fruit and sweet herbs	
	Sunspell	2024		Citrus, spice, and botanicals.	Sold only in duty-free shops, in 1L bottle.
	Oasium	2025		Herbs and fruits	
	Another Hendrick's	2026		Orange blossom and cacao	

== Other products ==
Hendricks has produced absinthe, and various gin-related products such as gin kits, glasses, tea pots, pourers, and novelty items.

== Distillation ==
Hendrick's uses a blend of spirits produced from a Carter-Head Still (constructed in 1948), of which there are only a few in the world, and a small pot still, built in 1860 by Bennett, Sons & Shears. Both have been restored to working order after being bought at auction in the 1960s by the former William Grant Life President, Charles Gordon. The two stills produce strikingly different styles of gin due to their different construction and methods of distillation.

The pot still is generally referred to as the Bennett still. The still is quite small, which allows most of the botanical flavour characteristics to pass into the spirit. The still is filled with neutral spirit, and the botanical recipe added with some water. This is left to steep for 24 hours, which begins the process of extracting the flavour from the botanicals. The still is then heated by an external steam jacket to boil the liquid. As the pot begins to boil, vapours move up the short column of the still to the condenser, where they condense and are collected. First runnings can be as high as 92% alcohol, with a gradual decrease in the strength as the distillation progresses. Once all of the alcohol is collected, the final spirit will be approximately 75% alcohol v/v. This spirit is heavy, oily, and smells strongly of juniper.

In contrast, the spirit derived from the Carter-Head still is much more subtle with light floral and sweet fragrances. Its method of production is quite different, with only the neutral spirit and water added to the pot. All botanicals used with the Carter-Head are added to a flavour basket at the very top of the still. Rather than boiling the botanicals, which produces the strong pungent spirit of the Bennett still, the Carter-Head bathes the botanicals in the alcohol vapours only. As these rise up through the still, they enter the base of the botanicals basket. Inside, the botanicals are contained in copper baskets, which hold them together while allowing the vapours to be fully exposed. As the evaporated alcohol moves through the botanicals, it efficiently extracts their flavours, which are carried out of the basket along with the alcohol until they reach the condenser. Only the lighter, sweeter and floral flavours can be extracted by this method, which gives the spirit its distinctive character.

The final Hendrick's gin is a blend of these two spirits, with an addition of cucumber essence and rose petal essence.

== Serving ==
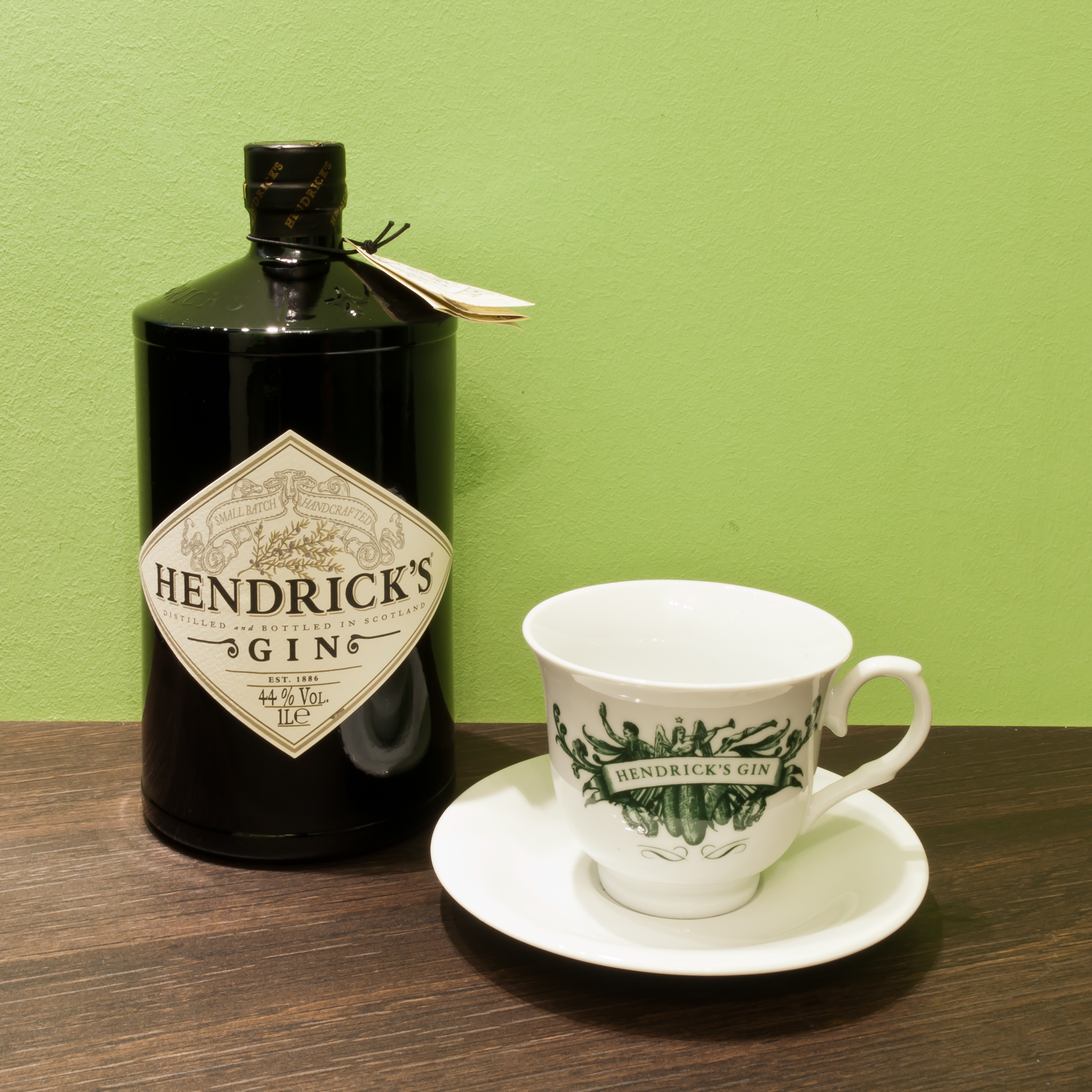
A bottle of Hendrick's Gin with a Hendrick's Gin tea cup

Hendrick's suggests that the gin be served with tonic water over ice garnished with cucumber instead of the traditional citrus. Hendrick's Gin's Master Distiller, Lesley Gracie, suggests mixing the gin with soda water and elderflower cordial.

== Awards and reviews ==
The Wall Street Journal described Hendrick's as the "Best Gin in the World" in 2003. The San Francisco World Spirits Competition awarded two double gold, two gold, and three silver medals between 2005 and 2012. The Beverage Testing Institute gave the gin scores of 93, 94 and 95 between 2007 and 2011.
