= Single malt Scotch =

Type of whisky made in Scotland

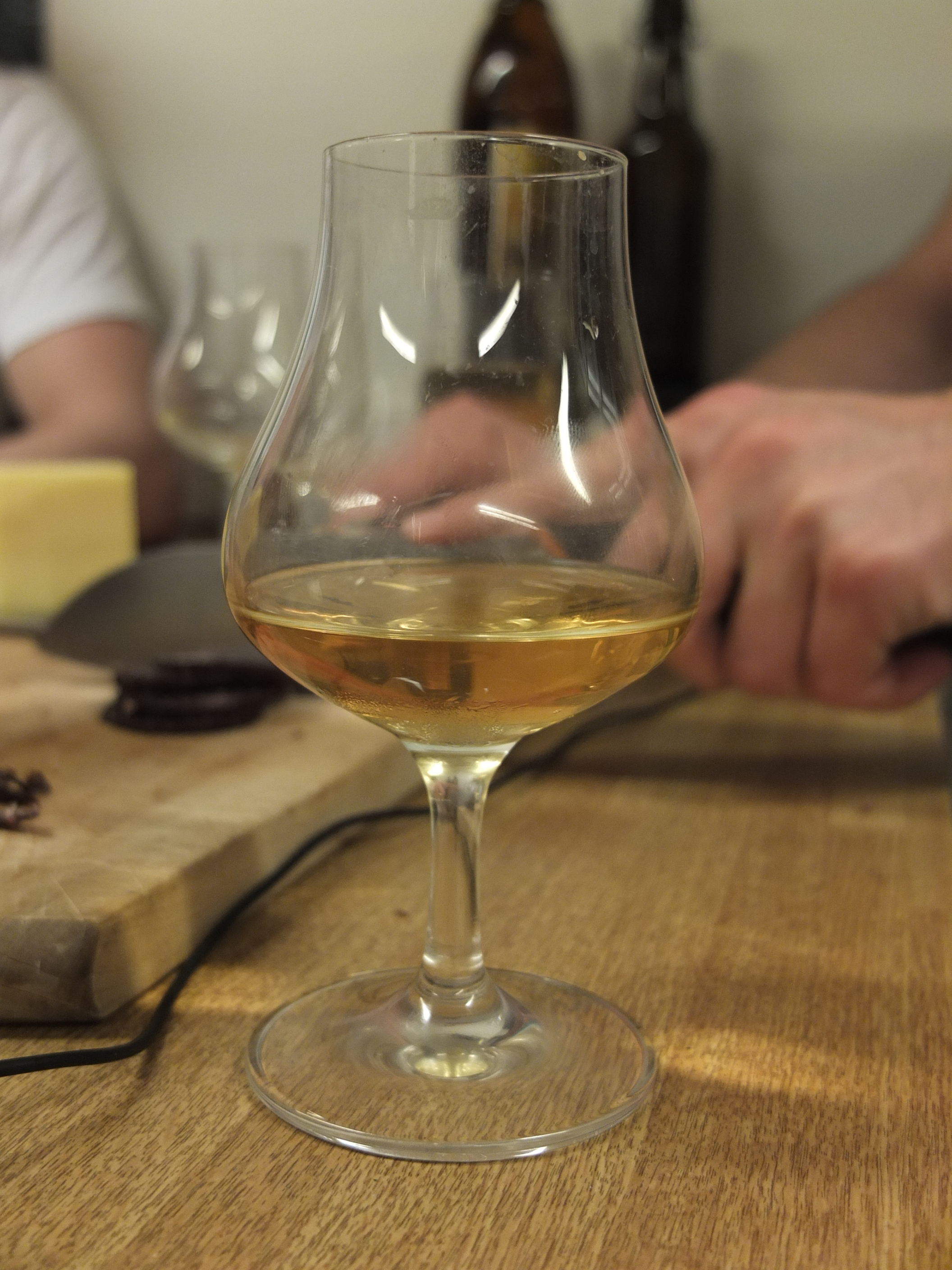
A glass of Bowmore 12-year-old single malt Scotch whisky

Single malt Scotch refers to single malt whisky made in Scotland. To qualify for this category, a whisky must have been distilled at a single distillery using a pot still distillation process and made from a mash of malted barley. Therefore, a single malt means that the whisky has not been blended elsewhere with whisky from other distilleries. As with any Scotch whisky, a single malt Scotch must be distilled in Scotland and matured in oak casks in Scotland for at least three years, although most single malts are matured longer.

== Definitions ==
- "Malt" indicates that the whisky is distilled from "malted" barley. Malting calls for soaking the grains in water for several days until it germinates. Heat is then applied to stop the germination, often using peat as the fuel. Other grains, such as rye or wheat, can be malted for other types of whisky, but barley must be used for single malt Scotch. The dry malt is ground into flour (grist) and mixed with hot water; this mashing process converts the starch into sugar. Later, yeast is added to increase the process of fermentation. Finally, impurities such as methanol are removed during distillation; this also increases the alcohol content.
- "Single" indicates that all the spirits in the bottle come from a single distillery. That distillery may combine single malt whiskies of several ages in a bottle.

Another term is sometimes seen, "double malt Scotch" or "triple malt". This designation indicates that the whisky was aged in two or three types of casks, but was not blended; hence, it still falls into the single malt category. The more common term for this type of whisky is "double wood" or "triple wood". Examples include The Balvenie 12 Years Old DoubleWood and Laphroaig Triple Wood.

Many companies use malt whisky purchased from multiple distilleries, and these whiskies combined into "blended malt".

Until the Scotch Whisky Regulations 2009 (SWR 2009), the word "blended" only appeared (in the context of Scotch whisky) on bottles of whisky that contained a mixture of both barley and non-barley grain whisky, but this is no longer the case. Under the terminology established by the SWR 2009, the term "blended malt Scotch whisky" replaced the term "vatted malt" to describe a mixture of single malt Scotch whiskies (malted barley whisky).

Only about 10% of the Scotch whiskies on the market are defined as single malt. The other 90% is made by combining numerous whiskies, typically two-thirds grain whisky (non-barley) and one-third malt whisky, from several, or numerous, distilleries in Scotland. The resulting products are labeled "blended Scotch whisky", without the word "malt". Nearly 90% of Scotch whisky sold each year is a blended type. Nonetheless, in 2018, single malt Scotch made up nearly 28% by value of the £4.7 billion of whisky exported from Scotland.

For any Scotch whisky, whether malt or blended, the age statement on a bottle refers to the number of years the whisky spent maturing in casks. Very few whiskies are bottled from a single cask. The mixing of spirits with different amounts of ageing is allowed; the age statement of the resulting mix reflects the age of the youngest whisky in the bottle.

== History ==
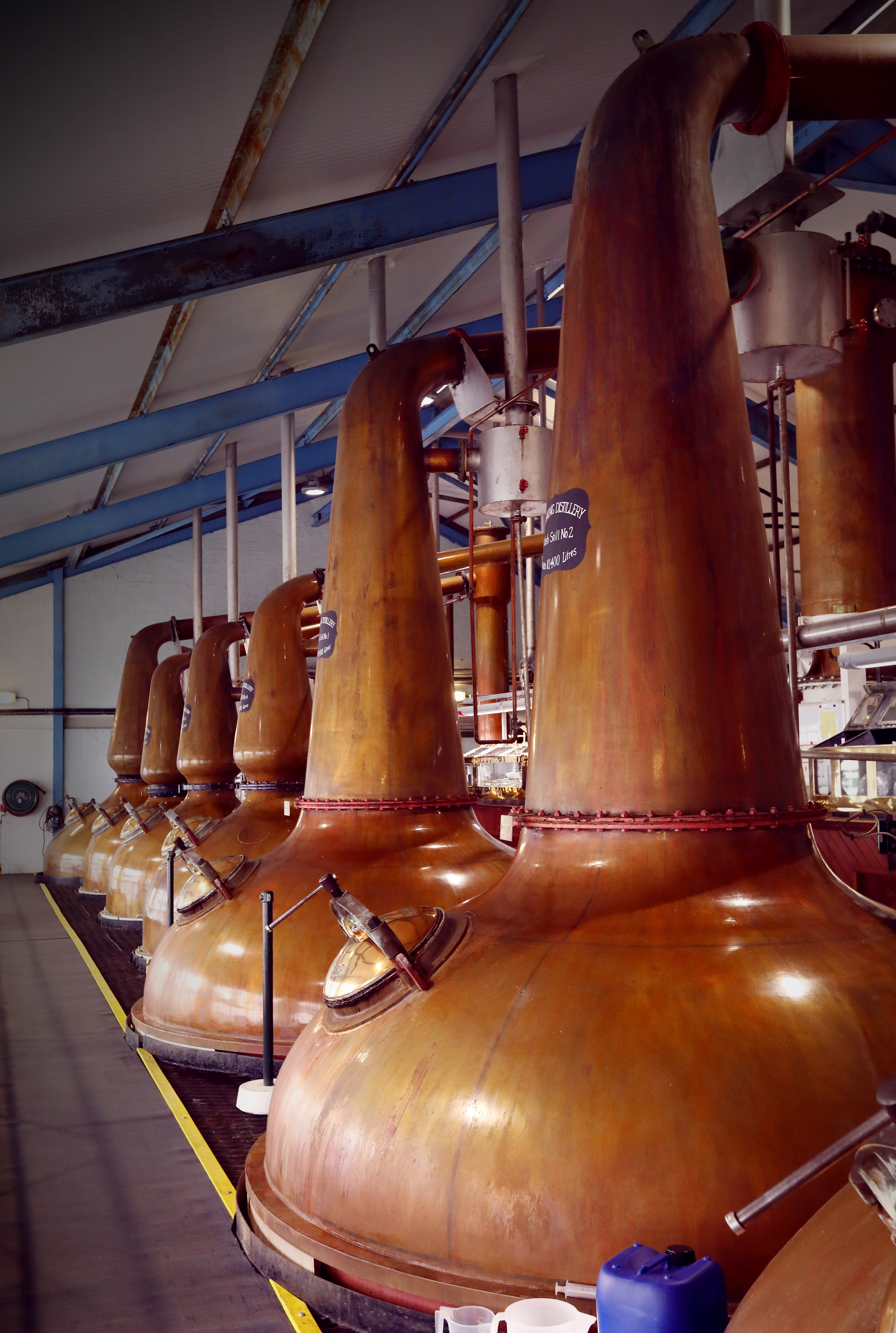
Whisky stills at the Laphroaig distillery in Scotland

Distillation of whisky has been performed in Scotland for centuries. The earliest written record of whisky production in Scotland from malted barley is an entry on the 1494 Exchequer Rolls, which reads "Eight bolls of malt to Friar John Cor, by order of the King, wherewith to make aqua vitae." The expression 'single' means that of "separate, distinct, not combined or taken together" and is adapted from the old Latin word singulum (individual).

In the following centuries, the various governments of Scotland began taxing the production of whisky, to the point that most of the spirit was produced illegally. However, in 1823, Parliament passed the Excise Act making commercial distillation legal and profitable. Punishments were imposed on landowners when unlicensed distilleries were found on their properties. The passing of the act encouraged many distillers to apply for licensees. An Upper Drummin farmer in the Glen Livet valley, George Smith, working under landlord the Duke of Gordon, was the first person in Scotland to take out a licence for a distillery under the new law, founding what would become the Glenlivet Distillery in 1824, making single malt Scotch. Others followed and by 1830, some 232 distilleries had become licensed in Scotland.

In the 1830s, Aeneas Coffey patented a refined version of a design originally created by Robert Stein, based on early innovations by Sir Anthony Perrier, for a column still. This new method produced whisky much more efficiently than the traditional pot stills. The new type of still allowed for continuous distillation, without the need for cleaning after each batch was made. This process made manufacturing more affordable by performing the equivalent of multiple distillation steps. The new still dramatically increased production; the whisky was less intense and smoother, though less flavoursome.

Quickly, merchants began blending the malt whisky with grain whisky distilled in the continuous stills, making the first blended Scotch whisky. The blended Scotch proved quite successful, less expensive to produce than malt, and exhibited more flavour and character than grain. The combination allowed the single malt producers to expand their operations, or to sell their products to other distillers who were making the blended products. After the 1850s, blended Scotch became far more popular than single malt whisky which eventually became a niche product for connoisseurs.

By the Victorian era, distilleries had become commonplace across Scotland. A common feature in design originating from Charles C. Doig was that of a pagoda like roof that improved the efficiency of distilleries by drawing off peat smoke in the malting process. Even today many distilleries possess a pagoda style roof on at least one building even if no malting takes place and in some instances, new pagoda roofs are added for aesthetic purposes. However, while whisky production was widespread in Scotland, the number of single malts was comparatively limited until the late 20th century. It was noted that in 1967, of 110 distilleries only 30 allowed the public to buy their whisky as a single malt. However, by the 1990s, changing demand had resulted in most distilleries offering a single malt to customers.

A 2016 report stated that only 20% of the Scotch whisky was made by companies owned in Scotland. The owners of the majority of products are Diageo, a London-based company, Pernod Ricard of France and Suntory Global Spirits, a Japanese-owned company. Independent distilleries owned by Scots companies make a substantial amount of whisky too, particularly William Grant & Sons, the largest of these. Grant produces 8% of all Scotch whisky, with brands including Glenfiddich and Balvenie. Glenfiddich is the best-selling single malt Scotch in the world; roughly 14 million bottles are sold annually.

In recent times, single malt has made up about 26% of the whisky exported to other countries; bulk spirits constituted about 5% and the balance has been blended whisky. The top importers of Scotch whisky are the US (21%), France (11%) and Singapore (6%).

=== Economic benefits ===
The Scotch Whisky Association estimated in 2019 that Scotland's whisky industry supported 40,000 jobs. The industry's contribution to the economy of the UK was estimated as £5.5 billion in 2018; the industry provided £3.8 billion in direct GVA (gross value added) to Scotland. Whisky tourism has also become significant and accounts for £68.3 million per year.

One factor may have negatively affected sales, an extra 3.9% duty on spirits imposed by the UK in 2017. By 2020, another factor may affect exports: the 25% increase in tariffs imposed by the U.S. in October 2019. By year-end 2017, however, exports totaled a record-breaking £4.37 billion, an increase of 8.9% over 2016. Of that total, single malt Scotch accounted for £1.17 billion in exports, a 14% increase over 2016.

Exports in 2018 again increased, by 7.8% by value, and 3.6% in number of bottles, in spite of the duty imposed in 2017; exports grew to a record level, £4.7 billion. The US tariffs were not yet in place at that time, however. Of the total exports in 2018, single malt accounted for £1.3 billion.

Whisky tourism has also become significant and accounts for £68.3 million per year; the percentage contribution to this industry by single malt Scotch distilleries, however, has not been released. The tourism has been a real plus to the economy, and of significant value especially in remote rural areas, according to Fiona Hyslop MSP, Cabinet Secretary for Culture, Tourism and External Affairs. "The Scottish Government is committed to working with partners like the Scotch Whisky Association to increase our tourism offer and encourage more people to visit our distilleries," the Secretary added.

== Regions ==
Single malt Scotch geography

Flavour, aroma, and finish differ widely between single malts. Single malt Scotch whiskies are categorised into the following whisky-producing regions: Campbeltown single malts, Highland single malts, Island single malts (a sub-section of the Highland region), Islay single malts, Lowland single malts, and Speyside single malts

== Independent bottlers ==
Independent bottlers buy casks of single malts and either bottle them immediately or store them for future use. Many of the independents began as stores and merchants who bought the whisky in bulk and bottled it for individual sales. Many distilleries do not bottle their whisky as a single malt, so independent bottlings are the only way the single malt gets to market. The bottling process is generally the same, but independents generally do not have access to the distillery's water source, so another source is used to dilute the whisky. Additionally, independents are generally less concerned with maintaining a particular style, so more single year and single cask bottlings are produced.

Established independent bottlers include Duncan Taylor, Murray McDavid, Douglas Laing & Co, and Blackadder.

== See also ==
- List of distilleries in Scotland
- Outline of whisky
- Single malt whisky
- Whisky
