= William Grant (businessman) =

Scottish distiller and entrepreneur (1839-1923)

- Born: 19 December 1839; Dufftown, Scotland
- Died: 5 January 1923 (aged 83)
- Occupation: Entrepreneur

William Grant (19 December 1839 – 5 January 1923) was a Scottish distiller and entrepreneur who founded William Grant & Sons, the manufacturer of Glenfiddich, as such, the first company in the world to market a true single malt whisky and a leading brand today.

== Life ==
Grant was descended from Clan Grant, which arrived in Speyside after being rewarded with land for "services to the king". In 1745, three brothers fought in the Jacobite rebellion against Hanover. Alexander Grant survived the Battle of Culloden but had to flee to Banffshire where he was hidden by a clan chief.

Alexander Grant's great-grandson, William Grant, was born in 1839 in Dufftown, Scotland. When he was seven he began herding the family cattle in the hills. He then worked as an apprentice shoemaker and a limeworks employee. He did, however, receive a good education. Consequently, in 1866 he became a bookkeeper at the local Distillery. He gained an appreciation for the production of whisky and became manager of the distillery, where he worked for 20 years. His wife, Elizabeth, had nine children.

Throughout this period of his life he saved money to set himself up as a distiller. In 1886, he quit his job, purchased the necessary land, materials and machines, and built the Glenfiddich Distillery with the help of his 9 children. On Christmas day in 1887, his distillery began operation, pioneering single malt Scotch whisky. Until Glenfiddich only blended brands were common.

Glenfiddich whisky from William Grant & Sons proved successful and so in 1892, he built a second distillery next door in Dufftown, known as the Balvenie Distillery. His daughter Isabella married Charles Gordon, who became the company's first salesman. In 1909, Charles Gordon began travelling to export Glenfiddich around the world. By 1914, he had established distribution networks in 30 countries, and today the company exports to 180 countries.

== Death ==
William Grant died in 1923. In the 2008 Sunday Times Rich List, his family were ranked 86th richest in the UK, and 3rd richest in Scotland. In the Sunday Times Rich List 2013, the Grant and Gordon family were listed as the second richest family in Scotland.

His grandson William Grant, Lord Grant (1909–1972) was an advocate who served as Solicitor General for Scotland, Lord Advocate, and Lord Justice Clerk from 1962 to 1972.

== Supercentenarian granddaughter ==
His granddaughter was a woman named Janet Roberts (née Gordon; 13 August 1901 - 6 April 2012) who lived to be supercentenarian. Bottles of whisky were produced in her honour to mark her 100th, 105th, 107th and 110th birthdays. She died in her home at the advanced age of 110. She was the oldest living person in Scotland.
