= William Grant & Sons =

Scottish alcohol producer

William Grant & Sons Ltd.

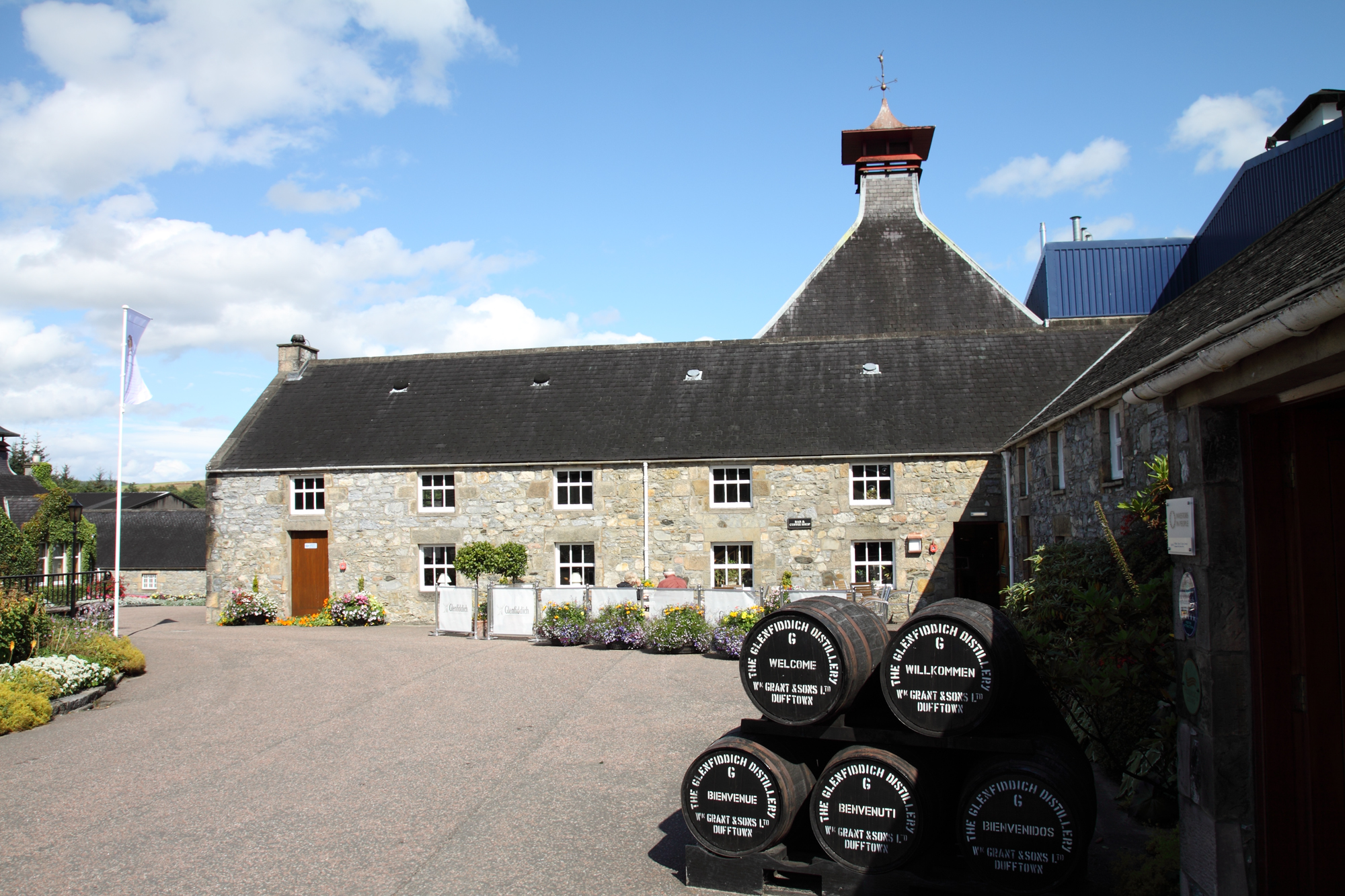
- Glenfiddich distillery
- Industry: Drink industry
- Founded: 1887; 139 years ago
- Founder: William Grant
- Headquarters: Dufftown, Scotland
- Area served: Worldwide
- Products: Alcoholic drinks
- Website: www.williamgrant.com

William Grant & Sons Ltd. is a family-owned company that distills Scotch whisky and other selected categories of spirits headquartered in Dufftown, Scotland. It was established in 1887 by William Grant, and is run by Grant's descendants as of 2024. It is the largest of the handful of Scotch whisky distillers remaining in family ownership.

The company is the third largest producer of Scotch whisky (8% market share), shipping about 7.6 million cases per year, with brands including Glenfiddich and Balvenie. The first and second largest, respectively, are Diageo (34.4%), and Pernod Ricard. The company is registered at The Glenfiddich distillery in Dufftown. The main operational headquarters are located at Strathclyde Business Park, North Lanarkshire. Sales and marketing headquarters are in Richmond, London. The company is a member of the Scotch Whisky Association.

The master blender of Grant's is Brian Kinsman, who succeeded David Stewart who had been in his post for 47 years, the longest serving master blender with one distiller in the industry.

William Grant & Sons has won the Queen's Award to Industry for Outstanding Export Achievement.

== History ==
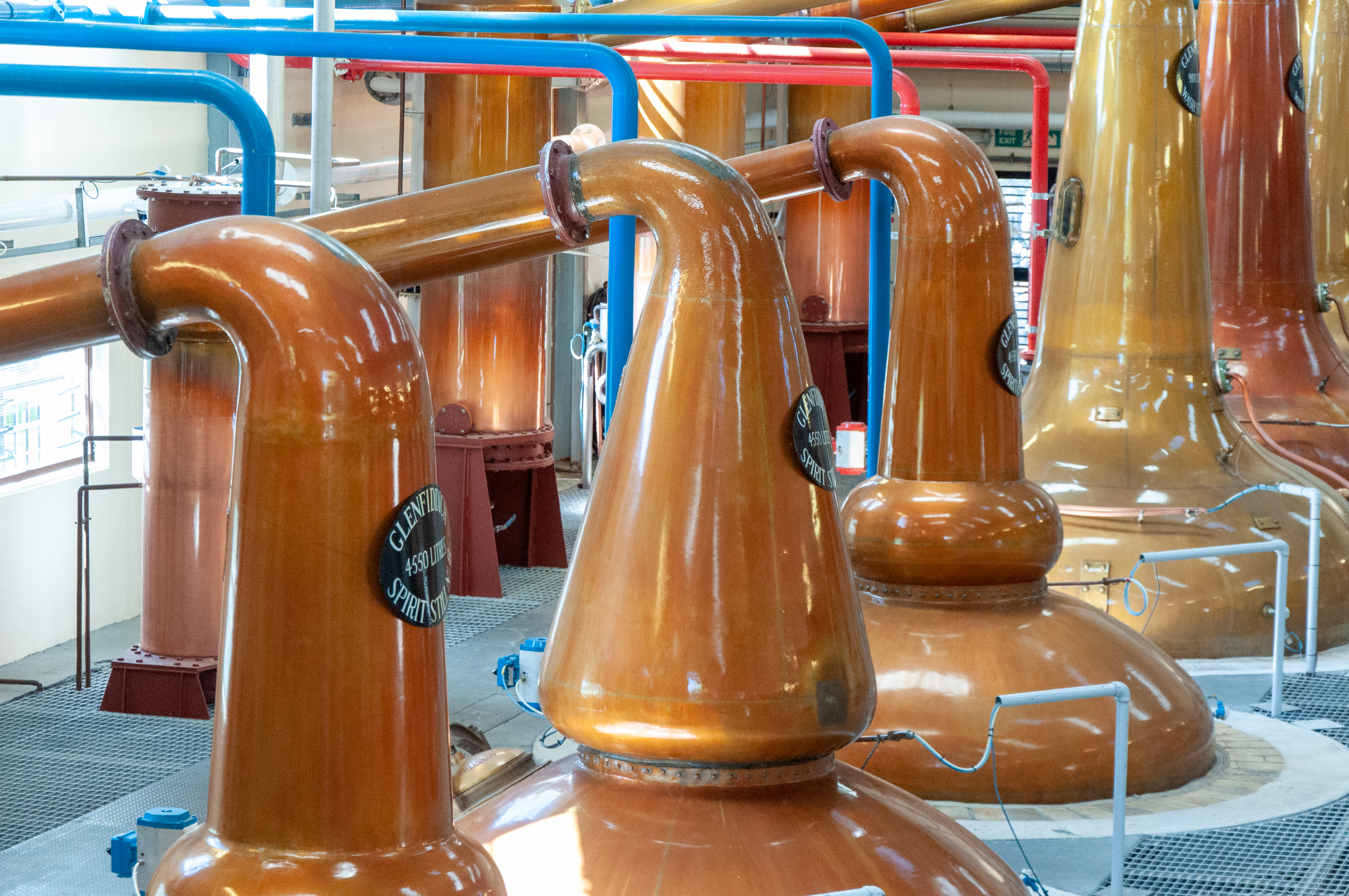
Spirit stills, Glenfiddich distillery

William Grant was born in Dufftown in 1839. In 1886, Grant and his six sons started construction of Glenfiddich distillery. On Christmas Day, 1887, the distillery was operational.

In 1892, William Grant & Sons built a second neighbouring distillery called Balvenie.

In 1963 Girvan grain whisky distillery was built in South Ayrshire, Scotland.

In 1990, William Grant & Sons founded the Kininvie distillery.

In 1992 William Grant & Sons bought the Convalmore distillery, to increase warehousing capacity for Glenfiddich.

In 1999 William Grant & Sons launched Hendrick's Gin, a brand of gin produced at the Girvan distillery, Scotland.

In 1999, the company acquired Highland Distillers through a partnership with Edrington Group taking a majority interest (the 1887 Company).

In October 2002, the company acquired the Canadian whisky brand Gibson's Finest.

In 2005, William Grant & Sons established a distillery in Borgarnes, Iceland to make vodka. The brand was named Reyka.

In October 2005, the company bought Raynal & Cie and acquired the brandy brands Three Barrels and The Raynal.

In 2009, Ailsa Bay distillery was built to meet needs for malt whisky for blended whiskies.

In May 2010 the group bought four brands from C&C Group, including Tullamore D.E.W., for €300m. In September they sold the three minor brands (Irish Mist, Carolans, Frangelico) to Gruppo Campari for €129m, so in effect, Grants paid €171m for the Tullamore D.E.W. brand and its production facilities.

In July 2014 Grant's donated "in the region of £100,000" to the unionist campaign group Better Together, with the company being "said to have also donated smaller sums of money to other groups who are campaigning for a 'No' vote," ahead of the Scottish independence referendum.

In September 2014, William Grant & Sons, bought Drambuie liqueur for an estimated price of about £100 million.

In March 2020, the company switched production at three of its distilleries to create approximately five million litres of ethanol over an eight-week period to produce hand sanitiser during the COVID-19 pandemic. In that same month, William Grant & Sons closed all of its visitor centres due to the same pandemic. In June 2020, the company reopened some of its visitor centres with increased hygiene measures.

In September 2020, Fistful of Bourbon the company first bourbon was launched in the American market.

In February 2022, William Grant & Sons launched its first low-alcoholic spirits Atopia.

In September 2023, it was announced William Grant & Sons had acquired the Guildford-headquartered gin producer, Silent Pool Distillers.

In September 2024, William Grant & Sons reached an agreement to buy The Famous Grouse and Naked Malt from Edrington, subject to customary regulatory approvals. The sale was finalized on July 1, 2025.

== Distilleries ==
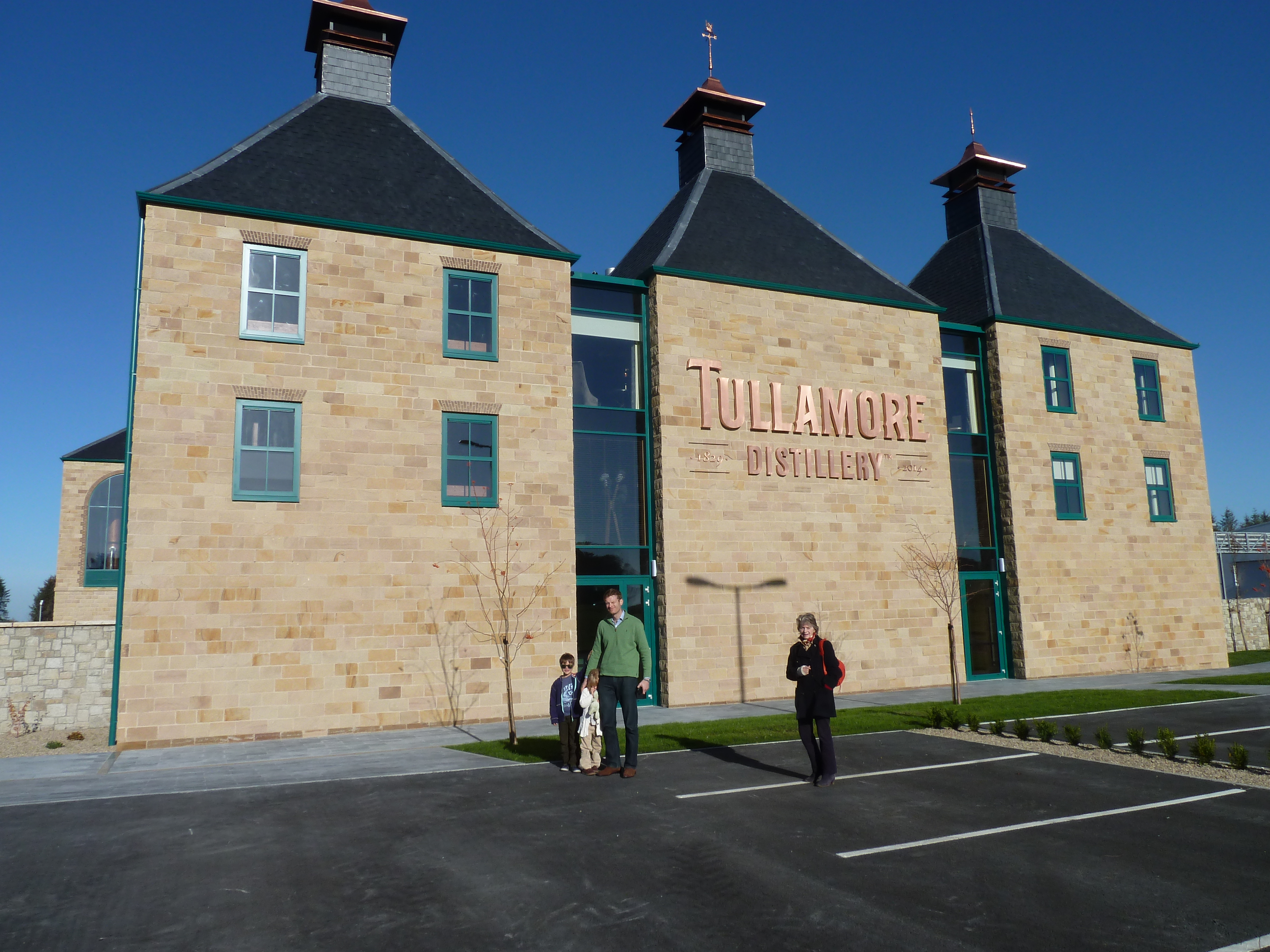
Tullamore distillery

Distilleries owned by William Grant & Sons:

- Ailsa Bay distillery
- Balvenie distillery
- Convalmore distillery is a former whisky distillery in Dufftown, closing operations in 1985. William Grant & Sons bought the distillery in 1992, for the warehouses, to increase warehousing capacity for Glenfiddich. The Convalmore distillery produced whisky for other brands. The name Convalmore however is used for selected whiskies, although the distillery never produced a whisky under their own name. The brand name is owned by Diageo.
- Girvan grain distillery
- Glenfiddich distillery
- Kininvie distillery
- Ladyburn distillery closed in 1975
- Tullamore distillery (Ireland)

== Brands ==
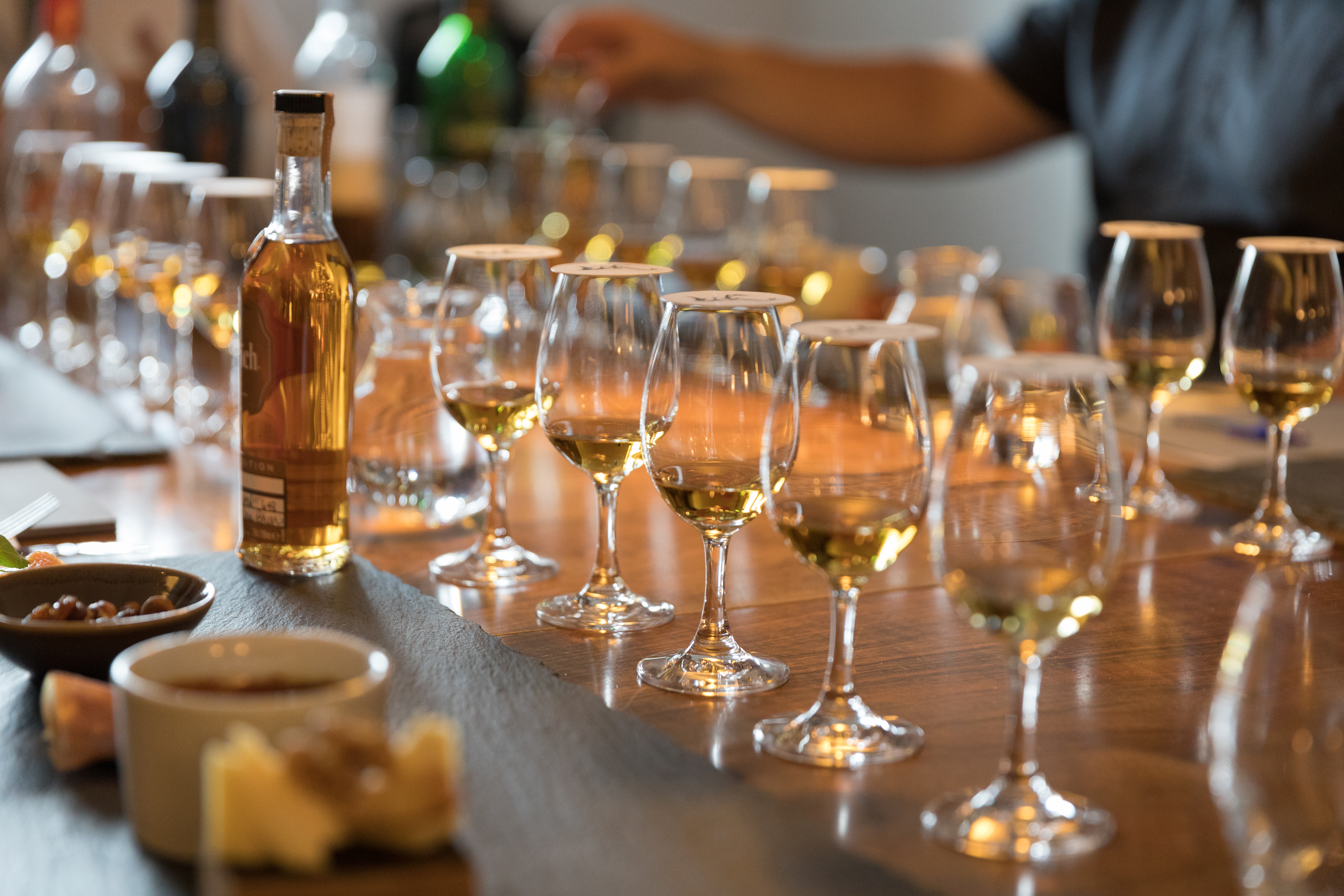
Glenfiddich Distillery tasting event

The company's leading single malt Scotch brand is Glenfiddich, the best-selling single malt Scotch in the world as of 2016. Roughly 1.22 million cases of Glenfiddich were sold in 2017. Another Grant single malt Scotch whisky also made the top ten list of best-selling Scotch whiskies in 2017: The Balvenie (#6). Another very popular blended malt whisky is Monkey Shoulder. In 2021 the company's leading blended whisky, Grant's, was the number three in the world's best-selling Scotch whiskies behind Johnnie Walker and Ballantine's.

William Grant & Sons beverage brands include:

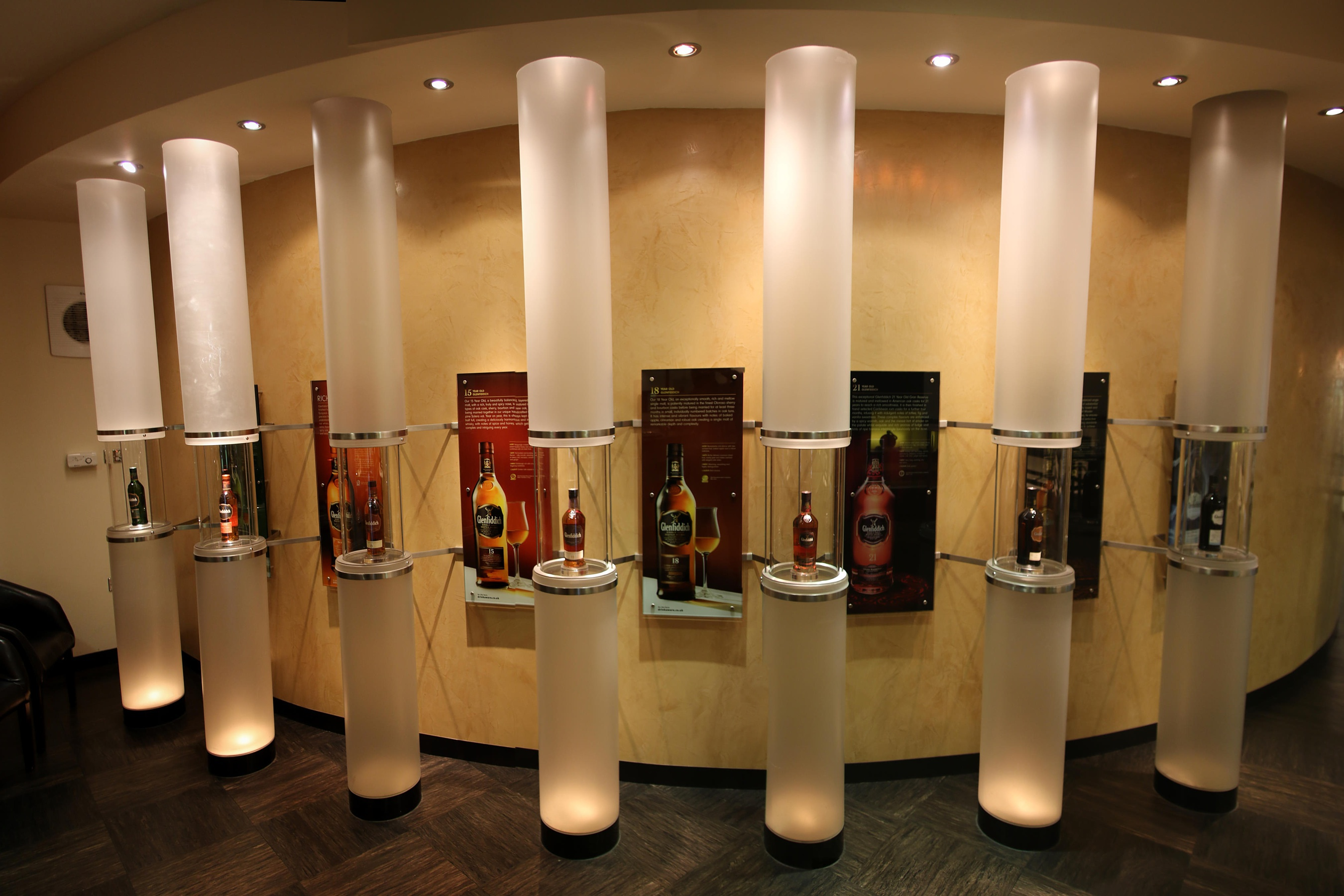
Glenfiddich distillery exhibition

- Scotch whisky:
  - Single malt Scotch whisky: Aerstone, Ailsa Bay, Glenfiddich, Kininvie, The Balvenie
  - Blended malt Scotch whisky: Monkey Shoulder, Naked Malt
  - Blended Scotch whisky: The Famous Grouse, Grant's, House of Hazelwood, Clan MacGregor, Wildmoor
- American whiskey: Fistful of Bourbon, Hudson Whiskey
- Canadian whisky: Gibson's Finest
- Irish whiskey: Tullamore D.E.W.
- Brandy: Three Barrels, The Raynal
- Gin: Hendrick's, Verano
- Liqueur: Drambuie, Solerno, The Knot
- Low-alcoholic spirit: Atopia
- Mixed drinks: Taboo
- Rum: Sailor Jerry, Old Vatted Demerara (O.V.D.), Woods Old Navy, Flor de Caña
- Tequila: Milagro
- Vodka: Reyka

=== Rare whiskies ===
William Grant & Sons produces a number of rare whiskies, most of which are described in the articles on Glenfiddich, Grant's and The Balvenie. However, their rare whiskies also include:

- Girvan First Batch Distillation (from casks filled in 1964)
- Ladyburn (from Ladyburn distillery, closed in 1975)
- Snow Phoenix (a one-off by Glenfiddich produced as a blend of all the whisky—between three and 50 years in age—recovered after heavy snow destroyed a warehouse where the whisky was being aged)

Other rare whiskies have been bottled as private vintages for Concorde, Queen Mary 2 and the Royal Danish Wedding.

=== Highland Distillers brands ===
William Grant & Sons and the Edrington Group took Highland Distillers private in 1999 forming the 1887 Company, in which William Grant and Sons hold a 30% stake.

Brands owned by Highland Distillers at that time:

- Black Bottle, this brand was sold subsequently to Burn Stewart Distillers in 2004
- Gloag's London Dry Gin, brand name owned by Edrington
- Highland Park, brand name now owned by Edrington
- The Famous Grouse, brand name formerly owned by Edrington now owned by William Grant & Sons again
- The Macallan, brand name now owned by Edrington

=== Other brands ===
- Virgin Vodka, a now defunct brand which Grant's co-developed with Richard Branson's Virgin Group.

== Notable personnel ==
- David Stewart, former master blender
- Charlotte Voisey, global head of ambassadors
