= Blended whiskey =

Product of blending different types of whiskeys

A blended whiskey (or blended whisky) is a blend of different types of whiskeys and sometimes also neutral spirits, colorings, and flavorings. It is usually a mixture of one or more higher-quality straight or single malt whiskeys with less expensive spirits and other ingredients. It typically priced lower than non-blended whiskies, although there are more expensive "premium" varieties.

Some examples of blended whiskey include Canadian Club, Canadian Mist, Jameson Irish Whiskey, Seagram's Seven, Kessler Whiskey, Hibiki, and Scotch blends such as Johnnie Walker, Ballantine's, Grant's, and Chivas Regal.

== Ingredients and uses ==
Higher proof spirits with less time aging are usually much less expensive to produce than straight whiskeys or single malt whiskeys and are often the primary spirits in blends, along with more premium whiskies and other ingredients added for flavoring.

Most cocktails and mixed drinks that contain whiskey are made using economically priced blended whiskeys rather than higher priced whiskeys, primarily because the presence of the other ingredients makes the subtleties of the taste of the whiskey less critical to the overall taste of the drink.

== Age statements ==
Most blended whiskeys do not list an age, although the regulations governing its production in some countries specify a minimum aging requirement. All spirits in a Canadian, Scottish, or Irish whiskey must be aged at least three years, and any age statement refers to the minimum age of the spirits used in the blend. In the United States, the age statement only refers to the minimum age of the straight whiskey — which must comprise at least 20% of the content — used within the blend. As neutral spirits are not considered whiskeys, they do not have to be aged at all for the production of U.S. blended whiskey.

== Other regulations by country ==
=== Canada ===
Most Canadian whiskies are blends. Any grain spirit aged for at least three years in Canada may be called Canadian whisky. Regulations do not specify any distillation limit, although in practice, it differs little from the Scottish and Irish limit of 94.8%, as the purity of neutral grain spirit has a practical limit of approximately that value. Whiskies with a lower distillation proof are also often included for flavor, with rye whisky being characteristically included. Canadian whisky may contain both caramel coloring and flavoring.

=== Ireland ===
Irish blended whiskey is defined by the Republic of Ireland's Department of Agriculture, Food and the Marine as a blend of two or more different whiskey types among the pot still, malt, and grain whiskey categories. Its production usually includes Irish grain whiskey that is produced from a distillate that "is much less intense in flavor when compared to pot still distillates ... at a strength of c. 94.5% vol."

=== Scotland ===
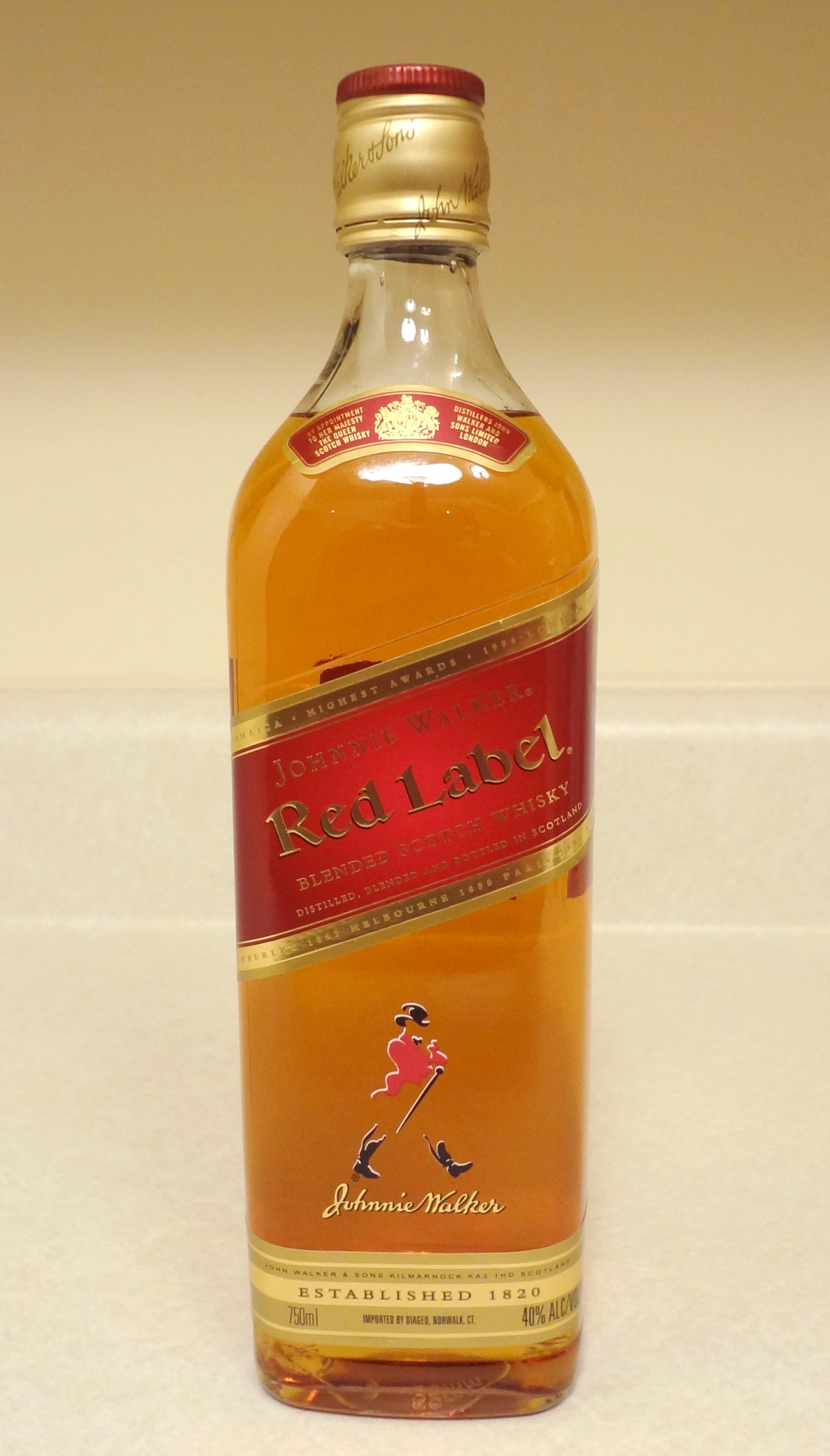
Johnnie Walker Red Label, the most popular brand of blended Scotch worldwide

Under Scotch Whisky Regulations, Blended Malt Scotch Whisky (Note: Formerly known as a vatted malt, a term no longer permitted.) means a blend of two or more single malt Scotch whiskies that have been distilled at more than one distillery; Blended Grain Scotch Whisky means a blend of two or more single grain Scotch whiskies that have been distilled at more than one distillery; and Blended Scotch Whisky means a blend of one or more single malt Scotch whiskies with one or more single grain Scotch whiskies. The regulations also allow the addition of caramel color, regardless of whether the final product is labeled as blended or not.

=== United States ===
American "blended whiskey" – alternatively labeled as "whiskey – a blend" – must contain a minimum of 20% straight whiskey. Blended whiskey that contains a minimum of 51% straight whiskey of one particular grain type (i.e., rye, malt, wheat, or bourbon whiskey) includes the grain type in its label description (e.g., "blended rye whiskey" or "blended bourbon whiskey"). Spirits containing less than 20% straight whiskey but greater than 5% whiskey of any kind can be labeled "spirit whiskey".

American "blended whiskey" is not to be confused with American whiskey labeled as a "blend of straight whiskeys". A "blend of straight whiskeys" is a mixture of one or more straight whiskeys that either includes straight whiskeys produced in different U.S. states or coloring and flavoring additives (and possibly other approved "blending materials") or both, but does not contain neutral grain spirits.

== See also ==
- Outline of whisky
- Blended malt whisky
