= Blended malt whisky =

Blend of different single malt whiskies from different distilleries

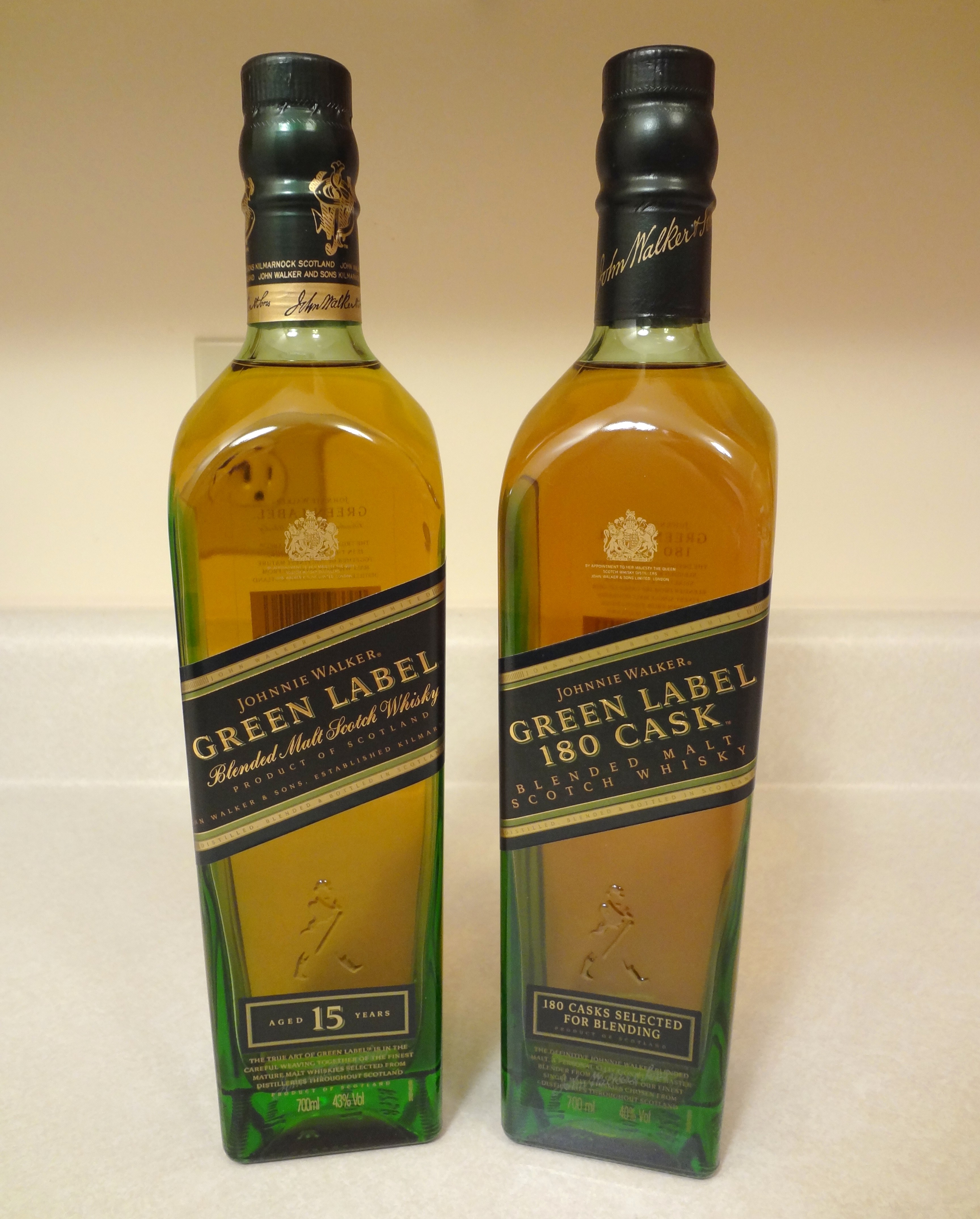
Bottles of Johnnie Walker blended malt whiskies

A blended malt, formerly called a vatted malt, or pure malt, is a blend of different single malt whiskies from different distilleries. These terms are most commonly used in reference to Scotch whisky, or whisky in that style, such as Japanese whisky.

== Blended ==
The legally anachronistic term vatted was used to describe the blending process but does not automatically equate to creation of a vatted malt. Likewise, the use of the term "blended" did not necessarily refer to the creation of what is typically referred to as a blended whisky. A blending of different casks or batches of single malt whisky produced from the same distillery is still considered a single malt whisky.

== Malt ==
The "malt" part of the term refers to the use of a malted grain to make the whisky. In Scotch whisky, this grain is required to be barley. Outside Scotland, whisky is produced from other malted grains, such as malted rye, and the term "rye malt whisky" is specifically recognized along with (barley-based) malt whisky in the code of federal regulations for whisky in the United States. Moreover, in much of the world, whisky is often made using grain that is not malted (for example, using maize in a corn mash). In practice, unless a different grain is specifically mentioned, a malt whisky is assumed to be made from barley.

== Scotch whisky ==
In the case of Scotch whisky, blended malts do not contain any whisky made from grains other than barley or spirits distilled using continuous distillation, unlike products labelled as "blended whisky". For the Scotch whisky industry, the terms vatted malt or pure malt have been reclassified as "blended malts" per the Scotch Whisky Regulations of 2009, and it has become unlawful to label Scotch Whisky using the prior terminology. When an age statement appears on the label of a Scotch blended malt whisky (or any other Scotch whisky), it refers to the amount of time spent in wooden aging casks for the youngest (i.e., the least aged) whisky used in the product.

== See also ==
- Outline of whisky
