= Grain whisky =

Type of alcoholic beverage

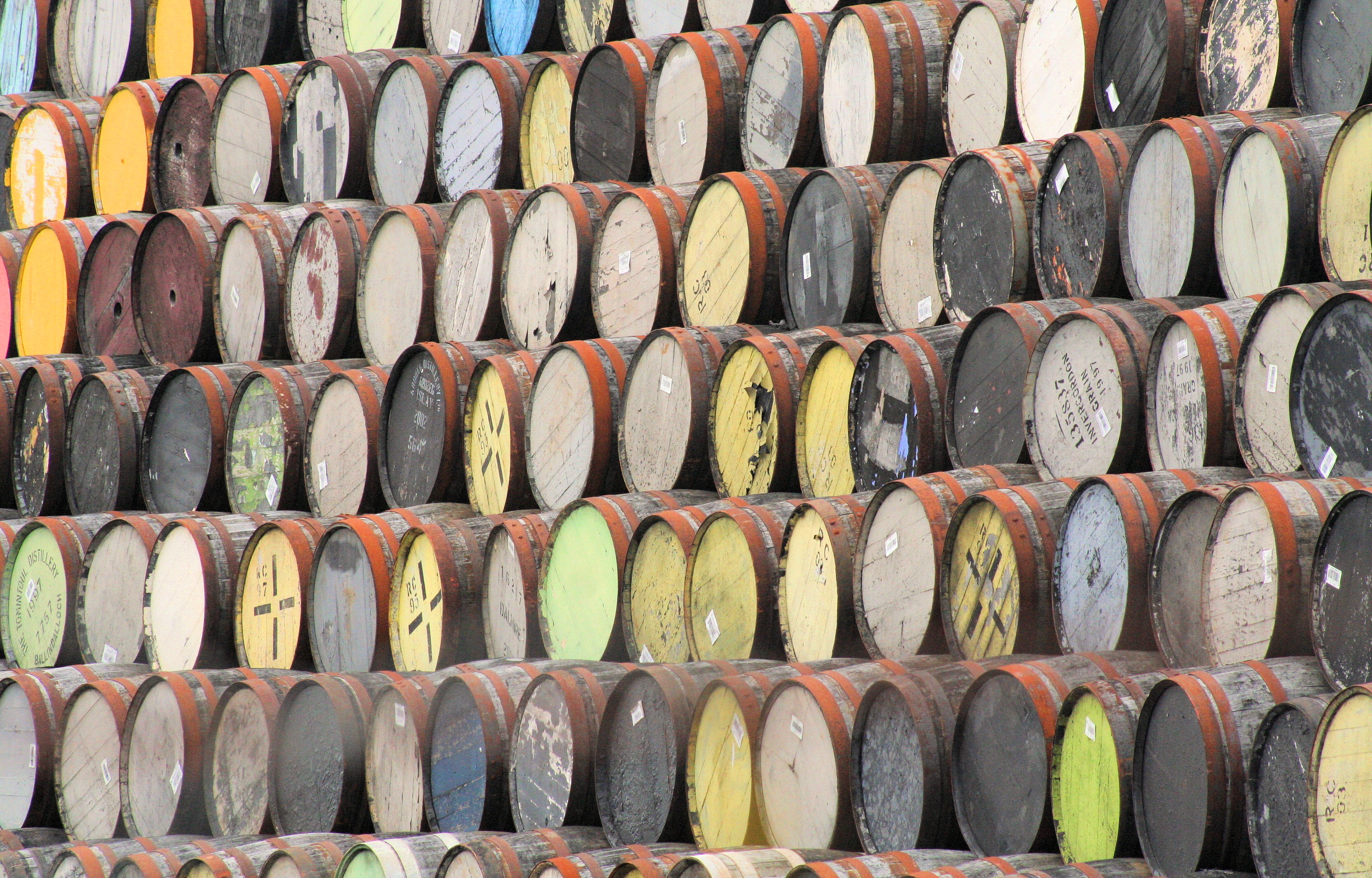
Barrels waiting to be filled with grain whisky at the Whyte and MacKay Grain Distillery in Invergordon

Grain whisky normally refers to any whisky made, at least in part, from grains other than malted barley. Frequently used grains include maize, wheat, and rye. Grain whiskies usually contain some malted barley to provide enzymes needed for mashing and are required to include it if they are produced in Ireland or Scotland. Whisky made only from malted barley is generally called "malt whisky" rather than grain whisky. Most American and Canadian whiskies are grain whiskies.

== Definition ==
Under the regulations governing the production of both Irish and Scotch whisky, malt whisky must be produced from a mash of 100% malted barley and must be distilled in a pot still. In Scotland, a whisky that uses other malted or unmalted cereals in the mash in addition to malted barley is termed a grain whisky. In Ireland, where regulations define "pot still whiskey" as one distilled from a specific mixed mash of at least 30% malted barley, at least 30% unmalted barley, and other unmalted cereals in a pot still, "grain whisky" refers to whisky produced from a mixed mash of no more than 30% malted barley in a column still.

In both countries, grain whisky is typically distilled in a continuous column still in a manner which results in a higher percentage of alcohol by volume (ABV), but a less flavourful spirit than that derived from a pot still. As a result, grain whisky is rarely bottled by itself in either country, but is instead used mainly for blending with malt or pot still whisky to create blended whiskies, which now account for more than 90% of both countries' whisky sales. The comparative lightness of the clearer, more neutral flavoured grain whisky is used in blends to smooth out the often harsher characteristics of single malts and single pot still whiskeys. Occasionally well-aged grain whiskies are released as single grain whisky if made at one distillery or blended grain whisky if combining spirits from multiple distilleries.

Outside Ireland and Scotland, the use of continuous column stills and the use of a non-barley mash are not so closely associated with the production of "light" whisky (whisky with little flavour due to distillation at a very high ABV). For example, nearly all American whiskey is produced using column stills, and each American whiskey that is labelled as "straight whiskey" (including straight Bourbon and straight rye) is required to use a distillation level not exceeding 80% ABV. In the United States, whiskey produced at greater than 80% ABV is formally classified as "light whiskey" and cannot be labelled with the name of a grain or called malt, bourbon or straight.

== See also ==
- Outline of whisky
