= Glenfiddich =

Scotch whisky distillery

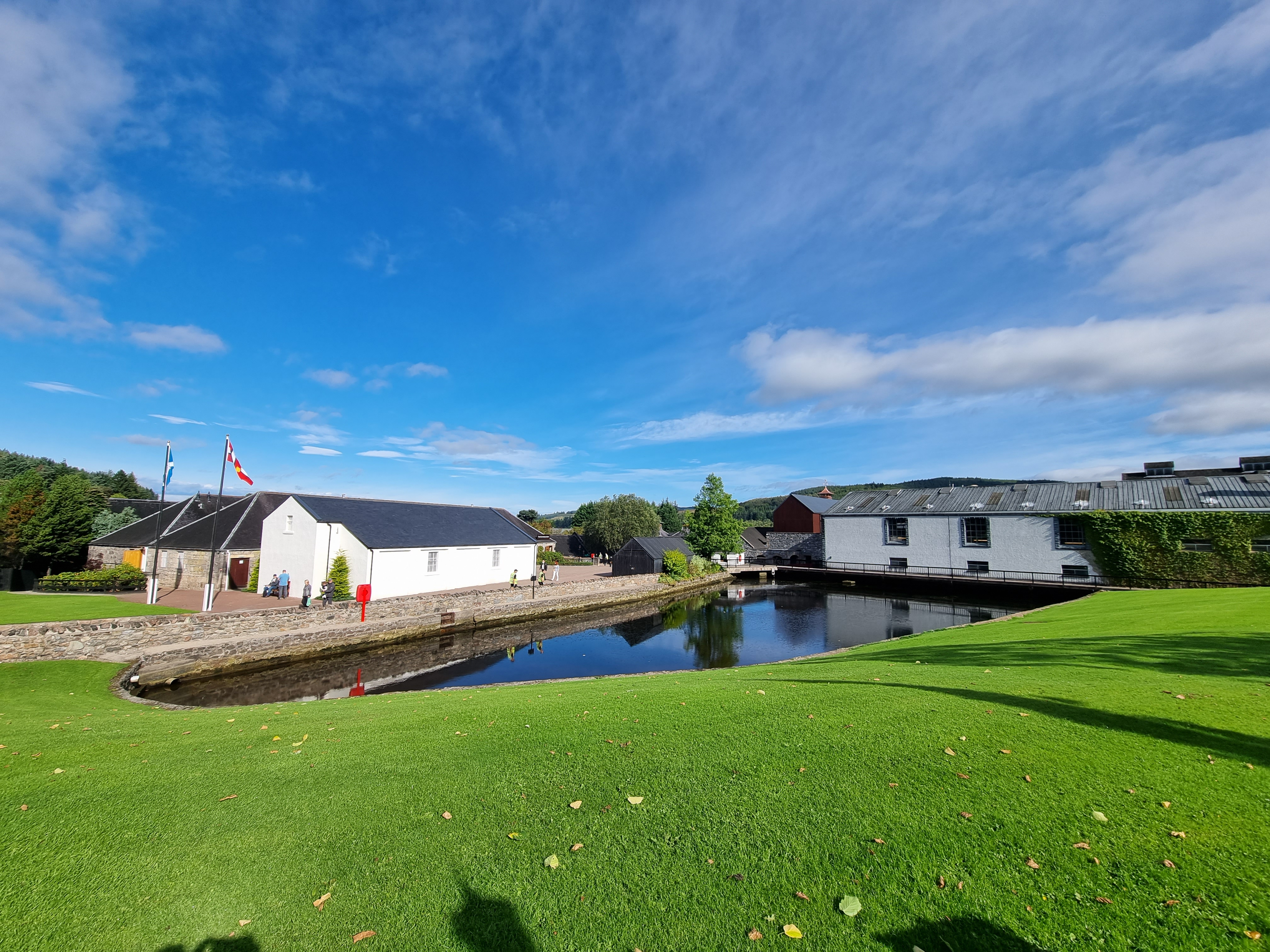

Region: Speyside
- Location: Dufftown, Moray, Scotland
- Coordinates: 57°27′13″N 03°07′43″W
- Owner: William Grant & Sons
- Founded: 1886; 140 years ago
- Status: Operational
- Water source: The Robbie Dhu Spring
- No. of stills: 16 wash stills 27 spirit stills
- Capacity: 21 million litres
- Website: glenfiddich.com

Original Twelve
- Age(s): 12 years old
- ABV: 40.0%

Bourbon Barrel Reserve
- Age(s): 14 years old
- ABV: 43.0%

Solera Fifteen
- Age(s): 15 years old
- ABV: 40.0%

Small Batch Eighteen
- Age(s): 18 years old
- ABV: 40.0%

Map
- Glenfiddich (Moray)

Glenfiddich (Scottish English: [ɡlɛnˈfɪdɪx]) is a Speyside single malt Scotch whisky distillery located in the Scottish burgh of Dufftown in Moray, Scotland. It is owned by William Grant & Sons. The name Glenfiddich derives from the Scottish Gaelic Gleann Fhiodhaich meaning "valley of the deer", which is reflected in Glenfiddich's stag logo.

== History ==
Glenfiddich logo

The Glenfiddich Distillery was founded in 1886 by William Grant in Dufftown, Scotland, in the glen of the River Fiddich. The Glenfiddich single malt whisky first ran from the stills on Christmas Day, 1887.

In the 1920s, with prohibition in force in the US, Glenfiddich was one of a very small number of distilleries to increase production. This put them in a strong position to meet the sudden rise in demand for fine aged whiskies that came with the repeal of prohibition.

In the 1950s, the Grant family built up an onsite infrastructure that included coppersmiths to maintain the copper stills, and a dedicated cooperage that is now one of the very few remaining in distilleries. In 1956 the Grant's brand launched the now-iconic triangular bottle, designed by Hans Schleger.

Following difficult times in the 1960s and 1970s, many small, independent distillers were bought up or went out of business. In order to survive, W. Grant & Sons expanded their production of the drink, and introduced advertising campaigns and a visitors' centre. In this period they also decided to begin marketing single malt as a premium brand in its own right, effectively creating the modern single malt whisky category with the 1963 introduction of Glenfiddich single malt to the United States and other foreign markets.

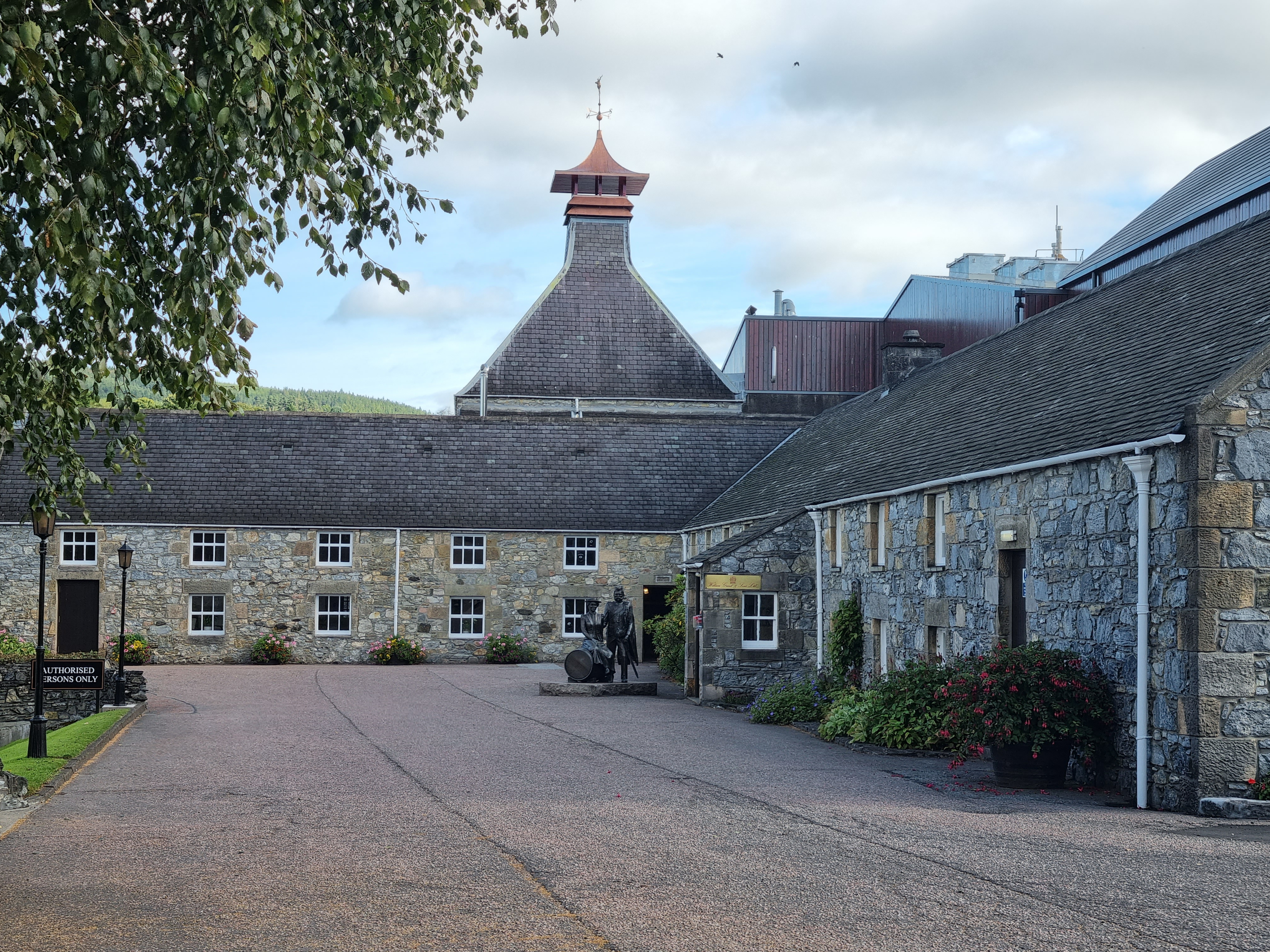
The distillery pagoda and former maltings in 2021

Later, W. Grant & Sons was one of the first distilleries to package its bottles in tubes and gift tins, as well as recognising the importance of the duty-free market for spirits. This marketing strategy was successful, and Glenfiddich has since become the world's best-selling single malt. It is sold in 180 countries, and accounts for about 35% of single malt sales.

Glenfiddich is currently managed by the fifth generation of William Grant's descendants.

In September 2014, William Grant & Sons agreed to acquire Drambuie for an undisclosed price rumoured to be in the region of £100 million.

In 2015, Glenfiddich commissioned ad agency Gravity Thinking to create a high tech YouTube campaign titled The Finishing Touch to promote the relaunch of their 21yo single malt, aged in Caribbean Reserva Rum Casks. The video showed a levitron isolating a single drop of whisky in a mid-air suspended animation, and featured Puerto Rican singer Calma Carmona performing the Franz Ferdinand song "Love Illumination" with the orchestra of the Scottish Opera arranged and conducted by Derek Williams. By the end of the campaign, the video had garnered more than 1.7 million YouTube hits.

Since 2002, Glenfiddich has had an Artists in Residence (AiR) programme with a total budget of £130,000 allowing artists to stay and work in the distillery each year. In 2019 there were eight artists in residence and in 2021, there were six artists in residence.

In 2021, the distillery began converting distillery trucks to run on biogas made from the distillery waste products.

== Production and location ==
The Glenfiddich distillery produces Glenfiddich whisky in Dufftown, Moray.

Glenfiddich is a single malt Scotch whisky, this means the whisky was distilled at a single distillery using a pot still distillation process and must be made from a mash of malted barley.

Onsite there are 43 distinctively-shaped "swan neck" copper pot stills. These stills are smaller than those now in use at most other major distilleries. All stills are handmade and Glenfiddich employs a team of craftsmen and coppersmiths to maintain them. These stills have a capacity of around 21,000,000 litres of spirit.

The water source for Glenfiddich Whisky is The Robbie Dhu springs nearby to the distillery.

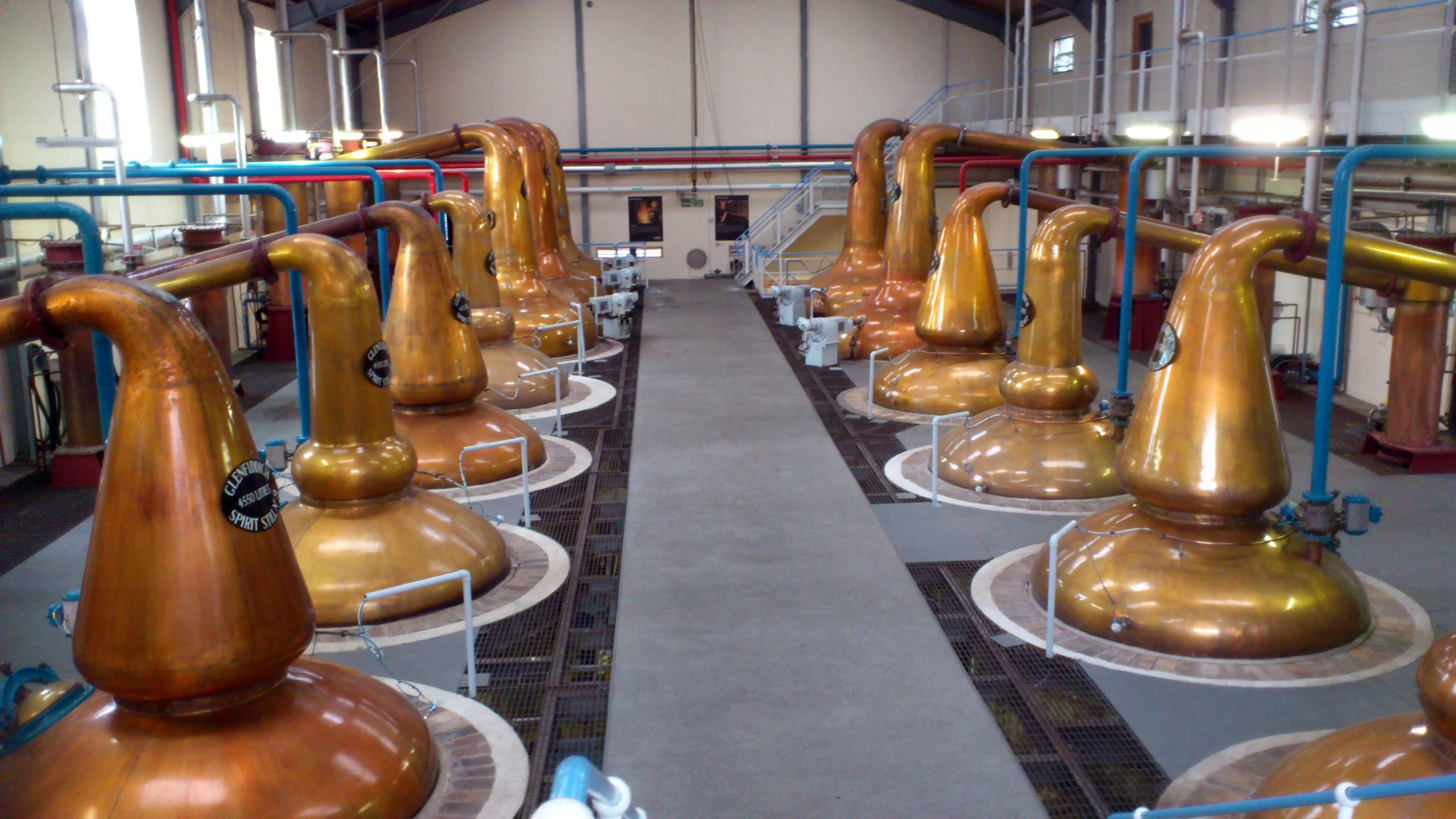
Swan necked copper stills in the distillery

Glenfiddich is matured in many different casks, such as:

1. Rum casks from the Caribbean
2. Bourbon whiskey barrels from America
3. Sherry butts from Jerez de la Frontera in Spain

Once the spirit has matured, the casks are emptied and the whisky is "cut" with pure Robbie Dhu spring water.

Glenfiddich has a bottling hall onsite along with a large bottling plant in Bellshill.

Glenfiddich is a distillery in Scotland's Malt Whisky Trail, a tourism initiative featuring seven working Speyside distilleries including Glenfiddich, a historic distillery (Dallas Dhu, now a museum) and the Speyside Cooperage.

== Whiskies ==
Glenfiddich Age-Statement Whiskies, by years of production, since 1992
Age	1992–1994	1994–1996	1996–1998	1998–2000	2000–2002	2002–2004	2004–2006	2006–2008	2008–2010	2010–2012	2012–2014	2014–
12 Year Old						Caoran Reserve			Glenfiddich; 12 Year Old			
14 Year Old										Glenfiddich; Rich Oak		
15 Year Old	Classic			Solera Reserve					Glenfiddich; 15 Year Old			
15 Year Old		15 Year Old Cask Strength (renamed Distillery Edition)										
18 Year Old	Excellence			Ancient Reserve					Glenfiddich; 18 Year Old			
21 Year Old					Millennium Reserve	Havana Reserve	Gran Reserva		Glenfiddich; 21 Year Old			
26 Year Old												Glenfiddich; Excellence
30 Year Old					Glenfiddich; 30 Year Old							
38 Year Old											Glenfiddich; Ultimate 38	
40 Year Old					Glenfiddich; 40 Year Old							
50 Year Old					Glenfiddich; 50 Year Old							
64 Year Old					1937 Rare Collection							

=== Core range ===
- Glenfiddich 12-year-old
- Glenfiddich 15-year-old
- Glenfiddich 18-year-old
- Glenfiddich 21-year-old

=== Liqueur ===
- Glenfiddich Malt Whisky Liqueur: Until 2011 Glenfiddich produced a liqueur that was 40% alcohol by volume, and sold in 50 cl (500 ml) bottles.

== Critical acclaim ==
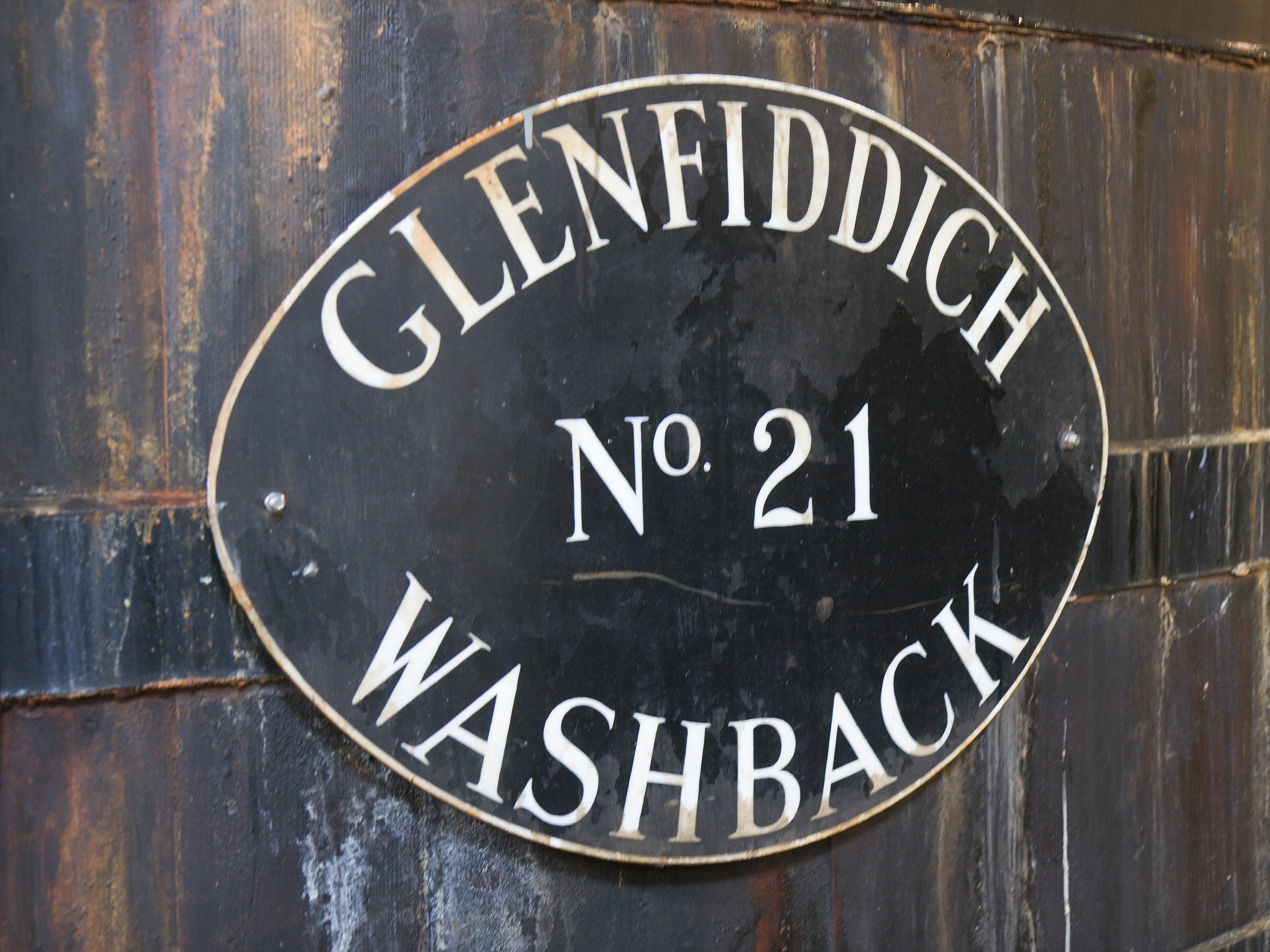
Glenfiddich's wooden washbacks

Glenfiddich's whiskies have performed well at international spirits ratings competitions. The 12, 15, 18, and 21-year offerings have all rated well in the San Francisco World Spirits Competition and the Beverage Testing Institutes' reviews. On balance, the 15-year whisky has performed the best, receiving three double-gold medals (in four years) at the 2007–2010 San Francisco competitions and a score of 91 with the Beverage Testing Institute.

== Glenfiddich Awards ==
Started in 1970, Glenfiddich promoted the Glenfiddich Food and Drink Awards to honour distinguished writing and broadcasting in the fields of food and drink in the UK. In 2008, Glenfiddich decided to discontinue distributing Food and Drink Awards, reviewing their "strategy, scope and potential application in some of Glenfiddich's key markets outside the UK."

Started in 1998, Glenfiddich promoted the Glenfiddich Spirit of Scotland Awards. The Glenfiddich Spirit of Scotland Awards were annual awards given to notable Scottish people. Glenfiddich sponsored the event, in association with The Scotsman newspaper. Nine awards were distributed for art, business, environment, food, music, screen, sport, writing and "Top Scot". A consulting panel nominated four people in each category, with the winner decided by a public vote. The "Top Scot" is an open award, with the public able to nominate anyone. The awards haven't been hosted since 2014.

== In popular culture ==
- The Glenfiddich Solera Reserve 15-year single malt scotch whisky
  Glenfiddich was the favourite whisky of fictional detective Inspector Morse, as well as his creator Colin Dexter.
- In the 2004 film Hotel Rwanda, the lead character Paul Rusesabagina, played by Don Cheadle, bribes General Augustin Bizimungu with bottles of Glenfiddich in exchange for favourable treatment by his soldiers.
- A number of Glenfiddich whiskies feature in bars on the Yakuza video game series as part of their long-running product placement deal with Suntory.

== See also ==
- List of whisky distilleries in Scotland
