= Balvenie distillery =

Scotch whisky distillery

Coordinates: 57°27′33.1″N 3°7′42.9″W

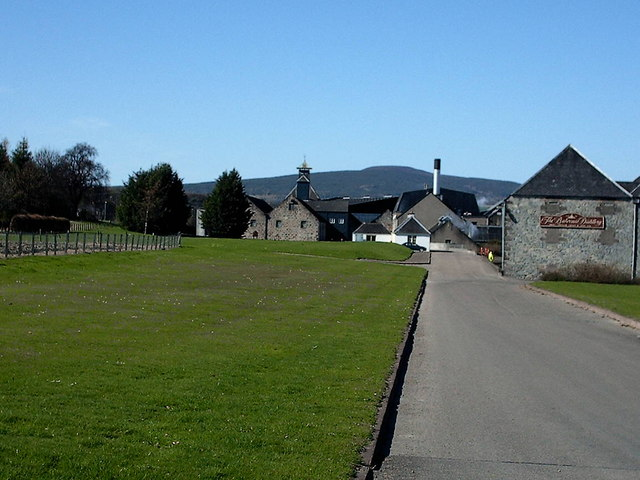

Region: Speyside
- Location: Dufftown
- Owner: William Grant & Sons
- Founded: 1892
- Status: Operational
- Water source: Robbie Dubh
- No. of stills: 5 Wash Stills; 6 Spirit Stills
- Capacity: 5,600,000 litres

The Balvenie
- Age(s): 10-year-old 12-year-old 14-year-old 15-year-old 17-year-old 18-year-old 21-year-old 25-year-old 30-year-old 40-year-old 50-year-old various vintages
- Cask type(s): Bourbon, Sherry, Port, Rum, Madeira

Balvenie distillery is a Speyside single malt Scotch whisky distillery located in Dufftown, Scotland. Is owned by William Grant & Sons.

== History ==
William Grant was born on 19 December 1839 in his father's house in Dufftown. At seven he began herding cattle at a farm on the upper reaches of the River Deveron. He was apprenticed to a shoemaker then worked as a clerk, and then became a bookkeeper at Mortlach distillery 1866. There, he was appointed as a clerk and then manager and learned the distilling trade.

After about twenty years, Grant left his job at the Mortlach distillery and bought a field near Balvenie Castle. He then drew up plans for his distillery, and the foundation stone was laid in the autumn of 1886.

Grant remained active in the company until his death in 1923 at the age of 83.

In early 1892 work began to convert an 18th-century mansion (Balvenie New House) into a distillery. The building took fifteen months to complete, and on 1 May 1893, the first distillation took place at the Balvenie Distillery.

David Stewart MBE, Balvenie's most recent former Malt Master, is one of the industry's most experienced experts and began working with William Grant & Sons in 1962. He was the first to create the process that would later be known as wood finishing, whereby whiskies are matured in one type of cask, such as ex-Bourbon barrels, then transferred into a second cask type (such as ex Sherry, Port or Rum), resulting in a greater depth and complexity of the final flavour of the whisky. He received his MBE from Queen Elizabeth II on the 5th of July, 2016, for his services to the Scotch Whisky Industry.

== In media ==
In 2007, The Balvenie's previous Global Brand Ambassador David Laird presented an online documentary series about the making of malt whisky, shot in and around the Balvenie Distillery.

== Whiskies ==
Balvenie makes whisky in the traditional batch process of the production of single malt. The use of locally grown barley is preferred, and it is floor-malted where possible. Of the 120+ distilleries in Scotland, Balvenie is one of only seven distilleries with its own malting floor, and the only distillery that still practises all 5 of the Rare Crafts all on site (growing barley, malting barley, onsite Copper Smith, onsite Cooperage, and The Balvenie Malt Master, Kelsey McKechnie).

=== Core Range ===
- DoubleWood 12 Year Old
- Caribbean Cask 14 Year Old
- French Oak 16 Year Old
- DoubleWood 17 Year Old (Discontinued)
- PortWood 21 Year Old

=== Stories Range ===
Launched in 2019, The Balvenie Stories Range is made up of whiskies based upon the stories of the craftsmen and people that work at the distillery, with many of them developing their skills at the distillery over several generations. The design of the packaging features artwork by British print artist Andy Lovell for each of the releases.

- Story 1: The Sweet Toast of American Oak
- Story 2: The Week of Peat
- Story 3: A Day of Dark Barley
- Story 4: The Creation of a Classic
- Story 5: The Second Red Rose
- Story 6: The Edge of Burnhead Wood
- Story 7: The Tale of the Dog
- Story 8: A Rare Discovery from Distant Shores
- Story 9: A Revelation of Cask and Character
- Story 10: A Collection of Curious Casks

=== Connoisseur Range ===
- Single Barrel 12 Year Old
- Single Barrel 15 Year Old
- Single Barrel 25 Year Old
- Tun 1401 (Batches 1 - 9)
- Tun 1858
- Tun 1509

=== Rare & Precious Range ===
- The Balvenie Thirty
- The Balvenie Forty
- The Balvenie Fifty
- The Balvenie 50 Year Old Single Cask

=== Travel Retail Exclusive ===
In May 2013 The Balvenie commenced selling their triple cask range. These whiskies have been matured in three distinct cask types: Oloroso sherry butts, first-fill bourbon barrels, and traditional whisky casks. These can be characterised by subtle spice and honeycomb flavours. In this range are:

- Triple Cask 12 Year Old
- Triple Cask 16 Year Old
- Triple Cask 25 Year Old
- Triple Cask 14 Year Old Peated

Also available for Travel Retail is the;

- Madeira 21 Year Old

This range is currently only available to international travellers through the duty-free section of airports.

=== Limited editions ===
- Golden Cask 12 Year Old (Travel Retail exclusive)
- Cuban Selection 14 Year Old (France)
- Islay Cask 17 Year Old (released 2001)
- NewWood 17 Year Old (released 2005)
- NewOak 17 Year Old (released 2006)
- SherryOak 17 Year Old (released 2007)
- RumCask 17 Year Old (released 2008)
- Madeira Cask 17 Year Old (released 2009)
- Peated Cask 17 Year Old (released 2010)
- Signature 12 Year Old (5 batches to date)
- Craftsman's Reserve No 1 - The Cooper 15 year old (released 2012) limited to 515 bottles
- PortWood 1989
- PortWood 1991
- PortWood 1993
- 14 Year Old Peat Week

=== Vintage casks ===
- The DCS Compendium Range of Balvenie was released, beginning in 2005. Each of the 5 Chapters contains 5 Vintage, single cask whiskies, ranging in age from the 1960s to the 21st century, as well as in cask type.

== Awards ==
Some Balvenie offerings have received awards at spirits ratings competitions. At the San Francisco World Spirits Competitions from 2006 to 2012, its 15-year single barrel received: gold, silver, gold, silver, and double gold medals. Its Portwood Cask Finish 21 year won double gold in 2012—the last year it was rated in that competition. At the 2006 International Spirits Challenge, Balvenie's collective offerings yielded the biggest gold medal haul for any brand in any one year since the competition began.

Other notable awards:

- 2013 World Whiskies Awards: The Balvenie 30 Year Old - Best Speyside single malt
- 2009 International Spirits Challenge: The Balvenie PortWood 21 Year Old - Gold
- 2009 International Wine & Spirit Competition: The Balvenie PortWood 21 Year Old - Best in Class
- 2008 International Spirits Challenge: The Balvenie Signature Aged 12 Years - Gold
- 2008 International Wine & Spirit Competition: The Balvenie PortWood 21 Year Old - Gold, The Balvenie Vintage 1974 - Gold, The Balvenie Vintage 1974 - Best in Class
- 2008 Scotch Whisky Masters: The Balvenie PortWood 21 Year Old - Gold
- 2008 San Francisco World Spirits Competition: The Balvenie Single Barrel 15 Year Old - Gold, The Balvenie SherryOak 17 Year Old - Gold
- 2008 World Whiskies Awards: The Balvenie SherryOak 17 Year Old - Speyside category winner

== See also ==
- Whisky
- Scotch whisky
- List of whisky brands
- List of distilleries in Scotland
