= World Spirits Alliance =

- Formation: 2019
- Type: Trade association
- Legal status: Non-profit association
- Purpose: To create a common platform for exchange and representative body that supports input on issues relating to global spirits industry such as trade and regulatory policy, environmental and sustainability
- Headquarters: Grand-Lancy, Switzerland
- Members: 30
- Secretary General: Marie Audren
- President: Rodolfo González
- CEO: Helen Medina
- Website: https://worldspiritsalliance.com/

The World Spirits Alliance is a global trade association

== History ==
On July 10, 2019 a number of trade organisation and companies including the Scotch Whisky Association, Pernod Richard and Diageo came together to form the World Spirts Alliance.

On April 20, 2026 Helen Medina was appointed as C.E.O of the World Spirit Alliance

== Economic ==
In 2023, the World Spirits Alliance (WSA) released a report on counterfeit alcohol, revealing that 26% of global spirits consumption is illicit. The rate is as high as 46% in countries such as India. The report also found that in 2012, the UK lost £218 million (US$270 million) due to counterfeit alcohol, according to the EU’s Intellectual Property Office. These losses increased during the COVID-19 pandemic as criminals became more sophisticated. Today, countries and producers are countering this threat by deploying various protection systems, including authentication, traceability, and security features such as smart labels and tamper-evident lids.

On July 10, 2024, Oxford Economics and IWSR Drinks Market Analysis conducted a study on behalf of the WSA titled the WSA Global Economic Impact Study. The study found that global spirits contributed $730 billion to global GDP in 2022 and supported 36 million jobs worldwide. It also showed that the sector generated $390 billion in taxes — equivalent to the tax intake of a top 20 economy — while manufacturers spent $120 billion with their suppliers, more than half of which went to agriculture.

== Members ==
=== Founding Members ===
The World Spirts Alliance has 16 founding members globally including; Spirits Europe, Asia Pacific International Wines and Spirits Alliance, Camara Nacional de la Industria Tequilera, Scotch Whisky Association, Association of Canadian Distillers, Pernod Ricard, Diageo, International Spirits and Wines Association of India, Japanese Spirits Liquor Makers Association, Brown-Forman, Distilled Spirits Council of the US, Spirits New Zealand, Rémy Cointreau, Beam Suntory, Spirits and Cocktail Australia, Campari and Edrington

=== Current Membership ===
As of 2026 the World Spirits Alliance has 30 members

No	Name	Country/Region
1.	Bacardi Limited	Bermuda
2.	Brown-Forman	United States
3.	Campari Group	Italy
4.	Diageo	United Kingdom
5.	Edrington	United Kingdom
6.	Jägermeister	Germany
7.	Moët Hennessy	France
8.	Pernod Ricard	France
9.	Rémy Cointreau	France
10.	Sazerac	United States
11.	Suntory Global Spirits	Japan
12.	William Grant & Sons	United Kingdom
13.	Asociación de Bebidas Espirituosas de Latinoamérica y el Caribe	Caribbean
14.	American Distilled Spirits Alliance	United States
15.	Associação Brasileira de Bebidas	Brazil
16.	Asia Pacific International Spirits & Wine Alliance	Asia Pacific
17.	Bureau National Interprofessionnel du Cognac	France
18.	Cámara Nacional de la Industria Tequilera	Mexico
19.	Distilled Spirits Council of the United States	United States
20	Drinks Ireland	Ireland
21.	The Foreign Spirits Producers Association Limited	Hong Kong
22.	Brazilian Institute of Cachaça	Brazil
23.	International Spirits & Wines Association of India	India
24	Japan Spirits & Liqueurs Makers Association	Japan
25.	Korean Liquor Industry Association	South Korea
26.	South African Liquor Brandowners Association	South Africa
27.	Spirits & Cocktails Australia	Australia
28.	Spirits Canada	Canada
29.	Spirits Europe	Europe
30..	Spirits New Zealand	New Zealand

== See also ==
New world whisky

Wine and Spirit Trade Association

Alliance Against Counterfeit Spirits
