= Alliance Against Counterfeit Spirits =

Liqueur industry association

Alliance Against Counterfeit Spirits Ltd
- Abbreviation: AACS
- Formation: 1993; 33 years ago
- Type: Trade association
- Legal status: Private company
- Purpose: Counterfeit protection of international production of spirits
- Headquarters: Holborn Viaduct, London, United Kingdom
- Region served: Worldwide
- Members: Spirits producers
- Website: www.aacs-global.com

The Alliance Against Counterfeit Spirits (AACS) is an anti-counterfeiting alliance that represents the world’s major international spirits-producing companies. AACS has been in operation since 1993 with the single purpose of combating the counterfeiting of distilled spirits brands.

The actions of counterfeiters can pose a direct health risk to consumers, erode legitimate tax revenues, and undermine consumer trust in well-established brands. The AACS is active in more than 20 countries and works with the brands of some of the largest spirits businesses in the world.

== History ==
Spirits are alcoholic drinks that include distilled alcohol, such as gin, liqueurs, vodka, rum, whisky, and brandy. They are high-value products and therefore attractive to counterfeiters. Counterfeit products are sold by subterfuge by, for example, re-filling branded spirits bottles or adding dangerous ingredients which could cause problems like methanol poisoning.

== Partners ==
AACS partners own over two-thirds of the internationally-recognised spirits brands sold around the world. Partner companies produce around 300 million cases of spirits per year – around a third of the worldwide total. As of 2020, there were 9 AACS partners:

- Pernod Ricard
- Brown-Forman
- Diageo
- Bacardi
- William Grant & Sons
- Tito's Vodka
- Finlandia Vodka
- Rémy Cointreau
- Suntory Global Spirits

== See also ==
- European Spirits Organisation
