= Botanist (disambiguation) =

A botanist is a scientist specialized in botany.

It may also mean:

- Botanist (liquor)
- Botanist (band)
