= Lomond still =

Whisky still

A Lomond still is a type of still that was sometimes used for whisky distillation, invented in 1955 by Alistair Cunningham of Hiram Walker. It is used for batch distillation like a pot still, but has three perforated plates which can be cooled independently, controlling the reflux through the apparatus in a manner similar to coffey stills. This allows the distiller to produce different kinds of whisky in the same still. Lomond stills, despite their name, have never been used at the Loch Lomond distillery only at the Hiram Walker Glenburgie, Miltonduff, Inverleven and Scapa distilleries. (Loch Lomond uses a straight necked pot still design). For a time, the only remaining Lomond still was in the Scapa distillery, where it is used as a wash still, in combination with a traditional pot still. In 2010, Bruichladdich distillery installed the original still salvaged from the demolished Inverleven distillery as a gin still. In 2015 new Lomond stills were installed at InchDairnie distillery. Loch Lomond Distillery has Lomond Stills installed, though it is unknown how long they have been there.
