= Allied Domecq =

1994–2005 British alcoholic beverages manufacturer

Allied Domecq PLC
- Industry: Drink industry
- Founded: 1994
- Defunct: 2005
- Fate: Acquired
- Successor: Pernod Ricard
- Headquarters: Bristol, United Kingdom

Allied Domecq PLC was a multinational company, headquartered in Bristol, United Kingdom, that operated spirits, wine, and quick service restaurant businesses.

It was once a FTSE 100 Index constituent and the world's second-largest spirits group but has been acquired by Pernod Ricard.

== History ==
Allied Domecq was the result of a 1994 merger between Allied Lyons and Pedro Domecq S.A. Allied Lyons itself was the result of a 1978 merger between Allied Breweries and the food and catering group J. Lyons and Co. In 1999 the 3,500 strong pub division was sold to Burton-based Punch Taverns for £3bn after a bidding war with Whitbread.

In early 2005, a takeover bid for the company was launched by French-based rival Pernod Ricard S.A. Pernod Ricard successfully completed acquisition on 26 July 2005 and sold off the overlapping spirits brands to U.S.-based competitor Fortune Brands and British-based multinational Diageo. On 12 December 2005, Pernod Ricard announced that it had agreed to sell the restaurant businesses (Dunkin' Brands) to a consortium of three US private equity firms (Thomas H. Lee Partners, the Carlyle Group and Bain Capital LLP) for $2.43 billion. The closing of the sale occurred on 1 March 2006.

== Distilleries ==
Many malt distilleries were operated by Allied Domecq and former company Allied Lyons. Some are still open under new owners:

Distillery	Founded	Owners
Balblair	1790	Inver House Distillers
Glenburgie	1810	Chivas Brothers
Glencadam	1825	Angus Dundee Distiller
Glenugie	1831	Closed 1983, Demolished
Inverleven	1938	Closed 1991, Demolished
Kinclaith	1957	Closed 1975, Demolished
Laphroaig	1815	Suntory Global Spirits
Lochside	1957	Closed 1992: Demolished
Miltonduff	1824	Chivas Brothers
Scapa	1885	Chivas Brothers
Tormore	1958	Elixir Distillers

== Brands ==
Allied Domecq's operated a combination of nine core global brands, plus a selection of local market leaders.

- Scotch whisky:
  - Single malt Scotch whisky: Balblair, Glenburgie, Glencadam, Laphroaig, Miltonduff, Scapa, Tormore
  - Blended Scotch whisky: Ballantine's, Teacher's Highland Cream
- American whiskey: Maker's Mark,
- Canadian whisky: Canadian Club
- Spanish whisky: DYC whisky
- Brandy & Cognac: Courvoisier, Centenario, Don Pedro, Fundador
- Gin: Larios
- Liqueurs & Bitters: Kahlúa, Kuemmerling, Tia Maria
- Port:Cockburn's Port
- Rum: Malibu
- Sherry: Harvey's Bristol Cream
- Tequilal: Sauza Tequila
- Vodka: Stolichnaya vodka
- Wine: Montana Wines, Clos du Bois
- Champagne: G. H. Mumm, Perrier-Jouët
