= Inverleven distillery =

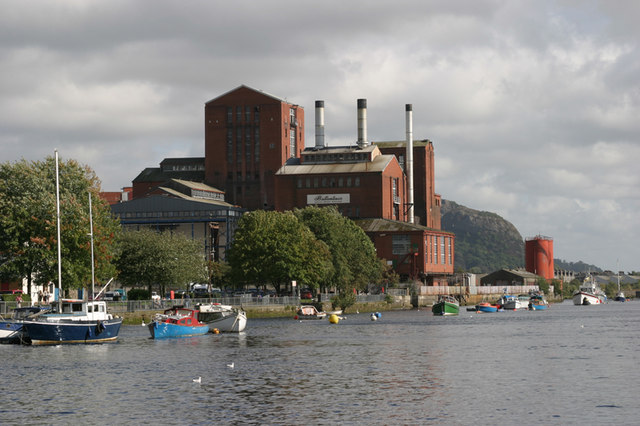
- Location: Dumbarton, Scotland
- Owner: Chivas Brothers
- Founded: 1938
- Status: Closed/demolished
- Water source: Loch Lomond

Inverleven distillery was a Lowland single malt Scotch whisky distillery in Dumbarton, Scotland.

== History ==
Inverleven Single malt Scotch distillery was built in 1938 as part of the larger Dumbarton complex (including a large grain distillery) by Hiram Walker & Sons with the intention of providing spirit to be used for their Ballantine's blend.

Hiram Walker sold the distillery to Allied Distillers. Pernod Ricard acquired Allied Domecq in 2005 and added it to his Chivas Brothers subsidiary.

Inverleven was closed in 1991.

In 2005, Bruichladdich distillery at Port Charlotte in Islay bought Inverleven stills to be used there.

Inverleven distillery was demolished in 2006.
