= Louis XIII (cognac) =

Type of cognac made by Rémy Martin

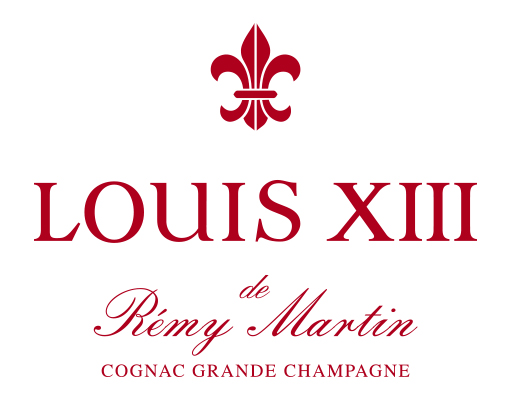

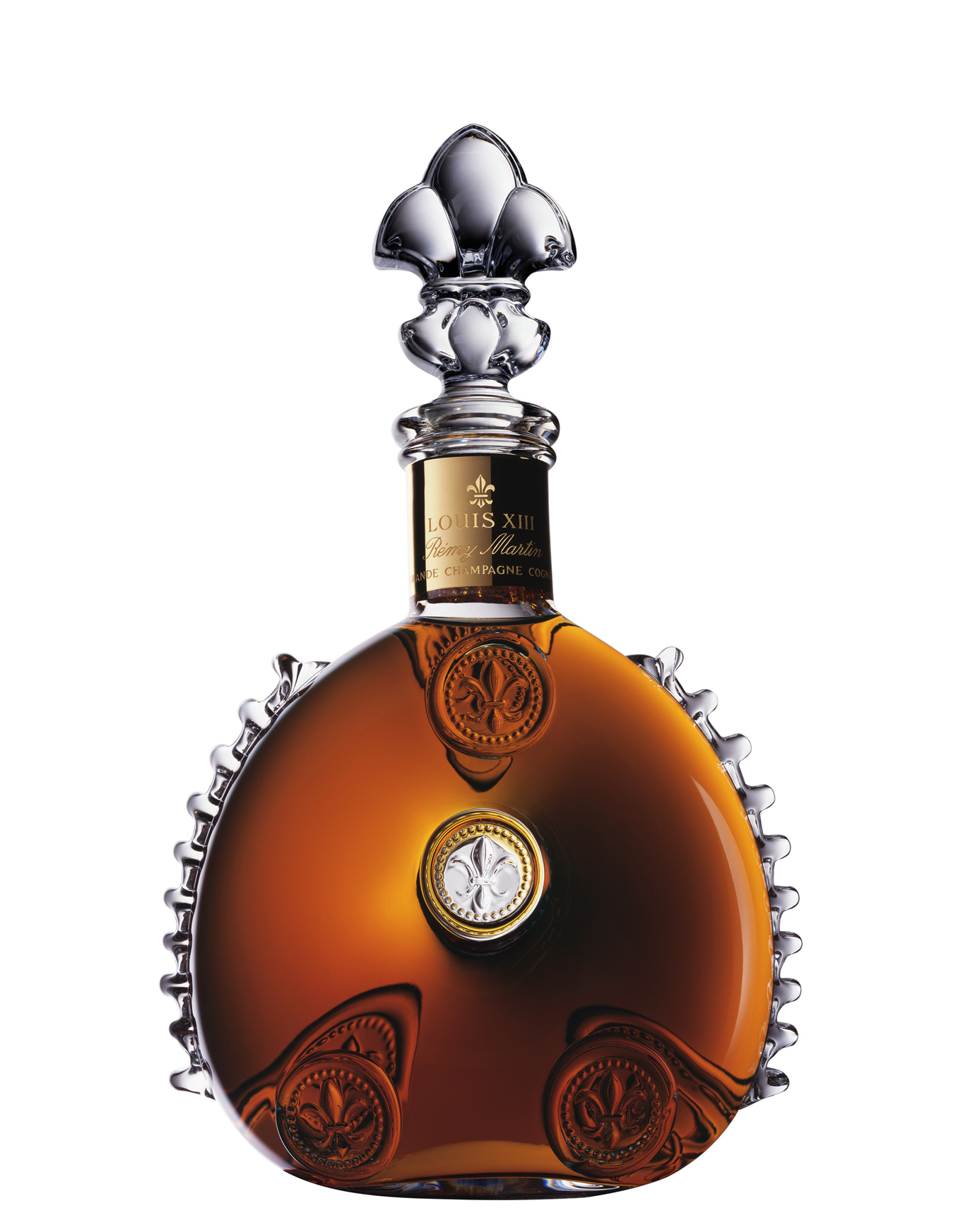
- Type: Cognac
- Manufacturer: Rémy Martin
- Distributor: Rémy Cointreau
- Origin: France, Grande Champagne
- Alcohol by volume: 40%
- Website: louisxiii-cognac.com

Louis XIII (French pronunciation: [lwi tʁɛz]) is a cognac produced by Rémy Martin, a company headquartered in Cognac, France, and owned by the Rémy Cointreau Group. The name was chosen as a tribute to the French King Louis XIII, the reigning monarch when the Rémy Martin family settled in the Cognac region. He was the first monarch to recognize cognac as a category in its own right in the world of eaux-de-vie.

Louis XIII cognac is produced in the Grande Champagne region of Cognac, from the growing of the grapes to the distillation and aging of the eaux-de-vie. The final blend is composed of up to 1,200 individual eaux-de-vie from Grande Champagne vineyards, ranging from at least 40 years to 100 years in age.

== History ==
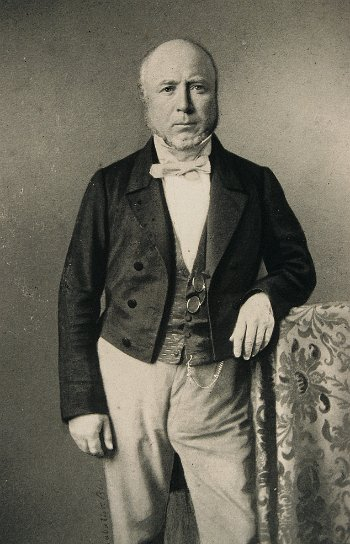
Paul-Emile Rémy Martin

The origins of Louis XIII cognac begin with the founding of the House in the Cognac region in the early 1700s. In 1841, after more than a century of producing cognac, Paul-Emile Rémy Martin assumed control of the business and began selling the House’s cognacs under the family name.

Paul-Emile broke from tradition and began bottling his cognacs rather than continuing to sell them by the barrel. In 1874, he began selling a blend of his best 100% Grande Champagne cognacs in an ornate decanter. While originally designated "Grande Champagne Very Old – Age Unknown", this particular blend and its decanter later became known as Louis XIII.

== Production ==
The eaux-de-vie for Louis XIII are still exclusively sourced from the Grande Champagne cru of Cognac. This region in Cognac is distinguished for its limestone composition that is considered ideal for the grapes employed in the production of cognac. The ageing process takes place exclusively inside 100- to 150-year-old tierçons, thin-walled French oak casks originally designed for maritime transport that are no longer being produced.

Since 1874, each generation of cellar master has selected the oldest and best eaux-de-vie for Louis XIII from the House’s cellars. As the cellar master may never taste the final blend for which some of these eaux-de-vie are intended, each cellar master must also carefully train a successor. The House's current cellar master, Baptiste Loiseau, joined as an apprentice to the previous cellar master, and then assumed the position of cellar master in 2014 at the age of 34.

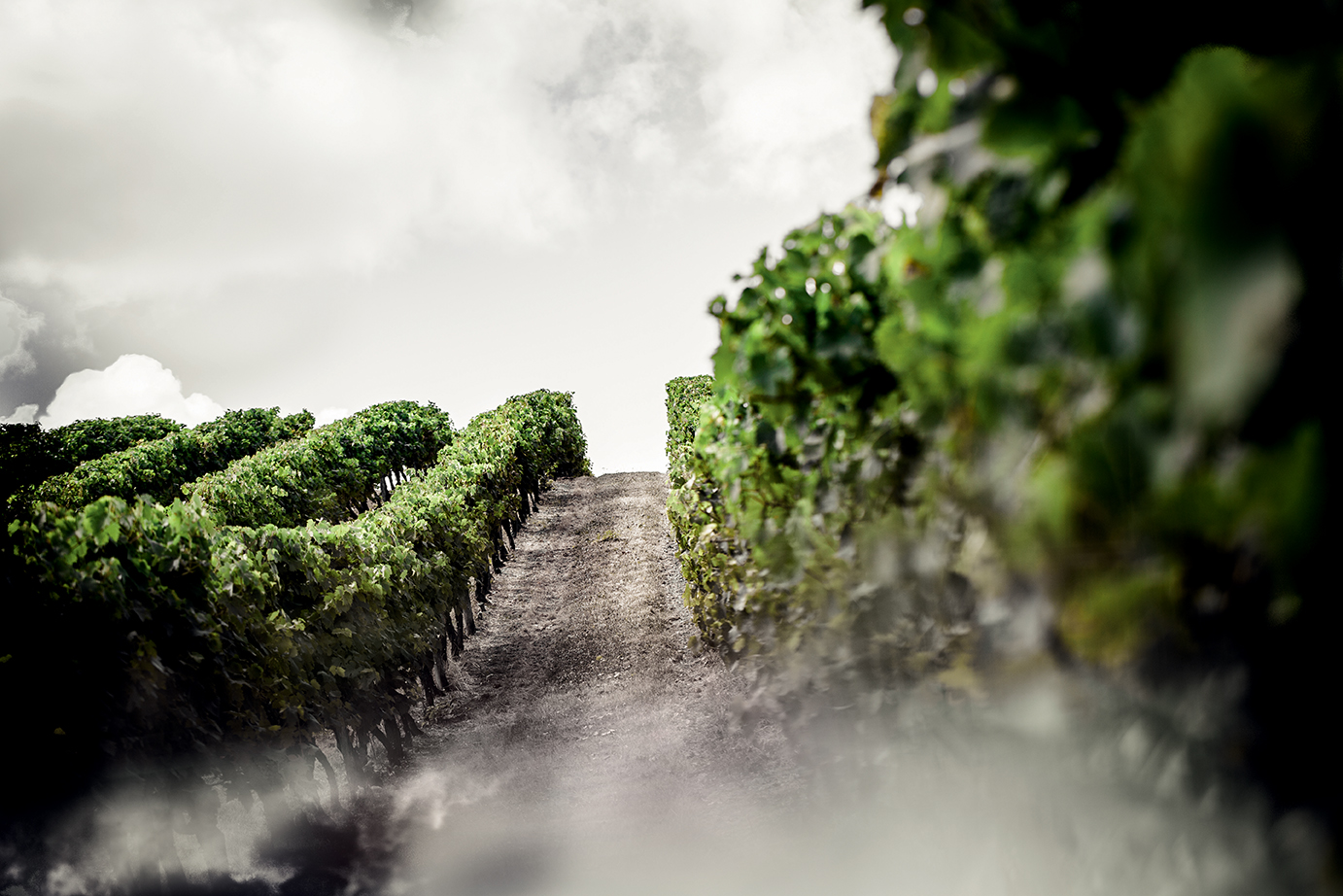
Field of grapes in Grande Champagne for Louis XIII production

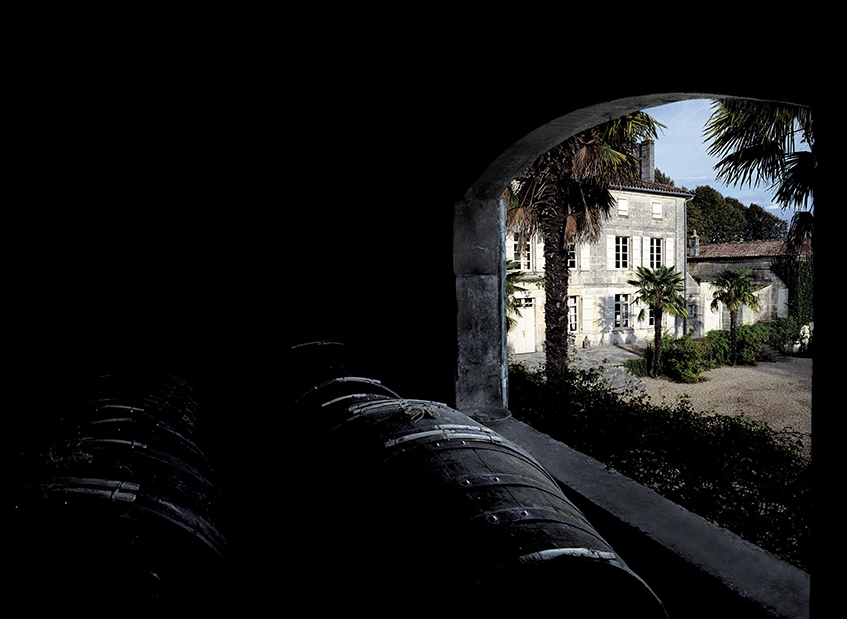
Domaine du Grollet

== Packaging ==
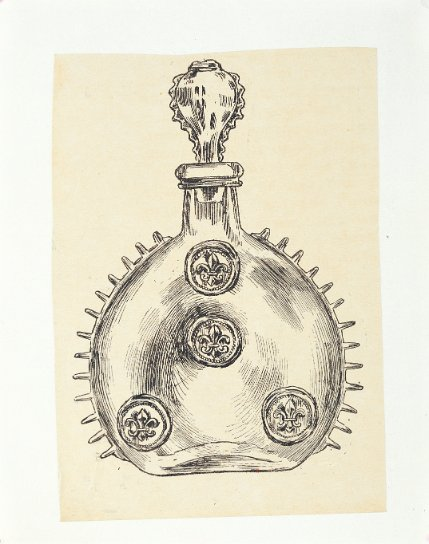
Drawing of Louis XIII decanter based on a metal flask originally recovered from the site of the Battle of Jarnac (1569)

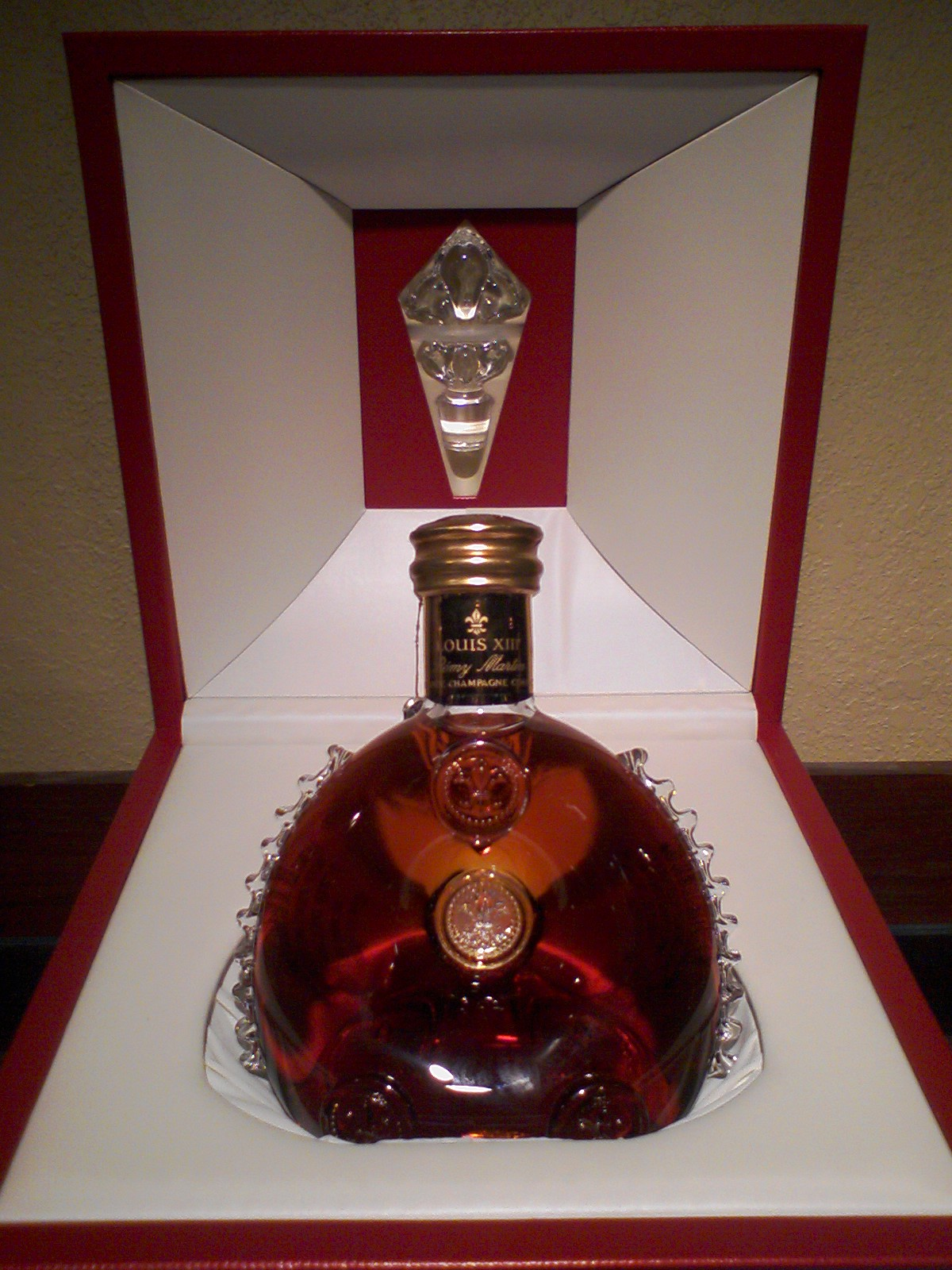
A decanter of Louis XIII in its presentation box

=== Decanter ===
The concept for the decanter of Louis XIII originated in 1850, when Paul-Emile Rémy Martin came across a metal flask originally recovered from the site of the Battle of Jarnac (1569). He purchased the metal flask and registered the rights for its reproduction. In 1874, in honour of the House’s 150th anniversary, he designed a glass replica of the flask to use as the vessel for his best cognac. Today, each crystal decanter is handmade by French crystal manufacturers: Baccarat, Saint-Louis, and Cristallerie de Sèvres.

Louis XIII is bottled in several sizes: Classic (700 mL or 750 mL [USA]), Magnum (1.5 L or 1.75 L [USA]), Miniature (50 mL), Jeroboam (3 L), and Mathusalem (6 L) formats.

=== Collectors editions ===
==== Rare Cask 42.6 ====
Rare Cask 42.6 is distinguished by its alcohol content at 42.6% ABV rather than the expected 40%.

==== Rare Cask 43.8 ====
Rare Cask 43.8 was produced from a single cask with a higher alcohol content (43.8% ABV) than the other Louis XIII cognacs.

==== Black Pearl ====
Black Pearl was created as an homage to the origins of Louis XIII. The colour of the crystal was inspired by the original metal flask found at the site of the battle of Jarnac.

==== Black Pearl Anniversary Edition ====
Black Pearl Anniversary Edition was created to celebrate the 140th anniversary of the brand.

==== L’Odyssée d’un Roi ====
L’Odyssée d’un Roi was released as a collaboration with three French luxury houses, Hermès, Puiforcat, and Saint-Louis. Hermès created a bespoke leather trunk, Puiforcat forged a white gold serving pipette, and Saint-Louis hand-blew and engraved a unique version of the decanter with a map of Louis XIII’s journey around the world. Only three were made, and were auctioned by Sotheby’s in New York, Hong Kong, and London, with the proceeds benefitting The Film Foundation’s preservation efforts.

==== Time Collection – The Origin – 1874 ====
The Origin is named in tribute to the original decanter created in 1874.

==== The Legacy ====
The Legacy is a direct collaboration between four generations of cellar masters. Offered in Magnum format, each is individually signed by the four cellar masters.

== Media projects ==
=== 100 Years – The Movie You Will Never See ===
In November 2015, Louis XIII partnered with actor John Malkovich and director Robert Rodriguez to create a film entitled 100 Years – The Movie You Will Never See, which will not be released until the year 2115, mirroring the 100 years it takes to create the final blend of Louis XIII cognac. The film highlights the uncertainty of the future and the variables that contribute to a single decanter of Louis XIII. The film is housed in a safe designed by Fichet-Bauche, kept at the Cellars of Louis XIII in Cognac, France, set to automatically open on 18 November 2115.

=== "100 Years – The Song We'll Only Hear If We Care" ===
In November 2017, Louis XIII partnered with Pharrell Williams to create "100 Years – The Song We'll Only Hear If We Care" to be released in 2117. The song is a collaborative effort intended to draw attention to environmental issues and the unpredictability of the future. Pharrell’s track was recorded on a disc made out of clay from the chalky soil of Cognac, France, and played once for an audience of 100 in Shanghai, China. The disc was then locked in a specially designed Fichet-Bauche safe that protects it against everything except water from potential rising tides, which would dissolve the clay disc.
