= Metaxa =

Spirit from Greece

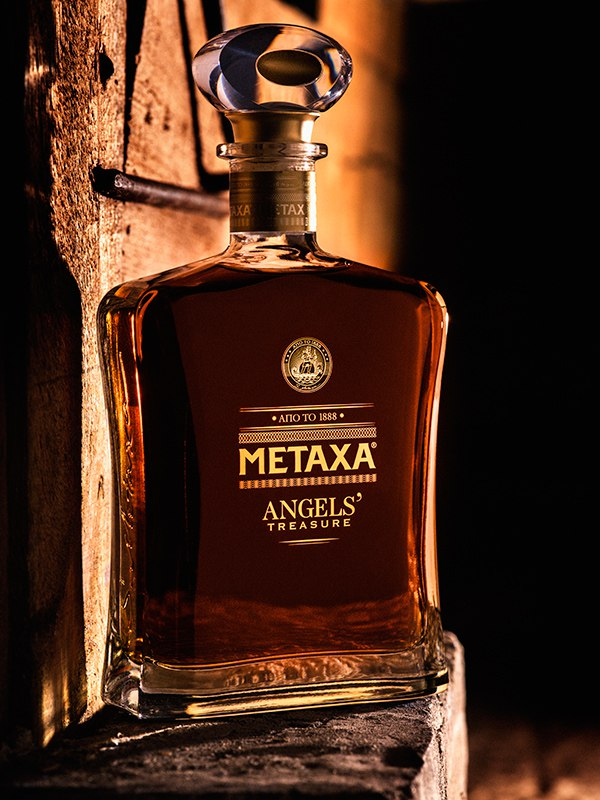
- Type: Liquor
- Origin: Greece
- Introduced: 1888
- Variants: Metaxa 5 stars, Metaxa 7 stars, Metaxa 12 stars, Metaxa Grande Fine, Metaxa Angels Treasure, Metaxa Private Reserve, Metaxa AEN
- Website: www.metaxa.com

Metaxa (Greek: Μεταξά) is a line of branded Greek alcoholic drinks, each a flavored amber blend of spirits and Muscat wine, aged in oak barrels. Several Metaxa products have numbered "star" designations indicating, according to different sources, either the product's age, the number of base spirits and wines used in making it, or simply the quality level (itself a reflection of the age). Metaxa's main exported products are 5 Star, 7 Star, 12 Star, and Private Reserve. (Metaxa 3 Star is not exported.)

Created in 1888 and labeled first as a cognac and then as a brandy until prohibited by naming regulations, the maker remained in private hands until sold in 1989 to Grand Metropolitan, which in turn sold it in 2000 to Rémy Cointreau.

== History ==
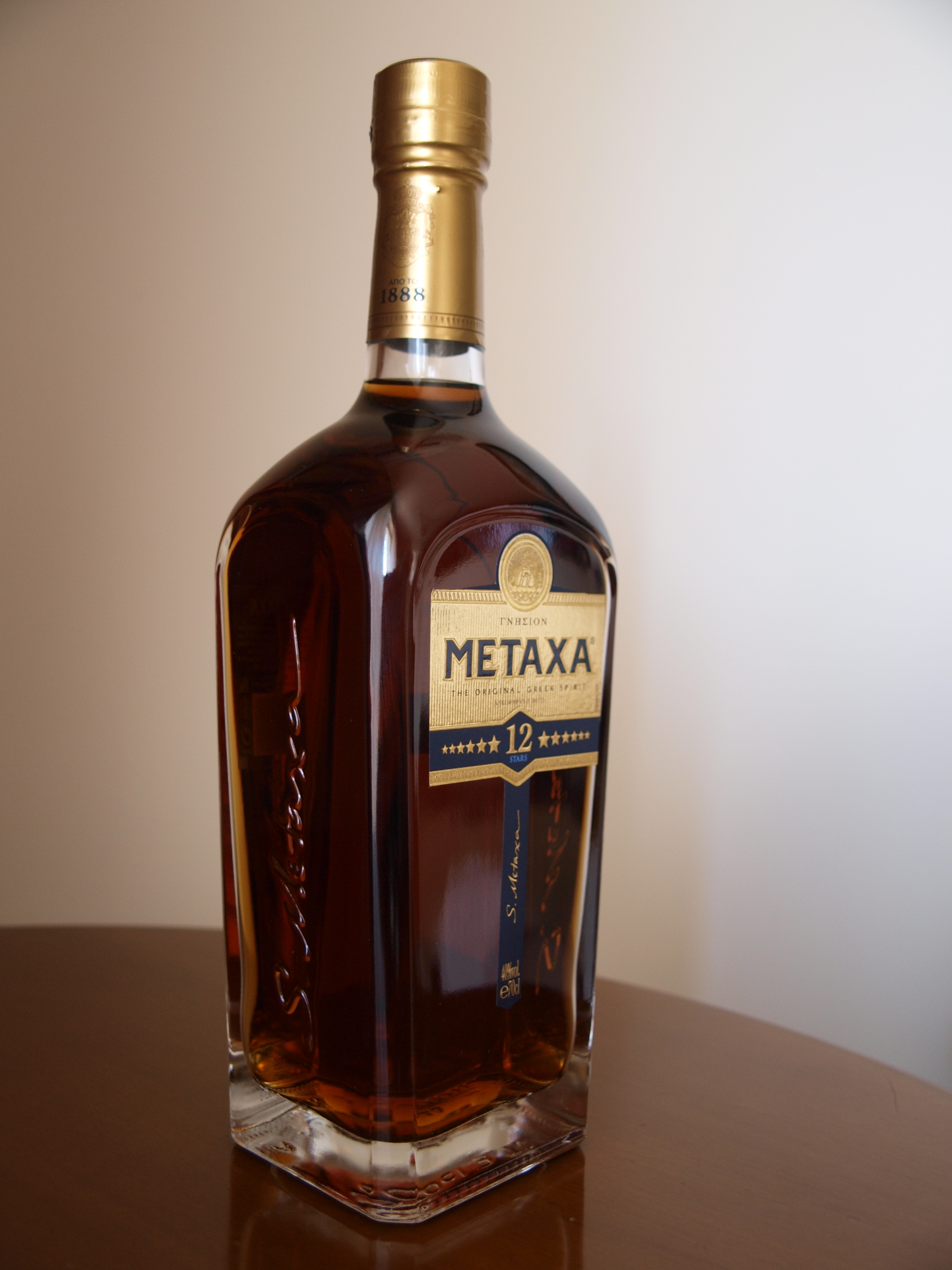

The company's founder, Spyros Metaxa, was born in 1848 into a family of Greek silk merchants. Exposed during his travels to spirits and wines from around the world, he created Metaxa in 1888, when he owned a tavern. The "Salamina Warrior", the Metaxa emblem, is inspired by an ancient medallion that Spyros Metaxa found when building his distillery in Piraeus in 1888. In 1968, the distillery and the Metaxa cellars were relocated to new facilities in Athens's northern suburb of Kifissia.

== Production ==
On Samos, an island in the eastern Aegean Sea, grapes—primarily Muscat—are cultivated on terraces and hand-picked. Metaxa uses sweet Muscat wines sourced from the island, which are aged for several years and are therefore somewhat oxidized. The maker used to buy wine from independent vintners but has begun making its own, from fruit grown in its own vineyards. Its base brandies come mostly (80%) from Spain and Italy, and the rest from Greece, where they are distilled from sun-dried grapes. These ingredients are aged separately and then combined in Limousin oak casks. Mediterranean botanicals are added during the finishing process, including May rose, also a component of Chanel No. 5 perfume. The result is aged for at least two years, and in some cases for decades.

The company's master distiller or master blender as of 2025, Konstantinos Kalpaxidis, is the sixth since 1888.
