= Mount Gay Rum =

Brand of rum

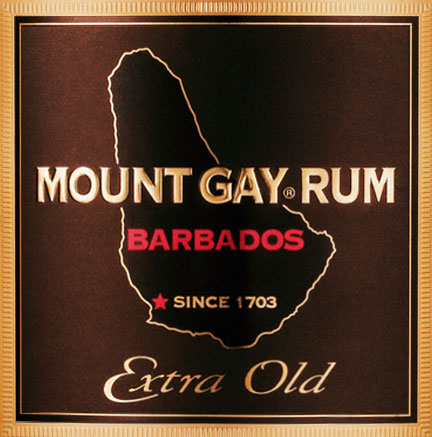
- Mount Gay Rum logo Mount Gay bottle label
- Type: Rum
- Manufacturer: Mount Gay Distilleries Ltd.
- Origin: Barbados
- Introduced: 1890
- Website: Official website

Mount Gay Rum is produced by Mount Gay Distilleries Ltd. of Barbados, the easternmost island of the West Indies. The oldest surviving deed for the company is from 1703, making Mount Gay Rum the world's oldest commercial rum distillery. The current majority shareholder of Mount Gay Distilleries since 1989 is Rémy Cointreau. Mount Gay Rum is sold in 110 countries, and its primary export market is the United States of America.

== History ==
Mount Gay Rum is named for Sir John Gay Alleyne, 1st Baronet of Four Hills. He was a trusted friend of John Sober, who purchased the Mount Gilboa Plantation/Distilleries from William Sandiford in 1747. Sir John Gay Alleyne agreed to become the manager of the company at John Sober's request. He was so effective at leading the company that the company was renamed in his honour after his death in 1801 at the proposal of his longtime friend John Sober, whose estate benefited greatly over the years under Sir John Gay Alleyne's management. As there was already a Mount Alleyne in existence on the island of Barbados, the company was renamed Mount Gay Distilleries, incorporating the beloved Sir John Gay Alleyne's middle name.

In 1757, Sir John Gay Alleyne was elected to the Parliament of Barbados, for the Parish of St. Andrew, a seat he held for the next forty years, with only a break in 1771. He became Speaker of the Barbados House of Assembly in 1767, serving until 1770 and after another two years was reappointed until 1779. Alleyne was named a Baron of Four Hills on 6 April 1769. According to Hilary Beckles, historian and principal of the University of the West Indies – Cave Hill Campus, Sir John Gay Alleyne was a popular leader among the planter elite and a great philanthropist. He was also one of the most influential voices of his time to speak out against the institution of slavery. On 29 April 2010, while speaking at the Founder's Day service at Alleyne School, which was founded by Sir John Gay, alumnus and guest speaker Monsignor Vincent Blackett stated that Sir John Gay Alleyne should certainly be named one of Barbados' National Heroes.

The company throughout the 20th century was in the hands of the Ward family in the parish of St. Peter. The Ward family resides in the northernmost parish of St. Lucy, where they have extensive agricultural holdings. The last Ward family member to manage the distillery was Frank Ward, who also the Executive Chairman of the West Indies Rum and Spirits Producers Association.

== Description ==
Mount Gay Rum is made from molasses and water that has been filtered through the natural coral of the well's source aquifer. This mix is fermented using an exclusively selected yeast and then distilled in both copper pot stills and column stills, before being aged in oak barrels.

The little red star on the image of the island on Mount Gay Rum's former bottle label represents the capital of Barbados, Bridgetown, not the location of the distilleries, which are actually in the northern part of the island. In the Bridgetown area, Mount Gay maintains the Mount Gay Rum Visitors Centre on the Spring Garden Highway in Brandons, St. Michael. The Mount Gay Visitor Center is a tourist attraction that hosts several tours and events.

The distillery is made of four warehouses where about 4,000 barrels of spirit mature. The distillation engineering includes a retort to re-infuse aromas from the vapor back into the liquid.

== Sailing traditions ==
Mount Gay Distilleries has released several limited edition rums over the course of their history to honor their nautical heritage or commemorate important occasions in the history of Barbados.

Mount Gay Rum has been closely associated with sailing and a popular rum preference among sailors over the many years of its existence. Barbados, the most deeply British of the West Indian cultures, is often the first landfall for ships following the prevailing trade winds from Europe to the Caribbean. Despite Mount Gay being favoured by sailors worldwide, the island of Barbados is not considered to be an ideal cruising area for sailing yachts due to its open exposure to the frequent swells of both the northern and equatorial Atlantic, and the lack of generally calmer seas or the true natural harbors one finds throughout the rest of the Antilles to the west (i.e. Antigua's English Harbour, or St. Georges in Grenada).

The distributors of Mount Gay rum are sponsors of the nonprofit United States Sailing Association. They also sponsor over 110 regatta events worldwide, with approximately 50 of those based in the United States, including Cowes Week. Mount Gay gives away distinctive red hats to top competitors at its sponsored regattas.

== Products ==
- Mount Gay Silver: A clear rum made from a blend of pot still and column distilled rums.
- Mount Gay Eclipse: An aged rum developed in 1911 and named for the total solar eclipse and the passage of Halley's comet in 1910.
- Mount Gay Black Barrel: An aged rum that undergoes a second maturation in deeply charred Bourbon oak barrels.
- Mount Gay XO: Formally Mount Gay Extra Old, this rum contains selected casks that have aged for 8 to 15 years.

== Cocktails ==
Mount Gay is one of the key ingredients in Stirling Punch, a drink named for famous yachtsman, America's Cup winner and Vanderbilt Sailing Club founder Harold Stirling Vanderbilt. Mount Gay Rum is also commonly used in cocktails that call for Barbadian Rum because of its wide availability.

== Perceptions ==
Mount Gay Eclipse rum has a very distinctive flavour. There are other rums made on the island, but Mount Gay is the oldest and most prominent.

Notable Spirit ratings for Mount Gay rums include scores of 95 ("Exceptional") for its Extra Old offering at the Beverage Tasting Institute's 2008 Competition and a Gold rating for Eclipse Gold at the 2009 San Francisco World Spirits Competition.

The first drink James Bond (Daniel Craig) orders in Casino Royale (2006) is not his trademark Vodka martini but a Mount Gay Rum with soda.

== Gallery ==
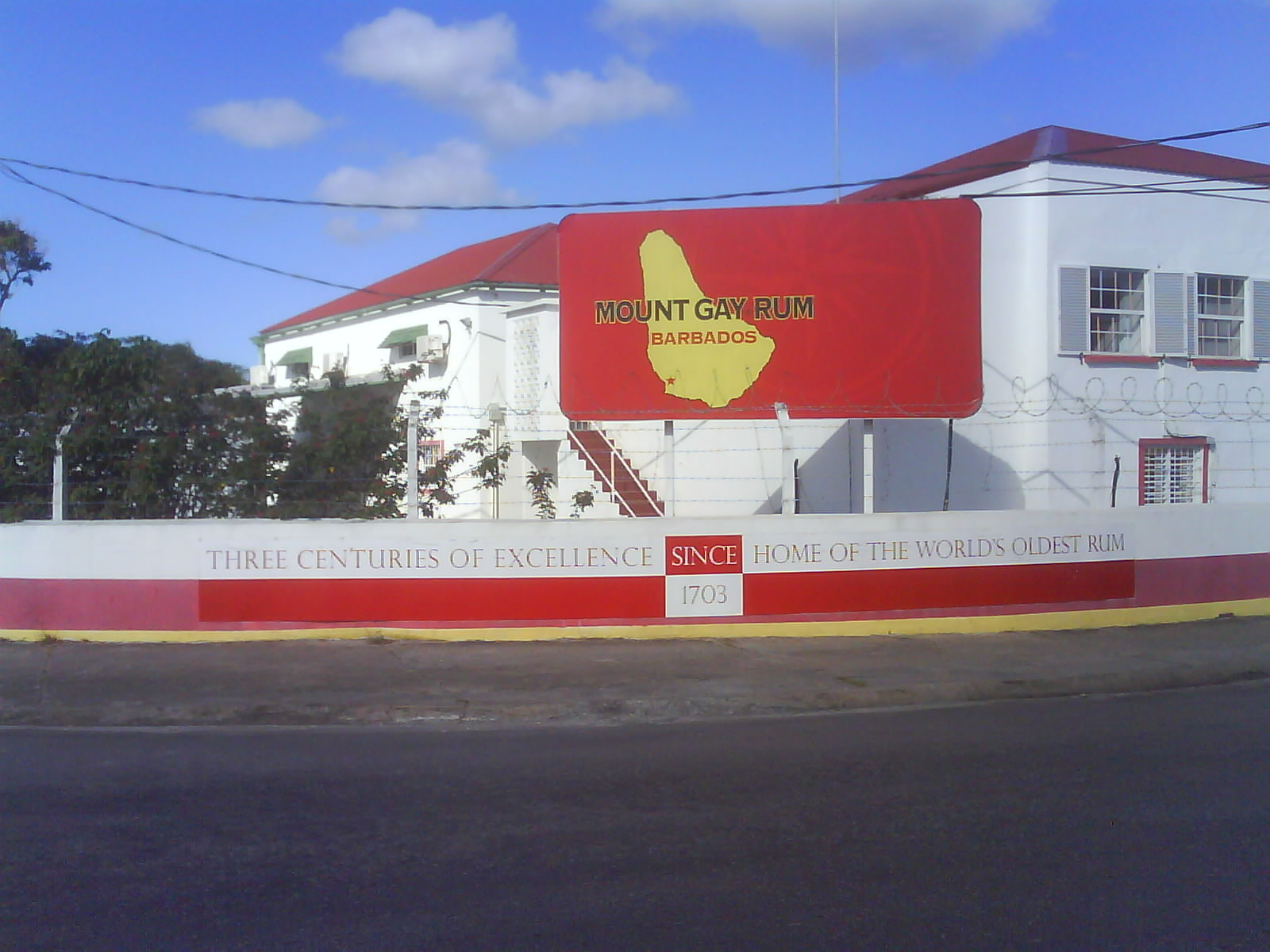
Visitors Centre in Parish of St. Michael.

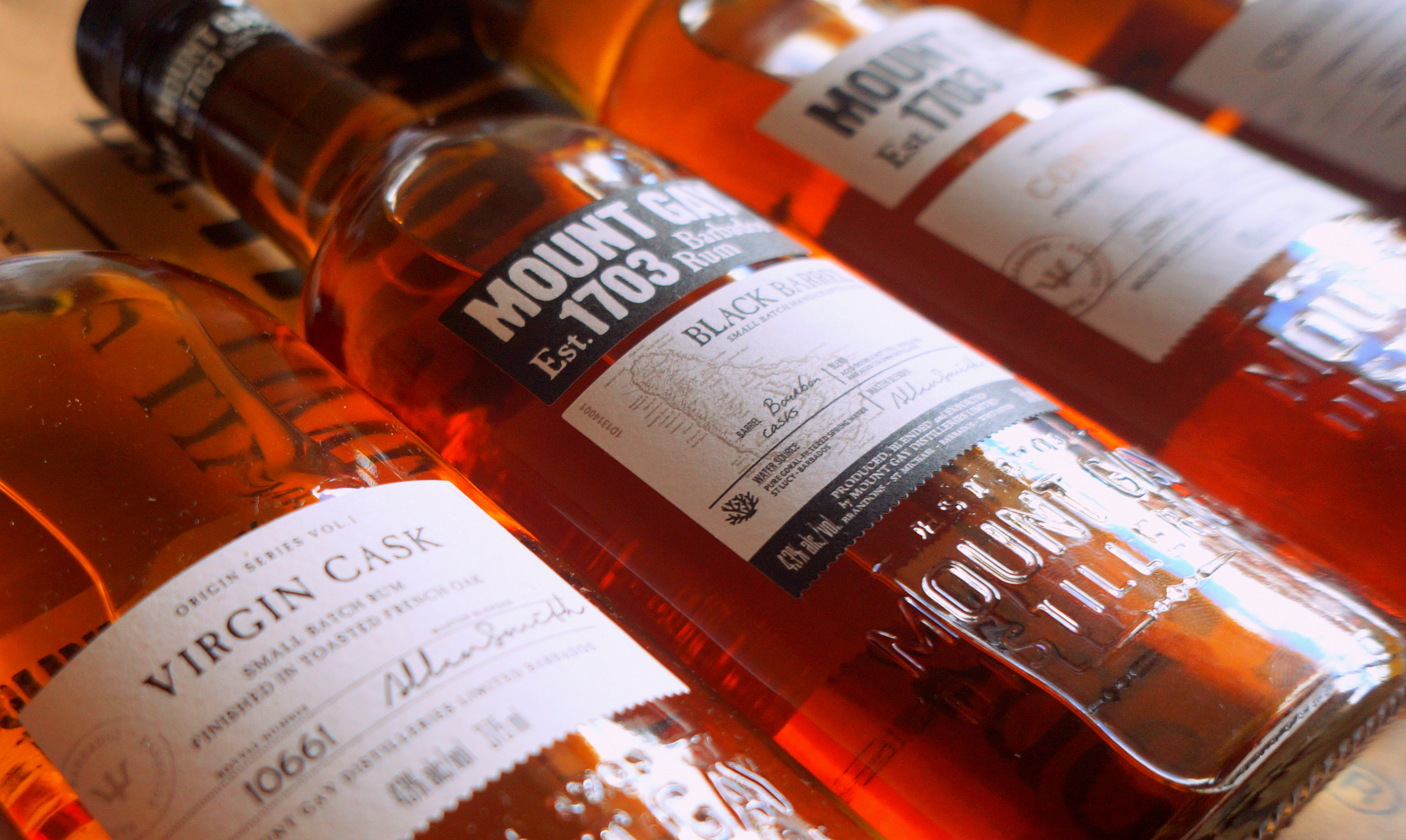
Mount Gay bottles.

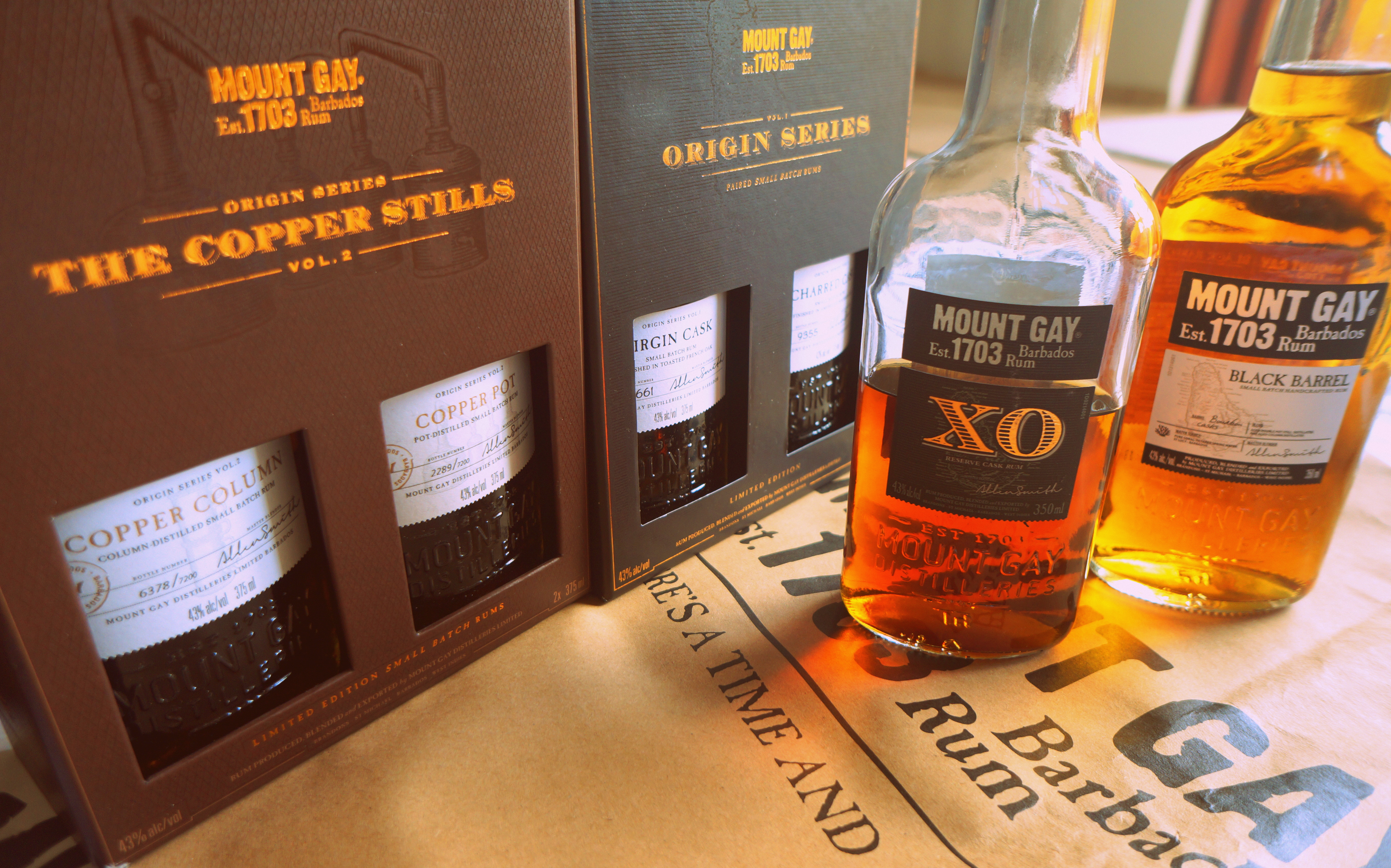
Mount Gay Products.

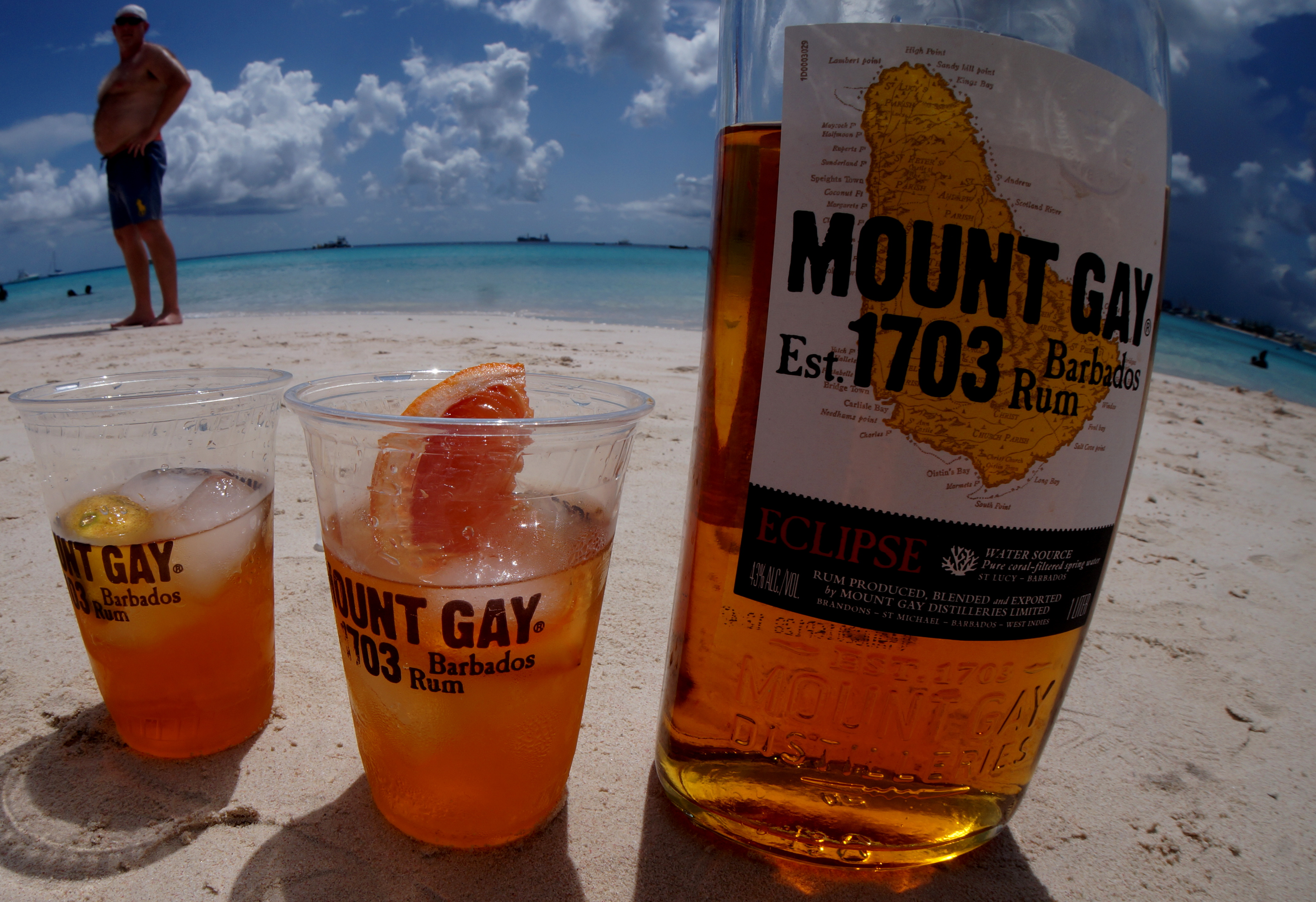
Mount Gay Rum cocktails.
