= Glenburgie distillery =

Whisky distillery in Moray, Scotland

Coordinates: 57.62179°N 3.51675°W

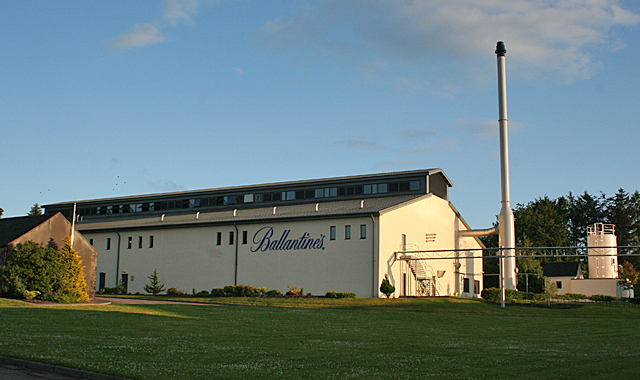
- The building of the 2004-renovated Glenburgie distillery

Region: Speyside
- Location: Alves, Moray, Scotland
- Owner: Chivas Brothers (Pernod Ricard)
- Founded: 1810
- Status: Operational
- No. of stills: 3 wash (11,750 L), 3 spirit (15,000 L)
- Capacity: 4,200,000 litres of pure alcohol per year
- Mothballed: 1870 to 1878, 1927 to 1935, 2000 - 2004

Glenburgie distillery, (also known as Glenburgie-Glenlivet, Glen Burgie or Glenburry) is Speyside single malt Scotch whisky distillery located near Alves, Moray, Scotland.

== History ==
There are mentions of a distillery being founded as early as 1810, then known as Kilnflat. It wasn't until 1829 that official records for the distillery show up. After running into financial difficulty, the distillery closed in 1870 before being renamed Glenburgie in 1871. It re-opened in 1878, under Charles Kay. There were ownership changes and around 1880 it came into the possession of Alex Fraser and Company. It was then incorporated in 1895. This situation lasted 30 years; it was liquidated in 1925, and then was closed again between 1927 and 1935.

Around that time the distillery was run by Margaret Nichol, considered the first female manager of any whisky distillery. The distillery was sold to Hiram Walker in 1936.

In a new rejuvenation in 1958, two Lomond stills were installed, alongside the existing stills. The whisky distilled in these stills was kept separate from the rest of the whisky produced by the distillery, and sold under the name Glencraig. Production continued up until 1981 when the experiment with Lomond stills was abandoned, and the stills were replaced with regular stills. In 1987, Allied Lyons buys Hiram Walker.

In 2000, production stopped entirely at Glenburgie. The distillery was completely rebuilt in 2003-2004, only retaining the stills from the old distillery.

In 2005, Pernod Ricard acquired Allied Domecq, owners of Glenburgie distillery, adding it to the company Chivas Brothers subsidiary . Soon after, in 2006 another two stills were added, bringing the total production capacity to 4,200,000 litres of pure alcohol per year.

== Location ==
The distillery is located on an estate at the Mill Buie hills near Kinloss.

== Production ==
Most of the whisky distilled at Glenburgie is used for blends, most importantly Ballantine's, but also Old Smuggler.
