= Scapa distillery =

Scotch whisky distillery

Coordinates: 58°57′49″N 2°59′6″W

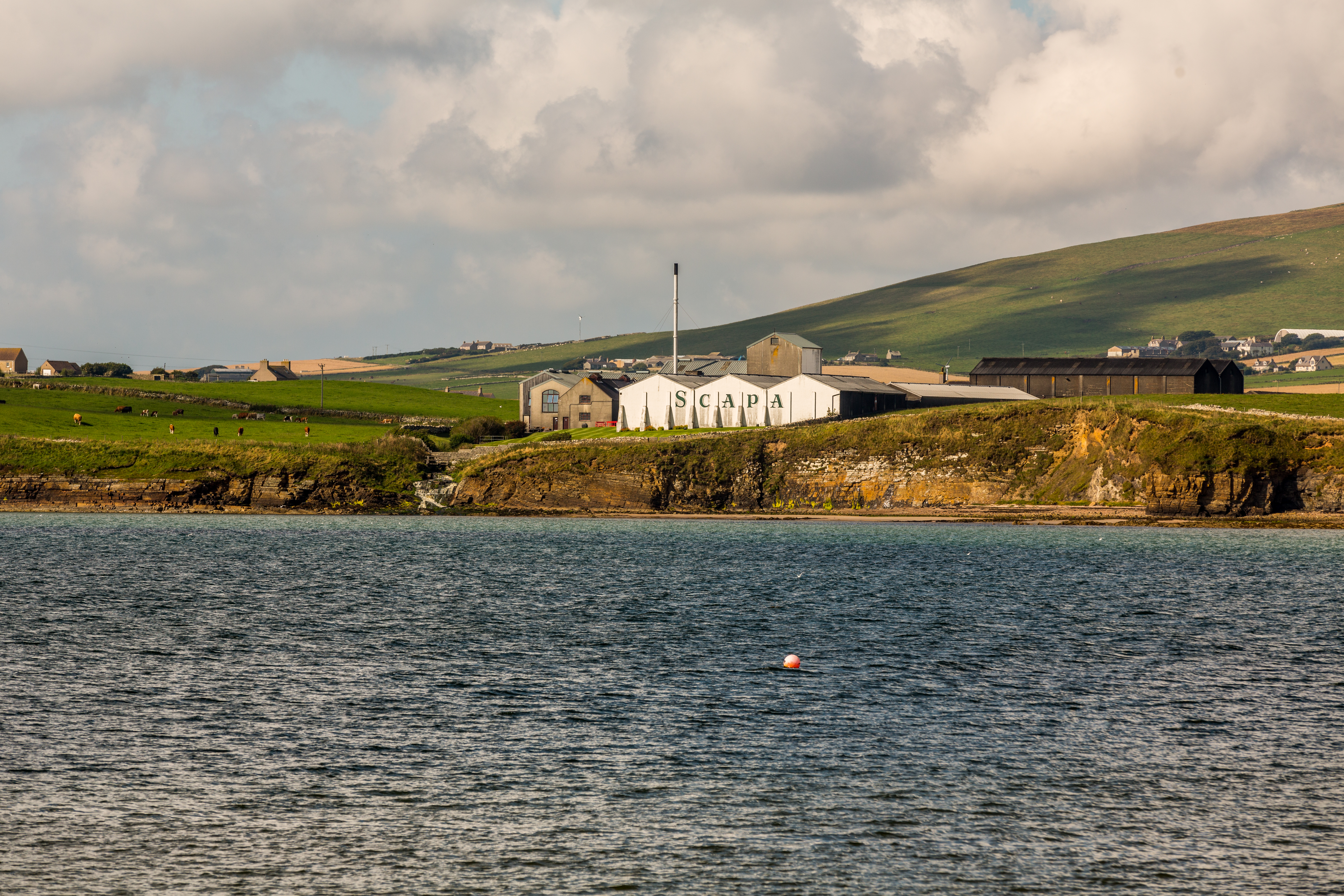
- Location: Kirkwall, Orkney
- Owner: Chivas Brothers (Pernod Ricard)
- Founded: 1885
- Status: Operational
- Water source: Lingro Burn
- No. of stills: 1 wash still 1 spirit still
- Capacity: 1,000,000 litres

Scapa
- Type: Glansa
- Type: Skiren

Scapa distillery is a Scotch whisky distillery on The Mainland of Orkney, Scotland on the shore of Scapa Flow near the town of Kirkwall. Scapa is the third-northernmost whisky distillery in Scotland, 1/2 mile (800 metres) south of the Highland Park Distillery.

== History ==
The distillery was founded in 1885 by Macfarlane & Townsend, a Glasgow blender. The distillery was almost destroyed by fire in 1919 but was saved by nearby sailors of the remaining Grand Fleet forming a human chain carrying buckets of sea water to extinguish the fire. In 1954, the distillery was acquired by Hiram Walker & Sons Ltd (now part of Pernod Ricard) and rebuilt. The distillery was again refurbished in 1978.

In 1994 the distillery was mothballed, with limited production being occasionally carried out from 1997 by nearby staff from Highland Park distillery. Ownership of the distillery had passed to Allied distillers when they bought Hiram Walker in 1987 and in 2004, when facing definitive closure, the company decided to rebuild and restore the distillery at a cost of £2.1 million. In 2005, ownership passed to Pernod Ricard and full production recommenced in October 2005.

In 2015, a visitor centre opened at the distillery.

== Production and products ==
The distillery has one wash still and one spirit still producing a single malt whisky. The wash still was a Lomond still, but the condensation plates that are the Lomonds still defining property have been removed, and it functions as a regular wash still. It produces an especially honey flavoured whisky, and less peaty than most Island Whiskies. This is because, though the water at the source is peaty, it gets transported to the distillery through pipelines to avoid more contact with the peat. Furthermore, the malt is not dried over peat smoke. The water source is the Lingro Burn, which flows into Scapa Flow.

During the period of limited production, the most commonly available edition was the Scapa 12 years old, which was and still is a most distinctive island whisky for its subtle heathery honey plus sea taste. Because of the time-gap, to full production again, it was decided to stop the 12 years and introduce the 14 years, which was quite different from its predecessor. Both products have now all but disappeared and are only available on the secondary market. The 14-year expression of the Scapa offering was given fair-to-good reviews at international spirit ratings competitions. It won gold and double gold medals at the 2005 and 2008 San Francisco World Spirits Competitions, but received a more modest score of 85 (on a 100-point scale) in 2005 from the Beverage Testing Institute.

In November 2009, a 16 years old Scapa whisky was released, with an extra two years in first fill American oak casks. The 16-year-old was discontinued in 2016.

The core products of the distillery are currently Scapa Skiren (matured in American first fill oak casks) and Scapa Glansa (a lightly smoked peat whisky). Scapa Glansa was launched in 2016 and is a no age statement whisky.

== See also ==
- Whisky
- Scotch whisky
- List of whisky brands
- List of distilleries in Scotland
