= Miltonduff =

Coordinates: 57.62638°N 3.36122°W

- Location within Moray
- OS grid reference: NJ188604
- Council area: Moray
- Country: Scotland
- Sovereign state: United Kingdom
- Post town: Elgin
- Postcode district: IV30 8
- Police: Scotland
- Fire: Scottish
- Ambulance: Scottish

Miltonduff is a hamlet 1.5 miles southwest of Elgin and is in the Scottish council area of Moray.

== History ==
The village contains a 17th or 18th century rectangular dovecote. The dovecote is Category C listed and was restored in 1970.

The village contains a First and Second World war memorial for the local area. The memorial is in the form of a stone obelisk and is located beside the village hall.

== Economy ==
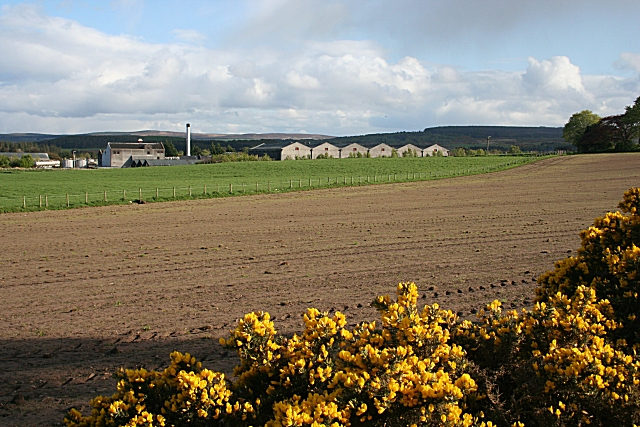
Miltonduff whisky distillery

Miltonduff Distillery is a Scotch whisky distillery in the village. Built in 1824, it is currently owned by Pernod Richard.

== Education ==
Mosstowie Primary School is located in Miltonduff and provides primary education for children in the Miltonduff, Pluscarden and Mosstowie areas.
