= Stirling Punch =

Stirling Punch is an alcoholic punch made from grain alcohol, Mount Gay Rum, and a dash of whiskey.

The drink was named after Harold Stirling Vanderbilt, a famous yachtsman who won the America's Cup three times in a row in the 1930s. Stirling Punch is most often found served at yacht club bars and parties, although its potency and ease of production allows it to be made anywhere.

Many variations of Stirling Punch exist, but all include large quantities of fruit juices and water to balance the alcohol.
