= Ballantine's =

Blended Scotch Whisky

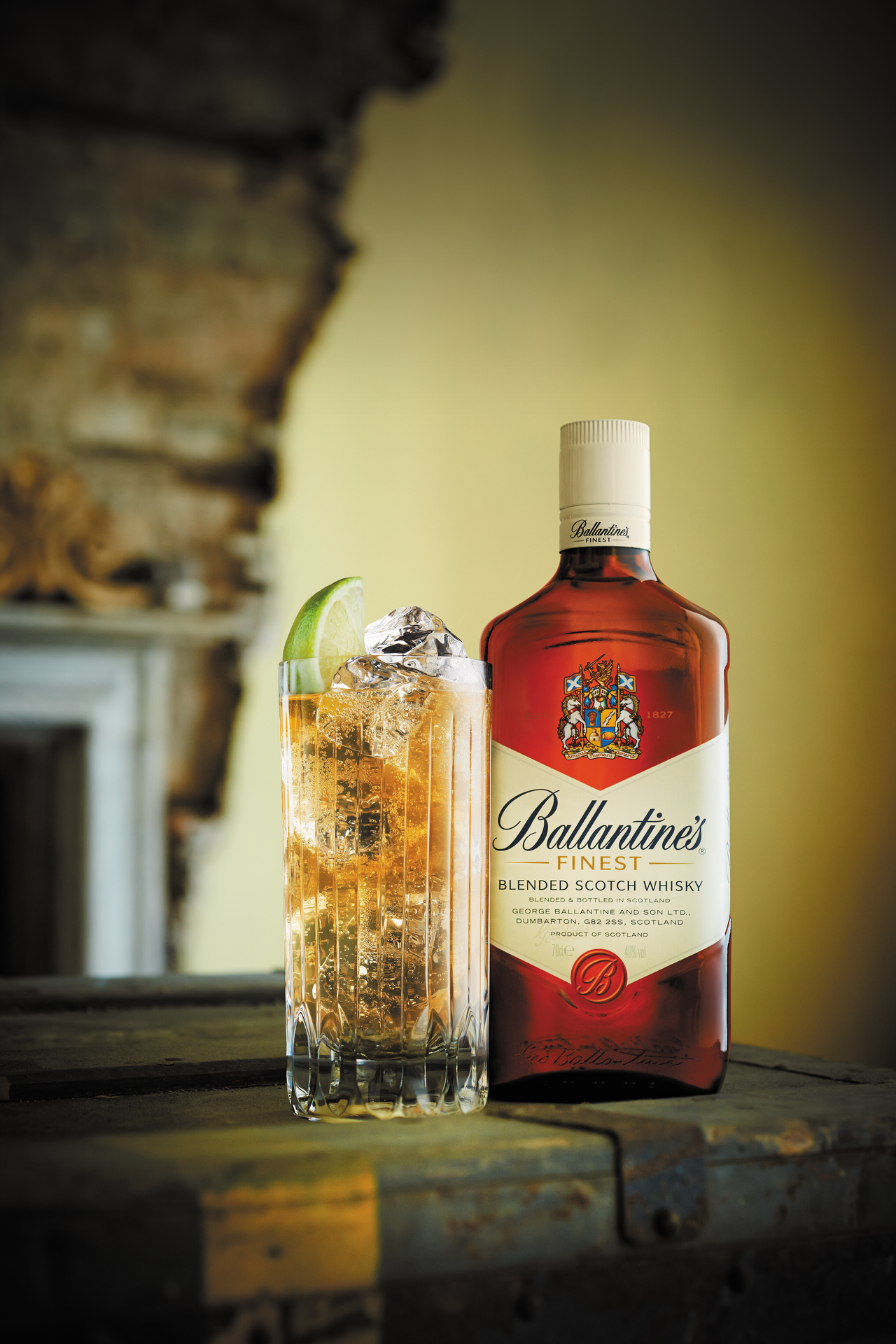
- Finest new serve
- Type: Blended Scotch whisky
- Manufacturer: Chivas Brothers (Pernod Ricard)
- Origin: Scotland
- Introduced: 1827
- Alcohol by volume: 40%
- Website: Ballantine's

Ballantine's is a brand of blended Scotch whisky produced by the Chivas Brothers subsidiary of Pernod Ricard in Dumbarton, Scotland.

The Ballantine's flavour is dependent on fingerprint malts from Miltonduff and Glenburgie, blended with 50 single malts and four single grains. The brand has won many accolades and awards for its products.

The world's second highest selling Scotch whisky in 2021 (after Johnnie Walker), it has historically been strong in Southern Europe.

According to the 2025 Brand Champions report released by The Spirits Business, Ballantine's was named the Scotch Whisky Brand Champion due to its highest sales percentage in 2024. Based on this report, Forbes listed Ballantine's as one of the 25 bestselling whisky brands in the world.

== History ==
Ballantine's Scotch whisky can trace its heritage back to 1827, when farmer's son George Ballantine set up a small grocery store in Edinburgh supplying a range of whiskies to his clientele. In 1865, George delegated the store's operation to his eldest son, Archibald, while he opened a larger establishment in Glasgow. Here he concentrated on the wine and spirit trade, catering to clients that apparently included the Hindu Royal Family. He also began to create his own blends. These inspired additional demand, drawing second son, George junior, into the business. Trading as "George Ballantine and Son Ltd", the firm added a bonded warehouse and began to export their Scotch. George senior retired in 1881 and died 10 years later at age 83 with George junior taking over.

Business thrived under George junior. The company was awarded a Royal Warrant by Queen Victoria in 1895. In 1919, the family sold out profitably to the firm of Barclay and McKinlay. Building on the reputation and goodwill of the "Ballantine's" name, the new owners focused on developing it as a brand for their blended whiskies. When increasing resources were needed to compete fully in the growing world market, the internationally experienced Canadian distilling concern of Hiram Walker Gooderham & Worts acquired Ballantine's in 1937. The next year the company received the Grant of Heraldic Arms featured on their bottles, recognising George Ballantine & Son as an "incorporation noble on the Noblesse of Scotland".

The new owners' first task was to secure fillings, to which end the Miltonduff and Glenburgie Distilleries were purchased, and a massive new grain distillery – the largest in Europe – built at Dumbarton. During the 1960s, Ballantine's expanded its focus to continental European markets, which were then emerging as significant new destinations for Scotch whisky. By 1965, the brand had established a strong commercial presence in the region and subsequently adjusted its domestic operations to prioritise growing overseas demand.

Strong distribution and the popularity of Scotch whisky in the mid-1980s were key influencers in growth. Ballantine's was named the number one brand in Europe and the third largest in the world in 1986 with the oldest product Ballantine's Finest. In 1987, the company became part of the global beverage conglomerate Allied Domecq.

In 2002, the large Dumbarton distillery was mothballed, and production shifted to the Strathclyde Grain distillery in the Gorbals of Glasgow. In 2005, Ballantine's was acquired by Pernod Ricard. Ballantine's still maintain a large bonded warehouse complex in Dumbarton East and a bottling plant to the North of the town.

In 2006, Sandy Hyslop was appointed as Ballantine's Master Blender – the 5th Master Blender in Ballantine's 180-year history.

Korean media in 2010 described Ballantine's—including its 17-, 21- and 30-year-old expressions—as among the most popular imported spirits in the country. According to Pernod Ricard Korea, Ballantine's was reported in 2019 to be the most-consumed Scotch whisky in South Korea over a three-year period, with a market share of roughly 28%.

In November 2024, Ballantine's released its first single grain expression, named Ballantine's Single Distillery.

== Products ==
Ballantine's produces a range of expressions with various characteristics and age statements:

- Ballantine's Finest: blended – "soft, sweet and complex"
- Ballantine's Limited: blended – "creamy soft and smooth"
- Ballantine's 12 Year Old: blended – "fresh, soft, and nutty"
- Ballantine's 12 Year Old "Pure Malt": blended malt – "honey sweet, spicy and deep"
- Ballantine's 17 Year Old: blended – "creamy, harmonious and oak-sweetness"
- Ballantine's 21 Year Old: blended – "spig, aromatic and heather smoke"
- Ballantine's 30 Year Old: blended – "rich, oak influenced and lingering"
- Ballantine's 40 Year Old: blended – "incredible depth, complex and extremely fruity"

== Awards ==
Ballantine's whiskies have received several awards across major competitions including the International Spirits Challenge (ISC), the International Wine and Spirit Competition (IWSC) and the World Whiskies Awards (WWA). At the 2021 IWSC, Ballantine's Glenburgie Single Malt 15 Year Old and Ballantine's Glentauchers Single Malt 23 Year Old won the Gold Outstanding award under the Single Malts category. In 2024, Ballantine's 30 Year Old was awarded the World's Best Blended Whisky and the Best Scottish Blended Whisky at the World Whiskies Awards.

Year	Awarding Body	Product	Award	Ref.
2026	ISC	Ballantine's 21 Year Old	Gold	
2026	ISC	Ballantine's 23 Year Old	Gold	
2026	ISC	Ballantine's 30 Year Old	Gold	
2026	ISC	Ballantine's 10 Year Old	Silver	
2026	ISC	Ballantine's 17 Year Old	Silver	
2026	ISC	Ballantine's Finest	Silver	
2026	WWA	Ballantine's 23 Year Old	World's Best Blended	
2025	ISC	Ballantine's 17 Year Old	Gold	
2025	ISC	Ballantine's 10 Year Old	Gold	
2025	ISC	Ballantine's 7 American Barrel	Gold	
2025	ISC	Ballantine's 23 Year Old	Gold	
2025	ISC	Ballantine's 30 Year Old	Gold	
2025	ISC	Ballantine's Finest	Silver	
2025	ISC	Ballantine's 21 Year Old	Silver	
2025	ISC	Ballantine's Single Distillery	Silver	
2025	ISC	Ballantine's Sweet Blend	Bronze	
2025	ISC	Ballantine's Glenburgie Single Malt 15 Year Old	Silver	
2025	ISC	Ballantine's Glenburgie Single Malt 18 Year Old	Silver	
2025	IWSC	Ballantine's 17 Year Old	Bronze	
2025	IWSC	Ballantine's Glenburgie Single Malt 15 Year Old	Gold (95 pts)	
2025	IWSC	Ballantine's 21 Year Old	Silver (91 pts)	
2025	IWSC	Ballantine's 23 Year Old	Silver (92 pts)	
2025	IWSC	Ballantine's 10 Year Old	Bronze	
2025	IWSC	Ballantine's Finest	Bronze	
2025	IWSC	Ballantine's Single Distillery	Bronze	
2025	IWSC	Ballantine's Sweet Blend	Bronze	
2025	IWSC	Ballantine's Whisky & Cola Pre-Mixed Can	Bronze	
2025	IWSC	Ballantine's 7 American Barrel	Bronze	
2025	IWSC	Ballantine's 30 Year Old	Bronze	
2025	IWSC	Ballantine's Glenburgie Single Malt 18 Year Old	Silver (90 pts)	
2024	ISC	Ballantine's 17 Year Old	Gold	
2024	ISC	Ballantine's 21 Year Old	Gold	
2024	ISC	Ballantine's 23 Year Old	Gold	
2024	ISC	Ballantine's 30 Year Old	Gold	
2024	ISC	Ballantine's Glenburgie Single Malt 12 Year Old	Gold	
2024	ISC	Ballantine's Glenburgie Single Malt 15 Year Old	Gold	
2024	ISC	Ballantine's Finest	Gold	
2024	ISC	Ballantine's Glenburgie Single Malt 18 Year Old	Gold	
2024	ISC	Ballantine's 7 American Barrel	Silver	
2024	ISC	Ballantine's 10 Year Old	Silver	
2024	IWSC	Ballantine's Glentauchers Single Malt 17 Year Old	Gold (96 pts)	
2024	IWSC	Ballantine's 17 Year Old	Silver (94 pts)	
2024	IWSC	Ballantine's 10 Year Old	Silver (90 pts)	
2024	IWSC	Ballantine's 30 Year Old	Silver (90 pts)	
2024	IWSC	Ballantine's Finest	Silver (90 pts)	
2024	IWSC	Ballantine's Glenburgie Single Malt 12 Year Old	Silver (94 pts)	
2024	IWSC	Ballantine's Glenburgie Single Malt 18 Year Old	Silver (90 pts)	
2024	IWSC	Ballantine's 23 Year Old	Bronze	
2024	IWSC	Ballantine's 21 Year Old	Bronze	
2024	IWSC	Ballantine's 7 American Barrel	Bronze	
2024	IWSC	Ballantine's Glenburgie Single Malt 15 Year Old	Bronze	
2024	WWA	Ballantine's 30 Year Old	Category Winner	
2024	WWA	Ballantine's 30 Year Old	Best Scotch Blended	
2024	WWA	Ballantine's 30 Year Old	World's Best Blended	
2024	WWA	Ballantine's 30 Year Old	Gold	
2024	WWA	Ballantine's Finest	Silver	
2024	WWA	Ballantine's 10 Year Old	Bronze	
2024	WWA	Ballantine's 21 Year Old	Gold	
2024	WWA	Ballantine's Glentauchers Single Malt 17 Year Old	Bronze	
2024	WWA	Ballantine's Miltonduff Single Malt 17 Year Old	Silver	
2023	ISC	Ballantine's 17 Year Old	Gold	
2023	ISC	Ballantine's 21 Year Old	Gold	
2023	ISC	Ballantine's 23 Year Old	Gold	
2023	ISC	Ballantine's Glenburgie Single Malt 15 Year Old	Gold	
2023	ISC	Ballantine's Glenburgie Single Malt 18 Year Old	Gold	
2023	ISC	Ballantine's 30 Year Old	Silver	
2023	ISC	Ballantine's Glenburgie Single Malt 12 Year Old	Silver	
2023	IWSC	Ballantine's 17 Year Old	Gold (95 pts)	
2023	IWSC	Ballantine's 21 Year Old	Silver (91 pts)	
2023	IWSC	Ballantine's 23 Year Old	Silver (91 pts)	
2023	IWSC	Ballantine's 30 Year Old	Silver (92 pts)	
2023	IWSC	Ballantine's Glenburgie Single Malt 12 Year Old	Bronze	
2023	IWSC	Ballantine's Glenburgie Single Malt 15 Year Old	Silver (91 pts)	
2023	IWSC	Ballantine's Glenburgie Single Malt 17 Year Old	Gold (95 pts)	
2023	IWSC	Ballantine's Miltonduff Single Malt 17 Year Old	Silver (90 pts)	
2023	IWSC	Ballantine's Glenburgie Single Malt 18 Year Old	Gold (96 pts)	
2023	WWA	Ballantine's 17 Year Old	Gold	
2023	WWA	Ballantine's 21 Year Old	Silver	
2023	WWA	Ballantine's 7 American Barrel	Silver	
2023	WWA	Ballantine's 23 Year Old	Bronze	
2022	ISC	Ballantine's 17 Year Old Tribute Release	Gold	
2022	ISC	Ballantine's 30 Year Old	Gold	
2022	ISC	Ballantine's Glenburgie Single Malt 15 Year Old	Gold	
2022	ISC	Ballantine's Glenburgie Single Malt 18 Year Old	Gold	
2022	ISC	Ballantine's Glentauchers Single Malt 23 Year Old	Gold	
2022	IWSC	Ballantine's 17 Year Old	Silver (94 pts)	
2022	IWSC	Ballantine's Finest	Gold (96 pts)	
2022	IWSC	Ballantine's 21 Year Old	Silver (92 pts)	
2022	IWSC	Ballantine's 23 Year Old	Silver (94 pts)	
2022	IWSC	Ballantine's 30 Year Old	Silver (94 pts)	
2022	IWSC	Ballantine's Glenburgie Single Malt 15 Year Old	Silver (93 pts)	
2022	IWSC	Ballantine's Glenburgie Single Malt 12 Year Old	Gold (98 pts)	
2022	IWSC	Ballantine's Glenburgie Single Malt 12 Year Old	Trophy	
2022	IWSC	Ballantine's Glentauchers Single Malt 23 Year Old	Silver (93 pts)	
2022	IWSC	Ballantine's Miltonduff Single Malt 15 Year Old	Silver (94 pts)	
2022	IWSC	Ballantine's 17 Year Old Tribute Release	Silver (94 pts)	
2022	WWA	Ballantine's 17 Year Old	Silver	
2021	ISC	Ballantine's 17 Year Old	Gold	
2021	ISC	Ballantine's 23 Year Old	Gold	
2021	ISC	Ballantine's 30 Year Old	Gold	
2021	IWSC	Ballantine's 17 Year Old	Silver (92 pts)	
2021	IWSC	Ballantine's 23 Year Old	Silver (93 pts)	
2021	IWSC	Ballantine's 30 Year Old	Silver (92 pts)	
2021	IWSC	Ballantine's 7 American Barrel	Silver (92 pts)	
2021	IWSC	Ballantine's Finest	Silver (92 pts)	
2021	IWSC	Ballantine's Glenburgie Single Malt 12 Year Old	Silver (91 pts)	
2021	IWSC	Ballantine's Glenburgie Single Malt 15 Year Old	Gold (98 pts)	
2021	IWSC	Ballantine's Glenburgie Single Malt 18 Year Old	Gold (95 pts)	
2021	IWSC	Ballantine's Glentauchers Single Malt 23 Year Old	Gold (98 pts)	
2021	IWSC	Ballantine's Miltonduff Single Malt 15 Year Old	Gold (95 pts)	
2021	IWSC	Ballantine's Miltonduff Single Malt 19 Year Old	Gold (95 pts)	
2021	WWA	Ballantine's Finest	Silver	
2021	WWA	Ballantine's 23 Year Old	Silver	
2020	ISC	Ballantine's Glenburgie Single Malt 15 Year Old	Trophy	
2020	ISC	Ballantine's 17 Year Old	Gold	
2020	ISC	Ballantine's 21 Year Old	Gold	
2020	ISC	Ballantine's 23 Year Old	Gold	
2020	ISC	Ballantine's 30 Year Old	Gold	
2020	ISC	Ballantine's Finest	Gold	
2020	ISC	Ballantine's Miltonduff Single Malt 15 Year Old	Gold	
2020	IWSC	Ballantine's 17 Year Old	Silver (93 pts)	
2020	IWSC	Ballantine's 21 Year Old	Bronze	
2020	IWSC	Ballantine's 23 Year Old	Silver (93 pts)	
2020	IWSC	Ballantine's 30 Year Old	Silver (94 pts)	
2020	IWSC	Ballantine's Glenburgie Single Malt 15 Year Old	Silver (93 pts)	
2020	IWSC	Ballantine's Finest	Bronze	
2020	IWSC	Ballantine's Miltonduff Single Malt 15 Year Old	Silver (91 pts)	
2020	WWA	Ballantine's 17 Year Old	Category Winner	
2019	ISC	Ballantine's 17 Year Old	Silver	
2019	ISC	Ballantine's Finest	Silver	
2019	IWSC	Ballantine's Finest	Silver (90 pts)	
2019	IWSC	Ballantine's 17 Year Old	Silver (91 pts)	
2018	ISC	Ballantine's 30 Year Old	Trophy	
2018	ISC	Ballantine's 17 Year Old	Gold	
2018	ISC	Ballantine's Finest	Silver	
2018	ISC	Ballantine's 21 Year Old	Silver	
2018	IWSC	Ballantine's 17 Year Old	Silver	
2018	IWSC	Ballantine's 21 Year Old	Silver Outstanding	
2018	IWSC	Ballantine's 30 Year Old	Gold Outstanding	
2018	IWSC	Ballantine's Glenburgie Single Malt 15 Year Old	Silver Outstanding	
2018	IWSC	Ballantine's Brasil	Bronze	
2018	IWSC	Ballantine's Miltonduff Single Malt 15 Year Old	Silver	
2017	ISC	Ballantine's Limited	Gold	
2017	ISC	Ballantine's 30 Year Old	Gold	
2017	ISC	Ballantine's Finest	Silver	
2017	ISC	Ballantine's 17 Year Old	Silver	
2017	ISC	Ballantine's 21 Year Old	Silver	
2017	IWSC	Ballantine's 17 Year Old	Gold	
2017	IWSC	Ballantine's 21 Year Old	Silver Outstanding	
2017	IWSC	Ballantine's Finest	Silver Outstanding	
2017	IWSC	Ballantine's Brasil	Bronze	
2017	IWSC	Ballantine's 30 Year Old	Silver Outstanding	
2016	ISC	Ballantine's 30 Year Old	Gold	
2016	ISC	Ballantine's 17 Year Old	Silver	
2016	ISC	Ballantine's 21 Year Old	Silver	
2016	ISC	Ballantine's Finest	Silver	
2016	ISC	Ballantine's Limited	Silver	
2016	IWSC	Ballantine's 21 Year Old	Gold Outstanding	
2016	IWSC	Ballantine's 17 Year Old	Gold	
2016	IWSC	Ballantine's 30 Year Old	Gold	
2016	IWSC	Ballantine's Limited	Silver Outstanding	
2016	IWSC	Ballantine's Brasil	Silver	
2016	IWSC	Ballantine's Finest	Silver	
2015	ISC	Ballantine's 17 Year Old	Trophy	
2015	ISC	Ballantine's 30 Year Old	Trophy	
2015	ISC	Ballantine's 21 Year Old	Silver	
2015	ISC	Ballantine's Finest	Silver	
2015	ISC	Ballantine's Brasil	Bronze	
2015	ISC	Ballantine's Limited	Silver	
2015	IWSC	Ballantine's 17 Year Old	Gold	
2015	IWSC	Ballantine's 21 Year Old	Gold	
2015	IWSC	Ballantine's 30 Year Old	Gold Outstanding	
2015	IWSC	Ballantine's 30 Year Old	Trophy - Blended Scotch Whisky	
2015	IWSC	Ballantine's Brasil	Silver	
2015	IWSC	Ballantine's Finest	Silver	
2015	IWSC	Ballantine's Limited	Silver Outstanding	
2014	ISC	Ballantine's 30 Year Old	Gold	
2014	ISC	Ballantine's Limited	Silver	
2014	ISC	Ballantine's 17 Year Old	Silver	
2014	ISC	Ballantine's Finest	Silver	
2014	ISC	Ballantine's 21 Year Old	Silver	
2014	IWSC	Ballantine's Limited	Gold	
2014	IWSC	Ballantine's Finest	Gold	
2014	IWSC	Ballantine's 17 Year Old	Silver Outstanding	
2014	IWSC	Ballantine's 21 Year Old	Silver	
2014	IWSC	Ballantine's 30 Year Old	Silver Outstanding	
2013	ISC	Ballantine's 17 Year Old	Gold	
2013	ISC	Ballantine's 30 Year Old	Gold	
2013	ISC	Ballantine's Finest	Gold	
2013	ISC	Ballantine's 21 Year Old	Silver	
2013	ISC	Ballantine's Limited	Silver	
2013	IWSC	Ballantine's 17 Year Old	Silver Outstanding	
2013	IWSC	Ballantine's 21 Year Old	Silver Outstanding	
2013	IWSC	Ballantine's 30 Year Old	Silver	
2013	IWSC	Ballantine's Finest	Silver	
2013	IWSC	Ballantine's Limited	Silver Outstanding	
2012	ISC	Ballantine's 30 Year Old	Gold	
2012	ISC	Ballantine's 17 Year Old	Silver	
2012	ISC	Ballantine's 21 Year Old	Silver	
2012	ISC	Ballantine's Finest	Silver	
2012	ISC	Ballantine's Limited	Silver	
2011	ISC	Ballantine's 17 Year Old	Silver	
2011	ISC	Ballantine's 21 Year Old	Silver	
2011	ISC	Ballantine's 30 Year Old	Silver	
2011	ISC	Ballantine's Finest	Silver	
2011	ISC	Ballantine's Limited	Silver	
2010	ISC	Ballantine's 17 Year Old	Gold	
2010	ISC	Ballantine's 21 Year Old	Silver	
2010	ISC	Ballantine's 30 Year Old	Silver	
2010	ISC	Ballantine's Finest	Silver	
2010	ISC	Ballantine's Limited	Bronze	
2009	ISC	Ballantine's 21 Year Old	Silver	
2009	ISC	Ballantine's 30 Year Old	Silver	
2009	ISC	Ballantine's 17 Year Old	Silver	
2009	ISC	Ballantine's Finest	Bronze	
2009	ISC	Ballantine's Limited	Bronze	
2008	ISC	Ballantine's 30 Year Old	Gold	
2008	ISC	Ballantine's 17 Year Old	Silver	
2008	ISC	Ballantine's 21 Year Old	Silver	
2007	ISC	Ballantine's 30 Year Old	Trophy	
2007	ISC	Ballantine's Finest	Bronze	
2007	ISC	Ballantine's 21 Year Old	Silver	
2007	ISC	Ballantine's 17 Year Old	Commended	

== Sponsorships and partnerships ==
=== Golf ===
Ballantine's association with golf started in 1960 when the first Ballantine's Tournament took place at Wentworth Club, and since then has sponsored many golf events.

==== Aberdeen Asset Management Scottish Open ====
In 2007, Ballantine's became an official sponsor of the Aberdeen Asset Management Scottish Open tournament, and continued until 2015.

==== Barclays Scottish Open ====
In 2007, Ballantine's signed a three-year agreement and became an official sponsor for the Barclays Scottish Open.

==== Ballantine’s Championship ====
From 2008, for five years, Ballantine's was the title sponsor of the Ballantine's Championship, the first European Tour event in Korea.

==== BMW Masters (Shanghai) ====
In 2012, Ballantine's was included as one of the sponsors of the BMW Masters.

==== Kolon Korea Open ====
In 2014, Ballantine's entered a three-year sponsorship agreement with the Kolon Korea Open Golf Championship.

==== Ballantine’s Golf Club ====
In July 2014, Ballantine's launched the Ballantine's Golf Club, the first online golf club of its kind. World-renowned golfer Ian Poulter was the club's founding captain, followed by Paul McGinley in 2015.

=== Gaming ===
==== The Dota 2 International 2023 ====
Ballantine's partnered with Tundra, an Esports team, for The Dota 2 International 2023. The brand was the Official Spirit Partner of the game's tenth anniversary. Ballantine's released two limited-edition Ballantine's Finest x Dota 2 bottles. The labels on these bottles featured the Dota 2 brand and characters including Juggernaut, Lina, Monkey King, Marci and Brewmaster. This partnership was exclusive to China.

==== Borderlands ====
In April 2022, Ballantine's announced a partnership with the video game series, Borderlands. The brand “hired” the video game character Mad Moxxi as Chief Galactic Expansion Officer to launch Ballantine's in the gaming universe. As part of this partnership, Ballantine's released a limited edition bottling, the Ballantine's Finest Moxxi's Bar Edition whisky, with a label depicting Moxxi and her characteristic style.

=== True Music Icons ===
Ballantine's has released True Music Icons, a limited-edition series that pays homage to some of the world-renowned music artists and bands.

==== Gorillaz ====
In October 2025, Ballantine's released the Ballantine's Finest Gorillaz limited edition commemorating 25 years since the band's formation. The bottle design features a never-before-seen illustration of the four fictional band members, 2-D, Murdoc Niccals, Noodle and Russel Hobbs, created especially for this collaboration.

==== KISS ====
Ballantine's Finest KISS limited edition whisky released in October 2025 is a tribute to the American rock band KISS. The release comes just before KISS's return to stage at KISS Kruise: Landlocked In Vegas, which marks the 50th anniversary of the KISS Army fan club. The limited edition bottle features artwork based on the band's 1976 Destroyer album cover.

==== Elton John ====
In September 2024, Ballantine's honoured Elton John with a limited edition of the Ballantine's Finest whisky as part of the True Music Icons. The bottle design is inspired by his live performance at Dodger Stadium in 1975. The holographic version of his ‘E’ star logo reflects the artwork on his Diamonds Greatest Hits collection.

==== John Lennon ====
Ballantine's paid tribute to John Lennon with the Ballantine's John Lennon limited edition in September 2024. The bottle design is inspired by his famous self-portrait, official logo and iconography.

==== AC/DC ====
In September 2023, Ballantine's launched the AC/DC Limited Edition whisky as a tribute to the iconic rock band in its 50th anniversary year. This limited edition of Ballantine's Finest whisky showcased the band's thunderbolt logo in neon red.

==== Queen ====
In September 2023, Ballantine's released the Ballantine's Finest Queen limited edition whisky to pay tribute to the legendary British band, Queen. The bottle is inspired by the band's iconic Greatest Hits II album with the crest designed by Freddie Mercury.

=== Ballantine’s True Music Fund ===
In 2021, Ballantine's introduced the True Music Fund, an annual six-figure funding plan for music initiatives worldwide to encourage grassroots change. By the end of 2025, the initiative will have supported more than 30 music collectives and committed £500,000 in funding. In 2025, Ballantine's offered £100,000 to eight recipients along with mentorship from an established industry expert. The ten recipients of the True Music Fund in 2023 were Femme Africa, iMullar, El Bloque, Santuri East Africa, The Other Radio, Jokkoo Collective, Femmes and Thems, Anti-Mass, Feminine Hi-Fi, Africa Rising Music Conference.

=== Stay True/Limited Editions ===
==== RZA ====
In 2023, Ballantine's collaborated with RZA, Wu-Tang Clan frontman, coinciding with the 50th anniversary of Hip Hop and the 30th anniversary of Wu-Tang Clan's debut album, Enter the Wu-Tang (36 Chambers).

As part of its Stay True lifestyle, Ballantine's and RZA released a series of “drops”, one of them being a limited-edition Ballantine's x RZA Crosley record player and a Montero Bluetooth speaker. The C6 player was designed by RZA and featured the iconic “Wu” hand sign.

Ballantine's also released the Ballantine's 7 American Barrel x RZA Limited Edition whisky. The artwork on the bottle incorporated a poem written by RZA on his trip to Scotland and also included the Wu-Tang Clan hands motif.

The partnership expanded beyond whisky into fashion and food collaborations. Ballantine's and RZA worked with Japanese streetwear brand, NEIGHBORHOOD, on a bespoke capsule collection of apparel and accessories. They also partnered with Flying Goose to create a whisky-inspired vegan hot sriracha sauce.

==== J. Demsky ====
In November 2022, Ballantine's released the Ballantine's x J. Demsky limited edition bottle to mark its collaboration with J. Demsky, a Spanish visual artist. The bottle was designed by J. Demsky's in his signature style with trademark technicolour patterns and disruptive shapes.

Shawna X

In 2021, Ballantine's collaborated with New York-based visual artist Shawna X and released the Ballantine's Finest Shawna X limited edition whisky with Shawna X's bold and colourful design.

Ballantine's also launched a global mural project in partnership with Shawna X and local artists in Spanish and Brazilian cities, aiming to “bring joy and colour back to communities”. The campaign also introduced a grant fund as a post-pandemic support to independent bars, event spaces and nightlife venues.

==== Joshua Vides ====
In 2020, Ballantine's released the Ballantine's Finest Joshua Vides Limited Edition designed by Californian artist Joshua Vides. The bottle and gift tin were designed with Vides’ signature monochromatic style. As part of the collaboration, Vides also created a briefcase and tumbler set inspired by Ballantine's rectangular bottle shape and its Prohibition-era history. The launch was supported by a series of black and white spaces where events and workshops were hosted at pop-ups in cities including Poland and China.

==== Felipe Pantone ====
In 2018, Ballantine's partnered with Felipe Pantone, an Argentinian-Spanish street artist, as part of the Ballantine's True Music Series. Ballantine's released limited-editions of its Ballantine's Finest and Ballantine's 12 Years Old that had been designed by Pantone with distinctive geometric patterns, classic arches, vivid colours and holograms.
