= Bruichladdich distillery =

Scotch whisky distillery on Islay, Scotland

Coordinates: 55.766359°N 6.3625°W

Bruichladdich Distillery
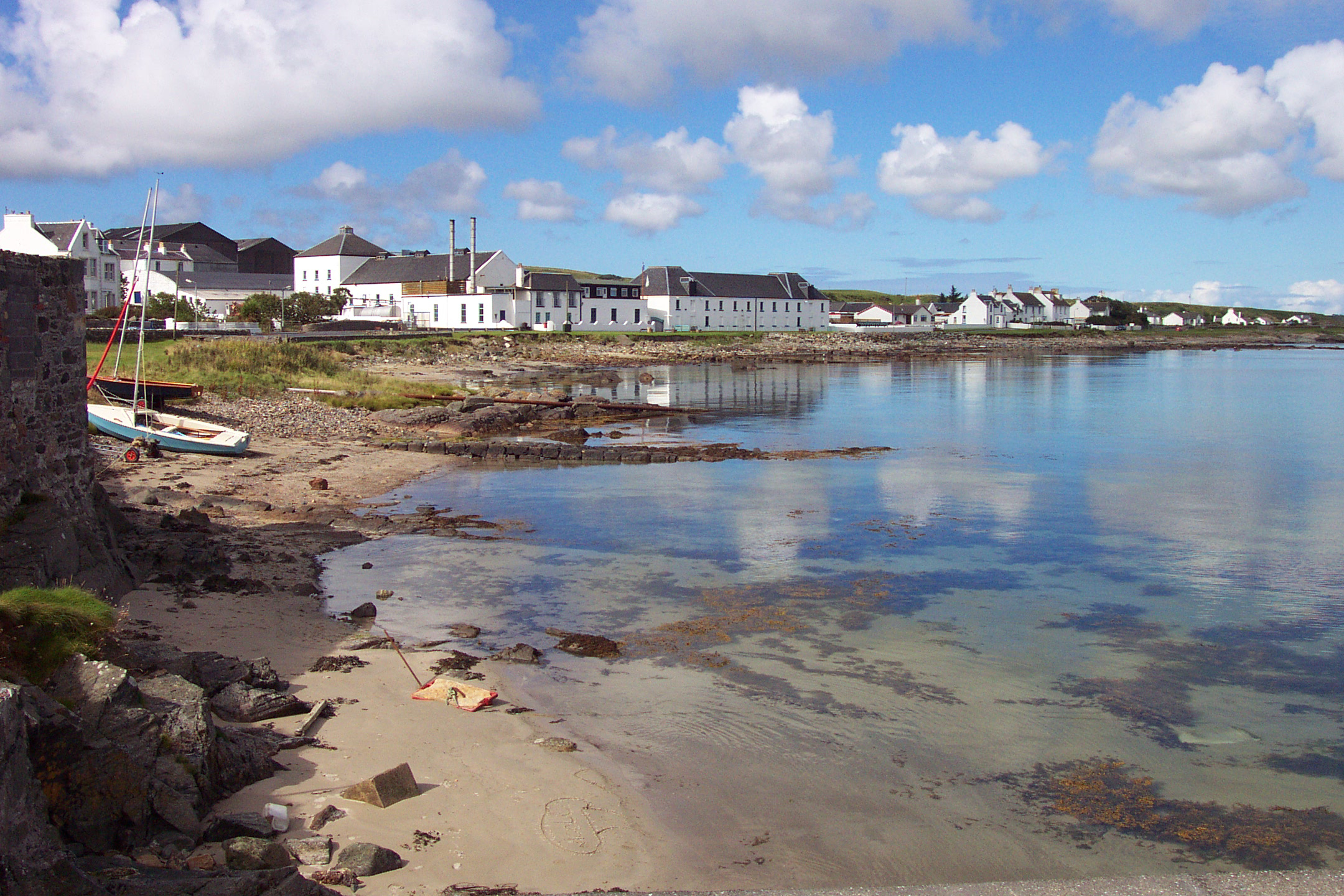
- Taigh-staile Bhruthach a' Chladaich

Region: Islay
- Location: Rhinns of the isle of Islay, Scotland
- Owner: The Bruichladdich Distillery Co. Ltd
- Founded: 1881
- Status: Operational
- Water source: Bruichladdich loch (mash), burn (cooling), and Octomore spring (bottling)
- No. of stills: 2 wash (12,000 litres); 2 spirit (11,000 litres); 1 Lomond (adjustable)
- Capacity: 1,500,000 litres
- Mothballed: 1907–1918, 1929–1935, 1941–1945, 1994–2000

Bruichladdich (Unpeated)
- Age(s): 2023 Core Range: Bruichladdich The Classic Laddie; Bruichladdich Islay Barley; Bruichladdich The Organic; Bruichladdich Bere Barley; Bruichladdich Black Art
- Cask type(s): American Oak, European Oak, Virgin Oak

Port Charlotte (Heavily Peated)
- Age(s): 10, Islay Barley, SC:01
- Cask type(s): American Oak, European Oak, Virgin Oak

Octomore (Super Heavily Peated)
- Age(s): Octomore 13.1, Octomore 13.2, Octomore 13.3, Octomore 13.4
- Cask type(s): American Oak

Bruichladdich Distillery logo

Bruichladdich Distillery (/brʊxˈlædi/ bruukh-LAD-ee; Scottish Gaelic: Bruthach a' Chladaich /pɾuə'xl̪ˠat̪ɪç/) is a distillery on the Rhinns of the isle of Islay in Scotland. The distillery produces mainly single malt Scotch whisky and The Botanist gin. Originally established in 1881 but closed many times throughout its history, its current form was opened in 2001. It has been owned by Rémy Cointreau since 2012.

The name Bruichladdich is an anglicisation of Bruthach a' Chladaich, Scottish Gaelic for Brae (hillside) of the Shore.

== History ==
Bruichladdich was built in 1881 by the Harvey brothers—William (32), John (31) and Robert (23)—on the shore of Loch Indaal, on the Rinns of Islay, the westernmost part of the island. The Harveys were a dynastic whisky family that had owned two Glasgow distilleries since 1770. Using an inheritance, the three brothers combined their talents to build a third distillery—Bruichladdich—designed by John, engineered by Robert, and financed by William and other family members. At the time, the distillery was a state-of-the-art design unlike Islay's older distilleries, which had developed from old farm buildings. It was built from stone from the sea shore and has a very efficient layout, built around a large, spacious courtyard.

The uniquely tall and narrow-necked stills were chosen to produce a very pure and original spirit, the opposite of the styles produced by the older farm distilleries. Bruichladdich was run by William Harvey, after a quarrel with his brothers before the distillery was even completed, until a fire on 8 April 1933 and his death in 1936. It was then owned by Associated Scottish Distilleries Ltd. In 1969 it was sold by Bruichladdich Proprietors Ltd to Invergordon Distillers Ltd. It was then purchased by Whyte and Mackay and in 1994 it was shut down as being 'surplus to requirements'.

The distillery was subsequently purchased by a group of private investors led by Mark Reynier of Murray McDavid on 19 December 2000. Jim McEwan, who had worked at Bowmore Distillery since the age of 15, was hired as master distiller and production director. Between January and May 2001 the whole distillery was dismantled and reassembled, with the original Victorian décor and equipment retained. Having escaped modernisation, most of the original Harvey machinery is still in use today. No computers are used in production with all processes controlled by a pool of skilled artisans who pass on information orally and largely measure progress using dipsticks and simple flotation devices.

On 23 July 2012, it was announced that Rémy Cointreau reached an agreement with The Bruichladdich Distillery Co. Ltd to buy the company for a sum of £58m.

In 2023, the distillery ranked fourth in a Cask Connoisseur ranking of the most popular whisky distilleries.

== Today ==
All the distillery's whiskies are sold as single malts, with those designated Bruichladdich being unpeated, those designated Port Charlotte being heavily peated and those designated Octomore being super-heavily peated. Octomore is considered to be 'the most heavily peated single malt whisky in the world'.

The distillery moved to full production in 2013. All barley used is exclusively Scottish, some of which has been grown on Islay since 2004. The provenance of the barley used is extremely important philosophically and this is increasingly reflected in the marketing and presentation of the product range. Individual farms, farmers and even the fields in which the grain is grown, are identified on the packaging where possible.

The distillery's commitment to Islay has resulted in the creation of an island-based management and administrative system, including the construction of the island's only commercially scaled bottling hall. The company is the largest private employer on Islay with around sixty jobs on the island.

From 2009, Bruichladdich was distributed in the UK by Blavod Wines and Spirits plc. In 2013 it set up its own UK distribution company Bruichladdich UK Distribution Ltd, which is based in Glasgow.

In 2011, the distillery started production of The Botanist gin. In 2024, the distillery released two different aged gins, a new category of spirits where the gin is aged in various red wine, sherry and bourbon whiskey barrels. The Cask Rested Gin is aged for at least six months, while the Cask Aged Gin is aged for at least three years in rum and sauternes barrels.

== Victorian equipment ==
The distillery still uses the original 'open' 7-tonne "mashtun"—the only one on the island, and one of only a handful still in existence. There are six wooden washbacks made from Douglas Fir (sometimes called Oregon Pine), together, 210,000 litres. There are two "wash stills" (together 23,000 litres), two unusually tall (6 metre) and narrow-necked (0.9m) "spirit stills" (together 21,000 litres). Annual output is currently 1.5 million ola's, which is considered close to current capacity.

Much of the equipment in use is the original Victorian equipment. The process is gravity fed and no computers are used in production, apart from in the offices clerically and to run a series of eight webcams. These webcams were the focus of an intelligence operation by the (American) Defense Threat Reduction Agency, when the distillery's antique distilling equipment was mistaken for that purportedly used for Iraq's elusive chemical weapons. This story has roots in an e-mail sent by an American agent to the distillery when one of the webcams had broken. A limited run of commemorative WMD bottles were released in honour of the story, while a second WMD bottling, Yellow Submarine, was issued when an Islay fisherman found a MoD submarine ROV, and a minor farcical affair ensued.

In 2010 the last authentic Lomond still (recovered during the demolition of Inverleven distillery in Dumbarton) was installed at Bruichladdich and, following modifications by Master Distiller Jim McEwan, was added to their still room in order to create a smoother new make spirit, this addition commenced the distillation of ‘The Botanist’ Islay dry gin in 2011 . Bruichladdich has five pot stills, two wash stills with about 12,000 litres volume and two spirit stills with about 11,000 litres volume. The pot stills at Bruichladdich are very pear-shaped and tall. The Lomond still is an adjustable still so the amount of reflux can be adjusted through different setups of the neck and the lyne arm.

== Gallery ==
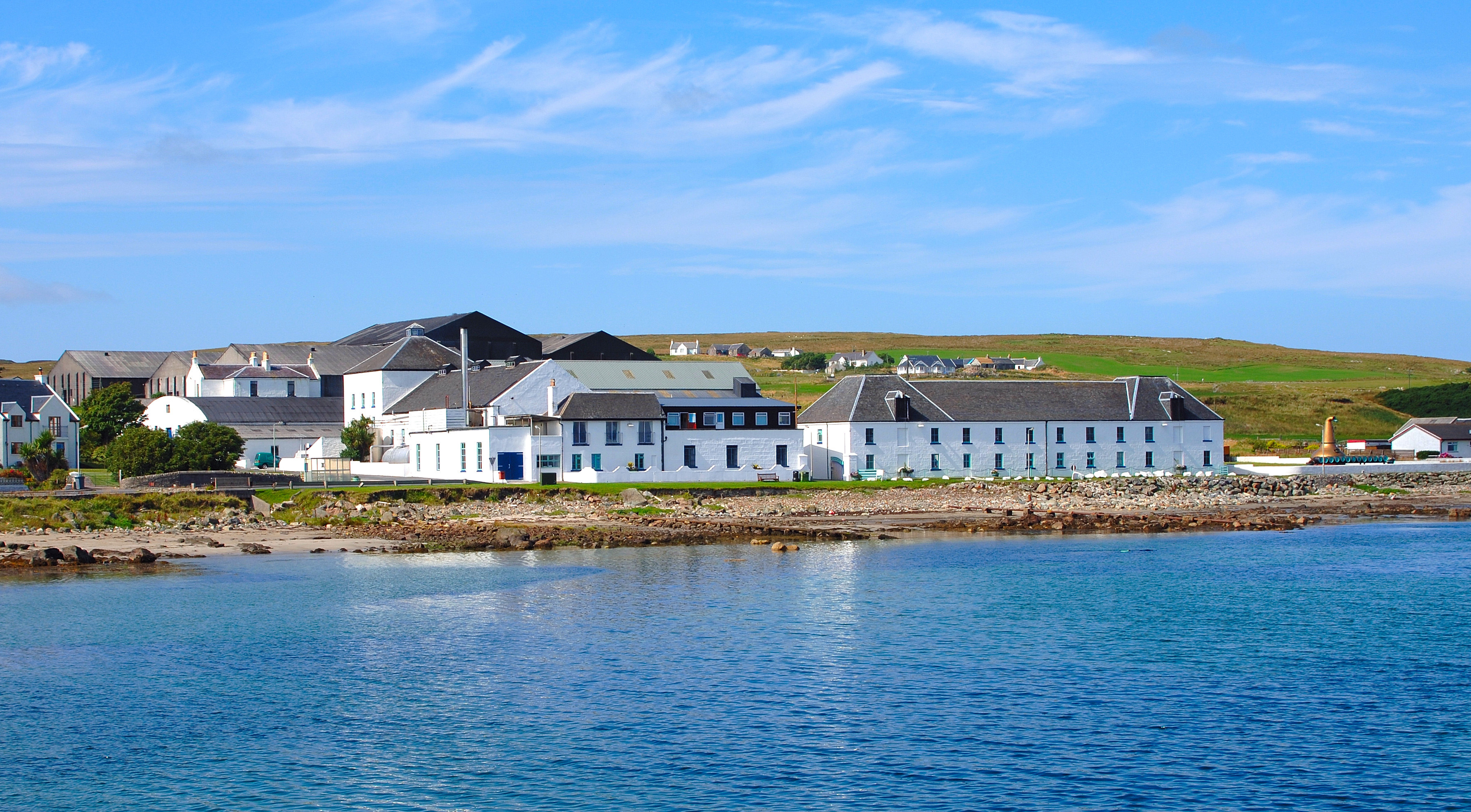

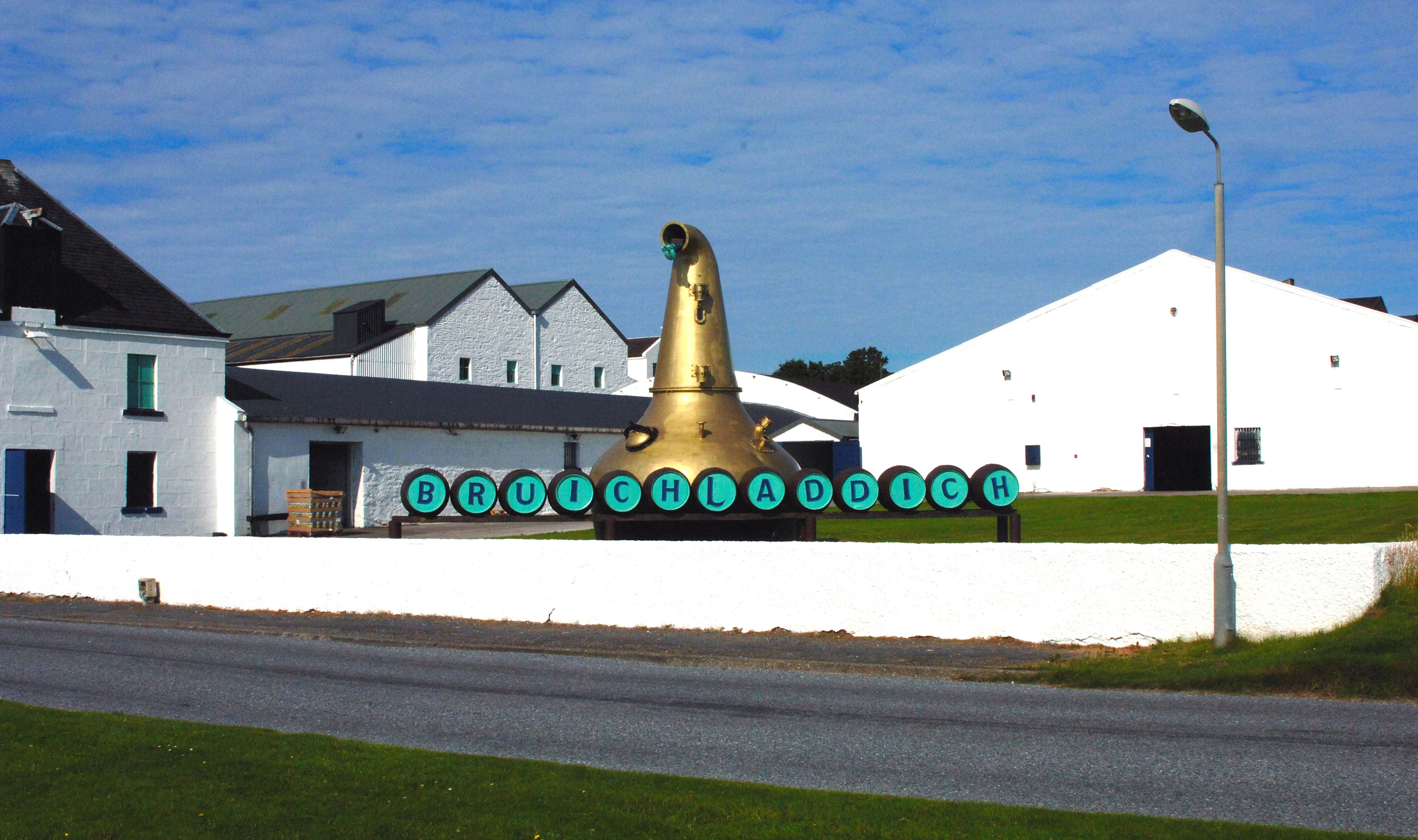

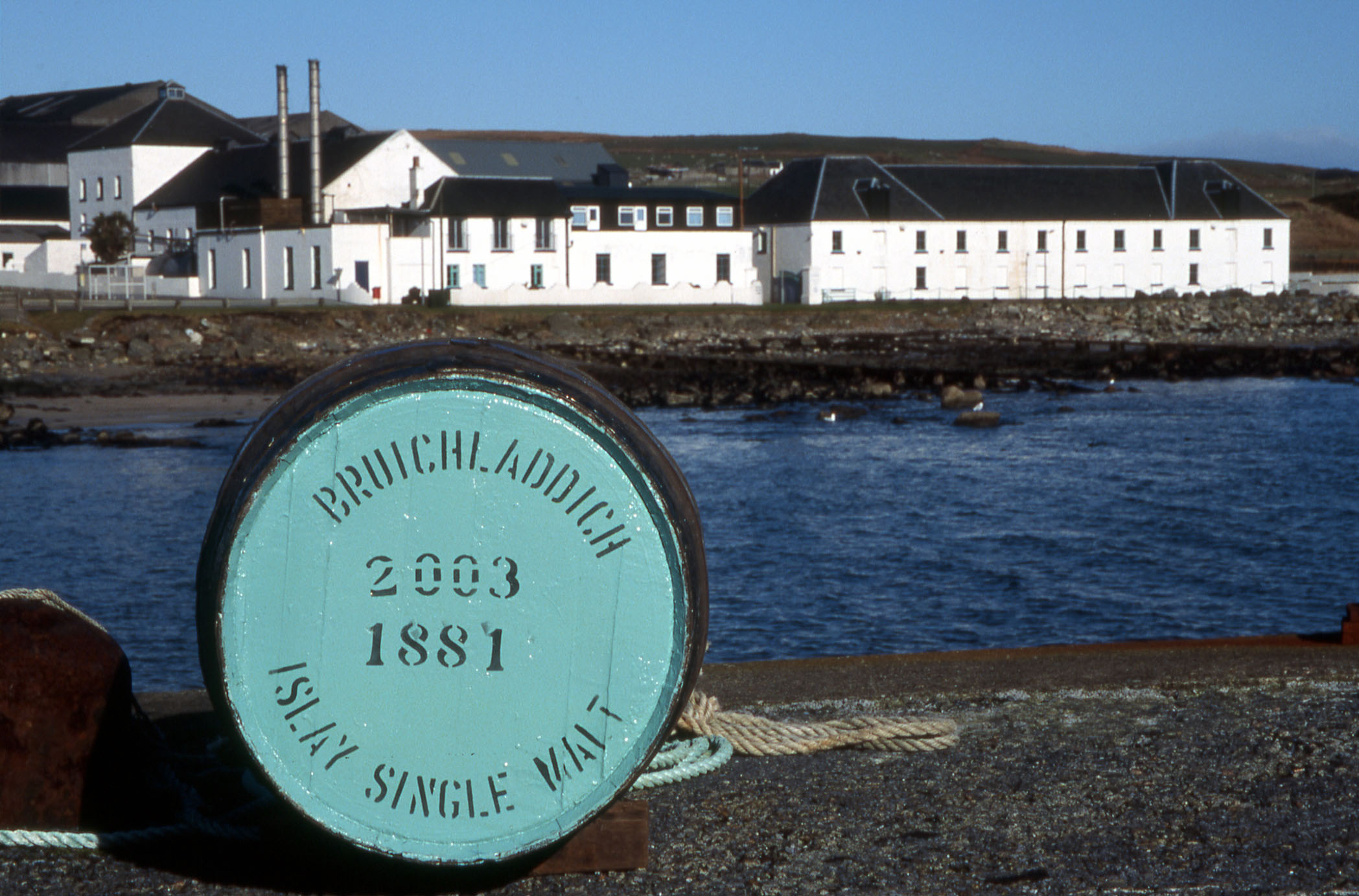

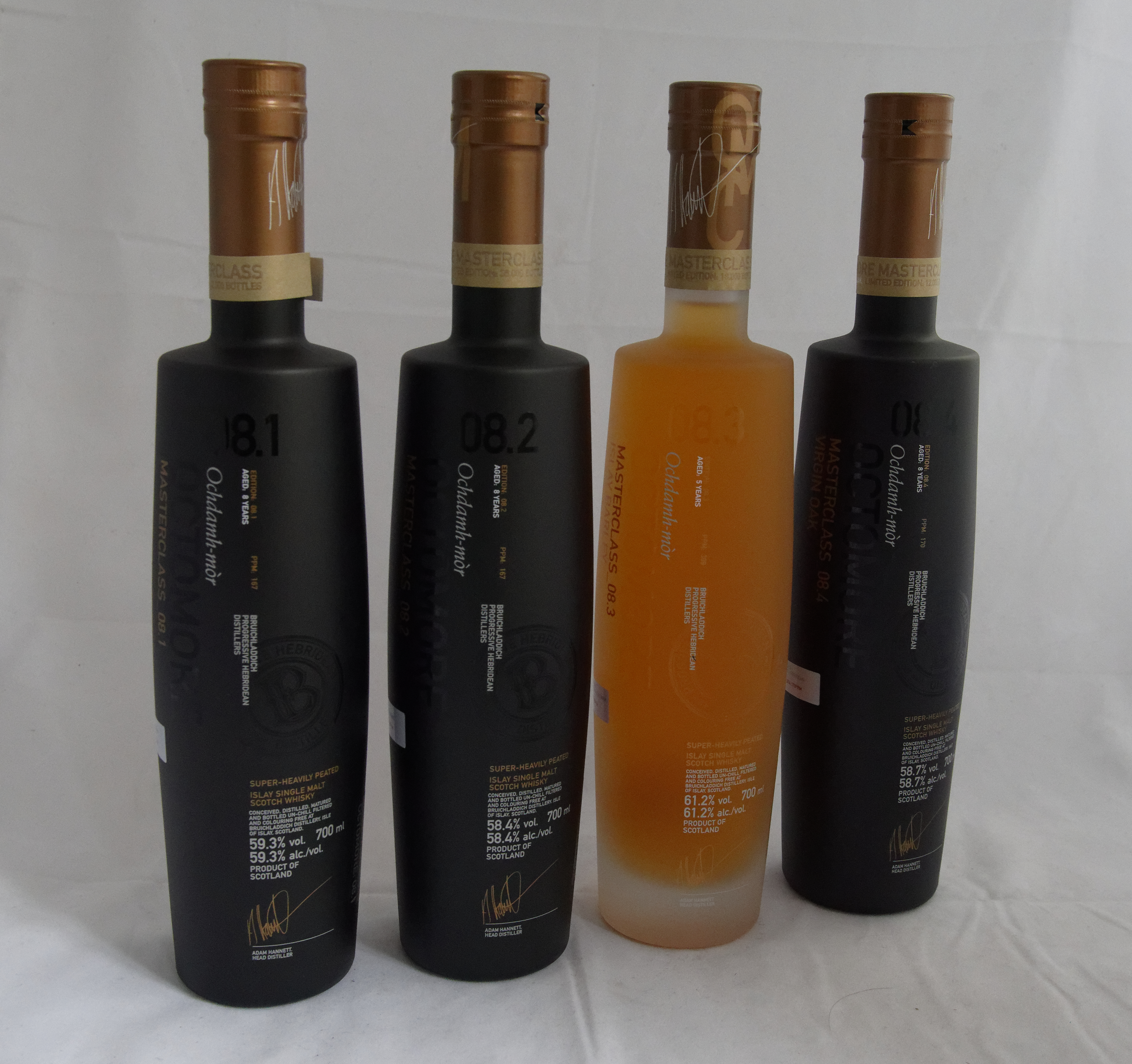
Octomore Masterclass

== In popular culture ==
- In the 1990 BBC television production of the political thriller House of Cards, Chief Whip Francis Urquhart offers reporter Mattie Storin a glass of Bruichladdich when she arrives for an interview, remarking, "Bruichladdich, if you know your malts."
- In the 2010 film Morning Glory, Harrison Ford's character Mike Pomeroy drinks Bruichladdich.
- In the 2011 film Carnage, directed by Roman Polanski, the two couples share a bottle of 18-year-old Bruichladdich.
- It was featured in an episode of the BBC2 series Oz and James Drink to Britain, in which they were given a tour of the distillery and allowed to try some of the prized 'X4', quadruple-distilled Perilous Whisky, of which Martin Martin wrote in 1695 "the first taste affects all the members of the body; two spoonfuls of this last liquor is a sufficient dose; and if any man exceed this, it would presently stop his breath, and endanger his life. The BBC presenters used the ultra pure spirit to run a Radical racing car.
- In The Gone-Away World by Nick Harkaway, Freeman ibn Solomon, the Ambassador representing the rebel guerrilla, Zaher Bey, drinks Bruichladdich single malt when he meets with the activist students at their campus bar hangout.
- In the 2018 documentary Scotch: A Golden Dream both Jim McEwan and the Bruichladdich Distillery are featured at length. The documentary covers McEwan's background, the scotch distilling process, history of how scotch came to be, and the revitalization of the Bruichladdich distillery.

== See also ==
- Islay whisky
- Whisky
- Scotch whisky
- List of whisky brands
- List of distilleries in Scotland
