= Spirits Europe =

spiritsEUROPE
- Formation: 1993, rebrand 2012
- Type: Trade association
- Legal status: International not-for-profit association
- Purpose: To represent spirits companies in Europe
- Location: Rue Belliard 12, 1040 Brussels, Belgium
- Region served: Europe
- Members: Spirits producers
- Main organ: General Assembly
- Staff: 7

spiritsEUROPE is a Belgium-based trade group that represents the interests of producers of spirits drinks at the EU level.

== History ==
The Brussels-based trade group spiritsEUROPE was created in 2012 from the merger of the European Spirits Organisation (CEPS) and The European Forum for Responsible Drinking (EFRD).

spiritsEUROPE, together with forty other stakeholders, was a founding member of the European Commission's Alcohol and Health Forum. The initiative was proposed by the European Commission as part of the EU strategy to support member states in reducing alcohol-related harm adopted in October 2006.

In 2023, as many new no- and low-alcohol spirits did not comply to regulations regarding the production of spirits, spiritsEUROPE published a guide to that effect.

== Activities ==
spiritsEUROPE represents the interests of the spirits sector from 31 national associations and 8 leading multinational companies including: Bacardi-Martini, Moët Hennessy, Diageo, Suntory Global Spirits, Campari Group, Pernod Ricard, Rémy Cointreau, Brown-Forman. The EU spirits industry represents over €26 billion in EU sales; 1 million jobs in production & sales; €21.4 billion of tax contribution and is the EU's largest agri-food exporter with €9.6 billion of exports.

spiritsEUROPE's goals include:

- Promote responsible consumption of alcoholic beverages (prevention campaigns, consumer information).
- Foster high level standards for marketing self-regulation (industry guidelines, online training for marketing professionals).
- Secure legislative conditions at EU level for the production, marketing, distribution and sale of spirits within the EU
- Enhance market access for EU spirits outside the EU
- Police discrimination between alcoholic beverages, including for taxation
- Inform on the economic contribution of the spirits industry to the EU (industry statistics, Ernst & Young data, publications, factsheets).

== Alcohol abuse prevention ==
In 2005, the Charter on Responsible Alcohol Consumption was adopted. The commitments included responsible drinking messages and codes of conduct on marketing of spirits drinks. EU spirits producers agreed to implement these commitments by the end of 2010. In October 2010, building on the experience of the 2005 Charter, spiritsEUROPE's members adopted a new series of commitments. The Road Map 2015: responsible drinking.eu included a new series of commitments on marketing self-regulation and promoting responsible drinking. As with the Charter, annual progress reports on implementation were published annually, with the final one being published early 2016.

== Prevention Campaigns in the EU ==
The spirits industry is committed to work with relevant stakeholders at national level to help reduce alcohol-related harm. “Drinks initiatives” are targeted initiatives undertaken by the spirits sector across the EU aimed at reducing alcohol-related harm in six areas:

1. Alcohol and minors: initiatives seek to discourage underage drinking by providing tools and supporting parents and teachers to engage with minors.
2. Drink-driving: initiatives aim to raise awareness of the dangers of drinking and driving.
3. Responsible service/selling: initiatives aim to raise knowledge and skills of those working in bars and shops on not selling to/serving underage or intoxicated people.
4. Consumer information: initiatives promote responsible drinking to adult consumers.
5. Workplace: initiatives range from the adoption and implementation of an alcohol policy at the work place, to information and education campaigns for employees, or support schemes for those with alcohol-related problems.
6. Non-commercial alcohol: initiatives to raise awareness of the negative consequences for personal health resulting from the consumption of non-commercial alcohol.

The details of the interventions can be accessed on the www.drinksinitiatives.eu database.

== See also ==
- Brewers of Europe
