= The Botanist =

Scottish dry gin

- Type: Gin
- Manufacturer: Bruichladdich
- Country of origin: Islay, Scotland
- Introduced: 2011
- Alcohol by volume: 46%
- Colour: Clear
- Flavour: 31 botanicals: 22 hand-foraged botanicals from the Isle of Islay and 9 core gin botanicals
- Website: The Botanist Islay Dry Gin

The Botanist is a dry gin made by the Bruichladdich Distillery in Islay, Scotland. It is one of two gins made on the island and is known for its hand-foraged botanicals. The name of the gin was inspired by two local botanists who helped develop the recipe for the gin alongside former Master Distiller, Jim McEwan. In 2024 it was ranked the seventh-bestselling brand of gin in the world by Drinks International.

== Distillation ==
The Botanist gin is distilled after an overnight maceration of nine base botanicals (the seed, berry, bark, root, and peel categories) in 100% wheat spirit and Islay spring water. The alcohol vapor infusion from the distillation then passes through a botanical basket containing the collected leaves and petals. This double infusion gives the Botanist gin its distinct flavor.

The Botanist is slow distilled in the Lomond still "Ugly Betty," one of the last in existence. The distillation takes 17 hours.

=== Ugly Betty ===
Developed after World War II, to meet the growing demand for single malt whiskies, the Lomond still was an experimental design that crossed a column and a pot still. It was created in 1955 by chemical engineer, Alistair Cunningham, and draftsman, Arthur Warren, to be a "one-stop-shop" with the ability to make a variety of whiskies.

Tom Morton described Ugly Betty in his book Spirit of Adventure as "An over-sized, upside-down dustbin made of copper."

== Ingredients ==
Two types of juniper are used, including prostrate juniper (Juniperus communis subspecies) which grows in the exposed sea level habitats of the Rhinns of Islay. Only a symbolic amount of Juniperus communis is added.

The Islay spring water, from which this gin is made, comes from "Dirty Dottie’s spring" on Octomore farm. It is used for the distillation and the bottling.

The gin is influenced exclusively by the foraged botanicals; no other essences, oils, or flavorings are added. The use of aromatic plants for flavouring spirit is not new. Islay’s distillers traditionally used whatever was at hand to improve their usquebaugh (whisky), distilled on small, portable stills that were hidden in remote glens.

=== Botanicals ===
- Angelica root *
- Apple Mint
- Birch leaves
- Bog Myrtle leaves
- Cassia bark *
- Chamomile (sweet)
- Cinnamon bark *
- Coriander seed *
- Creeping Thistle flowers
- Elder flowers
- Gorse flowers
- Heather flowers
- Hawthorn flowers
- Juniper (prostrate) berries
- Juniper berries *
- Lady’s Bedstraw flowers
- Lemon Balm
- Lemon peel *
- Liquorice root *
- Meadow Sweet
- Orange peel *
- Orris root *
- Peppermint leaves
- Mugwort leaves
- Red Clover flowers
- Sweet Cicely leaves
- Tansy
- Thyme leaves
- Water Mint leaves
- White Clover
- Wood Sage leaves

(*) = non-Islay botanical

== Awards ==
The Botanist was awarded the Diamond prize at the Monaco Concours of the Femmes et Spiriteux du Monde in 2011.
