= Miltonduff distillery =

Coordinates: 57°37′25.37″N 3°22′9.42″W

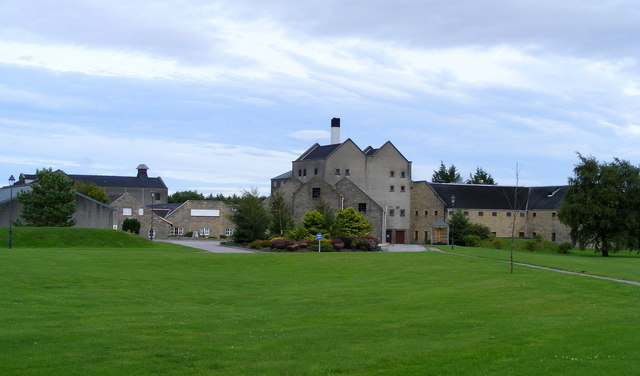
- The distillery in 2009

Region: Speyside
- Location: Near Elgin, Speyside
- Owner: Chivas Brothers (Pernod Ricard)
- Founded: 1824
- Water source: Local spring
- No. of stills: 3 wash stills (18,000 L); 3 spirit stills (18,000 L)
- Capacity: 5,800,000 L (1,300,000 imp gal; 1,500,000 US gal)

Miltonduff distillery is a Scotch whisky distillery located in Miltonduff six miles south-west of Elgin in the whisky region of Speyside.

== History ==
Miltonduff distillery site 'Milton' was said to have been chosen because of the good quality of the local water source under the ownership of Pluscarden Abbey; indeed, the distillery is the site of the Abbey's former mill. Milton became Miltonduff after the Duff family acquired the area and a distillery was built in 1824. In 1866, the distillery was acquired by William Stuart (owner of the Highland Park Distillery and he eventually entered into business with Thomas Yool in 1890, when the distillery was expanded and reached production of over one million litres of alcohol.

In 1936, Yool sold the distillery to Hiram Walker, which eventually passed in ownership to Allied Domecq. The distillery site was expanded with the construction of Allied Distillers' Malt Technical Centre, laboratory, engineering department and management offices. In 1960, the distillery was notable as the pioneer of a new method of heating the wash stills (through a series of heat exchanges and a diffuser). In 1987 the distillery was sold to Allied Domecq.

In 2005, Pernod Ricard bought Allied Domecq and put the distillery under their subsidiary Chivas Brothers.

In May 2022, Chivas Brothers announced that £88 million would be invested in the expansion of the Miltonduff distillery (together with Aberlour distillery). This is to include newer energy efficient production methods, incorporating Mechanical Vapour Recompression (MVR) fan technology. The new sustainable distillery is to be built adjacent to the current distillery by 2025.

== Facilities ==
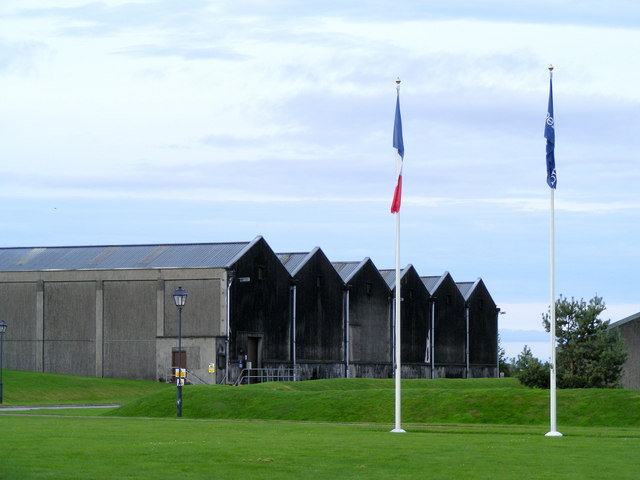
Bonded Warehouses at Miltonduff distillery seen in 2009

The distillery has six stills and several warehouses for storage.

== Products ==
The distillery has been a key production component of Ballantine's blended whisky since 1936. While much of the production of Miltonduff is used in blends, the distillery has produced a single malt since 1964 named 'Mosstowie'.
