= Rémy Cointreau =

French alcoholic beverage company

- Type: Public
- Traded as: Euronext Paris: RCO; CAC Mid 60 component
- Industry: Alcoholic beverages
- Founded: 1990; 36 years ago
- Headquarters: Cognac, France
- Key people: Marie-Amélie de Leusse (President)
- Products: Cognac; triple sec; rum; brandy; gin; liquor; whisky
- Brands: Rémy Martin
- Revenue: €1.2 billion (2023–2024)
- Net income: €284.8 million (2023–2024)
- Number of employees: 2021 (2023)
- Website: Remy-cointreau.com

Rémy Cointreau is a French, family-owned business group specialized in the production and distribution of alcoholic beverages. The group's products include cognac (Rémy Martin, Louis XIII), triple sec (Cointreau), the Greek spirit Metaxa, rum (Mount Gay), brandy (St-Rémy), gin (The Botanist) and whisky (Bruichladdich, Port Charlotte, Westland, Domaine des Hautes Alpes). The group, whose origins date back to 1724, was formed in 1990 after the merger of Rémy Martin and Cointreau. Rémy Cointreau also owns the fragrance company Maison Psyché.

== History ==
The cognac company Rémy Martin was created in 1724. It started international exports the following century and created the high-end cognac brand Louis XIII in 1874. Rémy Martin was bought in 1924 by André Renaud and launched the cognac brand VSOP Fine Champagne in 1927. In 1965, André Hériard Dubreuil (stepson of André Renaud) took over the direction of the company. He switched the group's focus on luxury brands, modernized its marketing, and developed its own international distribution network. During the 1980s, the group acquired Charles Heidsieck (1985), Piper-Heidsieck (1988), Mount Gay Rum (1989), and created the brand Passoã (1986). A joint-venture was launched in China to create the Dynasty Fine Wines Group, and another one in California to create Rémy Martin Schramsberg, the first Californian distillery since the Prohibition.

The Rémy Cointreau Group is a result of a 1990 merger between E. Rémy Martin & Cie SA and Cointreau & Cie SA, respectively. During the 1990s, the group divested a few brands including the champagne Krug. Rémy Cointreau created the international distribution network (outside the USA) Maxxium in 1999 with Highland and Jim Beam Brands and acquired the Bols group (Bols, Metaxa, Curaçao, Asbach Uralt) in 2000. The group left Maxxium in 2009 to create its own international distribution network. In 2011, it sold the champagnes Piper-Heidsieck and Charles Heidsieck to French luxury goods group EPI for 422 million euros.

Rémy Cointreau acquired the Bruichladdich Distillery Company (Bruichladdich, Port Charlotte, Octomore, The Botanist – B Corp certification in 2020) in 2012, The Westland Distillery (US) and the Domaine des Hautes Glaces (Alps, France) in 2017, and the cognac J.R. Brillet and the champagne Telmont in 2020, and divested Passoã the same year. In 2022, Rémy Cointreau created the fragrance company Maison Psyché, which uses spirits' aging methods to create high-end perfumes.

== Description ==
Rémy Cointreau is a French business group specialized in the production and distribution of alcoholic beverages. The group is based in Cognac, France. Its main shareholder is the Hériard Dubreuil family. It is indexed in the Euronext Paris as a CAC Mid 60 component.

Rémy Cointreau owns the following brands:

Brand	Year	Type
Rémy Martin	Launched in 1724	Cognac
Louis XIII	Launched in 1874	Cognac
St-Rémy	Launched in 1886	Brandy
Mount Gay Rum	Created in 1703 Acquired in 1989	Rum
Cointreau	Created in 1849 Merged in 1990	Triple sec
Metaxa	Created in 1888 Acquired in 2000	Muscat de Samos
Bruichladdich	Created in 1881 Relaunched in 2001 Acquired in 2012	Scotch Whisky
Port Charlotte	Created in 1829 Relaunched in 2001 Acquired in 2012	Scotch Whisky
The Botanist	Acquired in 2012	Gin
Westland	Acquired in 2017	American Whiskey
Domaine des Hautes Glaces	Acquired in 2017	French Whisky
J.R. Brillet (renamed Belle de Brillet)	Acquired in 2020	Liquor
Telmont	Acquired in 2020	Champagne

Rémy Cointreau also owns the high fragrance company Maison Psyché.
