= Australian Distilled Spirits Awards =

- Industry: Alcoholic beverage
- Headquarters: Melbourne, Australia
- Owner: Royal Agricultural Society of Victoria
- Website: www.rasv.com.au/Events/ADSA_Home/

Australian Distilled Spirits Awards (ADSA) is an annual competition that commenced in 2015.

The ADSA is managed by the Royal Agricultural Society of Victoria (RASV) in conjunction with the Australian Distillers Association. Judging of the awards is conducted at Melbourne Showgrounds, with the Awards presentation dinner held in March in Melbourne, Australia.

In 2017, the ADSA introduced two new trophies to reflect evolving production techniques, Champion Aromatic Bitters and Champion Micro Lot.

== Trophy winners ==
=== 2015 ===
- Best Australian Distiller - Lark Distillery (Tasmania)
- Champion Whisky - Limeburners Peated Single Malt Barrel M227 - Limeburners Distillery (Great Southern Distilling Company) (Western Australia)
- Champion Rum - Spike's Reserve - Hoochery Distillery (Western Australia)
- Champion Gin - The West Winds Gin - The Sabre - Tailor Made Spirits Company (Western Australia)
- Champion Alternative Spirits - Zeus Oyzo - Edgemill Group (Victoria)
- Champion Brandy - Black Bottle XO Brandy - VOK Beverages Pty Ltd (South Australia)
- Champion Liqueur - Pecan & Hazelnut Liqueur - Castle Glen Australia Pty Ltd (Queensland)

=== 2016 ===
- Champion Australian Distiller - Limeburners Distillery (Great Southern Distilling Company) (Western Australia)
- Champion Small Batch Distiller - Limeburners Distillery (Great Southern Distilling Company) (Western Australia)
- Champion Whisky - Limeburners Peated Single Malt Barrel M227 - Limeburners Distillery (Great Southern Distilling Company) (Western Australia)
- Champion Rum - Ord River Rum - Premium - Hoochery Distillery (Western Australia)
- Champion Gin - kis Old Tom - Kangaroo Island Spirits (South Australia)
- Champion Vodka - Pure No. 1 - Old Young's (Western Australia)
- Champion Brandy - St Agnes XO - St Agnes Distillery (South Australia)
- Champion Liqueur - Golden Knight Schnapps Liqueur - Castle Glen Australia Pty Ltd (Queensland)

== See also ==
- Alcohol in Australia
- Australian whisky
