= New world whisky =

Whisky produced in non-traditional countries

- Type: Distilled beverage
- Manufacturer: 30 Countries
- Origin: Global
- Introduced: 2021
- Variants: Single Malt Single cask Cask strength
- Related products: Non traditional producers: Australian whisky; English whisky; Finnish whisky; French whisky; German whisky; Taiwanese whisky; Welsh whisky; Non traditional whiskies: Scottish rye whisky; Irish rye whisky; American Single Malt

New world whisky is an emerging category of malt or grain whiskies that are either produced by countries not usually associated with whisky production, or not produced using traditional methods.

== Countries ==
Examples of countries that fall into this category include: Taiwan, Germany, France, Australia, Finland, England, Wales and Israel.

No	Brand	Distillery	Country	Citations
1.	Sullivans Cove, French Oak (Cask HH0525)	Sullivans Cove Distillery	Australia	
2.	Kavalan, Podium Single Malt Whisky	Kavalan Distillery	Taiwan	
3.	Kavalan, Reserved Rum Cask Single Malt Whisky	Kavalan Distillery	Taiwan	
4.	The Westfalian, Cask 120 Single Malt 2016	Northoff Feinbrennerei	Germany	
5.	Lark Distillery, Chinotto Cask Release Whisky	Lark Distillery	Tasmania	
6.	Spiritique, Amaethon Single Malt Whisky		France	
7.	Nantou Distillery, Omar Peated Single Malt Whisky Cask Strength Virgin Oak	Nantou Distillery	Taiwan	
8.	St Killan Distillers, Bud Spencer The Legend, Rauchig	St Killan Distillers	Germany	
9.	Starward, Ginger Beer Cask #6 Single Malt Whisky	Starward Distillery	Australia	
10.	Great Southern Distilling Company, Limeburners Single Malt Whisky, Directors Cut, Peated Sherry	Great Southern Distilling Company	Australia	
11.	Teerenpeli Brewery & Distillery, Portti Port Wood Finished Single Malt Whisky	Teerenpeli Brewery & Distillery	Finland	
12.	Slyrs Destillerie, Bavarian Single Malt Whisky Aged 12 Years	Slyrs Destillerie	Germany	
13.	Chateau De Breuil, Le Breuil Origine Single Malt	Chateau du Breuil	France	
14.	Lark Distillery, Cask Strength Single Malt Whisky	Lark distillery	Australia	
15.	Cotswolds Distillery, Sherry Cask Single Malt Whisky	Cotswolds Distillery	England	
16.	Slyrs Destillerie, Bavarian Single Malt Whisky Pedro Ximenez Cask Finish	Slyrs Destillerie	Germany	
17.	The Welsh Whisky Company, Penderyn Celt Single Malt Whisky	Penderyn distillery	Wales	
18.	The Spirit of Yorkshire Distillery, Filey Bay STR Finish	Spirit of Yorkshire distillery	England	
19.	Milk & Honey Distillery, Elements Red Wine Cask Single Malt Whisky	M&H Whisky distillery	Israel	

== Whiskies ==
Examples of whiskies that fall into this category include Scottish Rye Whisky, Irish Rye whisky and American Single malt whisky.

== Statistics ==
As of August 2022, there are currently over 30 countries which produce new world whiskies with the category growing by 8% in the years 2021 - 2022.

== Achievements ==
In 2014, Tasmania’s Sullivans Cove Distillery made history by becoming the first New World distillery to win the title of World’s Best Single Malt Whisky at the World Whiskies Awards, marking a significant milestone for New World whisky on the global stage, the distillery went on to win further global accolades, including World’s Best Single Cask Single Malt in both 2018, 2019 and 2026. On 21 February 2024 the Indian whisky Indri was named the "best New World whisky" at the VinePair awards.

== See also ==
Outline of whisky

List of whisky brands
