= Finnish whisky =

Finnish whisky was first distilled from 1981 to 2000 at the Koskenkorva alcohol distillery in Ilmajoki, Finland, run by the state-owned alcohol monopoly Alko (later Primalco, now Altia). After years of research and trials, the first brand to enter Finnish liquor stores was simply called Alko Whisky. In 1983 Alko introduced Viski 88 (later called Double Eight 88) that became the best-selling whisky in Finland and remained in production until the year 2000. A 10-year-old whisky was sold from 1991, until the company discontinued all whisky production in 2000.

The second coming for Finnish whisky took place on 8 November 2001 at Panimoravintola Beer Hunter's in the city of Pori. There are currently two operational distilleries in Finland, however, there is also a number of projects to bring forth many more in the future.

Kyrö and Teerenpeli whiskies were noted in the 2020 International Wine and Spirit Competition.

== Finnish distilleries ==
=== Panimoravintola Beer Hunter's ===
Panimoravintola Beer Hunter's was founded on 8 April 1998 in the city of Pori. First it served as a restaurant and a brewery. On 8 November 2001 at six PM, self-taught Mika Heikkinen began distilling the first batch of malt whisky produced in Finland. The first batch's casks are to be opened in 2034 when Mika Heikkinen turns 60 years of age. An auction of 100 bottles of Old Buck whisky from the second batch was held on 1 December 2004 and the rest was resealed back into the casks. Future batches will mainly be sold to wholesalers in hand blown bottles made by Estonian Tarbeklaas. The copper stills used by Beer Hunter's were manufactured by German Arnold Holstein and the casks used are old sherry casks from Spain and new ones from Portugal. In April 2004, Beer Hunter's had produced a total of 2000 liters of malt whisky. Beer Hunter's Old Buck second release was also chosen by Jim Murray as the "European Mainland Whisky of the Year" in his "Whisky Bible 2009". Murray describes the whisky as "pure bourbon: with the nose offering every degree of honeycomb-liquorice imaginable". According to Mika Heikkinen "If there was to be a page written about us, I do not know how we would be described. I feel that we can produce malt whisky like Glenfiddich without a smoky aroma, as well as Laphroaig style smoky whisky."

=== Teerenpeli Distillery and Brewery ===
Teerenpeli ("dalliance", literally: "black grouse play") started brewing beer in 1995 in the city of Lahti. The distillery begun its operations seven years later, in 2002. Teerenpeli Distillery is independent company owned by Mr and Mrs Anssi Pyysing. In 2008, Alko (Finnish national alcoholic beverage retailing monopoly) begun retail sales of their first entirely Finnish whisky: Teerenpeli Single Malt 5 yo. Teerenpeli Single Malt 5 yo is bottled at 43% alcohol by volume and the manufacturer describes its palette as vanilla with a fruity aroma. At 2009 was new release of 6 yo. Teerenpeli Single Malt. The bottle and the label were designed by Markus Pyörälä and Valtteri Vitakoski of Lahti University of Applied Sciences's Institute of Design. Teerenpeli Single Malt is distilled with entirely Finnish malted barley from the Finnish malter Viking Malt and with fresh groundwater from the Salpausselkä ridge.

=== Panimoravintola Koulu ===
Panimoravintola Koulu in Turku has been mainly focused on beer and brewing, but as of spring 2013 they now offer their own three-year-old single malt whisky. The whisky was named "Sgoil" after the Gaelic word for school and it is partly produced on site and partly in Tuorla, Kaarina. The malt is processed at the in house brewery, but it is then distilled at Tuorla as Panimoravintola Koulu does not house a still. The whisky was distilled in the autumn of 2009 and it is already sold at Panimoravintola Koulu, but the supply is limited (one cask of 150 liters) as the Tuorla facilities are currently undergoing renovation. Most of the first whisky batch is still maturing in old Jack Daniel's bourbon casks and there are plans for many future whisky editions.

=== Kyrö Distillery Company ===
Kyrö Distillery Company started distilling rye whisky in April 2014 at the old dairy of Isokyrö. According to the CEO Miika Lipiäinen, their goal is to distill delicious rye whisky and make the distillery into the world's most renown rye whisky distillery in 5 to 10 years. They plan to produce 20 000 litres of whisky a year and to distinguish themselves from other rye whisky distillers by using pure rye malts instead of mixing in corn. The first batch will become available after it has matured for three years, in 2017. They'll use 16, 32 and 62 liter New American Oak casks for maturing the malted rye whisky.

== See also ==
- List of whisky brands
- Outline of whisky
- New world whisky
