= Hoochery Distillery =

Microdistillery in Western Australia

- Company type: Private
- Industry: Manufacturing of distilled spirits
- Founded: 1995; 31 years ago
- Founder: Raymond Bernard Dessert III
- Headquarters: Kununurra, Western Australia, Australia
- Products: Distilled spirits
- Website: www.hoochery.com.au

Hoochery Distillery is a farm-based microdistillery located in Kununurra, Western Australia, founded by Raymond Bernard "Spike" Dessert III. The distillery produces approximately 50,000 gallons of rum annually, and also produces gin, whiskey and liqueurs. It is the oldest continually operating legal distillery in Western Australia.

== History ==
Raymond Bernard "Spike" Dessert III founded the farm business R.B. Dessert Seed Co. in 1986. To diversify, he opened the Hoochery Distillery in 1995, producing rums. Dessert died in December 2017. Dessert's daughter, Kalyn Fletcher, now runs the company.

== Production ==
Hoochery rums are produced from local sugar cane and molasses. These are vat-fermented on-site and distilled in a hand-built pot still. The distillate is aged for two to 15 years in re-charred oak barrels. The distillery's flagship Ord River Rum was first sold in 1999. A range of 7, 10, and 15-year rums debuted in 2018 named "Spike's Reserve" in honor of Dessert.

== Awards and recognition ==
- 2015 Australian Distilled Spirits Awards
  - Spike's Reserve Dark Rum - Champion Rum
  - 1 Silver medal and 3 Bronze medals
- 2016 San Francisco World Spirits Competition
  - Ord River 10-Year-Old Spike's Reserve Rum - Extra-Aged Rum, Double Gold Medal
  - 1 Silver Medal

In 2019, the Australian Distilled Spirits Awards created the Raymond B "Spike" Dessert III Trophy for Champion Rum in Dessert's memory. The Hoochery's Ord River Rum Single Barrel Selection won the inaugural award, as well as the gold medal for Dark Overproof Rum. In April 2022, Dessert was inducted in the inaugural class of the Australian Distillers Hall of Fame.

In May 2023, the distillery won the best Australian rum at industry awards.

== See also ==
- List of rum producers
- Australian whisky
