= German whisky =

German beverage

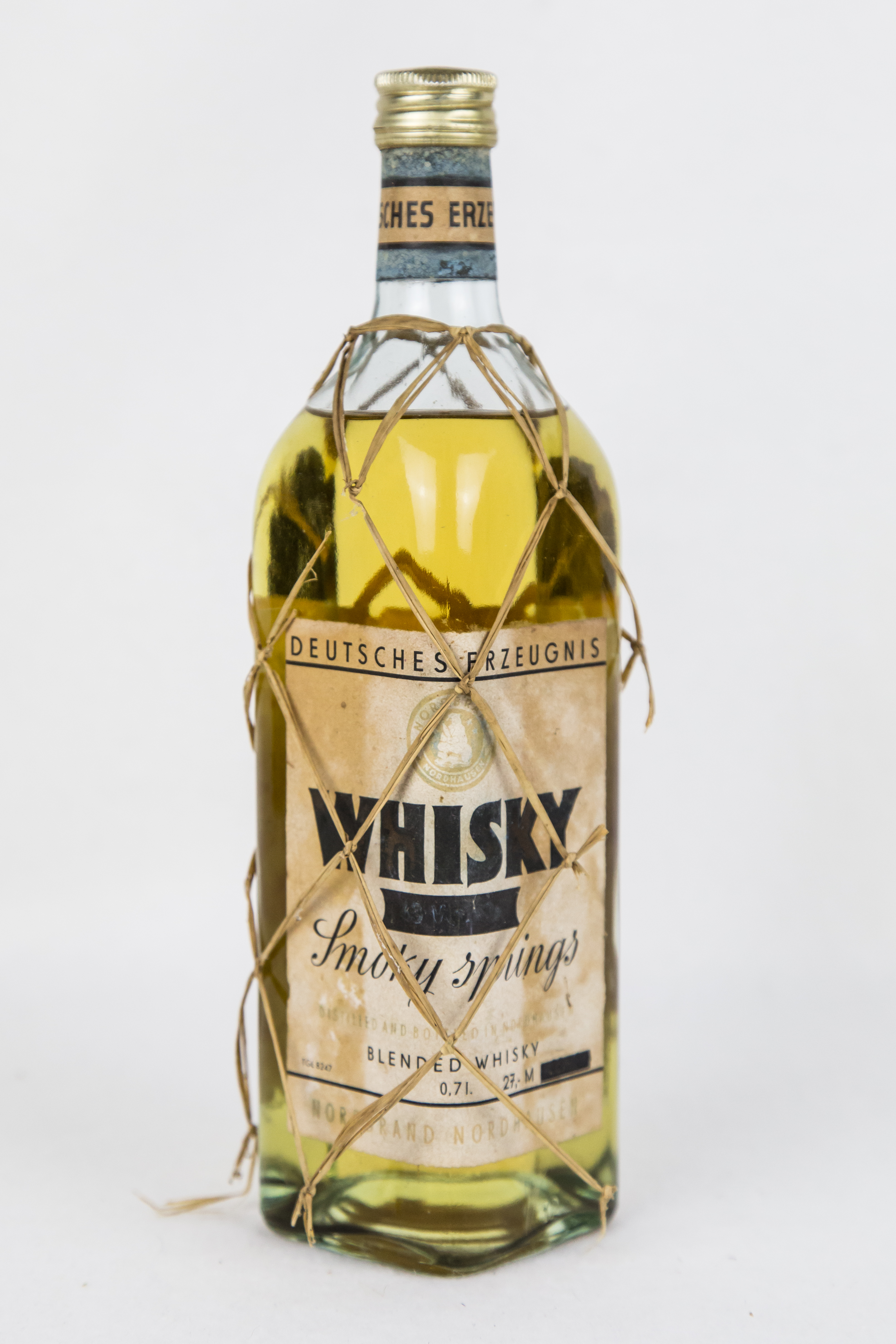
A bottle of German whisky

German whisky is a distilled beverage produced in Germany made from grains traditionally associated with the production of whisky. The distillation of German-made whisky is a relatively recent phenomenon having only started in the last 30 years. The styles produced resemble those made in Ireland, Scotland and the United States: single malts, blends, and bourbon styles. There is no standard spelling of German whiskies with distilleries using both "whisky" and "whiskey", and one even using "Whesskey", a play on the word whisky and Hessen, the state in which it is produced. There are currently 23 distilleries in Germany producing whisky.

== German distilleries ==
=== Bayerwald-Bärwurzerei Spezialitäten-Brennerei Gerhard Liebl ===
Award-winning distillery from the Bavarian Forest. On Destillata 2011, Liebl earned Silver and three times Gold for their Coillmór Bavarian Single Malt Whisky (Gold: Port Single-cask 46%, American Oak 43%, French Oak & Sherry Single-Cask 46%; Silver: Sherry Single-Cask 46%).

=== Black Forest – Rothaus ===
The mash for this whisky is produced in the Rothaus State Brewery of Baden in the heart of the Black Forest. The brewery was founded on the site of a Benedictine monastery in 1791. The mash is then transferred to Karlsruhe, to the distillery Kammer-Kirsch GmbH for distillation. The distillery was founded in 1909 as the test distillery for the state of Baden, with the primary objective of producing a high quality Kirschwasser. The whisky is distilled twice and stored mainly in bourbon casks with some finishing for special bottlings. The main batches are released yearly on 16 March – the birthday of the Rothaus master brewer, Max Sachs. Distillery Kammer received the award "Germany's Best Whisky Distillery 2011", "Germany's Best Whisky Distillery 2012" and a silver medal at the IWSC 2013 for the product.

=== Blackwood ===
The Blackwood distillery Seeger in Calw-Holzbronn has been producing whisky using wheat since the 1980s. A 12-year-old filling is planned. The whisky and the fruit brandies with which the distillery began is well known in a wider area around southern Germany.

=== Blaue Maus ===
In 1980 Robert Fleischmann founded the Blaue Maus Distillery (blue mouse) to produce brandy wine on the site of a grocery and tobacco shop that was owned by his family. He made his first attempt at making whisky, a pure single malt, three years later. After many attempts at perfecting the art he sold his first whisky in 1996 and four years later his son Thomas and wife Petra took over the operations. The distillery offers five different brands of whisky.

=== finch® Whiskydestillerie ===
The finch® Whiskydistillery was founded in 1999 and their home is the Swabian Alb, at over 700 metres (2,300 ft) above sea level. The special climate of this unique natural landscape produces exceptional qualities in the home grown grain of the finch® Whiskydistillery. In one of the largest pot still distilleries in Germany, the grain brought in is carefully processed and distilled to the finest distillate. Nearly 6,000 barrels are in the warehouses. Most of the 14 whiskies of the brand finch® Schwäbischer Hochland Whisky are from 8 years to 12 years old, and therefore finch® Whiskydestillerie has the largest stock of long matured whiskies in Germany. Three of the finch® whiskies won the gold medal and the title category winner at the World Whiskies Awards 2024.

=== Hammerschmiede / The Glen Els ===
The Hammerschmiede (in English: hammer forge) is a whisky manufacturer founded in 1985 in Zorge (Harz Mountains/Lower-Saxony) in the heart of Germany. The single malt which is distilled in the Hammerschmiede is called The Glen Els. The Harz Mountain Single Malt matures in different casks, like sherry-, marsala- or madeira-casks. The old warehouse of the Hammerschmiede was built between 1250 and 1270 in a late romanesque, early gothic style. About 600 casks are in stock today and the annual production capacity is at about 30,000 bottles. The most popular release is called The Journey and was awarded by Jim Murray with a Liquid Gold Award in 2014. Other popular releases can be also found under the second brand name The Alrik. An unusual fact is that sometimes woodsmoked malt is used for the production.

=== Höhler ===
The Höhler Distillery was founded in 1895 as a maker of fruit brandy. The present owner is a fourth generation member of the family, Holger Höhler. In 2001 he started turning out small batches of whisky using a recipe consisting of corn, wheat and rye. These whiskies are aged for a three-year period and when bottled sell out quickly. The whiskies produced have been in the style of Irish, Scotch single malt, rye and bourbon. The whiskies are spelled "Whesskey" as a play on the word whisky and Hesse, the state in which the distillery is located.

=== Rabel Berghof ===
Rabel Berghof in Owen produces many fruit brandies. Several years ago, they started the production of a single grain whisky using wheat, known as Schwäbischer Whisky (Swabian Whisky).

=== Schlitzer Destillerie ===
The Schlitzer Destillerie in Schlitz (Hesse) has produced spirits and liqueurs since 1585 and is the oldest functioning distillery in Germany. In 2013 the 14-year-old Glen Slitisa Single Malt Wheat Whisky was awarded third place at the trade fair InterWhisky in Frankfurt.

=== Slyrs ===
The Slyrs Distillery was founded in 1999. It produces Slyrs Bavarian Single Malt. This whisky is aged for three years in new, unused American white oak barrels with a 50-US-gallon (190 L) capacity. Beginning in 2015, the company offered a 12 year old single malt.

=== St. Kilian Distillers ===
The St. Kilian Distillers was founded in 2014. They use two 6,000-litre pot stills and produce close to 200,000 litres per year. White Dog won the "World's Best White Dog" award in 2018.

== See also ==
- List of whiskey brands
- Outline of whisky
- New world whisky
