= Welsh whisky =

Whisky distilled in Wales

- Type: Distilled beverage
- Origin: Wales
- Alcohol by volume: 40% – 63.2%
- Colour: Caramel
- Ingredients: Malt, Water, Grains
- Variants: Single malt, Single cask, Small batch, Blended whisky
- Related products: Scotch whisky; English whisky; Irish whiskey

Welsh whisky (Welsh: wisgi Cymreig or chwisgi Cymreig) is liquor made from malt, grain and water that is produced in Wales from Welsh ingredients and contains two types: malt whisky and grain whisky.

Commercial whisky production in Wales has been discontinuous over the years, but there are currently six distilleries in Wales.

== History ==
=== Origins ===
Wales has a long history of alcohol production, but distillation appears not to have begun until the Middle Ages. There are claims that the first evidence of stills in Wales dates to the 4th century CE, and that "The Great Welsh Warrior" Reaullt Hir is said to have distilled chwisgi from braggot brewed by the monks of Bardsey Island in 356 CE. These monks then allegedly developed the art of distilling further. However, the name "Reaullt" is a High Medieval loanword from Anglo-Norman French and would not have been used before the 11th century CE, making this claim of whisky-making on Bardsey Island in the 4th century unlikely.

Fermentation but not distillation is mentioned in the medieval Welsh stories of The Mabinogion, which dates from the 12th–13th centuries and is based on earlier oral traditions. A 16th century manuscript of the also much earlier 6th century Tales of Taliesin mentions distillation at the end of its "Mead Song", although mead is a fermented beverage.

=== Decline ===
The manufacture of whisky in Wales declined during the 19th century, with the commercial development of liquor discouraged by the rise of the temperance movement. The last notable distillery – The Welsh Whisky Distillery Company – was established by R. J. Lloyd Price in 1887 at Frongoch. However, the company was not a success. It was sold in 1900 to William Owen of Bala for £5000, and liquidated in 1910.

=== Revival ===
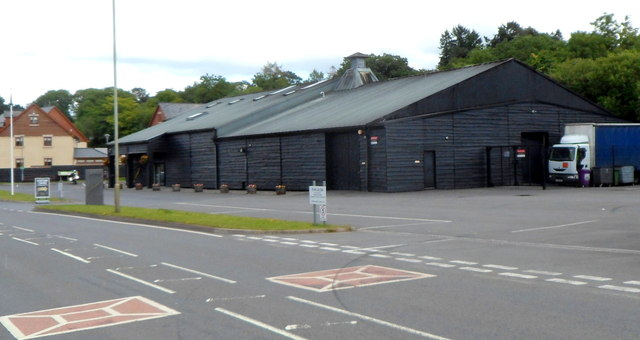
Penderyn Distillery

Entrepreneurs attempted to revive distillation in the country in the 1990s. The first attempts entailed bottling Scottish blends in Wales as "Welsh whisky", but a lawsuit by Scotch distillers ended the enterprise. In 2000 The Welsh Whisky Company – now known as Penderyn – was founded, with a distillery built at Penderyn in the Brecon Beacons National Park. Production commenced in 2000 and the finished product went on sale in 2004, the first whisky commercially produced in Wales for a century. This was followed in 2016 by Dà Mhìle distillery near Llandysul in west Wales bottling its first whisky, an organic single grain whisky.

In 2017, with two distilleries actively making and marketing whisky, Wales was officially recognised as having a whisky industry under European Union legislation. By February 2020 two more distilleries had begun operations: the Aber Falls distillery in Abergwyngregyn, Gwynedd commenced production in late 2017 and released its first whisky in 2021 after delaying the launch due to coronavirus; and in 2020 the Coles distillery produced the third single malt whisky in Wales at Llanddarog in Carmarthenshire, making it the fourth distillery to begin production and the third to release whisky onto the market.

As of July 2023 Welsh whisky was available in 45 countries, with the total value of exports forecast to be £23m that year.

== Definition ==
In August 2021 a group of Welsh distillers submitted an application for a geographical indication (GI) for Welsh whisky, which was granted by the Department for Environment Food and Rural Affairs on 24 July 2023.

In order for whiskies to be branded as Welsh whisky they must comply with three legally set criteria: they must be made using 100% Welsh malted barley; they must use water of 100% Welsh origin; and they must be produced in Wales at all stages from brewing to bottling.

== Current distilleries ==
As of December 2022 there were six whisky distilleries across Wales.

- Aber Falls distillery in Abergwyngregyn, Gwynedd; began production in 2017 and released its first whisky on 17 May 2021.
- Anglesey Môn distillery near Pentraeth on Anglesey; established in 2018.
- Coles distillery in the village of Llanddarog in the Carmarthenshire countryside; also produces gin and vodka.
- Dà Mhìle distillery; produced its first organic single malt in 2012; the name is Scottish Gaelic and translates as "two thousand"..
- 'In the Welsh Wind' distillery in Tan-y-groes, Ceredigion; founded in January 2018; in 2021 it received permission to extend and develop the existing building and to construct a cask and grain store, allowing it to complete all the steps of whisky production.
- Penderyn distillery in Penderyn, Rhondda Cynon Taf; established in 2000, the first commercial distillery operating in Wales since the 19th century; formerly The Welsh Whisky Company.

== Brands ==
List of brands
No.	Brand	No. of releases	Examples
1.	Penderyn	341	Penderyn Madeira Single Malt Whisky; Penderyn Celt Single Malt Whisky; Penderyn Single Cask Malt Whisky
2.	Dà Mhìle	20	Dà Mhìle Single Grain Welsh Whisky 2022
3.	Aber Falls Distillery	12	Aber Falls Inaugural Release 2021 Single Malt Whisky; Aber Falls Single Malt Whisky Distillers Cut 2021; Aber Falls Limited Edition ‘Manzanilla’ Single Malt
4.	In The Welsh Wind	2	Palo Cortado Cask; Rum Cask

== Achievements ==
On 5 July 2016 two bottles from The Welsh Whisky Distillery Company (Note: The Welsh Whisky Company Distillery has been renamed the Penderyn distillery) that dated from the 1900s were sold to a private bidder for a combined total of £14,500.

== See also ==
- Economy of Wales
- Food and drink industry of Wales
- Outline of whisky
- List of whisky brands
- List of British Standards
- New world whisky
