= French whisky =

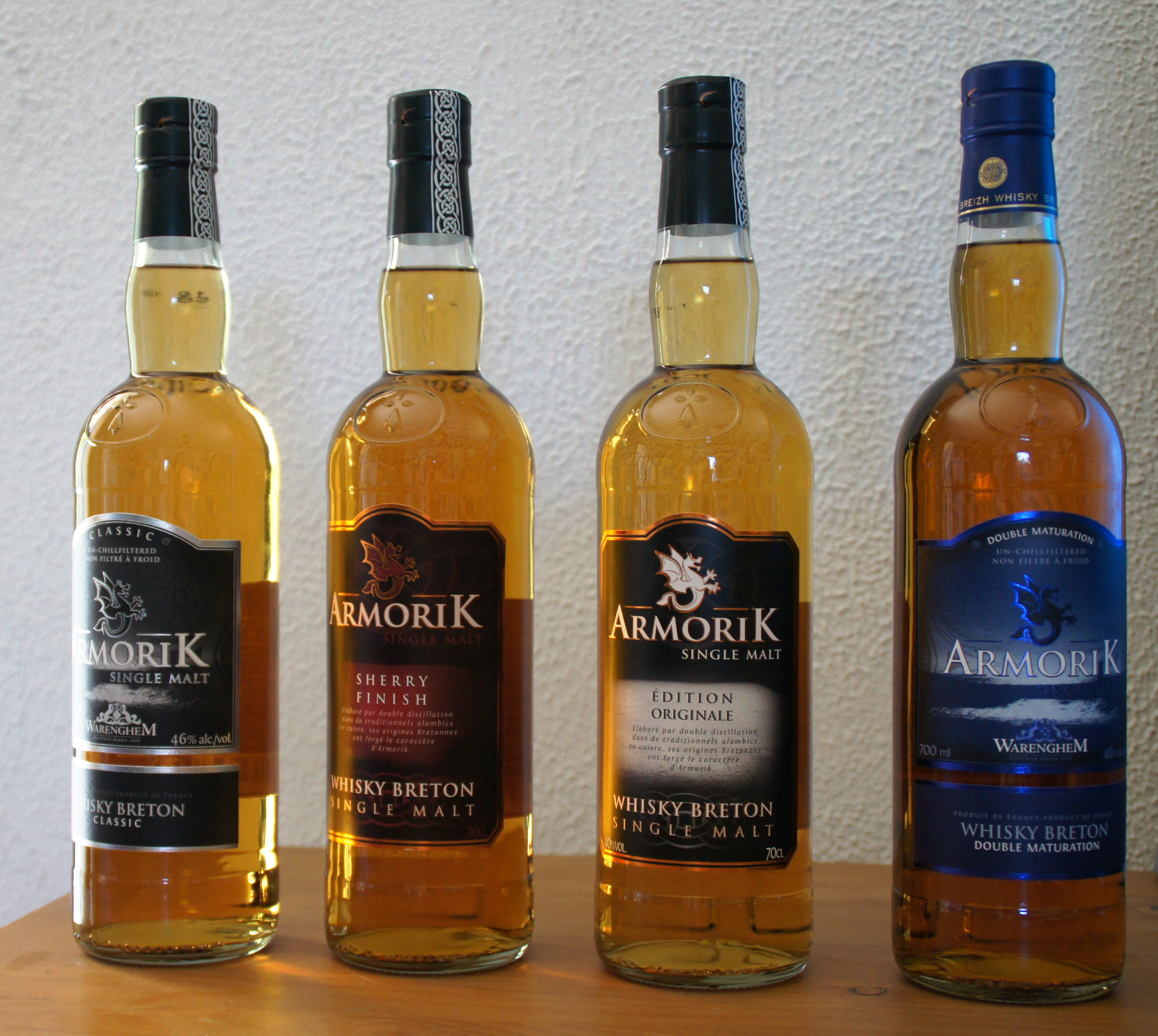
- Single malt whiskys from Warenghem Distillery
- Type: Distilled beverage
- Origin: France
- Introduced: 20th century (active: 43 years)
- Ingredients: Malt, water
- Related products: Scottish

French whisky is whisky produced in France.

== History ==
In France, the 24 January 1713 royal decree forbid producing spirits from any other fruit or grain than raisin to protect its economy against the burgeoning molasses trade.

The first brand of French whisky appeared much later, in 1983 in Brittany, with the launch of the Warenghem Distillery. This Briton whisky started distribution in French stores in 1987, and launched the first French single malt (Armorik) in 1998.

The number of French whisky distilleries went from a dozen in the early 2010s to 130 in 2025. This wave of newborn distilleries is considered the second generation of French whisky distillers. The whiskies produced in Brittany ("Whisky breton" or "Whisky de Bretagne", including blends) and in Alsace ("Whisky alsacien" or "Whisky d'Alsace", single malts only) obtained an Indication Géographique Protégée in 2015. In 2018, Système U was the first French chain of supermarkets to launch its own private label brand of French single malt whisky (produced in Alsace). Lidl and Aldi Nord followed suit a few years later.

In the early 2020s, France was the second-largest market for imported Scottish whisky by volume, but the rise of quality French whisky led Scottish Development International to muscle up its lobbying in France to safeguard its market shares.

== Description ==
There were 130 whisky distilleries in operation in France in 2023 (52 in 2018, 5 in 2004). Distilleries producing French whisky include the Celtic Whisky Distillerie, La Distillerie des Menhirs, and Warenghem in Brittany; Meyer and J. Bertrand, Hepp, and Lehmann in Alsace; and Grallet-Dupic and Rozelieures in Lorraine. 800,000 bottles of French whisky were sold in 2016.

The Fédération française de whisky was created in 2016 to represent the commercial interests of the French producers of whisky. In 2025, with 2.5 liters consumed each year, the French were found to be number one consumers of whisky worldwide (Bonial 2025).

== See also ==
- French cuisine
- List of whisky brands
- New world whisky
