= Kyrö Napue Gin =

Finnish gin

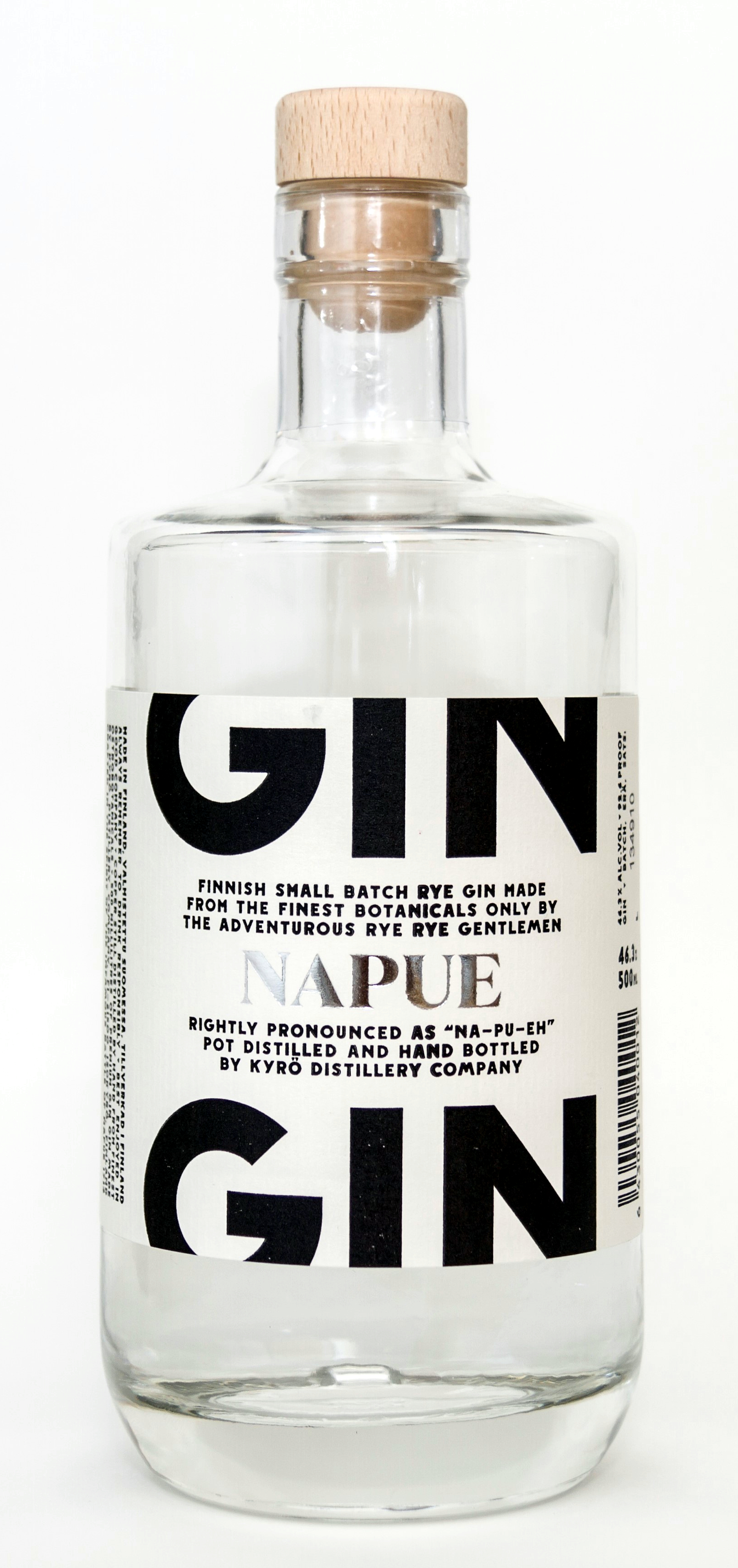
A bottle of Napue Gin.

Kyrö Napue Gin (known as Napue until 2020) is a rye gin produced by the Finnish distillery Kyrö Distillery Company. It was renamed Kyrö Napue Gin in January 2020. Kyrö Napue Gin is made of rye along with 16 different herbs, including cranberry, sea buckthorn, spruce leaves and meadowsweet.

In 2015, Kyrö Napue Gin was elected the best gin in the Gin & Tonic category at the International Wine and Spirit Competition in the United Kingdom. Gin and tonic made of Kyrö Napue Gin is decorated with cranberry and rosemary. The drink is named after the Battle of Napue fought in the village of Napue in Finland's Isokyrö in 1714.

== Packaging ==
The Kyrö Napue Gin bottle is a cylinder-shaped glass bottle with a paper label and a wooden cork. As well as the product itself, is packaging has attracted international attention. Kyrö Distillery Company was placed among the best applicants at the Cannes Lions Premium Packaging series and was placed second in the Dieline contest in the Spirits category. In 2018 Kyrö introduced new glass bottles designed by Mikko Laaksonen. The new design is very similar to the old bottle designed by an Italian family company. An incline at the bottom of the new bottle makes the bottle appear to float on top of the table. The new bottle has broader shoulders, is rounder, and has a shorter neck compared to the old bottle. The new bottle has the word "Kyrö" at the bottom.
