= Dà Mhìle Distillery =

Welsh whisky distillery

Dà Mhìle
Region: Wales
- Location: Llandysul, Ceredigion
- Status: Active
- Website: damhile.co.uk

Da Mhile Springbank
- Type: Single Malt
- Cask type(s): Sherry, Oloroso
- ABV: 46

Da Mhile Loch Lomond
- Type: Single Malt
- Cask type(s): Sherry, Oloroso
- ABV: 46

Da Mhile Tarian
- Type: Single Malt
- Cask type(s): Sherry, Oloroso
- ABV: 46

Dà Mhìle is a Welsh whisky distillery. It was the second to produce producing commercially available whisky made in Wales since the 19th century, and its existence allowed the European Union to designate Wales as a whisky-producing country. The distillery's first whisky was commissioned to Springbank in 1992, and the second in 2000 to Loch Lomond.

In 2012 the distillery opened on the site of the Glynhynod Farm, Ceredigion by First Minister for Wales Carwyn Jones.

== Background and products ==
The distillery is set on the Glynhynod Farm, initially setup as a cheese producing farm.

The name of the distillery, Dà Mhìle, translates to 'two thousand' in Scottish Gaelic (Dwy fil in Welsh) marked by the date of the first whisky commissioned.

The first Welsh release whisky, aged in Oloroso sherry casks, is named "Tarian" after Chris Phillips, one of the first patrons.

The distillery also produces organic spirits including liqueurs, rum, apple brandy, and seaweed gin.
