= Slyrs =

Distillery in Germany

Coordinates: 47°42′09″N 11°53′08″E

- Location: Bayrischzeller Straße 13; 83727 Schliersee; Germany
- Owner: Slyrs Destillerie GmbH & Co. KG
- Founded: 1999
- Status: Active

Slyrs
- Type: Single Malt Bavarian whisky

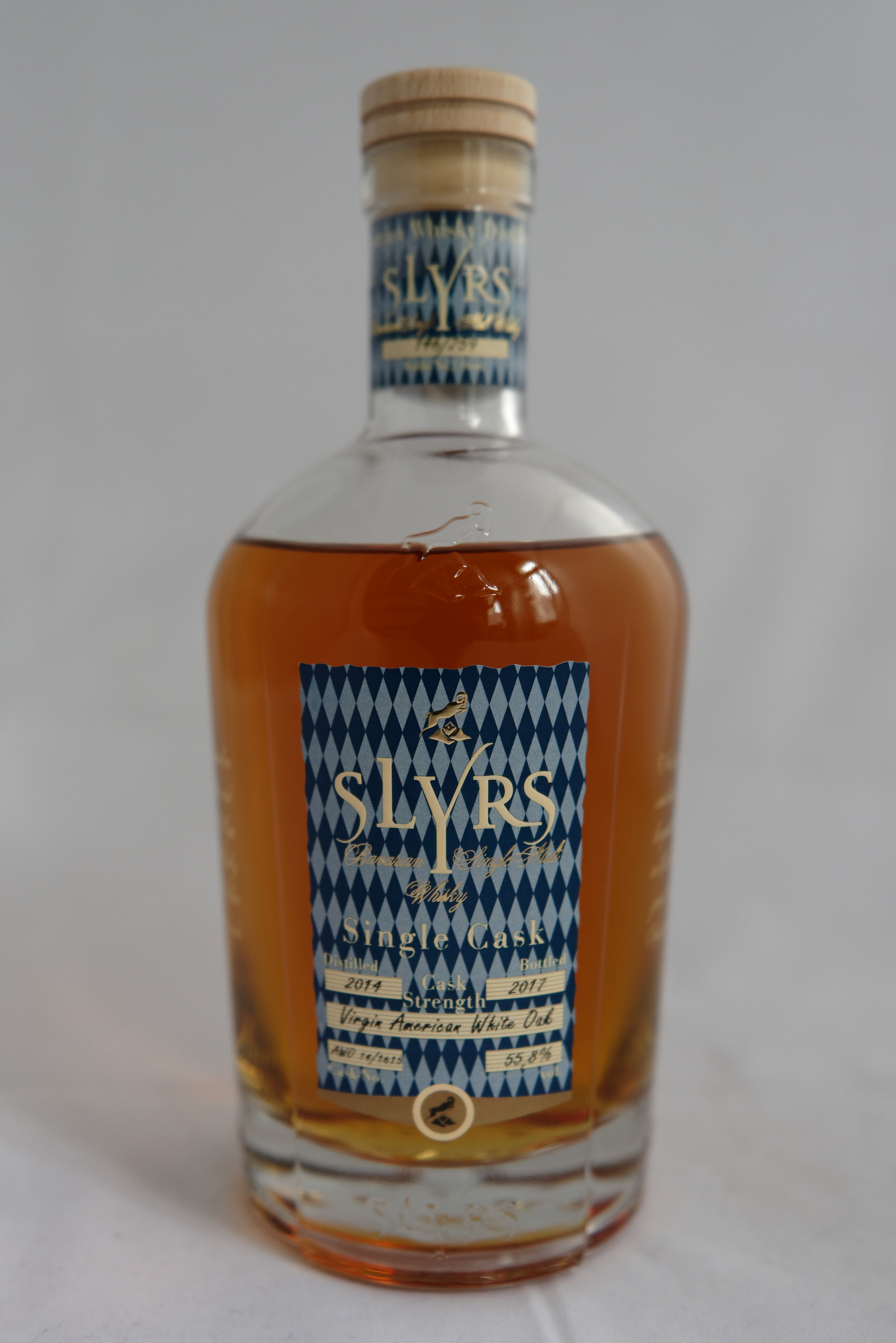
Slyrs Single Cask, 55,8 vol, 3 Jahre

Slyrs (German pronunciation: [ˈʃliːɐ̯s]) is a German whisky distillery in Schliersee, a small town in the Oberbayern region of Bavaria. The distillery is controlled by the Stetter family, which also operates a schnapps distillery previously used to distill Slyrs whisky.

According to Andrea Stetter, one of Slyrs' managing directors, Slyrs whisky is fundamentally different from Scotch, with "... a mild, fruity taste ...", and "... can be drunk as soon as it is three years old."

== Name ==
The name Slyrs is derived from Slyrse, the old Bavarian name for the Schliersee and the monastery of the same name.

== History ==
The distillery in the district of Neuhaus was founded in 1999 by Florian Stetter, who trained as a brewer and maltster.

Since whiskey has to be stored by law for three years and the production quantities are comparatively small anyway, only a limited edition of 100,000 bottles was initially sold and then distributed locally. In 2011, between 40,000 and 50,000 people visited the distillery. As of 2011, the whisky distillery was the largest in Germany.

In December 2014, a newly built warehouse was inaugurated on the Stümpfling mountain at an altitude of 1501 meters, which can hold up to 40 barrels of 225 liters each. Under the special climatic conditions, the whiskey stored here should develop a different taste than that stored in the valley.

== Awards ==
Slyrs' Sherry Edition No 1 was awarded the Gold Award for the Best European Single Malt in Whisky Magazine's World Whiskies Awards 2014.
