= Royal Agricultural Society of Victoria =

The Royal Agricultural Society of Victoria (RASV; since 2021 trading as Melbourne Royal) was founded in 1848, when a group of Melbourne's leading citizens formed the Agricultural Society of Victoria with the aim of "furthering the quality of Australia's primary production by means of contests and competitions".

RASV promotes the development of and celebrates agriculture through agricultural events and food and drinks awards programs.

RASV's flagship event, the Royal Melbourne Show attracts around 450,000 people each year.

== Runs ==
- Melbourne Royal Show
- Royal Melbourne Poultry Show
- Australian International Beer Awards
- Australian Distilled Spirits Awards
- Australian Food Awards
- Melbourne Showgrounds
- Royal Melbourne Alpaca Show
- Australian International Coffee Awards
- Royal Melbourne Wine Awards
