= Overeem Whisky =

Australian Whisky Distillery

Coordinates: 41°05′20.3″S 145°54′34.9″E

- Location: Hobart, Tasmania
- Owner: Mark and Jane Sawford
- Founded: 2005; 21 years ago
- Status: Operational
- No. of stills: 2
- Website: www.overeemwhisky.com

Overeem Whisky
- Type: Single malt
- Cask type(s): Port, Sherry, Bourbon (Core)
- ABV: 43%–60% (Cask Strength)
- Cask type(s): Red Wine, Muscat, Stout, Tokay (Limited)

Overeem Whisky is a producer of Australian whisky, brandy and liqueurs in Hobart, Tasmania, Australia founded as the Old Hobart Distillery by Casey Overeem in 2005, with the first casks filled in 2007. The Old Hobart Distillery was the fourth whisky distillery in Tasmania and is considered one of the founding distilleries of Australian whisky.

== History ==
The distillery was founded during the early days of the Australian craft whisky industry, after Bill Lark of Lark Distillery successfully lobbied the government to change laws preventing whisky distilling outside of large volume companies.

Initially distilled in a shed at the front of Overeem's property in Hobart (known as Casey's Shed amongst Australian whisky enthusiasts), with a wash brewed at Lark Distillery, Overeem Whisky first went to market in 2012, just prior to the Tasmanian Whisky boom brought about by fellow Tasmanian distillery, Sullivan's Cove, winning the World's Best Single Malt at the World Whisky Awards. Overeem, with his daughter Jane as marketing and sales manager quickly established the Overeem Whisky brand in the whisky community, being awarded the 'overall winner' of the Australian section at the World of Whisky event in Sydney in 2012, and Jim Murray's 'Liquid Gold' award in the 2014 Whisky Bible.

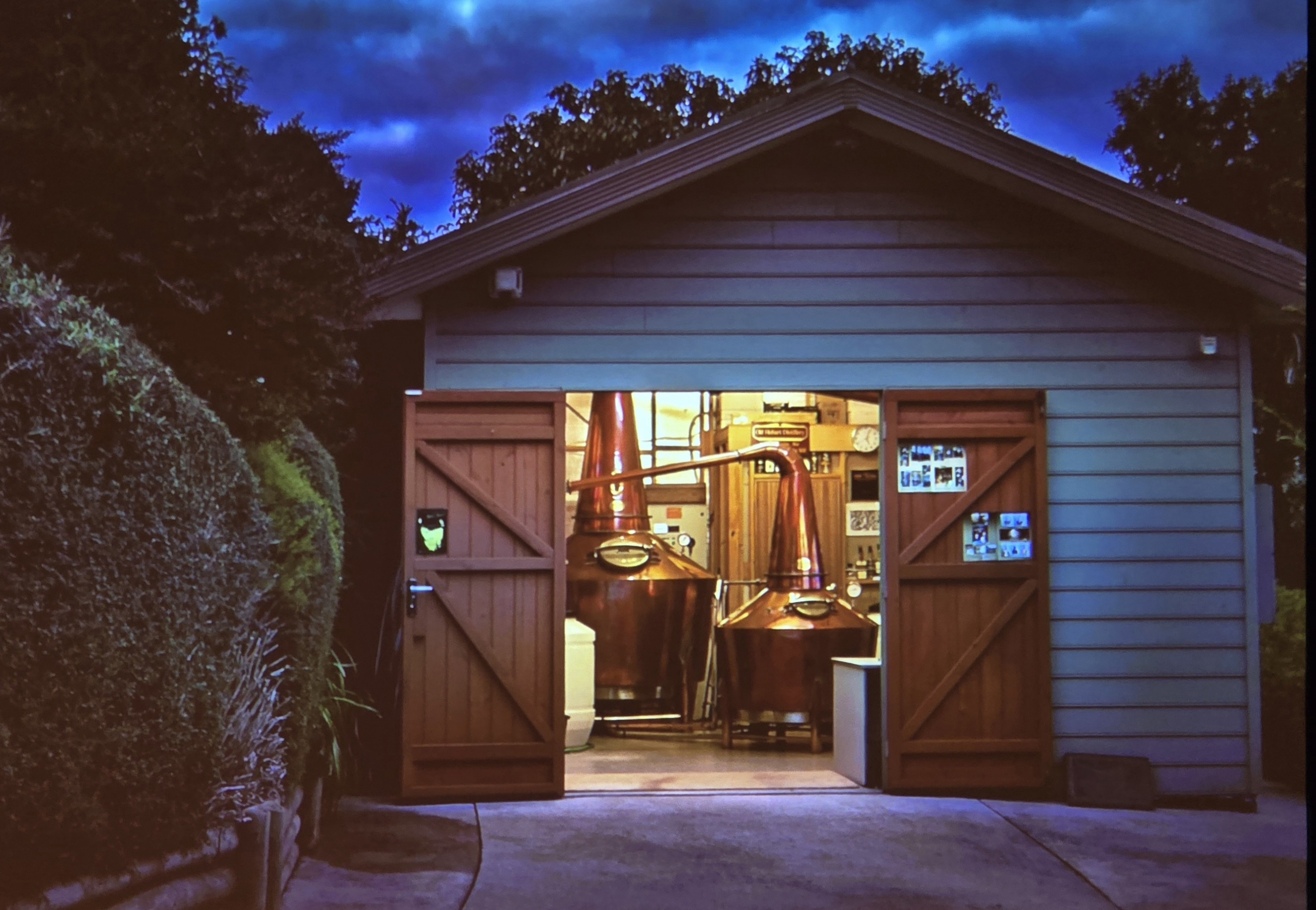
The original Overeem Distillery known as Casey's Shed, after founder Casey Overeem

In early 2014, Casey Overeem moved towards semi-retirement, and sold the Old Hobart Distillery (including Overeem Whisky) to Lark Distillery. Six months prior Lark owners, Bill and Lyn Lark, had sold a large part of their distillery to a syndicate of investors in Hobart - known as Australian Whisky Holdings. Production of Overeem Whisky moved to Lark Distillery in 2016, which meant that two of Hobart's four founding distilleries were produced at the same location.

In 2017 Overeem's daughter, Jane, and her husband, Mark Sawford established their own distillery, Sawford Distillery, on a site that included the underground bond store that had been used at different times by both the Lark and Overeem Whisky brands, with aims to release Sawford branded single malt whiskies in 2022.

In late 2019, it was announced that Mark and Jane Sawford would be acquiring the Overeem Whisky brand and some maturing Overeem Whisky stock from Lark Distilling Co. In February 2020, the sale was confirmed, and Overeem Whisky officially returned to the founding family when the acquisition was finalised on 30 June 2020. During the acquisition it was announced that whisky from the Sawford Distillery, as well as maturing Overeem Whisky stock from both the Old Hobart Distillery and from Lark, would be released under the Overeem Whisky brand moving forward - this left the distillery in the somewhat unique position of having whisky produced at three different locations under the same banner.

Overeem Whisky has continued to win industry awards, including awards at the Australian Whisky Awards, and multiple medals at the World Whiskies Awards, including Gold in 2023; whilst Jane Sawford (nee Overeem) was awarded Australian Distillery Manager of the Year in the World Whiskies Awards 'Icons of Whisky' in 2021.

At their 20th Anniversary celebrations in 2025 they announced that cask SD-001 would be the first and only whisky released under the Sawford Whisky brand. Cask OD-1000, the one thousandth cask filled by the distillery, and a Pedro Ximénez cask limited release were announced on the same evening.

== Products ==
Overeem Whisky have a core range of six products, all aged in 100 L (22 imp gal; 26 US gal) casks of three types: Bourbon, Sherry and Port, bottled at two strengths: Distiller's Strength (43%) and Cask Strength (60%). Whilst the whisky carries no age statement, it has previously been stated that the whisky is five to six years old and usually aged in 100L barrels.

Whilst mostly releasing single casks, they also release an annual Man of Promise Reserve release, chosen by founder, Casey Overeem, from a vatting of multiple casks and released at the ABV he believes best suits the whisky; and have released limited release whiskies finished in Stout, Muscat and Tokay casks; a number of twelve year old whiskies aged in 200 L (44 imp gal; 53 US gal) ex-bourbon casks; and an annual 'Floc Shots' release in collaboration with Whisky Lovers Australia.

Overeem Whisky has also been bottled by Scotland based Independent Bottler That Boutique-y Whisky Company on multiple occasions, including as their first Australia releases in 2015/16.

=== Core range ===
- Bourbon Cask - Distiller's Strength (43%)
- Sherry Cask - Distiller's Strength (43%)
- Port Cask - Distiller's Strength (43%)
- Bourbon Cask - Cask Strength (60%)
- Sherry Cask - Distiller's Strength (60%)
- Port Cask - Distiller's Strength (60%)
- Red Wine Cask (discontinued) (43%)

=== Special releases ===
- Stout Cask Finish (61.2%)
- Muscat Cask Finish (48.5%)
- Tokay Cask Finish (45.5%)
- Sherry Matured & Sherry Finished (47%)
- 12 Year Old Bourbon Cask (46%)
- 12 Year Old Bourbon Cask (60%)
- Man of Promise (annual release - ABV varies)
- Floc Shots (43%)
- 10 Year Old Lightly Peated Sherry Cask (59.5%)
- Sherry Stout Marriage
- Floc Shots
- Port & Sherry Marriage Cask Strength
- PX Spanish Cask Marriage

=== Other products ===
- XO Brandy
