= Kyrö Distillery Company =

Finnish rye distillery company

Coordinates: 62.983685°N 22.353671°E

Rye Rye Osakeyhtiö
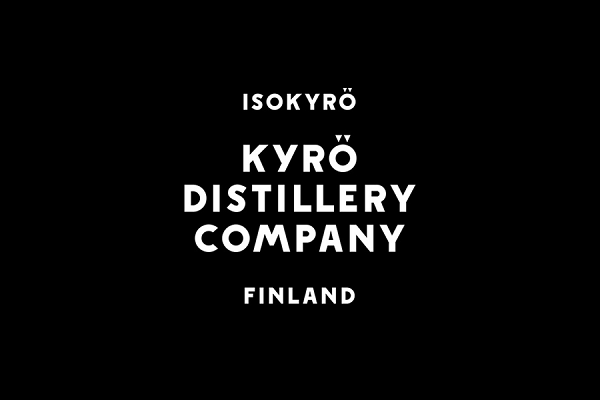
- Trade name: Kyrö Distillery Company
- Type: Privately held company limited company
- Industry: Distilled beverages
- Founded: 29 August 2012; 14 years ago in Isokyrö, Finland
- Founders: Miika Lipiäinen; Mikko Koskinen; Kalle Valkonen; Miko Heinilä; Jouni Ritola
- Headquarters: Oltermannintie 6, Isokyrö, Finland
- Products: Kyrö Gin; Kyrö Dark Gin; Kyrö Pink Gin (rye gin); Kyrö Malt Rye Whisky; Dairy Cream cream liqueur; Juuri (rye whiskey); Long Kyrö (long drink); hand sanitizer
- Revenue: ▲€4,4 million (2019)
- Number of employees: 29 (2019)
- Website: kyrodistillery.com

Kyrö Distillery Company is a Finnish rye distillery founded in a sauna in 2012. Kyrö uses 100 per cent Finnish rye to produce rye gin and rye whisky. In 2015, Kyrö Napue Gin, formerly known as Napue, won the Best Gin for Gin & Tonic category in the International Wine and Spirit competition. In August 2020 Kyrö launched its rye whisky, Kyrö Malt. To support health care workers during COVID-19, Kyrö started producing hand sanitizer. Through the sales of hand sanitizer, the company managed to avoid layoffs, and they have continued in production.

== Company ==
Kyrö Distillery Company was registered as Rye Rye Osakeyhtiö by Miika Lipiäinen, Mikko Koskinen, Kalle Valkonen, Miko Heinilä, and Jouni Ritola on 29 August 2012, in Isokyrö, Finland . The idea to establish the company came to the founders while they were sitting in a sauna drinking American rye whisky They wondered about the lack of whisky distilleries based on rye in Finland—an ingredient they considered vital to Finnish society. The founders had no experience in the distilling industry and visited micro-distilleries and still makers around Europe to gather knowledge. The distillery itself was built next to the River Kyrö in a 1908-built cheese factory which used to produce the Finnish Oltermanni cheese.

The Helsinki-based design agency Werklig created a visual identity for the company, including a custom typeface called Napue Sans based on memorial engravings of the 1714 Battle of Napue, which was fought close to the distillery's location during the Great Northern War. The typeface is used in all of Kyrö's products and media including its logo.

In 2020 Kyrö Distillery Company GmbH was started. Kyrö operates a web shop through the German company, where products are available for purchase throughout Europe. Kyrö distributes their products globally to around 30 countries.

== Products ==
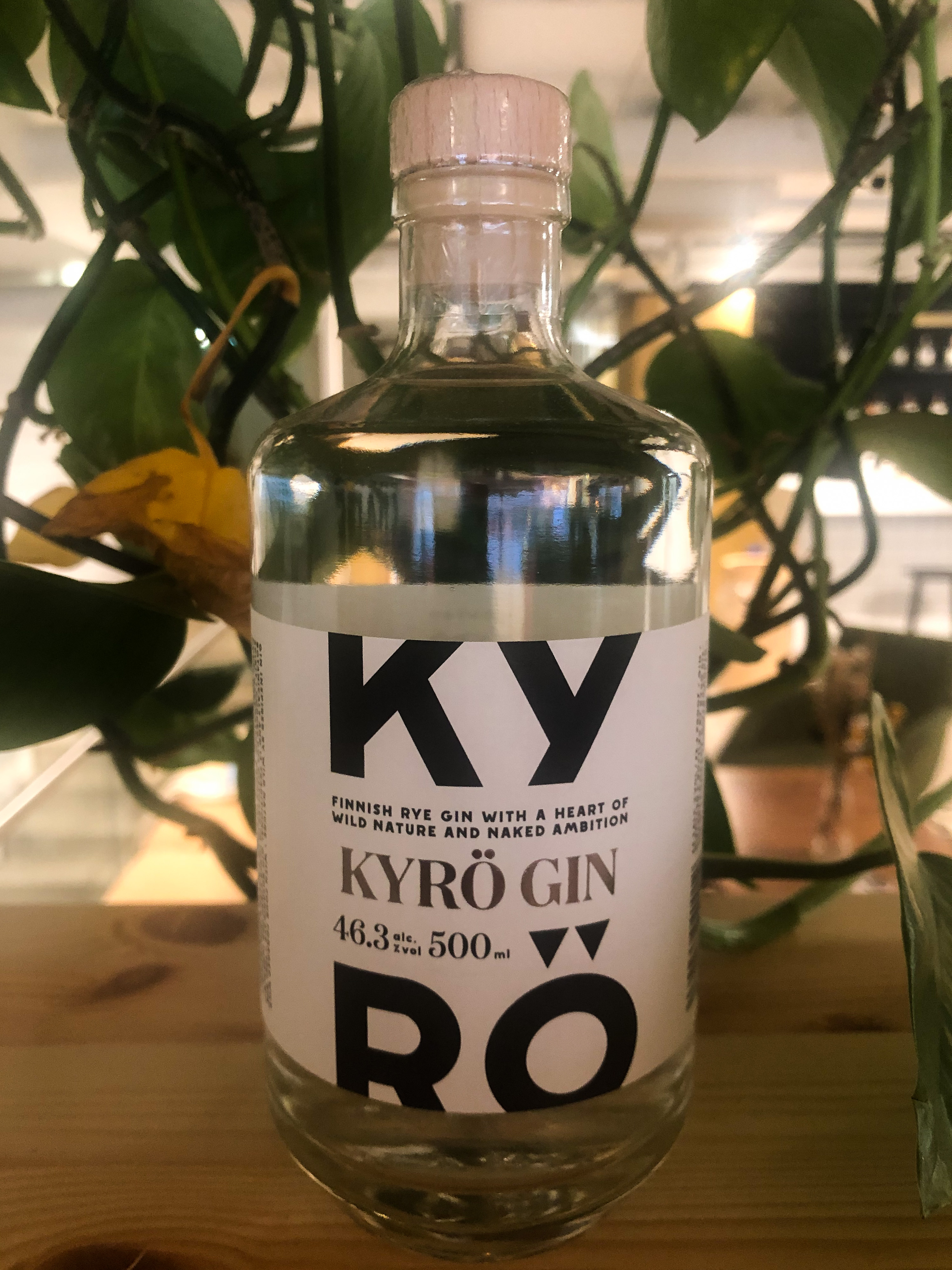
New 500ml bottle of Kyrö Gin (formerly known as Napue gin).

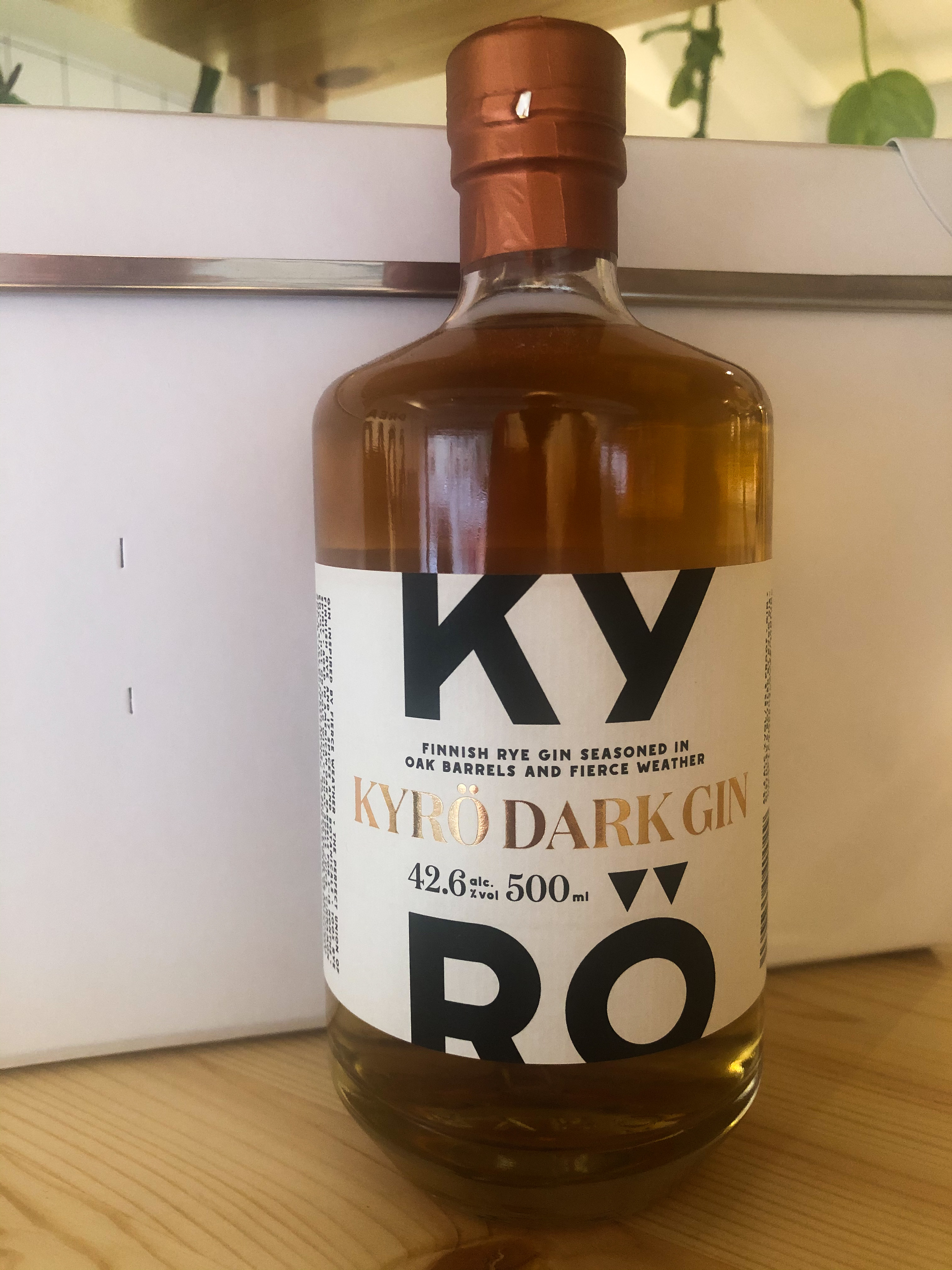
500ml bottle of Kyrö Dark Gin. This used to be called Koskue.

The Kyrö Distillery distills whisky, gin, and other spirits from 100% Finnish whole-grain rye. At first, the goal was only the production of rye whisky, but the founders began the production of gin in the meantime, due to the minimum of three years that single malt whisky is to be aged under European Union regulations, thus enabling the company to generate revenue from gin while waiting for the whiskey to mature. For gin products, the rye spirit is used as a base with different herbs added to it. Due to the short summer in Finland, the staff distills individual botanical concentrates from locally foraged herbs in order to produce gin year-round.

=== Kyrö Malt Rye Whisky ===
Eight years after the idea of the Kyrö Distillery was conceived in a sauna, Kyrö released their Kyrö Malt Rye Whisky. It is 100% made of Finnish wholegrain rye. It is produced in pot stills and aged in American oak barrels between three and five years. In 2020, Kyrö Malt was awarded 98/100 points and an outstanding medal from International Wine and Spirits Competition.

=== Kyrö Gin (Napue) ===
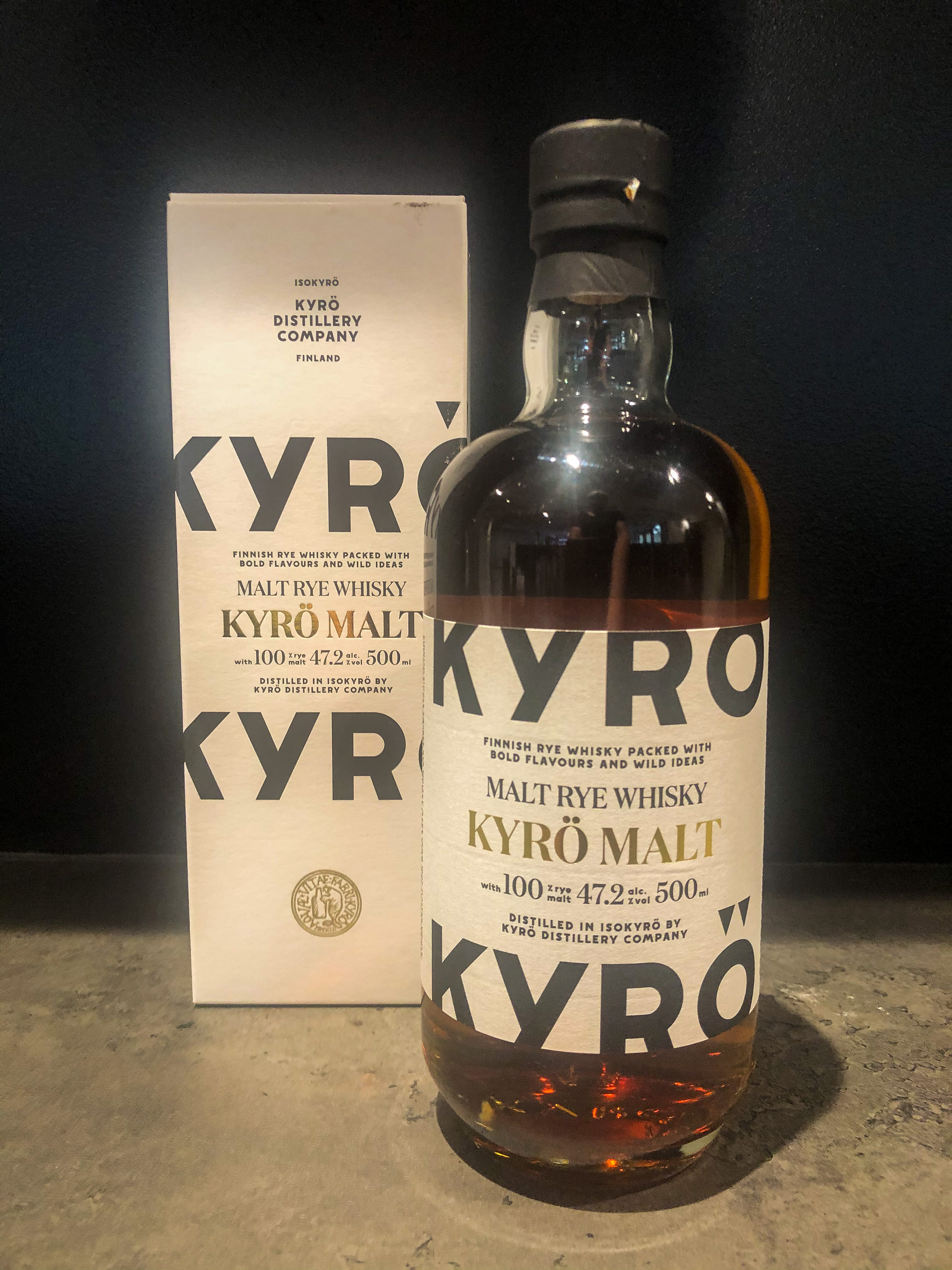
Bottle and package of Kyrö Malt Rye Whisky by Kyrö Distillery. Whisky came out 17 August 2020.

Kyrö is best known for its Kyrö Gin, formerly known as Napue. Gin and tonic made with Napue gin won the Best Gin for the Gin & Tonic category at the International Wine and Spirit Competition (IWSC) in 2015. Following the award, Napue's production increased from the previously planned 23,000 bottles to 100,000 bottles in 2015.

Sixteen different herbs are used to make Kyrö Gin, including juniper, lemon peel, angelica and cardamom as well as locally foraged meadowsweet, cranberries, birch, and sea buckthorn. Four of the herbs are individually distilled and mixed in with the other twelve to ensure a consistent outcome.

In 2019 the name was changed from Napue to Kyrö Gin. Kyrö Gin & Tonic remains a classic cocktail served with rosemary and cranberries.

=== Kyrö Dark Gin (Koskue) ===
Kyrö Dark Gin was formerly known as Koskue. It is a rye gin that combines Finnish rye with 17 spices and botanicals, including black pepper and orange peel. The Dark Gin is aged for three months in American oak barrels. Kyrö Dark Gin can be mixed with apple juice and served hot or cold.

=== Dairy Cream ===
Since the Kyrö Distillery operates in an old dairy, they brought cream back to production with Dairy Cream cream liqueur. It is a lactose-free cream liqueur that uses locally produced cream and Finnish rye whisky.

=== Juuri & Smoke & Rye ===
Juuri ("root") is a new make. Juuri means the origin and in this case, it is the origin of Kyrö Malt, before the rye spirit comes in contact with any barrels.

Additionally, Kyrö produces small-batch experiments developed by external beverage experts under the Kyrö Study label, such as the Smoke & Rye spirit.

=== Kyrö Cranberry ===
Since 2016, Kyrö has produced a craft long drink together with Finnish brewery Laitilan Wirvoitusjuomatehdas. The cranberry long drink, called Kyrö Cranberry, uses Kyrö Gin as its base.

=== Other Products ===
Kyrö has also done collaborative products with other distilleries. Teeling Distillery aged their Irish whiskey in Kyrö's gin casks (which they use for Kyrö Dark gin) while Kyrö aged some of their gin in Teeling's whiskey casks. Together with the Japanese Kyoto Distillery, Kyrö produced a botanical exchange that celebrated the 100th year of Finnish‐Japanese diplomatic relations. Both distilleries used botanicals from the other to make a special batch of gin.

Besides the collaborative products, Kyrö makes Pink Gin. The gin gets its flavours from strawberries, lingonberries, and rhubarb and it stands for equality.

=== Hand Sanitizer ===
To fight the COVID-19 pandemic, Kyrö began producing hand sanitizers in March 2020. First, their product was used by institutions critical to society (i.e. hospitals). Later on, they began selling hand sanitizer to consumers. However, the company doesn't turn a profit on this, instead selling it for a reasonable price. Because of the hand sanitizer production and sales, the company managed to avoid layoffs.

== Awards ==
- In 2015, gin and tonic made with Napue rye gin was awarded Best Gin for the Gin and Tonic category in the International Wine and Spirit Competition.
- In 2015, Kyrö won second place in the Spirits category of the Dieline Awards for package design and was shortlisted for the Cannes Lions' Premium Packaging category.
- In 2016, Napue rye gin was given a gold medal in the San Francisco World Spirits Competition's premium gin series.
- In 2016, The Spirits Business magazine awarded the company with a "Master medal" in the Digital & Social Media category in its Distillery Masters competition, and gave the company gold medals in Distillery Facilities, Consumer Experience, and Distillery Innovation.
- In 2016, Juuri unaged rye whisky won a gold medal in the Whisky category of the International Spirit Awards (IWSC).
- In 2017, Koskue rye gin won a gold medal in the San Francisco World Spirit Competition.
- In 2018 Kyrö Dark Rye Bitter won silver and an outstanding medal in the IWSC
- In 2018 Kyrö Pale Rye Bitter won bronze in the IWSC
- In 2018 Kyrö Napue Gin won bronze in the IWSC
- In 2018 Kyrö Koskue Dark Gin won silver in the IWSC
- In 2019 Dairy Cream won the highly commended design award in the IWSC
- In 2019 Kyrö Malt #6 won gold in the IWSC
- In 2019 Kyrö Koskue Dark Gin won silver in the IWSC
- In 2019 Kyrö Napue Gin won silver in the IWSC
- In 2020, Kyrö Pink Gin won bronze in the IWSC
- In 2020, Kyrö Malt won gold and an outstanding medal in the IWSC

== See also ==
- Agriculture in Finland
- Industry in Finland
- Finnish rye bread
- Finnish whisky
- Sahti
- Scandinavian design
