= Melbourne Showgrounds =

Event venue in Melbourne, Australia

- Melbourne Showgrounds
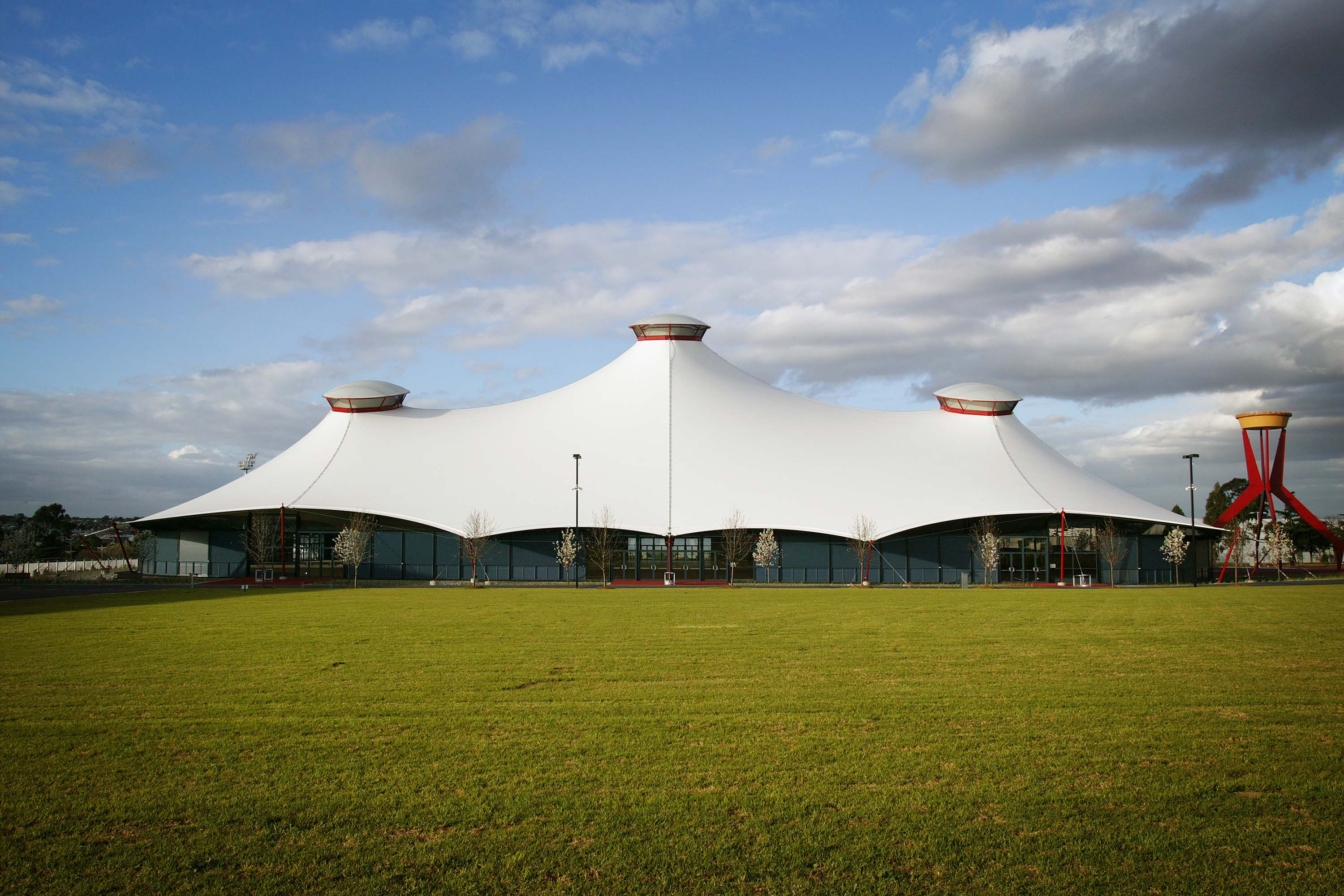
- The grand pavilion is the heart of Melbourne Showgrounds
- Interactive map of Melbourne Showgrounds
- Former names: Royal Melbourne Showgrounds (1848-2006)
- Location: Epsom Road, Ascot Vale, Victoria.
- Coordinates: 37°46′58″S 144°54′39″E
- Owner: Royal Agricultural Society of Victoria
- Surface: Indoor and outdoor

Construction
- Opened: 1848
- Renovated: 2006

Website
- www.melbourneshowgrounds.com

Melbourne Showgrounds is located in the inner north-western suburb of Ascot Vale, Victoria, Australia, next door to Flemington Racecourse. The largest and most flexible indoor/outdoor venue space in Melbourne the Showgrounds is the home of the annual Melbourne Royal Show, as well as major exhibitions, trade shows, and music concerts, including the Supanova Pop Culture Expo, the Caravan & Camping Touring Supershow and MotoExpo.

The venue has also been the selected site for TV and film production and is the current filming location for MasterChef Australia.

It has previously been used for large music festivals – as of 2010, it plays host to Stereosonic until the Festivals end in 2015.

It also was used on the last show on The Police's Synchronicity Tour, their last world tour, before they re-united briefly to play three concerts for the Amnesty International A Conspiracy of Hope Tour and reuniting in the studio.

== History ==
=== Establishment ===
Aerial photo of the Royal Melbourne Showgrounds before World War II

The 30-acre (12 ha) site at Ascot Vale was given to the National Agricultural Society of Victoria (predecessor of the Royal Agricultural Society of Victoria) in 1882. The first Show held the next year and over the next few decades a number of pavilions were erected on the site. During both World War I and World War II the showgrounds were requisitioned for military purposes. The main arena played host to harness racing as well as the annual show; in fact, it was the main harness racecourse in metropolitan Melbourne for almost four decades until the early 1980s, when all major Victorian harness meetings were moved to Moonee Valley Racecourse. During the 1970s the first major attractions were built, such as the 1,800 feet long chairlift, with 112 chairs that covered the journey in 7 minutes. In 1977 the new Government Pavilion was completed, costing $1,800,000 and covering an area of 2,839 square metres. The iconic "Pie in the Sky" was also built the same year, and was heritage listed in 1999.

As well as hosting harness racing, the 610 metres (670 yards) Melbourne Showground track was a semi regular host of speedway. During the 1980s and early 1990s the showground saw such Motorcycle speedway riders as World Champions Ivan Mauger, Hans Nielsen, Michael Lee, Shawn Moran, Simon Wigg and Tommy Knudsen, as well as Australia's Phil Crump, Rod Hunter, Mark Fiora and Todd Wiltshire. During this time the showground hosted two annual speedway events, the "Boxing Day Spectacular", and the "Mr Melbourne" title held in January. Winners of these events included Simon Wigg, Tommy Knudsen and Todd Wiltshire.

=== Redevelopment ===
By the early 2000s the Royal Melbourne Showgrounds had become dilapidated, especially when compared to other Australian venues such as the Sydney Showgrounds at Homebush. As a result, the State Government announced a redevelopment of the Royal Melbourne Showgrounds site, to be carried out as a joint venture partnership with the Royal Agricultural Society of Victoria and private sector investors, with demolition commencing in June 2002, and all work to be completed by the 2006 Royal Melbourne Show.

In March 2004 a list of the three short-listed consortia was announced, with the winning applicant revealed in December that year: PPP Solutions – a consortium of financier Babcock and Brown, Multiplex Constructions, Multiplex Facilities Management, Spotless Services and Daryl Jackson Architects. The contract with PPP Solutions was signed on 22 June 2005, and required the consortium to design, build, finance and maintain the showground facilities for a period of 25 years.

Costing $146 million, the government provided $101 million for the project, the Royal Agricultural Society $16 million, and the remaining $29 million will come from lease revenue and management fees. Two-thirds of the 27-hectare (67-acre) site was redeveloped as a venue for the Royal Melbourne Show, while 'non-core' land along Epsom Road and Langs Road to be given over to other uses.

The works were completed as planned by the 2006 Royal Melbourne Show, and included the following new works:

- An 8,000-square metre Grand Pavilion,
- A new 10,000-square metre Exhibition Pavilion, which can house livestock,
- A new 4,300-seat outdoor arena, capable of holding two horse competition rings,
- A Grand Boulevard linking the grassy spaces and events areas, and
- The new headquarters for the Royal Agricultural Society of Victoria.

The following heritage buildings were also restored:

- Centenary Hall, an art-deco hall built in 1934 and now restored to its original condition,
- The heritage-listed Public Grandstand, built in 1915 with new seating,
- Pie in the Sky, the heritage-listed and popular meeting point which was built in 1977.

Before the redevelopment the main arena had a 15,000 capacity, with the new basic rectangle arena opened for the 2006 Royal Melbourne Show. Around the same time the rest of old arena was demolished.

In 2008 the development of the Epsom Road site was announced, with Coles Group building a $40 million neighbourhood shopping centre, featuring a Coles supermarket, 1st Choice Liquor superstore, 30 retail spaces ranging in size from 50 square metres to 600 square metres, and a not-for-profit child care centre able to accommodate up to 120 children. The heritage listed Woodfull Pavilion was also incorporated into the development, which opened in August 2009.

== Film and television productions ==
The showgrounds have also been used to film numerous television productions including commercials.

=== Current ===
- MasterChef Australia (Ten Network) (2013–present)
- Thank God You're Here (Seven Network) (2009), (Ten Network) (2023–present)

=== Past ===
- Pugwall (Nine Network) (1989-1991)
- The Librarians (ABC) (2007, 2009-2010)
- Rush (Ten Network) (2008-2011)
- MasterChef Australia: The Professionals (Ten Network) (2013)
- AFL commercial shoot
- ME Bank commercial shoot
- Family Food Fight (Nine Network) (2017)
- On The Beach (1959 movie) by Stanley Kramer Productions (All interiors shot in the Government Pavilion)
- Lego Masters (Australian TV series) (Nine Network) (2019–2021)

== Public transport ==
The showgrounds has its own railway station on the Flemington Racecourse line, only open for the Royal Melbourne Show and other special events.

Extra trams also run to the showgrounds for the duration of the Royal Melbourne Show, running along route 57.
