= Archie Rose Distilling Co. =

Australian distillery

- Type: Private
- Industry: Distilled Beverage, Hospitality
- Founded: 2014; 12 years ago
- Founder: Will Edwards
- Headquarters: Sydney, NSW, Australia
- Products: Spirits (Gin, Vodka, Rye Whisky, Single Malt Whisky, Rum)
- Website: https://archierose.com.au

Archie Rose Distilling Co. is an Australian independent distillery located in Rosebery, New South Wales, a few kilometres south of Sydney CBD. The distillery produces a range of spirits including gin, vodka, whisky and rum.

== History ==
=== Founding (2014 - 2015) ===
Archie Rose Distilling Co. was founded in Sydney by Will Edwards in 2014. Edwards began research in 2012, with visits to New York distilleries, and through meetings with other Australian distillers.

Upon returning to Sydney, Edwards commissioned Peter Bailly, Australia's only still maker at the time, to hand-build three copper pot stills which are steam heated by a gas-powered steam boiler.

Archie Rose launched in March 2015 as a Distillery and Bar located in Rosebery, Sydney. The company initially produced three spirits, Signature Dry Gin, Original Vodka and White Rye—though casks of Rye and Single Malt Whisky were laid down early, with the Archie Rose whiskies launching in 2019 and 2020 respectively.

As a multi-spirit distillery, Archie Rose now produces whisky, gin, vodka and rum across two ranges, including the Signature Range and Fundamental Spirits range. The Signature Range features Signature Dry Gin, Distiller’s Strength Gin, Native Botanical Vodka, Rye Malt Whisky, Single Malt Whisky and White Cane, and the Fundamental Spirits range features True Cut Vodka, Double Malt Whisky and Straight Dry Gin, along with a range of Bottled Cocktails and pre-mix whisky, gin and vodka cans.

=== Botany Expansion and Operations (2020–present) ===
In 2020, Archie Rose expanded production by moving its distillery operations to Banksmeadow, Sydney. The Banksmeadow site was built to incorporate specialised equipment, including a mash filter capable of processing heavily roasted local malts and unmalted native Australian grains. The facility also features custom copper vacuum stills that utilise low-pressure cold distillation to protect heat-sensitive botanicals during extraction. The original Rosebery distillery, located next to the Archie Rose Bar, was converted into an event space.

By 2024, marking its tenth anniversary of operation, the distillery had received over 400 international and domestic spirits awards for their spirits, experiences and brand, making it Australia’s most highly awarded distillery.

Edwards himself has been named Global Young Achiever of the Year by Spirits Business in 2020 and a Forbes 30 under 30 winner.

In August 2026, Chris Hemsworth joined Archie Rose Distilling Co. as co-owner, in order to prepare the company to enter the United States.

== Sustainability and B Corp Certification. ==
In August 2026, Archie Rose Distilling Co. achieved B Corp certification. The assessment recognised the company’s recycling and wastewater management, use of recycled materials including recycled orange peel in gin and vodka production, and supply of spent grain for cattle feed.

The company completed its transition to 100 per cent locally sourced whisky malts in 2021 after six years of trials, works with Australian farmers to grow custom grains and botanicals, and uses native stringybark timber as a local alternative to imported Scottish peat in its smoked whisky production.

Employee initiatives cited in the certification included inclusive hiring practices, cross-functional training, study leave, an inclusive bonus scheme, and team social initiatives the company links to high staff retention. Archie Rose founder, Will Edwards, said the certification was a mark of the company’s 12 year journey to create the highest quality Australian spirits using locally grown ingredients. “We remain committed to sourcing locally and ethically, to telling the story of the growers and ingredients behind our spirits, and to looking after our people, our community and the environment,” Edwards said. “We’re extremely proud to reach this milestone and to share it as we launch Archie Rose into new markets around the world.”

== Awards ==
Recent Notable Award Wins for Archie Rose Distilling Co.
Year	Competition	Award Name	Product
2025	San Francisco World Spirits Competition (USA)	DOUBLE GOLD	Single Malt Whisky
2025	The Drinks Business Asian Spirits Masters 2025	GOLD	Rye Malt Whisky
2025	The Drinks Business Asian Spirits Masters 2025	GOLD	Single Malt Whisky
2025	The Gin Masters 2025	MASTER MEDAL	Bone Dry Gin
2025	SIP Awards (USA)	GOLD	Double Malt Whisky
2025	SIP Awards (USA)	GOLD	Heritage Red Gum Cask Single Malt Whisky
2025	SIP Awards (USA)	SILVER & Consumer Choice Award	Signature Dry Gin
2025	SIP Awards (USA)	GOLD & Consumer Choice Award	Single Malt Whisky
2025	SIP Awards (USA)	PLATINUM - BEST OF CLASS	Rye Malt Whisky
2025	Australian Distilled Spirits Awards	GOLD - TROPHY	Rye Malt Whisky
2025	Australian Distilled Spirits Awards	GOLD	Double Malt Whisky
2025	Australian International Spirits Awards	GOLD	Australian Malt Whisky
2025	World Whisky Masters	GOLD	Rye Malt Whisky
2025	2025 Sydney Royal Distilled Spirits Champion	GOLD	Signature Dry Gin
2025	2025 Sydney Royal Distilled Spirits Champion	GOLD	Australian Malt Whisky
2025	The Spirits Business Awards	Runner Up - Distiller of the Year	Dave Withers
2026	World Whiskies Awards	GOLD - Category Winner	Australian Malt Whisky
2026	London Spirits Competition	Rye Whiskey Of The Year	Rye Malt Whisky
2026	The World Gin Awards	Country Winner, GOLD	Signature Dry Gin
2026	IWSC	Spirit Gold 2026	Single Malt Whisky
2026	San Francisco World Spirits Competition (USA)	GOLD	Single Malt Whisky
2026	Australian Distillers Association	Finalist	Innovation Award
2026	Australian International Spirits Awards	GOLD + Consistency of Excellence Award + Best Grain Whisky	Rye Malt Whisky
