= Australian whisky =

Type of distilled liquor produced in Australia

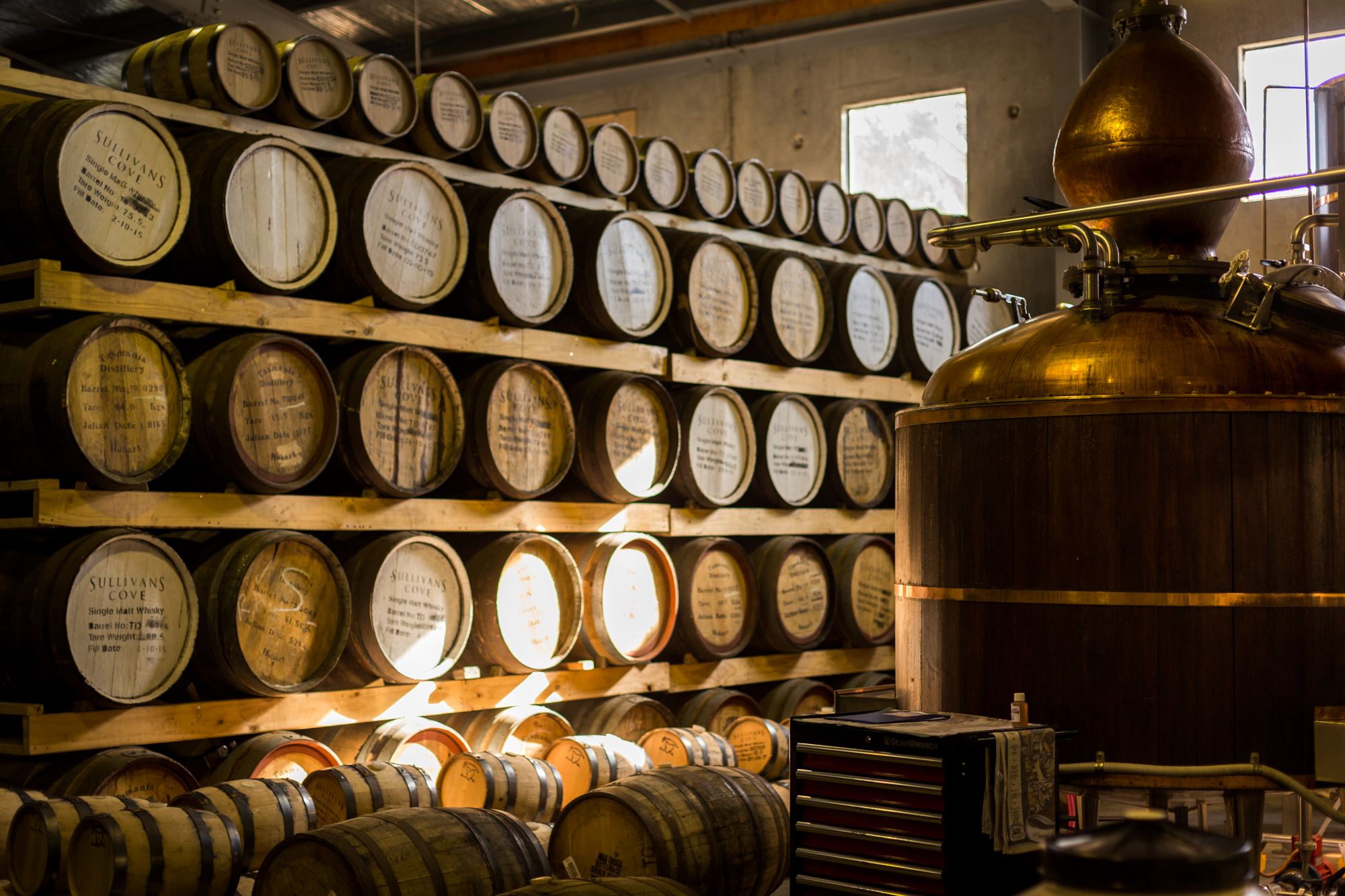
Inside Sullivans Cove distillery in Tasmania, Australia

Australian whisky is whisky produced in Australia. As of December 2021, there were 333 registered distilleries in operation within Australia, of which approximately 50 have a whisky on the market. The industry has shown steady growth since the early 90s especially in the boutique craft distilling scene.

Most Australian whisky is produced using a very similar process to that of Scotch whisky; however the flavour of Australian whisky is subtly different. Although the majority of whisky produced in Australia is in the single malt style, there is more variation than what is found overseas, with no strict customs or traditions governing the styles produced. Other styles of whisky produced in Australia, include rye, wheat and blended whiskies.

Australian whisky was popularised globally in 2014, when Sullivan's Cove French Oak single cask won the world's best single malt whisky at the World Whiskies Awards. This was the first time a distillery outside of Scotland or Japan had won this category.

== History ==
While Australia has a history of whisky distilling dating back to 1820, the whisky industry looks very different in the 21st century to when it began. Distillation was legalised by the governor of New South Wales at the end of 1820, and by 1822 the first legal distillery was opened near Hobart Town.

Van Diemen's Land's fledgling whisky industry of the 1820s-30s ended quickly and there was no whisky produced on the island between 1838 and 1990. Sydney also had two large distilleries in operation between 1825 and 1850 when their focus shifted to making rum instead.

It is estimated that a total of 140 million litres of whisky was produced in Australia between 1822 and 1979; however, no whisky was produced in Australia between 1980 and 1990. The whisky industry in Australia can be broken down into three distinct periods: the colonial malt whisky period (1863–1929), the blended whisky period (1930–1980) and finally the boutique whisky period, since 1992.

=== The colonial malt whisky period (Victoria 1863–1929) ===
Following the Victorian Distillation Act 1862, the first large scale whisky distillation in the country began in 1863, with the opening of John Dunn's Warrenheip distillery outside Ballarat; Warrenheip distillery was Australia's second largest distillery until 1930.

In 1888 the Federal distillery was constructed in Port Melbourne and was the third largest distillery in the world at the time. By 1894, Federal Distillery produced in excess of 1.1 million litres of spirit per year, however not all of this was whisky, as the distillery also produced brandy and gin.

=== Blended whisky period (Victoria 1930–1980) ===
The second major period in Australian whisky history began when large British distilling companies started opening distilleries within Australia, using imported materials from Britain. In 1930, the Distillers Company of Edinburgh (now known as Diageo), opened Corio distillery outside Geelong; Corio Distillery replaced Warrenheip as the largest producer of whisky in Australia. Soon after opening, Corio Distillery merged with Federal Distilleries company.

Following the end of World War II, Gilbey's of London, the second largest distiller in the world at the time, opened a distillery in Melbourne, simultaneously acquiring the Milne Distillery in Adelaide.

This meant that almost all whisky distillation in Australia was controlled by the two international distilling companies Gilbey's of London, and the Distillers Company of Edinburgh. At the time protectionist laws gave both companies a 40% price advantage over imported Scotch whisky. Based on this, both companies made the commercial decision to produce lower quality whisky in Australia, in order to control the cheap whisky market within the country. This resulted in a poor quality and reputation for the whisky produced in Australia during that period.

In 1960, the protectionist tariffs on imported whisky were removed, meaning that imported whisky became much more affordable. This led to a significant drop in demand for the lower quality whisky being produced in Australia domestically. As a result of this by 1980, both major Australian whisky distilleries had shut down and been sold.

=== The boutique whisky period (since 1992) ===
In the early 1990s several small craft distilleries began to open beginning with Lark Distillery in 1992, and followed by other small distilleries in Tasmania and Victoria. Prior to 1990, distillation in Australia was only accessible to large commercial companies, this was due to the Distillation Act 1901, which prevented licences from being issued for distilleries whose primary wash still was smaller than 2,700 litres. By comparison, in 2020 one of the largest independent distilleries in Australia, only used an 1,800 litre wash still. In 1990 Bill Lark, the founder of Lark whisky, lobbied the government to have this restriction amended, and is largely credited as being responsible for overturning this law.

Since 1990, the whisky industry in Australia has seen significant growth, as of 2020 there are over 293 distilleries in operation within Australia, of which an estimated 50 have whisky products on the market, with more in the process of creating their first whisky.

== Modern distilleries by state ==
As of 2020, there were approximately 50 active distilleries producing whisky in Australia. While Tasmania hosts the largest concentration of whisky distilleries in Australia, there are also many whisky distilleries scattered throughout Australia.

=== New South Wales ===
After Tasmania, NSW has the second most whisky distilleries in Australia, with 9 whisky distilleries in 2020, and has a large number of urban distilleries located in the Sydney area.

Notable Distilleries:

- Archie Rose Distillery: Founded in 2014, Archie rose was the first new distillery to open in Sydney since 1853, and initially were known for their gin and vodka. In 2018, Archie rose began releasing rye malt whisky, and was awarded the world's best rye whisky in 2020.
- Manly Spirits: Founded in 2017, manly spirits primarily produces gin and vodka, however begun production of whisky to be released in 2020.

=== South Australia ===
Whisky has been made in South Australia since the 1890s, produced in both column and pot stills. Many of the distilleries in South Australia are near or within wine growing regions and take advantage of the tourism and wine barrels this provides.

Notable Distilleries:

- Fleurieu Distillery, Located in Goolwa. 2021 best whisky (Tasting Australia), 2020 Gold Medal (American Distilling Institute Awards)
- Adelaide Hills Distillery, locally sourced single paddock grains used to make single cask whiskies. Award-winning native grain whiskies produced using Australian native weeping grass.
- Smith's Angaston, distilled using a 1908 vintage copper pot still and aged in South Australian muscat casks
- 5Nines, established in 2016, single malts made with local malted barley. Some editions use South Australian peat.

=== Queensland ===
The climate in Queensland is not ideal for whisky maturation, and most distilleries in Queensland are dedicated to rum production. There are currently five small distilleries in Queensland producing whisky: Mt Uncle Distillery, Wild River Distillery, Castle Glen Distillery, Stillmaker & Sons Distillery and Waterview Distillery. There was a sixth distillery being 2020 Distillery but it went out of business.

=== Tasmania ===
Tasmania has the most distilleries of any state in Australia by far, with over 22 whisky distilleries in 2020. This is due to conditions in Tasmania being very suitable for whisky production. The climate has a large diurnal temperature range, and seasonal variation, which is desirable for whisky maturation. In addition, distilleries in Tasmania claim to use some of the best quality water in the world.

Notable Distilleries:

- Lark Distillery: Often referred to as the grandfather of craft whisky in Australia, Bill Lark begun distilling in 1992 at home, and shortly after opened the first whisky distillery in Tasmania since the 1830s. In 2015, Bill Lark was inducted into the Whisky Hall of fame, and at the time was only the seventh person outside Scotland or Ireland to be given the honour.
- Sullivans Cove Distillery: The second-longest running modern whisky distillery in Australia, Sullivan's Cove was established in 1994, however changed ownership in 1999. Under the new owners Sullivan's Cove has won many awards for their whisky, most notably the world's best single malt in 2014. In 2022, the distillery won the craft distiller of the year title at the World Whiskies Awards.
- Hellyers Road Distillery: Founded in 1997 by a boutique milk co-operative ‘Betta Milk’, success for Hellyers Road Distillery grew quickly due to the distinctive and unique flavour of the distillery's single malt whiskies. It soon became Australia's largest selling single malt whisky producer, with exports to over 20 countries in 2020.
- Overeem Whisky: founded in 2007 by Casey Overeem, the fourth distillery in the state and winner of multiple medals over several years at the World Whisky Awards, including Gold for the best Australian Single Cask in 2023.

=== Victoria ===
Victoria has seven active whisky distilleries, much like Sydney many of these are located in the city of Melbourne.

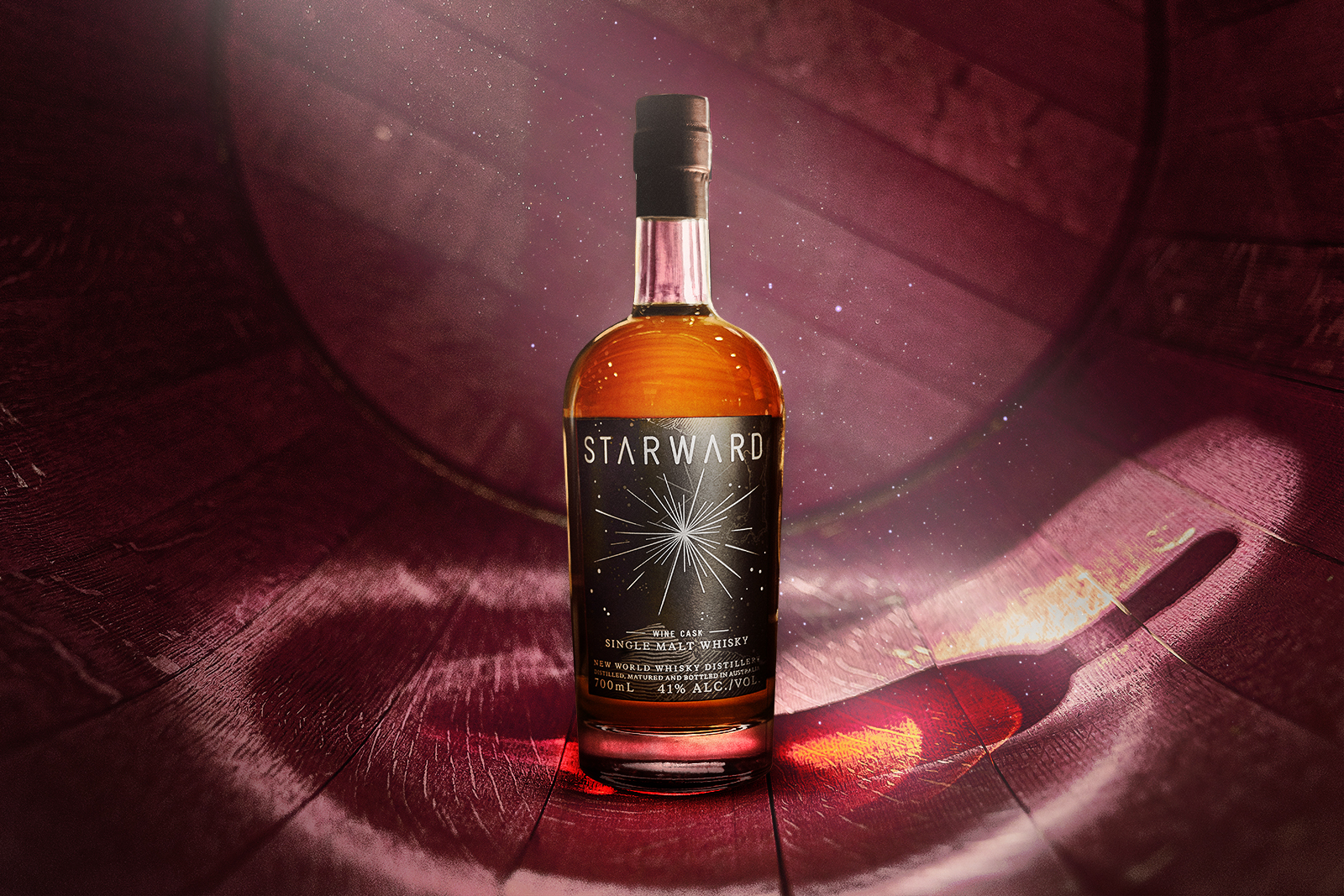
Starward's wine cask whisky

Notable Distilleries:

- Starward: Established in 2004, Starward was founded under the name New World Whisky distillery in an old Qantas hangar. Starward distillery is known for its wine cask whisky, matured exclusively in wine barrels sourced from the Barossa valley region. In 2022, with a total of 15 gold and double gold medals, and the first title of distillery of the year to be awarded to an Australian distillery, Starward received more awards than any other distillery at the San Francisco World Spirits Competition. This made the distillery the most awarded distillery of 2022 in the competition.
- Bakery Hill Distillery: Founded in 1999 by biochemist David Baker, Bakery Hill distillery is one of the few Australian whiskies that is made in the peated style. The distillery has received many international awards for its whisky.

=== Western Australia ===
There were four whisky distilleries in Western Australia as of 2020. Though a small fledgling industry, Western Australia whiskies have won international awards, in particular Limeburners whisky won 'Best International Craft Whisky in the World' by the American Distillers Institute in 2017.

Notable Distilleries:

- Great Southern Distillery, established in Albany in 2004. It was the first distillery in Western Australia to make single malt whisky legally. Producers of international award-winning whisky, Limeburners. Their Porongurup distillery makes Tiger Snake Sour Mash Whiskey, Dugite Whiskey, Brandy and Rum.
- Geographe Distillery, established in 2008 in Myalup. Producers of Bellweather Whisky (peated single malt whisky)
- Grove Distillery, established in Margaret River in 1995, originally a winery before creating spirit based liqueurs and evolving into a distillery in 2012, producing corn mash whisky, rum, gin and absinthe.
- Whipper Snapper, established in 2014 in Perth.

== Critical reception and awards ==
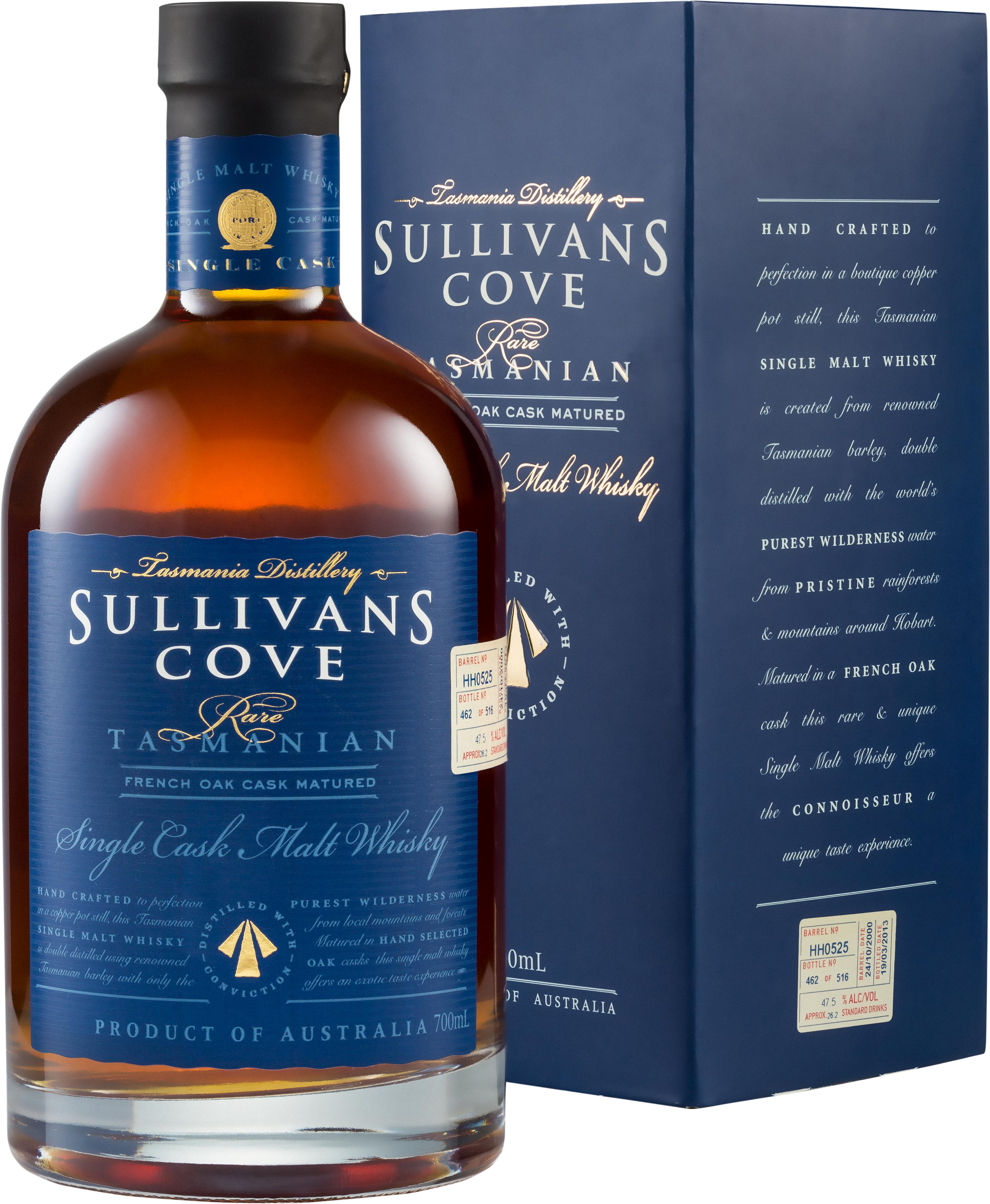
Sullivans Cove's 2014 Single Cask French oak. Awarded world's best single malt whisky at the world whiskies awards 2014.

Until the early 1990s, Australian whisky was poorly regarded both internationally and within Australia, with mass-produced low quality whisky dominating the market. Whisky produced during the mid-1900s had a poor reputation locally, and was considered inferior to imported products. After the emergence of the craft whisky scene in the 1990s, Australian whisky began garnering attention from international critics.

In 2013, prolific whisky critic Jim Murray praised the fledgling Australian whisky industry, describing a Sullivans Cove whisky as “a staggering achievement”. This international attention culminated in 2014, when Sullivans Cove distillery won the world's best single malt at the world whiskies awards for its Single Cask French Oak whisky. The award was of particular importance as it marked the first time a distillery outside of Scotland or Japan had won, and helped garner worldwide attention for the relatively small Australian whisky industry, and was an excellent source of international promotion.

Australian whiskies continued performing well internationally with multiple distilleries placing highly in worldwide competitions, notably Sullivans Cove continued to be awarded the world's best single cask single malt whisky in 2018 and 2019.

In addition to the single malts, in 2020 Archie Rose Distillery was awarded the world's best rye whisky, a category formerly dominated by the United States and Canada.

== Style and process ==
As with all whisky, grain is the principal ingredient in Australian whisky production, being required for its sugar content (see distillation). Traditionally in Scotland, malted barley is used to distil ‘malt whisky’ whereas ‘grain whisky’ is produced from the cheaper grains such as corn, oats or wheat, and can be produced at a higher volume. Blended whiskies are created through the process of blending the more neutral grain whisky with the much more flavourful, albeit more expensive malt whisky. Distillation processes for distilling whisky vary across the world; Australia uses the same double pot still method widely used to distil single malt whisky in Scotland.

While Australian whisky is produced using a very similar method to Scottish whisky, the resulting flavour is slightly different. Unlike the Scotch industry, Australia has no deep customs or traditions surrounding its whisky, resulting in an increased variation in styles and flavours of whisky produced within Australia.

While the US stipulates bourbon be made using only new unused American oak barrels, Australia (and Scotland) does not have this constraint. Due to this, most Australian whisky is matured in ex-bourbon barrels, with most of the remainder matured in ex-port barrels.

Some distilleries use former wine casks, such as Starward Distillery's Wine Cask Edition whisky.

Many of the whiskies produced in Australia use brewing barley instead of traditional distilling barley — brewing barley has a slightly different and stronger flavour than distilling barley; this lends a unique flavour to many Australian whiskies.

== Economic impacts ==
Since the late 2000s, many rural areas of Australia have seen growth in tourism related to the whisky industry, and many regions promote Australian whisky trails.

As worldwide awareness of Australian whisky grows, many producers are beginning to export larger quantities overseas. As of 2020, the whisky industry in Australia remains relatively small, and Australians consume only an estimated 1% of locally made spirits. Many small distilleries cite the excise tax regime in Australia as an obstacle to growth, with a standard 700ml bottle attracting close to $30AUD in tax depending on alcohol concentration.

== See also ==
- Australian cuisine
- List of whisky brands
- Outline of whisky
- New world whisky
