= Penderyn distillery =

Whisky distillery in Rhondda Cynon Taf, Wales

Coordinates: 51°45′51″N 3°31′16″W

Penderyn (whisky)
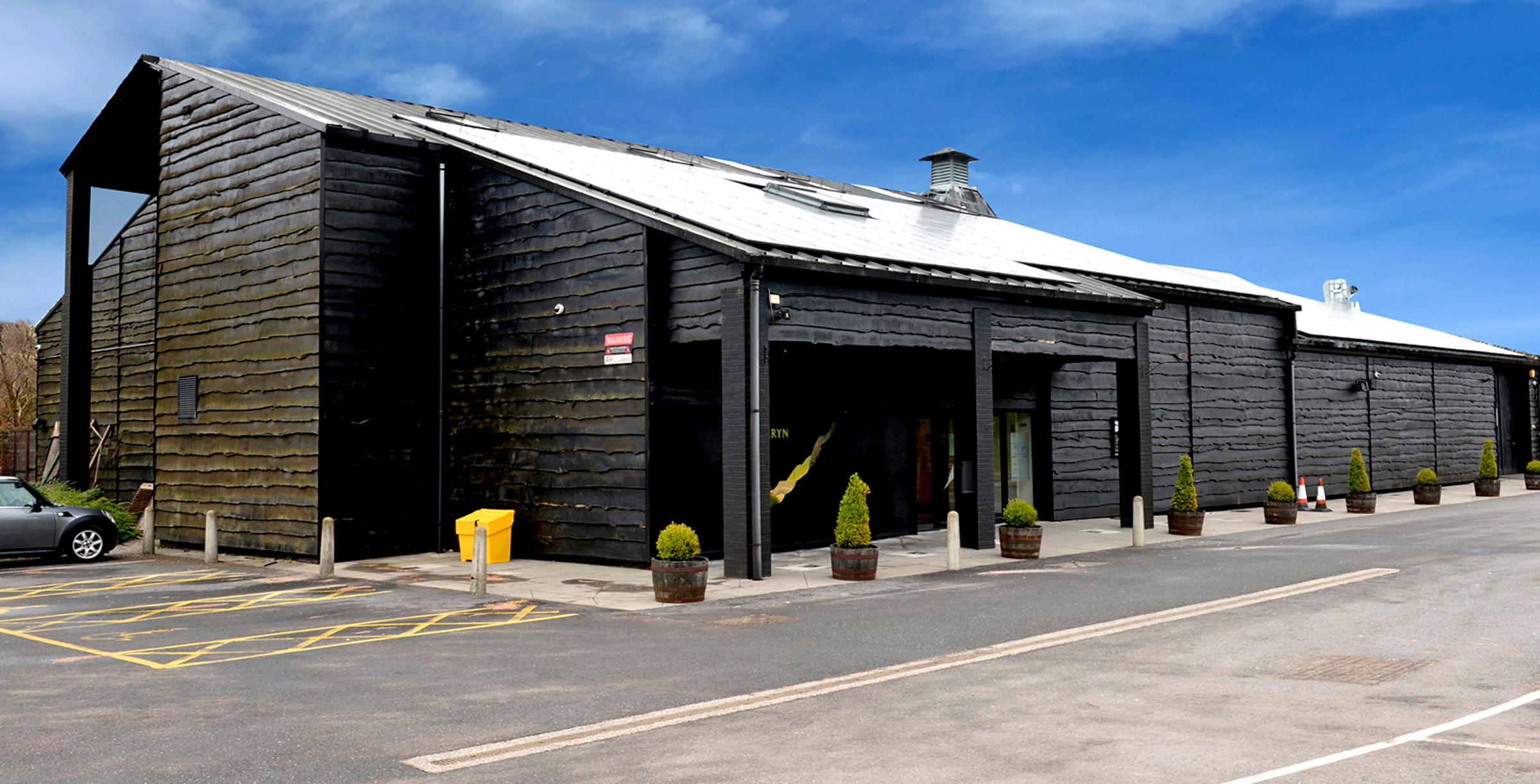
- Exterior of the distillery, 2014

Region: Wales
- Location: Penderyn, Rhondda Cynon Taf
- Founded: 2000
- Status: Active
- Water source: Brecon Beacons National Park
- Capacity: 700,000 litres
- Website: www.penderyn.wales

Penderyn Madeira
- Type: Single Malt
- Cask type(s): Bourbon, Madeira
- ABV: 46

Penderyn Sherrywood
- Type: Single Malt
- Cask type(s): Bourbon, Sherrywood
- ABV: 46

Penderyn Peated
- Type: Single Malt
- Cask type(s): Bourbon, Peated
- ABV: 46

Penderyn is a Welsh whisky distillery and brand, producing the first commercially available whisky made in Wales since the 19th century. Produced at the Penderyn Distillery (the Welsh Whisky Company), Penderyn is a single malt whisky produced in several expressions, e.g. Madeira Finish, Peated, Sherrywood and Portwood.

The distillery also produces the Dragon range comprising Legend (Madeira finish), Myth (Bourbon finish) and Celt (Peated), as well as gin and vodka.

== Background and products ==
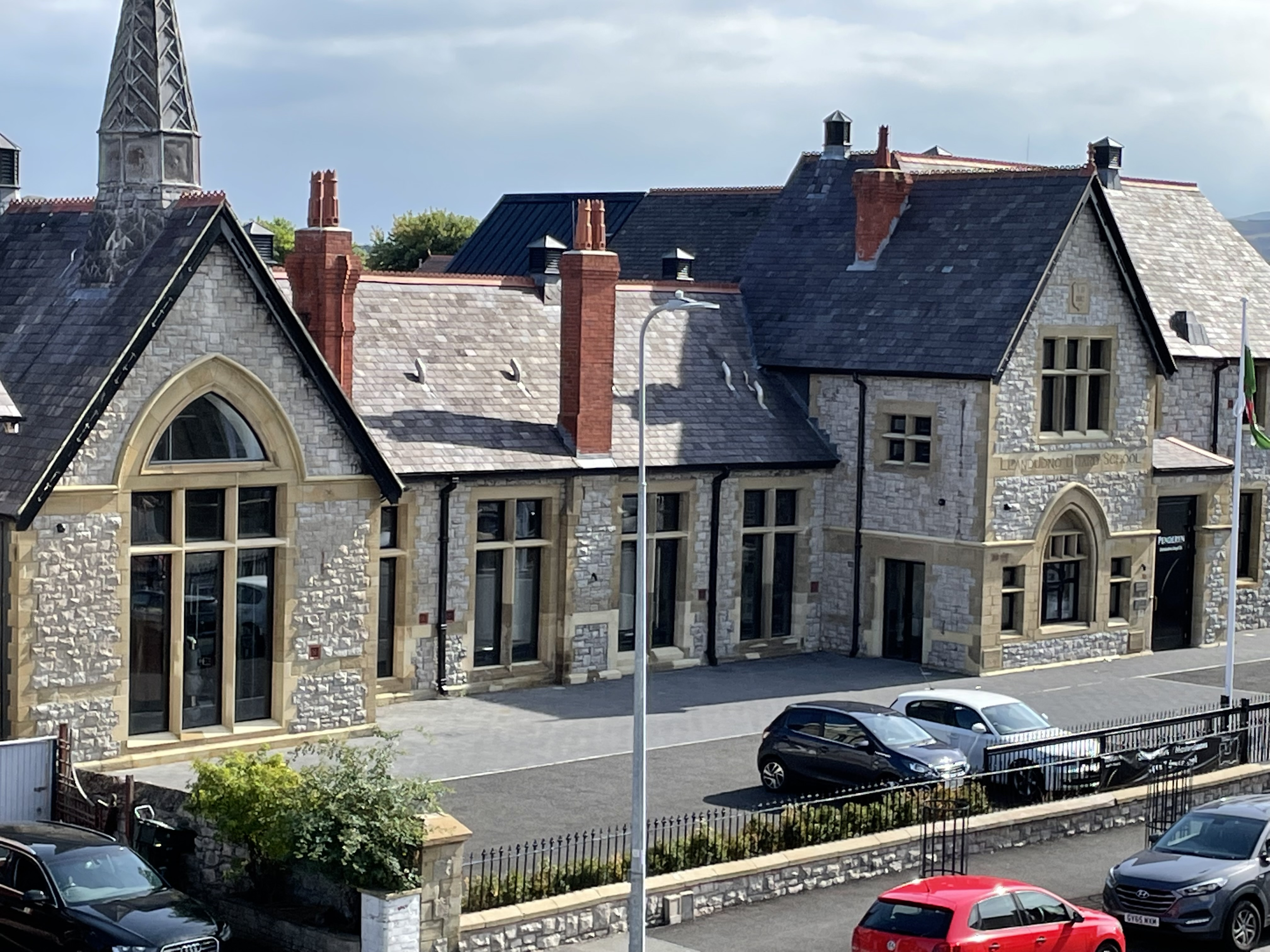
The Penderyn Llandudno Lloyd St Distillery in August 2022

It is distilled in the village of Penderyn, Rhondda Cynon Taf, in the Cynon Valley, from which the brand takes its name.

The company was launched in 2000 as the Welsh Whisky Company. Whisky had been distilled in Wales for hundreds of years, but stopped in 1894. Penderyn became the first whisky to be manufactured in Wales for over a century when sales started in 2004.

The Penderyn Distillery also produces non-Whisky products: Merlyn Cream Liqueur, Five Vodka and Brecon Gin. Brecon Gin was awarded "Gold Best in Class" at the International Wines & Spirits Competition in 2011.

Penderyn Distillery is situated in the Brecon Beacons National Park and sells internationally to markets such as Taiwan, Australia, France and USA. The company opened up a visitors centre in June 2008, with Charles, then Prince of Wales leading the proceedings. The visitors centre now sees more than 35,000 visitors per annum.

In May 2020 plans for a new distillery in Llandudno were approved. The new Lloyd Street Distillery opened on 17 May 2021, called the Penderyn Llandudno Lloyd St Distillery on the site of the former Llandudno Board School, later known as Lloyd Street School.

A third distillery called Swansea Copperworks was opened in June 2023 in Swansea near Hafod Copperworks.
