= Schlitzer Destillerie =

Coordinates: 50.6752°N 9.5573°E

Schlitzer Destillerie (Schlitzer Korn & Edelobstbrennerei GmbH)
- Company type: GmbH
- Industry: Drink
- Founded: 1585
- Founder: nobles from Schlitz
- Headquarters: Schlitzer Destillerie, Schlitz, Hesse, Germany
- Key people: Konrad Schwab
- Products: Spirits
- Owner: Town of Schlitz 90% Town of Hünfeld 10%
- Number of employees: 19
- Website: www.schlitzer-destillerie.de

The Schlitzer Korn & Edelobstbrennerei GmbH is a liquor manufacturer in Schlitz, a small town in the Vogelsbergkreis in eastern Hesse, Germany.

The distillery was founded in 1585, and is thus regarded as the oldest still-producing distillery in Germany. The production site was an outbuilding of the Schlitzer brewery until the 20th century, when it was finally moved into its present location.

The former count's estate passed in 1969 in connection with the Karlshof as Staatsdomäne into the possession of the German state of Hesse. In 2006 the distillery was sold and converted into a limited company (GmbH). Today's owners are the towns Schlitz (90%) and Hünfeld (10%). Total assets for the year 2011 amounted to 1,223,422 euros, while profits were reported as 70360.04 euros.

Overall, the distillery produces 35 different spirits in addition to Schlitzer Burgen-Kümmel: liqueurs, fruit liqueurs, cordials, fine fruit brandies and whiskeys which are produced and internationally distributed under the brands of Feinbitter, Schwarzwilderer, Bruder Bernhard, Rhönwurz and bitters Boonekamp. For this herbs and fruits such as blackthorn, blueberry, lemon, cassis, Woodruff, raspberry, cherry and orange are used. Its products have been awarded honors by the DLG several times. Since 2008, organic spirits are also produced and since 2012, the company offers Burgen Vodka.

== Awards ==
- Every year DLG Gold awards for many products.
- In 2013 the 14-year-old Glen Slitisa Single Malt Wheat Whisky was awarded third place at the trade fair InterWhisky in Frankfurt.
