= Panimoravintola Koulu =

Brewery restaurant in Turku, Finland

Coordinates: 60°26′59″N 22°15′53″E

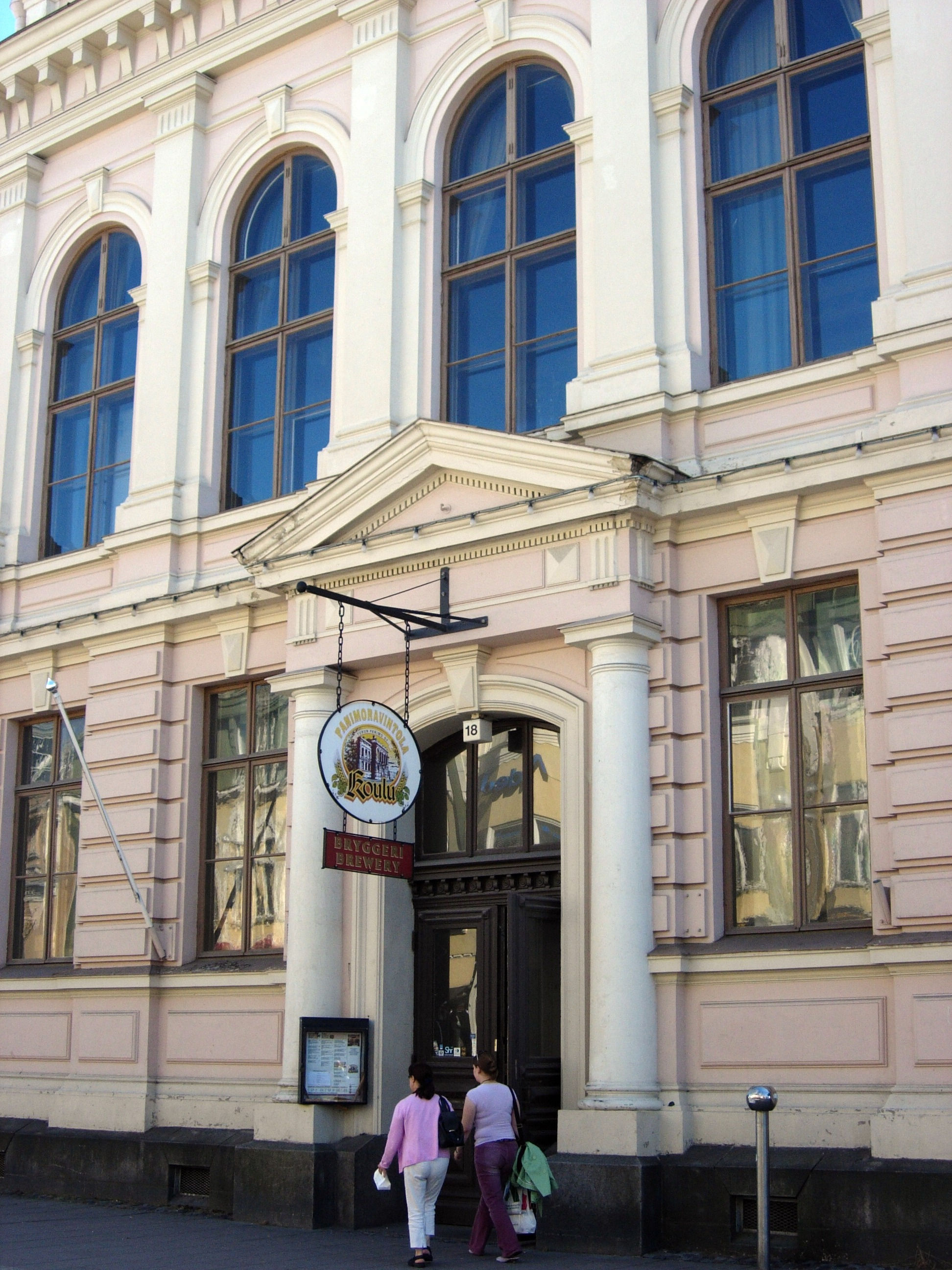
Panimoravintola Koulu facade

Panimoravintola Koulu is a Finnish brewery restaurant in the city of Turku. Koulu (Finnish for "school") is the largest brewery restaurant in Finland and it is situated in a former Neo-Renaissance style school building from 1889 by architects L. I. Lindqvist and Bruno Granholm. The school to first occupy the building was "Svenska Fruntimmerskolan i Åbo", which was later renamed as the "Svenska flickskolan i Åbo" in 1916, again in 1955 when it became "Åbo svenska flicklyseum", until finally in 1966 the name was changed to "Cygnaeus skola". On 4 February 1940, during the Winter War, the school was hit by a Soviet incendiary bomb, which set fire to the roof and destroyed the assembly hall (now known as the Bellman assembly hall). One of the high points in the history of Koulu was the visit of Commander-in-Chief, Baron Carl Gustaf Emil Mannerheim on 14 February 1941. The school was shut down in 1970. The restaurant was opened in 1998.

The restaurant's Bellman assembly hall and cabinets Cygnaeus and Wecksell on the second floor seat altogether 700 people at most and they can be reserved for conferences and private parties. Koulu's Winehouse, History class, Beerhouse, the summer kiosk outside and the brewery are on the first floor.

The brewery has four regularly produced beers and one cider. On top of which, the brewery also produces several (at least 12) special or seasonal brews throughout the year. All the beers are made under the regulations of the German purity law, the Reinheitsgebot from 1516. It allows only the use of water, malted barley, hops and yeast.

== Beers ==
- Maisteri (5.5%, dark lager) ("Master")
- Lehtori (4.7%, light lager) ("Lector")
- Ope (4.7%, light lager) ("Teacher")
- Reksi (7.2%, bock) ("Principal")
