= Lark Distillery =

Australian distillery

Lark Distilling Co. Ltd
- Formerly: Australian Whisky Holdings
- Type: Public
- Traded as: ASX: LRK
- Founded: 1992; 34 years ago
- Founder: Bill Lark AM; Lyn Lark
- Key people: Satya Sharma (CEO)
- Website: larkdistillery.com

Lark Distilling Co. Ltd is a producer of Australian whisky and liqueurs in Hobart, Tasmania, Australia.

== History ==
Lark Distillery was founded in 1992 by Bill and Lyn Lark. The couple sold the business in June 2013, retaining a 25% stake. In January 2014, Lark Distillery acquired Old Hobart Distillery, owner of the Overeem Whisky brand. Montec International Limited, a private equity company listed on the ASX in 2003, was primarily focused on the marketing and licensing of dairy technology. Montec entered the whisky business in February 2014 when it acquired a 32% stake in Lark Distillery. In late 2015, Montec changed its name to Australian Whisky Holdings Limited (AWH).

In March 2016, AWH purchased a 12% stake in Redlands Estate Distillery. In March 2019, activist investor Bruce Neill set in motion events which resulted in the entire board's resignation or voting off and the resignation of Brendan Waights, the company's acting chief executive and chief financial officer. Lark Distillery Single Malt Whiskey won a Gold Medal at the 2019 London Spirits Competition.

Australian Whisky Holdings was renamed Lark Distilling Co. in May 2020. The following month, Lark completed the sale of the Overeem business to Sawford Distillery. Lark Distillery became the first distillery in Australia to become carbon neutral in April 2021. In October 2021, Lark Distilling announced it would acquire Kernke Family Shene Estate, owner of the Pontville Distillery and Estate. In February 2022, CEO Geoff Bainbridge resigned after a video of him purportedly smoking methamphetamine was published. Laura McBain took over as interim CEO until the appointment of Satya Sharma in May 2023.
