= List of gin distilleries in England =

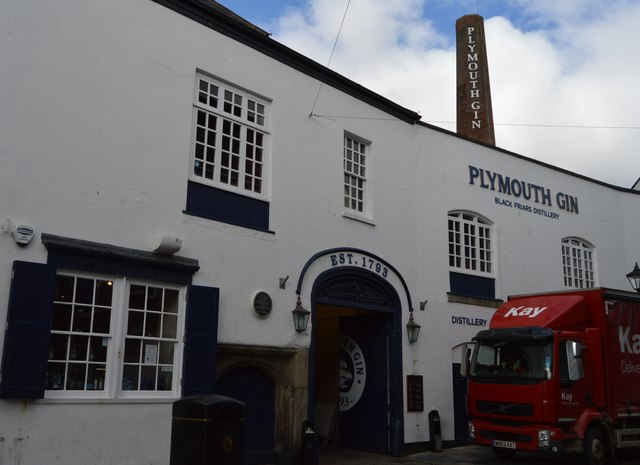

== List of distilleries by region ==
There are currently around 228 English distillers in the UK across 9 regions in England.

The Oldest English Gin Distillery is Plymouth Gin Distillery with the Langley Distillery being the largest distillery in the world.

Name	County	Town / city or village	Region
Botanical Distillery	Berkshire	Yattendon	London & South East of England
Griffiths Brothers Distillery	Buckinghamshire	High Wycombe	London & South East of England
Winchester Distillery	Hampshire		London & South East of England
Greensand Ridge Distillery	Kent	Shipbourne	London & South East of England
Maidstone Distillery	Kent		London & South East of England
Hayman's Distillery	London	Balham	London & South East of England
Sipsmith Distillery	London	Chiswick	London & South East of England
Beefeater Distillery	London	Kennington	London & South East of England
Abingdon Distillery	Oxfordshire	Bicester	London & South East of England
Chalgrove Artisan Distillery	Oxfordshire	Bicester	London & South East of England
The Henley Distillery	Oxfordshire	Bicester	London & South East of England
Sky Wave Distillery	Oxfordshire	Bicester	London & South East of England
Oxford Artisan Distillery	Oxfordshire		London & South East of England
Silent Pool Distillers	Surrey	Guildford	London & South East of England
Mousehall Distillery	Sussex	Mayfield	London & South East of England
Chew Valley Distillery	Bristol	Bristol	South West
Fowey Valley Distillery	Cornwall	Lostwithiel	South West
Mounts Bay Distillery	Cornwall	Cornwall	South West
Pocketful of Stones Distillery	Penzance	Cornwall	South West
Conker Spirit Distillery	Dorset	Bournemouth	South West
Plymouth Gin Distillery	Devon		South West
Steeplechase Distillery	Devon	Cheltenham	South West
Downton Distillery	Wiltshire	Salisbury	
Willow Tree Distillery	Bedfordshire	Sandy	East of England
Roundwood Distillery	Cambridgeshire	Huntingdon	East of England
East Coast Distillery	Essex	Frinton-on-Sea	East of England
Puddingstone Distillery	Hertfordshire	Tring	East of England
St Giles Distilllery	Norfolk		East of England
Adnams Distillery	Suffolk	Southwold	East of England
Cuckoostone Distillery	Derbyshire	Barlow	East of England
Bond Street Distillery	Leicestershire	Hinckley	Midlands
Louth Distillery	Lincolnshire	Louth	Midlands
Skegness Distillery	Lincolnshire	Skegness	Midlands
Wharf Distillery	Northamptonshire		Midlands
Warners Distillery	Northamptonshire	Harrington	Midlands
Ruddy Fine Distillery	Nottinghamshire	Nottingham	Midlands
Mallard Point Distillery	Rutland	Essendine	Midlands
Ludlow Distillery	Shropshire	Ludlow	Midlands
Shropshire Distillery	Shropshire	Ellesmere	Midlands
Wrekin Spirit Distillery	Shropshire	Telford	Midlands
Henstone Distillery	Shropshire	Welshpool	Midlands
Sixtowns Gin Distillery	Staffordshire	Stoke-on-Trent	Midlands
Pinnock Distillery	Warwickshire	Edgehill	Midlands
Cotswolds Distillery	Warwickshire	Stourton	Midlands
Midlands Distillery	West Midlands & Birmingham	Rowley Regis	Midlands
Wildjac Distillery	Worcestershire	Bewdley	
Three Wrens Distillery	Cheshire	Whitchurch	
Shed 1 Distillery	Cumbria	Ulverston	
The Lakes Distillery	Cumbria	Cockermouth	
Stockport Gin Distillery	Greater Manchester		
Brindle Distillery	Lancashire	Chorley	
Goosnargh Distillery	Lancashire	Preston	
Lytham Gin Distillery	Lancashire		
Tappers Gin Distillery	Liverpool & Merseyside	Upton (Wirral)	
Hotham's Distillery	East Riding of Yorkshire	Hull	
Taplin & Mageean Distillery	North Yorkshire	Leyburn	
Shakespeare Distillery	Warwickshire	Stratford-upon-Avon	Midlands
SpitFi			

== Regions ==
There are 9 regions across in England that produce English Gin.

Region	No of distilleries
North West	16
West Midlands	10
South West	29
North East	5
Yorkshire and the Humber	9
East Midlands	6
East of England	10
South East	17
London	24

== Gallery ==
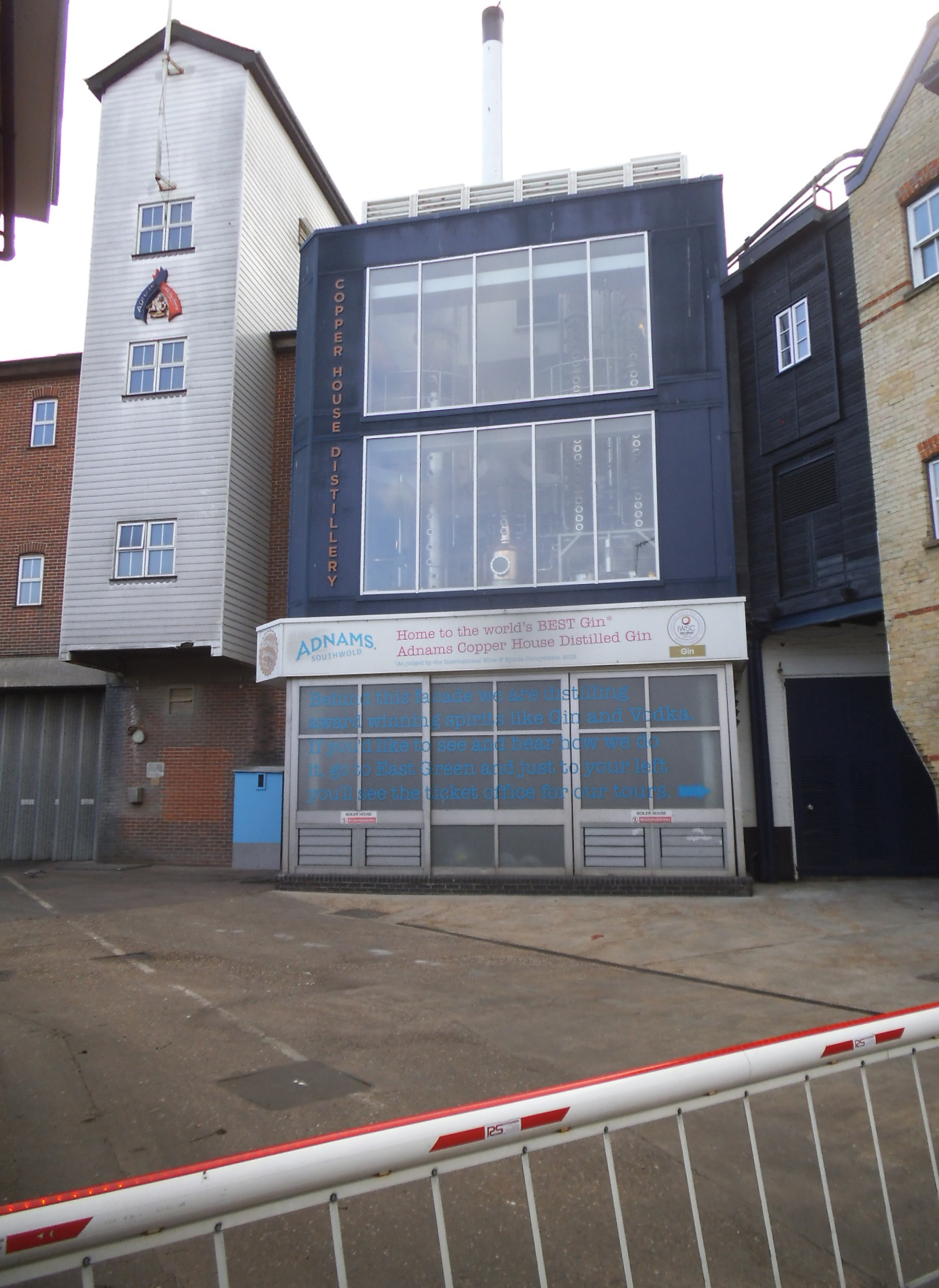
Adnams Gin Distillery

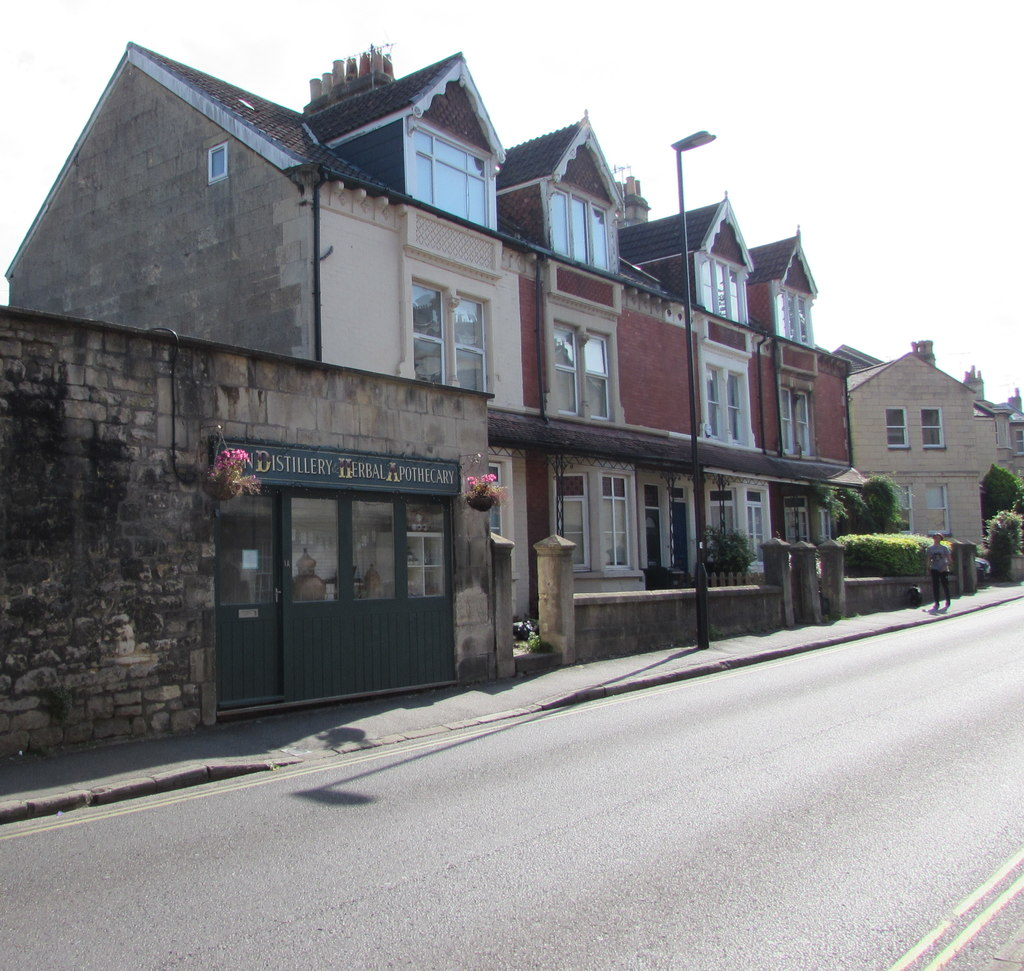
Bath Gin Distillery and Herbal Apothecary

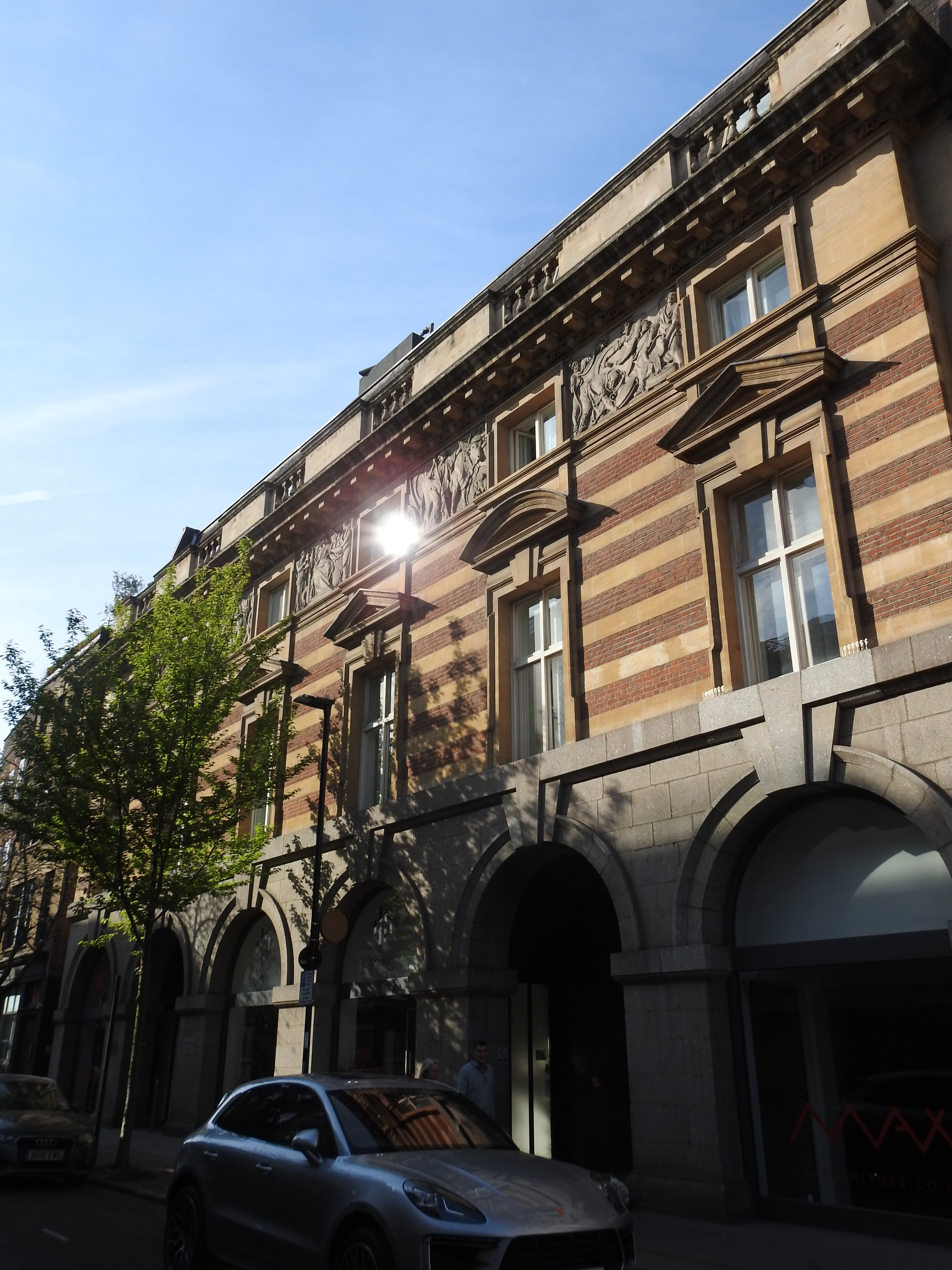
Booth's Gin Distillery

== See also ==
- Gin
- English whisky
- List of whisky distilleries in England
- English sparkling wine
- Food and drink industry in England
