= English whisky GI =

English whisky regulation

English whisky
- Geographical indication
- Front page of the English whisky GI
- Alternative names: English whiskey
- Description: A geographical indication for English whisky/whiskey
- Type: Distilled beverage
- Area: 9 Regions: North East England, Yorkshire and the Humber, East Midlands, East of England, London, South East England, South West England, West Midlands, North West England
- Country: England
- Registered: October 1 2026
- Material: malt, grains, water
- Official website: English whisky specification

The English Whisky Geographical Indication (GI) is a legal framework that regulates the production and labelling of English whisky. The GI was submitted by the English Whisky Guild in February 2022 and was accepted in September 2026. Previously, English whisky producers had followed EU Regulation (2019/787). The GI has been the topic of an ongoing heated debate around the use of the term "single malt".

== Specifications ==
The English Whisky Geographical Indication (GI) outlines the rules producers must follow for their products to be called English whisky. The product must use cereal grains grown in the United Kingdom and water sourced from England. The wash is milled and fermented in England, and distillation occurs in England to an alcoholic strength of less than 94.8% ABV. The spirit is matured in England in wooden casks of a capacity not exceeding 700 litres (150 imp gal; 180 US gal) for a minimum of three years and is bottled at a strength of more than 40% ABV. No sweeteners or additives, other than the colouring agent E150a (caramel), are permitted.

English single malt whisky, a category defined within the same GI, must be produced from malted barley grown in England and distilled in stills with sufficient copper contact at a single distillery in England. All the above criteria must be met for a product to be legally called English Whisky.

== Application ==
On 14 February 2022, the English Whisky Guild (EWG) applied for a geographical indication (GI) to establish a legal definition of English whisky. Suggested criteria included:

- All grain used in the production of English whisky must originate from the United Kingdom;
- The entire distillation process must be conducted within England;
- Maturation of the whisky must take place exclusively in casks within England.

The English whisky GI was due to become active in 2024. On 19 February 2025, the GI entered into the three-month first phase of the consultation period, which ended on 19 May 2025 and a copy of the detailed GI was published. During the consultation phase, interested parties could send feedback or oppose the GI.

On 10 October 2025, the English whisky GI entered the final stages of its application; the EWG consulted those who opposed the GI, including the Scotch Whisky Association (SWA), though it was thought only minor changes would be needed. Tagore Ramoutar said: "As with any consultation, some elements may be subject to change depending on the final decision by [the Department for Environment, Food and Rural Affairs (DEFRA)]. However, we anticipate that any adjustments will be minor, with the key principles and structure remaining intact."

On 11 September 2026, the English whisky GI application was accepted and the GI was registered on 1 October 2026.

== Opposition ==
On 20 February 2025, the Scotch Whisky Association (SWA) released a statement rejecting the definition of English single malt. The SWA argue this is inconsistent with the reputation of single malt and would affect Scotch whisky. The SWA was due to send an official submission of opposition to DEFRA which they say would safeguard the quality of single malt Scotch whisky and other single malts in the U.K.

On 20 February 2025, several members of the Scottish Government, including Scottish Rural Affairs Secretary Mairi Gougeon and John Swinney, the First Minister of Scotland, made public statements rejecting the definition of single malt outlined in the English whisky GI. The Scottish First Minister has said he would make all necessary representation to protect the Scotch whisky industry.

On 15 September 2026, in response to the Secretary of State for DEFRA accepting the English whisky GI application, Wendy Chamberlain, the MP for North East Fife and the chair of the All-Party Parliamentary Group for Scotch Whisky, made a statement in the UK Parliament condemning the decision and reiterated previous objections to the English definition of single malt. Chamberlain was joined by other MPs, including Brendan O'Hara and Shadow Secretary of State for Scotland Harriet Cross who raised concerns over the reputation of single malt, and Tim Farron who raised concerns over the criteria used to reach the decision.

== Support ==
On 21 February 2025, the EWG made a statement praising the progress of the English whisky GI as it moved to the consultation phase. In response to the SWA statement, the EWG pointed to the USA, EU and Welsh whisky GIs, and said the processes in the English whisky GI are consistent with the processes in those GIs. The statement also noted the unique history and charities of English whisky.

On 26 February 2025, Andrew Nelstrop, the Managing Director of the English Whisky Company, made a statement in support of the English whisky GI. Nelstrop called the SWA statement nonsense, saying other similar GIs, including that for Welsh whisky, used the same process and that in the sourcing of malt and grains, the English whisky GI is far more stringent than the Scotch whisky GI. Nelstrop also stated he thought the biggest threat facing Scotch whisky was the dumping of low-price scotch onto the market which devalues both Scotch whisky and other whiskies.

On 24 April 2025, Compass Box released Scot-Free, a blended, English, Vatted Malt whisky in support the English whisky GI.

On the 18 September 2026, Stephen Morgan, the Parliamentary under-secretary for DEFRA, defended the decision.

== Legal challenges ==
On 8 October 2026, Spirit of Birmingham and Circumstance Distillery lodged a formal appeal against the English whisky GI to the First-tier Tribunal citing rules around copper contact during distillation as the reason for the appeal.

The SWA also lodged an appeal with the First-tier Tribunal citing rules around the mashing and fermentation stages, which can take place offsite but must take place in England, as a reason for the appeal.

== See also ==
- List of whisky distilleries in England
- List of whisky brands in England
- List of independent English Whisky bottlers
- Food and Drink Industry in England
- List of United Kingdom food and drink products with protected status
