= English single malt =

Single malt whisky produced in England

English single malt is a single malt whisky produced in England and distilled at a single distillery.

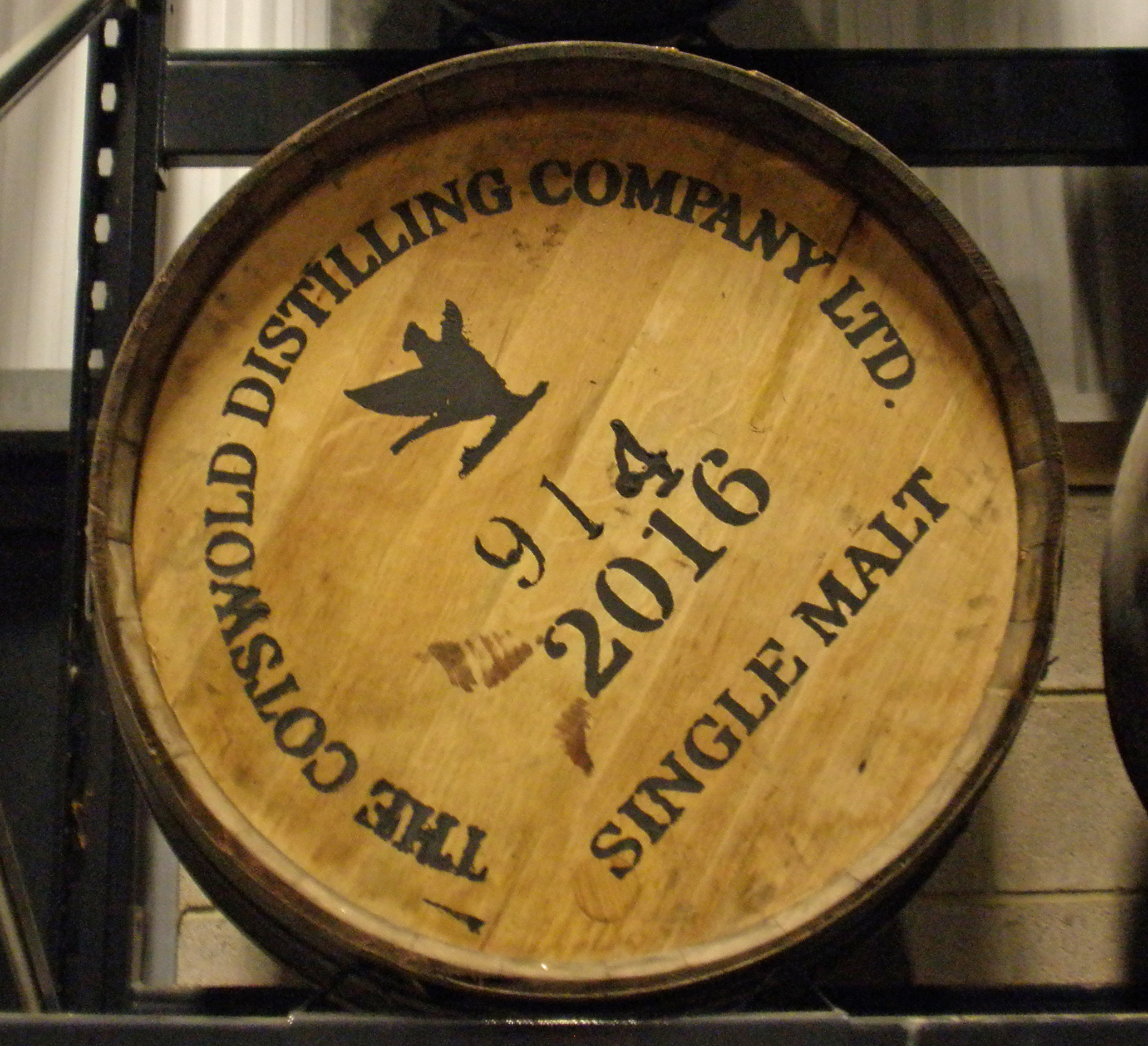
Example of English whisky single malt cask

There are currently 5 notable whisky brands that produce English single malt including Cotswolds, Foundry, Lakes, The English and Wire Works

There are currently 60 distilleries producing English whisky with a bulk of the production being English single malt.

== History ==
English single malt was first produced in England in 1636 with the establishment of the Worshipful Company of Distillers.

English single malt production ceased in 1900's due to competition from Scotch whisky and a shift towards gin production, though it was later revived in 2006 by the English Whisky Distillery.

In 2022 the English Whisky Guild submitted a geographical indication to legally define and protect the term English single malt.

On September 11 2026 the application was accepted and outlines the legal definition for English single malt.

== Definition ==
English single malt whisky is defined under the English whisky geographical indication and the British Standards Institute guidance (BS 8636).

These two documents outline that to be defined as an English single malt a whisky must be produced from malted barley sourced from the United Kingdom and English water. The wash is milled and fermented in England, then batch-distilled in pot stills with sufficient copper contact at a single distillery in England to a strength of less than 94.8% alcohol by volume. The spirit is matured in wooden casks of no more than 700 litres for a minimum of three years in England (Note: There is no specific wood type specified.) and bottled at a minimum of 40% alcohol by volume. No additional sweeteners or additives are permitted except for E150a caramel colouring.

== Dispute ==
=== Opposition ===
As of February 21, 2025 there has been an ongoing dispute in reference to the term English single malt, with multiple objections from different organisations including the First Minister of Scotland John Swinney, Cabinet Secretary for Rural Affairs Mairi Gougeon and the Director of Strategy and Communications at the Scotch Whisky Association Graham Littlejohn who released a statement opposing the definition of English single malt.

=== Support ===
The English whisky Guild has opposed the Scotch Whisky Associations statement explaining that ensuring quality, innovation and legal protection is at the heart of what they we do and further explaining that the English single malt definition allows distilleries to cooperate with breweries to create more innovative whiskies.

== Achievements ==
On September 8 2022 White Peaks Distillery sold its Wire Works Single malt whisky at auction for £15,000 (US$17,238), with this being the highest priced English single malt to be sold at auction.

On July 14 2025 The English Whisky Co released its Cask 1 (18 year old) single malt this being the oldest English single malt to be sold.

== See also ==
Wiki

- List of independent English whisky bottlers

External

English whisky GI

English whisky GI (notice)
