= Single malt =

Single malt may refer to:

- Single malt arrangement, a tax structure used by U.S. corporations in Ireland
- Single malt whisky, a malt whisky from a single distillery
  - Single malt Scotch, a malt whisky from a single Scotch distillery
  - English single malt
