= English Whisky Week =

Annual event in the England celebrating English whisky

- Status: Active
- Genre: English Whisky
- Date: 19 - 27 April
- Frequency: Annually
- Country: England
- Inaugurated: April 19, 2025
- Major events: distillery tours; whisky tastings (bottle); cask sampling; bottle releases
- Organiser: English Whisky Guild
- Website: English Whisky Week

English Whisky Week is an annual whisky event that celebrates English whisky.

== Participants ==
As of the April 25, 2025 the distilleries that are participating in the inaugural English Whisky Week include:

- Cotswolds Distillery

On the 25 April 2025 the Cotswolds Distillery offered reduced tours to Celebrate English Whisky Week.

- Wharf Distillery

On April 23, 2025, the Wharf distillery hosted an event to celebrate St George’s Day event to English Whisky Day and included whisky tours and cask tastings.

- Compass box (Note: Compass box is the only Scotch whisky producer that is participating in the English Whisky Week)

On April 23, 2025, Compass Box recruited Tom Skinner for an advertisement to highlight how “flavour is more important than paperwork” (Manish Rungta), with the advert being released in support of the English whisky GI.

On April 25, 2025, Compass Box released 61 bottles of Scot - Free an English vatted whisky in support of the English whisky GI with one bottle for each distillery producing English whisky.

- Spirit of Manchester

On April 25, 2025, the Spirit of Manchester Distillery offered mini distillery tours in celebration of English whisky Week.

== See also ==
- List of whisky distilleries in England
- List of whisky brands in England
- List of independent English whisky bottlers
