= List of whisky distilleries in England =

List of English whisky distilleries

There are 70 English whisky distilleries registered as of 15 April 2026, 27 of these distilleries are members of the English Whisky Guild (EWG).

As of 2025, The Cotswolds Distillery is the largest English distillery by production, with an annual production of 500,000 litres.

Princetown, Hawkridge, Wood Brothers, Mercia, Lakes, Ad Gerfrin, Spirit of Yorkshire, Witchmark and Copper Rivet are other notable English distilleries.

Map of English whisky distilleries as of 2026

== Active independent distilleries by region ==
As of 2026 are currently 35 distilleries across England with whisky available to purchase.

No	Name	Est	First Release	Status	Capacity	City/Town	Region
1.	Durham Distillery	2013	2026	pending release	1,000 litres	Durham	North East
2.	Weetwood Distillery	2018	2022	pending release	400 litres	Kelsall	North West
3.	Forest Distillery	2014	2022	pending release	500 litres	Macclesfield	North West
4.	Forgan Distillery	2017	2024	pending release	300 litres	Banks	North West
5.	Yorkshire Dales Distillery	2016	2027		1,500 litres	Catterick Garrison	Yorkshire and Humber
6.	Yorkshire Distilling Company	2024	TBA		3 x 5,000 litres	Goole	
7.	Old Bakery Distillery	2017	TBA		400 litres	Enfield, London Battersea, London	London
8.	Doghouse Distillery	2016	TBA		1,500 litres	Battersea, London	London
9.	Bimber	2015	2019		1000 litres	North Acton, London	London
10.	Maison Miles	2021	2024		100 litres	London	
11.	The London Distilling Co		2025				
12.	Maidstone Distillery	2018	2027		450 litres	Maidstone	South East
13.	Canterbury Brewers & Distillers	2018	2023	Active	500 litres	Canterbury	South East
14.	Pleasant Land Distillery	2022	TBA	pending release	1,200 litres	Aldington	South East
15.	Isle of Wight Distillery	2015	TBA	pending release	1,000 litres	Ryde	South East
16.	Wight Distillery	2023	2027	pending release	500 litres	Isle of Wight	South East
17.	Winchester Distillery	2014	2025	pending release	500 litres	Winchester	South East
18.	Hawkridge Distillers	2018	2027	pending release	5,000 litres	Newbury	South East
19.	Brightwell Bottle Distillery	2016	2020	Active	350 litres	Wallingford	South East
20.	Abingdon Distillery	2019	2026	pending release	650 litres	Abingdon Bamptono	South East
21.	Wood Brothers Distillery	2017	2028	pending release	5,000 litres	Bampton	South East
22.	Aedda's Farm Distillery	2023	TBA	pending release	1,750 litres	Adstock	South East
23.	Wylye Distillery	2022	TBA	pending release	1,250 litres	Wylye	South West
24.	Dartmoor Whisky Distillery	2015	2020	Active	1,400 litres	Bovey Tracey	South West
25.	Princetown Distillery	2015	TBA	pending release	13,500 litres	Princetown	South West
26.	Penrock Distillery	2020	TBA	pending release	135 litres	Liskeard	South West
27.	Scilly Isles Distillery	2019	2024	pending release	1000 litres	St Mary’s	South West
28.	Colwith Distillery	2016	2026	pending release	300 litres	Lanlivery	South West
29.	Rosemullion Distillery	2018	2023		450 litres	Falmouth	South West
30.	Healeys Distillery	2000	2011	Active	1,200 litres	Truro	South West
31.	Pocketful of Stones	2016	2022	Active	700 litres	Penzance	South West
32.	Wrecking Coast Distillery	2016	TBA	pending release	2,000 litres	Tintagel	South West
33.	Circumstance Distillery	2018	2022	Active	1,800 litres	Bristol	South West
34.	Spirit of Birmingham Distillery	2020	2024	Active	500 litres	Birmingham	West Midlands
35.	Mercia Whisky	2020	2025	pending release	5,000 litre	Wolseley Bridge	West Midlands
36.	Fen Spirits	2016	2023	Active	200 litres	Wisbech	East of England

=== Distilleries information ===
==== Bimber Distillery ====
The Park Royal, London based Bimber Distillery was founded in 2016. The alembic stills are Doris, a 1000-litre wash and Astraeus a spirit still of 600 litres made by Hoga. On 26 May 2016 the first cask was filled and three years later The First was available September 2019.

In 2017 a vodka was released followed by a rum the following year; gin is also part of the product line.

The sales director announced in June 2019 that they are looking for a new location to expand their production and increase the number of visitors.

==== Circumstance Distillery ====
Circumstance Distillery was founded by Liam Hirt in 2018. Based in the Whitehall district of Bristol, it is the sister distillery of Psychopomp Microdistillery. Circumstance Distillery prides itself on its 'Flavour first' approach, meaning every decision is made with flavour the only consideration. As a result of this approach they do not make a single malt whisky but use a variety of grains to produce single grain whiskies. They also use brewing yeasts instead of the traditional distilling yeasts and leave their fermentations running for 14 days. They released their first whisky in September 2022 which sold out in 9 minutes.

==== Lancaster Spirits Company ====
Lancaster Spirits Company was founded in 2022 by the team behind Lancaster Brewery to produce Whisky, Gin & Vodka using the wash from the brewery. Whisky Production commenced in July 2024 with their first whisky predicted to be released in 2027. Producing new-make spirit utilising Flagon Pale Ale Barley and fermented with their own Live Brewer's Yeast that kick starts a long fermentation of up to 168 hours. So far, the distillery has filled their new-make spirit in First-fill bourbon barrels, STR Rioja casks and Oloroso Sherry Hogsheads.

==== Dartmoor Whisky Distillery ====
Situated in Bovey Tracey, Simon Crow placed a 1200-litre ex-cognac still in the Old Town House to start the Dartmoor Whisky Distillery in 2017.

Guided by head distiller Frank McHardy, long time whisky industry veteran, the first whisky was casked on 3 February 2017. Three and half years later the first single malt whisky was released.

==== Durham Distillery ====
Durham Distillery was founded in 2014 as a gin distillery in Langley Park, County Durham and moved in 2020 to the Prince Bishops Shopping Centre in Durham, England.

They started the distillery with a 400-litre Hoga pot still, Lily, to produce gin, vodka and liqueur. With the investment of the Finance Durham Fund the distillery was planning to move to the city centre in 2018, what they were able to do in 2020. The production is the responsibility of the master distiller Jessica Tomlinson, a graduate from Heriot-Watt University who is involved from the start. Owing to the delayed move, no whisky was distilled before November 2019.

==== Hicks & Healey ====
In 2003 two of Cornwall's drinks producers, St Austell Brewery and Healey's Cyder Farm, announced that they had begun to produce the first whisky in England for almost a century.

In September 2011 the partnership released a 7-year old single malt and opted to use the spelling "whiskey". Whisky commentator and author of The Whisky Bible, Jim Murray, described the whisky as "among the best debut bottlings of the last decade".

==== Isle of Wight Distillery ====
The Isle of Wight Distillery is known for their gin and vodka brand Mermaid, but also started distilling whisky in December 2015. The founders Xavier Baker and Conrad Gauntlett started the distilling at Conrad's Rosemary Vineyard in 2014. Four years later, they moved to the Pondwell's pub The Wishing Well.

The stills have capacities of 100 and 300 litres. In spring 2019 they planned to install a custom designed 1,000 litre still. Big Bertha was operating in May 2020.

The first whisky was released in December 2018. For this single malt, the wort was brewed in Ryde at the Goddards Brewery where Xavier is managing director.

==== The London Distillery Company ====
The London Distillery Company was the first whisky Distillery in London for over 100 years. Originally, based in a former dairy cold room in Battersea, London until December 2015 before moving to a railway arch in Bermondsey.

TLDC was registered with Companies House in July 2011 by Darren Rook, and investor and former microbrewery owner, Nick Taylor.

Rook resigned as CEO in late 2017. His replacement failed multiple times to secure funding from new & existing investors. In January 2020, the company went into administration. The British Honey Company purchased the Dodd's Gin and Rye brands.

In January 2025, the company was revived by new owners Gleann Mor Spirits

==== Princetown Distillery ====
The company Princetown Distilleries filed their plans to build a whisky distillery in December 2016.

Located at an elevation of 1,400 ft, in Princetown, Dartmoor National Park it will outrank Dalwhinnie in that category. The design is by Gareth Roberts working for Organic Architects who previously was involved in the realisation of Ardnamurchan distillery, Dartmoor Distillery, Lindores Abbey Distillery, and Nc’nean distillery. Building started in August 2018.

== Active distilleries in the EWG in alphabetical order ==
As of 2026 there are 26 distilleries that are members of the English Whisky Guild

=== List of distilleries & milestones dates ===
No	Name of the distillery	Est	First Release	Status	Capacity	City/Town	Region
1.	Ad Gefrin Distillery	2022	2026	pending release	3,500 litres	Wooler	North East England
2.	Adnams	2010	2013	active	950 litres	Southwold	East of England
3.	Cooper King Distillery	2016	2023	active	900 litres	York	Yorkshire and the Humber
4.	Copper Rivet Distillery	2016	2020	active	2,600 litres	Chatham	South East England
5.	Cotswolds Distillery	2014	2017	active	4,100 litres	Stourton	West Midlands
6.	East London Liquor Co.	2014	2018	active	650 litres	Tower Hamlets, London	London
7.	Ellers Farm Distillery	2022	2026	pending release	2,500 litres	Stamford Bridge	Yorkshire and the Humber
8.	Elsham Wold Distillery	2019	2023	active	600 litres	Elsham Wolds	Yorkshire and the Humber
9.	Grasmere Distillery	2022	2027	pending release	500 litres	Grasmere	North West
10.	Fielden Distillery			Pending release			
11.	Henstone Distillery	2017	2021	active	1,000 litres	Welshpool	West Midlands
12.	Lancaster Spirits Company	2022	2027	active	500 litres	Lancaster	North West
13.	Ludlow Distillery	2014	2018	active	200 litres	Craven Arms	West Midlands
14.	Spirit of Yorkshire Distillery	2016	2019	active	3,500 litres	Hunmanby	Yorkshire and the Humber
15.	Ten Hides Distillery	2019	2027	active	300 litres	Devizes	South West
16.	The English Distillery	2006	2009	active	1,800 litres	Roudham	East of England
17.	The Lakes Distillery	2011	2018	active	3,600 litres	Setmurthy	North West
18.	Retribution Distilling Co	2019	2025		1,100 litres	Frome	South West
19.	Spirit of Manchester Distillery	2016	2026	pending release	750 litres	Manchester	North West
20.	Trevethan Distillery	2015	2026	pending release	600 litres	Saltash	South West
21.	Wharf Distillery	2011	2019		250 litres	Towcester	East Midlands
22.	White Peak Distillery	2016	2021		2,100 litres	Ambergate	East Midlands
23.	Whittaker’s Distillery	2015	2024		1,000 litres	Harrogate	Yorkshire and the Humber
24.	Witchmark Distillery	2022	2027		3,500 litres	Salisbury	South West
25.	West Midlands Distillery	2017	2025	pending release	1,000 litres	Rowley Regis	West Midlands
26.	Yarm Distillery	2018	2023	active	500 litres	Yarm	North East

=== Distilleries Information ===
==== Cooper King Distillery ====
Cooper King Distillery is an independent English distillery based in Sutton on the Forest, which was founded after the owners spent time living in Tasmania and became inspired by the Australian whisky industry.

Established in 2016 by founders Christopher Jaume and Abbie Neilson, the distillery started producing gin in early 2018 and casked their first single malt spirit in August 2019. They named the distillery after co-founder Chris Jaume's great-great-grandfather, Lieutenant Colonel Charles Cooper King, who traced the family's history back to Yorkshire in 1030 AD.

==== (Adnams) Copper House Distillery ====
The Copper House Distillery was built by the Southwold based brewer Adnams in 2010. Their first whisky was released in 2013. They also distill gin, vodka, bierbrand and brandy.

==== Copper Rivet Distillery ====
The Copper Rivet Distillery, based in a Grade II listed building in Chatham, Kent, was founded by Bob Russell and his sons Matthew and Stephen, in August 2016.

The distillery has three stills; Sandy (pot), Joyce (column), and Janet (gin). Janet was designed by head distiller Abhi Banik and was granted a patent in 2019. For the production of Single Malt Whisky Sandy is used; it can load 2000 litres of wash. Joyce is for the Vela Vodka and the base alcohol of Dockyard Gin. Janet adds the flavours to the gin through maceration and vapour distillation.

The first whisky release, branded Malthouse, was launched in November 2020.

==== The Cotswolds Distillery ====
The Cotswolds Distillery was established in 2014, and was the first full-scale distillery to be located in the Cotswolds Area of Outstanding Natural Beauty (AONB). Situated in a 5-acre (2 ha) site in Stourton in Warwickshire, its focus is distilling single malt whisky.

On July 27, 2023, The Cotswolds distillery was named the best distillery in the U.K and Ireland

==== East London Liquor Company ====
East London Liquor Company is based in a building that was once a glue factory in Bow Wharf, East London. The company was founded by former actor Alex Wolpert in 2014. Head distiller Tom Hills makes single malt, rye, wheat whisky, gin, and wheat vodka with two 450–650 litres Holstein stills,

The London Rye (42% rye, 58% barley) was first released in December 2018. In 2019 a single malt was released, followed in 2020 by the London Wheat (35% unmalted wheat, 30% heirloom malted barley, 30% malted wheat, 5% corn).

In May 2018, £1.5 million was raised to enlarge the whisky production.

==== Henstone Distillery ====
Chris and Alexandra Toller founded Henstone distillery in 2017 with the aid of the European Agricultural Fund for Rural Development They use their 1000 litre Kothe still Hilda, to produce whisky, brandy, gin, vodka and rum.

Their first whisky was released on 23 January 2021.

==== The Lakes Distillery ====
The distillery is repurposing an old Victorian farmstead on the shore of Bassenthwaite Lake in the Lake District National Park. It was founded by Paul Currie, ex-Arran Distillery, Alan Rutherford, Nigel Mills, and master distiller Chris Anderson. The Heriot-Watt graduate Dhavall Gandhi was appointed master blender in 2016, his previous position was at The Macallan.

The distillery opened on 15 December 2014, a few days after they put the 5,500 litre McMillan stills into production. On 22 July 2015, Princess Anne formally opened the distillery. In 2019 the distillery announced an expansion plan that would nearly double their production capacity.

Initially the company released a blended whisky The One before they released their first self-produced The Lakes Genesis on 29 June 2018. In May 2018 an annual release, Quatrefoil, was introduced (Faith, Hope, Luck, Love). A brand was restyled in September 2019 with the release of The Whiskymaker's Reserve No.1.

Besides whisky the distillery also makes gin and vodka with a 1,000 litre still.

==== Ludlow Distillery ====
Founded by Mike Hardingham in 2009 to distill brandy from his vineyard using a 200-litre Kothe still in Clee St. Margaret's. In 2014 they started to distill whisky. The first peated version was released in 2018 named Young Prince, commemorating Edward V of England who was based in Ludlow Castle. In 2020, the distillery was joined with Ludlow Gin, and relocated in 2023 to Ludlow Farm Shop.

They also produce Brandy, Apple Brandy and Eaux de vie.

==== The Oxford Artisan Distillery ====
The Oxford Artisan Distillery (TOAD) is located next to the Headington's South Park in the old city council depot at Cheney Farm. In 2017, Tom Nicolson and Tagore Ramoutar founded the distillery where master distiller Cory Mason started distilling rye whisky, gin, and vodka.

Four organic farms, all near Oxford, supplies the distillery with rye, wheat, and barley.

The largest still "Nautilus" has a capacity of 2,400 litres with a column of 42 plates; a smaller 500-litre still known as "Nemo". Both were built by South Devon Railway Engineering.

In Spring 2021, the distillery launched its rye whisky, produced by the Portuguese master distiller, Chico Rosa.

==== The Spirit of Manchester Distillery ====
Now based underneath renovated former railway arches on Watson Street in Manchester, the distillery was founded in 2016 by owners Jen and Seb, initially beginning with the production of gin from their dining room in Chorlton.

Production of whisky began in 2022 and currently takes place on their carbon neutral, 750L pot still 'Leo', named after Leonardo Fibonacci and his golden ratio, tying into the brand name of 'One Point Six Whisky'.

==== Spirit of Yorkshire Distillery ====
Based in Hunmanby, near Scarborough, North Yorkshire. Partnered with the Woldtop Brewery Co., this distillery has been producing single malt since 2016.

From the barley grown on their farm and the water from their estate they make a single malt, using oil-fired Forsyth Stills. The spirit still is 3,500 L while the wash still is 5,000 L, with which they aim to produce 80,000 litres per annum.

Their single malt whisky has been bottled since 2019 under the Filey Bay label. Like many of the other distilleries that used the consultancy of the late Jim Swan (1941-2017), the company offers STR expression.

==== The English Distillery ====
The English Distillery in Roudham, Norfolk, began production in 2006 and was the first registered whisky distillery in England for over a century,

The company founder James Nelstrop described it as a 45-year-old dream to make whisky in Norfolk and said that barley has historically been sent from Norfolk to Scotland to make whisky.

==== White Peak Distillery ====
Near the village of Ambergate, on the bank of the River Derwent, Derbyshire, there is an old wire factory. Claire and Max Vaughan started the White Peak Distillery in 2017, in one of the buildings of this complex.

The first spirit for the whisky is casked in the spring of 2018. In the meantime the progress can be followed by the single malt spirit that is released. Gin and rum are also part of the companies product range.

==== Whittaker's Distillery ====
The Whittakers intended to brew beer but a study at Heriot Watt changed his mind. The distillery started in 2015, making gin with two 100 litre Hillbilly stills on their farm in Dacre Banks. The first step into whisky production was taken in 2018, when an expansion plan was announced. That distillery was formally opened by the Earl of Harewood in August 2019.

The new still is made by ABE and has a 1,000 litre capacity.

==== Wharf Distillery ====
Wharf Distillery is an independent small batch distillery founded in 2012 by Laurence Conisbee initially to produce apple brandy, Æppel Drenc, from its own cider (Virtual Orchard Cider).

The distillery uses a 300-litre hand-beaten copper pot alembic still from Portugal and a German Kothe still. Their range now includes gin Safine Drenc, vodka Gadan Drenc, Fyr Drenc (a grain spirit made from malted barley), and apple brandy Æppel Drenc

Their first whisky, named Cattle Creep after the narrow tunnel passing under the nearby Grand Union Canal, was released in January 2019. Matured in a 55L Madeira cask, this very limited release was bottled at 42.9% with a cask strength Distiller's Cut at 58.8% being made available in June 2019. The release of their whisky made them England's smallest whisky distillery.

The distillery takes its name from its original location on Galleon Wharf alongside the Grand Union Canal, although it is now located in the market town of Towcester, Northamptonshire.

== Proposed ==
On August 24 2026, Spirit Capital received planning permission from Cornwall Council to build The Bodmin Jail Distillery on the 18th century Bodmin Jail site in Cornwall which is valued at £80 million (US$109.2m), will create 15 jobs and will produce Cornish whisky a regional designated type of English whisky.

== Closed or abandoned distilleries ==
=== Independent Distilleries ===
Distillery	Location	Region	Closed / Abandoned	Revived
Lakesland Distillery	Staveley	North West	2007	N/A
The York Distillery	York	East Midlands	2019	N/A
The London Distillery Co	London	London	2020	2025
Chase Distillery	Hereford		2025 (Note: The English whisky stock was purchase by the Chase Family and moved to Rosemaund Farm Distillery)	N/A

==== Lakesland Distillery ====
An unfruitful initiative of Harold Currie co-founder of Arran Distillery and his son Andrew Currie. Harold's other son, Paul Currie, would found The Lakes Distillery.

Andrew published his plans in 2004 for a distillery in the old Bobbin Mill in Staveley. In 2006 work on the distillery was progressing, aiming for a Christmas opening. However, in 2007 the project was abandoned.

== Gallery ==
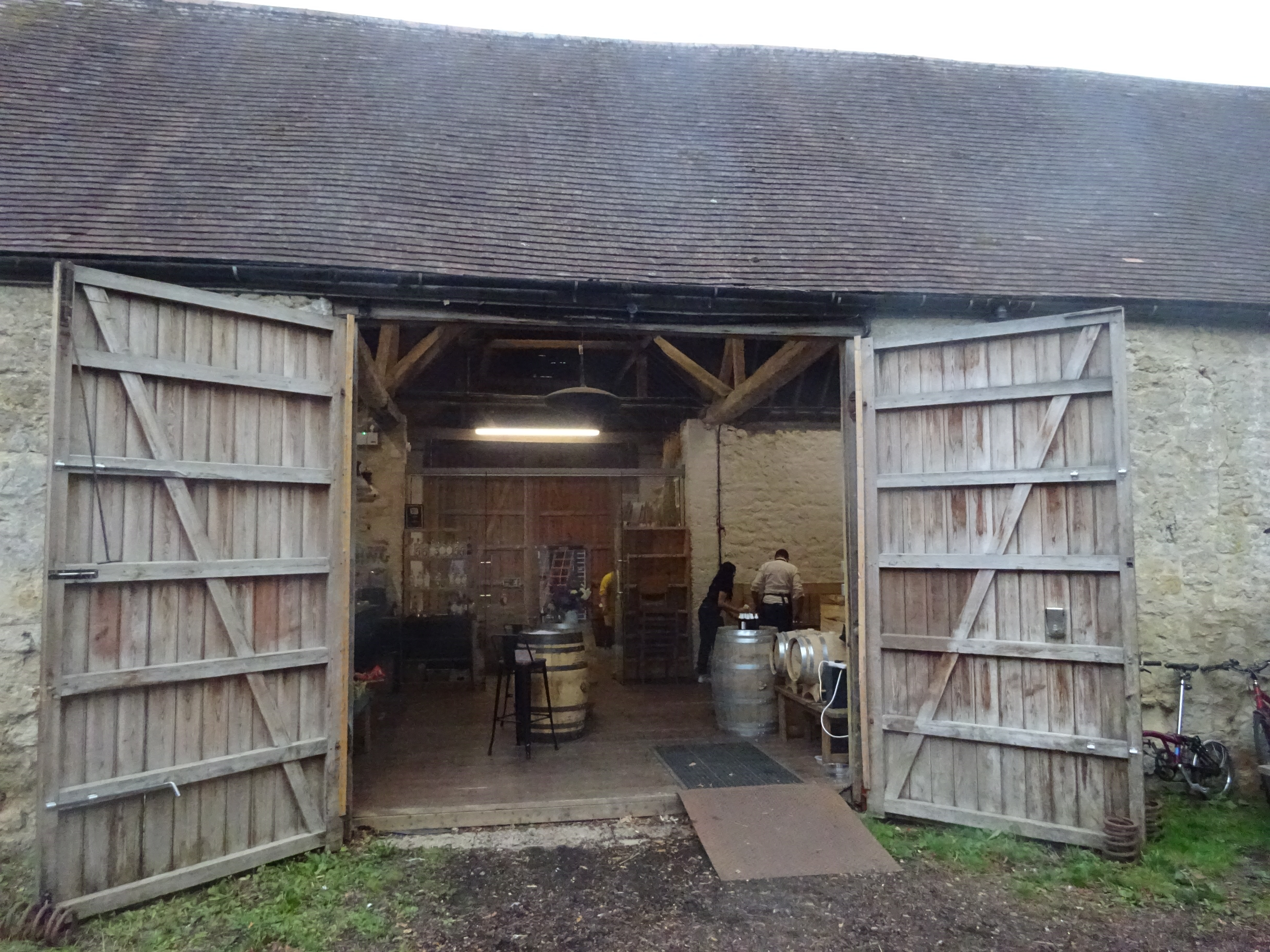
Oxford Artisan Distillery

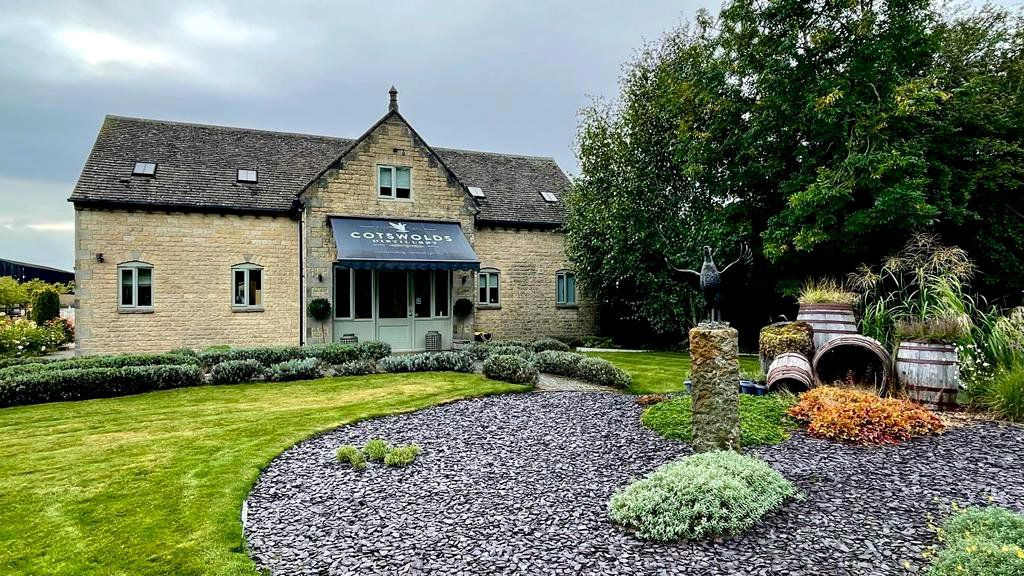
Cotswolds Distillery

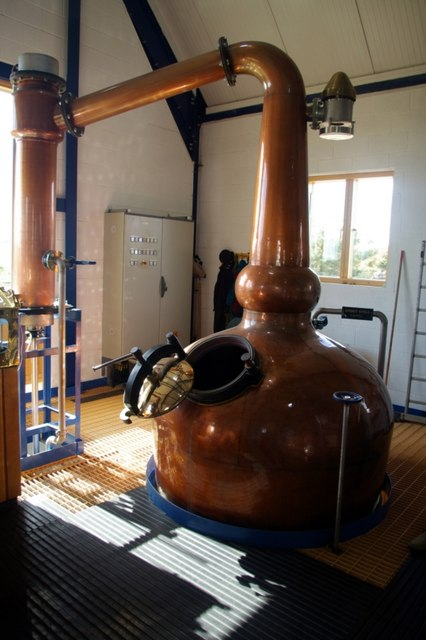
St George's Distillery (spirit still)

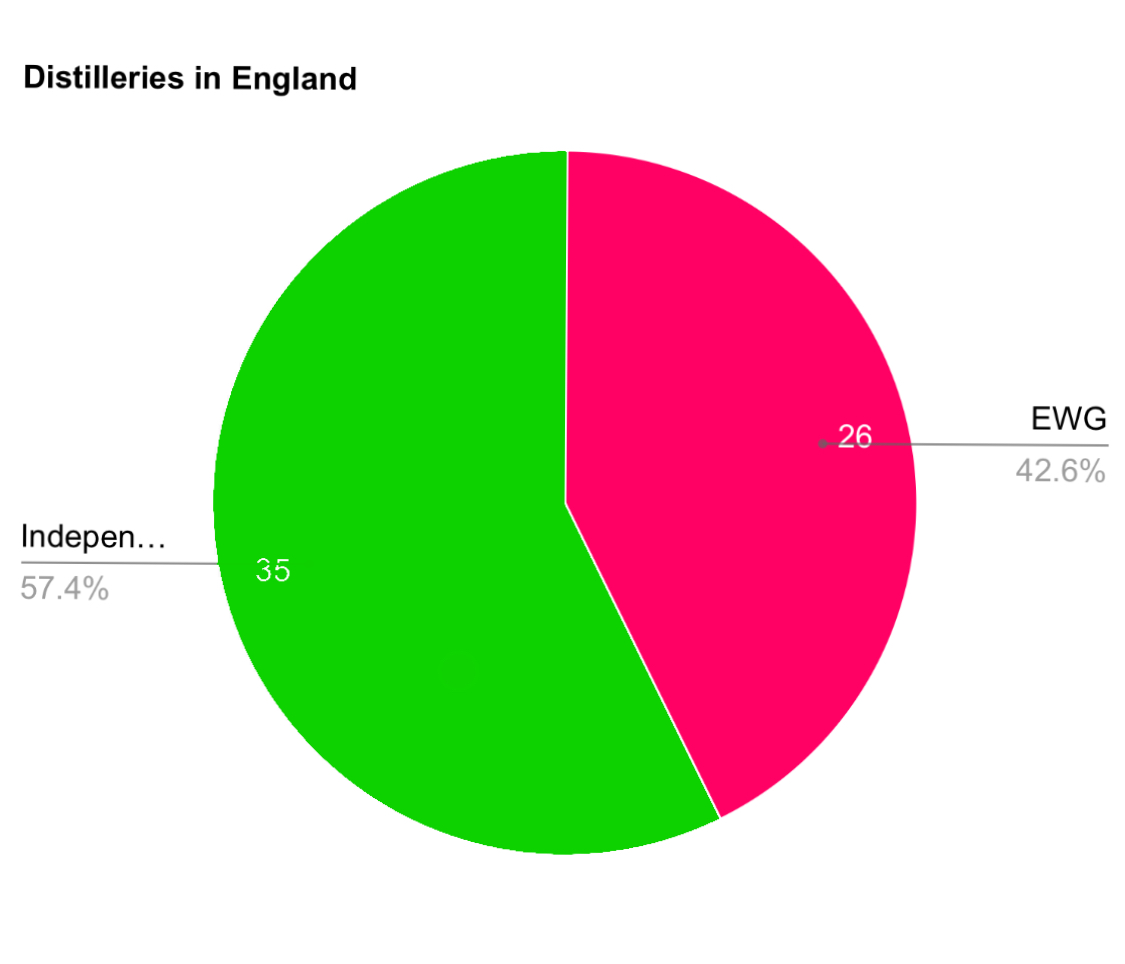
English whisky distilleries (% of independent and EWG)

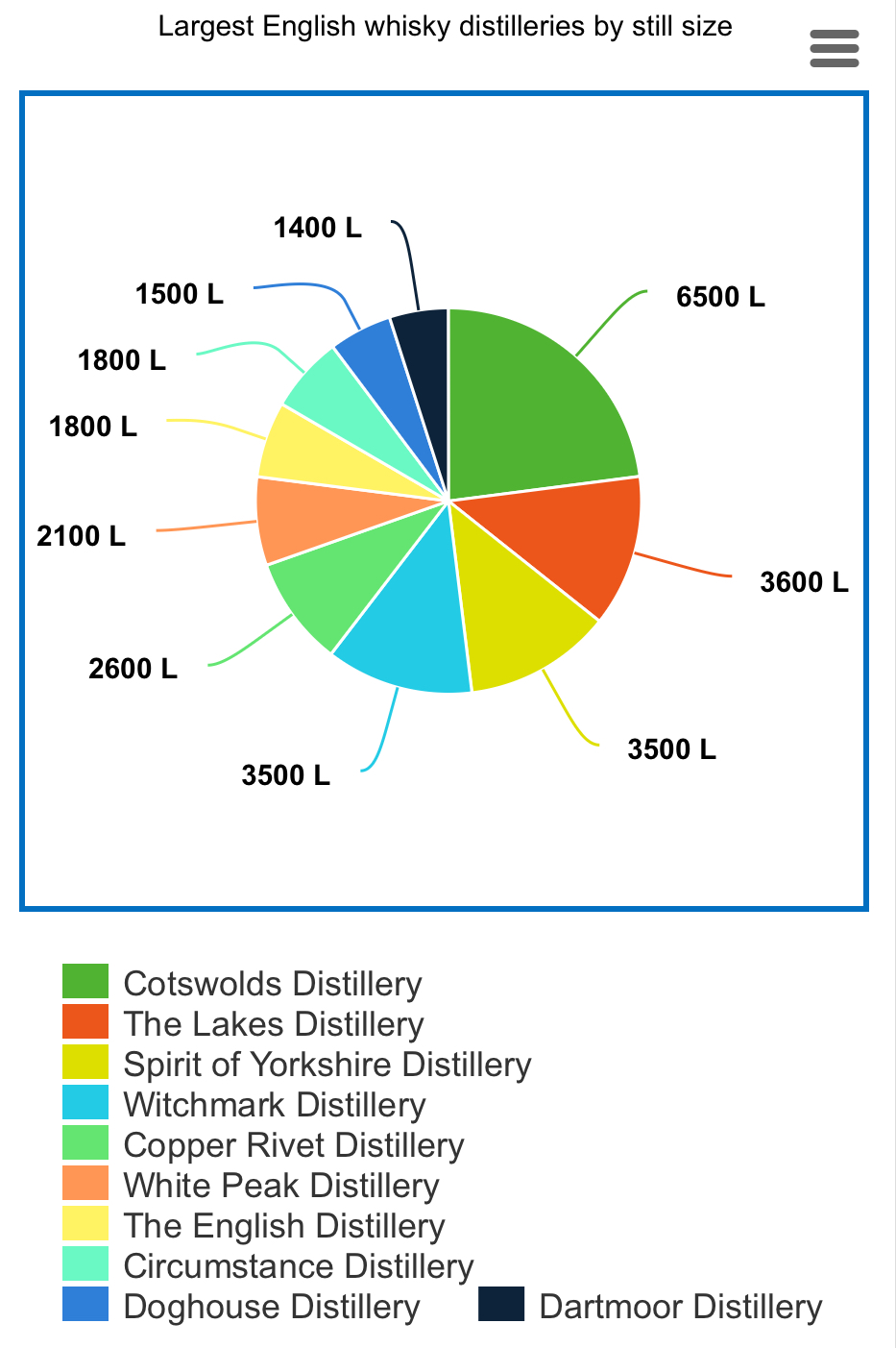
English whisky distilleries (by still size)

== See also ==
=== Economic ===
- Economy of England
- Food and drink industry in England

=== Liquors ===
- Gin

Whisky

- List of whisky brands in England
- Outline of whisky
- List of whisky brands
- List of British Standards
- English Whisky Week

=== Wine ===
- English sparkling wine
- English wine cask units
