= List of independent English Whisky bottlers =

There are currently 18 independent English whisky bottlers.

== Bottlers ==
=== Independent bottlers ===
No	Bottler	Distillery (ies)	Whisky (ies)	Cite
1.	Kindred Spirit	The English Whisky Co	Kindred Sprit English Whisky Co Peated Single Malt	
2.	Blackadder	The English Whisky Co	Blackadder English Whisky Co Single Malt	
3.	The Whisky Baron	The English Whisky Co	The Whisky Baron English Whisky Co Single Malt	
4.	Claxtons	The English Whisky Co	Claxtons The Single Cask English Whisy Co Single Malt	
5.	Cadenhead’s	The English Whisky Co	Cadenhead’s English Whisky Co 12 y/o Single Malt	
6.	North Star	The English Whisky Co	North Star English Whisky Co 11 y/o Single Malt	
7.	Watt Whisky	The English Whisky Co	Watt Whisky English Whisky Co 12 y/o Single Malt	
8.	That Boutique-y	The English Whisky Co	That Boutique-y English Whisky Co 10 y/o Single Malt	
8.	That Boutique-y	The Cotswolds Distillery	That Boutique-y The Cotswolds 3 y/o Single Malt	
8.	That Boutique-y	Adnams	That Boutique-y Adnams Single Malt Whisky	
9.	Master of Malt	Adnams	Master of Malt Adnams Single Cask Single Malt	
10.	Master of Malt	Circumstance Distillery	Master of Malt Circumstance Distillery Single Grain	
10.	Master of Malt	English Whisky Co	Master of Malt English Whisky Co Single Malt	
11.	Berry Bros & Rudd	The Oxford Artisan Distillery	Berry Bros & Rudd The Oxford Artisan Distillery English Rye Single Cask	
11.	Berry Bros & Rudd	Wire Works	Berry Bros Wire Works Single Cask Single Malt	
11.	Berry Bros & Rudd	Spirit of Yorkshire	Berry Bros Spirit of Yorkshire Single Cask Single Malt	
12.	The Heart Cut	East London Liquor Co	The Heart Cut East London Liquor Co Rye Whisky Single Cask	
13.	East London Liquor Co	The Whisky Show 2023	The Whisky Show 2023 The East London Liqour Co Single Rye	
14.	Thompson Bros	Bimber	Thompson Bros Bimber 3 y/o Single Malt	
15.	Artful Dodger	Bimber	Artillery Dodger Bimber London New Make Spirit Drink	
16.	The Whisky Lounge	Bimber	The Whisky Lounger Bimber Single Malt	
17.	Rebel Distillers	London Distillers Company	Rebel Distillers London Distillers Company Triple Sec Bourbon	
18.	The Dram Team	Adnams	The Dram Team Adnams Rye Single Malt	
18.	The Dram Team	Bimber	The Dram Team Bimber Single Malt	
18.	The Dram Team	Circumstance	The Dram Team Circumstance Barley	
18.	The Dram Team	Copper King	The Dram Team Copper King New Make	
18.	The Dram Team	Copper Rivet	The Dram Team Copper Rivet Sons of the Seas	
18.	The Dram Team	Cotswolds	The Dram Team Cotswolds Single Malt	
18.	The Dram Team	Dartmoor Whisky	The Dram Team Dartmoor Whisky Single Malt	
18.	The Dram Team	East London	The Dram Team East London Rye	
18.	The Dram Team	Filey Bay	The Dram Team Filey Bay Single Malt	
18.	The Dram Team	Forest whisky	The Dram Team Forest whisky Single Malt	
18.	The Dram Team	Henstone Distillery	The Dram Team Henstone Distillery New Make	
18.	The Dram Team	Hicks and Healeys	The Dram Team Hicks and Healeys Single Malt	
18.	The Dram Team	Ludlow	The Dram Team Ludlow Whisky Co Single Malt	
18.	The Dram Team	English Whisky Co	The Dram Team English Whisky Co Single Malt	
18.	The Dram Team	The Lakes	The Dram Team The Lakes Single Malt	
18.	The Dram Team	The Norfolk	The Dram Team The Norfolk	
18.	The Dram Team	White Peak	The Dram Team White Peak Single Malt	
18.	The Dram Team	The Wharf Distillery	The Dram Team The Ward Distillery Single Malt	

== See also ==
- English whisky
- English Whisky Guild
- List of whisky distilleries in England
- List of whisky brands in England
