= List of whisky brands in England =

List of English whisky brands

There are currently 24 different whisky brands in England with the English Co, Bimber, The Lakes and Cotswolds being the largest brands of English whisky by production.

Examples of English whisky brands

== Brands ==
No	Brands	Distillery	No of whiskies released	Whisky type	Most popular whisky	Special releases	Citations
1. 2.	Oxford Rye Red Red Rye	The Oxford Artisan Distillery	12	Rye	Red Red Rye Heritage Grains The Dissertation	Anniversary Edition; 1. Oxford Rye Purple Grain Whisky 2017; 2. The Oxford Artisan Distillery Oxford Rye Whisky	
2.	The Lakes Whiskymakers	The Lakes Distillery	79	Single malt	Infinity Single Malt Whisky Reserve No 7	Reflections Single Malt Whisky Anniversary Release	
3.	Bimber	Bimber Distillery	251	Single Malt	Apogee; Pure Malt Whisky Ex-Bourbon Oak Casks Batch No. 4	Bimber The Coronation of King Charles III Edition Single Malt Whisky	
4.	London Rye	East London Liquor Company Rye	12	Rye whisky	London Rye Whisky		
5. 6.	The English Norfolk Nog	St George's Distillery	463	Malt Grain Single malt	Single Cask Release Malt Amathus Selection Norfolk Nog Single Grain Whisky The English Sherry Cask	1. The English Lest We Forget Single Malt Whisky 2019; 2. The English Lest We Forget Single Malt Whisky 2022; The Fine Drop Single Malt Whisky 2023	
7.	Cotswolds	Cotswolds Distillery	120	Single malt	Cotswolds Single Malt Whisky Cotswolds Single Malt Peated Cask	Cotswolds 2017 Highgrove Coronation; 1. Ex Red Wine STR Single Malt Whisky; 2. Ex Red Wine STR & Bourbon Single Malt Whisky	
8.	Sacred	Sacred Spirits	2	Single malt	Sacred Peated English Whisky		
10.	Dartmoor		16		Dartmoor Single Malt Whisky		
11.	Filey Bay	Spirit Of Yorkshire Distillery	7	Single Malt	Filey Bay Single Malt Whisky Filey Bay IPA Finish Batch #2		
12. 13.	Wire Works White Peaks	White Peaks Distillery	40 21	Single malt	White Peak Cask Aged Rum Wire Works Caduro Single Malt Whisky Wire Works Whisky Over Smoke Wire Works Whisky Virgin Oak		
14.	Adnams Rye	Adnams	26	Single malt	Adnams Single Malt Whisky		
15.	Anno		7	Blended	Anno Blended Whisky		
16.	Forest Whisky		92	Single malt	Forest Single Malt Whisky Forest Whisky Blend Number 26		
17.	Gulliver's 47	Gulliver's		Single malt	Gulliver's 47 Single Malt Whisky		
18	Wharf Distillery				Equinox		
19.	The Cheshire	Weetwood Distillery	4	Single malt	The Cheshire Single Malt Second Release		
20.	Masthouse	Copper Rivet Distillery	13	Malt	Column Malt Whisky		
21.	Foundry	Canterbury Brewers & Distillers	1	Single malt	Foundry Capstan Single Malt Foundry Streetlight Single Malt		
22.	Debt Collector	Doghouse Distillery	4	Bourbon (bourbon style)	Debt Collector 01 & 02 year old, Debt Collector Unaged Moonshine & Debt Collector Whisky		
23.	Sour Mash	Penrock Distillery		Bourbon (bourbon style)			
24.	Never Say Die	White Peaks	73	Bourbon (bourbon style)			
25.	Iron Ridge	Hawkridge Distillery		Single malt	Hammond Iron Ridge Single Malt		

== See also ==
=== Economic ===
- Economy of England
- Food and drink industry in England

=== Liquors ===
- Gin

Whisky

- Outline of whisky
- List of whisky brands
- List of British Standards
- English Whisky Week

=== Wine ===
- English sparkling wine
- English wine cask units
