= English whisky =

Whisky distilled in England

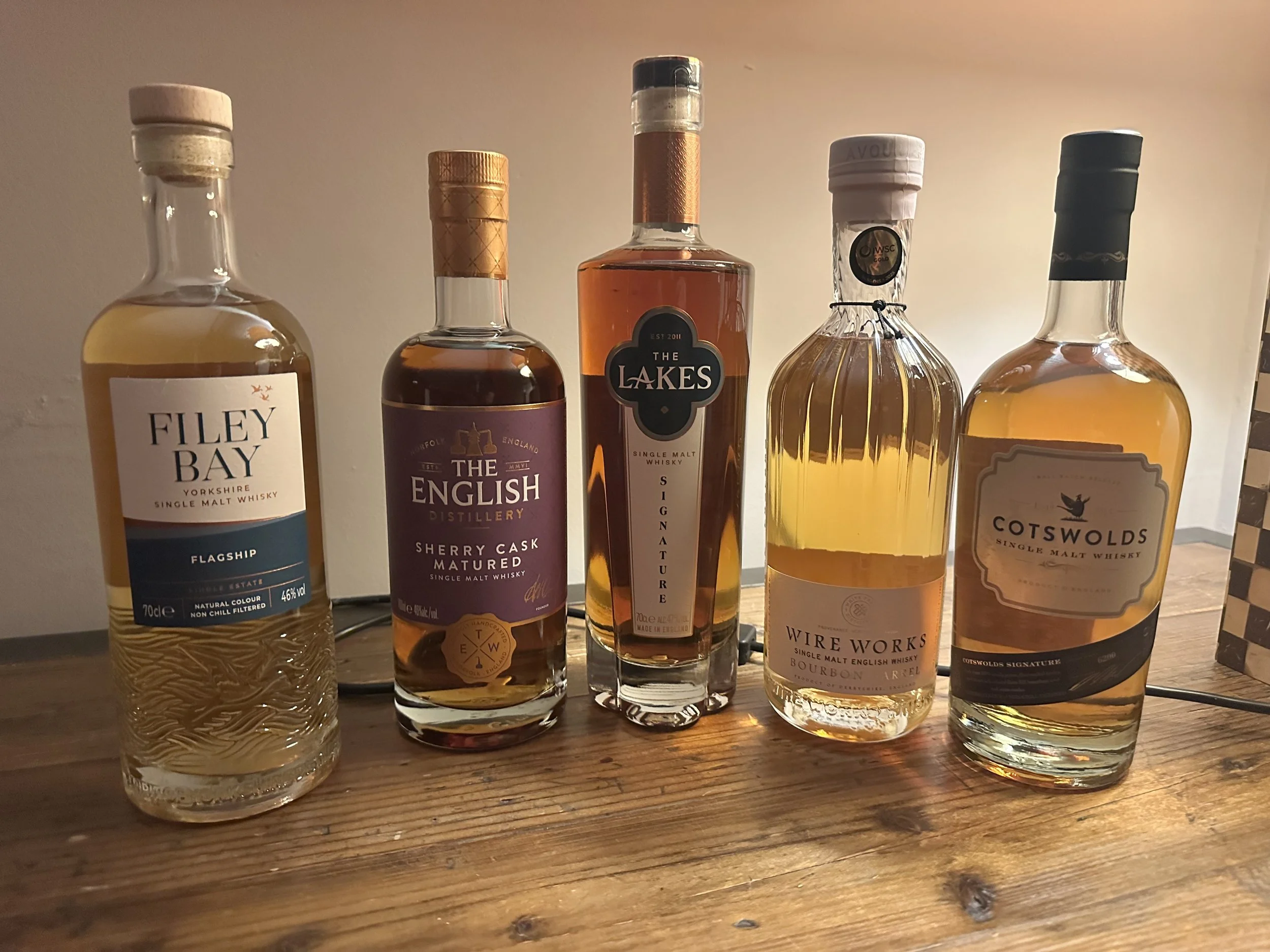
- Bottles of various English whiskies
- Type: Distilled beverage
- Origin: England
- Introduced: c. 1636 (Note: Whisky has been made in England since at least 1636, when the Worshipful Company of Distillers was granted a charter for producing the spirit. By the 1800s, there were distilleries in Liverpool, Bristol, London and elsewhere.); Revival; 2003; 23 years ago (Note: England ceased its production of whisky for 100 years until it was reintroduced in 2003)
- Discontinued: 1905
- Alcohol by volume: 40% – 70.2%
- Proof (US): 80°–140° US / 70°–122.40° UK
- Colour: Pale yellow to Caramel
- Flavour: sweet: vanilla, oats and fruit savoury: rye bread and herbs spicy: cooking spices, pepper, gingerbread and citrus smoky: oak, peat, and leather
- Ingredients: Malt, Grains, Water
- Variants: single malt, single grain, blended
- Related products: Scotch, Irish, Welsh
- Website: www.englishwhisky.co.uk

English whisky or whiskey (Note: The English whisky GI allows for two spellings whisky (traditional) and whiskey (alternative) with Hick and Healey using the alternative spelling) is malt or grain whisky that is produced in England using cereal grains and water.

Whisky has been made in England since at least 1636. By the 1800s, distilleries were present in Liverpool, Bristol, and London. Production of English whisky started declining in the 1700s and ceased when Lea Valley, the last operational whisky distillery in England, moved to Scotland due to competition from Scottish distilleries. Commercial production of whisky was revived in 2003, and has been produced since then. English whisky is categorised as a new world whisky and is represented by the English Whisky Guild. As of 2026, there are 24 English whisky brands. The oldest-released bottle of English whisky is The English Founders Private Cellar 16 Years Old Port Cask.

== History ==
In 1636, the Worshipful Company of Distillers was granted a charter to produce spirits, including whisky. In 1825, the Chancellor of the Exchequer reduced the duty on alcohol and permitted distillers to sell directly to the public. The government believed this would encourage distillers to produce higher-quality spirits, eliminating the dangerous rectification process, which involves removing impurities from the spirit, and increase distillers' prosperity, generating revenue for the Treasury. The reduction in alcohol duty led to a near doubling of English spirit consumption and solidified England's reputation for distilling. Along with the introduction of cask-based aging, the removal of duties boosted demand for English spirits, accounting for around 16% of England's revenue by 1885.

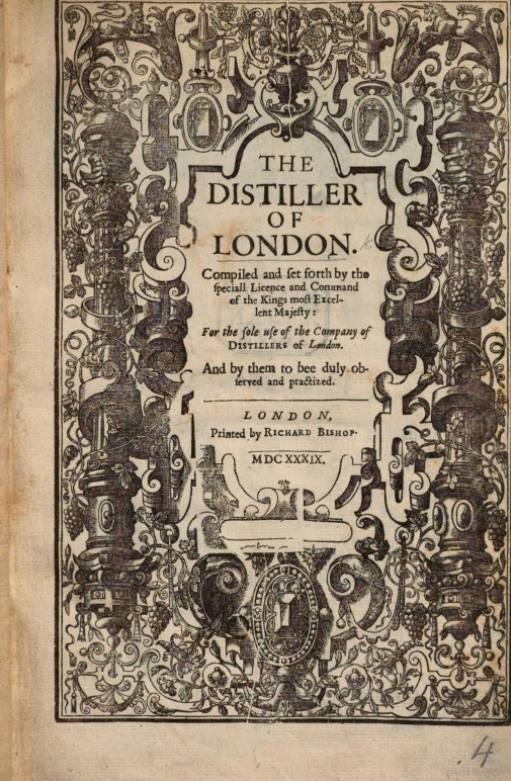
The Distiller of London title page

The 1887 book The Whisky Distilleries of the United Kingdom by Alfred Barnard lists the following English distilleries:

- Lea Valley Distillery, Stratford, Essex (founded in the late 19th century) — produced both grain and malt whisky.
- Bank Hall Distillery, Liverpool — produced grain and malt whisky.
- Bristol Distillery, Bristol (founded in the 17th century) — produced grain whisky which was "sent to Scotland and Ireland to make a Blended Scotch and Irish whisky, for whisky purpose it is specially adapted, and stands in high favour".
- Vauxhall Distillery in Vauxhall, Liverpool (founded in 1781) — produced grain whisky.

In 1903, Lea Valley Distillery, which was owned by The Distillers Company, moved production to Scotland due to the growing popularity and production of gin and Scotch whisky. This led to a 100-year gap in English whisky production, which was revived in 2005 when the English Whisky Co. began production and released its first malt whisky variety in 2009. In 2013, The London Distillery Company began production of the first single-malt whisky in London since Lea Valley Distillery closed in 1903. Three more English distilleries, The Cotswolds Distillery, Ludlow Distillery, and The Lakes Distillery, were producing whisky by 2014.

In 2016, Cooper King Distillery released the first edition of the English Whisky Map, since when seven editions, the latest being released in December 2025, have been published. In May 2022, the English Whisky Guild was established to protect and promote English whisky.

== Regulations ==
English whisky producers adhere to the English whisky GI and the British Standards Institute (BSI) guidance BS8636, which was released on 12 September 2023 and applies to English, Scotch, Welsh, and Irish whisky. (Note: A submission has been made to obtain a Geographical Indication for the term "English Whisky") These two documents set out the criteria for whisky production and packaging. They specify that whisky must be matured in wooden casks for three years, contain no additives or sweeteners except for E150a caramel colour, be matured to a minimum ABV of 40%, and have a final ABV of less than 94.8%. Previously English whisky producers had been following EU Regulation (2019/787).

Front page of the English whisky GI

There are four active intellectual property trademarks for individual distillers, including The English Whisky Co. and English Whisky from English oak, which are processed though the United Kingdom Intellectual Property Office.

An application to establish an English whisky GI began in February 2022 to outline statutory definition and labelling rules for English whisky, with a stipulation requiring grains and water to be locally sourced. In 2025 the English whisky GI entered the final stages with only minor changes necessary for completion, and on September 11 2026 the application was accepted. On November 12 2026 the English whisky varification launched requiring producers that use English whisky/whiskey to register with the UK spirits verification scheme and pay £250 per distillery every two years.

The English whisky GI is a legal framework that includes malt whisky and grain whisky, and the sub-divisions single and blended. Requirements for English whisky include the use of UK-grown cereal grains and water "from a supply local to the distillery for mashing and distilling"; milling and fermentation in England; distillation in England in a still with sufficient copper contact to an ABV of less than 94.8%; maturation in wooden casks of no more than 700 litres for at least three years, reaching a minimum ABV of 40%; and the exclusion of additional sweeteners and additives except for E150a caramel. All stages of production except bottling must take place in England.

The English whisky GI specifies that to be defined and labelled as an English single malt, products must be made using English malted barley and distilled in England in a pot still with sufficient copper conduct at a single distillery, although fermentation and mashing are permitted to take place off site.

The definition of "single malt" in the English whisky GI has led to a disagreement with the Scotch Whisky Association and has led to an appeal being submitted to the First Tier General Regulatory Chamber.

== Production stages ==
English whisky has more regulatory flexibility than traditional whisky producers, enabling more experimentation with styles, grain selection, cask ageing and blending techniques.

=== Sourcing ===
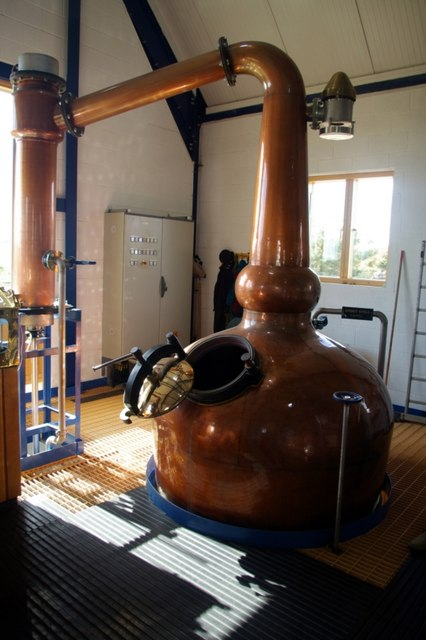
Spirit still at St George's Distillery

Nearly all English whisky distilleries source barley from local farms and malt from malt houses in England; some distilleries occasionally source malt from Scotland. This flexibility in sourcing is reflected in the proposed English whisky Geographical indication (GI) which requires all cereal grain to be sourced from the United Kingdom, rather than being restricted to England.

=== Mashing and milling ===
English whisky distilleries may obtain wash, also known as distillers beer, from nearby breweries for distillation into whisky; any wash produced off-site must be made in England.

=== Fermentation ===
English whisky distilleries have experimented with different types of yeast fermentation and use their brewing experience to craft more-original flavours of whisky. Notable examples include Grasmere Distillery, which uses ale yeasts and cold fermentation for fruity new-make spirits; Lancaster Spirits Co., employing 200-year-old yeast and slow fermentation for chemically aromatic, complex whisky that often bottled as new make; and Cotswolds Distillery, which uses two yeast strains to produce fresh, fruity spirits before maturation.

== Production and trade value ==
According to a March–April 2023 survey by the English Whisky Guild, there were 38,000 casks of English whisky maturing in distillery warehouses at that time. Distilleries estimated the laying down of around 50,000 casks by the end of 2024. Ninety-seven percent of distilleries were producing single malt whisky, and around a quarter were also producing whiskies from other grains such as rye. The total value of the maturing stock was estimated at more than £1 billion.

A June 2024 inaugural annual report by the English Whisky Guild stated English whisky sales in the previous year were 50,000 nine-litre (2.0 imp gal; 2.4 US gal) casks. Forty percent of sales were international and English whisky distilleries received approximately 250,000 visitors that year. The combined domestic and international sales value was reported as £1 billion.

Figures released in July 2024 by Speciality Foods indicated English whisky accounted for 26% of new spirit products listed over a twelve-month period and more than 50% of the volume of English spirits products listed since June 2023.

An October-2025 second annual report by the English Whisky Guild estimated the value of maturing English whisky stock at £1 billion (approximately $1.33 billion). Annual production was reported at five million litres (1,100,000 imp gal; 1,300,000 US gal). English whisky was sold in 35 markets worldwide, with 40% of volume exported and 89% of exports going to EU countries. The report also noted a cumulative total of 337,747 distillery visitors over a 12-year period.

An October-2026 annual report by the English Whisky Guild estimated the value of maturing English whisky stock at £1.25 billion with 90% of producers making single malt. The English whisky category estimated to grow by 40% by 2030. English whisky was sold in over 30 markets across the world with 89% of exports going to Europe and 78% of exports going to the Asia-Pacific. The report also noted a cumulative total of 500,000 visitors over a 12 month period and an Increase in full time employment to 488 roles representing a 30% increase on the previous year.

=== International trade ===
As of 2024, English whisky distilleries supported 443 jobs in England. English whisky was exported to 32 countries, including Japan, France, Belgium, the Netherlands, Germany, Canada, Singapore, and the United States.

==== United States ====
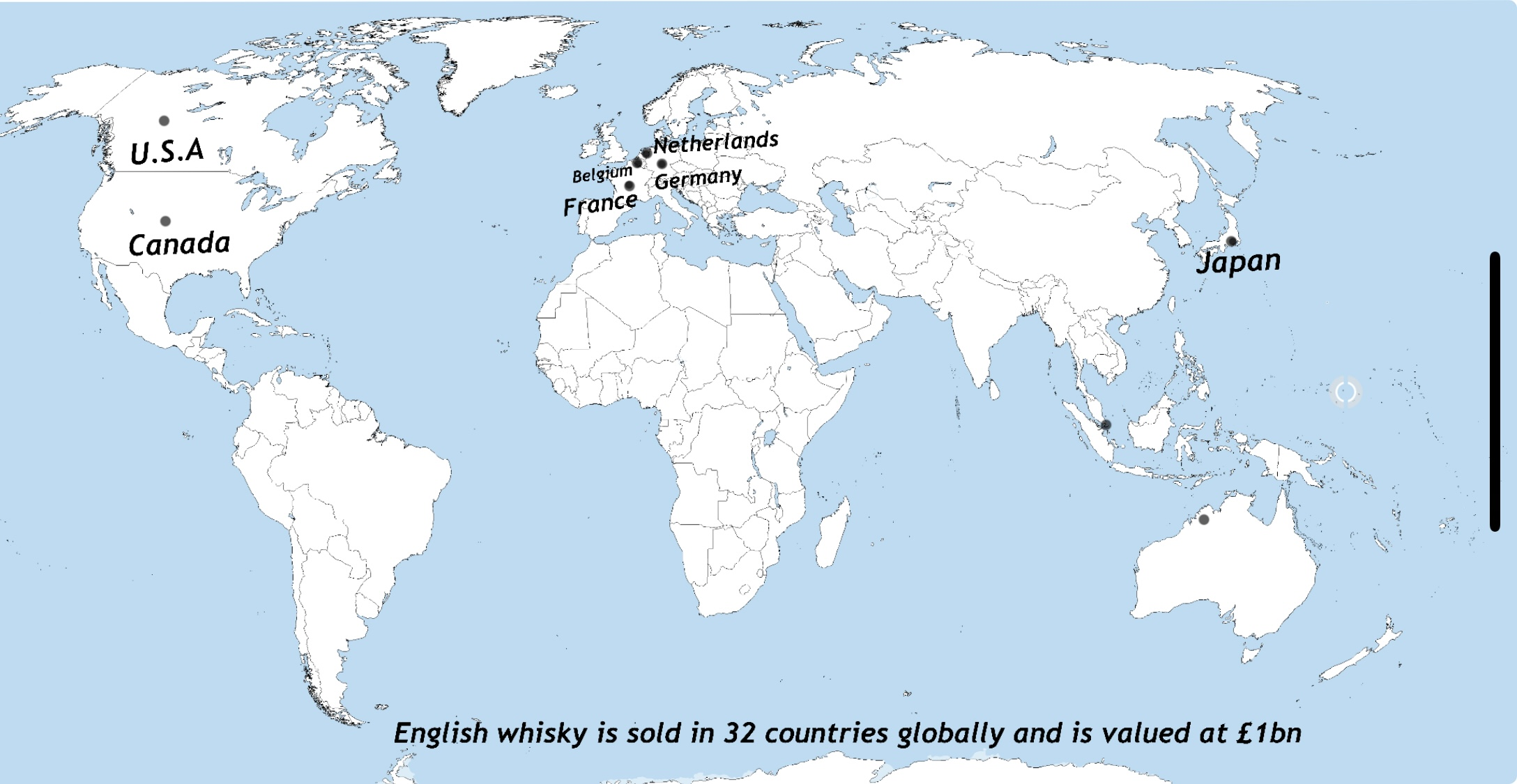

On 25 June 2011, US authorities informed The English Whisky Co. it would not be able to sell English single malt whisky in the US market because it is produced using recycled oak barrels and US law requires that new oak barrels be used. The company accused the US of double standards; whisky from other nations, including Scotland, Ireland, Wales and France, uses recycled barrels to produce whisky.

On 3 January 2013, after five years of lobbying the UK Foreign Office, UK trade bodies and the US embassy, The English Whisky Co. was granted permission to sell English whisky in the US market. On 2 April 2025, the United States placed tariffs of 10% on English whisky. On 4 April 2025, Morag Garden, CEO of the English Whisky Guild, made a statement noting the importance of the US market for English whisky sales, and confirming the EWG would work with the UK Government and members of the industry to ensure fair and open trade and support the growth for English whisky.

==== India ====
On 6 May 2025 India and the UK signed a trade agreement that reduced tariffs for English whisky from 150% to 75%, and was to drop to 40% by the tenth year of the agreement.

== Distilleries ==
=== Distilleries ===
There were 70 distilleries in England as of April 15, 2026, 27 of these were part of the English Whisky Guild. The oldest, The English Distillery, has brewed whisky for almost 20 years. The Cotswolds Distillery is the largest producer of whisky in England.

=== Regions ===
English whisky distilleries are divided into nine regions: the North East, Yorkshire and the Humber, East Midlands, the East of England, London, South East England, South West England, the West Midlands, and North West England. The English whisky geographic area contains the Isle of Wight and the Isles of Scilly.

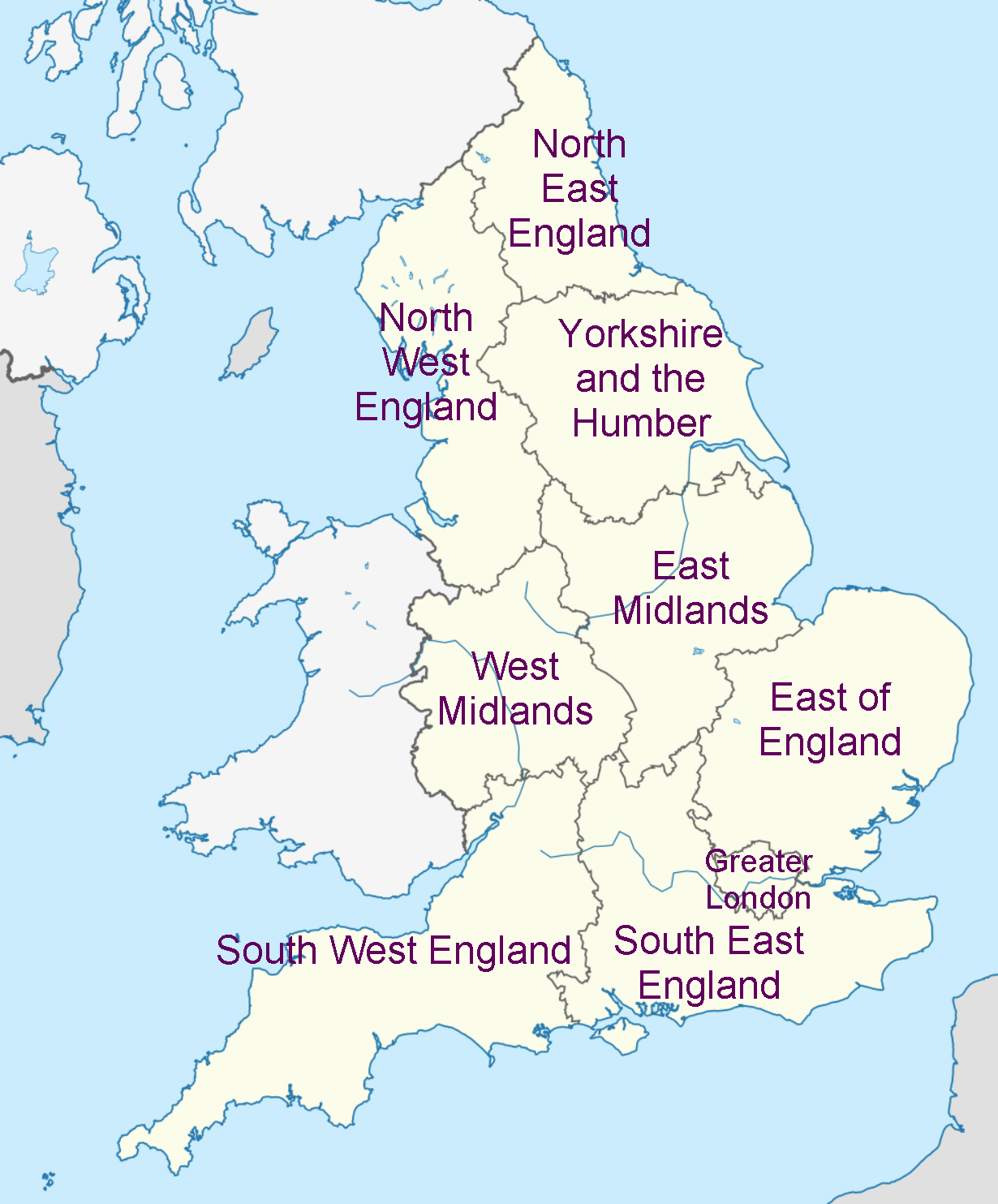

South East England has thirteen distilleries: Abingdon Distillery, Harley House Distillery, Wood Brothers Distillery, The Oxford Spirit Distillery (formerly The Oxford Artisan Distillery), Brightwell Bottle Distillery (formerly Black Bottle Distillery), Isle of Wight Distillery, Copper Rivet Distillers, Anno Distillers, Maidstone Distillery, Pleasant Land Distillery, Hawkridge Distillers, Aedda's Farm Distillery and Canterbury Brewers & Distillers.

South West England is the largest English whisky producing region with fifteen distilleries: Ten Hides Distillery, Wylye Distillery, Retribution Distilling Co., Witchmark Distillery, Dartmoor Whisky Distillery, Princetown Distillery, Trevethan Distillery, Penrock Distillery, Colwith Distillery, Rosemullion Distillery, Pocketful of Stones, Scilly Isles Distillery, Healeys Distillery, Wrecking Coast Distillery, Circumstance Distillery.

Greater London has six distilleries: Old Bakery Distillery, Maison Miles, East London Liquor Company, Bimber Distillery, Doghouse Distillery, The London Distilling Company.

The East of England has three distilleries: Fen Spirits, The English Distillery, Adnams Copper House Distillery.

The West Midlands has six distilleries: Cotswolds Distillery, Spirit of Birmingham Distillery, West Midlands Distillery, Ludlow Distillery, Henstone Distillery, Mercia Whisky.

The East Midlands has two distilleries: White Peak Distillery, Wharf Distillery.

North West England has eight distilleries: Weetwood Distillery, Forest Distillery, Spirit of Manchester Distillery, Forgan Distillery, Pendle Witch Distillery, Lancaster Spirits Company, Grasmere Distillery, The Lakes Distillery.

Yorkshire and Humber has a total of seven distilleries: Yorkshire Dales Distillery, Whittaker's Distillery, Cooper King Distillery, Ellers Farm Distillery, Spirit of Yorkshire Distillery, Yorkshire Distilling Co., Elsham Wold Distillery.

North East England has two distilleries: Ad Gefrin Distillery, Yarm Distillery.

== Types and styles ==
=== Types ===
Different types and styles of English whisky

The two main types of whisky produced in England are malt and grain whisky. Malt whisky is made from malted barley, distilled twice in copper pot stills, and matured in wooden casks of at least 700 litres (150 imperial gallons; 180 US gallons) for a minimum of three years. Grain whisky is produced at least partly from grains other than barley, such as maize, wheat, or rye.

England also produces rye whisky and bourbon-style whiskies. Rye whisky is made primarily from rye grain, and is characterised by peppery and spicy flavours. Bourbon-style whisky follows the same production specifications as American bourbon but uses UK-sourced ingredients. As of 2024, three distilleries produce this style: White Peak Distillery, Penrock Distillery and Doghouse Distillery. The product is marketed as "bourbon-style" in the United States because of labelling regulations.

Several regionally designated types also exist. Cornish whisky is made from local ingredients and is distilled, matured and bottled entirely within Cornwall; it is currently produced by Pocketful of Stones Distillery and Hicks & Healeys. Cumbrian whisky is produced entirely within Cumbria using local ingredients; the style is produced by Grasmere Distillery. Northumberland whisky is produced entirely within Northumberland using local ingredients and is made by Ad Gefrin Distillery. Yorkshire whisky is produced entirely within Yorkshire using local ingredients; it is currently produced by Spirit of Yorkshire Distillery and Cooper King Distillery, with the former also releasing blended expressions.

=== Styles ===
The two primary styles of whisky produced in England are single malt and blended whiskies. English single malt is produced using malt barley and distilled in pot still with sufficient copper contact at a single distillery, although fermentation and mashing are permitted to take place off site. Blended English whisky can be produced using a combination of malt and grain whisky within a single distillery; these are often smoother and cheaper than single malt whisky.

Five additional styles are also produced. Single cask is bottled from a single cask or barrel without blending. Small batch is produced by mixing the contents of a relatively small number of premium selected barrels. Triple malt is aged in three types of casks but not blended. Peated is produced using malt barley that has been dried over a fire, giving the whisky a smoky flavour. Cask strength is bottled from the barrel without any additional water.

== Bottling and distribution ==
English whisky is bottled by 18 independent whisky bottlers in England, including Cadenhead, That Boutique-y, North Star, Watt Whisky, Berry Bros & Rudd, The Heart Cut, The Whisky Show and Thompson Bros.

Several distribution partnerships have been established for English whisky distilleries. On 20 October 2020, Sip and Savour was appointed as UK distributor for the Oxford Artisan Distillery. BBC Spirits signed an agreement on 1 March 2021 to distribute Gullivers across Europe, while Mangrove took on distribution for the English Whisky Co. on 18 March 2021, and for the East London Liquor Company on 1 November 2022. It was announced around April 2022 that ImpEx Beverages would serve as the exclusive US importer for Spirit of Yorkshire Distillery. On 15 May 2023, Monarq Group entered into a partnership with the Lakes Distillery to introduce English whisky and other liquors to the Caribbean, Latin America, and the United States. On 11 December 2023, llva Saronno agreed to distribute Cotswolds Distillery products in the United Kingdom and the Benelux countries. (Note: Benelux is an economic union consisting of Belgium, the Netherlands, and Luxembourg) In March 2026, Sipwell was appointed for global distribution.

== Tourism and events ==
On 8 September 2022, the White Peaks Distillery auctioned its Wire Works Single Malt Whisky, which sold for £9,900 ($11,337). On 6 November 2023, the Cooper King Distillery released a whisky distilled using only net-zero-emissions energy. On 28 March 2025, Woven Whisky released the first fully English blended whisky, Experience No 22 Pastures New. It consists of whiskies from six distilleries, including Cotswolds, White Peak, Cooper King, Copper Rivet, Fielden, and Adnams, and is valued at £55 or US$71.

=== Partnership agreements ===
On 1 December 2021, Gullivers & Co signed a partnership agreements with England Rugby to produce rugby-themed whisky that would become the official whisky of the English Rugby Union. As of 2023, the partnership agreement between Gullivers and England Ruby remained active, with England's No. 6 Single Malt Whisky becoming the latest English rugby-themed whisky to be produced

=== International awards ===
On 30 April 2024, the Circumstance Distillery Single Grain Estate Whisky was awarded a gold medal at the San Francisco World Spirits Competition.

=== English Whisky Festival ===
On 19 March 2025, an annual English Whisky Festival was established and hosted by the English Whisky Society / Explore English Whisky in Birmingham. This event takes place in November each year, with three events taking place so far, which have included master classes and whisky tasting.

The first event took place on 18 November 2023; it was hosted online due to COVID-19, and included 30 whiskies from 14 distilleries. The second event took place on 18 November 2023, it included 32 distilleries and two whisky master classes, one by the Cooper King Distillery and one by The English Whisky Co. The third event took place on 23 November 2024, it included 30 whisky distilleries and a selection of festival-exclusive whiskies, some of the oldest English whiskies available, and a free whisky tasting glass.

=== English Whisky Day ===
On 28 November 2023, the first annual English Whisky Day took place at Westminster Hall in London to promote the sector; the event included 16 whisky producers. On March 14, 2025, a second English Whisky Day event took place; it was hosted by the MP for Thirsk and Malton Kevin Hollinrake, and was attended by 50 MPs and Lords, and over 200 guests.

=== Whisky Trail ===
On 28 August 2018, the Wine and Spirit Trade Association launched an English-Welsh Whisky Trail. English distilleries on the trail include Adnams Cooper House Distillery, Chase Distillery, Cotswolds Distillery, The English Whisky Co., and The Lakes Distillery.

== See also ==
- Food and drink industry in England
- New world whisky
- English Whisky Week
- Food and drink with protected status in the United Kingdom
