= Food and drink industry in England =

The food and drink industry is an important sector in the English economy consisting of hot and alcoholic beverages, (Note: This includes raw products such as coffee, tea and cocoa) spices, cereals, livestock, fisheries, sugar and honey.

Examples of food

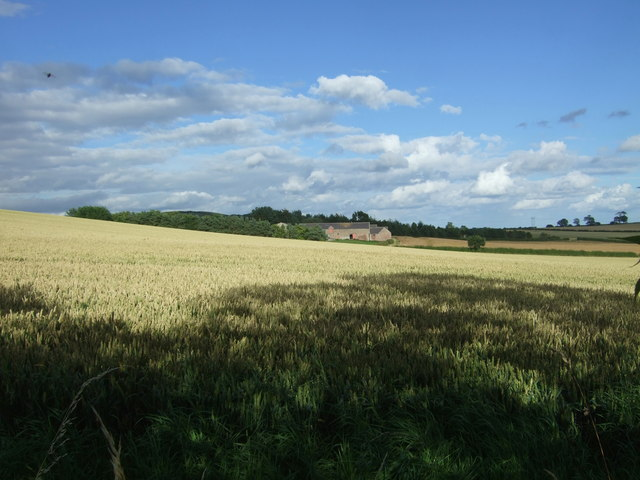
and drink in England

== Overview ==
The top food and drinks export categories are:

- Beverages and spices (such as English sparkling wine, and English whisky) (£2.3bn) and coffee, tea and spices (Note: information about this is in the hot beverages and spices section) (£1.2bn)
- Miscellaneous worth (£1.7bn)
- Agriculture (Note: Agriculture covers multiple areas including: Animal and vegetables oils/fats (£412.1mn); Cereals and cereal prep worth (£1.4bn); Vegetables in and fruit (£632.9mn); Meat and meat prep (£1.1bn)) (Cereals, Vegetables, Livestock)
- Dairy products (£778.7mn)
- Fish and Seafood (£357.8mn)
- Sugar and Honey worth (£245.4mn)

== Beverages and Spices ==
=== Alcoholic beverages ===
==== English wine ====
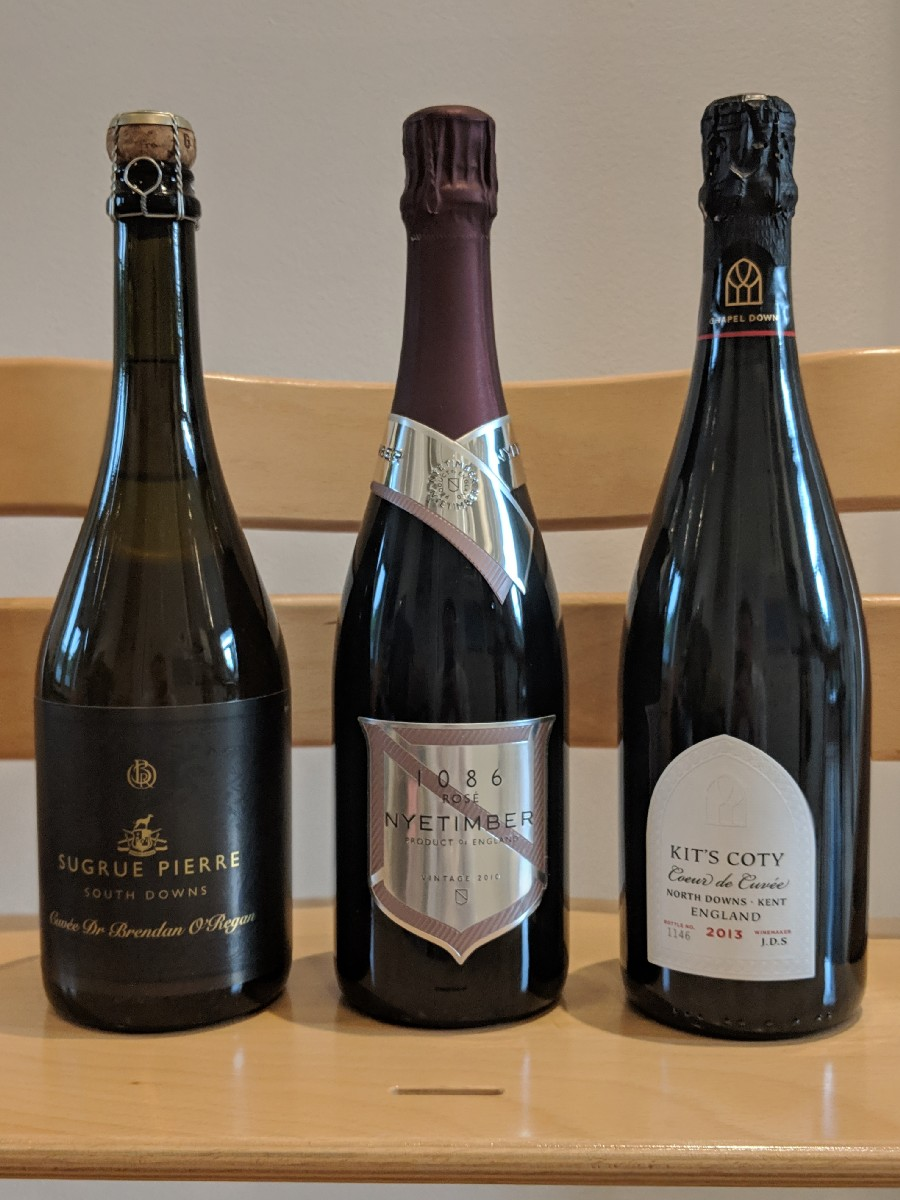
Bottles of prestige cuvees from English sparkling wine producers.

In 2018 England sold 550,000 bottles of English to 50 countries worldwide, this is up from 256,000 in 2018.

In 2022 the total value of English wine exports was £9.6 million ($11.8 million) with 800,000 bottles sold.

Some major English Wine brands include: Ridgeview Bloomsbury, Bolney Wine Estate, Lyme Bay, Aldwick Court Farm, Hattingley Valley, Lyme Block, Chapel Down, Brightwell Vineyard, and Stopham Estate.

==== English Whisky ====
As of 2023 there are currently 38,000 casks of English whisky maturing with an estimated 50,000 casks expected to be laid down by 2024, the estimated value of the maturing whisky stock is £1bn.

Some notable English Whisky brands include: English Whisky Co, Cotswolds, The Lakes, Bimber, The Oxford Artisan, and Dartmoor.

==== Hot beverages and spices ====
The total value of coffee, tea, cocoa and Yorkshire and spices in Yorkshire and the Humber as of 2019 is £1.2bn.

== Agriculture ==
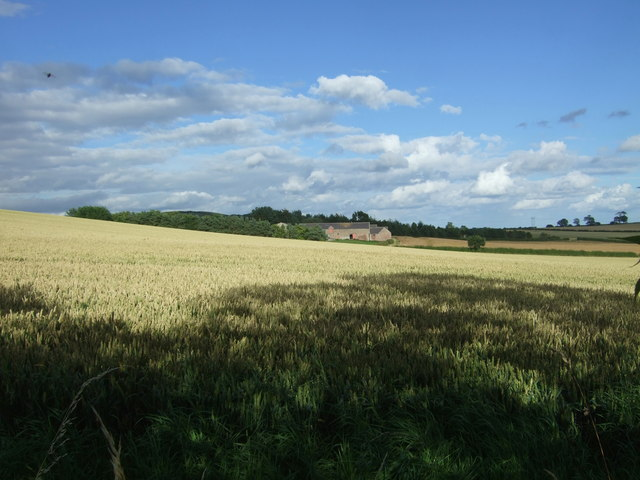
An example of English crops in Berwick upon Tweed

As of 2023 the total value of Agricultural in England is £1.8bn.

This covers a variety of Areas including:

- Cereals
- Vegetables
- Livestock (Note: Livestock includes: Dairy; Pork (pigs), beef (cows), poultry (chickens) and mutton (sheep); Eggs)

== Fisheries ==
A book about English fisheries in the Lake District

As of 2021 the total value of freshwater fisheries in England is £1.7bn.

In 2023 the most caught salt water fish and crustacean by English trawlers were: (Note: % represents the percentage of the national quota tns represents the tonnes of fish and crustacean caught.)

- North Sea Herring (11558)(15%)
- North Sea Cod (1627)(16%)
- North Sea Anglerfish (612)(7%)
- North Sea Haddock (3932)(14%)
- North Sea Whiting (1887)(17%)
- NE Atlantic Blue Whiting (2736)(7%)
- North Sea Nephrops (1612)(12%)
- West of Scotland Nephrops (13)(1%)
- NE Atlantic Mackrel (22220)(10%)
- Southern N.Sea Edible Crab (5985)(82%)

== Trade ==
The value of food and drink exports in England were down by 9% from 2020 and 15% from 2019.

England's best selling beverages were worth 2.3bn, up 8% in 2021, however England's fruit and vegetable exports were hit hard with sales down by 36%.

The top export destination for food and drinks exports from England is Ireland with 15% of all exports at a value of 1.5bn in 2021, this is down by 25% from 2020.

France and US with exports up 12% and 10% respectively along with Germany and the Netherlands are also among the top 5 markets for the English food and drink exports.

The total value of England's food and drinks exports is £10.2bn as of 2021.

== Geographical indications ==
=== Active geographic indicators ===
As of 2024 there are currently 36 active geographical indications for England: 14 cheese, 9 alcoholic drinks, 4 seafood, 6 meat, 1 dairy and 2 Fruit and vegetable products.

Among the cheeses are Beacon Fell traditional Lancashire cheese, Bonchester cheese, Buxton Blue, Dorset Blue Cheese, Dovedale cheese, Exmoor Blue Cheese, Staffordshire Cheese, Swaledale cheese, Swaledale ewes’ cheese, Teviotdale cheese, West Country farmhouse Cheddar Cheese, White Stilton cheese and Blue Stilton cheese, Yorkshire Wensleydale, and Single Gloucester.

In the alcohol category sit English Wine, English Regional Wine, English whisky, Gloucestershire cider and perry, Herefordshire cider and perry, Kentish ale and Kentish strong ale, Rutland Bitter, Somerset Cider Brandy, Sussex Wine, and Worcestershire cider and perry.

Seafood specialties include Cornish Sardines, London Cure Smoked Salmon, Traditional Grimsby Smoked Fish, and Whitstable oysters.

Meat products encompass the Cornish Pasty, Melton Mowbray Pork Pie, Newmarket sausage, Traditional Cumberland Sausage, West Country Beef, and West Country Lamb.

Dairy is represented by Cornish Clotted Cream, while the fruit-and-vegetable group features Vale of Evesham Asparagus and Yorkshire Forced Rhubarb.

== See also ==
- Economy of the United Kingdom
- Economy of England
