= Adnams =

Brewery in Suffolk, England

- Interactive map of Adnams
- Type: Publicly-traded
- Location: Southwold, Suffolk, England
- Coordinates: 52°19′38″N 1°40′47″E
- Opened: 1872
- Key people: George and Ernest Adnams, Jonathan Adnams, Jenny Hanlon
- Annual production volume: 85,000 imperial barrels (139,000 hL)
- Website: adnams.co.uk

Adnams is a regional brewery founded in 1872 in Southwold, Suffolk, England, by George and Ernest Adnams. It produces cask ale and bottled beers. Annual production is around 85,000 barrels.

In 2010, the company established the Copper House distillery for the production of gin, vodka and English whisky.

== History ==
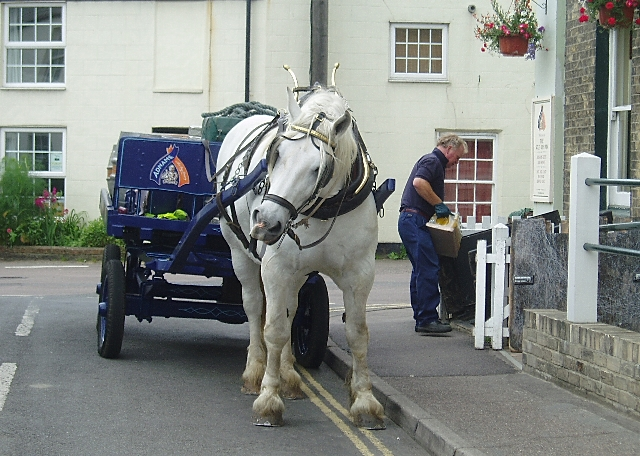
A dray horse making beer deliveries in June 2006

The earliest recorded brewing on the Adnams site was in 1396 by Johanna de Corby.

The Sole Bay Brewery in Southwold was purchased in 1872 by George and Ernest Adnams. The company was incorporated in 1890, and has remained independent since then, producing a range of beers for distribution mainly in East Anglia.

The mixed-culture yeast used by Adnams was sourced from Morgans brewery of Norwich in 1942.

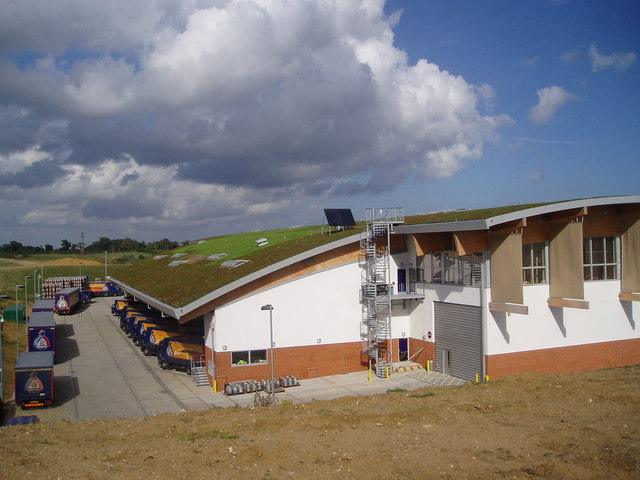
Adnams' distribution centre opened in 2006.

Until 1953 and from 1970 to 2006, casks of Adnams ale were delivered to the six pubs of Southwold by horse and dray; the tradition ended when a new distribution depot was built three miles from the brewery.

The company founded a charity, The Adnams Charity, in 1990 to celebrate its centenary as a public company. A percentage of the company's annual profits is used to support worthwhile causes within a 25-mile radius of Southwold.

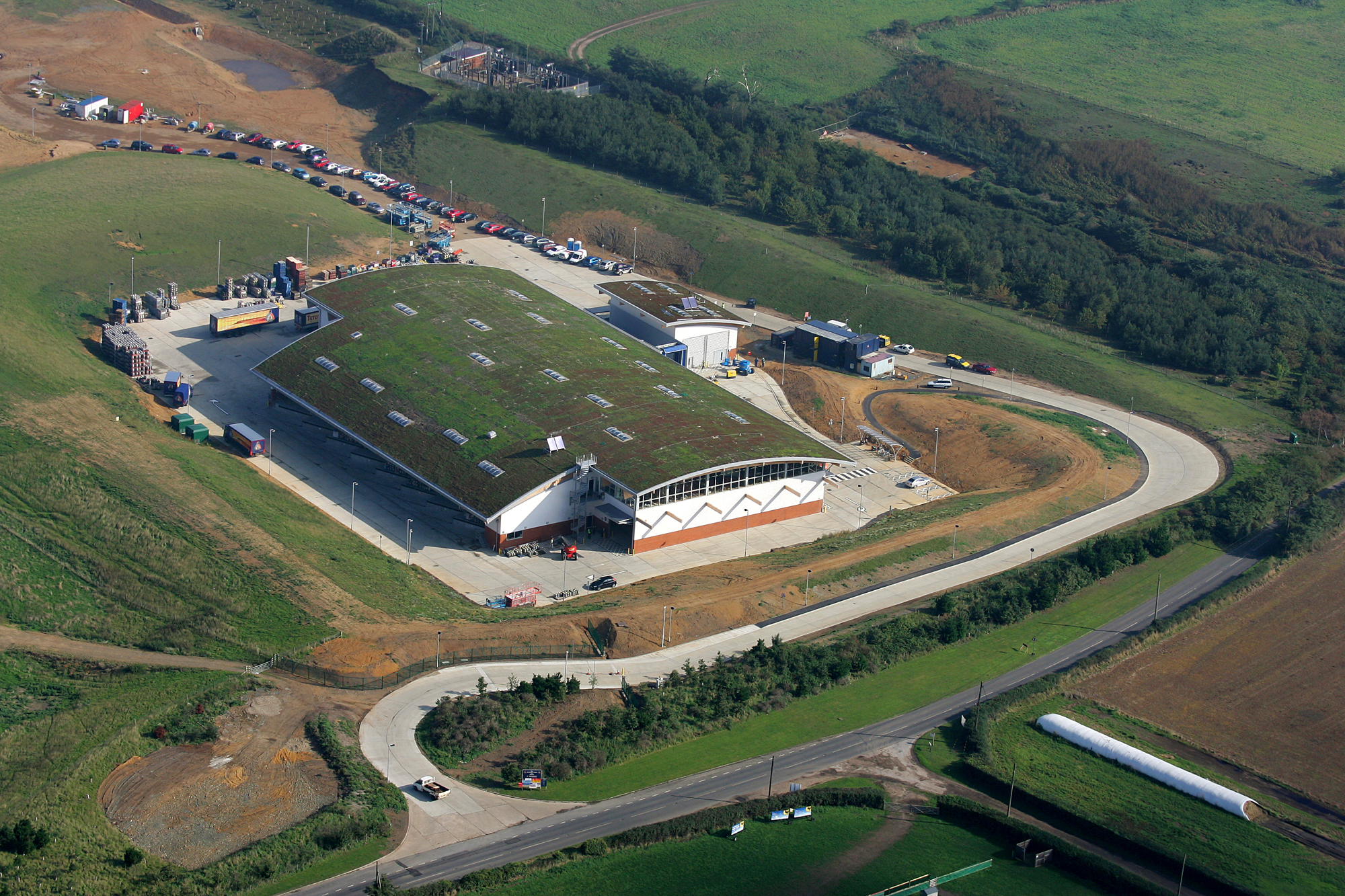
The Sky Garden Green Roof that tops this state of the art distribution centre was designed with insulation and rainwater absorption in mind. The sedum plants that make up the vegetation blanket store a lot of water and slow the run off from the roof to the drains.

In 1993, Adnams Extra won the Champion Beer of Britain, an award presented by the Campaign for Real Ale at the annual Great British Beer Festival. New fermenting vessels were installed in March 2001, and the brewhouse was completely re-equipped in July 2006, making it one of the most energy efficient in Europe.

At the beginning of 2004, Adnams purchased land in neighbouring village of Reydon to expand its business with a new distribution centre, designed by architect Jeremy Blake, which was nominated for the 2007 RICS East of England Award for Sustainability. Adnams was awarded a Queen's Award for Enterprise in the sustainable development category in 2005.

The distribution centre features the UK's largest living roof known as the Sky Garden which is made up of a variety of sedum species. Not only does this help to insulate the building, but the water stored in the sedum plants is also harvested and used to flush the staff toilets and clean company vehicles. This, combined with the solar panels and the environmental construction have meant the energy bills have been cut by half.

In June 2009, Adnams signed a five-year agreement to supply Ipswich Town FC with beers at their Portman Road stadium, replacing the 14-year-old association with Greene King. The rights went back to Greene King in July 2014.

In 2010 Carl's Copper Pot still and Rectifying columns were installed and put in operation in November of that same year for the production of Gin, Vodka & Whisky.

In March 2019, Adnams launched a new English cider called Wild Wave - marking the company's first foray into cider production.

== Beers ==
Adnams produce regular cask ale, seasonal beer, bottled beer, "international" beer and "commemorative" beers and cider :

=== Regular beers ===
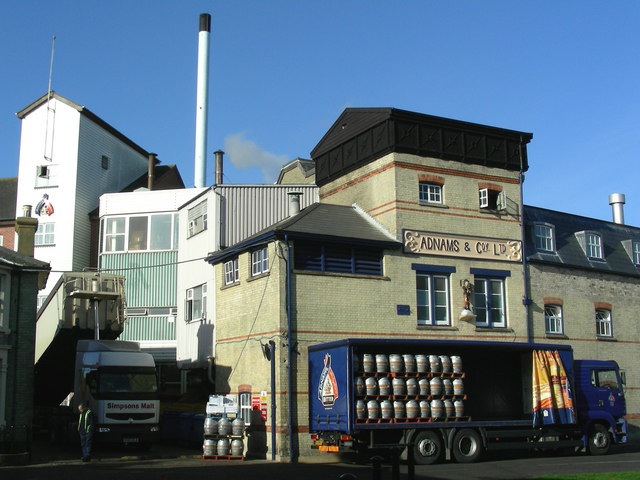
Sole Bay Brewery

- Broadside, a 4.7% abv premium bitter
- Explorer, a 4.3% golden bitter that was introduced in 2004 as a summer seasonal; it became a regular beer in February 2006
- Ghost Ship Pale Ale, a 4.1% abv pale ale, previously available May through to October but available year-round from March 2012.
- Ghost Ship Alcohol Free, a 0.5% version of their Ghost Ship Pale Ale. Produced through reverse osmosis.
- Sole Star, a low alcohol (2.7% abv) amber ale, introduced December 2011 and delisted shortly afterwards, it remains available in bottles. Reintroduced in 2017 at 0.9% abv and claimed to have the same taste as the original.
- Southwold Bitter, a 3.4% abv session bitter. This was renamed from plain "Bitter" and the packaging redesigned in May 2011.
- Topaz Gold, a 4.0% abv pale golden ale, brewed with Australian hop varieties, introduced August 2012

=== Keg beers ===
- Spindrift, a 5.0% abv golden bitter introduced in 2006

=== Seasonal ===
- English Red Ale, a 4.5% abv ale, available November to December, brewed with English Admiral hops.
- Extra, 4.3% abv. Available in April. Winner of the Champion Beer of Britain award in 1993.
- Fat Sprat, a 3.8% abv Amber summer beer, brewed with Pale Ale malted barley, Munich, Cara and Black malt, with Columbus, English Goldings, Cascade and Chinook hops; introduced in May 2013.
- Kristal White Ale, a 4.2% abv golden wheat beer, available February to Easter, brewed with malted wheat, barley and German Noble Hops.
- May Day, a 5.0% abv golden ale, available April and May, is made with East Anglian Pale Ale malt, and hopped with First Gold
- Mild, 3.2% abv. Available in March and May.
- Old Ale, a 4.1% "cold weather beer", introduced October 2006, and available October to January
- Oyster Stout, a 4.3% abv winter stout, available February and March, is made from East Anglian Pale Ale Malt, Crystal Malt, Chocolate Malt, roasted Barley and English Golding hops
- Regatta, a 4.3% abv golden ale for summer, is available May through to August
- Tally Ho, a 7.0% barley wine, limited availability in December
- Yuletide, a 4.5% abv Christmas beer, available from November to December, is brewed with Maris Otter, Chocolate and Amber Malts and Boadicea & Chinook Hops
- Jester, a 4.8% abv single hop golden beer brewed with Pale Ale Malt and hopped with a new British hop called Jester.

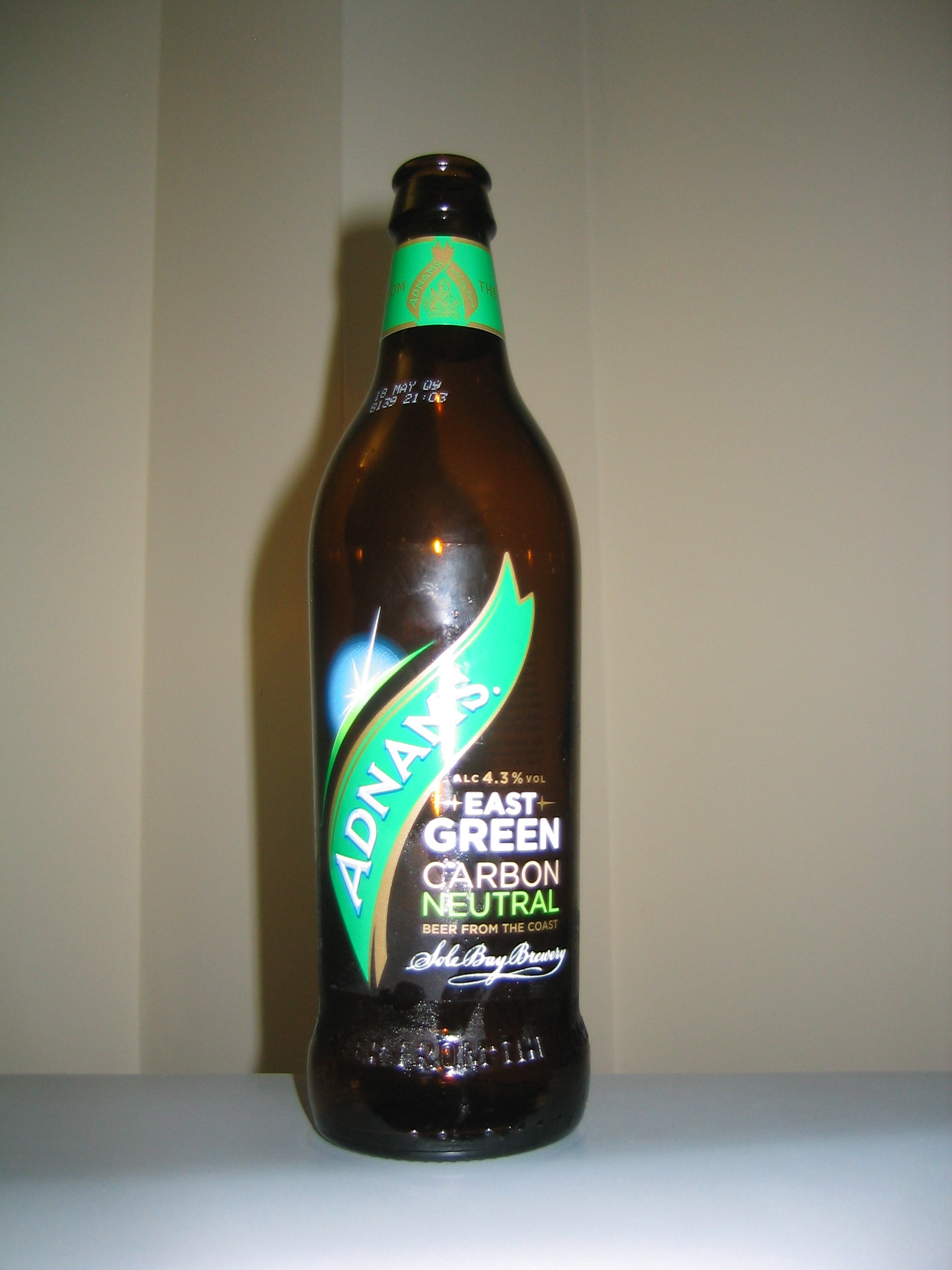
Bottle of East Green beer.

=== Bottles ===
- Broadside, a 6% bottled strong ale
- Ease Up I.P.A, a 4.6% session beer
- East Green, a 4.3%, a carbon neutral beer with a lighter bottle made with 15% recycled glass
- Explorer, a 5.5% bottled ale which, like the cask Explorer, is a blend of English and American styles
- Gun Hill, a 4.0% bottled dark mild
- Lighthouse, a 3.4% bottled traditional pale ale named after Southwold lighthouse; recipe based on an award-winning beer that used to be brewed called 'Champion Pale Ale'
- Spindrift, a 5.0% abv golden bitter, in bottles from 2010.
- Tally Ho, a bottled version of the barley wine which, at 7.2%, is slightly stronger than its cask equivalent
- Southwold Bitter a 3.4% bottled version of the cask beer

=== International beers ===
From time to time, Adnams produce limited brews of specialty beers, either in the styles of non-UK beers, or using special international ingredients. Past and current international beers have included:

- American Style IPA, a 4.8% abv cask beer using Californian yeast and American hop varieties
- Belgian Style Abbey Ale, a 5.0% abv cask beer
- Dutch Style Bokbier, a 5.3% abv cask beer
- New Zealand Pale Ale, a 4.0% abv cask beer brewed using Nelson Sauvin hops from New Zealand
- Spiced Winter Beer, a 4.0% abv cask beer incorporating cinnamon, juniper and other spices

=== Commemorative beers ===
Adnams have a long history of producing limited and one-off special beers to commemorate events of local or national importance. These are generally available for a limited period in bottles, and in cask at a few selected outlets. Recent beers include:-

- Diamond Ale, a 4.1% abv beer, brewed with Pale Ale and Premium Cara malts, with Sovereign hops and locally sourced honey, produced to celebrate the 2012 Diamond Jubilee of HM Queen Elizabeth II
- Flame Runner, a 3.9% abv beer with spices and citrus, to celebrate the 2012 London Olympics and the Olympic Torch Relay through Southwold
- Royal Wedding Ale, a 4.1% abv ale with Heather Honey, brewed for the wedding in 2011 of HRH Prince William and Catherine Middleton

== Distillery ==
The company branched out to distilling when they installed an 800-litre copper pot still with 42 plated rectifying columns, they acquired from Carl in 2010. The capacity was expanded in 2015 with two extra pot stills.

The product line holds a wide variety of gin, vodka and whisky.

The whisky range consists of three whiskies each with different mash-bills: a single malt of 100% malted barley: a rye whisky of 75% rye and 25% malted barley; and a "triple malt" of 60% malted barley, 35% wheat, and 5% oats.

Some less common products of the distiller are a Bierbrand Spirit of Broadside, two absinthe expressions: Verte & Rouge, and non-grain products like brandy made from locally grown grapes.
