= The Oxford Artisan Distillery =

English craft distillery

Coordinates: 51°45′8.3″N 1°13′25.7″W

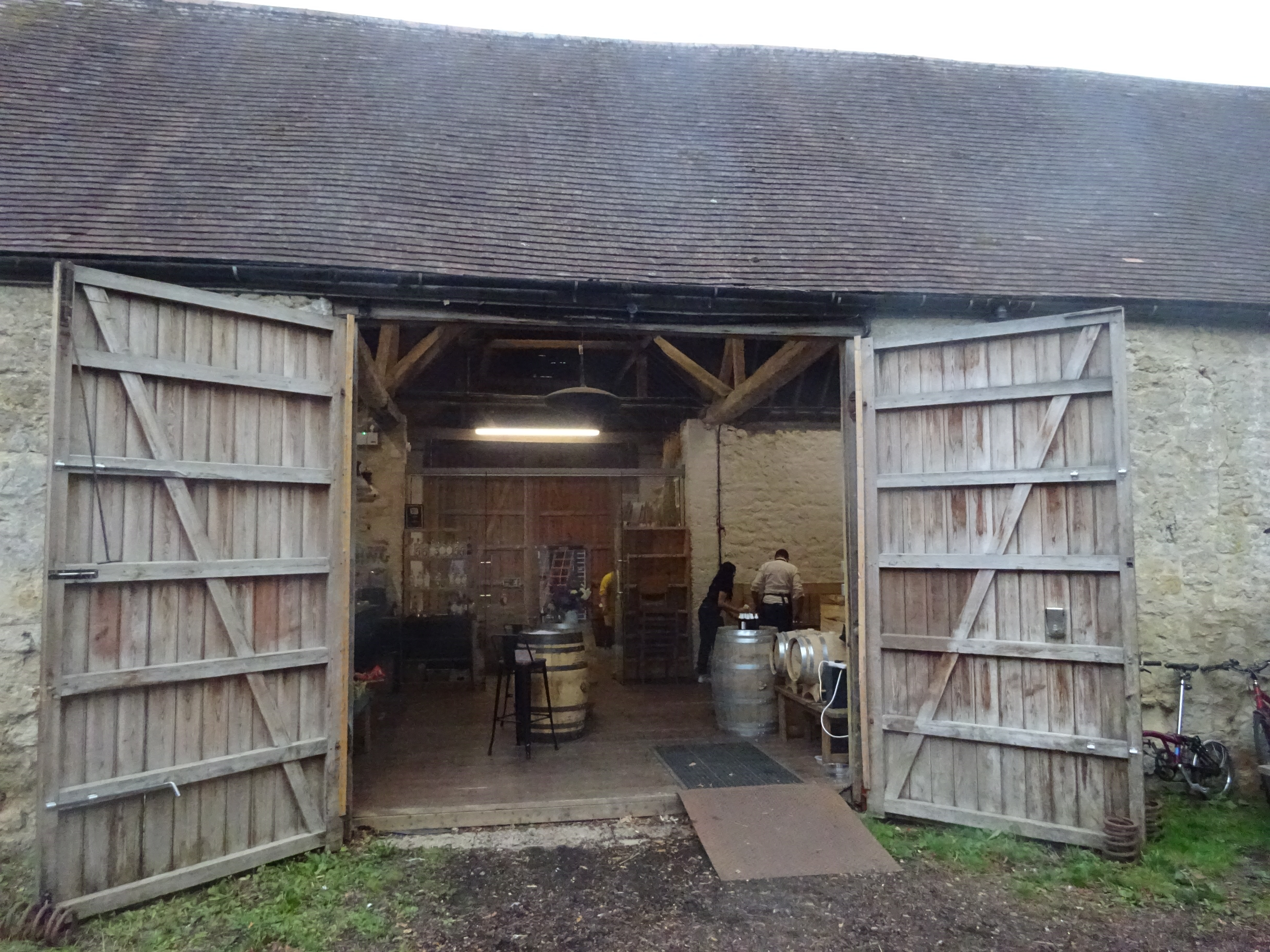
- Entrance to the distillery
- Type: Distillery
- Industry: Beverages
- Founded: 2017; 9 years ago
- Headquarters: Oxford, England
- Key people: Tom Nicolson(founder); Dave Smith (chairman) & Chico Rosa (master distiller)
- Products: Alcoholic beverages: spirits, including gin, vodka, whisky, and liqueurs
- Website: www.theoxfordartisandistillery.com

The Oxford Artisan Distillery (TOAD, previously known as The Spirit of TOAD) was the first ever legal distillery in Oxford, England. It is the first certified organic "grain-to-glass" distillery in the United Kingdom, covering all parts of the distillery process.

The distillery is located at the top end of South Park, Headington, in the Old Depot of Oxford City Council at the former Cheney Farm.

== History ==
The Oxford Artisan Distillery was founded in 2017 by Tom Nicolson, Cory Mason, and Tagore Ramoutar, distilling rye whisky, gin, and vodka. Shares were offered to the public in 2017.

Four organic farms close to Oxford supply the distillery with rye, wheat, and barley. The distillery uses ancient species of grains.

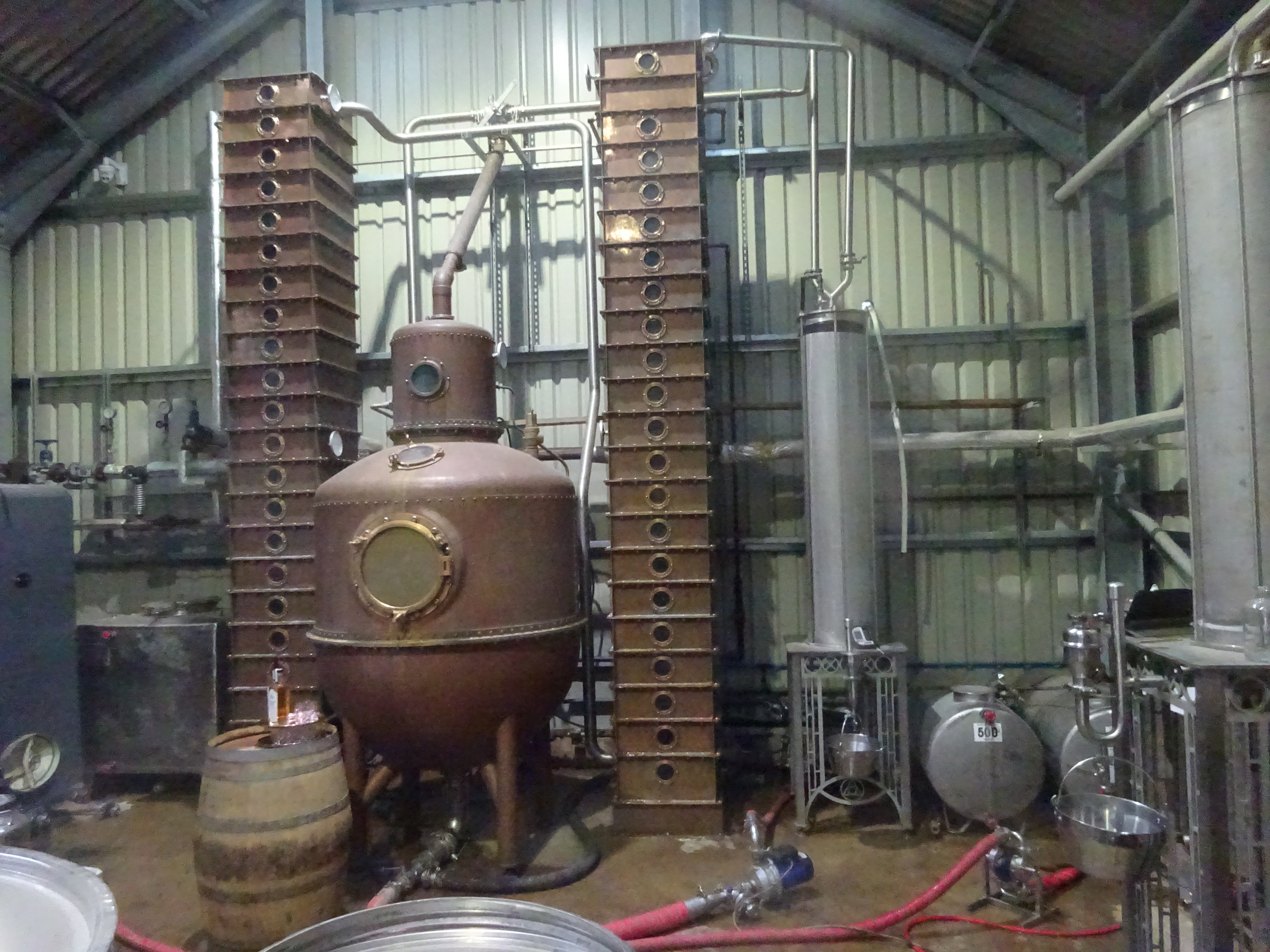
The Nautilus still

The largest still at the distillery is nicknamed "Nautilus" and has a capacity of 2,400 litres, with a column of 42 plates in two parts. A smaller still with a 500-litre capacity is known as "Nemo". The stills are named after the submarine and its captain in the Jules Verne 1870 science fiction novel Twenty Thousand Leagues Under the Seas. Both were built by South Devon Railway Engineering and are in a steampunk style, made of copper.

TOAD's gin has been judged among the top hundred available. The distillery is a craft gin maker. Early in 2020, Dave Smith took over as chairman from Neil Brown. Later in 2020, the distillery attained organic certification. The distillery was shortlisted for the Sustainable Use of Raw Materials Award in the 2019 Footprint Drinks Sustainability Awards. The distillery's products were judged as among the best food and drink from Oxfordshire in 2020.

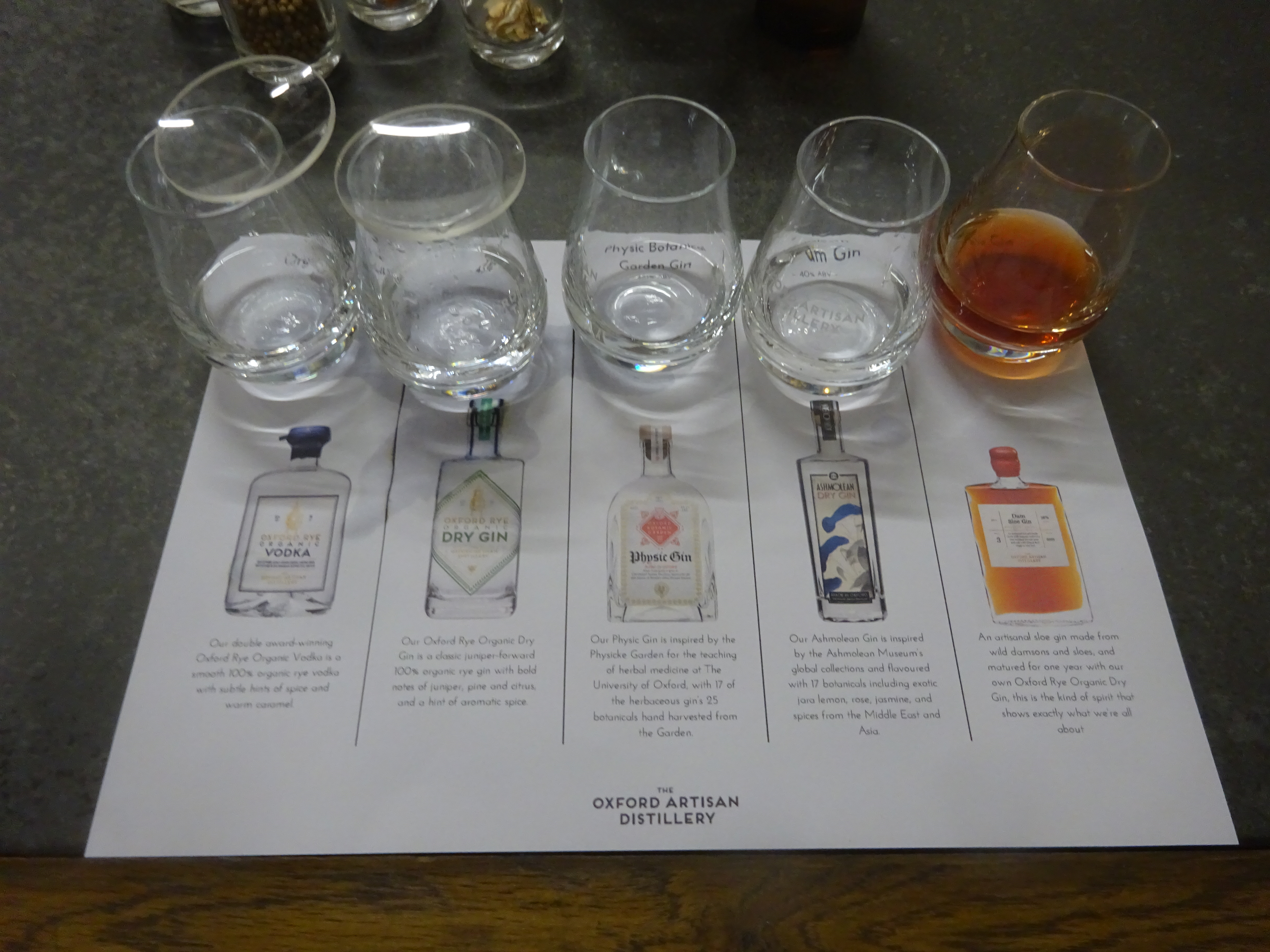
Tasting selection at the distillery

The distillery produces its own Oxford Rye Organic Dry Gin and Oxford Rye Organic Vodka. The distillery also uses its dry gin to produce a Dam Sloe Gin made from wild damsons and sloe. In 2018, the distillery launched its Oxford Physic Gin in collaboration with the University of Oxford Botanic Garden, using ingredients grown in the garden, and sold at the garden. Later in 2018, an Ashmolean Dry Gin was launed in collection with the Ashmolean Museum in Oxford, featuring spices from the Middle East and Asia to reflect the museums collections. Early in 2020, the distillery started to produce a pink gin liqueur. With the coming of the COVID-19 pandemic, the distillery also started to produce its own hand sanitiser in 2020. Also in 2020, the distillery started to produce an organic gin for Prince Charles, using herbs from his garden at Highgrove House, stocked at Fortnum & Mason in London. In Spring 2021, the distillery launched its rye whisky, produced by the Portuguese master distiller, Chico Rosa.

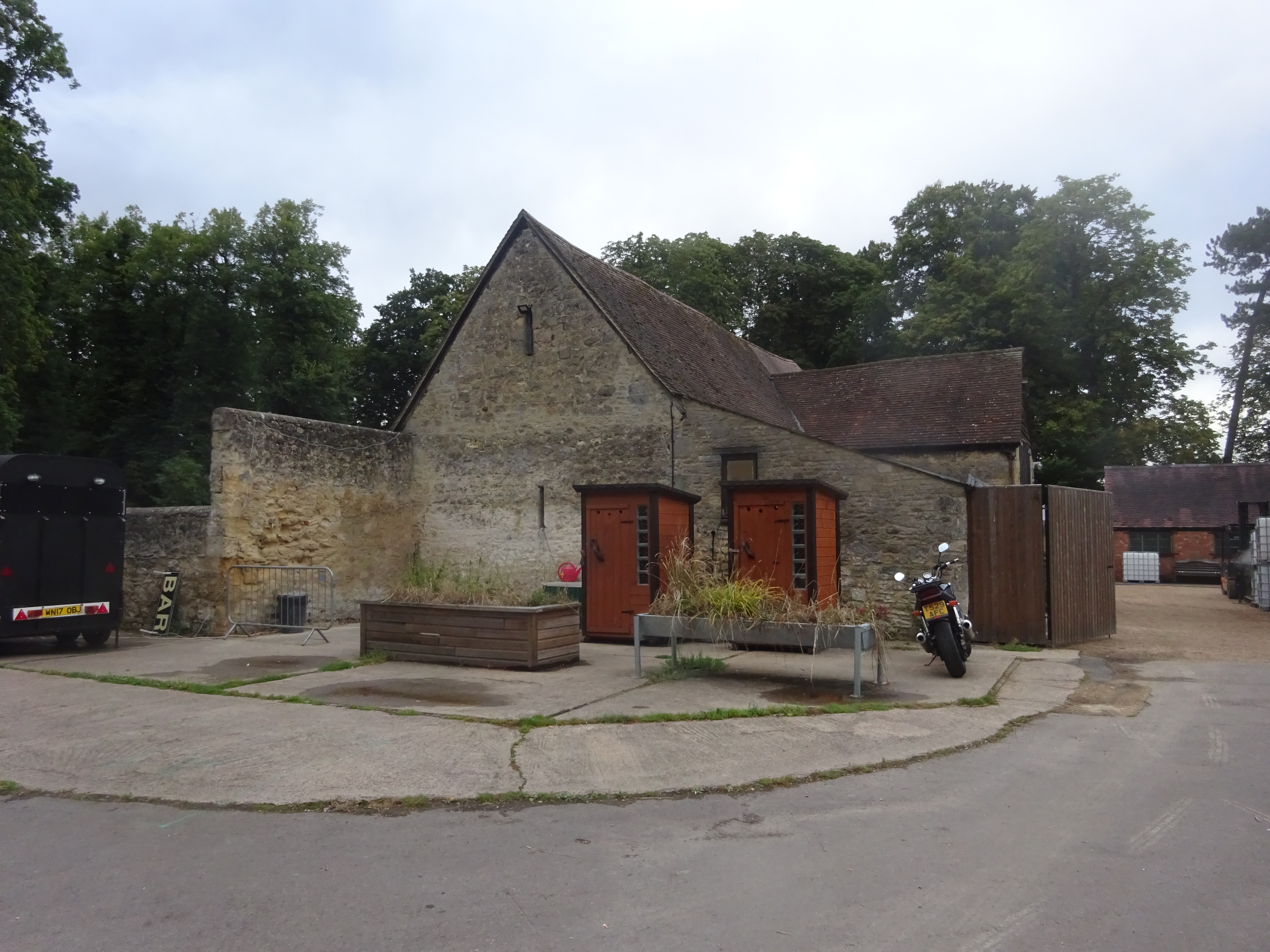
The barn building

The distillery includes a Grade II listed barn building, listed in 1972 and now used as a bar and tasting room serving the distillery's products.

In 2024 the company was re-named Fielden and announced it would relocate to a larger site in Yorkshire, ceasing production in Oxford. In 2025 Oxford City Council awarded the lease of the site to The Oxford Spirit Group, a new company founded by TOAD co-founder Tom Nicolson, with plans to bring the distillery back into use and open to visitors in the summer of 2026.

== External ==
- TOAD website
