= The English Distillery =

English distillery

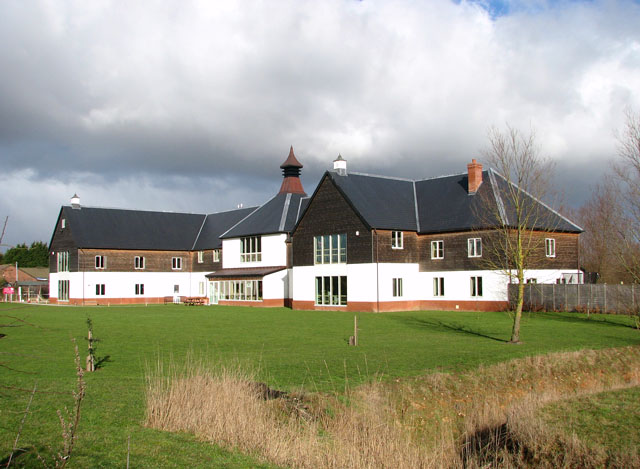
- Location: Harling Road, Roudham, Norfolk, United Kingdom
- Coordinates: 52°27′03″N 0°54′55″E
- Owner: The English Whisky Co.
- Founded: 2006
- Founder: James Nelstrop & Andrew Nelstrop
- Status: Operational
- No. of stills: 2
- Capacity: 1,800 litres
- Website: englishwhisky.co.uk

The English Distillery formerly St George's Distillery is a distillery based in Roudham, Norfolk. It is owned by the English Whisky Company who are a producer of single malt whisky and other malt-based alcoholic spirits. It is notable for being the first dedicated English distillery for single malt whisky in 100 years at the time of the building's completion in 2006. Their first mature batch went on sale in 2009.

== Founding and history ==
Initially the distillery was planned as a micro distillery, an experiment in turning excess barley into whisky. St. George's Distillery now produces in excess of 80,000 litres of alcohol a year. Marks and Spencer began selling own-label English whisky in October 2013 which is distilled at St George's.

The founder of the distillery, James Nelstrop, described manufacturing whisky in Norfolk as a dream forty-five years in culmination. His son, Andrew Nelstrop, was the main contractor in the building's construction. The barley now used by the distillery is sourced in Norfolk and historically would have been exported to Scotland's whisky makers.

The premises were officially opened by Prince Charles in March 2007. In 2010 there was a fire at the distillery, which reportedly was only minutes from burning down stock reserves. Nobody was injured and production returned to normal soon after.

As of 2024 the St George’s Distillery has been officially known as The English Distillery.

== Production ==
When The English Whisky Company first started distilling in 2006, the Nelstrops brought in Iain Henderson (formally of Laphroaig), and a year later they hired David Fitt who was the head distiller until 2022, Chris Waters is currently the senior distiller on site

The barley used in production is locally sourced and the water is supplied from an aquifer that runs directly beneath the distillery. The whisky is matured in casks, is natural coloured, non chill-filtered and bottled on site at 46% abv as standard.

=== Products ===
The distillery produces a range of whisky products, including beverages and whisky-based jams & conserves. Its single malt whisky series is noteworthy for being released in batches called 'Chapters' denoting the change in the spirit throughout the aging process.

In 2016 the company drop the Chapters format and rebranded the range to "The English" the first two new expressions were Original and Smokey. Followed a year later by the introduction of "The Norfolk" brand, a single grain range.

== Awards ==
=== World’s best single malt ===
On March 22, 2024 The English Whisky Co Sherry cask single malt whisky was named the world’s best single malt at the world whisky awards.

=== Oldest whisky in England ===
On 30 November 2023 the English Whisky Co released their 16 year old port cask whisky, the oldest whisky in England.

== See also ==
- English whisky
