= Canadian university scientific research organizations =

Expenditures by Canadian universities on scientific research and development accounted for about 40% of all spending on scientific research and development in Canada in 2006.

Research in the natural and social sciences in Canada, with a few important exceptions, is almost exclusively funded by the Canadian taxpayer and is distributed to universities by five important federal funding agencies, the Natural Sciences and Engineering Research Council (NSERC), the Canadian Institutes of Health Research (CIHR), and the Social Sciences and Humanities Research Council of Canada (SSHRC). Additional monies are also provided by the Canada Research Chairs organization, which provides financing for the staffing of research personnel at Canadian universities and the Canada Foundation for Innovation, which supports the acquisition of scientific research infrastructure by Canadian universities, colleges, research hospitals, and non-profit research institutions.

In 2006, total spending on scientific and industrial research in Canada amounted to C$28.067 billion or about 2 percent of GDP. In 2006, Canadian universities spent C$10.890 billion on research and development, representing about 40 percent of all R&D spending in Canada and about .66 percent of Canada's GDP.

Below are the names of those university institutions that carry out both natural and social science research, although the emphasis here is on the former. The largest part of funding from NSERC, is received by 15 universities, not surprisingly the largest in the country, which have formed an association named the U15. The list below ranks the members of this group in order of NSERC grant size. A number of thematically specialized virtual university research organizations, the Networks of Excellence, have been established and are listed here. Also included are the names of some particular research organizations and projects notable for their large size or for other characteristics. This is followed by a brief description of the expenditures on scientific research and development by sector. Finally the list includes those support organizations that fund scientific research at the university level or contribute to its success in other ways.

== U15 largest Canadian research universities ==
=== University of Toronto ===
Toronto, Ontario.

NSERC Funding 2003: C$M 54,264

Number of Canada Research Chairs – 245

==== Research institutes ====
Natural science research

- Institute for Aerospace Studies
- Canadian Institute for Theoretical Astrophysics
- Centre for the Analysis of Genome Evolution and Function (CAGEF)
- Terrence Donnelly Centre for Cellular and Biomolecular Research
- Canadian Drosophila Microarray Centre
- Centre for Environment
- The Fields Institute for Research in Mathematical Sciences
- Proteomics Research Centre
- Engineering Research
- Centre for Advanced Coating Technologies
- Centre for Applied Power Electronics
- Institute of Biomaterials and Biomedical Engineering
- Canadian Aeronautics and Space Institute
- Emerging Communications Technology Institute
- Energenius Centre for Advanced Nanotechnology
- Hitachi Survey Research Centre
- Intelligent Transportation Systems
- Institute for Knowledge Innovation and Technology
- Centre for Landscape Research InterNetwork
- Lassonde Institute (Engineering Geoscience)
- Centre for Microelectronics Assembly and Packaging
- Molecular Design and Information Technology Center (MDIT)
- Centre for Nuclear Engineering
- Positron Emission Tomography Centre
- Pulp and Paper Centre
- Vector Institute

Medical research

- Sunnybrook Research Institute
- Institute of Medical Science
- Sunnybrook Centre for studies in Aging
- Banting and Best Diabetes Centre
- Centre for Evidence-Based Medicine
- Centre for Health Promotion
- Heart & Stroke/Richard Lewar Centre for Cardiovascular Research
- Institute for Human Development, Life Course and Aging
- Centre for International Health, Faculty of Medicine
- R. Samuel McLaughlin Centre for Molecular Medicine
- Centre for the Neurobiology of Stress
- Centre for research in Neurodegenerative Diseases
- U of T Centre for the Study of Pain
- Sleep Medicine and Circadian Biology

Social science research

- Joint Centre for Bioethics
- Clarkson Centre for Business Effectiveness and Board Effectiveness
- Capital Markets Institute
- CERIS – The Ontario Metropolis Centre
- Institute for Competitiveness & Prosperity
- Centre of Criminology
- Centre for research in Education (Medical)
- International Centre for Educational Change
- G8 Information Centre
- Institute for the History and Philosophy of Science and Technology
- Centre for Industrial Relations
- Centre for research into Information Studies
- Centre for Innovation Law and Policy
- Centre for Integrative and Anti-Racism Studies
- Institute for International Business
- Knowledge Media and Design Institute
- Laidlaw Centre (Institute of Child Study)
- Centre for Management of Technology and Entrepreneurship
- Centre for Media and Culture in Education
- Centre for Modern Language
- Multimedia Centre for Learning in the Humanities
- Munk Centre for International Studies
- Institute for Policy Analysis
- Centre de Recherches en éducation Franco-ontarienne
- Centre for Applied Social Research
- Atkinson Centre for Society and Child Development
- Imperial Oil Centre for Studies in Science, Mathematics and Technology Education
- Centre for Study of Education and Work
- Centre for the Study of the United States
- Centre for Teacher Development
- Centre for Technology and Social Development
- Transformative Learning Centre
- Centre for Urban and Community Studies
- Centre for Research in Women's Health
- Institute for Women's Studies and Gender Studies
- Centre for Women's Studies in Education

=== University of British Columbia ===
Vancouver, British Columbia.

NSERC Funding 2003: C$M 43,004

Number of Canada Research Chairs – 148

==== Research institutes ====
Land & Food Systems

- Avian Research Centre
- UBC Dairy Education and Research Centre
- UBC Centre for Aquaculture and Environmental Research (CAER)
- Department of Fisheries and Oceans (DFO)
- Soil-Water Environmental Laboratory
- UBC Botanical Garden and Centre for Plant Research
- Wine Research Centre

Natural Science and Engineering

- Institute for Aboriginal Health
- Institute for Applied Mathematics (IAM)
- Canadian Institute for Advanced Research
- Institute of Health Promotion Research
- Institute of Mental Health
- Pacific Institute for the Mathematical Sciences (PIMS)
- Peter Wall Institute for Advanced Studies
- Rick Hansen Institute (RHI)
- Robotics & Intelligent Systems (IRIS)
- Sustainable Development Research Institute (SDRI)
- Institute for Systems Biology (ISB)

Social Science

- Institute of Asian Research
- BC Children's Hospital Research Institute
- English Language Institute (ELI)
- Institute for European Studies
- Human Early Learning Partnership
- Liu Institute for Global Issues
- Institute for Shastri Indo-Canadian Institute (SICI)

UBC also operates 65 research centres.

=== University of Alberta ===
Edmonton, Alberta.

NSERC Funding 2003 C$M 36,291

Number of Canada Research Chairs – 100

==== Centres and institutes ====
Agricultural, Life and Environmental Sciences

- Alberta Poultry Research Centre
- Alberta Veterinary Research Institute (AVRI)
- Canada Science & Research Institute Inc (CSRI/Non Gov/Tr Labs Partner)
- Centre for Enhanced Forest Management (EFM)
- Dairy Research and Technology Centre (DRTC)
- Environmental Research and Studies Centre
- Material Culture Institute (MCI)

Engineering

- Alberta Centre for Surface Engineering and Science
- Construction Research Institute for Canada (CIRC)
- Imperial Oil Centre for Oil Sands Innovation

Health Sciences Council

- Alberta Centre on Aging
- Alberta Institute for Human Nutrition
- Community-University Partnership (CUP)
- The John Dossetor Health Ethics Centre

Medicine and Dentistry

- Alberta Asthma Centre
- Alberta Centre for Prions and Protein Folding Diseases
- Alberta Diabetes Research Institute
- Alberta Institute for Viral Immunology (AIVI)
- Alberta Peptide Institute (API)
- Alberta Transplant Applied Genomics Centre (ATAGC)
- Canadian VIGOUR Centre
- Centre for Health Evidence
- Centre for Neuroscience
- Digestive Health Care Centre for Colon Cancer (DHCCC)
- Glaxo Wellcome Heritage Research Institute
- Magnetic Resonance Diagnostics Centre (MRDC)
- Muttart Diabetes Research & Training Centre
- Perinatal Research Group
- Women and Children's Health Research Institute (WCHRI)

Nursing

- Institute for Philosophical Nursing Research
- International Institute for Qualitative Methodology
- International Nursing Centre

Pharmacy and Pharmaceutical Sciences

- Centre for Community Pharmacy Research and Interdisciplinary Studies (c/COMPRIS)
- Noujaim Institute

School of Public Health

- Alberta Centre for Injury Control and Research
- Centre for Health Promotion Studies

Rehabilitation Medicine

- Centre for Studies in Clinical Education (CSCE)
- Institute for Stuttering Treatment and Research (ISTAR)
- Rehabilitation Research Centre

Science

- Alberta Centre for Earth Observation Sciences (CEOS)
- Alberta Cooperative Conservation Research Unit
- Alberta Ingenuity Centre for Carbohydrate Science
- Alberta Machine Intelligence Institute
- Applied Mathematics Institute
- Centre for Mathematical Biology
- Centre for Particle Physics
- Institute for Geophysical Research (IGR)
- Institute for Space Science, Exploration and Technology (ISSET)
- Statistics Centre
- Theoretical Physics Institute

=== McGill University ===
Montreal, Quebec.

Number of Canada Research Chairs – 133 Number of Canada Excellence Research Chairs – 2

NSERC Funding 2003: C$M 34,984

==== Research facilities ====
Downtown Campus – Faculty of Science and Faculty of Engineering

Mathematics, Natural Sciences and Engineering:

- Bone and Periodontal Research, Centre for
- Advanced Materials, McGill Institute for (MIAM)
- Biodiversity Science, Quebec Centre for
- Bioinformatics, McGill Centre for
- Brain, Language and Music, Centre for Research on (CRBLM)
- Cell Imaging and Analysis Network (CIAN)
- Comparative Medicine and Animal Resources Centre
- Developmental Biology Research Initiative (DBRI)
- Experimental Ecology and Evolution, Laboratory for (LE3)
- High Energy Physics, Centre for
- Institut des sciences mathématiques de Montréal (ISM)
- Intelligent Machines, Centre for (CIM)
- Music, Media and Technology, Centre for Interdisciplinary Research in (CIRMMT)
- Pain, Alan Edwards Centre for Research on
- Physics of Materials, Centre for the (CPM)
- Self-Assembled Chemical Structures, Centre for (CSACS)
- Sustainability in Engineering and Design, Trottier Institute for
- Aerospace Engineering, McGill Institute for
- High Field NMR Facility
- Nanotools Microfab Laboratory
- Phytotron
- Redpath Museum
- Sheldon Biotechnology Centre
- Advanced Systems & Technologies on Communications, Centre for (SYTAcom)
- Water Resources Management, Brace Centre for
- Intelligent Machines, Centre for (CIM)
- McGill Metals Processing Centre
- Trottier Institute for Sustainability in Engineering and Design (TISED)

Downtown Campus – Faculty of Medicine and Faculty of Dentistry

- Alan Edwards Centre for Research on Pain
- Anesthesia Research Unit
- Artificial Cells & Organs Research Centre
- Biomedical Ethics Unit
- Centre for Advanced Bone and Periodontal Research
- Centre for Applied Mathematics in Bioscience and Medicine (CAMBAM)
- Centre for Bone and Periodontal Research
- Centre for Bioinformatics
- Centre for Biorecognition and Biosensors
- Centre of Genomics and Policy
- Centre for Research in Neuroscience
- Centre for Nursing Research
- Centre for Research on Brain, Language and Music
- Centre for Research in Reproduction and Development
- Centre for Structural Biology (GRASP Research Group)
- Comparative Medicine and Animal Resources Centre
- Cystic Fibrosis Translational Research Centre (CFTRc)
- Douglas Mental Health University Institute
- Facility for Electron Microscopy Research (FEMR)
- Institute for Health and Social Policy
- J.D. MacLean Centre for Tropical Diseases
- Lady Davis Institute for Medical Research (McGill AIDS Centre)
- Ludmer Centre for Neuroinformatics & Mental Health
- McGill Centre for Studies in Aging
- McGill International TB Centre
- McGill Centre for Translational Research in Cancer
- McGill Centre for the Convergence of Health and Economics (MCCHE)
- McGill University and Genome Quebec Innovation Centre
- Microbiome and Disease Tolerance Centre
- Montreal Neurological Institute-Hospital
- Research Institute MUHC
- Rosalind and Morris Goodman Cancer Research Centre
- Steinberg Centre for Simulation and Interactive Learning
- The Network for Oral and Bone Health Research

Macdonald campus

- Bioresource Engineering Machine Shop
- CT Scanning Laboratory for Agricultural and Environmental Research
- Ecological Agriculture Projects
- Fermentation and Bioprocessing Laboratory
- Flow Cytometry Core Facility
- Lyman Entomological Museum and Research Laboratory
- Macdonald Campus Farm
- J.S. Marshall Radar Observatory
- Mary Emily Clinical Nutrition Unit
- McGill University Herbarium
- Morgan Arboretum
- Pilot Plant
- Plant Science Field Research Facilities
- Plant Science Research Greenhouses and Phytorium
- Soil and Plant Analysis Laboratory
- The Trace Metal Analysis Laboratory

Off campus

- Bellairs Research Institute (Barbados)
- Gault Nature Reserve (Mont-Saint-Hilaire)
- Mont-Saint-Hilaire Nature Conservation Centre
- McGill Arctic Research Station
- McGill Sub-Arctic Research Station
- Molson Nature Reserve (Ste-Anne de Bellevue)
- Wilder and Helen Penfield Nature Reserve (Lake Memphrémagog)
- Interuniversity/ Interinstitutional(based at McGill or elsewhere)
- CLUMEQ Supercomputer Centre
- Coriolis II (Rimouski)
- Huntsman Marine Science Centre
- McGill University and Genome Quebec Innovation Centre
- Pulp and Paper Research Institute – Canada (PAPRICAN)
- Quebec Interuniversity Centre for Social Statistics (QICSS)
- Centre for the Study of Learning and Performance (CSLP)

=== University of Waterloo ===
Waterloo, Ontario

NSERC Funding 2003: C$M 29,763

Number of Canada Research Chairs – 48

==== Research centres and institutes ====
- Canadian Centre of Arts & Technology (CCAT)
- Canadian Centre for Cultural Innovation (CCCI)
- Centre for Accounting Research & Education (CARE)
- Centre for Advanced Studies in Finance (CASF)
- Centre for Advancement of Trenchless Technologies at Waterloo (CATT)
- Centre for Applied Cryptographic Research (CACR)
- Centre for Business, Entrepreneurship & Technology (CBET)
- Centre for Computational Mathematics in Industry & Commerce (CCMIC)
- Centre for Contact Lens Research (CCLR)
- Centre for Cultural Management (CCM)
- Centre for Education in Mathematics & Computing (CEMC)
- Centre for Mental Health Research (CMHR)
- Centre for Molecular Beams & Laser Chemistry
- Centre for Theoretical Neuroscience
- Heritage Resource Centre
- Institute for Computer Research (ICR)
- Institute for Innovation Research (IIR)
- Institute for Polymer Research (IPR)
- Institute for Quantitative Finance & Insurance (IQFI)
- Institute for Quantum Computing (IQC)
- Institute for Risk Research (IRR)
- Institute for Vision Science & Technology (IVST)
- Institute of Biochemistry & Molecular Biology
- Institute of Insurance and Pension Research (IIPR)
- Integrated Centre for Visualization, Design & Manufacturing (ICVDM)
- Mid-Size City Research Centre (MCRC)
- Nortel Networks Institute for Advanced Information Technology (NNI)
- Schlegel – UW Research Institute for Aging (RIA)
- Survey Research Centre (SRC)
- Waterloo Centre for the Advancement of Co-operative Education (WatCACE)
- Waterloo Centre for Atmospheric Sciences
- Waterloo Centre for Automotive Research (WatCAR)
- Waterloo Centre for German Studies
- Waterloo Institute for Groundwater Research (WIGR)
- Waterloo Institute for Health Informatics Research (WIHIR)
- University of Waterloo Management of Integrated Manufacturing Systems Research Group (WATMIMS)

=== Université Laval ===
Québec, Québec

NSERC Funding 2003: C$M 28,128

Number of Canada Research Chairs – 80

==== Network of Centres of Excellence ====
- ArcticNet
- Geoide
- Canadian Institute for Photonic Innovations

==== Instituts de recherche ====
- Institut des nutraceutiques et des aliments fonctionnels (INAF)
- Institut d'éthique appliquée (IDÉA)
- Institut d'études anciennes (IEA)
- Institut Hydro-Québec en environnement, développement et société (IHQEDS)
- Institut québécois des hautes études internationales (IQHEI)
- Institut sur le patrimoine culturel (IPAC)
- Institut sur le vieillissement et la participation sociale des aînés (IVPSA)
- Institut Technologies de l'Information et Sociétés (ITIS)

==== Centres de recherche ====
- Centre d'analyse des politiques publiques (CAPP)
- Centre de recherche en aménagement et développement (CRAD)
- Centre de recherche en biologie de la reproduction (CRBR)
- Centre de recherche en cancérologie (CRC)
- Centre de recherche en économie agroalimentaire (CRÉA)
- Centre de recherche en endocrinologie moléculaire et oncologique (CREMO)
- Centre de recherche en géomatique (CRG)
- Centre de recherche en horticulture (CRH)
- Centre de recherche en infectiologie (CRI)
- Centre de recherche en modélisation, information et décision (CERMID)
- Centre de recherche en neurosciences (CRN)
- Centre de recherche en rhumatologie et immunologie (CRRI)
- Centre de recherche en sciences et ingénierie des macromolécules (CERSIM)
- Centre de recherche en sciences et technologie du lait (STELA)
- Centre de recherche et d'intervention sur la réussite scolaire (CRIRES)
- Centre de recherche et d'intervention sur l'éducation et la vie au travail (CRIEVAT)
- Centre de recherche Hôpital Laval
- Centre de recherche interdisciplinaire sur la violence familiale et la violence faite aux femmes (CRI-VIFF)
- Centre de recherche interuniversitaire sur la formation et la profession enseignante (CRIFPE)
- Centre de recherche interuniversitaire sur la littérature et la culture québécoises (CRILCQ)
- Centre de recherche interuniversitaire sur la mondialisation et le travail (CRIMT)
- Centre de recherche sur la fonction, la structure et l'ingénierie des protéines (CREFSIP)
- Centre de recherche sur l'adaptation des jeunes et des familles à risque (JEFAR)
- Centre de recherche sur l'aluminium (REGAL-LAVAL)
- Centre de recherche sur le bois (CRB)
- Centre de recherche sur le cerveau, le comportement et la neuropsychiatrie (CRCN)
- Centre de recherche sur le métabolisme énergétique (CREME)
- Centre de recherche sur les infrastructures en béton (CRIB)
- Centre de recherche sur les maladies lipidiques (CRML)
- Centre de recherche sur les propriétés des interfaces et la catalyse (CERPIC)
- Centre de recherche sur les technologies de l'organisation réseau (CENTOR)
- Centre de recherche Université Laval-Robert-Giffard (CRULRG)
- Centre de santé et de services sociaux de la Vieille-Capitale (CLSC Haute-Ville-Des-** Rivières) (CSSSVC)
- Centre d'édition et de documentation Fonds Gustave-Guillaume (FGG)
- Centre d'étude de la forêt (CEF)
- Centre d'études interaméricaines (CEI)
- Centre d'études Marie-de-l'Incarnation (CEMI)
- Centre d'études nordiques (CEN)
- Centre d'excellence pour la santé buccodentaire et le vieillissement
- Centre d'optique, photonique et laser (COPL)
- Centre hospitalier affilié universitaire de Québec (CHA)
- Centre hospitalier universitaire de Québec (CHUQ)
- Centre interdisciplinaire de recherche en réadaptation et intégration sociale (CIRRIS)
- Centre interdisciplinaire de recherches sur les activités langagières (CIRAL)
- Centre interuniversitaire de recherche sur le saumon atlantique (CIRSA)
- Centre interuniversitaire d'études et de recherches autochthones (CIÉRA)
- Centre interuniversitaire d'études québécoises (CIEQ)
- Centre interuniversitaire d'études sur les lettres, les arts et les traditions (CELAT)
- Centre interuniversitaire en calcul mathématique algébrique (CICMA)
- Centre interuniversitaire sur le risque, les politiques économiques et l'emploi (CIRPÉE)
- Centre jeunesse de Québec (CJQ)

=== University of Saskatchewan ===
Saskatoon, Saskatchewan

NSERC Funding 2006/7 C$M 26.5 All Research Funding 2006/7 C$M 140.6

Number of Canada Research Chairs – 40

==== Internal Research Centers and Institutes (partial list) ====
- Canadian Centre for Health and Safety in Agriculture
- Canadian Centre for Nuclear Innovation
- Centre for High Performance Computing
- Global Institute for Food Security
- Institute For Computer and Information Technology
- Institute of Space and Atmospheric Studies
- Saskatchewan Drug Research Institute
- Saskatchewan Structural Sciences Centre
- Subatomic Physics Institute
- Toxicology Centre
- Plasma Physics Laboratory
- Saskatchewan Isotope Laboratory
- Research Centers and Institutes Operating with Independent Boards from The University
- Canadian Light Source – Synchrotron light source operated as a national facility
- Saskatchewan Population Health and Evaluation Research Unit, Inc.
- Vaccine and Infectious Disease Organization- Vaccine Research with Level 3 laboratory

=== Université de Montréal ===
Montreal, Quebec.

NSERC Funding 2003: C$M 21,759

Number of Canada Research Chairs – 93

==== Centres de recherche ====
- Agora Jules Dupuit (AJD)
- Centre d'excellence en Centre Canadien d'études allemandes et européennes (CCEAE)
- Centre d'excellence en Centre d'études et de recherches internationales (CERIUM)
- Centre d'excellence en Centre d'études ethniques des universités montréalaises (CEETUM)
- Centre d'excellence en Centre d'étude des religions de l'Université de Montréal (CERUM)
- Centre d'excellence en neuromique (CEN)
- Centre d'excellence en Centre d'excellence pour le développement des jeunes enfants (CEDJE)
- Centre d'excellence en Centre de droit des affaires et du commerce international (CDACI)
- Centre d'excellence en Centre de formation et d'expertise en recherche en administration des services infirmiers (FERASI)
- Centre d'excellence en Centre de recherche en droit public (CRDP)
- Centre d'excellence en Centre de recherche en éthique de l'Université de Montréal (CREUM)
- Centre d'excellence en Centre de recherche en neuropsychologie et cognition (CERNEC)
- Centre de recherche en reproduction animale (CRRA)
- Centre de recherche en sciences neurologiques (CRSN)
- Centre de recherche interdisciplinaire sur la violence familiale et la violence faite aux ** femmes (CRI-VIFF)
- Centre de recherche interdisciplinaire sur les problèmes conjugaux et les aggressions ** sexuelles (CRIPCAS)
- Centre de recherche interdisciplinaire sur les technologies émergentes (CITÉ)
- Centre de recherche interuniversitaire sur la formation et la profession enseignante (CRIFPE)
- Centre de recherche interuniversitaire sur la littérature et la culture québécoises (CRILCQ/U.Montréal)
- Centre de recherche interuniversitaire sur la mondialisation et le travail (CRIMT)
- Centre de recherche Léa-Roback sur les inégalités sociales de santé de Montréal
- Centre de recherche sur l'intermédialité (CRI)
- Centre de recherche sur les politiques et le développement social (CPDS)
- Centre de recherche sur les transports (CRT)
- Centre de recherches mathématiques (CRM)
- Centre des langues patrimoniales (CLP)
- Centre international de criminologie comparée (CICC)
- Centre interuniversitaire d'études démographiques (CIED)
- Centre interuniversitaire de recherche en économie quantitative CIREQ-CRDE
- Centre d'excellence en Centre interuniversitaire de recherche en toxicologie (CIRTOX)
- Centre d'excellence en Centre interuniversitaire québécois de statistiques sociales (CIQSS)
- Centre d'excellence en Centre Robert-Cedergren de l'Université de Montréal
- Centre d'excellence en Équipe de recherche et d'action en santé mentale et culture (ÉRASME)

==== Groupes de recherche ====
- Groupe d'astrophysique de l'Université de Montréal
- Groupe d'étude des protéines membranaires (GÉPROM)
- Groupe d'étude et de recherche sur la sécurité internationale (GERSI)
- Groupe de physique des particules (GPP)
- Groupe de physique numérique (PhysNum)
- Groupe de physique numérique des matériaux
- Groupe de recherche DÉFI Apprentissage (GDA)
- Groupe de recherche Diversité Urbaine (GRDU)
- Groupe de recherche en architecture urbaine (GRAU)
- Groupe de recherche en conception assistée par ordinateur (GRCAO)
- Groupe de recherche en conservation de l'environnement bâti (GRCEB)
- Groupe de recherche en épidémiologie des zoonoses et santé publique
- Groupe de recherche en gestion thérapeutique (GRGT)
- Groupe de recherche en linguistique du texte (GRELT)
- Groupe de recherche en médecine équine du Québec (GREMEQ)
- Groupe de recherche en modélisation biomédicale (GRMB)
- Groupe de recherche en physique et technologie des couches minces (GCM)
- Groupe de recherche en sciences de la vision (GRSV)
- Groupe de recherche en toxicologie humaine (TOXHUM)
- Groupe de recherche et d'action sur la victimisation des enfants – Alliance de recherche ** pour le développement des enfants dans leur communauté (GRAVE-ARDEC)
- Groupe de recherche et développement en gestion informatisée de la santé animale (DSA R&D)
- Groupe de recherche IF (GRIF)
- Groupe de recherche interdépartemental sur les conditions d'enseignement et d'apprentissage ** (GRICEA)
- Groupe de recherche interdisciplinaire en santé (GRIS)
- Groupe de recherche interuniversitaire en sciences infirmières de Montréal (GRISIM)
- Groupe de recherche interuniversitaire en tutoriel intelligent (GRITI)
- Groupe de recherche Language, Organisation et Gouvernance (LOG)
- Groupe de recherche sur l'apprentissage et l'évaluation multimédias interactifs (GRAEMI)
- Groupe de recherche sur l'avènement et la formation des institutions cinématographique et ** scénique (GRAFICS)
- Groupe de recherche sur l'Amérique latine (GRAL)
- Groupe de recherche sur l'inadaptation psychosociale chez l'enfant (GRIP)
- Groupe de recherche sur la démographie québécoise (GRDQ)
- Groupe de recherche sur le système nerveux autonome (GRSNA)
- Groupe de recherche sur le système nerveux central (GRSNC)
- Groupe de recherche sur les animaux de compagnie (GRAC)
- Groupe de recherche sur les aspects sociaux de la santé et de la prévention (GRASP)
- Groupe de recherche sur les environnements de travail (GRET)
- Groupe de recherche sur les jeunes et les médias (GRJM)
- Groupe de recherche sur les maladies infectieuses du porc (GREMIP)
- Groupe de recherche universitaire sur le médicament (GRUM)
- Immigration et métropoles, Centre de recherche interuniversitaire de Montréal sur l'immigration, l'intégration et la dynamique urbaine

==== Institutes de recherche ====
- Institut d'études européennes de l'Université de Montréal et de l'Université McGill
- Institut de biotechnologie vétérinaire et alimentaire (IBVA)
- Institut de recherche en biologie végétale (IRBV)
- Institut de recherche en immunologie et en cancérologie de l'Université de Montréal (IRIC)
- Institut international de recherche en éthique biomédicale (IIREB)
- Mila (research institute)

==== Laboratoires de recherche ====
- Laboratoire d'intégration des technologies informatiques à l'enseignement médical (LITIEM)
- Laboratoire d'étude de l'architecture potentielle (LEAP)
- Laboratoire de muséographie
- Laboratoire de recherche et d'intervention portant sur les politiques et les professions en ** éducation (LABRIPROF)
- Laboratoire de recherche sur les musiques du monde (LRMM)
- Laboratoire de recherches métaboliques sur le foie et l'exercice
- Laboratoire LexUM

==== Observatoires de recherche ====
- Observatoire de linguistique Sens-Texte (OLST)
- Observatoire du mont Mégantic (OMM)
- Observatoire international de la création musicale (OICM)
- Observatoire SITQ du développement urbain et immobilier
- Observatoire sur la ville intérieure

==== Réseaux de recherche ====
- Calcul Québec
- Réseau Biocontrôle
- Réseau de calcul et de modélisation mathématique (RCM2)
- Réseau québécois de recherche en synthèse organique (RQRSO)
- Unité de santé internationale (USI)

==== Centres de recherche hospitaliers ====
- Centre de recherche de l'Institut de Cardiologie de Montréal (ICM)
- Centre de recherche de l'Institut Philippe-Pinel de Montréal
- Centre de recherche de l'Institut universitaire de gériatrie de Montréal
- Centre de recherche de l'Hôpital du Sacré-Coeur
- Centre de recherche du Centre hospitalier de l'UdeM (CRCHUM)
- Centre de recherche du CHU Sainte-Justine
- Centre de recherche Fernand-Seguin de l'Hôpital Louis-H. Lafontaine
- Centre de recherche Guy-Bernier Hôpital Maisonneuve-Rosemont
- Centre de recherche interdisciplinaire en réadaptation du Montréal métropolitain (CRIR)
- Institut de recherches cliniques de Montréal (IRCM)
- Laboratoire de génétique et médecine génomique en inflammation
- Service de recherche de l'hôpital Rivière-des-Prairies

=== Queen's University ===
Kingston, Ontario

NSERC Funding 2003: C$M 21,571

Number of Canada Research Chairs – 54

==== University centres and institutes ====
- Centre for Neuroscience Studies (formerly Centre for the Study of Molecular Neuroscience)
- Centre for Water and the Environment
- GeoEngineering Centre
- High Performance Computing Virtual Laboratory (HPCVL)
- Human Mobility Research Centre
- Sudbury Neutrino Observatory Institute
- Southern African Research Centre

==== Faculty centres and institutes ====
- Cancer Research Institute
- Cancer Clinical Trials Division
- Cancer Biology & Genetics Division
- Cancer Care & Epidemiology Division
- Centre for Health Services and Policy Research
- Centre for International Relations Charles Pentland
- Centre for Manufacturing of Advanced Ceramics and Nanomaterials Vladimir Krstic
- Centre for Studies in Primary Care Richard Birtwhistle
- Centre for the Study of Democracy
- Fuel Cell Research Centre
- John Deutsch Institute for the Study of Economic Policy
- Industrial Relations Centre
- Institute for Intergovernmental Relations Thomas Courchene
- The Monieson Centre Yolande Chan
- Surveillance Studies Centre, David Murakami Wood

=== McMaster University ===
Hamilton, Ontario.

NSERC Funding 2003: C$M 20,694

Number of Canada Research Chairs – 62

==== Research institutes ====
- Origins Institute
- McMaster Institute for Applied Radiation Sciences(McIARS)
- McMaster Institute for Energy Studies
- McMaster Institute of Environment & Health
- Institute on Globalization and the Human Condition
- McMaster Institute for Molecular Biology & Biotechnology
- McMaster Institute for Polymer Production Technology
- McMaster Manufacturing Research Institute
- McMaster Palaeogenetics Institute (MPI)
- Population Health Research Institute (PHRI)
- Research Institute for Quantitative Studies in Economics & Population

==== Research centres ====
- Antimicrobial Research Centre
- Bertrand Russell Research Centre
- Brockhouse Institute for Materials Research
- Canadian Cochrane Centre
- CanChild Centre for Childhood Disability Research
- Centre for Advanced Polymer Processing & Design
- Centre for Electrophotonic Materials & Devices
- Centre for Functional Genomics
- Centre for Gene Therapeutics
- Centre for Evaluation of Medicines
- Centre for Health Economics and Policy Analysis
- Centre for Minimal Access Surgery
- Centre for Peace Studies
- Centre for Spatial Analysis
- Father Sean O'Sullivan Research Centre (St. Joseph's Hospital)
- Firestone Institute for Respiratory Health
- Henderson Research Centre
- Management of Innovation & New Technology Research Centre
- Mohawk-McMaster Institute for Applied Health Sciences
- McMaster Centre for Automotive Materials
- McMaster Ancient DNA Centre
- McMaster Centre for Pulp & Paper Research
- McMaster eBusiness Research Centre (MeRC)
- Network for Evaluation of Education and Training Technologies
- Offord Centre for Child Studies
- Population Health Research Institute
- R. Samuel McLaughlin Centre for Gerontological Health Research
- Research Centre for the Promotion of Women's Health
- Statistics Canada Research Data Centre
- Steel Research Centre
- Surgical Outcomes Research Centre

==== Research facilities ====
- Adaptive Systems Laboratory
- Applied Dynamics Laboratory
- Canadian International Labour Network
- Canadian Workers & Social Cohesion in a Global Era
- Communications Research Laboratory
- Earthquake Engineering Research Group
- Ecowise: The McMaster Eco-Research Program for Hamilton Harbour
- Flow Cytometry Facility
- Generalized Electronic Learning Group
- Geographical Information Systems Laboratory
- Health & Social Services Utilization Research Unit
- Health Information Research Unit
- High Throughput Screening Laboratory
- Independence and Economic Security of the Older Population
- Intestinal Disease Research Program
- Machining Systems Laboratory
- McMaster Advanced Control Consortium
- McMaster Experimental Economics Laboratory
- McMaster Health Sciences International
- McMaster Membrane Research Group
- McMaster Nuclear Reactor
- McMaster Working Group on the Middle Ages and Renaissance
- Mobix Lab
- Nursing Effectiveness, Utilization & Outcomes Research Unit
- Power Research Laboratory
- Program for Educational Research and Development
- Program in Policy Decision Making
- Robotics and Manufacturing Research Laboratory
- SHARCNET
- Smooth Muscle Research Program
- Social and Economic Dimensions of an Aging Population
- Software Engineering Research Group
- Supportive Cancer Care Research Unit
- Water Resources Environmental Information Systems Laboratory
- Walter W. Smeltzer Corrosion Laboratory
- William J. McCallion Planetarium
- Work Function Unit at the School of Rehabilitation Science

=== University of Manitoba ===
Winnipeg, Manitoba

NSERC Funding 2009/10 C$M 19.9

Number of Canada Research Chairs – 44

==== University research centres, institutes, facilities and groups ====
- Aerospace Materials Engineering Facility
- Applied Electromagnetics Facility
- Canadian Centre for Agri-food Research in Health and Medicine (with St. Boniface General Hospital and Agriculture and Agri-food Canada)
- Canadian Wheat Board Centre for Grain Storage Research
- Centre for Aboriginal Health Research (with Health Sciences Centre)
- Centre for Architectural Structures and Technology (C.A.S.T.)
- Centre for Defence and Security Studies
- Centre for Earth Observation Science (CEOS)
- Centre for Global Public Health
- Centre for Globalization and Cultural Studies
- Centre for Hellenic Civilization
- Centre for Higher Education Research and Development (CHERD)
- Centre for Human Models of Disease
- Centre for Professional and Applied Ethics
- Centre for the Research and Treatment of Atherosclerosis
- Centre on Aging
- Crystallography and Mineralogy Research Facility
- Digital Image Analysis Facility
- Great-West Life Manitoba Breast Cancer Research and Diagnosis Centre (with CancerCare Manitoba)
- Health, Leisure and Human Performance Research Institute
- Institute of Cardiovascular Sciences (with St. Boniface General Hospital)
- Institute for the Humanities
- Institute of Industrial Mathematical Sciences
- Internet Innovation Centre
- Legal Research Institute
- Manitoba Centre for Health Policy
- Manitoba Centre for Proteomics and Systems Biology (with Health Sciences Centre)
- Manitoba Institute of Cell Biology (with CancerCare Manitoba)
- Manitoba Centre for Nursing and Health Research (MCNHR)
- Manitoba Institute for Materials
- Manitoba Regional Materials and Surface Characterization Facility
- Manitoba Research Data Centre
- National Centre for Livestock and the Environment
- Nuclear Magnetic Resonance (NMR) Facility
- RESOLVE (Prairie Research Network on Family Violence)
- Richardson Centre for Functional Foods and Nutraceuticals (RCFFN)
- Spinal Cord Research Centre
- Transport Institute
- Winnipeg Institute for Theoretical Physics (with University of Winnipeg)
- W.R. McQuade Structural Engineering Laboratory

Research groups include:

- Aquatic Biology Research Group
- Community Acquired Infections Research Group
- Composite Materials and Structures Group
- Developmental Health Research Group
- Mood and Anxiety Disorders Research Group
- Psychiatric Neuroimaging Research Group

==== Centres of Excellence ====
- Allergen
- ArcticNet
- Auto21
- Canadian Arthritis Network
- Canadian Stroke Network
- Canadian Water Network
- GEOIDE
- Graphics, Animation and New Media Canada
- PrioNet Canada
- MITACS

=== University of Calgary ===
Calgary, Alberta.

NSERC Funding 2003: C$M 19,714

Number of Canada Research Chairs – 75

==== University research institutes and centres ====
- Alberta Global Forum
- Calgary Centre for Financial Research – under development
- Calgary Centre for Innovative Technology (CCIT)
- Calgary Institute for the Humanities]
- Canadian Centre for the Study of Higher Education
- Centre for Advanced Technologies of Life Sciences (CAT)
- Centre for Bioengineering Research and Education (CBRE)
- Centre for Environmental Engineering Research and Education (CEERE)
- Centre for Gifted Education
- Centre for Health and Policy Studies (CHAPS)
- Centre for Information Security and Cryptography
- Centre for Innovation Studies (THECIS)
- Centre for Mathematics in Life Sciences
- Centre for Microsystems Engineering (CME)
- Centre for Military and Strategic Studies (CMSS)
- Centre for Public Interest Accounting (CPIA)
- Centre for Research in the Fine Arts (CRFA)
- Centre for Social Work Research and Development
- iNFORMATICS Research Centre
- Institute for Advanced Policy Research
- Institute for Biocomplexity and Informatics
- Institute for Gender Research
- Institute for Quantum Science and Technology (formerly the Institute for Quantum Information Science)
- Institute for Space Research
- Institute for Sustainable Energy, Environment and Economy
- Institute for United States Policy Research
- Institute of Professional Communication (IPC)
- International Institute for Resource Industries and Sustainable Studies (IRIS)
- Kananaskis Field Stations
- Language Research Centre
- Latin American Research Centre (LARC)
- Markin Institute for Public Health
- Pipeline Engineering Centre (PEC)
- Risk Studies Centre
- World Tourism Education and Research Centre

==== Partnerships, institutes and centres ====
- Alberta Bone & Joint Health Institute
- Alberta Civil Liberties Research Centre
- Alberta Gaming Research Institute (AGRI)
- Alberta Sulpher Research Ltd.
- Alberta Synchrotron Institute (ASI)
- Arctic Institute of North America
- Bamfield Marine Sciences Centre
- Banff International Research Station]
- Canadian Energy Research Institute (CERI)]
- Canadian Institute of Resources Law
- Canadian Research Institute for Law and the Family
- Centre for Leadership and Learning
- Hotchkiss Brain Institute
- Institute of Health Economics (IHE)
- Institute of Infection, Immunity & Inflammation
- Institute of Maternal and Child Health
- Libin Cardiovascular Institute of Alberta
- Macleod Institute for Environmental Analysis
- McCaig Institute for Bone and Joint Health
- Pacific Institute for Mathematical Sciences
- Pine Creek Research Centre for Sustainable Water Resources
- Prairie Regional Data Centre
- Research and Education for Solutions to Violence and Abuse (RESOLVE)
- Southern Alberta Cancer Research Institute
- Telecommunications Research Laboratories (TRLabs)
- Van Horne Institute for International Transportation
- Vocational and Rehabilitation Research Institute, The (VRRI)

==== Centres of Excellence ====
- AUTO21
- Canadian Arthritis Network
- Canadian Bacterial Diseases Network (CBDN)
- Canadian Genetic Diseases Network (CGDN)
- Canadian Language & Literacy Research Network
- Canadian Stroke Network (CSN)
- Canadian Water Network (CWN)
- Institute for Robotics and Intelligent Systems (IRIS)
- Intelligent Sensing for Innovative Structures (ISIS)
- Mathematics of Information Technology and Complex Systems
- Micronet – Microelectronic Devices, Circuits and Systems
- PrioNet Canada
- PENCE Inc. Protein Engineering Network
- Stem Cell Network (STEMNet)
- Sustainable Forest Management Network (SFM)
- TeleLearning Network

=== University of Western Ontario ===
London, Ontario.

NSERC Funding 2003: C$M 17,288

Number of Canada Research Chairs – 61

==== Science research centres and facilities ====
- The Biotron Institute for Experimental Climate Change Research
- CCP Centre for Interdisciplinary Studies in Chemical Physics
- ERW Environmental Research Western
- ISW Interface Science Western
- Laboratory for Stable Isotope Science
- The Nanofabrication Laboratory
- ORCCA Ontario Research Centre for Computer Algebra
- POLARIS Portable Observatories for Lithosphere Analysis and Research
- SHARCNET Shared Hierarchical Academic Research Computing Network
- SSW Surface Science Western
- WINS Western Institute for Nanomaterials Science

==== Engineering research centres ====
- Advanced Fluid Mechanics Research Group
- Biomaterials and Medical Devices Research Group BM2D
- Biomedical Engineering
- Boundary Layer Wind Tunnel Laboratory
- Chemical Reactor Engineering Centre (CREC)
- Concurrent Engineering and Agile Manufacturing
- ECE Robotics and Real-Time Systems Lab
- Environmental Research Western
- Facility for Intelligent Decision Support (FIDS)
- Geotechnical Research Centre
- Institute for Catastrophic Loss Reduction (ICLR)
- Multi-Disciplinary Accident Research Team
- Optomechatronics Research Laboratory
- SHARCNet
- The Three Little Pigs Research Project at The Insurance Research Lab for Better Homes
- Western Fluidization Group

==== Health science research facilities ====
- Faculty Research Centres
- National Centre for Audiology
- Canadian Centre for Activity & Aging
- www.uwo.ca/actage
- www.ccaa-outreach.com
- International Centre for Olympic Studies
- Additional Research Facilities
- Kid Skills Research Laboratory
- National Rowing Centre
- Nursing Research Unit
- Western Qualitative Health Research Network
- The R. Samuel McLaughlin Foundation Exercise & Pregnancy Laboratory (EPL)
- Research Facilities
- School of Communication Sciences & Disorders
- School of Kinesiology
- School of Nursing
- School of Occupational Therapy
- School of Physical Therapy
- Canadian Language & Literacy Research Network (CLLRNet)

==== Social science research centres and research groups ====
- Aging and Health Research Centre
- Allan O'Brien Multilevel Governance Laboratory
- American Studies
- Animal Cognition Research Group
- Behavioural Neuroendocrinology Research Group
- Canadian Language and Literacy Research Network (collaborative)
- Centre for Avian Physiology, Neurobiology and Behavior
- Centre for the Brain and Mind
- Centre for the Study of International Economic Relations (CSIER)
- Centre for the Study of Theory and Criticism
- Child Development Research Facility
- CIBC Human Capital and Productivity Project
- CIHR Group for Action and Perception
- Culture, Cognition and Behavior Research Group (a collaboration with Sociology and Anthropology)
- Institute for Catastrophic Loss Reduction
- Intergroup Relations and Social Justice Research Group
- Kilee Patchell-Evans Autism Research Group
- Moral, Political and Legal Philosophy Research Group
- Nationalism and Ethnic Conflict Research Group
- Philosophy and Psychology Research Group (a collaboration with Philosophy)
- Political Economy Research Group (PERG)
- Population Studies Centre
- Psychoneuroimmunology Research Group
- Research Unit for Work and Productivity
- RBC Financial Group Economic Policy Research Institute (EPRI)
- Self-Regulation Research Group (collaboration for Social, Development, Clinical and Behavioral and Cognitive Neuroscience areas)
- The Aboriginal Policy Research Consortium
- Transition Economies Research Forum (TERF)
- Workforce Aging in the New Economy

==== Affiliated research institutes ====
- Robarts Research Institute
- Lawson Health Research Institute
- London Regional Cancer Program

=== Dalhousie University ===
Halifax, Nova Scotia.

NSERC Funding 2003: C$M 14,839

Number of Canada Research Chairs – 50

==== Research centres, institutes, and groups ====
- Atlantic Centre of Excellence for Women's Health
- Atlantic Health Promotion Research Centre
- Atlantic Institute of Criminology
- Atlantic Research Data Centre (ARDC)
- Centre for African Studies
- Centre for Foreign Policy Studies
- Dalhousie Infectious Disease Research Alliance (DIDRA)
- Dalhousie Inflammation Group
- Dalhousie Multiple Sclerosis Research Unit
- Energy at Dalhousie
- Health Law Institute
- International Ocean Institute
- Law and Technology Institute
- Marine and Environmental Law Institute
- Neuroscience Institute
- Pediatric Pain Research Lab
- Population Health Research Unit (PHRU)
- Institute for Research in Materials

==== Technical research facilities ====
- Aquatron
- Atlantic Region Magnetic Resonance Centre
- Canadian Institute of Fisheries Technology (CIFT)
- Canadian Residential Energy End-use Data and Analysis Center (CREEDAC)
- Centre for Water Resources Studies (CWRS)
- Cosmogenic Nuclide Exposure Dating Facility
- Minerals Engineering Centre (MEC)
- Nova Scotia CAD/CAM Centre (NSCCC)
- Slowpoke Facility
- Trace Analysis Research Centre (TARC)

==== Affiliated research organizations ====
- IWK Health Centre
- Global Information Networking Institute
- The Nova Scotia Hospital,
- QEII Health Sciences Centre
- Saint John Regional Hospital

=== University of Ottawa ===
Ottawa, Ontario.

NSERC Funding 2003: C$M 14,127

Number of Canada Research Chairs – 49

==== uOttawa research centres and institutes ====
- Centre for Advanced Research in Environmental Genomics (CAREG)
- Centre for Catalysis Research and Innovation
- Centre for Hazard Mitigation and Emergency Management
- Centre for Interdisciplinary Research on Citizenship and Minority Studies (CIRCEM)
- Centre for Neural Dynamics
- Centre for Research in Biopharmaceuticals and Biotechnology
- Centre for Research in Photonics
- Centre for Research on Educational and Community Services (CRECS)
- Centre for Research on Environmental Microbiology (CREM)
- Centre for Research on French Canadian Culture
- Centre on Governance
- CGA Accounting Research Centre
- CGA Tax Research Centre
- Human Rights Research and Education Centre
- Institute for the Prevention of Crime (IPC)
- Institute of Canadian Studies
- Institute of Population Health
- Institute of the Environment
- Institute for Science, Society and Policy
- Institute of Women's Studies
- Research Centre for Sport in Canadian Society
- University of Ottawa Centre for Neuromuscular Disease

==== Affiliated research institutes ====
- Kidney Research Centre
- Ottawa Hospital Research Institute (OHRI)
- University of Ottawa Eye Institute
- The Ottawa Hospital Regional Cancer Centre
- University of Ottawa Heart Institute
- Children's Hospital of Eastern Ontario Research Institute
- Institute of Mental Health Research
- Élisabeth Bruyère Research Institute

=== University of Guelph ===
Guelph, Ontario.

Number of Canada Research Chairs – 39 UoG ranks 14th among the top 50 research universities in Canada, but is not a member of U15.

==== Research Centres, Institutes and Groups ====
- Guelph-Waterloo Center for Graduate Work in Chemistry and Biochemistry (GWC2)
- Guelph-Waterloo Physics Institute (GWPI)
- Advanced Analysis Centre
- Advanced Foods and Materials Network (AFMNet)
- Advanced Robotics & Intelligent Systems Lab
- Agri-Technology Commercialization Centre
- Aquaculture Centre
- AquaSanitas – A Centre for Water Safety and Security
- Arboretum Gene Bank
- Axelrod Institute of Ichthyology
- Bioconversion Network
- Biophysics Interdepartmental Group (BIG)
- Biodiversity Institute of Ontario
- Bioproducts Discovery and Development Centre
- Business Development Office
- Centre for the Study of Animal Welfare
- Canadian Agricultural Trade Policy and Competitive Research Network
- Canadian Arthritis Network Core Facility
- Canadian Co-operative Wildlife Health Centre
- Canadian Language and Literacy Research Network
- Canadian Pollination Initiative
- Canadian Research Institute in Food Safety (CRIFS)
- Centre for Agricultural Renewable Energy and Sustainability
- Centre for Biodiversity Genomics
- Centre for Food and Soft Materials Science
- Centre for the Genetic Improvement of Livestock
- Centre for Land and Water Stewardship
- Centre for Nutrition Modelling
- Centre for Psychological Services
- Centre for Public Health and Zoonoses
- Controlled Environment Systems Research Facility
- Couple and Family Therapy Centre
- Electrochemical Technology Centre
- Food Safety Network
- Genomics Facility/Advanced Analysis Centre
- Guelph Food Technology Centre (GFTC)
- Guelph Transgenic Plant Research Complex
- Guelph Turfgrass Institute (GTI)
- Hagen Aqualab
- Health and Performance Centre
- Human Nutraceutical Research Unit
- Institute for Comparative Cancer Investigation
- Institute for Robotics & Intelligent Systems
- International Leadership Research Network
- Laboratory Services
- Landscape Architecture Community Outreach Centre
- Mathematics of Information Technology and Complex Systems
- Metals in the Human Environment Research Network
- Nuclear Magnetic Resonance Centre
- Organization and Management Solution
- Ontario Rural Wastewater Centre
- Poultry Welfare Centre
- Research Programs (U of G / OMAFRA enhanced partnership)
- Shared Hierarchical Academic Research Computing Network
- Sudbury Neutrino Observatory
- TransCanada Institute
- Urban Systems Environment Design Centre
- Veterinary Teaching Hospital
- Weather Innovation Centre

== Networks of Centers of Excellence ==
=== Health and life sciences ===
- Accel-Rx Health Sciences Accelerator – Accel-Rx (2014–2019) – Vancouver, British Columbia,
- Aging Gracefully across Environments using Technology to Support Wellness, Engagement and Long Life – AGE-WELL (2014–2019) – Toronto Rehabilitation Institute – University Health Network, Toronto, Ontario,
- Allergy, Genes and Environment Network – AllerGen (2004–2019) – McMaster University, Hamilton, Ontario,
- Biotherapeutics for Cancer Treatment – BioCanRx (2014–2019) – Ottawa Hospital Research Institute, Ottawa, Ontario,
- Canadian Frailty Network – CFN (2012–2017) – Queen's University, Kingston, Ontario,
- Canadian Glycomics Network – GlycoNet (2014–2019) – University of Alberta, Edmonton, Alberta,
- Cardiac Arrhythmia Network of Canada – CANet (2014–2019) – Western University, London, Ontario,
- CellCAN Regenerative Medicine and Cell Therapy Network – CellCAN (2014–2018) – Hôpital Maisonneuve-Rosemont, Montréal, Quebec,
- Centre for Commercialization of Cancer Immunotherapy – C3i (2016–2021) – Montréal, Quebec,
- Centre for Commercialization of Regenerative Medicine – CCRM (2011–2017) – Toronto, Ontario,
- Centre for Drug Research and Development – CDRD (2008–2018) – Vancouver, British Columbia,
- Centre for Imaging Technology Commercialization – CIMTEC (2011–2018) – London, Ontario,
- Centre for Probe Development and Commercialization – CPDC (2008–2018) – Hamilton, Ontario,
- Centre for Surgical Invention and Innovation – CSII (2009–2017) – Hamilton, Ontario,
- Centre for the Commercialization of Antibodies and Biologics – CCAB (2014–2019) – Toronto, Ontario,
- Children and Youth in Challenging Contexts – CYCC (2011–2019) – Dalhousie University, Halifax, Nova Scotia,
- CQDM (2009–2017) – Montréal, Quebec,
- Exactis Innovation – Exactis (2014–2019) – Montreal, Quebec,
- MedDev Commercialization Centre – MDCC (2014–2019) – University of Ottawa Heart Institute, Ottawa, Ontario,
- NEOMED (2014–2018) – Montréal, Quebec,
- NeuroDevNet (2009–2019) – University of British Columbia, Vancouver, British Columbia,
- Pan-Provincial Vaccine Enterprise – PREVENT (2008–2017) – Saskatoon, Saskatchewan,
- Promoting Relationships and Eliminating Violence Network – PREVNet (2005–2009) – Queen's University, Kingston, Ontario and York University, Toronto, Ontario,
- Stem Cell Network – SCN (2000–2011) – University of Ottawa, Ottawa, Ontario,
- The Prostate Centre's Translational Research Initiative for Accelerated Discovery and Development – PC-TRiADD (2008–2018) – Vancouver, British Columbia,
- Translating Emergency Knowledge for Kids – TREKK (2011–Present) – University of Manitoba, Winnipeg, Manitoba

=== Information and communication ===
- Canadian Digital Media Network – CDMN (2009–2019) – Kitchener, Ontario,
- Centre of Excellence in Next Generation Networks – CENGN (2014–2019) – Ottawa, Ontario,
- MiQro Innovation Collaborative Centre – C2MI (2011–20121) – Bromont, Quebec,
- Smart Cybersecurity Network – SERENE-RISC (2014–2018) – Université de Montréal, Montréal, Quebec,
- Wavefront (2011–20121) – Vancouver, British Columbia

=== Environment ===
- ArcticNet (2003–2018) – Université Laval, Québec, Quebec
- Canadian Water Network – CWN (2001–2017) – University of Waterloo, Waterloo, Ontario
- Green Aviation Research and Development Network – GARDN (2009–2018) – Montréal, Quebec,
- Marine Environmental, Observation, Prediction and Response Network – MEOPAR (2012–2017) – Dalhousie University, Halifax, Nova Scotia,
- Ocean Networks Canada Innovation Centre – ONC Innovation Centre (2009–2018) – Victoria, British Columbia

=== Natural resources ===
- BioFuelNet (2012–2017) – McGill University, Montréal, Quebec,
- Leading Operational Observations and Knowledge for the North – LOOKNorth (2011–2020) – St. John's, Newfoundland and Labrador,
- TECTERRA (2009–2016) – Calgary, Alberta,
- Ultra Deep Mining Network – UDMN (2014–2018) – Sudbury, Ontario

=== Manufacturing and engineering ===
- Refined Manufacturing Acceleration Process – ReMAP (2014–2018) – Toronto, Ontario

=== Cross-sectoral ===
- Advanced Applied Physics Solutions Inc. – AAPS (2008–2017) – Vancouver, British Columbia,
- GreenCentre Canada – GCC (2009–2019) – Kingston, Ontario,
- India-Canada Centre for Innovative Multidisciplinary Partnerships to Accelerate Community Transformation and Sustainability – IC-IMPACTS (2012–2017), University of British Columbia, Vancouver, British Columbia,
- MaRS Innovation – MI (2008–2017) – Toronto, Ontario,
- Natural Products Canada – NPC (2016–2021) – Charlottetown, Prince Edward Island

== Notable university-related research organizations and projects ==
=== Domestic ===
- Perimeter Institute for Theoretical Physics – University of Waterloo, Waterloo, Ontario
  - Organization for the theoretical study of gravity, quantum mechanics and cosmology
- Canadian Institute for Advanced Research – HQ, Toronto, Ontario
  - A virtual institute for the study of cosmology, gravity, geology, biology, nanotechnology and other advanced scientific topics
- Sudbury Neutrino Observatory – Sudbury, Ontario
  - Underground observatory for the study of neutrinos
- Tri-University Meson Facility (TRIUMF) – University of British Columbia, Vancouver, British Columbia
  - Particle accelerator for the study of mesons
- Remotely Operated Platform for Ocean Science (ROPOS)
  - Robotic study of Canada's Pacific Ocean floor
- Lithoprobe
  - Canada's largest earth sciences project involving researchers from universities, the private sector and the federal government.
- Globec Canada
  - Project for the study of the effect of environmental change on ocean life.
- Ottawa Hospital Research Institute
  - A key medical research centre with a focus on cancer research, specifically the use of oncolytic viruses.

=== International ===
- High Energy Physics – CERN (Geneva) the Large Hadron Collider and the Atlas Experiment
  - Canada's participation in the world's largest physics project coordinated by the TRIUMF Particle Physics Research Centre at the University of British Columbia in Vancouver.
- The Gemini Project
  - Canada's participation in the construction of large astronomical telescopes in Hawaii and Chile.
- Canada and the Ocean Drilling Project
  - Canada's participation in an international programme studying the Earth's crust under the oceans.
- The North Water Project
  - Canada's participation in an international project studying open water areas of the Arctic Ocean

== Research and development expenditures in Canada by sector ==
Canadian Gross Expenditure on R&D (GERD) by Performing Sectors – 2006 Estimates, C$ Millions

- Business Enterprises: 14,850, 52.4%
- Higher Education: 10,890, 38.4%
- Federal Government: 2,145, 7.6%
- Provincial Government: 345, 1.2%
- Provincial Research Organizations: 127, 0.4%
- Total: 28,357, 100.0%

== Support organizations ==
- Natural Sciences and Engineering Research Council – Ottawa, Ontario (Federal government funding agency for Canadian university research)
- Canadian Institutes of Health Research
- Social Sciences and Humanities Research Council of Canada – Ottawa, Ontario (Federal government funding agency for Canadian university research)
- Canada Research Chair – Ottawa, Ontario (Federal government funding agency for special Canadian university research staffing)
- Canadian Foundation for Innovation – Ottawa, Ontario (Federal government funding agency for research infrastructure for Canadian universities, colleges, research hospitals, and non-profit research institutions)
- CANARIE, Canadian Advanced Network and Research for Industry and Education
- Foundations in Canada – This is a list of philanthropic organizations in Canada. A number of these organization make financial contributions to university research in Canada.

== See also ==
- Canadian government scientific research organizations
- Canadian industrial research and development organizations
- U15 (universities)
- List of Canadian nuclear facilities
- Science and technology in Canada
- Royal Society of Canada
