= Outline of wine =

Alcoholic drink made by fermentation of grapes or other fruits and foods

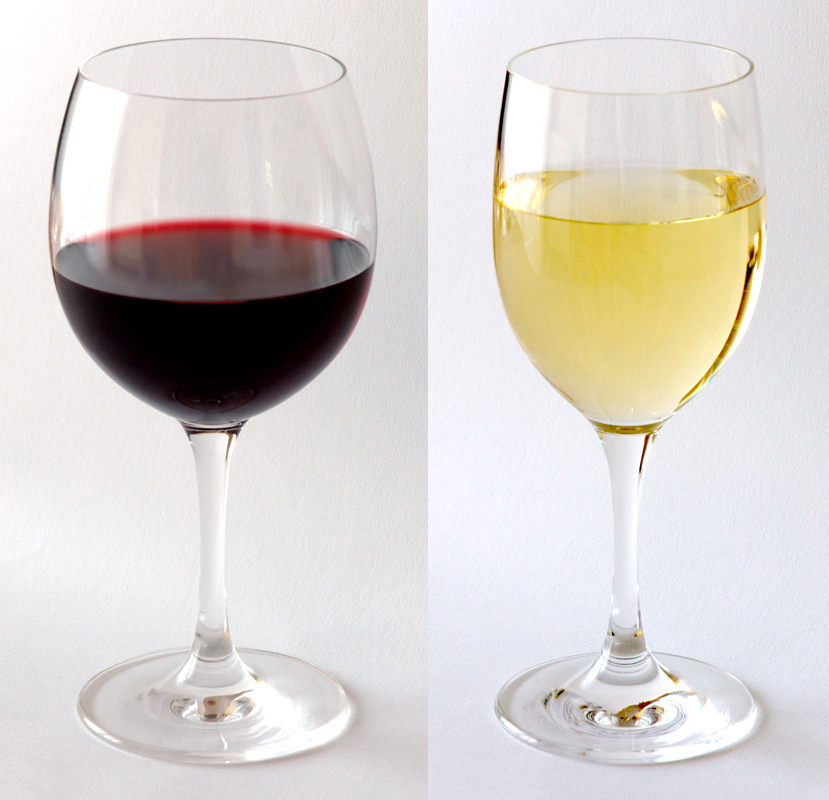
Glasses of red and white wine

The following outline is provided as an overview of and topical guide to wine:

Wine – alcoholic beverage typically made of fermented grape juice. The natural chemical balance of grapes is such that they can ferment without the addition of sugars, acids, enzymes or other nutrients. Wine is produced by fermenting crushed grapes using various types of yeast. Yeast consumes the sugars found in the grapes and converts them into alcohol. Different varieties of grapes and strains of yeasts are used depending on the type of wine being produced.

== Ingredients and chemistry of wine ==
Wine includes the following ingredients:

- Ethanol – the type of alcohol found in alcoholic beverages. It is a volatile, flammable, colorless liquid, and also a psychoactive drug.
- Fermented grape juice – what wine is made from
  - Fermentation – process that turns grape juice into an alcoholic beverage. During fermentation yeast interact with sugars in the juice to create ethanol.
  - Grape – fruit that grows on the perennial and deciduous woody vines of the genus Vitis. Grapes can be eaten raw or used for making jam, juice, vinegar, wine, raisins, and grape seed oil.
  - Juice – the liquid that is naturally contained in fruit or vegetable tissue.

Scientific makeup:

- Wine chemistry
  - Acids in wine
  - Phenolic compounds in wine
  - Proteins in wine
  - Sugars in wine
  - Yeast assimilable nitrogen
  - Minerals
  - Dissolved gas (CO_{2})
  - Monoterpenes and sesquiterpenes
  - Glutathione

== Types of wine ==
=== Wine styles ===
- Aromatized wine – A fortified wine with added herbs, spices, or flavorings.
- Dessert wine – A category of sweet wines served with dessert.
- Fortified wine – Fortified wine is a wine that has had a distilled spirit added to it in order to end fermentation, help preservation, or influence flavor. The addition of additional ethanol kills yeast, leaving a wine that is high in sugar and alcohol content.
- Fruit wine – Fruit wine is a fermented alcoholic beverage made from a variety of base ingredients and can be made from virtually any plant matter that can be fermented. The fruits used in winemaking are fermented using yeast and aged in wood barrels to improve the taste and flavor quality.
- Ice wine – Ice wine is a type of dessert wine made from frozen grapes. Grapes are frozen on the vine around 20 °F (-7 °C), and later crushed in a grape press. The sugars in the grapes do not freeze, thus creating wine with higher sugar concentrations. Ice wine production is risky because many grapes do not survive the cold temperatures—resulting in ice wines being generally expensive.
- Orange wine – Amber wine gets its name from its deep orange color. This wine is made by leaving white wine grapes in contact with the skins, stems, and seeds during fermentation.
- Red wine – A still wine with red to purple hues created by grape skin pigments, made from dark-colored grapes
- Rosé – Rosé is a style of wine that is made by juicing red grapes and allowing them to macerate for a short period to give the juice a pinkish hue. The maceration step only lasts two to three days and after that, the skins are removed, and the juice is allowed to ferment. Provence, France is the region that is most famous for the best rosés in the world.
- Sparkling wine – Sparkling wine is made by fermenting wine twice. During the second fermentation, the wine is aged with lees at the bottom of the wine barrel. While the wine is being aged, the autolysis of yeast occurs which gives the wine the sparkling component.
- Straw wine – Straw wines are made from a centuries-old method of laying grapes out on straw mats for long periods to be dehydrated by the sun. The dehydration results in more concentrated flavors and sugars in the grapes, leading to typically sweeter wines. They are often paired with desserts, fruit, and charcuterie, or served as an aperitif.
- Table wine
- White wine – A clear to yellow wine made from white grapes or dark-colored grapes

== Grape varieties ==
Grape varieties – below are some examples of grape varieties from which wine is made: (This list does not render on mobile; try the Desktop view link at the bottom of the page)

== Wine by country and region ==
- Argentina
  - Mendoza – Prominent for Malbec, Cabernet Sauvignon, and Tempranillo
  - San Juan – Argentina's second largest wine producer, with Syrah, Bonardo, sherry-style wines, brandies, and vermouth.
  - La Rioja – The small region produces Moscatel de Alexandrias and Torrontés made from a local sub-variety known as Torrontés Riojano.
  - Northwestern regions –
  - Patagonia – The source for much of Argentina's sparkling wine
- Australia
  - New South Wales –
  - South Australia –
  - Tasmania –
  - Victoria –
  - Western Australia –
  - Queensland –
- Chile
  - Central Valley –
- France
  - Alsace –
  - Bordeaux –
  - Burgundy –
  - Champagne –
  - Corsica –
  - Jura –
  - Languedoc-Roussillon –
  - Loire –
  - Provence –
  - Rhône –
  - Savoy –
  - South West –

=== Classification systems ===
- European Union: Protected Designation of Origin (PDO)
  - Austria: Districtus Austriae Controllatus (DAC)
  - Cyprus: Ελεγχόμενη Ονομασία Προέλευσης
  - France: Appellation d'origine contrôlée (AOC)
  - Germany: German wine classification
  - Greece: ονομασία προελεύσεως ελεγχομένη
  - Italy: Denominazione di Origine Controllata (DOC)
  - Luxembourg: Appellation contrôlée
  - Portugal: Denominação de Origem Controlada (DOC)
  - Romania: Denumire de Origine Controlată (DOC)
  - Spain: Denominación de origen protegida (DOP)
- Switzerland: Appellation d'origine contrôlée (AOC)
- Australia: Geographical Indications (GI)
- Argentina: Denominación de origen - see also Argentine wine
- Canada: Vintners Quality Alliance (VQA)
- Brazil: Denominação de Origem (DO)
- Chile: see Chilean wine
- South Africa: Wine of Origin (WO)
- United Kingdom: Protected Designation of Origin (PDO)
- United States: American Viticultural Area (AVA)

== Wine industry ==
=== Wine packaging ===
- Wine label –

Types of wine packages

- Bottle –
- Box and bag –
- Jug –

Seals

- Wine cork
- Alternative wine closure
- Screw cap

=== Accessories ===
- Wine glass
- Corkscrew
- Decanter

=== Wine professions and qualifications ===
- Vintner –
- Master of Wine –
- Winemaker –
- Court of Master Sommeliers
- Wine & Spirit Education Trust

=== Trends and impacts ===
- Wine club –
- Globalization of wine –
- Global warming and wine –

== Wine production ==
- Winery –
- Vineyard –
- Viticulture –
  - Annual growth cycle of grapevines –
  - Ripeness in viticulture –
- Winemaking –
  - Harvest –
    - Mechanical harvesting –
  - Pressing (wine)
    - Wine press – device used to extract juice from crushed grapes during wine making.
    - History of the wine press
  - Must – freshly pressed fruit juice (usually grape juice) that contains the skins, seeds, and stems of the fruit.
    - Pomace – solid remains of grapes, olives, or other fruit after pressing for juice or oil. It contains the skins, pulp, seeds, and stems of the fruit. In winemaking, the length of time that the pomace stays in the juice is critical for the final character of the wine.
  - Fermentation –
    - Co-fermentation –
  - Maceration – the soaking of fruit skins and other material in must that is an important process by which phenolics and volatiles present in the unprocessed fruit may be extracted. Maceration time has a primary role in the appearance and sensory attributes of the finished wine.
  - Malolactic fermentation –
  - Oak in wine production –
- Storage of wine –
- Aging of wine –

== Wine selecting ==
- Wine and food pairing –
- Wine competitions –
- Wine tasting –
  - Blind tasting of wine –
  - Vertical and horizontal wine tasting –

== Wine in culture ==
- Christianity and wine –
- Cocktails with wine, sparkling wine, or port –
- Comité Régional d'Action Viticole –
- Cult wines –
- Drinking culture –
- Dionysus –
- Standard drink –

== Wine and health ==
- Alcohol –
  - Short-term effects of alcohol consumption –
    - Alcohol intoxication –
    - Alcohol and sex –
    - Blood alcohol content –
  - Long-term effects of alcohol consumption –
    - Alcohol dementia –
    - Alcohol and cancer –
    - Alcohol and cardiovascular disease –
    - Alcohol and weight –
    - Alcoholism –
      - Alcohol abuse –
      - Alcohol dependence –
      - Alcohol withdrawal syndrome –
    - Fetal alcohol syndrome –
  - Alcohol consumption recommendations –
- French Paradox –
- Phenolic compounds in wine –
  - Polyphenol antioxidant –
  - Resveratrol –
- Red wine headache –

== History of wine ==
=== By period ===
- Neolithic Period – The earliest marks of viticulture can be traced back to Georgia, where archaeologists found grape pips similar to those of vitis vinifera sativa from as early as the 6th millennium B.C. Wine production during this period was most likely done through the use of kvevri, large earthenware pottery used for fermentation and storage.
- Ancient Greece and wine – The ancient Greeks pioneered new methods of viticulture and wine production which they shared with early winemaking communities in what are now France, Italy, Austria and Russia, as well as others through trade and colonization.
- Ancient Rome and wine –
- Champagne Riots –
- Ancient Scandinavia – The Ancient Scandinavians produced a grog that was an alcoholic mixture of grains, honey, herbs, fruits, and occasionally even grape wine. Grog has been dated to the years 1500-200 BC, and Ancient Greek and Roman texts have dismissed grog as "barley rotted in water" rather than actual wine.

=== By region ===
- Africa
  - History of South African wine
- Asia
  - Wine in the Middle East
- Europe
  - History of French wine
    - History of Bordeaux wine
  - History of Portuguese wine
  - History of Spanish wine
    - History of Rioja wine
    - History of Sherry
- North America
  - History of American wine
    - History of California wine
    - History of Oregon wine production

== Organizations and institutions ==
- Academie du Vin –
- American Society for Enology and Viticulture –
- APCOR (Portugal) –
- ASDW Association of Small Direct Wine Merchants (United Kingdom) –
- Assembly of European Wine-producing Regions –
- Australian Society of Viticulture and Oenology –
- Australian Wine Research Institute –
- Comite Interprofessionnel du Vin de Champagne –
- Comité Régional d'Action Viticole –
- Cool Climate Oenology and Viticulture Institute (Canada) –
- Garagistes (France) –
- Geilweilerhof Institute for Grape Breeding (Germany) –
- Geisenheim Grape Breeding Institute (Germany) –
- Institut National des Appellations d'Origine –
- International Organisation of Vine and Wine –
- L'Academie du Vin –
- Missouri Valley Wine Society –
- Wine Institute (California) –
- Wine Institute of New Zealand –
- Wine Research Centre (Canada) –
- Wine and Spirit Trade Association (United Kingdom) –

== Publications ==
- Australian & New Zealand Wine Industry Journal –
- Wine Spectator –

== Other ==
- Beaujolais Day –
- The Berthomeau Report –
- Fighting varietals –
- House wine –
- Plan Bordeaux –
- Prohibition –
- Riesling Trail –
- Semi-generic –
- Sake –
- Super Tuscans –
- Temperance movement –
- Terroir –
- Wine defect –
- Wine list –
- Wine Parkerization –

== Persons influential in the field of wine ==
- List of wine personalities
- Kathy Arnink –
- Oz Clarke –
- Antonio Galloni –
- James Halliday –
- Kermit Lynch –
- Robert Mondavi –
- Russ Moss –
- Robert Parker –
- Jancis Robinson –
- Michel Rolland –

== Wine-related films and television ==
- Falcon Crest –
- Mondovino –
- Sideways –
- Wine TV –
- Bottle Shock –
