= EWG =

EWG may refer to:

- Eastern Washington Gateway Railroad, an American railroad
- East-West Gateway Council of Governments, a planning organization in Greater St. Louis, United States
- Election Working Group, a Bangladeshi civic organization
- Electron withdrawing group
- Energy Watch Group, an international energy think tank
- English Whisky Guild, an organization
- Environmental Working Group, an American environmental organization
- Eurogroup Working Group, an advisory body to the Eurogroup of the European Union
- Eurowings (ICAO code EWG), a German airline
