= CWN =

CWN may refer to:

- Canadian Water Network, a water organization in Canada
- Catholic World News, online independent news service
- Clean Water Network, an American public-policy non-profit organization
- CWN (TV station), an Australian television station
