= McMaster Faculty of Engineering =

Engineering school of McMaster University in Hamilton, Ontario

Coordinates: 43.26076°N 79.92047°W

- Type: Public engineering school
- Established: 1958; 68 years ago
- Affiliations: McMaster University
- Dean: Heather Sheardown
- Students: 5,500
- Location: Hamilton, Ontario, Canada
- Website: eng.mcmaster.ca

The McMaster Faculty of Engineering is the engineering school of McMaster University in Hamilton, Ontario, Canada. The faculty was established in 1958 and was the first engineering program to developed problem-based learning curriculum. It currently has seven departments in chemical engineering, civil engineering, computing and software, electrical and computer engineering, engineering physics, material science and engineering and mechanical engineering. The faculty offers bachelors, masters, and doctoral degrees.

The faculty is home to 1 Canada Excellence Research Chair, 13 Canada Research Chairs, 4 Natural Sciences and Engineering Research Council chairs, and 14 Endowed Chairs.

== Programs ==
The B.Eng. undergraduate programs are accredited through the Canadian Engineering Accreditation Board. All undergraduate students take a common first-year program which outlines the fundamentals of engineering disciplines. At the end of the first year, students choose one of fourteen program disciplines. This includes some five-year programs such as Engineering & Management, Engineering & Society, or streams in Integrated Biomedical Engineering and Health Sciences.

Graduate programs in biomedical engineering are offered through the School of Biomedical Engineering, and graduate engineering practice programs through the Walter G. Booth School of Engineering Practice.

The joint McMaster-Mohawk Bachelor of Technology program offers four-year bachelor-degree programs in engineering technology, including process automation technology, biotechnology and automotive and vehicle technology, as well as degree-completion programs in civil engineering infrastructure technology, computing and information technology, energy engineering technology and manufacturing engineering technology.

== History ==
In 1956, McMaster named its first Director of Engineering Studies – Dr. John W. Hodgins, a Chemical Engineering professor from the Royal Military College – to develop a full engineering program for the university. The program was approved by the McMaster University Senate in February 1958. The engineering building, now John Hodgins Engineering Building, officially opened a few months later. The first class of 25 students graduated in 1961.

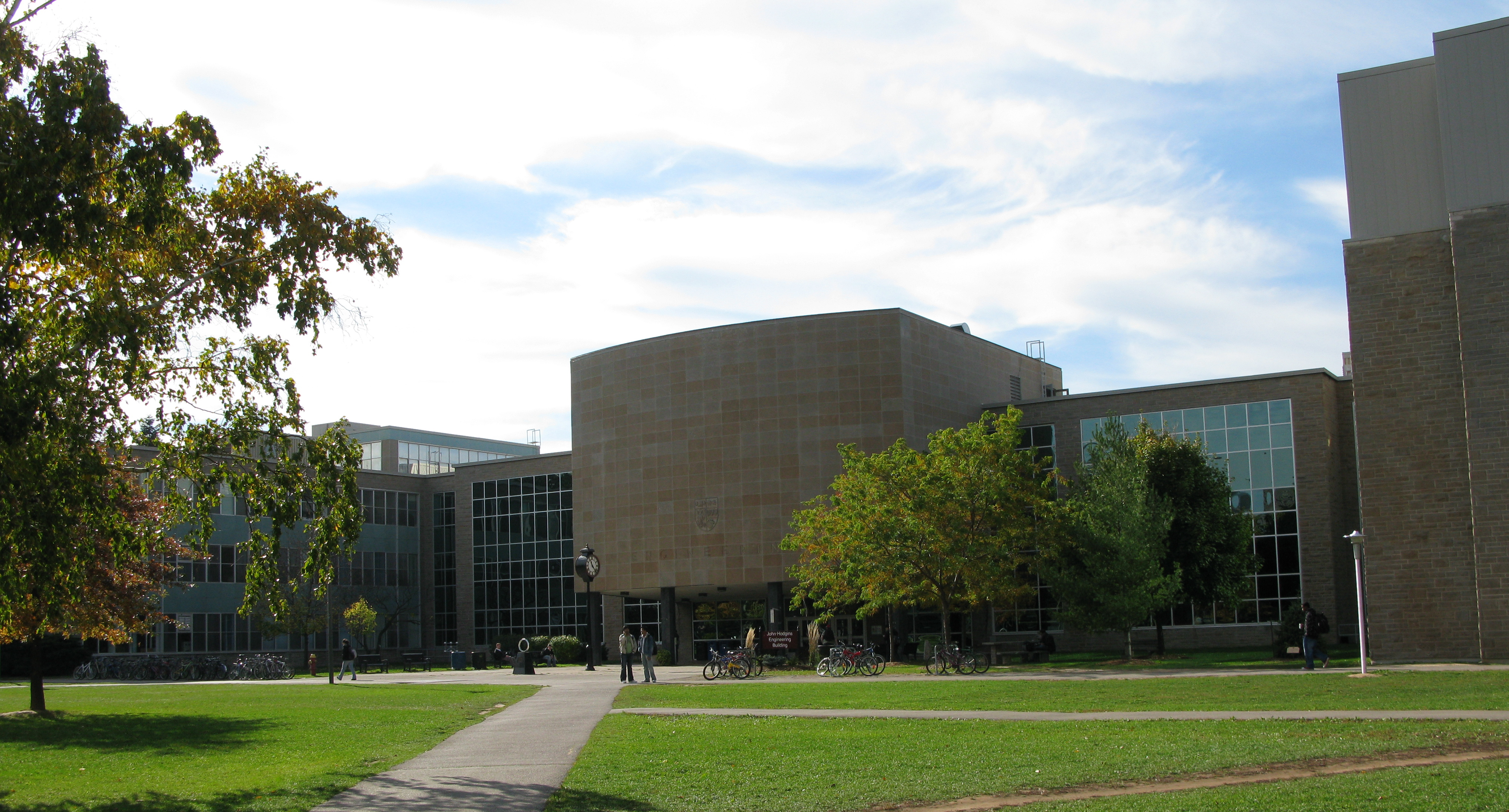
John Hodgins Engineering Building prior to renovation in 2016

Five departments were established in the first two years – Chemical, Civil, Electrical, Mechanical and Metallurgical Engineering — and, later, Engineering Physics joined them. The first engineering degrees from McMaster were Master of Engineering (M.Eng.) degrees, with the first ones awarded in 1959. The first doctoral degrees (Ph.D.) were awarded in 1965.

In 1972 over 100 engineers received their Bachelor of Engineering degrees, with the annual total passing 200 by 1980, and in 2014 this number equaled 588.

1971 marked the start of the Engineering and Management program and later that decade, the Engineering and Society program began. In the early 1980s, the Electrical Engineering started its unique Computer Engineering program, and Mechanical Engineering began its program in Manufacturing Engineering.

The Faculty of Engineering began joint faculty appointments, research associates and collaborative research activities with McMaster's Faculty of Health Sciences. Courses in Biomedical Engineering were offered as electives in all engineering programs.

In 1997, the Faculty of Engineering began a joint venture with the Department of Engineering Technology at Mohawk College and created the Bachelor of Technology program.

In 2021, McMaster Faculty of Engineering joined with the University of Waterloo, University of Toronto, Queen's University and University of Western Ontario to form an academic partnership called the IBET PhD Project, to increase academic and industry diversity by creating new fellowships for Indigenous and Black students pursuing doctoral degrees in mathematics and engineering to prepare for careers as professors and industry researchers.

=== Ranking ===
The 2017 Shanghai Ranking's Global Ranking of Academic Subjects ranked the Faculty's civil engineering program 29th in the world, and metallurgical engineering, computer science and engineering, and transportation science and technology programs within the top 75 around the globe. Also rated within the top 101-150 programs in the world were the Faculty's water resources and telecommunication engineering disciplines.

=== Deans of Engineering ===
Dean	Years served
Heather Sheardown	2022-
Ishwar K. Puri	2013-2021
David S. Wilkinson	2008-2012
Mo Elbestawi	2001-2007
Mamdouh Shoukri	1994-2001
Gary R. Purdy	1989-1994
Arthur C. Heidebrecht	1981-1989
John W. Bandler	1979-1981
Leslie W. Shemilt	1969-1979
John W. Hodgins	1958-1969

== Research ==
=== Research Institutes ===
- McMaster Steel Research Centre
- Brockhouse Institute for Materials Research
- Centre for Emerging Device Technologies (CEDT)
- McMaster Institute for Multi-Hazard Systemic Risk Studies (INTERFACE)
- McMaster Manufacturing Research Institute (MMRI)
- McMaster Centre for Software Certification (McSCert)
- General Motors Centre for Automotive Materials & Corrosion (CAMC)
- McMaster Advanced Control Consortium (MACC)
- Centre for Research in Macro- and Nano-Systems
- Centre for Mechatronics and Hybrid Technologies
- Centre for Advanced Polymer Process & Design
- McMaster Institute for Energy Studies (MIES)
- McMaster University Centre for Effective Design of Structures

=== Research Chairs ===
==== Canada Research Chair ====
Name	Title	Discipline	Lab
Todd Hoare	Engineered Smart Materials		
Heather Sheardown	Canada Research Chair in Ophthalmic Biomaterials and Drug Delivery Systems		
Leyla Soleymani	Miniaturized Biomedical Devices		
==== NSERC Industrial Chairs ====
Saeid Habibi	NSERC/Ford Chair in Hybrid Technologies	Automotive engineering	
Thia (Kiruba) Kirubarajan	NSERC/General Dynamics Mission Systems-Canada Industrial Research Chair in Target Tracking and Information Fusion	Fusion	Estimation, Tracking and Fusion Research Laboratory
Joseph McDermid	NSERC/Stelco Inc. Industrial Research Chair in Advanced Coated Steels	Materials science	
Dave Novog	NSERC-UNENE Industrial Research Chair	Nuclear engineering	
Ali Emadi	Canada Excellence Research Chair in Hybrid Powertrain	Automotive engineering	
==== Endowed Chairs ====
Cameron Churchill	Don Pether Chair in Engineering and Management		
Peter Mascher	W. Sinclair Chair in Optoelectronics		
Andre Phillion	ArcelorMittal Dofasco Chair in Ferrous Metallurgy		
Saiedeh Razavi	Chair in Heavy Construction		
Shahram Shirani	L.R. Wilson/BCE Chair in Data Communications		
Michael Tait	Joe Ng/JNE Consulting Chair in Design, Construction, and Management of Infrastructure Renewal		
Stephen Veldhuis	Braley-Orlick Chair in Advanced Manufacturing	Manufacturing	McMaster Manufacturing Research Institute

== Student life ==
The Faculty of Engineering at McMaster is known for its active student life. The McMaster Engineering Society (MES) offers an Engineering Co-op and Career Services (ECCS), which is a joint venture with the Faculty of Engineering. Engineering Co-op & Career Services connects students with employers, provides career-planning tools and resources, and provides opportunities for students to gain employment experience.

Some student-led groups within the faculty include: McMaster Ecocar 3, McMaster Formula Electric, Engineers Without Borders, McMaster Engineering Musical, McMaster Baja Racing and the McMaster Solar Car Team.

=== Traditions ===
Engineering students at McMaster University can purchase leather jackets with their faculty and graduation date embroidered on the arms and back of the coat. Since this tradition was established, these jackets have become a distinctive characteristic of McMaster Engineering on campus.

Student representatives to the faculty are chosen each year to lead the upcoming first years and represent the faculty of engineering at events. They typically dress in a red jumpsuit which they often personalize throughout their stay at McMaster Engineering. These representatives, nicknamed "Redsuits" or "Reds" are a fixture on campus and are known for their spirited behaviors'. The Redsuits have become synonymous with McMaster Engineering as well as McMaster University.

McMaster Fireball

Undergraduate students produce an annual Engineering Musical every March that is written and directed by engineering students, with all of the 20-30 member cast and 10-15 member crew consisting of engineers. The musical takes a well known play, theme, or story and uses it as inspiration, but with a new script that includes jokes about professors, courses, faculty, and "arties".

=== The fireball ===
The fireball is the official symbol of McMaster Engineering. It historically comes from the coat of arms of Hamilton College. McMaster's Faculty of Engineering emerged from Hamilton College in 1958 and hence adopted a red fireball as its own emblem in 1960. The fireball symbol is used widely by both the faculty and students to represent everything from culture, to excellence in research and innovation, as well as the energy that cuts across science and engineering. In 2016, the Engineering Student Society of Conestoga College in Kitchener, Ontario applied to make the fireball a registered trademark. The application was withdrawn in 2017.

== Facilities ==
The faculty's facilities include:

- John Hodgins Engineering Building, which with 240,677 sq/ft (22,360 sq/m) is the major teaching, research, outreach and administrative hub on campus for the McMaster University Faculty of Engineering.
- Information Technology Building – 82,000-square-foot (7,600 m^{2}) building, home to the Department of Computing and Software and the Department of Electrical and Computer Engineering.
- Communications Research Laboratory
- Applied Dynamics Laboratory – research lab for Department of Civil Engineering
- Thode Library of Science and Engineering
- Nuclear Research Building, McMaster Nuclear Reactor
- McMaster Manufacturing Research Institute – 10,000-square-foot (930 m^{2}) addition to the Engineering Building
- Engineering Technology Building - 125,000-square-foot (11,600 m^{2}) building houses the Walter G. Booth School of Engineering Practice and Technology and School of Biomedical Engineering
- Gerald Hatch Centre for Engineering Experiential Learning (Anticipated Occupancy – Start 2017)

=== Canadian Centre for Electron Microscopy ===
The Canadian Centre for Electron Microscopy at McMaster is home to the world's most advanced microscope. The titan 80-300 cubed microscope has a magnification of 14 million and is used for material, medical and nano-research.

== Iron Ring Clock ==
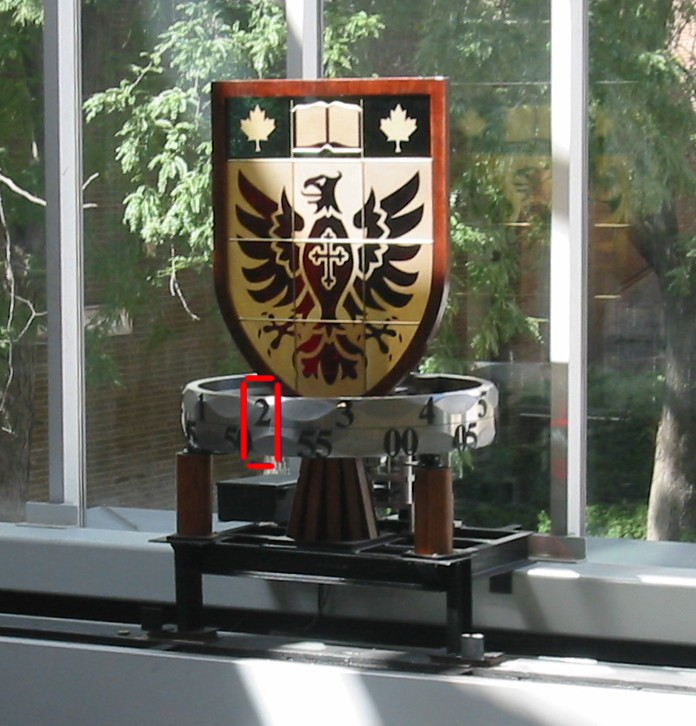
The Iron Ring clock, with the correct time highlighted by the red box. The time is 2:52pm.

The Iron Ring Clock is a clock of unusual design, based on the Iron Ring received by Canadian engineers during the Ritual of the Calling of an Engineer. It was designed and built as a thesis project by four Mechanical Engineering students: Patrick Burton, Braden Kurczak, Michael Paddags, and Peter Whitred. It won the 2nd prize for Manufacturing at the 2003 Canadian Society for Mechanical Engineering Student Design Competition. The clock was donated to the University in September 2003, at which time it was also put into commission.

The clock was designed in large part in a four-month period at the end of 2002, with some features that were originally intended for an outdoor installation. The clock keeps time through the use of a synchronous alternating current motor, which regulates its speed based on the frequency of the electricity that it is fed. The top and bottom halves of the ring rotate independently, with the top half of the ring displaying the hours, and the bottom half the minutes. The minute ring moves constantly, while the hour ring increments once an hour through the use of a Geneva drive mechanism. The rings are driven through a gearbox that was designed and partly manufactured by the group. The two ring sections are made of forged stainless steel, with machined surfaces, and facets cut using a robotic six-axis water jet cutter. The central shield, which is the university coat of arms, is made of hand-crafted stained glass. The design of the clock was completed entirely with computer-aided design software, and CNC tools were used for components where the most precision was required. Although the clock was donated to McMaster University on completion, it is maintained by members of the team that built it.

To minimise costs, the team with help from technicians manufactured as many components as possible in an on-campus machine shop. The total cost of the clock was approximately $20,000 CAD, which was raised through donations, with donors listed on a nearby plaque.

=== Issues and lifetime wear ===
A six-spoke external Geneva wheel in motion. The mechanism in the Iron Ring Clock is a four-spoke Geneva wheel.

While it is quite well known on campus, the Iron Ring Clock is not always recognized as a clock. The most common criticism of the clock is that it is counterintuitive to read. (It must be read straight on, with the number on the top ring denoting the hour and the number on the bottom ring denoting the minute. If there is no number directly under the hour indicator, the minute must be inferred from the nearest two numbers.) As the rings move slowly, the clock has been mistaken for a static display. It has shown the wrong time in the past, due to events such as power outages or breakdowns; in 2006/2007, the clock stopped for three months due to motor bearing failure. In 2007, an uninterruptible power supply was installed to eliminate the problem with power outages. However, in the absence of such events the motor and mechanism have shown themselves to be quite accurate.

The clock has also had issues with mechanical wear; the use of steel ball bearings to support and position the rings has led to grooves being worn into the rings themselves, as the bearings are hardened steel and the rings are not. Some of these bearings have been replaced, as it becomes necessary; the group is considering future solutions to this problem. Other portions of the gear train are mounted on bronze bearings; these are expected to have a shorter wear life and will likely have to be replaced sooner than other gearbox components.

The Geneva wheel, made of aluminum for ease of manufacture, has also experienced some wear and will eventually need to be remade (the mechanism used in the clock differs slightly from the one shown in the graphic as it has only four spokes).
