= Daniel Szor =

American distiller (born 1962)

- Born: September 1962 (age 63); New York City
- Citizenship: United States, United Kingdom
- Occupation: Distiller
- Employers: Cotswolds Distillery; Worshipful Company of Distillers; English Whisky Guild

Daniel Szor (born 1962) is an American-British entrepreneur and distiller. He is known as the founder of the Cotswolds Distillery, producers of English single malt whisky and craft spirits. Prior to his career in distilling, Szor spent more than two decades in the international foreign exchange investment management industry, including senior roles at FX Concepts. He has also held a number of leadership and public appointment roles within the UK spirits industry and related public bodies.

== Early life and education ==
Szor was born in New York City in 1962. He was educated in the United States before beginning a career in international finance.

== Career ==
=== Foreign exchange career ===
==== FX Concepts ====
Szor spent over 25 years working in the foreign exchange (FX) investment management industry. In 1987, he joined FX Concepts, a New York-based currency investment management firm founded by John Taylor, which became one of the largest specialist FX managers globally.

Early in his career at FX Concepts, Szor worked in research and client advisory roles focused on foreign exchange and interest-rate markets. In 1993, he was responsible for opening the firm’s first European office in Paris, reflecting the growing importance of European institutional investors in currency management. He subsequently focused on developing the firm’s European institutional client base and its advisory and overlay businesses.

By the late 1990s and early 2000s, Szor was described in industry and pensions trade press as head of European marketing at FX Concepts, and was frequently quoted on currency overlay strategies, risk management and euro-denominated investment products. He later became a managing director of the firm and was associated with the expansion of FX Concepts’ European operations, including the establishment of a London office.

UK corporate records list Szor as a director of FX Concepts’ UK entities during the period of the firm’s London operations. He left FX Concepts in 2013, after which he began transitioning away from finance.

=== Cotswolds Distillery ===
In 2014, Szor founded the Cotswolds Distillery in Stourton located within the Cotswolds Area of Outstanding Natural Beauty. The distillery was established to produce premium small-batch spirits, including gin and single malt whisky, using locally sourced ingredients.

The distillery released its first whisky following the required maturation period and has since become one of the best-known producers within the emerging English whisky category. Under Szor’s leadership, the business expanded both domestically and internationally, and has been widely cited in industry and business press as a contributor to the revival and global recognition of English whisky.

== Appointments ==
In addition to his role at the Cotswolds Distillery, Szor has held a number of leadership, governance and public service positions. He has served as a board member of the Wine & Spirit Trade Association (WSTA), the principal trade association representing the UK wine and spirits industry. He has also served as a board member of the Gin Guild, the historic membership body promoting excellence and education in gin distilling.

In 2017, Szor was appointed as a Secretary of State–appointed member of the Cotswolds Conservation Board, the statutory body responsible for conserving and enhancing the Cotswolds Area of Outstanding Natural Beauty.

On November 21, 2025 Szor was appointed as the 378th Master of the Worshipful Company of Distillers. one of the City of London’s historic livery companies, in recognition of his contribution to the British spirits industry.

== Publications ==
Szor is the author of Spirit Guide: In Search of an Authentic Life (2020), an autobiographical work describing his career in international finance, his move to rural England, and the founding of the Cotswolds Distillery.
