= Paul Santerre =

Canadian engineer

- Born: 1960 (age 65–66); New Brunswick, Canada
- Awards: Governor General's Innovation Award

Academic background
- Education: BA, Dalhousie University; MSc, University of New Brunswick; PhD, chemical engineering, 1990, McMaster University
- Thesis: Sulfonated and derivatized sulfonated polyurethanes for blood contacting applications (1991)
- Doctoral advisor: John Brash

Academic work
- Institutions: Interface Biologics Inc. University of Toronto; University Health Network; University of Ottawa Heart Institute
- Website: www.santerrelab.com/paul-santerre

Joseph Paul Patrice-Guy Santerre FCAHS (born 1960) is a Canadian engineer. He is a Full Professor at the University of Toronto and holds the Baxter Chair in Health Technology and Commercialization.

== Early life and education ==
Santerre was born in 1960 to parents Roger and Bernadette Santerre. He graduated from Polyvalente Roland-Pépin before enrolling at Dalhousie University for his undergraduate studies. Santerre became interested in studying applied science after working on oil sands surfactants in Alberta in 1982. He then earned his Master's degree in classical polymer chemistry at University of New Brunswick and his PhD at McMaster University. While he originally intended to study under Archie Hamielec, Santerre developed a strong working relationship with chemical engineer professor John Brash.

== Career ==
After earning his PhD in chemical engineering, Santerre joined the University of Ottawa Heart Institute as the lead materials engineer for their artificial heart program. He left Ottawa in 1993 to become a professor of biomaterials at the University of Toronto (U of T). Early into his tenure at U of T, Santerre developed technologies to program biocompatibility directly into the raw plastic resins, which in turn made device manufacturing more cost-effective. U of T's Innovations and Partnerships Office invested in Santerre's research and helped create the strart-up Interface Biologics Inc. (IBI) to improve the safety and effectiveness of medical devices. Through IBI, Santerre helped produce technologies to make biomaterials more compatible with the human body. One of the first technologies that IBI began producing from Santerre's laboratory was Endex, a surface modifying macromolecule that helps reduce the incidence of clotting. In 2011, Fresenius Medical Care began applying IBI's Endexo technology to dialysis circuits for treating end-stage renal disease. They then adapted Endex into Kinesyx, which helps heal diseased tissue, and Epidel, which helps deliver drugs that proactively protect bodies against infections.

Santerre became a core faculty member at U of T's Institute of Biomaterials and Biomedical Engineering in 1999 and served as the associate dean of research in the University of Toronto Faculty of Dentistry from 2003 to 2008. Due to his increasing responsibilities, Santerre stepped down as President of IBI in 2004 but remained on as their Chief Scientific Officer. Santerre was elected a Fellow of the American Institute for Medical and Biological Engineering in 2009 for "pioneering contributions to the science and practice of biomaterial degradation and surface modification." He was also elected a Fellow of the American Association for the Advancement of Science and received the 2010 Julia Levy Award for successful commercialisation of innovation in Canada from the Society of Chemical Industry.

Santerre's work with IBI earned him the 2012 Natural Sciences and Engineering Research Council of Canada (NSERC) Synergy Award for Innovation. The award specifically recognized his development of Endexo, Kinesyx, and Epidel. The following year, Santerre was elected a Fellow of the Canadian Academy of Health Sciences. In 2014, Santerre established the Health Innovation Hub (H2i) to help grow other entrepreneurial ventures. He also received a Ernest C. Manning Innovation Award for his work reducing blood clots caused by medical devices in patients.

In February 2018, Santerre was named the Baxter Chair of Health Technology and Commercialization by the University Health Network. Shortly after accepting this new role, Santerre and IBI sold its Endexo surface modification business to Evonik Industries in order to focus more on their Epidel drug delivery platform. In 2020, Santerre received the Lifetime Achievement Award from the Canadian Biomaterials Society.

== Personal life ==
Santerre and his wife Shelley Cosman have two children together. In honour of his late brother, Santerre gives each of his PhD students a copy of The Alchemist by Paulo Coelho.
