= Shemilt =

Shemilt is a surname. Notable people with the surname include:

- David Shemilt (born 1964), Canadian swimmer
- Elaine Shemilt (born 1954), Scottish artist and researcher
- Leslie Shemilt (1919–2011), Canadian chemical engineer and academic
