= John Brash =

John Brash may refer to:

- John Brash (chemical engineer) (born 1937), Canadian chemical engineer
- John Brash (rugby union) (1939–2007), Scottish international rugby union player
