= Sheardown =

Sheardown is a surname. Notable people with the surname include:

- Heather Sheardown, Canadian engineer
- John Sheardown (1924–2012), Canadian diplomat
- Percy Sheardown (1911–1993), Canadian bridge player
- Zena Sheardown, Guayanese-Canadian woman
