= English Whisky Guild =

Trade association for English whisky

- Abbreviation: EWG
- Formation: (active: 18 May 2022; 4 years ago)
- Type: Membership organisation
- Legal status: Non profit organisation (Limited Company)
- Purpose: Promote and protect English Whisky
- Headquarters: Registered Office; 17 Walkergate, Berwick Upon Tweed, TD15 1DJ
- Origins: England
- Products: English whisky
- Members: Members; 27 (50 distilleries) (Note: The English whisky Guild features on page 65); Associate members 12 (Note: The EWG is split into two tiers EWG members and associate members); Board members 14
- CEO: Morag Garden
- Chairman: Tagore Ramoutar
- Vice Chair: Eddie Large
- Affiliations: British Distillers Alliance
- Website: www.englishwhiskyguild.com

The English Whisky Guild (EWG) is a membership organisation that promotes and protects English whisky.

== Purpose and ambition ==
=== Purpose ===
The purpose of the English Whisky Guild is to promote and protect English Whisky including its diversity and flavour, offer support to producers and consumers and ensure high standards for English whisky across the industry in England

=== Ambition ===
The English Whisky Guild have stated that their primary ambition is to get English whisky recognised globally as a respected choice for whisky drinkers.

== Leadership ==
Andrew Nelstrop was appointed as the first chair of the EWG on 18 May 2022, He was succeeded by Daniel Szor in October 2023, and Tagore Ramoutar was appointed chair on 13 October 2026 with Eddie Large appointed as vice chair on that date. On 24 April 2023 the guild appointed its first chief executive officer, Morag Garden.

The EWG has a board of 12 directors which as of 2026 includes Andrew Nelstrop, Leon Szor, Stephan Russel, Tagore Ramoutar, Thomas Mellor, Maxwell Vaughan, Alan Ferguson, Sebastian Heeley, Alasdair Large, Alexander Wolpert, Bruce Smith and Christopher Pateman.

== Membership ==
The English Whisky Guild was incorporated as a limited company on 18 May 2022 with 15 founding members including Adnams Plc (Copper House), Cooper King Distillery, Ad Gefrin Distillery, Cotswolds distillery, East London Liquor Co, Henstone Distillery, Spirit of Yorkshire Distillery, The English Distillery, The Lakes Distillery, Fielden, Wharf Distillery, White Peak Distillery and Whittaker's Distillery.

As of 23 April 2023 The English Whisky Guild consisted of 26 members and includes Ellers Farm Distillery, Elsham Wold Distillery, Grasmere Distillery, Lancaster Spirits Co, Ludlow Distillery, Retribution Distilling Co, Spirit of the Downs, Spirit of Manchester Distillery, Ten Hides Distillery, Trevethan Distillery, Wight Whisky, West Midlands Distillery and Witchmark Distillery.

The English Whisky Guild also has 12 associate members and includes Briggs of Burton, Catalyst Bottle ERP, Close Brothers, Contagious, Crisp Malt, Forsyths, Howden, Lallemand, Masthouse, Simpson Malt Ltd, Rankins Brothers and Sons, Urban Bar.

The first meeting of the English Whisky Guild was on 18 June 2021.

=== Former Members ===
• Halewood Artisan Spirits

• Yarm Distillery

When the English Whisky Guild applied to DEFRA for a Geographical Indication, Circumstance Distillery felt the Geographical Indication (as submitted in February 2022) would act as a barrier to entry for new distilleries and discourage innovation within the industry. After failing to convince the Guild to alter the application Circumstance Distillery left the organisation in March 2022.

== Recognition ==
In February 2022, the English Whisky Guild applied for a geographical Indication to put into law the definition of English Whisky.

In February 2025, the English whisky geographical indication entered the consultation phase.

On 12 September 2026 the English Whisky GI application was accepted with registration occurring on 1 October 2026.

== Annual report ==
On 14 June 2024 the English Whisky Guild released its first annual report outlining the progress that English whisky has made and the unique tapestry of distilleries. The report covers a various numbers of areas including statistical analysis of English whisky, interviews with whisky produces, profiles of whisky distilleries and associate members and think pieces that cover the process of the English whisky geographical indication.

== English whisky week ==
On 11 April 2025 the English Whisky Guild launched the inaugural English whisky week. The event is hosted by the and takes place from the 19–27 April. It brings together distillers and help to educate the public about English whisky and includes whisky tasting, masterclasses, distillery tours, exclusive events and community engagements.

== See also ==
=== Wiki Links ===
- English single malt

=== External links ===
Geographical Indication

- English Whisky GI
- SWA statement on the English whisky GI English whisky GI (press release)
- English whisky GI (DEFRA notice)

EWG Reports

- 1st Annual Report
