= High Performance Computing Virtual Laboratory =

- Abbreviation: HPCVL
- Formation: 1998
- Type: Consortium
- Purpose: High Performance Research Computing
- Headquarters: Queen's University in Kingston
- Location: Kingston, Ottawa, Toronto, Belleville
- Region served: Ontario
- Executive Director: Ken Edgecombe
- Staff: 14
- Website: http://hpcvl.org

HPCVL is the High Performance Computing Virtual Laboratory, a consortium of 5 universities and 3 colleges providing high performance computing to researchers at these institutions and across Canada. They include Queen's University, Royal Military College of Canada, University of Ottawa, Carleton University, Toronto Metropolitan University, Loyalist College, St. Lawrence College, and Seneca College.

HPCVL is a member of Compute Canada, a national platform for dynamic resources, and includes the following consortia:

- CLUMEQ
- SHARCNET
- WestGrid
- SCinet
- ACEnet
