= Association of Small Direct Wine Merchants =

ASDW logo

The Association of Small Direct Wine Merchants (ASDW) is a United Kingdom non-profit trade association that was founded in 2003 to assist United Kingdom small wine merchants. ASDW typically aides importers, to support members in their fight against measures in the United Kingdom Licensing Act 2003. It has around 24 members. The ASDW is affiliated to the Wine and Spirit Trade Association and members of ASDW are also members of the WSTA. ASDW publishes GrapesTALK, an online free wine magazine.

== History ==
The ASDW was formed by a group of British independent small wine merchants directly selling to the general public via mail order and the internet. It was originally formed as a lobby group by a group of six merchants with Warren Edwardes as initial Chairman Nick Dobson as initial Secretary, to fight what were seen by the founding members as injustices in the UK Licensing Act 2003, which acted against the interests of smaller wine merchants. ASDW has grown rapidly and evolved into a more broadly based organisation with wider aims and objectives.
