= The Lakes Distillery =

Distillery based in Cumbria, England

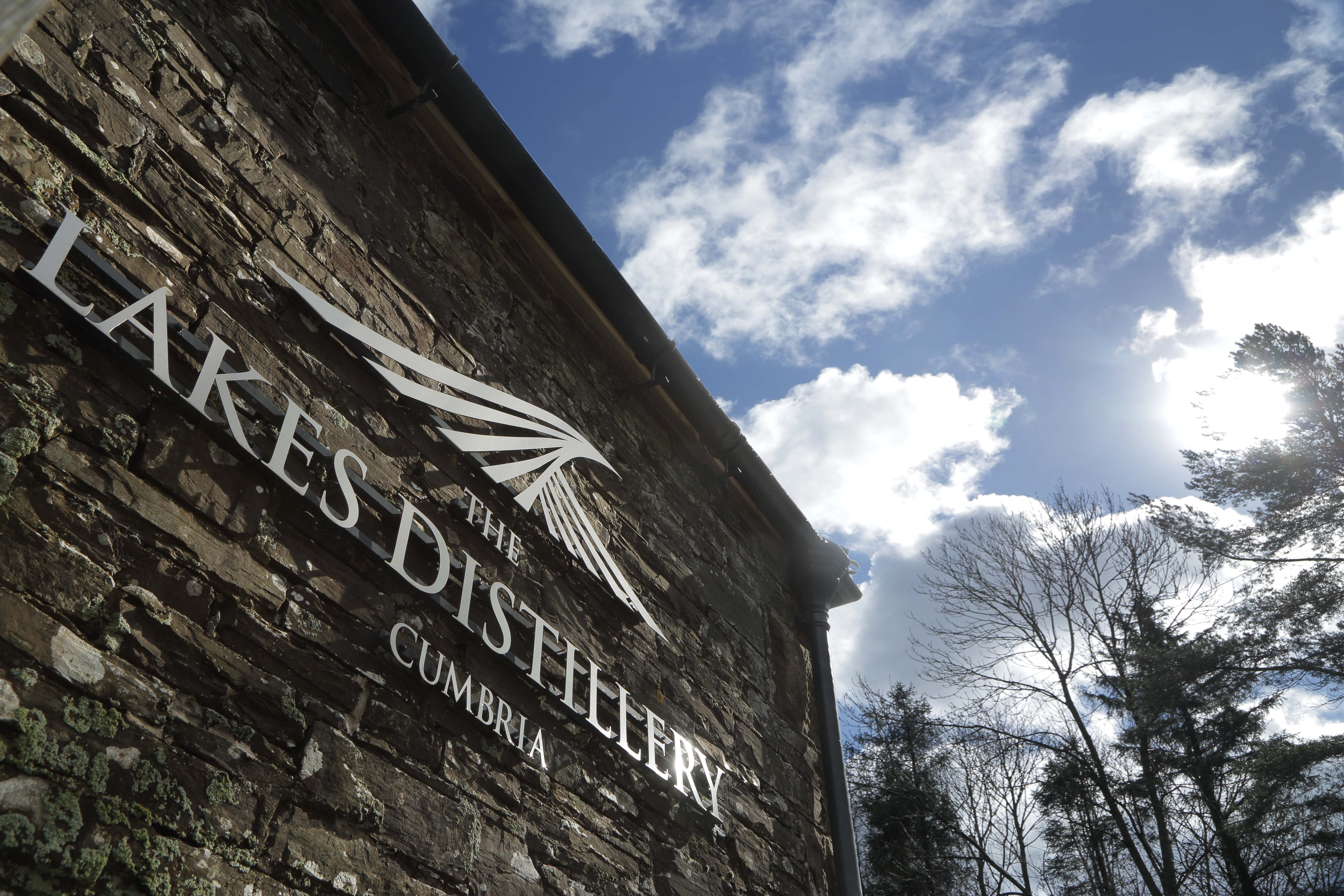
- Location: Bassenthwaite Lake, Cumbria
- Owner: Nyetimber
- Founded: 2014; 12 years ago
- Founder: Paul Currie
- Status: Operational
- Water source: River Derwent
- Capacity: 375,000 litres
- Website: lakesdistillery.com

Lakes
- Type: Gin, Vodka, Whisky

The Lakes Distillery is an English whisky, gin and vodka distillery in the Lake District, located near to Bassenthwaite Lake, Cumbria.

== History ==
The Lakes Distillery was established in 2014 by Paul Carrie on the site of a renovated 1850s farm. Currie had previously co-founded Lochranza distillery on the Isle of Arran, Scotland. A total of £9 million was invested in building the distillery.

On 7 January 2022 The Lakes Distillery announced plans to expand its distillery by installing 8 new washbacks.

In March 2024 James Pennefather was appointed chief executive. The following month, the English wine company Nyetimber made a bid to acquire the distillery for £71 million. The acquisition was finalised that June.

== Products ==
The distillery produce both single malt and blended whisky. The distillery's inaugural single malt release, called Genesis, was auctioned via the website Whisky Auctioneer in 2018. The first bottle was sold for £7900. Only 99 bottles were made. The first core range whisky, Signature, was released in March 2025.

In 2018 the Lakes Distillery created an combined English-Scottish blended whisky. Other whisky bottlings from the distillery include Infinity, Iris, and the Reserve series.

The distillery's gins include a London Dry Gin and Pink Grapefruit Gin They have also released gin crackers and an elderflower gin liqueur.

== Reception and awards ==
In 2022 the distillery's Whiskymaker’s Reserve No.4 was named the world’s best single malt at the World Whisky Awards.

== See also ==
- List of whisky distilleries in England
- English whisky
- English Whisky Guild
