= Nahum Sonenberg =

Canadian microbiologist

- נחום סוננברג
- Born: December 29, 1946 (age 79); Wetzlar, Germany
- Education: Tel-Aviv University; Weizmann Institute of Science
- Known for: Translational Control
- Awards: Gairdner Foundation International Award (2008); Robert L. Noble Prize; Wolf Prize
- Scientific career
- Fields: Biochemistry
- Workplaces: The Rosalind and Morris Goodman Cancer Research Centre; McGill University

Nahum Sonenberg, OC FRS FRSC (Hebrew: נחום סוננברג; born December 29, 1946) is an Israeli Canadian microbiologist and biochemist. He is a James McGill professor of biochemistry at McGill University in Montreal, Quebec, Canada. He was an HHMI international research scholar from 1997 to 2011 and is now a senior international research scholar.

== Education ==
Sonenberg was born in a camp for displaced persons in Wetzlar, Germany and grew up in Israel. He received a B.Sc. and M.Sc. in microbiology and immunology from Tel Aviv University and his Ph.D. in biochemistry from the Weizmann Institute of Science in 1976. He later held a Chaim Weizmann postdoctoral fellowship at the Roche Institute of Molecular Biology. He joined McGill University in 1979.

== Research ==
Sonenberg's primary research has been on the translational control of protein synthesis. Sonenberg also discovered the Internal ribosome entry site (IRES) mode of translation, the cap-independent initiation of translation, which is critical for some mRNA involved in stress, cell cycling and apoptosis. Currently, he has expanded his research into topics such as the roles of translation in neurobiology and synaptic plasticity. Presently, his lab works on translational control in cancer, oncolytic viruses as anti-cancer drugs, microRNA control of translation, and translational control of plasticity, learning and memory. He received the Gairdner Foundation International Award in 2008 for his contributions to medical science. He was appointed an Officer of the Order of Canada in 2010.

In 2014, Sonenberg was awarded the Wolf Prize in Medicine.

== Awards and recognition ==
- Recipient of the Robert L. Noble Prize from the National Cancer Institute of Canada in 2002
- Recipient of the Isaak-Walton-Killam Award for Health Sciences in 2005
- Elected a Fellow of the Royal Society in 2006
- Recipient of the Gairdner Foundation International Award in 2008
- Appointed as an Officer of the Order of Canada in 2010
- Recipient of the Lewis S. Rosenstiel Award in 2011
- Named Fellow of the American Association for the Advancement of Science in 2012
- Recipient of the Royal Society of Canada McLaughlin Medal in 2013
- Recipient of the Wolf Prize in 2014
- Elected Foreign Associate, US National Academy of Sciences in 2015
