= Election Working Group =

The Election Working Group (EWG) is a non-partisan, 32-member network of civil society organizations. Established in 2006, EWG members share a common commitment to free and fair elections and good governance in Bangladesh.

The guiding objectives of the EWG are:

1. To support free and fair elections through pre-election, election day, and post-election observation 2. To conduct voter and civic education in key thematic areas that encourage the full participation of all segments of society in the electoral process 3. To promote electoral reform through public dialogue and advocacy

The National Secretariat of the EWG, headed by a Director, coordinates the day-to-day activities of the EWG on behalf of its members, with oversight from an elected Executive Committee.

Through its wide and varied membership, the EWG has outreach down to the village level throughout Bangladesh, making it an effective network through which to deliver voter information materials and to recruit both stationary and mobile election observers.

A national network, but international in reach, EWG members have participated in election observation missions in various countries, including Thailand and the Philippines.

== EWG Programs ==
The EWG has implemented several programs since its establishment. These include:

Preparation for the 2006 elections: the EWG planned to implement voter education and election observation activities for the cancelled January 2007. Using a multi-tier program delivery mechanism, the network had outreach to the sub-union level. By early January 2007, when the EWG pre-election program activities were suspended on the basis of a consensus decision of all members, the EWG secretariat and member organizations had recruited and trained 64 district coordinators, over 500 sub-district or thana coordinators, and more than 5,000 union coordinators to implement field activities. Over 165,000 stationary and mobile observers were prepared to act as election day observers.

EWG monthly public perception studies: Since February 2007, the EWG has conducted monthly national public perception studies on the political and economic environment under the state of emergency. The studies probe key aspects of public opinion such as citizen concerns about current policies, confidence in the Caretaker Government, perceptions of the economy, views on anti-corruption activities, and overall appraisal of current circumstances as compared to those under the past elected government.

EWG support for the national voter registration process: Between August 2007 and August 2008 the EWG conducted a nationwide program of voter education designed to motivate eligible voters to complete registration for the milestone national electoral roll with photographs. This was carried out through a cooperative working relationship with the Bangladesh Election Commission. The EWG campaign had a strong focus on historically difficult to reach segments of the population including women, ethnic and religious minorities, disabled persons, and residents of geographically remote areas.

EWG city corporation election activities: the EWG was actively engaged in the August 4, 2008 city corporation and pourashava elections with a program consisting of election observation and voter education activities. The local government elections provided an opportunity to test coordinating mechanisms and program delivery and other systems and procedures that EWG will utilize on a larger scale in the upcoming national parliamentary and upazila elections.

2008 national parliamentary elections: the EWG has developed a comprehensive voter education and election observation plan for the 2008 election. Voter education activities will emphasize: creating a knowledgeable electorate; the need to vote for candidates with clear policies; and citizen demand for greater accountability of elected representatives. These themes are evident in its array of public service announcements for television and radio broadcast, brochures, posters, and other printed materials, and locally organized activities such as town hall meetings and candidate debates. While voter education is designed to strengthen the content of the elections, EWG has a comprehensive election observation plan in which observers will be deployed to all polling booths throughout Bangladesh.

== EWG Funding ==
As a coalition of established organizations, the EWG serves as a cost-efficient mechanism for implementing election-related programs nationwide. All member organizations devote staff time and resources. Importantly, they can be mobilized in a short period of time to deliver programs. Since 2006, the EWG has received financial support and technical assistance from The Asia Foundation. The EWG is grateful for the generous financial support of the Australian Agency for International Development (AusAID), the Canadian International Development Agency (CIDA), the United Kingdom Department for International Development (DFID), the Royal Danish Embassy, the Royal Norwegian Embassy, the Swedish International Development Assistance (Sida), the Swiss Development Corporation, and the Embassy of the Kingdom of the Netherlands.

== Sources ==
- EWG National Secretariat office Bangladesh
- The Asia Foundation(TAF) Bangladesh
