= Ad Gefrin Distillery =

English distillery

Coordinates: 55.545159°N 2.01103°W

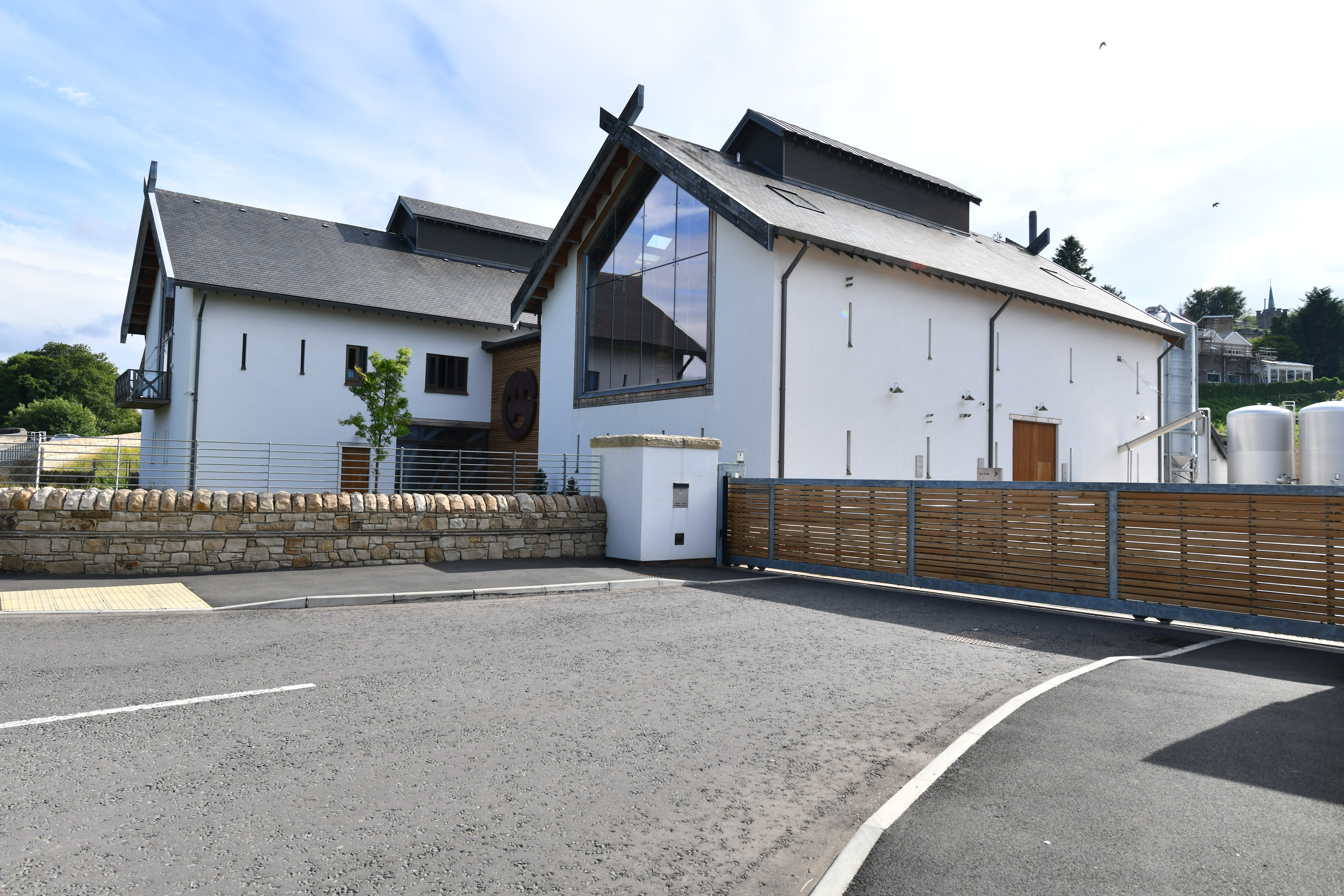
- Type: Distillery
- Industry: Beverages
- Founded: 2023
- Founder: Eileen Ferguson; Alan Ferguson
- Headquarters: Northumberland, England
- Products: Distilled beverages: English whisky; Gin
- Website: https://adgefrin.co.uk/

The Ad Gefrin Distillery is a distillery in Wooler, Northumberland, England.

== History ==
On 25 March 2023 the Ad Gefrin distillery was opened officially by Eileen and Alan Ferguson.

== Design ==
The design of Ad Gefrin was inspired by a seventh-century palace owned by King Edwin of Northumbria that is situated at the base of Yeavering Bell. The name of Yeavering is first attested in Bede's Ecclesiastical History of the English People of 731, where it has the form ad gefrin. This originated in the Brittonic words gevr 'goats' and brïnn 'hill'; thus, the name meant 'hill of the goats'.

== Releases ==
On 27 October 2022 Ad Gefrin Distillery debuted their inaugural whisky Tácnbora which is made with a combination of Scotch and Irish whiskies. There have been three releases of Tácnbora as a principal bottling as of late 2025, Batch 1, 2, & 3. A number of limited Cask Finishes of Tácnbora have also been released: Islay Finish (1629 bottles) 2023; Cognac Finish (1997 bottles) 2024; Sauternes Finish (1942 bottles) 2025. Two further blends are available only to members: Corenkyn Blend (three releases to 2025 of a planned four), and Corengyst Blend.

On 15 June 2023 the Ad Gefrin Distillery released their first ever gin called Thirlings Dry Gin which is made from a variety of botanicals including heather and pine from the Cheviot hills, elderberry and dill from the hedgerow, Irish moss and sea buckthorn from the Northumberland Coast. The gin is named after thegns who inhabited Thirlings. A whisky cream liqueur, Flýte, made from Tácnbora is also available.

On 26 July 2024 Ad Gefrin Distillery released three new whisky casks Ex-Sauternes (£6,000), Ex-Amarone (£5,750) and Ex-Cognac (£5,500), each of them are 225 litre Barrique and have been matured since 2022.

On 1st August 2026 the first Northumbrian Single Malt was released as the Craeft Series. There were three single casks released, each paired with a North East Artist for the label and it sold out within four hours.

== Achievements ==
On 15 June 2024 the Ad Gefrin distillery won two medals for its Tácnbora Northumbrian Blended Whisky (Silver), Corenkyn Blended Malt Whisky (Bronze) and Thirlings Gin (Bronze Medal) at the 2024 IWSC Awards.

In 2025 Ad Gefrin won Gold New Tourism Business of the Year at Visit England Awards for Excellence and in 2026 won Silver for Small Visitor Attraction of the Year.

In total it has was over 26 awards since opening.
