= ACEnet =

ACENET
- Abbreviation: ACENET
- Formation: 2004
- Type: Consortium
- Legal status: ACENET Solutions Inc., federally incorporated not-for-profit
- Purpose: High Performance Research Computing
- Headquarters: Memorial University of Newfoundland
- Region served: Atlantic Canada
- Members: 14
- Chief Executive Officer: Greg Lukeman
- Staff: 23
- Website: http://www.ace-net.ca

ACEnet or the Atlantic Computational Excellence Network is a partnership of fourteen Atlantic Canada institutions to organize themselves into a large scale high-performance computing (HPC) facilities for research. The nine institutions include; Memorial University of Newfoundland, University of New Brunswick, Mount Allison University, Dalhousie University, St. Francis Xavier University, Saint Mary's University and the University of Prince Edward Island, Cape Breton University, Mount St. Vincent University and Acadia University.

Established in 2003 as a shared service to provide advanced computing support and services to the Atlantic Canadian research community, ACENET was initially a consortium of five universities. Since then, its membership has grown and so has its mission. ACENET has 14 Atlantic university and community college members, and provides access to advanced computing infrastructure, technical support, and digital skills development to academic researchers and their students at any post-secondary institution in the region, as well as government departments and industry.

Publicly funded through the federal and provincial governments, it provides these services at no charge to researchers and students. Through its federally incorporated not-for-profit, ACENET Solutions Inc., it serves government departments and industry in the region on a cost-recovery basis. It is the only organization in Atlantic Canada providing these resources, expertise, support and training with the depth of scientific and technical expertise demanded by researchers and industry. ACENET currently support more than 300 projects totaling over 1000 users in Atlantic Canada.

ACENET connects users in the region to digital research infrastructure (DRI) resources across the country through its partnership with the national Digital Research Alliance of Canada (the Alliance) and the four other regional consortia - Calcul Quebec, Compute Ontario, DRI Prairies and DRI BC. The Alliance was created as a result of the federal government’s 2019 investment of $572M in a new Digital Research Infrastructure Strategy for Canada. It assumed the national responsibility for Advanced Research Computing (ARC) from Compute Canada on 1 April, 2022, with an expanded role that also includes Research Data Management (previously under the Portage Network) and Research Software (previously under the domain of CANARIE).

The Alliance and its five regional partners together comprise the Alliance Federation. Through the federation, ACENET represents regional needs and priorities at the national table.

== ACENET Members ==
The 14 member institutions include: Acadia University, Cape Breton University, College of the North Atlantic, Dalhousie University, Memorial University of Newfoundland, Mount Allison University, Mount St. Vincent University, New Brunswick Community College, Nova Scotia Community College, Nova Scotia College of Art & Design University, Saint Mary's University, St. Francis Xavier University, University of New Brunswick, and the University of Prince Edward Island.

== ACENET Compute Resources ==
ACENET currently has one regionally focused compute system, Siku.

== See also ==
- Grid computing
- High-performance technical computing
- Distributed computing
- Parallel computing
