= Cotswolds Distillery =

English distillery

The Cotswold Distillery
- Location: Stourton, Shipston-on-Stour, United Kingdom
- Owner: The Cotswold Distilling Company, Ltd.; Berry Bros (Note: Berry Bros did not disclose the exact terms of their investment)
- Founded: 2014
- Founder: Daniel Szor
- No. of stills: The distillery currently has four whisky stills, and two gin stills.
- Capacity: Whisky: 23,100 litres (Combined across four stills) Gin: 1,700 litres
- Website: www.cotswoldsdistillery.com

Cotswolds Distillery is an English distillery producing single malt whisky, gin and other spirits. It is located in Stourton, near Shipston-on-Stour, in the Cotswolds region of England. Founded in 2014, it was among the early producers of the modern English whisky revival and has since gained international recognition through industry awards and specialist retail distribution.

== History ==
The distillery was founded in 2014 by entrepreneur Daniel Szor, with the aim of producing premium English single malt whisky using traditional Scotch-style methods adapted to English ingredients and conditions.

Gin production began shortly after the distillery's establishment, allowing early commercial activity while whisky stocks matured. The first Cotswolds single malt whisky was released in 2017.

Between 2016 and 2020, the company undertook several crowdfunding rounds to support expansion, production capacity and maturing inventory. These rounds were among the most successful drinks-sector crowdfunding campaigns in the United Kingdom at the time. In June 2018, £3 million was raised on Crowdcube for a visitor centre. In January 2020, the company raised £1 million.

In 2021, Daisy Kerby-Smith, revealed that the distillery had, in fact, taken out one bottle from the first cask they filled. Selling it for £3,333 for charity. Making it one of the most expensive bottles of English Whisky to ever be sold.

In April 2023, Berry Bros. & Rudd acquired a minority stake in the business, a move widely reported in drinks-industry media as a strategic endorsement of the distillery and of English whisky more broadly.

From January 2024, Illva Saronno became the exclusive distributor of Cotswolds Distillery products in the United Kingdom and Benelux markets.

Since March 2025, The Cotswolds Distillery is the largest producer of English Whisky.

== Production ==
Cotswolds Distillery produces its spirits on site using copper pot stills. Whisky production involves long fermentations and double distillation, followed by maturation primarily in ex-bourbon casks and STR (shaved, toasted and re-charred) ex-wine casks.

Gin is distilled using separate copper pot stills and employs a “steep and boil” method, with a botanical recipe that includes juniper, coriander and locally inspired botanicals.

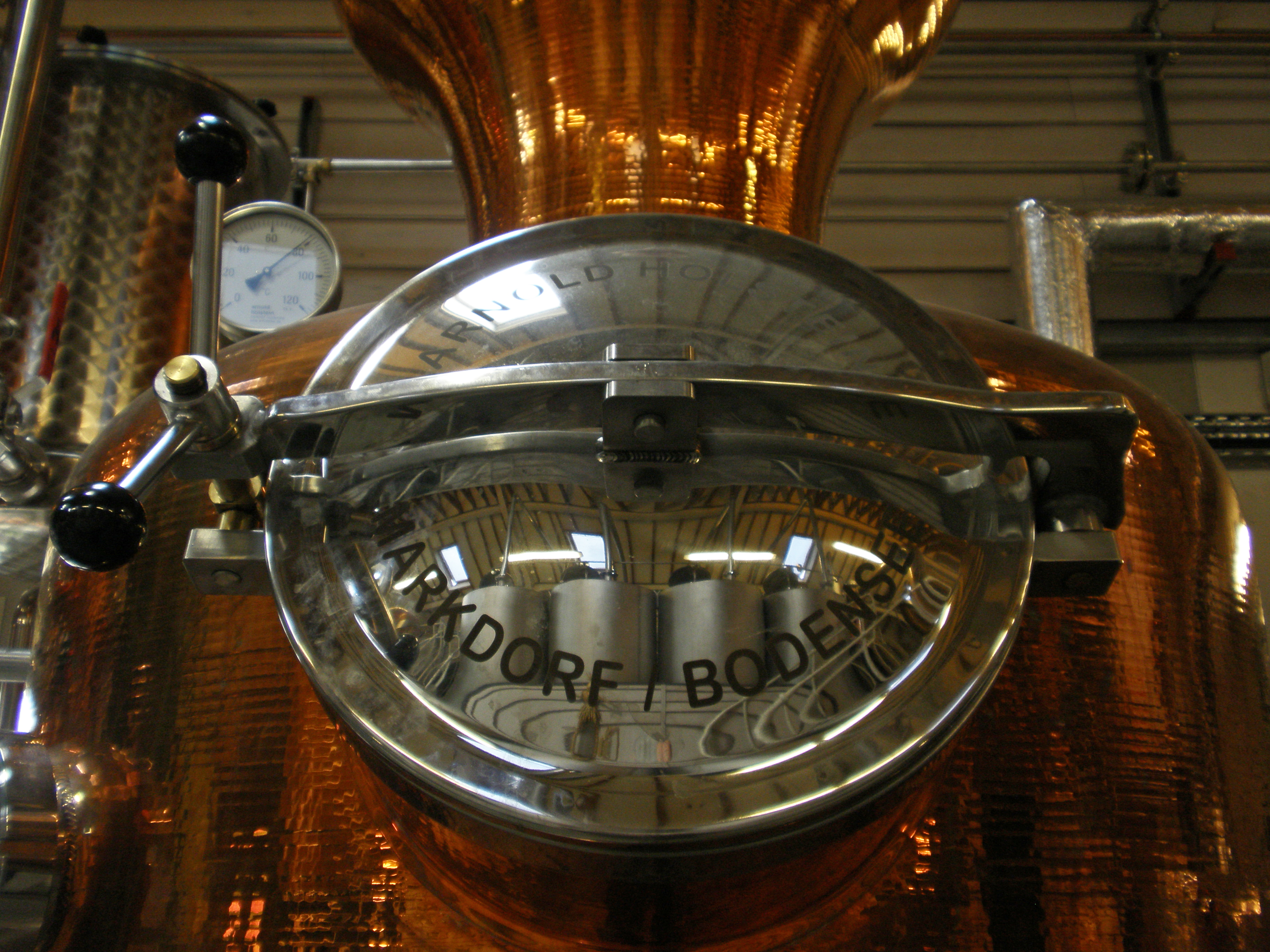
Apparatus

== Products ==
The distillery produces a range of whiskies, gins and liqueurs.

=== Whisky ===
- Cotswolds Signature Whisky (The distillery's flagship product)
- Cotswolds Core Whisky Range (Variation of Cask Expressions)
- Cotswolds Limited Releases (Hearts & Crafts, Harvest, Single Cask)

=== Gin ===
- Cotswolds Traditional Gin (Cotswolds Dry, Old Tom, Hedgerow (Sloe))
- Cotswolds Wildflower Series (1,2, and 3)
- Cotswolds Summer Cup (A Gin Sherry Liqueur Mix)
- Cotswolds Gin Essence (Low Alcohol)

=== Liqueur ===
- Cotswolds Cream Liqueur (Cream and Wheat Spirit)
- Cotswolds Amaro Liqueurs (1 and 2)

== Visitor centre ==
The distillery has multiple facilities on its site, including a shop, cafe and visitor centre. The distillery offers multiple experiences including a tour and tasting, which has generated over 100,000 visitors per year.

The distillery, in 2016, won Best Distillery Tour in the Distillery Experience Awards run by Drinks International, as well as Distillery Master award for Consumer Experience from the Spirits Business organisation.

On May 27, 2024, the Cotswolds Distillery was named the most popular whisky distillery in Great Britain and Ireland by the Cask Connoisseur 2024 Whisky Index.

== Collaborations ==
In 2024, the distillery collaborated with Highgrove to produce a limited-edition English single malt whisky made using heritage Plumage Archer barley grown at the Highgrove Estate. Further collaborative releases followed in subsequent years.

== Awards ==
=== Distillery ===
Both the Cotswolds Distillery gin and whisky has been well received and accredited, with both winning a multitude of awards in various competition.

The distillery's core range of products has performed excellently, as well as subsequent releases winning medals at competitions including the San Francisco World Spirits Competition and the International Wine & Spirit Competition.

=== Awards ===
Award	Date	Name of Product.	Competition Name	Cite
World's Best London Dry	2016	Cotswolds Dry Gin	World Gin Awards	
Best English Single Malt	2018	Cotswolds Signature Single Malt	World Whisky Awards	
Gold Award	2018	Cotswolds Signature Single Malt	The Spirits Business Awards	
Gold Award	2019	Cotswolds Signature Single Malt	International Wine and Spirit Competition	
Gold Award	2019	Cotswolds Founders Choice Whisky	International Wine and Spirit Competition	
Best English Single Malt	2019	Cotswolds Founders Choice Whisky	World Whisky Awards	
Silver Award	2019	Cotswolds Dry Gin	San Francisco World Spirits Competition	
Double Gold Award	2020	Cotswolds Founders Choice Whisky	San Francisco World Spirits Competition	
Gold Award	2020	Cotswolds Peated Cask Whisky	The Spirits Business Awards	
Best English Whisky	2020	Cotswolds Peated Cask Whisky	The International Whisky Competition	
Best Old Tom Gin	2020	Cotswolds Old Tom Gin	ADI International Spirits Competition	
Gold Award	2020	Cotswolds Old Tom Gin	The Spirits Business Awards	
Gold Award	2021	Cotswolds Sherry Cask Whisky	The Spirits Business Awards	
Double Gold Award	2021	Cotswolds Sherry Cask Whisky	San Francisco World Spirits Competition	
Best in Category	2021	Cotswolds Wildflower 1 Gin	ADI International Spirits Competition	
Gold Award	2021	Cotswolds Wildflower 2 Gin	ADI International Spirits Competition	
Gold Award	2021	Cotswolds Hedgerow Gin	San Francisco World Spirits Competition	
Best English Cream	2021	Cotswolds Irish Cream Liqueur	World Whisky Awards	
Best Old Tom Gin	2022	Cotswolds Old Tom Gin	World Whisky Awards	
Gold Award	2023	Cotswolds Wildflower 3 Gin	The Spirits Business Awards	
Gold Award	2024	Cotswolds Flaxen Vale: Harvest 2	International Wine and Spirit Competition	
Best Sherry Cask	2025	Cotswolds Sherry Cask Whisky	World Whisky Awards	
