= Heather Sheardown =

Canadian Chemical Researcher

Heather Sheardown FAIMBE FCAE
- Title: Dean

Academic work
- Discipline: Engineering
- Sub-discipline: Chemical and Biomedical Engineering
- Institutions: McMaster University

Heather Sheardown is a professor in the Chemical Engineering department at McMaster University in Hamilton, Ontario, Canada, and holder of a Tier 1 Canada Research Chair in Ophthalmic Biomaterials and Drug Delivery System from the Natural Sciences and Engineering Research Council (NSERC). Her research has focused on biomaterials and eye health, including bioengineered contact lenses, and eye drops that can be used for targeted drug delivery. She was the student of Professor John Brash.

Sheardown is a fellow of the Canadian Academy of Engineering, a fellow of the American Institute for Medical and Biological Engineering and in 2020, she received the Hamilton YWCA's Women of Distinction award in Science, Technology, and Trades. In 2021 she was appointed Acting Dean of the Faculty of Engineering, and was confirmed as Dean of Engineering in 2022.
