= Clean Water Network =

U.S. nonprofit organization

- Formation: 1992; 34 years ago
- Legal status: 501(c)(3) non-profit
- Purpose: To promote water health
- Headquarters: Washington, DC
- Region served: US
- Coordinator: Kristine Oblock
- Website: Official Webpage

The Clean Water Network (CWN) is an American coalition of more than 1,200 local, state, and national non-profit interest groups coordinating to promote water health, safety, and quality interests in the United States.

== History ==
CWN was formed in 1992 as a project of the Natural Resources Defense Council. The primary functions of CWN are to coordinate a variety of public interest organizations on clean water issues so that these groups may combine resources and advocate together and to "safeguard water quality for future generations by working to defend, strengthen, and implement the Clean Water Act and other key federal and state legislation impacting water."

The Clean Water Network serves public interest groups by serving as a portal for the latest news and information on federal clean water policy developments. The Network facilitates communications among member groups and coordinates joint policy and position statements as well as activities. This combination of federal policy work and field advocacy aims to achieve a stronger national program that will help to bring polluted waterways back to health and preserve the nation’s rivers, lakes, streams, wetlands, estuaries, and coastal waters.

== Collaboration ==
In 2008, CWN became its own 501(c)(3) independent organization. CWN’s main collaboration techniques include creating priority projects and campaigns with its members, hosting events, providing strategic communication tools, building partnerships, tapping local, state, and national expertise, and linking technical and policy experts with citizen leaders to help members participate in policy making.

== See also ==
- Clean Water Action
