= Centre for Research on Educational and Community Services =

Coordinates: 45°25′16.6″N 75°40′58.6″W

The Centre for Research on Educational and Community Services, or CRECS, is a research centre that collaborates with organizations in the education, social services and health sectors on research, evaluation, and training. Together, they work to improve social programs and policies for citizens, specifically those facing social exclusion.

CRECS was founded in Ottawa, Ontario and continues to operate at the University of Ottawa.

== History ==
CRECS was founded by professors Tim Aubry and Robert Flynn as the Community Services Research Unit (CSRU). The CSRU aimed to provide a point of contact between University of Ottawa faculty and students with community organizations, with the intention of collaborating on research projects that would develop and further success in health and social services. The CRSU also established a summer program offering training to practitioners in the non-profit sector. The research unit began over 20 studies with organizations and government agencies in the Ottawa area. They worked in several areas, including child welfare, homelessness, community mental health, and developmental disabilities. Continuing its success, CRSU received official status as a research centre and became the Centre for Research on Community Services (CRCS) within the Faculty of Social Sciences.

The Centre continued to grow with the addition of new collaborators and researchers, including Professors Brad Cousins, Doug Angus and Marie Drolet. As more staff members and both graduate and undergraduate students began to work at CRCS, the Centre increased its presence in the community through various externally funded projects and continued to work with many graduate students at the university.

In 2006, the centre was established as a bi-faculty research centre, the first of its kind, at the University of Ottawa. Along with the sponsorship came a name change, with the Centre being renamed to its current title, the Centre for Research on Educational and Community Services. Several other important changes were implemented, notably the creation of a Graduate Certificate Program in Program Evaluation, designed to train individuals in the public, private, and not-for-profit sectors so that they are able to conduct their own program evaluations.

Since then, the centre has continued to grow and continue its success. Visibility for the Centre continually increases with initiatives such as regular noon hour colloquiums and creating a web-based video series. CRECS has also organized research and training forums in collaboration with community organizations and providing funding and support for students.

== Strategic goals ==
CRECS is guided by the four strategic goals set by the University of Ottawa in its activities. Undergraduate, graduate, and post-doctoral students are involved with the centre.

Additionally, the Centre worked towards developing leaders through internationalization.
