= Comité Régional d'Action Viticole =

Group of militant French wine producers

Regional Committee for Viticultural Action
- Comité Régional d'Action Viticole
- Other name: Comité d'action viticole
- Founded: 1975
- Dates active: 1975–present
- Country: France
- Active regions: Languedoc-Roussillon
- Ideology: Protectionism; Localism; Direct Action; Occitan nationalism; Revolutionary Socialism
- Status: Active
- Size: 1,000

Comité Régional d'Action Viticole (CRAV, Regional Committee for Viticultural Action; Occitan: Comitat Regional per l'Accion Viticòla), or sometimes Comité d'action viticole (CAV, Committee for Viticultural Action; Comitat per l'Accion Viticòla), is a group of militant French wine producers of Occitania. It has claimed responsibility for numerous attacks, including bombing government buildings, hijacking tankers, and destroying large quantities of non-French wine.

CRAV is mainly active in Languedoc-Roussillon in the south of France, which is the French wine region which the group believes has been plagued by surplus production and a subsequent need to adapt the quality and quantity of wine produced to changing market realities, including reduced domestic demand for simple wine for everyday consumption. This process, which has involved considerable European Union subsidies, has had negative effects on smaller producers and has met with various protests, of which CRAV is the most violent.

CRAV's publicised demands have regularly included elements which are more-or-less impossible for French politicians to implement under European Union rules, since they would mean interfering with the single market and introducing national subsidies on top of the Common Agricultural Policy. The group has called for higher restrictive tariffs against the rising imports of Spanish and Italian wine, where lower social costs, less red tape and a different industry structure leads to more economical wine production. Consumer preference for wine brands, uncomplicated wine labels, varietal labelling, and New World wine styles has also led to expanding exports from Australia, Chile, the United States, and other New World producers.

Frustration spreads far beyond radical producers. "Each bottle of American and Australian wine that lands in Europe is a bomb targeted at the heart of our rich European culture," argues grower Aime Guibert. The French manager for the E. & J. Gallo Winery, Sylvain Removille, reports that he and his sales staff have repeatedly been physically assaulted.

On 17 May 2007, the group released a video in which it was stated that "blood would flow" if Nicolas Sarkozy failed to act to raise the price of wine.

== Attacks ==
A CRAV group enters the administrative offices of Vinadeis on 20 July 2016

In 2009 CRAV continued their actions against both bottlers and wine importers, including arson and the placing of explosives at importer's facilities.

- On 6 March 2006, over 120 masked men, armed with crowbars, attacked two warehouses in Sète, emptying the tanks of thousands of gallons of wine.
- In 2008, they attacked a building in Narbonne.
- In July 2013, the Socialist Party headquarters in the town of Carcassonne was bombed overnight. A canister-based device was used, and the outside of the building sprayed with the word CAV. The local school was also damaged.
- In early 2014, a letter was sent to members of the family owning the Chateau de la Rivere, saying that "James Grégoire has paid with his life for selling his estate, Château de la Rivière, to a foreigner exactly 10 days after our warning... The Chinese buyer, Lam Kok, has also paid with his life.". The former head of the Chateau, James Grégoire, had died in a helicopter crash ten days prior, along with the Chinese buyer Lam Kok, his son, and an interpreter. The letter was signed Comité d'action agricoles along with a phrase in Occitan, reading "we want to live in our own country". Police were not convinced of the claims, however.
- In March 2014, a telephone exchange was attacked near Toulouse, with CRAV graffiti left at the scene.
- In April 2015, coinciding with protests in Paris and Brussels, an attack was carried out on the A9 autoroute. Over 100 winemakers had gathered at a toll point in El Voló. They attacked five Spanish wine tankers – two were fully emptied, and three were allowed to leave half empty with "ILLEGAL WINE" sprayed on the trailers.
- In July 2016, an arson attack was carried out at the tasting room of the Jean Gleyzes estate, in Ouveillan, and the wall daubed with "Fraudeur, Bandit, CAV".
- Also in July 2016, thirty masked men broke into the Vinadeis company offices in Maureilhan, and attacked the office equipment inside with crowbars and hammers, while others set fire to tyres inside. They also tried to empty the wine vats, but found them already empty.
- In August 2016, CRAV attacked five wine vats belonging to distribution company Biron in the French town of Sète, releasing thousands of litres of wine which flooded into local properties. Emergency services had to step in to prevent the floods from causing too much damage.
- In 2024, on the night of 18 to 19 January, an administration building was blown up by an explosion in Carcassonne (Occitania). This act was claimed by the CRAV.

== See also ==
- Champagne Riots
- Globalization of wine
- French wine
- 2024 French farmers' protests
