= Rosalind and Morris Goodman Cancer Research Centre =

Affiliated with McGill University’s Faculty of Medicine and Health Sciences in Montreal, Quebec, Canada and established in 1978, the Rosalind & Morris Goodman Cancer Institute brings together world-leading scientists and clinicians in a vibrant, collaborative environment.

They are tackling the most important problems in cancer research through innovative thinking and a multidisciplinary approach, supported by top-notch infrastructures and a dedicated staff of research and administrative professionals.

Their 6 core themes of research include:

- Cancer Metabolism
- Tumour Microenvironment
- Cancer Genome Biology
- RNA Biology and Therapeutics
- Early-stage cancers and
- High-fatality Cancers

As of 2025, they are made up of 27 full faculty members and 47 associate members.

Professor Nahum Sonenberg, winner of the Wolf Prize, is a senior researcher at the institute.
