= Canadian Water Network =

Canadian non-profit organization

Canadian Water Network (CWN) is a hub for cross-sector collaboration to address Canada’s water challenges and opportunities.

As a non-partisan, non-profit organization, CWN works with a wide range of organizations and individuals with diverse perspectives and expertise to solve today’s complex water issues. Its partners and collaborators include government decision-makers, water managers, public health practitioners, community-based and Indigenous organizations, and representatives from water-dependent economic sectors, among others.

Its headquarters are currently located in Waterloo, Ontario, on the University of Waterloo campus. Canadian Water Network is a member of the Global Water Research Coalition (GWRC), an international water research alliance.

== History ==
Canadian Water Network was established in 2001 as a Network of Centres of Excellence (NCE) in response to Walkerton's drinking water crisis. From 2001 to 2015, CWN was funded by the Canadian government to help decision-makers access and apply relevant research to manage risks to the safety, security and abundance of Canada's water resources. In 2015, Canadian Water Network transitioned to a self-sustaining organization. It is governed by a board of directors representing government, municipal water utilities, non-profits and industry. In 2022, CEO Bernadette Conant passed the leadership of CWN to successor Nicola Crawhall.

== Canadian Municipal Water Consortium ==
In 2009, Canadian Water Network established the Canadian Municipal Water Consortium. The consortium is a national network of water utility leaders with a common goal of advancing sustainable, equitable and resilient urban water management. It provides a platform for leaders to share their knowledge and approaches to municipal water management and explore strategic issues on the horizon. Currently, the consortium supports senior decision-makers from 25 municipal water departments and utilities that collectively serve over 25 million people across Canada.

== Program areas ==
Canadian Water Network initiatives bring together leaders from different fields and sectors to learn from each other, share knowledge and work together to make a difference. CWN is working in three interconnected program areas.

- Water and communities: Helping communities and water-reliant economic sectors find solutions that effectively increase climate resilience and minimize GHG emissions.
- Water and health: Protecting human health from water-related risks and promoting health through proactive solutions.
- Water and climate: Helping leaders make more informed decisions about providing safe drinking water, wastewater and stormwater services.

In 2017, Canadian Water Network led a National Expert Panel on Canada's challenges and opportunities to address contaminants in wastewater. The findings from the panel were released in a report in 2018.

From 2004 to 2024, Canadian Water Network offered a leadership development program for students and young professionals in water.
