= CLUMEQ =

Supercomputer based in McGill University

CLUMEQ (Consortium Laval-UQAM-McGill and Eastern Quebec) was a Supercomputer based in McGill University founded in 2001 and has received two successive grants from the Canada Foundation for innovation. In 2011 CLUMEQ and its partner organization RQCHP were consolidated into a new consortium Calcul Québec.

== Computers ==
=== Past ===
Beowulf Cluster

- 256 CPUs
- AMD Athlon 1900+
- 1.6 GHz and 1.5 GB RAM / CPU
- Myrinet-2000 Switch
- 366 GB RAID-5 storage

SGI Origin 3800

- Sixty-four 600 MHz MIPS R14000 microprocessors
- 128 GB RAM
- 1.6 TB storage

Colosse

- 960 Sun Blade X6275 nodes (7680 cores total)
- 23 TB RAM
- Infiniband QDR network
- 1000 TB storage

Krylov

- 48 Sun Fire X4100 nodes (300 cores total)
- 384 GB RAM
- 15 TB storage

Guillimin

- 1200 compute nodes * 2 Intel Xeon 5650 hexa-core CPUs per node = 14400 cores @ 2.66 GHz
- 46 TB RAM
- Infiniband QDR network
- 2 PB storage
