= John Brash (chemical engineer) =

Canadian chemical engineer

Dr John Brash PhD, PEng
- Born: 1937 (age 88–89)

Academic background
- Education: Glasgow University
- Thesis: (1961)

Academic work
- Discipline: Engineering
- Sub-discipline: Chemical and Biomedical Engineering
- Institutions: McMaster University
- Doctoral students: Heather Sheardown

John L. Brash (born 1937) is a Canadian chemical engineer, having been Distinguished University Professor at McMaster University. One of his students, Heather Sheardown, is now a professor at McMaster.

== Awards ==
- Society of Biomaterials Founders Award
- Canadian Society for Chemical Engineering R.S. Jane Memorial Award
- Canadian Biomaterials Society Lifetime Achievement Award
