= Wine Research Centre =

The Wine Research Centre at the University of British Columbia was established in 1999.

== Background ==
Its mission is to conduct research in enology and viticulture and to prepare graduates with relevant scientific expertise and enterprise who will promote the technological advancement of the wine industry in Canada.

As of 2006, 28 scientists are conducting research into the molecular genetics of Saccharomyces cerevisiae and Vitis vinifera. Students learn experimental research design, genetic, biochemical and molecular technology, fermentation technology and viticulture.

An Advisory Board consisting of proprietors, winemakers, growers, representatives from the Liquor Distribution Branch, Pacific Agri-Food Research Centre at Summerland and the British Columbia Wine Institute guide the activities of the Wine Research Centre.

== See also ==
- Canadian wine

== Sources ==
- Wine Research Centre
