= Leslie Shemilt =

Canadian chemical engineer and professor

Leslie Webster Shemilt
- Born: 25 December 1919; Souris, Manitoba, Canada
- Died: December 20, 2011 (aged 91); Hamilton, Ontario, Canada
- Occupations: chemical engineer and professor
- Awards: Order of Canada

Leslie Webster Shemilt, OC FRSC (25 December 1919 - 20 December 2011 ) was a Canadian chemical engineer and professor.

Born in Souris, Manitoba, he received a B.A.Sc. degree in 1941 from the University of Toronto and a M.Sc. degree in 1946 from the University of Manitoba. He received a Ph.D. degree in physical chemistry from the University of Toronto in 1947.

In 1947, he joined the University of British Columbia as an assistant professor. He was appointed an associate professor in 1949 and a professor in 1957. From 1959 to 1960, he was the Shell Visiting Professor at the University College London. Returning to Canada in 1960, he joined the University of New Brunswick as a professor and head of the Department of Chemical Engineering. From 1969 to 1979, he was the dean of engineering at McMaster University.

From 1967 to 1985, he was the editor of the Canadian Journal of Chemical Engineering.

== Honours ==
In 1991, he was made an Officer of the Order of Canada "for the quality of his research in chemical engineering, his excellence as a teacher and his professional leadership". He is a Fellow of the Royal Society of Canada. He was awarded the Canadian Centennial Medal, the Queen Elizabeth II Silver Jubilee Medal, and the 125th Anniversary of the Confederation of Canada Medal.
