= McMaster Manufacturing Research Institute =

Manufacturing Research Facility

- Established: 2001
- Director: Stephen Veldhuis
- Endowment: Industrial Research Chair
- Location: McMaster University, Hamilton, Canada

The McMaster Manufacturing Research Institute (MMRI) is a major manufacturing research facility affiliated with the Department of Mechanical Engineering at McMaster University in Hamilton, Ontario.

The institute opened in 2001, and the director of the institute, Dr. Stephen Veldhuis, is an endowed research chair. The MMRI is known for high-quality services, adaptability, and visual content. As a member of SONAMI (the Southern Ontario Network for Advanced Manufacturing Innovation) along with centers at Niagara College, Mohawk College, and Sheridan College the MMRI is well connected to industry, as well as a TDS site for OCI's SME initiatives.

In 2020, after the impact of the COVID-19 pandemic became known, the MMRI collaborated with Hamilton Health Sciences to develop face shields and help with other types of PPE manufacturing.

The MMRI is home to multiple laboratories, including their most known, MSL (Machine System Laboratory) and MPAL (Material Property Assessment Laboratory).
