= Wine and Spirit Trade Association =

British trade association

The Wine and Spirit Trade Association (WSTA) is a British trade association for the wine and spirits industry, representing over 300 companies producing, importing and selling wines and spirits in the United Kingdom. WSTA members range from major retailers, brand owners and wholesalers to fine wine and spirit specialists, logistics and bottling companies.
