= Economy of England =

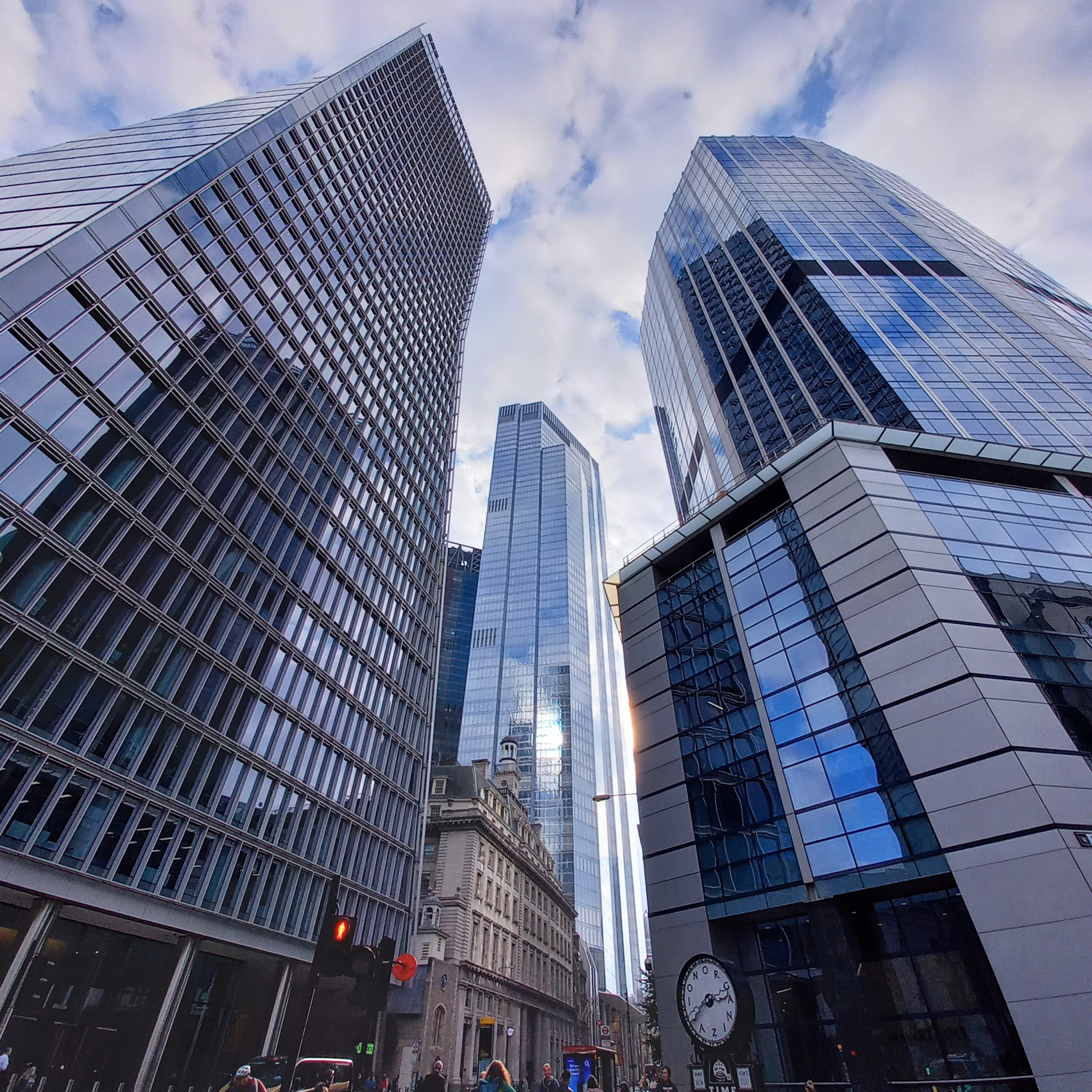
- The City of London, the financial capital of England, and the United Kingdom as a whole
- Currency: Pound sterling (£)
- Fiscal year: 1 April to 31 March (Note: 6 April – 5 April for personal tax)

Statistics
- Population: 58,834,812 (2025)
- GDP: £2.162 trillion (2022)
- GDP per capita: £37,852 (2022)
- Labour force: 28,081,000 / 74.9% in employment (Jan–Mar 2024) (Note: In employment and aged 16 or over (quantity) or aged 16–64 (percent))
- Labour force by occupation: List: 27.0% Professional; 15.1% Associate professional; 11.2% Managers, directors and senior officials; 9.5% Administrative and secretarial; 9.1% Elementary occupations; 8.6% Skilled trades; 7.8% Caring, leisure and other service; 6.1% Sales and customer service; 5.3% Process plant and machine operatives; (Jan–Dec 2023) (Note: Percent is a proportion of all persons in employment aged 16 and over)
- Unemployment: 1,298,000 / 4.4% (Jan–Mar 2024) (Note: Unemployed aged 16 and over. Percent is a proportion of economically active.)
- Average gross salary: £770.7 per week (2025) (Note: Median gross weekly pay for full time employees resident in England)

External
- Exports: £539.2 billion (2021) (Note: Goods and services)
- Export goods: List: £92.8bn Machinery and transport; £40.2bn Chemicals; £31.8bn Miscellaneous manufactures; £28.6bn Manufactured goods; £14.2bn Mineral fuels; £8.6bn Food and live animals; £7.4bn Crude materials; £2.3bn Beverages and tobacco; £0.4bn Animal and vegetable oils; £0.0bn Other commodities; £226.4bn Total; (2021) (Note: Excluding services)
- Main export partners: List: £110.5bn European Union; £42.2bn Asia & Oceania; £39.1bn North America; £11.9bn Middle East and North Africa (excl. EU); £10.3bn Western Europe (excl. EU); £5.0bn Eastern Europe (excl. EU); £3.9bn Sub-Saharan Africa; £3.2bn Latin America and Caribbean; £0.2bn Undefined country group; £226.4bn Total; (2021)
- Imports: £535.9 billion (2021)
- Import goods: List: £124.5bn Machinery and transport; £56.9bn Miscellaneous manufactures; £51.0bn Manufactured goods; £42.6bn Chemicals; £35.6bn Mineral fuels; £29.9bn Food and live animals; £12.0bn Crude materials; £5.5bn Beverages and tobacco; £1.3bn Animal and vegetable oils; £0.1bn Other commodities; £359.4bn Total; (2021)
- Main import partners: List: £178.6bn European Union; £86.9bn Asia & Oceania; £34.0bn Western Europe (excl. EU); £30.3bn North America; £10.0bn Middle East and North Africa (excl. EU); £8.0bn Eastern Europe (excl. EU); £7.1bn Sub-Saharan Africa; £4.4bn Latin America and Caribbean; — Undefined country group; £359.4bn Total; (2021)

England has a developed economy, considered the largest economy of the four countries of the United Kingdom. The English economy is one of the largest and most dynamic in the world. It has an average GDP per capita of £37,852 in 2022.

His Majesty's Treasury, led by the Chancellor of the Exchequer, is responsible for developing and executing the government's public finance policy and economic policy. Government involvement is also primarily exercised by the Department for Business and Trade and Department for Science, Innovation and Technology. Regarded as a highly developed social market economy, it has adopted many free market principles, yet maintains an advanced social welfare infrastructure.

England is a highly industrialised country. It is a leader in the high-tech, chemical and pharmaceutical sectors and in key technical industries, particularly aerospace, the arms industry, and the manufacturing side of the software industry. It is also an important producer of textiles and chemical products. Although automobiles, locomotives, and aircraft are among England's other important industrial products, a significant proportion of the country's income comes from the City of London and its financial hubs, banking, insurance, investment management and other related financial services. The UK technology sector is valued at US$1 trillion, third behind the United States and China, mostly based in England.

The service sector of the economy is largest in England and one of the largest in Europe. Construction industry, technology, and business services continue to produce economic growth, provided mainly by the growing services, administrative and financial sectors. Creative industries (arts, film production, product, fashion, design, music, IT, etc.) remain important to the national economy, with England having the second largest creative industry sector in Europe.

In the 18th century, England was the first nation to industrialise. In common with most other advanced industrialised economies, England has seen a decline in the importance of both manufacturing industries and primary-based extractive industries. Since the 1990s, the financial services sector has played an increasingly significant role in the English economy and the City of London is one of the world's largest financial centres. Banks, insurance companies, commodity and futures exchanges are heavily concentrated in the city.

The London Stock Exchange, the United Kingdom's main stock exchange and the largest in Europe, is England's financial centre, with 100 of Europe's 500 largest corporations being based there. The official currency in England is the pound sterling, whose ISO 4217 code is GBP. The "pound sterling" is the oldest currency in continuous use. Taxation in England is quite competitive when compared to much of the rest of Europe – as of 2014 the basic rate of personal tax is 20% on taxable income up to £31,865 above the personal tax-free allowance (normally £10,000), and 40% on any additional earnings above that amount.

England is a nation within the United Kingdom, which is a member of the Commonwealth of Nations, the G7, the G8, the G20, the CPTPP, the International Monetary Fund, the Organisation for Economic Co-operation and Development, the World Bank, the World Trade Organization, Asian Infrastructure Investment Bank and the United Nations.

== GDP ==
Gross Domestic Product (GDP) figures are estimated (using a variety of means) for independent nations, and used to measure and compare aggregate (total) wealth between countries. Since England is not an independent state, but constitutes one of the four major nations of the UK (along with Scotland, Wales, and Northern Ireland), there are fewer internationally comparable figures available.

GDP (2023)
Region	(billion $)	(billion €)	(billion £)
United Kingdom	3,601	3,160	2,720
England	3,085	2,707	2,330
London	818	718	618
Scotland	270	237	204
Wales	123	108	93
Northern Ireland	83	73	63

== History ==
In medieval times (c. 11th–15th centuries), the wool trade was the major industry of England, and the country exported wool to Europe. Many market towns and ports grew up on the industry and flourished. Following the Black Death and the agricultural depression of the late 15th century, the population began to increase; but it was less than 2 million in 1600. The growing population stimulated economic growth, accelerated the commercialisation of agriculture, increased the production and export of wool, encouraged trade and promoted the growth of London.

The high wages and abundance of available land seen in the late 15th and early 16th centuries were replaced with low wages and a land shortage. Various inflationary pressures, perhaps due to an influx of New World gold and a rising population, set the stage for social upheaval, with the gap between the rich and poor widening. This was a period of significant change for the majority of the rural population, with manorial lords beginning the process of enclosure of village lands that previously had been open to everyone.

John Leland left rich descriptions of the local economies he witnessed during his travels from 1531 to 1560. He described markets, ports, industries, buildings and transport links. He showed that some small towns were expanding, through new commercial and industrial opportunities, especially cloth manufacture. He suggested that investment by entrepreneurs and benefactors had enabled some small towns to prosper. Taxation was a negative influence on economic growth, since it was imposed not on consumption, but on capital investments. Exports increased significantly and privately owned companies traded with the colonies in the West Indies, North America and India.

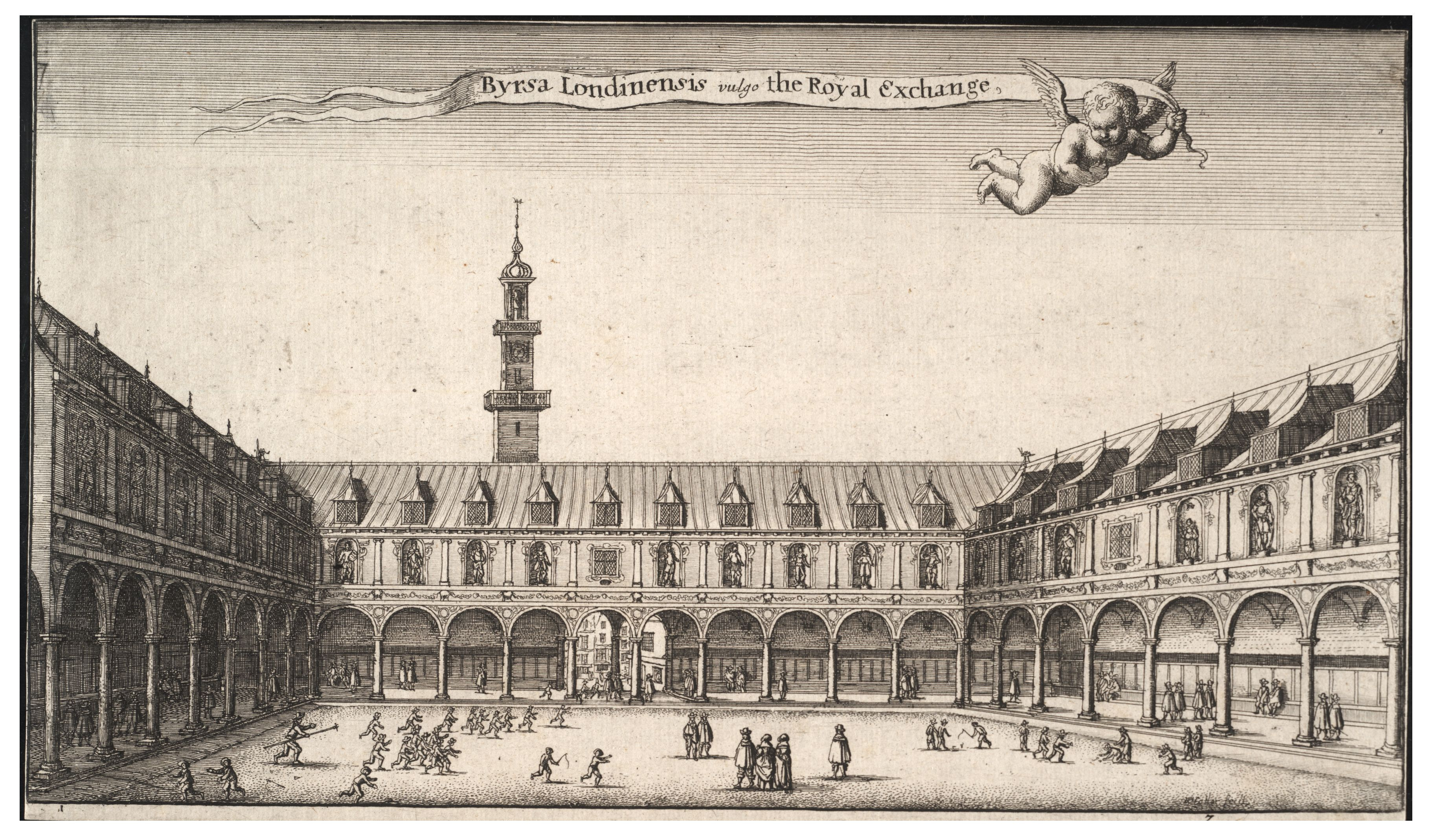
The Royal Exchange was founded in the Elizabethan era by the merchants to act as a centre of commerce. The site was provided by the City of London Corporation and the Worshipful Company of Mercers.

The Company of Merchant Adventurers of London brought together London's leading overseas merchants in a regulated company in the early 15th century, in the nature of a guild. This enabled them to import a large range of foreign goods. Elizabethan England avoided major defeats and built up a powerful navy. On balance, it can be said that Elizabeth I provided the country with a long period of general if not total peace and generally increased prosperity due in large part to stealing from Spanish treasure ships, raiding settlements with weak defences, and selling African slaves. Having inherited a virtually bankrupt state from previous reigns, her policies restored fiscal responsibility. Her fiscal restraint cleared the regime of debt by 1574, and ten years later the Crown enjoyed a surplus of £300,000.

Under Elizabeth I crafts and manufacturing activities received a boost. Glass, ceramic, silk industry and exports of wool manufactures could be promoted. Economically, Sir Thomas Gresham's founding of the Royal Exchange (1565), the first stock exchange in England and one of the earliest in Europe, proved to be a development of the first importance, for the economic development of England and soon for the world as a whole. With taxes lower than other European countries of the period, the economy expanded; with more wealth to go around at the end of Elizabeth's reign than at the beginning. This general peace and prosperity allowed the attractive developments of the "Golden Age".

=== 17th century ===
In 1600, the queen chartered the East India Company (later the British East India Company) in an attempt to break the Spanish and Portuguese duopoly of Far Eastern trade. It established trading posts, which in later centuries evolved into British India, on the coasts of what are now India and Bangladesh. Larger scale colonisation in North America began shortly after Elizabeth's death. Originally chartered as the "Governor and Company of Merchants of London Trading into the East-Indies", the East India Company rose to account for half of the world's trade during the mid-1700s and early 1800s, particularly in basic commodities including cotton, silk, indigo dye, sugar, salt, spices, saltpetre, tea, and opium. The Bank of England was established in 1694 by Charles Montagu, 1st Earl of Halifax to act as the English Government's banker. It was primarily founded to fund the war effort against France. The king and queen at the time, William and Mary, were two of the original stockholders. The original Royal Charter of 1694, granted by King William and Queen Mary, explained that the Bank was founded to ‘promote the public Good and Benefit of our People’.

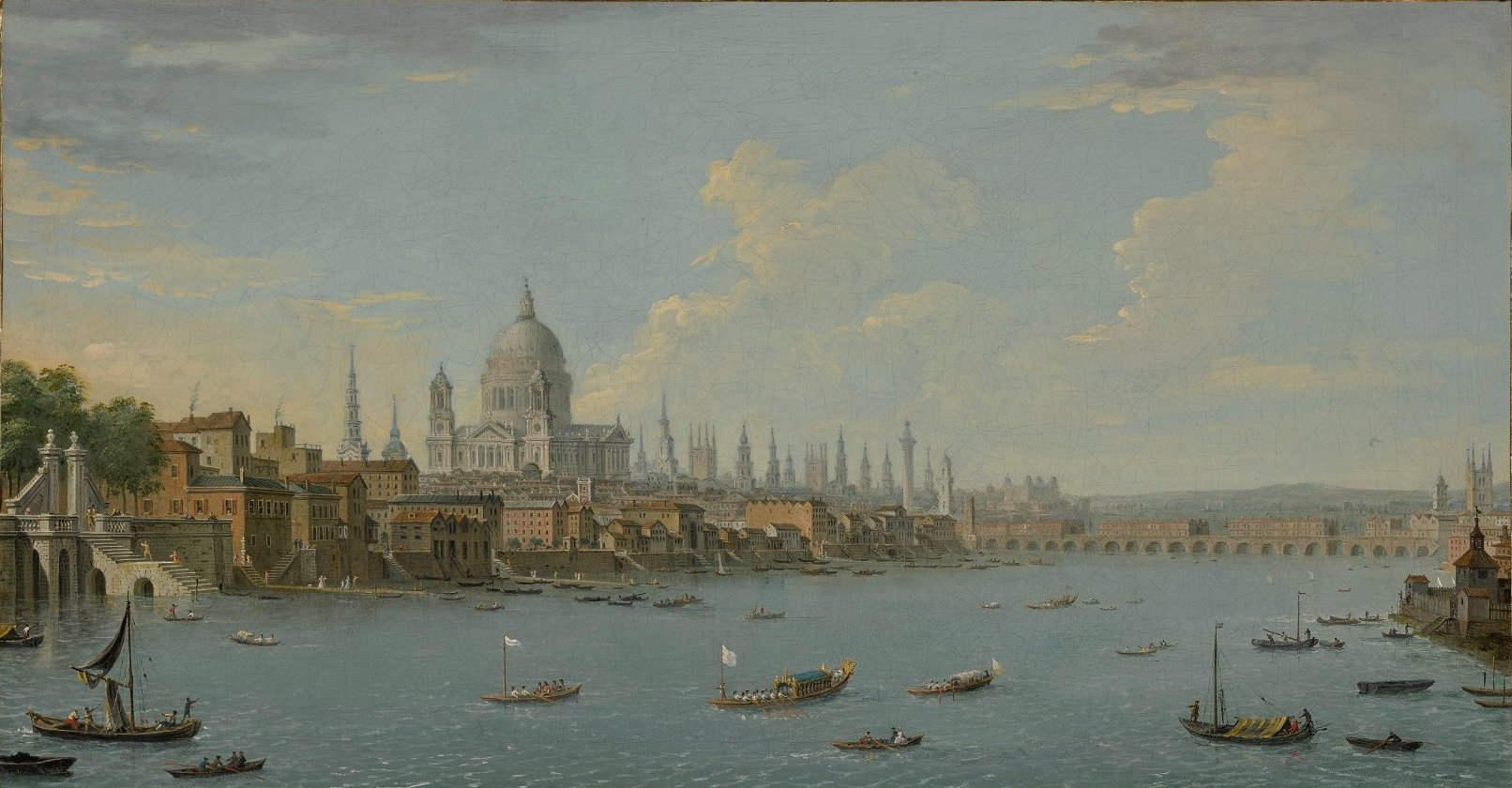
London during the Georgian era. The city became an important center for navy, ships and trading.

According to Derek Hirst, the 1640s and 1650s saw a revived economy with growth in manufacturing, the elaboration of financial and credit instruments, and the commercialisation of communication. The gentry found time for leisure activities, such as horse racing and bowling. In the high culture important innovations included the development of a mass market for music, increased scientific research, and an expansion of publishing. All the trends were discussed in depth at the newly established coffee houses.

England became one of the most prosperous economic regions in Europe between 1600 and 1700. Industrialisation in England from the mid-18th century resulted in economic developments described by many historians as the Industrial Revolution.

As a result, Great Britain was one of the premier economies in Europe throughout the 19th century, the most prominent industrial power in the world economy, and a major political power. Its industrialists were major innovators in machinery such as steam engines (for pumps, factories, railway locomotives and steamships), textile equipment, and tool-making. England pioneered the railway system, and built many systems and manufactured most of the equipment other nations used. Its businessmen were leaders in international commerce and banking, trade and shipping. Its markets included both areas that were independent and those that were part of the expanding British Empire. After 1840, an economic policy of mercantilism was abandoned and replaced by free trade, with few tariffs, quotas or restrictions. The powerful Royal Navy protected British commercial interests, shipping and international trade, while the British legal system enabled the resolution of disputes relatively inexpensively, and the City of London functioned as the economic capital and focus of the world economy.

== Sectors ==
=== Food and drink ===
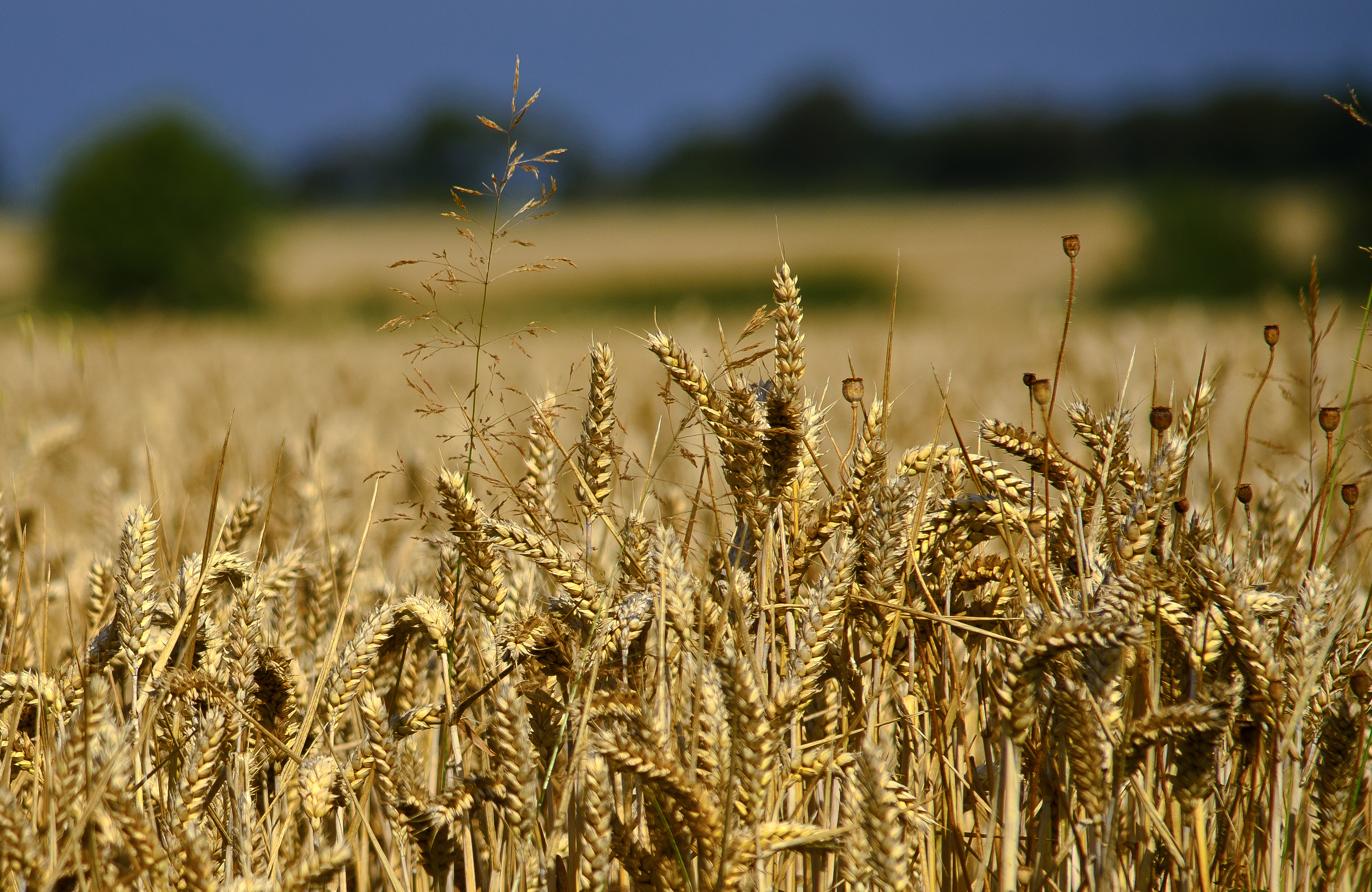
A field of wheat in England

The food and drinks industry is an important sector in England, worth £10.2 bn as of 2021, although this is down 9% from 2020 and 15% from 2019. Fruit and vegetable sales have been hit hardest, with sales down by 36%.

The top food and drinks export categories are:

- Agriculture (Note: Agriculture includes: cereal and cereal prep (£1.4 bn), Meat and meat prep (£1.1 bn), Dairy products (£778.7 m), Vegetables in and fruit (£632.9 m) and Animal and vegetables oils/fats (£412.1 m)) and Fisheries
- Alcoholic beverages (such as gin, wine, and whisky) (£2.3 bn)
- Miscellaneous (£1.7 bn)
- Hot beverages (such as coffee and tea) and spices (£1.2 bn)
- Sugar and honey (£245.4 m)

The top export destination for food and drinks exports from England is Ireland with 15% of all exports at a value of £1.5bn in 2021; this is down by 25% from 2020. There were also increases in exports to France and the USA with exports up by 12% and 10% respectively, with Germany and the Netherlands also among the top five export markets for the English food and drink sector.

==== Agriculture and fishing ====
Agriculture is intensive, highly mechanised and efficient by European standards, producing 60% of food needs with only 2% of the labour force. Two-thirds of production is devoted to livestock, the other to arable crops. The main crops that are grown are wheat, barley, oats, potatoes, sugar beets. England retains a significant and large fishing industry. Its fleets bring home fish of every kind, ranging from sole to herring. It is also rich in natural resources including coal, petroleum, natural gas, tin, limestone, iron ore, salt, clay, chalk, gypsum, lead, and silica.

The United Kingdom fishing industry contributed £446 million in 2019 in terms of Gross Value Added (GVA); this represents 0.02% of the UK's total GVA. In 2021, 53% of fishers were based in England and Wales, 40% in Scotland and 8% in Northern Ireland. The largest English region was the South West, contributing 10% of overall output in the sector.

The fishing industry in England catches a variety of different fish and seafood including North Sea Cod, North Sea Whiting, North Sea Haddock, Southern Sea Crab, West of Scotland Nephrops and Eastern English Channel Scallops.

The Environment Agency is a non-departmental public body, established in 1995 and sponsored by the Department for Environment, Food and Rural Affairs with responsibilities relating to the protection and enhancement of the environment in England. The Secretary of State for Environment, Food and Rural Affairs is the minister responsible for environmental protection, agriculture, fisheries and rural communities in England.

==== Alcoholic beverages ====
In 2019 England sold 550,000 bottles of English wine to 50 countries worldwide, this is up from 256,000 in 2018.

In 2022 the total value of English wine exports was £9.6 million ($11.8 million) with 800,000 bottles sold.

Major English wine brands include: Ridgeview Bloomsbury, Bolney Wine Estate, Lyme Bay, Aldwick Court Farm, Hattingley Valley, Lyme Block, Chapel Down, Brightwell Vineyard, and Stopham Estate.

As of March 2021 there are more distilleries in England (311) than in Scotland (214); this is due to an increase in English gin sales which increased the number of English distilleries to over 300 for the first time.

As of 2023 there are currently 38,000 casks of English whisky maturing, with an estimated 50,000 casks expected to be laid down by 2024. The estimated value of the maturing whisky stock is £1bn.

Major English whisky brands include: English Whisky Co, Cotswolds, The Lakes, Bimber, The Oxford Artisan, and Dartmoor.

=== Industry ===
The leading industrial sectors in England are services, manufacturing, construction, agriculture, and tourism. The service industry in England comprises several key industries, including finance and business services, retail, food and beverage, and entertainment. The Industrial Revolution started in England with an initial concentration on the textile industry, followed by other heavy industries such as shipbuilding, coal mining and steelmaking. English merchants, shippers and bankers developed overwhelming advantage over those of other nations allowing the country to dominate international trade in the 19th century. Shipbuilding continues, between September 2021 and the end of 2022, the government announced £4.34 billion in shipbuilding contracts to UK companies. The UK also produces luxury boats from Princess, Sunseeker and Fairline. Manufacturing remains a significant part of the economy but accounted for only 16.7 per cent of national output in 2003.

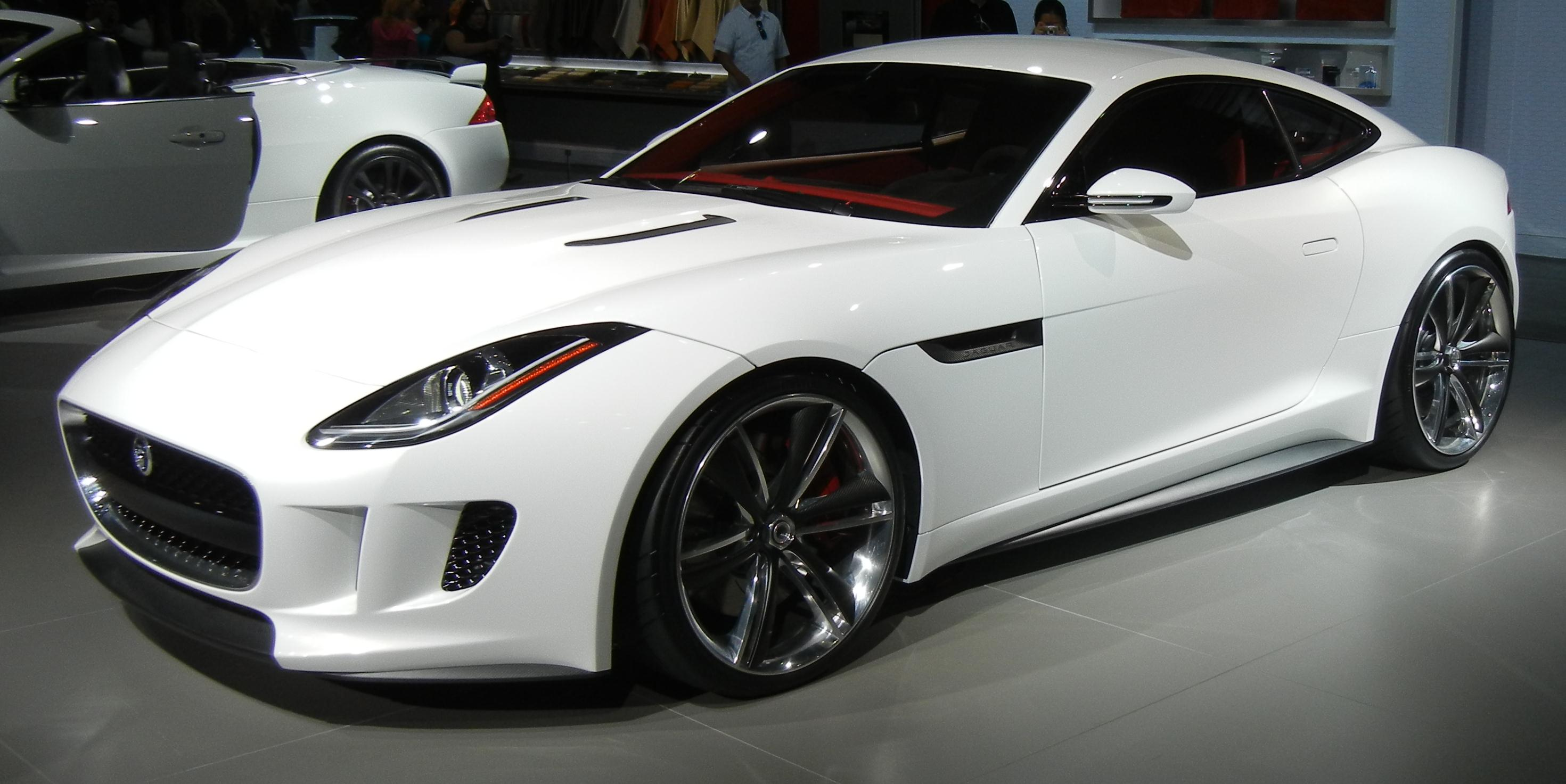
Jaguar is a well-known English luxury vehicle brand of Jaguar Land Rover, a multinational manufacturer with its headquarters in Coventry.

The automotive industry employs around 800,000 people, with a turnover in 2015 of £70 billion, generating £34.6 billion of exports (11.8 per cent of the UK's total export goods). In 2015, the UK produced around 1.6 million passenger vehicles and 94,500 commercial vehicles. England is a major centre for engine manufacturing: in 2015 around 2.4 million engines were produced. including luxury cars such as Rolls-Royce, Bentley and Range Rover. It is also the world's fourth-largest exporter of engines, as of 2021.

The motorsport industry employs around 41,000 people, comprises around 4,500 companies and has an annual turnover of around £6 billion. 7 of the 10 Formula One teams are based in England, with their technology being used in supercars and hypercars from McLaren, Aston Martin and Lotus.

Research and development spending is also high in the UK. In 2019, total expenditure on R&D was £38.5 billion. R&D investment has risen steadily over the past few decades, from £20.4 billion in 1986 to the current total of £38.5 billion, an increase of 96%. England's research and development funding and incentives and business infrastructure help support an environment of technology innovation.

The United Kingdom was ranked in the top 5 countries in the Global Innovation Index 2023. London has been named as the fastest growing technology hub in Europe, with England having over 100 unique tech companies with a value of $1 billion or more. A boom in investment in technology has led to tech and IT-related vacancies now making up 13% of all UK job vacancies. In Eastern England, overall hiring has increased by nearly 14% in the tech sector, and 12% in North West England and South West England. The UK technology sector is valued at US$1 trillion, third behind the United States and China, mostly based in England.

A growing number of technology companies are based in London, notably in East London Tech City also known as Silicon Roundabout. Investment in London's technology sector was $2.28 billion in 2015, 69 per cent higher than the $1.3 billion raised in 2014. Since 2010, London-based technology companies have collectively raised $5.2 billion of venture capital funding. A report by EY highlighted the importance of London to the UK's FinTech industry in terms of availability of expertise and demand for services.

The Haldane principle, that decisions about what to spend research funds on should be made by researchers rather than politicians, is influential in research policy. UK Research and Innovation (UKRI) is a non-departmental public body that directs research and innovation funding. There are several university departments with a focus on science policy, such as the Science Policy Research Unit. There are nine bodies in UKRI, comprising the seven research councils and two additional bodies, Innovate UK and Research England. Research England is responsible for the Research Excellence Framework. The research councils include:

- Arts and Humanities Research Council (AHRC)
- Biotechnology and Biological Sciences Research Council (BBSRC)
- Economic and Social Research Council (ESRC)
- Engineering and Physical Sciences Research Council (EPSRC)
- Medical Research Council (MRC)
- Natural Environment Research Council (NERC)
- Science and Technology Facilities Council (STFC)

The Department for Business and Trade and Secretary of State for Business and Trade has responsibility for business. The Department for Science, Innovation and Technology, Secretary of State for Science, Innovation and Technology, and Minister of State for Science, Research and Innovation has responsibility for science and innovation development in England.

=== Construction ===
The construction industry of England employed around 2 million people and contributed gross value of £123.2 billion to the economy in 2019.

One of the largest construction projects in England in recent years was Crossrail, costing an estimated £19 billion. Opened in 2022 by Queen Elizabeth II and named the Elizabeth line, it is a new railway line running east to west through London and into the surrounding area, with a branch to Heathrow Airport. It was the largest construction project in Europe. The main feature of the project is construction of 42 km (26 mi) of new tunnels connecting stations in central London. Ongoing construction projects include the High Speed 2 line between London and the West Midlands. Crossrail 2 is a proposed rail route in the South East of England.

=== Finance ===
The UK financial services industry added gross value of £116,363 million to the UK economy in 2011. England's exports of financial and business services make a significant positive contribution towards the country's balance of payments.

England's capital houses the City of London, a major financial district, and one of the world's leading financial centres. The City of London is a major business and financial centre, and the Bank of England is headquartered in the City of London. Throughout the 19th century, the City of London was the world's primary business centre, and it continues to be a major meeting point for finance.

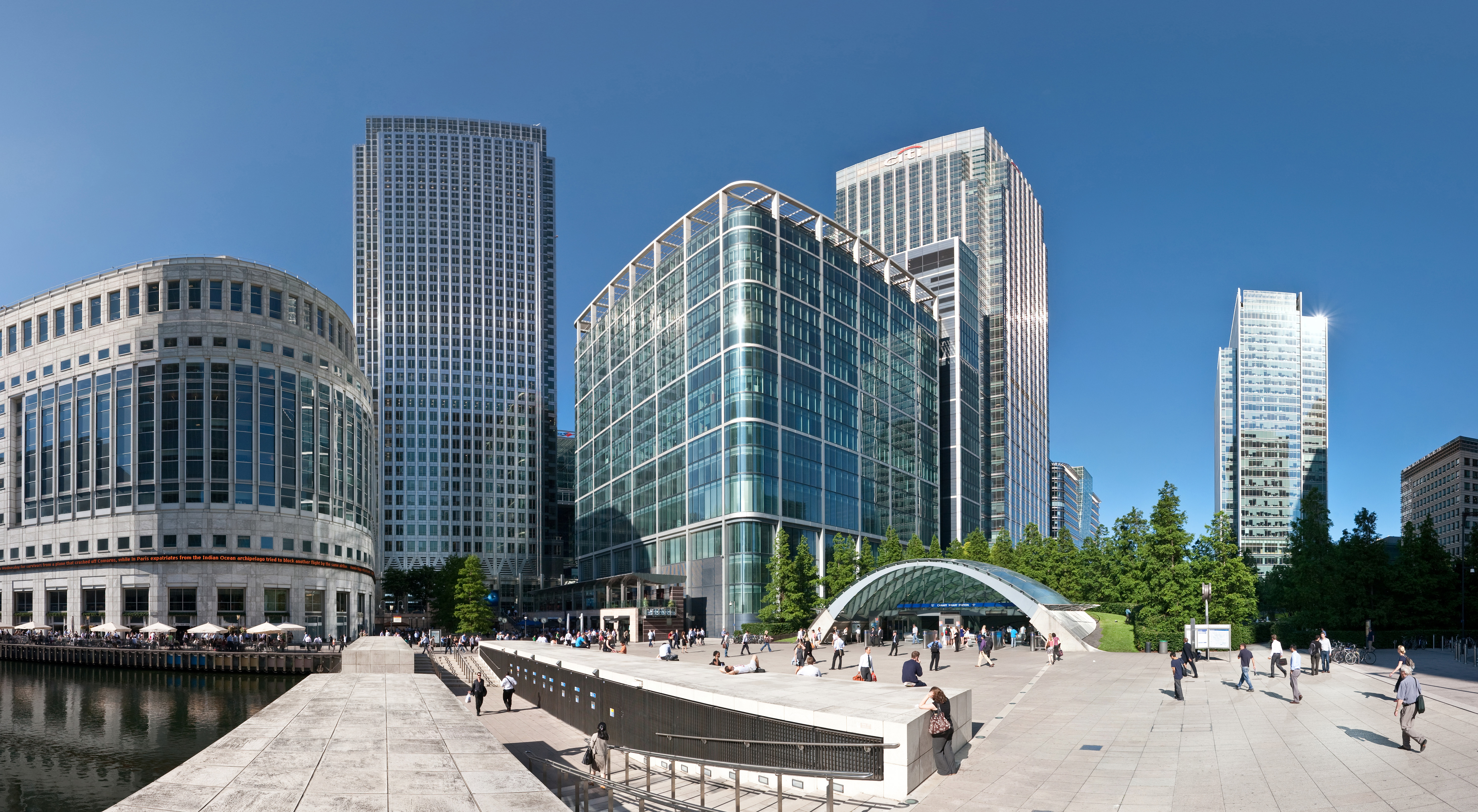
Canary Wharf is a major business and financial district in London.

The London Stock Exchange, the United Kingdom's main stock exchange and the largest in Europe, is England's financial centre, with 100 of Europe's 500 largest corporations being based there. As of March 2021, the total market value of all companies trading on the London Stock Exchange was £3.8 trillion. It was founded in 1801, making it one of the oldest exchanges in the world. It is part of London Stock Exchange Group (LSEG).

There are over 500 banks with offices in London, and it is the leading international centre for banking and insurance, Eurobonds, foreign exchange trading and energy futures. London's financial services industry is primarily based in the City of London and Canary Wharf. The City houses the London Metal Exchange, Lloyd's of London, and the Bank of England.

Canary Wharf began development in the 1980s and is now home to major financial institutions such as Barclays Bank, Citigroup and HSBC, as well as the Financial Services Authority. Developed on the site of the former West India Docks, Canary Wharf contains large offices and banks. It comprises many open areas, including Cabot Square and Westferry Circus. After the London Docklands closed in 1980, the government adopted policies to stimulate redevelopment of the area, including the creation of the London Docklands Development Corporation (LDDC) in 1981 and the granting of Urban Enterprise Zone in 1982. London is also a major centre for other business and professional services, and four of the six largest law firms in the world are headquartered there.

Financial services in the United Kingdom contributed a gross value of £86 billion to the UK economy in 2004. It creates significant benefits for the England, UK, European and global economies. The industry employed around 1.2 million people in the third quarter of 2012. The estimated amount of total taxes paid by the Financial Services Sector in the year to 31 March 2012 is £63bn, 11.6% of the total UK government tax receipts.

Service industries, particularly banking, insurance, investment management, business services and other related financial services account by far for the largest proportion of GDP. Leeds is England's second largest financial centre, with over 30 national and international banks based in the city. Over 124,000 people are employed in banking and financial services in Leeds, and over in the wider Leeds City Region. Manchester is the largest financial and professional services sector outside London and is the mid tier private equity capital of Europe.

=== Manufacturing ===
In the 1970s, manufacturing accounted for over 20 percent of the economy. Total employment in manufacturing fell from 7.1 million in 1979 to 4.5 million in 1992 and only 2.7 million in 2016, when it accounted for 10% of the economy. Manufacturing has increased in 36 of the last 50 years and was twice in 2007 what is in 1958.

In 2011 the UK manufacturing sector generated approximately £140,539 million in gross value added and employed around 2.6 million people. Of the approximately £16 billion invested in R&D by UK businesses in 2008, approximately £12 billion was by manufacturing businesses, mostly located in England. In 2008, the UK was the sixth-largest manufacturer in the world measured by value of output.

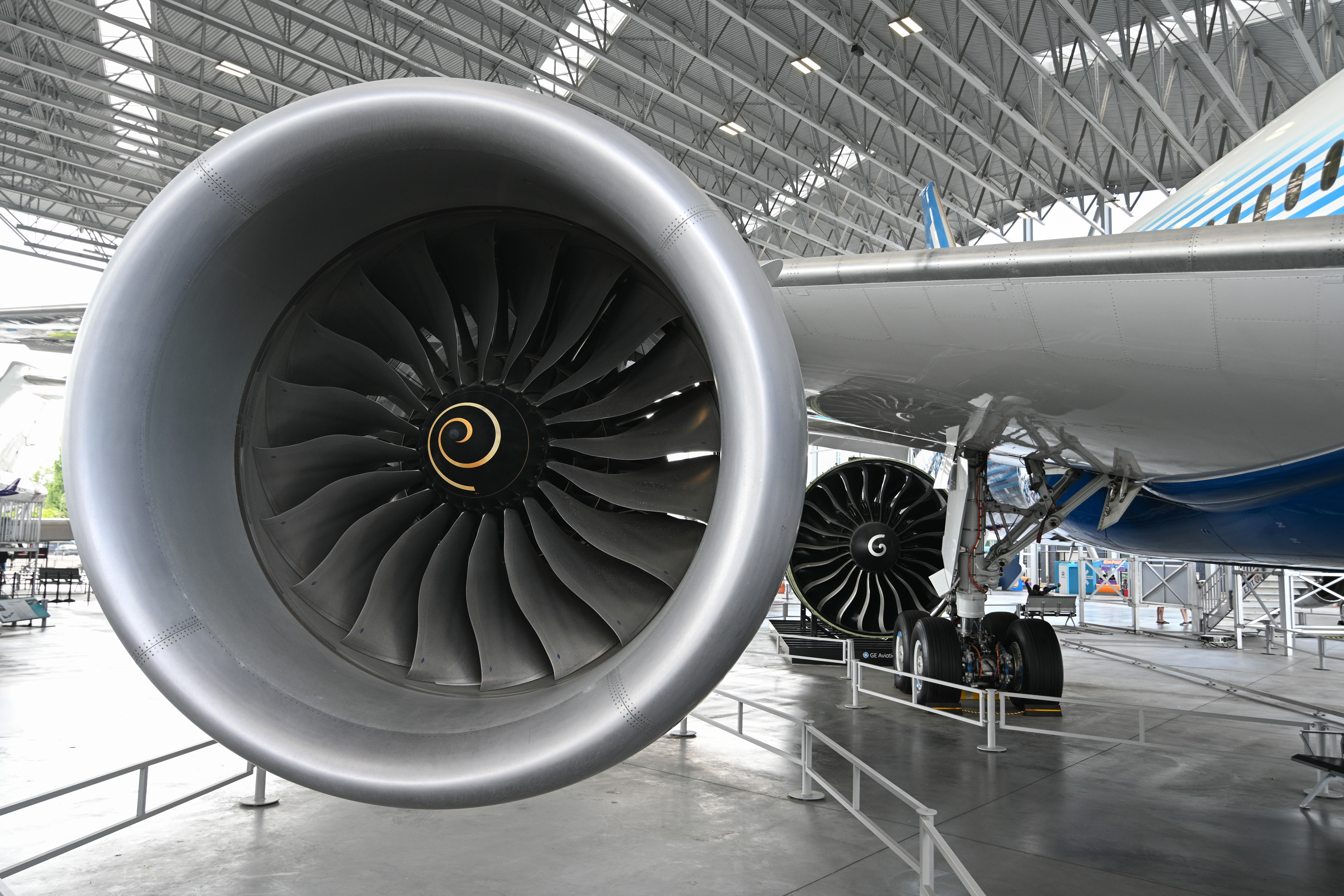
A Rolls-Royce Trent 1000 jet engine made in England

The aerospace industry of the UK is the second- or third-largest aerospace industry in the world, depending upon the method of measurement. The industry employs around 113,000 people directly and around 276,000 indirectly and has an annual turnover of around £20 billion. English companies with a major presence in the industry include BAE Systems and Rolls-Royce (the world's second-largest aircraft engine maker). European aerospace companies active in England and the UK include Airbus, whose commercial aircraft, space, helicopter and defence divisions employ over 13,500 people.

The pharmaceutical industry employs around 67,000 people in the UK and in 2007 contributed £8.4 billion to the UK's GDP and invested a total of £3.9 billion in research and development. In 2007 exports of pharmaceutical products from the UK totalled £14.6 billion, creating a trade surplus in pharmaceutical products of £4.3 billion. England is home to GlaxoSmithKline and AstraZeneca, respectively the world's third- and seventh-largest pharmaceutical companies. England remains a key player in the aerospace, defence, pharmaceutical and chemical industries, and English companies worldwide continue to have a role in the sector through foreign investment.

=== Renewable energy ===
Successive UK governments have outlined numerous commitments to reduce carbon dioxide emissions. England is one of the best sites in Europe for wind energy, and wind power production is its fastest growing supply. The total of all renewable electricity sources provided 38.9 per cent of the electricity generated in the UK in the third quarter of 2019, producing 28.8 TWh of electricity. England is home to Hornsea 2, the largest offshore wind farm in the world, situated in waters roughly 89 kilometres off the coast of Yorkshire.

The Climate Change Act 2008 was passed in Parliament with an overwhelming majority across political parties. It sets out emission reduction targets that the UK must comply with legally. It represents the first global legally binding climate change mitigation target set by a country. In June 2017 renewables plus nuclear generated more UK power than gas and coal together for the first time and new offshore wind power became cheaper than new nuclear power for the first time.

Government energy policy aims to play a key role in limiting greenhouse gas emissions, whilst meeting energy demand. Shifting availabilities of resources and development of technologies also change the country's energy mix through changes in costs. In 2024, the United Kingdom ranked 5th out of 180 countries in the Environmental Performance Index.

A law has been passed that greenhouse gas emissions will be net zero by 2050 in England. The Energy and Climate Intelligence Unit (ECIU) has said it would be affordable.[124][125] The target for 2030 is a 68% reduction compared with 1990 levels.[126] As part of an economic stimulus to attempt to get out of the COVID-19 recession a green industrial policy was announced.[127] One of the methods of reducing emissions is the UK Emissions Trading Scheme.[128] Businesses and employees are given tax breaks for electric cars and a much larger proportion of business vehicle purchases are electric than those of consumers.[129]

=== Retail ===
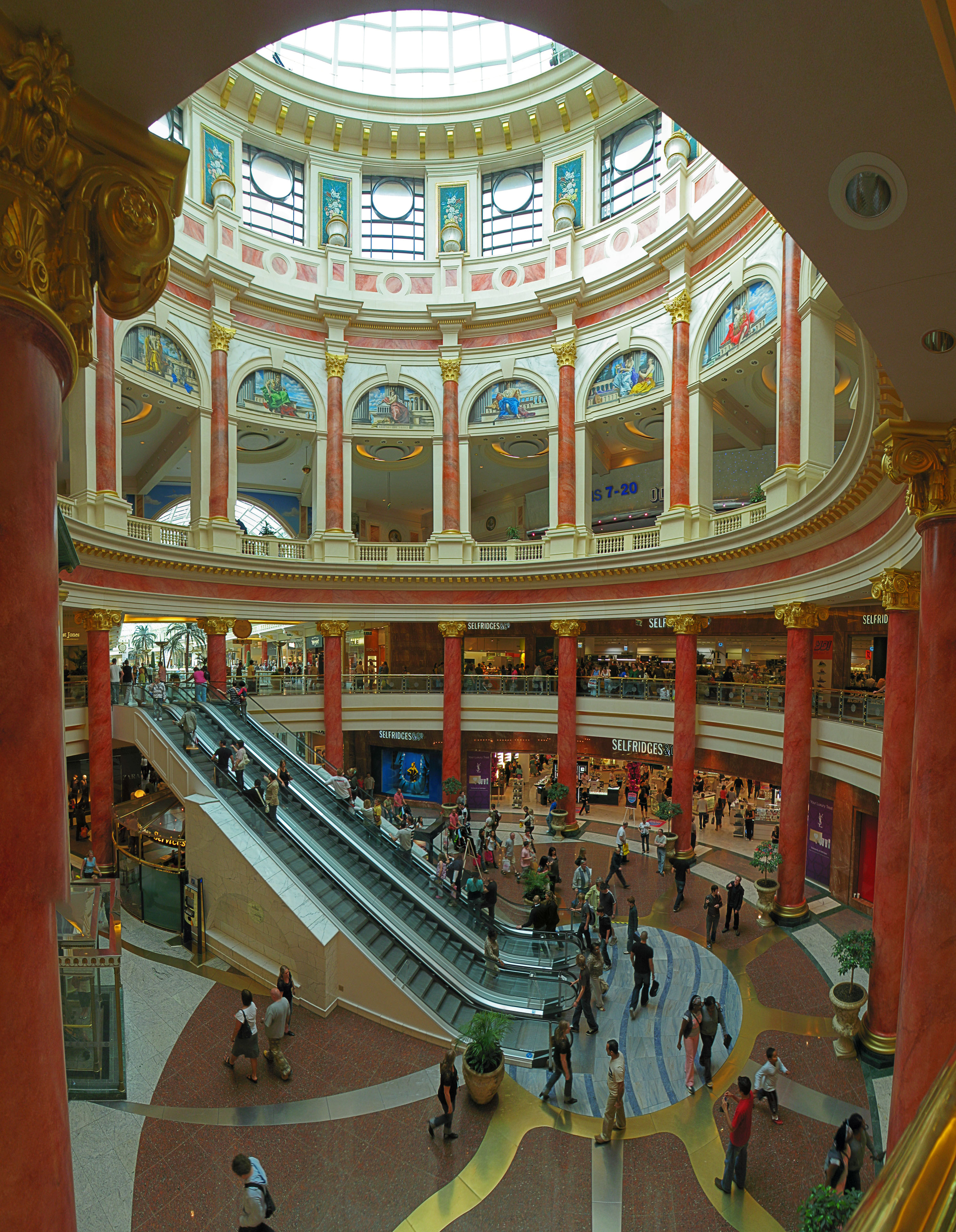
The Trafford Centre is a large indoor shopping centre and entertainment complex in Manchester.

By the 17th century, permanent shops with more regular trading hours were beginning to supplant markets and fairs as the main retail outlet. Provincial shopkeepers were active in almost every English market town. As the number of shops grew, they underwent a transformation. The trappings of a modern shop, which had been entirely absent from the sixteenth- and early seventeenth-century store, gradually made way for store interiors and shopfronts that are more familiar to modern shoppers.

Prior to the eighteenth century, the typical retail store had no counter, display cases, chairs, mirrors, changing rooms, etc. However, the opportunity for the customer to browse merchandise, touch and feel products began to be available, with retail innovations from the late 17th and early 18th centuries.

Following the Great Fire of London (1666), the city of London was completely rebuilt. Shops were permitted in the principal street or 'high street', but not in the by-lanes or back streets. This may have been based on the need for high visibility in order to regulate retail trade, as well as to avoid congestion in the narrow lanes and back streets. Accordingly, from the 17th century, the term "High Street" gradually assumed a narrower meaning and came to describe thoroughfares with significant retail in large villages and towns. In the late 17th and 18th centuries, the number of High Streets increased markedly. The 19th century was a "golden era" for high street shops. The rise of the middle class in Victorian England contributed to a more favourable attitude to shopping and consumption. Shopping centres became places to see and be seen, for recreational shopping, and for promenading.

The retail sector in England includes the motor trade, auto repairs, personal and household goods industries. The sector added gross value of £151,785 million to the UK economy in 2011. As of 2016, high-street retail spending accounted for about 33% of consumer spending and 20% of GDP. Because 75% of goods bought in the United Kingdom are made overseas, the sector only accounts for 5.7% of gross value added to the British economy. Online sales account for 22% of retail spending in the UK, third highest in the world after China and South Korea, and double that of the United States.

The grocery market in England is dominated by four companies: Tesco (27% market share), Sainsbury's (15.4%), Asda (14.9%) and Morrisons (10%), these supermarkets are known as the "Big Four". However, supermarkets such as Aldi have grown in popularity. London is a major retail centre and in 2010 had the highest non-food retail sales of any city in the world, with a total spend of around £64.2 billion. Outside of London, Manchester and Birmingham are also major retail destinations, the UK is also home to many large out of town shopping centres like Meadowhall, away from the main high streets in town and city centres. Whilst the big international names dominate most towns and cities have streets or areas with many often quirky independent businesses. Tesco is the fourth-largest retailer in Europe measured by turnover.

=== Tourism ===
Tourism accounted for £96 billion of GDP (8.6% of the economy) in 2009. It employs over 2 million people – around 4% of the working population. England has a rich history in areas such as architecture, tradition, art and sport and is home to over 1,600 museums, most free of charge to visit.

English Heritage is a governmental body with a broad remit of managing the historic sites, artefacts and environments of England. It is currently sponsored by the Department for Culture, Media and Sport. Historic England (officially the Historic Buildings and Monuments Commission for England) is an executive non-departmental public body. It is tasked with protecting the historic environment of England by preserving and listing historic buildings, scheduling ancient monuments, registering historic parks and gardens and by advising central and local government.

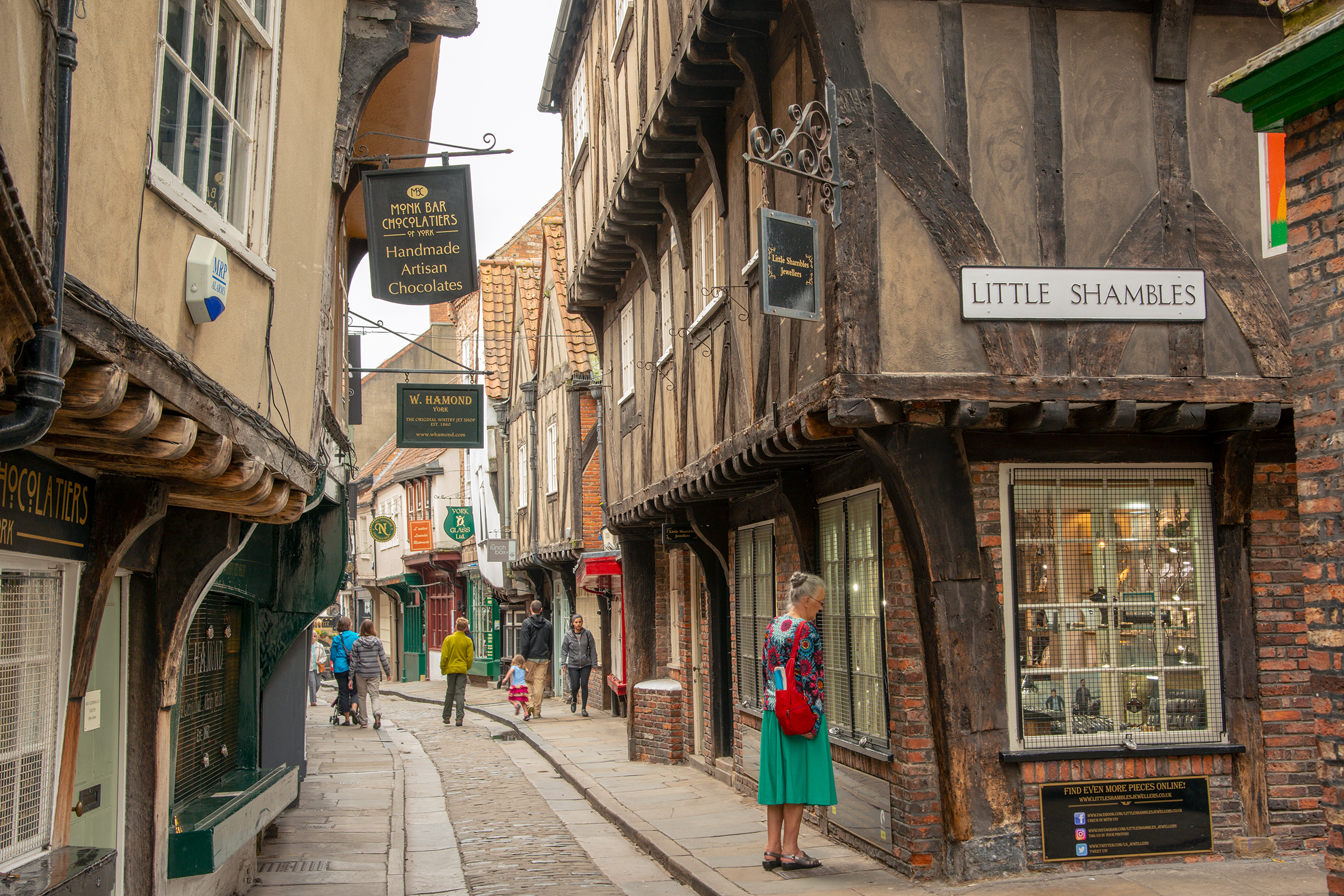
York

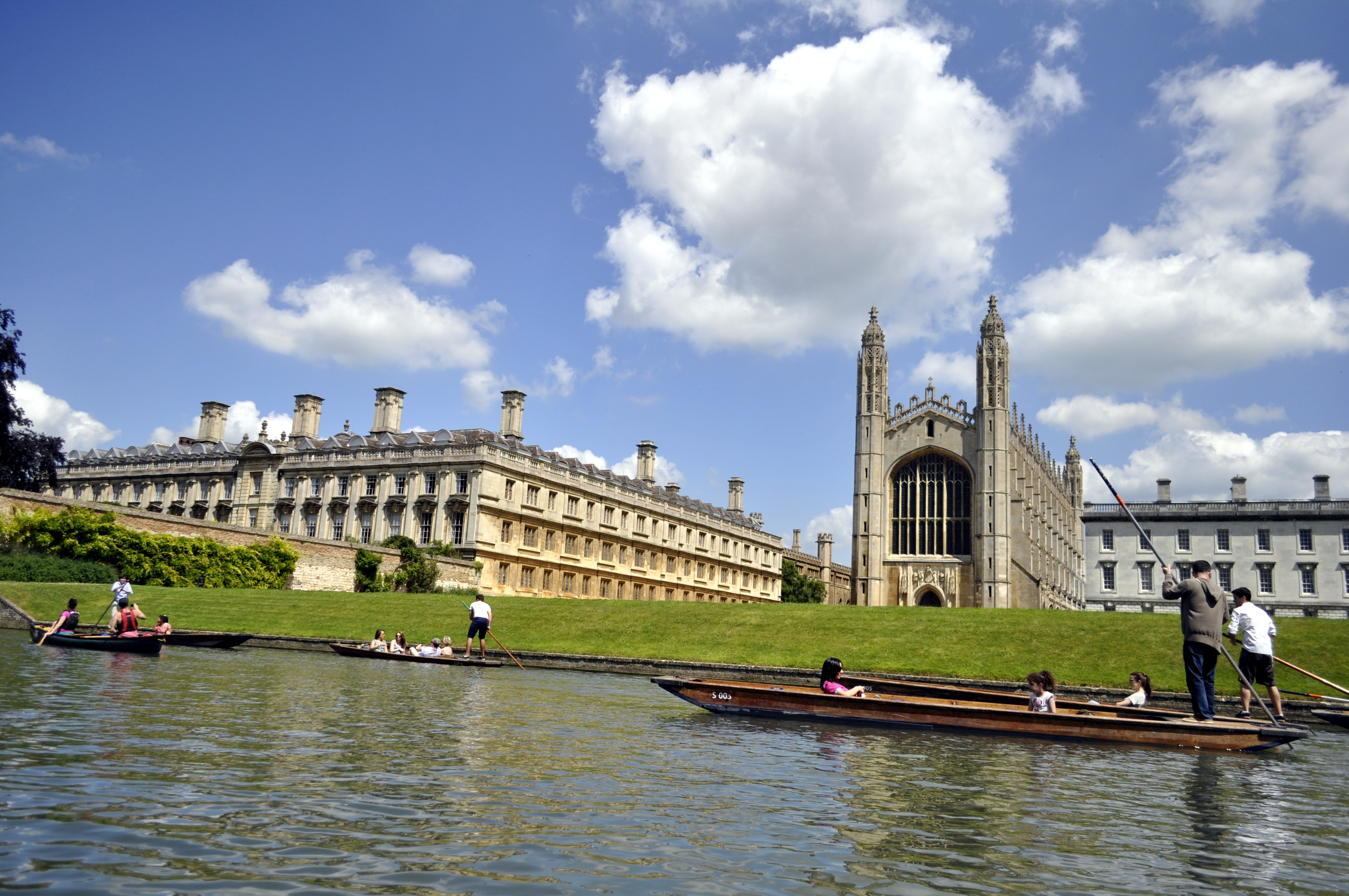
Cambridge

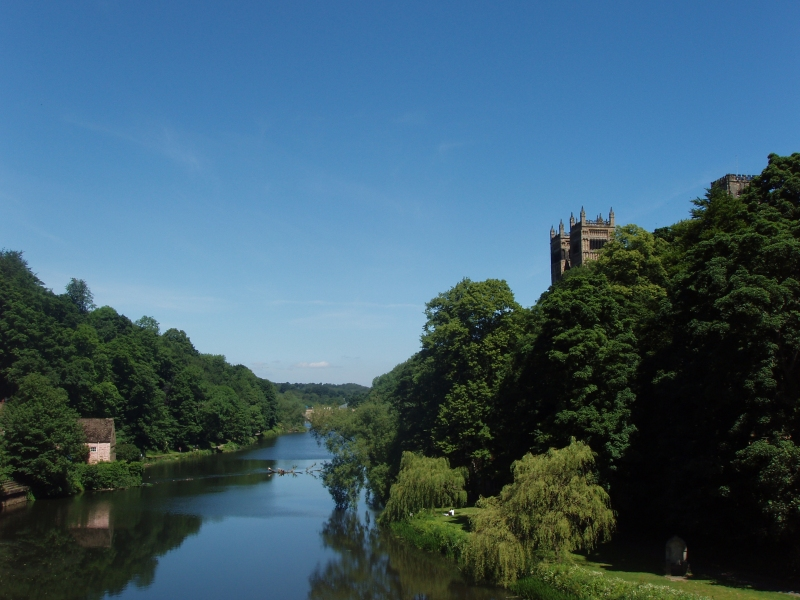
Durham

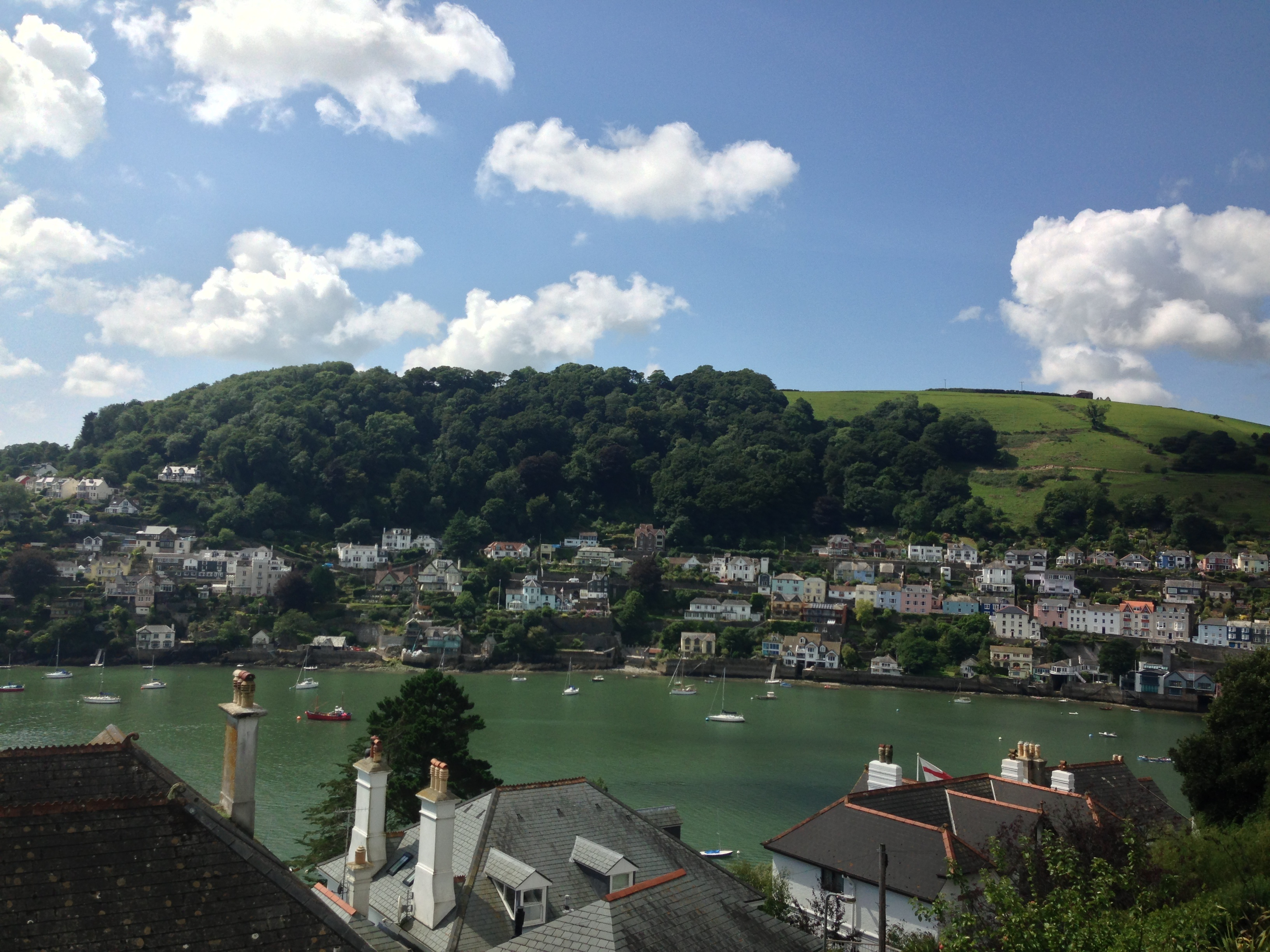
Devon

The National Trust for Places of Historic Interest or Natural Beauty is a charity which also maintains multiple sites. Of the 25 United Kingdom UNESCO World Heritage Sites, 17 are in England. Some of the best known of these include Stonehenge, Avebury and Associated Sites, Tower of London, Jurassic Coast, Palace of Westminster, Roman Baths, City of Bath, Saltaire, Ironbridge Gorge, Studley Royal Park and more recently the English Lake District. The northernmost point of the Roman Empire, Hadrian's Wall, is the largest Roman artefact anywhere: it runs for a total of 73 miles in northern England.

The Department for Culture, Media and Sport has responsibility for tourism, arts and culture, cultural property, heritage and historic environments, libraries, and museums and galleries in England. The largest centre for tourism is London, which attracted close to 20 million tourists in 2016 alone. The British Museum (featuring over 8 million objects in its vast collection) has served as a major tourist attraction with over 5,906,716 visitors in 2017 alone. It is largely considered a global centre of finance, art, and culture.

=== Transport and logistics ===
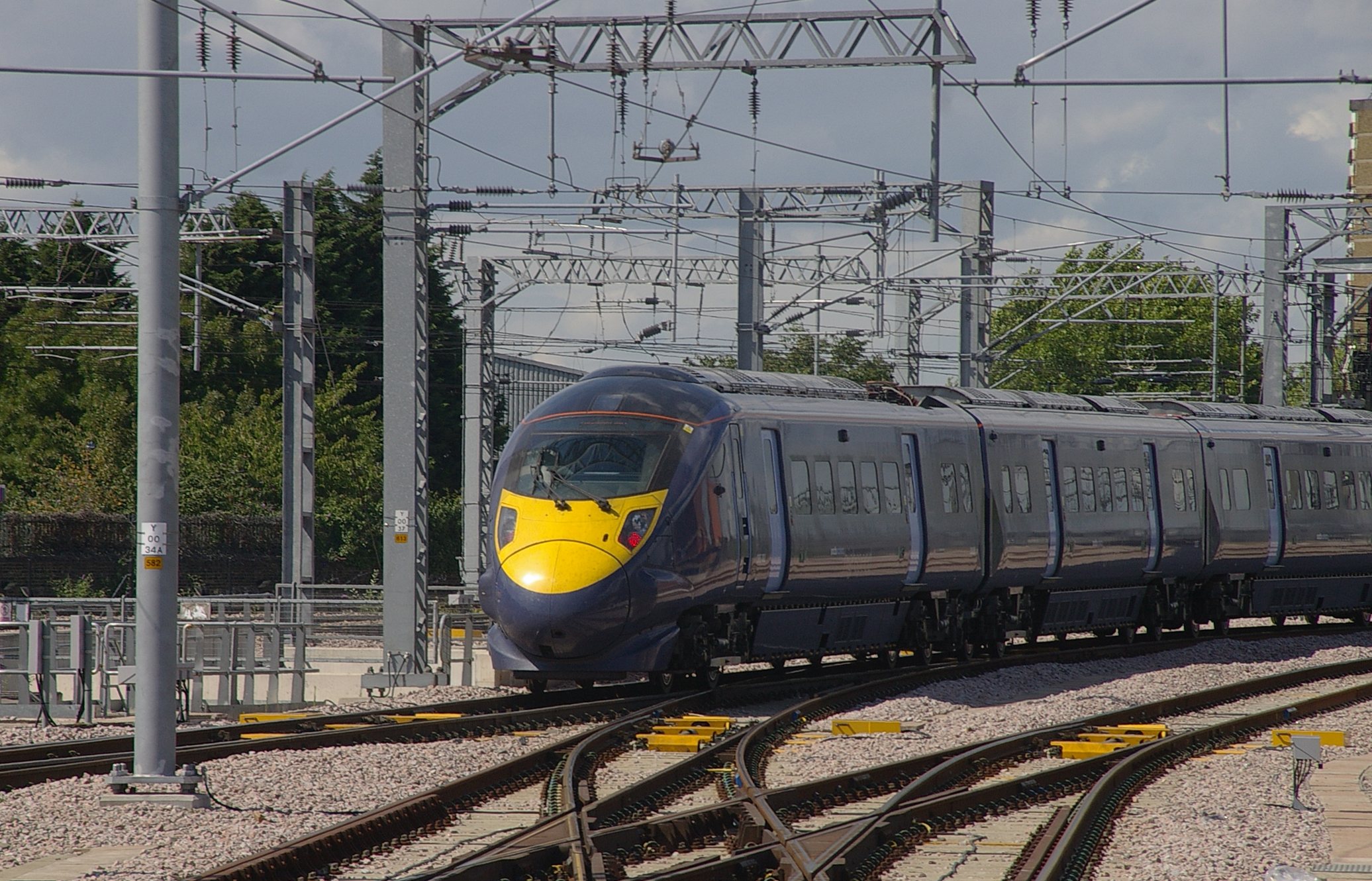
Train departing from London St Pancras. The station was constructed by the Midland Railway (MR) and is one of London's main domestic and international transport hubs providing both commuter rail and high-speed rail services across England.

The Department for Transport is the government body responsible for overseeing transport in England. The department is run by the Secretary of State for Transport. The transport and storage industry added a gross value of £59,179 million to the UK economy in 2011 and the telecommunication industry added a gross value of £25,098 million in the same year.

England has a dense and modern transportation infrastructure. There are many motorways in England, and many other trunk roads, such as the A1 Great North Road, which runs through eastern England from London to Newcastle (much of this section is motorway) and onward to the Scottish border. The longest motorway in England is the M6, from Rugby through the North West up to the Anglo-Scottish border, a distance of 232 miles (373 km). Other major routes include: the M1 from London to Leeds, the M25 which encircles London, the M60 which encircles Manchester, the M4 from London to South Wales, the M62 from Liverpool via Manchester to East Yorkshire, and the M5 from Birmingham to Bristol and the South West.

Figures from the Department for Transport show in 2018 people made 4.8 billion local bus passenger journeys in England, 58% of all public transport journeys. There were 1.8 billion rail passenger journeys in England. Light rail and tram travel also continued to grow, to the highest level (0.3 million journeys) since comparable records began in 1983. Rail travel tends to be used for longer journeys. Over half (57%) of all trips by rail are for either commuting or business purposes. On average, people made 48 trips by bus and travelled 441 kilometres compared to 22 trips and 992 kilometres by rail in 2018. In 2018/19, there was £18.1bn of public expenditure on railways, an increase of 12% (£1.9bn).

Bus transport across the country is widespread; major companies include Arriva, FirstGroup, Go-Ahead Group, Mobico Group, Rotala and Stagecoach Group. The red double-decker buses in London have become a symbol of England. Rail transport in England is the oldest in the world: passenger railways originated in England in 1825. Much of Britain's 10,000 miles (16,000 km) of rail network lies in England, covering the country fairly extensively. These lines are mostly standard gauge (single, double or quadruple track) though there are also a few narrow gauge lines. There is rail transport access to France and Belgium through an undersea rail link, the Channel Tunnel, which was completed in 1994.

During the age of steam locomotion, the economy in England strove to develop reliable technology for powering high-speed rail services between major cities. High-speed rail in England is provided on five upgraded railway lines running at top speeds of 125 mph (200 km/h) and one purpose-built high-speed line reaching 186 mph (300 km/h). Trains currently travel at 125 mph (200 km/h) on the East Coast Main Line, Great Western Main Line, Midland Main Line, parts of the Cross Country Route, and the West Coast Main Line. High Speed 1 (HS1) line connects London to the Channel Tunnel, with international Eurostar services running from St Pancras International to cities in France, Belgium, and the Netherlands at 186 mph (300 km/h). HS1 line was finished on time and under budget. The line is also used by high-speed commuter services from Kent to the capital. The CTRL project saw new bridges and tunnels built, with a combined length nearly as long as the Channel Tunnel itself, and significant archaeological research undertaken. In 2002, the CTRL project was awarded the Major Project Award at the British Construction Industry Awards. Since 2019 construction has been ongoing on a major new purpose-built high-speed rail line, High Speed 2 (HS2) which will link London with Birmingham at 224 mph (360 km/h) and reduce journey times to Scotland.

Government-backed plans to provide east–west high-speed services between cities in the North of England are also in development, as part of the Northern Powerhouse Rail project to boost the economic activity of the North. In June 2014, the Chancellor of the Exchequer proposed a high speed rail link High Speed 3 (HS3) between Liverpool and Newcastle, Sheffield and Hull. The line would utilise the existing route between Liverpool and Newcastle and Hull, and a new route from to Sheffield will follow the same route to Manchester Victoria, and then a new line from Victoria to Sheffield, with additional tunnels and other infrastructure. In July 2019 the Prime Minister announced a high-speed Leeds to Manchester route.

Great British Railways is a planned state-owned public body that will oversee rail transport in Great Britain. The Office of Rail and Road is responsible for the economic regulation of England's railways. England has extensive domestic and international aviation links. The largest airport is Heathrow, which is the world's busiest airport measured by number of international passengers. Other large airports include Gatwick, Manchester, Stansted, Luton and Birmingham.

=== Education ===
In 2007/08 higher education institutions in the UK had a total income of £23 billion and employed a total of 169,995 staff. In 2007/08 there were 2,306,000 higher education students in the UK with 1,922,180 studying in England.

English higher education has a strong international reputation, with over half of international students citing this as one of the main factors in deciding to study in the UK (compared to 22 percent of international students studying in Canada, 21 percent in Australia and 15 percent in the US). In specific subject rankings, English universities have performed well with a quarter of all top rankings taken by English universities in world rankings. The University of Oxford is rated top in most subjects among English universities, with the Royal College of Art first in the world for art and design, the Institute of Education, part of University College London, for education, University of Sussex for development studies and Loughborough University for sports-related subjects.

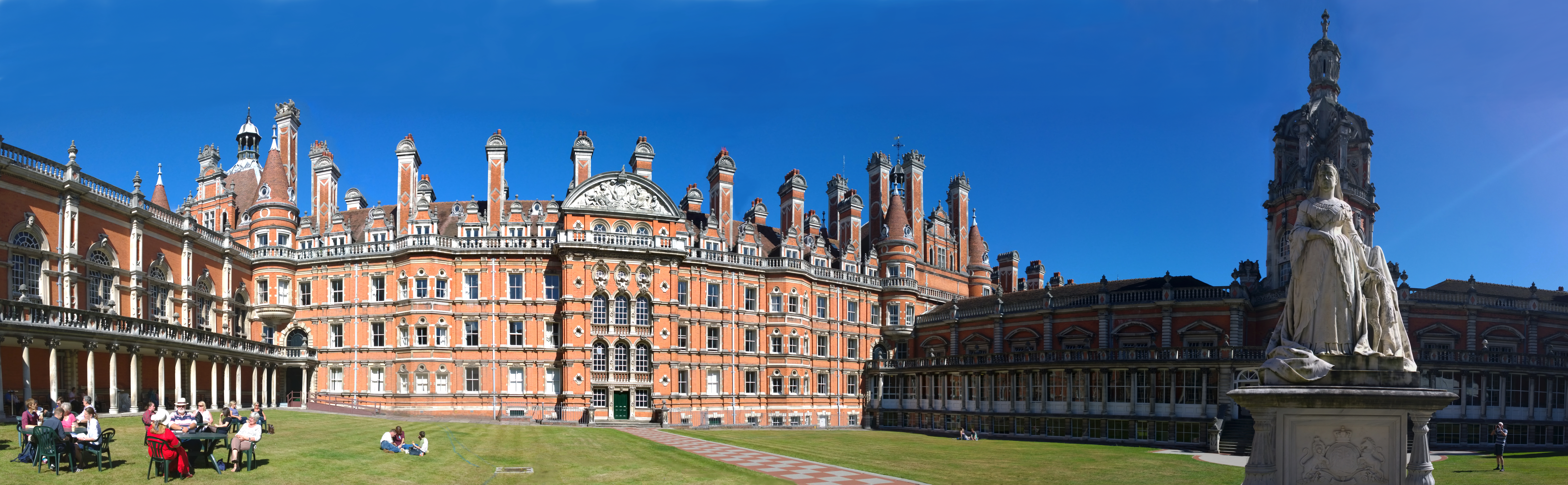
Royal Holloway, University of London (RHUL) is a public research university and a constituent college of the federal University of London. It has six schools, 21 academic departments and approximately 10,500 undergraduate and postgraduate students.

England's universities include some of the highest-ranked universities in the world; University of Cambridge, University of Oxford, Imperial College London, University College London and King's College London are all ranked in the global top 30 in the QS World University Rankings. The London School of Economics has been described as the world's leading social science institution for both teaching and research. The London Business School is considered one of the world's leading business schools and in 2010 its MBA programme was ranked best in the world by the Financial Times.

The University of Westminster achieved internationally excellent status for most of their work, ranking second for communications, cultural and media studies research, sixth for art and design research, in addition to the university performing strongly in architecture and the built environment, and geography and environmental studies. University of Manchester, University of Bristol, University of Liverpool and University of Birmingham are other English universities in global rankings.

The Department for Education is the government department responsible for issues affecting people in England up to the age of 19, including education. State-run and state-funded schools are attended by approximately 93% of English schoolchildren. Education is the responsibility of the Secretary of State for Education. Children who are between the ages of 3 and 5 attend nursery or an Early Years Foundation Stage reception unit within a primary school. Children between the ages of 5 and 11 attend primary school, and secondary school is attended by those aged between 11 and 16. State-funded schools are obliged by law to teach the National Curriculum.

The Programme for International Student Assessment coordinated by the OECD currently ranks the overall knowledge and skills of British 15-year-olds as 13th in the world in reading literacy, mathematics, and science with the average British student scoring 503.7, compared with the OECD average of 493. Out of the United Kingdom nations, England performed the strongest.

Further education colleges and sixth form colleges often form part of a secondary school site. Further education covers a wide curriculum of apprenticeships like BTEC Awards and NVQs. T Levels are apprenticeship based qualifications in England developed in collaboration with employers and businesses so that the content meets the needs of industry and prepares students for the labour market. Pupils gain a broad knowledge; with skills and behaviours necessary for employment in an occupation or industry related to their field of study, an opportunity to develop specialist technical skills relevant to at least one occupation, and the relevant English, Maths, Science and Digital skills. The pathways include:

- Agriculture, Environmental and Animal Care
- Business and Administrative
- Catering and Hospitality
- Childcare and Education
- Construction
- Creative and Design
- Digital
- Engineering and Manufacturing
- Hair and Beauty
- Health and Science
- Legal, Finance and Accounting
- Protective Services
- Sales, Marketing and Procurement
- Social Care
- Transport and Logistics

=== Healthcare ===
The National Health Service (NHS), is the publicly funded healthcare system responsible for providing the majority of healthcare in the country. The NHS began on 5 July 1948, putting into effect the provisions of the National Health Service Act 1946. It was based on the findings of the Beveridge Report, prepared by economist and social reformer William Beveridge. The NHS is largely funded from general taxation including National Insurance payments, and it provides most of its services free at the point of use. The government department responsible for the NHS is the Department of Health and Social Care, headed by the Secretary of State for Health and Social Care.

The average life expectancy of people in England is 77.5 years for males and 81.7 years for females, the highest of the four countries of the United Kingdom. The South of England has a higher life expectancy than the North, however, regional differences do seem to be slowly narrowing: between 1991–1993 and 2012–2014, life expectancy in the North East increased by 6.0 years and in the North West by 5.8 years, the fastest increase in any region outside London, and the gap between life expectancy in the North East and South East is now 2.5 years, down from 2.9 in 1993. The NHS in England is by far the largest of the four parts and had a turnover of £92.5 billion in 2008.

=== Creative industries ===
The creative industries accounted for 5.9% of the UK's GVA in 2023, having grown by 43.6% over a decade. Key areas include London and the North West of England, which are the two largest creative industry clusters in Europe. According to the British Fashion Council, the fashion industry's contribution to the economy in 2014 is £26 billion, up from £21 billion in 2009. London is one of the world's leading fashion capitals.

England is also home to the world's largest advertising company, WPP.

The Department for Culture, Media and Sport, headed by the headed by the Secretary of State for Culture, Media and Sport is the department with responsibility for culture and sport in England, and building of the digital economy and creative industries. It also has responsibility for the tourism and leisure. The Department for Culture, Media and Sport definition recognises ten creative sectors, namely:

- Advertising and marketing
- Architecture
- Crafts
- Design: product, graphic and fashion design
- Film, TV productions, TV, video, radio and photography
- IT, software and computer services
- Publishing
- Copyright, patent, trademarks
- Museums, galleries and libraries
- Music, performing and visual arts

London dominates the media sector in England: national newspapers and television and radio are largely based there, although Manchester is also a significant national media centre. The University of Salford also has a media campus and research center based at MediaCity. The UK publishing sector, including books, directories and databases, journals, magazines and business media, newspapers and news agencies, has a combined turnover of around £20 billion and employs around 167,000 people.

The Creative Industries Federation is a national organisation for England's creative industries, cultural education and arts. It advocates for the sector, aiming to ensure that the creative industries are central to political, economic and social decision making. Through this advocacy and by leveraging the combined influence of its 1,000+ members across all creative sectors, the Federation further seeks to secure the investment required to retain the creative industries' position as the fastest growing sector of the national economy, currently worth £111.7bn.

== Currency and taxation ==
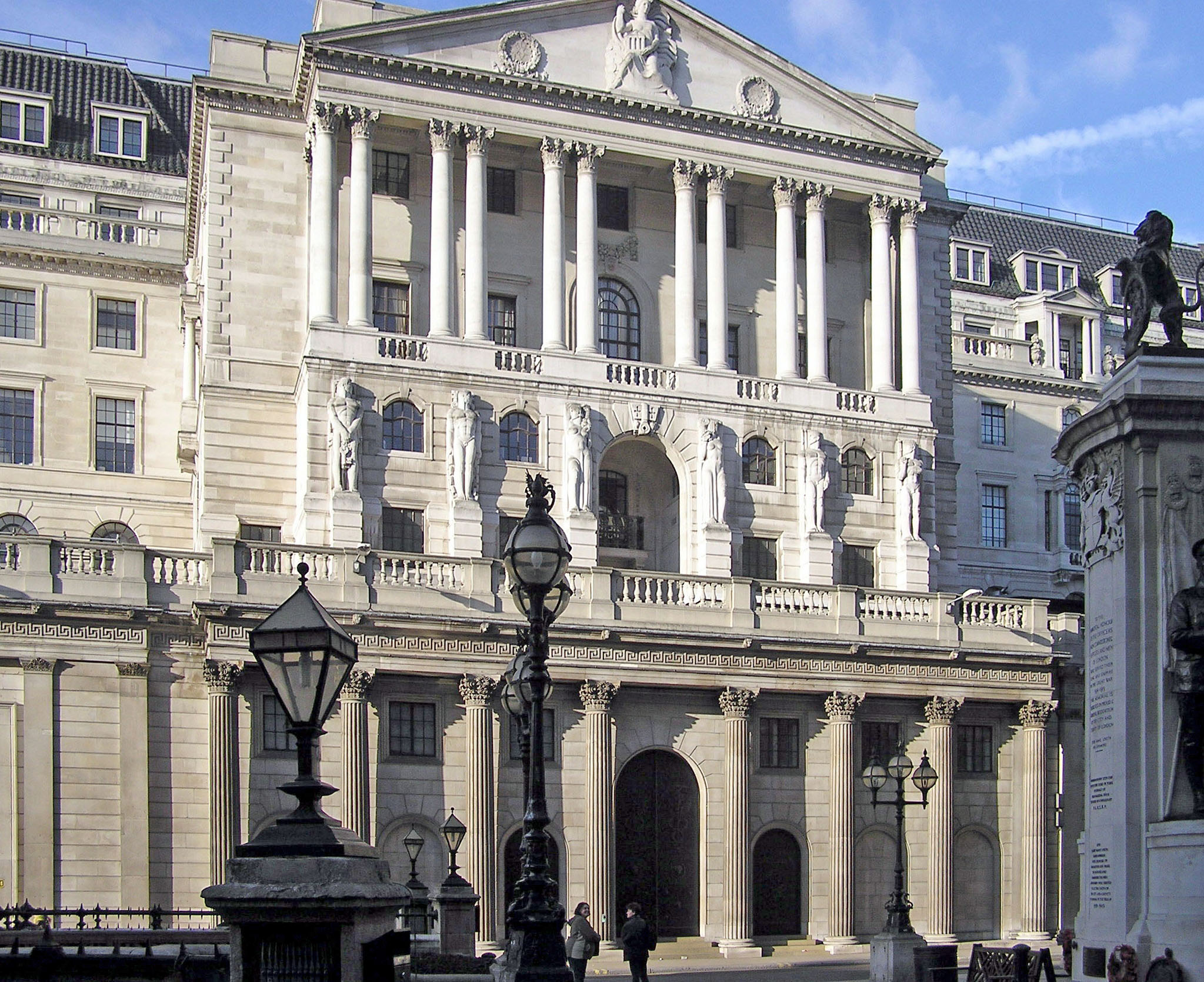
The Bank of England is the central bank of the United Kingdom and the model on which most modern central banks have been based.

England uses the pound sterling which is the world's oldest currency that is still in use and that has been in continuous use. It is currently the fourth most-traded currency in the foreign exchange market and is the world's fourth-largest reserve currency (after the United States dollar, euro, and yen). London is the world capital for foreign exchange trading, with a global market share of 38.1% in 2022 of the daily $7.5 trillion global turnover. Since 1997 the Bank of England's Monetary Policy Committee, headed by the Governor of the Bank of England, has been responsible for setting interest rates at the level necessary to achieve the overall inflation target for the economy that is set by the Chancellor each year.

Taxation in England involves payments to at least three different levels of government: central government (His Majesty's Revenue and Customs) and local government. Central government revenues come primarily from income tax, National Insurance contributions, value added tax, corporation tax and fuel duty. Local government revenues come primarily from grants from central government funds, business rates in England, Council Tax and increasingly from fees and charges such as those for on-street parking. In the fiscal year 2014–15, total government revenue was forecast to be £648 billion, or 37.7 per cent of GDP, with net taxes and National Insurance contributions standing at £606 billion. Business rates were introduced in England in 1990 and are a modernised version of a system of rating that dates back to the Poor Relief Act 1601.

The Budget of His Majesty's Government is an annual budget set by HM Treasury for the following financial year, with the revenues to be gathered by HM Revenue and Customs and the expenditures of the public sector, in compliance with government policy. The budget is one of two statements given by the Chancellor of the Exchequer, with the Spring Statement being given the following year. Budgets are usually set once every year and are announced in the House of Commons by the Chancellor of the Exchequer. Since autumn 2017 the budget typically takes place in the Autumn in order to give notice of tax changes well before the start of each fiscal year.

== Regions and cities ==
Manchester is considered to be a 'beta global city', rated as the second most globally influential city in England after London. The region is now an economic knowledge-led centre, with research and enterprise clustered around the University of Manchester, where research ranked as the third most powerful in the UK behind Cambridge and Oxford. Typical industry areas include digital and creative, financial, legal and business services, biotechnology, advanced manufacturing, environmental technologies, tourism, global sports brands, media and real estate. The city is also a key location for many foreign owned companies and headquarters, and almost half of the Northwest's top 500 businesses. Along with London, Manchester featured in the top 30 cities in the world for investment, and of the top 30, Manchester was 12th for the highest proportion of urban economy derived from financial and business services. Manchester City Council also plays a uniquely active role in business, where it owns key infrastructures such as bus services.

The economy in Liverpool is dominated by service sector industries, both public and private. In 2007, over 60% of all employment in the city was in the public administration, education, health, banking, finance and insurance sectors. Public administration, education and health are combined, the single largest employment sector within Liverpool's economy, accounting for approximately 40% of all jobs in the city. The level of employment in these sectors remains higher than the average for the other core cities of England. The banking, finance and insurance sectors are one of the fastest growing areas of Liverpool's economy with a 5.3% increase in jobs in these areas 2006/07. Major private sector service industry concerns have also invested in Liverpool especially the financial services sector with Barclays, JPMorgan, Alliance & Leicester, Royal Bank of Scotland Group and the Bank of Ireland either opening or expanding their sites, a number of major call centres have opened in recent years too and the professional advice sector.

Birmingham is an important manufacturing and engineering centre, employing over 100,000 people in the industry and contributing billions of pounds to England's economy. Research at the University of Birmingham, both theoretical and practical has contributed to the success of the city and the West Midlands region and had worldwide impact for more than a century. The university ranks as high as 10th in the UK according to the QS World University Rankings. Scientific research including research into nano technology at the University of Birmingham, is expanding in the city and will possibly play a part in the city's economic future. In 2011, Birmingham's financial and insurance services industry was worth £2.46 billion, the 4th largest in the United Kingdom. Birmingham has the two largest sets of barrister's chambers in the country; a local law society; 50 major property firms and one of Europe's largest insurance markets.

Leeds is the most diverse economy of all of England's main employment centres and has seen the fastest rate of private-sector jobs growth of any UK city and has the highest ratio of public to private sector jobs of all the core cities of England. Leeds has the third-largest jobs total by local authority area with 480,000 in employment and self-employment at the beginning of 2015. Leeds is the largest legal and financial centre in England outside of London. Its financial and insurance services industry was worth £2.1 billion, with more than 30 national and international banks located in the city. Leeds has nearly 1,800 companies engaged in a diverse range of manufacturing activities, including specialised engineering, print, food and drink manufacture, chemicals and medical technology. Both the University of Leeds and Leeds Metropolitan University have established business schools, their presence being supported by businesses in the city.

The economy in Bristol has long connections with the sea and its ports. In the 20th century aeronautics played an important role in the economy, and the city still plays a role in the manufacture of aircraft. Bristol was the first UK city to be named European Green Capital. Its modern economy is built on the creative media, technology, electronics and aerospace industries. Bristol is also a tourist destination, and has significant media, information technology and financial services sectors. Reports released in 2018 showed that the city is growing exponentially with a projected 2.3 percent annual growth rate.

In 2008, Sheffield ranked among the top 10 cities in the UK as a business location, and aims to regenerate itself as a modern technology and sports based city. Sheffield was the first National City of Sport, with a range of high quality facilities. Sheffield has an international reputation for metallurgy and steel-making. It was this industry that established it as one of England's main industrial cities during the 18th, 19th and 20th centuries. High technology businesses such Fluent, Inc. have chosen Sheffield as the centre for their international operations and so has Jennic, specialists in semiconductor design for the home automation, commercial building automation, and industrial process monitoring and control markets. The University of Sheffield supports the growth of technology transfer in the Sheffield City Region through the innovation centers which houses enterprises as well as startup companies working in similar areas alongside the University of Sheffield. Organised by the Sheffield Chamber of Commerce and Industry, the Sheffield Business Awards is an awards ceremony held on an annual basis to help highlight and promote business and industry in Sheffield and boost the economy of the region.

Newcastle played a major role during the 19th-century Industrial Revolution, and was a leading centre for coal mining, shipbuilding, engineering, munitions and manufacturing. Heavy industries in Newcastle declined in the second half of the 20th century; with office, service and retail employment now becoming the city's staples. Newcastle is the commercial, educational and the cultural hub of North East England. Newcastle's economy contributes around £13 billion to the UK GVA. This figure is mostly produced by corporate activity in Newcastle's Central Business District, located in the centre of the city (bounded by the Haymarket, Central Station and the Quayside areas). The city's thriving nightlife is estimated to be worth £340 million per year, and consequently is seen as a major contributor to Newcastle's economy. The UK's first biotechnology village, the Centre for Life, is located by Central Station. The village is the first step in the City Council's plans to transform Newcastle into a science city.

== Regional variation ==
The strength of the English economy varies between regions. The following table shows the total GVA (gross value added) and GVA per capita of each of the nine English regions.

GVA in the regions of England (2021)
Rank	Region	GVA per capita	GVA	% of English GVA
1.	London	£55,412	£487 billion	27.7%
2.	South East	£32,443	£302 billion	17.1%
3.	North West	£26,411	£196 billion	11.1%
4.	East of England	£26,995	£171 billion	9.7%
5.	South West	£26,219	£150 billion	8.5%
6.	West Midlands	£24,530	£146 billion	8.3%
7.	Yorkshire and the Humber	£24,330	£133 billion	7.6%
8.	East Midlands	£24,261	£118 billion	6.7%
9.	North East	£21,340	£56 billion	3.2%
	England	£31,138	£1,760 billion	100%

== See also ==
- Economy of Europe
- Economy of Northern Ireland
- Economy of Scotland
- Economy of Wales
- Economy of the United Kingdom
- List of country subdivisions by GDP over USD 100 billions
