= Twinkle =

Twinkle may refer to:

- Twinkling, the variation of brightness of distant objects

== People ==
- Twinkle (singer) (1948–2015), born Lynn Annette Ripley, English singer-songwriter
- Twinkle Bajpai, Indian singer, television and film actress
- Twinkle Borge (born 1971), Hawaiian activist
- Twinkle Andress Cavanaugh, president of the Alabama Public Service Commission since 2013
- Twinkle Khanna (born 1973), Indian author and actress

== Science and technology ==
- Twinkle (software), Qt-based VoIP soft phone for Linux
- TWINKLE, a hypothetical integer factorization device
- Twinkle (protein), a protein coded by a gene also called TWNK, C10orf2 or PEO1

== Entertainment ==
- Twinkle (comic), a British comic book, published 1968–1999
- Twinkle (book), by Katharine Holabird
- Twinkle, a character in the video game Puzzle Bobble 3 (a.k.a. Bust-a-Move 99)
- Twinkle, a fictional character in Higglytown Heroes
- Twinkle, one of the cousins from We Love Katamari and Me & My Katamari
- Twinkle, a character in Diana Wynne Jones's novel House of Many Ways
- Twinkle, a recurring fictional character in the British sitcom dinnerladies
- Twinkle, a sword carried by R. A. Salvatore's character Drizzt Do'Urden
- Twinkles, a cartoon elephant appearing in episodes of King Leonardo and His Short Subjects
- Cure Twinkle, a character in Go! Princess PreCure

== Music ==
- Twinkle (EP), EP by Girls' Generation subunit TaeTiSeo, and the title song
- "Twinkle", a pop song by Kumi Koda and Show Luo
- "Twinkle", a 1981 single by Earl Klugh
- "Twinkle", a 1996 single by Whipping Boy (Irish band)
- "Twinkle", a song by Purple Kiss on Hide & Seek
- "Twinkle Song", a song on Miley Cyrus & Her Dead Petz
- Twinkle, Twinkle, Little Star, popular English lullaby

== Other ==
- Twinkles, an Occupy movement hand signal
- Twinkl, a specialist digital education publisher

== See also ==
- Twinkle Twinkle (disambiguation)
- Twinkle Stars, a manga
- Twinkle Star Sprites, a video game
- Twinkleshine, a My Little Pony
- Tinkle, an indian magazine for kids
