= Twinkle Twinkle =

Twinkle Twinkle may refer to:

- My Heart Twinkle Twinkle, a 2015 South Korean television series
- Twinkle, Twinkle, Little Star, a popular English lullaby
  - Twinkle, Twinkle, Little Star (Pinkney book)
  - Twinkle, Twinkle, Little Bat, an Alice's Adventures in Wonderland song based on Twinkle, Twinkle, Little Star
- Twinkle Twinkle (TV series), a South Korean television series
- "Twinkle Twinkle" (Secret song), a 2012 song by Welcome to SECRET time
- "Twinkle Twinkle", a song by Ranjith from the 2012 Indian film Sudigadu
- Twinkle, Twinkle Lucky Star, a 1987 song by Merle Haggard
- "Twinkle Twinkle", an episode of the TV series Pocoyo

== See also ==
- Twinkle (disambiguation)
