= Sheffield Business Awards =

Annual event in Sheffield, England

The Sheffield Business Awards is an annual event, held in Sheffield to recognise and reward Sheffield City region business success.

== Overview ==
The awards are organised by the Sheffield Star and the Sheffield Chamber of Commerce and Industry as the city region's premier showcase of enterprise.

Despite the name, the Sheffield Business Awards allows nominations for all businesses who are situated in the 'S' postcode area. This allows businesses in some areas of Rotherham, Barnsley and Doncaster to take part in the event.

Businesses can nominate themselves or be nominated for one or more of several categories which are then judged by a panel of independent business leaders, Sheffield Chamber of Commerce representatives and representatives from the sponsoring organisations. The Outstanding Business of the Year Award is decided from all short-listed companies excluding Business Person of the Year and Young Business Person of the Year.

== The Ceremony ==
Each year a ceremony is held around the first week of December at Ponds Forge International Sports Centre. The event usually comprises a three course meal where several awards are presented between each course, culminating in the final award presented to the 'Outstanding Business of the Year'.

The 2018 ceremony was hosted by BBC Breakfast's Dan Walker (broadcaster).

The 2012 ceremony was hosted by Paul Zenon with local magician Steve Faulkner.

The 2011 ceremony was again hosted by comedian and impressionist Jon Culshaw, back by popular demand.

The 2010 ceremony was hosted by comedian and impressionist Jon Culshaw. The event was planned for 2 December, but unfortunately due to severe weather conditions, the awards were postponed until 13 January 2011.

The 2009 ceremony was hosted by Paul Ross on 3 December.

The 2008 ceremony was hosted by Jon Culshaw and held on 4 December 2008.

== Award Categories & 2018 Winners ==
- Outstanding Business of the Year:Twinkl Educational Publishing
- Best Contribution to Sheffield Visitor Experience:Sheffield Theatres
- Business Person of the Year, sponsored by Shorts Chartered Accountants: David Capper – Westfield Health
- Employer of the Year, sponsored by The Sheffield College: Twinkl Educational Publishing
- Excellence in Corporate, Social and Environmental Responsibility:Sheffield Sustainable Kitchens
- Excellence in International Trade: Twinkl Educational Publishing
- Excellence in Manufacturing: MGB Plastics
- Excellence in Professional Services:Shorts Chartered Accountants
- High Growth Business of the Year: LabLogic Group Holdings Ltd
- Large Business of the Year:Bluetree Group
- SME of the Year:Fernite of Sheffield Ltd
- Special Recognition Award:Gordon Bridge
- The Innovation Award:SleepCogni
- The Marketing and Communications Award: VOW Europe Ltd.
- The Sheffield Universities Entrepreneurship Award:Tutorful

== Award Categories & 2013 Winners ==
- Young Business Person of the Year Award: Oliver Bryssau (Origin Broadband)

== Award Categories & 2010 Winners ==
- The Sheffield Chamber of Commerce & Industry Outstanding Business of the Year:George Robson & Co (Conveyors) Limited
- The Sheffield Enterprise Agency Enterprise Award:Future Life Wealth Management
- The HSBC Excellence in International Trade Award:Hydra Mining
- The Sheffield City Council Young Business Person of the Year Award:Tristan Cowell, IC Innovations
- The Digital Region Broadband Creative & Digital Industries Innovation:Zoo Digital
- The SYGBC Environmental Impact Award:Office Friendly Dealer Association Limited
- The Napoleons Casino & Restaurant, Ecclesall Road Excellence in Retail Services Award:The Girl with the Golden Cup
- The Pinder Bros Ltd Sheffield Champion Award:Thetford Ltd
- The Kier Sheffield Community Impact Award:Bag It Don't Bin It
- The Kennedy's Business Person of the Year Award:Kevin Mannion of Geo Robson & Co (Conveyors) Ltd
- The Wake Smith Excellence in Manufacturing Award:Geo Robson & Co (Conveyors)
- The Irwin Mitchell Excellence in Customer Service Award:George Robson & Co (Conveyors) Limited
- The Business Advantage Excellence in Skills Award:Barlow Group
- The NHS Sheffield Healthy Business Award:Sheffield International Venues Ltd
- The Sports & Leisure Business Forum Excellence in Sports Services Award:Sheffield International Venues

== Award Categories & 2009 Winners ==
- The Amey Environmental Impact Award: Office Friendly Dealer Association
- The ask4 Excellence in Retail Services Award: Kitlocker.com
- The BiG Business Enterprise Award: AG Wind Power
- The Business Link Yorkshire Creative & Digital Industries Innovation Award: ZOO Digital Group plc
- The Creative Sheffield, Sheffield Champion Award: DavyMarkham Ltd
- The Freeman College Community Impact Award: The United Initiative
- The Irwin Mitchell Excellence in Customer Service Award: Sheffield International Venues
- The NHS Sheffield Healthy Business Award: Specsavers Opticians @ Crystal Peaks
- The City Strategy Excellence in Skills Award: Insight Direct UK
- The UK Trade & Investment Excellence in International Trade Award: MTL Group Ltd
- The Wake Smith Excellence in Manufacturing Award: MTL Group Ltd
- The Williams Fasteners Excellence in Sports Services Award: Sheffield United PLC
- The Sheffield Hallam University Young Business Person of the Year Award: Andrew Seaton from Resolve IT Solutions Ltd
- The Rensburg Sheppards Business Person of the Year Award: Kevin Parkin of DavyMarkham Ltd
- The Barclays Commercial Bank Outstanding Business of the Year Award: DavyMarkham Ltd

== Award Categories & 2008 Winners ==
The 2008 ceremony saw an updated structure to the award categories. Each category was sponsored by an independent business or organisation and names of the awards were changed, with the addition of several extra categories and extra emphasis given to the main award for 'Outstanding Business of the Year'. The categories and winners of the 2008 awards were:

- Outstanding Business of The Year: MyJobGroup Ltd
- The "Sheffield Champion" Award: Sheffield International Documentary Festival Ltd
- The Creative & Digital Industries Innovation Award: MyJobGroup Ltd
- The Excellence in International Trade Award: DavyMarkham Limited
- The Excellence in Skills Award: Williams Brothers (Sheffield) Ltd
- The Excellence in Customer Service Award: Acorn Industrial Services Ltd
- The Community Impact Award: Kier Sheffield
- The Excellence in Retail Services Award: Ferndale Garden Centre
- The Business Person of the Year Award: Freeman College's David Heugh
- The Manufacturing Award: DavyMarkham Limited
- The Enterprise Award: Ecotek UK Ltd
- The Environmental award: VeryPC
- The Young Business Person of the Year Award: Ladyzone's Jamie Cartwright
