= List of countries by engine exports =

The following is a list of countries by combustion engine exports. This list is based on Harmonised System 8408.

== International Trade Centre ==
Data is for 2024, in thousands of United States dollars and tons/units.

List of countries by engine exports (2024)
Country	Value exported (thousands USD)	Trade balance (thousands USD)	Quantity exported	
Country	Value exported (thousands USD)	Trade balance (thousands USD)	Value	Units
World	46,147,610	−1,467,581	–	–
United States	7,965,767	1,712,800	462,039	Units
Germany	5,748,899	2,140,847	271,355	Tons
United Kingdom	4,131,419	3,052,468	223,332	Tons
Japan	3,141,804	2,449,751	284,608	Tons
Sweden	2,771,677	2,569,080	183,623	Tons
France	2,761,475	1,018,953	199,929	Tons
China	2,718,511	−608,753	480,102	Tons
Poland	2,068,035	709,879	117,223	Tons
Mexico	1,968,636	−4,665,896	–	–
Italy	1,935,593	840,440	113,168	Tons
South Korea	1,542,218	984,349	165,006	Tons
Thailand	1,437,931	498,511	–	–
Austria	1,409,995	973,910	45,419	Tons
India	1,286,880	694,245	405,840	Units
Hungary	1,201,264	1,096,324	–	–
Spain	826,545	−867,243	–	–
Finland	453,510	272,086	24,521	Tons
Netherlands	420,011	−386,345	23,943	Tons
Belgium	307,450	−694,972	21,601	Tons
Brazil	302,869	−739,081	21,620	Tons
Switzerland	265,336	201,293	10,509	Tons
Singapore	253,791	−82,314	283,868	Units
South Africa	138,398	−171,838	42,285	Units
Canada	112,179	−1,354,030	8,470	Units
Slovakia	101,557	−220,197	3,151	Tons
Denmark	101,390	47,757	2,361	Tons
Turkey	89,869	−2,604,067	3,970	Tons
Australia	72,375	−565,743	790,325	Units
Indonesia	69,880	−708,543	4,365	Tons
Argentina	64,953	−620,938	4,608	Tons
Chile	42,741	−150,539	30,733	Units
United Arab Emirates	40,188	−454,055	–	–
Czech Republic	37,221	−944,951	1,712	Tons
Hong Kong	36,460	−19,684	1,376	Units
Russia	28,146	−427,728	–	–
Norway	25,896	−75,672	2,736	Tons
Malaysia	21,610	−274,876	–	–
Romania	16,009	−281,450	2,038	Tons
Kyrgyzstan	15,230	−27,705	700	Tons
Kazakhstan	13,676	−164,535	1,692	Tons
New Zealand	13,658	−19,672	14,122	Tons
Slovenia	12,699	−5,406	197	Tons
Zambia	12,280	−27,590	755	Tons
Saudi Arabia	11,172	−298,907	2,707	Tons
Lithuania	10,988	836	10,344	Tons
Croatia	10,758	−31,780	640	Tons
Portugal	10,724	−292,503	1,359	Tons
Taiwan	10,297	−232,426	4,693	Tons
Ireland	9,231	−75,033	1,545	Tons
Colombia	7,978	−36,017	580	Tons
Tunisia	6,296	−16,912	428	Tons
Belarus	6,184	−156,697	823	Tons
Serbia	6,119	−11,193	481	Tons
Bulgaria	5,666	−7,263	1,102	Tons
Brunei	4,570	4,170	106	Units
Peru	3,954	−91,612	601	Tons
Latvia	3,477	−5,940	181	Tons
Mozambique	3,406	−27,806	–	–
Morocco	3,109	−272,821	172	Tons
Panama	2,731	−6,910	629	Tons
Namibia	2,698	−15,606	155	Tons
Papua New Guinea	2,691	−24,361	–	–
Guyana	2,414	−5,165	18	Tons
Dominican Republic	2,055	−8,574	79	Tons
Albania	1,900	−1,435	17	Tons
Philippines	1,858	−96,190	111	Tons
Estonia	1,832	−5,784	1,017	Tons
Côte d'Ivoire	1,812	−9,942	172	Tons
Burkina Faso	1,786	−14,517	748	Tons
Suriname	1,380	−1,603	71	Tons
Senegal	1,359	−14,340	79	Tons
Greece	1,272	−30,166	165	Tons
Kuwait	1,254	−2,632	217	Tons
Botswana	1,248	−12,949	225	Tons
Angola	1,213	−13,390	221	Tons
Armenia	1,092	−1,520	186	Tons
Vietnam	963	−397,635	–	–
Bosnia and Herzegovina	776	−3,691	894	Tons
Uzbekistan	751	−71,896	38	Tons
Ukraine	645	−74,439	364	Tons
Malta	615	−519	31	Tons
Costa Rica	610	−4,880	37	Tons
Ghana	593	−95,740	–	–
Mongolia	571	−27,355	55	Tons
Guinea	570	−26,103	89	Tons
Jordan	518	−4,942	40	Tons
Eswatini	507	−28	–	–
Ecuador	507	−19,005	53	Tons
Lebanon	470	−79,669	33	Tons
Luxembourg	461	−2,829	32	Tons
Guatemala	395	−12,330	41	Tons
Nigeria	318	−85,668	384	Tons
New Caledonia	298	−308	–	–
Zimbabwe	298	−9,385	52	Tons
Azerbaijan	280	−16,492	40	Tons
DR Congo	271	−31,359	–	–
Lesotho	265	−658	28	Tons
Kenya	262	−9,476	15	Tons
Israel	255	−60,815	11	Tons
Cuba	246	−7,627	21	Tons
Fiji	241	−2,457	9	Units
Mali	236	−20,278	–	–
Montserrat	236	236	21	Units
Faroe Islands	235	−377	–	–
Bangladesh	234	−57,819	–	–
Trinidad and Tobago	234	−1,511	54	Tons
North Macedonia	220	−17,471	86	Tons
Cyprus	217	−1,381	15	Tons
Qatar	203	−5,781	–	–
Mauritania	184	−22,375	20	Tons
Georgia	184	−3,403	24	Tons
Pakistan	181	−14,679	4,122	Units
Curaçao	172	−612	10	Tons
Afghanistan	172	−5,639	–	–
Egypt	154	−68,954	7	Tons
Somalia	139	−1,134	2	Units
El Salvador	124	−3,512	14	Tons
Nicaragua	118	−4,900	27	Tons
Greenland	116	−440	23	Tons
Marshall Islands	102	3	8	Tons
Tanzania	101	−20,349	15	Tons
Oman	95	−6,068	72	Tons
Haiti	82	−308	0	Tons
Uruguay	76	−26,579	16	Tons
Togo	75	−1,050	2	Tons
Honduras	75	−5,958	12	Tons
Iceland	61	−5,444	13	Tons
Iran	57	−42,353	–	–
Uganda	51	−2,873	28	Tons
Tokelau	50	50	–	–
Algeria	47	−109,286	4	Tons
Moldova	45	−1,267	3	Tons
Bahrain	41	−2,829	–	–
Ethiopia	40	−4,304	1	Tons
Libya	39	−6,327	–	–
Mauritius	37	−2,252	4	Units
Cambodia	33	−27,180	5	Tons
Bahamas	32	−2,507	622	Units
Paraguay	32	−5,431	4	Tons
Sri Lanka	30	−7,409	–	–
Bolivia	26	−6,627	3	Tons
Gabon	26	−2,015	13	Tons
Montenegro	26	−814	12	Tons
Jamaica	15	−2,093	–	–
Belize	15	−1,133	1	Tons
Barbados	14	−661	1	Tons
Turks and Caicos Islands	13	−246	27	Tons
Sierra Leone	12	−2,763	10	Tons
Cameroon	12	−6,974	7	Tons
North Korea	12	12	12	Tons
Iraq	11	−30,772	40	Tons
Madagascar	9	−3,732	5	Tons
United States Minor Outlying Islands	9	−432	–	–
Gibraltar	7	−26	13	Tons
Palestine	6	−189	–	–
Cayman Islands	5	−135	–	–
Bermuda	5	−501	–	–
Liberia	4	−7,064	1	Units
Seychelles	3	−2,005	1	Tons
Saint Lucia	3	−55	–	–
Congo	3	−3,998	832	Tons
British Virgin Islands	3	−812	–	–
Venezuela	3	−9,657	–	–
Burundi	1	−752	1	Tons
Antigua and Barbuda	1	−132	1	Tons
Equatorial Guinea	1	−434	–	–
Saint Vincent and the Grenadines	1	−92	1	Units
Malawi	1	−2,088	2	Tons

== Observatory of Economic Complexity ==
List of countries by engine exports (2023)
Country	Trade value
United States	7,915,281,832
Germany	6,409,268,583
United Kingdom	4,403,531,022
Japan	4,149,046,789
Sweden	3,235,014,398
France	2,942,489,343
China	2,620,410,616
Poland	2,391,044,995
Italy	2,122,420,963
Mexico	1,883,490,585
India	1,801,399,485
Austria	1,526,601,801
South Korea	1,186,928,480
Thailand	1,130,179,011
Hungary	1,093,542,294
Spain	777,915,507
Finland	510,862,979
Netherlands	466,668,354
Brazil	401,398,934
Argentina	350,782,333
Switzerland	321,600,702
Slovakia	230,697,261
Belgium	163,571,213
South Africa	116,917,754
United Arab Emirates	105,911,172
Singapore	105,331,909
Turkey	100,756,808
Canada	99,017,874
Denmark	96,936,634
Czech Republic	69,318,958
Australia	57,969,270
Hong Kong	49,706,301
Indonesia	48,234,039
Russia	29,765,517
Chile	26,146,729
Norway	21,958,315
Malaysia	19,770,120
New Zealand	12,551,643
Kazakhstan	12,412,398
Lithuania	11,113,105
Morocco	10,002,936
Taiwan	9,071,061
Zambia	8,248,202
Ireland	7,621,468
Belarus	6,901,569
Romania	6,715,158
Croatia	6,700,703
Portugal	6,523,382
Slovenia	6,344,988
Colombia	5,407,435
Bahrain	5,003,844
Estonia	4,235,404
Greece	4,186,265
Serbia	4,154,347
Bulgaria	4,057,580
Mauritius	2,976,534
Saudi Arabia	2,894,045
Ukraine	2,812,209
Peru	2,755,546
Kyrgyzstan	2,747,536
Armenia	2,682,385
Latvia	2,182,913
Philippines	2,056,465
Senegal	1,948,066
Papua New Guinea	1,674,110
Israel	1,560,101
Namibia	1,554,835
Kuwait	1,540,120
Oman	1,398,238
Sri Lanka	1,338,498
Jordan	1,288,787
Tunisia	1,246,426
Burkina Faso	972,610
Suriname	949,380
Turkmenistan	904,010
Moldova	859,108
Panama	828,966
Guatemala	779,597
Bosnia and Herzegovina	734,747
Bolivia	721,265
Luxembourg	716,525
Vietnam	706,201
Egypt	648,646
New Caledonia	605,576
Ecuador	533,326
Dominican Republic	512,870
Qatar	472,233
Pakistan	462,683
Albania	458,211
Ghana	436,586
Kenya	379,288
Nigeria	371,437
Cuba	356,704
Brunei	342,356
Cote d'Ivoire	336,961
Afghanistan	310,891
Bangladesh	301,738
Lebanon	287,829
Botswana	282,463
Guinea	272,144
Uzbekistan	251,110
Cyprus	245,610
Tanzania	233,999
Lesotho	222,012
Iceland	218,445
Iran	215,059
Mongolia	198,832
Georgia	198,011
Mauritania	193,645
Curacao	190,021
North Macedonia	188,425
Malta	185,045
Guyana	164,637
Andorra	158,139
Marshall Islands	135,739
Mali	127,587
Benin	111,102
Nicaragua	110,695
Bahamas	98,672
Azerbaijan	93,254
French Polynesia	86,781
El Salvador	84,006
Tajikistan	80,512
Mozambique	79,142
Montenegro	77,921
Greenland	69,849
Honduras	62,548
Costa Rica	58,937
Angola	52,301
Ethiopia	47,452
Cayman Islands	45,069
Saint Vincent and the Grenadines	42,568
Jamaica	32,538
Gabon	30,836
North Korea	30,127
Paraguay	29,771
Laos	23,473
Trinidad and Tobago	20,954
Sao Tome and Principe	19,713
Uruguay	19,444
Zimbabwe	19,049
Niger	18,286
Eswatini	18,211
Fiji	17,232
Gibraltar	16,842
Antigua and Barbuda	15,838
DR Congo	15,064
Saint Martin	13,227
Niue	10,827
Cameroon	10,555
Comoros	10,497
Iraq	8,716
Togo	8,062
Uganda	6,111
Belize	5,803
Madagascar	5,576
Palestine	5,259
Barbados	4,041
Haiti	3,662
Malawi	3,242
Cambodia	2,724
South Sudan	2,720
Sierra Leone	2,615
Myanmar	2,460
Congo	2,130
Cape Verde	1,368
Solomon Islands	802
Algeria	316
American Samoa	191
Anguilla	160
Pitcairn Islands	155
Gambia	0
