= Twinkl =

England-based digital educational publisher

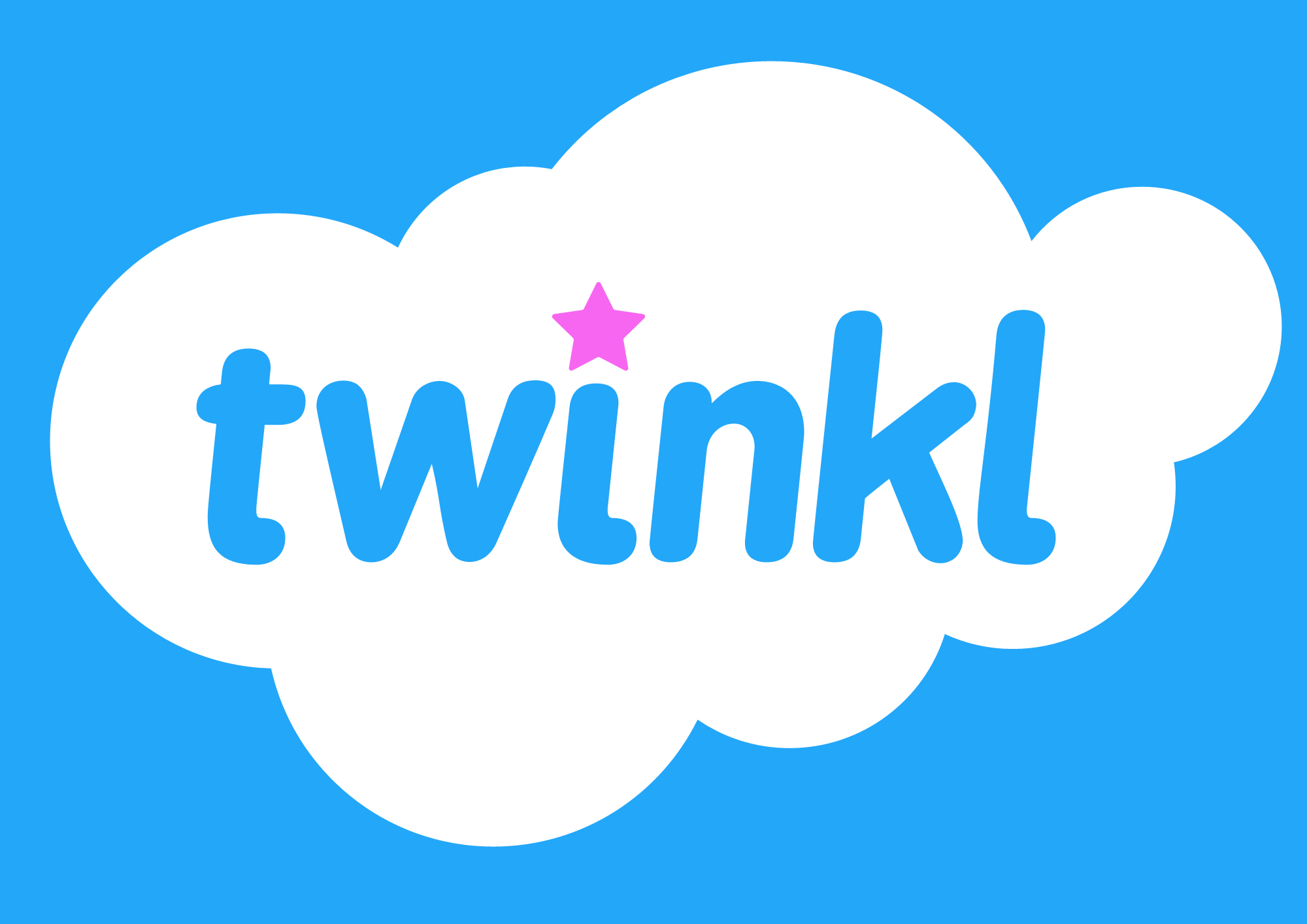
- Type: Private company
- Industry: Education
- Founded: February 2010; 16 years ago
- Founders: Jonathan Seaton, Andrew Seaton, Ben Walker and Susie Seaton
- Headquarters: Sheffield, England
- Area served: Worldwide
- Key people: Jonathan Seaton (CEO)
- Products: Educational resources, teacher planning materials, teacher assessment materials
- Revenue: £78,604,068 (2024)
- Number of employees: 1000+
- Website: twinkl.co.uk

Twinkl is a digital EdTech firm and educational publisher founded in 2010 and headquartered in Sheffield, England, producing teaching and educational materials. Twinkl was founded by Jonathan Seaton and Susie Seaton.

Driven by its mission to help those who teach, the company serves more than six million customers around the world, offering over 1.5 million resources via its website, which are created and checked by teachers.

Twinkl creates digital teaching materials for educators worldwide. This includes materials for primary schools, secondary schools, parents home educators, childminders, English as a second language, special educational needs and disabilities, adult education, and international markets.

Recently filed accounts for parent company Wild Peak Holdings Ltd show turnover of £98.9m was recorded in the year ending 30 April 2025, up from £79m in 2023/24.

== Recognition and achievements ==
In April 2018, Twinkl received The Queen's Award for Enterprise for the company's work in international trade. Twinkl was awarded a second Queen’s Award for Enterprise in 2020, for innovation.

Jonathan Seaton, co-founder and CEO of Twinkl was awarded a Member of the Order of the British Empire (MBE) for Twinkl’s services to Technology and Education during the Coronavirus pandemic in 2020.

== Coronavirus response ==
Twinkl offered all its resources for free to parents, teachers and carers globally for one month during the Coronavirus school closures.

The firm partnered with BBC Bitesize to supply educational materials to support home learning. It has partnered with BBC Children in Need to offer a range of free resources, supporting children and schools to fundraise for the charity. In June 2020, the firm partnered with BBC Studios to create a range of educational Doctor Who resources for primary school children. Twinkl collaborated with UEFA Champions League and their partner, Santander, to launch The Numbers Game Champions Challenge Cards, made available for free on the Twinkl website.

== Location ==
The company moved to its current headquarters in Sheffield, England in 2019. The company has over 710 staff in 15 locations around the world.

== TwinklHive ==
In 2019, Twinkl launched a startup accelerator, TwinklHive based in Sheffield, UK. TwinklHive launched a young entrepreneurship programme in 2020, offering investment and mentorship to young people who want to grow a digital business.

Natterhub, a social media platform and framework created for teachers to share with pupils, is part of TwinklHive. Founded by Manjit Sareen and Caroline Allams, the curriculum aimed platform is aimed at students aged 5 to 11 in the United Kingdom.

Another prominent company receiving investment from TwinklHive is Learning Ladders - a software for curriculum planning, portfolios, assessments, progress tracking, remote learning and family engagement.

Champion Health, a digital wellbeing platform, received investment from TwinklHive in 2020.
