= Economy of Sheffield =

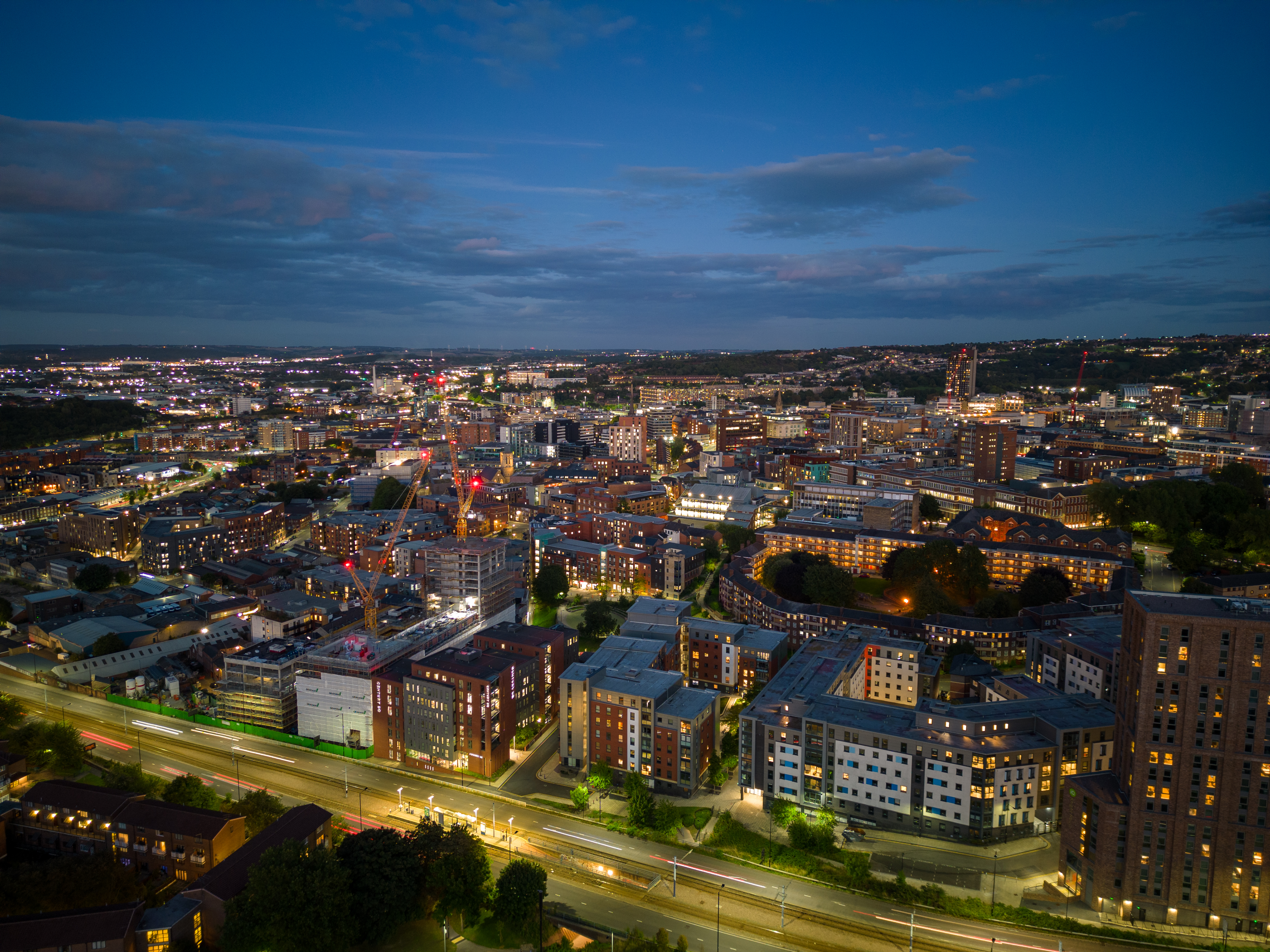
- Sheffield Central Business District

Statistics
- Population: 573,252 (2023)
- GDP: £19.1 billion (2023)
- GDP per capita: £33,234 (2023)

Sheffield is one of eleven British cities that make up the Core Cities Group. Sheffield aims to regenerate itself as a modern technology and sports based city. Sheffield has an international reputation for metallurgy and steel-making. It was this industry that established it as one of England's main industrial cities during the 18th, 19th and 20th centuries.

The largest employers are now all public sector: the two universities, NHS, and national and local government employees. Private fee-paying international students are also a major source (£120 million per year) of income to the local economy through the universities.

== Economic Indices ==
=== Quality of Life ===
- Time Out in 2022 and The Guardian in 2010 have mentioned Sheffield as the best place to live and work in the UK.
- The Sheffield Hallam Constituency in 2019 out of 543 parliamentary constituencies came as 536 least deprived, in 2025, 539 making the area one of the most affluent constituencies in England. The area is increasing its level of affluence.
- There are more than 250 parks, woodlands and gardens in the city, which are estimated to contain around 4.5 million trees.
- Sheffield was crowned the foodie capital of the UK in 2023 by Accor Hotels, of all UK cities.

== GVA ==
This is a chart of trend of regional gross value added (GVA) of Sheffield at current basic prices published (pp. 240–253) by Office for National Statistics with figures in millions of British Pounds Sterling.

Year	Regional Gross Value Added^{4}	Agriculture^{1}	Industry^{2}	Services^{3}
1995	4,971	9	1,579	3,383
2000	6,162	8	1,631	4,523
2003	7,280	9	1,778	5,494

^1 includes hunting and forestry

^2 includes energy and construction

^3 includes financial intermediation services indirectly measured

^4 Components may not sum to totals due to rounding.

The city spearheaded the knowledge advances which gave it preeminence in steel and cutlery production; today the transfer of technology from Sheffield's universities is claimed by some to be "guaranteeing" Sheffield's continuing industrial and commercial evolution, creating cutting-edge enterprises across the city. High technology businesses such as the US company Fluent, Inc., for example, have chosen Sheffield as the centre for their international operations and so has Jennic, specialists in semiconductor design for the home automation, commercial building automation, and industrial process monitoring and control markets. The University of Sheffield supports the growth of technology transfer in the Sheffield City Region through the Kroto Innovation Centre and Sheffield Bioincubator which house small and medium enterprises as well as startup companies working in similar areas, or occasionally alongside, University of Sheffield researchers.

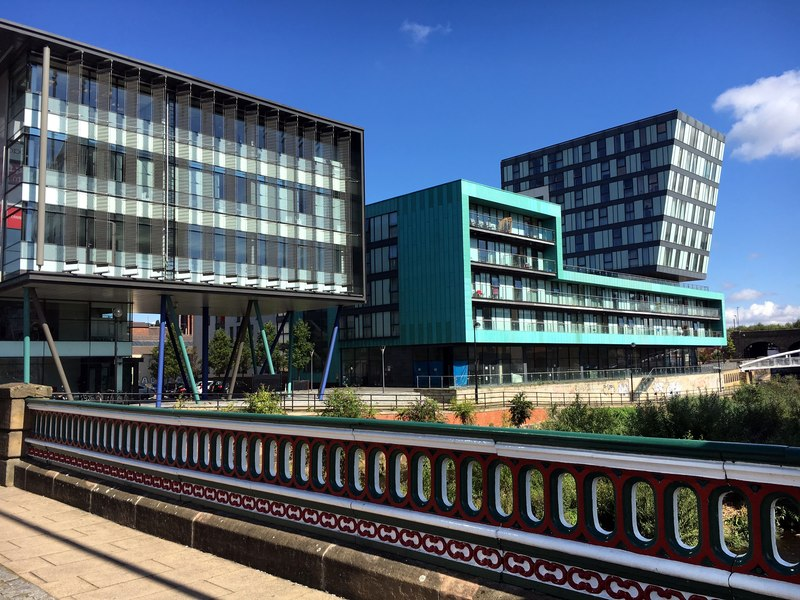
Riverside Development close to Sheffield city centre but part of the Central Business District

Insight Enterprises will invest £50 million in a new European headquarters in the city resulting in 1700 jobs over the 2005–2008 period, while Boeing, through its collaboration with the University of Sheffield will be at the centre of an Advanced Manufacturing Park (AMP) on the edge of the city, home to a cluster of businesses in the advanced manufacturing sector. Other areas of employment include call centres, the City Council, universities and hospitals.

There are signs that the Sheffield economy is seeing a revival. The 2004 Barclays Bank Financial Planning study revealed that, in 2003, the Sheffield district of Hallam was the highest ranking area outside London for overall wealth, the proportion of people earning over £60,000 a year standing at almost 12%. A survey by Knight Frank revealed that Sheffield was the fastest growing city outside London for office and residential space and rents during the second half of 2004.

Cushman & Wakefield's respected Global Research Reports include the "UK Cities Monitor 2008" which placed Sheffield among the top ten "best cities to locate a business today", and reported 3rd and 4th places respectively for best office location and best new call centre location. The same report places Sheffield in 3rd place regarding "greenest reputation" and 2nd in terms of the availability of financial incentives.

As an example of the city's move away from traditional industry, Sheffield is now the home to My Job Group, an online job board whose HQ is based in Sheffield. This site provides an alternative to the traditional way of finding employment in Sheffield, which is through the local newspaper whose main vacancies day is Thursday. Technology is also one of the fastest growing industries in Sheffield being home to Capita, Plusnet and Littlefish.

Organised by the Sheffield Chamber of Commerce and Industry, the Sheffield Business Awards is an awards ceremony held on an annual basis to help highlight and promote business and industry in Sheffield and boost the economy of the city.

In 2012, Sheffield City Region Enterprise Zone was launched to promote development in a number of sites in Sheffield and across the wider region. In March 2014 additional sites were added to the zone.

== Employment ==
Labour profile
Sector	People	Ratio
Total employee jobs	239,941	
Full-time	156,407	65.2%
Part-time	83,533	34.8%
Manufacturing	33,568	14.0%
Construction	9,239	3.9%
Services	196,646	82.0%
Distribution, hotels & restaurants	57,924	24.1%
Transport & communications	11,575	4.8%
Finance, IT, other business activities	43,694	18.2%
Public admin, education & health	70,442	29.4%
Other services	13,011	5.4%
Tourism-related	18,146	7.6%

== Tourism ==
Tourism plays a major role in the city's economy on account of numerous attractions—namely the Peak District, sports events (in particular, the Snooker World Championships) and musical festivals (such as Tramlines). In 2019, the tourism industry in Sheffield was valued at £1.36 billion and supported 15,000 jobs.

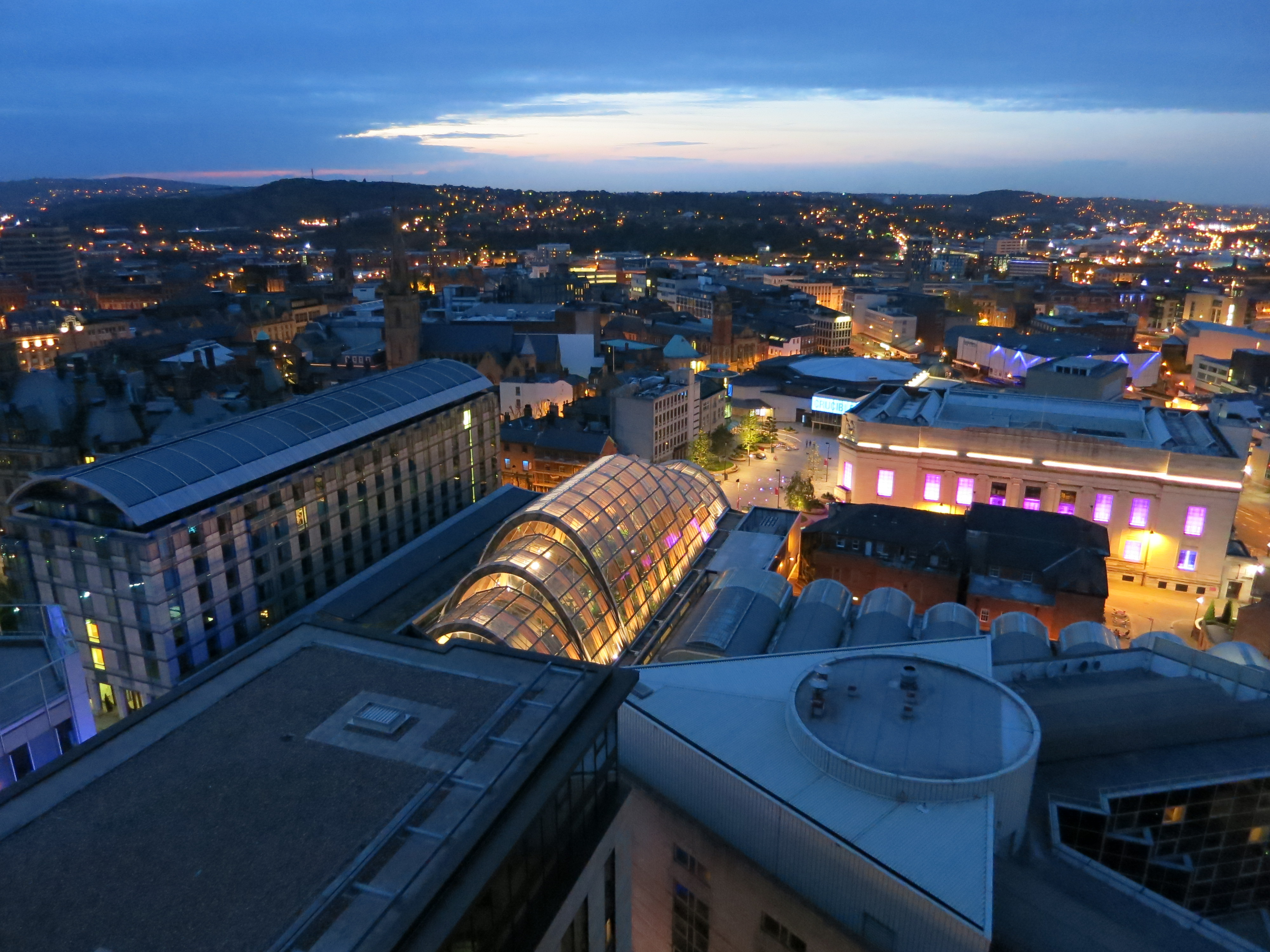
A view of Sheffield City Centre

In 2012, Sheffield City Region Enterprise Zone was launched to promote development in a number of sites in Sheffield and across the wider region. In March 2014 additional sites were added to the zone.

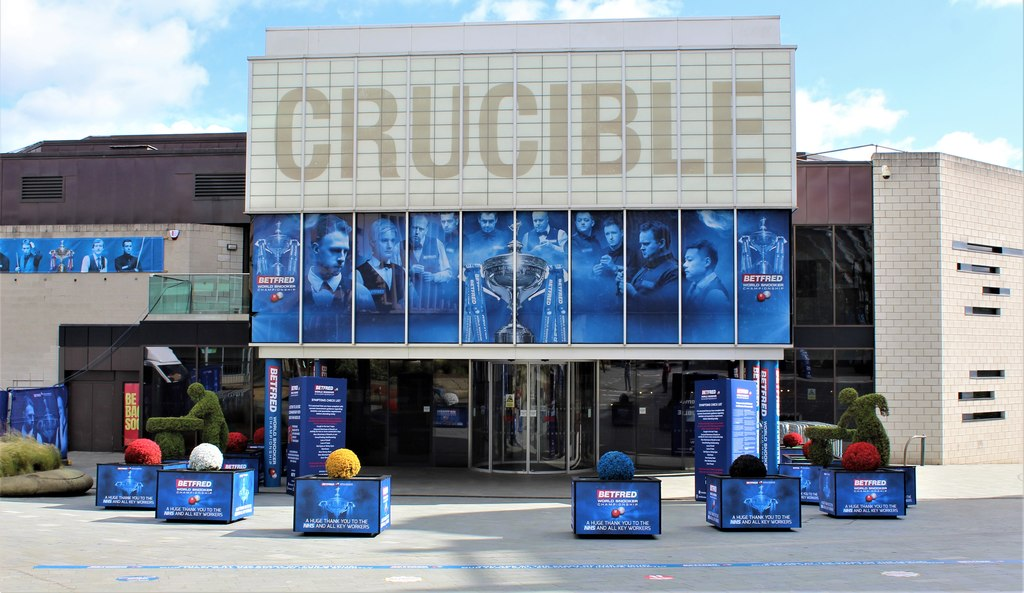
Crucible Theatre

== Retail and leisure ==
Sheffield is a major retail centre, and is home to many high street and department stores as well as designer boutiques.

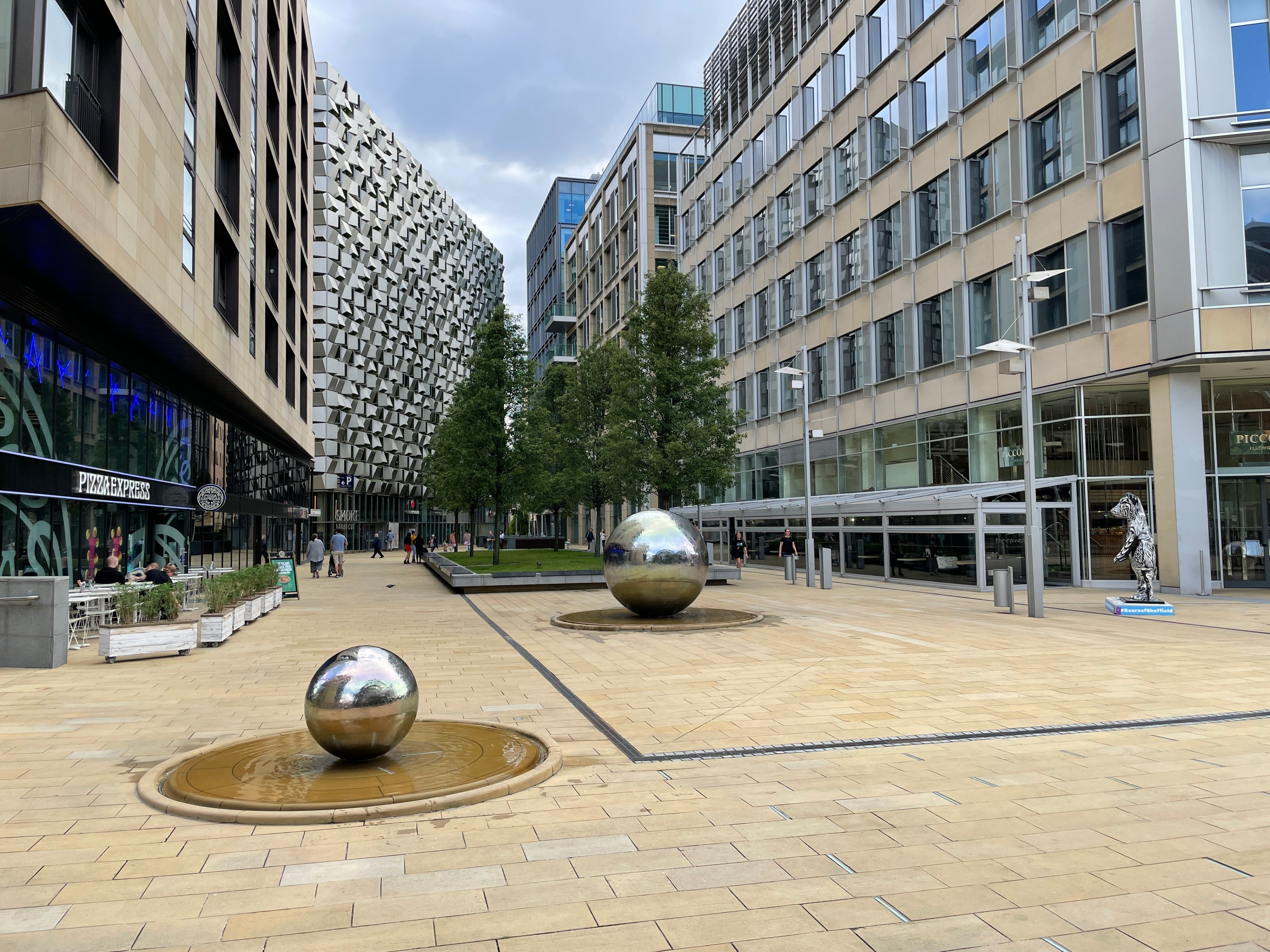
Millennium Square and St Paul’s Place

The main shopping areas in the city centre are on The Moor, Fargate, Orchard Square and the Devonshire Quarter. Department stores in the city centre include Marks and Spencer and Atkinsons. Sheffield's main market was once Castle Market, built above the remains of the castle. This has since been demolished. Sheffield Moor Market opened in 2013 and became the main destination for fresh produce.

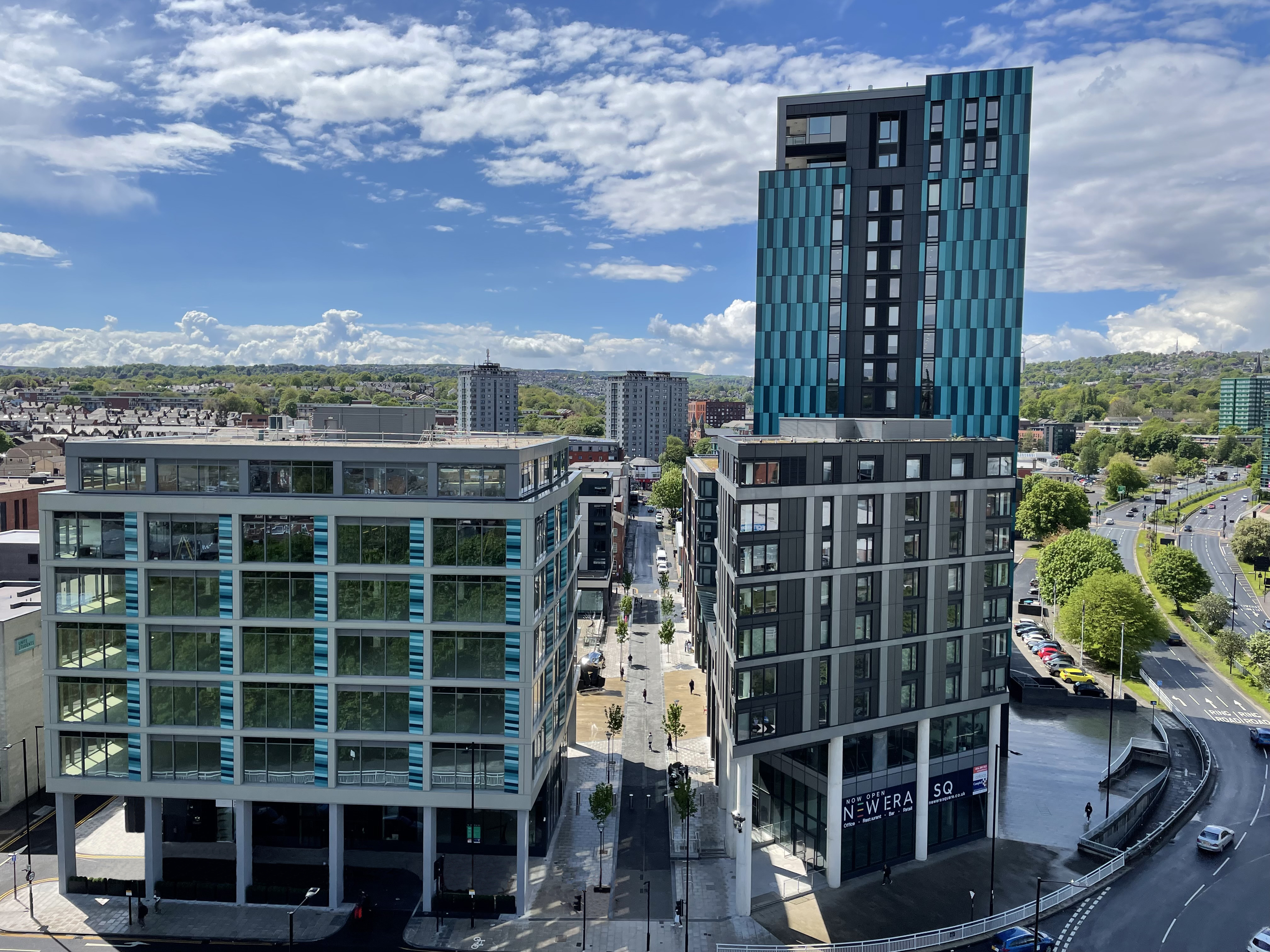
New Era Square, the Chinese Quarter

The market has 196 stalls and includes local and organic produce, as well as international fusion cuisine such as Russian, Jamaican and Thai.

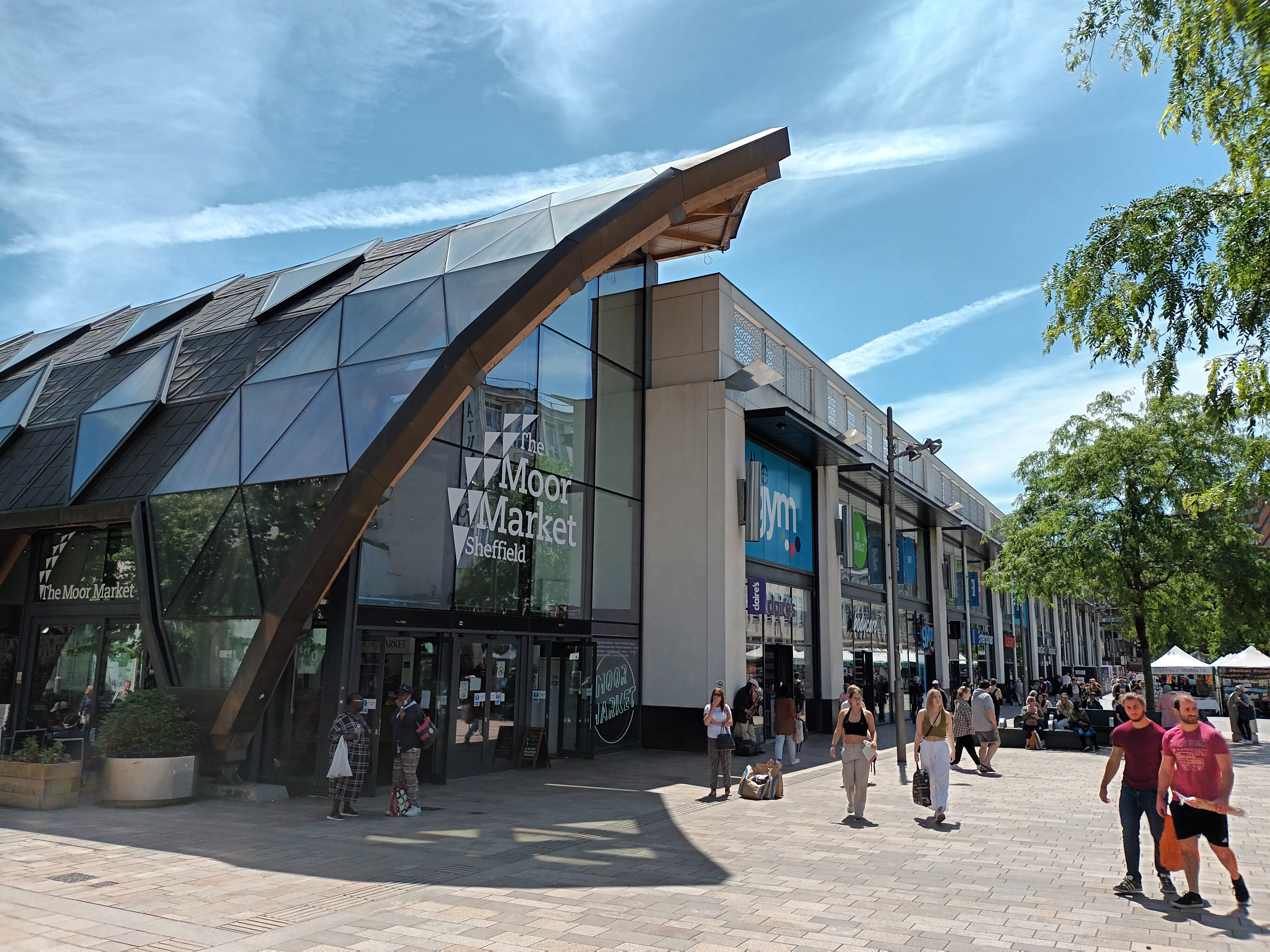
The Moor Market

With the decline in high street shopping around the UK, efforts have been made to rejuvenate Sheffield City Centre and improve the retail and leisure offering. Major developments include Leopold Square, The Moor, St Paul's Place (a mixed use development) and the Heart of the City I & II projects.

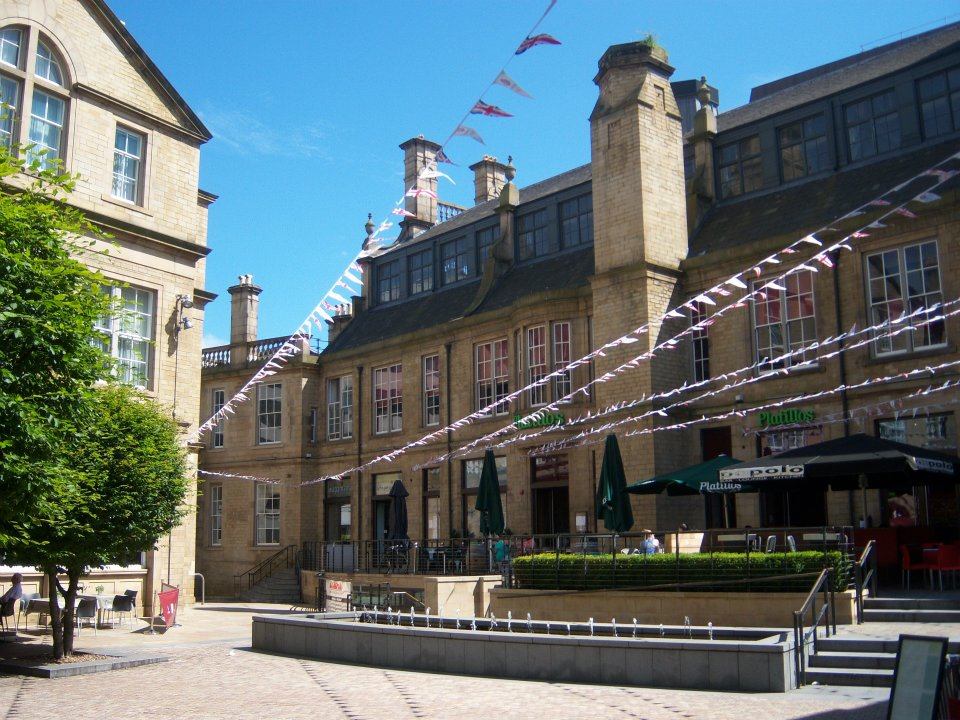
Leopold Square

In March 2022 Sheffield City Council announced that a new leisure hub would be constructed at the southern end of Fargate. The £300,000 hub will feature cafes, shops and large-screen TVs for sports events. The development is also related to other efforts to rejuvenate the Fargate area, such as a new mixed-use events and coworking hub at 20–26 Fargate, also overseen by Sheffield City Council.

=== Shopping centres ===
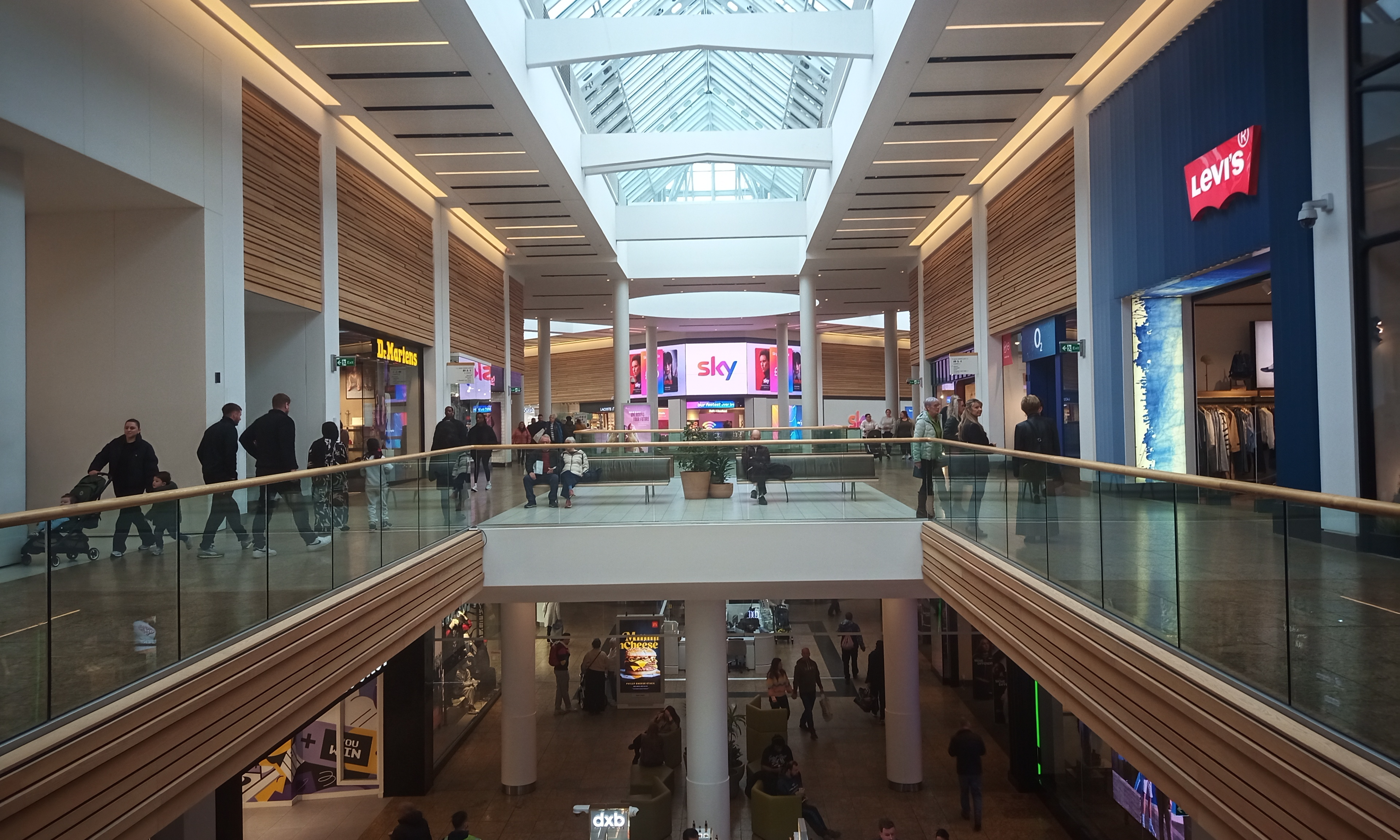
Meadowhall

Meadowhall shopping centre, located to the north-east of Sheffield close to the boundary with Rotherham and next to the M1 motorway, is a major regional shopping destination and currently ranked eleventh largest in the UK with a floorspace of 1.5 million ft^{2} (140,000 m^{2}). Attracting over 30 million visitors a year (up from 19 million in its first year), the centre hosts 270 shops, 37 restaurants and a cinema. Many nationally renowned brands have a presence at the centre including Marks & Spencer, Hugo Boss and Jaeger. The centre is connected to the city centre by rail, Supertram and bus services. Prior to the opening of Meadowhall, the site was occupied for East Hecla (steel) works, a major employer in the north-east of the city. The opening of Meadowhall in 1990 marked the beginning of major rejuvenation in the Lower Don Valley as the steel industry contracted. In a 2010 survey of forecast expenditure at retail centres in the United Kingdom, Meadowhall was ranked 12th and Sheffield City Centre 19th.

To the South of Meadowhall shopping centre is Meadowhall Retail Park, a 190,500-square-foot (17,700 m^{2}) retail park with 13 retail and food units. Next to the retail park is the Sheffield IKEA store, opened in 2017. The opening ceremony was attended by dignitaries including the Swedish Ambassador to the UK. The Sheffield store was the 20th opened in the UK and led to the creation of 480 new local jobs.

The second-largest shopping centre in Sheffield is Crystal Peaks, located in the south-east of the city, alongside Drakehouse Retail Park. Both the shopping centre and the retail park opened in 1988 and now attract around 11 million visitors a year. In total there are 101 retailers (including eateries) at Crystal Peaks and Drakehouse, including a range of high street brands. Crystal Peaks also includes a travel interchange which serves as the hub for bus travel in the east and south-east of Sheffield.

=== Suburbs ===
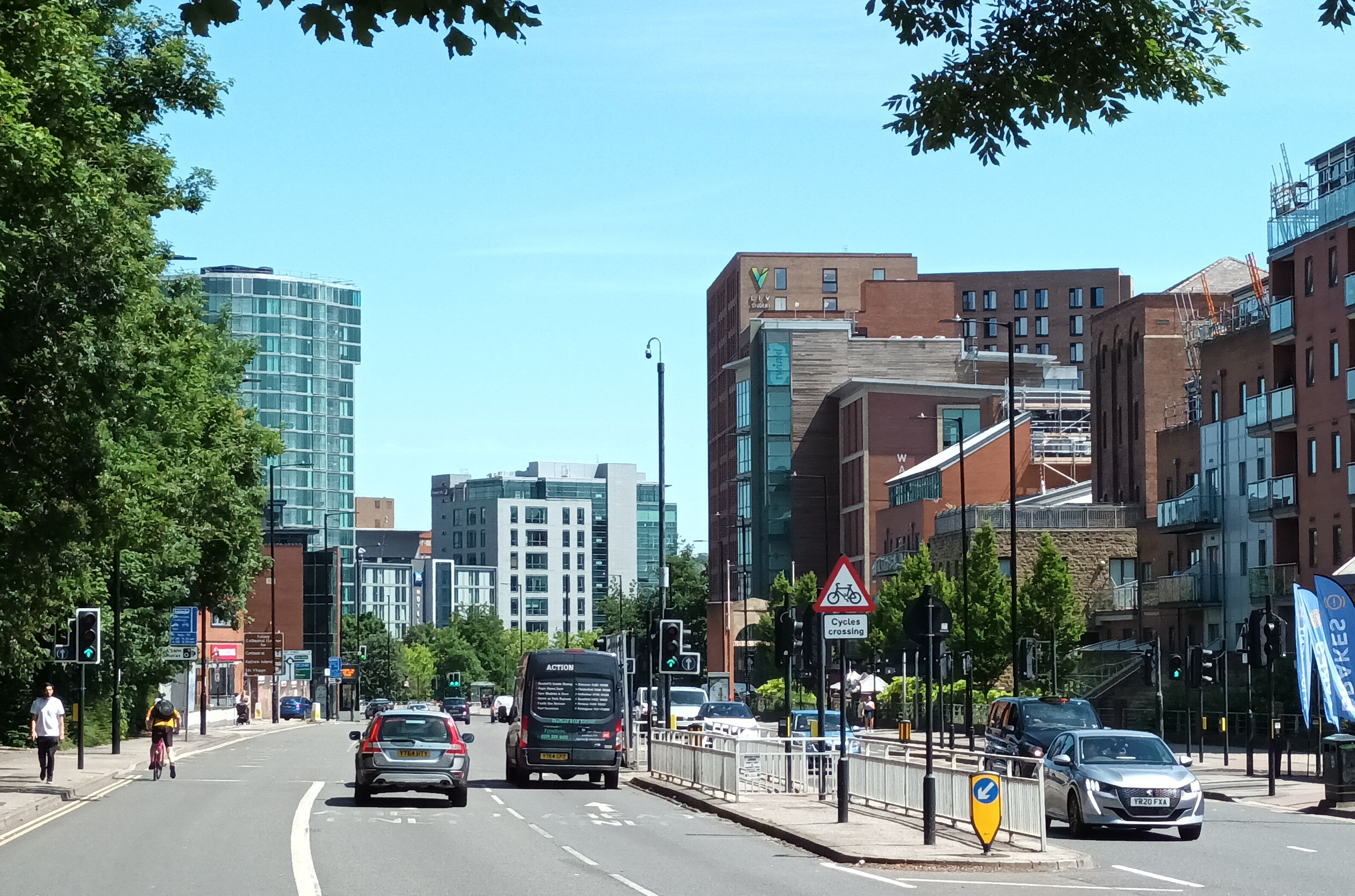
Ecclesall Road

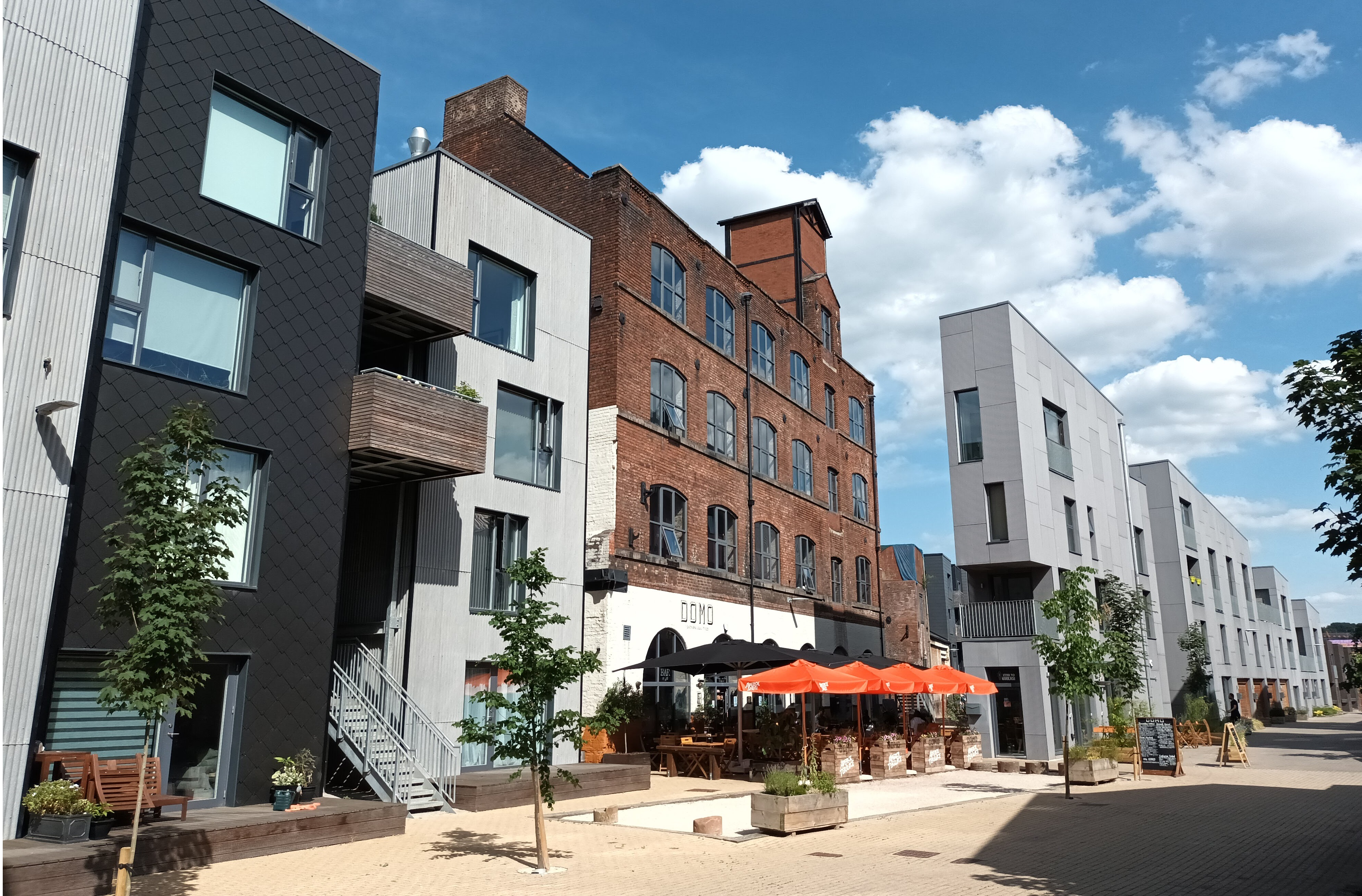
Little Kelham in the Kelham Island Quarter

Beyond the city centre there are numerous other leisure and shopping areas. To the south-west of the city centre is Ecclesall Road, a major thoroughfare connecting the south-western suburbs to the city centre and lined with bars, restaurants and cafes, as well as housing. The area has a large student community owing to the presence of the Sheffield Hallam University Collegiate Campus adjacent to Ecclesall Road. The leisure section of the road is approximately 1.6 mi (2.5 km) long, with the south-western end becoming Ecclesall Road South and a predominantly residential area. Another popular shopping and leisure area is London Road, to the south of the city centre. The road is famous for its multicultural community which has led to an abundance of international cuisines being served at restaurants along the road. To the west of the city centre is Broomhill, a student-centric neighbourhood which also caters for school students as well local university students and NHS staff. To the north-west of the city centre are Hillsborough, a large retail and sports hub, and Stocksbridge Fox Valley, a modern leisure and retail centre built on a brownfield industrial site.

In the late 2010s and early 2020s several new developments began to the north of the city centre in the Kelham Island Quarter, an increasingly popular mixed-use development. The area has become known for its independent cafes, restaurants and pubs and has seen significant residential development in recent years.

== History ==
The steel industry dates back to at least the 14th century. In 1740 Benjamin Huntsman discovered the crucible technique for steel manufacture, at his workshop in the district of Handsworth. This process had an enormous impact on the quantity and quality of steel production and was only made obsolete, a century later, in 1856 by Henry Bessemer's invention of the Bessemer converter which allowed the true mass production of steel. Bessemer had moved his Bessemer Steel Company to Sheffield to be at the heart of the industry. Thomas Boulsover invented Sheffield Plate (silver-plated copper), in the early 18th century. A major Sheffield steel invention was that of stainless steel by Harry Brearley in 1912, and the work of Profs. F. B. Pickering and T. Gladman throughout the 1960s, '70s, and '80s was fundamental to the development of modern high strength low alloy steels.

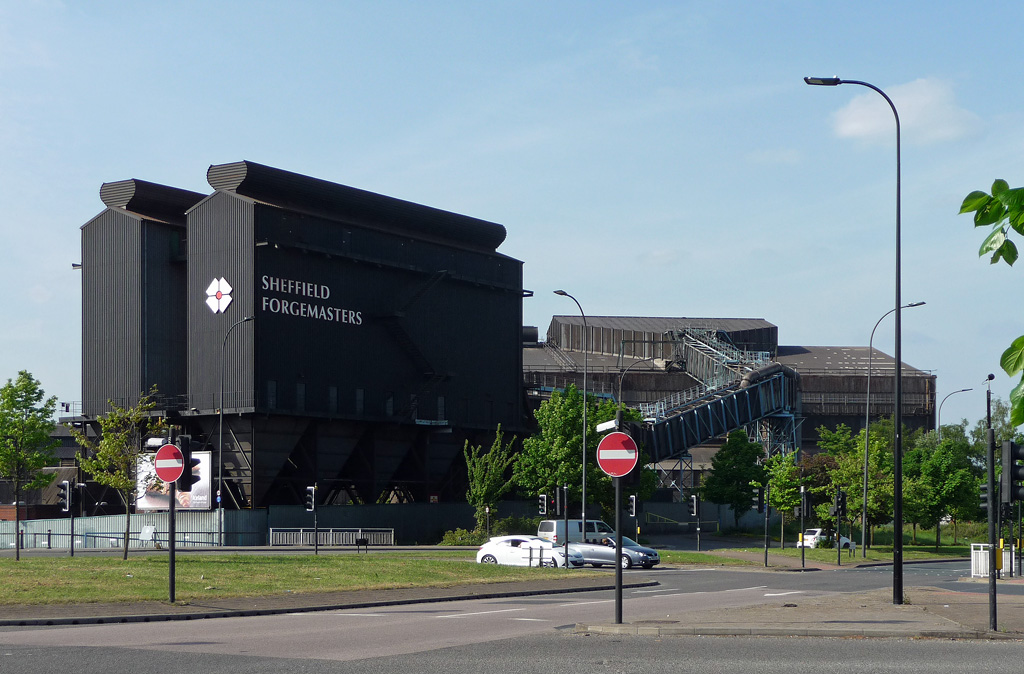
Sheffield Forgemasters

The Sheffield Assay Office, which opened in 1773, stamps precious metals with the city's crown mark. The Company of Cutlers in Hallamshire was created in 1624 to regulate the manufacture of edged tools. The head of this company (the Master Cutler) is held in regard equal to the city's lord mayor and it has powers over the trademarking of steel with the Sheffield area.

While iron and steel have always been the main industries of Sheffield, coal mining has been a major feature of the outlying areas, and the Palace of Westminster in London was built using limestone and paving from quarries in the nearby villages of Anston and Green Moor.

The Sheffield Industrial Museums Trust, a partnership between Sheffield City Council, Sheffield Hallam University and the Company of Cutlers in Hallamshire has preserved key sites associated with the city's industrial heritage, some of which actually still operate ancient equipment for the public, such as the Abbeydale Industrial Hamlet and the Kelham Island Museum. Northwest of the city lies Wortley Top Forge, which was a heavy ironworks of international renown. It is a site of historical and industrial importance, contributing to Sheffield's reputation for manufacturing high-quality, precision steel goods, though actually it is located within the boundaries of neighbouring Barnsley.

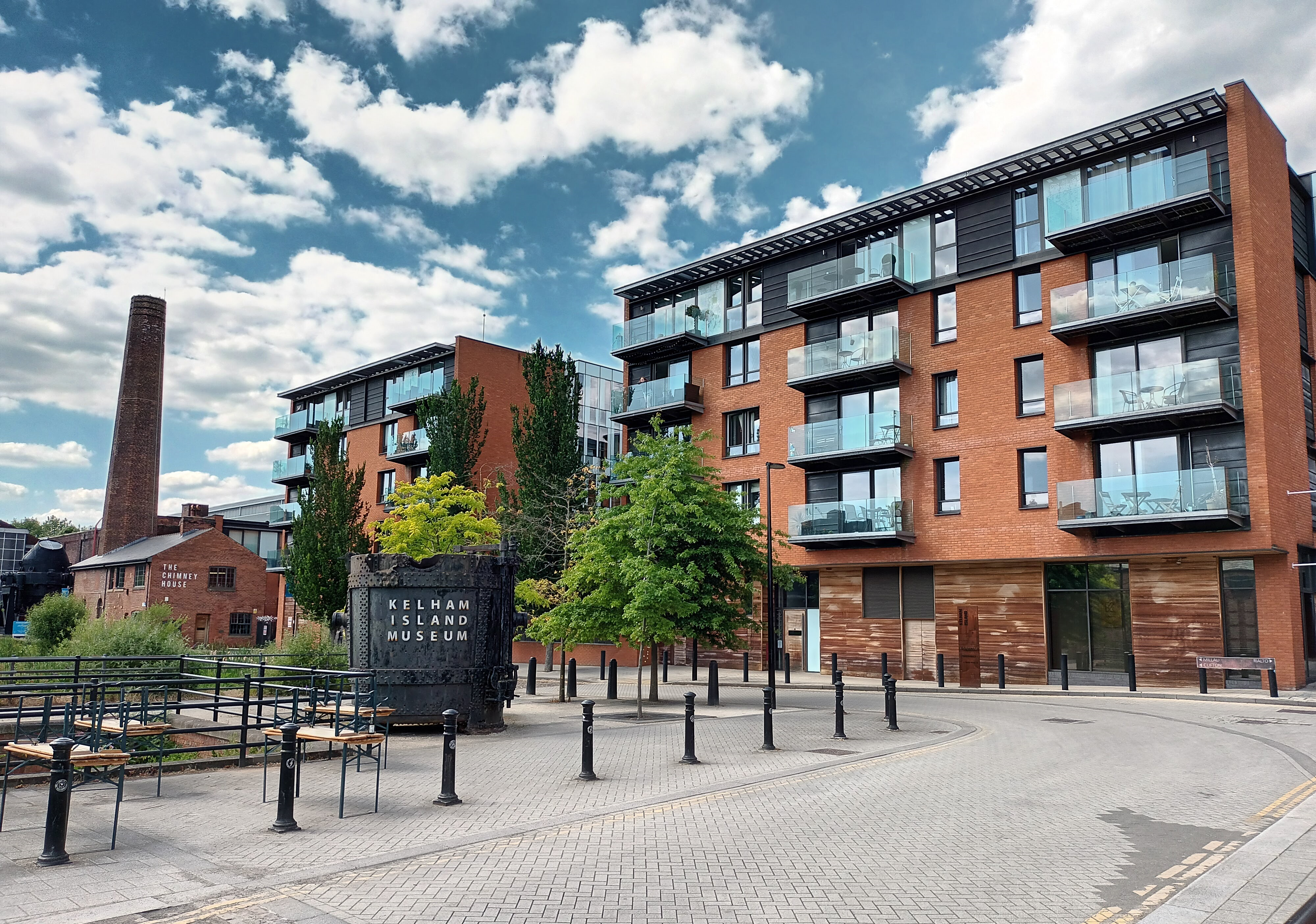
Kelham Island Museum

This industry used Sheffield's unique combination of local Iron, Coal and water power supplied by the local rivers. This fuelled a massive growth in the city's population that expanded from 60,995 in 1801 to a peak of 577,050 in 1951. However, due to increasing competition from imports, it has seen a decline in heavy engineering industries since the 1960s, which has forced the sector to streamline its operations and lay off the majority of the local employment. The steel industry now concentrates on more specialist steel-making and, in 2005, produced more steel per year by value than at any other time in its history. The industry is now less noticeable as it has become highly automated and employs far fewer staff than in the past. However a small number of skilled industrial automation engineers still thrive in it. Today the economy is worth over £7 billion a year.
