= List of companies in Sheffield =

The following companies are either headquartered or have significant bases in Sheffield, South Yorkshire, England.

== Sheffield-based ==
For former companies, see navigation box at the bottom of page.

- A.L. Simpkin & Co. Ltd - confectionery producer
- Ancon Building Products - specialist stainless steel brickwork supports
- Arnold Laver & Co Holdings - UK HQ - timber importer and merchants
- Arthur Price & Co. - cutlery manufacturers
- ARUP - engineering consultancy
- B. Braun - UK HQ, medical appliances and surgical instruments manufacturer
- Company of Cutlers in Hallamshire - metalworker's guild
- DavyMarkham Ltd - HQ - construction engineering
- Department for Work and Pensions - civil service
- Fluent, Inc. European HQ - computer simulation of fluid dynamics (CFD)
- Forgemasters - HQ for Sheffield Forgemasters International Ltd.
- Gripple - producers of fencing materials
- Henry Boot PLC - FTSE-listed construction company
- Insight Enterprises - computer hardware suppliers
- Irwin Mitchell - HQ of top 50 law firm
- John Wilson - manufacturer of ice skating blades
- Kelham island brewery - micro brewery
- Land Instruments International - manufacturer of industrial infrared temperature measurement devices and gas analysers
- NAVCA - National Association for Voluntary and Community Action, the national body for Third Sector local infrastructure organisations in England
- OCLC (UK) Ltd. - library automation systems
- Outokumpu (Avesta Polarit) - UK HQ, stainless steel distributor
- Parexel - clinical trials contracts, statistical analysis
- Planet X Bikes - professional bike retailer and manufacturer
- Richlyn Systems - software and website developers
- SDL International - translation software
- SIG plc - HQ, European supplier of insulation, roofing and commercial interiors
- Spear & Jackson International Ltd -HQ - hand tool manufacturers
- Sumo Digital - games (formerly Infogrames and Gremlin)
- Swann Morton - manufacturer of surgical scalpels
- The Boeing Company - aerospace manufacturer
- Thos. W. Ward - steel manufacturer
- Twinkl - online educational publishing house
- Ufi Ltd - EGovernment Online training organisation
- UK Visas and Immigration - part of the Home Office
- WANdisco - software producers
- Warp Records - independent record label, who also set up:
  - Bleep.com - an online record-store
  - Warp Films - their film division
- William Stones Ltd - now defunct brewers
- William Whiteley and Sons - manufacturer of scissors

== Major presence in Sheffield ==
- ARM Holdings
- Autodesk - CAD software
- Aviva (formerly Norwich Union - call centre)
- BAE Systems - production of artillery weapons, i.e. 155-mm M777 howitzers
- BT Group - call centre and local network administration; Plusnet subsidiary HQ
- Capgemini - data (Rotherham)
- Capita - public sector outsourcing
- DLA Piper - international law firm (branch office)
- DXC Technology - IT consulting
- George Wimpey - area office, national house builder
- HSBC - bank's national IT centre, and underground data centre at Tankersley
- IBM - IT consulting
- McLaren Automotive - British automotive manufacturer (Corporate Office and Composites Technology Centre located on Seldon Way, Catcliffe, Sheffield S60 5XA)
- Mondelēz International - liquorice allsorts, Jelly Babies, wine gums etc factory
- Nabarro LLP - law firm
- Nationwide Building Society - building society call centre
- NXP Semiconductors - chip design
- Primetals Technologies - mining technology
- Tata Steel Europe - steel maker (bought Corus Group)
- Tesco - regional distribution centre (Clowne)
- Virgin Media - formerly Telewest Broadband, flagship call centre

== See also ==
- Economy of Sheffield
