= USS Betelgeuse (AKA-11) =

Cargo ship of the United States Navy

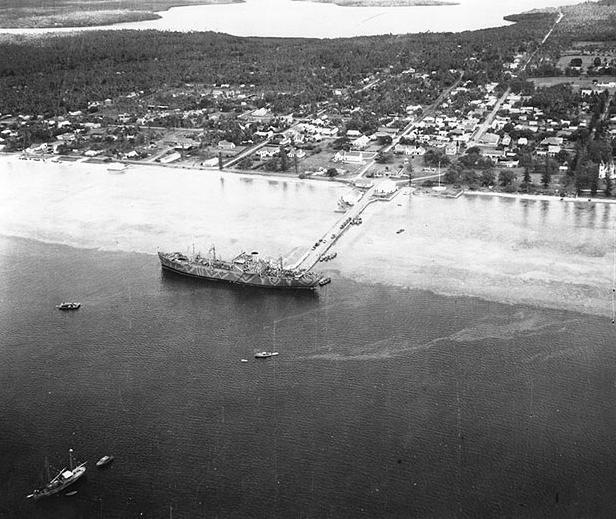
- Betelgeuse alongside the pier at Tongatapu, Tonga Islands, 8 June 1942

History

United States
- Name: USS Betelgeuse
- Namesake: Betelgeuse, a star in the constellation Orion
- Builder: Sun Shipbuilding & Drydock Co., Chester, Pennsylvania
- Laid down: 9 March 1939
- Launched: 18 September 1939, as Mormaclark
- Acquired: 29 May 1941
- Commissioned: 14 June 1941, as Betelgeuse (AK-28)
- Decommissioned: 15 March 1946
- Reclassified: AKA-11 (attack cargo ship), 1 February 1943
- Stricken: 28 March 1946
- Honours and awards: 6 battle stars (World War II)
- Fate: Sold into merchant service, 27 June 1947; Scrapped, after April 1972

General characteristics
- Class & type: Arcturus-class attack cargo ship
- Type: Type C2 ship
- Displacement: 5,500 long tons (5,588 t) light
- Length: 459 ft 1 in (139.93 m)
- Beam: 63 ft (19 m)
- Draft: 25 ft 10 in (7.87 m)
- Propulsion: 2-stroke, 4-cylinder single-acting Doxford diesel engine, 1 shaft, 6,000 shp (4.5 MW)
- Speed: 15.5 knots (28.7 km/h; 17.8 mph)
- Complement: 267
- Armament: 1 × 5"/38 caliber gun mount; 4 × 3 in (76 mm) gun mounts; 4 × twin 40 mm gun mounts; 18 × 20 mm gun mounts

USS Betelgeuse (AK-28/AKA-11) was an Arcturus-class attack cargo ship, the first United States Navy ship named for Betelgeuse, a star in the constellation Orion. She served as a commissioned ship for 4 years and 9 months.

== History ==
=== Acquisition ===
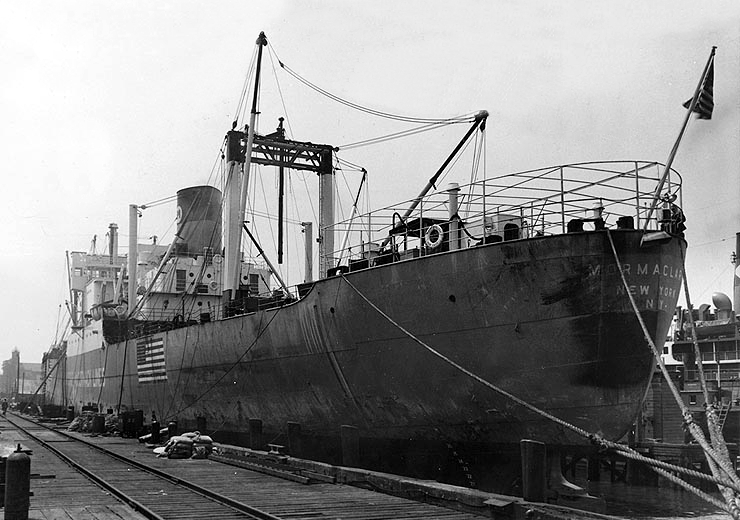
Mormaclark at Brewer shipyard in Staten Island during conversion, 6 June 1941

Betelgeuse was laid down as a C-2D on 9 March 1939 at Chester, Pennsylvania, by the Sun Shipbuilding & Drydock Co., Hull 180 under a Maritime Commission contract (MC hull 31); launched as Mormaclark on 18 September 1939; sponsored by Miss Anne Perry Woodward; delivered to the Moore McCormack Lines, Inc., on 29 November 1939; acquired by the Navy on 29 May 1941; renamed Betelgeuse on 3 June 1941; converted for naval service by the Brewer Dry Dock Company, Staten Island, N.Y.; and commissioned as AK-28 on 14 June.

From her commissioning nearly through the fall of 1941, the cargo ship operated in the Atlantic conducting amphibious maneuvers off North Carolina in June and July, performing similar evolutions off Virginia in September, and carrying cargo to Bermuda and various ports in the West Indies during October. She then entered the Charleston Navy Yard for an overhaul and was there when the Japanese attacked Pearl Harbor on 7 December.

=== 1942, South Pacific ===
Early in January 1942, Betelgeuse loaded Army cargo and, on 19 February, got underway in convoy for Belfast, Northern Ireland, and Clydebank, Scotland. Returning to New York on 25 March, she took on more supplies and sailed on 8 April with a convoy bound for the Tonga Islands, where the Navy was setting up an advanced base to consolidate the defenses of the communication and logistics lines with Australia. On 9 May, the convoy arrived at Tongatapu which the Navy was developing as a fuel base, an alternate air cargo staging port, an air support point for Fiji and Samoa, and a safe harbor for hospital ship Solace.

Betelgeuse set course for San Diego on 7 June, loaded cargo there, and got underway again on 1 July. At Pearl Harbor, she joined Task Force 62 (TF 62) which had assembled for the invasion of Guadalcanal in the Solomon Islands. Leaving Hawaii on 31 July and arriving in "Ironbottom Sound" off Guadalcanal on 7 August, Betelgeuse quickly unloaded her cargo in the face of Japanese air attacks. On the day after the landings, she shot down two enemy planes.

For the next five months, the cargo ship made resupply and reinforcement voyages to Guadalcanal and Tulagi in support of the campaign to overcome the stubborn Japanese resistance there. Although she only stood off the beaches for 15 days out of that period, she claimed eight enemy planes while sustaining only minor damage herself. Primarily, Betelgeuse hauled supplies to Guadalcanal from Espiritu Santo and Efate, New Hebrides; from Nouméa, New Caledonia; and from Wellington and Auckland, New Zealand. On 1 September, she landed the first men of the Naval Construction Battalions ("Seabees") on Guadalcanal to improve Henderson Field and to build other facilities.

While unloading supplies at Guadalcanal on 21 November, the ship grounded after developing engine problems that would hamper her repeatedly during the ensuing year. After temporary repairs, the cargo ship got underway on Christmas Day and headed for the California coast. She arrived in San Pedro on 9 January 1943 and underwent additional repairs. Reclassified an attack cargo ship, AKA-11, on 1 February, Betelgeuse sailed for the east coast and arrived at Charleston, South Carolina, on 8 March for the alterations that would fit her for her new role. With her holds specially modified for rapid unloading during combat, she went to sea early in April to begin a month's training in Chesapeake Bay.

=== 1943–44, Mediterranean ===
On 10 May, the ship sailed for the Mediterranean to participate in the invasion of Sicily as part of TF 81, codenamed "Dime" force. Following rehearsals at Algiers in June, TF 81 landed at Gela on 10 July in one of the most bitterly contested operations in Sicily. From her position off the beach immediately to starboard of Rear Admiral John L. Hall Jr.'s flagship Samuel Chase (AP-56), Betelgeuse closely observed the action. Owing to rough seas, night unloading, and poor beach conditions, the attack cargo ship lost several landing craft. One of her sailors was killed by wild fire from a landing craft during an air raid. Moreover, her old engine problems returned. Her propulsion plant broke down while she was in the swept channel and the ship drifted helplessly through enemy minefields before regaining control of her helm and averting disaster. On 24 July, she sailed for home for overhaul.

Betelgeuse arrived at Norfolk, Virginia on 14 August and spent the next eight months in repair yards along the east coast. The repairs to her main engine were successfully completed at her builder's yard in Chester; and, on 4 May 1944, she got underway for the Mediterranean.

After preinvasion training off Salerno in June and early July, the "Camel" force, of which Betelgeuse was part, formed up at Palermo and set out for the southern coast of France. The invasion of Provence proved to be a quiet and quick operation. She remained in the invasion area only two days to unload her cargo at Red Beach in the Golfe de Frejus. The ship then made five more trips from ports in North Africa to points along the French and Italian coasts carrying equipment and troops to feed the Allied advances.

=== 1945, Pacific ===
The cargo ship departed the Mediterranean on 25 September 1944 and returned to the United States to have improved communications and radar gear installed. On New Year's Day 1945, she got underway for the Pacific theater. After transiting the Panama Canal and steaming to Hawaii, Betelgeuse took on a load of Army cargo at Pearl Harbor and steamed to Guadalcanal for practice landings in preparation for the invasion of the Ryukyus. She then stopped at Ulithi for fuel and more provisions, before heading for Okinawa.

Betelgeuse stood off the Hagushi beaches on D-Day, 1 April, and began unloading her cargo. Her labors proceeded smoothly and efficiently until the 6th, when the Japanese mounted major kamikaze air attacks. During the ensuing raids, four of her men received minor wounds from flying shell fragments; but the ship herself sustained only minor damage from strafing. On 9 April, Betelgeuse departed Okinawa and headed for Port Chicago, California, whence she made two shuttle runs carrying ammunition to Pearl Harbor before the war ended.

Upon learning of Japan's surrender on 15 August, Betelgeuse sailed from San Francisco for the Philippines to embark troops at Lingayen Gulf, Manila, and Batangas for occupation duty in Otaru on Hokkaidō in Japan. After that task, she returned to the Philippines, at Samar, where she embarked Seabees for passage to China. Arriving at Tientsin on 10 November, she received orders that sent her to Guam, Pearl Harbor, and San Francisco to carry returning soldiers home in time for Christmas.

Betelgeuse departed the west coast on 28 December and headed for New York. She was decommissioned at the New York Naval Shipyard on 15 March 1946, and her name was struck from the Navy List on 28 March.

Refitted for merchant service, she operated as Mormaclark until sold on 27 June 1947 to Compania de La Paloma, S.A., out of Ancon, Canal Zone, under the name Star Betelgeuse. In 1949, she still operated under the Panamanian flag; but her owner was then Compania Naviera.

Sold for scrapping in 1972, the ship arrived at Kaohsiung, Taiwan, 7 April 1972 for dismantling.

== Awards ==
Betelgeuse earned six battle stars for her World War II service.
