= William Whiteley (disambiguation) =

William Whiteley may refer to:

- William Whiteley (1831–1907), British entrepreneur, founder of Whiteleys department store in London
- William G. Whiteley (1819–1886), United States Representative from Delaware
- William Whiteley (politician) (1881–1955), British Labour Member of Parliament for Blaydon in County Durham
- William Henry Whiteley (1834–1903), Newfoundland politician
- Bill Whiteley, fictional character in British soap opera, Emmerdale
- William Whiteley and Sons, British scissors manufacturer.
- William Whitely (instrument maker) (1789–1871), American musical instrument maker
