= Early American Industries Association =

Historic preservation organization

- Founded: August 31, 1933; 93 years ago
- Tax ID no.: 15-6024410
- Legal status: 501(c)(3) nonprofit organization
- Headquarters: Hebron, Maryland
- President: Dana B.Shoafl
- Executive Director: John H. Verrill
- Revenue: $140,239 (2014)
- Expenses: $140,170 (2014)
- Endowment: $860,000
- Employees: 1 (2014)
- Volunteers: 35 (2014)
- Website: earlyamericanindustries.org

The Early American Industries Association (EAIA) was founded in 1933 by a group of people interested in the traditional trades and crafts of early America. They met to discuss the rapidly disappearing practitioners of these trades, including those of the shop, farm, sea, and home. They were concerned about the loss of the skills and knowledge of the tools and practices of those trades and wanted to do something to preserve them. Their solution was the formation of the EAIA, subsequently incorporated on March 16, 1942, as a nonprofit educational organization interested in all aspects of the mechanical arts in America.

The work of the EAIA is funded through support from over 2,000 members across the US and abroad and revenue earned through sales of publications, merchandise, and programs. These resources enable the EAIA to preserve and present historic trades, crafts, and tools and to interpret their impact on our lives.

== Activities ==
The association immediately commenced publication of a quarterly journal, The Chronicle, which publishes articles on a broad variety of subjects within their fields of interest. Over the years they have issued occasional publications, reprinting important texts and disseminating historical documents and images. Recent publications include the Directory of American Toolmakers, A Pattern Book of Tools and Household Goods, and a CD-ROM comprising the first 60 volumes of The Chronicle.

The EAIA holds an annual meeting, usually held at a major museum with related interests, at which there are programs by members including talks, demonstrations, displays and tool exchanges. There are also regional meetings around the country providing smaller, more accessible versions of the annual meeting.

Since 1978 the EAIA has made over 100 research grants to support original research, publication, and exhibitions related to their mission. For more than a decade a week-long program of workshops have taken place in cooperation with Eastfield Village, East Nassau, New York, at which participants are introduced to a number of traditional trades. There is also an annual "Tool Tour" to Europe focused on museums, sites, and collections related to the history of the mechanical arts.

== Books inspired by the EAIA ==
Testimony to the effectiveness of the EAIA may be found in many publications, including:

- American Woodworking Tools, by Paul B. Kebabian & Dudley Whitney, New York Graphic Society (1979) ISBN 0-8212-0731-8
- Collecting Antique Tools, by Herbert P. Kean & Emil S. Pollak, Astragal Press (1990) ISBN 0-9618088-5-3
- Tools: A Guide for Collectors, by Jane & Mark Rees, Astragal Press (1999) ISBN 0-904638-12-X
- The Wooden Plane, by John M. Whelan, Astragal Press (1993) ISBN 1-8793353-2-8
- A Treasury of American Scrimshaw, by Michael McManus, Studio (1997) ISBN 0-670-86234-7
- Before Photocopying: The Art and History of Mechanical Copying 1780-1938, by Barbara J. Rhodes & William W. Streeter, Oak Knoll (1999) ISBN 1-8847186-1-2
- With Hammer in Hand, by Charles F. Hummel, University Press of Virginia (1976) ISBN 0-8139-0124-3

== See also ==
- Historic preservation
- Tools and Trades History Society
