= Tools and Trades History Society =

UK charity

The Tools and Trades History Society (TATHS) is an association in the United Kingdom that aims to further the knowledge and understanding of hand tools and traditional trades. It was founded as a membership association in 1983 and is a registered charity.

The society publishes a quarterly newsletter and a periodical journal, Tools and Trades.

== Exhibition ==
Selected objects from the society's collection are exhibited in the Hall of Tools at Amberley Museum & Heritage Centre in Amberley, near Arundel in West Sussex.

== Library ==
The TATHS maintains a specialist library kept at the Museum of English Rural Life in Reading, Berkshire.

== See also ==
- Early American Industries Association
- Ken Hawley
