= Gripple =

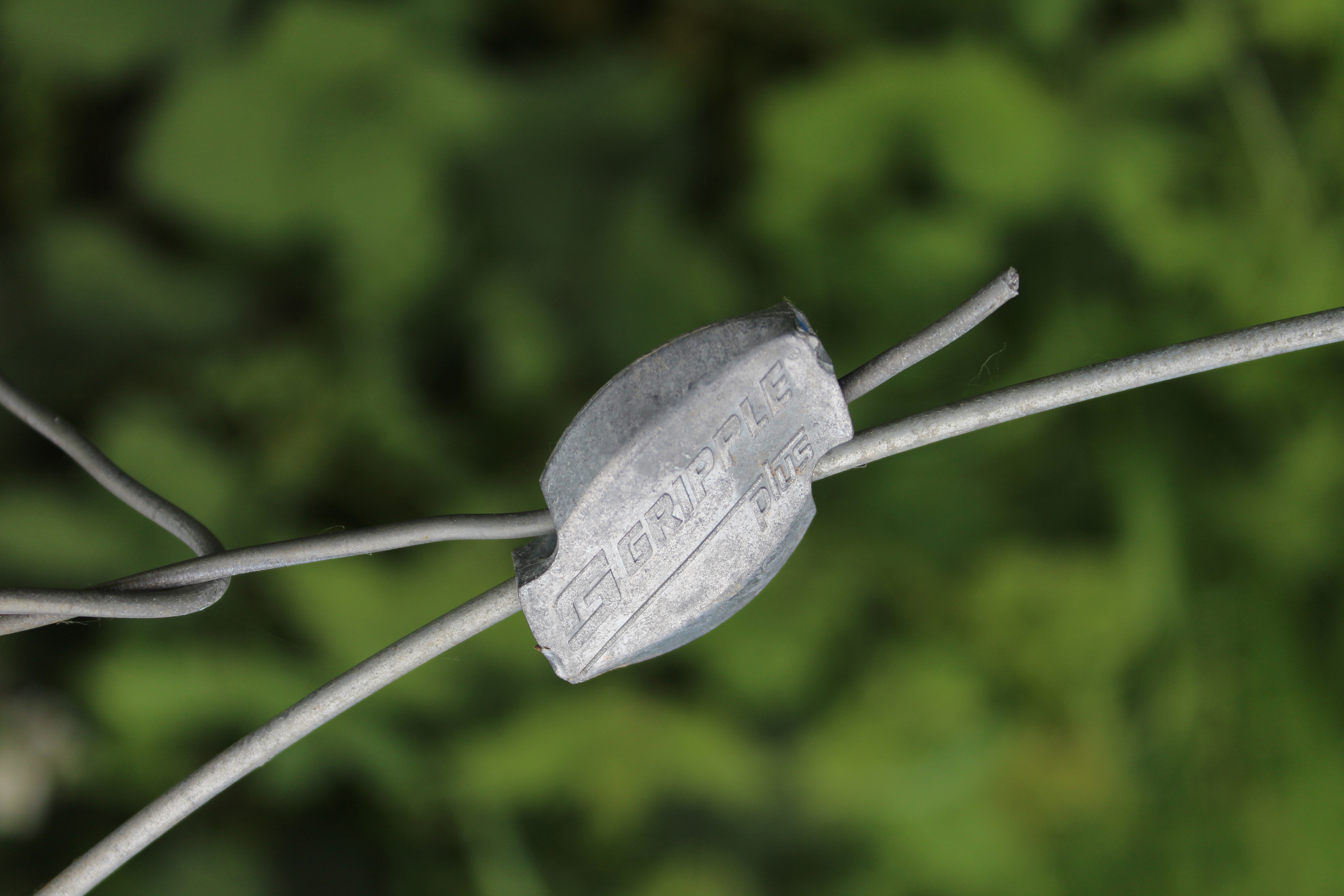
The front of a Gripple wire joiner

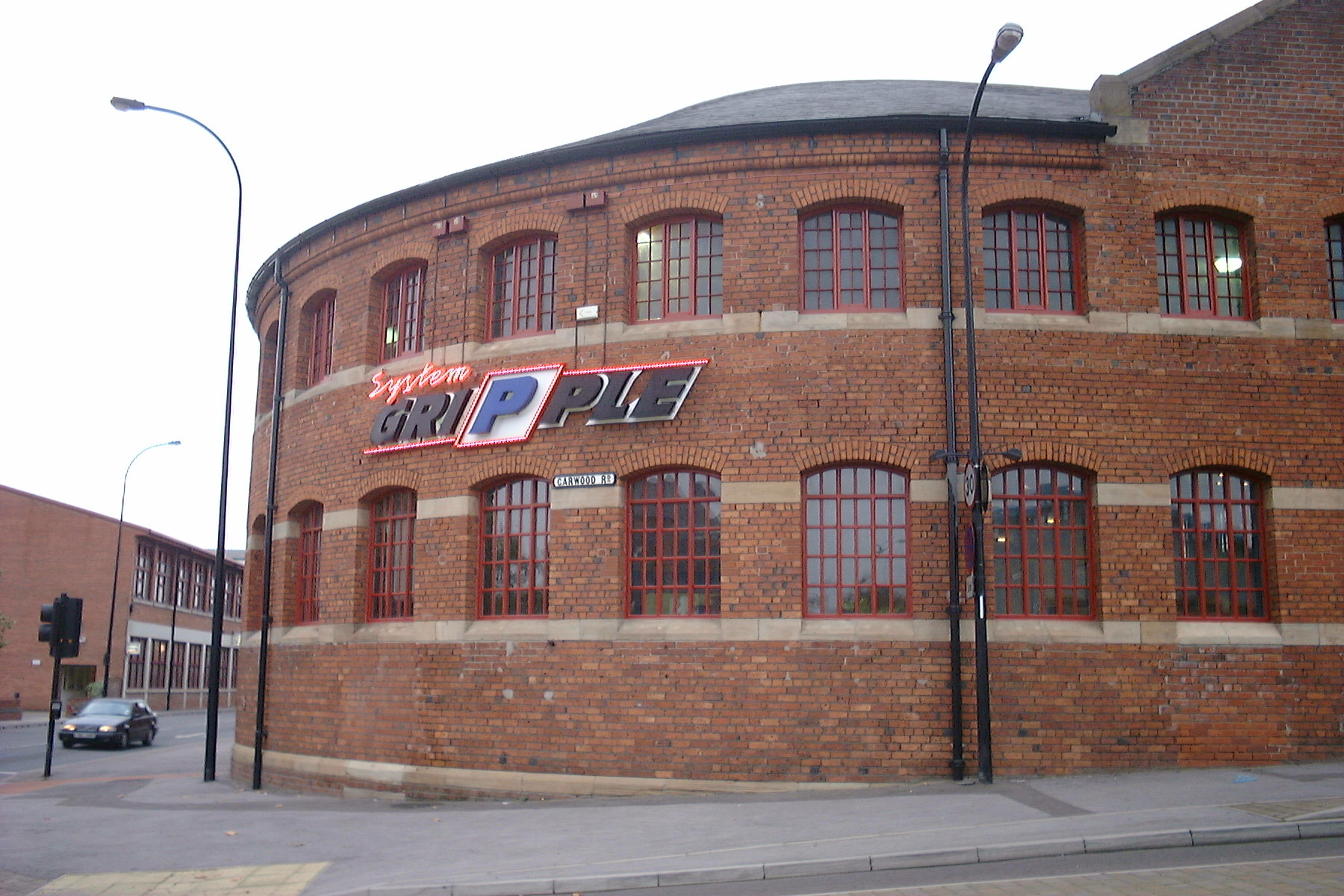
The Gripple main factory in Sheffield

A Gripple wire joiner is a device used to join and tension wire, to terminate and suspend wires and wire ropes, and also to support false ceilings, cable baskets, and similar items. They are manufactured in Sheffield, England by Gripple Ltd. The name derives from the fact the device both "grips" and "pulls" wire.

== History ==
Wire salesman Hugh Facey invented the original "Gripple" wire tensioner and joiner after a conversation in 1986 with a Welsh farmer. The first Gripple wire joiner was launched in the UK in 1988, and Gripple Ltd was established in 1991.

== Description ==
Wire or wire rope is inserted into a channel in the Gripple wire joiner, where it is gripped by a spring-loaded roller or wedge, and tensioned by being pulled through. The channel is mirrored on the opposite side of the Gripple wire joiner, allowing a second piece of wire to be joined.

By orienting the channel of a Gripple wire joiner vertically and using it with wire rope, it makes a convenient suspension system capable of holding up substantial loads, and this has given rise to a range of Gripple suspension systems, which are sold to the construction industry worldwide.

Thousands of Gripple wire joiners hold together the Great Dingo Fence in Australia, the world's longest fence. The company produces over 30 million Gripple wire joiners per year.

These are also used extensively in the sport of orienteering as a form of security for the controls, particularly in urban environments.

== Images ==
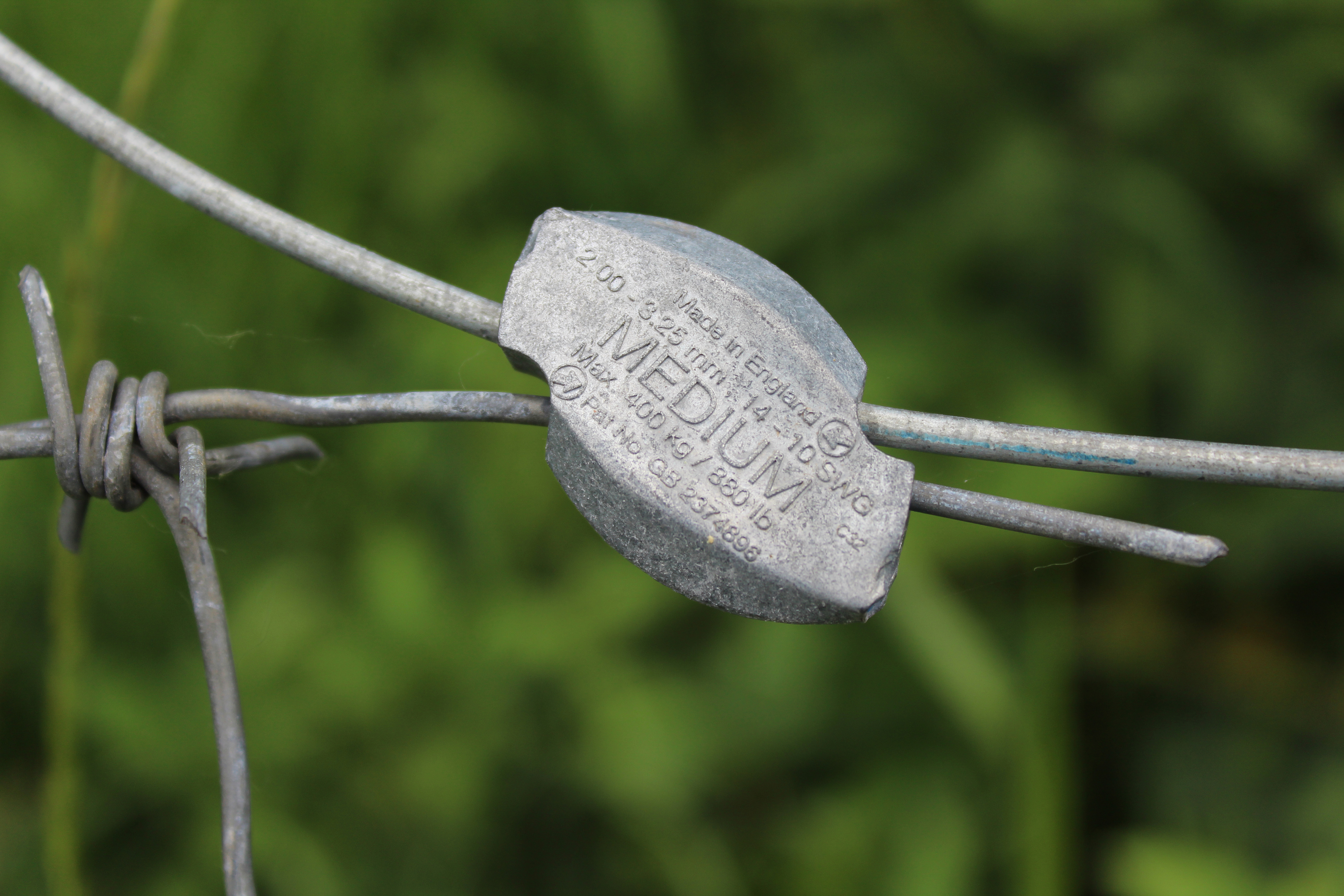
The rear of a Gripple wire joiner, with technical information including wire gauge, safe working load and the patent number

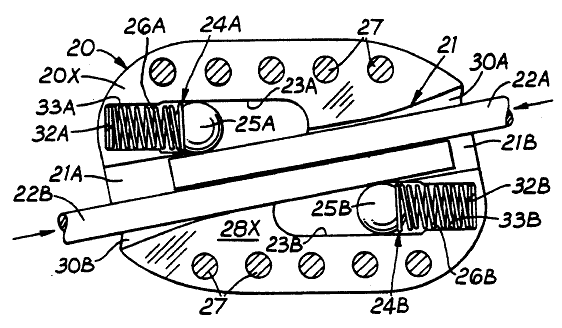
Operation of the Gripple wire joiner; wires being inserted

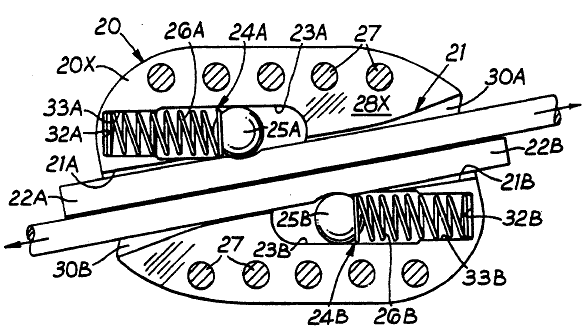
Operation of the Gripple wire joiner; wires pulled tight

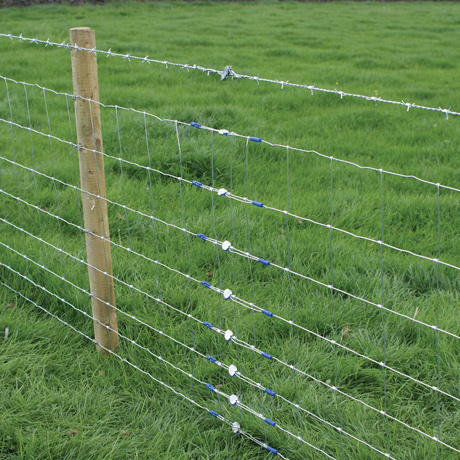
Gripple wire joiners used to repair a fence

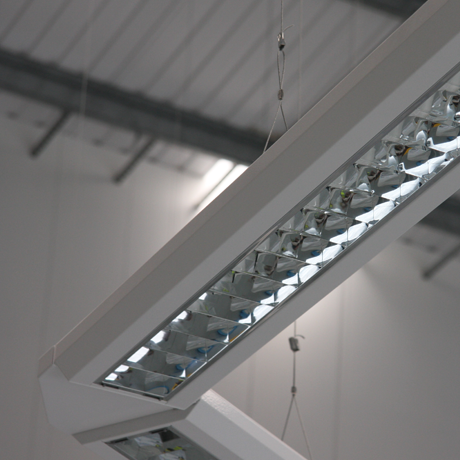
The Gripple product range evolved when the joiner was rotated through 90˚ and combined with wire rope to support substantial loads and suspend a variety of industrial applications, such as lighting, piping, HVAC, false ceilings and signage.

== See also ==
- List of companies in Sheffield
