= Ancon =

British stainless steel product manufacturer

Ancon Ltd
- Company type: Private
- Industry: Building
- Founded: 1882
- Founder: George Clark
- Headquarters: Sheffield, United Kingdom
- Key people: Rune Magnusson (Managing Director)
- Products: Stainless Steel
- Owner: CRH plc
- Number of employees: 600
- Website: www.ancon.co.uk

Ancon Ltd is a company that designs and manufactures stainless steel products for the construction industry founded and still based in Sheffield, United Kingdom. The main products being "Wall Tie", and brickwork support systems. Ancon is part of the CRH Group. The total workforce is around 600 employees.

Some projects Ancon has worked on include the Cholera Monument in Sheffield UK, The Lighthouse in Salford Quays UK, One London Wall in London UK, a Buddhist Temple in New York USA, and the Marousi Train Station in Athens, Greece.

== Brief history ==
Ancon is the result of mergers between several companies including George Clark, Ancon Stainless Steel Fixings in 1993 and CCL Systems acquired in 1998. George Clark of Sheffield was founded in 1882 and Ancon Stainless Steel Fixings was founded in 1971. The firm also acquired Harris and Edgar based in Epsom Surrey.

Following these merges the Ancon Head Office was relocated to a purpose-built premises located at President Way in Sheffield. Ancon went on to be sold to Tyco and was acquired by CRH plc in 2008.

== Overseas representation ==
Ancon-branded products are supplied worldwide through offices in United Kingdom, Switzerland, Austria, Germany, Australia, New Zealand and the United Arab Emirates and via a large network of distributors.

== Product range ==
The company supplies the specialist parts that hold modern building together, and support the cladding systems and masonry with long lasting non corroding Stainless steel, such as:

- Restraint fixings
- Stainless steel wall ties
- Wind posts
- Reinforcing bar couplers
- Shear connectors

== See also ==
- List of companies in Sheffield
