= Ken Hawley =

British tool specialist (1927–2014)

Ken Hawley MBE (born Kenneth Wybert Hawley, 29 June 1927 – 15 August 2014) was a British tool specialist and industrial historian: he was a tool retailer, collector of tools and authority on the history of Sheffield manufacturing trades. He amassed what is recognised as one of the most significant collections of its type in the world. The Hawley Collection is now housed at Kelham Island Museum in Sheffield, England.

== Life and career ==
Kenneth Wybert Hawley was born on the Manor estate in Sheffield on 29 June 1927 to Walter and Isabella Hawley. His father was a wire-worker who set up his own business, Wire Products, making wire guards for machinery in Sheffield's manufacturing industries. The family moved to the Wadsley area of the city in 1932, and to a newly built semi-detached house in the same area in 1939 where Hawley lived for the remainder of his life.

Hawley attended Marlcliffe County Infant and Junior School, Wisewood Secondary School and in 1940 gained entrance to Sheffield Junior Technical School. He left school a year later at the age of fourteen to assist in his father's business, which needed people to replace those workers who had been called up to the armed forces during World War 2.

Through his father's business, Hawley was exposed to many industrial workshops in the city as he took measurements and designed solutions for customers. The experience gave him an enduring respect for those who worked in the Sheffield cutlery and tool-manufacturing industries, which were then still famous throughout the world; it also instilled in him an abiding curiosity for how they had achieved their status and produced their wares.

Hawley then spent some time in the British Army under the compulsory National Service scheme. Upon being released in 1947, he became a tool salesman, working firstly for Sheffield hardware firm Wilkes Bros., then for Joseph Gleave of Manchester, and then becoming shop manager for tool merchants J. Rhodes & Sons in Rotherham. He married Emily in 1953; the couple had two sons.

In 1959, Hawley established his own specialist tool shop in Sheffield, advertising it with the slogan "We sell nowt but tools" to distinguish it from ironmongers and general hardware stores. (Note: Hawley was not shy of using the vernacular or speaking his mind. He once told a construction worker that the cold chisel being used to do a job was so blunt that "You could ride bare-arsed to London on that.")

Hawley ceased his involvement in his tool shop in 1989. He was awarded an Honorary Fellowship by Sheffield Hallam University in 1995 and was appointed a MBE in 1998. The latter honour was bestowed for his forty-year involvement as, according to several obituaries, the "driving force" behind restoration of Wortley Top Forge, a 17th-century finery forge and ironworks that has been restored by volunteers who were inspired by him. He was also a founder member and President of the Tools and Trades History Society.

Ken Hawley died on 15 August 2014; he was survived by his wife and sons.

== Collecting ==
Hawley said that he had no interest in history until 1950, when he visited a customer to demonstrate a machine. While at the customer's premises, he noticed a joiner's brace of a design that he had not seen before and was able to acquire it. Perhaps the most significant single development to his collection came in 1965 when he paid a business visit to the William Marples company and discovered that the firm's plane-manufacturing workshop was being closed. The Marples company was the last maker of a specific type of wooden plane and Hawley asked whether he could have some examples. According to Simon Barley, writing an obituary in The Guardian:

Before long he was carting off the entire contents of the workshop in his Volvo estate. "The only thing left was the benches," he said, and after a phone call to the owner he took those as well.

But more than just collect the artefacts, what Hawley realised was that knowledge of the skills of wooden moulding plane-making would be lost with retirement of Albert Boch, the last plane maker at Marples. So, he recruited two cine-camera enthusiasts to help him film Albert Boch making a plane from start to finish; and he went on to make other short films showing surviving makers in a range of tool manufacturing trades in their working environment before they became extinct. He also considered trade catalogues and other ancillary items an important record and illustration of the range of products, many of which have no surviving examples, and these were added to his acquisitions .

As time passed, Hawley became known for uttering the phrase, "You'll not be wanting this, will you?" The Sheffield tool-making industry went into decline due to changes both in the economy and in technology and he acquired a reputation as the person to approach when a business was closing. His knowledge, which was bolstered by an interest in researching the disappearing skills, enabled him to select those items that were worthy of adding to his collection.

The extent of the Hawley Collection was matched by the extent of his knowledge regarding it. It comprises over 70,000 tools, mostly but not entirely from Sheffield, as well as catalogues and other documents. The tools include many examples of such things as planes, table knives, anvils, files, taps and dies, rules, micrometres, scissors, hammers, handsaws, and vernier and caliper gauges. He stored these in two garden sheds, then in his garage. The garage was eventually turned into a two-storey building to provide more space, and he also used his attic as well as space begged from other people. (Note: The total number of objects in the collection exceeds 100,000.) Hawley spread his knowledge among a team of volunteers who both assisted in cataloguing the collection and in some cases became experts in their own right. He also co-authored books on various aspects of the Sheffield steel industries and took part in many interviews that have since been transcribed.

The Hawley Collection first came into public prominence following a meeting in 1991 with Janet Barnes, who was then Director of the Ruskin Gallery in Sheffield. An exhibition titled The Cutting Edge was arranged that drew upon the material and this led to the formation of the Ken Hawley Collection Trust, whose objective was to acquire and conserve it. Funding from the Heritage Lottery Fund (HLF) and support from the University of Sheffield led to the collection being transferred to premises at the university around 1998–99. It was officially recognised as a museum in 2002. A further, much larger HLF grant in 2008 allowed more spacious and specialist premises to be formed by converting buildings at Kelham Island Museum in the city. Those premises opened in 2010 and were extended in 2012; a third phase of development has been proposed. The collection is, according to Barley, "widely recognised as one of the best places to learn about tools and tool-making anywhere in the world". In September 2020 the Hawley Collection announced a project to trace the descendants Sheffield's famous knife makers.

== Publications ==
Among Hawley's publications are:

- A Cut above the Rest – the Heritage of Sheffield's Blade Manufactures (2003), with Joan Unwin
- Sheffield Images – Cutlery, Silver and Edge Tools, with Joan Unwin
- Wooden Spokeshaves (2007), with Denis Watts
- Knifemaking in Sheffield and the Hawley Collection, with Ruth Grayson
