= Kroto Innovation Centre =

- Interactive map of the Kroto Innovation Centre area

General information
- Type: Education
- Location: Sheffield, England
- Coordinates: 53°22′59.3″N 1°28′45.5″W

The Kroto Innovation Centre is an innovation centre for small and medium enterprises at the University of Sheffield. The centre is collocated in the Nanoscience building with the EPSRC Centre for III-V technologies. The centre is named after Sir Harry Kroto and the building is owned and managed by the University of Sheffield.

== History ==
The Kroto Innovation Centre opened in 2007 and was funded by the European Regional Development Fund, Objective 1 South Yorkshire and The University of Sheffield as a space for emerging technology and nanoscale technology small and medium enterprises to work alongside University of Sheffield academics. It is the accompanying space to the Sheffield Bioincubator and was intended for early stage businesses as part of the Sheffield city region emerging technology cluster. Its purpose is to provide commercial links and access to Research and Development at the University of Sheffield.

== Nanoscience ==
The Engineering and Physical Sciences Research Council national centre for III-V technologies creates III-V epitaxial materials, structures and devices in a university environment. As well as the University of Sheffield its partners include the University of Cambridge, the University of Glasgow and the University of Nottingham. The University of Sheffield site is the main physical space for the partnership.

== Notable partnerships ==
The centre is home to the Siemens Wind Power Research Centre which carries out innovative research into wind power.

Another notable company based at the centre is Ossila Ltd, who have partnered with the University of Sheffield and other universities on a variety of projects, including a commission from the National Tsing Hua University to create the Fast Automated Characterization of Transistors System in 2013 to accelerate organic electronics research in Semiconductor device fabrication and polymer testing.

== See also ==
- Sheffield Bioincubator
