= Ella Armitage Building =

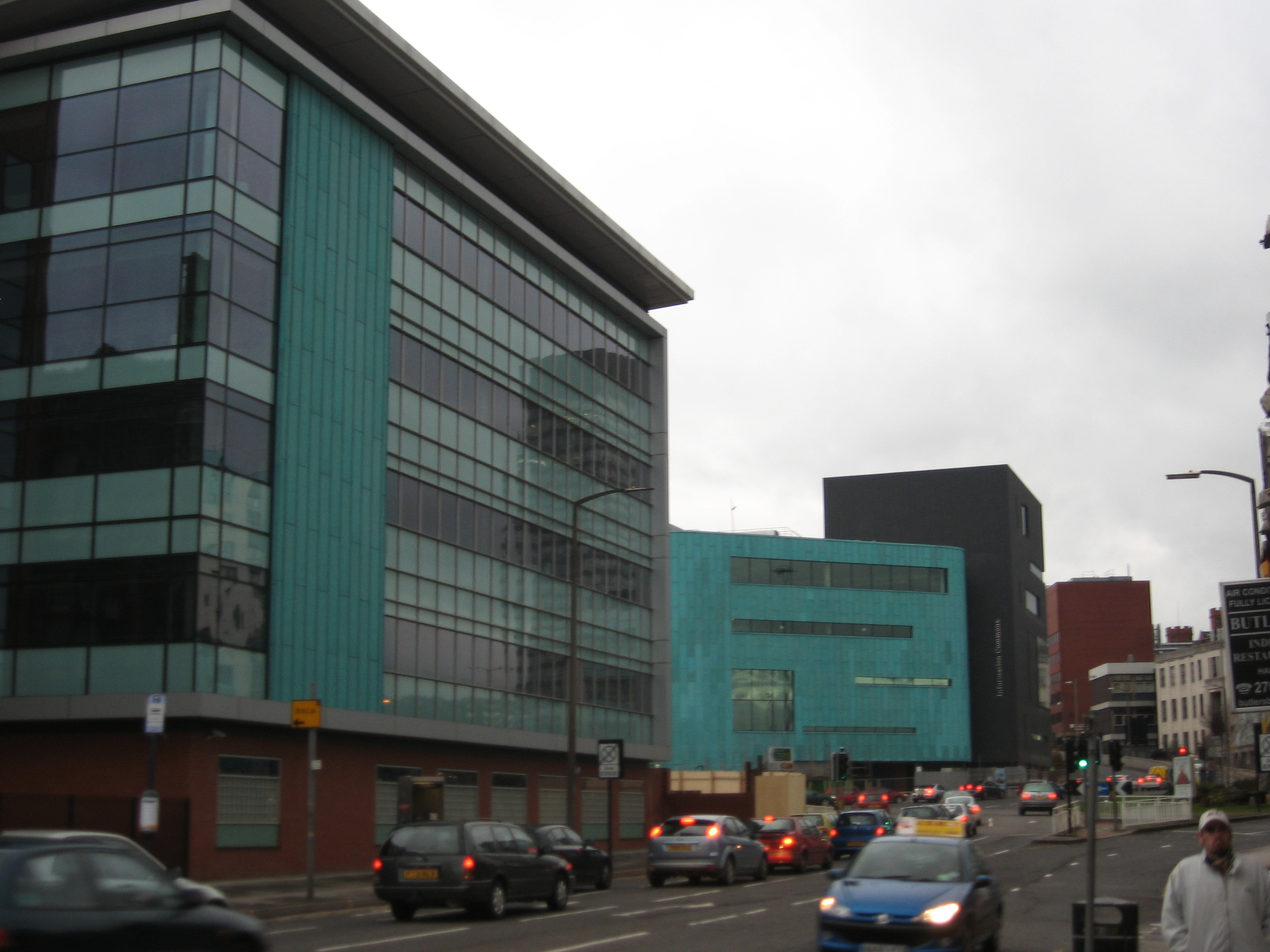
- The Ella Armitage Building, viewed from Brook Hill

- Location within South Yorkshire

General information
- Status: Completed
- Type: Education
- Location: Sheffield, England
- Coordinates: 53.3817°N 1.4833°W
- Completed: 2004

Height
- Roof: 35 m (115 ft)

Technical details
- Floor count: 5 (excluding service floors)
- Lifts/elevators: 1

Design and construction
- Architect: Bond Bryan Architects
- Developer: Kier Construction
- Services engineer: Services Design Associates Ltd

Other information
- Public transit: B Y University of Sheffield

The Ella Armitage Building, formerly known as the Sheffield Bioincubator is a former innovation centre in Sheffield, England. It contained offices and laboratories for small and medium enterprises in emerging technology and related areas and with links to the University of Sheffield. The building is owned, managed and run by the University of Sheffield. The building was closed to commercial activity in 2017 and was incorporated into the University of Sheffield's teaching and research space and renamed the Ella Armitage Building. The building houses the modern languages teaching centre, Grantham Centre and the Department of Archaeology.

The building is named after Ella Sophia Armitage, a famous English Archaeologist, as the building houses the Department of Archaeology.

== History ==
Following policy changes by the UK government in the 1990s, an increasing number of technology incubators specialising in biotechnology were established in regions outside of the so-called "Golden Triangle" of Oxford-London-Cambridge. Many of these appeared on the M1 corridor, where Sheffield also lies.

The Bioincubator was opened in February 2006 by Lord Sainsbury as a focus for bioscience and technology entrepreneurship in the Sheffield City Region. It was funded by the European Regional Development Fund, Sheffield University (approximately £6.9 million) and Yorkshire Forward. The development was intended to assist the growth of an emerging technology and bioscience cluster in the Sheffield City Region. It provided a physical space for partners to work with the University of Sheffield, a Russell Group research institution. It was one of the seven biotechnology incubators in Northern England at the time. The first tenant in the facility was Biofusion, a company specialising in intellectual property commercialisation for life sciences. In 2007 its partner building the Kroto Innovation Centre was opened.

The Bioincubator is a British steel frame building and has five storeys, measuring approximately 20m x 29m, with a total floor area of 2800 m^{2}. All floors have a height of 3.875m, except for the ground floor at 3.975m. At the time, it was classified as a medium-sized bioincubator.

== Notable partnerships ==
The concept of using electrical impedance spectroscopy to detect oral cancer was found to have positive results through preliminary testing. It was presented to the Annual Meeting of the American Academy of Oral Medicine in 2013 by Professor Martin Thornhill from Sheffield University. The concept was the outcome of a research collaboration between commercial Bioincubator tenant Zilico, Sheffield University and the Sheffield Teaching Hospitals NHS Foundation Trust.

== See also ==
- Bioincubator
- Kroto Innovation Centre
