= Windpost =

A windpost is a structural item used in the design and construction of masonry walls to increase lateral wall stability and protect them against damage from horizontal forces imposed by wind pressure, crowd or handrail loads. They are normally constructed from mild steel channel sections, supported at the head and the foot between floor slab levels and/or the principal steelwork sections forming the structural frame of the building. In cavity walls, the windpost will typically be fixed into the inner and outer leafs of the wall by specialist fixings and fastenings at regular intervals along its length. The windposts will be spaced along the walls of the building at regular intervals as calculated by the engineer to suit the required loadings.

In most cases a windpost is a large and very unwieldy element that can often weigh in excess of 400 kg. The manufacture and delivery of both steel and concrete windposts has a significant carbon footprint and once delivered to site, their storage requires large areas to be set aside. The procurement of windposts, including the design process, often requires a lead time of four to five weeks. The length and weight of windposts makes them particularly difficult to manoeuvre into position in confined spaces. When installed as part of an internal wall, significant health and safety risks exist for the installers in lifting the windpost to its vertical position. There is no recognised mechanical lifting method to safely erect windposts.

The properties of steel windposts have inherent fire integrity, acoustic, air tightness and thermal movement issues, all of which require additional measures to achieve specification compliance at extra cost.

== Design methods and alternatives ==
Windposts are designed to span vertically, floor to floor and provide lateral support for masonry wall panels. The windposts will usually be restrained by the brickwork and designed as simply supported beams.

As an alternative to steel windposts, when the primary structure is composed of reinforced concrete, secondary structures are cast in situ to provide lateral support to masonry panels.

Traditional design methods are often not optimised for the design of masonry panels with openings, and therefore windposts can be over specified on walls where the design capacity may not be utilised. Using alternative design methods such as advanced yield line analysis, the specification of wind posts within masonry wall panels can often be optimised and often omitted. These calculations can be typically carried out by structural engineering software packages such as MasterSeries.

Recently, a new innovative technique of reinforcing blockwork walls has been developed by Wembley Innovation Ltd and used in many Crossrail projects in the UK. It consists of using uniquely designed hollow blocks to allow the construction of reinforced concrete beams (Wi Beams) and columns (Wi Columns) within the blockwork construction, which eliminate the need for traditional windposts or lintels. This new technique maximises masonry wall strength without thickening the wall or harming its appearance and allows the architects to design and create uninterrupted blockwork panels with flexible detailing options, whilst retaining the performance characteristics of traditional masonry such as fire integrity, acoustic performance and air permeability. This modular approach also provides the adaptability for contractors to make late changes to construction without affecting the build programme and creates seamless walls which do not require any fire protection.
