= Richlyn Systems =

British software company

Richlyn Systems Ltd
- Type: Limited
- Industry: Software, Websites
- Headquarters: Sheffield, South Yorkshire, UK
- Number of employees: 8
- Website: http://www.richlyn.co.uk

Richlyn Systems is a UK-based software and website development company. It was incorporated in 1983 and is based in The Gateway at Sheffield. The company developed a Property Integrated Management and Accounting System (PIMS) which is now used by many companies including Valad Property Group, HBOS, Evans Easyspace, Evans Property Group and Wykeland Property Group.

The company has continued to develop other systems - Integrated Stock Control Order Processing and Accounting System (SCOPAC) and Integrated Paint Manufacturing System (IPMS) - are the latest additions to its software portfolio.

In 2003 Richlyn, at the request of its clients formed a website development team to provide data driven websites to operate with client's data in real time. In 2007 Richlyn was approached to maintain and develop the FRAX and NOGG websites at the request of Sheffield University. Richlyn has also developed a number of websites for dental practices nationwide.
