= William Whiteley and Sons =

British cutlery manufacturer

William Whiteley and Sons is a cutlery manufacturer based in Sheffield, England. The company is considered the oldest scissor manufacturer in the Western world.

== History ==
William Whiteley and Sons was founded in 1760, and has been situated in Sheffield since 1787. A royal warrant was issued in 1840.

The company has been featured on Salvage Hunters and Antiques Road Trip.
