= Traditional trades =

Category of building trades

Traditional trades (known also as traditional building trades and preservation trades) is a loosely defined categorization of building trades who actively practice their craft in respect of historic preservation, heritage conservation, or the conserving and maintenance of the existing built environment. Though traditional trade practitioners may at times be involved in new construction, the emphasis of the categorization is toward work on existing structures, regardless of their age or their historic value, with a specific interest in replication or conservation of the original results and craft techniques.

== Trade technologies ==
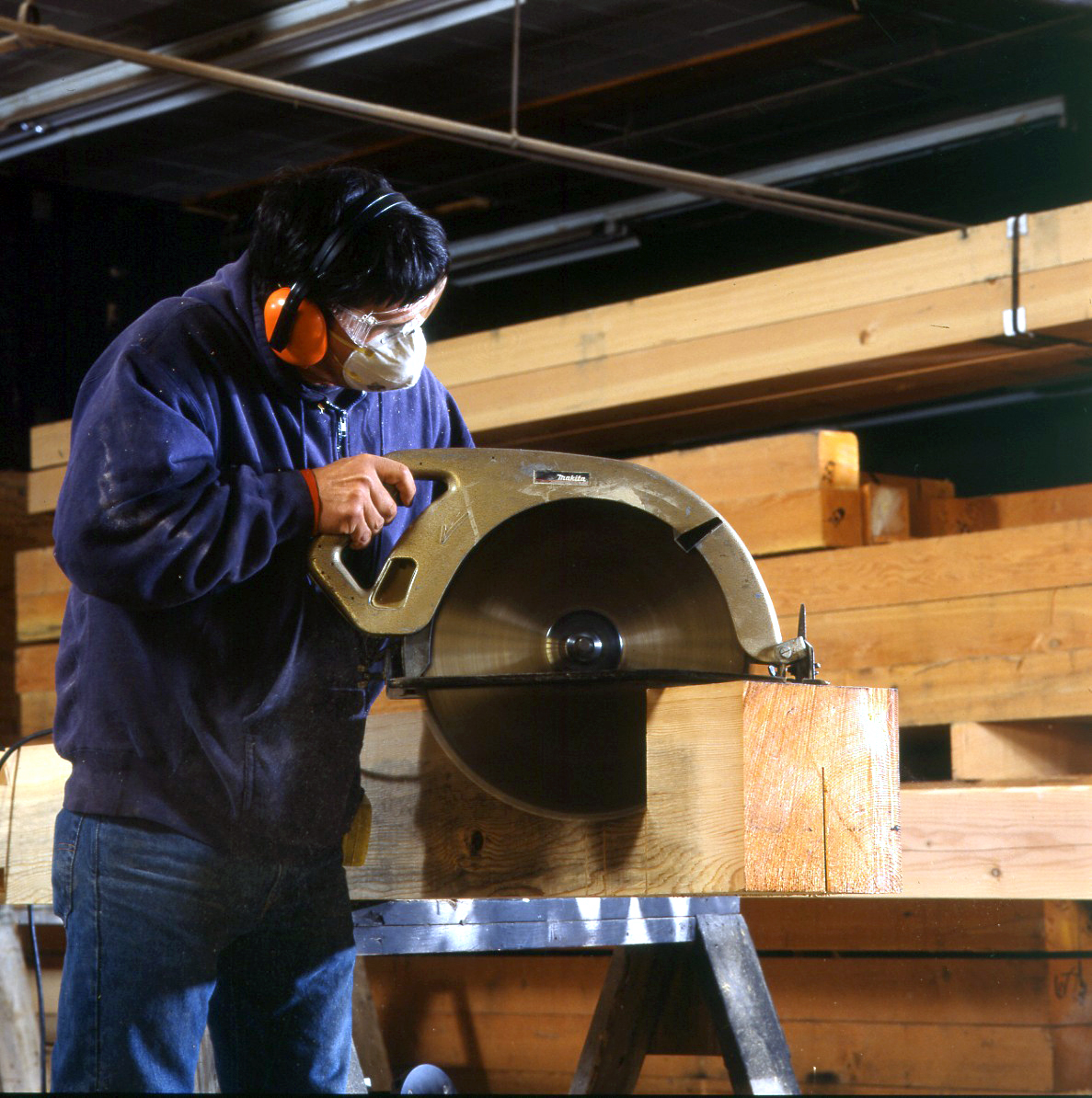
Modern timber framers incorporate new technologies, like the circular saw shown here, to increase productivity and reduce labor costs and time.

Traditional building trades commonly include masonry, timber framing, log building, traditional roofing, upholstery, carpentry and joinery, sometimes plumbing, plasterwork, painting, blacksmithing, and ornamental metal working (Bronze and brass). In addition to "hands-on" skills and knowledge of building processes, traditional trade practitioners incorporate knowledge of historic preservation, materials science, historic architecture, and procuring replacement materials. Contemporary practitioners of traditional trades must also avail themselves of modern technologies, current materials science, and 21st century construction project management.

The work performed by these practitioners is not only essential to the maintenance of the historic built environment, but also to the preservation of the traditional trade skills and knowledge themselves. In many cases, traditional trade skills and techniques date back centuries. Traditional trades such as carpenters and timber framers; masons, plasterers, lime burners, and brick makers; painters; blacksmiths; and slate, metal, shingle, tile, and thatch roofers, are anecdotally said to be “dying” arts. While it is true that some techniques of the past are not well enough understood, it is also true that these crafts have been practiced continuously all over the world without dying at all.

Traditional trades not only restore and help to maintain buildings, but also stabilize priceless archaeological sites, and in doing so, help us understand the techniques used at places like Cuzco, Stonehenge, and Angkor Wat. Such trades are not solely practiced for the conservation of monumental heritage sites and can be applied to conserve vernacular sites such as barns.

== Materials technologies ==
The traditional trades focus on preservation of the knowledge of craft work specific to historic building technologies and traditional/non-traditional building materials. Traditional building materials and traditional trade technologies are commonly associated with a host of materials, but not limited to, stone, brick, terra cotta, adobe, cork, leather, timber and log, bamboo, thatch, slate and metal roofing, fine and vernacular carpentry, ornamental plaster (scagliola), stained glass, window and door restoration, wood refinishing, painting, cast iron and wrought iron. In what may at times be considered non-traditional materials are found trades such as chandelier and lighting restoration where you have to be somewhat of a jack-of-all-trades with an understanding of electricity, and knowledgeable with properties and finishes of metals, glass, and optics. As an example of the mix of new and old materials, the art of restoration of mobile residential trailers requires a number of traditional trade skills associated with traditional and contemporary materials in a manner not dissimilar to those hand-work skills and preservation approaches required to restore an historic automobile, a biplane, rocket ship or steam locomotive.

== Green trades ==
Traditional building technologies tend towards a closer relationship of the built environment to an in-practice understanding, interaction and use of natural resources and recycled or salvaged building materials than is common in the practice of modern and contemporary building technologies.

For example: a traditional timber framer in search of difficult-to-acquire materials with which to rebuild heritage structures will tend to seek out an understanding of forest management, tree harvest, conversion process and building design and technique. These integrated skills and their supportive knowledge base both in scale and localization are readily adaptable to strategies of sustainable new-build economies.

Old buildings and structures were built once, energy and natural resources previously expended, and to adaptively re-use or recycle them often requires an understanding and appreciation of not only how the older materials with which they were built work together in a structure, but a need to understand the techniques by which these materials were originally worked, and an understanding of how they can most optimally be worked now.

== Knowledge of process ==
As opposed to an emphasis on materials science (as with an architectural conservator) the primary orientation of a traditional trade practitioner tends toward the in-process work activity and physical interaction and intervention with the building materials and the coordination, education and project management of in-field work teams.

== Team members ==
Traditional trades are quite often team members with architectural conservators, preservation architects and structural engineers in both the design phase investigation of heritage sites as well as involved directly in the undertaking of the hands-on restoration process. Traditional trades as a resource to the historic preservation industry provide a physical grounding in feasibility, construction logic, field and site logistics, reference to skilled traditional trades practitioners, estimate and budget considerations.

== Availability ==
Skilled traditional trades practitioners are generally available to preservationists and property stewards who give themselves a chance to find them. Besides the Internet and verbal networking, information about traditional trades can be found through trade associations and training programs, both private and governmental. If a particular job is limited to union workers, the union should provide workers with the appropriate skills or else allow an exception for a particular task.

A traditional trades practitioner may also be able to recommend experts in related skills, as well as promote good communications among the different disciplines at work on any given project.

== Education ==
Basic levels of training in contemporary building and craft skills are a prerequisite to specialization in traditional trades work. Individuals with an interest in learning a traditional trade can seek out learning opportunities either through formal vocational programs or through informal mentorship in at-work field practice under the tutelage of a traditional trade practitioner.

Family businesses, trade unions, historic preservation businesses, government programs (National Park Service Historic Preservation Training Center), college programs, religious and non-profit organizations are areas where an interest to provide education of traditional trade practice can often be found. As the individual increases in skill, learning will come from study, from workshops, from travel and personal contacts, and from clues found in the work itself.

Some individual tradespeople provide training opportunities for their fellow tradespeople without a close association with the larger educational institutions.

Individuals providing trades training include:

John Leeke's Historic HomeWorks

Steve Quillian, Historic Homes Workshop

Amy McAuley, Oculus

Kelsie Gray

Institutions providing trades education programs include:

The Preservation Education Institute

Belmont Tech

College of the Redwoods

Savannah College of Art & Design

American College of the Building Arts

North Bennet Street School

Pine Mountain Settlement School

Organizations providing trades education resources, and hands-on workshops include:

Preservation Trades Network

- In England are the Heritage Skills HUB, The Society for the Protection of Ancient Buildings, and The Sustainable Traditional Buildings Alliance.
- In Europe are the Gewerbe Akademie in Rottweil Germany; Compagnons du Devoir in France, Telford College in Scotland, and masonry trades programs in Ireland.
- International Trades Education Symposia (ITES) have been held in 2005 at Belmont Technical College in Ohio and in 2007 in Telborg, Sweden. These symposia deal with the availability and quality of traditional trades education programs worldwide.

== See also ==
- Historic preservation
- Museum of Early Trades and Crafts
- Primitive skills
