= Glenesk distillery =

Scottish distillery

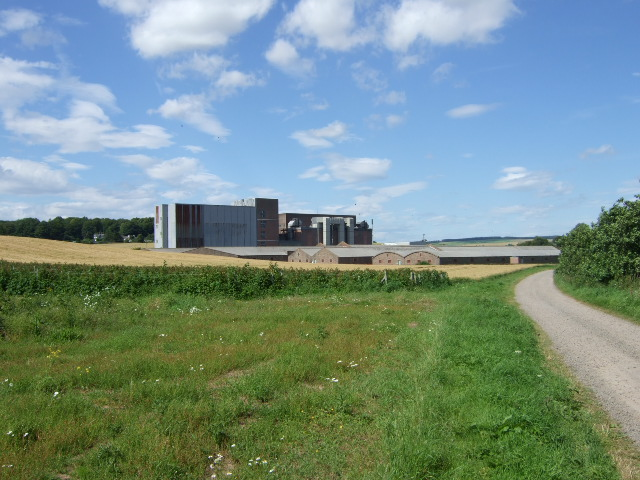

Region: Highland
- Location: Montrose, Angus, Scotland
- Coordinates: 56°44′37″N 2°27′49″W
- Owner: Diageo
- Founded: 1897
- Founder: James Isle
- Status: Closed/demolished
- Water source: North Esk river
- Mothballed: 1985-1996
- Demolished: 1996

Glenesk distillery (formerly Highland Esk distillery, North Esk distillery, Montrose distillery and Hillside distillery) was a Highland single malt Scotch whisky distillery located near Montrose, Angus, Scotland.

== History ==
Glen Albyn distillery was founded in 1897 by the Dundee wine merchant James Isle as Highland Esk distillery having been converted from a flax mill.

In 1899, JF Caille took over the distillery and renamed it North Esk distillery.

The distillery was closed during the First World War but reopened afterward.

In 1938, North Esk distillery was bought by Associated Scottish Distilleries Ltd. (ASD), a subsidiary of Train & McIntyre Ltd., itself owned by National Distillers of America, re-equipped to produce grain whisky and renamed as Montrose Distillery

In 1954, Associated Scottish Distilleries sold the distillery to Distillers Company Ltd. (DCL). During this time, only the warehouses and maltings were used.

In 1964, the site was again converted to produce malt whisky and renamed Hillside distillery. Four stills were added.

In 1980, Hillside distillery was renamed Glenesk distillery, licensed to William Sanderson & Sons Ltd., and used in the Vat 69 blended whisky.

In 1985, DLC mothballed the distillery, and in 1996, the stills were removed, and all buildings, except for maltings, were demolished.
