= Glenlochy distillery =

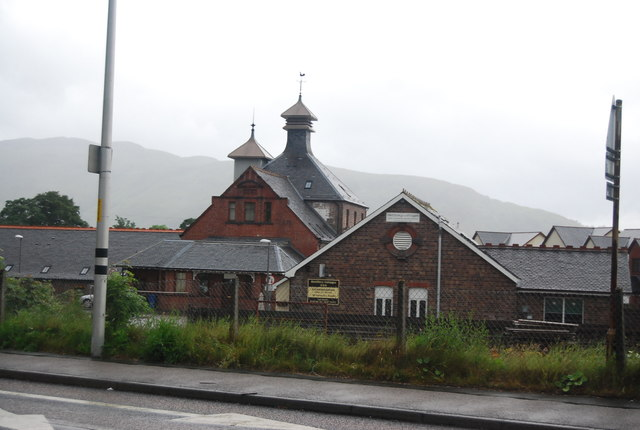
- Location: Fort William, Scotland
- Coordinates: 56°49′20″N 5°05′40″W
- Owner: Diageo
- Founded: 1898
- Status: Closed/demolished
- Water source: River Nevis
- Demolished: 1991

Glenlochy distillery was a Highland single malt Scotch whisky distillery in Fort William, Scotland.

== History ==
Glenlochy distillery was founded in 1898 by David McAndie of Nairn. It was built in Fort William, Scotland. It was located on the banks of the River Nevis, which provided a good supply of water.

Glenlochy closed in 1919 after the First World War, which had disrupted production, and remained inactive for about two decades. It reopened in 1937 after being acquired by the Canadian entrepreneur Joseph Hobbs and continued production until World War II.

In 1954, the distillery was sold to Distillers Company Ltd (DCL). Glenlochy was closed in 1983 due to over-supply of whisky. The site was sold for redevelopment in 1991 and most of the buildings were demolished.
