= Glenury distillery =

Scotch whiskey distillery

Coordinates: 56°58′20.5″N 02°12′52.5″W

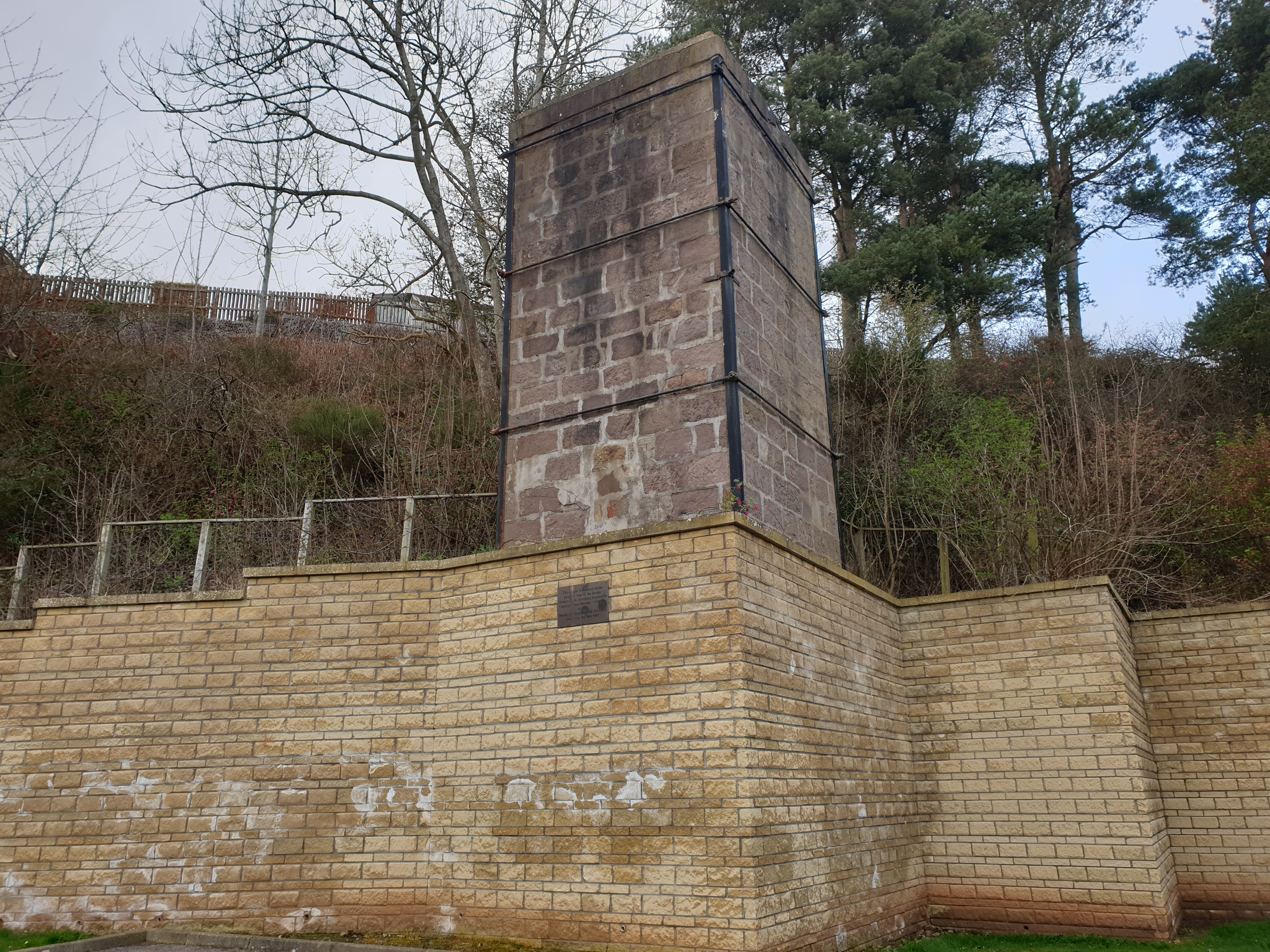
- Preserved chimney base from the distillery
- Location: Stonehaven, Scotland
- Owner: Diageo
- Founded: 1825
- Status: Closed/demolished
- Water source: River Cowie
- No. of stills: 2 wash, 2 spirit

Glenury distillery (also known as Glenury Royal) was a Highland single malt Scotch whisky distillery in Stonehaven, Scotland

Glenury operated under a number of different owners between 1825 and 1985, when it closed for the final time.

== History ==
The distillery was founded by Robert Barclay in 1825, taking its name from the glen that runs through the Ury district. Weeks after opening, a fire destroyed stocks of barley, along with the kiln and parts of the malting floor. Two weeks after the fire, worker James Clark died in an accident with the boiler. Robert Barclay died in 1854, and the distillery was auctioned to William Richie three years later.

The maltings of Glenury Royal were closed in 1968. The distillery then kept producing malt whisky for almost two more decades, but eventually it was mothballed in May 1985 by The Distillers Company.

In 1992 the owners decided to cease the malt whisky production at Glenury Royal for good. The buildings of the distillery were sold in 1993 to a property company who turned part of these buildings into apartments.

In 2003 Diageo released a 50yo official bottling; only 498 bottles were produced. A limited release of a 36yo bottling (ABV 51.2%) was released in 2005, and the size of this batch was 2100 bottles.

== Present day ==
The base of the chimney from the distillery still exists today, though the chimney itself has been demolished.
