= Glen Albyn distillery =

1846–1988 whisky distillery in Scotland

Glen Albyn
Region: Highland
- Location: Inverness; 57.481629°N 4.247189°W
- Owner: Oliver Haiste
- Founded: 1846
- Status: Closed/demolished
- Water source: Loch Ness
- Mothballed: 1850 to 1852, 1866 to 1884, 1917 to 1919, 1983 to 1988
- Demolished: 1988

Glen Albyn distillery was a Highland single malt Scotch whisky distillery in Inverness, Scotland.

It operated from 1846 to 1983. Glen Albyn whisky brand was relaunched in 2022.

== History ==
Glen Albyn distillery was founded in 1846 by James Sutherland, who was Provost of Inverness at the time.

Glen Albyn was closed by The Distillers Company in 1983 and was demolished in 1988.

Glen Albyn whisky brand was relaunched in December 2022 and its honorary president is Lord French, Baron de Freyne. The previous brand owner was the global multinational Diageo which is listed on the New York Stock Exchange with assets of $49 billion.

== Collectable Bottles ==
For much of its history most of Glen Albyn's produce was used for other blends so its single malt bottlings are very rare. As a result of this, it sells at international auction houses such as Sotheby's, Christie's, and Bonhams with individual bottles often fetching up to $4000 each.

In July 2022 a rare bottling of Glen Albyn from 1852 sold for a price of $132,000 to an anonymous American collector. It was signed by prime minister Benjamin Disraeli.
