= Glenugie distillery =

Whisky distillery in Scotland

Coordinates: 57°29′16.4″N 1°47′35.5″W

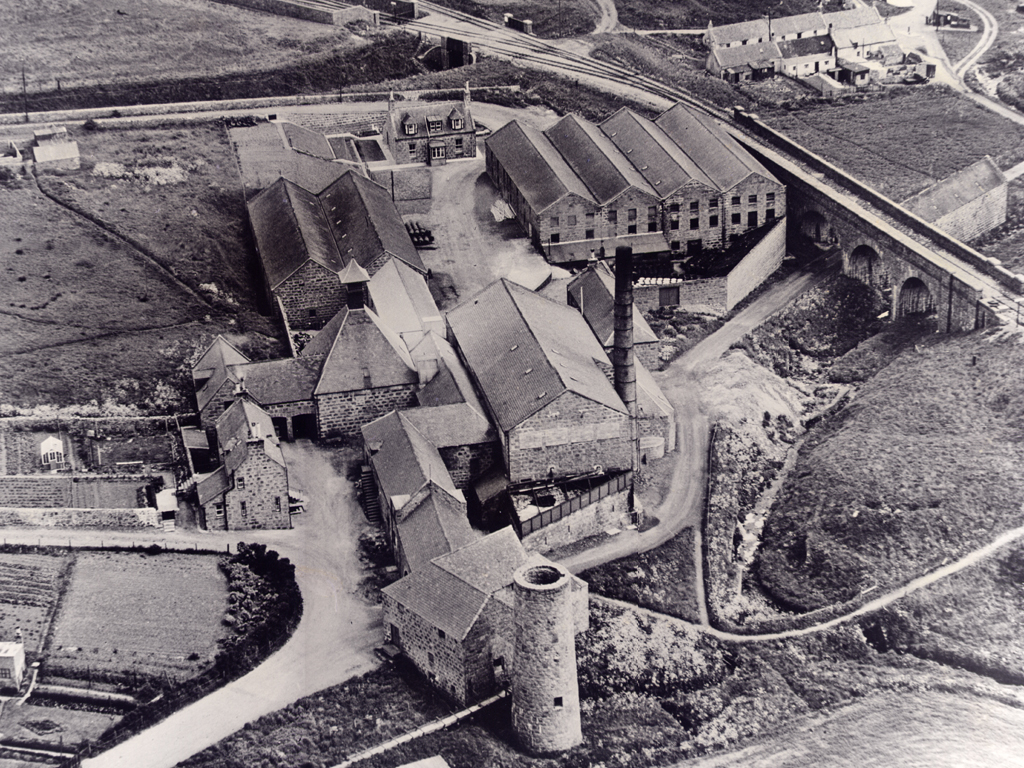
- Photo taken in 1956 of the Glenugie distillery

Region: Highland
- Location: Peterhead, Scotland
- Owner: Chivas Brothers
- Founded: 1831
- Status: Closed/demolished
- Water source: Wellington Spring
- No. of stills: 1 wash, 1 spirit
- Demolished: 1985

Glenugie distillery was a Highland single malt Scotch whisky distillery in Peterhead, Scotland.

It operated sporadically and under a number of different owners between 1831 and 1983, when it closed for the final time. The distillery's windmill tower is a Category B listed structure.

== History ==
The Glenugie Distillery was established in 1831 by Donald McLeod & Co Ltd and was originally called Invernettie. In 1884, Simon Forbes purchased the distillery and enjoyed some success with it. He operated it until 1915.

The distillery was silent for most of World War I, but opened for a short time in 1923-1924 as the Glenugie Distillery Ltd, but again remained silent from 1925 to 1937. Seager Evans & Co Ltd then re-opened it in 1937.

Scheney International acquired Seager Evans & Co Ltd in 1956 and decided to improve the equipment and used an oil system to replace the coal-fired boiler, as well as introducing a pair of new stills with condensers. This led to production doubling. The solution on the resultant strain on the workshop was to cease site malting and also to convert the malt house to warehouse space.

In 1875, Glenugie distillery was sold to Whitbread & Co a company later sold to Allied Domecq .

Glenugie was one of a number of distilleries that failed to continue past the 1983 market. This was because there was too much competition at the time, leading to about a dozen single malt distilleries closing in this year.

The distillery was demolished in 1985 and the premises were taken over by Score Group plc, who have built their workshops on this site.
