= North Port distillery =

Coordinates: 56°44′08″N 2°39′37″W

Region: Highland
- Location: Brechin, Angus
- Owner: Diageo
- Founded: 1820
- Status: Closed/demolished
- Water source: River South Esk
- Mothballed: 1983
- Demolished: 1994

North Port distillery was a Highland single malt Scotch whisky distillery in Brechin, Angus.

== History ==
Brothers David, John and Alexander Guthrie, members of a local farming family, founded the North Port Distillery in 1820 under the name Townhead Distillery and created the holding company, Townhead Distillery Company, as owner. The distillery was renamed Brechin Distillery in 1823, and in 1825, the holding company became Guthrie, Martin & Company. The Glencadam Distillery was founded in 1825, a few hundred yards from the North Port, and in a likely bid to avoid confusion, the Guthries changed the name of their facility from Brechin Distillery to North Port Distillery in 1839. Guthrie, Martin & Company became a limited company in 1893, and changed names to reflect this as Guthrie, Martin & Company Limited.

Distillers Company (DCL) and W.H. Holt & Company Limited purchased the distillery and its extensive stock in 1922 and around 1928, transferred it to DCL subsidiary Scottish Malt Distillers. The distillery was latterly operated by its subsidiary Mitchell Brothers.

Production at the distillery ceased for a period from about 1926–28 and lasting until 1937 when it resumed only to be halted again at the onset of World War II due to the fuel and barley rationing instituted by the government. Production resumed in 1948 and continued until DCL closed permanently the distillery in 1983.

The owners sold the site for re-development in 1990 and shortly afterwards, Safeway constructed a supermarket on the site. Somerfield purchased the store in October 2004 as part of a larger sale.

Bottlings of North Port Distillery Single Malt are still available.
