= The Distillers Company =

1877–1986 Scottish alcoholic beverages company

The Distillers Company plc
- Type: Public
- Industry: Drink industry
- Founded: 1877
- Defunct: 1986
- Fate: Acquired
- Successor: Guinness
- Headquarters: Edinburgh, Scotland
- Products: Scotch whisky
- Parent: Diageo

The Distillers Company plc was a Scotch whisky company based in Edinburgh, Scotland. It was taken over in 1986 by Guinness & Co. and is now part of Diageo.

== History ==
The Distillers Company origins lie in a trade association known as the Scotch Distillers' Association formed by Menzies, Barnard & Craig, John Bald & Co., John Haig & Co., MacNab Bros, Robert Mowbray and Macfarlane & Co. in 1865.

It was incorporated in 1877 as The Distillers Company Ltd. (DCL) and in 1894 DCL was listed on the Edinburgh and Glasgow stock exchanges.

During the early part of the 1900s, DCL embarked in programme of distillery acquisitions at low prices in the wake of the Pattisons crash of 1898.

In 1914 DCL claimed to be the largest whisky distiller in the world.

In 1919 DCL purchased the totality of John Haig & Co. and in 1925 combined it with John Walker & Son and Buchanan-Dewar on a share exchange basis.

In 1929 DCL took over White Horse Distillers Ltd.

During the 1930s, one product introduced by DCL was an alcohol addition to petrol, called Discol. This was a way to benefit from any excess alcohol production as the market and demand varied. The resultant fuel was cooler-burning and had a higher octane-rating than fuel without the additive.

in 1985 James Gulliver's Argyll Foods group, which operated the Glen Scotia distillery, launched a hostile bid for DCL. The offer was rejected and The Distillers Company was finally acquired by Guinness in 1986. The transaction was shadowed by controversy because it involved fraudulent activity, becoming known as the Guinness share-trading fraud.

DCL was renamed to United Distillers in 1987. In 1998 United Distillers was merged with International Distillers & Vintners to create United Distillers & Vintners (UDV), forming the spirits division of Diageo plc. The company still exists today as Diageo Scotland Ltd.

== Distilleries ==
Many malt distilleries were operated by DCL and most are still open under new owners:

=== Malt whisky distilleries ===
| Distillery | Founded | Owner |
|---|---|---|
| Aberfeldy | 1896 | John Dewar & Sons |
| Auchroisk | 1972 | Diageo |
| Adelphi | 1826 | Closed 1907; Demolished |
| Aultmore | 1895 | John Dewar & Sons |
| Balmenach | 1824 | Inver House Distillers |
| Banff | 1863 | Closed 1983; Demolished |
| Benrinnes | 1826 | Diageo |
| Benromach | 1898 | Gordon & MacPhail |
| Brora | 1819 | Diageo |
| Caol Ila | 1846 | Diageo |
| Cardhu | 1824 | Diageo |
| Clynelish | 1967 | Diageo |
| Coleburn | 1897 | Coleburn Distillery Ltd. |
| Convalmore | 1894 | William Grant & Sons |
| Cragganmore | 1869 | Diageo |
| Craigellachie | 1891 | John Dewar & Sons |
| Dailuaine | 1852 | Diageo |
| Dallas Dhu | 1898 | Historic Scotland |
| Dalwhinnie | 1898 | Diageo |
| Glen Albyn | 1846 | Closed 1983; Demolished |
| Glen Elgin | 1898 | Diageo |
| Glen Garioch | 1797 | Suntory Global Spirits |
| Glen Mhor | 1892 | Closed 1983; Demolished |
| Glen Ord | 1838 | Diageo |
| Glendullan | 1897 | Diageo |
| Glenesk | 1897 | Closed 1985; Demolished |
| Glenkinchie | 1837 | Diageo |
| Glenlochy | 1897 | Closed 1983; Demolished |
| Glenlossie | 1876 | Diageo |
| Glentauchers | 1897 | Chivas Brothers |
| Glenury | 1825 | Closed 1993; Demolished |
| Imperial | 1897 | Closed 1998; Demolished |
| Knockdhu | 1894 | Inver House Distillers |
| Lagavulin | 1816 | Diageo |
| Linkwood | 1821 | Diageo |
| Mannochmore | 1971 | Diageo |
| Millburn | 1807 | Closed 1985; Demolished |
| Mortlach | 1823 | Diageo |
| North Port | 1820 | Closed 1983; Demolished |
| Oban | 1794 | Diageo |
| Old Pulteney | 1826 | Inver House Distillers |
| Parkmore | 1894 | Edrington |
| Port Charlotte | 1829 | The Bruichladdich Distillery Co. Ltd |
| Port Ellen | 1825 | Diageo |
| Rosebank | 1798 | Ian Macleod Distillers |
| Royal Brackla | 1812 | John Dewar & Sons |
| Royal Lochnagar | 1845 | Diageo |
| Speyburn | 1897 | Inver House Distillers |
| St. Magdalene | 1798 | Closed 1983; Demolished |
| Talisker | 1830 | Diageo |
| Teaninich | 1817 | Diageo |
| Tobermory | 1798 | Distel |

=== Grain whisky distilleries ===
| Distillery | Location | Year closed |
|---|---|---|
| Caledonian | 1855 | Closed 1988; Demolished |
| Cambus | 1806 | Closed 1993; Converted into a cooperage site |
| Cameronbridge | 1824 | Diageo |
| Carsebridge | 1799 | Closed 1983; Demolished |
| Port Dundas | 1811 | Closed 2011; Demolished |

== Brands ==
The Distillers Company owned several blended whisky brands:

- Black & White
- Buchanan's
- Dewar's
- Haig
- Johnnie Walker
- J&B
- Logan
- Old Parr
- Vat 69
- White Horse.

== Other ==
=== Chemicals and plastics ===
Since 1915, during the World War I, Distillers supplied industrial alcohol for making explosives. In 1922, it started to manufacture Discol-branded motor fuel made from alcohol. In 1928, it formed together with Turner and Newall, the Carbon Dioxide Co Ltd for the sale of gas, a byproduct of their operations. In 1930, Distillers formed British Industrial Solvents for production of acids and other solvents from industrial alcohol. In 1933, it formed Gyproc Products which was sold to British Plaster Board in 1944. In 1937, Distillers acquired British Resin Products. In 1939, it acquired a controlling stake in Commercial Solvents and a 50% interest in BX Plastics, where full control was acquired in 1961. It followed by getting 48% shareholding in F. A. Hughes and Co. in 1941 and taking the full control in 1947. In 1947, F. A. Hughes and Co. was merged into British Resin.

In 1947, British Petroleum Chemicals was incorporated as a joint venture of Anglo-Iranian Oil Company and Distillers Company. In 1956, the company was renamed British Hydrocarbon Chemicals.

In 1945, Distillers formed a joint venture, British Geon, with B. F. Goodrich to produce polyvinyl chloride and in 1954 it started a partnership named Distrene with Dow Chemicals to produce polystyrene. In 1955, it took full control of Magnesium Elektron. In 1967, BP acquired chemical and plastic assets of The Distillers Company which were merged with British Hydrocarbon Chemicals to form BP Chemicals.

=== Pharmaceuticals ===
From 1942, Distillers Biochemicals (DCBL) operated an Agency Factory of the British Ministry of Supply manufacturing penicillin in Speke. The plant was one of the first two factories in Europe to produce penicillin. Following World War II, DCBL purchased the facility from the UK Government.

Distillers was also responsible for the manufacture of the drug Thalidomide in the United Kingdom. Thalidomide had been developed by Grunenthal with whom, in July 1957, DCBL signed a sixteen-year contract to market the drug. DCBL ordered 6,000 tablets for clinical trial and 500 grammes of pure substance for animal experiments and formulation. Thalidomide was marketed in the United Kingdom under the name Distaval, beginning on 14 April 1958. Advertisements emphasised the drug's complete safety, using phrases such as non-toxic and no known toxicity. Later, Thalidomide was marketed under the names Asmaval, Tensival, Valgis, and Valgraine and found to cause nerve damage and malformations in births.

The Speke site, also known as Speke Operations, was eventually sold to Eli Lilly and Company in 1963. In February 2022 it was acquired by TriRX.

== Directors of note ==
- Leonard Alsager Elgood FRSE 1943 to 1960.

== Bibliography ==
- Bamberg, James H (2000). The History of the British Petroleum Company: British Petroleum and Global Oil, 1950–1975: The Challenge of Nationalism. Vol. III. Cambridge: Cambridge University Press. ISBN 9780521785150.
