= Old Parr =

Old Parr may refer to:

- Grand Old Parr
- Old Tom Parr
