= Glen Mhor distillery =

- Location: Inverness, Scotland
- Coordinates: 57°28′55″N 4°14′50″W
- Owner: Diageo
- Founded: 1892
- Status: Closed/demolished
- Water source: Loch Ness
- Demolished: 1986

Glen Mhor distillery was a Highland single malt Scotch whisky distillery in Inverness, Scotland.

== History ==
Glen Mhor distillery was built in 1892 by John Birnie and Charles Mackinlay, It was located between the Caledonian Canal and the railway.

In 1920, Mackinlay & Birnie bought Glen Albyn and in 1972 it was acquired by The Distillery Company Ltd.

Unlike many others distilleries, it remained water-powered until the 1950s. It had Saladin maltings installed in 1954.

The distillery was closed in 1983 because of falling whisky demand. It was demolished in 1986.
