= Pattisons (whisky company) =

Former producer of alcoholic drinks

Pattisons Limited was a Scotch whisky blender and bottler from 1896 until its bankruptcy in 1901. It is known for its role in the booming scotch whisky market of the late 19th century, and its instrumental role in the market's subsequent collapse.

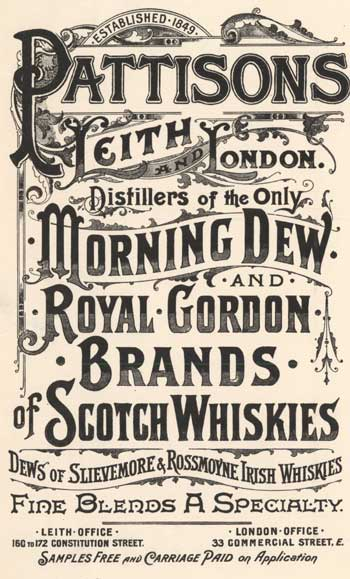
Pattisons Blends

== History ==
Pattisons Ltd. started out as a dairy wholesaler in Edinburgh. Seeing an opportunity for much greater profits, they entered the whisky business by forming a blending company in 1887, going public two years later. Around this time, the great phylloxera epidemic devastated the vineyards of France, significantly depleting the region's brandy reserves. This lull in production allowed whisky producers to bring about huge market growth. It was in this boom environment that Pattisons took shape.

Walter G.G. Pattison and Robert P. Pattison expanded from the blending business into distilling and incorporated in 1896 as Pattisons Ltd. The company grew very rapidly, purchasing a half share in the Glenfarclas distillery, shares in the Aultmore distillery and the Oban distillery and the Ardgowan grain whisky distillery. They also acquired the Duddingston Brewery in Craigmillar.

The brothers were known for their extravagant spending in both their personal and professional lives. They employed a sales force of 150 men, many more than their much larger competitor Distillers Company Ltd. Their advertising budget alone totalled over £60,000 in 1898 (£6.74 million in 2025). In addition to their huge print advertising campaigns, they gave away 500 grey parrots to vendors that were trained to repeat phrases like "Pattisons Whisky is best!" or "Buy Pattisons Whisky!"

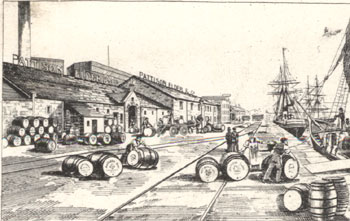
An engraving of Pattisons Whisky barrels on the docks at Leith

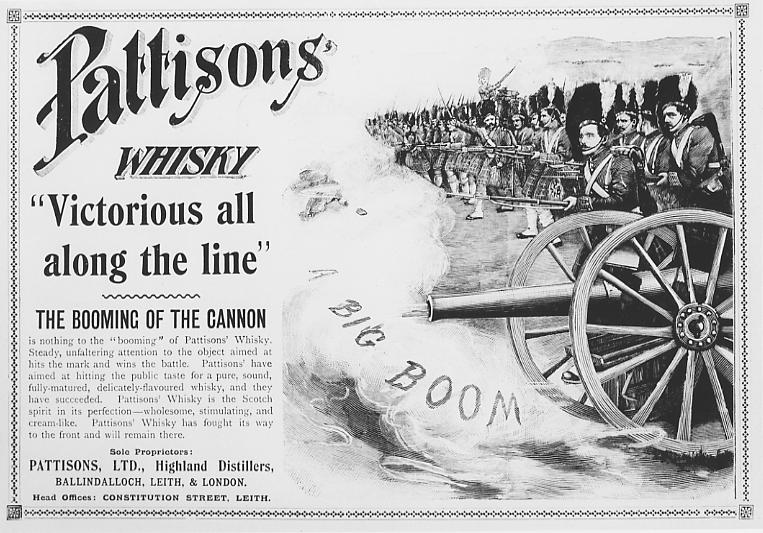
Pattison's advertising

== Bankruptcy and Conviction ==
In December 1898 the company began falling apart. DCL froze their account after an unpaid balance of £30,000. It was revealed that the company had massively inflated their profits through shoddy accounting practices and defaulted on several substantial debts. Among their many offences was mixing cheap whisky with a small quantity of fine Scotch and labeling it "Fine old Glenlivet" to bolster their bottom line by nearly £27,000. The brothers were tried for four counts of fraud and embezzlement in 1901. After just an hour and a half the Pattisons were found guilty. Robert Pattison was jailed for 18 months and Walter nine.
