= Tomatin distillery =

Whisky distillery in Scotland

Coordinates: 57°20′20″N 4°0′33″W

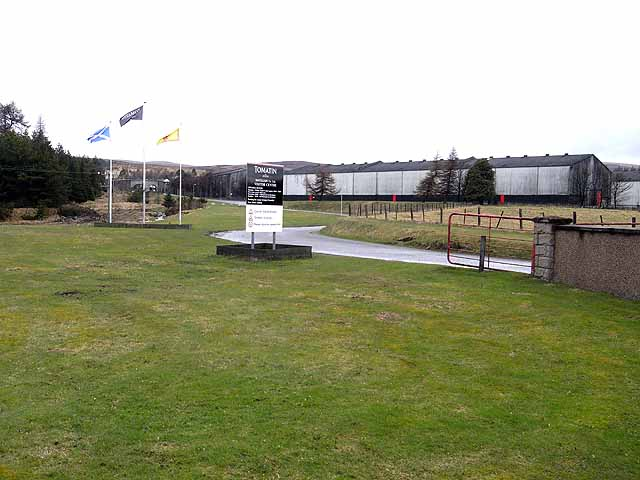
- Location: Inverness
- Owner: Takara Shuzo Corp.
- Founded: 1897
- Status: Operational
- Water source: Allt na Frìthe
- No. of stills: 6 wash stills 6 spirit stills
- Capacity: 5,050,000 litres per year

Tomatin
- Type: Single malt
- Age(s): 12 Year Old, 14 Year Old, 18 Year Old, 30 Year Old, 36 Year Old

Cù Bòcan
- Type: Single malt (lightly peated)
- Age(s): NAS

Antiquary
- Type: Blended
- Age(s): NAS, 12 Year Old, 21 Year Old

Talisman
- Type: Blended

Tomatin distillery is a single malt Scotch whisky distillery in the village of Tomatin. Its whisky is classified as being from the Highland region, as it is 25 minutes south of Inverness.

It is owned by the Takara Shuzo company. Around eighty percent of Tomatin's whisky goes into blended whisky, including its own brands of Antiquary and Talisman.

== History ==
Although it is thought that whisky has been distilled on the site since the 16th century, when cattle drivers would buy from a local still, the distillery was not established until 1897, under the name of Tomatin Spey Distillery Co Ltd.

The distillery operated with only two stills until 1958. Starting at that time, they began to add stills to increase production capacity, eventually reaching production of 12.5 million litres of whisky per year during the 1970s. Although in 1987 Tomatin was referred to as the largest malt distillery in Scotland, stills have been dismantled since the mid-1980s, bringing their total capacity to just over 5 million litres, though as of 2007, they were only producing 2.5 million litres.

The company went bankrupt in 1906, and reopened under new ownership in 1909. After the liquidation of its owners in 1986, it was taken over by Japanese conglomerate Takara Shuzo and was renamed Tomatin Distillery Co Ltd.

The distillery, as of late, has been making an effort to bolster its name as a producer of single malts and is expanding its core range. In 2003, Tomatin's basic 10-year-old malt was replaced by the 12-year-old. Other limited releases are often made, including a 32-year, a 40-year and single-cask offerings. Recently, the distillery has begun to produce a lightly peated single malt called Cù Bòcan which is produced 1 week a year at the distillery.
