= Glencadam distillery =

Scottish Malt Whisky distillery

Coordinates: 56°44′11.43″N 2°39′10.12″W

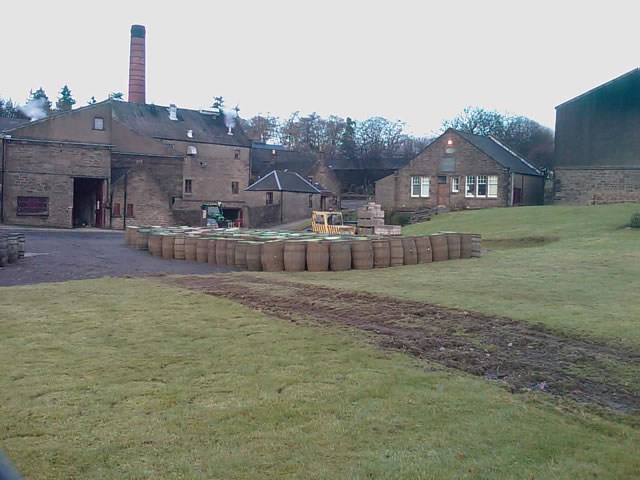
- Location: Brechin, Angus
- Owner: Angus Dundee plc
- Founded: 1825
- Status: Operational
- Water source: River South Esk
- No. of stills: 1 wash (14,000 L); 1 spirit (14,000 L)
- Capacity: 1,500,000 litres/per annum

Glencadam
- Type: Single malt
- Age(s): 10 year-old 13 year-old 15 year-old 17 year-old 18 year-old 19 year-old 21 year-old 25 year-old
- Cask type(s): Bourbon casks Port pipes Oloroso sherry casks
- ABV: 46%

Angus Dundee Scottish Royal James Parker Mackillops Choice
- Type: Blended whisky or Vatted malt
- Age(s): ~ 8 Years to 30 Years
- Cask type(s): Bourbon Casks

Glencadam distillery is a distillery in Brechin, Angus, Scotland that produces single malt Scotch whisky. The distillery is owned by Angus Dundee plc and produces one malt whisky, with the remainder of production sold to blenders or used within Angus Dundee plc for use in blended whisky brands.

== History ==
The Glencadam Distillery was founded in 1825, by merchant George Cooper, about 200 yards from Brechin Distillery. David Scott was the proprietor from 1827 to 1837. The distillery changed hands a number of times between 1837 and 1891. Gilmour, Thompson & Company Limited purchased the distillery in 1891 and used some of the Glencadam product in their Royal Blend brand of blended whiskey. The distillery, as with most others, reduced production during World War II owing to fuel and grain rationing.

Hiram Walker bought the distillery in 1954, they were bought by George Ballantine & Son Ltd two years later. In 1988 the ownership of the distillery passed to Allied Domecq during consolidation in the industry.

Allied Domecq mothballed the distillery in 2000 before selling the distillery to the present owners, Angus Dundee plc in 2003. Angus Dundee also owns the Tomintoul Distillery.

The present owners quickly resumed production and the product from the distillery is used in their own blended and vatted malt whisky products, which are also being sold to other blenders. In July 2010 Glencadam Malt Whisky was available in a range of official bottlings aged 10 to 21 years, as a component of Ballantine's and Stewart's Cream of the Barley blended whiskies, Angus Dundee's own blended and vatted whiskies, and in a number of other blended brands. Independent bottlings were also readily available, both as single malt and as vatted malts.

In November 2008, Angus Dundee plc re-launched the Glencadam line with new packaging and added a new 10 year-old single malt. Then, in July 2010 the company added three new expressions: a 21-year-old, a 12-year-old finished in port wood, and a 14-year-old finished in an oloroso sherry cask. More recently a 17-year-old finished in port wood was also released.

In 2023, the distillery relaunched its 18-year-old whisky, which it had withdrawn from the market in 2016.
