= Grand Old Parr =

Blended Scotch Whisky

- Type: Scotch Whisky
- Manufacturer: Diageo
- Country of origin: Scotland
- Introduced: 1909
- Alcohol by volume: 40%

Grand Old Parr (often simply just Old Parr) is a blended Scotch whisky produced by Diageo in Scotland. Is named after the Old Tom Parr, the reputed oldest man in England. Launched in 1909, it is found in export markets such as Japan, Mexico, South America (especially Colombia) and the United States, and is no longer distributed in the United Kingdom.

Old Parr is known for its distinctive dimpled and rounded bottle design. It retails at a premium price, and its competitor brands include Johnnie Walker Black Label and Chivas Regal. It also has an 18 year old Whisky bottle.

== History ==
Old Parr was introduced in 1909 by Greenlees Brothers of London and Glasgow. It takes its name from the reputed oldest man in Britain, Old Tom Parr. The name emphasised the maturity of the product. The brand was initially successful in London, before finding popularity in export markets.

Following a series of mergers, Greenlees became a part of MacDonald Greenlees & Williams. In 1925, the company was acquired by Distillers Company, which was acquired by Guinness, which merged in 1997 to form Diageo.

== Blends ==
=== Varieties ===
- Old Parr 12 Year Old (40% ABV)
- Old Parr 18 Year Old (40% ABV)
- Old Parr Silver (40% ABV)
- Old Parr Superior (43% ABV)

The original Old Parr Superior was launched in 1989, and was blended in small quantities in Scotland twice a year.

Discontinued blends Old Parr Tribute and Old Parr Elizabethan, the latter launched in the mid-1980s, retailed at a higher price than Superior.

Old Parr Silver was released in 2013, it is chill-filtered to minus 6 degrees Celsius.

In 2014 a new Old Parr Tribute was introduced for the Colombian market.

In 2022 Old Parr Old Aged 18 Years was released as a permanent addition to the Old Parr portfolio.

== Production ==
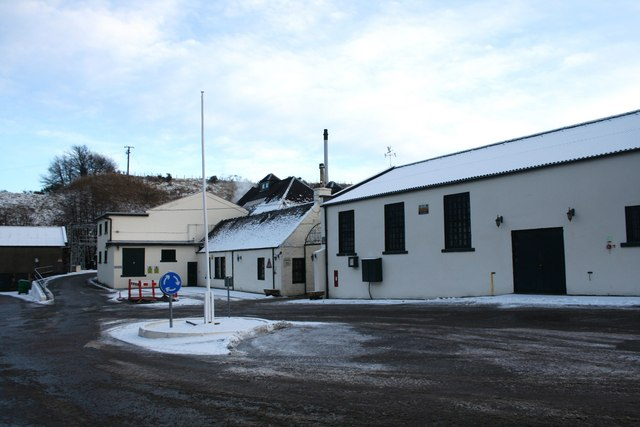
The Cragganmore Distillery in Scotland

Old Parr is sold in a distinctive dimpled and rounded square bottle, and is packaged in a gold cardboard box.

The basis of the blend is Cragganmore. Glendullan has been a major component of the blend since World War II.

The brand sold over 1 million cases (1 case equals 9 litres) in 2011, putting it among the top twenty highest selling Scotch whisky brands in the world.

Old Parr was bottled at Diageos plant in Kilmarnock before that closed in 2012. Old Parr is now bottled at the Diageo complex in Leven, Fife.

== Markets ==
The brand's highest sales are in the export markets of Japan and South America. In 2009-2010, the 12 year old held 52 percent of the Scotch market in Colombia.

The brand had ceased to be distributed in the United Kingdom by the 1980s.

== Advertising ==
The image of Thomas Parr painted by Rubens is featured on the label of Old Parr.

In the 1970s the brand was marketed with the slogan "Make friends with Old Parr".
