= Oban distillery =

Whisky distillery in Argyll and Bute, Scotland

Coordinates: 56°24′52.92″N 5°28′22.08″W

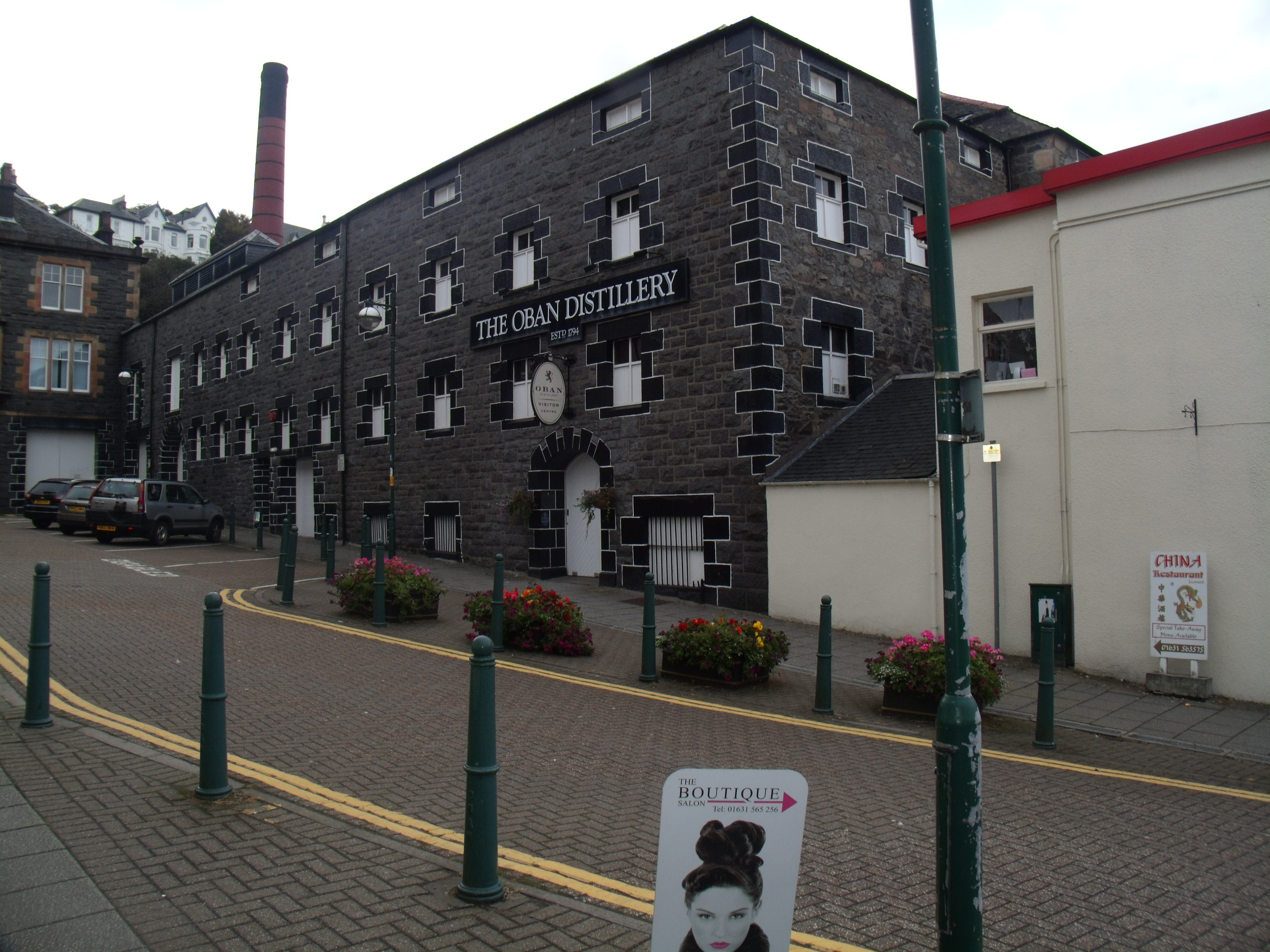
- Location: Oban
- Owner: Diageo
- Founded: 1794
- Founder: John and Hugh Stevenson
- Status: Operational
- Water source: Two lochs in Ardconnel
- No. of stills: 1 wash 1 spirit
- Capacity: 670,000 litres per year

Oban
- Age(s): 14, 18, 21, 32

Oban Distiller's Edition

Oban distillery (/ˈoʊbən/ OH-bən; Scottish Gaelic: Taigh-stail an Òbain) is a Highland single malt Scotch whisky distillery located in the Scottish west coast port of Oban. Established in 1794, it was built before the town of the same name, which sprang up later in the surrounding craggy harbour.

Oban distillery is owned by Diageo. It has only two pot stills, making it one of the smallest in Scotland, producing a whisky that has been described as having a "West Highland" flavour that falls between the dry, smoky style of the Scottish islands and the lighter, sweeter malts of the Highlands.

== History ==
The distillery was built in 1794 by the brothers John and Hugh Stevenson and operated by them until 1866, when it was bought by Peter Curnstie. It was then acquired by Walter Higgin in 1883 and rebuilt. In 1898, Alexander Edward, who also owned Aultmore Distillery, bought out Higgin. In its first year of operation, it suffered major losses when a major blending company, Pattisons of Leith, went under. In 1923, Oban was sold to Dewars and joined Distillers Company with that company in 1925. It fell silent from 1931 until 1937 and again from 1969 to 1972 when a new still house was built. In 1989, a new visitors' centre was installed.

== Bottlings ==
The Oban Distillery is primarily known for its 14-year-old malt, which is marketed as part of Diageo's "Classic Malts Selection" range, launched in 1988. Also available is a "Distiller's Edition" bottling, which is finished in a Montilla Fino sherry cask before bottling. There is also an 18-year-old limited edition and a rare 32-year-old edition which is limited to 6000 bottles. In December 2014 Oban introduced a NAS (non-age-statement) bottling, called Oban "Little Bay". In 2023, Diageo released an 11-year-old Oban called "The Soul of Calypso" as part of the Special Releases. It was matured in Caribbean rum casks.

== See also ==
- Classic Malts of Scotland
- List of distilleries in Scotland
- List of whisky brands
