= Millburn distillery =

Former whisky distillery in Inverness, Scotland

Coordinates: 57°28′56.7″N 4°12′20.8″W

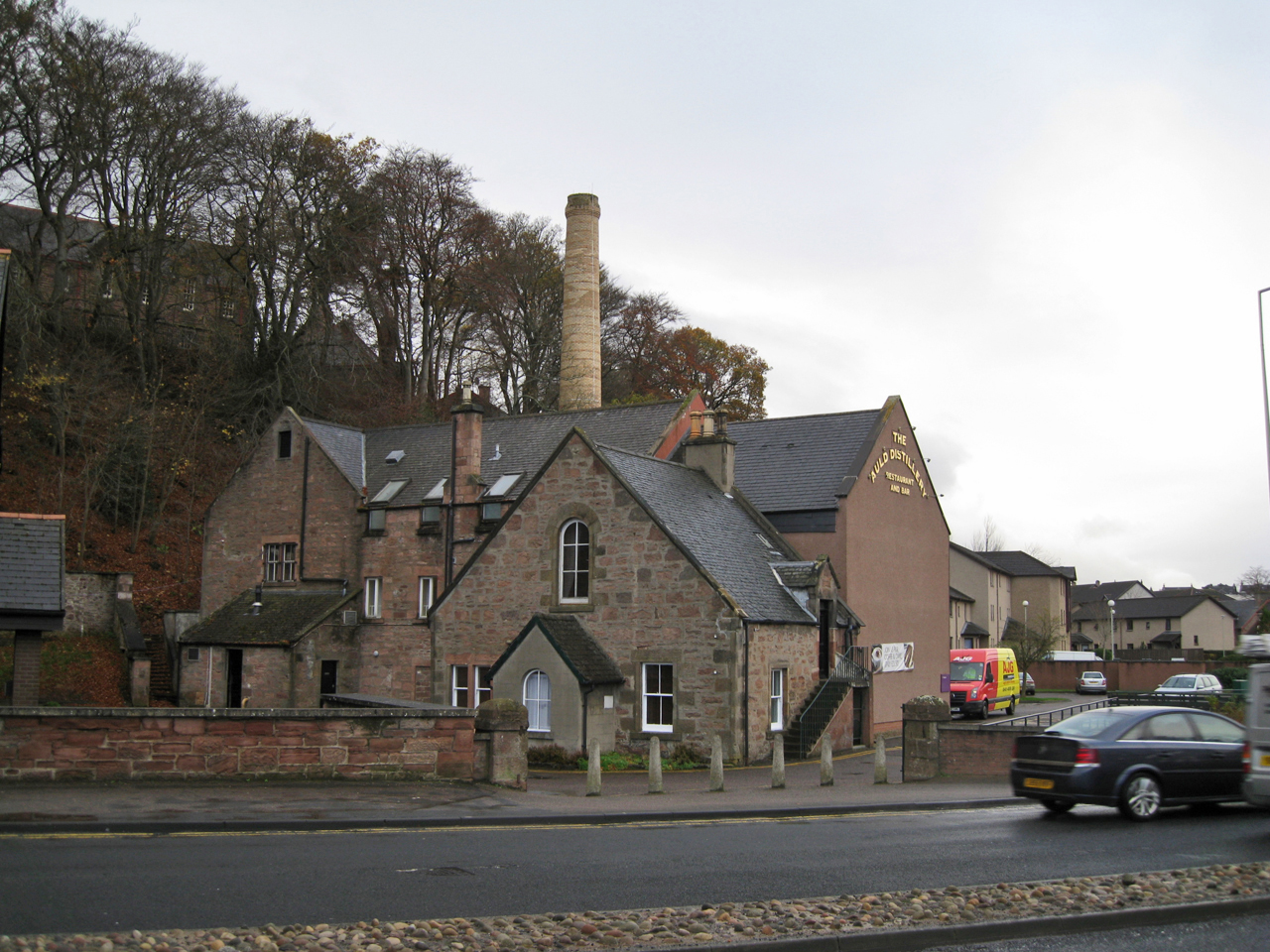
- Restaurant named "The Auld Distillery" in the site of the former distillery

Region: Highland
- Location: Inverness, Scotland
- Owner: DCL
- Founded: 1807
- Status: Closed/demolished
- Water source: Loch Duntelchaig
- No. of stills: 1 wash, 1 spirit
- Demolished: 1988

Millburn distillery was a Highland single malt Scotch whisky distillery in Inverness Scotland. It operated between 1807 and 1985. Its whisky was an important component of the "Mill Burn" vatted malt.

== History ==
The distillery was founded as "Inverness Distillery" by Mr. Welsh in 1807 (sixteen years before the passage of the Excise Act 1823, which legalized whisky distillation.) It came under the control of James Rose and Alexander MacDonald in 1825, but the company was sold off four years later.

In 1853, David Rose acquired the distillery and transferred control to his son, George Rose, in 1881. The younger Rose ran the distillery until 1892, when it was sold again to Andrew Haig & Co. In 1904, the distillery's name was officially changed to "Millburn" with the formation of the Millburn Distillery Company. In 1921, Millburn was acquired by Booth's Distillers Ltd. of London. The owners were able to rebuild and restore operation after a fire damaged the distillery in 1922.

Millburn became part of The Distillers Company (DCL) as a result of the 1935 merger of Booth's with William Sanderson & Co., which itself was purchased by DCL in 1937. DCL moved Millburn under the control of Scottish Malt Distillers Ltd in 1943.

Millburn was closed in 1985 by DCL and in 1988 many of the buildings were demolished, to allow for the property to be re-developed.

In 1989, Whitbread opened a Beefeater restaurant named "The Auld Distillery" in one of the remaining Millburn buildings, and shortly after a Travel Inn hotel was added. The site is no longer a Beefeater but is still owned by Premier Inn.
