= Royal Lochnagar distillery =

Whisky distillery in Scotland

Coordinates: 57°1′48″N 3°12′33″W

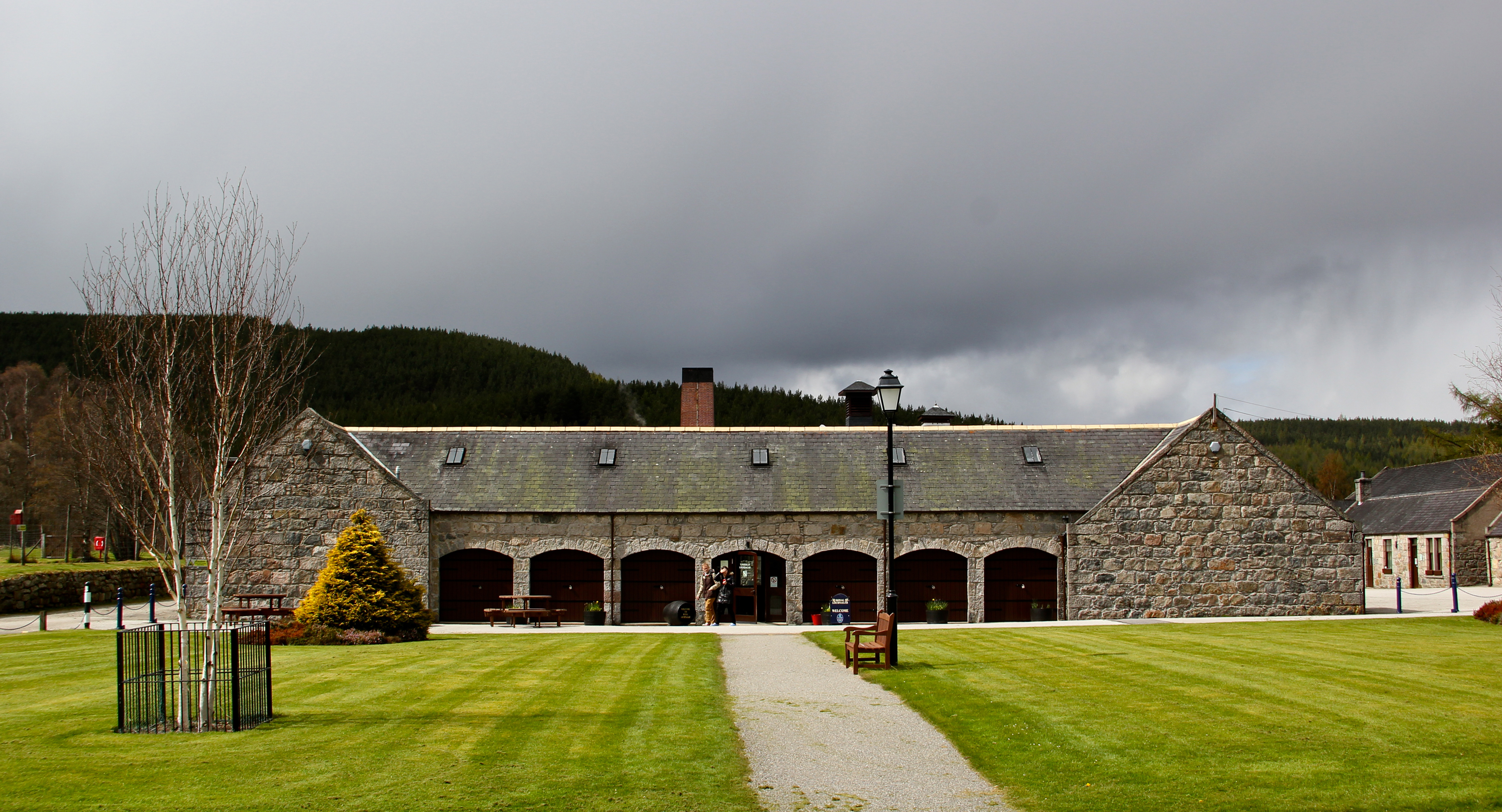
- The main building and visitor centre of the Royal Lochnagar Distillery in 2012

Region: Highland
- Location: Lochnagar, Royal Deeside
- Owner: Diageo
- Founded: January 1845
- Founder: John Begg
- Water source: Springs in the hills of Lochnagar
- No. of stills: 1 wash still (6,700 L); 1 spirit still (3,720 L)
- Capacity: 450,000 litres
- Website: Royal Lochnagar

Royal Lochnagar distillery is a single malt Scotch whisky distillery based on the Abergeldie Estate, near Balmoral Castle in Royal Deeside. It is close to the mountain Lochnagar. The distillery is in the Highland whisky-producing area of Scotland. The distillery holds a Royal Warrant.

== History ==
The first Lochnagar distillery was built by James Robertson of Crathie in the early 19th century. However, it burnt down in suspicious circumstances in 1824. A second and third replacement distillery was built and respectively burnt down again in 1826 and then 1841, supposedly by illicit competitors. In 1845, John Begg founded and built the "new" Lochnagar distillery which is the basis of the distillery in operation today.

The distillery has a long association with the royal family and was awarded its first Royal Warrant in 1848 when John Begg invited Prince Albert to visit the distillery from the nearby Balmoral Castle, the Monarch’s residence in the Highlands. The next day the distillery was visited by Queen Victoria, Prince Albert and their three eldest children. The distillery was then renamed as Royal Lochnagar three years following Queen Victoria's visit.

The distillery sold whisky under the name John Begg until the late 20th century, under the slogan 'Take a peg of John Begg'. The distillery remained in direct family ownership until 1902 when it became a private limited company. In 1916, the company was acquired by DCL. Until 1963, waterwheels and a steam engine powered the site.

In 2022 the distillery was awarded its fifth Royal Warrant. With the new honour, Royal Lochnagar is permitted to display the monarch symbol of the Royal Arms on its bottles at its distillery in Scotland, which neighbours King Charles’ Balmoral Estate.

Today Royal Lochnagar is leased by Diageo from the Abergeldie Estate and is the smallest whisky distillery in Diageo's holdings. The present site is largely incorporated in its original farm and steadings, composed of Aberdeenshire granite stone.

== Products ==
The distillery produces a relatively small amount of whisky, most of which is used in Johnnie Walker black and blue label. As well as in use for blends by Diageo, the distillery produces a standard 12 year old single malt for public sale that is bottled at 40% abv.

In June 2022, the distillery released a special edition whisky, known as the 'Balmoral platinum edition' for the Platinum Jubilee of Elizabeth II.

== Managers ==
- Mike Nicolson (1998-2003)
- David Hardy (2003-06)
- Donald Renwick (2006-2011)
- Andrew Millsopp (2011-?)
- Sean Phillips

== Bibliography ==
- Brander, Michael (1996). Brander's guide to Scotch whisky (5 ed.). New York: Globe Pequot. ISBN 978-1558214804. OCLC 34851266.
- Smith, Robin (2001). Lawson, Alan (ed.). The making of Scotland: a comprehensive guide to the growth of its cities, towns, and villages. Edinburgh: Canongate. p. 75. ISBN 978-1841951706. OCLC 48920986. "Royal Lochnagar."
- Wishart, David (2002). Whisky Classified. Choosing Single Malts by Flavour. Pavilion Books. ISBN 978-1911595731.
- Maclean, Charles (2016). Whiskypedia. A Gazetteer of Scotch Whisky. Edinburgh: Birlinn. ISBN 978-1-78027-401-0.
- Maclean, Charles (2017). Spirit of Place: Whisky Distilleries of Scotland. London: Frances Lincoln. ISBN 978-0711238916.
