= Vat 69 =

Trademarked blended Scotch whisky

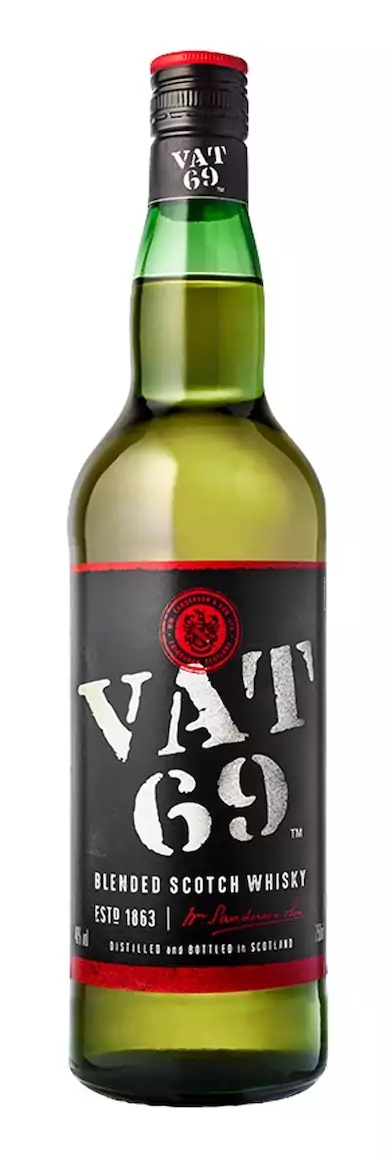
- A bottle of Vat 69 whisky
- Type: Blended Scotch whisky
- Manufacturer: Diageo
- Origin: Scotland
- Introduced: 1882
- Alcohol by volume: 40%

Vat 69 is a blended Scotch whisky produced by Diageo. It was created by William Sanderson & Son of Leith, Scotland, in 1882. At its peak, it was the 10th best-selling whisky in the world.

== History ==
William Sanderson (1839–1908) was apprenticed to a Leith-based wine and spirit merchant at the age of 13. By 1863 he had his own business, selling cordials, liqueurs, and blended whiskies. In 1882, he set out almost a hundred of his blends in numbered vats and invited expert colleagues to judge which one was best. The experts unanimously chose Vat 69, which then became Sanderson & Son's flagship product. Sanderson acquired the Glen Garioch distillery in Aberdeenshire in 1884 in order to give the company a constant supply of malt whisky, and in 1885 founded the North British distillery (producing grain whisky) with a number of other blenders.

In 1937, Sanderson & Son became part of The Distillers Company, later to become part of Diageo. Blending and bottling moved from Leith to South Queensferry in 1969. The South Queensferry plant closed in 1984.

== Blend ==
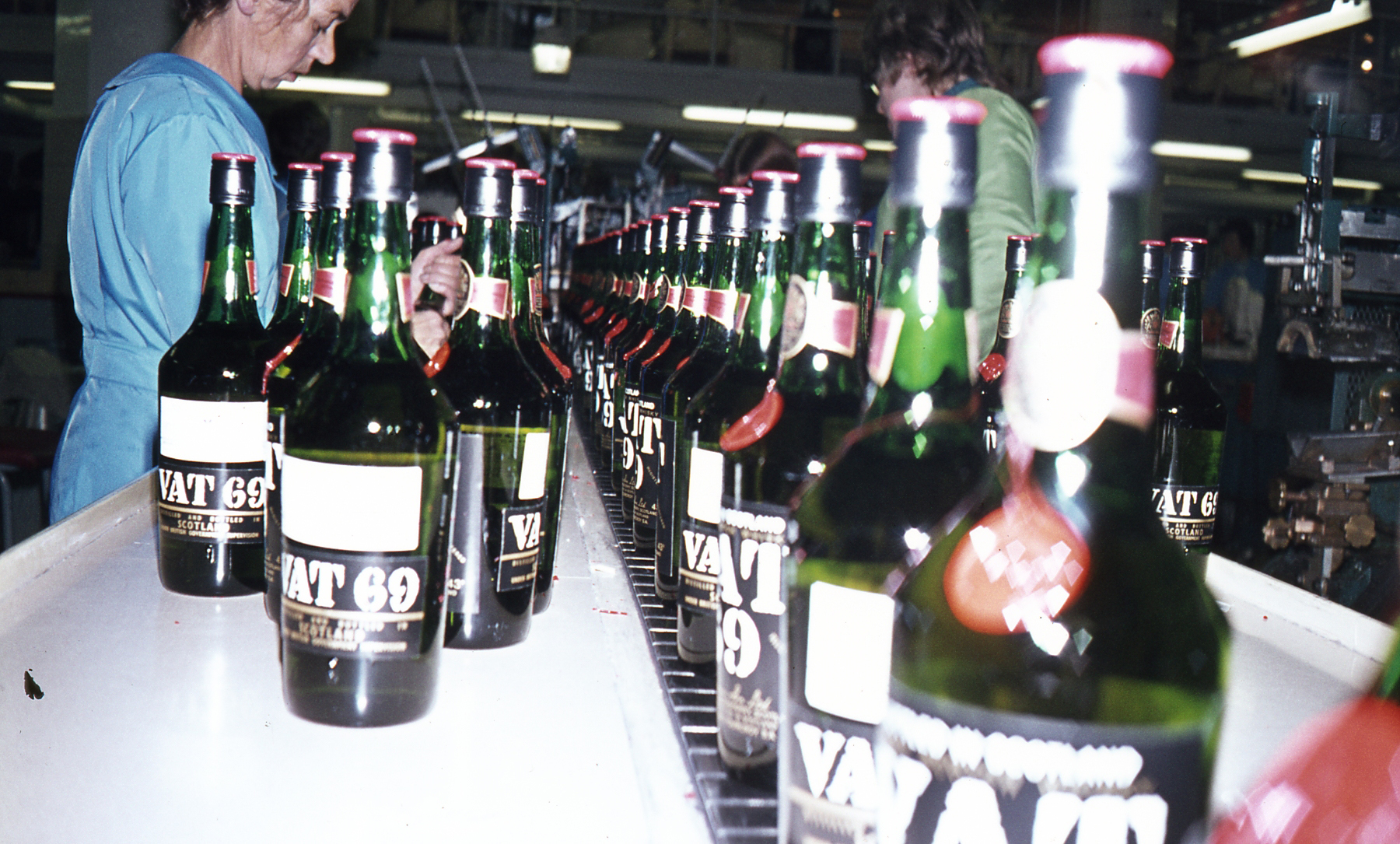
Vat 69 production in 1972

Despite its name, Vat 69 is not a vatted malt, but a blend of about 40 malt and grain whiskies. Vat 69 Reserve carries no standard age statement.

== In popular culture ==
In the 2001 HBO miniseries Band of Brothers, Vat 69 is the whisky of choice of Captain Lewis Nixon.

== See also ==
- List of whisky brands
