= Leonard Alsager Elgood =

- Born: 13 December 1892; Essex, United Kingdom
- Died: 31 January 1987 (aged 94)

Leonard Alsager Elgood FRSE OBE MC DL (13 December 1892 – 31 January 1987) was a British company director who served with distinction in the First World War.

== Life ==
He was born in Essex on 13 December 1892, the son of William Alsager Elgood JP, a banker in Dundee. The family lived at Elmbank on Station Road in Newport-on-Tay.

He was educated at the High School of Dundee. He then studied at St Andrews University but it is not clear if he graduated. His overall training was as a chartered accountant. In the First World War he served in the Black Watch and was promoted to Captain. He was three times Mentioned in Dispatches and also won the Military Cross. Records indicate that he joined up within the first days of the war, being commissioned as a Second Lieutenant on 4 September 1914. His Military Cross was won for wire-clearing work under heavy fire on the night of 9 May 1915 near Rouges Bancs.

In June 1919 he was awarded the Order of the British Empire (OBE).

He lived at 16 Cumlodden Avenue in the Ravelston Dykes area of Edinburgh. In 1948 he was created Deputy Lieutenant of the City and County of Edinburgh.

In 1962 he was elected a Fellow of the Royal Society of Edinburgh. His proposers were Foster Neville Woodward, Sir Edmund Peder Hudson, William A P Black and Philip Jackson.

He died on 31 January 1987.

== Positions held ==
Secretary of John Dewar & Sons 1936-39 Secretary of Distillers Company 1939-43 Director of the Distillers Company 1943- 1960 Director of the Royal Bank of Scotland 1946-66 Chairman of United Glass Ltd 1951-61 Chairman of the Committee on Natural Resources of Scotland 1958-62 Extraordinary Director of the Royal Bank of Scotland 1966-68

== Personal life ==
In 1917, whilst on leave, he married Jenny Coventry Wood, who died in 1984.
