= The Lost Close =

Historical underground venue in Edinburgh

Coordinates: 55°56′58″N 3°11′23″W

The Lost Close is a historical underground site and venue located at 1A Parliament Square, Edinburgh, Scotland. Hidden beneath the old Edinburgh police chambers and courtroom buildings, the space was rediscovered in the 21st century and opened to the public as a visitor attraction and venue. It showcases layers of the city's urban archaeology, including remains from the Great Fire of Edinburgh (1824), part of the original Edinburgh Police Station, and the vaults of Scotland's first bank. The venue offers immersive historical storytelling, guided whisky and gin tastings, walking tours and exhibits such as a rare 19th-century Crossley gas engine.

== History ==
The site is situated in Edinburgh's historic Old Town, in a building that has served multiple functions over centuries.

Much of the area around Parliament Square was devastated by the Great Fire of Edinburgh in 1824, which destroyed the buildings east of the square and led to redevelopment and expansion of civic facilities.

In 1846, new courtroom and jail cell facilities were opened, part of which included what is now The Lost Close. A subterranean passage and series of vaults remained hidden for decades and were rediscovered during refurbishment works in the 2010s.

== Rediscovery ==
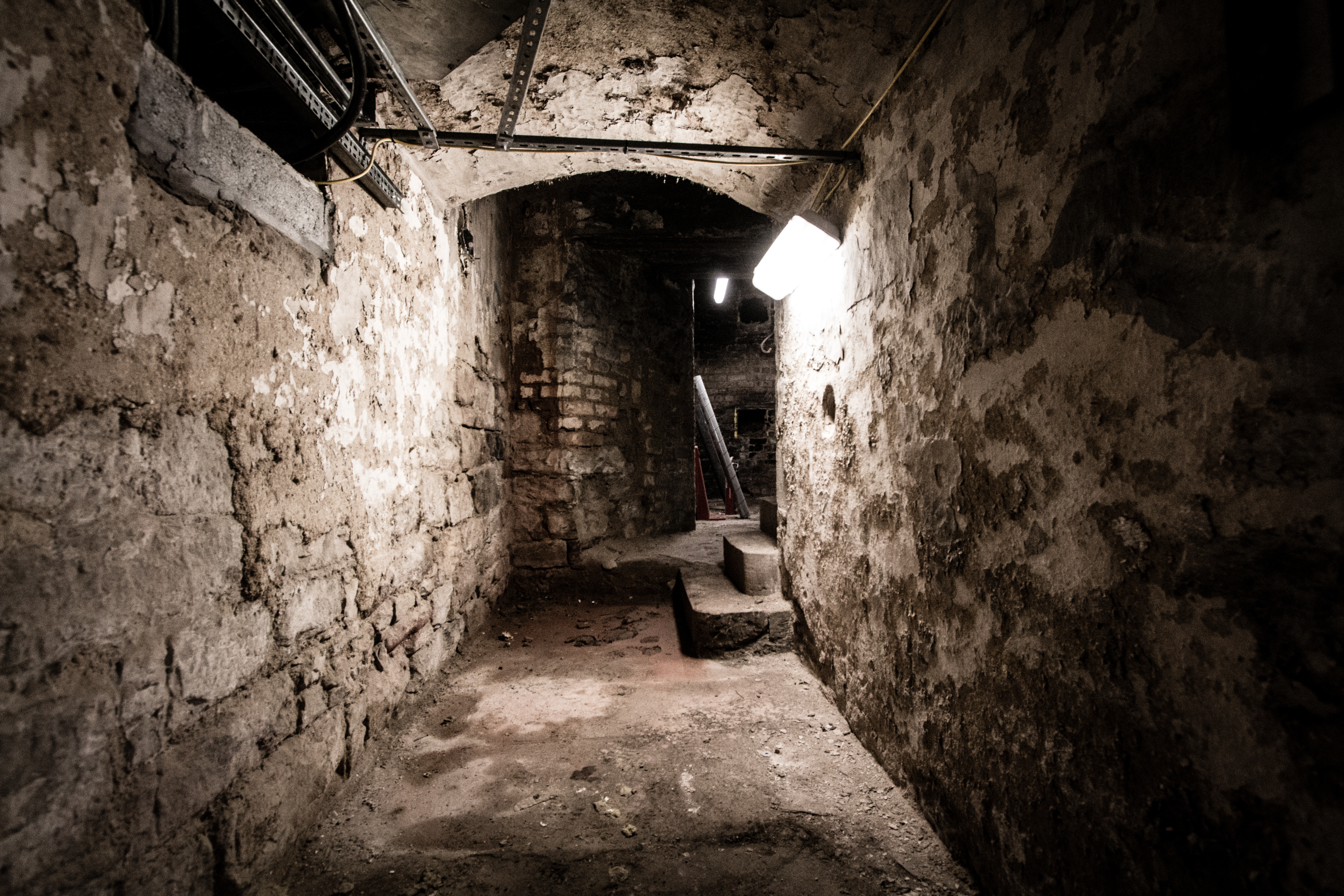
Underground vaults rediscovery underneath CoDE The Court hotel

The Lost Close was rediscovered in 2019 during the refurbishment of the former Edinburgh police chambers and courtroom buildings to create CoDE Pod Hostel. During the renovation, construction teams uncovered a series of bricked-up vaults and passageways beneath the building, including structures believed to be part of the city's early police infrastructure and possibly linked to the Bank of Scotland's original vaults.

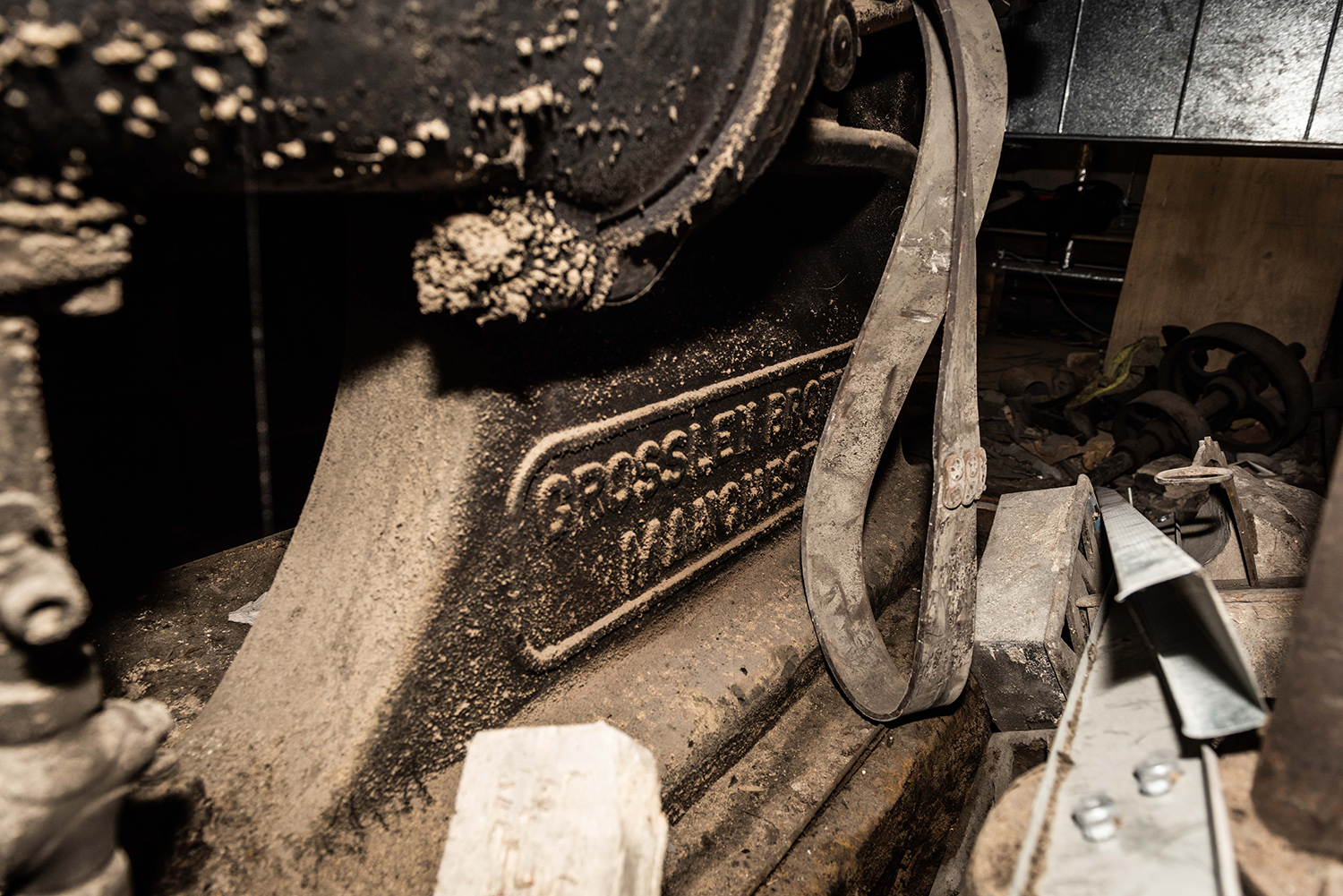
Crossley Engine discovery. Photo Copyright James Armandary

In 2025, a separate discovery was made in the attic of the building: a rare 19th-century Crossley gas engine, believed to be the second oldest of its kind in existence. Originally used for powering machinery in the Victorian era, the engine had been forgotten for decades. It was transported to The Lost Close and restored for public display as a centrepiece exhibit.

== Present day ==
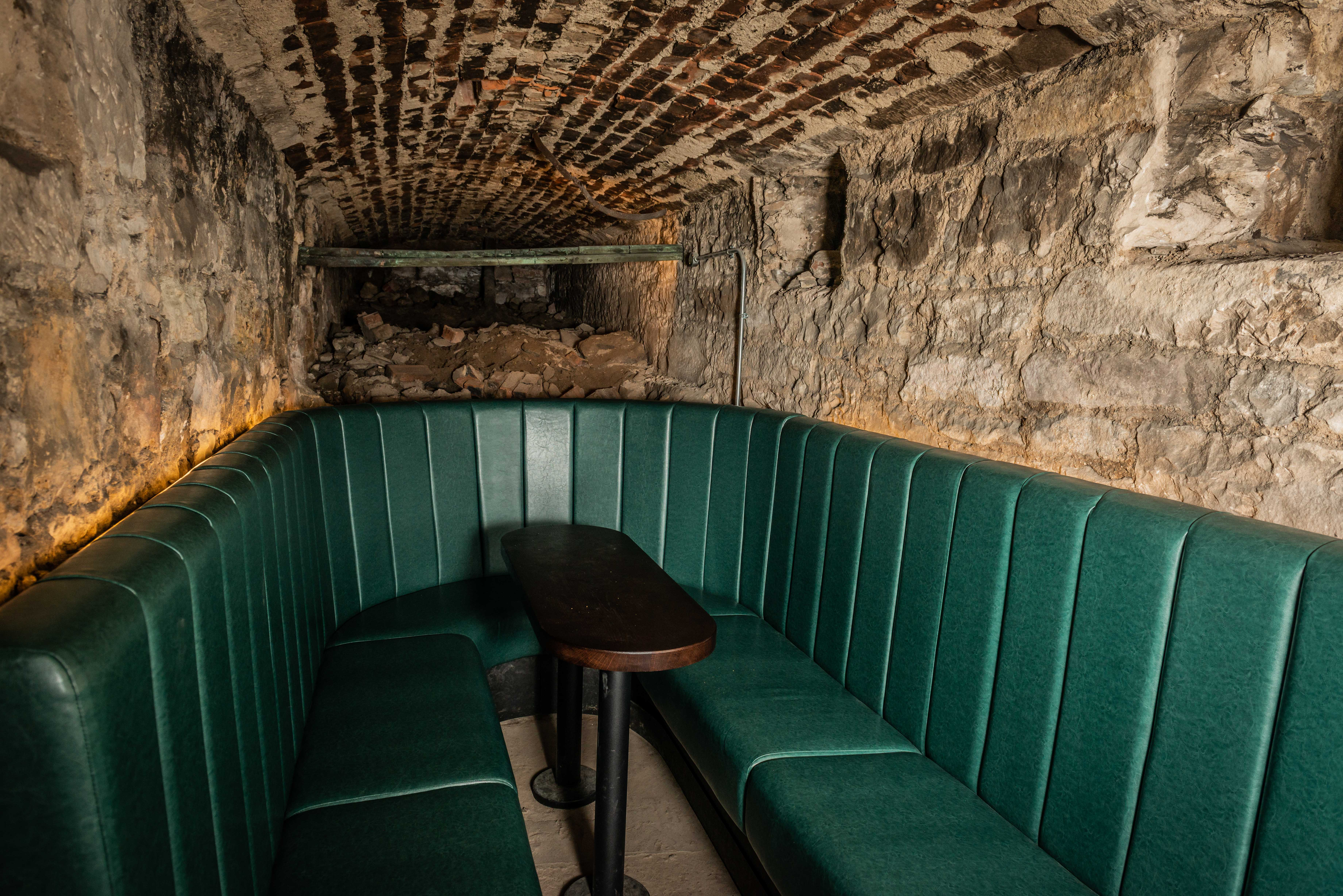
The Lost Close, Edinburgh. Photo Copyright James Armandary

The Lost Close opened to the public as an underground cultural and hospitality venue. Today, it offers:

- Guided whisky tastings featuring premium Scotch whiskies.
- Gin tastings and local beer tastings
- Historic walking tours

It is part of a wider regeneration of historic spaces by CoDE Concepts, a company that also operates The CoURT hybrid hotel above.
