= Dalmore distillery =

Whisky distillery in Alness, Scotland

Coordinates: 57°41′18.28″N 4°14′22.13″W

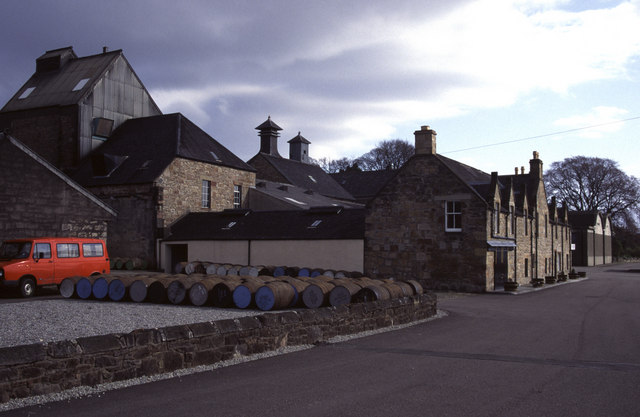

Region: Highland
- Location: Alness, Scotland
- Owner: Whyte & Mackay
- Founded: 1839
- Status: Operational
- Water source: Alness river
- No. of stills: 4 wash 16,500 + 8,250 litres (3,630 + 1,810 imperial gallons; 4,360 + 2,180 US gallons); 4 spirit 11,000 + 7,300 litres (2,400 + 1,600 imperial gallons; 2,900 + 1,900 US gallons)
- Capacity: 4,200,000 litres (920,000 imperial gallons; 1,100,000 US gallons)

The 12, The 15, The 18, 25
- Type: Single Malt
- Age(s): 12, 15, 18, 25
- ABV: 40–43

Dalmore King Alexander III
- Type: Single Malt
- ABV: 40

Dalmore distillery is located in Alness, Scotland, 20 miles (32 km) north of Inverness. It sits on the banks of the Cromarty Firth overlooking the Black Isle, the "big meadowland" from which it takes its name.

The Dalmore distillery is operated by Whyte & Mackay, which Philippines-based Alliance Global owns.

== History ==
The distillery was established in 1839 by entrepreneur Alexander Matheson and sold to Andrew and Charles Mackenzie in 1867, who introduced the 12-pointed Royal Stag emblem.

Operations ran fairly smoothly at the distillery until 1917 when the British Royal Navy began to use the firth next to the distillery as a site for the production of deep-sea mines. In 1920 much of the distillery was destroyed by an explosion and the fire resulting from a mine detonation incident. The subsequent legal battle between Andrew Mackenzie and the Royal Navy lasted over half a decade, even reaching the House of Lords.

The distillery remained family-owned until 1960, when one of Dalmore's main customers, Whyte & Mackay, took control.

== Production ==
The water used in the Dalmore is taken from the river Averon, which runs through the small town of Alness, where the distillery is located. The waters of the river flow from the nearby Loch Morie, located deep in the heart of the Northern Highlands. The location of the Dalmore's distillery and its smooth, floral flavor qualify it as a Highland malt.

The wash stills at Dalmore have flat tops and are also in two sizes. Three are 13,000 litres (2,900 imp gal; 3,400 US gal) in capacity, and the fourth is double that. The spirit stills all sport water coolers around their necks to assist in reflux. Again, one of the quartets is double the size. Because of this discrepancy in size and the fact that the spirit stills are charged when the low wines and feints receiver is full, the strength of the charge to those stills varies, creating different end flavors. All these distillates are vetted before being casked.

Condensing is also unusual. The spirit stills have external shell and tube condensers which lie horizontally. This mirrors the old worm pipe which lay in the burn which runs outside the stillhouse.

The Dalmore uses several types of wooden casks for whisky maturation and finishing, including American white oak ex-bourbon barrels, sherry casks and wine casks. One example is the Cigar Malt Signature Reserve Aged 18 Years, introduced in 2026 as a permanent addition to the distillery's range. The whisky is initially matured for 16 years in American white oak ex-bourbon barrels before finishing in Matusalem Oloroso sherry, Marsala, Cabernet Franc and Cabernet Sauvignon casks.

A significant contributor to W&M's blends, for many years Dalmore's presence in the world of single malt was restricted to a 12-year-old expression. In recent times, however, the range has expanded dramatically, with a core range of 12, 15, 18 and 25-years-old, as well as no-age-statement specialty and luxury offerings. Prices at the top end often cost more than five figures.

== Record price ==
- On 15 April 2005, a bottle of 62-year-old Dalmore was sold by Denis Barthe, Bar Manager of the Ascot Bar at Pennyhill Park Hotel in Bagshot Surrey, for £32,000. The blend was a mix of five casks, from 1868, 1878, 1922, 1926 and 1939. Only 12 bottles were produced.
- In 2010 the distillery completed production of Dalmore Trinitas, so called because only three bottles were produced. The first two bottles sold for £100,000 each. According to the distillery website, the final bottle was sold in Harrods in London for £120,000 in 2011.
- In 2013, The Dalmore created the Paterson Collection, in homage to its Master Distiller Richard Paterson. The 12-bottle collection went on sale in Harrods for £987,500.
