= Aquavit =

Aquavit may refer to:

- Aqua vitae, Latin for "water of life", a concentrated alcoholic distillate
- Akvavit, a Scandinavian distilled beverage
- Okovita, a historic Polish-Ukrainian term for an alcoholic drink related to vodka
- Restaurant Aquavit, a Scandinavian restaurant in New York
