= Glen Garioch distillery =

Whisky distillery in Scotland

Coordinates: 57°20′18.67″N 2°19′9.69″W

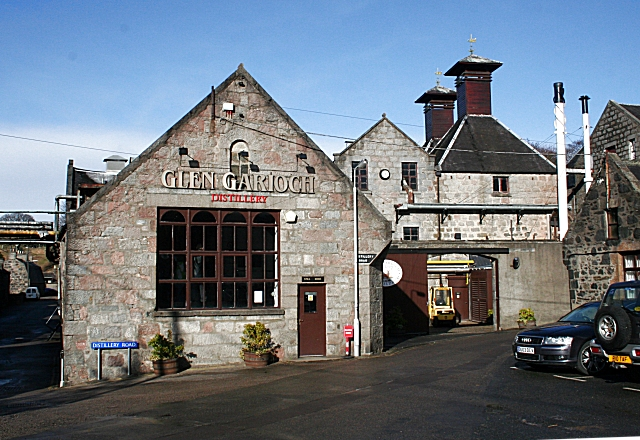

Region: Highland
- Location: Oldmeldrum, Aberdeenshire, Scotland.
- Owner: Suntory Global Spirits
- Founded: 1797
- Status: Operational
- Water source: The Silent Spring of Coutens Farm
- No. of stills: 2 wash (20,000 + 10,000 L); 2 spirit (11,000 L)
- Capacity: 1,000,000 L

Glen Garioch Highland Single Malt

Glen Garioch distillery (/ɡlɛnˈɡiːri/) is a Highland single malt Scotch whisky distillery in Oldmeldrum, Aberdeenshire, Scotland. It is one of the oldest whisky distilleries in Scotland, dating back to 1797. It is operated by Morrison Bowmore Distillers, which is owned by Suntory Global Spirits, a subsidiary of Suntory Holdings of Osaka, Japan.

== History ==
The location chosen by John and Alexander Manson for their malt whisky distillery in 1797 was an obvious one. Oldmeldrum in the celebrated valley of the Garioch was named "the Granary of Aberdeenshire", famous for producing the finest barley in all of Scotland.

The distillery, which originally incorporated a brewery and tannery, stands on the very edge of the town of Oldmeldrum in Aberdeenshire.

In 1968 the production of Glen Garioch was suspended on account of "chronic water shortages". However, in 1972 a manager was appointed with a brief to find another water source. A spring was discovered on a neighbouring farm. It came to be called "The Silent Spring" as it could neither be seen nor heard.

In 1983, Glen Garioch distillery was closed for a brief period.

In 1990, after years of reduced production, the distillery was purchased by The Morrison Bowmore Distillery Ltd., which was part of the Japanese Suntory group. The new owners restored the distillery and began producing whisky again under the Glen Garioch name.

In 1995, Glen Garioch was mothballed but reopened in 1997.

== Whisky ==
Glen Garioch’s range includes the 1797 Founder's Reserve, alongside periodic releases of individually selected batches. The first of these, launched as “Single Batch Releases”, were the Glen Garioch 1990 Vintage and the Glen Garioch 1978 Vintage.

Current Glen Garioch range:

=== Hearty Highland Malts ===
- Glen Garioch 12 Years Old
- Glen Garioch Founder's Reserve
- Glen Garioch Virgin Oak

=== Vintage releases ===
- Glen Garioch Vintage 1978
- Glen Garioch Vintage 1986
- Glen Garioch Vintage 1990
- Glen Garioch Vintage 1991
- Glen Garioch Vintage 1994
- Glen Garioch Vintage 1995
- Glen Garioch Vintage 1997
- Glen Garioch Vintage 1999

=== Renaissance ===
- Glen Garioch 15 Years Old Renaissance

== See also ==
- List of whisky distilleries in Scotland
- List of historic whisky distilleries
