= Highland single malts =

Whiskies produced in the Highlands of Scotland

Whisky producing regions of Scotland

Highland single malts are single malt Scotch whiskies produced in the Highland region of Scotland. This categorisation includes whiskies produced on the islands around the perimeter of Scotland (the Island single malts), except for Islay (see Islay whisky). Incongruously, the area includes lowland areas in the North-East, such as Moray and Aberdeenshire.

== Legal status ==
Highland is a "protected locality" for Scotch Whisky distilling under UK Government legislation.

== List of Highland single malt distilleries ==
- AnCnoc
- Aberfeldy
- Ardmore
- Ardnamurchan
- Balblair
- Ben Nevis
- Blair Athol
- Clynelish
- Dalmore
- Dalwhinnie
- Deanston
- Drumguish
- Edradour
- Glencadam
- Glen Deveron
- Glen Eden
- Glendronach
- Glenfoyle
- Glen Garioch
- Glengoyne
- Glenmorangie
- Singleton of Glen Ord
- Glenturret
- Knockdhu
- Loch Lomond
- Loch Morar
- Macphail
- McClelland
- Millburn
- Oban
- Old Fettercairn
- Old Pulteney
- Royal Brackla
- Royal Lochnagar
- Teaninich
- Tullibardine
- Tomatin
- Wolfburn
