= Diageo Global Supply Centre =

Spirits manufacturing centre in Fife, Scotland

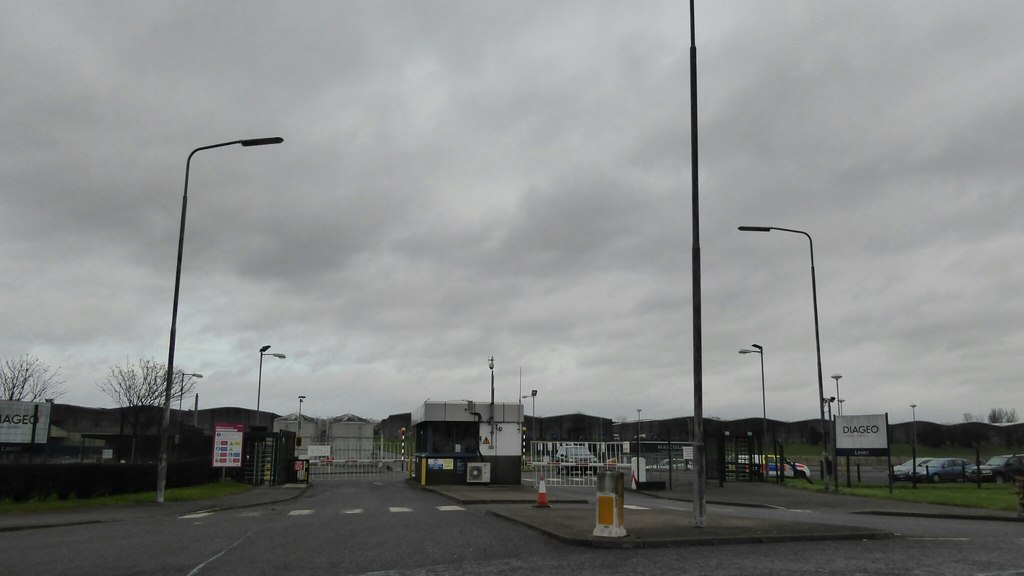
- Entrance in December 2016

- Location within Fife
- Former names: Banbeath Bottling Plant

General information
- Type: Spirits manufacturing centre
- Architectural style: Factory
- Location: Fife, KY8 5HD
- Coordinates: 56.2°N 3.032°W
- Elevation: 35 m (115 ft)
- Construction started: 1971
- Completed: 1973
- Inaugurated: 1973
- Client: The Distillers Company
- Owner: Diageo

The Diageo Global Supply Centre is the main spirits manufacturing and bottling facility in Leven, Scotland, owned by Diageo. As well as much whisky, it bottles Smirnoff vodka.

== History ==
Work began on building the site in April 1971.

The site was to cost £7-8m, with 900 jobs, over 162 acres. Outline planning permission was given in November 1970, followed by approval of the DCL site in February 1971 by the Secretary of State for Scotland.

Planning approval for the bottling plant was given at Cupar in August 1971. By October 1971, the cost of the site had increased to £10m, for the 24 maturation racked warehouses. Each 100,000 sq-yd (five acres) warehouse would cost £300,000. Blending began in May 1973, with bottling starting in September that year.

A plant at Markinch closed in 1983, with bottling being moved to Banbeath, with the loss of 340 workers while 220 were transferred to Leven.

In 1985 site had 1100 workers. In the early 1990s the site was known as United Distillers Bottling and Blending. In 1996 it was known as the Banbeath Bottling Plant.

The site had a large expansion in 2001 for the ready to drink production for alcopops such as Smirnoff Ice.

An £86m expansion was opened in 2012. This added a luxury products hall and a new bottling hall with six whisky lines bottling Johnnie Walker, Old Parr, Dimple, Cardhu and The Singleton. The expansion of the Leven bottling site was announced in 2009 amid controversy, as Diageo closed down its Kilmarnock bottling plant with long-standing links to the Johnnie Walker brand. That move cost 700 jobs in Ayrshire. More than 40 people took up the offer to move to Fife for work with the company.

The site has a small distillery. The site is Diageo's largest bottling facility, producing 30 million cases a year.

In 2023 Diageo partnered with E.ON and Emtec Energy to build Scotland's largest private wire ground-mounted solar farm with 8,000 panels on an area the size of eight football pitches adjacent to the Global Supply Centre and will generate up to 22% of the site’s annual electrical demand, and up to 60% in the summer months.

== Distillery ==
Leven distillery
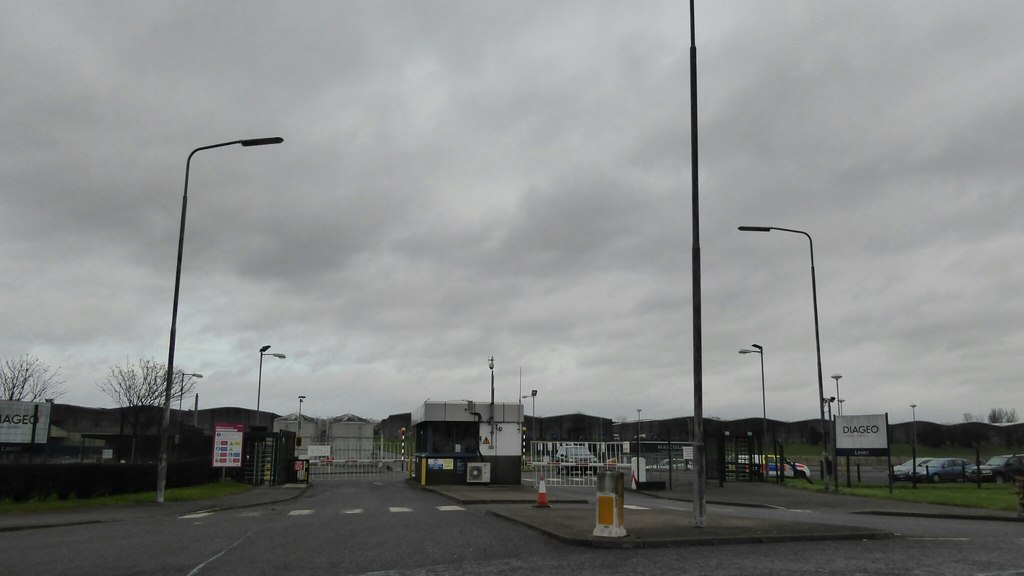

Region: Lowland
- Location: Leven, Fife, Scotland
- Owner: Diageo
- Founded: 2013
- Status: Active
- Water source: Town supply
- No. of stills: 1 wash still (1,000 L); 1 spirit still (1,000 L)
- Capacity: 250,000 L (55,000 imp gal; 66,000 US gal)

Leven distillery is an experimental Scotch single malt whisky distillery in Leven, Scotland. It is owned by Diageo and is not open to the public.

Its purpose is to future-proof Diageo’s Scotch whisky business, by finding new flavours and tweaking processes to improve efficiencies. Leven’s distilling team work closely with Diageo’s blenders to experiment with flavours throughout the process, from milling at different settings, playing with different barley varieties, yeasts and heavily roasted malts, and moving cut points. By running its experiments here, Diageo avoids the break in normal production output it would otherwise experience at one of its other distilleries, although some trials are scaled up at select sites.

As well as being the only distillery in Scotland to reside within a bottling facility, it is also one of the only licensed distilleries in Scotland without a spirit safe, having received special dispensation for being an experimental site.

In 2005, Diageo created the Leven’s Process Liquid Development Area (PLDA). This was a new blending and filtration facility to focus on new product development.

In 2013, a fully functional distillery was established at Leven to allow for dedicated experimental distillation projects, becoming Diageo’s 29th working distillery.

While its focus today is to experiment with processes and flavour innovation in Scotch whisky, Leven also distils sake for Diageo’s Jinzu line, the only product to be regularly produced at the distillery.

== See also ==
- List of whisky distilleries in Scotland
- Scotch Whisky Research Institute
- Liqueur bottling plant of Diageo, costing £41m, at Mallusk, County Antrim, built around 2004, bottles Baileys Irish Cream
- Guinness bottling plant at Preston Brook in Cheshire
