= Cameronbridge distillery =

Scotch whisky distillery in Fife, Scotland

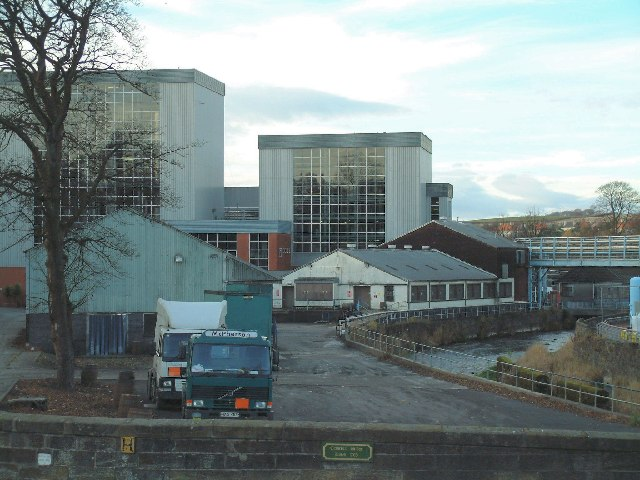
- Location: Fife
- Owner: Diageo
- Founded: 1824
- Water source: River Leven
- No. of stills: 3 column stills
- Capacity: 136 million litres

Cameronbridge distillery (Scottish Gaelic: Drochaid Chamshròn) Is a grain whisky distillery located in Cameron Bridge, Scotland.

== History ==
The distillery was founded in 1824 and in 1830 became one of the first distilleries to produce grain whisky using the column still method invented by Robert Stein. In 1877 John Haig & Co merged with five other whisky companies to form the Distillers Company, with John Haig & Co coming under DCL's full ownership in 1919. Cameron Bridge produced both grain and malt whisky using a combination of pot stills and column stills until 1929, when it shifted exclusively to grain whisky production.

For a period between 1941 and 1947, the distillery closed due to World War II. The current Column still house was constructed during the 1960s, and two of its three stills are more than 30 years old. The third was transferred from Carsebridge distillery in Alloa when it was closed by United Distillers in 1983. Major renovations at Cameron Bridge occurred in 1989–92 as well as up to 2000 when the distillery produced up to 30 million imperial gallons (140,000,000 L) of spirit annually.

In 1998 Cameronbridge also changed from being solely a large-scale grain whisky distillery into a 'dual-purpose' site, when United Distillers' grain neutral spirit (GNS) operation was transferred to Fife from Wandsworth in London. GNS for white spirits and 'sweetened products' such as Archers, Pimm's, Smirnoff, Tanqueray and Gordon's Gin were also produced alongside grain spirit used in the Johnnie Walker, J&B, Bell's, Black & White, Vat 69, Haig and White Horse blended whisky brands owned by Diageo but the GNS column was later converted to a whisky still but remains capable of producing GNS.

It is currently the largest of the remaining grain distilleries in Scotland and is owned by Diageo.
