= Benrinnes distillery =

Whisky distillery in Speyside, Scotland

Coordinates: 57.44188°N 3.23686°W

Benrinnes
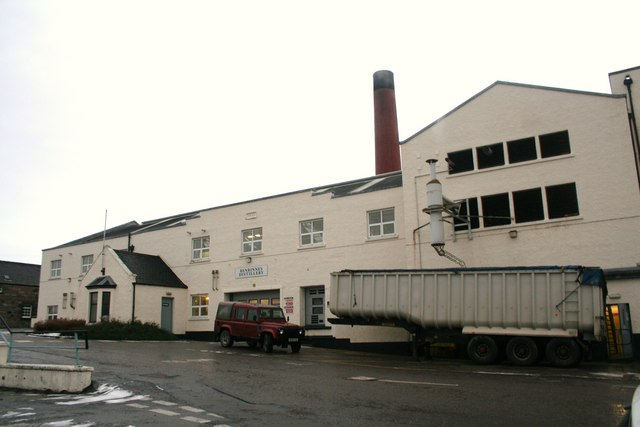
- The Benrinnes distillery

Region: Speyside
- Location: Aberlour
- Owner: Diageo
- Founded: 1826
- Founder: John Innes
- Status: Open
- Water source: Scurran Burn and Rowantree Burn
- No. of stills: 2 wash stills 4 spirit stills
- Capacity: 2,500,000 L

Benrinnes
- Type: Speyside
- Age(s): 15 years old

Benrinnes distillery (/bɛnˈrɪnɛs/) is a malt whisky distillery in Aberlour producing an eponymous whisky. It was founded in 1826, and is still active. The distillery employed a unique partial triple distillation process until 2007.

== History ==
The first time whisky was produced at the site of Benrinnes distillery was in 1826, when a distillery was founded by Peter McKenzie. This distillery was destroyed by a flood in 1829, and was rebuilt in 1835 in the outbuildings of a farmhouse by John Innes, and officially founded under the name Lyne of Ruthrie

The distillery went bankrupt, and Lyne of Ruthrie was sold to William Smith. Smith changed the name of the distillery to the present name Benrinnes before selling the property to David Edward who ran the distillery until his son Alexander Edward took over operation of the distillery. In 1887 Alfred Barnard described the distillery in his work The Whisky Distilleries of the United Kingdom. At this time the distillery had two stills, a wash still with a capacity of 4910 liters (1080 gallons), and a spirit still of 4564 liters (1004 gallons). In 1896 the distillery was damaged in a fire. It was rebuilt and modernised; the distillery converted to be powered by electricity.

The distillery was sold to John Dewar & Sons in 1922. Dewars join Distillers Company (DLC) in 1925. The distillery was expanded in 1966, adding three stills to the three present stills, which were all converted to internal heating in 1970. In 1974 Benrinnes changed its distillation process to a partial triple distillation process. The distillery stopped producing its own malt in 1984 opting to buy malt on the market instead, and removed its saladin box.

DLC was renamed as United Distillers in 1987. In 1998 United Distillers was merged with International Distillers & Vintners to create United Distillers & Vintners, forming the spirits division of Diageo plc.

The triple distillation process was abandoned in 2007, when it switched to a more common configuration of two wash stills and four spirit stills.

== Production ==
Benrinnes employed some unusual production techniques. Between 1974 and 2007 the distillery used a unique partial triple distillation process. In this process the feints from the wash still, the weaker parts of feints of the spirit still, and the feints from the low wine still itself are distilled in a low wines still, while the spirit still is fed by the foreshots and the heart of the wash and low wine still, and its own foreshots and strong feints. The necks of the stills are cooled by worm tubs, a technique that is no longer very common.

Benrinnes produces one fifteen-year-old semi-official bottling in the Flora and Fauna range since 1991.
