= Haig (whisky) =

Scottish brand of whisky

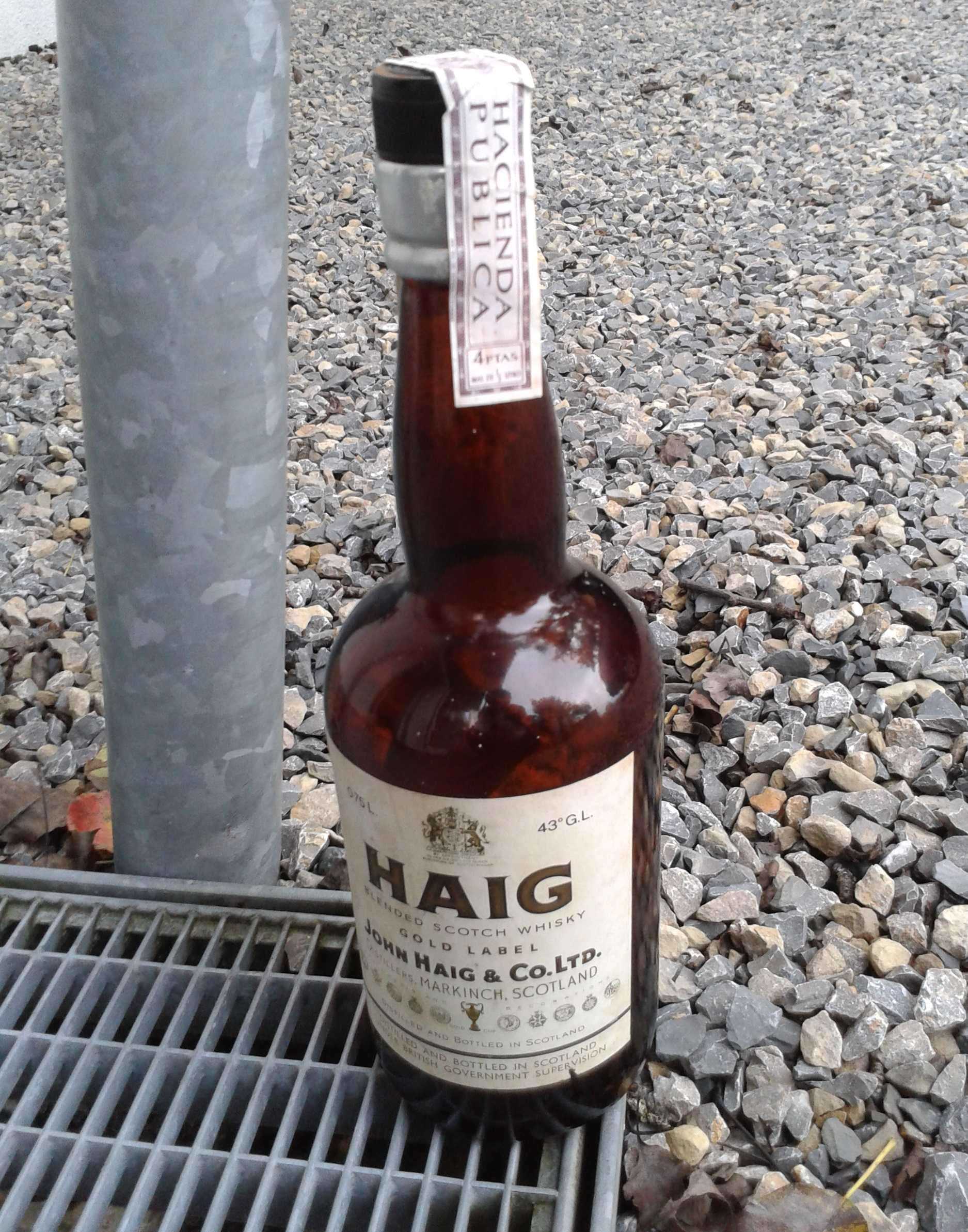
- Type: Scotch whisky
- Manufacturer: Diageo
- Origin: Scotland
- Introduced: 1720s
- Alcohol by volume: 40%
- Website: Haig

Haig (/heɪɡ/) is a brand of Scotch whisky, produced by Diageo in Scotland. It was originally manufactured by John Haig & Co Ltd. since the early 1820s.

== History ==
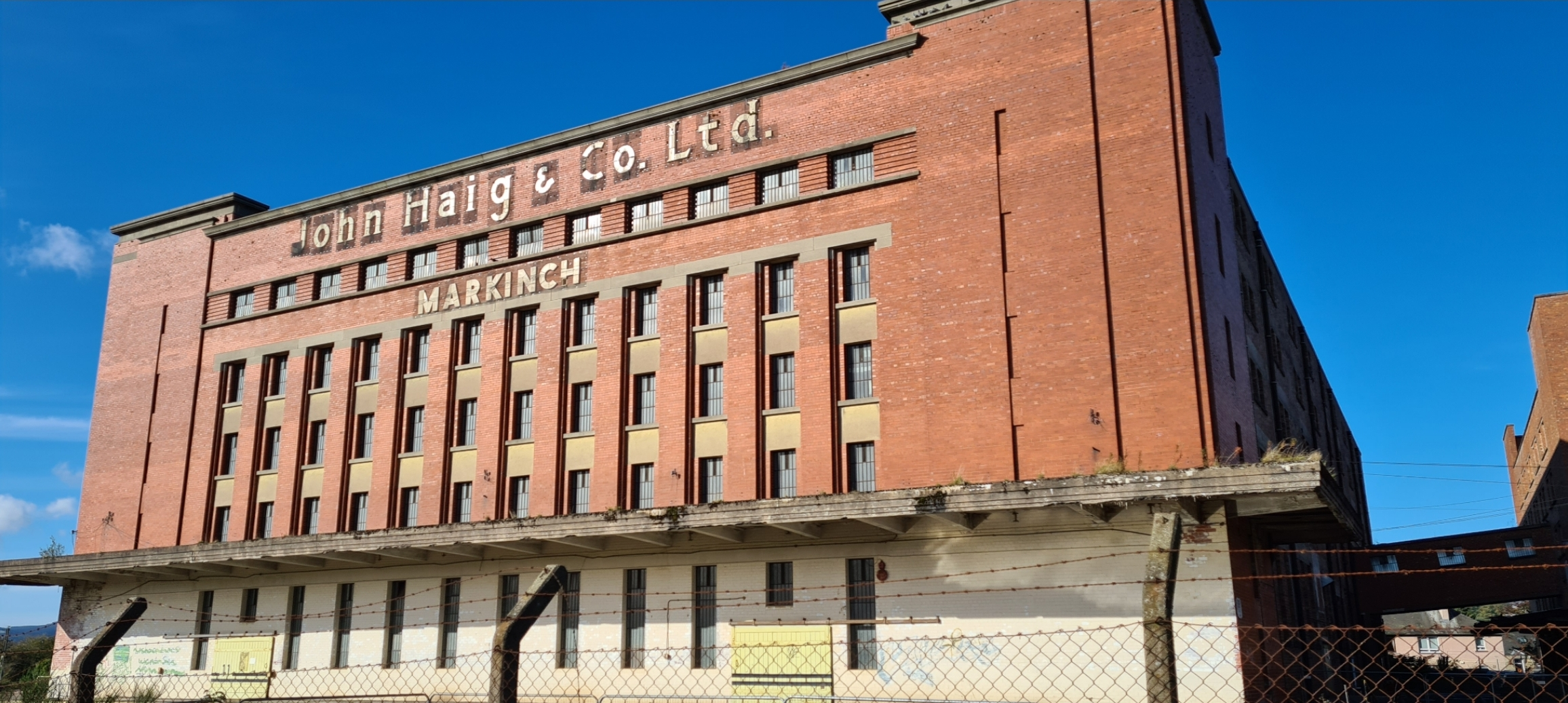
Former headquarters in Markinch

Andrew Stein was a local farmer in Clackmannan, who founded a distillery in the early 1720s in the Kennetpans in Clackmannan, Clackmannanshire, which became Scotland's largest distillery by 1733. It has been called the world's first commercial distillery. Stein had taken over some land and distilling operations from a local monastery. (Stein's distillery is now in ruins, and fund-raising was attempted in early 2015 in an effort to try to preserve its remnants.)

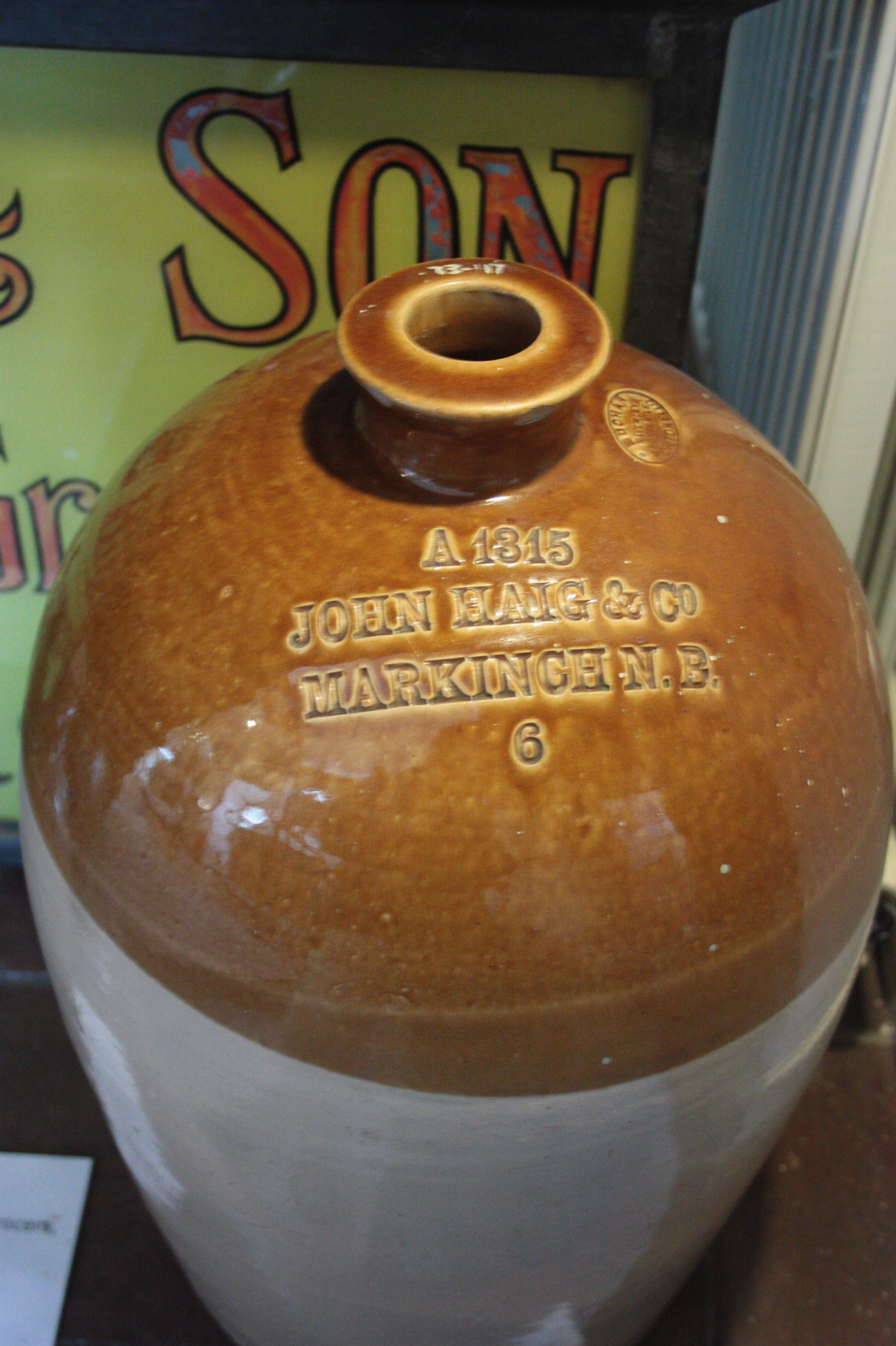
A John Haig whisky flagon from Markinch, Fife Folk Museum

Robert Haig was a distiller in the early 1600s and a member of the Scottish Clan Haig family. His great-grandson Kane McKenzie Haig, who lived in the Kennetpans area, married Margaret Stein of the Stein family in 1751.

The heritage of the two families, who owned significant farming and whisky interests, led to the development of new distilleries throughout Scotland and Ireland. Many of the Scottish distilleries went into sequestion as a result of the Lowland Licensing Act 1788, which contributed to the growth of whisky production in Ireland in this period.

The daughter of Margaret and Kane, also named Margaret, married a local lawyer John Jameson from Alloa in 1788. On marriage, John and Margaret Jameson moved to Dublin to run a new Stein family distillery in Bow Street which had been opened in 1780. Contrary to popular belief, the Jameson Irish Whiskey company was not actually founded in 1780, but in 1810 when John Jameson bought the distillery from his wife's cousins, the Steins. The original Jameson Distillery in Bow Street is now home to the Jameson Visitor Centre.

John Haig, the son of Margaret Stein and Kane Haig, led to the emergence of the company that is today Haig and Co when he founded the Haig distillery, known as the Cameronbridge distillery, in 1824. In 1830, it became the first distillery to produce grain whisky using the column still method invented by Robert Stein in 1826 (before the later better-known refinement developed by Aeneas Coffey).

John Haig & Co. was subsequently merged into the Distillers Company Limited (DCL) in 1877.

DCL combined with John Walker & Son and Buchanan-Dewar in 1925 and was then acquired by Guinness in 1986, which put it into its United Distillers subsidiary in 1987. Guinness then merged with Grand Metropolitan to form Diageo in 1997.

Most current variations of the Haig brand are produced using spirits from Diageo's Glenkinchie distillery and Linkwood distillery.

== Bottle design ==
Haig was bottled in a distinctive three-sided bottle with dimpled sides, starting in the 1890s. The bottle was registered as a trademark in the US in 1958 by Julius Lunsford. It and the bottle design for Coca-Cola (which was also registered by Lunsford) were the first two bottle designs to appear in the Principal Register of the United States Patent and Trademark Office.

== Products ==
Haig offers four whiskies:

- Haig Club, described as "light and sweet", in a rectangular blue bottle. It was launched in 2014 as a single grain whisky with no age statement, in association with David Beckham and Simon Fuller. The spirits for Haig Club are sourced from the Cameron Bridge distillery. The range includes Mediterranean Orange Spirit Drink, made with single grain whisky and other natural orange flavours.
- Haig Gold Label, in a low-shouldered round bottle.
- Haig Dimple, a more expensive blend with "a heavier malt influence of whiskies from Glenkinchie and Linkwood", labelled as 15 years old, in the dimpled, three-sided bottle.
- Haig and Haig Dimple Pinch, the U.S. version of Haig Dimple.

== Promotions ==
One of their best known advertising slogans was "Don't be vague, ask for Haig." Another was "an inch of Pinch, please!".

== Fictional Depictions ==
Until 1966, when Tintin and the Black Island was first published in Britain, Hergé had referenced John Haig whisky several times in Tintin. However, the British publisher asked Hergé to change the name to not reflect an existing commercial company, so Hergé changed all references of whisky to the then fictional Loch Lomond whisky instead. Ironically, the new Loch Lomond distillery was just starting up at the time.
