= Glen Elgin distillery =

Scotch single malt whisky distillery

Coordinates: 57°35′56.65″N 3°16′39.22″W

Glen Elgin
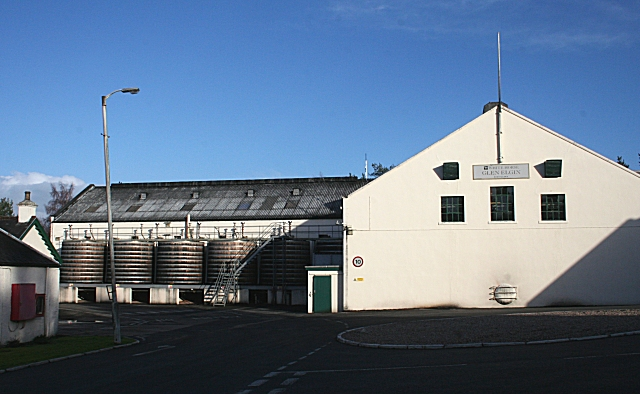
- Owner: Diageo
- Founded: 1898
- Status: Active
- Water source: Millbuies Loch Springs
- No. of stills: 3 wash stills (7000 litres); 3 spirit stills (8000 litres)
- Capacity: 1,830,000 litres

Glen Elgin distillery is a Scotch single malt whisky distillery in Fogwatt, Moray, Scotland.

== History ==
The Glen Elgin distillery was built by William Simpson and James Carle in 1898.

in 1936, the distillery was purchased by Scottish Malt Distiller, a subsidiary of The Distillers Company. The whisky produced started to be used in White Horse blends and since 1977 in single malt whisky.

In 1987, The Distillers Company was renamed as United Distillers.

In 1997, with the merger of Guinness plc (United Distillers owner) and Grand Metropolitan, Glen Elgin distillery become part of the new company, Diageo.

== Products ==
The distillery formerly produced a 12-year-old, 16-year-old, 20-year-old and 32-year-old whiskey, and now only produces a 12-year-old.
