= Justerini & Brooks =

English merchant of fine wine and spirits

Coordinates: 51.5065°N 0.1395°W

Justerini & Brooks Ltd.
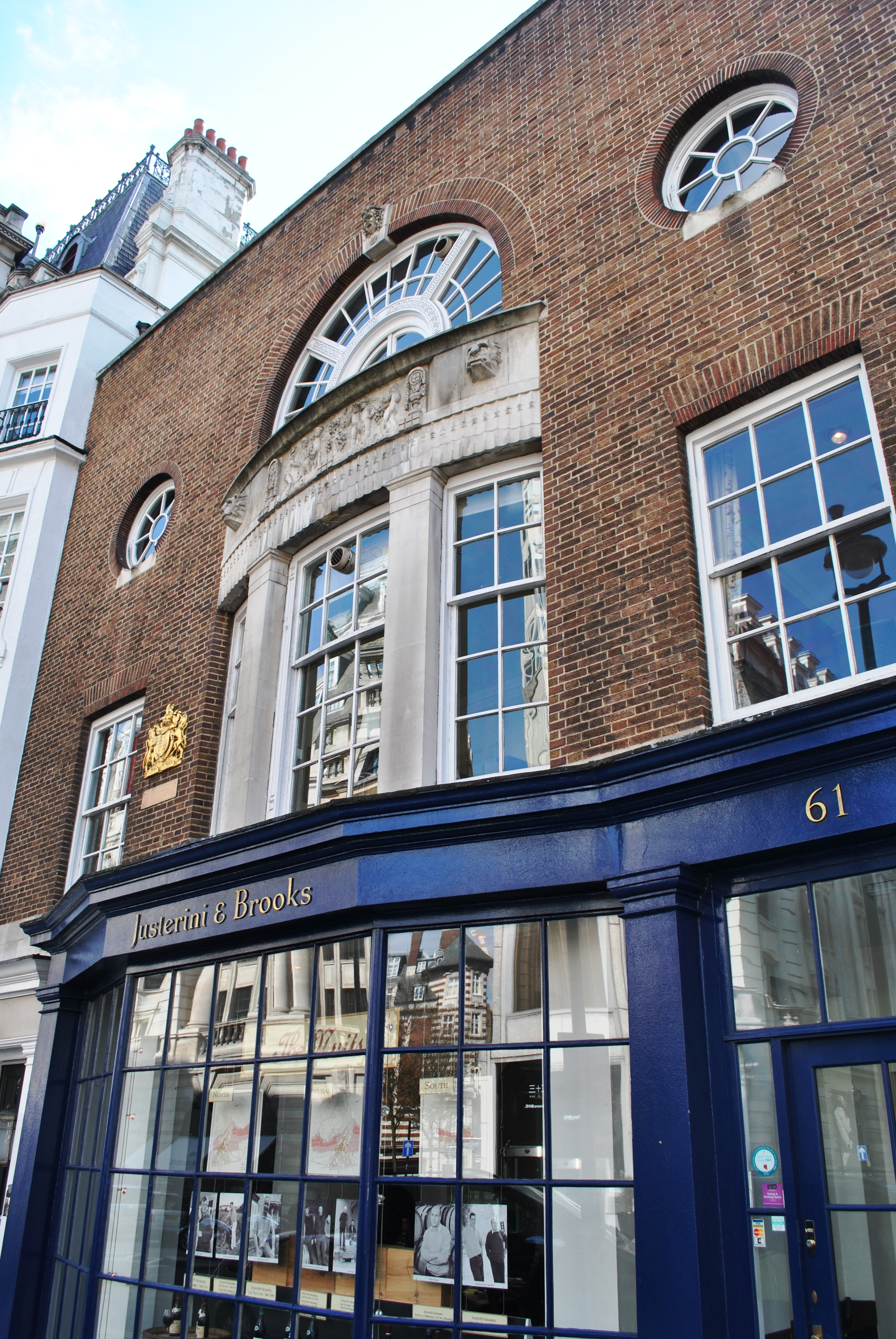
- Industry: Manufacturing and distillation of liquors and wine
- Headquarters: London, England, UK,
- Products: Distilled and blended liquors, wine
- Website: justerinis.com

J&B Rare
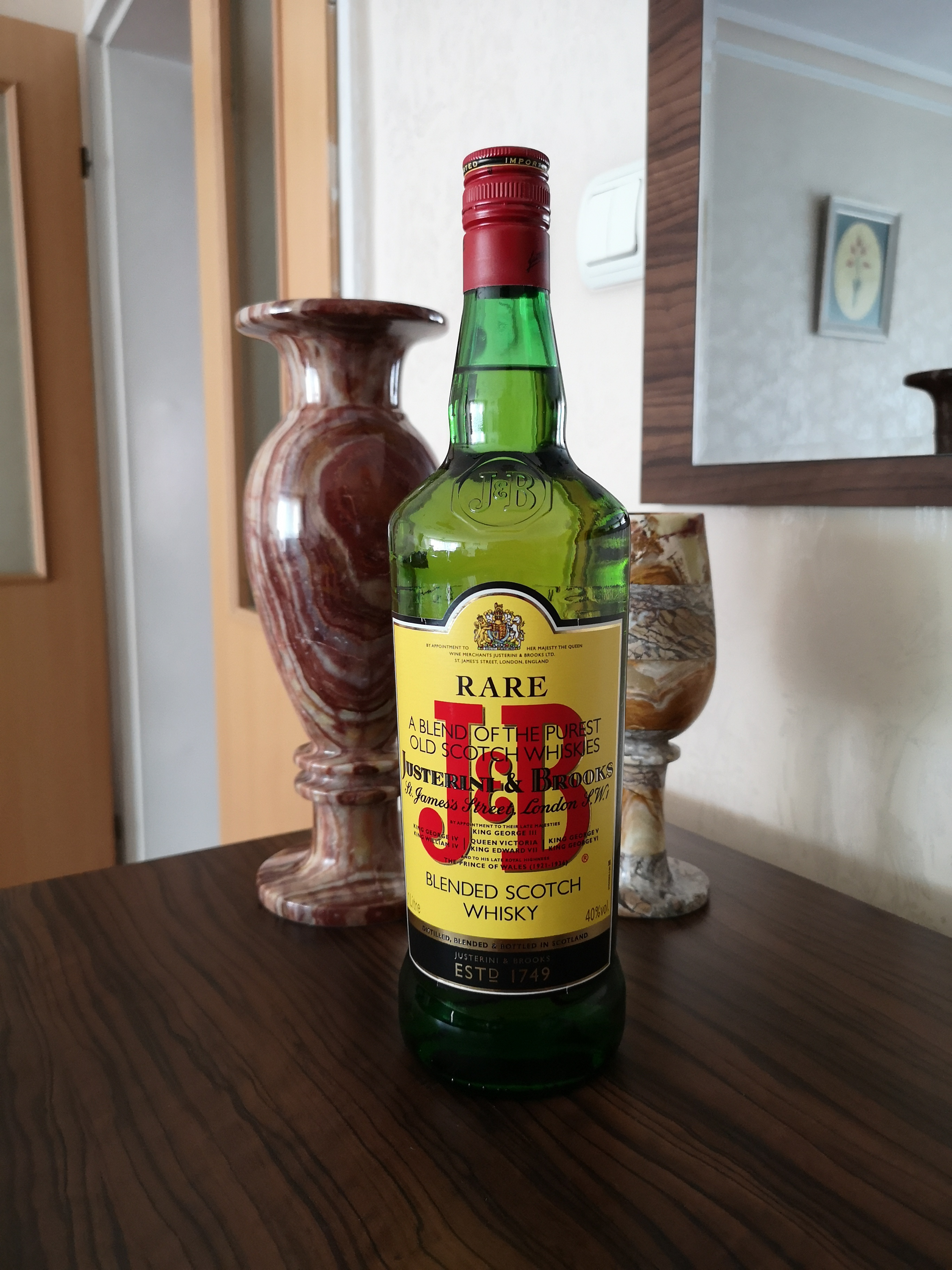
- Type: Scotch Whisky
- Manufacturer: Diageo
- Origin: Scotland
- Introduced: 1749
- Alcohol by volume: 40%
- Website: www.jbscotch.com

Justerini & Brooks Ltd. (J&B) is a fine wine and spirits merchant founded in St. James's in 1749, originally to provide wine and spirits to the aristocratic households of London. In modern times, it is mostly known for its J&B Rare Scotch whisky. The firm has been a supplier to every British monarch since the coronation of King George III in 1761. It sells to private collectors, hotels, and restaurants across the United Kingdom. Justerini & Brooks is owned by multinational Diageo.

== History ==
Justerini and Brooks was founded in 1749 by Giacomo Justerini from Bologna, the son of a distiller, and English investor George Johnson. Together, they founded the wine merchants Johnson & Justerini. In 1760, Justerini returned to his native land after selling the business to Johnson. Johnson continued to grow the business, naming his grandson, Augustus, as a partner, and building relationships with European suppliers from Bordeaux, Cadiz, Mayence, Reims, Genoa, Dijon and Palermo. The firm received its first Royal Warrant from King George III the next year.

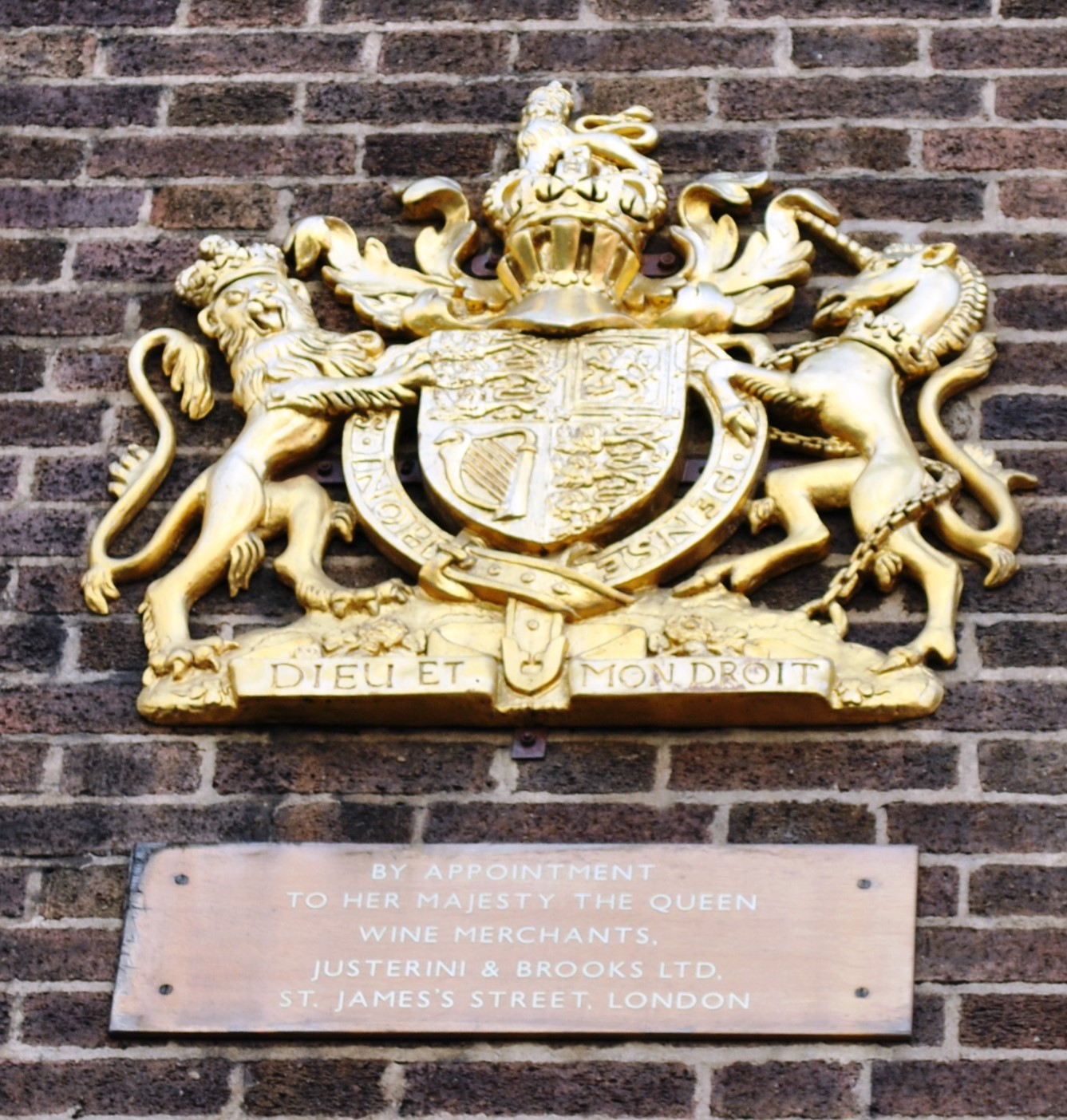
Justerini & Brooks crest

In 1831, the Johnson family sold its interest in the business to Alfred Brooks. The firm was renamed Justerini & Brooks and its headquarters were established in Regent's Park. The New York office opened in 1866.

In 1962, Justerini and Brooks merged with W&A Gilbey to form International Distillers & Vintners. The company was taken over by Grand Metropolitan in 1972.

In 1997, Guinness merged with Grand Metropolitan to create Diageo and International Distillers & Vintners was merged with United Distillers to create United Distillers & Vintners, forming the spirits division of Diageo plc.

Today, the company has four offices: the head office in St James's Street, a further office in London's Golden Square, and sales offices in Edinburgh and Hong Kong. Justerini & Brooks is also the main user of the Octavian Vaults, a giant, thirty-acre high-security cellar in Wiltshire. The company operates three other storage warehouses in Bordeaux, Hong Kong, and in Hertfordshire.

== Wine and spirits ==
Justerini & Brooks are known for their selection of fine wines from Burgundy, Barolo and Germany. They are also known for their J&B Rare Scotch whisky, a blend of forty-two malt and grain whiskies, including single malts Knockando, Auchroisk, Strathmill and Glen Spey.

== In popular culture ==
Throughout the 1970s, J&B whisky bottles cropped up with remarkable regularity in Italian poliziotteschi, commedia sexy all'italiana and particularly giallo films as a signifier of sophistication and virility, probably influenced by the brand's popularity among the Italian American celebrities Frank Sinatra and Dean Martin.

J&B scotch is the preferred spirit of R.J. MacReady (portrayed by Kurt Russell), in the 1982 John Carpenter film The Thing, and is shown drinking it on multiple occasions throughout the film.

In the 1987 film Moonstruck, Ronny shares a bottle of J&B scotch with Loretta at his apartment after she asks him for a glass of whiskey.

The character of Shelley "The Machine" Levene played by Jack Lemmon asks the bartender in the Chinese restaurant for "A quick J&B" in the 1992 film version of Glengarry Glen Ross.

In the novel American Psycho by Bret Easton Ellis, the main character Patrick Bateman is a habitual drinker of J&B.

In the Disney series Get Back, The Beatles drink J&B whisky with Coca-Cola and George Harrison remarks on its unique flavor and smoothness.
