= Glen Spey distillery =

Whisky distillery in Moray, Scotland

Coordinates: 57°31′32.2″N 3°12′36.4″W

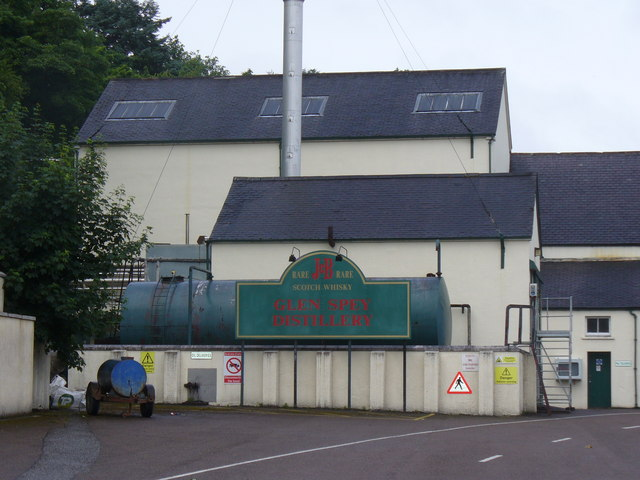

Region: Speyside
- Location: Rothes, Moray
- Owner: Diageo
- Founded: 1878
- Status: Operational
- Water source: Donnie Burn
- No. of stills: 2 wash (12,000 L); 2 spirit (7,500 L)
- Capacity: 1,400,000 litres of alcohol per annum

Glen Spey distillery is a single malt Scotch whisky distillery in Rothes, Moray at the centre of the Speyside whisky producing area of Scotland.

== History ==
Glen Spey distillery was built in 1878 by James Stuart & Co. under the name 'Mill of Rothes'. It actually started its life as an oatmeal mill - founder James Stuart was a corn merchant before he ventured into the whisky world. The distillation equipment was simply added to the existing mill in the years before the Glen Spey distillery was sold to the Gilbey company of London in 1887.

In 1962, W&A Gilbey merged with United Wine Traders to form International Distillers and Vintners.

It expanded production capacity from two to four stills in 1970.

In 1998, International Distillers & Vintners was merged with United Distillers to create United Distillers & Vintners, forming the spirits division of Diageo.

== Production ==
Glen Spey (along with Glenlossie and Strathmill) continues to use 'purifiers'. Purifiers act as small condensers, returning a proportion of the alcohol vapours back to the pot to be re-distilled. So, this would increase the amount of 'reflux' within the pot stills. This results in a lighter spirit.

During its history, the distillery has released only a handful of official bottlings. Nearly its entire production is used in J&B blends.
