= Thomas Sheridan & Sons =

Thomas Sheridan & Sons is a distillery in Ireland that is known for its liqueur products, specifically cream based alcoholic beverages.

Once owned by the Gilbey's Group, that is now owned by International Distillers & Vintners. Historically, produces Baileys Irish Cream and Sheridan's Cream Liqueur. Their address is located at T. Sheridan & Sons (Thomas Sheridan), Nangor Road, Dublin 12, Ireland.

The plant is not open to public visits, but private tours can be arranged by calling the plant's public relationship office well in advance.
