= Mortlach distillery =

Distiller of Scotch whisky in Dufftown, Moray, Scotland

Coordinates: 57°26′34″N 03°07′22″W

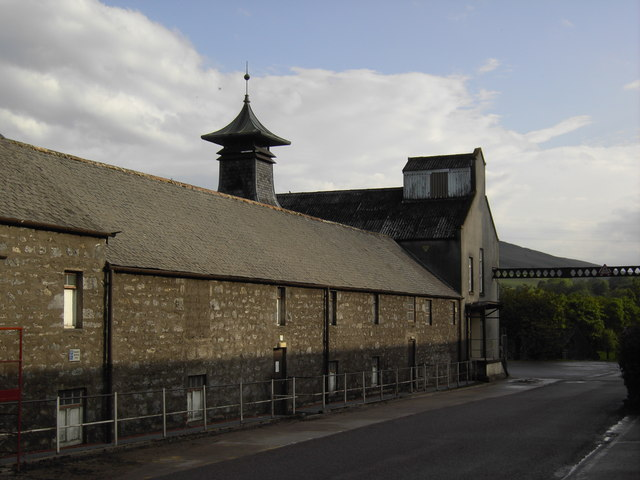

Region: Speyside
- Location: Dufftown, Moray, Scotland
- Owner: Diageo
- Founded: 1823
- Status: Active
- Water source: Dykehead Catsvraig
- No. of stills: 3 wash stills 3 spirit stills
- Capacity: 3,700,000 litres

Mortlach distillery is a Speyside single malt Scotch whisky distillery in Dufftown, Moray, Scotland. Founded in 1823, the distillery is owned by Diageo. The whisky is a key component in several Johnnie Walker bottlings, and Diageo also markets four Mortlach single malts.

== History ==
Established in 1823 by James Findlater in the wake of the Excise Act, on the site of an older illicit distillery, Mortlach was the first legal distillery in Dufftown. It was the only distillery in Dufftown until Glenfiddich was founded in 1887. Glenfiddich founder William Grant, worked at Mortlach distillery, and was even appointed the manager, for 20 years previous to this. Back then the output was about 50 gallons per week and it was generally sold direct off the still in 9 or 10 gallon casks to the very few well-to-do local gentry who could afford it. The price was about 9\- per gallon duty paid. There were few roads of any consequence and delivery was usually by pack pony over the rough hill tracks.

In its early years, between 1823 and 1853 the distillery passed from owner to owner, at one point even becoming a brewery. In 1853, engineer George Cowie, who had worked with Thomas Grainger and John Miller, joined John Gordon as owner of the distillery.

In 1867 George Cowie became sole owner of the distillery. The Elgin Courant wrote in 1868 that "There is not perhaps a distillery in Scotland that has so many private customers as Mortlach from whisky spirits are sent not only over the three kingdom's to families, but to America, India, China and Australia, in all of whisky Mr Cowie has customers who prefer his distillation to all others".

Born in 1861, Alexander Mitchell Cowie graduated in medicine from the University of Aberdeen before moving to Vienna and then Hong Kong. In 1896 when he found out his father was falling ill, Alexander returned to Dufftown and took control of the distillery. Working with the distillery architect Charles C Doig, Mortlach was expanded in 1897, the 2.81 distillation process was put into place and the railway siding known as the 'Strathspey line' linked it directly to Dufftown. The distillery also received electrical lighting in 1898, one of the first in the area. Alexander became chairman of the North of Scotland Malt Distiller's Association.

In 1923 John Walker and Sons bought the distillery and much of its whisky was used in their blends. The company joined Distillers Company in 1925.

Guinness acquired The Distillers Company in 1986. Guinness merged with Grand Metropolitan in 1997 to form Diageo.

In 2014, owner Diageo launched four luxury single malts under the Mortlach name.

In 2023, Gordon & MacPhail Connoisseurs Choice 31 Year Old, made by Mortlach Distillery in 1989, won the title of 'Whisky of the Year' at the annual International Whisky Competition.

== Mortlach bottlings ==
=== Mortlach single malt Scotch whisky ===
- Mortlach 12-years old, The Wee Witchie, 43,4%
- Mortlach 16-years old, Distiller's Dram 43,4%
- Mortlach 20-years old, Cowie's Blue Seal, 43,4%
- Mortlach 14-years old, Alexander's Way, 43,4% - Travel Retail exclusive

=== Mortlach single malt Scotch whisky 2014-2018 ===
- Mortlach Rare Old
- Mortlach Special Strength
- Mortlach 18
- Mortlach 25

=== Flora and fauna series ===
- Mortlach 16-year-old, (43% ABV) – discontinued as of the release of the above

=== Mid 20th century bottlings ===
- 1945: George Cowie & Son Ltd, Dufftown, bottled for US importers L. Bamberger & Co, Newark, New Jersey (86.8 proof)
- 1970s: Mortlach Single Malt Whisky, George Cowie & Son Ltd, Dufftown, no age statement (40% ABV)

=== Rare malts series ===
- 1995: Mortlach 22-year-old, distilled 1972 (65.3% ABV)
- 1998: Mortlach 20-year-old, distilled 1978 (62.2% ABV)

=== Cask strength ===
- 1997: Mortlach Limited Edition, distilled 1980: bottled at cask strength (63.1% ABV)

=== The Managers’ dram series ===
- 2002: Mortlach 19-year-old (55.8% ABV)

=== Special releases series ===
- 2004: Mortlach 32-year-old, distilled 1971 (50.1% ABV)
- 2019: Mortlach 26-year-old (53.3% ABV)
- 2020: Mortlach 21-year-old (56.9% ABV)
- 2021: Mortlach 13-year-old (55.9% ABV)
- 2022: Mortlach - The Lure of the Blood Moon (57.8% ABV)
- 2023: Mortlach - The Katana's Edge (58.0% ABV)

=== Managers’ choice series ===
- 2009: Mortlach Managers’ Choice, distilled 1997, bottled 2009 (Single Cask, edition of 240 bottles only – 57.1% ABV)
- Speyside Festival 2013: Limited edition from hand-picked casks; non-chill filtered (48% ABV)
