= Glen Ord distillery =

Whisky distillery in Highland, Scotland

Coordinates: 57°31′20″N 4°28′32″W

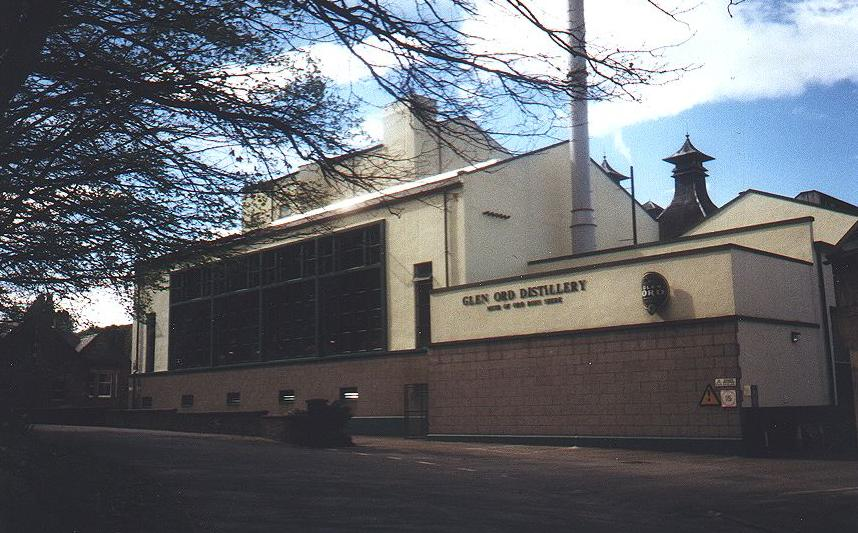
- Location: Ross-shire
- Owner: Diageo
- Founded: 1838
- Status: Operational
- Water source: Loch nam Bonnach; Loch nan Eun form the White Burn
- No. of stills: 7 wash (17,000 L); 7 spirit (16,000 L)
- Capacity: 12,000,000 litres

The Singleton Of Glen Ord
- Type: Single malt
- Age(s): 12 Years; 15 Years; 18 Years
- Cask type(s): American White Oak, Ex-Bourbon Casks (50%); Oloroso Sherry Casks (50%)
- ABV: 40% – 46%

Glen Ord distillery is a whisky distillery in the Scottish Highlands.

Glen Ord distillery produce a 12 year old, 15 year old and an 18 year old single malt The Singleton of Glen Ord that's available for export only to Southeast Asia. The distillery won awards for the best single malt at the International Wine and Spirit Competition in 1994 and 1996, and at the Monde Selection in 1996 and 1997. However, IWSC and Monde Selection awards are non-competitive and only products that pay to enter are judged.

== History ==
In the mid-13th century, the MacKenzies of Ord were granted lands in the west of Scotland by King Alexander III. In 1820, Thomas MacKenzie of Ord inherited the estate embarked on rejuvenating the area. A large portion of MacKenzie's land was devoted to the cultivation of barley, as such he decided to lease the land for a distillery to be built, this would also provide year-round employment for local men.

At the time, there were nine small licensed distilleries operating in the area to compete with, the majority of which were being run by ten-twelve of the tenant farmers. The whole of the barley crop was used in the distilleries as it was the fastest way of turning it into funds with which to pay the rent. Water from Loch nam Bonnach and Loch nan Eun flowed to two large water wheels from which the distillery derived its power. The water for the mashing was taken from a well known as the Cuckoo Well.

In its early days, the distillery operated under the name of the Ord Distillery Company. It employed 18 people and was founded in 1838 by licence holders Robert Johnstone and Donald MacLennan, who both eventually went bankrupt in 1847. In spite of bankruptcy, the distillery continued to operate illegally for a few years before they received another licence under new owners, Alexander McLennan and Thomas McGregor, in 1855.

By the time of McLennan's death in 1870, Glen Ord was sold throughout the British Colonies, including places as far as Singapore and South Africa. His widow married Alexander MacKenzie, a bank clerk from Beauly, who took over running the distillery in 1877. Upon taking over the enterprise, McKenzie constructed several new buildings which were burnt down soon afterwards. In 1880, he began marketing and selling some of Glen Ord under the name of Glen Oran.

In 1896, MacKenzie sold the distillery to James Watson & Son, whisky blenders of Dundee, who purchased the enterprise for £15,800. The company had previously acquired three other distilleries as they were primarily invested in selling blended high quality whiskies, particularly Watson's No. 10.

With the onset of World War I in 1917, the distillery was closed, along with a number of other similar businesses, by the government in order to preserve barley for food supplies. The distillery reopened after the war in 1919. However, the Watsons sold the company only four years later to Thomas Dewars & Sons of Perth, who amalgamated with the Distillers Company. They in turn, sold the distillery again in 1930 to Scottish Malt Distillers, a subsidiary company of Distillers Company Ltd.

The distillery closed its doors for a second time in 1939 due to World War II. They did not open again until 1946. Three years later, the distillery installed electrical wiring for the first time into the building, giving up the use of paraffin lamps. In 1958 the distillery went through another major change when the Meal mill closed. In 1961 the distillery ceased the use of their floor maltings and began using new saladin boxes. Five years later they greatly expanded production by tripling the number of coal-fired stills from two to six, outfitting them with steam-heated coils. They continued improvements in 1968 by constructing large mechanical floor maltings next to the distillery that could meet the needs of not only their operation but seven other Scottish Malt Distillers. Glen Ord, however, continued to use their own saladin boxes until 1983.

In 1985 DCL, including its subsidiary Scottish Malt Distillers, merged with Guinness plc. The resultant grain and malt distilling enterprises were organised under the name of United Distillers Ltd. In 1997 Guinness and Grand Metropolitan merged to form Diageo.

In 2001, the distillery began using Biobed Modular Plant technology to treat wastewater with low chemical oxygen demand (COD) loads. The distillery was the first company in the United Kingdom to adopt such technology.

In 2012, Glen Ord announced plans to double the distillery capacity by building a big new building with several new wash and spirit stills.

== Production ==
Today the distillery continues to produce Glen Ord whisky for Diageo, which includes the whisky in Johnnie Walker blends and Diageo's Singleton series. The distillery offers public tours throughout the year with hours on a seasonal schedule.
