= Port Ellen distillery =

Scotch whisky distillery on Islay, Scotland

Coordinates: 55°38′00.24″N 6°11′48.84″W

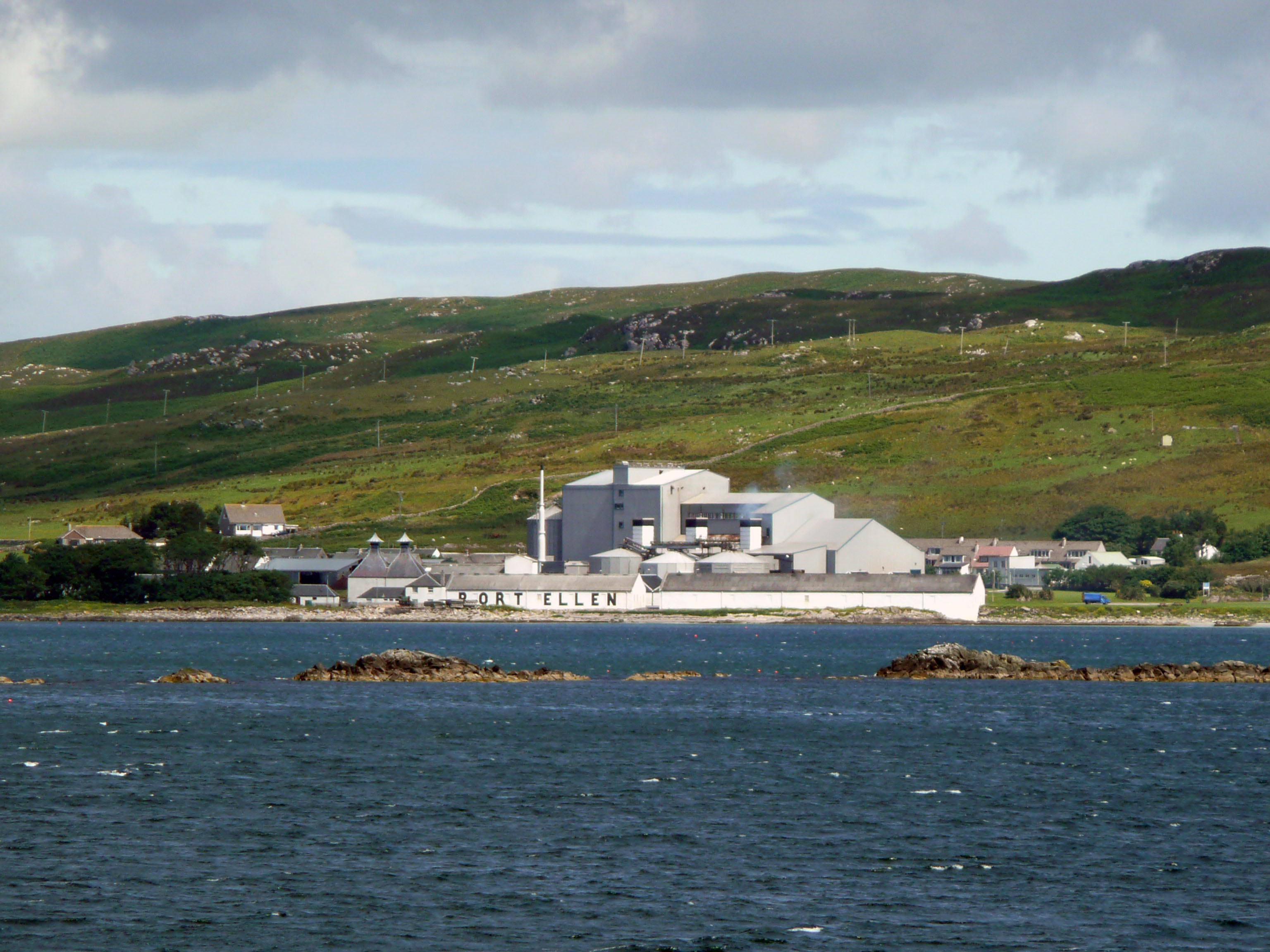

Region: Islay
- Owner: Diageo
- Founded: 1825
- Status: Active
- Water source: Leorin Lochs
- No. of stills: 2 wash 2 spirit
- Capacity: 2.7 ML
- Mothballed: 1930–1966/67; 1983–2024

Port Ellen distillery is located in Port Ellen on the isle of Islay, Scotland. Established in 1825 and closed more than once, it reopened in 2024 after having been closed since 1983.

== History ==
Port Ellen was established as a malt mill in 1825 and then developed as a distillery under John Ramsay from 1833 to 1892. The warehouses he built still exist and are listed buildings.

The distillery was acquired by The Distillers Company (DCL) in 1925, was closed in 1930, and then rebuilt in 1966/1967. It continued in production throughout the 1970s and was closed in 1983, although supplies of its single malt whisky continued to be available into the 21st century.

When Port Ellen was closed in 1983, DCL knocked down some of the buildings, repurposed others, and destroyed the stills. The distillery houses a malting which continued to supply all Islay distilleries, as per an agreement signed in 1987. After the 1983 closure, the remaining dwindling stocks of Port Ellen whisky became collector's items. Its original product was for blended Scotch, but from 1983 onwards, the whisky was matured into single malt whisky.

On 9 October 2017 Diageo, DCL's successor, announced that the distillery would reopen in 2020, following a £35 million investment in re-opening both Port Ellen and Brora distillery in Sutherland, which also closed in 1983. Diageo suggested the first new release might be of a 12 year old expression, i.e., in 2032, but left the door open for possibly earlier releases. On 8 May 2019, Diageo submitted plans to revive the distillery and to build a new stillhouse.

Diageo reported they were going to considerable efforts to recreate as similar as possible new stills, using factory records from the 1980s, as well as having former Port Ellen employees working for them elsewhere on Islay to assist in an accurate recreation of the Port Ellen style. The distillery revival was under the management of Alexander McDonald, an Islay resident with previous positions held in Kilchoman, Lagavulin and Caol Ila distillery.

In 2022, a rare 1979 cask of Port Ellen whisky was auctioned by Sotheby's. It was part of a lot that included an artwork in Murano glass by artist and designer Ini Archibong and sold for £875,000. Diageo announced that five percent of the hammer price would be donated to support Care International's work in Ukraine.

On 19 March 2024, the distillery reopened 40 years after having been closed, and following the completion of the revival work, which had ended up costing £185 million (US$235 million). In September 2025, the Port Ellen 200th Anniversary Edition, the distillery's first release since reopening, was announced. Limited to just 150 units worldwide, it was to be available for purchase from October 2025, priced at £7,500 (US$10,168) a bottle.

Port Ellen now also has whisky that is currently maturing, the Port Ellen Gemini, drawn from three 1978 European oak casks.

== Bibliography ==
- Bernhardt, Ralf; Würsching, Hans Georg (2003). The Port Ellen Single Malt Whisky Collector's Guide. Einhausen, Germany: Cluaran. ISBN 3980934411.
- Dreyer, Holger (Spring 2016). The Legend of Port Ellen Distillery. Unibuch Verlag. ISBN 978-3-934900-63-9.
