= Holy Ghost (bar) =

Bar in Portland, Oregon, U.S.

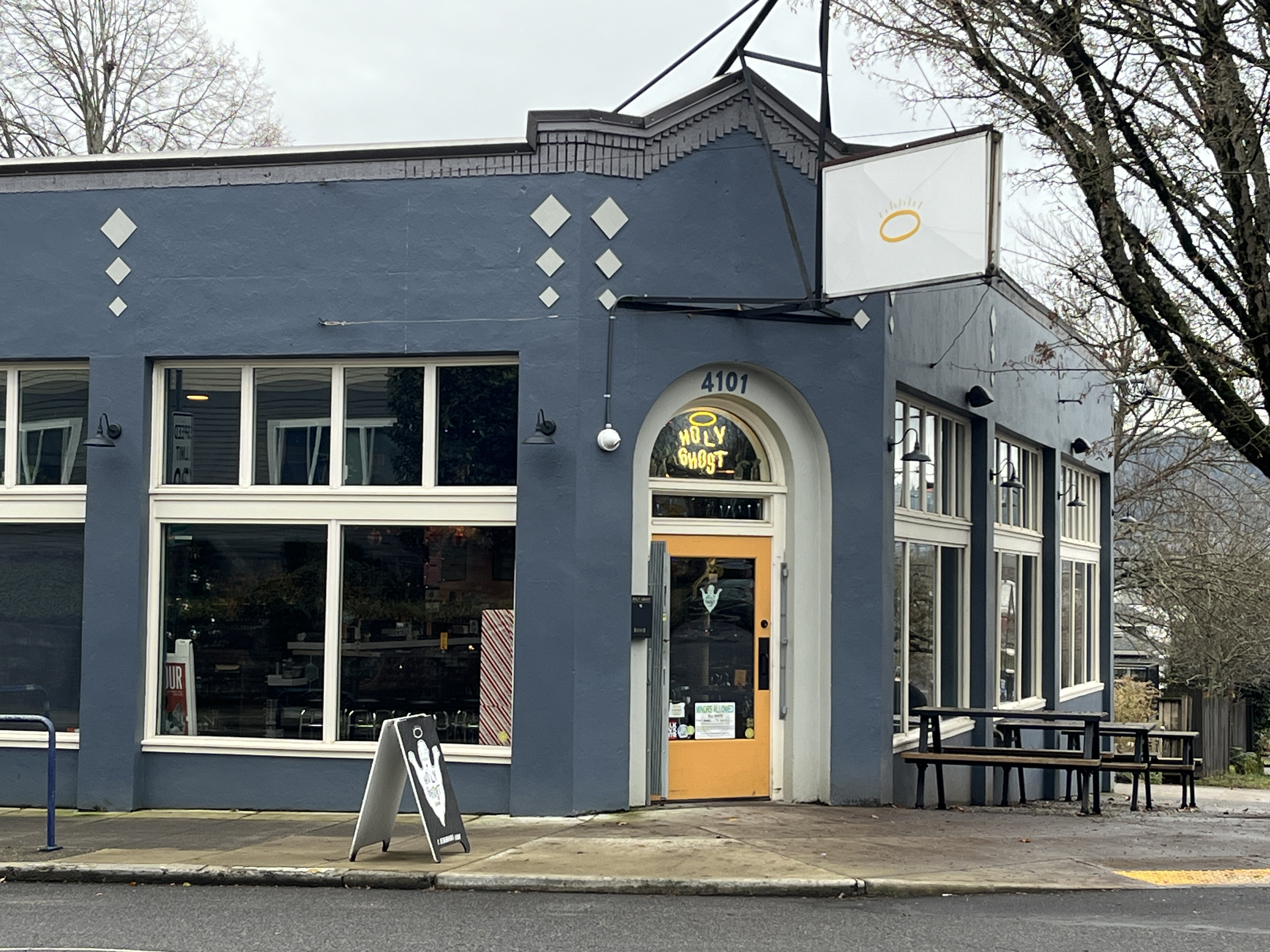
- The bar's exterior, 2024
- Interactive map of Holy Ghost

Restaurant information
- Established: November 2021
- Owner: Three on a Match
- Location: 4101 Southeast 28th Avenue, Portland, Multnomah, Oregon, 97202, United States
- Coordinates: 45.4932°N 122.6378°W
- Website: www.holyghostbar.com

Holy Ghost is a bar in Portland, Oregon, United States. The business opened southeast Portland's Creston-Kenilworth neighborhood in November 2021.

== Description ==
The bar Holy Ghost operates at the intersection of Gladstone Street and 28th Avenue in southeast Portland's Creston-Kenilworth neighborhood. The family-friendly business is named after a song by the American funk group Bar-Kays. The interior has a marble bar and buble tea shakers nicknamed Jake the Shake Roberts and Shake Gyllenhaal.

Among cocktails on the mezcal and tequila-focused drink menu is a ranch water with infused tequila, a mezcal old fashioned with Cazadores Reposado, and an Altos Plata Aperol spritz. Holy Ghost also serves a drink with bubblegum-infused vodka. The bar has a 400-bottle agave collection and also serves beer, wine (including sparkling varieties), and low-ABV and non-alcoholic drinks made with drinking vinegars, Seedlip, and syrups. One mocktail has gin, ginger, hibiscus, and raspberry, and another is a whiskey chai.

Holy Ghost also has an Agave Social Club, offering regular tastings.

== History ==
The group Three on a Match opened Holy Ghost in mid November 2021, in the building that previously housed the dive bar Pub at the End of the Universe. Holy Ghost opened alongside the pizzeria The Electric Pizza Company (or simply The Electric) and the restaurant 28 Tigers in the same building. Prior to opening, Holy Ghost was among Portland bars committed to enforcing proof of COVID-19 vaccinations.

Three on a Match planned and prepared for the bar's opening for approximately four years; according to one owner, the concept began as "a napkin with a crude sketch of a bar and a whole load of memories—albeit extremely hazy—of time we spent at the Pub at the End of the Universe". Holy Ghost underwent a remodel before opening. Ezra Caraeff's cocktail menu was inspired by a nearby agave plant.

In 2023, Holy Ghost and other Three on a Match establishments supported teachers during the Portland Association of Teachers strike. The businesses offered free drinks to teachers and an option for patrons to buy drinks for teachers. Holy Ghost and Three on a Match businesses have also bingo events by drag performer Peachy Springs.

== Reception ==
Katherine Chew Hamilton recommended Holy Ghost in Portland Monthly's 2023 overview of eleven bars with non-alcoholic drinks. Holy Ghost won in the Best Bar for Mocktails category of Willamette Week's annual Best of Portland readers' poll in 2024 and 2025.
