= Ypióca Group =

Cachaça brand

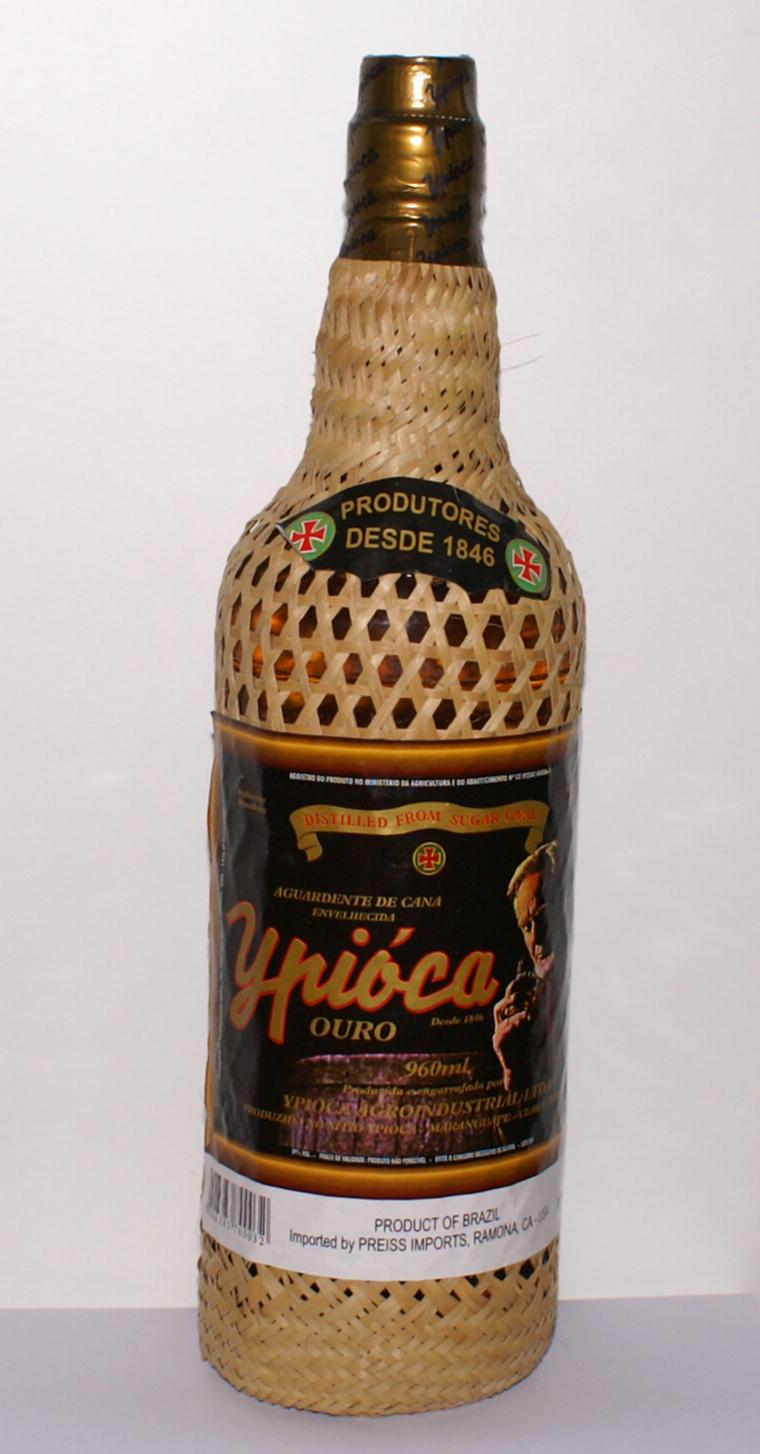
Ypióca Gold.

Ypióca Group is a Brazilian traditional manufacturer of cachaça located in the state of Ceará. In May 2012, Diageo agreed to acquire the Ypióca brand for $450 million; the deal closed by the end of 2012.

The Ypióca Group consists of seven companies which include mineral water production and farming. It is the oldest continuously active private company in Brazil.

== Products ==
The Group has many products, most of which use the name Ypióca followed by a name (like Ypióca Gold, Ypióca Crystal, Ypioca 150 etc.). Sapupara is the name of another famous product of the Group, being sold with the names Sapupara Ouro (gold) and Sapupara Prata (silver).

There are also many other Ypióca Group products, like mixed drinks (Ypióca Limão, Sapupara Limão), wines (Catuaba Garanhão and Catuaba Vinhagrinha) and Naturágua, a famous mineral water brand in Ceará.

== Production ==
The Group has five production plants, with its own fields for production of sugar cane, located in the countryside of the state of Ceará.

In the transformation and distillation of the sugarcane, the Ypióca Group uses technology imported from England and Scotland. For aging, the group uses the traditional wooden barrels.

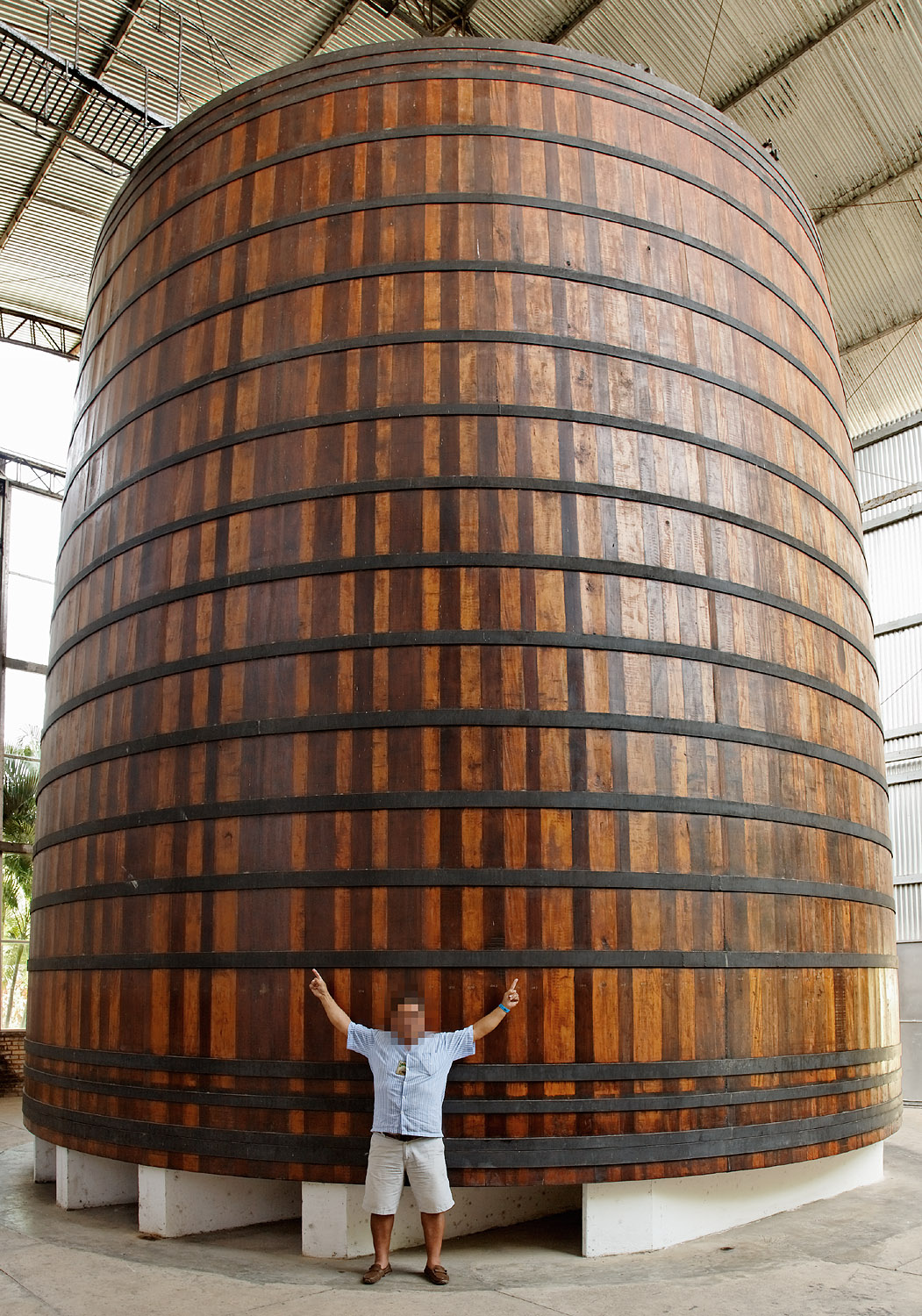
One of the largest wooden barrels in the world: 8 m tall, 7.85 m wide, capacity of 374,000 liters (98,800 US gallons), made in 2002.

== Museum ==
The Ypióca Group has, at its Museum of Cachaça in Maranguape, Ceará, Brazil, the largest wooden barrel in the world, with a capacity of up to 374,000 litres (82,000 imp gal; 99,000 US gal).
