= Auchroisk distillery =

Whisky distillery in Speyside, Scotland

Coordinates: 57.54800°N 3.11553°W

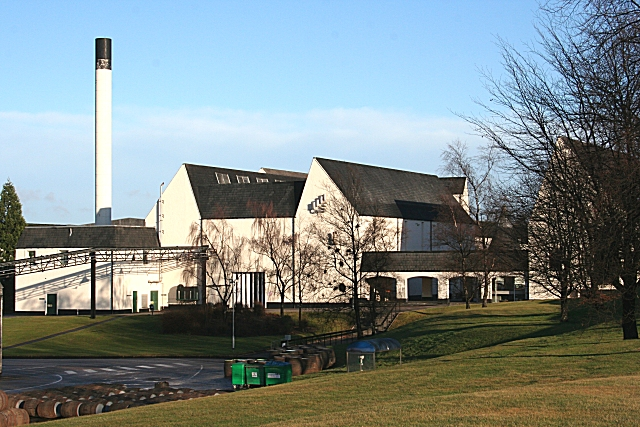
- Location: Mulben, Banffshire
- Owner: Diageo
- Founded: 1972
- Founder: Justerini & Brooks
- Status: Active
- Water source: Dorie's Well
- No. of stills: 4 wash stills 4 spirit stills
- Capacity: 3,100,000 litres of pure alcohol per year

Auchroisk distillery is a whisky distillery in Banffshire, Speyside, Scotland.

It was established after Dorie's Well was discovered and found to have water similar to the water used by the Glen Spey distillery, which was used by Justerini & Brooks to produce malt whisky for their blends. The well's water was used to produce a test batch of whisky at Glen Spey distillery, and was approved, which led to the start of construction of the Auchroisk distillery at the site of the well in 1972 to produce whisky for the J&B blend. Production started in 1974.

The distillery produced its first single malt in 1978. The single malt was rebranded as 'The Singleton' in 1986, as the name 'Auchroisk' was perceived as too difficult for consumers outside Scotland. The name changed back to Auchroisk in 2001, when bottling was released under the name 'Auchroisk 10 Year Old Flora & Fauna' in the Diageo Flora & Fauna range. In 2008 the name was changed again, this time to 'The Singleton of Auchroisk'.

The distillery is used as a hub for vatting Auchroisk with the highland whiskies used in J&B before being shipped off for marrying and bottling.

Auchroisk, the name of the distillery, means shallow ford across the red stream in Gaelic, referring to the nearby Mulben Burn.
