= Maxwell Joseph =

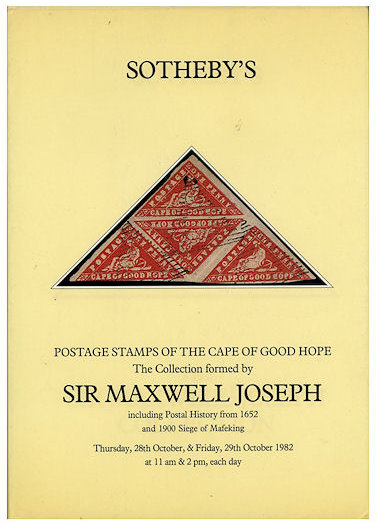
Auction catalogue for the sale of Joseph's collection of Cape of Good Hope stamps, Sotheby's, 1982.

Sir Maxwell Joseph FRPSL (formerly Max Joseph) (31 May 1910, London – 22 September 1982, Kensington) was the founder of Grand Metropolitan plc, a large British hotel group.

== Career ==
Educated at Pitman's Business School, Joseph left school in 1926 to work in an estate agent's office. He lost his job and founded his own estate agent's business in 1930 before serving as a lance corporal in the Royal Engineers during the Second World War.

He bought the Mandeville Hotel in London shortly after the War and, after buying up other hotels, built Grand Hotels (Mayfair) Ltd and then Grand Metropolitan plc into a large international conglomerate before being knighted in 1981. In July 1982 he announced his intention to retire from the chairmanship the following March but died before his scheduled retirement date.

He lived at Melksham Court in the Cotswolds.
