= Strathmill distillery =

Whisky distillery in Keith, Moray, Scotland

Coordinates: 57°32′25.5″N 2°57′40.4″W

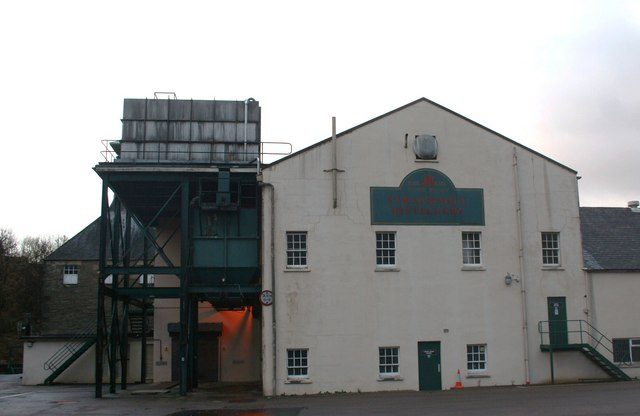
- Location: Keith, Moray
- Owner: Diageo
- Founded: 1891
- Status: Operational
- Water source: Local springs.
- No. of stills: 2 wash stills 2 spirit stills
- Capacity: 1,800,000 Litres per annum

Strathmill distillery is one of three distilleries within the Moray town of Keith at the heart of "Malt Whisky Country".

Unlike Keith's other two distilleries, Strathisla and Glen Keith, which are owned by Chivas (part of the Pernod Ricard group), Strathmill is owned by Diageo, which operates it primarily for the production of blends such as J&B whisky.

== History ==
The site had originally been home to a corn mill, established by A. G. Johnstone as Strathisla Mills in 1823, but following a boom in the whisky industry between 1890 and 1899 it was converted into a distillery in 1891. Some of the buildings therefore date to before its whisky production days. It was during this era of high demand that some thirty other distilleries were constructed in the area.

It was in 1895 when gin producers W. & A. Gilbey bought the distillery that the name was changed from Glenisla-Glenlivet to its current name of Strathmill, the name deriving from the Gaelic word 'Strath' meaning "shallow valley" and "mill" relating to its former use. In 1962 it was acquired by International Distillers & Vintners for production of malt for J&B blended whisky..

In 1998 United Distillers was merged with International Distillers & Vintners to create United Distillers & Vintners, forming the spirits division of Diageo.

== Production ==
Production equipment consists of two wash stills, two spirit stills and seven warehouses on site; five traditional dunnage warehouses and two racked warehouses. It has a production capacity of 1,800,000 litres of pure alcohol per year.

Diageo use the majority of the malt for primarily J&B blended whisky.
