= Brora distillery =

Whisky distillery in Brora, Scotland

Coordinates: 58°01′30″N 3°52′05″W

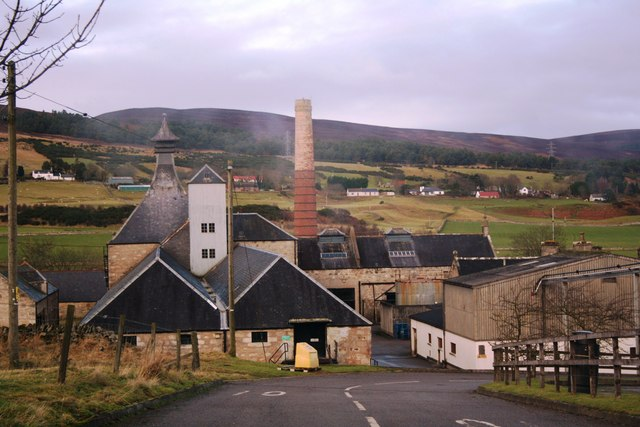
- Location: Brora, Scotland
- Owner: Diageo
- Founded: 1819
- Status: Active
- Water source: Clynemilton Burn
- No. of stills: 1 wash still (13,500 L); 1 spirit still (13,500 L)
- Mothballed: 1983-2021
- Website: www.brora.com

Brora distillery is a Highland single malt Scotch whisky distillery in Brora, Scotland. It operated between 1819 and 1983 before being mothballed until 2021, when it was reactivated.

== History ==
The Brora distillery was built in 1819 by the Marquess of Stafford, although it was known as "Clynelish" until the opening of the Clynelish Distillery in 1968, whereupon the name of the original Clynelish was changed to "Brora". George Lawson and his sons took over the distillery in 1846. In 1896 they sold it to the Glasgow blender James Ainslie and his business partner John Risk.

In 1912 The Distillers Company join John Risk and take full control of the distillery in 1925.

Between May 1969 and July 1973, Brora produced a heavily peated whisky to supply for blending; this was done to cover a shortage of Islay whisky caused by a drought in that region. Most of the whisky produced as Brora after 1973 is in the lightly peated Highland style.

In early 1983, production at Brora was stopped and the distillery was mothballed.

The release of the 1972 Brora 40 year old in 2014 was the most expensive single malt ever released by Diageo at the time, with a retail price of £7,000.

On 9 October 2017 Diageo announced that it will re-open the Brora distillery with production resuming in 2020. On 19 May 2021 it was announced the reopening was complete and the first new cask of spirit had been filled.
