= Logan (whisky) =

Scotch whisky brand

- Type: Blended Scotch whisky
- Manufacturer: Diageo
- Country of origin: Scotland
- Introduced: 1903
- Alcohol by volume: 40%

Logan is a blended Scotch whisky brand created in 1903 and belonging to Diageo.

It contains a blend of 24 grain and malt whiskies, including Lagavulin, Craigellachie and Glen Elgin.

Logan was created by White Horse Distillers. In 1927 the company was absorbed into the Distillers Company Ltd, (DCL), one of the founding companies of Diageo.

Logan has a strong presence in the Portuguese market.
