= Buchanan's =

Brand of Scotch whisky

- Type: Blended Scotch whisky
- Manufacturer: Diageo
- Origin: Scotland
- Introduced: 1884
- Alcohol by volume: 40%
- Variants: De Luxe 12, Special Reserve 18, Red Seal, Master.
- Website: Buchanan's

Buchanan's is a brand of Scotch whisky produced by Diageo in Scotland.

== History ==
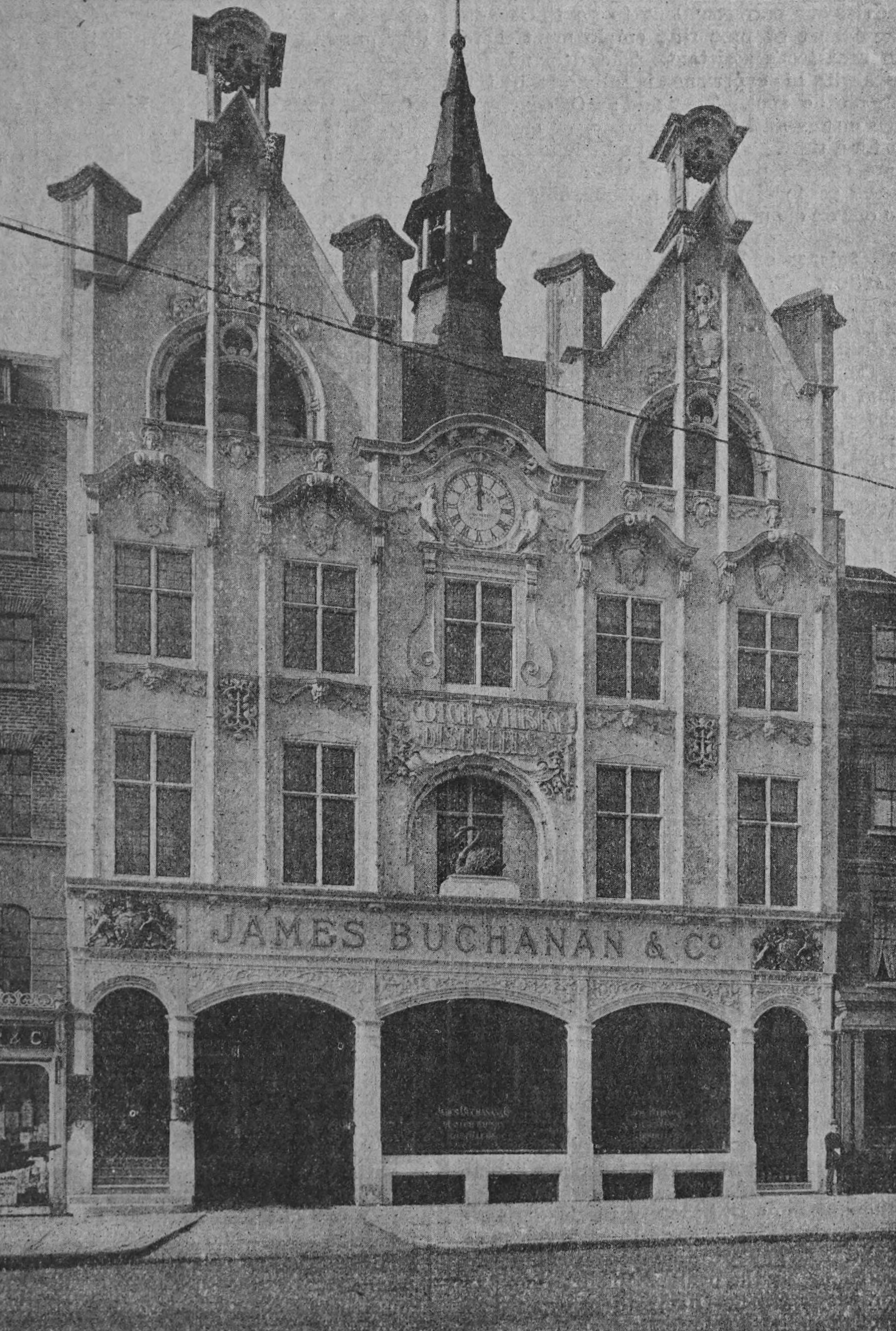
The company's headquarters at 24-27 High Holborn, designed by Treadwell & Martin

James Buchanan, born in Canada but son of Scottish immigrants, returned to the United Kingdom shortly after he was born and he was brought up in Larne. He joined a Glasgow shipping firm as an office boy when he was fourteen or fifteen, and was later promoted to be a clerk. In 1868 he joined his brother in the grain business until 1879, when he moved to London as an agent for a company in the whisky trade. He realized that there was an untapped market in England for bottled Scotch whisky and set about producing his own, the Buchanan Blend.

He went into business on his own in 1884 as James Buchanan & Co and producing the first Buchanan's Blend.

In 1898, James Buchanan was given the Royal Warrant to supply the Royal Household with Buchanan's Whisky to Queen Victoria and the Prince of Wales.

The company joined Distillers Company in 1925. Distillers was acquired by Guinness in 1986, and Guinness merged with Grand Metropolitan to form Diageo in 1997.

== Blends ==
- Black & White (Originally "Buchanan's Blend", then "House of Commons") 8
- De Luxe 12
- Special Reserve 18
- Master
- Red Seal

== Reviews ==
Buchanan's offerings have generally performed very well at international Spirit ratings organizations. The De Luxe 12-year, for example, earned a string of 3 gold medals and 2 double-golds from the San Francisco World Spirits Competition between 2005 and 2010. The 18-year was awarded three golds, a silver, and a double gold medal over that same time frame. In 2011, the Beverage Testing Institute gave the Red Seal a relatively strong score of 92 out of 100.

== Buchanan's Forever ==
Buchanan's Forever is a musical experience that honours the legacy of Buchanan's founder by way of an ongoing community enrichment program which forms part of Diageo's regional social responsibility platform, Learning for Life. Buchanan's Forever has been held in Mexico, Colombia, and Venezuela, and in each country it supports a charitable project that helps communities in each of these countries.

Buchanan's Forever artists have included: Elton John, James Blunt, Jon Bon Jovi, Fonseca, Fito Páez, Aleks Syntek, Gerry Weil, Franco De Vita, Sting and Ely Guerra.
