= Knockando distillery =

Whisky distillery in Strathspey, Scotland

Coordinates: 57°27′25.2″N 3°20′38.2″W

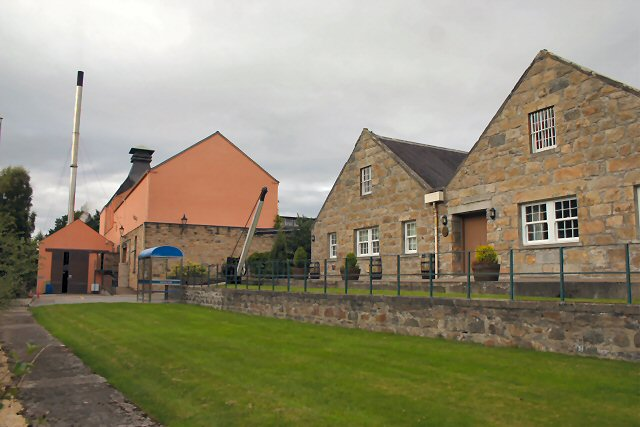

Region: Speyside
- Location: Knockando, Moray
- Owner: Diageo
- Founded: 1898
- Water source: The Cardnach Spring
- No. of stills: 2 wash stills 2 spirit stills
- Capacity: 1,800,000 litres/per annum

Knockando
- Type: Single malt
- Age(s): Bottled as a vintage (Approx. 12 Years Old)
- Cask type(s): American White Oak ex-bourbon casks / European Oak ex-sherry casks
- ABV: 40%

Knockando
- Type: Single Malt
- Age(s): 18 Years
- Cask type(s): American White Oak, Ex-Bourbon Casks / European Oak ex-sherry casks
- ABV: 43%

Knockando distillery is a single malt Scotch whisky distillery, located in Knockando, Moray, in the Strathspey whisky-producing area of Scotland.

Knockando Distillery is named after the village in which it stands. The name derives from Scottish Gaelic Cnoc Cheannachd, meaning "Hill of Commerce". The village is home to a few other small houses and the larger Knockando House, and is surrounded by woods in which there are buzzards, Red Squirrel and Roe Deer.

== History ==
Knockando Distillery was built by John Tytler Thomson in 1898.

In 1904 the distillery was purchased by W & A Gilbey, a gin producer from London.

Knockando was the first distillery in Scotland to be built with electric lighting. In 1905 it was linked directly to the Great North of Scotland Railway, which connected Grantown-on-Spey with the main towns of north-east Scotland. Cottages for distillery workers were built nearby, as well as a house for the Customs and Excise Officer.

In 1962, W&A Gilbey merged with United Wine Traders to form International Distillers and Vintners.International Distillers and Vintners become part of Grand Metropolitan in the 1970's.

In 1997, with the merger of Guinness plc and Grand Metropolitan, Knockando distillery become part of the new company, Diageo.

== Location ==
The distillery currently lies near the disused Dalbeallie Station, which is closer to the Tamdhu distillery. The railway has long since been dismantled, and now forms part of the Speyside Way long-distance walk. The old station has been renamed Tamdhu station, as the buildings are used by the distillery for meetings. Tamdhu was never named station the original line.

== Production ==
Knockando Distillery is home to a famous selection of casks which went into the J&B Ultima blend in 1994 to celebrate the quincentenary of Scotch whisky. This blend contained 128 different whiskies (116 Malt & 12 Grain) and 1 of each of these casks is still maturing in the Warehouse.
