= Sheridan's =

Irish liqueur

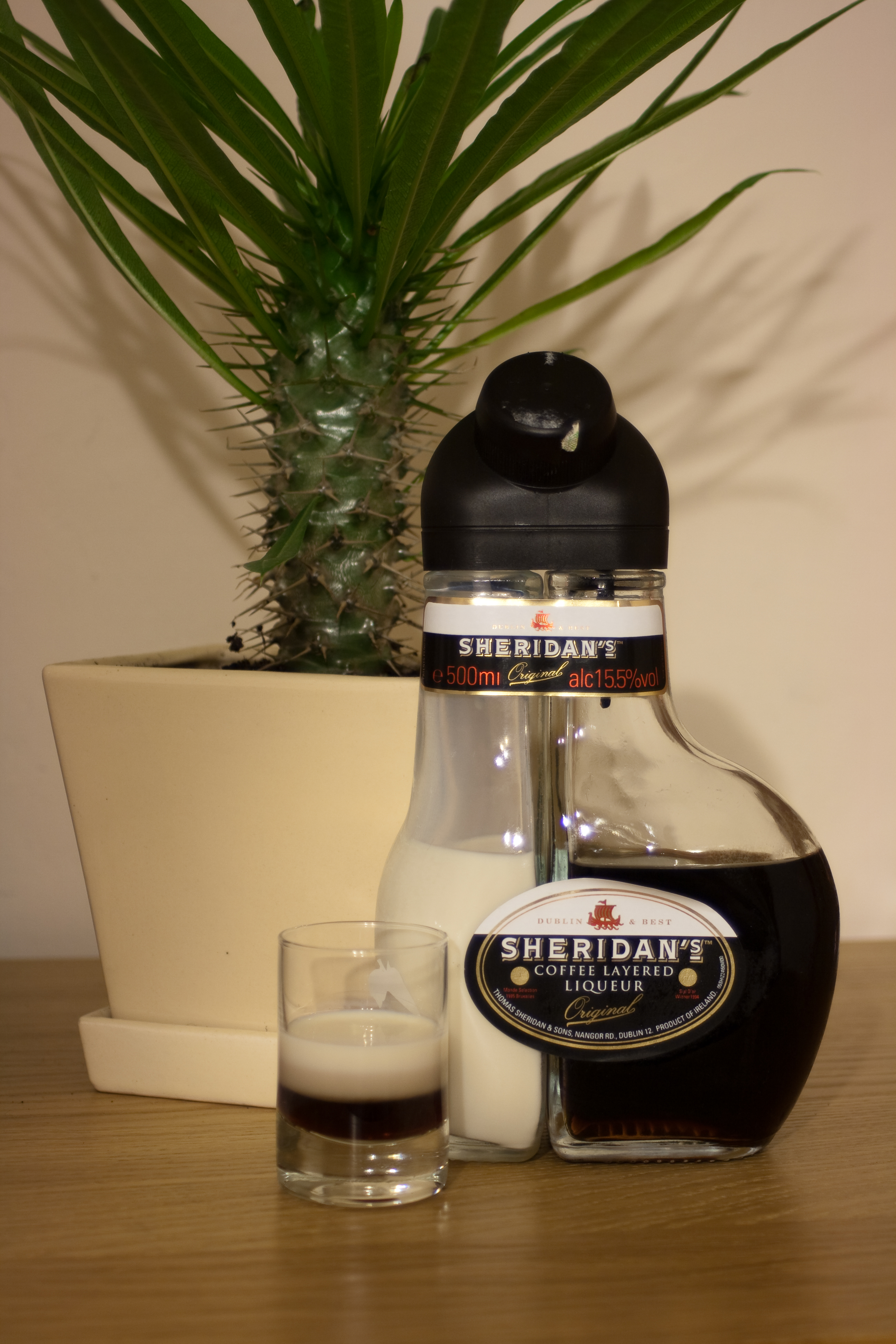
- Sheridan's Coffee Layered Liqueur
- Type: Liqueur
- Manufacturer: Thomas Sheridan & Sons
- Distributor: Casa Redondo
- Origin: Republic of Ireland
- Introduced: 1994
- Alcohol by volume: 15.5%

Sheridan's is a liqueur first introduced in 1994. It is produced in Dublin by Thomas Sheridan & Sons.

The idea was originally conceived in the 1980s by Pat Rigney (director of Research and Development for Bailey), to add another product to the single branded company. Production started in 1989 and the new facilities were built for the production at the cost of 2 million (As of 1996). The company was not able to find an Irish company who could make the glass bottles, so the original bottles were made in Italy. Currently, bottles are made in France and England.

It is uniquely bottled, consisting of two separate sections, separated by glass, but fused together. One section is filled with a black liqueur, consisting of coffee and whiskey flavors, while the other is filled with a white liqueur of vanilla cream.

In September 2025 Diageo announced they had sold the brand to Casa Redondo for an undisclosed sum, With the sale being concluded in January 2026.
