= Leven distillery =

Whisky distillery

Coordinates: 56°11′58.2″N 3°01′30.2″W

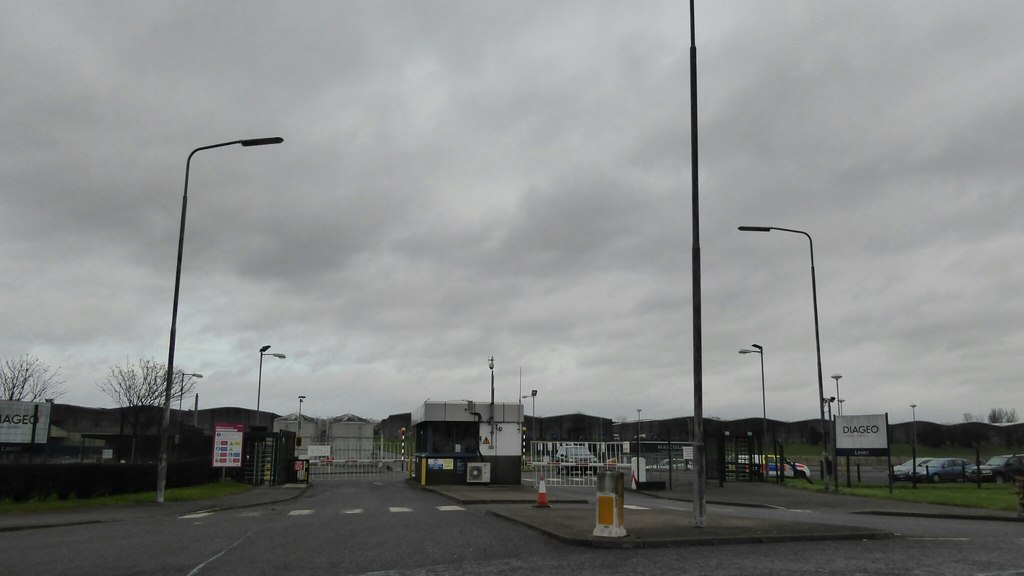

Region: Lowland
- Location: Leven, Fife, Scotland
- Owner: Diageo
- Founded: 2013
- Status: Active
- Water source: Town supply
- No. of stills: 1 wash still (1,000 L); 1 spirit still (1,000 L)
- Capacity: 250,000 L (55,000 imp gal; 66,000 US gal)

Leven distillery is an experimental distillery and bottling facility for Scotch single malt whisky in Leven, Scotland. It is owned by the drinks giant Diageo. The bottling and packaging facility claims to be the biggest packaging plant on the planet. It is also therefore reported as Diageo's largest packaging plant in the world.

== History ==
The bottling plant was created at Leven, Fife, in 1973 to bottle various Scotch whisky products. The facility also bottled non-whisky products such as Smirnoff vodka, Gordon's gin and other beverages.

In 2005, Diageo created the Leven's Process Liquid Development Area (PLDA). This was a new blending and filtration facility to focus on new product development.

In 2013, a fully functional distillery was established at Leven to allow for dedicated experimental distillation projects, becoming Diageo's 29th working distillery.

In 2023, staff at the bottling facility on the distillery site staged a series of industrial action walkouts over pay.

== Operations ==
The Leven site employs 590 people.

The site is powered by an 8,000 solar panel array.
