= Clynelish distillery =

Whisky distillery in Brora, Scotland

Coordinates: 58°01′28.5″N 03°52′05.5″W

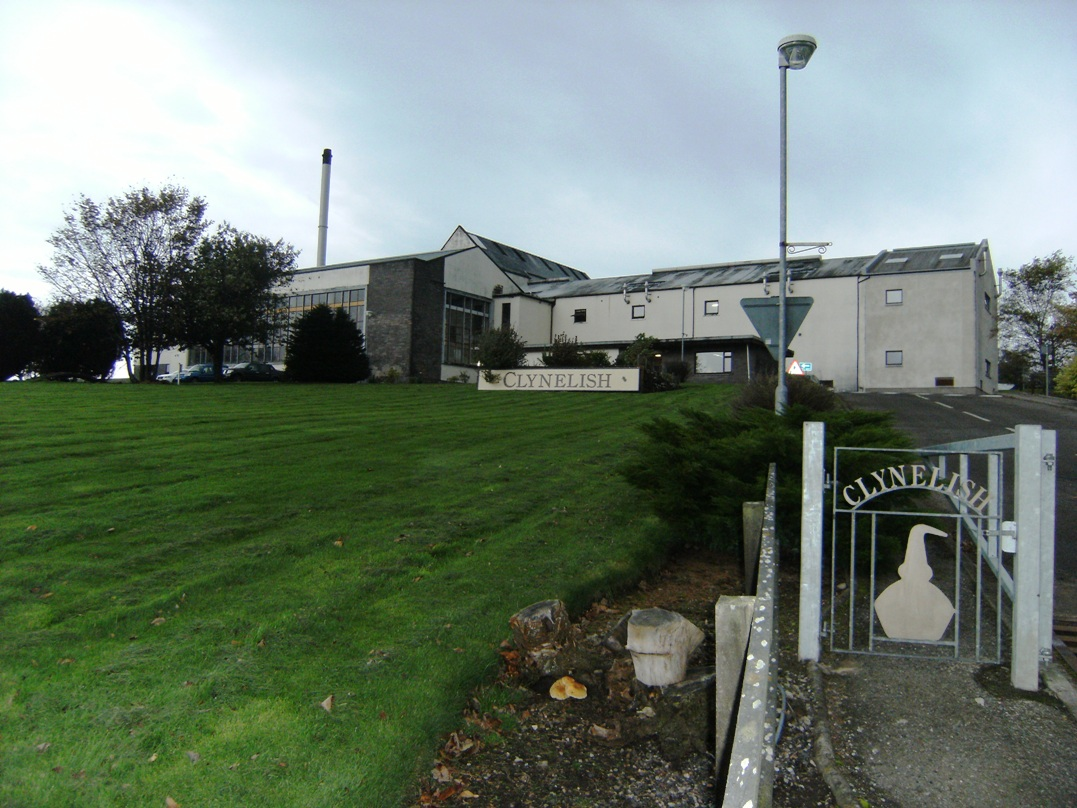

Region: Highland
- Location: Brora, Sutherland
- Owner: Diageo
- Founded: 1967
- Status: Operational
- Water source: Clynemilton burn
- No. of stills: 3 wash stills 3 spirit stills
- Capacity: 4,800,000 litres

Clynelish 14 year old
- Type: Single malt
- Age(s): 14 Years
- Cask type(s): Sherry and Bourbon
- ABV: 46%

Clynelish 20 year old Bi-Centenary bottling. (200 year anniversary)
- Type: Single malt
- Age(s): 20 years
- Cask type(s): Sherry
- ABV: 57.3%

Clynelish Distillery Only Bottling
- Type: Single malt
- Age(s): Non aged statement
- Cask type(s): Bourbon
- ABV: 48%

Clynelish distillery is a distillery near Brora, Sutherland in the Highlands of Scotland.

== History ==
The original Clynelish distillery was built in 1819, adjacent to the present Clynelish distillery, which was built in 1967. When Clynelish first started distilling, in the years 1820-1822, they were producing around 12,000 gallons (around 54,000 litres) per year. Over the years the distillery passed from owner to owner, until the distillery expanded around 1896, and was upped to around 580,000 litres. This was when they added an extra warehouse on site.

However, in the 1960s, more and more of Clynelish's spirit was going into the blends, and in the 1960s there was a boom and people were buying more luxury items such as cars and whisky. They needed to up their production levels so in 1967 they built the current distillery in which they produce today. The two distilleries ran side-by-side as Clynelish A and Clynelish B for a while, as they wanted to make sure they had perfected the taste in the new space, then they closed the older distillery.

However, in the following years, Caol Ila distillery faced a drought and closed for a year while they did refurbishments. Johnnie Walker was missing peated whisky in their blends and needed something to use in its place. So Clynelish reopened the original distillery in May 1969, under the name Brora Distillery, and started making Brora whisky. Brora's PPM levels (Phenol Parts per Million) – which describes the level of peat used in the whisky - started at around 30-35 PPM, which is on level with Caol Ila (30-35 PPM) and Lagavulin (35-40 PPM).

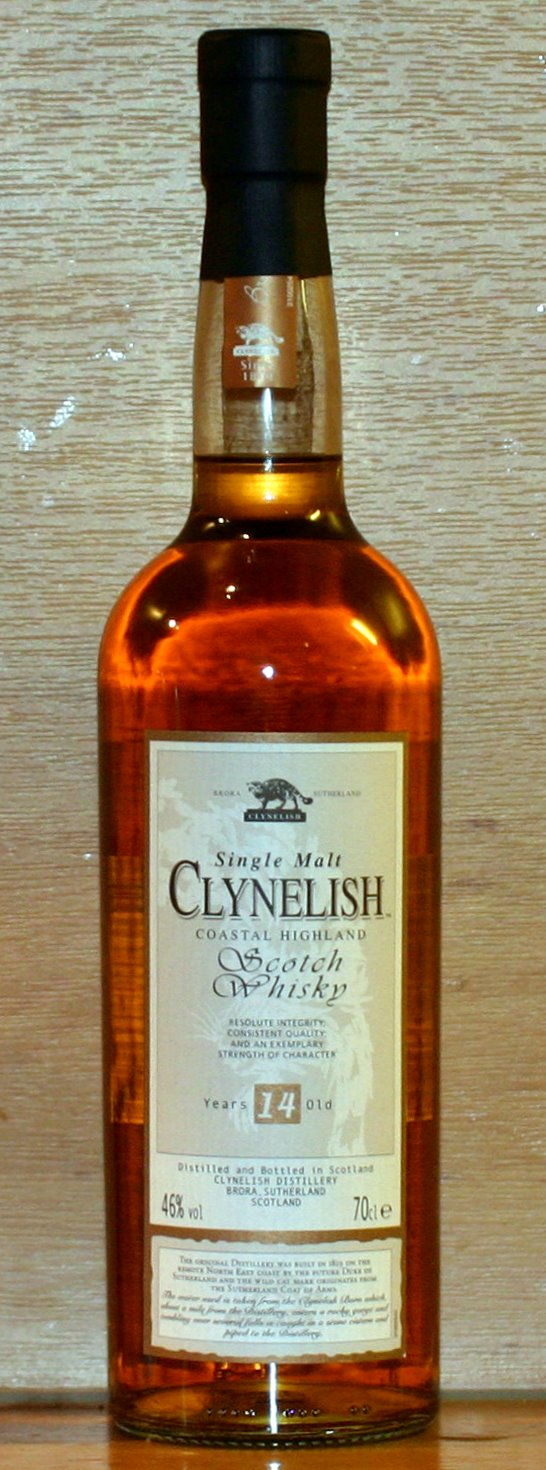
A bottle of 14 year old Clynelish

Brora went into the blends for one year whilst Caol Ila was closed and then continued to make the whisky as a single malt and ran until July 1983. Following closure in 1983, Brora whisky has become one of the most rare and desired whiskies in the world, costing around one and a half thousand pounds a bottle. Brora's latest, and last release of the original spirit is in their bi-centenary bottling, to celebrate the 200 years of production by the distillery. This bottling is a 40 year old Brora selected to celebrate the anniversary, 1819 bottles to represent the first year the distillery started production.

Clynelish has had a strong connection with Johnnie Walker blended whisky for many years. It has been described as the 'backbone' of the Gold Label Reserve.

== Visitor centre ==
As part of an £185 million investment by parent company Diageo into tourism in Scotland, the Cylnelish visitor centre was opened in April 2021, with a reported cost of £5M.

In January February 2026, Diageo confirmed it would be closing the centre with a reported lack of visitor numbers and difficulty in finding staff.
