= White Horse (whisky) =

Brand of Scotch whisky

- Type: Scotch Whisky
- Manufacturer: Diageo
- Origin: Scotland
- Introduced: 1871
- Alcohol by volume: 40%

White Horse Scotch Whisky is a blended Scotch whisky produced by Diageo in Scotland. It was first produced by James Logan Mackie in Edinburgh in 1891. In 2006, White Horse won blended whisky of the year in Murray's 2007 Whisky Bible.

== History ==
During World War 2, White Horse scotch was provided to crews of the 467th Bombardment Group during mission debriefings. The late New York Yankees manager Joe McCarthy favoured the White Horse brand of scotch. When he imbibed to excess he was said to be "riding the white horse". Other whiskies coming from the White Horse stable include Logan.

== Composition ==
White Horse is a blended whisky, as opposed to the single malt style. White Horse is particularly noted for its use of the Lagavulin.

== Popular culture ==
- White Horse is featured in Mieko Kawakami's Breast and Eggs: A Novel (2020) as the main feature of the "all you can drink special" at the Chanel Bar in Tokyo.
- In his song "Beeswing," English musician Richard Thompson sings of a travelling woman who has "White Horse in her hip pocket, and a wolfhound at her feet".
- In the late 1960s and early 1970s, the advertising slogan of White Horse Whisky was "you can take a white horse anywhere", accompanied by a white horse in various settings, such as a garden party.
- In Agatha Christie's novel The ABC Murders a letter sent to Poirot is addressed to White Horse Mansions, instead of White Haven Mansions, his correct address. The characters speculate that the sender was drinking White Horse Whisky as he typed it.
- In Richard Yates's 1961 novel Revolutionary Road, a small model horse taken from around a White Horse whisky bottle and gifted to her by her father serves as an important symbol of nostalgia, love, and hope for April Wheeler.
