= International Distillers & Vintners =

UK alcohol distribution company

International Distillers & Vintners was a brewing and wine and spirits distribution company, formed from the 1962 merger of W&A Gilbey and Justerini and Brooks.

== History ==
W&A Gilbey was founded in 1857 as a wine merchant by Sir Walter Gilbey and his brother Alfred Gilbey, but by 1962 had a diversified family share holding, chaired by former figure skater and politician, Ronald Gilbey. He had resigned from London County Council in 1958, to become chairman of W&A Gilbey, a post he held for eleven years. At the time of the merger, Gilbey's was the largest wine and spirits company in the United Kingdom.

In 1962, W&A Gilbey merged with Justerini and Brooks to form International Distillers & Vintners. The company was taken over by Grand Metropolitan in 1972.

In 1997, Guinness merged with Grand Metropolitan to create Diageo. In 1998 International Distillers & Vintners merged with United Distillers to create United Distillers & Vintners, forming the spirits division of Diageo.

== Distilleries ==
Distilleries owned by International Distillers & Vintners.

- Auchroisk
- Glen Spey
- Knockando
