= Seedlip =

British manufacturer of liquor substitutes

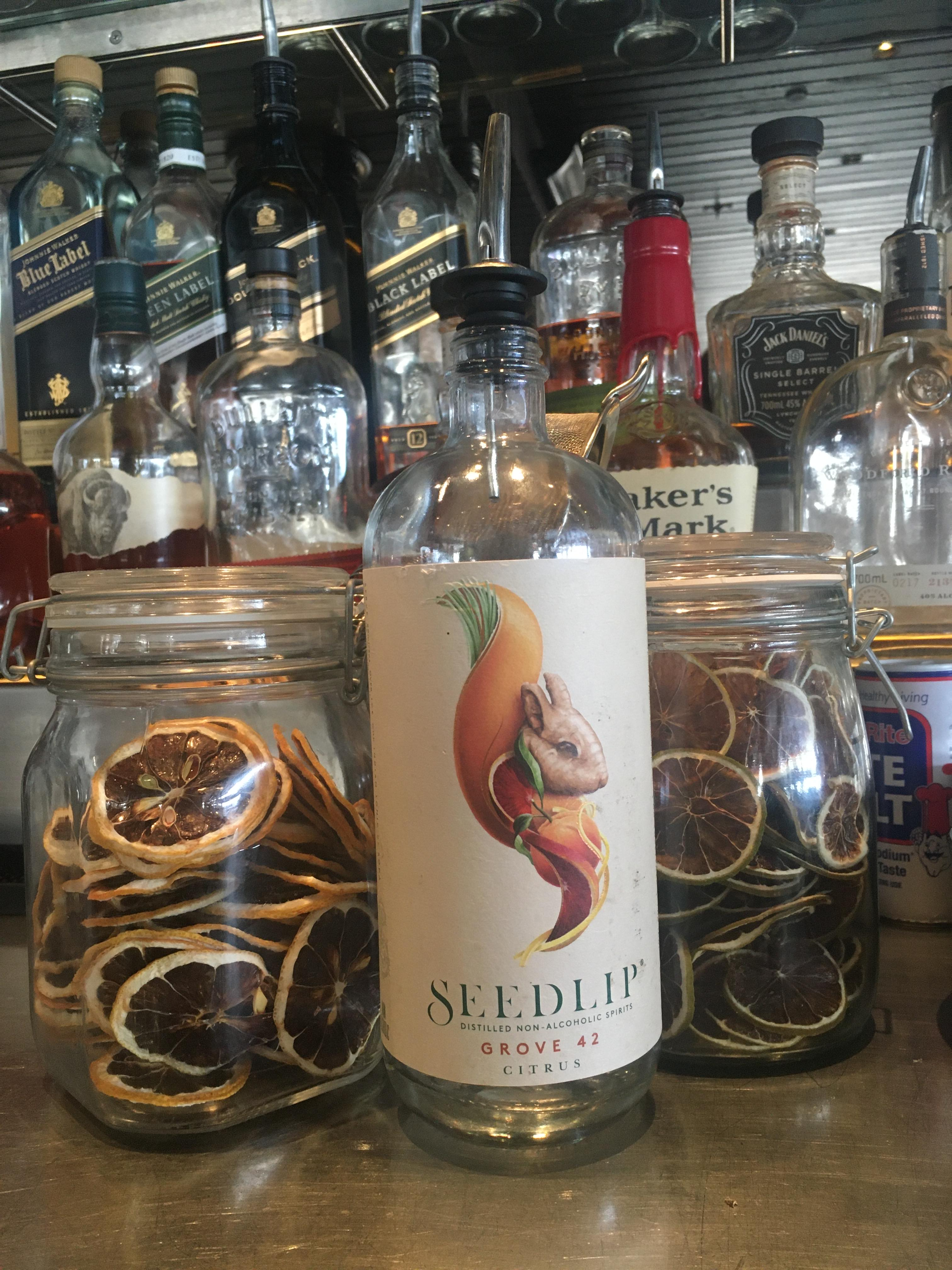
- Seedlip Grove 42 700-mL Bottle
- Industry: Food and Drink
- Founder: Ben Branson
- Parent: Diageo
- Website: https://www.seedlipdrinks.com/

Seedlip is a British company that makes plant-based liquor substitutes for use in non-alcoholic mixed drinks.

Seedlip describes its products as "the world's first distilled non-alcoholic spirits". They are sold in four varieties: "Garden 108" (peas and garden herbs), "Spice 94" (spices, citrus peels and barks), "Grove 42" (citrus and spices), and the newest "Notas de Agave" (prickly pear, lime and agave). According to their labels, Seedlip products consist of water, "natural botanical distillates and extracts (15%)", the preservative potassium sorbate, and citric acid. On their own, their taste has been described as "a sort of pleasantly pungent savoury-herby-medicinal water". Claire Lower of Lifehacker was critical of the product, writing that it added little to mocktails and that its usefulness depended heavily on the mixologist's skills and on the other ingredients.

Founded in 2014 by Ben Branson, a former luxury brand designer, the company has been majority-owned by the multinational alcohol company Diageo since 2019. The name derives from the seedlep or seedlip, a basket for carrying seeds while sowing. In December 2020, British company Lockdown Liquor & Co announced its collaboration with Seedlip in making Grove Picante, Lockdown Liquor's first non-alcoholic spirit. Grove Picante is an inspired creation from Lockdown Liquor's Picante spirit and Seedlip's Grove 42 non-alcoholic spirit. The product had launched in the UK via Lockdown Liquor's website.

== Products ==
- Garden 108 (peas and garden herbs)
- Grove 42 (citrus and spices)
- Notas de Agave (prickly pear, lime and agave)
- Spice 94 (spices, citrus peels and barks)
- Grove Picante [a collaborative creation sold by Lockdown Liquors & Co]
