= Diageo =

British multinational alcoholic beverage company

Diageo plc

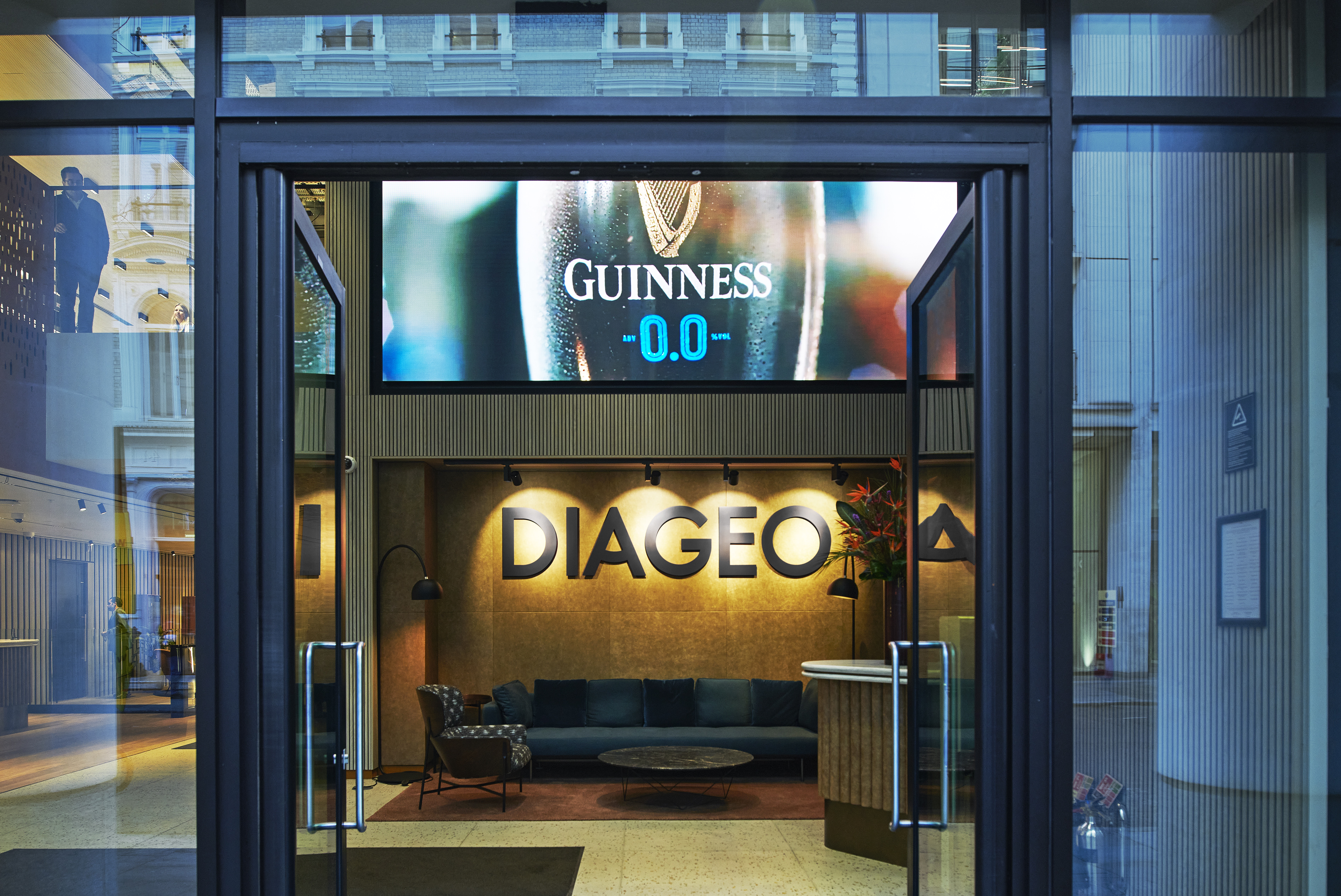
- Diageo world headquarters in Great Marlborough Street, London, England
- Type: Public
- Traded as: LSE: DGE; NYSE: DEO; FTSE 100 Component
- Industry: Drink industry
- Predecessors: Guinness Brewery; Grand Metropolitan
- Founded: 17 December 1997; 28 years ago
- Headquarters: London, England, UK
- Key people: John Manzoni (Chairman); Sir Dave Lewis (CEO); Nik Jhangiani (CFO)
- Products: Alcoholic beverages: spirits, beer and wine
- Revenue: ▼US$27.762 billion (2026)
- Operating income: ▼US$3.156 billion (2026)
- Net income: ▼US$1.958 billion (2026)
- Total assets: ▼US$46.845 billion (2026)
- Total equity: ▼US$12.954 billion (2026)
- Number of employees: 30,000 (2026)
- Subsidiaries: United Spirits (55.9%)
- Website: diageo.com

Diageo plc (/diˈædʒioʊ/ dee-AJ-ee-oh) is a British multinational alcoholic beverage company headquartered in London, England. It operates from 110 sites in 180 countries. With brands such as Guinness, Johnnie Walker and Smirnoff, it is a major distributor of Scotch whisky and other spirits, with distilleries producing 40% of all Scotch whisky with over 24 brands. Diageo is a publicly traded company listed on both the London Stock Exchange where it is a constituent of the FTSE 100 Index, and the New York Stock Exchange as American depositary receipts.

== History ==
=== Formation ===
Diageo was formed in 1997 from the merger of Guinness plc and the hospitality and distribution conglomerate Grand Metropolitan plc. The company was created by executives Anthony Greener and Philip Yea at Guinness, along with George Bull and John McGrath of Grand Metropolitan. Shares in Diageo began trading on the London Stock Exchange on 17 December 1997.

The name Diageo was created by branding consultancy Wolff Olins in 1997. It derives from the Latin word diēs, meaning "day", and the Greek root geo-, meaning "earth".

=== Early acquisitions and sale of non-core assets ===
As a legacy of the merger, Diageo owned a number of brands, businesses, and assets which were not in the core alcoholic drinks category. The company gradually disposed of these assets to focus on beverages as its core business. This included the sale of the Pillsbury Company to General Mills in July 2000, and the sale of the Burger King fast food restaurant chain to a consortium led by US firm Texas Pacific for US$1.5 billion in December 2002.

Diageo, acting in joint venture with the French drinks group Pernod Ricard, bought the Canadian business Seagram in May 2001; to secure regulatory approval it had to sell Malibu rum to Allied Domecq for £560m ($800m) in February 2002. The company further acquired Turkish liquor company Mey Icki for US$2.1 billion in February 2011, and followed this with Brazilian cachaça manufacturer Ypióca for £300 million in May 2012, and a majority stake in the Indian company United Spirits for £1.28 billion in November 2012. It bought the Chinese baijiu manufacturer Sichuan Shuijingfang Company in China in July 2013.

The predecessor company Grand Metropolitan had been a major owner of hotels, owning what is now Intercontinental Hotels prior to divestment before merging into Diageo, but the company still owned the Gleneagles Hotel in Perthshire, which had hosted events including the Ryder Cup and G8 summit. In July 2015 Diageo reached an agreement to sell the hotel to the Ennismore Group, already owners of The Hoxton hotels.

In July 2009, Diageo announced that it would be closing the Johnnie Walker blending and bottling plant at Kilmarnock in Scotland as part of a restructuring to the business, with work moved to Diageo's other two sites in Shieldhall and Leven. It would make 700 workers unemployed and attracted criticism from the press, local people, and politicians. A campaign against the decision was launched by the local SNP MSP Willie Coffey and Labour MP Des Browne. A petition was drawn up against the plans, which also involved the closure of the historic Port Dundas grain distillery in Glasgow. The Johnnie Walker plant in Kilmarnock closed its doors in March 2012 and the buildings were subsequently demolished a year later.

In August 2011, Diageo agreed to pay more than US$16 million to settle U.S. civil regulatory charges that it made improper payments to foreign officials. Regulators accused the British company of violating the U.S. Foreign Corrupt Practices Act through its subsidiaries to obtain lucrative sales and tax benefits for its Johnnie Walker and Windsor Scotch whiskies and other brands.

=== Since 2015 ===
In March 2015, Diageo released an advertising campaign showing a young woman crying after a night out, as an older woman, likely her mother, looks at her from the doorway, and the caption, "Who's following in your footsteps? Out of control drinking has consequences". The advert may have implied that the girl had been assaulted on the way home, as a result of her drinking that night. The director of Rape Crisis Network Ireland said Diageo "blames victims of sexual violence for the crimes that have been committed against them. This is a harmful, regressive and hurtful message which targets the vulnerable."

In October 2015, the company made major sales in both the beer and wine categories, selling the Red Stripe beer brand, along with interests in other breweries, and the rights to Guinness in some territories to Heineken, as well as the sale of most of its wine business to Treasury Wine Estates. The separate 2019 sale of the remaining wine brands including Navarro Correas and Chalone Vineyard saw Diageo exit the category.

In November 2016, Diageo announced its intention of selling at auction Sir Edwin Landseer's iconic 1851 painting The Monarch of the Glen – which the company owned, but which has been on loan to the National Museum of Scotland in Edinburgh since 1999 – as it has "no direct link to our business or brands", being used on the label of rival brand Glenfiddich, owned by William Grant & Sons. Following a fundraising campaign, the painting was sold to the National Galleries of Scotland for around half its assayed value of £8 million.

In November 2018, Diageo sold Seagram's whiskey brand, along with Myers's Rum, Popov vodka, Booth's Gin, Goldschläger, Yukon Jack, Sambuca, and 11 other brands to the Sazerac Company for US$550 million, but kept the Seagram's Seven Crown brand.

In January 2020, Diageo agreed to pay US$5 million to settle charges brought by the US Securities and Exchange Commission that alleged the company had pressured distributors to buy products in excess of demand in order to hit performance goals.

In March 2024, the company reopened Port Ellen distillery after it had been closed for 40 years and, in September 2024, it acquired Ritual Zero Proof, a non-alcoholic spirits brand. It formed the Diageo Luxury Group in November 2024, sold Cacique rum to La Martiniquaise in January 2025, and transferred majority ownership of Cîroc in North America to Main Street Advisors in June 2025.

In September 2025, Doug Ford, the Premier of Ontario, Canada, staged a protest against Diageo's decision to close the Crown Royal whisky bottling plant in Amherstburg and move operations to the United States. The company announced plans to close the plant by February 2026, with 180 jobs lost. At a press conference, Ford emptied a bottle of Crown Royal onto the ground, called the company's decision, "dumb as a bag of hammers," and vowed to retaliate—the provincial purchase of Diageo products tops C$740 million annually. He urged Ontarians to support locally produced whisky instead, accusing Diageo of disrespecting workers and failing to consult the union. Diageo defended the move as a necessary shift in its North American supply chain, while stating that Crown Royal would continue to be produced in Canada, with product for the Canadian market also continuing to be bottled in Canada.

== Operations ==
Diageo operates many whisky distilleries in Scotland and around the world. Other than the in-house brands, Diageo also owns a 34% stake in the Moet Hennessy drinks division of French luxury goods company LVMH. Diageo operates across Europe, North America, Latin America, the Caribbean, Asia–Pacific and Africa.

=== Leadership ===
==== Leadership ====
As of January 2026:

- Chairman: John Manzoni
- Chief Executive Officer: Sir Dave Lewis (since January 2026)
- Chief Financial Officer: Nik Jhangiani

==== Previous leadership ====
- Anthony Greener (December 1997 – September 2000): served as executive chairman
- Paul Walsh (September 2000 – July 2013): appointed CEO and led the company for over a decade
- Sir Ivan Menezes (July 2013 – June 2023): became CEO and led the company for a decade until his death
- Debra Crew (June 2023 – July 2025): became CEO following the death of Sir Ivan Menezes; resigned with immediate effect in July 2025
- Nik Jhangiani (July 2025 – December 2025): served as Interim CEO following the departure of Debra Crew

=== Head office ===
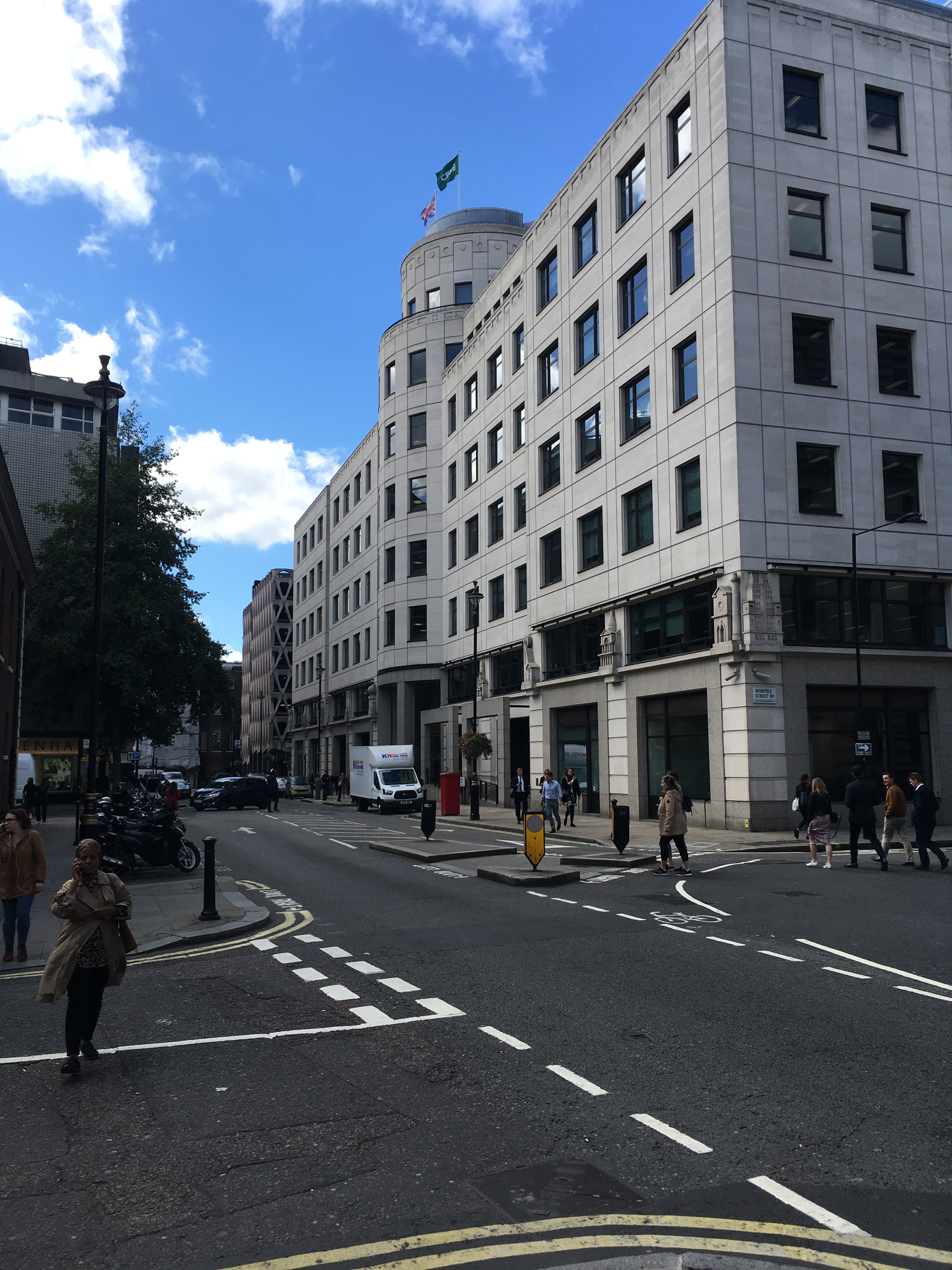
Diageo's former head office in Henrietta Place, London

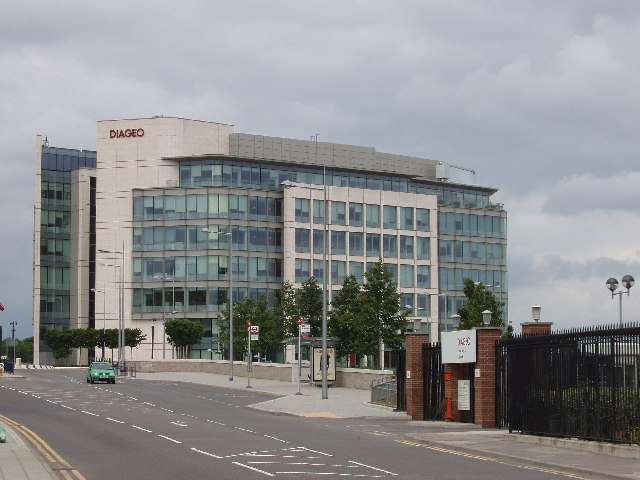
Diageo's former head office in Park Royal, West London

Diageo's initial head office facility was in Henrietta Place, in the Marylebone district of the City of Westminster in London. In 2009, Diageo closed the Henrietta Place facility to reduce costs, and moved its employees to Park Royal, London Borough of Brent, on the site of a former Guinness brewery which had closed five years earlier. In 2022, the company relocated to Great Marlborough Street, London.

=== Whisky distilleries ===
==== Scotch whisky malt distilleries ====
- Auchroisk distillery
- Benrinnes distillery
- Blair Athol distillery
- Brora distillery
- Caol Ila distillery
- Cardhu distillery
- Clynelish distillery
- Cragganmore distillery
- Dailuaine distillery
- Dalwhinnie distillery
- Dufftown distillery
- Glendullan distillery
- Glen Elgin distillery
- Glenkinchie distillery
- Glen Ord distillery
- Glen Spey distillery
- Inchgower distillery
- Knockando distillery
- Lagavulin distillery
- Leven distillery
- Linkwood distillery
- Mannochmore distillery
- Mortlach distillery
- Oban distillery
- Port Ellen distillery
- Roseisle distillery
- Royal Lochnagar distillery
- Strathmill distillery
- Talisker distillery
- Teaninich distillery

==== Scotch whisky grain distilleries ====
- Cameronbridge grain distillery
- North British grain distillery

==== Irish whiskey distilleries ====
- Roe & Co distillery

==== American whiskey distilleries ====
- Bulleit distillery
- George Dickel distillery

==== Canadian whisky distilleries ====
- Crown Royal distillery

== Brands ==
Diageo's beverage brands include:

- Scotch whisky:
  - Single malt Scotch whisky: Auchroisk, Benrinnes, Blair Athol, Brora, Caol Ila, Cardhu, Clynelish, Cragganmore, Dailuaine, Dalwhinnie, Dufftown, Glendullan, Glen Elgin, Glenkinchie, Glen Ord, Glen Spey, Inchgower, Knockando, Lagavulin, Linkwood, Mannochmore, Mortlach, Oban, Port Ellen, Roseisle, Royal Lochnagar, Singleton, Strathmill, Talisker, Teaninich.
  - Blended Scotch whisky: Bell's, Black & White, Buchanan's, Copper Dog, Haig, Johnnie Walker, J&B, Logan, Old Parr, Vat 69, White Horse.
- English whisky: The Oxford Artisan Distillery
- Irish whiskey: Roe & Co
- American whiskey: Bulleit, George Dickel, Seagram's Seven Crown, Balcones
- Canadian whisky: Crown Royal
- Baijiu: Shui Jing Fang
- Beer: Guinness, Guinness Black Lager, Guinness Foreign Extra Stout, Harp Lager, Hop House 13, Kilkenny, Rockshore Irish Lager, Smithwick's, Tusker
- Brandy: Cîroc VS
- Cachaça: Ypióca, Nega Fulô
- Cider: Rockshore Apple Cider
- Gin: Aviation Gin, Chase Gin, Gilbey's, Gordon's, Tanqueray
- Hard seltzer: Rockshore Hard seltzer
- Liqueur: Baileys, Pimm's, Mr. Black, Venturo
- Mixed drinks: Smirnoff Cocktails
- Rakı: Altınbaş, Civan Rakı, İzmir Rakısı, Kulüp Rakı, Tayfa Rakı, Tekirdağ Rakısı, Yeni Rakı
- Rum: Bundaberg, Captain Morgan, Zacapa, Don Papa Rum
- Tequila: 21 Seeds, Astral, Casamigos, DeLeón, Don Julio
- Vodka: Chase Vodka, Cîroc, Ketel One, Smirnoff, Bravada Vodka
- Wine: Justerini & Brooks (produced by Diageo); Dom Pérignon, Moët & Chandon, Veuve Clicquot (all produced by Moët Hennessy, a joint venture between Diageo (34%) and LVMH Moët Hennessy Louis Vuitton S.A. (66%))
- Non-alcoholic spirits: Captain Morgan Spiced Gold 0.0%, Gordon's 0.0%, Seedlip, Ritual Zero Proof, Tanqueray 0.0%

== Business ==
=== Awards ===
In June 2023, the company's subsidiary, Mortlach distillery in Moray, Scotland, was awarded the "Whisky of the Year" prize in the annual International Whisky Competition for its Gordon & MacPhail Connoisseurs Choice 1989 Mortlach single malt Scotch.

=== Sponsorships ===
In May 2025, Diageo became the Official Spirits Supporter for North, Central and South America for the 2026 FIFA World Cup.

Guinness became the official beer of the Premier League in 2024 in a four-year partnership through 2027–28.

=== Corporate responsibility ===
Diageo operates DRINKiQ, a responsible drinking website available at www.drinkiq.com providing information about alcohol consumption.

In 2017, Diageo was ranked fifth out of 4,255 companies worldwide for diversity and inclusiveness in the Thomson Reuters Diversity and Inclusion (D&I) Index.

The company's ESG action plan, Spirit of Progress, includes targets such as reaching one billion people with messages of moderation by 2030 and educating ten million young people about the dangers of underage drinking through its SMASHED partnership.

== See also ==
- List of whisky distilleries in Scotland
- Alcohol industry
- Scotch whisky
