= Grand Metropolitan =

Leisure, manufacturing and property conglomerate

Grand Metropolitan plc
- Industry: Hotels; Holiday centres Entertainment centres Public houses Casinos
- Founded: 1934
- Defunct: 1997
- Fate: Merged with Guinness
- Successor: Diageo
- Headquarters: London, England
- Key people: Sir Stanley Grinstead (chairman); Allen Sheppard, Baron Sheppard of Didgemere (CEO)
- Number of employees: 115,000

Grand Metropolitan plc was a leisure, manufacturing and property conglomerate headquartered in England. The company was listed on the London Stock Exchange and was a constituent of the FTSE 100 Index until it merged with Guinness plc to form Diageo in 1997.

== History ==
=== 1934 to 1970s ===
The business began in 1934 as a hotel business called MRMA Ltd (abbreviated from Mount Royal Metropolitan Association). Grand Hotels (Mayfair) Ltd, a business founded after World War II by Maxwell Joseph, merged with MRMA in 1957 and the combined business expanded rapidly under Joseph's leadership. It was first listed on the London Stock Exchange in 1961 and changed its name to Grand Metropolitan Hotels Ltd in 1962.

It diversified into catering acquiring Bateman Catering in 1967 and then Midland Catering in 1968. It then bought Express Dairies in 1969, the Berni Inn chain, and the Mecca bingo halls in 1970.

Next came its move into brewing, when in 1972 it bought Truman, Hanbury, Buxton & Co. and Watney Mann. The latter's subsidiary International Distillers & Vintners owned Justerini & Brooks, Baileys Irish Cream, Gilbey's gin, Piat wine and Croft sherry and port brands, as well as the European and Commonwealth rights to Smirnoff vodka. It changed its name to Grand Metropolitan in 1973.

=== 1980s onwards ===
The business failed to acquire the Coral bookmakers from Joe Coral in 1980 to expand its betting and gaming operations, but did succeed in acquiring Liggett Group, a US tobacco and drinks business. In 1981 it bought Warner Holidays and Intercontinental Hotels Corporation.

In 1986 the Company sold the Liggett Group to Bennett S. LeBow.

It acquired Heublein wines and spirits from RJR Nabisco in 1987, which made it one of the largest producers of wines and spirits in the world, and gave the company ownership of the Smirnoff brand. Also in 1987 the Company withdrew from catering when it disposed of its catering division by way of a management buyout so creating Compass Group. In February 1988 386 pubs in London, the Home Counties and East Anglia were sold to Brent Walker; 210 pubs in the north and Midlands went to Heron International and 105 pubs in the South East went to Gibbs Mew (a Wiltshire brewer subsequently bought by Enterprise Inns). Intercontinental Hotels were sold to Japan-based Saison Group.

These disposals funded the expansion of its core betting operations by buying William Hill. It also entered the fast food industry by buying the Pillsbury Company and with it the Burger King chain in 1988. It also bought the Wimpy chain that year and merged it with Burger King. It continued to sell non-core business, including in 1990 the brewers Samuel Webster's and in 1991 Ushers of Trowbridge.

=== Sales and merger into Diageo ===
In March 1991 the remaining breweries were sold to Courage (subsequently sold by Foster's to Scottish & Newcastle) in a deal that pooled 8,450 pubs as the jointly owned Inntrepreneur Estates Company. Inntrepreneur had to have 4,350 tied pubs by the time the Beer Orders took effect, which led to many being sold and fewer being let on free-of-tie leases.

In September 1993, 1,654 Chef & Brewer pubs were sold to Scottish & Newcastle, subsequently bought by Heineken. 1,750 pubs were sold in 1995 for £254M to Nomura as Phoenix Inns in one of the first securitisation deals, and in May 1996 a further 1,410 pubs were transferred to Spring Inns with a view to a similar sale. In the end Inntrepreneur and Spring were both sold to Nomura for £1.2bn in September 1997 to clear the way for the Guinness deal. This left Nomura with 4,400 pubs.

They created the Unique Pub Co for the 2,600 pubs that had signed the controversial SupplyLine agreement; the remaining 1,100 Voyager pubs were free-of-tie, earmarked for disposal or were the 400 locked in legal disputes over SupplyLine. Disposals and the acquisition of Inn Partnership (1,241 tenanted pubs) from Greenall Whitley in 1998 and 988 smaller Bass pubs in 2001. The remains of the Grand Metropolitan pub estate became part of Enterprise Inns when an Enterprise-led consortium bought 3,219 tenanted Unique pubs and 940 leased and managed Voyager pubs from Nomura in a £2bn deal in 2002.

Grand Metropolitan merged with Guinness plc in 1997 to form Diageo.
