= United Distillers =

Scottish alcohol beverage company

United Distillers was a Scottish company formed in 1987 from combining the businesses of Distillers Company and Arthur Bell & Sons, both owned by Guinness. The company owned six single malt Scotch brands, which were relaunched as the Classic Malts range. It also owned the Bernheim distillery (now owned by Heaven Hill) and the Stitzel-Weller distillery, both in Louisville, Kentucky in the United States.

In 1997 Guinness merged with Grand Metropolitan to create Diageo, and in 1998 United Distillers was merged with International Distillers & Vintners to create United Distillers & Vintners, forming the spirits division of Diageo plc.

In 2001 the company was renamed Guinness United Distillers & Vintners Scotland, and then renamed once again in 2002 to become Diageo Scotland (registered in Scotland, No. SC000750).

== See also ==
- Guinness share-trading fraud
