= Guinness Black Lager =

Black lager beer

- Type: Lager
- Manufacturer: Diageo
- Origin: Ireland
- Introduced: 2010
- Alcohol by volume: 4.5%
- Colour: Black
- Related products: Guinness Foreign Extra Stout, Schwarzbier
- Website: www.guinness.com

Guinness Black Lager is a black lager beer produced by Guinness, an Irish brewing company owned by Diageo.

The beer was tried in Northern Ireland and the United States by Diageo, and in Malaysia by Guinness Anchor Berhad, under its Guinness brand name. Test marketing began in March 2010.

== Market ==
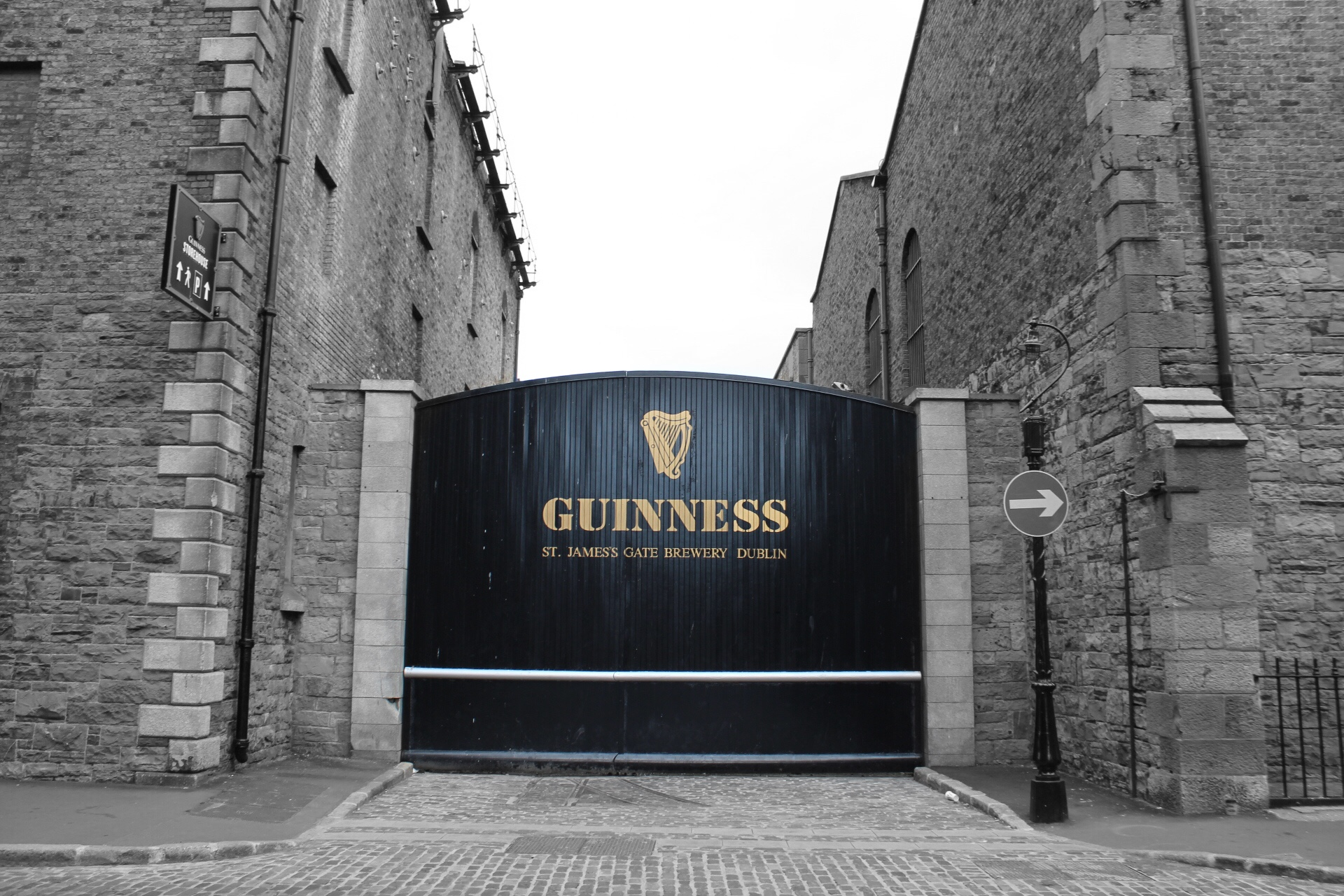
Crane Street entrance to the Guinness brewery in Dublin

The new product is aimed at young men who prefer chilled, bottled lagers to pints of beer. Guinness believes there are lager drinkers that may be interested in a dark beer but not their famous stout. It is being sold in 330 millilitre bottles for six to nine months in Northern Ireland, as a test market for Europe, and in Malaysia to see whether there are opportunities for the product elsewhere. In Malaysia, the beer will be known as Guinness Premium Beer. It will be offered at a comparable price to other premium lagers. The move follows previous attempts by Diageo to boost sales by introducing variations of Guinness stout. In 2005, the company sold Brew 39 in bars in Dublin and before that it introduced Guinness XXX Extra Strong, Guinness Gold. If the beer sells well during its trial, it will be introduced to other markets in Ireland, Europe and the U.S.

Guinness Black Lager is currently available in Australia and Canada.

In July 2012, Black Lager was launched into the Republic of Ireland market, available in packs of 4 X 330 ml bottles.

=== Marketing ===
Diageo had initially decided not to launch the new beer in the Republic of Ireland because of the massive decrease in alcohol sales in that country. Alcohol consumption has dropped two per cent from its all-time peak in 2001. The lager is being offered at selected bars and off-sales outlets in Northern Ireland. The launch will be accompanied by an advertising and marketing campaign with promotions in bars. As of February 2013, the product is still being advertised in North America.

== Composition ==
It is a 4.5% a.b.v. strength brew and gets its black colour from the roasted barley added into it.

== Other Guinness brand products ==
Guinness has made several attempts to vary its brand in the past, some of which were not successful. These include Guinness Breo and Guinness Light.
