= Guinness =

Irish brand of beer

- Type: Stout (beer)
- Manufacturer: Diageo
- Origin: Ireland
- Introduced: 1759; 267 years ago
- Alcohol by volume: 4.2%
- Colour: Black (officially described as very dark ruby-red)
- Flavour: Dry
- Variants: Guinness 0.0; Guinness Cold Brew Coffee Beer; Guinness Original; Guinness West Indies Porter
- Website: guinness.com

Guinness (/ˈɡɪnɪs/) is a stout that originated in the brewery of Arthur Guinness at St. James's Gate, Dublin, Ireland, in the 18th century. It is now owned by the British multinational alcoholic beverage maker Diageo. It is one of the most successful alcohol brands worldwide, brewed in almost 50 countries, and available in over 120. Sales in 2011 amounted to 850,000,000 litres (190,000,000 imp gal; 220,000,000 U.S. gal). It is the highest-selling beer in both Ireland and the United Kingdom.

The Guinness Storehouse is a tourist attraction at St. James's Gate Brewery in Dublin, Ireland. Since opening in 2000, it has received over 20 million visitors. Adopted in 1862 by the incumbent proprietor, Benjamin Lee Guinness, the Guinness harp motif is modelled on the Trinity College harp (which is the national symbol of Ireland), with the right-facing harp registered as a trademark for Guinness in 1876.

Guinness's flavour derives from malted barley and roasted unmalted barley. The unmalted barley is a relatively modern addition that became part of the grist in the mid-20th century. For many years, a portion of aged brew was blended with freshly brewed beer to give a sharp lactic acid flavour. Although Guinness's palate still features a characteristic "tang", the company has refused to confirm whether this type of blending still occurs. The draught beer's thick and creamy head comes from mixing the beer with nitrogen and carbon dioxide.

Guinness moved its headquarters to London at the beginning of the Anglo-Irish trade war in 1932. In 1997, Guinness plc merged with Grand Metropolitan to form the multinational alcoholic-drinks producer Diageo plc, based in London.

== History ==
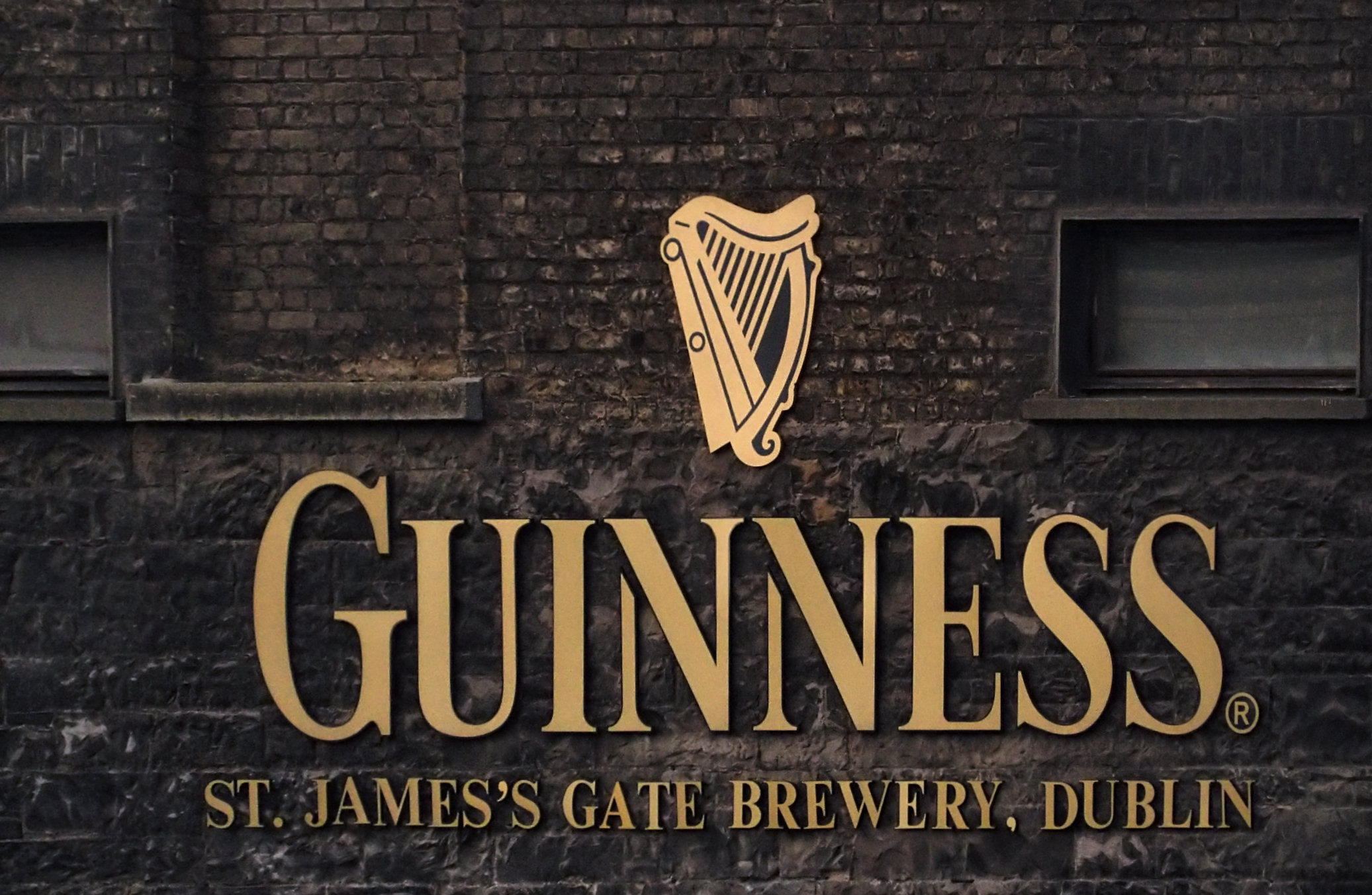
Sign at the Market Street entrance of the St. James's Gate Brewery in Dublin, Ireland

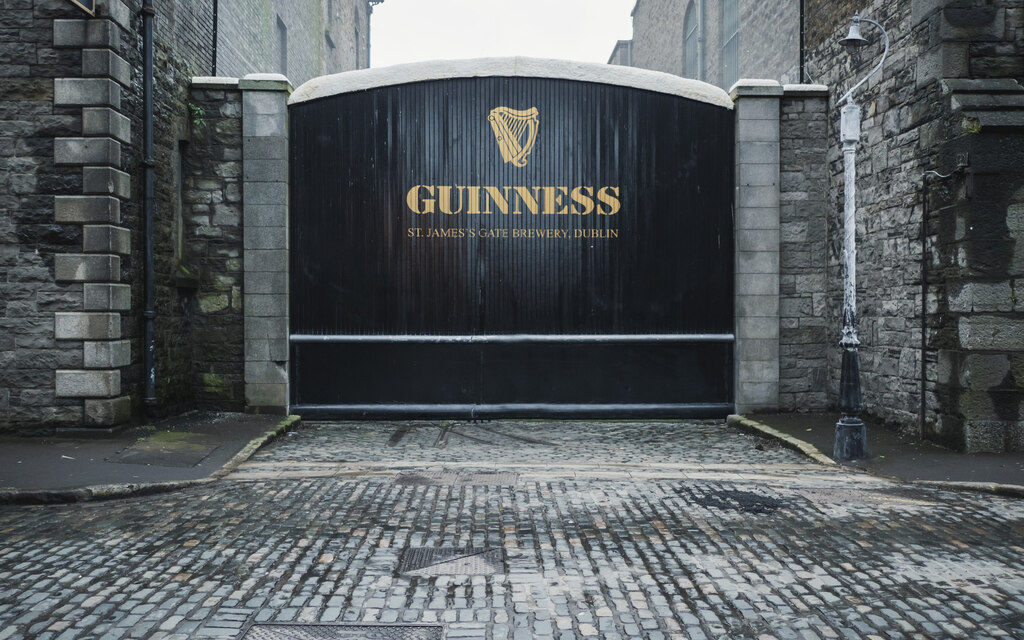
Crane Street gate

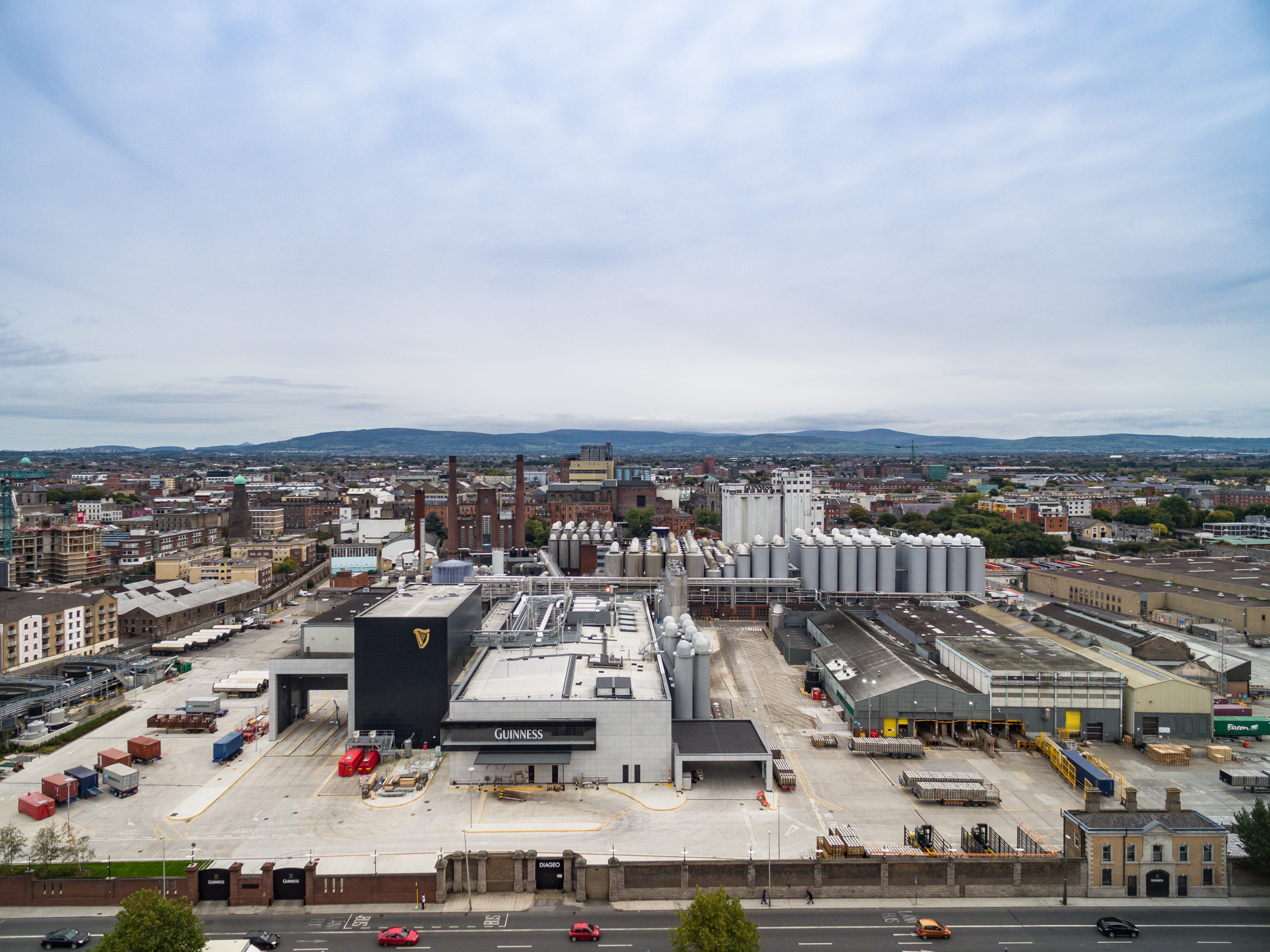
Guinness Brewery in Dublin, Ireland

Arthur Guinness started brewing ales in 1759 at the St. James's Gate Brewery, Dublin. On 31 December 1759, he signed a 9,000 year lease at £45 per annum for the unused brewery, and it would become one of the largest in the British Empire.

Arthur Guinness started selling porter in 1778. The first Guinness beers to use the term "stout" were Single Stout and Double Stout in the 1840s. Throughout the bulk of its history, Guinness produced only three variations of a single beer type: porter or stout (single, double or extra) and foreign stout for export. "Stout" originally referred to a beer's strength, but eventually shifted meaning toward body and colour. Porter was also referred to as "plain", as mentioned in the famous refrain of Flann O'Brien's poem "The Workman's Friend": "A pint of plain is your only man."

Already one of the top-three British and Irish brewers, Guinness's sales soared from 350,000 barrels in 1868 to 779,000 barrels in 1876. In October 1886, Guinness became a public company and was averaging sales of 1.138 million barrels a year. This was despite the brewery's refusal to either advertise or offer its beer at a discount. Even though Guinness owned no public houses, the company was valued at £6 million and shares were 20 times oversubscribed, with share prices rising to a 60 per cent premium on the first day of trading.

The breweries pioneered several quality control efforts. The brewery hired the statistician William Sealy Gosset in 1899, who achieved lasting fame under the pseudonym "Student" for techniques developed for Guinness, particularly Student's t-distribution and the even more commonly known Student's t-test.

By 1900 the brewery was operating unparalleled welfare schemes for its 5,000 employees. By 1907 the welfare schemes were costing the brewery £40,000 a year, which was one-fifth of the total wages bill. The improvements were suggested and supervised by Sir John Lumsden. By 1914, Guinness was producing 2.652 million barrels of beer a year, which was more than double that of its nearest competitor Bass, and was supplying more than 10 per cent of the total UK beer market.

When World War I broke out in 1914, employees at Guinness St. James Brewery were encouraged to join the British forces. Over 800 employees served in the war. This was made possible due to a number of measures put in place by Guinness: soldiers' families were paid half wages, and jobs were guaranteed upon their return. Of the 800 employees who fought, 103 did not return.

During World War II, the demand for Guinness among the British was one of the main reasons why the UK lifted commerce restrictions imposed in 1941 to force Ireland into supporting the Allied Powers.

Before 1939, if a Guinness brewer wished to marry a Catholic, his resignation was requested. According to Thomas Molloy, writing in the Irish Independent, "It had no qualms about selling drink to Catholics but it did everything it could to avoid employing them until the 1960s."

Guinness thought they brewed their last porter in 1973. In the 1970s, following declining sales, the decision was taken to make Guinness Extra Stout more "drinkable". The gravity was subsequently reduced, and the brand was relaunched in 1981. Pale malt was used for the first time, and isomerised hop extract began to be used. In 2014, two new porters were introduced: West Indies Porter and Dublin Porter.

Guinness acquired The Distillers Company in 1986. This led to a scandal and criminal trial concerning the artificial inflation of the Guinness share price during the takeover bid engineered by the chairman, Ernest Saunders. A subsequent £5.2 million success fee paid to an American lawyer and Guinness director, Tom Ward, was the subject of the case Guinness plc v Saunders, in which the House of Lords declared that the payment had been invalid.

In the 1980s, as the IRA's bombing campaign spread to London and the rest of Britain, Guinness considered scrapping the harp as its logo.

In 1997 the company merged with Grand Metropolitan to form Diageo. The company was maintained as a separate entity within Diageo and has retained the rights to the product and all associated trademarks of Guinness.

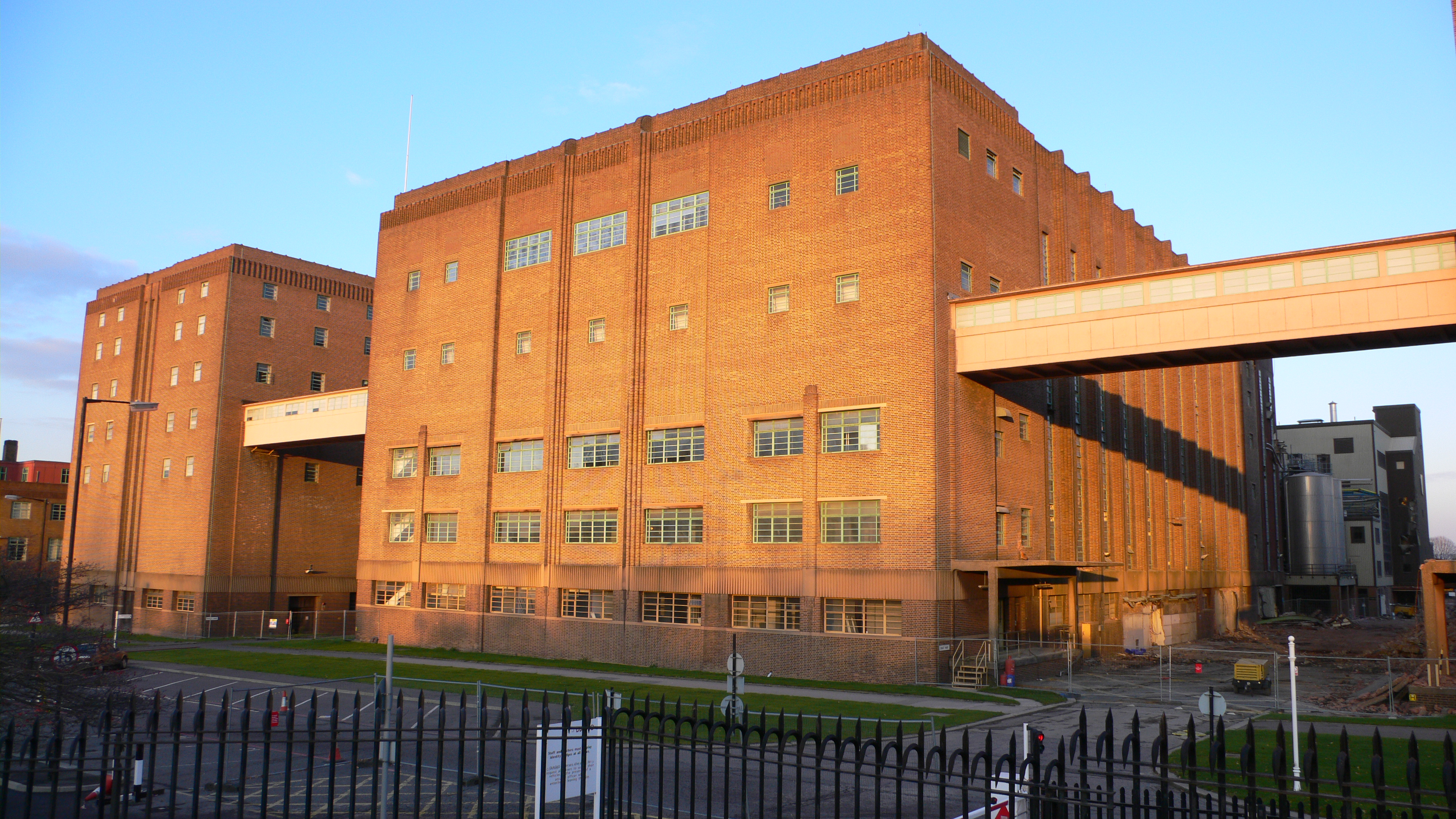
The Guinness Brewery Park Royal during demolition, at its peak the largest and most productive brewery in the world

The Guinness brewery in Park Royal London, closed in 2005. The production of all Guinness sold in the UK and Ireland was moved to St. James's Gate Brewery, Dublin.

House flag of the Guinness shipping fleet, which ceased operating in 1993

Guinness had a fleet of ships, barges and yachts.

The Irish Sunday Independent newspaper reported on 17 June 2007 that Diageo intended to close the historic St. James's Gate plant in Dublin and move to a greenfield site on the outskirts of the city. Initially, Diageo dismissed talk of a move as a rumour, but as speculation mounted in the wake of the Sunday Independent article, the company confirmed it was undertaking a "significant review of its operations". This review was part of the company's ongoing drive to reduce the environmental impact of brewing at the St. James's Gate plant.

On 23 November 2007, an article appeared in the Evening Herald, a Dublin newspaper, stating that the Dublin City Council, in the best interests of the city of Dublin, had put forward a motion to prevent planning permission ever being granted for the development of the site, thus making it very difficult for Diageo to sell off the site for residential development. On 9 May 2008, Diageo announced that the St. James's Gate brewery will remain open and undergo renovations, but that breweries in Kilkenny and Dundalk will be closed by 2013 when a new larger brewery is opened near Dublin. The result will be a loss of roughly 250 jobs across the entire Diageo and Guinness workforce in Ireland. Two days later, the Sunday Independent again reported that Diageo chiefs had met with Tánaiste Mary Coughlan, the deputy leader of the Government of Ireland, about moving operations to Ireland from the UK to benefit from its lower corporation tax rates. Several UK firms have made the move in order to pay Ireland's 12.5 per cent rate rather than the UK's 28 per cent rate. Diageo released a statement to the London Stock Exchange (LSE) denying the report.

In 2017, Diageo made their beer suitable for consumption by vegetarians and vegans by introducing a new filtration process that avoided the use of isinglass, derived from fish bladders, to filter out yeast particles.

== Composition ==
Guinness stout is made from water, malted barley, roasted barley, hops, and brewer's yeast. A portion of the barley is roasted to give Guinness its dark colour and characteristic taste. It is pasteurised and filtered.

Until the late 1950s, Guinness was still racked into wooden casks. In the late 1950s and early 1960s, Guinness ceased brewing cask-conditioned beers and developed a keg brewing system with aluminium kegs replacing the wooden casks; these were nicknamed "iron lungs". Until 2016 the production of Guinness, as with many beers, involved the use of isinglass made from fish. Isinglass was used as a fining agent for settling out suspended matter in the vat. The isinglass was retained in the floor of the vat but it was possible that minute quantities might be carried over into the beer. Diageo announced in February 2018 that the use of isinglass in draught Guinness was to be discontinued and an alternative clarification agent would be used instead, making the drink acceptable to vegans and vegetarians.

== Present day Guinness ==
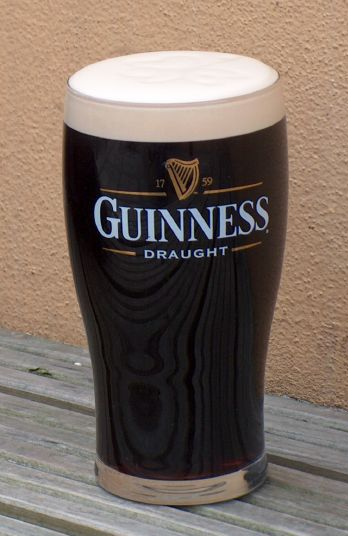
A pint of Guinness

Arguably its biggest change to date, in 1959 Guinness began using nitrogen, which changed the fundamental texture and flavour of the Guinness of the past as nitrogen bubbles are much smaller than CO_{2}, giving a "creamier" and "smoother" consistency over a sharper and traditional CO_{2} taste. This step was taken after Michael Ash—a mathematician turned brewer—discovered the mechanism to make this possible.

Nitrogen is less soluble than carbon dioxide, which allows the beer to be put under high pressure without making it fizzy. High pressure of the dissolved gas is required to enable very small bubbles to be formed by forcing the draught beer through fine holes in a plate in the tap, which causes the characteristic "surge" (the widget in cans and bottles achieves the same effect). This "widget" is a small plastic ball containing the nitrogen. The perceived smoothness of draught Guinness is due to its low level of carbon dioxide and the creaminess of the head caused by the very fine bubbles that arise from the use of nitrogen and the dispensing method described above. Foreign Extra Stout contains more carbon dioxide, causing a more acidic taste.

Although Guinness is black, and is referred to as "the black stuff" in Diageo marketing, it is also "officially" referred to as a very dark shade of ruby.

The most recent change in alcohol content from the Import Stout to the Extra Stout was due to a change in distribution through North American market. Consumer complaints influenced subsequent distribution and bottle changes.

== Health ==
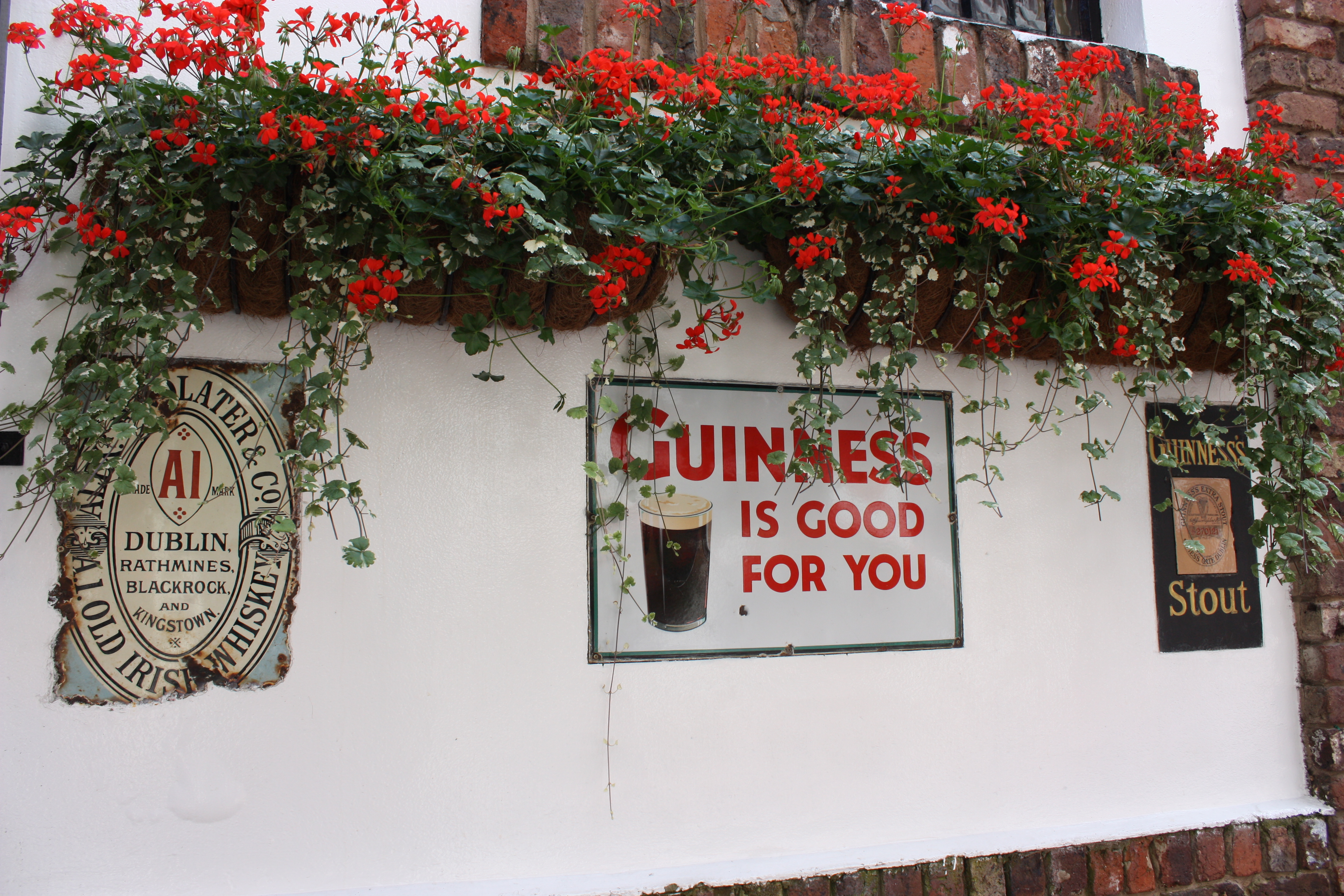
A Guinness advertisement states "Guinness is good for you".

Guinness ran an advertising campaign in the 1920s which stemmed from market research – when people told the company that they felt good after their pint – the slogan, created by Dorothy L. Sayers, "Guinness is Good for You". Advertising for alcoholic drinks that implies improved physical performance or enhanced personal qualities is now prohibited in Ireland.

A 2003 study found that stouts such as Guinness could have a benefit of helping to reduce the deposit of harmful cholesterol on artery walls. This was attributed to the higher levels of antioxidants in stouts than in lagers, though the health benefits of antioxidants have been called into question, and Diageo, the company that now manufactures Guinness, said: "We never make any medical claims for our drinks."

== Varieties ==
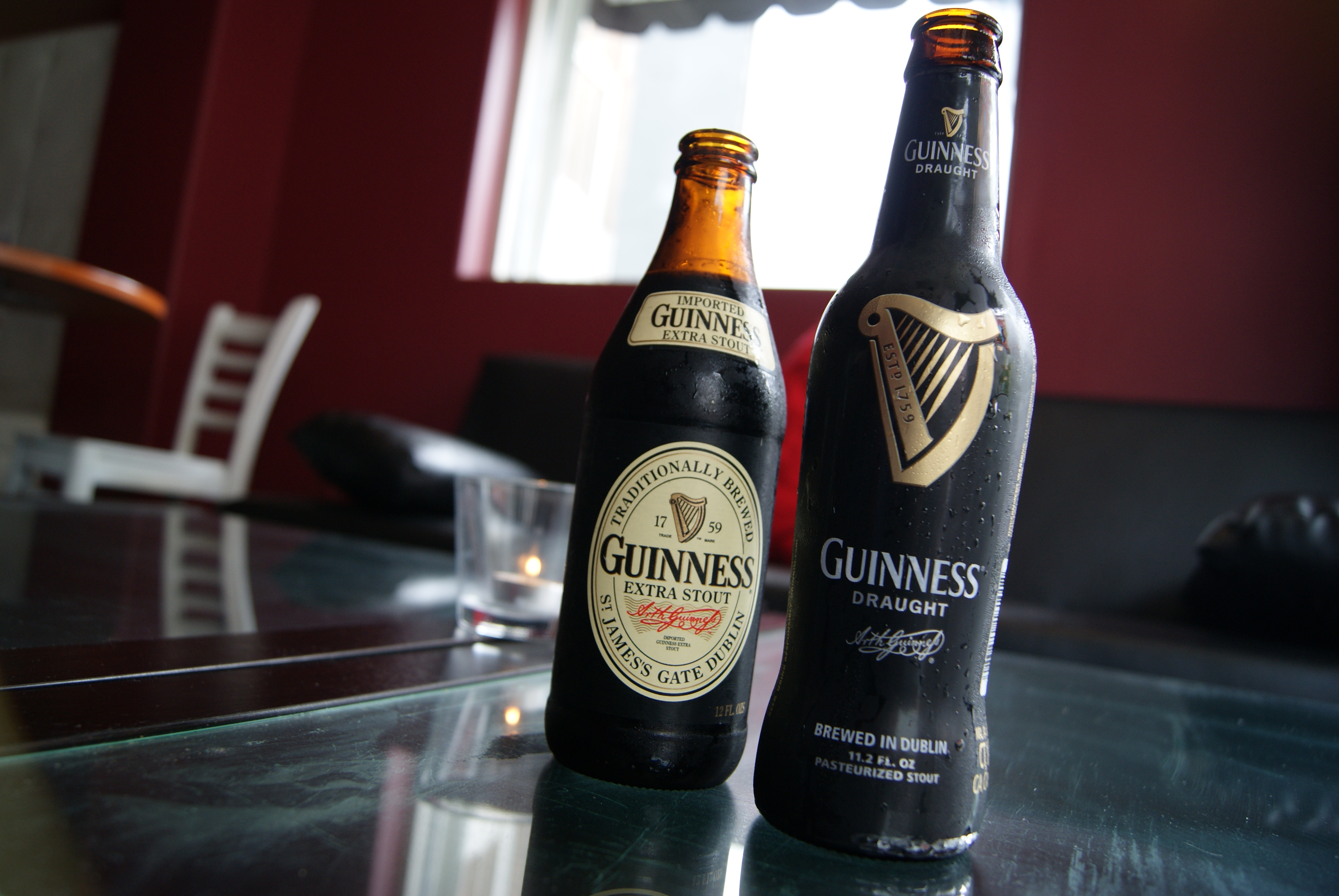
Guinness Extra Stout and Guinness Draught

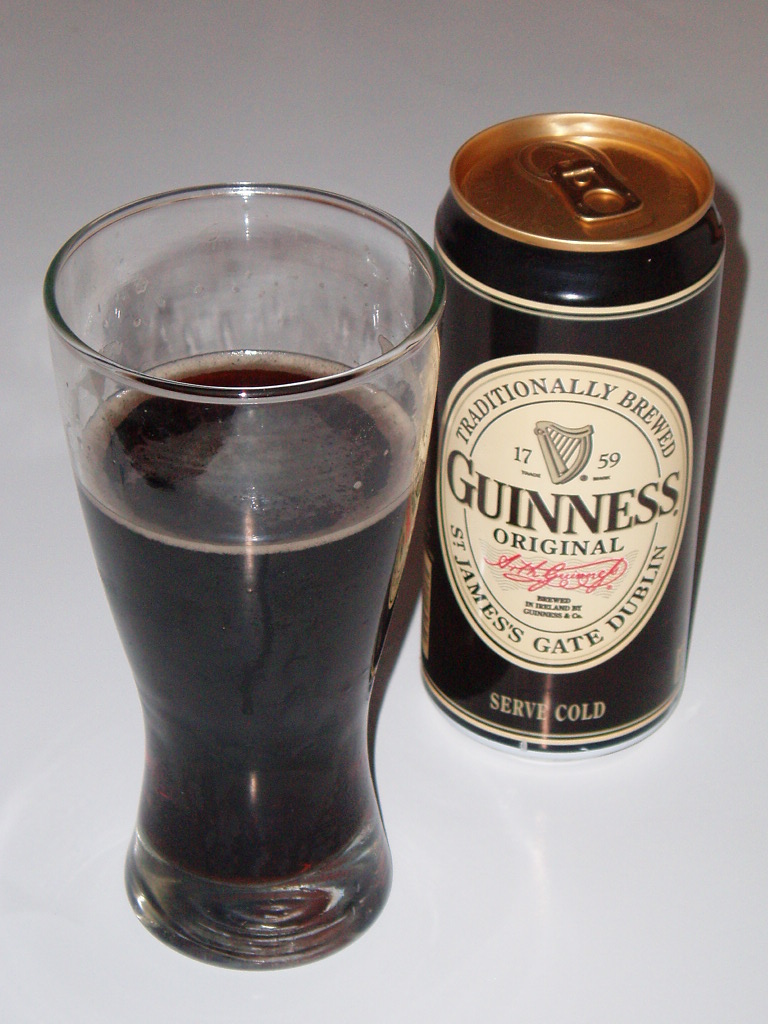
Guinness Original/Extra Stout Can

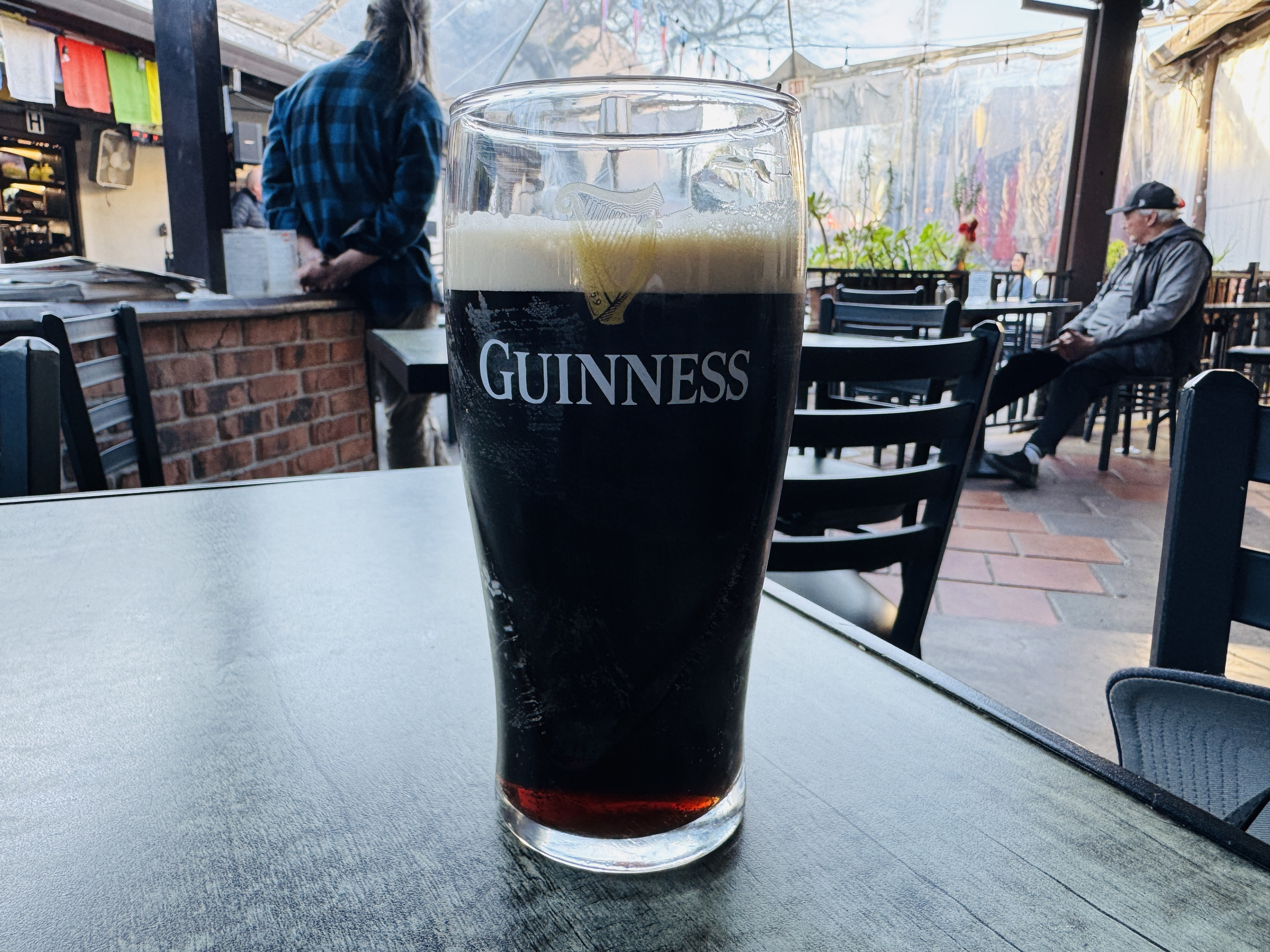
A pint glass partially filled with Guinness 0 poured from a can.

Guinness stout is available in a number of variants and strengths, which include:

- Guinness Draught, the standard draught beer sold in kegs (but exist also a texture-like version in widget cans and bottles): 4.1 to 4.3% alcohol by volume (ABV); the Extra Cold is served through a super cooler at 3.5 °C (38.3 °F).
- Guinness Original/Extra Stout: 4.2 or 4.3% ABV in Ireland and the United Kingdom, 4.1% in Germany, 5.0% in continental Europe and Scandinavia (such as Sweden), 4.8% in Namibia and South Africa, 5.6% in the United States and Canada, and 6% in Australia and Japan.
- Guinness Foreign Extra Stout: 7.5% ABV version sold in Europe, Africa, the Caribbean, Asia, and the United States. The basis is an unfermented but hopped Guinness wort extract shipped from Dublin, which is added to local ingredients and fermented locally. The strength can vary, for example, it is sold at 5% ABV in China, 6.5% ABV in Jamaica and East Africa, 6.8% in Malaysia, 7.5% in the United States, and 8% ABV in Singapore. In Nigeria a proportion of sorghum is used. Foreign Extra Stout is blended with a small amount of intentionally soured beer. Formerly, it was blended with beer that soured naturally as a result of fermenting in ancient oak tuns with a Brettanomyces population; it is now made with pasteurised beer that has been soured bacterially. It was previously known as West Indies Porter, then Extra Stout and finally Foreign Extra Stout. It was first made available in the UK in 1990.
- Guinness Special Export Stout, Commissioned by John Martin of Belgium in 1912. The first variety of Guinness to be pasteurised, in 1930. 8% ABV.
- Guinness Bitter, an English-style bitter beer: 4.4% ABV.
- Guinness Extra Smooth, a smoother stout sold in Ghana, Cameroon and Nigeria: 5.5% ABV.
- Malta Guinness, a non-alcoholic beverage, produced in Nigeria and exported to the UK, East Africa, and Malaysia.
- Guinness Zero ABV, a non-alcoholic beverage sold in Indonesia.
- Guinness Mid-Strength, a low-alcohol stout test-marketed in Limerick, Ireland in March 2006 and Dublin from May 2007: 2.8% ABV.
- Guinness Red, brewed in exactly the same way as Guinness except that the barley is only lightly roasted so that it produces a lighter, slightly fruitier red ale; test-marketed in Britain in February 2007: 4% ABV.
- 250 Anniversary Stout, released in the U.S., Australia and Singapore on 24 April 2009; 5% ABV.
- Guinness West Indies, a Porter which imitates the 1801 variety with notes of toffee and chocolate: 6% ABV.

In October 2005, Guinness announced the Brewhouse Series, a limited-edition collection of draught stouts available for roughly six months each. There were three beers in the series.

- Brew 39 was sold in Dublin from late 2005 until early 2006. It had the same alcohol content (ABV) as Guinness Draught, used the same gas mix and settled in the same way, but had a slightly different taste. Many found it to be lighter in taste, somewhat closer to Beamish stout than standard Irish Guinness. The Beamish & Crawford Brewery was established in 1792 in the City of Cork, and was bought by Guinness in 1833.
- Toucan Brew was introduced in May 2006. It was named after the cartoon toucan used in many Guinness advertisements. This beer had a crisper taste with a slightly sweet aftertaste due to its triple-hopped brewing process.
- North Star was introduced in October 2006 and sold into late 2007. Three million pints of North Star were sold in the latter half of 2007.

Despite an announcement in June 2007 that the fourth Brewhouse stout would be launched in October that year, no new beer appeared and, at the end of 2007, the Brewhouse series appeared to have been quietly cancelled.

From early 2006, Guinness marketed a "surger" unit in Britain. This surger device, marketed for use with cans consumed at home, was "said to activate the gases in the canned beer" by sending an "ultra-sonic pulse through the pint glass" sitting upon the device.

Withdrawn Guinness variants include Guinness's Brite Lager, Guinness's Brite Ale, Guinness Light, Guinness XXX Extra Strong Stout, Guinness Cream Stout, Guinness Milk Stout, Guinness Irish Wheat, Guinness Gold, Guinness Pilsner, Guinness Breó (a slightly citrusy wheat beer), Guinness Shandy, and Guinness Special Light.

Breó (meaning 'glow' in Irish) was a wheat beer; it cost around IR£5 million to develop.

A brewing byproduct of Guinness, Guinness Yeast Extract (GYE), was produced until the 1950s. In the UK, a HP Guinness Sauce was manufactured by Heinz and available as of 2013.

In March 2010, Guinness began test marketing Guinness Black Lager, a new black lager, in Northern Ireland and Malaysia. As of September 2010, Guinness Black Lager is no longer readily available in Malaysia. In October 2010, Guinness began selling Foreign Extra Stout in 4 packs of bottles in the United States.

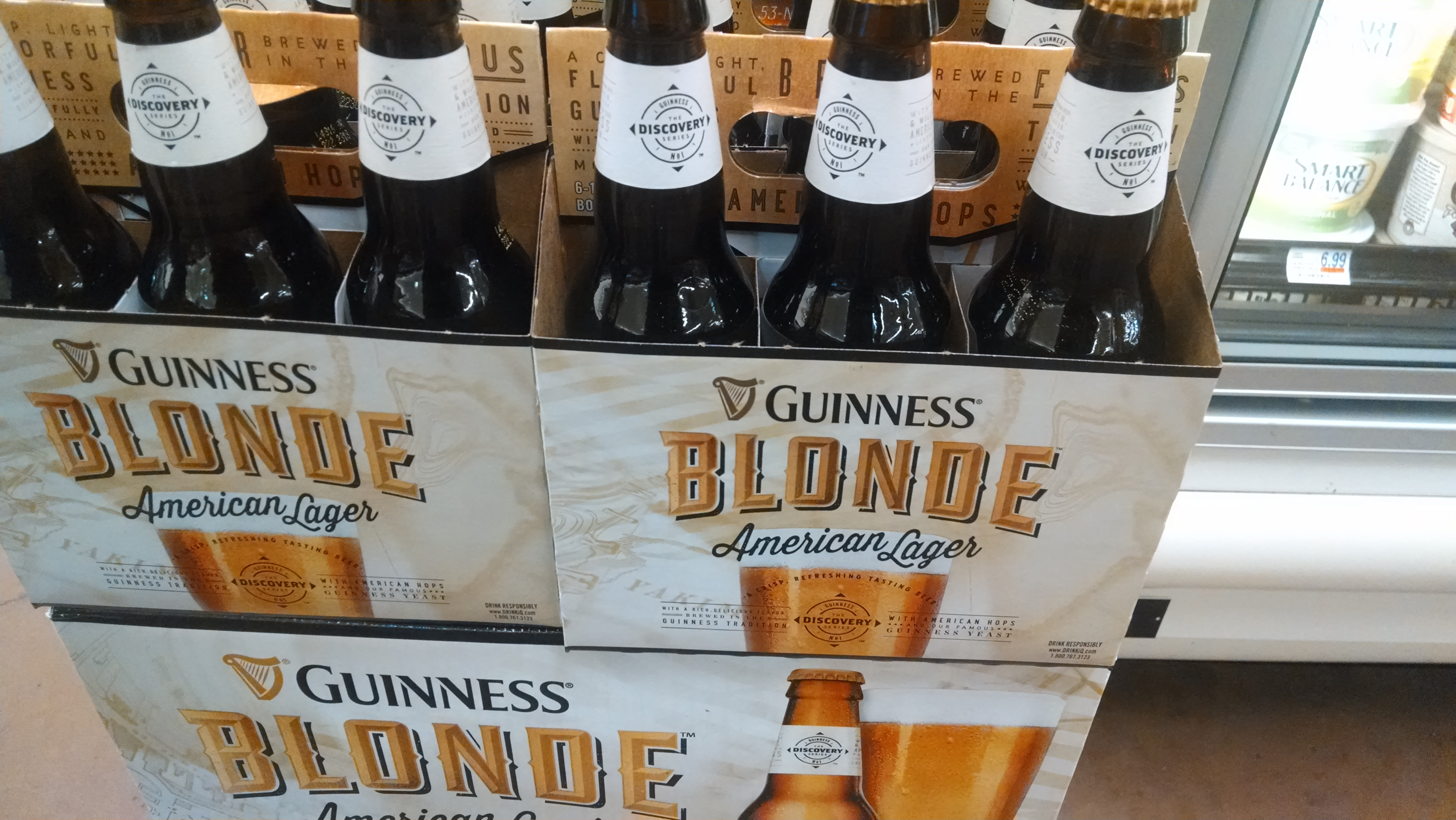
Guinness Blonde American Lager

In 2014, Guinness released Guinness Blonde, a lager brewed in Latrobe, Pennsylvania using a combination of Guinness yeast and American ingredients. When Guinness opened their new brewery in Baltimore, Maryland in August 2018 they recreated "Blonde" to "Baltimore Blonde" by adjusting the grain mixture and adding Citra for a citrus flavour and removed the Mosaic hops.

Guinness released a lager in 2015 called Hop House 13. It was withdrawn from sale in the UK in May 2021, following poor sales, but remains on sale in Ireland.

In 2020, Guinness announced the introduction of a zero alcohol canned stout, Guinness 0.0. It was withdrawn from sale almost immediately after launch, due to contamination. It was relaunched in 2021 starting with pubs in mid July with cans following in late August.

In September 2021, Guinness Nitrosurge was released in pint sized cans which contain no widget. Similar to the Surger, nitrogen is activated using ultrasonic frequencies. Nitrosurge uses a special device attached to the top of the can which activates the nitrogen as it is being poured.

== Pouring and serving ==
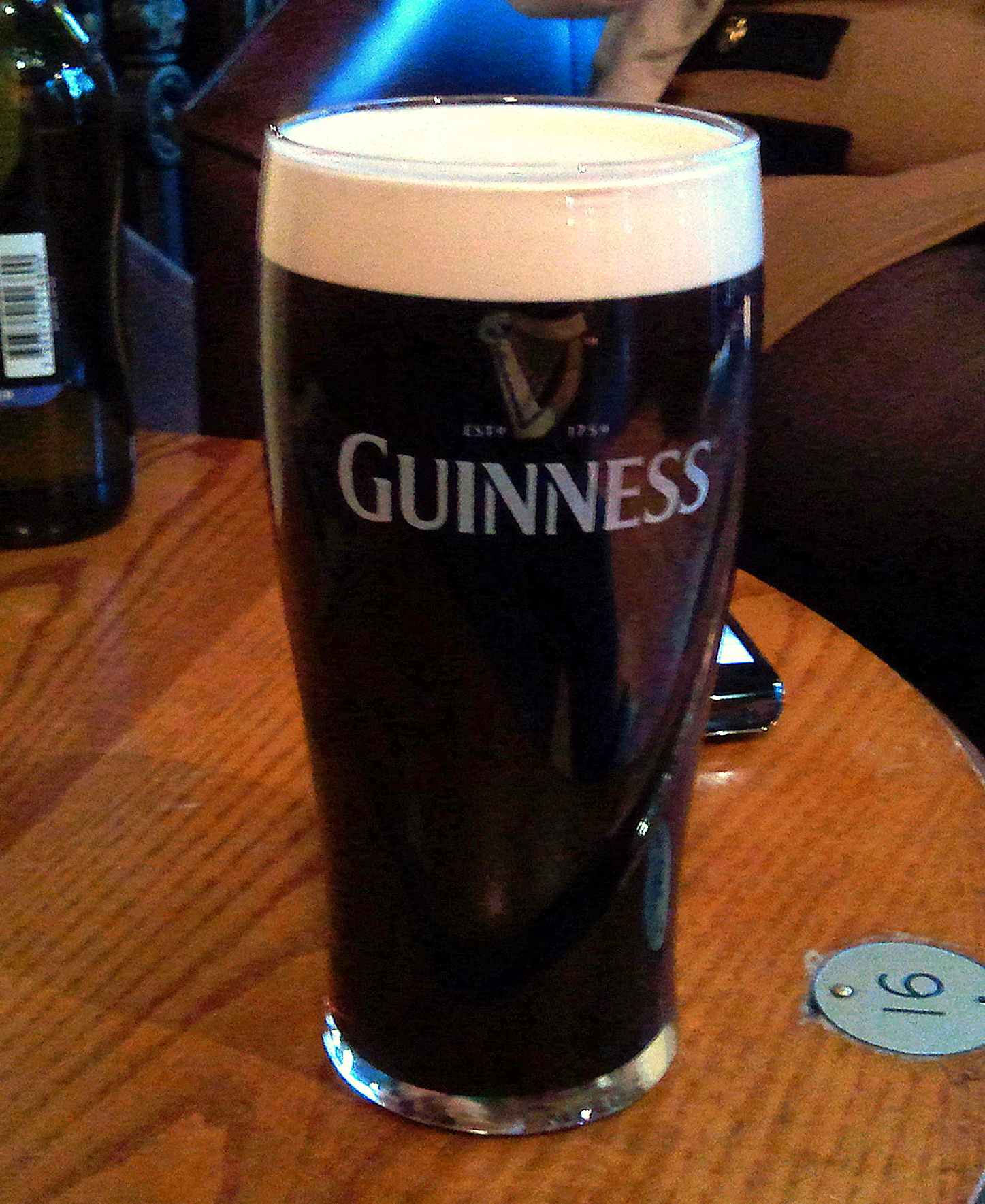
An example of the Guinness pint glass released in 2010

Before the 1960s, when Guinness adopted a system of delivery using a nitrogen and carbon dioxide gas mixture, all beer leaving the brewery was cask-conditioned. Casks newly delivered to many small pubs were often nearly unmanageably frothy, but cellar space and rapid turnover demanded that they be put into use before they could sit for long enough to settle down. As a result, a glass would be part filled with the fresh, frothy beer, allowed to stand a minute, and then topped up with beer from a cask that had been pouring longer and had calmed down a bit. With the move to nitrogen gas dispensing in the 1960s, it was felt important to keep the two-stage pour ritual in order to bring better consumer acceptance of the change. As Guinness has not been cask-conditioned for decades, the two-stage pour has been labelled a marketing ploy that does not actually affect the beer's taste.

Guinness pour and serve

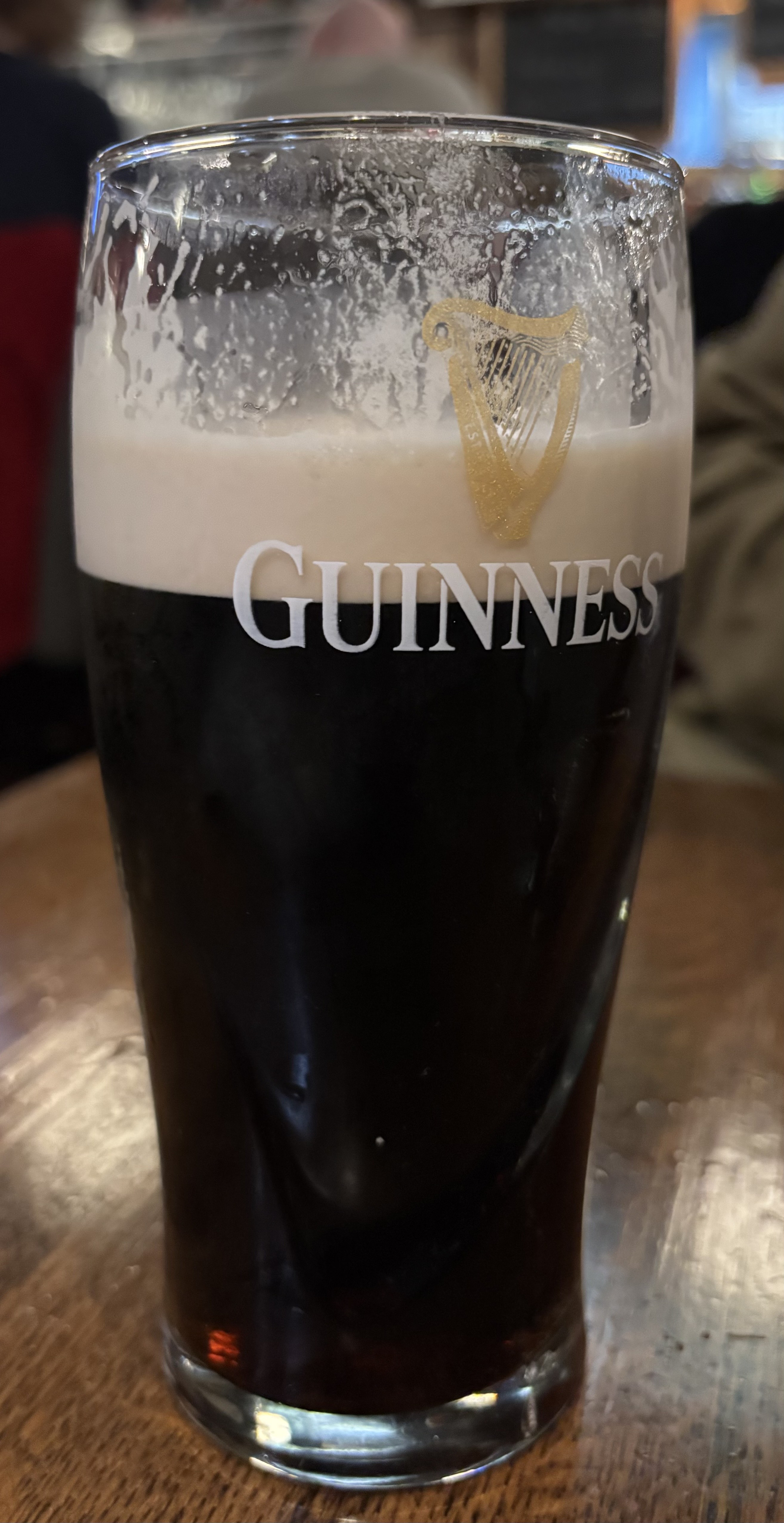
An example of "splitting the G"

The manufacturer recommends a "double pour" serve, which according to Diageo should take two minutes. Guinness has promoted this wait with advertising campaigns such as "good things come to those who wait".

The brewer recommends that draught Guinness should be served at 6–7 °C (42.8 °F), while Extra Cold Guinness should be served at 3.5 °C (38.6 °F). Before the 21st century, it was popular to serve Guinness at cellar temperature (about 13 °C) and most drinkers preferred it at room temperature (about 20 °C).

According to Esquire magazine, a pint of Guinness should be served in a slightly tulip-shaped pint glass, rather than the taller European tulip or 'Nonic' glass, which contains a ridge approx 3/4 of the way up the glass. To begin the pour, the server holds the glass at a 45° angle below the tap and fills the glass 3/4 full. On the way out of the tap, the beer is forced at high speed through a five-hole disc restrictor plate at the end of the tap, creating friction and forcing the creation of small nitrogen bubbles which form a creamy head. The server brings the glass from 45° angle to a vertical position. After allowing the initial pour to settle, the server pushes the tap handle back and fills the remainder of the glass until the head forms a slight dome over the top of the glass (or "just proud of the rim"). Guinness recommends that, to avoid the bitter taste of the nitrogen foam head, gulps should be taken from the glass rather than sipping the drink.

In 2010, Guinness redesigned their pint glass for the first time in a decade. The new glass was taller and narrower than the previous one and featured a bevel design. The new glasses were planned to gradually replace the old ones.

A practice known as "splitting the G" has been an entry on the Urban Dictionary website since 2018. This drinking game sees the drinker attempt to bring the liquid level of the Guinness to sit at a certain level in relation to the glass' Guinness branding. Variants of the practice see the required liquid level as either: between the letter 'G', on the horizontal line of the 'G', or between the 'G' and the harp logo.

== Sinking bubbles ==
When Guinness is poured, the gas bubbles appear to travel downwards in the glass. The effect is attributed to drag; bubbles that touch the walls of a glass are slowed in their travel upwards. Bubbles in the centre of the glass are, however, free to rise to the surface, and thus form a rising column of bubbles. The rising bubbles create a current by the entrainment of the surrounding fluid. As beer rises in the centre, the beer near the outside of the glass falls. This downward flow pushes the bubbles near the glass towards the bottom. Although the effect occurs in any liquid, it is particularly noticeable in any dark nitrogen stout, as the drink combines dark-coloured liquid and light-coloured bubbles.

A study published in 2012 revealed that the effect is due to the particular shape of the glass coupled with the small bubble size found in stout beers. If the vessel widens with height, then bubbles will sink along the walls – this is the case for the standard pint glass. Conversely, in an anti-pint (i.e. if the vessel narrows with height) bubbles will rise along the walls.

== Advertising ==
The Guinness harp motif is modelled on the Trinity College harp. It was adopted in 1862 by the incumbent proprietor, Benjamin Lee Guinness. Harps have been a symbol of Ireland at least since the reign of Henry VIII. Guinness registered their harp as a trademark shortly after the passing of the Trade Marks Registration Act 1875. It faces right instead of left, and so can be distinguished from the Irish coat of arms.

Since the 1930s, in the face of falling sales, Guinness has had prominent marketing campaigns, from television advertisements to beer mats and posters. Before then, Guinness had almost no advertising, instead allowing word of mouth to sell the product.

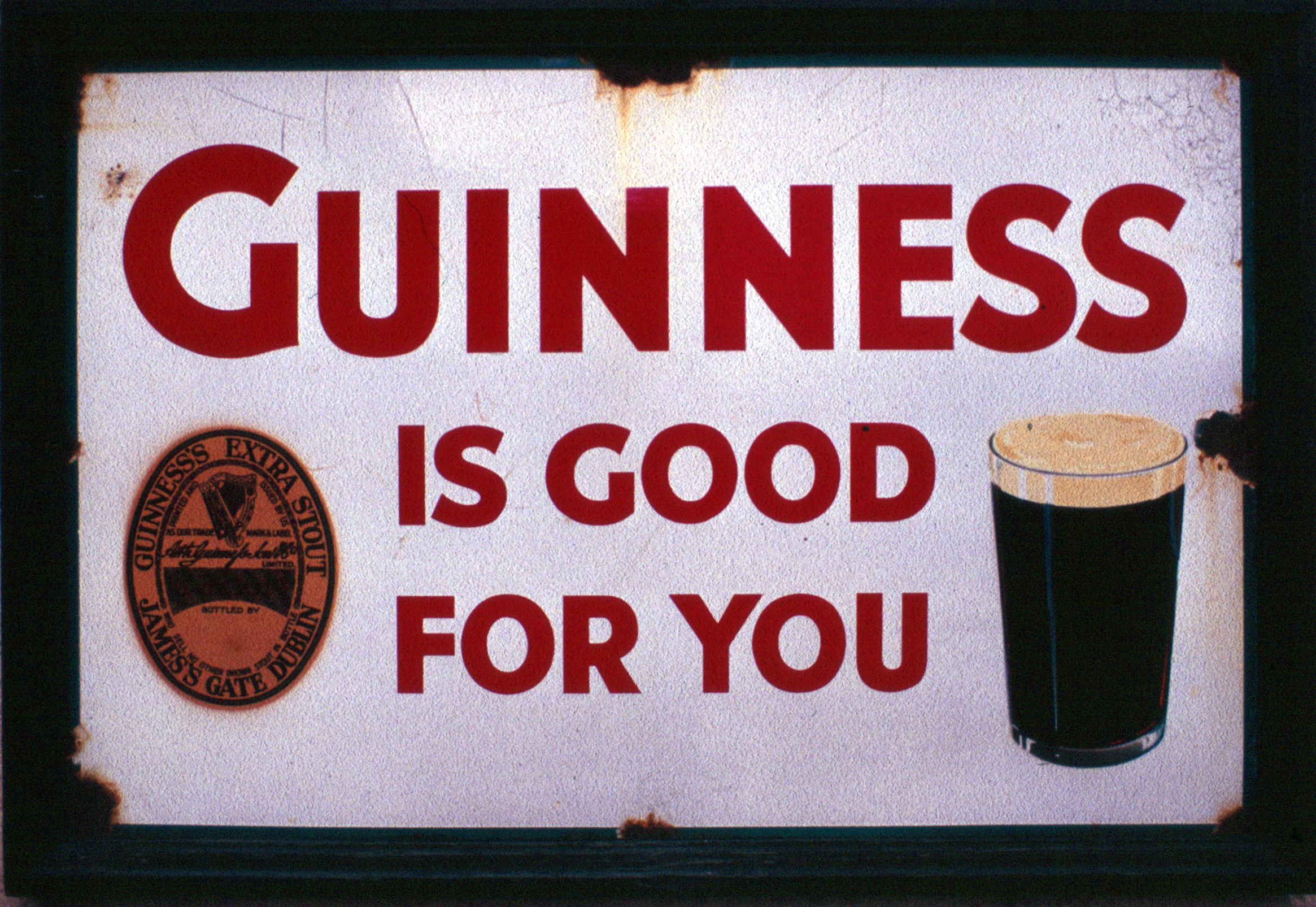
Guinness slogan from the 1920s to the 1960s

The most notable and recognisable series of advertisements was created by S. H. Benson's advertising, primarily drawn by the artist John Gilroy, in the 1930s and 1940s. Benson created posters that included phrases such as "Guinness for Strength", "Lovely Day for a Guinness", "Guinness Makes You Strong", "My Goodness My Guinness" (or, alternatively, "My Goodness, My Christmas, It's Guinness!"), and most famously, "Guinness Is Good for You". While modern alcohol advertising regulations prohibit such claims, vintage artefacts with the slogans remain common in Irish pubs.

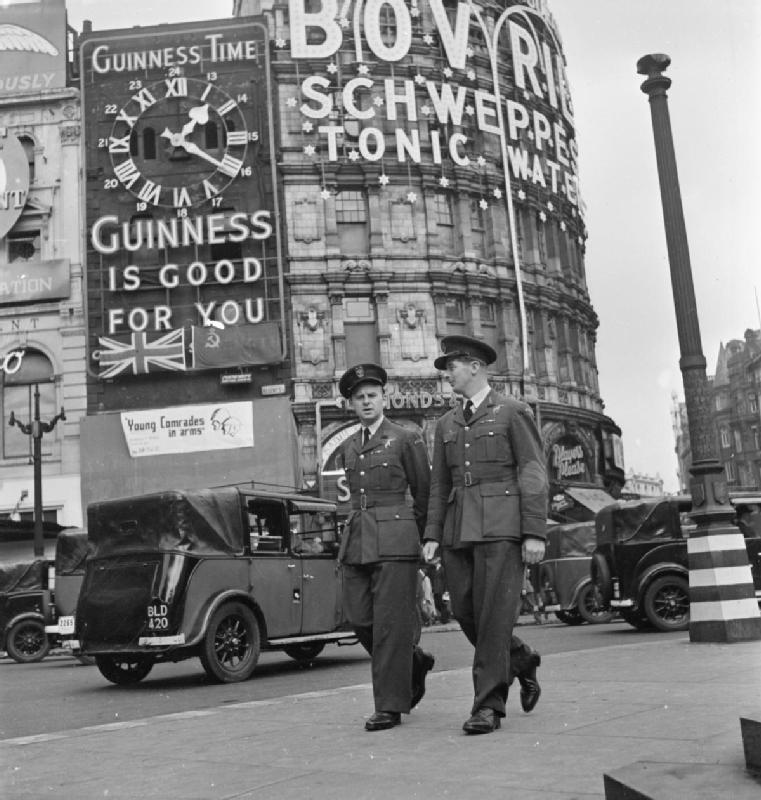
Guinness slogan in 1942, Piccadilly Circus, London. The neon sign was in place from the 1930s until the early 1980s.

The posters featured Gilroy's distinctive artwork and more often than not featured animals such as a kangaroo, ostrich, seal, lion and notably a toucan, which has become as much a symbol of Guinness as the harp. (An advertisement from the 1940s ran with the following jingle: "Toucans in their nests agree/Guinness is good for you/Try some today and see/What one or toucan do.") Dorothy L. Sayers and R. A. Bevan copywriters at Benson's also worked on the campaign; a biography of Sayers notes that she created a sketch of the toucan and wrote several of the adverts in question. Guinness advertising paraphernalia, notably the pastiche booklets illustrated by Ronald Ferns, attract high prices on the collectable market.

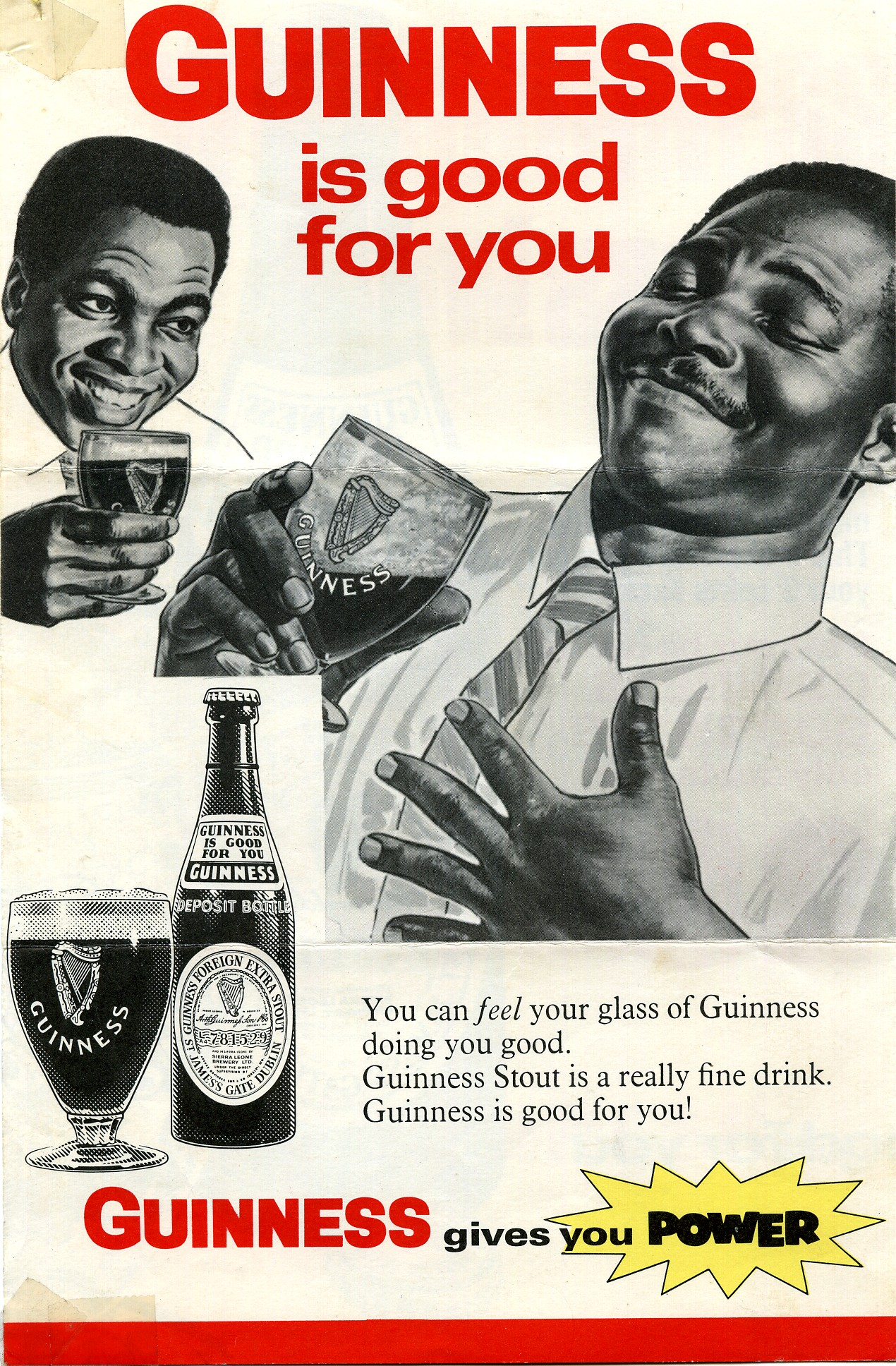
Advertisement in Sierra Leone, 1968 after the company established a brewery in West Africa

Many of the best known Guinness television advertisements of the 1970s and 1980s were created by British director, Len Fulford. In 1983, a conscious marketing decision was made to turn Guinness into a "cult" beer in the UK, amidst declining sales. The move halted the sales decline.

The Guardian described the management of the brand: "They've spent years now building a brand that's in complete opposition to cheap lagers, session drinking and crowds of young men boozing in bars. They've worked very hard to help Guinness drinkers picture themselves as twinkly-eyed, Byronic bar-room intellectuals, sitting quietly with a pint and dreaming of poetry and impossibly lovely redheads running barefoot across the peat. You have a pint or two of Guinness with a slim volume of Yeats, not eight mates and a 19-pint bender which ends in tattoos, A&E [the ED] and herpes from a hen party."

In the late 1980s and early 1990s, in the UK, there was a series of "darkly" humorous adverts, featuring actor Rutger Hauer, with the theme "Pure Genius", extolling its qualities in brewing and target market.

The 1994–1995 Anticipation TV ad, featuring actor Joe McKinney dancing to "Guaglione" by Pérez Prado while his pint settled, led to the song being re-released and becoming a number one hit in Ireland and reaching number two in the UK. The length of time it takes to pour a proper pint of stout was also the focus of the "Good things come to those who wait" campaign in the UK in the later 1990s.

From 1999 to 2006, the Michael Power advertising character was the cornerstone of a major marketing campaign to promote Guinness products in Africa. The character, played by Cleveland Mitchell, was portrayed to have been born in Jamaica and raised in Great Britain. By 2003, it became one of the best-known alcohol advertising campaigns in Africa. Jo Foster of the BBC referred to Power as "Africa's very own 'James Bond'".

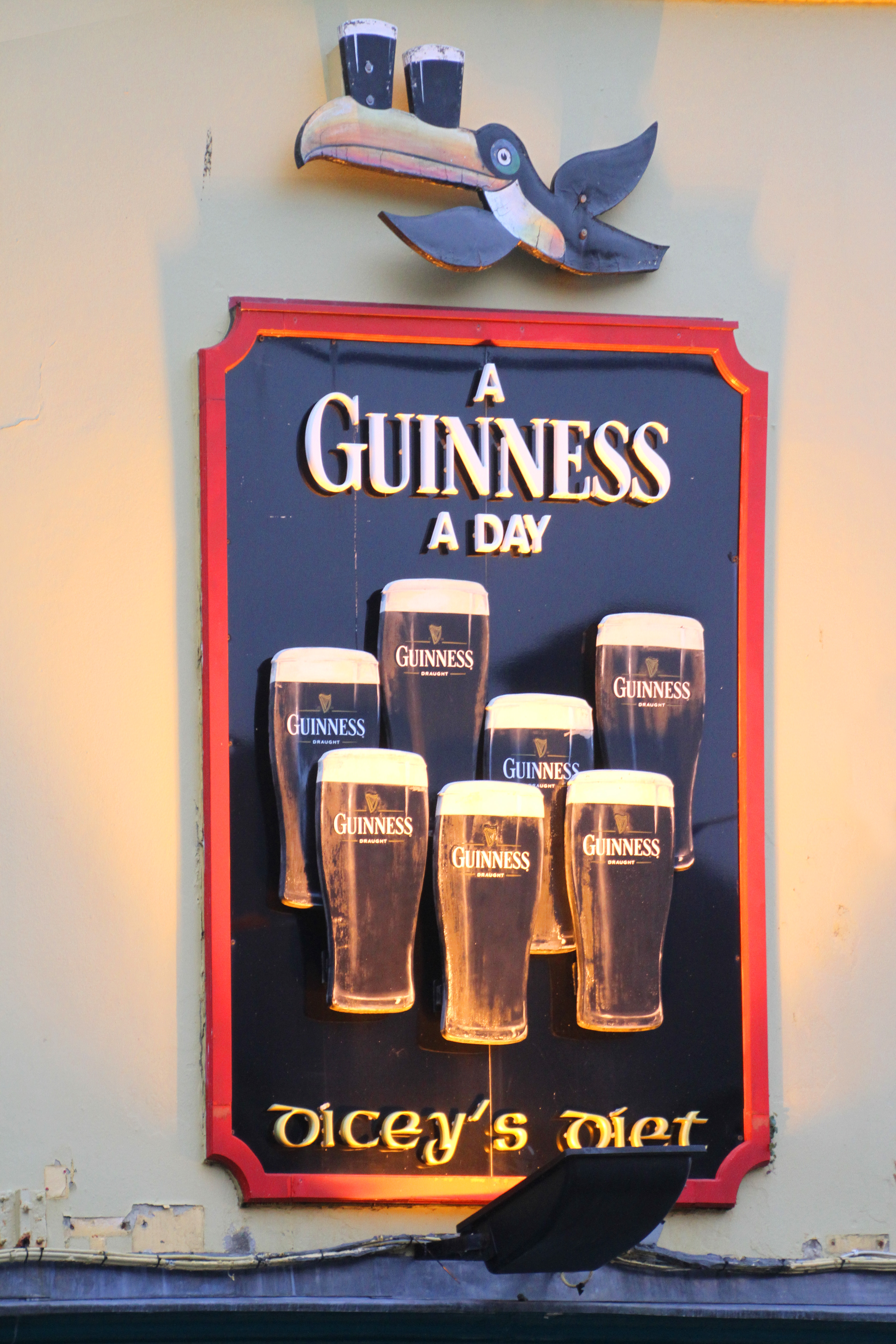
Advertisement in Ballyshannon, County Donegal, Ireland

In 2000, Guinness's 1999 advertisement Surfer was named the best television commercial of all time, in a UK poll conducted by The Sunday Times and Channel 4. This advertisement is inspired by the famous 1980s Guinness TV and cinema ad, Big Wave, centred on a surfer riding a wave while a bikini-clad sunbather takes photographs. The 1980s advertisement not only remained a popular iconic image in its own right; it also entered the Irish cultural memory through inspiring a well-known line in Christy Moore's song "Delirium Tremens" (1985). Surfer was produced by the advertising agency Abbott Mead Vickers BBDO; the advertisement can be downloaded from their website.

Guinness won the 2001 Clio Award as the Advertiser of the Year, citing the work of five separate ad agencies around the world.

In 2002, Guinness applied the Michael Power formula to Asia with the character Adam King. The campaign featured such tag lines as: "Everyday someone, somewhere achieves something new. Sometimes on a grand, dramatic scale. Sometimes on a more personal scale." As of 2004, Guinness ranked among the top three beer labels in Singapore and Malaysia, with a 20 per cent market share across Southeast Asia. Malaysia was the brand's third-largest market in the region and the sixth largest market worldwide.

In 2003, the Guinness TV campaign featuring Tom Crean won the gold Shark Award at the International Advertising Festival of Ireland, while in 2005 their Irish Christmas campaign won a silver Shark. This TV ad has been run every Christmas since its debut in December 2004 and features pictures of snow falling in places around Ireland finishing at St. James's Gate Brewery with the line: "Even at the home of the black stuff they dream of a white one".

The UK commercial "noitulovE", first broadcast in October 2005, was one of the most-awarded commercials worldwide in 2006. In 2006, Diageo, owner of the Guinness brand, replaced the Michael Power campaign with the "Guinness Greatness" campaign, which they claim emphasises the "drop of greatness" in everyone, in contrast to the high-tension heroics of the Power character.

Guinness's 2007 advertisement, directed by Nicolai Fuglsig and filmed in Argentina, is entitled "Tipping Point". It involves a large-scale domino chain reaction and, with a budget of £10 million, was the most expensive advertisement by the company at that point.

The 2000s also saw a series of television advertisements, entitled Brilliant! in which two crudely animated Guinness brewmasters would discuss the beer, particularly the ability to drink it straight from the bottle. The two would almost always react to their discoveries with the catchphrase "Brilliant!", hence the campaign's title.

In 2009, the To Arthur advertisement, which started with two friends realising the company's long history, hail each other by lifting up their glasses and saying: "to Arthur!". The hailing slowing spread throughout the bar to the streets outside, and finally around the world. The advertisement ends with the voiceover: "Join the worldwide celebration, of a man named Arthur".

This gave rise to the event now known as Arthur's Day, described as "a series of events and celebrations taking place around the world to celebrate the life and legacy of Arthur Guinness and the much-loved Guinness beer which Arthur brought to the world."

Following the COVID-19 pandemic and pub closures, Guinness produced a "Looks Like Guinness" advert in anticipation of pubs reopening in 2021.

As of 2024, Guinness is the official beer of the Premier League.

== Worldwide sales ==
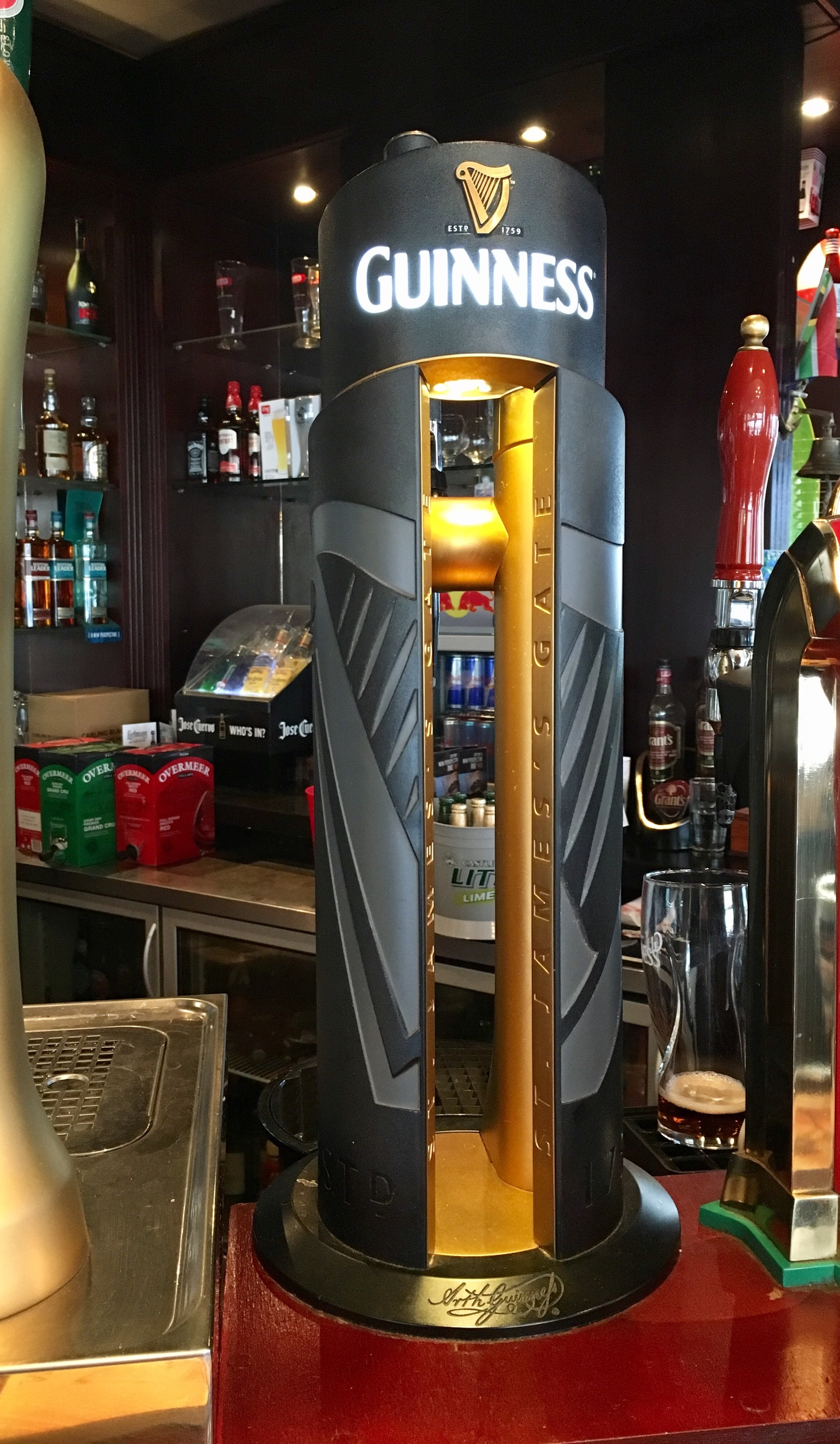
A Guinness counter mount and tap in a Johannesburg pub

In 2006, sales of Guinness in Ireland and the United Kingdom declined 7 percent. Despite this, Guinness still accounts for more than a quarter of all beer sold in Ireland. By 2015, sales were on the rise in Ireland but flat globally. By 2023, Guinness had grown to become the most popular draught beer in the United Kingdom, with about 11% of all sales.

Guinness began retailing in India in 2007.

Guinness has a significant share of the African beer market, where it has been sold since 1827. About 40 percent of worldwide total Guinness volume is brewed and sold in Africa, with Foreign Extra Stout the most popular variant. Three of the five Guinness-owned breweries worldwide are located in Africa.

The beer is brewed under licence internationally in several countries, including Nigeria, the Bahamas, Canada, Cameroon, Kenya, Uganda, South Korea, Namibia, and Indonesia.

In 2017, Guinness teamed up with AB InBev to distribute Guinness in mainland China. China is the single biggest worldwide alcohol market, especially for imported craft beers like Guinness. In 2025, AB InBev started brewing Guinness under licence in China. Initial reception was not favourable, with one publican reportedly stating that the "feedback from everyone is that it tastes like cigarettes or an ashtray. The taste is not the same at all and the aftertaste is terrible". In November 2025, Diego announced a "double-digit" decline in sales in China.

The United Kingdom is the only sovereign state to consume more Guinness than Ireland. In 2023, a pub in Worcester claimed to offer the cheapest pint of Guinness in the UK, at £2. The third-largest Guinness drinking nation is Nigeria, followed by the USA; the United States consumed more than 950,000 hectolitres (21,000,000 imp gal; 25,000,000 US gal) of Guinness in 2010.

== Merchandising ==
The Guinness Storehouse at St. James's Gate Brewery in Dublin is the most popular tourist attraction in Ireland (attracting over 1.7 million visitors in 2019) where a self-guided tour includes an account of the ingredients used to make the stout and a description of how it is made. Visitors can sample the smells of each Guinness ingredient in the Tasting Rooms, which are coloured with a unique lighting design that emits Guinness's gold and black branding.

The Guinness Book of Records started as a Guinness marketing giveaway, based on an idea of its then Managing Director, Sir Hugh Beaver. Its holding company, Guinness World Records Ltd, was owned by Guinness plc, subsequently Diageo, until 2001.

The 2025 drama series House of Guinness deals with the growth of the business in 19th century Ireland.
