= Hop House 13 =

Irish lager

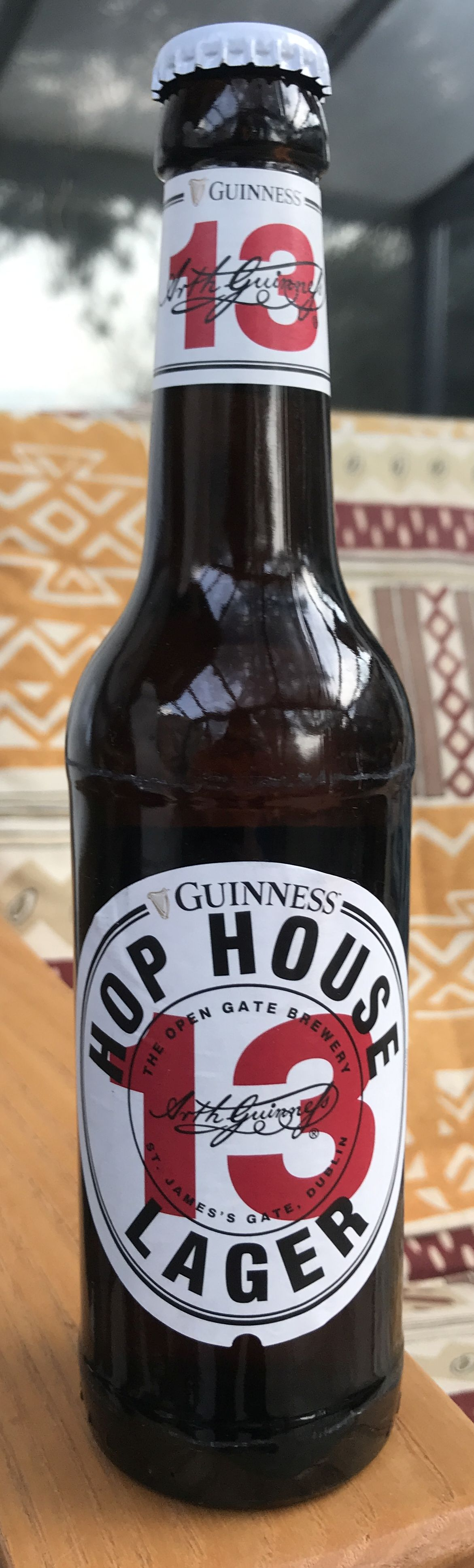
- Type: Lager
- Manufacturer: The Brewers Project
- Distributor: Diageo
- Origin: Ireland
- Introduced: 2015
- Alcohol by volume: 4.6%
- Proof (US): 10
- Colour: Golden amber
- Flavour: Apricot and peach

Hop House 13 is an Irish lager produced by the Guinness Brewery, an Irish brewing company owned by Diageo.

== Background ==
Hop House 13 is brewed by the Guinness Brewers Project, which also manufactures Guinness Dublin Porter, Guinness West Indies Porter and Guinness Golden Ale. The beer is named after a hop store building at St James Gate that existed in the early 20th century. It was influenced by the craft beer industry which had become successful.

== Flavour ==
Hop House 13 is a double-hopped lager brewed with barley, Guinness yeast, Australian Galaxy and Topaz hops, and American Mosaic hops.

It is described as having a fruity aroma including tastes of apricot and peach, having a full-flavoured taste that is crisp and hoppy without being bitter. It has a golden amber colour with an ivory white head. Hop House 13 is 4.1% alcohol by volume, though it can be 5% in certain markets. In the United Kingdom, it has just been downgraded to 4.6% ABV from 5% ABV.

== Distribution ==
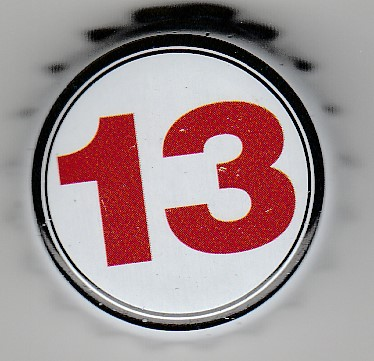
Hop House 13 bottle cap

Hop House 13 was first produced in Ireland in 2015. It was launched with an interactive experience show which included a tour of the brewery and tasting workshops. It was a success, and the beer was ordered by numerous publicans immediately after launch. Hop House 13 was subsequently exported to the UK, and then worldwide. A year after being announced, it was available in 1,000 pubs and other licensed premises in the UK, as well as off-trade bottles being shipped in supermarkets. The beer was heavily promoted with a multi-million pound advertising campaign in 2016, including adverts on YouTube and other social media websites.

Partly as a result of strong sales of Hop House 13, sales of Guinness products in Europe increased by 2%. In 2019, Diageo announced the beer would be sold in South Korea. Diageo discontinued Hop House 13 in Great Britain in 2021 following falling sales in comparison to Guinness.
