= Guinness Foreign Extra Stout =

Stout produced by the Guinness Brewery

- Type: Stout
- Manufacturer: Diageo
- Origin: Ireland
- Introduced: 1801
- Alcohol by volume: 7.5 (varies)
- Colour: Deep ruby red
- Flavour: Roasted malt, dark cherries, diacetyl
- Ingredients: Grain, water, hops and yeast
- Variants: Guinness Extra Smooth
- Website: Foreign Extra Stout

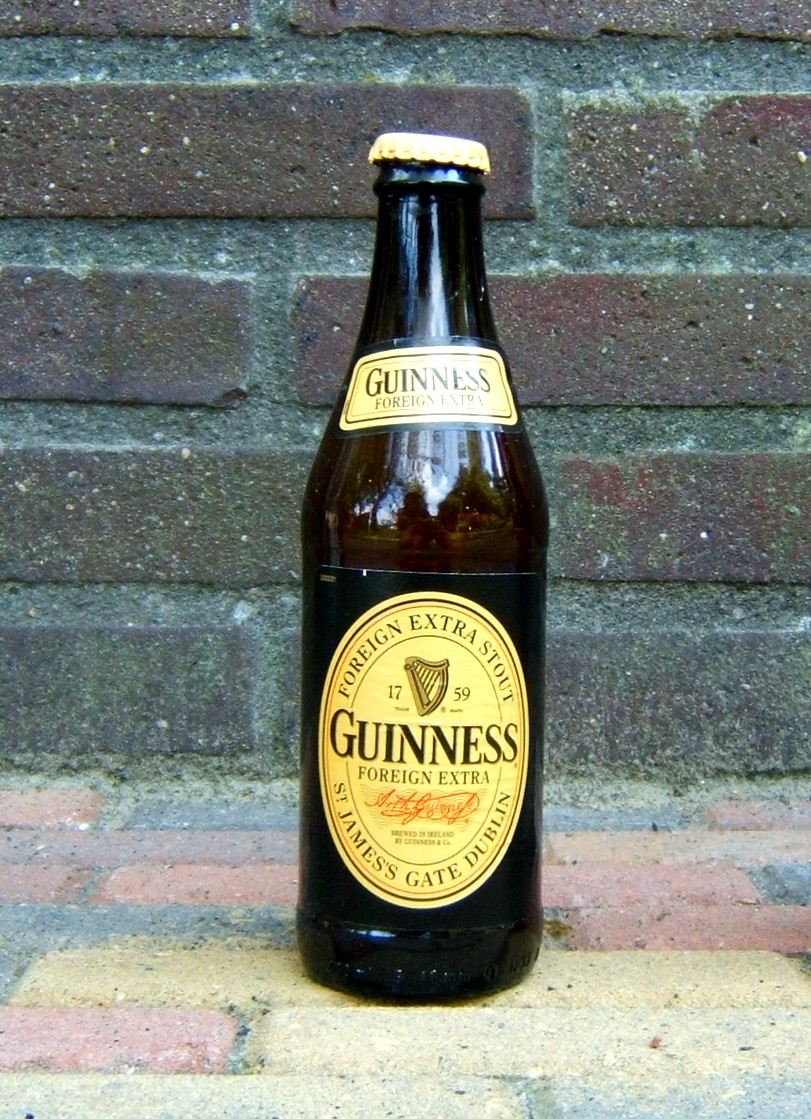
Guinness Foreign Extra Stout bottle label until 2005

Guinness Foreign Extra Stout (FES) is a stout produced by the Guinness Brewery, an Irish brewing company owned by Diageo, a drinks multinational. First brewed by Guinness in 1801, FES was designed for export, and is more heavily hopped than Guinness Draught and Extra Stout, which gives it a more bitter taste, and typically has a higher alcohol content (at around 7.5% ABV). The extra hops were intended as a natural preservative for the long journeys the beer would take by ship.

FES is the Guinness variant that is most commonly found in Asia, Africa and the Caribbean, and it accounts for almost half of Guinness sales worldwide. Over four million hectolitres of the beer were sold in Africa in 2011.

Guinness Flavour Extract, a dehydrated, hopped wort extract made from barley malt and roasted barley, is used for overseas production of the stout. The syrup is shipped from Ireland, where it is added at the ratio of 1:49 to locally brewed pale beer. In most overseas markets, Guinness Flavour Extract (GFE) is blended with locally brewed beer to produce FES.

FES was marketed in Nigeria as "gives you power" in the 1960s. This was updated for 1999–2006 with the Michael Power campaign, which aired across Africa.

== History ==
Guinness West India Porter, the direct predecessor of Foreign Extra Stout, was first exported from the St. James's Gate Brewery in Dublin in 1801. The product was formulated for Irish immigrant workers in the Caribbean. The beer was brewed solely in the cooler months between October and April in order to reduce acidification, and was matured in large wooden vats for up to two years, which gave the finished product greater stability. To survive the long journey overseas, which was then taken by ship, it was brewed with extra hops and a higher alcohol content, which acted as natural preservatives for the beer. Exported in barrels, the product was then bottled locally, which helped to reduce costs. The 1801 recipe included 73 per cent pale malt and 27 per cent brown malt.

The first recorded shipment of the beer to the United States was in 1817. The first official shipment of Guinness to Africa arrived in Sierra Leone in 1827. The beer was renamed Foreign Extra Stout from around 1849 onwards. The first recorded exports to South East Asia began in the 1860s.

FES accounted for around five per cent of all Guinness production at the turn of the twentieth century, with two-thirds destined for Australia and the United States, where it was largely used as a medicinal product. Australia remained the single largest export market for the product until 1910, when it was eclipsed by the United States. Due to the expense of importation, FES was a premium product, retailing for double the price of domestic stouts. Total production had reached 105,000 hogsheads by 1912.

The American trade was disrupted by the onset of World War I and then discontinued entirely with the introduction of Prohibition. The product was not popular when it returned in the 1930s, as drinkers now preferred the lighter and cheaper Guinness Extra Stout. Following discontinuation of export during World War II, FES did not return to the United States until 1956, but this was to prove unsuccessful, and the beer was withdrawn shortly afterwards.

Guinness export sales were mostly to British and Irish expatriates before 1920. This changed from the 1920s onwards, and among the first local people to develop a taste for the drink were the ethnic Chinese of the Malay Peninsula. A global Guinness salesman was appointed by the company in 1924, and sales began to be pursued among local populations.

In 1939, shortly after the outbreak of World War II, the British War Office purchased 500,000 half-pint bottles of FES for distribution to hospitals.

In 1951 exports totalled 90,000 barrels, but by 1964 had grown to 300,000 barrels. By 1959, sales in Ghana had grown large enough for Guinness to establish a joint venture in the country with the United Africa Company. By 1962, Nigeria had become the largest export market for Guinness, with around 100,000 barrels exported to the country every year. This led the company to build a brewery in Ikeja in western Nigeria to supply the demand; it was only the third brewery in the company's history. The brewery cost over £2 million, had a 150,000 barrel capacity, and was 60 per cent owned by Guinness Nigeria, 25 per cent by the United Africa Company with the remaining shares held by local Nigerian interests. Breweries followed in Malaysia (1965), Cameroon (1970) and Ghana (1971), whilst licences were granted to other companies to brew Guinness under contract in other African countries and the West Indies. Historically a small proportion of Guinness production, it was this success, especially in Africa but also in Asia, that allowed FES to grow into a 4.5 million hectolitre brand.

A new bottle design was debuted in Malaysia in 2005, and later rolled out worldwide. In 2013, FES received a packaging redesign in Africa and other selected markets, with a gold foil top and a new label.

== Production ==
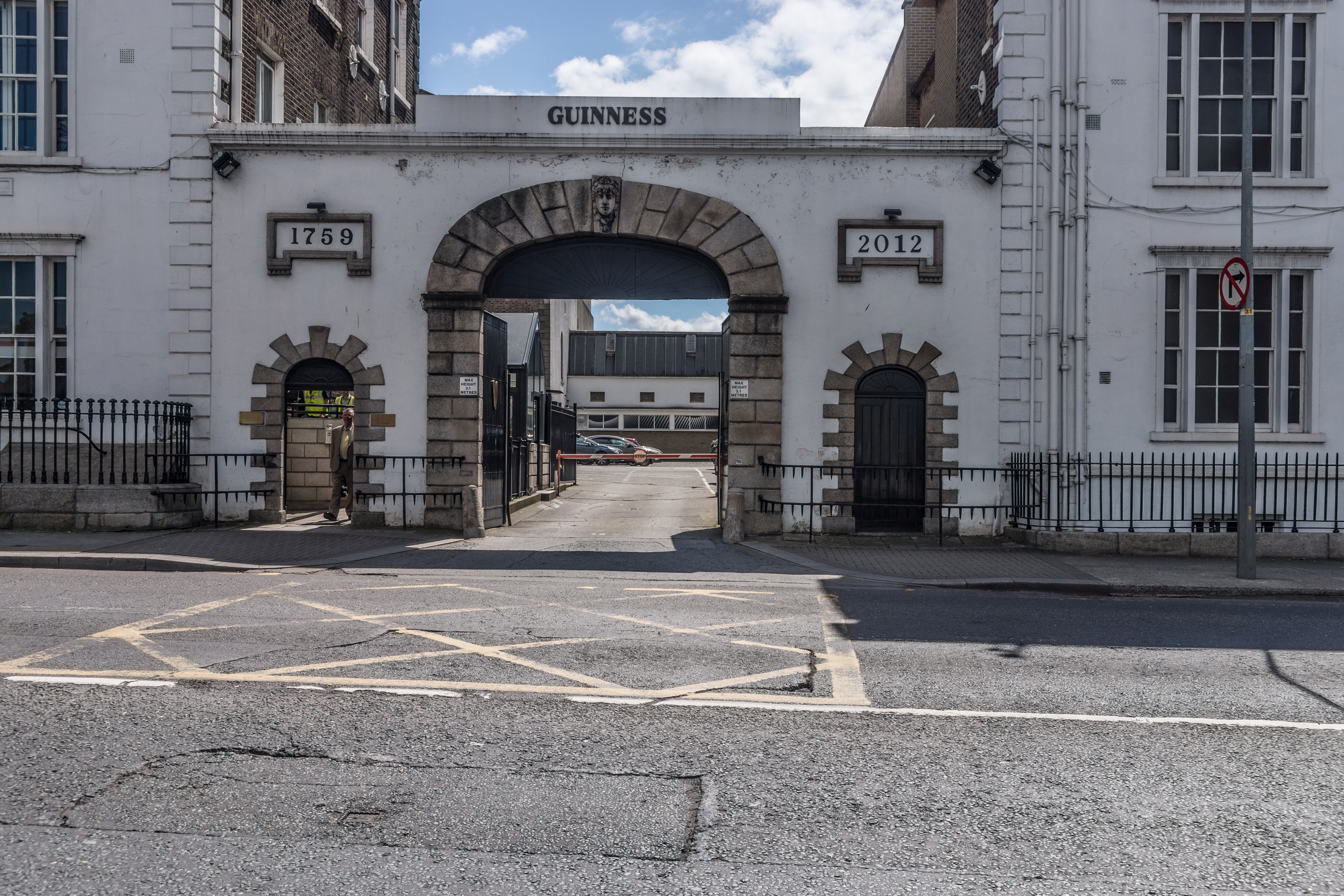
St James's Gate Brewery

The Irish version of FES is brewed with pale malt, 25 per cent flaked barley (for head retention and body) and 10 per cent roasted barley, the latter being what gives the beer its dark hue. It uses the bitter Galena, Nugget and Target hop varieties which have undergone an isomerized kettle extract process. The beer contains about a third more hops, and nearly double the amount of roasted barley than Guinness Draught. The beer is force carbonated. The beer has 47 Bitterness Units.

Guinness have used a slightly different variant of their yeast to brew FES since 1960. It provides extremely poor flocculation and produces relatively high levels of diacetyl in the finished beer. Some breweries regard diacetyl as an off-flavour, but Guinness consider it as a "signature flavour" of FES.

Guinness Flavour Extract, a dehydrated, hopped wort extract made from barley malt and roasted barley, is used for overseas production of the stout. The syrup is shipped from Ireland, where it is added at the ratio of 1:49 to locally brewed pale beer. Each year, six million litres of GFE are made using 9,000 tonnes of barley. Guinness Flavour Extract was first created by scientists working for the company in the early 1960s. In 2003, production of GFE was relocated from St James's Gate to the former Cherry's brewery in Mary Street, Waterford, but in 2013 production returned to St James's.

FES is produced under licence in over 40 countries. Diageo has brewing arrangements with the Castel Group to license brew and distribute Guinness in the Democratic Republic of Congo, Gambia, Gabon, Ivory Coast, Togo, Benin, Burkina Faso, Chad, Mali and Guinea.

FES is the oldest variant of Guinness that is still available, although its ingredients and production methods have varied over time. In 1824, it had an original gravity (OG) of 1082. After a peak in strength in 1840, when the beer had an OG of 1098, by 1860, the beer was reduced to its current standard strength of around 1075 OG. FES was originally brewed with pale and brown malts. Black malt was used from 1819, and by 1828 its use had entirely replaced brown malt. In 1883, the beer was produced with 85 per cent pale malt, 10 per cent amber malt and 5 per cent roasted malt. From 1929 – 1930 onwards, Guinness switched from using roasted malt in the beer's production to roasted barley. Amber malt continued to be added to the grist until 1940. Flaked barley was introduced in the early 1950s, and the hopping rate was decreased.

Originally a bottle conditioned beer, FES has been pasteurised to ensure quality consistency since 1948. Since 1950, in an attempt to recreate the flavour profile of bottle conditioned FES, the beer has been produced by blending fresh FES with two per cent FES that has been aged for up to 100 days, and has developed a high lactic acid content. Finally, the beer is allowed to mature in the bottle for 28 days before being sent out for distribution.

== Markets ==
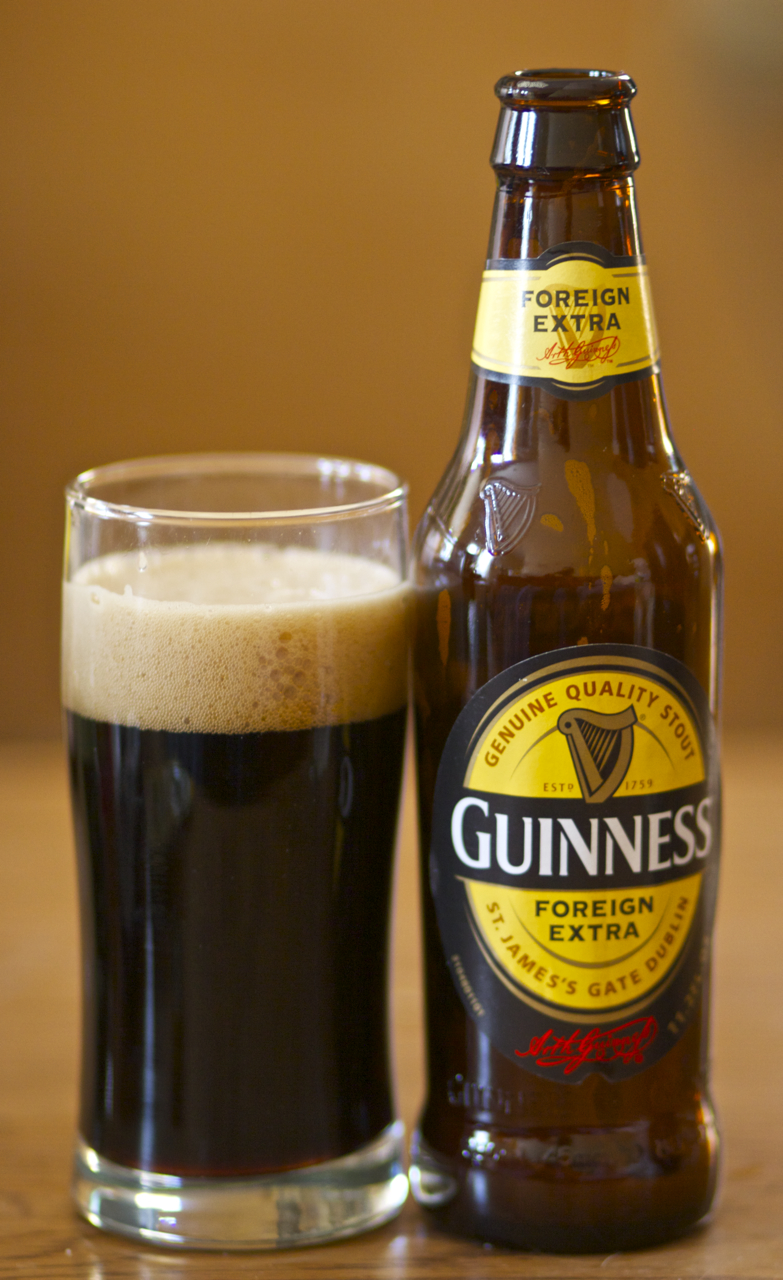
A bottle of Guinness Foreign Extra Stout

Foreign Extra Stout constitutes 45 per cent of total Guinness sales worldwide. Originally exported to British and Irish expatriates, the beer began to be drunk by local populations from the 1920s. A 7.5% ABV version is sold throughout most of the world, although lower strength variants are found in some locations.

The beer is available in bottles and cans.

=== Africa ===
In Africa, the product retails at a premium, at up to double the price of rival beers. FES is produced at thirteen breweries in Africa.

==== Nigeria ====
FES is brewed and distributed by Guinness Nigeria. As of 2012–13, Nigeria has been the largest market for Guinness by sales.

FES was initially introduced into the Nigerian market through importation in the 1940s. Guinness in Nigeria is made with heavily roasted sorghum or maize that has been locally sourced. Some Nigerian versions also contain wheat. The switch from malted barley was made in 1986 when the Nigerian government briefly banned imports of the grain. The use of sorghum and maize continues as it is a cheaper alternative than barley, which has to be imported, and it is less vulnerable to local currency fluctuations. The Nigerian breweries use high gravity brewing techniques to ferment sorghum and pale malt to 1090 OG.

Beer writer Roger Protz describes the Nigerian product as "strikingly different" from the Irish brewed version, and it has been described as being sweeter and heavier than regular FES. Diageo have also confirmed that the carbonation levels are "different" from the Irish-brewed product.

==== Other markets ====
The brewing of FES has taken place at Sierra Leone Brewery since October 1967.

In Ghana, FES is brewed in Kumasi by Guinness Ghana Breweries, which is controlled by Castel Group. GFE is mixed with a locally brewed sorghum lager, but it differs from the Nigerian version in that it contains no wheat and has a higher proportion of roast barley. In Ghana, the product is believed to have medicinal properties, strengthening the blood and improving circulation.

In 2003, a 5.5% ABV, lightly-nitrogenated variant of FES was introduced in Ghana called Guinness Extra Smooth. It was released in Nigeria in 2005, where it constitutes 5-10 per cent of Guinness sales in the country.

Guinness holds 20 percent of the Cameroon beer market.

=== Asia ===
Sales of Guinness in South East Asia amounted to over £100 million in 2012-13. FES (6.8% ABV) is brewed and distributed in Malaysia by Heineken Malaysia Berhad. The Malaysian variant is distributed throughout most of South East Asia. The brew was reduced in ABV from 8 to 6.8% in 2008, and further reduced to 5.5% ABV from 2016, in response to changes in alcohol duty. Malaysia is the largest Asian market for Guinness, where, in 2012, the brand grew by between 10 and 15 per cent. In Singapore, FES is brewed and distributed by Asia Pacific Breweries. In Indonesia, Guinness is brewed to 4.9% ABV by PT Multi Bintang (a subsidiary of Asia Pacific Breweries), and is distributed by PT Dima Indonesia. In China, small amounts of FES are sold, where it is positioned as a premium priced import in upmarket bars.

=== Americas ===
FES is also brewed under license by Commonwealth Brewery (CBL) in the Bahamas, a Heineken N.V. subsidiary. It is the number 1 selling Stout in The Bahamas. The Commonwealth Brewery in Nassau began brewing the stout in 1987.

=== Other markets ===
FES was sold and then withdrawn in the UK in 1976 as Guinness XXX Extra Strong Stout; it returned in 1994 when interest in craft beer increased. The beer was again withdrawn from the UK market, returning in 2003 to cater for the increasing African diaspora. The British market is supplied with both the Irish and the Nigerian brewed variants of the beer, the latter of which has annual sales of £2 million. Official imports of FES into the US were resumed in 2010, following a resurgent interest in craft beer; this was after a period of grey imports, predominantly for African and Caribbean expatriates.

== Advertising and sponsorship ==
In the 1960s, FES was marketed in Nigeria as "gives you power" and its consumption was linked with an increase in sexual potency. This was updated for 1999–2006 with the Michael Power campaign, which aired all over the continent. Guinness credits the campaign with allowing the company to lead the Africa beer market by 50 per cent in 2000, experience volume growth of up to 50 per cent in some markets, achieve brand recognition of a reported 95 per cent, and by doubling Guinness sales in Africa by 2003. In 1999, Saatchi & Saatchi was given worldwide responsibility for marketing the FES brand. In October 2013, BBDO was awarded responsibility for marketing Guinness in Africa. Saatchi continues to market FES in the rest of the world. Since 2008, FES has been the largest sponsor of the Nigerian national football team.

== Reception ==
The beer is ranked highly on beer rating websites. Garrett Oliver notes its refreshing qualities and "distinctive acidic edge". On the other hand, it has been criticised by British journalist Tony Naylor as being "more about treacly, boozy warmth" than "complex flavour".
