= Guinness Brewery =

Brewery in Dublin, Ireland

Coordinates: 53°20′40″N 6°17′20″W

St. James's Gate Brewery Guinness Brewery
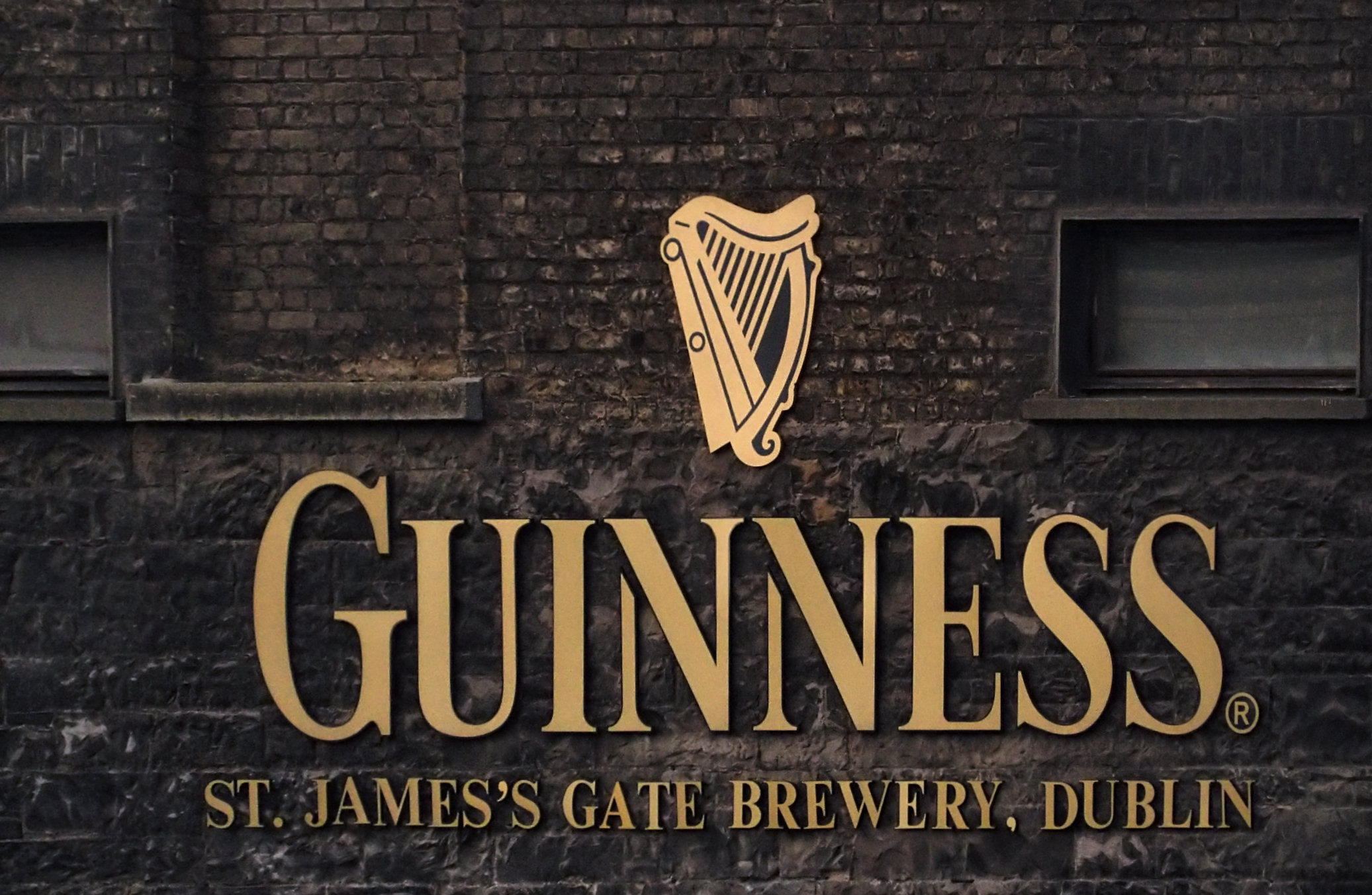
- Type: Private
- Industry: Alcoholic beverages
- Founded: 1759; 267 years ago, in St. James's Gate, Dublin, Ireland.
- Founder: Arthur Guinness
- Headquarters: Dublin, Ireland
- Area served: Worldwide
- Products: Guinness Draught
- Production output: 82.9 million hectolitres 50.7 million barrels
- Parent: Diageo (1997–present)
- Website: www.guinness.com

St. James's Gate Brewery is a brewery founded in 1759 in Dublin, Ireland, by Arthur Guinness. The company is now a part of Diageo, a company formed from the merger of Guinness and Grand Metropolitan in 1997. The main product of the brewery is Draught Guinness.

Originally leased in 1759 to Arthur Guinness at £45 per year for 9,000 years, the St. James's Gate area has been the home of Guinness ever since. It became the largest brewery in Ireland in 1838, and the largest in the world by 1886, with an annual output of 1.2 million barrels. Although no longer the largest brewery in the world, it remains as the largest brewer of stout. The company has since bought out the originally leased property, and during the 19th and early 20th centuries, the brewery owned most of the buildings in the surrounding area, including many streets of housing for brewery employees, and offices associated with the brewery. The brewery had its own power plant.

There is an attached exhibition on the 250-year-old history of Guinness, called the Guinness Storehouse.

== History ==
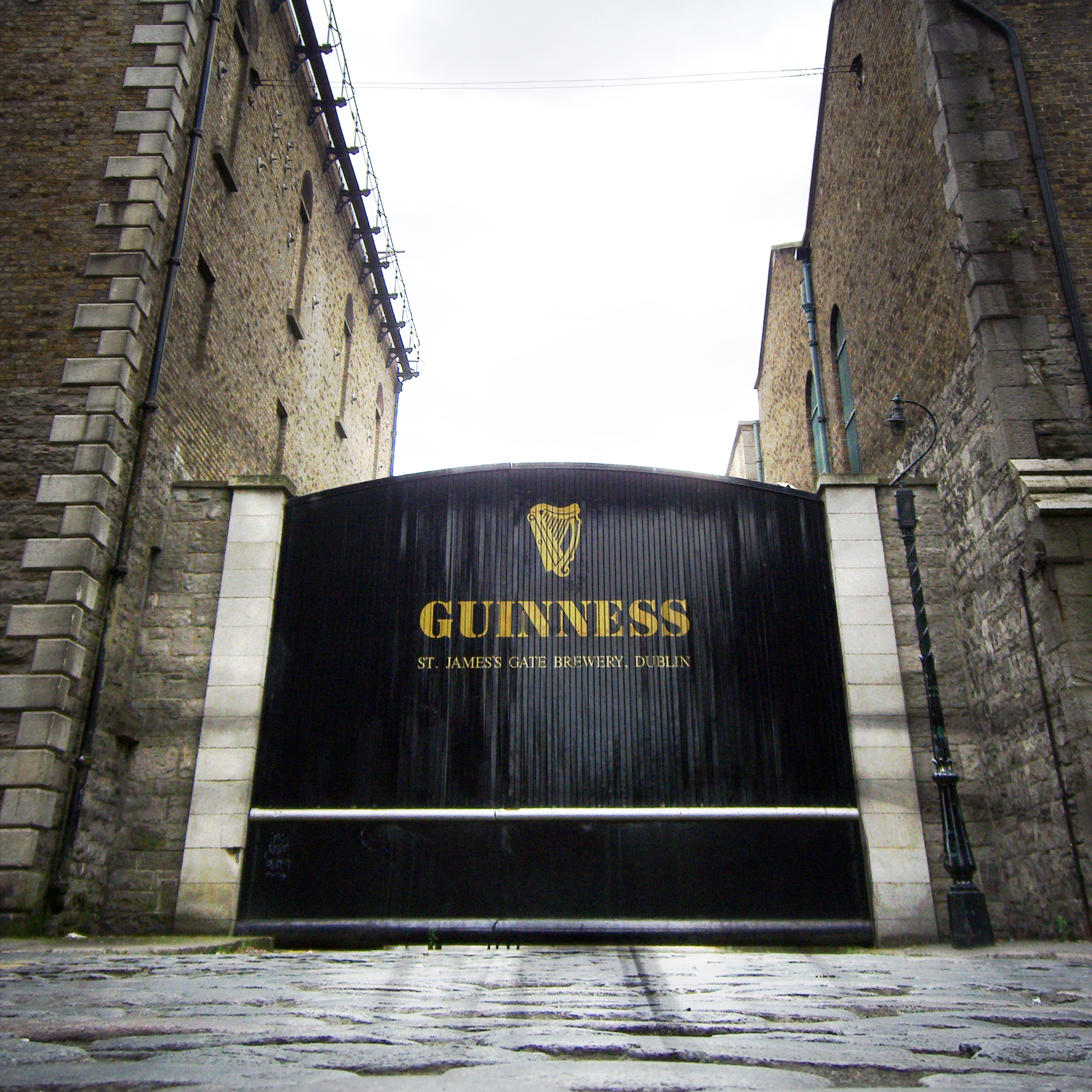
Gate at Guinness Brewery

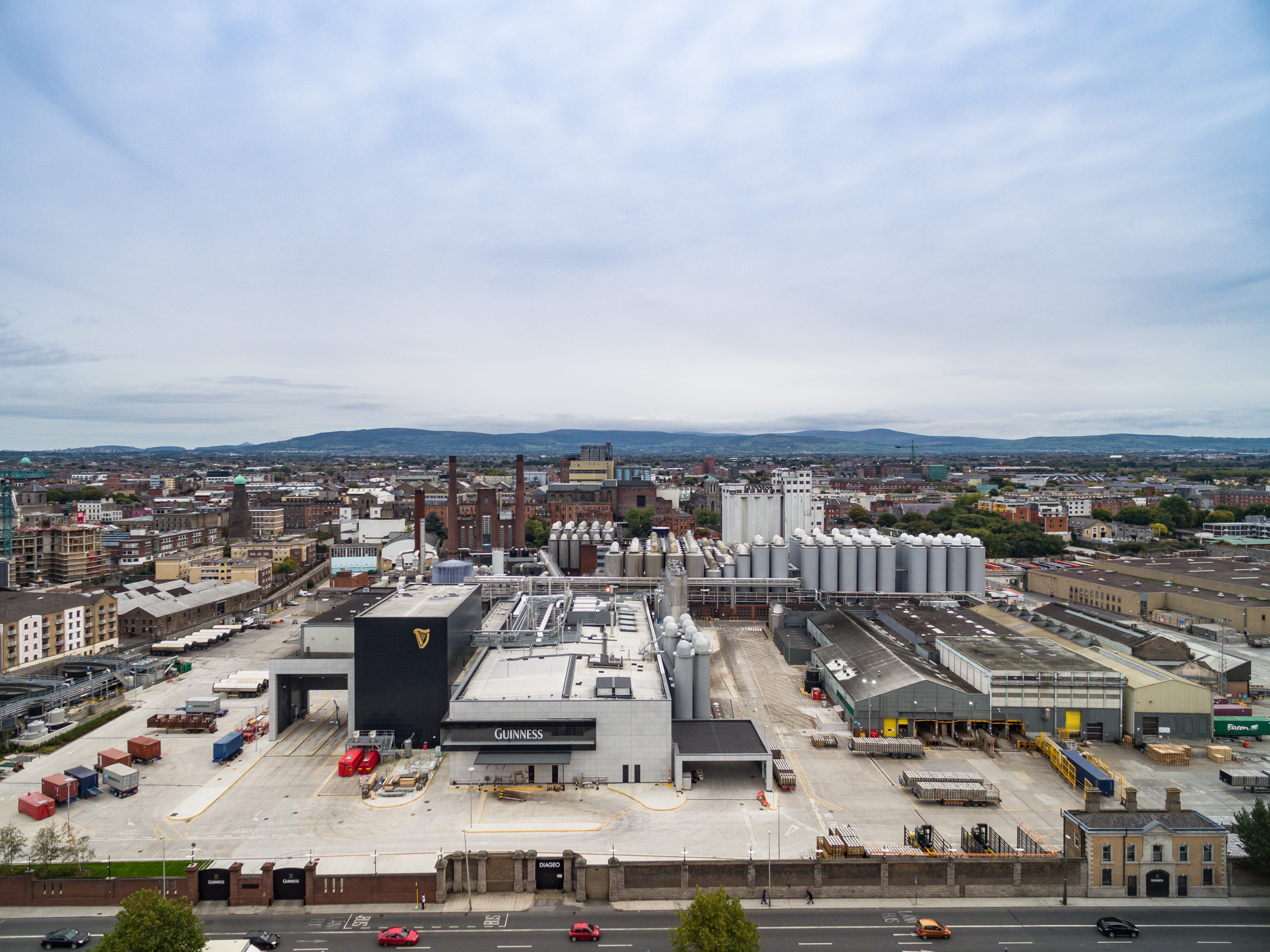
Guinness Brewery in Dublin

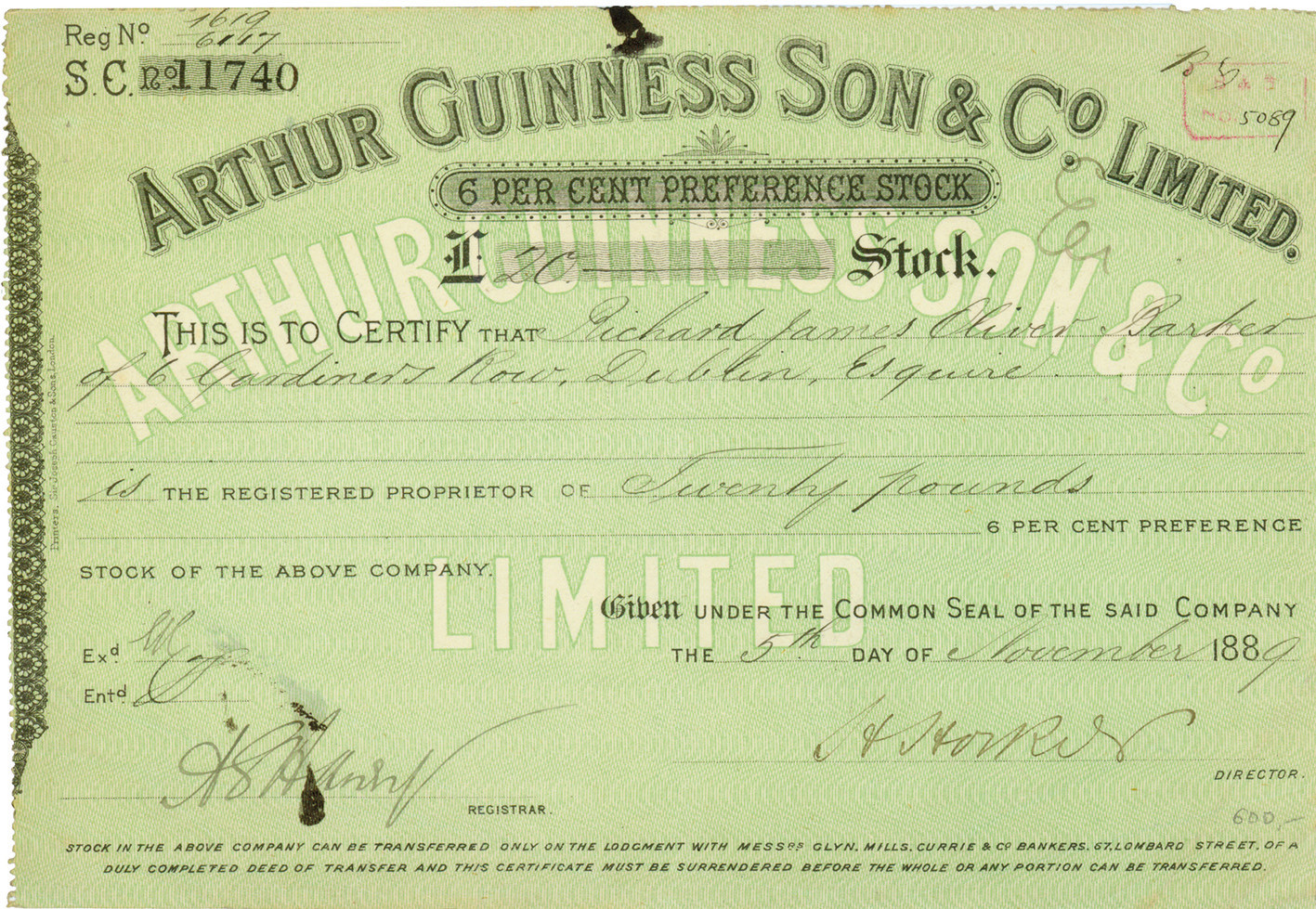
Arthur Guinness Son & Co. Limited, 6% Preference Stock, issued 5. November 1889

Arthur Guinness started brewing ales in Leixlip, County Kildare, and then from 1759 at the St. James's Gate Brewery in Dublin. On 31 December, he signed a 9,000-year lease at £45 per annum for the unused brewery. However, the lease is no longer in effect because the brewery property has been bought out when it expanded beyond the original 4-acre site.

Ten years after establishment, on 19 May 1769, Guinness exported his beer (he had ceased ale brewing by then) for the first time, when six and a half barrels were shipped to England. The business expanded by adopting steam power and further exporting to the English market. On the death of Sir Benjamin Lee Guinness in 1868, the business was worth over £1 million, and the brewery site had grown from about 1 acre to over 64 acres. In 1886, his son Edward sold 65 per cent of the business by a public offering on the London Stock Exchange for £6 million.

London brewers Whitbread and Barclay Perkins accounted for 80% of the porter sold in Dublin in the 1770s, but by the early 1890s, Guinness was exporting to markets across the British Empire and beyond; from the Caribbean to West Africa to Australia. The market reach of Guinness stout was fuelled by the capital raised in 1886. The flotation allowed Guinness to outpace rivals like Whitbread - which would bottle Guinness stout from 1904 - ensuring its dominance well into the 20th century.

The company pioneered several quality control efforts. The brewery hired the statistician William Sealy Gosset in 1899, who achieved lasting fame under the pseudonym "Student" for techniques developed for Guinness, particularly Student's t-distribution and the even more commonly known Student's t-test.

Because of the Irish Free State's "Control of Manufactures Act" in 1932, the company moved its headquarters to London later that year. Guinness brewed its last porter in 1974.

In 1983, a non-family chief executive Ernest Saunders was appointed and arranged the reverse takeover of the leading Scotch whisky producer Distillers in 1986. Saunders was then asked to resign following revelations that the Guinness stock price had been illegally manipulated (see Guinness share-trading fraud).

In 1986, Guinness PLC was in the midst of a bidding war for the much larger Distillers Company. In the closing stages, Guinness' stock rose 25 per cent — which was unusual, since the stock of the acquiring company usually falls in a takeover situation. Guinness paid several people and institutions, most notably American arbitrageur Ivan Boesky, about US$38 million to buy US$300 million worth of Guinness stock. The effect was to increase the value of its offer for Distillers, whose management favoured merging with Guinness.

In the course of the investigation, it emerged that Bank Leu was involved in half of the purchases. Two of Guinness' directors signed under-the-table agreements in which Bank Leu subsidiaries in Zug and Lucerne bought 41 million Guinness shares. Guinness secretly promised to redeem the shares at cost, including commissions. To fulfil its end of the bargain, Guinness deposited $76 million with Bank Leu's Luxembourg subsidiary.

As Distillers was worth more than Guinness plc, the Guinness family shareholding in the merged company went below 10 per cent, and today no member of the family sits on the board. Guinness acquired the Distillers Company in 1986.

The company merged with Grand Metropolitan in 1997, to form Diageo plc, capitalised in 2006 at about 40 billion euros.

The Guinness brewery in Park Royal, London, closed in 2005. A major expansion project, undertaken by Sisk Group at a cost of €153 million was completed at the St. James's Gate Brewery in Dublin in June 2013. This allowed the production of all Guinness sold in the United Kingdom and the Republic of Ireland to be switched to the St. James's Gate Brewery.

In 2018, Guinness opened its first brewery in 64 years in the United States, in Baltimore, Maryland. The last Guinness brewery in the US closed in 1954. This US location focuses on "special news" and Guinness Blonde American Lager, but not the classic stout, which is still imported from Dublin.

According to a Diageo publication in 2019, the St James' Gate brewery was then operating at over 90 percent capacity and one of the "most profitable breweries in the world".

== Products ==
The main product is Guinness Draught, a 4.2% ABV dry stout that is one of the most successful beer brands worldwide. For many years a portion of the drink was aged to give a sharp lactic flavour, although Guinness has refused to confirm whether this still occurs. The thick creamy head is the result of the beer being mixed with nitrogen when being poured. It is popular with Irish people both in Ireland and abroad and is the best-selling alcoholic drink in Ireland where Guinness & Co. makes almost €2 billion annually. The brewery also produces Guinness Original, a 4.3% ABV version of the Draught, without the nitrogen; Kaliber, a low alcohol pale lager; Guinness Bitter, a 4.4% bitter sold in a can with a widget; and the 7.5% Guinness Foreign Extra Stout.

=== Varieties ===
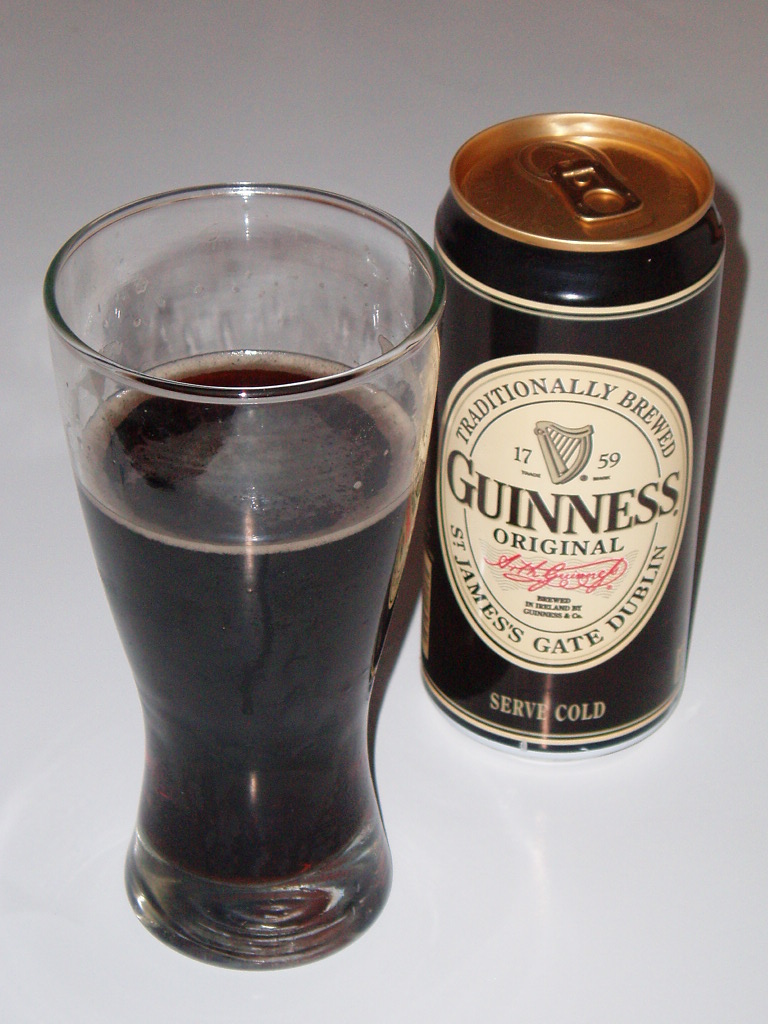
Guinness Original/Extra Stout

Guinness stout is available in a number of variants and strengths, which include:

- Guinness Draught, sold in kegs, widget cans, and bottles: 4.1 to 4.3% alcohol by volume (abv); the Extra Cold is served through a super cooler at 3.5 °C (38.3 °F).
- Guinness Original/Extra Stout: 4.2 or 4.3% ABV in Ireland and the rest of Europe, 4.1% in Germany, 4.8% in Namibia and South Africa, 5.6% in the United States and Canada, and 6% in Australia and Japan.
- Guinness Foreign Extra Stout: 7.5% abv version sold in Europe, America, Africa, the Caribbean and Asia. The basis is unfermented but hopped Guinness wort extract shipped from Dublin, which is added to local ingredients and brewed locally. The strength can vary, for example, it is sold at 5% ABV in China, 6.5% ABV in Jamaica and East Africa, and 8% ABV in Singapore. In Nigeria a proportion of sorghum is used. Foreign Extra Stout is blended with a small amount of intentionally soured beer.
- Guinness Special Export Stout, sold in Germany, Belgium, and the Netherlands, originally brewed in 1945 for the NAAFI to be sent to British troops stationed in Europe.
- Guinness Bitter, an English-style bitter beer: 4.4% ABV.
- Guinness Extra Smooth, a smoother stout sold in Ghana, Cameroon and Nigeria: 5.5% ABV.
- Malta Guinness, a non-alcoholic sweet drink, produced in Nigeria and exported to the UK and Malaysia.
- Guinness Mid-Strength, a low-alcohol stout test-marketed in Limerick, Ireland in March 2006 and Dublin from May 2007: 2.8% ABV.
- Kaliber, a premium alcohol-free lager. It is brewed as a full-strength lager; then at the end of the brewing process, the alcohol is removed: 0.05% ABV.
- Guinness Red, brewed in exactly the same way as Guinness except that the barley is only lightly roasted so that it produces a lighter, slightly fruitier red ale; test-marketed in Britain in February 2007: 4.1% ABV.
- 250 Anniversary Stout, released in the US, Australia and Singapore on 24 April 2009: 5% ABV.
- Guinness Nitro IPA, introduced in September 2015. An ale made with 5 varieties of hops (admiral, celeia, topaz, challenger, and cascade). It is packaged in cans with a nitrogen widget at 5.8% ABV.

In 2005, Guinness announced the Brewhouse Series, a limited-edition collection of draught stouts available for roughly six months each. There were three beers in the series:

- Brew 39 was launched in October 2005. It used the late addition of hops to "give it a smooth and distinctive finish".
- Toucan Brew was introduced in May 2006. It was named after the cartoon toucan used in many Guinness advertisements. This beer had a crisper taste with a slightly sweet aftertaste due to its triple-hopped brewing process.
- North Star was introduced in October 2006 and sold until late 2007. Three million pints of North Star were sold in the latter half of 2007.

Despite an announcement in June 2007 that the fourth Brewhouse stout would be launched in October that year, no new beer appeared and, at the end of 2007, the Brewhouse series appeared to have been quietly cancelled.

Withdrawn Guinness variants include Guinness's Brite Lager, Guinness's Brite Ale, Guinness Light, Guinness XXX Extra Strong Stout, Guinness Cream Stout, Guinness Gold, Guinness Pilsner, Guinness Breó (a slightly citrusy wheat beer), Guinness Shandy, and Guinness Special Light. Breó (meaning 'glow' in ancient Irish) was a wheat beer; it cost around 5 million Irish pounds to develop.

For a short time in the late 1990s, Guinness produced the "St James's Gate" range of craft-style beers, available in a small number of Dublin pubs. The beers were: Pilsner Gold, Wicked Red Ale, Wildcat Wheat Beer and Dark Angel Lager.

A brewing byproduct of Guinness, Guinness Yeast Extract (GYE), was produced until the 1950s.

== Guinness family ==
A grandson of the original Arthur Guinness, Sir Benjamin Lee Guinness, was a Lord Mayor of Dublin and was created a baronet in 1867, only to die the next year. His eldest son Arthur, Baron Ardilaun (1840–1915), sold control of the brewery to Sir Benjamin's third son Edward (1847–1927), who was created Baron Iveagh in 1891 and Earl of Iveagh in 1919. The then Sir Edward Cecil Guinness, 1st Baronet, launched the company on the London Stock Exchange in 1886. Up until then, the only other partners outside of the Guinness family were members of the Purser family, who shared control of the brewery throughout most of the nineteenth century. He, his son Rupert and great-grandson Benjamin, the second and third Earls, chaired the Guinness company until the third earl's death in 1992. There are no longer any members of the Guinness family on the board.

== Plans ==
On 17 June 2007, The Sunday Independent first reported that Diageo was considering selling most of the St. James's Gate Brewery to take advantage of high property prices in Ireland. The story was widely picked up by both national and international media organisations, but the proposal to build a new brewery at Leixlip on land belonging to Desmond Guinness was cancelled by the end of 2008. By then Irish property prices had dropped, and so the possibility of selling much of the current brewery to meet the lower cost of building a new one had passed.

The following day, the Irish Daily Mail ran a follow-up story with a double-page spread complete with images and a history of the plant since 1759. Initially, Diageo said that talk of a move was pure speculation but in the face of mounting speculation in the wake of the Sunday Independent article, the company confirmed that it is undertaking a "significant review of its operations". This review is largely due to the efforts of the company's ongoing drive to reduce the environmental impact of brewing at the St James's Gate plant.

On 23 November 2007, an article appeared in the Evening Herald, a Dublin newspaper, stating that Dublin City Council, in the best interests of the city of Dublin, had put forward a motion to prevent planning permission ever being granted for the development of the site thus making it very difficult for Diageo to sell off the site for residential development.

On 9 May 2008, Diageo announced that the St James's Gate brewery will remain open and undergo renovations, but that breweries in Kilkenny and Dundalk will be closed by 2013 when a new larger brewery is opened near Dublin. The result will be a loss of roughly 250 jobs across the entire Diageo/Guinness workforce in Ireland. Two days later, the Sunday Independent again reported that Diageo chiefs had met with Tánaiste Mary Coughlan, the deputy leader of the Government of Ireland, about moving operations to Ireland from the UK to benefit from its lower corporation tax rates. Several UK firms have made the move to pay Ireland's 12.5 per cent rate rather than the UK's 28 per cent rate. Diageo released a statement to the London Stock Exchange denying the report.

In 2015, Diageo launched the Brewers Project, in an attempt to diversify the company's product range and expand into the craft beer industry which had become popular. Hop House 13, a lager named after a store at the St James's Gate brewery extant in the early 20th century, was heavily promoted on YouTube and social media.

== Camino de Santiago ==
St. James's Gate in Dublin was traditionally the main starting point for Irish pilgrims to begin their journey on the Camino de Santiago (Way of St. James). The pilgrims' passports were stamped here before setting sail, usually for A Coruña, north of Santiago. It is still possible for Irish pilgrims to get these traditional documents stamped both at Guinness Storehouse and St James' Church, and many do, while on their way to Santiago de Compostela.

== Guinness Storehouse ==
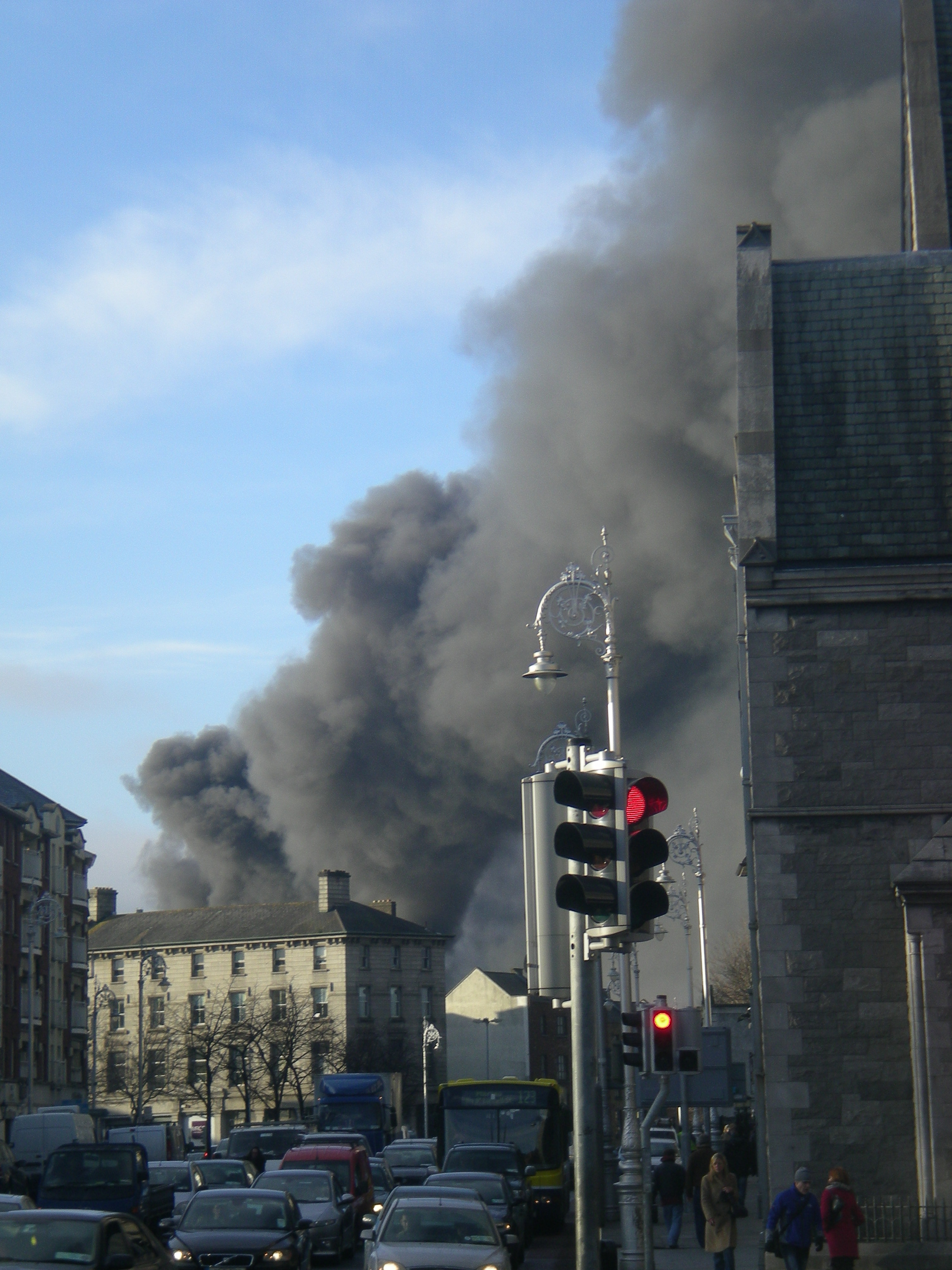
Smoke from a 2009 fire at the brewery in which two firefighters were injured.

Guinness Storehouse, the "Home of Guinness", is Dublin's most popular tourist attraction. A converted brewing factory, it is now a Guinness museum, incorporating elements from the old brewing factory to explain the history of its production. Some of the old brewing equipment is on show, as well as stout ingredients, brewing techniques, advertising methods and storage devices.

The exhibition takes place over seven floors, in the shape of a 14 million-pint glass of Guinness. The final floor is the Gravity Bar, which has an almost 360° panorama over the city, where visitors can claim a pint of "the black stuff".

The storehouse is where they used to add the yeast to the beer for fermentation.

Guinness Storehouse visitors do not get to see the beer being brewed in front of them, but from various vantage points in the building, you may see parts of the brewhouse, vats, grain silos and the keg yard.

== See also ==
- Guinness Brewery tramways
- Guinness World Records – British reference book listing world records
- St James's Gate F.C. – Association football club in Republic of Ireland
