= Tobermory Single Malt =

Tobermory
Region: Isle of Mull
- Owner: Distell
- Founded: 1798
- Founder: John Sinclair
- Status: active
- No. of stills: 4 Wash stills; 4 Spirit stills
- Website: http://www.tobermorymalt.com/

Tobermory
- Age(s): 10 years old 15 years old

Ledaig (standard, sherry, 15, 20, 31, 32)

Tobermory Single Malt is a Scotch whisky distilled by the Tobermory Distillery, Tobermory on the Isle of Mull, a Hebridean island in western Scotland, north of the isle of Islay.

== Production and character ==
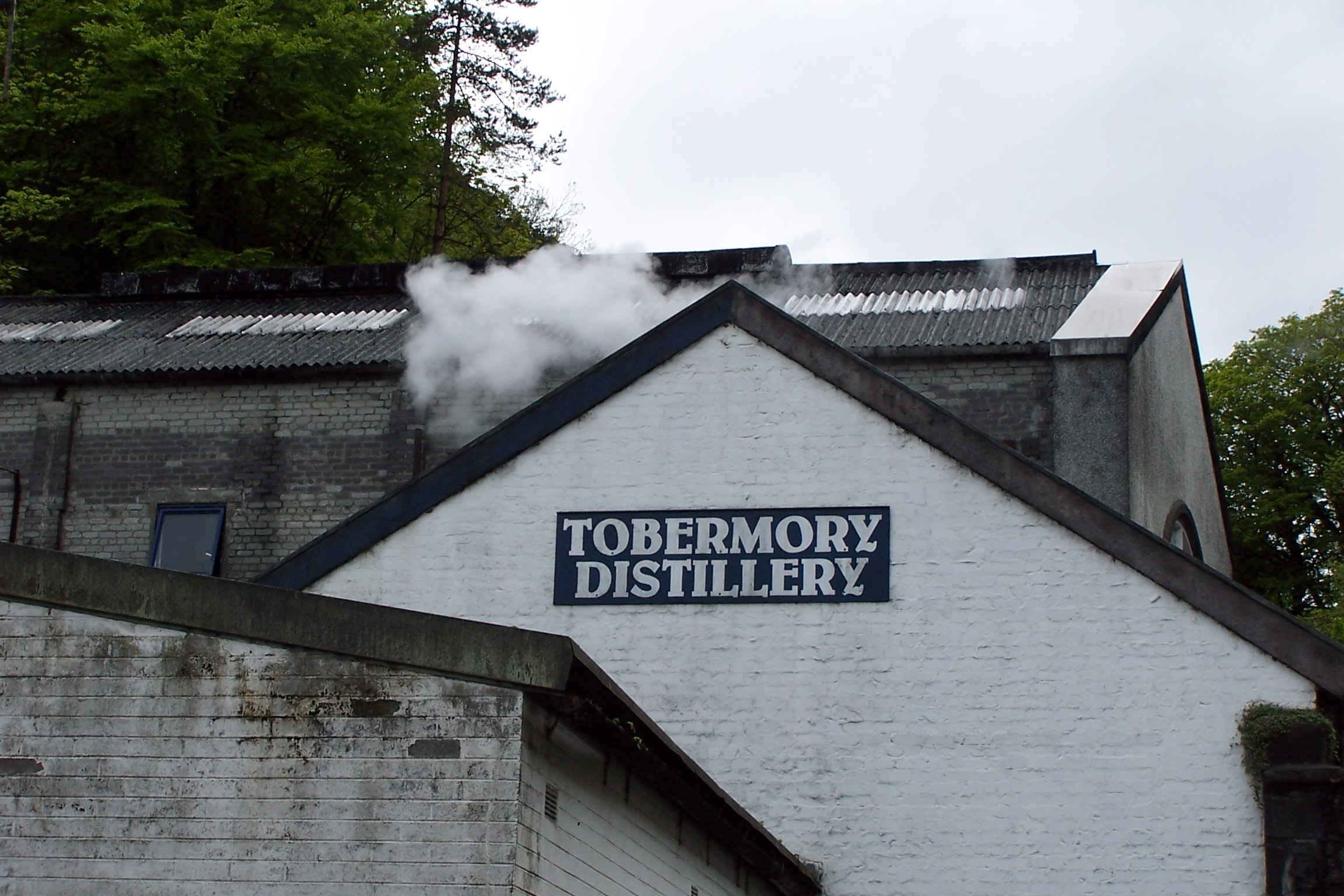
Tobermory Distillery.

The distillery was founded in 1823 in a former brewery, which had been founded in 1797 by John Sinclair. This unpeated malt is part of the Islands subregion of the Highlands. Its yeast and water are drawn from dark aromatic Isle of Mull peat lochans. The flavour is described as a light smoky nose, a medium dry profile with a smooth and fruity tang. The distillery also produces a smaller amount of peated whisky, Ledaig (commonly pronounced /ˈlɛtʃɪk/, though the company has promoted /ləˈtʃaɪɡ/ as more accessible), which is also the original name of the distillery.

Tobermory was originally a vatted malt, but was produced as a single malt after reopening in 1990.

Tobermory is available in various proprietary bottlings as well as being one of the ingredients of the Scottish Leader and Black Prince blends.

== See also ==
- Burn Stewart Distillers, the company that produces Tobermory, Ledaig, Bunnahabhain, Deanston, Scottish Leader, Black Bottle
- CL WorldBrands, briefly owners of Burn Stewart and subsidiary Tobermory Distillery and also owned Angostura
- List of distilleries in Scotland
- Whisky
- Scotch whisky
- List of whisky brands
