= Andrew Watts (cricketer) =

English cricketer

Andrew Watts (born 4 October 1960) is a former English cricketer who played first-class cricket for Derbyshire in 1982 and 1983 and for Boland in South Africa from 1985 to 1987.

Watts was born at Chapeltown, Yorkshire and grew up in Penistone and started playing for Derbyshire in the second XI and for the under 25s in 1980. He made his first team debut in the 1982 season against Hampshire. He played two first team games in the 1983 season, the remainder being in the second XI. After playing one game for the second eleven in 1984, Watts went to South Africa where he played for Boland in first-class matches and in the one-day game.

Watts was a left-hand batsman and played 16 innings in 12 first-class matches with an average of 27.36 and a top score of 57. He also played four one day matches at an average of 10.75. He was a right-arm medium pace bowler and took 19 first-class wickets at an average of 30.57 and a best performance of 4–54. He took two wickets in the one day game.

Today, he makes whisky for the Distell Group and was appointed head of whisky at the company in 2016, after 25 years as Master Distiller at their James Sedgwick distillery in Wellington in South Africa. Watts is only the 6th Master Distiller since the distillery was established in 1886. Under Watts, the distillery produces the Three Ships line of whiskies, including blended and single malt whiskies, and Bain's Cape Mountain Whisky, South Africa's only single grain whisky.

== Recognition ==
In 2012, the World Whiskies Awards selected Three Ships 5 Year Old Premium Select as World's Best Blended Whisky.

In 2014 Watts was named "Wellingtoner of the Year" and "Wellington Businessman of the Year". Awards for services to the town and its community and the only time to date that both awards were given to the same person in the same year!

Bain's was named the World's Best Grain Whisky at the annual Whisky Magazine’s World Whisky Awards (WWA) held in London in 2013 and 2018.

At the World Whisky Awards (WWA) in 2018 he was named the Global Icon Master Distiller/ Master Blender of the Year and at the same WWA awards in 2020 he was named the Global Icon World Whisky Ambassador of the Year.
