= Tobermory distillery =

Whisky distillery in Argyll and Bute, Scotland

Coordinates: 56°37′14″N 6°4′14″W

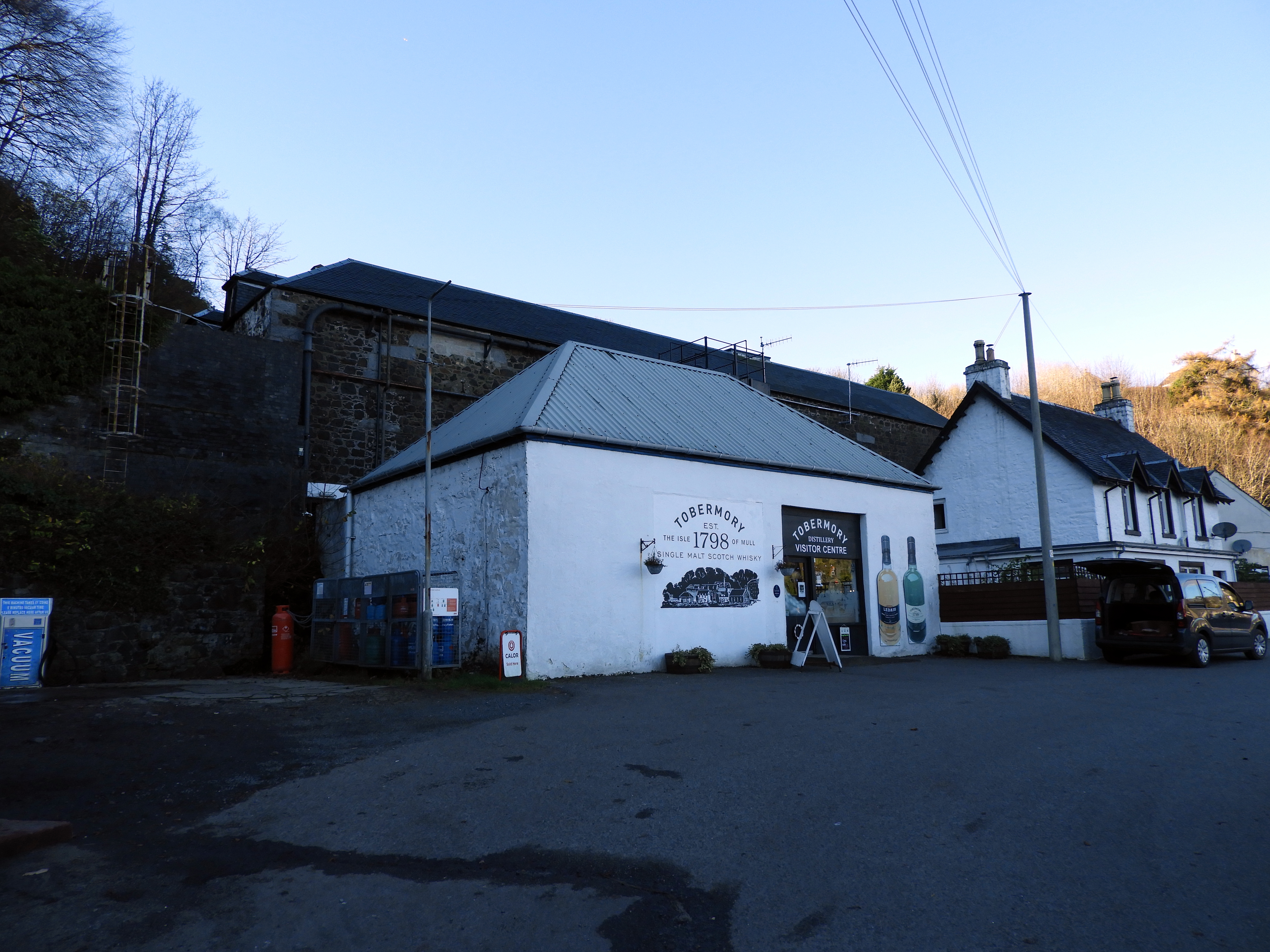
- Location: Isle of Mull, Scotland
- Owner: Distell (Heineken N.V.)
- Founded: 1798
- Founder: John Sinclair
- Status: Operational
- No. of stills: 2 Wash stills; 2 Spirit stills
- Capacity: 1,000,000 L
- Website: tobermorydistillery.com

Tobermory 12
- Age(s): 12 years old
- ABV: 46.3%

Tobermory 21
- Age(s): 21 years old
- ABV: 46.3%

Ledaig 10
- Age(s): 10 years old
- ABV: 46.3%

Ledaig 18
- Age(s): 18 years old
- ABV: 46.3%

Tobermory distillery is an Island single malt Scotch whisky and gin distillery located on the Hebridean island of Mull, Scotland in the town of Tobermory

Is owned by the Scotch whisky producer Distell Group Limited a subsidiary of Heineken N.V,

The distillery, which was formerly known as Ledaig (pronounced Letch-ick), was founded in 1798 and has changed hands several times, having undergone a number of periods of closure. The only distillery on Mull, it is currently owned by Burn Stewart Distillers, a subsidiary of Distell Group Limited of South Africa. Its main product, Tobermory single malt, is used in the blends Scottish Leader and Black Bottle. The distillery also produces a smaller amount of peated whisky, which remains known under the former name, Ledaig.

== History ==
The distillery was founded as Ledaig distillery in 1798 by John Sinclair of Lochaline, ten years after the founding of Tobermory by the British Fisheries Society. Sinclair had originally arrived in the village as a merchant dealing with soda ash from burning the locally available kelp. In April 1797, he applied for 57 acres to the south of the harbor in order to build houses and a distillery. Distilling had been banned in the UK since 1795 in order to save grain for the War of the First Coalition with France. Although he was originally told to build a brewery instead, he remained with the original plan and additionally built a pier known as "Sinclair's Quay".

The current buildings were constructed during that first period of occupation, and were licensed in 1823. In 1822 it was reported that the distillery produced 6,686 gallons of spirit from 10 November 1820 to 10 November 1821.

The distillery is said to have ceased production in 1837 and was put up for sale in 1844 by the proprietor, John Sinclair of Lochaline, by Morven. Presumably the sale was unsuccessful as he put the distillery up for sale again in 1849. and was still for sale in 1851.

Dr. Neil M'Nab Campbell acquired the distillery in 1876 and he fitted it out with equipment from James and Thomas Dale engineers of Townsend Foundry. In 1879 Campbell appointed John and Alexander Mackill of Glasgow agents and production started again. In 1883 they purchased it for the sum of £9,300. However, they went bankrupt in 1887 and the distillery was up for sale again and in 1888 it was acquired by John Hopkins & Co of 25 Gordon Street, Glasgow.

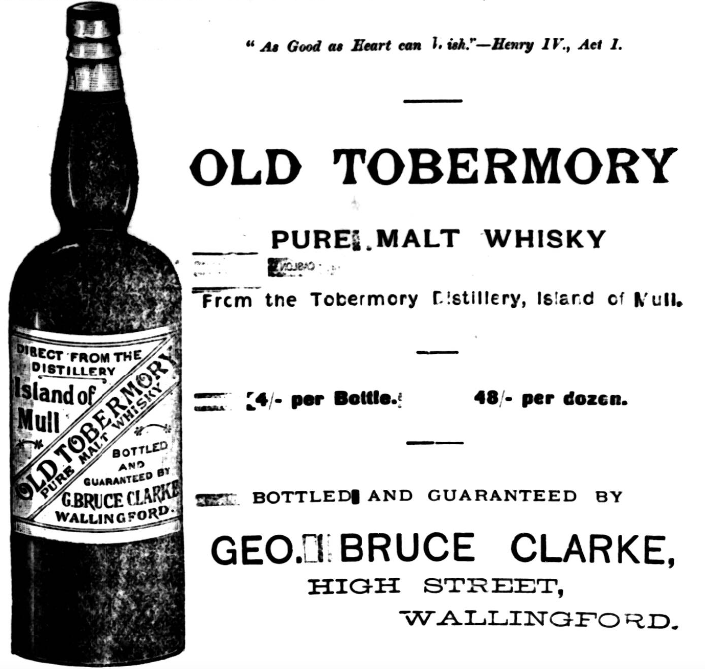
Advert for Old Tobermory from the Berks and Oxon Advertiser 31 July 1903

In 1916 it was acquired by Distillers Company. There was a drop in the demand for whisky due to ten years of prohibition in the United States. and malting ceased in 1930 and small consignments were shipped periodically. The company's best known products at this time were Old Mull and Old Tobermory. In 1936 it was sold to John McLean of Edinburgh and all the contents were transferred to the bonded warehouses of the Scottish Malt Distillers’ Company in Campbeltown.

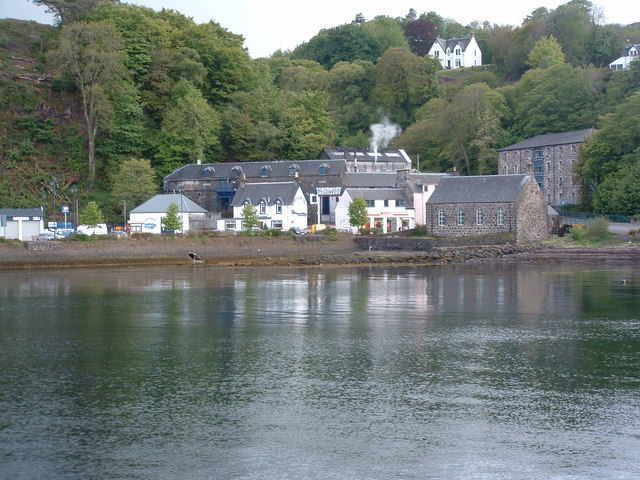
Tobermory distillery viewed from the harbour

In 1972 it was reopened under the name of Ledaig Distillery (Tobermory) Ltd. In May 1975, production had to stop for a month as storage space for the whisky had run out. The construction of a bonded warehouse had been delayed, causing fourteen workers to be laid off in the duration. This was followed by the distillery going into receivership, with it being purchased by the Kirkleavington Property Company in 1978, it opened again between 1979 and 1981. In the 1980s, the warehouses were sold off for conversion into flats, and as such maturation no longer takes place on site. It closed again until 1989, and in 1991 it was purchased by Burn Stewart Distillers for £600,000 plus £200,000 for stock.

Burn Stewart Distillers were bought out by Trinidad–based CL Financial for £49 million in 2002, including the distillery at Tobermory and Deanston. It remains the only whisky distillery on the Isle of Mull, in the main village of Tobermory at the northern tip of the island. Tobermory is known for the variety of colours that the houses of the shore front are painted in and for being the location of the children's television show Balamory. The distillery itself is located at the foot of a steep hill, at the head of the bay.

In 2012, during the driest summer for thirty years, the distillery was forced to halt production temporarily, to preserve the quality and consistency of its whisky. Early the following year, following several further months of unusually dry weather, there was another temporary halt to production. On each occasion, the water level in the small, private loch used to supply water to the distillery had dipped to such an extent that proper rainfall was needed to replenish it to a satisfactory level. In 2013 Burn Stewart was bought by Distell Group Limited of South Africa.

== Production ==
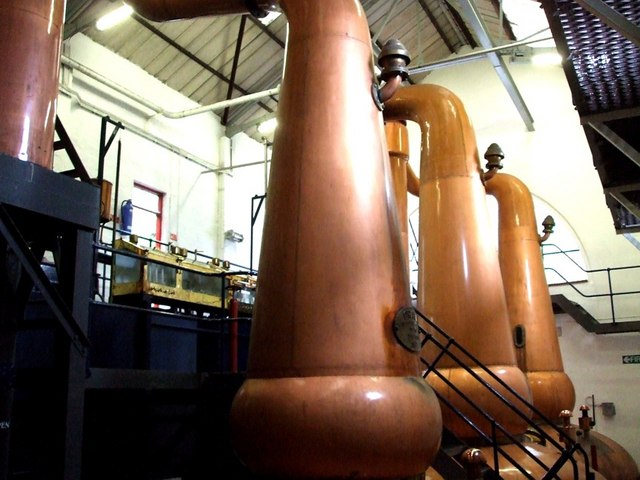
Stills at the Tobermory distillery

The Tobermory Single Malt is distilled from unpeated malted barley and matured in oak casks for at least ten years. A heavily peated whisky is also produced, but in small quantities, named Ledaig after the original distillery name. The malts are used in a number of blends including Scottish Leader and Black Bottle. The water for the distillery comes from a private loch near to the Mishnish lochs. The branding had been confused under previous owners, with the Tobermory brand being used for both a single malt and a blended whisky.

Production was upgraded in 1990, with the distillery becoming capable of producing a million litres of spirit a year. It uses a traditional copper–domed cast iron mash tun, four washbacks made of Oregon pine, and four spirit stills. The whisky is matured in both former bourbon whiskey and sherry casks. Maturation takes place at the distillery at Deanston.

In 2019, the distillery began production of Tobermory Hebridean gin, after sourcing a 1950s John Dore & co. gin still from South Africa. The base spirit made in the gin still is mixed with a small amount of spirit from the whisky stills, before adding Hebridean tea grown on Mull. Thirteen botanicals are used, including elderflower and sweet orange peel. A second gin, Tobermory Hebridean Mountain gin, was launched in October 2020, which used wild heather, rowan berry and rosehip.

== See also ==
- List of whisky brands
- List of distilleries in Scotland
