= Tobermory =

Tobermory may refer to:

== Places ==
- Tobermory, Mull, the chief town of the Isle of Mull in Scotland
  - Tobermory (whisky distillery)
    - Tobermory Single Malt Scotch whisky
  - Tobermory High School
- Tobermory, Ontario, a town on the Bruce Peninsula, Ontario, Canada
  - Tobermory Airport

== Other ==
- Tobermory, the name of one of the Wombles
- "Tobermory" (short story), a 1911 short story by Saki about a cat of the same name, part of The Chronicles of Clovis
- Tobermory Cat, in artworks of Angus Stewart
- Tobermory, a perceptron machine built by Frank Rosenblatt

== See also ==
- Tobermorite, a calcium silicate hydrate mineral found on Mull, Scotland
