= Duprey =

Duprey is a surname. Notable people with the surname include:

- Ana Roque de Duprey (1853–1933), educator, suffragist and one of the founders of the University of Puerto Rico
- Brian Duprey (born 1967), former Maine State Representative from Hampden
- Cyril Duprey (1897–1988), Trinidad and Tobago businessman
- Donalda Duprey (born 1967), Canadian athlete
- Janet Duprey (born 1945), Republican member of the New York State Assembly
- Jean-Pierre Duprey (1930–1959), French poet and sculptor
- Louise Duprey (1957–2000), British character actress
- Maurice Duprey, politician in Manitoba, Canada
- Phil Duprey (1944–2015), American bobsledder
- Rob Duprey, American rock musician
