= Bain's Cape Mountain Whisky =

Bain's Cape Mountain Whiskey
- Manufacturer: Distell Group Limited
- Country of origin: South Africa
- Introduced: 2009
- Alcohol by volume: 43%
- Website: https://www.bainswhisky.com/

Bain's Cape Mountain is a South African brand of whisky distilled at the James Sedgwick distillery in Wellington, Western Cape (Drakenstein Local Municipality). Launched in 2009, Bain's is South Africa's first whisky produced from a single grain, being made from 100% South African-grown yellow maize (corn). Bain's is owned by Distell, a multinational brewing and beverage company based in Stellenbosch, South Africa. Bain's is named after Andrew Geddes Bain, who built the Bainskloof Pass that connects the town of Wellington, where the distillery is located, to the interior of the country in 1853.

== The distillery ==
As of April 2022, the James Sedgwick Distillery is the only commercial whisky distillery in Africa. The distillery produces the Bain's Cape Mountain Whisky brand as well as a number of other whiskies under the Three Ships Label.

Andy Watts, the current Master Distiller, is only the 6th since the distillery was established in 1886.

== Awards ==
Bain's was named the World’s Best Grain Whisky at the annual Whisky Magazine’s World Whisky Awards (WWA) held in London in 2013. Bain's Cape Mountain has also been awarded several gold and silver medals by the International Wine and Spirit Competition.
