= Classic Malts of Scotland =

Whisky collection

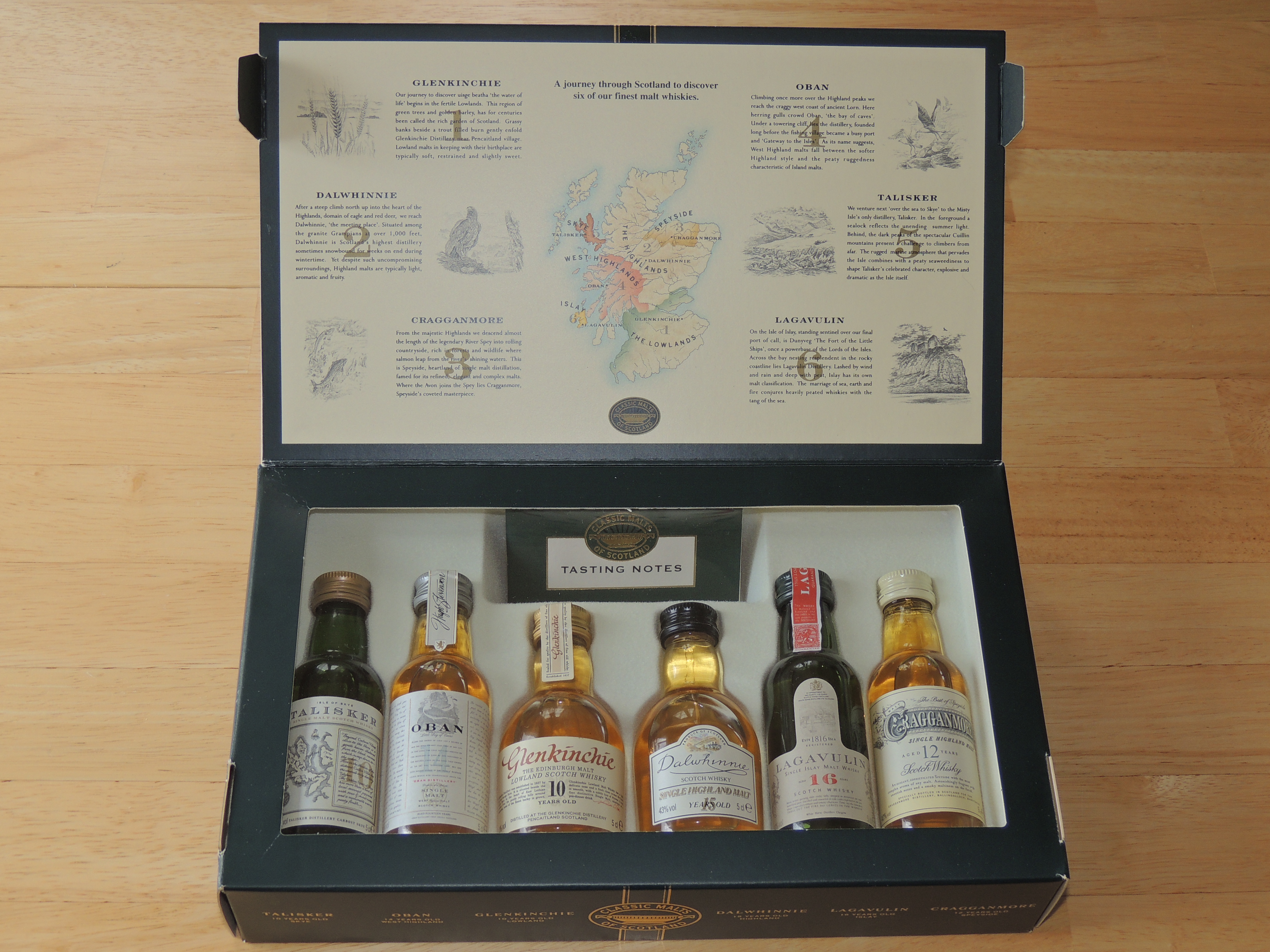
Six Classic Malts of Scotland inside the box

The Classic Malts of Scotland is a selection of six single malt whiskies, launched and marketed together in 1988 by United Distillers and Vintners which is now owned by Diageo. They are often displayed together in bars and liquor stores. Diageo has since marketed other single malt labels and expressions with the Classic Malts labeling. The six original malts are:

Whisky	Age	Alc. %	Region
Glenkinchie	10 years	43%	Lowland
Dalwhinnie	15 years	43%	Highland
Cragganmore	12 years	40%	Speyside
Oban	14 years	43%	West Highland
Talisker	10 years	45.8%	Isle of Skye
Lagavulin	16 years	43%	Islay

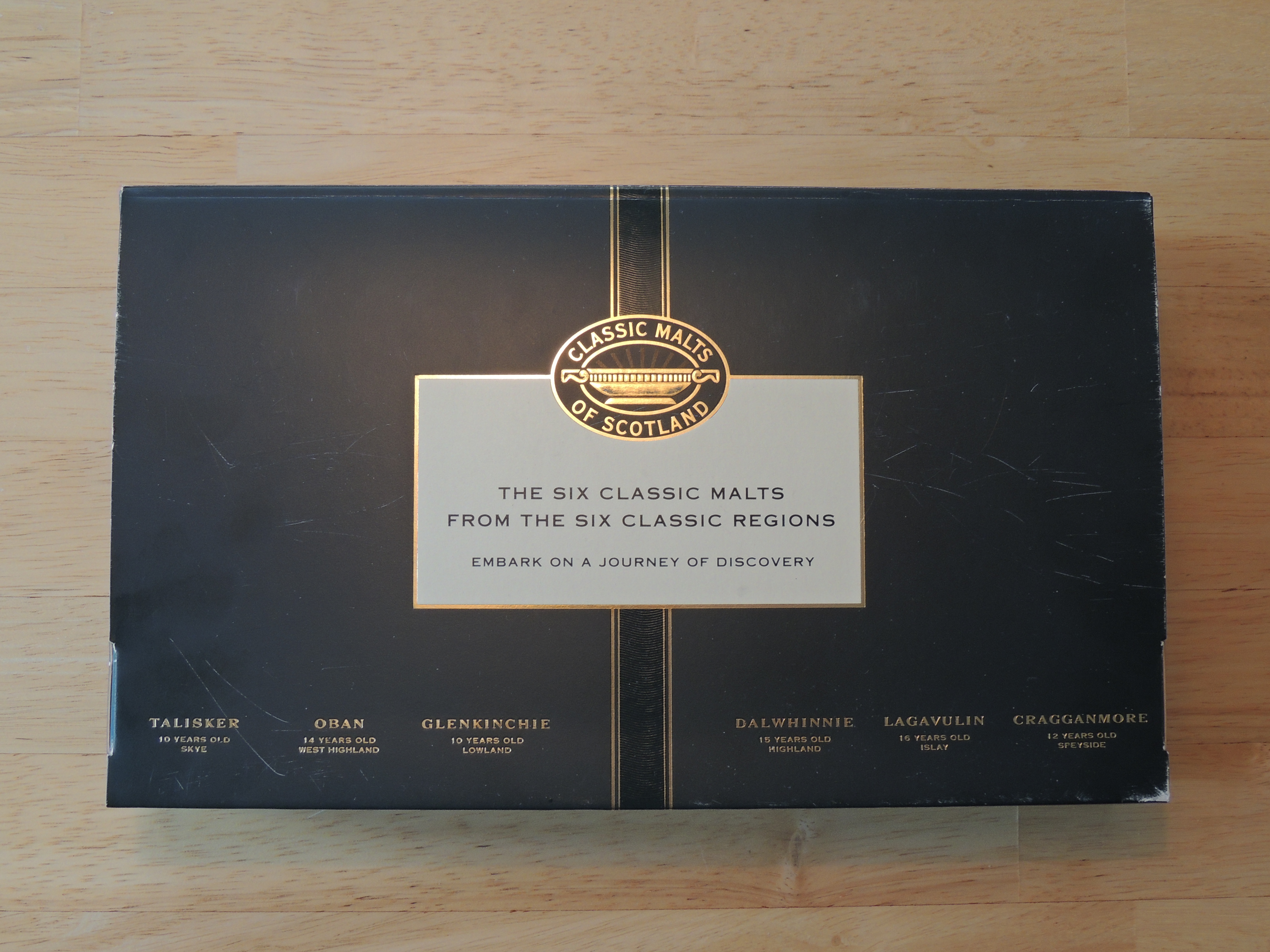
Six Classic Malts of Scotland box

UDV's regions differ from the more conventional categorisations of Highland (and subregion Island), Lowland, Speyside, Campbeltown, and Islay. The region of West Highland was created to separate between Oban and Dalwhinnie. Talisker is the only distillery on the Isle of Skye, which has never been a whisky region unto itself, but would be in the Island subregion; though this categorisation enabled UDV to include both Talisker and Lagavulin, strongly flavoured malts with strong followings. Campbeltown, a formerly prominent whisky-making region, is not featured in the range.

== Distiller's editions ==
All six of the original "Classic Malts" have also been released as limited edition "Distiller's editions", which are finished with additional maturation (beyond the standard edition age) in special casks selected by the master distiller at each distillery. Dalwhinnie is finished in Oloroso casks, Glenkinchie in Amontillado, Cragganmore in Port, Oban in Fino sherry from Montilla, Talisker in amoroso sherry, and Lagavulin in Pedro Ximénez sherry.
