= Cragganmore distillery =

Scotch whisky distillery

Coordinates: 57°24′37″N 3°23′42″W

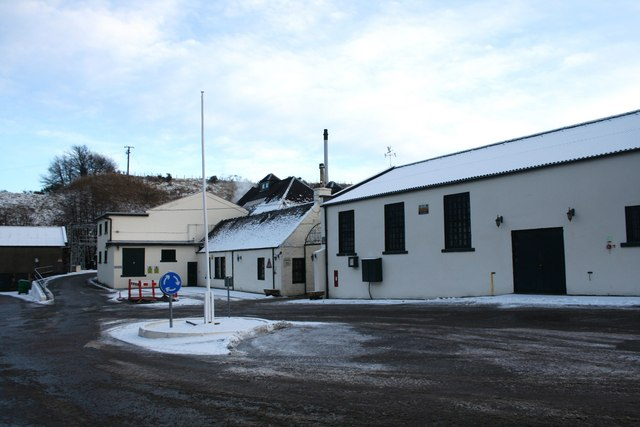

Region: Speyside
- Location: Ballindalloch
- Owner: Diageo
- Founded: 1869
- Status: Active
- Water source: The Craggan Burn
- No. of stills: 2 wash stills 2 spirit stills
- Capacity: 1,520,000 litres

Cragganmore distillery is a Scotch whisky distillery situated in the village of Ballindalloch in Banffshire, Scotland.

== History ==
The distillery was founded in 1869 by John Smith on land leased from Sir George Macpherson-Grant. The site was chosen by Smith both for its proximity to the waters of the Craggan burn and because it was close to the Strathspey Railway. The Strathspey Railway is now disused and forms the Speyside Way long-distance walking route. Smith was an experienced distiller, having already been manager of the Macallan, Glenlivet, Glenfarclas and Clydesdale in Wishaw distilleries. The distillery is taken over by John's brother George and then by John's son Gordon.

In 1923, after Gordon death, his widow Mary Jane takes over and finally sells it to the Cragganmore-Glenlivet Distillery Co., which is owned equally by Peter Mackie from White Horse and Ballindalloch Estate. Mackie sold his share to The Distillers Company but Macpherson-Grant family keeps its 50% ownership until 1965.

Cragganmore was marketed by United Distillers under their Classic Malts brand. in 1997, United Distillers, now renamed United Distillers & Vintners, become a part of Diageo.

== The Whisky ==
The stills used in the second distillation (the spirit still) of Cragganmore whisky are unique in having a flat top and being relatively short. The stills' shape has a definite effect on the taste and aroma (nose) of the whisky.

Laura Vernon is the current master distiller.

== Reactions to Cragganmore Whiskies ==
The San Francisco World Spirits competition has reacted favorably to the Cragganmore 10-year (Sherry Cask) and 12-year expressions, awarding the former with a double gold medal in 2005 and the latter with two double gold, one gold and three silver medals between 2005 and 2012. Wine Enthusiast, another spirit ratings organization, rated the 12-year in its 90-95 point interval and the 10-year Sherry Cask in its 96-100 point interval.

== See also ==
- Whisky
- List of whisky brands
- List of distilleries in Scotland
