= William Charles Winshaw =

William Charles Winshaw (1871-1968), was an American physician who created Stellenbosch Farmer's Winery (SFW) in South Africa in 1935. He was born in Kentucky, USA on 21 November 1871 and died in South Africa on 11 March 1968. He also co-owned the Oude Libertas vineyard there and produced Lieberstein, a dry white wine. He was married to Ada Charlotte (Day) and Susan Valerie

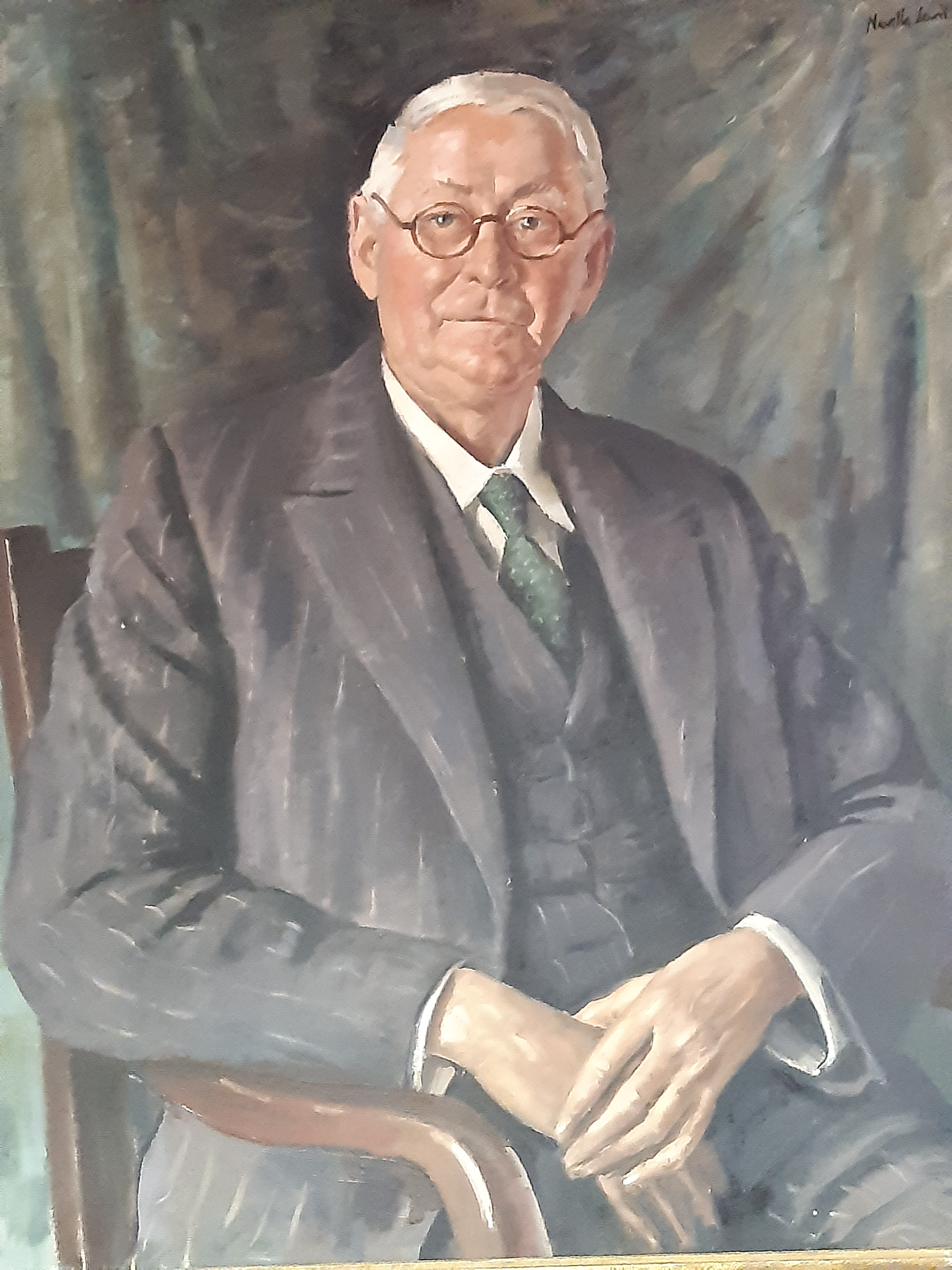
Winshaw portrait in a painting in Stellenbosch

SFW merged with Distillers Corporation on December 4, 2000 to form Distell Group Limited.

== See also ==
- South African wine
- List of wine personalities
