= Talisker distillery =

Island Single Malt Scotch whisky

Coordinates: 57°18′10″N 6°21′22″W

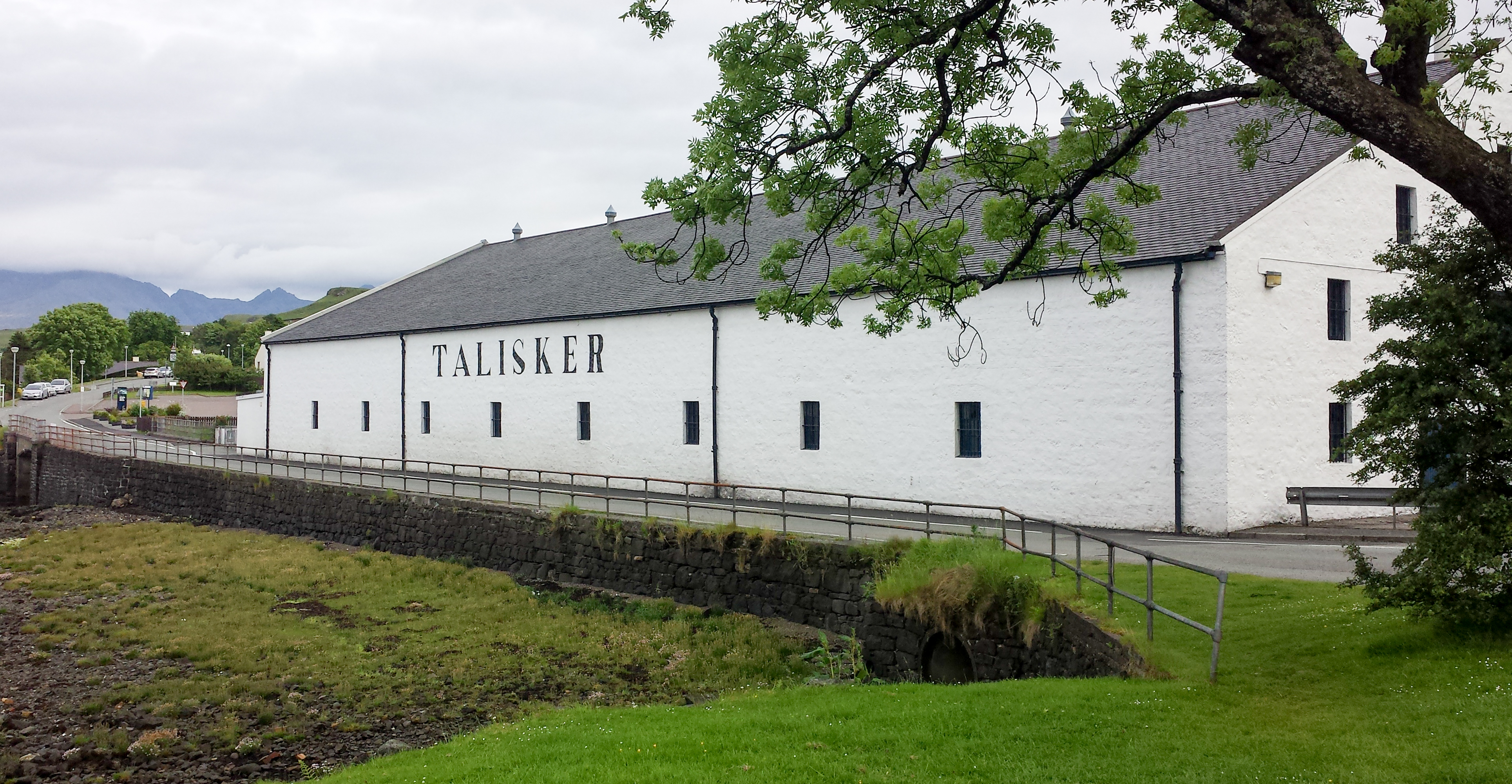

Region: Island
- Location: Carbost, Isle of Skye
- Owner: Diageo
- Founded: 1830
- Status: Active
- Water source: Carbost / Cnoc nan Speireag (Hawk Hill)
- No. of stills: 2 wash stills (10,000 L); 3 spirit stills (7,479 L)
- Capacity: 3,500,000 L

Talisker
- Age(s): 10 Years; 18 Years; 25 Years; 30 Years; 35 Years

Talisker distillery is an island single malt Scotch whisky distillery based in Carbost, Scotland on the Minginish Peninsula on the Isle of Skye.

The distillery is operated by Diageo and Taliskers’ 10 year old whisky has been nominated as part of their Classic Malts series. Whiskies attributed to the Talisker brand have been praised by whisky commentators such as Jim Murray.

In 1830 Hugh MacAskill leased the site from the MacLeods, having raised £3,000 and built the distillery. He chose to name it after his estate, Talisker (some 5 miles west), rather than the village in which it was located.

== History ==
After a number of false starts, the distillery was founded in 1830 by Hugh and Kenneth MacAskill. It opened at Carbost in 1831 after they acquired the lease of Talisker House from Clan MacLeod. In 1879, it was purchased for £1,810 (equivalent to £194,500 in 2025) by a firm which became known as R. Kemp & Co. when it had a production capacity of 700 gallons per week. The principal partner was A.G. Allan, Procurator-Fiscal for Elginshire. The other partner was Roderick Kemp, wine merchant of Elgin.

The distillery was rebuilt 1880–87 and extended in 1900. A new lease for the distillery was negotiated in 1892 with the chief of Clan MacLeod for an annual payment of £23.12s (equivalent to £2,593 in 2025) and a ten-gallon cask of best-quality Talisker. By 1894 the output was up to 2,000 gallons per week.

In 1895 the business was converted into a limited liability company with Thomas Mackenzie as managing partner, but the shares were not offered to the public. In 1925, after Mackenzie's death, Talisker was acquired by the Distillers Company.

On 12 August 1948 a fire broke out in the store of the distillery. No whisky was destroyed, but grain in store and over 100 empty barrels were lost.

The distillery was rebuilt again in 1960 after a stillhouse fire completely destroyed the distillery. The distillery operates five stills; two wash stills and three spirit stills. All the stills use worm tubs (condensing coils) rather than a modern condenser, which are believed to give the whisky a "fuller" flavour (itself an indication of higher sugar content). During this early period, the whisky was produced using a triple distilling method, but changed to the more conventional double distilling in 1928. After the 1960 fire, five exact replicas of the original stills were constructed to preserve the original Talisker flavour. In 1972 the stills were converted to steam heating and the maltings floor was demolished.

Distillers Limited Company (DLC) was renamed as United Distillers in 1987. In 1998 United Distillers was merged with International Distillers & Vintners to create United Distillers & Vintners, forming the spirits division of Diageo plc.

In 2024, Diageo proposed plans to redevelop the distillery to expand production, filing a proposal of application notice. The redevelopment was opposed in a public consultation As of December 2025, the plan had yet to be approved by the local council, and no firm investment plans were confirmed by the parent company.

=== Skye context ===
At its peak, Skye had seven registered distilleries and many illicit operations. Talisker is one of only two, alongside Torabhaig Distillery, as of 2026.

== Production ==
Talisker's water comes from springs directly above the distillery via a network of pipes and wells.

The malted barley used in production comes from Muir of Ord. Talisker has an unusual feature—swan neck lye pipes. A loop in the pipes takes the vapour from the stills to the worm tubs, which causes some of the alcohol to condense before it reaches the cooler. It then runs back into the stills and is distilled again. Talisker now has an annual output of three and a half million litres of spirit.

The spirit is most frequently matured in American oak casks. The malt is peated to a phenol level of approximately 18–22 parts per million (ppm), which is a medium peating level. Additionally, the water used for production, from Cnoc nan Speireag (Hawk Hill), flows over peat which adds additional complexity to the whisky.

The distillery began producing special bottlings of the whisky for connoisseurs in the early 2000s, with a 20- and 25-year bottling (where previously only a 10-year and 18-year were available). The 25-year bottling, despite being more expensive than the 20-year bottling, was distributed more widely.

In 2007 Talisker 18-year-old won "Best Single Malt In The World 2007" at the World Whiskies Awards. and in 2015 Talisker 10 Year Old won a Double Gold Medal and "Best Single Malt Scotch up to 12 years" in the San Francisco World Spirits Competition.

Talisker was the favourite whisky of writers Robert Louis Stevenson and HV Morton. In his poem "The Scotsman's Return From Abroad", Stevenson mentioned "The king o' drinks, as I conceive it, Talisker, Islay, or Glenlivet."

== Bottlings ==
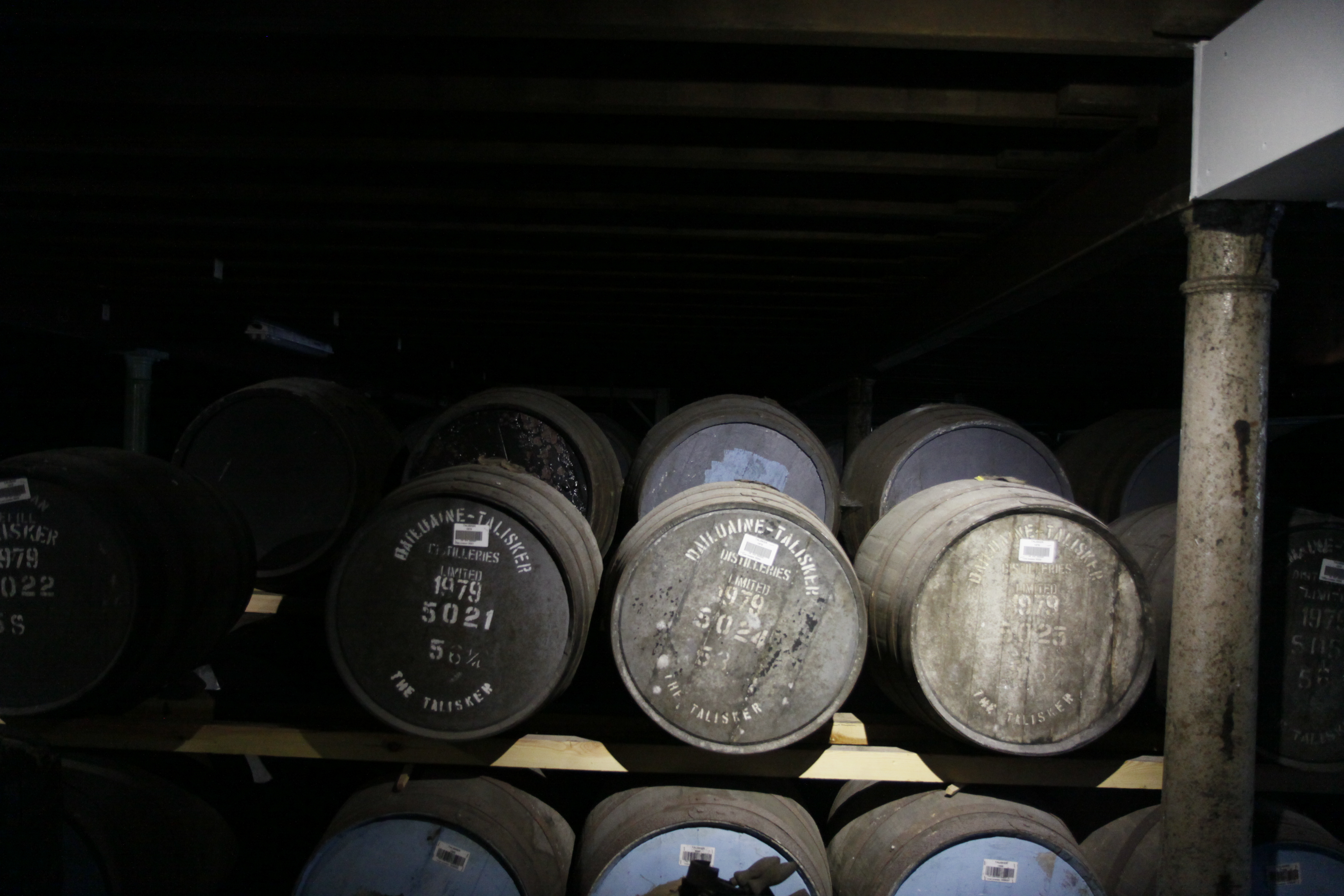
A look into the treasury with barrels, aged more than 35 years

- Talisker 10 Year Old
- Talisker Skye
- Talisker Storm
- Talisker Dark Storm
- Talisker 18 year Old (limited annual run)
- Talisker 25 year Old (limited annual run)
- Talisker 30 year Old (limited annual run)
- Talisker Distiller's edition (purchasable exclusively in the distillery)
- Talisker 57° North
- Talisker Port Ruighe
- Talisker Neist Point
- Talisker 8 Year Old Cask Strength (periodic release)
- Talisker The Wild Blue
- Talisker Wilder Seas (limited edition in cooperation with Parley for the Oceans)
- Talisker The Wild Explorador (limited diageo special release 2023)

== Reviews and accolades ==
Talisker whiskies have generally performed very well at international Spirit ratings competitions and have won some acclaim from liquor review organizations. The 10-, 18-, 25- and 30-year Taliskers have been awarded mostly gold medals from the San Francisco World Spirits Competition. The 10- and 18-year varieties, meanwhile, have received scores of 85-89 and 90-95 from Wine Enthusiast. Spirits ratings aggregator proof66.com, which averages scores from the San Francisco World Spirits Competition, Wine Enthusiast, and others, classifies Talisker's 10-year scotch in its highest ("Tier 1") performance category.

Talisker Distiller's Edition won Best Islands Single Malt at the 2013 World Whiskies Awards.

== Visitors ==
Talisker distillery attracts around 50,000 visitors each year.

=== Three Chimneys at Talisker ===
In 2024, Talisker opened a dining space on the grounds of the distillery, in collaboration with The Three Chimneys restaurant and hotel. It received 'Michelin Recommended’ status in 2026.

== See also ==
- List of whisky brands
- List of distilleries in Scotland
