= Clydesdale =

Clydesdale may refer to:

== Animals ==
- Clydesdale horse, a breed of horse originating in the county of that name
  - Budweiser Clydesdales, a group of Clydesdale horses used in Anheuser-Busch promotions
- Clydesdale Terrier, or Paisley Terrier, a breed of dog.

== Places ==
=== Scotland ===
- Clydesdale, or Lanarkshire, a traditional Scottish county.
- Clydesdale (district), former government district in Strathclyde, Scotland (1975–1996)
- Clydesdale (UK Parliament constituency), a former constituency of the House of Commons (1983–2005)
- Clydesdale (Scottish Parliament constituency)
- Used in the name of four wards of South Lanarkshire Council:
  - Clydesdale East (ward)
  - Clydesdale North (ward)
  - Clydesdale South (ward)
  - Clydesdale West (ward)

=== Elsewhere ===
- Clydesdale, Victoria, a locality in Australia
- Clydesdale, Nova Scotia, a community in Canada
- Clydesdale, KwaZulu-Natal, a town in Sisonke District Municipality in KwaZulu-Natal, South Africa

== Sports ==
- Clydesdale F.C., a former football club in Glasgow (1872–1881)
- Clydesdale RFC, Glasgow, a former rugby union club
- Clydesdale RFC, South Lanarkshire, a rugby union club
- Clydesdale Cricket Club, a cricket club in Glasgow
- Clydesdale Harriers, an athletics club in Clydebank
- Clydesdale Amateur Rowing Club, a rowing club in Glasgow
- Toowoomba Clydesdales, an Australian rugby league team that takes its name from the horse breed

== Businesses ==
- Clydesdale Bank
- Clydesdale (retailer), a defunct Scottish electrical retailer
- Clydesdale Junction Railway, former railway operator

== People ==
- Alec Clydesdale (1875–1947), Australian politician
- David T. Clydesdale (born 1954), American musician
- Marquess of Clydesdale, title of the eldest son of the Duke of Hamilton

== Other uses ==
- Clydesdale (1819 ship), built in Quebec, Canada
- Synod of Clydesdale, a Synod of the Church of Scotland
- The Clydesdale, an American alt country band
- Magnolia Dusty Clydesdale and Col. T. R. Clydesdale, fictional characters in the film The Apple Dumpling Gang
