= Sir John Muir, 1st Baronet =

Scottish merchant (1828–1903)

Arms of Sir John Muir, Bt

Sir John Muir, 1st Baronet DL JP (1828–1903) was a Scottish businessman who served as Lord Provost of Glasgow from 1889 to 1892. He founded Finlay Muir & Co, one of the world's largest 19th century companies.

== Life ==
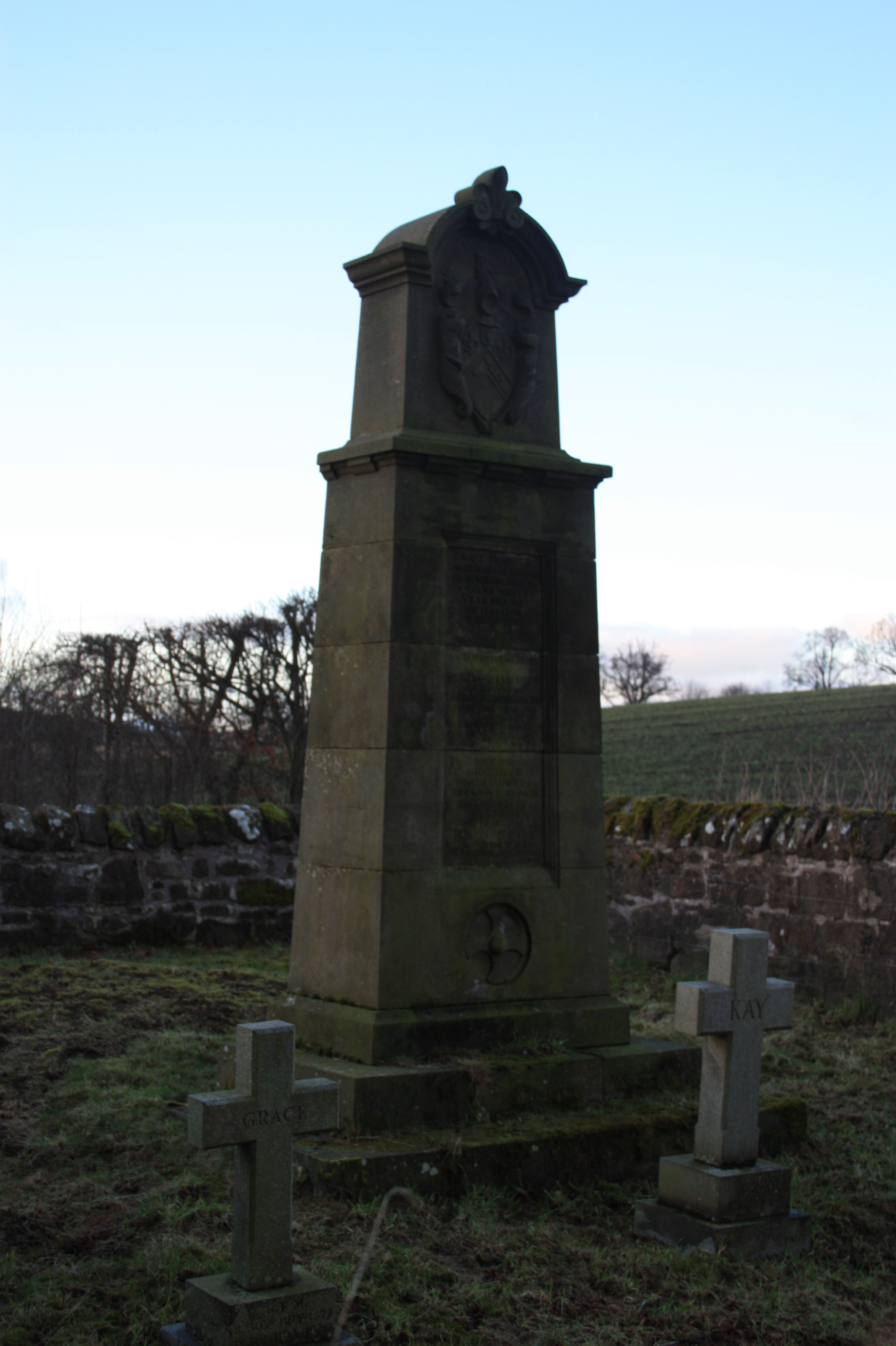
The grave of Sir John Muir of Deanston, Kincardine-in-Menteith

He was born on 8 December 1828, the son of James Muir (b.1801) and his wife, Elizabeth Brown.

In 1849 Muir joined James Finlay and Co. cotton mill owners. In 1861 he became a junior partner and after buying out other partners became sole partner in 1883. Due to the American Civil War the company had to relocate the main source of cotton to India in 1871. There, with his cousin Hugh Brown Muir, they established the firm of Finlay Muir & Co. In 1882, due to the Indian connection, they branched into tea plantations, and from there into rubber and jute. He became the major world stakeholder in tea growing and packing.

They also acquired plantations in Sri Lanka. By the end of the 19th century they controlled 270,000 acres, 77,000 of which were tea plantations.

The company's Indian headquarters were at Dalhousie Square in Calcutta, alongside the government buildings. The main production building was at Lyons Range next to the Calcutta Stock Exchange.

Muir was elected Lord Provost of Glasgow in 1889 and created a baronet by Queen Victoria in October 1892, his final year in office. He was succeeded as Lord Provost by Sir James Bell. He was appointed Honorary Colonel of the 4th Volunteer Battalion, Cameronians (Scottish Rifles) in 1891.

In 1900 he lived at 6 Park Gardens, a grand three storey basement and attic terraced townhouse in Glasgow near Kelvingrove Park, and also had his country property, Deanston House in Perthshire. The Deanston property linked to Deanston Mill, one of the largest cotton mills in Scotland, employing 1000 people (now converted to a whisky distillery).

By his final years Finlay Muir & Co had 90,000 employees worldwide, one of the largest companies ever. Approximately 70,000 were in the Indian subcontinent.

Muir died on 6 August 1903. He is buried in the remote rural burial ground of Kincardine-in Menteith, south-east of Deanston and west of Blair Drummond. The grave lies in a private enclosure accessed from a field to the north. The enclosure attaches to the north-west corner of the burial ground.

Finlay Muir had tea-trading premises in Glasgow until 2007.

== Family ==
Muir married Margaret Morrison Kay (d.1929). They had ten children, the first six being girls, then four sons.

The baronetcy passed to the eldest son, Sir Alexander Kay Muir (1868-1951).

== Artistic recognition ==
He was portrayed in 1889 by Sir John Lavery.

He was further portrayed in office by Joseph Henderson.

Baronetage of the United Kingdom
New creation	Baronet (of Deanston and Park Gardens, Glasgow); 1892 – 1903	Succeeded by Alexander Kay Muir
