= Talisker =

Coordinates: 57.283°N 6.45°W

Talisker: Scottish Gaelic: Talasgair
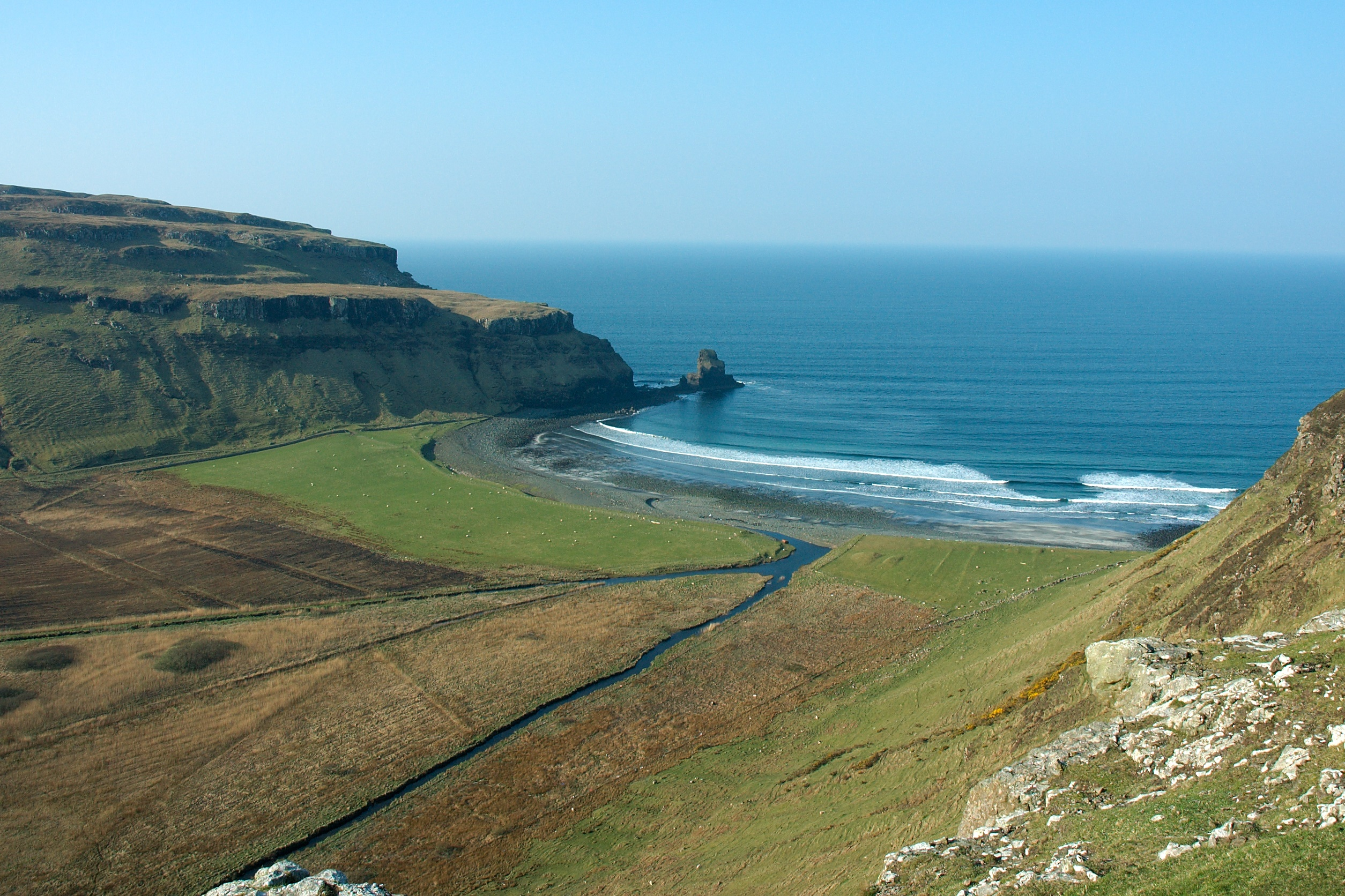
- Talisker Bay

- Location within the Isle of Skye
- OS grid reference: NG3230
- Council area: Highland
- Lieutenancy area: Ross and Cromarty
- Country: Scotland
- Sovereign state: United Kingdom
- Post town: ISLE OF SKYE
- Postcode district: IV47
- Dialling code: 01478
- Police: Scotland
- Fire: Scottish
- Ambulance: Scottish
- UK Parliament: Inverness, Skye and West Ross-shire
- Scottish Parliament: Ross, Skye and Inverness West

Talisker (Scottish Gaelic: Talasgair) is a settlement on the Minginish peninsula in the Isle of Skye, Scotland.

== History ==
Talisker was for centuries a possession of the Clan Macleod. For nearly two hundred years it was associated with a cadet branch of the chiefly line, founded by Sir Roderick Macleod, 1st of Talisker (1606-1675). Sir Roderick was the second son of Rory Mor Macleod (d.1626) and Isabel, daughter of Donald Macdonell, 8th of Glengarry. Along with his brother, Sir Norman Macleod of Bernera, he was knighted in 1661 for his services to the royalist cause. He married first a daughter of Lord Reay and secondly Mary, daughter of Lachlan Og Mackinnon of Mackinnon.

John Macleod, 2nd of Talisker, who died in about 1700 was the subject of an elegy, Cumha do Fhear Thalasgair (“Lament for the Laird of Talisker”), written by the blind harpist, Ruaidhri Dall MacMhurich.

Johnson and Boswell visited Talisker in 1773. Johnson’s Journey reveals him to have been impressed by his host, Talisker’s then tacksman, John Macleod, 4th of Talisker, but less so by the location itself:

...our next stage was to Talisker, the house of colonel Macleod, an officer in the Dutch service, who in this time of universal peace, has for several years been permitted to be absent from his regiment. Having been bred to physick, he is consequently a scholar, and his lady, by accompanying him in his different places of residence, is become skilful in several languages. Talisker is the place beyond all that I have seen, from which the gay and the jovial seem utterly excluded; and where the hermit might expect to grow old in meditation, without possibility of disturbance or interruption. It is situated very near the sea, but upon a coast where no vessel lands but when it is driven by a tempest on the rocks. Towards the land are lofty hills streaming with waterfalls. The garden is sheltered by firs, or pines, which grow there so prosperously, that some, which the present inhabitant planted, are very high and thick.

Boswell’s own Journal confirms Johnson’s description in its physical essentials, but concludes more charitably that “Talisker is a better place than one commonly finds in Sky”.

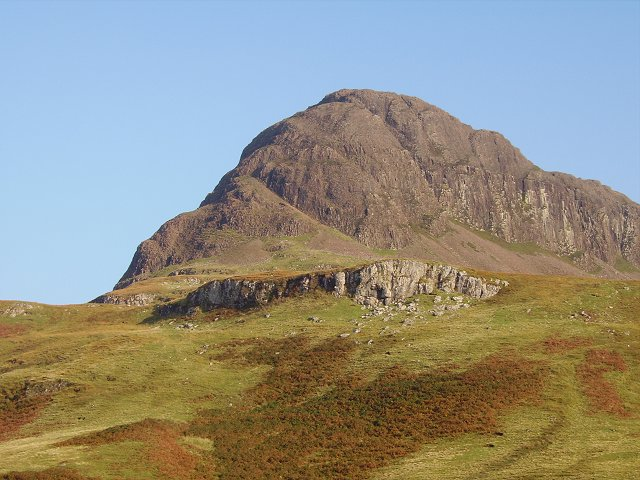
Preshal More overlooks Talisker from the south

In 1820 Donald Macleod, 6th of Talisker, a major in the 56th Regiment, sold his interest in Talisker and emigrated to Van Diemen’s Land (financed by his father-in-law, Alexander Maclean of Coll). He travelled with 36 Highlanders of his connection and secured a grant of 2,000 acres (800 hectares).

In 1825, Hugh MacAskill took over the Talisker estate and completed the clearance process begun under his predecessor. Five years later, he founded the Talisker distillery, which is in fact located some 5 miles (8 kilometres) away from Talisker at Carbost, Loch Harport. MacAskill gave up his lease of the Talisker lands in 1849.

== Geology ==
The estate includes two hills (Preshal More, which was climbed by Boswell, and Preshal Beg) of considerable geological interest. As described by B.R.Bell and I.T.Williamson:

At the base of the twin summits of Preshal More and Preshal Beg, near Talisker, the laterally-restricted Preshal Beg Conglomerate Formation crops out. These heterogebeous sedimentary rocks include debris flow (?lahars), alluvial fan and fluviolacustrine facies volcanoclastic deposits accumulated with a substantial and long-lived valley drainage system which developed upon the Glen Oraid Lava Formation surface. Subsequently this topography was inundated by two thick (at least 120 m or 390 ft) intracanvon flows of compositionally distinctive tholeiitic basalt belonging to the Talisker Lava Formation. These flows mark a significant change in the chemical signature of the lava sequence and have a strong compositional affinity with the various intrusive units of the Cuillin Centre. … the Preshal More flows may represent the only remnants of an originally significant lava shield that developed above the Cuillin centre.

== Site of Special Scientific Interest ==
NatureScot has designated Talisker as a Site of Special Scientific Interest. The designation is based in part on Talisker's geological features (described above), but in part also on the presence of two rare species of Zygaenidae, the Talisker burnet moth and the transparent burnet moth.

== Literature ==
Sorley Maclean's poem Tràighean (from Dàin do Eimhir) begins with a powerful evocation of the physical features of Talisker:

Nan robh sinn an Talasgar air an tràigh
far a bheil am beul mòr bàn
a' fosgladh eadar dà ghiall chruaidh,
Rubha nan Clach 's am Bioda Ruadh,
sheasainn-sa ri taobh na mara
ag ùrachadh gaoil 'nam anam
fhad ‘s a bhiodh an cuan a'lìonadh
camas Thalasgair gu sìorraidh:
sheasainn an siud air lom na tràghad
gu 'n cromadh Priseal a cheann àigich.

If we were in Talisker on the shore
where the great white mouth
opens between two hard jaws,
Rubha nan Clach and the Bioda Ruadh,
I would stand beside the sea
renewing love in my spirit
while the ocean was filling
Talisker bay forever:
I would stand there on the bareness of the shore
until Prishal bowed his stallion head.

== Present day ==
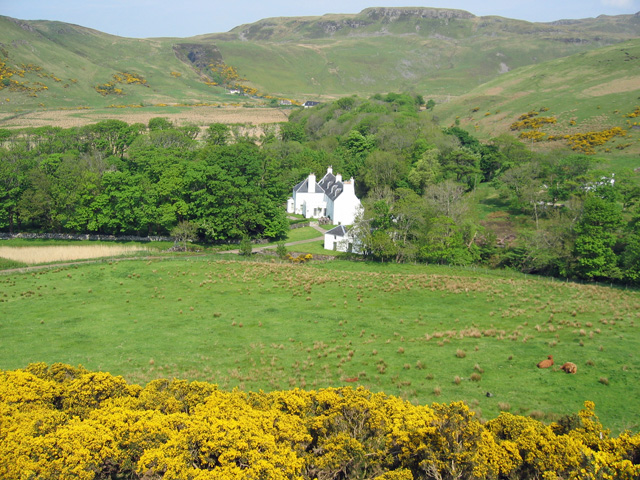
Talisker House

Talisker Farm now extends to 2,475 acres (1,002 hectares). The house, a handsome Georgian mansion, stands among old trees, just to the west of its 17th-century predecessor. Begun in 1717, it was much extended in the 18th and 19th centuries. It has been listed since 1971 with the following description:

It has an early-18th-century core with later additions; harled, ashlar dressings. It has two storeys and attic, 6 wide bays; 2-bay piended projecting wing to front (west) elevation with porch in left re-entrant, a single-storey addition with 5 long multi-pane windows in right re-entrant and bow window to centre of wing; it has crenellated parapets, 5 piended dormers with decoratively carved wood jambs; 2 stair windows to rear; 12-pane and lying pane glazing; end and ridge stacks; slate roof. Interior: projecting front wing (circa 1780) contains dining room at ground floor and drawing room above. Original ornate plaster ceiling in drawing room. Dining room plaster ceiling dates from 1865, when the bow window was added.

The shore is accessible by foot-path and is a popular destination for walkers:

Talisker Bay is a beautiful beach of stones and sand, best visited at low tide. There is both black and white sand on the beach, often mottled together to create patterns. The northern side of the bay is hemmed in by vertical cliffs and an impressive waterfall, whilst the southern side is closed off no less impressively by a great sea stack.
