= Isle of Raasay distillery =

Scotch whisky distillery in Northwest Scotland

Coordinates: 57.35183°N 6.07382°W

Isle of Raasay Distillery

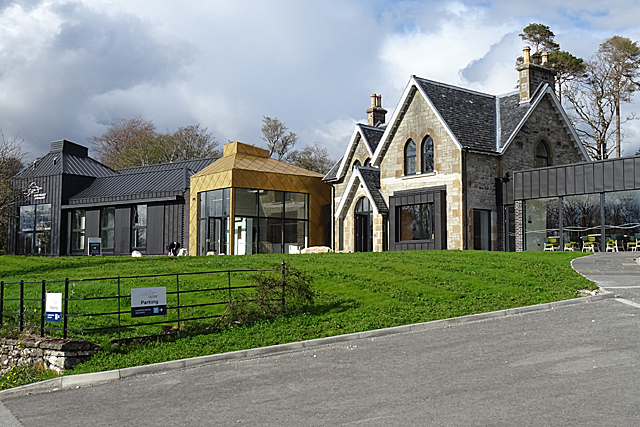

Region: Island
- Location: Isle of Raasay, Scotland
- Owner: R&B Distillers
- Founded: 2014
- Founder: Bill Dobbie & Alasdair Day
- Water source: Tobar na ba baine spring and borehole
- No. of stills: 1 wash still 1 spirit still
- Capacity: 940,000 L (210,000 imp gal; 250,000 US gal)
- Website: www.raasaydistillery.com

Isle of Raasay Distillery is a Scotch whisky and gin distillery on the Inner Hebridean Isle of Raasay, Scotland. The distillery is owned by R&B Distillers and was the first legal distillery on the Isle of Raasay when it opened in 2017.

== Production ==
R&B Distillers was founded in 2014 by Bill Dobbie and Alasdair Day. The company started its operations at the Isle of Raasay in September 2017 after receiving its distiller's licence. The water used during the distilling process comes from a Celtic Iron Age well. The water has a high mineral content derived from the island's volcanic and sandstone rock.

The whisky is distilled in copper pot stills and is matured at the distillery on Raasay in a variety of oak casks. The distillery will produce approximately 200,000 litres of pure alcohol per year. The distillery's flagship brand is Isle of Raasay Single Malt Scotch Whisky released since 2020. Since then, the distillery has also released a number of limited special and single cask whiskies.

== Location and visitor centre ==
The distillery is based on the site of a former disused hotel called Borodale House on the southwest of the island. The Isle of Raasay Distillery also has a visitors’ centre that opened in January 2018. It was awarded 5 stars by VisitScotland as a tourist attraction in June 2018. The distillery also features a six–bedroom hotel with views over the Isle of Skye. In 2023, the distillery ranked third in a Cask Connoisseur ranking of the most popular whisky distilleries.

In 2025, the distillery launched its visitor accommodation, incorporating five luxury cabins called Na Bothain, and six guest bedrooms inside the distillery itself.

== Products ==
The first bottlings to carry the Raasay name were the While We Wait expressions, a series of five independently bottled single malt whiskies that would indicate the future style of the distillery. The first of these whiskies was released in 2017; the last in 2020. The final While We Wait release was subtitled Last Orders, in reference to the discontinuation of the brand.

The first single malt to be distilled at Raasay distillery was released in September 2020, as a run of 7500 bottles. The whisky was matured in Tennessee whisky casks and finished in Bordeaux wine casks. In 2025, a limited edition whisky was released in support of Skye Live Festival.

In addition to whisky, the distillery also make Isle of Raasay gin. The gin uses ten botanicals, including rhubarb root and cubeb pepper. It was launched in July 2019, pre-dating the first whisky release from the company. The gin uses water from the distillery's historic onsite well, Tobar na Ba Bàine.

== Awards ==
- IWSC 2016 Silver, ISC 2016 Bronze, HKIWSC 2016 Bronze
- ISC 2017 Bronze
- IWSC Silver 2018
- IWSC Silver 2016 for Raasay While We Wait Second Release
- World Whiskies Awards 2018 Best Scotch Grain

== See also ==
- List of distilleries in Scotland
