= James Tod of Deanston =

Scottish lawyer, antiquary, and landowner

James Tod of Deanston and Hope Park WS FRSE (c.1795–1858) was a 19th-century Scottish lawyer, antiquary and landowner.

== Life ==
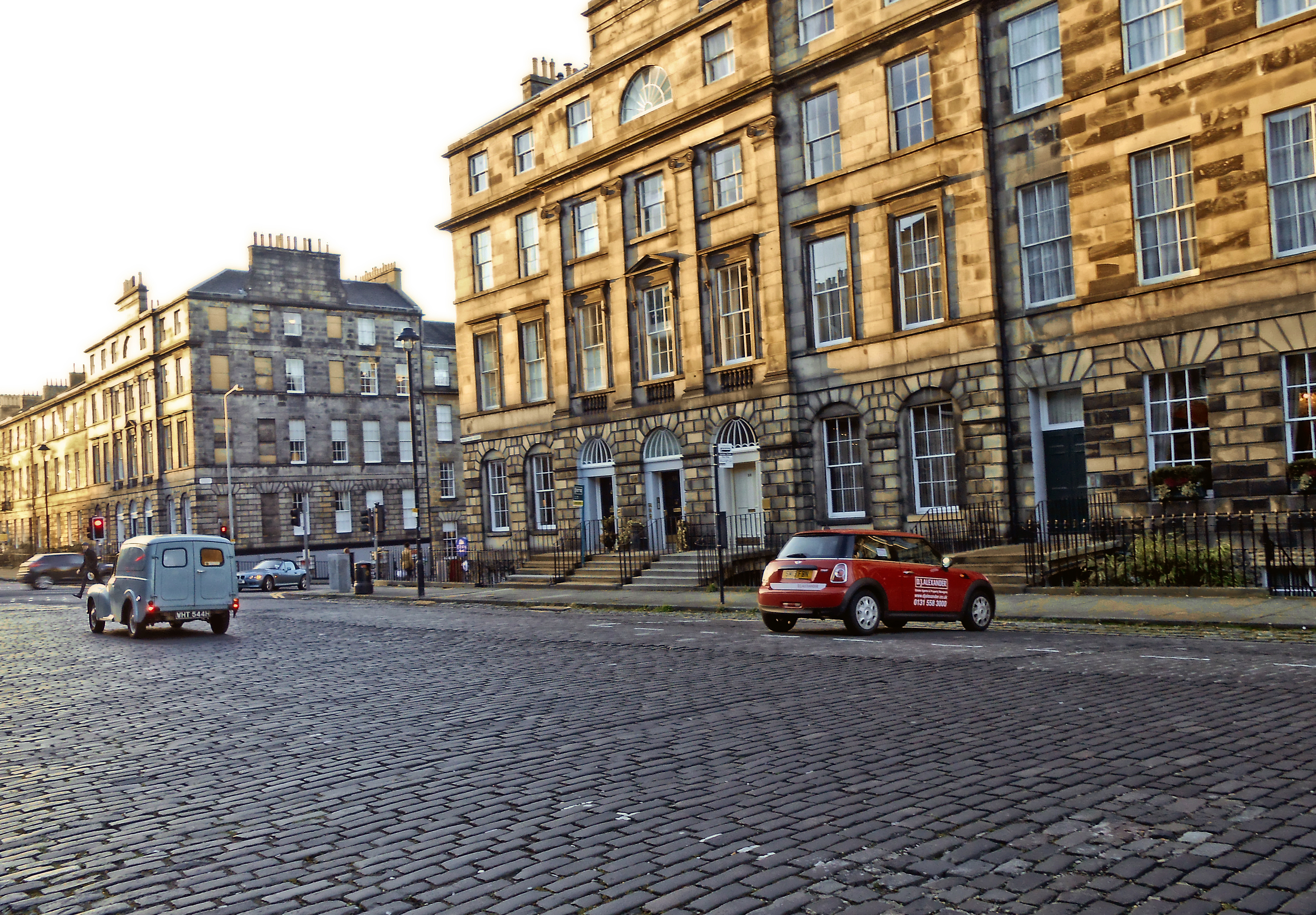
Great King Street, Edinburgh

He was born around 1795 the eldest son of James Tod of Hope Park, on the south-east side of the Meadows, Edinburgh.

His mother was living as a widow at Hope Park in south Edinburgh in 1813/14.

He was apprenticed to David Wemyss WS from around 1811. The office was at 55 George Street in Edinburgh's First New Town.

He qualified as a Writer to the Signet in 1820. He then set up his own offices at 21 Dublin Street.

Around 1830 he acquired the large estate of Deanston west of Stirling.

In 1848 he was elected a Fellow of the Royal Society of Edinburgh. His proposers was James David Forbes.

By 1855 he was living in a huge Georgian townhouse at 55 Great King Street in Edinburgh's Second New Town.

He died on 26 March 1858.

== Recognition ==
The name of Hope Park survives in the street-names Hope Park Terrace and Hope Park Crescent.

== Artistic recognition ==
His photograph (an early calotype of 1844 by Hill & Adamson) is held by the Scottish National Portrait Gallery.

== Family ==
In 1830 he married Susan Mercer, daughter of James Mercer of Scotsbank. Her brother Robert Mercer married Elizabeth Scott-Moncrieff (1802-1871), daughter of Very Rev Henry Moncrieff of Tullibole Castle near Fossoway.
