= Deanston =

Coordinates: 56.1899°N 4.0739°W

Deanston: Scottish Gaelic: Baile an Deadhain
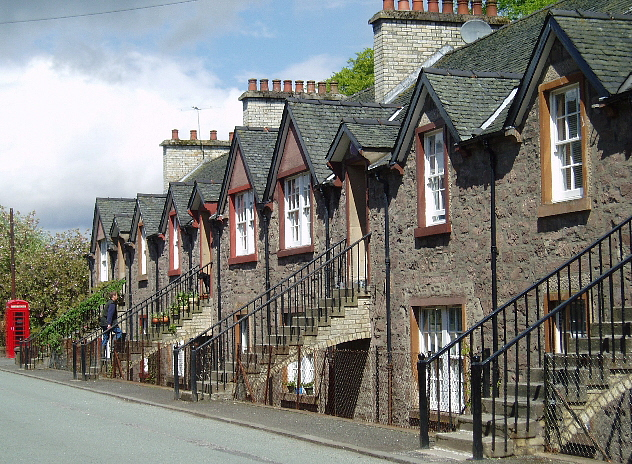
- Mill workers' houses, Deanston

- Location within the Stirling council area
- OS grid reference: NN713016
- Civil parish: Kilmadock
- Council area: Stirling
- Lieutenancy area: Stirling and Falkirk
- Country: Scotland
- Sovereign state: United Kingdom
- Post town: DOUNE
- Postcode district: FK16
- Dialling code: 01786
- Police: Scotland
- Fire: Scottish
- Ambulance: Scottish
- UK Parliament: Stirling and Strathallan
- Scottish Parliament: Stirling

Deanston (Scottish Gaelic: Baile an Deadhain) is a village in the Stirling council area, Scotland, on the south bank of the River Teith east of Doune, in south-west Perthshire. It is a part of the parish of Kilmadock.

== Etymology ==
The name comes from Walter Drummond, Dean of Dunblane in 1500, originally called Deans Town. After his appointment as Dean of Dunblane, he acquired the lands now known as Deanston from the Haldanes of Gleneagles.

== Deanston mill ==
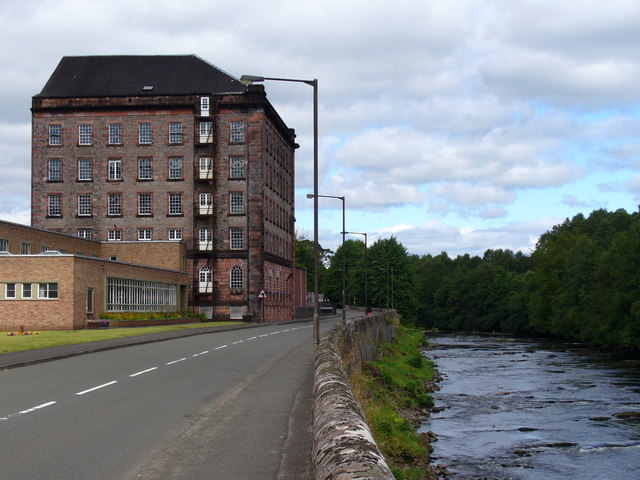
Deanston Distillery and the River Teith

Deanston Cotton Mill was built by the Buchanan brothers of Carston, Killearn near Glasgow, in 1785, and utilised the River Teith to power the mill. In 1808 James Finlay & Co bought and developed the mill, including the construction of a 1,500-yard-long (1,400-metre) Lade. James Smith, manager of the mill from 1807, was a successful entrepreneur and inventor. He built unusually designed accommodation over four levels for his workforce, called the divisions, which was new in its day. At its peak, the mill had over 1000 workers and had the largest waterwheel in Europe, Hercules, with a diameter of 36 feet 6 inches (11.13 metres).

The cotton mill closed in 1965. On the site, the Deanston Distillery opened in 1966 and is owned by Burn Stewart Distillers Limited (part of Distell Group Limited), where it produces several megawatts for the National Grid (2007).

== Description and significance ==
Deanston is a Stirling Council Conservation Area, comprising not only the village but the mill / distillery buildings, Deanston House and grounds and the whole of the mill lade. All the buildings are Listed, varying from Grade A to C under the Scottish Listing system.

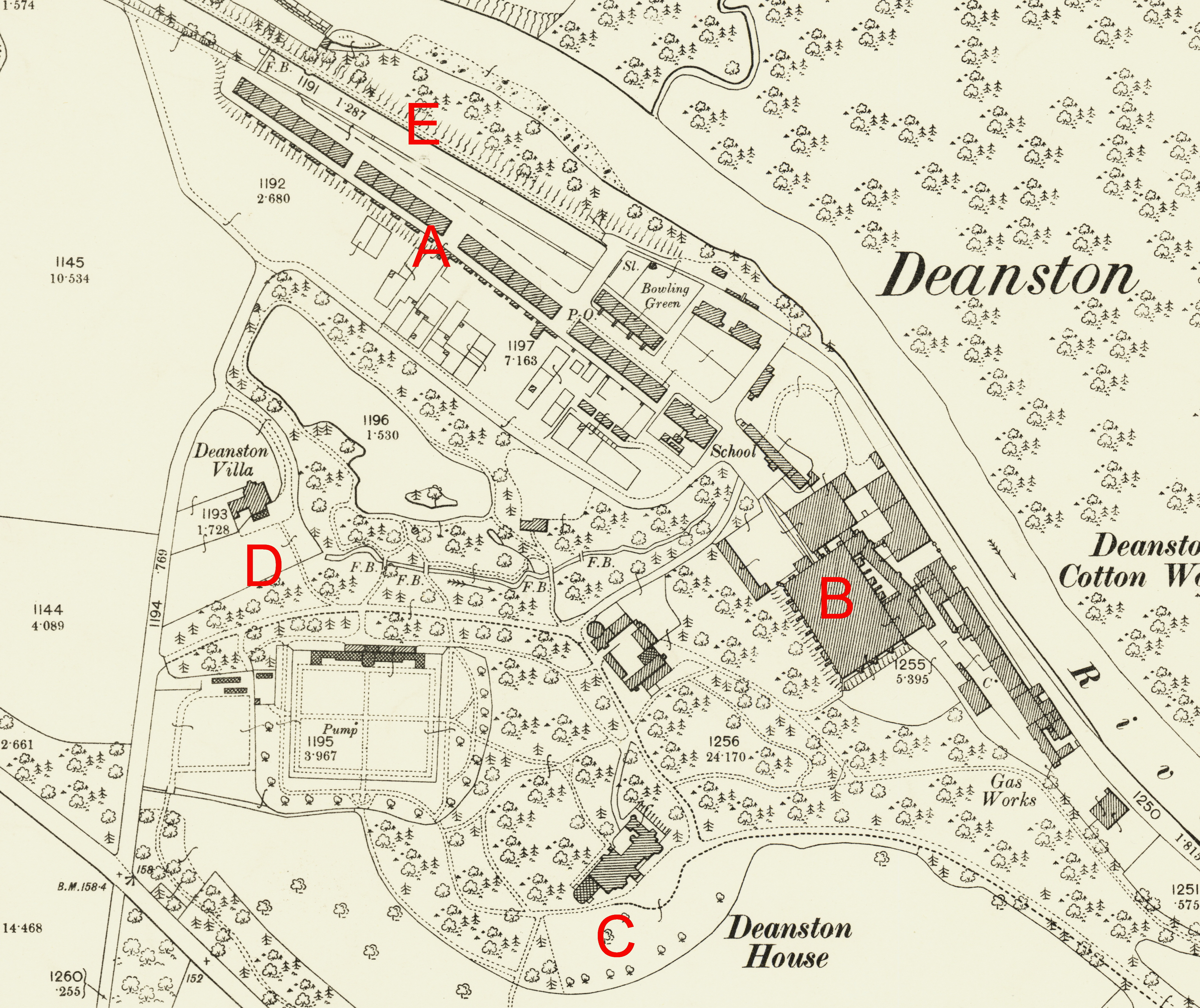
Deanston village, extract from OS map, Perth CXXV.13,1900, with features lettered A - E referred to in text. Published with acknowledgment to National Library of Scotland.

The village domestic housing (A – see plan) comprises essentially one long straight street, consisting of five blocks of terrace houses or ‘Divisions’ as they were known. This unusual arrangement probably reflects the nature of the site, a narrow flat terrace facing the River Teith with the land rising steeply behind. Nos 1 to 17 on the north side of the road were built circa 1811 for the mill overseers. On the south side of the road, the four blocks were built for the mill workers and their families, blocks 12 to 22 c. 1811 and the remaining blocks c.1820, thus all these buildings date to the Georgian era. The houses were on three floors, being reached in the case of the workers’ cottages by a common entrance passage. Despite their early date, the houses are only listed as [Scottish] Category C.

The Mill buildings (B) were commenced in 1785, but saw significant changes over the years, including a serious fire in 1796. The Spinning Mill (the large five storey building) was constructed 1830 – 31, the Weaving Shed c.1830, both Category A. The mill finally closed in 1965, but was re-opened the following year as a whisky distillery, hence all the buildings have been re-purposed. Evidence of some of the original functions still remain, for example the water wheel pits.

Deanston House (C) was built c.1820, but subsequently significantly extend in 1881–83. The grounds were extensive, again seeing considerable change over the years. Deanston Villa (D) built for the Mill Manager still stands, as do much of the walls of the original walled garden. Much of the former grounds to the west of the House have been given over to extensive C20 housing.

Perhaps the most extraordinary feature of the village is the 1.5 kilometre long mill lade (E - only part shown on plan), built circa 1826. This replaced an earlier shorter mill lade and was built to channel the waters of the River Teith to power a series of five large waterwheels. The open lade terminates 200 metres short of the Mill, continuing underground. It was evidently designing in this manner as the Ordnance Survey map of 1862, Sheet CXXV surveyed 1862, shows this.

The Significance of the village is that it is one of only a few Scottish planned villages founded in the Eighteenth Century based on fabric/cotton spinning, along with New Lanark (South Lanarkshire), Stanley (Perthshire) and Catrine (Ayrshire). This was apparently as a direct result of a mission by Richard Arkwright, the towering figure of the early Industrial Revolution, to set up cotton spinning factories in Scotland according to his principles. No single one of these four villages is any longer complete but together they provide a very full picture of how these villages were designed and operated.

== Notable people ==
Deanston has links to two Lord Provosts of Glasgow: Sir John Muir and Sir David Richmond.

Deanston is the birthplace of the pioneering documentary maker John Grierson after whom a street in the village is named. John Grierson built the first play-park in Deanston and his grandmother's ashes were scattered underneath the swings.

James Tod of Deanston WS FRSE laird off Deanston from around 1830 to 1858.
