= Island single malt =

Whisky produced on Scottish islands

Whisky producing regions of Scotland

Island single malts are single malt Scotch whiskies produced on the islands around the perimeter of the Scottish mainland. The islands (excluding Islay) are not recognised in the Scotch Whisky Regulations as a distinct whisky producing region, but are considered part of the Highland region. Islay is recognised as a distinct whisky producing region (see Islay whisky).

Other sources contend that the Islands, excluding Islay, constitute a sixth distinct region. This unofficial region includes the whisky-producing islands of Arran, Jura, Mull, Orkney, and Skye, with their respective distilleries: Arran, Jura, Tobermory, Highland Park, Scapa, Talisker and Torabhaig.

Island single malts are very varied and have few similarities, but are distinguished from other whisky regions by a smokier flavour with peaty undertones. One source states that the flavour depends on peat, the use of which varies widely between distillers.

== Island malt distilleries ==
- Abhainn Dearg distillery, on Lewis
- Arran distillery, on Arran
- Harris distillery, on Harris
- Highland Park distillery, in Orkney
- Isle of Raasay distillery, on Raasay
- Jura distillery, on Jura
- Saxa Vord distillery, on Unst
- Scapa distillery, in Orkney
- Talisker distillery, on Skye
- Tobermory distillery, on Mull, producing Tobermory and Ledaig
- Torabhaig distillery, on Skye

=== In development ===
- Isle of Barra distillery, on Barra
- Orkney distillery, on Orkney
- Lerwick distillery, on Shetland.

== See also ==
- List of whisky distilleries in Scotland
