= Distell =

Multinational brewing and beverage company

Distell Group Limited
- Type: Public limited company
- Traded as: JSE: DGH
- Industry: Brewing, Beverage
- Predecessor: Stellenbosch Farmers' Winery; Distillers Corporation
- Founded: 4 December 2000; 25 years ago through Merger
- Founder: William Charles Winshaw; SFW's Founder; Anton Rupert; Distillers Corp's Founder
- Defunct: April 26, 2023; 3 years ago
- Fate: Carved-out
- Successor: Heineken Beverages
- Headquarters: Stellenbosch, South Africa
- Key people: Richard Rushton - CEO
- Revenue: ZAR 17.7 Billion (2014) The shareholding as at 31 March 2014 is shown below:
- Net income: ZAR 1.5 Billion
- Total assets: ZAR 15.9 Billion (2014)
- Number of employees: 5,300 (2014)
- Website: www.distell.co.za

Distell Group Limited, commonly referred to as Distell, was a multinational brewing and beverage company, based in South Africa. On April 26, 2023, Distell was acquired by Heineken. After that, its operations were integrated into Heineken Beverages, a company created by the merger of its South African unit, Distell, and the African brewery acquired by the Dutch multinational Namibia Breweries.

== Overview ==
Distell Group Limited is a producer and marketer of spirits, fine wines, ciders and ready-to-drinks. The group's headquarters are in Stellenbosch, South Africa.

As at February 2014, Distell had 5,300 employees worldwide and an annual turnover of ZAR 17.7 Billion.

== History ==
Distell Group Limited traces its roots to two major alcoholic beverage companies in South Africa, Stellenbosch Farmers' Winery (SFW) and Distillers Corporation, that merged on 4 December 2000.

=== Merger ===
==== Stellenbosch Farmers' Winery ====
Stellenbosch Farmers Winery Group (SFW) the founder member of Distell Group was formed in 1925 by William Charles Winshaw, an American medical doctor. As at the year 2000, SFW produced and distributed wine and spirits as well as non-alcoholic beverages through retail outlets South Africa and across the world.

In 1956 Stellenbosch Farmers Winery Ltd was listed on the Johannesburg Stock Exchange.

==== Distillers Corporation ====
Distillers Corporation was formed in 1945 by Anton Rupert. Distillers expanded energetically and very quickly set up marketing relationships and partnerships in the wine and spirits industry. The company became a major producer, focusing on distillates and in particular on the brandy market that it developed from relative obscurity to its current level of prominence. It is renowned for its Bergkelder concept, a marketing innovation that invited wine estates to make use of Distillers' bottling, sales and marketing. In addition, it created Amarula Cream, which is one of the top-selling cream liqueurs in the world.

Distillers Corporation was also listed on the JSE.

==== Merger transaction ====
On 20 September 2000, Distillers' Corporation and Stellenbosch Farmers Winery directors announced the merger of the two firms. The merger was made possible because both firms had a similar shareholding structure i.e.

- Remgro-KWV Investments – 60% of Distillers' Corporation and a similar stake in SFW.
- Other Beverages Industries (Pty) Ltd – 30% of Distillers' Corporation and a similar stake in SFW. Other Beverage Interests Proprietary Limited is a wholly owned subsidiary of SABMiller.
- Public via The JSE – 10%

This structure allowed the merger not to have any diluting effect on the lead shareholders' effective interest in the merged entity.

On 4 December 2000, the management announced the conclusion of the merger. The newly formed entity was known as Distell from the names of the two constituent companies.

Distell Group's shares began trading on the Johannesburg Stock Exchange on 19 March 2001 under the symbol DST.

=== Post merger ===
In April 2013 Distell bought Scotch whisky company Burn Stewart Distillers from CL Financial for £160m.

Following its acquisition of SABMiller, Anheuser-Busch InBev announced that it would sell its 26.4% acquired state in Distell Group to Public Investment Corporation.

=== Announced acquisition ===
On 15 November 2021, Heineken announced a plan to buy Distell Group, in order to become the market-leading alcoholic beverage supplier in South Africa. The takeovers would be the first major deal for Heineken’s CEO and chairman of the executive board Dolf van den Brink, who took charge at Heineken in June 2020. The acquisition was completed in 2023

== Ownership ==
The stock of Distell Group Limited is listed on the JSE, where it trades under the symbol: DST. As of June 2015 shareholding in the group's stock is as depicted in the table below:

Distell Group Limited Stock Ownership
| Rank | Name of Owner | Percentage Ownership |
|---|---|---|
| 1 | Remgro-Capevin Investments Proprietary Limited | 53.00 |
| 2 | Other Beverage Interests Proprietary Limited | 26.50 |
| 3 | Others via the JSE | 20.50 |
| | Total | 100.00 |

- Remgro-Capevin Investments Proprietary Limited is a joint venture between Remgro Limited and Capevin Holdings. Each company has a 50% stake in the joint venture.
- Capevin Holdings is a JSE listed firm whose sole investment as at 30 June 2014 was an effective interest of 26.5% in the issued share capital of Distell Group Limited, held via its 50% interest in Remgro-Capevin Investments Proprietary Limited.
- Remgro Limited holds 15.6% shareholding in Capevin Holdings. That gives Remgro Limited 30.65% indirect control in Distell Group Limited.

== Brands ==
Distell's major brands include:

=== Spirit portfolio ===
- Klipdrift Export
- Richelieu
- Viceroy
- Mellow-Wood
- Oude Meester VSOB
- Commando
- Richelieu XO
- Underberg
- Amarula
- Nachtmusik
- Oude Meester Peppermint & Ginger Liqueurs
- Flight of the Fish Eagle
- Klipdrift Premium
- Van Ryn’s 10, 12, 15 and 20 year old collection
- Oude Meester Reserve
- Klipdrift Gold
- Nederburg Potstill Solera Brandy
- Collison's White Gold
- Richelieu 10
- Bain's Cape Mountain Whisky
- Black Bottle blended Scotch whisky
- Bunnahabhain Islay single malt Scotch whisky
- Deanston single malt Scotch whisky
- Harrier
- Knights
- Ledaig single malt Scotch whisky
- Scottish Leader
- Three Ships
- Tobermory single malt Scotch whisky
- Mainstay
- Seven Seas
- Amarula Gold

=== Wine portfolio ===
- Nederburg
- 4th Street
- 5th Avenue
- Cellar Cask
- Chateau Libertas
- Drostdy-Hof
- Graça
- Grand Mousseux
- Grunberger
- JC Le Roux
- Obikwa
- Peche Royale
- Two Oceans
- Alaska
- Brandyale
- Castle Brand
- Clubman
- Copperband
- Delgado Supremo
- Mokador
- Vincoco
- Zorba
- Autumn Harvest Crackling
- Capenheimer
- Kellerprinz
- Oom Tas
- Overmeer
- Paarle Perle
- Ship Sherry
- Sedgwicks Old Brown
- Tassenberg
- Taverna Rouge
- Witzenberg Stein
- Allesverloren
- Durbanville Hills
- Flat Roof Manor
- Fleur du Cap
- Hill & Dale
- Jacobsdal
- Lomond
- Monis
- Neethlingshof
- Place in the Sun
- Plaisir de Merle
- Pongracz
- RED ESCape
- Theuniskraal
- Tukulu
- Uitkyk
- Zonnebloem

=== Cider and ready to drink ===
- Hunters Dry
- Hunter Gold
- Savanna Dry
- Savanna Light
- Savanna Angry Lemon
- Savanna Alc Free
- Bernini
- Esprit
- Hunters Extreme
- Klipdrift & Cola
- Hunters Edge
- 4th Street

== See also ==
- William Charles Winshaw
- Stellenbosch Farmers' Winery v Distillers Corporation
- South African wine
- List of wineries in South Africa
- JSE Limited
- SABMiller
