= Cyril Duprey =

Trinidad and Tobago businessman

- Born: 3 March 1897; St. Joseph, Trinidad and Tobago
- Died: 1988 (aged 90–91)
- Occupation: Businessman
- Known for: Colonial Life Insurance Company (CLICO)
- Awards: OBE, 1956; Chaconia Medal (Gold), 1977; Trinity Cross, 1988

Cyril Lucius Duprey OBE (3 March 1897 – 1988) was a Trinidad and Tobago businessman. He founded the Colonial Life Insurance Company (CLICO, now part of the CL Financial Group) in 1936, the first locally owned insurance company. The company was expanded into the CL Financial Group, which was run for many years by his nephew, Lawrence Duprey. In 1956, Duprey appointed as an officer of the Order of the British Empire (OBE) and in 1977 he received Trinidad & Tobago's Chaconia Medal (Gold). His nephew is now the chairman of CL Financial.

According to some sources, Dupey was known for his personal business mission statement "Give a man value, give a man service and he will support you."

In the 1960s, Cyril Dupey became president of the Cooperative Bank of Trinidad and Tobago, president of the Building and Loan Association of Trinidad and Tobago, and a board member of E.B. Gibb, a trading company.

In 1988, Duprey was awarded the Trinity Cross, the highest national award of Trinidad and Tobago, for his contributions to local business and community development.

His biography, Duprey: The success story of Cyril L. Duprey and the Colonial Life Insurance Company by Owen Baptiste, was published in 1986.
