= Deanston distillery =

Scottish distillery

Coordinates: 56°11′21.4″N 4°4′17.1″W

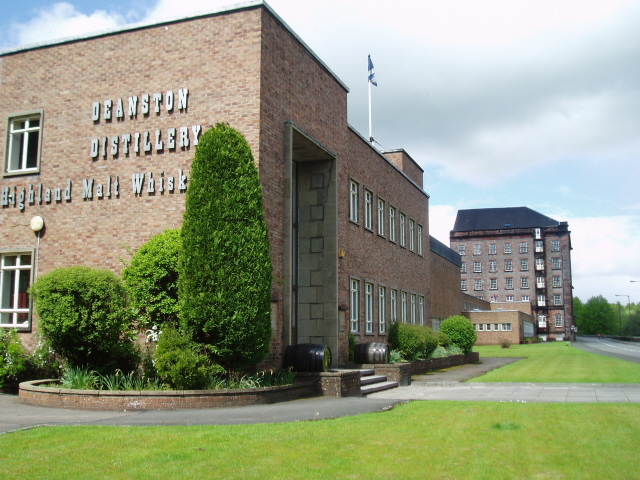

Region: Highland
- Location: Deanston, Perthshire
- Owner: CVH Spirits Limited
- Founded: 1965
- Status: active
- Water source: River Teith
- No. of stills: 2 wash stills 20.000l, 2 spirit stills 17.000l
- Capacity: 3,000,000 litres

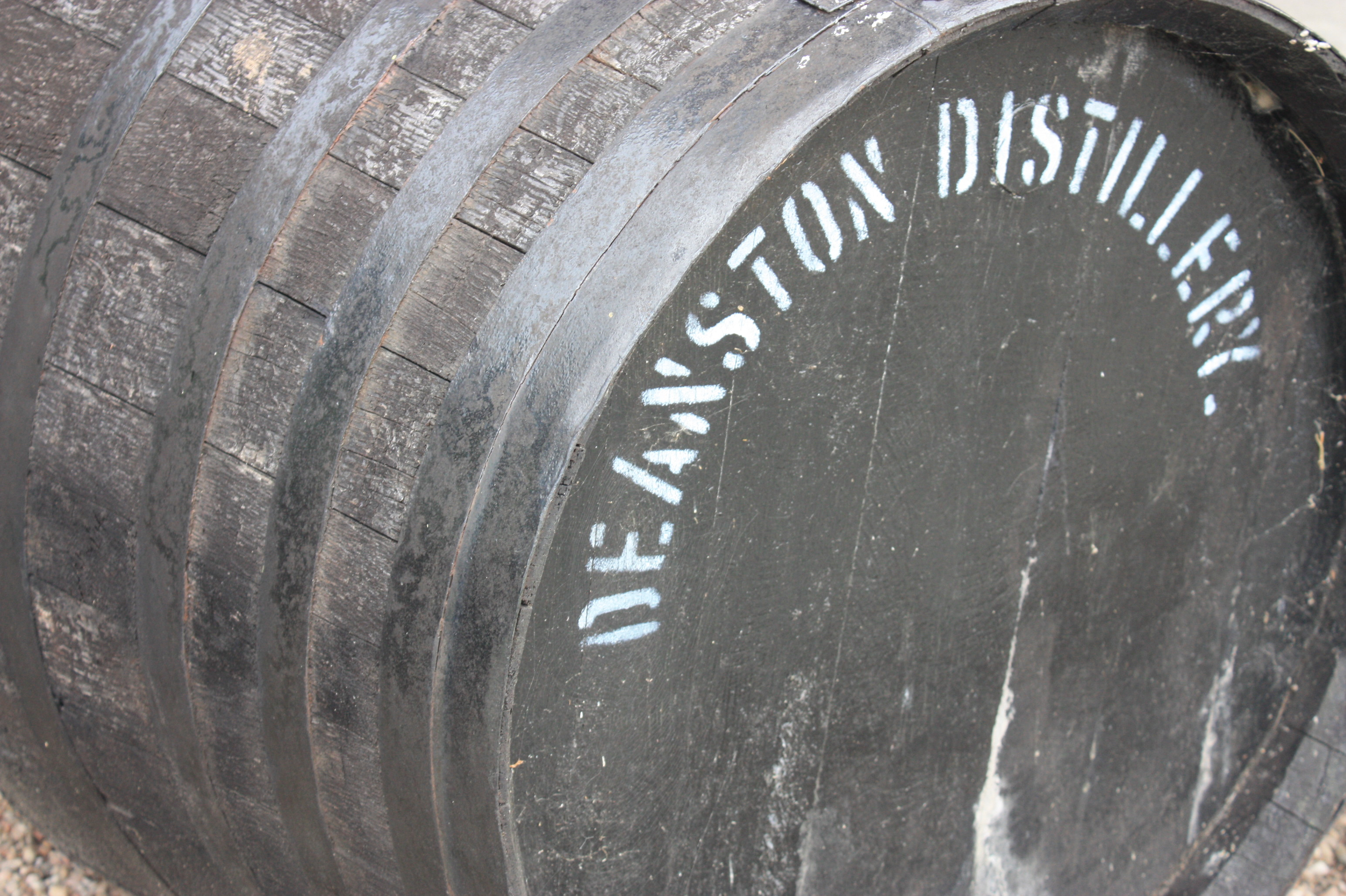
Deanston distillery barrel

Deanston distillery is a Single Malt Scotch whisky distillery and it is the largest distillery owned by Scotch whisky producer CVH Spirits Limited, who also own Bunnahabhain Distillery on the Isle of Islay and Tobermory distillery on the Isle of Mull. located on the banks of the River Teith, eight miles from the historic town of Stirling, at the gateway to the dramatic Loch Lomond & Trossachs National Park.

Deanston Distillery started life in 1785 as a cotton mill designed by Sir Richard Arkwright, and remained as such for 180 years until it was transformed into a distillery in 1966. The constant supply of pure water from the River Teith contributed to the decision to turn the mill into a distillery and Deanston is now the only distillery in Scotland to be self-sufficient in electricity, with power generated by an on-site hydro-energy facility. Deanston sits in the Highland single malt region of Scotland and produces whisky which is handmade by ten local craftsmen, un-chill filtered, natural colour and bottled at a strength of 46.3% ABV.

== History ==
Deanston first acquired its name in 1500, when Walter Drummond (the Dean of Dunblane) inherited the lands now known as Deanston from the Haldanes of Gleneagles. The Scots word ‘dean’ was coupled with the Scots term ‘toun’, meaning farm/settlement, to make Deanston.

Deanston was largely an agricultural area until John Buchanan and his brothers from Carston had the foresight to convert an existing flax mill into a water-powered carding and roving factory with the latest machinery. Designed by Arkwright, inventor of the water-powered spinning frame, the mill was opened in 1785 as the Adelphi Mill, after the Greek word adelphoi meaning ‘brothers’. The mill was powered by the River Teith and was one of the first half-dozen mills of this type to be built in Scotland.

Its opening signalled the start of a period of great change for Deanston, which was inhabited with Highlanders who had been evicted in the Clearances and were reluctant to work in the mill. After a difficult start, the mill's fortune was transformed by the arrival of Kirkman Finlay (of Glasgow merchants James Finlay & Co) and the vibrant James Smith, who was installed as manager in 1806/7, aged just seventeen, and remained at the helm for 35 years. Smith embarked on a massive modernisation of Deanston between 1811 and 1833, building a new spinning mill, a village, housing, roads, a new weir, new gas works, a large weaving shed, Deanston School, and a fish-ladder to give salmon access to the upper reaches of the river - the original model of which can be seen at the distillery today. His biggest innovation was the engineering works which built machinery for Catrine Mill, as well exporting to all parts of Britain and Europe. Smith's talents did not end with the modernisation of the mill, as he also became famous for his deep soil drainage system known as ‘Deanstonisation.’

== Innovation ==
In its early days, Deanston Mill was at the forefront of the Industrial Revolution in Scotland and developed a number of nationally important innovations which continue to impact the distillery today. Due to a shortage of currency at the time, Deanston was the first major industrial works to produce its own currency. The French Revolution and Napoleonic War meant that silver and gold were drained away to pay for hostilities and as a result, Deanston Mill countermarked Spanish and French coins and issued them to workers and suppliers as pay. Very few of these coins still exist, however one is currently on display at the distillery.

The mill and village houses were originally lit by candles and oil lamps but in 1813, Deanston Mill was lit by gas – said to be the first gasworks in the west of Scotland and ahead of Westminster Bridge, which was not lit until the end of December that year.

By 1833, Deanston was powered by four large water wheels - the first two small wheels were reconstructions of the original Adelphi Mill wheels and the third wheel was called Samson. The fourth wheel (named Hercules) measured 36 ft 6in in diameter, was of 300 horse power, and was the largest waterwheel in Europe and the second largest in the world. Original footage of these colossal wheels in operation was recently unearthed and can now be viewed at the distillery. The wheels were dismantled in 1949 and replaced by a more efficient hydro-turbine and steam electricity generating plant, which currently provides enough energy for all of the distillery's requirements, as well as producing a surplus which is sold back to the National Grid.

Deanston Mill was heavily influenced by Arkwright's classical style of architecture and this is a striking feature of the distillery today. The elegant 204 ft long, 136 ft wide vaulted warehouse, previously the weaving shed, is recognised to be one of the greatest surviving Regency industrial buildings in Scotland, and is now used to mature Deanston Single Malt whisky. Construction began in 1834; its remarkable cast-iron cupola roof was insulated with soil to bring it up to the best temperature for weaving cotton (80 degrees Fahrenheit) and also helped to deaden the noise of the hundreds of working looms inside. The soil on the roof was utilised as a community vegetable garden.

== Deanston Village ==
In a similar way to David Dale's model community at New Lanark, Deanston village was built by mill owners James Finlay & Co to provide housing for the workers. The first houses were erected in 1811 - common entrances gave way to self-contained apartments, with attics for drying clothes and storage, and good coal-burning ranges were provided. Nearly every able-bodied woman worked in the mill; therefore easily run homes were an investment for the company. A local school was provided and is still educating the future generation to this day. Young children attended school from age five and were expected to read and do sums before entering the mill when they were nine. Children between the ages of 13 and 16 attended an evening school four days a week. A communal washhouse, drapery, post office, savings bank and grocery shops were also built in Deanston. By 1844, the mill employed 1100 people, many of whom were women and children.

Little has changed in Deanston village since the days of the cotton mill. A large proportion of the village is currently listed, marking its special architectural and historic interest. The vaulted warehouse, weir, and old spinning mill are category A listed buildings, and Deanston School and the village cottages are category C listed. The distillery still keeps the river bank tidy, cuts the grass on behalf of the village, and is still very much an integral part of the Deanston community.

== Conversion ==
In 1841 James Smith retired from the mill. Operations continued but by 1848, production at Deanston was in decline. The turn of the twentieth century saw a further decrease in demand for cotton and the workforce was scaled down from 1500 to 500 people. Things steadily got worse until the mill was closed on 2 April 1965.

It was the collective efforts of James Finlay & Co, Brodie Hepburn & Co, and A.B (Sandy) Grant, known together as Deanston Distillers Ltd, who converted Deanston Mill into a malt whisky distillery in 1965. The soft, fast flow of the River Teith and a whisky boom in Scotland at the time made the site ideal for whisky production. The distillery was opened on 17 October 1966 after an extensive refurbishment costing £300,000, employing 20 local people, but taking just nine months. Three floors were removed to make room for four copper stills and a mash tun. The constant, cool temperature of the weaving shed made it ideal for whisky maturation. The only completely new building was the tun room – where eight huge fermentation vessels now stand. When full each of these weighs 60 tonnes and they stand on top of the mill's four tunnels leading from the turbine house back to the river.

The distillery was formally opened on 30 January 1967 by the actor Andrew Cruickshank, the star of the BBC's ‘Dr Finlay's Casebook’ series. Deanston started bottling in 1971 and the first single malt was named Old Bannockburn. Teith Mill, a blended whisky, was also produced at this time - a kiosk was set up at Blair Drummond Safari Park which sold Old Bannockburn and Teith Mill in take-away cartons. At this point, although it made business sense to sell Deanston as a single malt, it was mainly produced for blending purposes. In 1971, Invergordon Distillers (bought by Whyte & Mackay in 1990) bought Brodie Hepburn Ltd, with Tullibardine Distillery and a 30% share in Deanston Distillery. A year later, Invergordon purchased Deanston outright and the first single malt bearing the name Deanston was produced in 1974. After a downturn in the whisky industry, Deanston Distillery ceased production in 1982 for eight years, before being purchased by current owners Burn Stewart Distillers Limited in 1990 (now part of CVH Spirits Limited).

== Visitor Centre ==
In June 2012, Burn Stewart Distillers opened a new visitor centre at Deanston. The visitor centre is located in the former cotton mill canteen, with many original features being retained, and created seven new jobs for local people. It hosts a gift shop which sells exclusive Deanston bottlings, a café, tasting and presentations areas, and a variety of intimate distillery and tasting tours.

As the visitor centre opened, the distillery and a number of staff had already attracted international attention as Deanston featured as the distillery location in the Ken Loach film, The Angels' Share, released in May 2012. One of the stars of the film, Jasmin Riggins, was also present at the opening.

== Production and character ==
Deanston Distillery looks very unlike a traditional Scotch whisky distillery and has a number of unique production features which contribute to its distinct character in taste and look. The spirit is handmade by a small team of local craftsmen who rely on traditional distilling techniques; no technology or computers are used. Deanston uses only Scottish-grown barley and in 2000, was one of the first distilleries in Scotland to start producing organic whisky, certified by the Organic Food Federation and using barley grown in specially selected sites, free from pesticides and chemicals. The distillery also uses an 11-ton open-topped mash tun - the only one of its size in Scotland - and four unique pot stills with upwards sloping lyne arms and boiling balls, which help give the whisky its light character. The spirit is matured in the original weaving shed built in the 1830s, which holds a capacity of 24,000 casks.
