= Black Bottle =

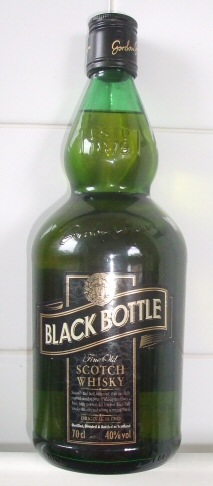
- Type: Scotch Whisky
- Manufacturer: Distell (Heineken N.V.)
- Origin: Scotland
- Introduced: 1879
- Alcohol by volume: 40%

Black Bottle is a blended Scotch Whisky produced by Scotch whisky producer Distell Group Limited a subsidiary of Heineken N.V..

== History ==
The brand was introduced in 1879 and was first produced by Aberdeen tea blenders Charles, David and Gordon Graham.

After many years of decline prompted by a distillery fire and subsequent business sale, Black Bottle was revitalised in 1990 by Burn Stewart Distillers with a new blend using Islay single malt whiskies. In April 2013 Distell bought Burn Stewart Distillers from CL Financial for £160m.

Black Bottle was indeed sold in a black bottle until 1914. Supplies of the black glass bottle came from Germany and had to be abandoned after the start of World War I. Since then, the non-vintage bottle has been dark green, but the 10-year-old and now discontinued 15-year-old bottles are coated with black plastic, giving the appearance of a truly black bottle.

== Variations ==
Black Bottle is available as the standard non-vintage expression (pictured). Whiskies contained in this expression are thought to be at least 7 years old.

Previously more mature expressions were also available, bottled at 10 and 15 years old, but these have been discontinued. However, early in 2020 it was revealed that the producers brought back the 10 years old expression for a limited time and for a few selected markets.

Black Bottle is produced in different bottle sizes (70cl or 75cl) and at different strengths (40% or 43% ABV) depending on the target market (European or American, respectively).
