= Clydesdale (retailer) =

Scottish retailer of electrical goods

- Type: Electrical retailer
- Genre: Electrical, Musical Instruments and Furnishings
- Defunct: 1994
- Fate: Liquidated
- Headquarters: Scotland and Northern England, Glasgow, Scotland, UK
- Area served: Scotland and Northern England
- Key people: Henk Van Enk, Alan Pirie (MDs 1980s/90s)

Clydesdale was a Scottish retailer of electrical goods. At one point, it was Scotland's largest electrical retailer and owned and operated a range of retail businesses including Grampian Discount Stores, James Scott & Co (Electrical), D McDonald & Bros and Scoop (Home Furnishings), Thompsons Music (Pianos and Musical Instruments), Clydesdale Security Systems (Alarms), ConstantCare (TV/Audio Servicing), KG Carriers (distribution & deliveries).

The company went into liquidation in January 1994. Various assets were purchased by Scottish Power, Granada UK Rental and other companies.
