= Louise Duprey =

British character actress (1957–2000)

Louise Duprey (26 April 1957 – February 2000) was a British character actress, best known for her 1993 stint as supermarket worker Amy Nelson in ITV1's soap opera, Coronation Street.

Duprey had been set for a long run in Coronation Street with her character being due to marry on-screen love interest, Andy McDonald. However, in late 1993, just as the wedding scenes were about to be recorded, Duprey suffered a breakdown and was sent home on leave. After it became apparent that she would not be well enough to return to the programme, a storywriters' conference was quickly convened and scripts redrafted. In the programme, viewers saw the engagement between the characters of Andy McDonald and Amy Nelson being hurriedly 'broken off' with another actress, Melanie Brown, being used in the final scenes to play the part of Nelson.

Duprey had previously appeared in an episode of Bread. She also appeared as two different characters, in two episodes of One Foot in the Grave one of which was the One Foot in the Algarve special, which was to be her final television appearance in 1993.

== Personal life and death ==
Duprey married Geoffrey Kasseum in 1976. The couple had one daughter together, Marcelle Duprey, who also become an actress.

After leaving Coronation Street, Duprey withdrew from the limelight altogether, moving back to her native Liverpool and became increasingly reclusive.

In February 2000, aged 42, she was found dead in a converted 1930s detached house which she had been renting in Mossley Hill near Liverpool University. The cause of death was established to be a drug overdose.
