= Three Ships =

Whisky brand

Three Ships is a brand of whisky distilled at the James Sedgwick distillery in Wellington, Western Cape (Drakenstein Local Municipality), South Africa. The distillery produces both malt and grain whiskies on the same site, which is unusual for whisky distilleries. The Three Ships range includes blended and single malt whiskies. Three Ships is owned by Distell, a multinational brewing and beverage company based in South Africa.

Andy Watts is currently the Master Distiller, only the 6th since the distillery was established in 1886.

== Varieties ==
- Three Ships Select
- Three Ships 5 Year Old Premium Select
- Three Ships 10 Year Old Single Malt
- Three Ships Bourbon Cask Finish
- Three Ships Oloroso

== Recognition ==
In 2012, the World Whiskies Awards selected Three Ships 5 Year Old Premium Select as World's Best Blended Whisky. In 2015, Three Ships 10 Year Old Single Malt won Best African Single Malt.

In 2023, Three Ships 12-Year-Old Double Wood was selected as the World’s Best Limited Edition Blended Whisky, and in 2025, the Three Ships Whisky Bourbon Cask was crowned the World's Best Blended Whisky.
