= CL Financial =

Former conglomerate in Trinidad and Tobago

C L Financial Limited
- Traded as: TTSE: CIF
- Industry: Insurance financial services
- Founded: 1993
- Headquarters: 41 - 43 St. Vincent Street; Port of Spain, TT.
- Key people: Lawrence Duprey, Chairman & CEO
- Products: Insurance

CL Financial was the largest privately held conglomerate in Trinidad and Tobago and one of the largest privately held corporations in the entire Caribbean, before the company encountered a major liquidity crisis and subsequent bailout in 2009.

Founded as an insurance company, Colonial Life Insurance Company (CLICO) by Cyril Duprey, it was expanded into a diversified company by his nephew Lawrence Duprey. CL Financial then became one of the largest local conglomerates in the region, encompassing over 65 companies in 32 countries worldwide with total assets exceeding TT$100 billion.

However, CL Financial experienced a liquidity crisis that resulted in a "bail out" agreement by which the government of Trinidad and Tobago loaned the company funds ($7.3 billion as of December 2010) to maintain its ability to operate, and obtained a majority of seats on the company's board of directors. As of late 2010, the company remained in a tenuous position amid tense negotiations with the government, and as of February 2011, the company's web site (www.clfinancial.com) was no longer functioning.

In April 2025 the Trinidad Guardian reported that Trincity Commercial Centre of Home Construction Limited (HCL), which is part of CL Financial (CLF) group, was sold for TT$505 million to a consortium consisting of Johnny Aboud, Anthony Rahael, KallCo and Fides Ltd. Trincity Mall, a large indoor shopping center located adjacent to the Churchill Roosevelt Highway in Trincity is also part of Trincity Commercial Centre.

CL Financial started out as a holding company for Colonial Life Insurance Company (Trinidad) Limited (Clico) in 1993.

== 2009 liquidity crisis ==
In a Trinidad Guardian press release on January 30, 2009, it was announced that the TT Government would "bail out" CL Financial, the parent company of Clico, Angostura and several other local and regional businesses. Key points disclosed were:

- CL Financial is to "divert" its 55 per cent stake in Republic Bank and Methanol Holdings
- First Citizens will gain control of the company's Republic Bank shares.
- The TT Central Bank Governor assures depositors and policyholders that their money will be safe.
- CL Financial chairman Mr Duprey stated that this is "not a crisis" – it is the early addressing of the situation, a pre-emptive action.

During a press conference held later the same day, Central Bank Governor Ewart Williams released a statement revealing that the Bank and the Ministry of Finance had taken control of the assets and liabilities of Colonial Life Insurance Company, Clico Investment Bank (CIB) and Caribbean Money Market Brokers (CMMB). The statement explained that liquidity challenges which CIB had been facing for some weeks came to a head when an unusually high level of withdrawal requests put a strain on available liquid resources. Clico was also facing liquidity problems, to a lesser extent. On January 13, 2009, Clico's Chairman formally raised the issue of possible financial assistance from the Central Bank.

The statement highlighted the contagion risks that financial difficulties in CL Financial Group could have on the overall financial system of Trinidad and Tobago and the Caribbean region: The Group controls over TT$100 billion of assets in at least 28 companies located throughout the Region and the world. The Group's financial interests cover several industry sectors including banking and financial services, energy, real estate and manufacturing and distribution. The four largest financial institutions in the Group manage assets of over TT$38 billion, over 25 percent of the country's GDP. The Group's holdings include the British American Insurance Company Limited, one of the main insurance companies in the Eastern Caribbean.

In the Bank's view, the financial difficulties being faced by CIB and Clico resulted from:

- Excessive related-party transactions which carry significant contagion risks,
- An aggressive high interest rate resource mobilization strategy to finance equally high risk investments,
- Very high leveraging of the Group's assets, which constrains the potential amount of cash that could be raised from the asset sales,
- and, to a lesser extent, depositors’ concerns about the impact of the sharp decline in methanol and real estate prices on CL Financial's overall financial situation.

According to the statement, the Central Bank, the Ministry of Finance and the CL Financial Group have agreed to a strategy intended to deal with the liquidity challenges of CIB and Clico, and to address the underlying problems that gave rise to the current financial stress. The principal objectives are to ensure that resources are available to meet withdrawals of third-party CIB depositors and Clico policy holders, protect the funds of the depositors and policy holders, maintain public confidence in Clico and reinforce public confidence in the financial sector as a whole:

The Central Bank will:

- take control of CIB;
- transfer all the third-party assets and liabilities on the books of CIB and CMMB to First Citizens Bank,
- provide short-term liquidity as needed to ensure that liabilities are serviced, and
- following the execution of these transactions, CIB's banking license will be revoked.

Also, CL Financial will divest additional assets to help fund Clico's existing Statutory Fund deficit. In exchange for collateral and an equity interest in Clico, the Government will provide any additional funding needed to eliminate this deficit, and will "act as a catalyst" for Clico to implement changes to its business model and corporate governance structure - "The intention will be to return Clico to its original moorings".

Mr Williams emphasized that CIB depositors' funds are safe, and assured Clico's policy holders that the long-term future of Clico will be guaranteed. He also emphasized the tremendous strength of the TT financial system, "the envy of the region", and pointed out that, in contrast to the illiquidity of CIB, the rest of the TT banking system is experiencing excess liquidity, an impressively low percentage of non-performing loans, and a more than adequate level of provisions against bad loans. Mr Williams acknowledged the cooperation received from Mr. Duprey and the CL Financial Group, recognized First Citizens Bank for its role, cautioned the entire financial sector to "let competition take a back seat" and support the Government in keeping Clico as a functioning entity, and called for the support of the community of depositors and policyholders.

Mrs Karen Nunez-Tesheira, T&T Minister of Finance, also made a statement describing the urgency with which the government and the Bank is pursuing changes to the regulatory framework governing financial institutions, and reiterating government's commitment to protecting depositors.

A memorandum of understanding (MOU) describing the intended actions, also dated January 30, was signed by the Minister of Finance (on behalf of the Government) and Lawrence Duprey (acting for CL Financial Limited and its affiliates). According to the MOU, the threat was the financial condition of three companies: Colonial Life Insurance Company Trinidad Limited (CLICO Trinidad), CLICO Investment Bank Limited (CIB) and British American Insurance Company Trinidad Limited (BA Trinidad). In return for Government protection of the interest of depositors, policy holders and creditors of these three institutions, CL Financial agreed to sell its Republic Bank shareholdings, its MHTL shareholdings, its CMMB Shareholdings, and any other assets as required.

According to the Trinidad Express, Winston Dookeran, Congress of the People (COP) leader and former Central Bank governor, said Central Bank Governor Ewart Williams, First Citizens CEO Larry Howai, CL Financial chairman Lawrence Duprey and Finance Minister Karen Nunez-Tesheira had "delivered a damning indictment of their collective stewardship while trying to distract the nation with a pathetic display of self congratulation at their ability to speak with the same forked tongue". He expressed concern that the Governor was unable to state the size of the financial hole to be plugged at CLICO. The Trinidad Express also noted that the "meltdown" leaves the TT $12 billion Essar Steel Caribbean Limited (ESCL), an India-based foreign investment project, in limbo - including the associated natural gas supply contract which was expected to boost revenues of the National Gas Company by eight per cent.

The Jamaica Observer report on the rescue noted that in 2008 CL Financial purchased an 86.6 per cent stake in Lascelles de Mercado (parent company of Appleton Jamaica Rum), and also bought a 40 per cent stake in Caribbean Money Market Brokers from Jamaica Money Market Brokers.

In Barbados, the Nation Newspaper reported that Leroy Parris, chairman of CLICO Holdings Barbados Limited, sought to allay fears among policyholders and other investors. Parris said what had occurred in Trinidad "had no effect on Barbados and the Eastern Caribbean". Parris stressed that the Bajan company was autonomous and its management structure, balance sheets and auditing were totally separate. "CLICO in Barbados is separate from the Trinidad and Tobago operation which is supervised by the Central Bank and Ministry of Finance. In Barbados, CLICO is supervised by the Supervisor of Insurance and the Ministry of Finance. We are regulated by Barbados and the Barbados Government," he stated. The chairman also stated that the capital projects involving CLICO Holdings were still on stream, including a B$60 million housing project in Clermont, St Michael and the B$140 million redevelopment of historic Sam Lord's Castle hotel.

== Criminal Probe into Asset Disposal (October 2025) ==
In October 2025, the disposal of CL Financial assets, managed by court-appointed liquidators Grant Thornton, came under a formal criminal investigation. The probe was ordered by the Commissioner of Police (CoP) and assigned to the Anti-Corruption Investigation Bureau (ACIB). This followed official complaints from Legacy Shareholders Ltd., a group representing CLF shareholders and residual creditors, who alleged "irregularities, undervalued sales, and a lack of transparency" in the asset disposal process. This action was prompted by a High Court injunction issued by Justice Kevin Ramcharan—who has overseen the CLF liquidation since 2017—to immediately halt the planned sale of the Trincity Commercial Centre Ltd.

== See also ==
- 2008 financial crisis
