= List of listed buildings in Dyke And Moy, Moray =

This is a list of listed buildings in the parish of Dyke And Moy in Moray, Scotland.

== List ==
Name	Location	Date Listed	Grid Ref. (Note: Sometimes known as OSGB36, the grid reference (where provided) is based on the British national grid reference system used by the Ordnance Survey. • "Guide to National Grid". Ordnance Survey. • "Get-a-map". Ordnance Survey.)	Geo-coordinates	Notes	LB Number (Note: Historic Environment Scotland assign a unique alphanumeric identifier to each designated site in Scotland, for listed buildings this always begins with "LB", for example "LB12345".)	Image
Brodie Castle, Station Lodge And Gatepiers				57°35′38″N 3°42′39″W	Category C(S)	2262	Upload another image
Brodie Castle, West Lodge				57°35′48″N 3°42′59″W	Category C(S)	2263	Upload another image
Darnaway, Whitemire Village, No 63 (Pinewood) No 64				57°33′57″N 3°42′36″W	Category B	2267	Upload Photo
Earlsmill Bridge Over Muckle Burn				57°34′59″N 3°43′31″W	Category C(S)	2270	Upload another image
Findhorn Bridge Over River Findhorn				57°36′08″N 3°39′19″W	Category B	2273	Upload another image See more images
Darnaway Castle, Stables And Carriage-House				57°34′25″N 3°40′57″W	Category B	2284	Upload Photo
Darnaway, West Lodge, Gatepiers And Gates				57°34′46″N 3°42′54″W	Category A	2288	Upload Photo
Barleymill Bridge Over Muckle Burn				57°35′46″N 3°41′47″W	Category B	2258	Upload another image
Earlsmill House And Gatepiers				57°34′51″N 3°43′16″W	Category B	2271	Upload Photo
Moy Mains, Former Stables And Carriage-Houses				57°37′15″N 3°38′53″W	Category A	2276	Upload Photo
Dalvey House, East Lodge And Gatepiers				57°36′21″N 3°39′54″W	Category C(S)	2281	Upload another image
Dalvey Cottage				57°36′03″N 3°40′07″W	Category B	2282	Upload Photo
Moy Bridge Over Muckle Burn				57°37′22″N 3°39′04″W	Category B	2292	Upload another image
Bernera Cottage				57°36′38″N 3°40′59″W	Category B	2259	Upload Photo
Darnaway, Whitemire Village, No 65 (The Neuk)				57°33′57″N 3°42′37″W	Category B	2268	Upload Photo
Dyke Parish Church (Church Of Scotland), Church Hall, (Former Mausoleum), Burial Ground And War Memorial Gate Arch				57°36′16″N 3°41′29″W	Category A	2269	Upload another image See more images
Kincorth House And Garden Walls				57°38′00″N 3°39′21″W	Category B	2274	Upload another image
Moy House And Gatepiers				57°37′08″N 3°39′01″W	Category A	2275	Upload another image
Dalvey House, Gardener's Cottage				57°36′23″N 3°39′59″W	Category C(S)	2280	Upload Photo
Darnaway, Keeper's House And Kennels				57°34′58″N 3°40′48″W	Category B	2286	Upload Photo
Darnaway, East Lodge, Gatepiers And Gates				57°35′28″N 3°41′03″W	Category A	2287	Upload another image
Abbotshill Bridge Over Muckle Burn				57°36′16″N 3°40′43″W	Category B	2257	Upload another image
Brodie Castle, Burial Ground				57°35′42″N 3°43′09″W	Category B	2264	Upload another image
Darnaway, Whitemire Village, No 59 (Kistie) No 60 (Randolph)				57°33′58″N 3°42′34″W	Category B	2265	Upload Photo
Darnaway, Whitemire Village, No 61 (Stephen) No 62				57°33′57″N 3°42′35″W	Category C(S)	2266	Upload Photo
Dalvey House				57°36′25″N 3°40′07″W	Category B	2277	Upload another image See more images
Dalvey House, Dovecot				57°36′27″N 3°40′10″W	Category B	2278	Upload Photo
Darnaway Castle, and Terraces				57°34′28″N 3°41′02″W	Category A	2283	Upload another image
Tearie Farmhouse				57°35′27″N 3°41′40″W	Category C(S)	2293	Upload Photo
Darnaway, Walled Garden, East. Gatepiers And Gates (Redstone Nursery Gardens)				57°34′12″N 3°40′44″W	Category B	2285	Upload another image
Dalvey House, Bridge Over The Muckle Burn				57°36′22″N 3°40′01″W	Category B	2279	Upload another image
Brodie Castle				57°35′54″N 3°42′32″W	Category A	2260	Upload another image See more images
Brodie Castle, Stables				57°35′29″N 3°42′41″W	Category B	2261	Upload another image
Feddan Farmhouse				57°35′12″N 3°43′38″W	Category B	2272	Upload another image

== Key ==
The scheme for classifying buildings in Scotland is:

- Category A: "buildings of national or international importance, either architectural or historic; or fine, little-altered examples of some particular period, style or building type."
- Category B: "buildings of regional or more than local importance; or major examples of some particular period, style or building type, which may have been altered."
- Category C: "buildings of local importance; lesser examples of any period, style, or building type, as originally constructed or moderately altered; and simple traditional buildings which group well with other listed buildings."

In March 2016 there were 47,288 listed buildings in Scotland. Of these, 8% were Category A, and 50% were Category B, with the remaining 42% being Category C.

== See also ==
- List of listed buildings in Moray
