= List of listed buildings in Botriphnie, Moray =

This is a list of listed buildings in the parish of Botriphnie in Moray, Scotland.

== List ==
| Name | Location | Date Listed | Grid Ref. (Note: Sometimes known as OSGB36, the grid reference (where provided) is based on the British national grid reference system used by the Ordnance Survey. • "Guide to National Grid". Ordnance Survey. • "Get-a-map". Ordnance Survey.) | Geo-coordinates | Notes | LB Number (Note: Historic Environment Scotland assign a unique alphanumeric identifier to each designated site in Scotland, for listed buildings this always begins with "LB", for example "LB12345".) | Image |
|---|---|---|---|---|---|---|---|
| Drummuir, Botriphnie Parish Church (C Of S) And Burial Ground With Remains Of Former Church And Mural Monuments | | | | 57°28′59″N 3°02′36″W | Category B | 4283 | Upload another image |
| Mill Of Towie, Granary (Restaurant) | | | | 57°30′41″N 2°59′25″W | Category B | 2304 | Upload another image |
| Mill Of Towie, Miller's Cottage And Steading | | | | 57°30′40″N 2°59′26″W | Category C(S) | 2305 | Upload Photo |
| Drummuir Tollhouse | | | | 57°28′34″N 3°03′43″W | Category B | 2302 | Upload another image |
| Mill Of Towie, Former Carter's Cottage | | | | 57°30′41″N 2°59′25″W | Category C(S) | 2306 | Upload Photo |
| Drummuir Castle, Gate Lodge | | | | 57°29′07″N 3°02′32″W | Category B | 2297 | Upload another image |
| Drummuir, Botriphnie Primary School | | | | 57°29′00″N 3°02′13″W | Category B | 2300 | Upload another image |
| Drummuir Castle, Home Farm Steading | | | | 57°29′10″N 3°02′53″W | Category B | 2298 | Upload Photo |
| Drummuir, Kirkton House | | | | 57°28′56″N 3°02′40″W | Category B | 2299 | Upload another image |
| Drummuir Mains House | | | | 57°29′26″N 2°59′29″W | Category B | 2301 | Upload another image |
| Mill Of Towie | | | | 57°30′41″N 2°59′27″W | Category A | 2303 | Upload another image |
| Drummuir Castle | | | | 57°28′58″N 3°03′00″W | Category A | 2296 | Upload Photo |

== Key ==
The scheme for classifying buildings in Scotland is:

- Category A: "buildings of national or international importance, either architectural or historic; or fine, little-altered examples of some particular period, style or building type."
- Category B: "buildings of regional or more than local importance; or major examples of some particular period, style or building type, which may have been altered."
- Category C: "buildings of local importance; lesser examples of any period, style, or building type, as originally constructed or moderately altered; and simple traditional buildings which group well with other listed buildings."

In March 2016 there were 47,288 listed buildings in Scotland. Of these, 8% were Category A, and 50% were Category B, with the remaining 42% being Category C.

== See also ==
- List of listed buildings in Moray
