= Brodie Castle =

Castle in Moray, Scotland

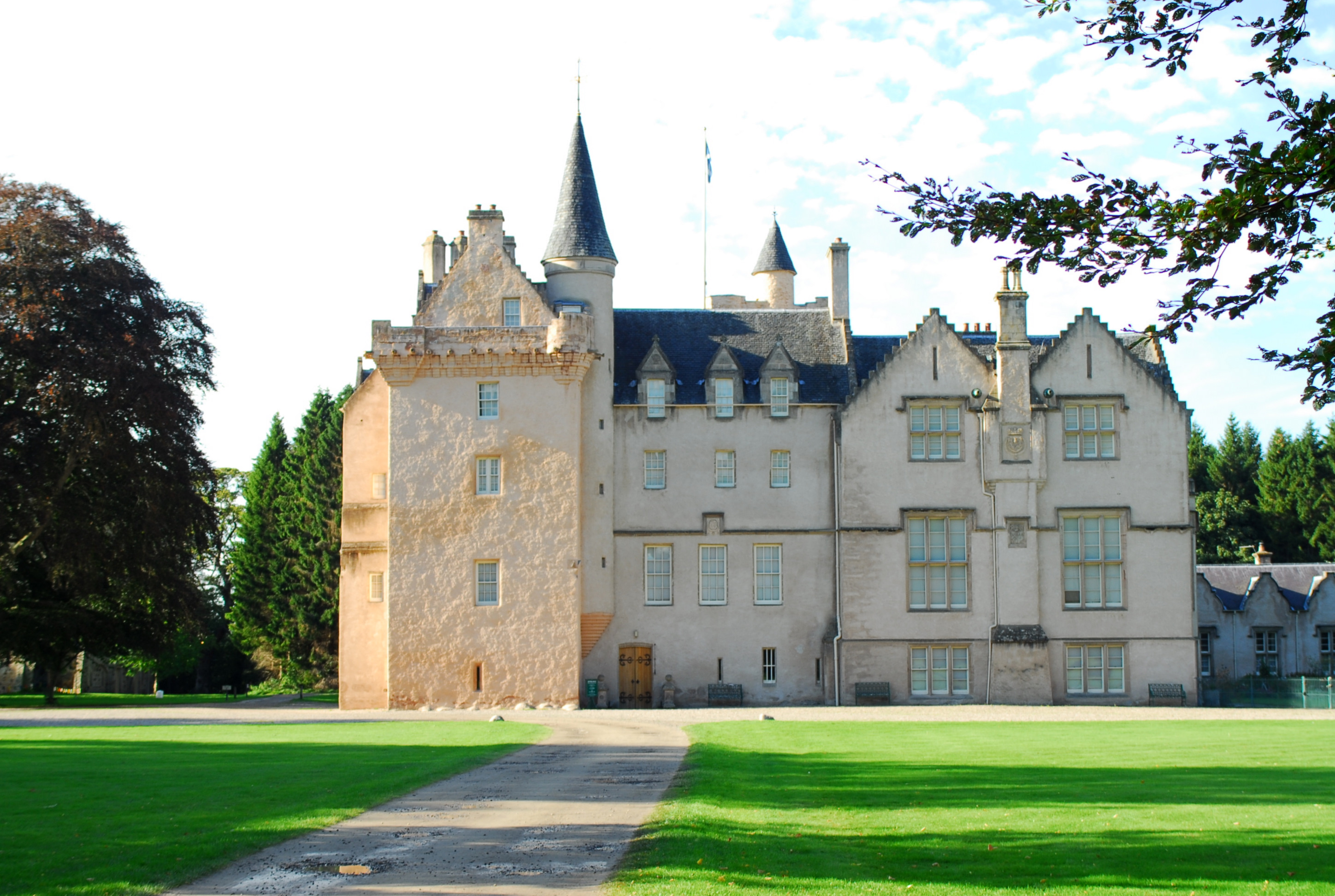
- Brodie Castle, showing the 16th-century tower on the left, and William Burn's extensions to the right

Site information
- Owner: National Trust for Scotland
- Open to the public: Yes

Location
- Location in Moray, Scotland
- Coordinates: 57°35′54″N 3°42′32″W

Site history
- Built: 1567; Rebuilt in 1824-1845.
- Demolished: Burned in 1645

Designations

Inventory of Gardens and Designed Landscapes in Scotland
- Official name: Brodie Castle
- Designated: 30 June 1987
- Reference no.: GDL00072

Brodie Castle is a well-preserved Z-plan tower house located north of Brodie about 3.5 miles (5.5 kilometres) west of Forres, in Moray, Scotland. It is a Category A listed building, and the grounds are included in the Inventory of Gardens and Designed Landscapes in Scotland.

== The Brodie family ==
The original Z-plan tower house was completed in 1567 by Clan Brodie and was partially burnt by fire in 1645 by Lewis Gordon of Clan Gordon, the 3rd Marquess of Huntly. In 1824 the architect William Burn was commissioned to convert it into a mansion house in the Scots Baronial style, but these additions were only partially completed and were later remodelled by James Wylson (c. 1845).

It is widely accepted that the family has been associated with the land on which the castle stands since around 1160, when it is believed that King Malcolm IV gave the land to the family.

Ninian Brodie of Brodie, the last member of the family to reside in the castle, died in 2003. One wing of the castle is available for visitors to hire as holiday accommodation through Sykes Cottages.

== The castle today ==
There is a well-preserved 16th-century central keep with two 5-storey towers on opposing corners. The interior of the castle is also well preserved, containing fine antique furniture, Oriental artefacts and intricate ceilings, largely dating from the 17th–19th centuries.

Today the castle and surrounding policies, including a national daffodil collection, are owned by the National Trust for Scotland and are open to the public throughout the year. The castle may be hired for weddings and indoor or outdoor events.

An ancient Pictish monument known as Rodney's Stone can be seen in the castle grounds.

== See also ==
- Clan Brodie
- Elizabeth Gordon, Duchess of Gordon
- List of listed buildings in Dyke And Moy, Moray
- List of castles in Scotland
- List of places in Moray
