= List of listed buildings in Alves, Moray =

This is a list of listed buildings in the parish of Alves in Moray, Scotland.

== List ==
| Name | Location | Date Listed | Grid Ref. (Note: Sometimes known as OSGB36, the grid reference (where provided) is based on the British national grid reference system used by the Ordnance Survey. • "Guide to National Grid". Ordnance Survey. • "Get-a-map". Ordnance Survey.) | Geo-coordinates | Notes | LB Number (Note: Historic Environment Scotland assign a unique alphanumeric identifier to each designated site in Scotland, for listed buildings this always begins with "LB", for example "LB12345".) | Image |
|---|---|---|---|---|---|---|---|
| Old Parish Church And Walled Burial Ground, Including Russell Burial Enclosure | | | | 57°38′52″N 3°27′04″W | Category B | 2330 | Upload another image |
| Windsor House (Former Church Of Scotland Manse), Steading And Walled Garden | | | | 57°38′54″N 3°27′06″W | Category B | 2332 | Upload Photo |
| Alves Parish Church (Church Of Scotland, Former Free Church) And Enclosing Wall | | | | 57°38′06″N 3°28′00″W | Category B | 2333 | Upload Photo |
| Newton House, Gatepiers And Walled Garden | | | | 57°39′13″N 3°24′18″W | Category B | 2327 | Upload Photo |
| Newton, Toll Cottage | | | | 57°39′00″N 3°23′52″W | Category B | 2328 | Upload Photo |
| Milton Brodie, Gazebo Located To S Of (Former) Walled Garden Of Milton Brodie House | | | | 57°38′45″N 3°31′18″W | Category B | 2337 | Upload Photo |
| Milton Brodie House And Gatepiers | | | | 57°38′50″N 3°31′22″W | Category A | 2336 | Upload another image |
| Newton, York Tower And Forteath Mausoleum | | | | 57°38′56″N 3°24′13″W | Category B | 2329 | Upload another image |
| Sparrow Castle | | | | 57°39′13″N 3°27′07″W | Category B | 2331 | Upload Photo |
| Alves Primary School And Former Infant School With Enclosing Wall | | | | 57°38′27″N 3°27′15″W | Category B | 2334 | Upload Photo |
| Inchstelly Farmhouse | | | | 57°39′09″N 3°26′35″W | Category B | 2335 | Upload Photo |

== Key ==
The scheme for classifying buildings in Scotland is:

- Category A: "buildings of national or international importance, either architectural or historic; or fine, little-altered examples of some particular period, style or building type."
- Category B: "buildings of regional or more than local importance; or major examples of some particular period, style or building type, which may have been altered."
- Category C: "buildings of local importance; lesser examples of any period, style, or building type, as originally constructed or moderately altered; and simple traditional buildings which group well with other listed buildings."

In March 2016 there were 47,288 listed buildings in Scotland. Of these, 8% were Category A, and 50% were Category B, with the remaining 42% being Category C.

== See also ==
- List of listed buildings in Moray
