= List of listed buildings in Spynie, Moray =

This is a list of listed buildings in the parish of Spynie in Moray, Scotland.

== List ==
Name	Location	Date Listed	Grid Ref. (Note: Sometimes known as OSGB36, the grid reference (where provided) is based on the British national grid reference system used by the Ordnance Survey. • "Guide to National Grid". Ordnance Survey. • "Get-a-map". Ordnance Survey.)	Geo-coordinates	Notes	LB Number (Note: Historic Environment Scotland assign a unique alphanumeric identifier to each designated site in Scotland, for listed buildings this always begins with "LB", for example "LB12345".)	Image
New Spynie, Dovecot				57°39′36″N 3°22′27″W	Category B	15570	Upload another image
Rosehaugh, Old House To Rear Of Rosehaugh Farmhouse				57°39′42″N 3°23′56″W	Category B	15574	Upload Photo
Forres Road, The Oakwood And Bungalow				57°38′52″N 3°21′59″W	Category C(S)	15572	Upload another image See more images
New Spynie, Spynie Parish Church (Church Of Scotland) And Enclosing Walls				57°39′37″N 3°22′18″W	Category B	15568	Upload another image See more images
Newton Nurseries (Former Newton House Mains Farm,) Barn				57°39′20″N 3°24′20″W	Category C(S)	15571	Upload Photo
Rosebrae House (Rosebrae School)				57°39′32″N 3°23′20″W	Category B	15573	Upload Photo
Findrassie House And Gatepiers				57°40′08″N 3°21′03″W	Category B	15594	Upload Photo
Spynie Burial Ground				57°40′21″N 3°17′42″W	Category B	15575	Upload another image See more images
New Spynie, Quarrywood House (Former Church Of Scotland Manse) And Garden Walls				57°39′36″N 3°22′21″W	Category B	15569	Upload another image
Wester Kintrae Farmhouse				57°40′04″N 3°23′03″W	Category B	15576	Upload Photo
Aldroughty House				57°38′37″N 3°22′03″W	Category B	15592	Upload Photo
The Bield				57°38′48″N 3°21′14″W	Category B	15593	Upload Photo
Findrassie, Dovecot				57°40′14″N 3°21′15″W	Category B	15595	Upload another image

== Key ==
The scheme for classifying buildings in Scotland is:

- Category A: "buildings of national or international importance, either architectural or historic; or fine, little-altered examples of some particular period, style or building type."
- Category B: "buildings of regional or more than local importance; or major examples of some particular period, style or building type, which may have been altered."
- Category C: "buildings of local importance; lesser examples of any period, style, or building type, as originally constructed or moderately altered; and simple traditional buildings which group well with other listed buildings."

In March 2016 there were 47,288 listed buildings in Scotland. Of these, 8% were Category A, and 50% were Category B, with the remaining 42% being Category C.

== See also ==
- List of listed buildings in Moray
