= List of listed buildings in Buckie, Moray =

Buildings in Buckie, Scotland

This is a list of listed buildings in the parish of Buckie in Moray, Scotland.

== List ==
Name	Location	Date listed	Grid ref. (Note: Sometimes known as OSGB36, the grid reference (where provided) is based on the British national grid reference system used by the Ordnance Survey. • "Guide to National Grid". Ordnance Survey. • "Get-a-map". Ordnance Survey.)	Geo-coordinates	Notes	LB number (Note: Historic Environment Scotland assign a unique alphanumeric identifier to each designated site in Scotland, for listed buildings this always begins with "LB", for example "LB12345".)	Image
Buckie, St Andrews Square, St Peter's Roman Catholic Church, Presbytery And Enclosing Walls				57°40′25″N 2°58′33″W	Category A	22720	Upload Photo
Buckie Harbour, 17 Low Street, Former Lifeboat Station				57°40′43″N 2°57′45″W	Category B	22723	Upload Photo
40 Yardie				57°40′41″N 2°58′22″W	Category B	22733	Upload Photo
Buckie, 7 Baron Street, Cluny Lodge And Garden Wall				57°40′39″N 2°58′01″W	Category B	22717	Upload Photo
Buckie, West Church Street, All Saints Episcopal Church Hall And Parsonage				57°40′34″N 2°57′59″W	Category B	22721	Upload Photo
Buckpool, 35 Harbour Head				57°40′33″N 2°58′47″W	Category B	22728	Upload Photo
Buckie Harbour, North Pier, Lighthouse				57°40′50″N 2°57′39″W	Category C(S)	22724	Upload Photo
42 Yardie				57°40′40″N 2°58′22″W	Category C(S)	22734	Upload Photo
Buckpool, 87 Main Street And Garden Wall				57°40′32″N 2°58′49″W	Category C(S)	22729	Upload Photo
39 Yardie				57°40′40″N 2°58′22″W	Category C(S)	22730	Upload Photo
68 Yardie				57°40′39″N 2°58′26″W	Category C(S)	22738	Upload Photo
Buckie, East Church Street, Buckie North Parish Church (Church Of Scotland)				57°40′37″N 2°57′53″W	Category B	22719	Upload Photo
Buckpool, Harbour				57°40′38″N 2°58′38″W	Category C(S)	22726	Upload Photo
60 Yardie				57°40′40″N 2°58′25″W	Category C(S)	22737	Upload Photo
Buckie, Cluny Square, War Memorial				57°40′35″N 2°57′55″W	Category B	22718	Upload another image
Buckie Harbour, North West And North Piers				57°40′49″N 2°57′34″W	Category B	22725	Upload Photo
48 Yardie				57°40′40″N 2°58′24″W	Category C(S)	22735	Upload Photo
50 Yardie				57°40′40″N 2°58′23″W	Category C(S)	22736	Upload Photo
Buckie Harbour, Cliff Terrace, Leading Light				57°40′43″N 2°57′21″W	Category C(S)	22722	Upload Photo
Buckpool, 28 Harbour Head, Pair Fish Smoking Kilns				57°40′33″N 2°58′47″W	Category B	22727	Upload Photo
41 Yardie				57°40′41″N 2°58′22″W	Category C(S)	22731	Upload Photo
43 Yardie				57°40′41″N 2°58′22″W	Category C(S)	22732	Upload Photo

== Key ==
The scheme for classifying buildings in Scotland is:

- Category A: "buildings of national or international importance, either architectural or historic; or fine, little-altered examples of some particular period, style or building type."
- Category B: "buildings of regional or more than local importance; or major examples of some particular period, style or building type, which may have been altered."
- Category C: "buildings of local importance; lesser examples of any period, style, or building type, as originally constructed or moderately altered; and simple traditional buildings which group well with other listed buildings."

In March 2016 there were 47,288 listed buildings in Scotland. Of these, 8% were Category A, and 50% were Category B, with the remaining 42% being Category C.

== See also ==
- List of listed buildings in Moray
