= List of listed buildings in Moray =

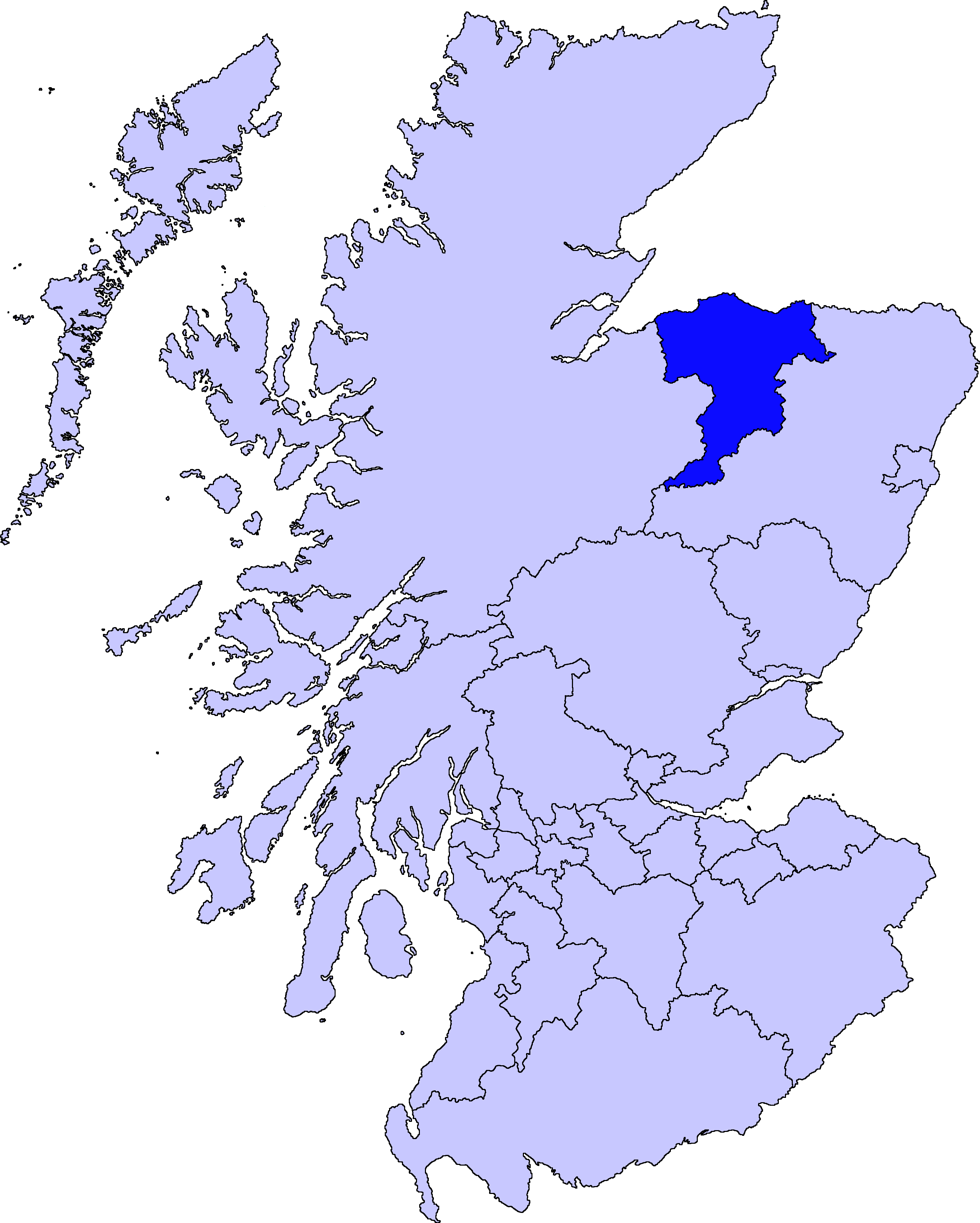
Moray shown within Scotland

This is a list of listed buildings in Moray. The list is split out by parish.

- List of listed buildings in Aberlour, Moray
- List of listed buildings in Alves, Moray
- List of listed buildings in Bellie, Moray
- List of listed buildings in Birnie, Moray
- List of listed buildings in Boharm, Moray
- List of listed buildings in Botriphnie, Moray
- List of listed buildings in Buckie, Moray
- List of listed buildings in Burghead, Moray
- List of listed buildings in Cabrach, Moray
- List of listed buildings in Cullen, Moray
- List of listed buildings in Dallas, Moray
- List of listed buildings in Deskford, Moray
- List of listed buildings in Drainie, Moray
- List of listed buildings in Dufftown, Moray
- List of listed buildings in Duffus, Moray
- List of listed buildings in Dyke And Moy, Moray
- List of listed buildings in Edinkillie, Moray
- List of listed buildings in Elgin, Moray
- List of listed buildings in Findochty, Moray
- List of listed buildings in Forres, Moray
- List of listed buildings in Grange, Moray
- List of listed buildings in Inveravon, Moray
- List of listed buildings in Keith, Moray
- List of listed buildings in Kinloss, Moray
- List of listed buildings in Kirkmichael, Moray
- List of listed buildings in Knockando, Moray
- List of listed buildings in Lossiemouth, Moray
- List of listed buildings in Mortlach, Moray
- List of listed buildings in Portknockie, Moray
- List of listed buildings in Rafford, Moray
- List of listed buildings in Rathven, Moray
- List of listed buildings in Rothes, Moray
- List of listed buildings in Rothiemay, Moray
- List of listed buildings in Speymouth, Moray
- List of listed buildings in Spynie, Moray
- List of listed buildings in St Andrews-Lhanbryd, Moray
- List of listed buildings in Urquhart, Moray

== See also ==
- Scheduled monuments in Moray
