= List of listed buildings in Rothes, Moray =

This is a list of listed buildings in the parish of Rothes in Moray, Scotland.

== List ==
Name	Location	Date listed	Grid ref.	Geo-coordinates	Notes	Category	LB number	Image
Glebe House (Former Free Church Manse) And Garden Walls		24 Mar 1988		57°31′10″N 3°12′36″W		B	40439	Upload Photo
Orton House, Dovecot		26 Jan 1971		57°33′52″N 3°08′45″W		B	15829	Upload another image
Orton, West Lodge		9 Nov 1987		57°34′16″N 3°09′11″W		C(S)	15830	Upload Photo
Boat O' Brig Railway Viaduct Over River Spey		9 Nov 1987		57°33′04″N 3°08′24″W		B	15849	Upload another image
Orton, Mausoleum, Enclosing Burial Ground Walls And St Mary's Well		9 Nov 1987		57°34′54″N 3°07′58″W		B	15867	Upload another image
Rothes Glen Hotel (Formerly Birchfield)		9 Nov 1987		57°33′26″N 3°14′51″W		B	15871	Upload Photo
8, 10, 12, 14, 16, High Street		24 Mar 1988		57°31′36″N 3°12′28″W		B	40443	Upload Photo
Orton, Roo Emah And Marwin (Former Railway Houses And Station		9 Nov 1987		57°33′41″N 3°09′06″W		B	15870	Upload Photo
High Street/Seafield Square, Rothes Parish Church (Church Of Scotland)		26 Jan 1971		57°31′37″N 3°12′27″W		B	40440	Upload Photo
67 New Street		24 Mar 1988		57°31′47″N 3°12′29″W		B	40444	Upload Photo
Dundurcas Old Church And Burial Ground		9 Nov 1987		57°32′39″N 3°10′02″W		B	15827	Upload another image
Orton House		26 Jan 1971		57°34′13″N 3°08′53″W		B	15828	Upload another image
Rothes Glen, Brylach (Former Stable/Carriage House)		9 Nov 1987		57°33′19″N 3°14′52″W		B	15850	Upload Photo
Rothes Glen, Kennels Lodge		9 Nov 1987		57°33′16″N 3°14′44″W		C(S)	15851	Upload Photo
Speyburn Distillery, Malt-Barn And Malt Kiln		9 Nov 1987		57°32′11″N 3°12′57″W		B	15852	Upload another image
The Grange (Former Church Of Scotland Manse) And Garden Walls		24 Mar 1988		57°31′39″N 3°12′38″W		C(S)	40438	Upload Photo
Off High Street, Kirk Place, Land Farm Barn/Store		24 Mar 1988		57°31′36″N 3°12′25″W		B	40441	Upload Photo
Auchinroath Bridge Over Millstoneford Burn		9 Nov 1987		57°32′47″N 3°13′35″W		C(S)	15848	Upload Photo
Orton, St Mary's		9 Nov 1987		57°34′59″N 3°08′03″W		C(S)	15868	Upload Photo
Orton, Chapel Cottage (Formerly St Mary's Cottage)		9 Nov 1987		57°34′52″N 3°08′16″W		B	15869	Upload Photo
6 High Street		24 Mar 1988		57°31′36″N 3°12′28″W		B	40442	Upload Photo
Orton, Farm Home Steading (Excluding Cottages)		9 Nov 1987		57°34′16″N 3°09′03″W		C(S)	15831	Upload another image

== Key ==
The scheme for classifying buildings in Scotland is:

- Category A: "buildings of national or international importance, either architectural or historic; or fine, little-altered examples of some particular period, style or building type."
- Category B: "buildings of regional or more than local importance; or major examples of some particular period, style or building type, which may have been altered."
- Category C: "buildings of local importance; lesser examples of any period, style, or building type, as originally constructed or moderately altered; and simple traditional buildings which group well with other listed buildings."

In March 2016 there were 47,288 listed buildings in Scotland. Of these, 8% were Category A, and 50% were Category B, with the remaining 42% being Category C.

== See also ==
- List of listed buildings in Moray
