= List of listed buildings in Mortlach, Moray =

This is a list of listed buildings in the parish of Mortlach in Moray, Scotland.

== List ==
Name	Location	Date Listed	Grid Ref. (Note: Sometimes known as OSGB36, the grid reference (where provided) is based on the British national grid reference system used by the Ordnance Survey. • "Guide to National Grid". Ordnance Survey. • "Get-a-map". Ordnance Survey.)	Geo-coordinates	Notes	LB Number (Note: Historic Environment Scotland assign a unique alphanumeric identifier to each designated site in Scotland, for listed buildings this always begins with "LB", for example "LB12345".)	Image
Danesfield (Former Mortlach Church Of Scotland Manse) And Garden Wall				57°26′22″N 3°07′40″W	Category B	15855	Upload Photo
Hazelwood				57°29′08″N 3°08′22″W	Category B	15861	Upload Photo
Glen Rinnes Church (Church Of Scotland), Enclosing Walls And War Memorial				57°23′16″N 3°12′09″W	Category B	15858	Upload Photo
Kininvie House				57°28′54″N 3°08′16″W	Category A	15862	Upload another image
Kininvie House Dovecot				57°28′53″N 3°08′10″W	Category B	15863	Upload Photo
Tullich House				57°28′10″N 3°07′38″W	Category B	15866	Upload Photo
Mortlach Parish Church, (Church Of Scotland), Watch House And Burial Ground				57°26′20″N 3°07′40″W	Category A	15864	Upload another image
Edinglassie Mains Farmhouse				57°26′09″N 2°57′51″W	Category C(S)	15856	Upload another image
Pittyvaich Farmhouse				57°26′11″N 3°07′47″W	Category B	19762	Upload another image
Bridge Of Poolinch Over River Fiddich				57°27′07″N 3°07′11″W	Category C(S)	15854	Upload another image
Edinglassie Mains Steading And Former Stables				57°26′11″N 2°57′51″W	Category C(S)	15857	Upload another image
Glen Rinnes Lodge				57°25′58″N 3°08′49″W	Category B	15859	Upload Photo
Hardhaugh, Mortlach				57°26′16″N 3°07′37″W	Category C(S)	15860	Upload Photo
Auchindoun Mill				57°26′44″N 3°04′26″W	Category B	15853	Upload another image
Parkmore Distillery, Yeast Store, Kiln, Workshops And Offices. Also Duty Free Warehouses Nos 1, 2, 4, 6, 8				57°27′19″N 3°07′14″W	Category B	15865	Upload another image

== Key ==
The scheme for classifying buildings in Scotland is:

- Category A: "buildings of national or international importance, either architectural or historic; or fine, little-altered examples of some particular period, style or building type."
- Category B: "buildings of regional or more than local importance; or major examples of some particular period, style or building type, which may have been altered."
- Category C: "buildings of local importance; lesser examples of any period, style, or building type, as originally constructed or moderately altered; and simple traditional buildings which group well with other listed buildings."

In March 2016 there were 47,288 listed buildings in Scotland. Of these, 8% were Category A, and 50% were Category B, with the remaining 42% being Category C.

== See also ==
- List of listed buildings in Moray
