= List of listed buildings in Knockando, Moray =

This is a list of listed buildings in the parish of Knockando in Moray, Scotland.

== List ==
Name	Location	Date Listed	Grid Ref. (Note: Sometimes known as OSGB36, the grid reference (where provided) is based on the British national grid reference system used by the Ordnance Survey. • "Guide to National Grid". Ordnance Survey. • "Get-a-map". Ordnance Survey.)	Geo-coordinates	Notes	LB Number (Note: Historic Environment Scotland assign a unique alphanumeric identifier to each designated site in Scotland, for listed buildings this always begins with "LB", for example "LB12345".)	Image
Archiestown, The Square, Old Free Church Manse				57°28′55″N 3°17′13″W	Category B	8493	Upload Photo
By Carron Bridge, Nos 1-10 (Including Nos) Imperial Cottages				57°27′28″N 3°18′31″W	Category B	8496	Upload Photo
Knockando Woolmill Cottage				57°27′57″N 3°21′20″W	Category B	49467	Upload Photo
Knockando Woolmill House				57°27′57″N 3°21′19″W	Category C(S)	49468	Upload Photo
Knockando House				57°27′55″N 3°19′41″W	Category B	8499	Upload Photo
Knockando Woolmill Byre				57°27′57″N 3°21′21″W	Category B	49466	Upload Photo
Knockando Watch House And Burial Ground To Parish Church				57°28′08″N 3°21′29″W	Category C(S)	8498	Upload Photo
Macallan Old Burial Ground And Elchies Mausoleum				57°28′58″N 3°12′15″W	Category B	8501	Upload Photo
Knockando Woolmill Including Machinery, Waterpower System, Tenter Posts, Winter Drying Shed And Shop				57°27′58″N 3°21′20″W	Category A	13624	Upload Photo
Archiestown, The Square, Old St Andrews				57°28′55″N 3°17′11″W	Category B	8494	Upload Photo
Carron Bridge Over River Spey				57°27′15″N 3°17′38″W	Category A	8495	Upload Photo
Easter Elchies House				57°29′04″N 3°12′13″W	Category B	8497	Upload Photo
Wester Elchies, Dovecot				57°28′17″N 3°14′32″W	Category B	8503	Upload Photo
Archiestown, 31 High Street, The Cottage, Gatepiers And Enclosing Walls				57°28′53″N 3°16′57″W	Category B	8483	Upload Photo
Tamdhu Distillery Visitors' Centre, (Former Knockando Railway Station Ticket Office And Waiting Room, Former Signal Box)				57°27′30″N 3°20′59″W	Category C(S)	8502	Upload Photo
Knockando House, Dovecot				57°27′55″N 3°19′34″W	Category B	8500	Upload Photo

== Key ==
The scheme for classifying buildings in Scotland is:

- Category A: "buildings of national or international importance, either architectural or historic; or fine, little-altered examples of some particular period, style or building type."
- Category B: "buildings of regional or more than local importance; or major examples of some particular period, style or building type, which may have been altered."
- Category C: "buildings of local importance; lesser examples of any period, style, or building type, as originally constructed or moderately altered; and simple traditional buildings which group well with other listed buildings."

In March 2016 there were 47,288 listed buildings in Scotland. Of these, 8% were Category A, and 50% were Category B, with the remaining 42% being Category C.

== See also ==
- List of listed buildings in Moray
