= List of listed buildings in Edinkillie, Moray =

This is a list of listed buildings in the parish of Edinkillie in Moray, Scotland.

== List ==
Name	Location	Date listed	Geo-coordinates	Notes	Category	LB number	Image
43 Conicavel (Dowans) 43B Conicavel (Sharpies)			57°33′36″N 3°40′48″W		B	2164	Upload Photo
Dounduff Lodge			57°31′53″N 3°41′00″W		C(S)	2169	Upload Photo
Dunphail Castle			57°30′44″N 3°39′33″W		C(S)	2170	Upload Photo
Edinkillie Railway Viaduct (Divie Viaduct) Over River Divie			57°29′53″N 3°38′01″W		B	2189	Upload Photo
Sluie Mains Cottages			57°33′09″N 3°39′38″W		B	2196	Upload Photo
Edinkillie, Bantrach Bridge Over River Divie			57°29′41″N 3°37′31″W		C(S)	2186	Upload Photo
Logie House, Garage (Motor House)			57°32′03″N 3°39′40″W		B	2192	Upload Photo
Edinkillie House (Former Edinkillie Church Of Scotland Manse)			57°29′55″N 3°38′10″W		A	2188	Upload another image See more images
Logie Bridge Over River Divie			57°31′38″N 3°39′56″W		B	2190	Upload another image See more images
Logie House			57°32′11″N 3°39′40″W		B	2191	Upload another image See more images
Dunphail House			57°30′35″N 3°39′14″W		A	2171	Upload Photo
Edinkillie Parish Church (Church Of Scotland), Watch House And Burial Ground			57°29′55″N 3°38′15″W		B	2187	Upload Photo
Berryley Farmhouse And Steading			57°35′03″N 3°40′30″W		C(S)	2159	Upload Photo
38 Conicavel, Bunties			57°33′34″N 3°40′51″W		C(S)	2162	Upload Photo
Newton Of Darnaway Farmhouse			57°33′44″N 3°41′32″W		B	2194	Upload Photo
Bridge Of Knocklach Over Knocklach Burn			57°29′13″N 3°39′22″W		C(S)	2161	Upload another image
41, 41B Conicavel			57°33′35″N 3°40′50″W		B	2163	Upload Photo
Dounduff Farmhouse			57°31′27″N 3°40′57″W		C(S)	2168	Upload Photo
44, 45 Conicavel			57°33′37″N 3°40′47″W		B	2165	Upload Photo
Dunphail Mains Farmhouse And Former Cartshed/Grannary			57°30′50″N 3°39′22″W		B	2172	Upload Photo
Sluie Lodge			57°33′05″N 3°39′05″W		B	2195	Upload Photo
Daltullich Bridge Over River Findhorn			57°31′05″N 3°41′39″W		B	2166	Upload another image See more images
Dava Bridge Over Dorback Burn			57°25′49″N 3°39′34″W		C(S)	2167	Upload another image See more images
Edinkillie Bridge Over River Divie (Bridge Of Divie)			57°29′55″N 3°38′18″W		B	2185	Upload another image
Logie House, North Lodge And Gatepiers			57°32′37″N 3°39′13″W		C(S)	2193	Upload Photo
Braemoray Lodge			57°27′53″N 3°40′20″W		C(S)	2160	Upload Photo

== Key ==
The scheme for classifying buildings in Scotland is:

- Category A: "buildings of national or international importance, either architectural or historic; or fine, little-altered examples of some particular period, style or building type."
- Category B: "buildings of regional or more than local importance; or major examples of some particular period, style or building type, which may have been altered."
- Category C: "buildings of local importance; lesser examples of any period, style, or building type, as originally constructed or moderately altered; and simple traditional buildings which group well with other listed buildings."

In March 2016 there were 47,288 listed buildings in Scotland. Of these, 8% were Category A, and 50% were Category B, with the remaining 42% being Category C.

== See also ==
- List of listed buildings in Moray
