= List of listed buildings in St Andrews-Lhanbryd, Moray =

This is a list of listed buildings in the parish of Lhanbryde in Moray, Scotland.

== List ==
| Name | Location | Date Listed | Grid Ref. (Note: Sometimes known as OSGB36, the grid reference (where provided) is based on the British national grid reference system used by the Ordnance Survey. • "Guide to National Grid". Ordnance Survey. • "Get-a-map". Ordnance Survey.) | Geo-coordinates | Notes | LB Number (Note: Historic Environment Scotland assign a unique alphanumeric identifier to each designated site in Scotland, for listed buildings this always begins with "LB", for example "LB12345".) | Image |
|---|---|---|---|---|---|---|---|
| Kilcluan (Former C Of S Manse), Steading And Walled Garden | | | | 57°38′38″N 3°14′41″W | Category B | 17438 | Upload Photo |
| Coxton Tower House | | | | 57°37′49″N 3°14′16″W | Category C(S) | 15775 | Upload Photo |
| Pittensair | | | | 57°37′49″N 3°12′13″W | Category A | 15803 | Upload Photo |
| Inchbroom House | | | | 57°41′08″N 3°15′11″W | Category B | 15776 | Upload Photo |
| Pitgaveny House, Walled Garden | | | | 57°40′11″N 3°16′32″W | Category C(S) | 15800 | Upload Photo |
| Linkwood House Including Ancillary Building, Boundary Walls, Gatepiers And Gates | | | | 57°38′10″N 3°17′09″W | Category C(S) | 50086 | Upload Photo |
| Pitairlie Farmhouse | | | | 57°40′18″N 3°15′51″W | Category C(S) | 15798 | Upload Photo |
| Pitgaveny House, Main Entrance Gatepiers | | | | 57°40′01″N 3°16′36″W | Category B | 15801 | Upload Photo |
| Lhanbryde, 1,3 St Andrew's Road | | | | 57°38′08″N 3°13′28″W | Category C(S) | 17439 | Upload Photo |
| Coxton Tower | | | | 57°37′50″N 3°14′16″W | Category A | 15774 | Upload Photo |
| Pitgaveny House And Gatepiers Flanking Old Drive Way At North West | | | | 57°40′16″N 3°16′31″W | Category B | 15799 | Upload Photo |
| Kirkhill Burial Ground | | | | 57°38′53″N 3°15′34″W | Category C(S) | 15777 | Upload Photo |
| Lhanbryde Burial Ground, Innes Enclosure | | | | 57°38′07″N 3°13′17″W | Category A | 15797 | Upload Photo |
| Pitgaveny House, Dovecot | | | | 57°40′09″N 3°16′36″W | Category B | 15802 | Upload Photo |
| Sheriffston | | | | 57°38′25″N 3°14′55″W | Category B | 15804 | Upload Photo |
| Calcots Bridge Over River Lossie | | | | 57°39′27″N 3°15′06″W | Category B | 15773 | Upload Photo |
| Lhanbryde Burial Ground | | | | 57°38′07″N 3°13′18″W | Category B | 15778 | Upload Photo |

== Key ==
The scheme for classifying buildings in Scotland is:

- Category A: "buildings of national or international importance, either architectural or historic; or fine, little-altered examples of some particular period, style or building type."
- Category B: "buildings of regional or more than local importance; or major examples of some particular period, style or building type, which may have been altered."
- Category C: "buildings of local importance; lesser examples of any period, style, or building type, as originally constructed or moderately altered; and simple traditional buildings which group well with other listed buildings."

In March 2016 there were 47,288 listed buildings in Scotland. Of these, 8% were Category A, and 50% were Category B, with the remaining 42% being Category C.

== See also ==
- List of listed buildings in Moray
