= List of listed buildings in Findochty, Moray =

This is a list of listed buildings in the parish of Findochty in Moray, Scotland.

== List ==
Name	Location	Date Listed	Grid Ref. (Note: Sometimes known as OSGB36, the grid reference (where provided) is based on the British national grid reference system used by the Ordnance Survey. • "Guide to National Grid". Ordnance Survey. • "Get-a-map". Ordnance Survey.)	Geo-coordinates	Notes	LB Number (Note: Historic Environment Scotland assign a unique alphanumeric identifier to each designated site in Scotland, for listed buildings this always begins with "LB", for example "LB12345".)	Image
11, 13 Mid Street				57°41′45″N 2°54′28″W	Category B	31397	Upload Photo
2 Mid Street				57°41′47″N 2°54′30″W	Category C(S)	31399	Upload Photo
12, 14 Mid Street				57°41′44″N 2°54′29″W	Category B	31404	Upload Photo
4 Netherton Terrace				57°41′47″N 2°54′32″W	Category B	31407	Upload Photo
10 Netherton Terrace				57°41′47″N 2°54′30″W	Category B	31409	Upload Photo
6 New Street				57°42′02″N 2°53′59″W	Category B	31426	Upload Photo
12 New Street				57°42′00″N 2°53′58″W	Category B	31429	Upload Photo
13, 15 North Blantyre Street				57°41′56″N 2°54′02″W	Category C(S)	31441	Upload Photo
10 North Blantyre Street				57°41′57″N 2°54′03″W	Category C(S)	31445	Upload Photo
14 Seafield Street				57°41′42″N 2°54′31″W	Category C(S)	31462	Upload Photo
Commercial Street, K6 Telephone Kiosk				57°41′52″N 2°54′06″W	Category B	31477	Upload Photo
9, 11 Burnside Street				57°41′45″N 2°54′25″W	Category C(S)	31365	Upload Photo
2 Burnside Street				57°41′47″N 2°54′27″W	Category B	31366	Upload Photo
16 Castle Street, Daisybank				57°41′44″N 2°54′39″W	Category B	31384	Upload Photo
4 Chapel Street				57°41′50″N 2°54′18″W	Category B	31385	Upload Photo
7, 9 Mid Street				57°41′46″N 2°54′28″W	Category C(S)	31396	Upload Photo
15, 17 Mid Street				57°41′43″N 2°54′28″W	Category C(S)	31398	Upload Photo
17 New Street				57°41′58″N 2°53′55″W	Category C(S)	31422	Upload Photo
21 New Street, Rock House				57°41′57″N 2°53′56″W	Category C(S)	31424	Upload Photo
18 New Street				57°41′59″N 2°53′57″W	Category B	31431	Upload Photo
20 New Street				57°41′59″N 2°53′57″W	Category C(S)	31432	Upload Photo
13 Seafield Street, Lystra				57°41′44″N 2°54′30″W	Category C(S)	31454	Upload Photo
15 Seafield Street				57°41′43″N 2°54′30″W	Category C(S)	31455	Upload Photo
8 Seafield Street				57°41′44″N 2°54′31″W	Category B	31459	Upload Photo
5, 7 South Blantyre Street				57°41′55″N 2°54′03″W	Category C(S)	31468	Upload Photo
10 South Blantyre Street				57°41′55″N 2°54′02″W	Category B	31473	Upload Photo
12, 14 South Blantyre Street				57°41′56″N 2°54′01″W	Category B	31474	Upload Photo
1, 3 Burnside Street				57°41′46″N 2°54′26″W	Category C(S)	31363	Upload Photo
5, 7 Burnside Street				57°41′46″N 2°54′26″W	Category C(S)	31364	Upload Photo
4, 6 Burnside Street				57°41′46″N 2°54′27″W	Category C(S)	31367	Upload Photo
8, 10 Burnside Street				57°41′45″N 2°54′26″W	Category C(S)	31368	Upload Photo
12, 14 Burnside Street				57°41′44″N 2°54′26″W	Category C(S)	31369	Upload Photo
14 Castle Street, Hazelhurst				57°41′44″N 2°54′38″W	Category B	31383	Upload Photo
5 Chapel Street				57°41′50″N 2°54′17″W	Category B	31386	Upload Photo
6 Chapel Street				57°41′50″N 2°54′17″W	Category B	31387	Upload Photo
1, 2 Church Street				57°41′58″N 2°54′06″W	Category C(S)	31389	Upload Photo
5 Church Street				57°41′59″N 2°54′03″W	Category B	31391	Upload Photo
7 Church Street				57°41′59″N 2°54′02″W	Category B	31393	Upload Photo
14 Netherton Terrace				57°41′48″N 2°54′28″W	Category B	31411	Upload Photo
3 New Street				57°42′02″N 2°53′58″W	Category C(S)	31415	Upload Photo
5 New Street				57°42′01″N 2°53′58″W	Category C(S)	31416	Upload Photo
8 North Blantyre Street				57°41′57″N 2°54′04″W	Category C(S)	31444	Upload Photo
3 Seafield Street				57°41′46″N 2°54′31″W	Category C(S)	31449	Upload Photo
11 Seafield Street				57°41′44″N 2°54′31″W	Category C(S)	31453	Upload Photo
6 Seafield Street				57°41′44″N 2°54′32″W	Category C(S)	31458	Upload Photo
12 Seafield Street				57°41′43″N 2°54′31″W	Category B	31461	Upload Photo
2 South Blantyre Street				57°41′54″N 2°54′04″W	Category C(S)	31469	Upload Photo
6 South Blantyre Street				57°41′55″N 2°54′03″W	Category B	31471	Upload Photo
8 South Blantyre Street				57°41′55″N 2°54′02″W	Category C(S)	31472	Upload Photo
1 Castle Street				57°41′45″N 2°54′34″W	Category C(S)	31370	Upload Photo
5 Castle Street				57°41′44″N 2°54′35″W	Category B	31372	Upload Photo
12 Castle Street, Rosemount				57°41′44″N 2°54′37″W	Category B	31382	Upload Photo
16 Mid Street				57°41′43″N 2°54′29″W	Category C(S)	31405	Upload Photo
13 New Street				57°41′59″N 2°53′56″W	Category C(S)	31420	Upload Photo
4 New Street				57°42′02″N 2°53′59″W	Category B	31425	Upload Photo
16 New Street				57°42′00″N 2°53′57″W	Category B	31430	Upload Photo
9,11 North Blantyre Street				57°41′57″N 2°54′02″W	Category C(S)	31440	Upload Photo
3 Siller Street				57°42′01″N 2°53′59″W	Category C(S)	31463	Upload Photo
4 South Blantyre Street				57°41′54″N 2°54′03″W	Category B	31470	Upload Photo
33 Sterlochy Street				57°42′01″N 2°54′08″W	Category B	31476	Upload Photo
9 Castle Street				57°41′44″N 2°54′37″W	Category B	31374	Upload Photo
6 Church Street				57°42′00″N 2°54′02″W	Category C(S)	31392	Upload Photo
6 Mid Street				57°41′46″N 2°54′29″W	Category C(S)	31401	Upload Photo
10 Mid Street				57°41′45″N 2°54′29″W	Category B	31403	Upload Photo
12 Netherton Terrace				57°41′47″N 2°54′29″W	Category C(S)	31410	Upload Photo
1 New Street				57°42′02″N 2°53′58″W	Category B	31414	Upload Photo
7 New Street				57°42′01″N 2°53′57″W	Category C(S)	31417	Upload Photo
19 New Street				57°41′58″N 2°53′54″W	Category C(S)	31423	Upload Photo
24 New Street				57°41′58″N 2°53′57″W	Category C(S)	31434	Upload Photo
28 New Street				57°41′58″N 2°53′59″W	Category C(S)	31436	Upload Photo
7 Seafield Street				57°41′45″N 2°54′31″W	Category C(S)	31451	Upload Photo
29 Sterlochy Street				57°42′00″N 2°54′10″W	Category B	31475	Upload Photo
3 Castle Street				57°41′45″N 2°54′34″W	Category B	31371	Upload Photo
7 Castle Street, Kelvin Grove				57°41′44″N 2°54′36″W	Category C(S)	31373	Upload Photo
8 Castle Street				57°41′45″N 2°54′35″W	Category B	31380	Upload Photo
10 Castle Street, Westfield				57°41′45″N 2°54′36″W	Category B	31381	Upload Photo
4 Mid Street				57°41′46″N 2°54′30″W	Category B	31400	Upload Photo
6, 8 Netherton Terrace				57°41′47″N 2°54′31″W	Category B	31408	Upload Photo
16 Netherton Terrace, Penryn				57°41′47″N 2°54′27″W	Category B	31412	Upload Photo
9 New Street				57°42′00″N 2°53′57″W	Category B	31418	Upload Photo
2,4 North Blantyre Street				57°41′58″N 2°54′04″W	Category C(S)	31442	Upload Photo
12 North Blantyre Street				57°41′57″N 2°54′03″W	Category B	31446	Upload Photo
5 Seafield Street				57°41′45″N 2°54′31″W	Category C(S)	31450	Upload Photo
10 Seafield Street				57°41′43″N 2°54′31″W	Category C(S)	31460	Upload Photo
2 Siller Street				57°42′02″N 2°54′00″W	Category C(S)	31465	Upload Photo
11 Castle Street				57°41′43″N 2°54′38″W	Category B	31375	Upload Photo
13 Castle Street				57°41′43″N 2°54′39″W	Category C(S)	31376	Upload Photo
2 Castle Street				57°41′46″N 2°54′33″W	Category C(S)	31377	Upload Photo
3, 4 Church Street				57°41′59″N 2°54′04″W	Category B	31390	Upload Photo
5 Mid Street				57°41′46″N 2°54′28″W	Category C(S)	31395	Upload Photo
8 Mid Street				57°41′45″N 2°54′29″W	Category C(S)	31402	Upload Photo
15 New Street				57°41′59″N 2°53′56″W	Category C(S)	31421	Upload Photo
26 New Street				57°41′58″N 2°53′58″W	Category C(S)	31435	Upload Photo
5 North Blantyre Street				57°41′58″N 2°54′03″W	Category C(S)	31438	Upload Photo
7 North Blantyre Street				57°41′58″N 2°54′03″W	Category C(S)	31439	Upload Photo
14 North Blantyre Street				57°41′56″N 2°54′03″W	Category C(S)	31447	Upload Photo
1 Seafield Street				57°41′46″N 2°54′31″W	Category B	31448	Upload Photo
9 Seafield Street				57°41′44″N 2°54′31″W	Category C(S)	31452	Upload Photo
2 Seafield Street				57°41′45″N 2°54′32″W	Category C(S)	31456	Upload Photo
4 Siller Street				57°42′01″N 2°53′59″W	Category B	31466	Upload Photo
1, 3 South Blantyre Street				57°41′55″N 2°54′04″W	Category C(S)	31467	Upload Photo
4 Castle Street				57°41′46″N 2°54′34″W	Category C(S)	31378	Upload Photo
Church Street, Church Of Scotland				57°42′00″N 2°54′06″W	Category C(S)	31388	Upload Photo
2 Netherton Terrace				57°41′47″N 2°54′33″W	Category C(S)	31406	Upload Photo
18 Netherton Terrace, Firth View				57°41′47″N 2°54′26″W	Category B	31413	Upload Photo
11 New Street				57°42′00″N 2°53′56″W	Category B	31419	Upload Photo
8 New Street				57°42′01″N 2°53′58″W	Category B	31427	Upload Photo
10 New Street				57°42′01″N 2°53′58″W	Category B	31428	Upload Photo
22 New Street				57°41′58″N 2°53′56″W	Category B	31433	Upload Photo
1, 3 North Blantyre Street				57°41′59″N 2°54′03″W	Category C(S)	31437	Upload Photo
6 North Blantyre Street				57°41′58″N 2°54′04″W	Category B	31443	Upload Photo
4 Seafield Street				57°41′45″N 2°54′32″W	Category C(S)	31457	Upload Photo
5 Siller Street				57°42′00″N 2°53′58″W	Category B	31464	Upload Photo
6 Castle Street				57°41′45″N 2°54′35″W	Category B	31379	Upload Photo
1, 3 Mid Street				57°41′47″N 2°54′28″W	Category C(S)	31394	Upload Photo

== Key ==
The scheme for classifying buildings in Scotland is:

- Category A: "buildings of national or international importance, either architectural or historic; or fine, little-altered examples of some particular period, style or building type."
- Category B: "buildings of regional or more than local importance; or major examples of some particular period, style or building type, which may have been altered."
- Category C: "buildings of local importance; lesser examples of any period, style, or building type, as originally constructed or moderately altered; and simple traditional buildings which group well with other listed buildings."

In March 2016 there were 47,288 listed buildings in Scotland. Of these, 8% were Category A, and 50% were Category B, with the remaining 42% being Category C.

== See also ==
- List of listed buildings in Moray
