= List of listed buildings in Duffus, Moray =

This is a list of listed buildings in the parish of Duffus in Moray, Scotland.

== List ==
Name	Location	Date Listed	Grid Ref. (Note: Sometimes known as OSGB36, the grid reference (where provided) is based on the British national grid reference system used by the Ordnance Survey. • "Guide to National Grid". Ordnance Survey. • "Get-a-map". Ordnance Survey.)	Geo-coordinates	Notes	LB Number (Note: Historic Environment Scotland assign a unique alphanumeric identifier to each designated site in Scotland, for listed buildings this always begins with "LB", for example "LB12345".)	Image
Duffus Village, Parish Church (Church Of Scotland)				57°41′58″N 3°23′48″W	Category B	2290	Upload Photo
Duffus Old Parish Church (Peter Kirk), Parish Cross, Morthouse And Burial Ground				57°42′00″N 3°23′08″W	Category A	2307	Upload Photo
Duffus Village, The Well House				57°42′03″N 3°23′30″W	Category B	2291	Upload Photo
Glebe House (Former Church Of Scotland Manse) And Walled Garden				57°41′33″N 3°24′05″W	Category B	2308	Upload Photo
Greenbrae And Garden Wall				57°42′14″N 3°26′46″W	Category C(S)	2310	Upload Photo
Duffus, Old Manse				57°42′04″N 3°22′58″W	Category B	2289	Upload Photo
Hopeman, Harbour Street, Icehouse				57°42′31″N 3°26′07″W	Category B	2311	Upload Photo
Hopeman Lodge				57°42′36″N 3°25′29″W	Category C(S)	2312	Upload Photo
Inverugie House				57°41′55″N 3°25′26″W	Category B	2313	Upload Photo
Gordonstoun, Cumming House				57°42′11″N 3°22′29″W	Category B	2309	Upload Photo

== Key ==
The scheme for classifying buildings in Scotland is:

- Category A: "buildings of national or international importance, either architectural or historic; or fine, little-altered examples of some particular period, style or building type."
- Category B: "buildings of regional or more than local importance; or major examples of some particular period, style or building type, which may have been altered."
- Category C: "buildings of local importance; lesser examples of any period, style, or building type, as originally constructed or moderately altered; and simple traditional buildings which group well with other listed buildings."

In March 2016 there were 47,288 listed buildings in Scotland. Of these, 8% were Category A, and 50% were Category B, with the remaining 42% being Category C.

== See also ==
- List of listed buildings in Moray
