= List of listed buildings in Burghead, Moray =

This is a list of listed buildings in the parish of Burghead in Moray, Scotland.

== List ==
Name	Location	Date Listed	Grid Ref. (Note: Sometimes known as OSGB36, the grid reference (where provided) is based on the British national grid reference system used by the Ordnance Survey. • "Guide to National Grid". Ordnance Survey. • "Get-a-map". Ordnance Survey.)	Geo-coordinates	Notes	LB Number (Note: Historic Environment Scotland assign a unique alphanumeric identifier to each designated site in Scotland, for listed buildings this always begins with "LB", for example "LB12345".)	Image
Coastguard Station, Bonnieview And Coast Guard Rescue Equipment Store				57°42′11″N 3°29′52″W	Category B	22740	Upload Photo
Station Road Granary				57°41′59″N 3°29′18″W	Category B	22750	Upload Photo
Clavie Stone				57°42′11″N 3°29′44″W	Category C(S)	22739	Upload Photo
57 Granary Street				57°42′07″N 3°29′40″W	Category B	22742	Upload Photo
Storm Signal To N Of Harbour				57°42′13″N 3°29′52″W	Category C(S)	46516	Upload Photo
66 Granary Street				57°42′07″N 3°29′40″W	Category C(S)	22743	Upload Photo
Granary Street, Masonic Hall				57°42′06″N 3°29′33″W	Category B	22741	Upload Photo
Harbour North Pier				57°42′08″N 3°29′53″W	Category B	22749	Upload Photo
Granary Street, Telford House Flats 1, 2, 3 And 4				57°42′10″N 3°29′52″W	Category A	22747	Upload Photo
Grant Street, Old Burial Ground				57°42′10″N 3°29′41″W	Category C(S)	22748	Upload Photo
72 Granary Street				57°42′07″N 3°29′43″W	Category C(S)	22744	Upload Photo
1-8 North Quay, Granary House (Former Warehouse)				57°42′09″N 3°29′50″W	Category C(S)	22745	Upload Photo

== Key ==
The scheme for classifying buildings in Scotland is:

- Category A: "buildings of national or international importance, either architectural or historic; or fine, little-altered examples of some particular period, style or building type."
- Category B: "buildings of regional or more than local importance; or major examples of some particular period, style or building type, which may have been altered."
- Category C: "buildings of local importance; lesser examples of any period, style, or building type, as originally constructed or moderately altered; and simple traditional buildings which group well with other listed buildings."

In March 2016 there were 47,288 listed buildings in Scotland. Of these, 8% were Category A, and 50% were Category B, with the remaining 42% being Category C.

== See also ==
- List of listed buildings in Moray
