= List of listed buildings in Portknockie, Moray =

This is a list of listed buildings in the parish of Portknockie in Moray, Scotland.

== List ==
Name	Location	Date Listed	Grid Ref. (Note: Sometimes known as OSGB36, the grid reference (where provided) is based on the British national grid reference system used by the Ordnance Survey. • "Guide to National Grid". Ordnance Survey. • "Get-a-map". Ordnance Survey.)	Geo-coordinates	Notes	LB Number (Note: Historic Environment Scotland assign a unique alphanumeric identifier to each designated site in Scotland, for listed buildings this always begins with "LB", for example "LB12345".)	Image
3 Seafield Street				57°42′08″N 2°51′24″W	Category B	40166	Upload Photo
33 Seafield Street				57°42′16″N 2°51′24″W	Category C(S)	40181	Upload Photo
4 Seafield Street				57°42′08″N 2°51′23″W	Category B	40183	Upload Photo
16 Seafield Street				57°42′11″N 2°51′23″W	Category C(S)	40189	Upload Photo
24 Seafield Street				57°42′14″N 2°51′23″W	Category C(S)	40193	Upload Photo
30 Seafield Street				57°42′15″N 2°51′23″W	Category C(S)	40196	Upload Photo
34 Seafield Street				57°42′16″N 2°51′23″W	Category C(S)	40198	Upload Photo
6 Station Road				57°42′09″N 2°51′52″W	Category C(S)	40201	Upload Photo
10 Station Road				57°42′08″N 2°51′53″W	Category B	40203	Upload Photo
2 Admiralty Street				57°42′07″N 2°51′20″W	Category C(S)	40096	Upload Photo
17 Church Street				57°42′09″N 2°51′38″W	Category C(S)	40107	Upload Photo
23, 25 Church Street				57°42′09″N 2°51′40″W	Category C(S)	40109	Upload Photo
5 High Street				57°42′07″N 2°51′31″W	Category B	40128	Upload Photo
25 High Street, Rose Villa				57°42′08″N 2°51′41″W	Category B	40132	Upload Photo
5 Pulteney Street				57°42′10″N 2°51′37″W	Category C(S)	40152	Upload Photo
25 Seafield Street				57°42′14″N 2°51′24″W	Category C(S)	40177	Upload Photo
6 Seafield Street				57°42′09″N 2°51′23″W	Category B	40184	Upload Photo
14 Seafield Street, Church Of Christ				57°42′11″N 2°51′23″W	Category C(S)	40188	Upload Photo
22 Seafield Street				57°42′13″N 2°51′23″W	Category C(S)	40192	Upload Photo
5 Admiralty Street				57°42′08″N 2°51′21″W	Category B	40205	Upload Photo
3 Admiralty Street				57°42′08″N 2°51′21″W	Category C(S)	40090	Upload Photo
9 Admiralty Street				57°42′09″N 2°51′21″W	Category B	40092	Upload Photo
11 Admiralty Street				57°42′10″N 2°51′21″W	Category B	40093	Upload Photo
13 Admiralty Street				57°42′10″N 2°51′21″W	Category C(S)	40094	Upload Photo
4 Admiralty Street				57°42′07″N 2°51′20″W	Category C(S)	40097	Upload Photo
8 Admiralty Street				57°42′08″N 2°51′20″W	Category B	40099	Upload Photo
31, 33 Church Street				57°42′10″N 2°51′44″W	Category C(S)	40110	Upload Photo
1, 2 Cliff Terrace				57°42′12″N 2°51′46″W	Category C(S)	40123	Upload Photo
20 High Street				57°42′08″N 2°51′38″W	Category B	40139	Upload Photo
34, 36 High Street				57°42′09″N 2°51′44″W	Category C(S)	40145	Upload Photo
17 Pulteney Street				57°42′11″N 2°51′44″W	Category C(S)	40158	Upload Photo
19 Pulteney Street				57°42′11″N 2°51′45″W	Category C(S)	40159	Upload Photo
21 Pulteney Street				57°42′11″N 2°51′46″W	Category C(S)	40160	Upload Photo
3 Seafield Terrace				57°42′06″N 2°51′21″W	Category C(S)	40163	Upload Photo
11 Seafield Street				57°42′10″N 2°51′24″W	Category C(S)	40170	Upload Photo
13 Seafield Street				57°42′11″N 2°51′24″W	Category B	40171	Upload Photo
19 Seafield Street				57°42′12″N 2°51′24″W	Category C(S)	40174	Upload Photo
23 Seafield Street				57°42′13″N 2°51′24″W	Category C(S)	40176	Upload Photo
29 Seafield Street				57°42′15″N 2°51′24″W	Category C(S)	40179	Upload Photo
8 Seafield Street				57°42′09″N 2°51′23″W	Category C(S)	40185	Upload Photo
12 Station Road				57°42′08″N 2°51′54″W	Category C(S)	40204	Upload Photo
15 Admiralty Street				57°42′11″N 2°51′21″W	Category B	40095	Upload Photo
6 Admiralty Street				57°42′08″N 2°51′20″W	Category C(S)	40098	Upload Photo
22 Admiralty Street				57°42′12″N 2°51′20″W	Category C(S)	40106	Upload Photo
35, 37 Church Street				57°42′10″N 2°51′46″W	Category C(S)	40111	Upload Photo
30 Church Street				57°42′10″N 2°51′41″W	Category C(S)	40117	Upload Photo
3 High Street				57°42′07″N 2°51′30″W	Category C(S)	40127	Upload Photo
12 Hill Street				57°42′08″N 2°51′37″W	Category B	40150	Upload Photo
9 Patrol Place, Store (Former Fishermen's Hall)				57°42′17″N 2°51′35″W	Category C(S)	40151	Upload Photo
13 Pulteney Street				57°42′10″N 2°51′41″W	Category B	40156	Upload Photo
4 Seafield Terrace				57°42′06″N 2°51′20″W	Category C(S)	40164	Upload Photo
10 Seafield Street				57°42′10″N 2°51′23″W	Category B	40186	Upload Photo
20 Seafield Street				57°42′12″N 2°51′23″W	Category C(S)	40191	Upload Photo
10 Admiralty Street				57°42′09″N 2°51′20″W	Category C(S)	40100	Upload Photo
18 Admiralty Street				57°42′11″N 2°51′20″W	Category C(S)	40104	Upload Photo
Church Street, Church Of Scotland				57°42′10″N 2°51′36″W	Category C(S)	40112	Upload Photo
24 Church Street				57°42′10″N 2°51′38″W	Category C(S)	40114	Upload Photo
28 Church Street				57°42′10″N 2°51′40″W	Category C(S)	40116	Upload Photo
36 Church Street				57°42′10″N 2°51′45″W	Category C(S)	40120	Upload Photo
40 Church Street				57°42′10″N 2°51′47″W	Category C(S)	40122	Upload Photo
3, 4 Cliff Terrace				57°42′11″N 2°51′48″W	Category C(S)	40124	Upload Photo
12 High Street				57°42′08″N 2°51′33″W	Category C(S)	40135	Upload Photo
16 High Street				57°42′08″N 2°51′35″W	Category C(S)	40137	Upload Photo
18 High Street				57°42′08″N 2°51′37″W	Category B	40138	Upload Photo
38, 40 High Street				57°42′09″N 2°51′45″W	Category C(S)	40146	Upload Photo
15 Pulteney Street				57°42′10″N 2°51′43″W	Category C(S)	40157	Upload Photo
1 Seafield Terrace				57°42′07″N 2°51′24″W	Category C(S)	40161	Upload Photo
5 Seafield Street				57°42′09″N 2°51′24″W	Category B	40167	Upload Photo
2 Seafield Street				57°42′08″N 2°51′23″W	Category C(S)	40182	Upload Photo
4 Station Road				57°42′09″N 2°51′51″W	Category C(S)	40200	Upload Photo
16 Admiralty Street				57°42′10″N 2°51′20″W	Category C(S)	40103	Upload Photo
19, 21 Church Street				57°42′09″N 2°51′39″W	Category C(S)	40108	Upload Photo
22 Church Street				57°42′10″N 2°51′37″W	Category C(S)	40113	Upload Photo
10 High Street				57°42′08″N 2°51′32″W	Category C(S)	40134	Upload Photo
8 Hill Street				57°42′07″N 2°51′36″W	Category C(S)	40149	Upload Photo
2 Seafield Terrace				57°42′07″N 2°51′23″W	Category C(S)	40162	Upload Photo
1 Seafield Street				57°42′07″N 2°51′24″W	Category C(S)	40165	Upload Photo
17 Seafield Street				57°42′12″N 2°51′24″W	Category C(S)	40173	Upload Photo
31 Seafield Street				57°42′15″N 2°51′24″W	Category C(S)	40180	Upload Photo
12 Seafield Street				57°42′10″N 2°51′23″W	Category B	40187	Upload Photo
18 Seafield Street				57°42′12″N 2°51′23″W	Category B	40190	Upload Photo
28 Seafield Street				57°42′14″N 2°51′23″W	Category B	40195	Upload Photo
12 Admiralty Street				57°42′09″N 2°51′20″W	Category C(S)	40101	Upload Photo
34 Church Street				57°42′10″N 2°51′44″W	Category C(S)	40119	Upload Photo
5, 6 Cliff Terrace				57°42′11″N 2°51′49″W	Category C(S)	40125	Upload Photo
11 High Street				57°42′07″N 2°51′33″W	Category C(S)	40131	Upload Photo
22, 24 High Street				57°42′08″N 2°51′39″W	Category C(S)	40140	Upload Photo
15 Hill Street				57°42′07″N 2°51′37″W	Category C(S)	40147	Upload Photo
7 Pulteney Street				57°42′10″N 2°51′38″W	Category C(S)	40153	Upload Photo
7 Seafield Street				57°42′09″N 2°51′24″W	Category C(S)	40168	Upload Photo
15 Seafield Street				57°42′11″N 2°51′24″W	Category C(S)	40172	Upload Photo
32 Seafield Street				57°42′16″N 2°51′23″W	Category C(S)	40197	Upload Photo
2 Station Road				57°42′10″N 2°51′50″W	Category C(S)	40199	Upload Photo
8 Station Road				57°42′09″N 2°51′52″W	Category B	40202	Upload Photo
14 Admiralty Street				57°42′10″N 2°51′20″W	Category C(S)	40102	Upload Photo
20 Admiralty Street				57°42′12″N 2°51′20″W	Category B	40105	Upload Photo
26 Church Street				57°42′10″N 2°51′39″W	Category C(S)	40115	Upload Photo
38 Church Street				57°42′10″N 2°51′46″W	Category C(S)	40121	Upload Photo
7 High Street				57°42′07″N 2°51′32″W	Category C(S)	40129	Upload Photo
14 High Street				57°42′08″N 2°51′34″W	Category B	40136	Upload Photo
26 High Street				57°42′08″N 2°51′41″W	Category C(S)	40141	Upload Photo
30 High Street				57°42′09″N 2°51′42″W	Category C(S)	40143	Upload Photo
32 High Street				57°42′09″N 2°51′43″W	Category C(S)	40144	Upload Photo
6 Hill Street				57°42′07″N 2°51′36″W	Category B	40148	Upload Photo
9 Pulteney Street				57°42′10″N 2°51′39″W	Category C(S)	40154	Upload Photo
11 Pulteney Street				57°42′10″N 2°51′40″W	Category C(S)	40155	Upload Photo
9 Seafield Street				57°42′10″N 2°51′24″W	Category C(S)	40169	Upload Photo
21 Seafield Street				57°42′13″N 2°51′24″W	Category C(S)	40175	Upload Photo
27 Seafield Street				57°42′14″N 2°51′24″W	Category C(S)	40178	Upload Photo
26 Seafield Street				57°42′14″N 2°51′23″W	Category B	40194	Upload Photo
1 Admiralty Street				57°42′07″N 2°51′21″W	Category C(S)	40089	Upload Photo
7 Admiralty Street				57°42′09″N 2°51′21″W	Category C(S)	40091	Upload Photo
32 Church Street				57°42′10″N 2°51′43″W	Category C(S)	40118	Upload Photo
1 High Street				57°42′07″N 2°51′28″W	Category C(S)	40126	Upload Photo
9 High Street				57°42′07″N 2°51′32″W	Category C(S)	40130	Upload Photo
8 High Street				57°42′08″N 2°51′31″W	Category C(S)	40133	Upload Photo
28 High Street, Meeting Hall				57°42′08″N 2°51′42″W	Category C(S)	40142	Upload Photo

== Key ==
The scheme for classifying buildings in Scotland is:

- Category A: "buildings of national or international importance, either architectural or historic; or fine, little-altered examples of some particular period, style or building type."
- Category B: "buildings of regional or more than local importance; or major examples of some particular period, style or building type, which may have been altered."
- Category C: "buildings of local importance; lesser examples of any period, style, or building type, as originally constructed or moderately altered; and simple traditional buildings which group well with other listed buildings."

In March 2016 there were 47,288 listed buildings in Scotland. Of these, 8% were Category A, and 50% were Category B, with the remaining 42% being Category C.

== See also ==
- List of listed buildings in Moray
