= List of listed buildings in Rathven, Moray =

This is a list of listed buildings in the parish of Rathven in Moray, Scotland.

== List ==
Name	Location	Date Listed	Grid Ref. (Note: Sometimes known as OSGB36, the grid reference (where provided) is based on the British national grid reference system used by the Ordnance Survey. • "Guide to National Grid". Ordnance Survey. • "Get-a-map". Ordnance Survey.)	Geo-coordinates	Notes	LB Number (Note: Historic Environment Scotland assign a unique alphanumeric identifier to each designated site in Scotland, for listed buildings this always begins with "LB", for example "LB12345".)	Image
Cairnfield House				57°38′53″N 2°58′57″W	Category A	15517	Upload Photo
Cullen House Walled Garden, Gardeners' Cottages, Rear Walled Garden And Garden House				57°40′39″N 2°50′03″W	Category B	15521	Upload Photo
Findochty Castle				57°41′34″N 2°54′54″W	Category B	15537	Upload Photo
Leitcheston Dovecot				57°38′54″N 3°00′29″W	Category A	15540	Upload Photo
Cullen House Home Farm				57°40′55″N 2°50′24″W	Category B	15518	Upload Photo
Rannas E And W Blocks, And Walled Garden				57°40′09″N 2°54′14″W	Category B	15526	Upload Photo
Letterfourie House And Fountains				57°38′49″N 2°55′46″W	Category A	15541	Upload Photo
Drybridge, Old Highland Railway Bridge				57°39′02″N 2°56′54″W	Category C(S)	50114	Upload Photo
Drybridge, Lairds Way Path Bridge Over Core Burn				57°38′55″N 2°56′57″W	Category C(S)	50115	Upload Photo
Drybridge, Corelinn Bridge				57°38′20″N 2°57′01″W	Category C(S)	50152	Upload Photo
Cullen House Policies, Marywell Cottage				57°41′08″N 2°50′28″W	Category C(S)	15519	Upload Photo
Preshome, St Gregory's Roman Catholic Church				57°38′21″N 2°59′24″W	Category A	15524	Upload Photo
Letterfourie, Walled Garden And Cottage				57°38′38″N 2°55′33″W	Category B	15545	Upload Photo
Arradoul House				57°39′33″N 2°58′25″W	Category C(S)	15513	Upload Photo
Portgordon 2 East High Street				57°39′50″N 3°00′47″W	Category C(S)	15522	Upload Photo
Rannas, Barn With Mill Wheel And Implement Shed				57°40′13″N 2°54′20″W	Category B	15527	Upload Photo
Rathven, Old School				57°40′40″N 2°55′58″W	Category B	15530	Upload Photo
Walkerdales				57°39′04″N 2°57′46″W	Category B	15533	Upload Photo
Drybridge, Smiddy				57°38′57″N 2°56′51″W	Category C(S)	18832	Upload Photo
Cullen House, Temple Of Pomona				57°41′32″N 2°49′58″W	Category A	15520	Upload Photo
Portknockie, Kirk House (Former Seafield Church Of Scotland) And Enclosing Walls				57°41′56″N 2°51′23″W	Category C(S)	15523	Upload Photo
Rathven Old Burial Ground And Rannas Aisle				57°40′38″N 2°56′07″W	Category B	15529	Upload Photo
Enzie Cross Roads, Sylvania (Former Free Church Manse)				57°38′52″N 3°01′00″W	Category C(S)	15536	Upload Photo
Greenbank Dovecot				57°38′19″N 2°56′07″W	Category B	15539	Upload Photo
Letterfourie, Craigmin Bridge over Burn Of Letterfourie				57°38′44″N 2°56′17″W	Category A	15542	Upload Photo
Letterfourie, Gatepiers And Gates At Main Entrance				57°39′05″N 2°56′06″W	Category C(S)	15543	Upload Photo
Portgordon, Gollachy Ice House				57°40′01″N 3°00′11″W	Category B	15546	Upload Photo
Birkenbush				57°38′51″N 2°58′01″W	Category B	15514	Upload Photo
Enzie Parish Church Of Scotland				57°38′28″N 3°00′45″W	Category B	15535	Upload Photo
Letterfourie, Granary				57°38′58″N 2°55′40″W	Category B	15544	Upload Photo
Tochieneal House				57°40′28″N 2°48′39″W	Category B	15532	Upload Photo
Bruntown House And Steading				57°41′17″N 2°50′46″W	Category B	15516	Upload Photo
Preshome, Chapel House, Garden Store And Wall Enclosing House, Garden And Church				57°38′21″N 2°59′18″W	Category A	15525	Upload Photo
Rathven Parish Church (Church Of Scotland)				57°40′40″N 2°55′59″W	Category B	15528	Upload Photo
Thornybank				57°38′40″N 2°57′42″W	Category B	15531	Upload Photo
Findochty Castle Cottage				57°41′34″N 2°54′54″W	Category C(S)	15538	Upload Photo

== Key ==
The scheme for classifying buildings in Scotland is:

- Category A: "buildings of national or international importance, either architectural or historic; or fine, little-altered examples of some particular period, style or building type."
- Category B: "buildings of regional or more than local importance; or major examples of some particular period, style or building type, which may have been altered."
- Category C: "buildings of local importance; lesser examples of any period, style, or building type, as originally constructed or moderately altered; and simple traditional buildings which group well with other listed buildings."

In March 2016 there were 47,288 listed buildings in Scotland. Of these, 8% were Category A, and 50% were Category B, with the remaining 42% being Category C.

== See also ==
- List of listed buildings in Moray
