= List of listed buildings in Grange, Moray =

This is a list of listed buildings in the parish of Grange in Moray, Scotland.

== List ==
| Name | Location | Date Listed | Grid Ref. (Note: Sometimes known as OSGB36, the grid reference (where provided) is based on the British national grid reference system used by the Ordnance Survey. • "Guide to National Grid". Ordnance Survey. • "Get-a-map". Ordnance Survey.) | Geo-coordinates | Notes | LB Number (Note: Historic Environment Scotland assign a unique alphanumeric identifier to each designated site in Scotland, for listed buildings this always begins with "LB", for example "LB12345".) | Image |
|---|---|---|---|---|---|---|---|
| Grange Burial Ground | | | | 57°33′05″N 2°52′19″W | Category C(S) | 8708 | Upload Photo |
| Edingight House And Screen Wall | | | | 57°35′32″N 2°48′31″W | Category B | 8706 | Upload Photo |
| Bridge Of Grange Over River Isla | | | | 57°33′06″N 2°52′39″W | Category B | 8709 | Upload Photo |
| Grange Parish Church (Church Of Scotland) And Enclosing Wall | | | | 57°33′04″N 2°52′11″W | Category C(S) | 8707 | Upload Photo |

== Key ==
The scheme for classifying buildings in Scotland is:

- Category A: "buildings of national or international importance, either architectural or historic; or fine, little-altered examples of some particular period, style or building type."
- Category B: "buildings of regional or more than local importance; or major examples of some particular period, style or building type, which may have been altered."
- Category C: "buildings of local importance; lesser examples of any period, style, or building type, as originally constructed or moderately altered; and simple traditional buildings which group well with other listed buildings."

In March 2016 there were 47,288 listed buildings in Scotland. Of these, 8% were Category A, and 50% were Category B, with the remaining 42% being Category C.

== See also ==
- List of listed buildings in Moray
