= List of listed buildings in Speymouth, Moray =

This is a list of listed buildings in the parish of Speymouth in Moray, Scotland.

== List ==
Name	Location	Date Listed	Grid Ref. (Note: Sometimes known as OSGB36, the grid reference (where provided) is based on the British national grid reference system used by the Ordnance Survey. • "Guide to National Grid". Ordnance Survey. • "Get-a-map". Ordnance Survey.)	Geo-coordinates	Notes	LB Number (Note: Historic Environment Scotland assign a unique alphanumeric identifier to each designated site in Scotland, for listed buildings this always begins with "LB", for example "LB12345".)	Image
Dipple Farm Laundry, Servants' Bothy And Dairy				57°36′36″N 3°07′32″W	Category C(S)	15640	Upload another image
Essil Burial Ground				57°39′22″N 3°06′30″W	Category C(S)	15641	Upload another image See more images
Newton Farmhouse				57°38′49″N 3°06′29″W	Category B	15643	Upload Photo
Dipple House				57°36′37″N 3°07′34″W	Category C(S)	46285	Upload another image
Mosstodloch, Cosy Corner				57°37′27″N 3°07′33″W	Category B	15642	Upload Photo
Orbliston Station House				57°36′32″N 3°09′58″W	Category B	15644	Upload another image See more images
Stynie Farmhouse And Garden Walls				57°37′53″N 3°06′52″W	Category B	15649	Upload another image
(Old) Spey Bridge				57°37′13″N 3°06′24″W	Category A	15645	Upload another image See more images
Spey Bridge, Old Toll House				57°37′14″N 3°06′25″W	Category B	15646	Upload another image
Speymouth Parish Church (Church Of Scotland) And Enclosing Walls				57°37′55″N 3°06′46″W	Category B	15647	Upload another image See more images
Dipple Burial Ground				57°36′22″N 3°07′32″W	Category C(S)	15639	Upload another image See more images
Crofts Of Dipple, Former Smithy				57°36′58″N 3°08′01″W	Category B	19471	Upload another image
Speymouth Old Manse				57°38′08″N 3°06′47″W	Category B	15648	Upload Photo

== Key ==
The scheme for classifying buildings in Scotland is:

- Category A: "buildings of national or international importance, either architectural or historic; or fine, little-altered examples of some particular period, style or building type."
- Category B: "buildings of regional or more than local importance; or major examples of some particular period, style or building type, which may have been altered."
- Category C: "buildings of local importance; lesser examples of any period, style, or building type, as originally constructed or moderately altered; and simple traditional buildings which group well with other listed buildings."

In March 2016 there were 47,288 listed buildings in Scotland. Of these, 8% were Category A, and 50% were Category B, with the remaining 42% being Category C.

== See also ==
- List of listed buildings in Moray
