= List of listed buildings in Urquhart, Moray =

This is a list of listed buildings in the parish of Urquhart in Moray, Scotland.

== List ==
Name	Location	Date listed	Grid ref. (Note: Sometimes known as OSGB36, the grid reference (where provided) is based on the British national grid reference system used by the Ordnance Survey. • "Guide to National Grid". Ordnance Survey. • "Get-a-map". Ordnance Survey.)	Geo-coordinates	Notes	LB number (Note: Historic Environment Scotland assign a unique alphanumeric identifier to each designated site in Scotland, for listed buildings this always begins with "LB", for example "LB12345".)	Image
Innes House, Home Farm				57°39′58″N 3°12′31″W	Category B	18187	Upload Photo
Garmouth, 1 And 2 Spey Street				57°39′58″N 3°06′26″W	Category C(S)	14857	Upload Photo
Garmouth, Spey Street, Eastfield				57°39′59″N 3°06′22″W	Category B	14858	Upload another image
Garmouth, Spey Street, Church Hall				57°40′00″N 3°06′20″W	Category C(S)	14860	Upload another image
Garmouth, The Wyndies, The Park				57°39′52″N 3°06′36″W	Category C(S)	14861	Upload another image
Longhill Mill, Miller's House				57°38′49″N 3°13′25″W	Category C(S)	14872	Upload Photo
Urquhart Village, The Mains				57°38′55″N 3°11′46″W	Category C(S)	14878	Upload Photo
Garmouth High Street, The Moorings And Rear Gighouse				57°39′54″N 3°06′33″W	Category B	14832	Upload another image
Innes House, Wellhead				57°40′05″N 3°11′57″W	Category C(S)	14839	Upload Photo
Innes House, North Lodge				57°40′26″N 3°12′37″W	Category B	14865	Upload Photo
Leuchars House Gatepiers				57°39′51″N 3°14′52″W	Category C(S)	14869	Upload Photo
Speymouth Railway Viaduct				57°39′46″N 3°05′53″W	Category B	14873	Upload another image See more images
Urquhart Manse, Dovecot				57°38′54″N 3°12′11″W	Category B	14875	Upload Photo
Innes House, Cross (At Lochhill)				57°40′08″N 3°11′36″W	Category B	14841	Upload Photo
Kingston Lein Road, Spey Villa				57°40′28″N 3°06′43″W	Category C(S)	14847	Upload Photo
Threapland Wood, Aa Sentry Box (No 714)				57°38′03″N 3°11′25″W	Category B	49230	Upload Photo
Garmouth, The Brae, Brae House				57°39′57″N 3°06′28″W	Category C(S)	14852	Upload another image
Garmouth, Church Street, The Neuk Steading				57°39′54″N 3°06′32″W	Category C(S)	14854	Upload another image
Garmouth, Church Street, Helmsley				57°39′53″N 3°06′31″W	Category C(S)	14822	Upload another image
Garmouth, Church Street, Danaber (Former Free Church Manse)				57°39′50″N 3°06′29″W	Category B	14825	Upload another image
Garmouth, The Cross Shop.jpg				57°39′55″N 3°06′30″W	Category C(S)	14829	Upload another image
Kingston, Burnside Road, 'Burnside'				57°40′24″N 3°06′43″W	Category B	14844	Upload Photo
Innes House, Walled Garden, Sundial And Mark's Garden				57°40′07″N 3°12′09″W	Category B	14863	Upload Photo
Innes House, Coach House, Garages And Stables				57°40′07″N 3°12′42″W	Category C(S)	14864	Upload Photo
Leuchars House, Sundial				57°39′58″N 3°14′43″W	Category B	14870	Upload Photo
Parrandier, Former Urquhart Parish Church				57°39′13″N 3°11′59″W	Category B	14876	Upload Photo
Garmouth, Church Street Post Office Cottage				57°39′53″N 3°06′31″W	Category C(S)	14823	Upload another image
Garmouth, Church Street, The Gatehouse				57°39′52″N 3°06′30″W	Category C(S)	14826	Upload another image
Garmouth, High Street, Mary Cottage				57°39′55″N 3°06′32″W	Category C(S)	14836	Upload another image
Innes House, East Lodge, Gatepiers And Gates (At Lochhill)				57°40′07″N 3°11′43″W	Category B	14840	Upload Photo
Garmouth, The Brae, 'The Brae'				57°39′56″N 3°06′28″W	Category C(S)	14851	Upload Photo
Garmouth, South Road, Stewart House, Stable And Garden Walls				57°39′51″N 3°06′34″W	Category C(S)	14856	Upload Photo
Urquhart Manse				57°38′55″N 3°12′09″W	Category B	14874	Upload Photo
Urquhart Village, Oaklands				57°38′54″N 3°11′46″W	Category C(S)	14879	Upload Photo
Garmouth, High Street, Craigisla				57°39′54″N 3°06′34″W	Category C(S)	14833	Upload Photo
Garmouth, High Street, The Shop (Dwelling House Only)				57°39′55″N 3°06′38″W	Category B	14834	Upload Photo
Garmouth, Schoolbrae, Water Tower				57°40′02″N 3°06′36″W	Category B	14838	Upload Photo
Innes House, West Entrance Gatepiers, Screen Walls And Gates				57°39′47″N 3°13′15″W	Category C(S)	14842	Upload Photo
Kingston, Kingston Road Dunfermline House And Garage				57°40′25″N 3°06′31″W	Category B	14846	Upload Photo
Garmouth, Spey Street, Stainson House				57°39′59″N 3°06′23″W	Category C(S)	14859	Upload Photo
Garmouth, High Street, The Poplars				57°39′55″N 3°06′32″W	Category C(S)	14837	Upload Photo
Kingston, Beach Road, "The Rocket House" (Former Rocket Station)				57°40′31″N 3°06′48″W	Category C(S)	14843	Upload Photo
Kingston, Cadgers Road, Edder Innes (Said Also To Be Known As Vacher Innes)				57°40′18″N 3°07′00″W	Category B	14845	Upload Photo
Kingston, Lein Road The Yews				57°40′27″N 3°06′43″W	Category C(S)	14850	Upload Photo
Kingston, Lein Road, Morven				57°40′26″N 3°06′41″W	Category C(S)	14866	Upload Photo
Kingston, Millbank				57°40′22″N 3°06′33″W	Category B	14867	Upload Photo
Longhill Mill				57°38′48″N 3°13′29″W	Category A	14871	Upload Photo
Garmouth Church Street, Falcon House				57°39′53″N 3°06′30″W	Category B	14827	Upload Photo
Garmouth, The Cross, Lemanacre, Gatepiers (Only)				57°39′54″N 3°06′29″W	Category B	14830	Upload Photo
Garmouth, Dellahapple House, Servants' House And Garden Walls				57°40′00″N 3°06′53″W	Category B	14831	Upload Photo
Kingston, Lein Road, Pebble Cottage (Formerly West End Cottage)				57°40′29″N 3°06′54″W	Category C(S)	14848	Upload Photo
Kingston, Lein Road, Sunnybank				57°40′27″N 3°06′45″W	Category C(S)	14849	Upload Photo
Garmouth, Church Street, The Neuk				57°39′54″N 3°06′31″W	Category B	14853	Upload Photo
Garmouth, South Road, Garmouth Hotel And Function Room				57°39′50″N 3°06′33″W	Category B	14855	Upload Photo
Innes House				57°40′09″N 3°12′35″W	Category A	14862	Upload Photo
Leuchars House				57°40′00″N 3°14′39″W	Category B	14868	Upload Photo
Urquhart Village, Burial Ground				57°38′53″N 3°11′37″W	Category C(S)	14877	Upload Photo
Garmouth Church Street, Garmouth Church (Church Of Scotland)				57°39′49″N 3°06′30″W	Category B	14824	Upload Photo
Garmouth, The Cross, The Cross				57°39′55″N 3°06′29″W	Category B	14828	Upload Photo
Garmouth, High Street, Laburnum And Wash House				57°39′55″N 3°06′38″W	Category B	14835	Upload Photo

== Key ==
The scheme for classifying buildings in Scotland is:

- Category A: "buildings of national or international importance, either architectural or historic; or fine, little-altered examples of some particular period, style or building type."
- Category B: "buildings of regional or more than local importance; or major examples of some particular period, style or building type, which may have been altered."
- Category C: "buildings of local importance; lesser examples of any period, style, or building type, as originally constructed or moderately altered; and simple traditional buildings which group well with other listed buildings."

In March 2016 there were 47,288 listed buildings in Scotland. Of these, 8% were Category A, and 50% were Category B, with the remaining 42% being Category C.

== See also ==
- List of listed buildings in Moray
