= List of listed buildings in Rafford, Moray =

This is a list of listed buildings in the parish of Rafford in Moray, Scotland.

== List ==
Name	Location	Date Listed	Grid Ref. (Note: Sometimes known as OSGB36, the grid reference (where provided) is based on the British national grid reference system used by the Ordnance Survey. • "Guide to National Grid". Ordnance Survey. • "Get-a-map". Ordnance Survey.)	Geo-coordinates	Notes	LB Number (Note: Historic Environment Scotland assign a unique alphanumeric identifier to each designated site in Scotland, for listed buildings this always begins with "LB", for example "LB12345".)	Image
Altyre, Blairs Home Farm With Tower Cottages, Pond Cottage And Clubhouse				57°34′32″N 3°37′37″W	Category A	17429	Upload another image See more images
Altyre, Blairs Cottage				57°34′35″N 3°37′29″W	Category C(S)	17430	Upload another image
Altyre, Wardend Cottages				57°34′29″N 3°36′12″W	Category C(S)	15579	Upload Photo
Altyre, Blairs Home Farm, Grieve's Cottage (The Bungalow)				57°34′37″N 3°37′38″W	Category B	15596	Upload Photo
Altyre, East Lodge (Formerly Wardend Lodge)				57°34′52″N 3°36′21″W	Category B	15597	Upload another image
Altyre, 1-8 (Inclusive Nos), Foresters' Cottages (Cothall Cottages)				57°34′24″N 3°38′19″W	Category A	15599	Upload another image
Altyre, Old Church				57°34′41″N 3°36′51″W	Category A	15604	Upload another image See more images
Altyre, West Lodge And Gates With Gatepiers				57°34′14″N 3°38′19″W	Category B	15580	Upload another image
Altyre, Episcopal Church				57°34′30″N 3°37′50″W	Category C(S)	15598	Upload another image See more images
Altyre, By Stables, Generator House				57°34′18″N 3°36′42″W	Category B	15608	Upload Photo
Burgie, Walled Garden And Portico				57°36′52″N 3°31′04″W	Category B	17431	Upload another image
Altyre House (Formerly Blairs House)				57°34′28″N 3°37′39″W	Category B	15577	Upload another image See more images
Burgie Tower				57°36′53″N 3°31′07″W	Category A	15586	Upload Photo
Altyre, Stables				57°34′18″N 3°36′43″W	Category A	15607	Upload another image See more images
Burgie House				57°36′58″N 3°31′28″W	Category B	15584	Upload another image
Altyre, Kennels And Kennels Cottage (Keeper's House)				57°33′58″N 3°37′08″W	Category C(S)	15602	Upload Photo
Altyre, Office Cottages (Former School)				57°34′39″N 3°37′18″W	Category B	15603	Upload another image
Altyre, Walled Garden (Old Walled Garden)				57°34′16″N 3°36′57″W	Category C(S)	15578	Upload another image
Blervie House And Gatepiers				57°34′42″N 3°34′11″W		15581	Upload Photo
Blervie Tower				57°35′42″N 3°33′22″W	Category A	15583	Upload Photo
Altyre, 1 Gardeners' Cottages				57°34′26″N 3°36′55″W	Category B	15600	Upload another image
Altyre, Old Stable Tower				57°34′08″N 3°36′55″W	Category C(S)	15605	Upload another image
Burgie Lodge				57°37′14″N 3°31′39″W	Category B	15587	Upload Photo
Rafford Burial Ground				57°35′09″N 3°34′26″W	Category B	15590	Upload another image
Altyre, Scurrypool Bridge Over The Altyre Burn And Disused Railway				57°33′33″N 3°36′07″W	Category B	15606	Upload another image See more images
Burgie House, Dovecot				57°36′52″N 3°31′10″W	Category B	15585	Upload Photo
Marcassie Farmhouse				57°35′23″N 3°34′47″W	Category B	15588	Upload Photo
Rongai House (Former Rafford Church Of Scotland Manse) And Steading				57°35′11″N 3°34′17″W	Category B	15591	Upload Photo
Blervie Mains House				57°35′38″N 3°34′13″W	Category A	15582	Upload Photo
Rafford Parish Church (Church Of Scotland)				57°35′15″N 3°34′25″W	Category B	15589	Upload another image See more images
Altyre, 2 Gardeners' Cottages				57°34′26″N 3°36′56″W	Category B	15601	Upload Photo

== Key ==
The scheme for classifying buildings in Scotland is:

- Category A: "buildings of national or international importance, either architectural or historic; or fine, little-altered examples of some particular period, style or building type."
- Category B: "buildings of regional or more than local importance; or major examples of some particular period, style or building type, which may have been altered."
- Category C: "buildings of local importance; lesser examples of any period, style, or building type, as originally constructed or moderately altered; and simple traditional buildings which group well with other listed buildings."

In March 2016 there were 47,288 listed buildings in Scotland. Of these, 8% were Category A, and 50% were Category B, with the remaining 42% being Category C.

== See also ==
- List of listed buildings in Moray
