= List of listed buildings in Boharm, Moray =

This is a list of listed buildings in the parish of Boharm in Moray, Scotland.

== List ==
Name	Location	Date Listed	Grid Ref. (Note: Sometimes known as OSGB36, the grid reference (where provided) is based on the British national grid reference system used by the Ordnance Survey. • "Guide to National Grid". Ordnance Survey. • "Get-a-map". Ordnance Survey.)	Geo-coordinates	Notes	LB Number (Note: Historic Environment Scotland assign a unique alphanumeric identifier to each designated site in Scotland, for listed buildings this always begins with "LB", for example "LB12345".)	Image
Arndilly House				57°30′31″N 3°11′09″W	Category A	2314	Upload another image
Arndilly Home Farm				57°31′00″N 3°11′51″W	Category C(S)	2315	Upload another image
Auchlunkart House, West Lodge				57°31′32″N 3°06′29″W	Category C(S)	2323	Upload Photo
Craigellachie, Bridge Of Fiddich Over River Fiddich				57°29′28″N 3°10′50″W	Category B	2318	Upload another image See more images
Mulben Mill				57°32′47″N 3°05′06″W	Category B	2319	Upload Photo
Arndilly, Macdowall Bridge Over Macdowall Burn				57°29′48″N 3°10′33″W	Category B	2316	Upload another image
Mulben Mill, Miller's Cottage				57°32′47″N 3°05′04″W	Category C(S)	2320	Upload Photo
Boharm Burial Ground And Ruin Of Former Church Of Scotland				57°30′11″N 3°08′03″W	Category B	2325	Upload another image
Boharm Old Parish Church Of Scotland				57°32′08″N 3°06′08″W	Category C(S)	2326	Upload another image
Boharm House (Former Church Of Scotland Manse), Gate-Piers, Steading And Garden Walls				57°32′01″N 3°05′55″W	Category B	2317	Upload Photo
Mulben, Former Railway Station, Former Station Master's House And Station Offices				57°32′35″N 3°04′38″W	Category B	2321	Upload another image
Boat Of Brig Tollhouse				57°33′01″N 3°08′24″W	Category A	2324	Upload another image
Craigellachie, Fiddichside Inn				57°29′27″N 3°10′49″W	Category C(S)	51121	Upload another image See more images
Auchlunkart House				57°31′52″N 3°06′17″W	Category B	2322	Upload Photo

== Key ==
The scheme for classifying buildings in Scotland is:

- Category A: "buildings of national or international importance, either architectural or historic; or fine, little-altered examples of some particular period, style or building type."
- Category B: "buildings of regional or more than local importance; or major examples of some particular period, style or building type, which may have been altered."
- Category C: "buildings of local importance; lesser examples of any period, style, or building type, as originally constructed or moderately altered; and simple traditional buildings which group well with other listed buildings."

In March 2016 there were 47,288 listed buildings in Scotland. Of these, 8% were Category A, and 50% were Category B, with the remaining 42% being Category C.

== See also ==
- List of listed buildings in Moray
