= List of listed buildings in Bellie, Moray =

This is a list of listed buildings in the parish of Bellie in Moray, Scotland.

== List ==
Name	Location	Date Listed	Grid Ref. (Note: Sometimes known as OSGB36, the grid reference (where provided) is based on the British national grid reference system used by the Ordnance Survey. • "Guide to National Grid". Ordnance Survey. • "Get-a-map". Ordnance Survey.)	Geo-coordinates	Notes	LB Number (Note: Historic Environment Scotland assign a unique alphanumeric identifier to each designated site in Scotland, for listed buildings this always begins with "LB", for example "LB12345".)	Image
Gordon Castle Farm, Farm Cottages				57°37′05″N 3°05′01″W	Category B	1624	Upload another image
Gordon Castle Gardens, Large And Small Walled Gardens				57°37′02″N 3°05′34″W	Category B	1626	Upload another image See more images
Chapelford, St Ninian's Burial Ground, Chapel And Dawson Mausoleum				57°37′33″N 3°01′15″W	Category B	1544	Upload another image See more images
Fochabers, 79 High Street, Bank Of Scotland				57°36′52″N 3°05′56″W	Category B	1546	Upload Photo
Fochabers, 81, High Street				57°36′53″N 3°05′56″W	Category C(S)	1547	Upload Photo
Fochabers, 13, 15 East Street				57°36′45″N 3°05′37″W	Category B	1555	Upload Photo
Fochabers, 4, 6, George Street				57°36′50″N 3°05′55″W	Category C(S)	1557	Upload Photo
Fochabers, 29, 31 High Street				57°36′48″N 3°05′40″W	Category C(S)	1564	Upload Photo
Fochabers, 41, 43 High Street				57°36′48″N 3°05′43″W	Category C(S)	1565	Upload Photo
Fochabers, 2, 4, 6 Maxwell Street				57°36′49″N 3°05′35″W	Category C(S)	1577	Upload Photo
Fochabers, South Street, Roman Catholic Church And Presbytery				57°36′46″N 3°05′43″W	Category B	1581	Upload Photo
Fochabers, 8, 10 The Square				57°36′52″N 3°05′48″W	Category B	1586	Upload Photo
Fochabers, West Street Garden Wall Fronting Ben Aliskay, But Not Including House				57°36′56″N 3°05′56″W	Category B	1593	Upload Photo
Gordon Castle, Mansion House, Gatepiers And Conservatory/Orangery				57°37′17″N 3°05′19″W	Category A	1595	Upload Photo
Fochabers, 15 And 15A The Square And Gardens Walls Facing The Square, George Street And Spey Street				57°36′51″N 3°05′54″W	Category B	1619	Upload Photo
22 Bogmuir				57°39′06″N 3°04′44″W	Category C(S)	1541	Upload Photo
Fochabers, By Cricket Field, Fountain				57°36′57″N 3°06′08″W	Category C(S)	1551	Upload another image
Fochabers, 3, 5 Duke Street And Garden Walls				57°36′54″N 3°05′49″W	Category B	1553	Upload Photo
Fochabers, 69 High Street				57°36′50″N 3°05′49″W	Category B	1566	Upload Photo
Fochabers, 38, 40 High Street				57°36′49″N 3°05′41″W	Category C(S)	1567	Upload Photo
Fochabers, 54, 54A High Street				57°36′50″N 3°05′45″W	Category C(S)	1571	Upload Photo
Fochabers, 78 High Street Gordon Arms Hotel Including West Street And Gordon Street Elevations				57°36′54″N 3°05′57″W	Category B	1575	Upload Photo
Fochabers, 42 South Street, South View				57°36′47″N 3°05′50″W	Category B	1582	Upload Photo
Fochabers, 2 Castle Street, East Lodge And Garden Wall				57°36′50″N 3°05′33″W	Category A	1584	Upload Photo
Gordon Castle, Home Farm Steading (Former Stables/Carriage House)				57°37′17″N 3°05′28″W	Category B	1620	Upload Photo
Gordon Castle Gardens, Lakeside House				57°37′05″N 3°05′41″W	Category A	1628	Upload another image
Gordon Castle, Quarry Gardens Lodge				57°37′39″N 3°04′51″W	Category B	1630	Upload another image
Gordon Castle, Whitegate Lodge And Outbuildings				57°36′49″N 3°04′33″W	Category B	1631	Upload another image
Fochabers, 10 Gordon Street And Garden Walls				57°36′54″N 3°05′54″W	Category B	1559	Upload Photo
Fochabers, High Street, Milne's High School And Enclosing Walls With Gatepiers				57°36′41″N 3°05′30″W	Category A	1560	Upload another image See more images
Fochabers, The Old Manse				57°36′40″N 3°05′53″W	Category B	1580	Upload Photo
Fochabers, 14 The Square And 1 Duke Street				57°36′53″N 3°05′50″W	Category C(S)	1588	Upload Photo
Fochabers, War Memorial				57°36′58″N 3°06′07″W	Category B	1592	Upload another image See more images
Tugnet Ice House				57°40′24″N 3°05′33″W	Category A	1605	Upload another image See more images
Tugnet, Tugnet Cottage And Steading				57°40′24″N 3°05′31″W	Category B	1606	Upload Photo
Tynet, Roman Catholic Chapel Of St Ninian				57°38′13″N 3°02′31″W	Category A	1609	Upload another image See more images
Fochabers, 1, 3 The Square				57°36′50″N 3°05′49″W	Category B	1613	Upload Photo
Fochabers, 5 The Square				57°36′50″N 3°05′50″W	Category C(S)	1614	Upload Photo
Fochabers, The Square, Bellie Kirk (Church Of Scotland)				57°36′50″N 3°05′52″W	Category A	1616	Upload another image See more images
Speymouth Forest, Whiteash Cairn				57°36′11″N 3°03′02″W	Category C(S)	1634	Upload another image See more images
19 Bogmuir				57°39′06″N 3°04′46″W	Category B	1542	Upload Photo
Byres Farmhouse				57°38′45″N 3°04′51″W	Category B	1543	Upload Photo
Fochabers, Castle Street, Park Wall Fronting Gordon Castle Park Between Angle With West Street And Gordon Chapel				57°36′55″N 3°06′04″W	Category B	1550	Upload Photo
Fochabers, 9, 11 East Street				57°36′46″N 3°05′37″W	Category C(S)	1554	Upload Photo
Fochabers, 2, 4, 6 East Street				57°36′50″N 3°05′34″W	Category C(S)	1556	Upload Photo
Fochabers, 8 George Street				57°36′50″N 3°05′56″W	Category B	1558	Upload Photo
Fochabers, 42 High Street, Grant Arms Hotel				57°36′49″N 3°05′42″W	Category C(S)	1568	Upload Photo
Fochabers, 46 High Street				57°36′49″N 3°05′44″W	Category C(S)	1569	Upload Photo
Fochabers, 50, 50A, 52 High Street, Clydesdale Bank				57°36′50″N 3°05′45″W	Category B	1570	Upload Photo
Fochabers, 56 High Street				57°36′50″N 3°05′46″W	Category C(S)	1572	Upload Photo
32 Maxwell Street				57°36′52″N 3°05′45″W	Category C(S)	1578	Upload Photo
Fochabers, 46 South Street				57°36′48″N 3°05′52″W	Category B	1583	Upload Photo
Fochabers, 12 The Square And Return Wing To Duke Street				57°36′52″N 3°05′49″W	Category B	1587	Upload Photo
Fochabers, 87 And 89 High Street				57°36′53″N 3°05′59″W	Category C(S)	1599	Upload Photo
Fochabers, 11 The Square, The Manse, And Garden Walls Flanking George Street				57°36′50″N 3°05′54″W	Category B	1617	Upload Photo
Gordon Castle, Bellie Lodge				57°38′02″N 3°05′11″W	Category C(S)	1622	Upload another image
Gordon Castle Gardens, Garden House				57°37′05″N 3°05′34″W	Category B	1627	Upload another image
Speymouth Forest, Bridge Over The Burn Of Redpath				57°35′20″N 3°02′09″W	Category C(S)	1633	Upload Photo
Fochabers, 4 Duke Street, St Margarets, Rear Walls And Stable				57°36′54″N 3°05′48″W	Category B	1552	Upload Photo
Fochabers, 17 High Street And 7 East Street				57°36′46″N 3°05′36″W	Category C(S)	1561	Upload Photo
Fochabers, 23 High Street				57°36′47″N 3°05′39″W	Category C(S)	1562	Upload Photo
Fochabers, 58 High Street				57°36′50″N 3°05′47″W	Category B	1573	Upload Photo
Fochabers, 2 The Square				57°36′51″N 3°05′48″W	Category B	1585	Upload Photo
Gordon Castle, Fountain				57°37′15″N 3°05′15″W	Category B	1597	Upload Photo
Fochabers, 24 High Street				57°36′48″N 3°05′38″W	Category B	1602	Upload Photo
Tugnet, Salmon Fishing Station, Courtyard Square With Dwellings And Adjoining Fish House				57°40′24″N 3°05′33″W	Category A	1604	Upload Photo
Tugnet, Tugnet House				57°40′24″N 3°05′30″W	Category C(S)	1607	Upload Photo
Fochabers, 7 The Square				57°36′50″N 3°05′51″W	Category B	1615	Upload Photo
Speymouth Forest, Meikle Dramlach Bridge Over Meikle Dramlach Burn				57°35′54″N 3°03′02″W	Category B	4836	Upload Photo
The Square, The Fountain				57°36′51″N 3°05′52″W	Category B	1618	Upload another image See more images
Gordon Castle, West Lodge, Main Entrance With 2 Dwellings				57°37′01″N 3°06′05″W	Category A	1621	Upload another image
Bellie Burial Ground, The Gordon Tomb				57°38′03″N 3°05′05″W	Category A	1539	Upload another image See more images
Fochabers, 77 High Street				57°36′52″N 3°05′55″W	Category B	1545	Upload Photo
Fochabers, Castle Street, Gordon Chapel (Episcopal Church) And Gordon Chapel House (Parsonage)				57°36′55″N 3°05′47″W	Category A	1549	Upload another image
Fochabers, 20 The Square With Garden Walls And Outbuildings				57°36′53″N 3°05′52″W	Category C(S)	1590	Upload Photo
Fochabers, 22 The Square, Hadlow House				57°36′53″N 3°05′53″W	Category C(S)	1591	Upload Photo
Fochabers, 26 Westmorland Street				57°36′46″N 3°05′46″W	Category B	1594	Upload Photo
Fochabers, 18 High Street, The White Lodge (Former Free Church Manse)				57°36′47″N 3°05′34″W	Category B	1600	Upload Photo
Fochabers, 36 High Street				57°36′48″N 3°05′41″W	Category C(S)	1603	Upload Photo
Gordon Castle, Kennels				57°37′08″N 3°04′56″W	Category B	1625	Upload another image
Gordon Castle, Old Fochabers Market Cross, Also Known As The Jougs And The Whipping Post				57°37′06″N 3°05′36″W	Category C(S)	1629	Upload another image
Fochabers, 38 Maxwell Street				57°36′53″N 3°05′47″W	Category C(S)	1579	Upload Photo
Fochabers, 18 The Square				57°36′53″N 3°05′51″W	Category B	1589	Upload Photo
Gordon Castle Tower				57°37′17″N 3°05′24″W	Category A	1596	Upload another image
Fochabers, High Street, Pringle Church (Former Free Church)				57°36′48″N 3°05′37″W	Category C(S)	1601	Upload Photo
Tugnet, Willow Cottage				57°40′22″N 3°05′14″W	Category B	1608	Upload Photo
Fochabers, 54 South Street				57°36′49″N 3°05′56″W	Category B	1611	Upload Photo
Fochabers, 56 South Street				57°36′49″N 3°05′57″W	Category B	1612	Upload Photo
Gordon Castle Farm, Steading With Dwellings				57°37′04″N 3°04′59″W	Category A	1623	Upload another image
Roman Camp Cottage, (Formerly Roman Camp Gate Lodge)				57°38′32″N 3°04′25″W	Category B	1632	Upload Photo
Swiss Cottage				57°37′17″N 3°03′25″W	Category A	1635	Upload another image
Bellie Burial Ground				57°38′03″N 3°05′06″W	Category B	1538	Upload another image See more images
Fochabers, 83 High Street, Monair				57°36′53″N 3°05′57″W	Category C(S)	1548	Upload Photo
Fochabers, 25 High Street				57°36′47″N 3°05′40″W	Category C(S)	1563	Upload Photo
Focahbers, 70 High Street, Fulton House				57°36′53″N 3°05′55″W	Category C(S)	1574	Upload Photo
Fochabers, 15 Maxwell Street				57°36′49″N 3°05′39″W	Category B	1576	Upload Photo
Fochabers, 85 High Street				57°36′53″N 3°05′58″W	Category C(S)	1598	Upload Photo
Fochabers, 48 South Street, Broomailly				57°36′48″N 3°05′52″W	Category B	1610	Upload Photo

== Key ==
The scheme for classifying buildings in Scotland is:

- Category A: "buildings of national or international importance, either architectural or historic; or fine, little-altered examples of some particular period, style or building type."
- Category B: "buildings of regional or more than local importance; or major examples of some particular period, style or building type, which may have been altered."
- Category C: "buildings of local importance; lesser examples of any period, style, or building type, as originally constructed or moderately altered; and simple traditional buildings which group well with other listed buildings."

In March 2016 there were 47,288 listed buildings in Scotland. Of these, 8% were Category A, and 50% were Category B, with the remaining 42% being Category C.

== See also ==
- List of listed buildings in Moray
