= List of listed buildings in Rothiemay, Moray =

This is a list of listed buildings in the parish of Rothiemay in Moray, Scotland.

== List ==
Name	Location	Date listed	Geo-coordinates	Notes	Category	LB number	Image
Mains Of Mayen			57°31′05″N 2°42′42″W		A	15610	Upload Photo
Milltown Of Rothiemay, Forbes Arms			57°31′16″N 2°45′23″W		B	15614	Upload another image
Milltown Of Rothiemay, Bridge Over River Deveron			57°31′14″N 2°45′24″W		B	15613	Upload another image
Mayen House, Stables/Steading			57°31′05″N 2°42′07″W		B	15612	Upload Photo
Milltown Of Rothiemay, Parish Church (Church Of Scotland) And Burial Ground			57°31′23″N 2°45′27″W		B	15616	Upload another image
Bridge Of Marnoch (Over River Deveron)			57°32′02″N 2°39′43″W		B	15609	Upload Photo
Milltown Of Rothiemay, The Mill House			57°31′17″N 2°45′21″W		C(S)	15615	Upload Photo
Rothiemay House, Kiln Barn			57°31′26″N 2°45′03″W		A	15618	Upload Photo
Rothiemay House, Queen Mary's Bridge Over The Kirktown Burn			57°31′17″N 2°44′40″W		B	15619	Upload Photo
Rothiemay House, Dovecot			57°31′21″N 2°45′09″W		C(S)	15617	Upload another image
Mayen House And Detached Wing			57°31′08″N 2°42′11″W		B	15611	Upload Photo

== Key ==
The scheme for classifying buildings in Scotland is:

- Category A: "buildings of national or international importance, either architectural or historic; or fine, little-altered examples of some particular period, style or building type."
- Category B: "buildings of regional or more than local importance; or major examples of some particular period, style or building type, which may have been altered."
- Category C: "buildings of local importance; lesser examples of any period, style, or building type, as originally constructed or moderately altered; and simple traditional buildings which group well with other listed buildings."

In March 2016 there were 47,288 listed buildings in Scotland. Of these, 8% were Category A, and 50% were Category B, with the remaining 42% being Category C.

== See also ==
- List of listed buildings in Moray
