= List of listed buildings in Cabrach, Moray =

This is a list of listed buildings in the parish of Cabrach in Moray, Scotland.

== List ==
Name	Location	Date Listed	Grid Ref. (Note: Sometimes known as OSGB36, the grid reference (where provided) is based on the British national grid reference system used by the Ordnance Survey. • "Guide to National Grid". Ordnance Survey. • "Get-a-map". Ordnance Survey.)	Geo-coordinates	Notes	LB Number (Note: Historic Environment Scotland assign a unique alphanumeric identifier to each designated site in Scotland, for listed buildings this always begins with "LB", for example "LB12345".)	Image
Bridge Over Allt Deveron By Cabrach Church				57°19′38″N 3°01′19″W	Category C(S)	2253	Upload another image
Cabrach Parish Church And Burial Ground (Church Of Scotland)				57°19′39″N 3°01′15″W	Category B	2255	Upload another image See more images
Blackwater Bridge Over Blackwater Burn (A941)				57°21′49″N 3°02′09″W	Category C(S)	2252	Upload another image See more images
Deveron House (Former Church Of Scotland Manse), Steading And Garden Walls				57°19′43″N 3°01′17″W	Category C(S)	2256	Upload another image See more images
Blackwater Lodge				57°20′34″N 3°06′22″W	Category C(S)	2251	Upload another image See more images
Bridge Over Milltown Burn By Milltown				57°19′42″N 3°01′45″W	Category C(S)	2254	Upload another image

== Key ==
The scheme for classifying buildings in Scotland is:

- Category A: "buildings of national or international importance, either architectural or historic; or fine, little-altered examples of some particular period, style or building type."
- Category B: "buildings of regional or more than local importance; or major examples of some particular period, style or building type, which may have been altered."
- Category C: "buildings of local importance; lesser examples of any period, style, or building type, as originally constructed or moderately altered; and simple traditional buildings which group well with other listed buildings."

In March 2016 there were 47,288 listed buildings in Scotland. Of these, 8% were Category A, and 50% were Category B, with the remaining 42% being Category C.

== See also ==
- List of listed buildings in Moray
