= List of listed buildings in Lossiemouth, Moray =

This is a list of listed buildings in the parish of Lossiemouth in Moray, Scotland.

== List ==
Name	Location	Date Listed	Grid Ref. (Note: Sometimes known as OSGB36, the grid reference (where provided) is based on the British national grid reference system used by the Ordnance Survey. • "Guide to National Grid". Ordnance Survey. • "Get-a-map". Ordnance Survey.)	Geo-coordinates	Notes	LB Number (Note: Historic Environment Scotland assign a unique alphanumeric identifier to each designated site in Scotland, for listed buildings this always begins with "LB", for example "LB12345".)	Image
Coulardbank Road, The Wardens And The Leas (Former General Assembly Schools) And Garden Walls				57°42′59″N 3°17′28″W	Category B	37604	Upload Photo
Seatown, K6 Telephone Kiosk				57°43′00″N 3°16′52″W	Category B	37615	Upload Photo
15 And 16 Clifton Road				57°43′10″N 3°16′57″W	Category B	37593	Upload Photo
22, 24A Clifton Road				57°43′08″N 3°17′00″W	Category C(S)	37595	Upload Photo
79, 81 Clifton Road				57°43′01″N 3°17′18″W	Category C(S)	37600	Upload Photo
The Courlard (Inn) (Formerly Couldardbank House), Garden Wall And Gatepiers				57°42′46″N 3°18′08″W	Category B	37601	Upload Photo
Covesea Skerries Lighthouse, Keepers' Cottages And Steading				57°43′25″N 3°20′15″W	Category A	37605	Upload Photo
17 Moray Street, The Hillocks				57°42′51″N 3°17′18″W	Category B	37608	Upload Photo
5 Clifton Road				57°43′12″N 3°16′53″W	Category C(S)	37592	Upload Photo
Clifton Road, Rock House Hotel (Formerly Rock Cottage)				57°43′00″N 3°17′23″W	Category B	37598	Upload Photo
1 Gregory Place				57°42′59″N 3°17′03″W	Category B	37606	Upload Photo
Pitgaveny Street, Harbour Master's Offices, Lossiemouth Fisheries Museum And Associated Warehouses				57°43′23″N 3°16′48″W	Category A	37609	Upload another image
Prospect Terrace, Craigmount (Formerly Denmark Cottage)				57°43′13″N 3°17′00″W	Category B	37610	Upload Photo
Seatown Bridge Over Spynie Canal				57°43′02″N 3°16′57″W	Category B	37613	Upload Photo
20 Clifton Road				57°43′08″N 3°17′00″W	Category B	37594	Upload Photo
Gregory Place, Market Cross				57°43′00″N 3°17′04″W	Category B	37607	Upload Photo
St Gerardine's Road, St Gerardine's High Church Of Scotland, Column, Enclosing Walls And Gatepiers				57°43′06″N 3°17′23″W	Category B	37611	Upload another image
1, 2 Seatown Road And Garden Walls				57°43′03″N 3°17′01″W	Category C(S)	37612	Upload Photo
Coulardbank Road, Mansefield And Garden Walls (Former Free Church Manse)				57°42′58″N 3°17′32″W	Category B	37602	Upload Photo
Coulardbank Road, Newtown Cottage				57°42′57″N 3°17′30″W	Category C(S)	37603	Upload Photo
24 Clifton Road				57°43′08″N 3°17′00″W	Category B	37596	Upload Photo
62 Clifton Road, The Deanery, Garden Walls And Gatepiers				57°43′03″N 3°17′16″W	Category C(S)	37597	Upload Photo
33 Clifton Road, Lossiemouth House				57°43′05″N 3°17′06″W	Category B	37599	Upload another image
Stotfield Road, Blucairn And Sundial				57°43′02″N 3°18′06″W	Category C(S)	37614	Upload Photo

== Key ==
The scheme for classifying buildings in Scotland is:

- Category A: "buildings of national or international importance, either architectural or historic; or fine, little-altered examples of some particular period, style or building type."
- Category B: "buildings of regional or more than local importance; or major examples of some particular period, style or building type, which may have been altered."
- Category C: "buildings of local importance; lesser examples of any period, style, or building type, as originally constructed or moderately altered; and simple traditional buildings which group well with other listed buildings."

In March 2016 there were 47,288 listed buildings in Scotland. Of these, 8% were Category A, and 50% were Category B, with the remaining 42% being Category C.

== See also ==
- List of listed buildings in Moray
