= List of listed buildings in Kinloss =

This is a list of listed buildings in the parish of Kinloss in Moray, Scotland.

== List ==
| Name | Location | Date Listed | Grid Ref. (Note: Sometimes known as OSGB36, the grid reference (where provided) is based on the British national grid reference system used by the Ordnance Survey. • "Guide to National Grid". Ordnance Survey. • "Get-a-map". Ordnance Survey.) | Geo-coordinates | Notes | LB Number (Note: Historic Environment Scotland assign a unique alphanumeric identifier to each designated site in Scotland, for listed buildings this always begins with "LB", for example "LB12345".) | Image |
|---|---|---|---|---|---|---|---|
| 119 Findhorn | | | | 57°39′32″N 3°36′41″W | Category C(S) | 8657 | Upload Photo |
| 204 Findhorn | | | | 57°39′24″N 3°36′25″W | Category B | 8660 | Upload Photo |
| Grange Hall | | | | 57°37′30″N 3°34′08″W | Category A | 8661 | Upload Photo |
| 14 Findhorn, Caberfeidh | | | | 57°39′37″N 3°36′48″W | Category B | 8672 | Upload Photo |
| Kinloss Home Farm Steading | | | | 57°38′00″N 3°34′06″W | Category B | 8679 | Upload Photo |
| Kinloss Abbey and Burial Ground | | | | 57°38′00″N 3°33′59″W | Category A | 8687 | Upload another image |
| 124 Findhorn | | | | 57°39′33″N 3°36′38″W | Category C(S) | 8658 | Upload Photo |
| 18, 19/20, 21 Findhorn | | | | 57°39′36″N 3°36′47″W | Category B | 8673 | Upload Photo |
| Kinloss, Former Sea Park Stables | | | | 57°38′04″N 3°34′19″W | Category B | 8683 | Upload Photo |
| Findhorn Ice House | | | | 57°39′39″N 3°36′52″W | Category B | 8684 | Upload Photo |
| Findhorn, Church of Scotland (Former Free Church of Scotland) and Church Hall | | | | 57°39′26″N 3°36′29″W | Category B | 8666 | Upload Photo |
| 11 Findhorn, The Courtyard | | | | 57°39′37″N 3°36′49″W | Category B | 8670 | Upload Photo |
| 12 Findhorn, Quay Cottage | | | | 57°39′35″N 3°36′48″W | Category B | 8671 | Upload Photo |
| 45 Findhorn, Kilravock | | | | 57°39′34″N 3°36′44″W | Category B | 8675 | Upload Photo |
| 94 Findhorn, Kimberley Inn | | | | 57°39′33″N 3°36′41″W | Category B | 8656 | Upload Photo |
| Grange Hall, North Lodge | | | | 57°37′46″N 3°34′20″W | Category B | 8663 | Upload Photo |
| 4 Findhorn, Former Salmon Station | | | | 57°39′37″N 3°36′51″W | Category B | 8668 | Upload Photo |
| Findhorn House (Royal Findhorn Yacht Club) | | | | 57°39′36″N 3°36′49″W | Category B | 8669 | Upload Photo |
| 44 Findhorn, Crown and Anchor Inn | | | | 57°39′35″N 3°36′45″W | Category C(S) | 8674 | Upload Photo |
| 50 Findhorn, Boisdale | | | | 57°39′36″N 3°36′42″W | Category C(S) | 8677 | Upload Photo |
| Kinloss, Kinloss Parish Church (Church of Scotland) and Enclosing Walls | | | | 57°38′09″N 3°34′18″W | Category B | 8680 | Upload Photo |
| Kinloss, Sea Park House and Walled Garden | | | | 57°38′05″N 3°34′26″W | Category B | 8682 | Upload Photo |
| Grange Hall, Stables/Steading | | | | 57°37′37″N 3°34′13″W | Category B | 8685 | Upload Photo |
| Grange Hall, Walled Garden | | | | 57°37′27″N 3°33′54″W | Category C(S) | 8686 | Upload Photo |
| Findhorn, Harbour Piers | | | | 57°39′33″N 3°36′46″W | Category B | 8667 | Upload Photo |
| Kinloss, Home Farm, Barn | | | | 57°38′00″N 3°34′06″W | Category A | 8678 | Upload Photo |
| Grange Hall, Dovecot | | | | 57°37′38″N 3°34′15″W | Category B | 8662 | Upload Photo |
| East Grange Mill | | | | 57°38′09″N 3°31′02″W | Category A | 8665 | Upload Photo |
| 161 Findhorn | | | | 57°39′31″N 3°36′35″W | Category C(S) | 8659 | Upload Photo |
| Grange Hall, South Lodge | | | | 57°37′11″N 3°34′04″W | Category B | 8664 | Upload Photo |
| 46, 47, 48 Findhorn, Station House | | | | 57°39′34″N 3°36′43″W | Category B | 8676 | Upload Photo |
| Kinloss, Old Manse (Former Church of Scotland Manse) | | | | 57°38′15″N 3°34′18″W | Category B | 8681 | Upload Photo |

== Key ==
The scheme for classifying buildings in Scotland is:

- Category A: "buildings of national or international importance, either architectural or historic; or fine, little-altered examples of some particular period, style or building type."
- Category B: "buildings of regional or more than local importance; or major examples of some particular period, style or building type, which may have been altered."
- Category C: "buildings of local importance; lesser examples of any period, style, or building type, as originally constructed or moderately altered; and simple traditional buildings which group well with other listed buildings."

In March 2016 there were 47,288 listed buildings in Scotland. Of these, 8% were Category A, and 50% were Category B, with the remaining 42% being Category C.

== See also ==
- List of listed buildings in Moray
