= List of listed buildings in Keith, Moray =

This is a list of listed buildings in the parish of Keith in Moray, Scotland.

== List ==
| Name | Location | Date listed | Grid ref. (Note: Sometimes known as OSGB36, the grid reference (where provided) is based on the British national grid reference system used by the Ordnance Survey. • "Guide to National Grid". Ordnance Survey. • "Get-a-map". Ordnance Survey.) | Geo-coordinates | Notes | LB number (Note: Historic Environment Scotland assign a unique alphanumeric identifier to each designated site in Scotland, for listed buildings this always begins with "LB", for example "LB12345".) | Image |
|---|---|---|---|---|---|---|---|
| 124 Land Street, Moorfield | | | | 57°32′28″N 2°57′08″W | Category C(S) | 35639 | Upload Photo |
| 104, 106, 108 Mid Street | | | | 57°32′24″N 2°57′02″W | Category B | 35653 | Upload Photo |
| Old Keith, Burial Ground And Site Of Former Parish Church | | | | 57°32′34″N 2°57′30″W | Category B | 35660 | Upload Photo |
| 13 Regent Street, St Ronans | | | | 57°32′39″N 2°57′29″W | Category B | 35665 | Upload another image |
| 15 Regent Street, Appin House And Garden Wall Abutting Regent Street And Wellington Terrace | | | | 57°32′39″N 2°57′31″W | Category B | 35666 | Upload another image |
| Seafield Avenue, Holy Trinity Episcopal Church And Enclosing Walls | | | | 57°32′42″N 2°57′10″W | Category B | 35678 | Upload another image |
| 109, 111 Land Street | | | | 57°32′29″N 2°57′06″W | Category C(S) | 35632 | Upload Photo |
| 54, 56 Land Street And Garden Walls At South | | | | 57°32′18″N 2°57′10″W | Category B | 35636 | Upload Photo |
| 134, 136 Land Street, (Former North Of Scotland Bank) | | | | 57°32′30″N 2°57′08″W | Category B | 35640 | Upload Photo |
| 115, 117, Mid Street | | | | 57°32′25″N 2°56′59″W | Category B | 35647 | Upload Photo |
| 5 Regent Street | | | | 57°32′38″N 2°57′28″W | Category C(S) | 35664 | Upload another image |
| 33, 35 Regent Street | | | | 57°32′40″N 2°57′36″W | Category C(S) | 35668 | Upload another image |
| 2 Reidhaven Square And Garden Walls | | | | 57°32′17″N 2°56′57″W | Category B | 35674 | Upload Photo |
| 46, 48 Duff Street, (Entrance To No 48 Facing Mar Place) And Garden Wall To Mar Place | | | | 57°32′37″N 2°57′52″W | Category C(S) | 35630 | Upload Photo |
| Land Street, War Memorial | | | | 57°32′36″N 2°57′06″W | Category B | 35634 | Upload another image |
| Crooks Mill | | | | 57°33′01″N 2°59′17″W | Category B | 8701 | Upload Photo |
| 49, 51 Mid Street | | | | 57°32′17″N 2°57′01″W | Category B | 35645 | Upload Photo |
| 98 Mid Street | | | | 57°32′23″N 2°57′02″W | Category C(S) | 35652 | Upload Photo |
| 138, 140 Mid Street, The Institute | | | | 57°32′28″N 2°57′01″W | Category B | 35655 | Upload another image |
| 176, 178, 180 Mid Street | | | | 57°32′32″N 2°57′00″W | Category B | 35656 | Upload Photo |
| 37, 39 Regent Street | | | | 57°32′41″N 2°57′37″W | Category C(S) | 35669 | Upload Photo |
| 14 Chapel Street | | | | 57°32′19″N 2°57′13″W | Category C(S) | 35628 | Upload another image |
| 143, 145 Land Street And 14 Union Street | | | | 57°32′33″N 2°57′06″W | Category C(S) | 35633 | Upload Photo |
| 166 Land Street And 16 Union Street | | | | 57°32′33″N 2°57′07″W | Category B | 35643 | Upload Photo |
| Old Keith, Bridge Over River Isla | | | | 57°32′37″N 2°57′28″W | Category A | 35661 | Upload another image |
| 1, 3 Regent Street | | | | 57°32′38″N 2°57′27″W | Category C(S) | 35663 | Upload another image |
| 16, 18 Regent Street | | | | 57°32′39″N 2°57′35″W | Category C(S) | 35671 | Upload another image |
| 7, 9 Chapel Street, Den Mar And Crimond | | | | 57°32′19″N 2°57′07″W | Category C(S) | 35624 | Upload another image |
| 12 Chapel Street | | | | 57°32′19″N 2°57′12″W | Category C(S) | 35627 | Upload another image |
| Church Road, St Rufus Church (Church Of Scotland), Enclosing Walls And Gatepiers | | | | 57°32′37″N 2°57′15″W | Category A | 35629 | Upload another image |
| 86 Land Street, Cuthill Lea | | | | 57°32′23″N 2°57′09″W | Category B | 35637 | Upload Photo |
| Auchindachy Bridge Over River Isla | | | | 57°30′49″N 2°59′28″W | Category B | 8700 | Upload Photo |
| 88, 90, 92 Land Street, Chapel House | | | | 57°32′24″N 2°57′09″W | Category C(S) | 35638 | Upload Photo |
| 168, 170 Land Street | | | | 57°32′34″N 2°57′07″W | Category C(S) | 35644 | Upload Photo |
| 161, 163 Mid Street, Clydesdale Bank | | | | 57°32′30″N 2°56′58″W | Category C(S) | 35648 | Upload Photo |
| 2 Nelson Terrace | | | | 57°32′38″N 2°57′38″W | Category B | 35659 | Upload Photo |
| 47, 49 Regent Street, 2 And 2A Station Road, Regent House | | | | 57°32′42″N 2°57′39″W | Category B | 35670 | Upload another image |
| 28, 30 Regent Street And Return Elevation To Regent Square, Fife Arms Hotel | | | | 57°32′40″N 2°57′38″W | Category B | 35672 | Upload another image |
| 36 Regent Street And 4, 5 Regent Square, Grampian Hotel (Formerly Gordon Arms Hotel) | | | | 57°32′41″N 2°57′43″W | Category C(S) | 35673 | Upload another image |
| 17 Reidhaven Square | | | | 57°32′19″N 2°57′05″W | Category B | 35676 | Upload Photo |
| 22, 23 Reidhaven Square, The Crown Inn And 53, 55 Mid Street | | | | 57°32′19″N 2°57′00″W | Category C(S) | 35677 | Upload another image |
| Seafield Avenue, Strathisla Distillery | | | | 57°32′48″N 2°57′18″W | Category A | 35679 | Upload another image |
| Chapel Street, Roman Catholic Church Of St Thomas And Presbytery | | | | 57°32′19″N 2°57′16″W | Category A | 35623 | Upload another image |
| 140 Land Street | | | | 57°32′30″N 2°57′08″W | Category C(S) | 35641 | Upload Photo |
| 162, 164 Land Street | | | | 57°32′33″N 2°57′07″W | Category C(S) | 35642 | Upload Photo |
| 56-66 (Even Nos) Mid Street And 20, 21 Reidhaven Square | | | | 57°32′19″N 2°57′02″W | Category B | 35650 | Upload another image |
| 43 Moss Street | | | | 57°32′17″N 2°56′55″W | Category B | 35657 | Upload Photo |
| 45 Moss Street | | | | 57°32′17″N 2°56′55″W | Category B | 35658 | Upload Photo |
| 29, 31 Regent Street | | | | 57°32′40″N 2°57′35″W | Category C(S) | 35667 | Upload another image |
| 8 Reidhaven Square And 50-54 (Even Nos) Mid Street | | | | 57°32′17″N 2°57′03″W | Category B | 35675 | Upload another image |
| 13, 15 Chapel Street | | | | 57°32′19″N 2°57′10″W | Category C(S) | 35626 | Upload another image |
| Crooksmill Bridge Over Forgie Burn | | | | 57°33′02″N 2°59′17″W | Category C(S) | 8702 | Upload Photo |
| 86 Mid Street, Seafield Arms Hotel | | | | 57°32′22″N 2°57′02″W | Category B | 35651 | Upload Photo |
| 130, 132 Mid Street, The Post Office | | | | 57°32′27″N 2°57′01″W | Category B | 35654 | Upload Photo |
| 2 Regent Square And Garden Walls | | | | 57°32′39″N 2°57′41″W | Category B | 35662 | Upload another image |
| Union Bridge Over River Isla | | | | 57°32′37″N 2°57′25″W | Category C(S) | 35682 | Upload another image |
| 42 Land Street, Former Steading At Rear And Garden Wall | | | | 57°32′16″N 2°57′10″W | Category C(S) | 35635 | Upload Photo |
| Newmill, Mill Of Newmill | | | | 57°33′22″N 2°56′23″W | Category C(S) | 8704 | Upload Photo |
| Newmill, War Memorial Clock Tower | | | | 57°33′33″N 2°56′44″W | Category C(S) | 8705 | Upload another image See more images |
| 105, 107 Mid Street | | | | 57°32′24″N 2°56′59″W | Category B | 35646 | Upload Photo |
| Mid Street, North Church Of Scotland | | | | 57°32′34″N 2°56′57″W | Category B | 35649 | Upload another image |
| Station Road, Linn Bridge Over River Isla | | | | 57°32′49″N 2°57′23″W | Category B | 35680 | Upload Photo |
| 11 Chapel Street, Cuthill House | | | | 57°32′19″N 2°57′08″W | Category B | 35625 | Upload another image |
| Edintore House | | | | 57°30′01″N 2°57′27″W | Category B | 8703 | Upload Photo |

== Key ==
The scheme for classifying buildings in Scotland is:

- Category A: "buildings of national or international importance, either architectural or historic; or fine, little-altered examples of some particular period, style or building type."
- Category B: "buildings of regional or more than local importance; or major examples of some particular period, style or building type, which may have been altered."
- Category C: "buildings of local importance; lesser examples of any period, style, or building type, as originally constructed or moderately altered; and simple traditional buildings which group well with other listed buildings."

In March 2016 there were 47,288 listed buildings in Scotland. Of these, 8% were Category A, and 50% were Category B, with the remaining 42% being Category C.

== See also ==
- List of listed buildings in Moray
