= List of listed buildings in Aberlour, Moray =

This is a list of listed buildings in the parish of Aberlour in Moray, Scotland.

== List ==
Name	Location	Date listed	Grid ref. (Note: Sometimes known as OSGB36, the grid reference (where provided) is based on the British national grid reference system used by the Ordnance Survey. • "Guide to National Grid". Ordnance Survey. • "Get-a-map". Ordnance Survey.)	Geo-coordinates	Notes	LB number (Note: Historic Environment Scotland assign a unique alphanumeric identifier to each designated site in Scotland, for listed buildings this always begins with "LB", for example "LB12345".)	Image
Aberlour Burial Ground, Remains Of Former Parish Church Of St Drostan, (Dunstan Or Durston) And Macpherson Grant Mausoleum				57°28′09″N 3°13′46″W	Category B	2347	Upload another image
Aberlour Home Farm, Former Gardeners' Cottages				57°28′28″N 3°12′04″W	Category C(S)	2348	Upload Photo
Carron House				57°27′20″N 3°17′03″W	Category C(S)	2362	Upload another image
Victoria Bridge Over River Spey				57°28′13″N 3°13′54″W	Category A	20873	Upload another image See more images
Aberlour Parish Church (Church Of Scotland)				57°28′16″N 3°13′34″W	Category B	20866	Upload another image See more images
Mary Avenue, Aberlour Primary School And Enclosing Walls				57°28′09″N 3°13′32″W	Category B	20870	Upload another image See more images
Aberlour House and Terrace (Aberlour House Preparatory School)				57°28′37″N 3°12′12″W	Category A	2349	Upload another image See more images
Aberlour House, Stables				57°28′36″N 3°12′10″W	Category B	2350	Upload Photo
Aberlour House, Column				57°28′41″N 3°12′18″W	Category B	2351	Upload Photo
Aberlour House, East Lodge, Gatepiers And Gates				57°28′49″N 3°11′57″W	Category A	2352	Upload another image
Aberlour House, Walled Garden				57°28′30″N 3°12′02″W	Category B	2354	Upload Photo
Craigellachie, 1 And Allandale (R) Victoria Street				57°29′24″N 3°11′17″W	Category C(S)	2356	Upload Photo
Aberlour House, Chef's House (Aberlour House Preparatory School)				57°28′30″N 3°12′03″W	Category B	2361	Upload Photo
7 Victoria Terrace, Old School (Former Drill Hall)				57°28′15″N 3°13′35″W	Category C(S)	20874	Upload another image
36 High Street, Heath Cottage, Former Stables/Gighouse And Garden Wall				57°28′24″N 3°13′16″W	Category C(S)	20867	Upload Photo
70,72 High Street				57°28′18″N 3°13′25″W	Category C(S)	20869	Upload Photo
St Margaret's Episcopal Church And Burial Ground				57°28′21″N 3°12′56″W	Category A	20872	Upload another image See more images
Aberlour, The Old Manse (Former C Of S Manse), Former Stables And Garden Wall				57°28′06″N 3°13′48″W	Category B	5276	Upload Photo
Kinermony House, Gate Lodge And Garage				57°27′41″N 3°14′46″W	Category C(S)	2360	Upload Photo
Aberlour Orphanage, Clock Tower				57°28′19″N 3°13′02″W	Category C(S)	20865	Upload another image
54 High Street, Old Free Church Manse And Garden Wall				57°28′21″N 3°13′22″W	Category B	20868	Upload Photo
Aberlour, Bridge Of Skirdustan Over Burn Of Aberlour Or Lour Burn				57°28′06″N 3°13′45″W	Category C(S)	5277	Upload Photo
Aberlour House, West Lodge, Gatepiers And Gates				57°28′34″N 3°12′39″W	Category A	2353	Upload another image
Old Bridge Over River Spey (Telford Bridge), Craigellachie				57°29′29″N 3°11′38″W	Category A	2357	Upload another image See more images
Fisherton				57°28′31″N 3°12′45″W	Category B	2358	Upload Photo
Kinermony House And Garden Wall				57°27′44″N 3°14′44″W	Category B	2359	Upload Photo
Charlestown Of Aberlour, The Mash Tun Bar				57°28′15″N 3°13′39″W	Category C(S)	49987	Upload another image See more images
Queen's Road, Fleming Hall And Cottage Abutting Rear Gable				57°28′11″N 3°13′25″W	Category B	20871	Upload another image See more images
Craigellachie, John Street, Primary School And Front Railings				57°29′24″N 3°11′08″W	Category B	2355	Upload another image

== Key ==
The scheme for classifying buildings in Scotland is:

- Category A: "buildings of national or international importance, either architectural or historic; or fine, little-altered examples of some particular period, style or building type."
- Category B: "buildings of regional or more than local importance; or major examples of some particular period, style or building type, which may have been altered."
- Category C: "buildings of local importance; lesser examples of any period, style, or building type, as originally constructed or moderately altered; and simple traditional buildings which group well with other listed buildings."

In March 2016 there were 47,288 listed buildings in Scotland. Of these, 8% were Category A, and 50% were Category B, with the remaining 42% being Category C.

== See also ==
- List of listed buildings in Moray
