= List of listed buildings in Dallas, Moray =

This is a list of listed buildings in the parish of Dallas in Moray, Scotland.

== List ==
Name	Location	Date Listed	Grid Ref. (Note: Sometimes known as OSGB36, the grid reference (where provided) is based on the British national grid reference system used by the Ordnance Survey. • "Guide to National Grid". Ordnance Survey. • "Get-a-map". Ordnance Survey.)	Geo-coordinates	Notes	LB Number (Note: Historic Environment Scotland assign a unique alphanumeric identifier to each designated site in Scotland, for listed buildings this always begins with "LB", for example "LB12345".)	Image
Dallas Lodge, Kennels Cottage				57°33′22″N 3°29′34″W	Category C(S)	2340	Upload Photo
Kellas House, Gate Lodge				57°34′06″N 3°23′39″W	Category B	2346	Upload Photo
Dallas Lodge And Gatepiers (South Entrance)				57°33′21″N 3°29′24″W	Category B	2338	Upload Photo
Dallas Parish Church (Church Of Scotland, Watch-House, Cross And Burial Ground				57°32′54″N 3°28′08″W	Category B	2342	Upload Photo
Dallas, St Michael's Manse (Former Church Of Scotland Manse)				57°32′54″N 3°27′11″W	Category C(S)	2343	Upload Photo
Dallas Lodge, Dallas Cottage And Netherwood				57°33′23″N 3°29′31″W	Category C(S)	2339	Upload Photo
Kellas House				57°34′04″N 3°23′45″W	Category A	2345	Upload Photo
Dallas, Cots Of Rhininver				57°33′11″N 3°28′53″W	Category B	2341	Upload Photo
Dallas War Memorial				57°33′05″N 3°28′12″W	Category B	2344	Upload Photo

== Key ==
The scheme for classifying buildings in Scotland is:

- Category A: "buildings of national or international importance, either architectural or historic; or fine, little-altered examples of some particular period, style or building type."
- Category B: "buildings of regional or more than local importance; or major examples of some particular period, style or building type, which may have been altered."
- Category C: "buildings of local importance; lesser examples of any period, style, or building type, as originally constructed or moderately altered; and simple traditional buildings which group well with other listed buildings."

In March 2016 there were 47,288 listed buildings in Scotland. Of these, 8% were Category A, and 50% were Category B, with the remaining 42% being Category C.

== See also ==
- List of listed buildings in Moray
