= List of listed buildings in Drainie, Moray =

This is a list of listed buildings in the parish of Drainie in Moray, Scotland.

== List ==
Name	Location	Date Listed	Grid Ref. (Note: Sometimes known as OSGB36, the grid reference (where provided) is based on the British national grid reference system used by the Ordnance Survey. • "Guide to National Grid". Ordnance Survey. • "Get-a-map". Ordnance Survey.)	Geo-coordinates	Notes	LB Number (Note: Historic Environment Scotland assign a unique alphanumeric identifier to each designated site in Scotland, for listed buildings this always begins with "LB", for example "LB12345".)	Image
Gordonstoun, West Lodge And Gatepiers				57°42′07″N 3°22′57″W	Category C(S)	2217	Upload Photo
Gordonstoun, Michael Kirk (St Michael's Ogstoun) Burial Ground And Walls, Cross				57°42′11″N 3°21′22″W	Category A	2242	Upload Photo
Kineddar, The Captain's House Steading				57°42′36″N 3°18′22″W	Category C(S)	2248	Upload Photo
Gordonstoun, Michael Kirk Lodge				57°42′14″N 3°21′08″W	Category B	2241	Upload Photo
Kineddar, The Captain's House (Former Drainie Manse), Garden Walls And Gate-Piers				57°42′34″N 3°18′23″W	Category B	2247	Upload Photo
Gordonstoun, Round Square Dovecot				57°42′11″N 3°22′19″W	Category B	2216	Upload Photo
Gordonstoun, Round Square				57°42′08″N 3°22′17″W	Category A	2244	Upload another image
Gordonstoun, Windmill Dovecot				57°42′26″N 3°21′51″W	Category B	2246	Upload Photo
Gordonstoun House, Adjoining Garden Walls And Water Tower				57°42′12″N 3°22′13″W	Category A	2239	Upload another image
Gordonstoun, East Lodge And Gatepiers				57°42′31″N 3°21′23″W	Category C(S)	2240	Upload Photo
Gordonstoun, North Drive Gates And Gatepiers				57°42′22″N 3°22′22″W	Category B	2243	Upload Photo
Kineddar Cross And Kineddar Burial Ground Walls				57°42′34″N 3°18′18″W	Category B	2249	Upload Photo
Plewlands				57°42′35″N 3°22′52″W	Category B	2250	Upload Photo

== Key ==
The scheme for classifying buildings in Scotland is:

- Category A: "buildings of national or international importance, either architectural or historic; or fine, little-altered examples of some particular period, style or building type."
- Category B: "buildings of regional or more than local importance; or major examples of some particular period, style or building type, which may have been altered."
- Category C: "buildings of local importance; lesser examples of any period, style, or building type, as originally constructed or moderately altered; and simple traditional buildings which group well with other listed buildings."

In March 2016 there were 47,288 listed buildings in Scotland. Of these, 8% were Category A, and 50% were Category B, with the remaining 42% being Category C.

== See also ==
- List of listed buildings in Moray
