= List of castles in Moray =

This is a list of castles in Moray, Scotland.

== List ==
Name	Type	Date	Condition	Ownership	Location	Notes	Picture
Aikenway Castle			Ruined				
Asliesk Castle	L-plan Tower house	16th century	Ruined		About 7 miles (11 km) west of Elgin		
Auchindoun Castle			Ruined		Dufftown		
Ballindalloch Castle	Historic House	1546		Private			
Balvenie Castle			Ruined	Historic Scotland	Dufftown		
Blairfindy Castle			Ruined				
Blervie Castle	Z-plan castle	16th century	Ruined		Near Forres		
Brodie Castle	fortified house		complete	National Trust for Scotland	Nairnshire	Open to public	
Burgie Castle	Z-plan	17th century	Ruined		Near Forres		
Coxton Tower	Tower House	Between 1571 and 1584	Ruined	Private	Near Lhanbryde	Open by appointment	
Craigneach Castle	L-plan Tower House		No remains		East of Carron, Strathspey		
Cullen Castle			Ruin				
Cullen House			private dwellings				Cullen Castle drawn by Robert Adam
Darnaway Castle	Historic house						
Deskie Castle			No remains				
Deskford Tower	14th century		Ruined		Near Cullen		
Drumin Castle			Ruined				
Duffus Castle			Ruined	Historic Scotland		Open to public	
Dunphail Castle	14th century		Ruined		Near Dunphail House		
Earnside Castle	Site	15th century	No remains		57.6427°N 3.4932°W		
Elgin Castle			Ruined				
Findochty Castle			Ruined				
Forres Castle			No remains				
Gauldwell Castle	Enclosure castle	13th century	Ruined		57.4911°N 3.1512°W		
Gordon Castle	Historic house			Private			
Hempriggs Castle	Castle		No remains		57.6576640°N 3.5037291°W		
Inverugie Castle	Castle		No remains		57.6987260°N 3.4238680°W		
Kilbuaick Castle			No remains				
Kininvie Castle				Private			
Kinneddar Castle			No remains				
Pitlurg Castle			Ruined				
Quarrelwood Castle		14th century	No remains				
Rothes Castle			Ruined				
Rothiemay Castle			Ruined				
Spynie Palace			Ruined	Historic Scotland		Open to public - visited by Mary Queen of Scots	David's Tower, Spynie Palace
Skeith Castle			No remains				
Castle Stripe			Ruined				
Tor Castle, Dallas		15th century	Ruined		Dallas, Moray	57.55860°N 3.46354°W	Tor Castle
Tronach Castle			No remains		Portknockie		

== See also ==
- Castles in Scotland
- List of castles in Scotland
- List of listed buildings in Moray
