= List of Category A listed buildings in Moray =

Moray shown within Scotland

This is a list of Category A listed buildings in the Moray council area in north-east Scotland.

In Scotland, a listed building is a building or other structure designated as of "special architectural or historic interest". Category A structures are those considered to be "buildings of national or international importance, either architectural or historic; or fine, little-altered examples of some particular period, style or building type." Listing was begun by a provision in the Town and Country Planning (Scotland) Act 1947, and the current legislative basis for listing is the Planning (Listed Buildings and Conservation Areas) (Scotland) Act 1997. The authority for listing rests with Historic Environment Scotland, a non-departmental public body of the Scottish Government, which inherited this role from Historic Scotland in 2015 and in turn from the Scottish Development Department in 1991. Once listed, severe restrictions are imposed on the modifications allowed to a building's structure or its fittings. Listed building consent must be obtained from local authorities prior to any alteration to such a structure. There are approximately 47,400 listed buildings in Scotland, of which around 8% (some 3,800) are Category A.

The council area of Moray covers 2,238 square kilometres (864 sq mi), and has a population of around 87,700. There are 117 Category A listed buildings in the area.

== Listed buildings ==
Name	Location	Date listed	Geo-coordinates	Notes	LB number	Image
The Gordon Tomb, Bellie Burial Ground	Bellie, Fochabers		57°38′03″N 3°05′05″W		1539	Upload another image See more images
Gordon Chapel (Episcopal Church) and Gordon Chapel House (Parsonage)	Fochabers, Castle Street		57°36′55″N 3°05′47″W		1549	Upload another image See more images
Milne's High School	Fochabers, High Street		57°36′41″N 3°05′30″W		1560	Upload another image See more images
Gordon Castle, East Lodge	Fochabers		57°36′50″N 3°05′33″W		1584	Upload another image
Gordon Castle	Fochabers		57°37′17″N 3°05′19″W		1595	Upload another image See more images
Gordon Castle Tower	Fochabers		57°37′17″N 3°05′24″W		1596	Upload another image
Tugnet Salmon Fishing Station (Wildlife Centre)	Spey Bay		57°40′24″N 3°05′33″W		1604	Upload another image See more images
Tugnet Ice House	Spey Bay		57°40′24″N 3°05′33″W		1605	Upload another image See more images
Tynet, Roman Catholic Chapel of St Ninian	Tynet, Buckie		57°38′13″N 3°02′31″W		1609	Upload another image See more images
Bellie Kirk	Fochabers, The Square		57°36′50″N 3°05′52″W		1616	Upload another image See more images
Gordon Castle, West Lodge	Fochabers		57°37′01″N 3°06′05″W		1621	Upload another image
Gordon Castle Farm	Fochabers		57°37′04″N 3°04′59″W		1623	Upload another image
Gordon Castle Gardens, Lakeside House	Fochabers		57°37′05″N 3°05′41″W		1628	Upload Photo
Gordon Castle, Swiss Cottage	Fochabers		57°37′17″N 3°03′25″W		1635	Upload Photo
Dunphail House	Logie, Forres		57°30′35″N 3°39′14″W		2171	Upload Photo
Edinkillie House (Former Edinkillie Church of Scotland manse)	Logie, Forres		57°29′55″N 3°38′10″W		2188	Upload another image See more images
Old Church of St John	Kirktown of Deskford, Cullen		57°38′32″N 2°49′28″W		2209	Upload another image See more images
Cullen Old Church	Cullen		57°41′04″N 2°49′40″W		2218	Upload another image See more images
Cullen House	Cullen		57°41′02″N 2°49′45″W		2219	Upload another image See more images
Cullen House, bridge over the Burn of Cullen	Cullen		57°41′00″N 2°49′49″W		2220	Upload another image
Cullen House, Main Entrance	Cullen		57°40′52″N 2°49′29″W		2227	Upload Photo
Gordonstoun House	Duffus		57°42′12″N 3°22′13″W		2239	Upload another image See more images
Gordonstoun, Michael Kirk (St Michael's Ogstoun)	Duffus		57°42′10″N 3°21′22″W		2242	Upload Photo
Gordonstoun, Round Square	Duffus		57°42′08″N 3°22′17″W		2244	Upload another image See more images
Brodie Castle	Forres		57°35′54″N 3°42′32″W		2260	Upload another image See more images
Dyke Parish Church	Dyke		57°36′16″N 3°41′30″W		2269	Upload another image See more images
Moy House	Forres		57°37′08″N 3°39′01″W		2275	Upload another image See more images
Moy Mains, former stables and carriage-houses	Forres		57°37′15″N 3°38′53″W		2276	Upload Photo
Darnaway Castle	Forres		57°34′28″N 3°40′59″W		2283	Upload another image See more images
Darnaway Castle, East Lodge	Forres		57°35′28″N 3°41′03″W		2287	Upload Photo
Darnaway Castle, West Lodge	Forres		57°34′46″N 3°42′54″W		2288	Upload Photo
Birnie Parish Church	Birnie, Elgin		57°36′41″N 3°19′47″W		2294	Upload another image See more images
Drummuir Castle	Drummuir		57°28′58″N 3°03′00″W		2296	Upload Photo
Mill of Towie	Keith		57°30′41″N 2°59′27″W		2303	Upload another image See more images
Arndilly House	Craigellachie		57°30′31″N 3°11′09″W		2314	Upload another image See more images
Boat of Brig Tollhouse	Boat o' Brig, Rothes		57°33′01″N 3°08′24″W		2324	Upload another image See more images
Milton Brodie House	Kinloss		57°38′50″N 3°31′22″W		2336	Upload another image See more images
Kellas House	Kellas		57°34′04″N 3°23′45″W		2345	Upload Photo
Aberlour House (Aberlour House Preparatory School)	Aberlour		57°28′37″N 3°12′12″W		2349	Upload another image See more images
Aberlour House, East Lodge	Aberlour		57°28′49″N 3°11′57″W		2352	Upload Photo
Aberlour House, West Lodge	Aberlour		57°28′34″N 3°12′39″W		2353	Upload Photo
Craigellachie, Old Bridge over River Spey (Telford Bridge)	Craigellachie		57°29′29″N 3°11′38″W		2357	Upload another image See more images
Pittendreich Dovecot	Pittendreich, Elgin		57°38′03″N 3°20′55″W		8439	Upload Photo
Pluscarden Abbey	Elgin		57°36′01″N 3°26′14″W		8441	Upload another image See more images
Ballindalloch Castle	Ballindalloch		57°24′43″N 3°22′09″W		8449	Upload another image See more images
Ballindalloch Castle, Dovecot	Ballindalloch		57°24′49″N 3°22′15″W		8450	Upload another image
Scalan	Glenlivet		57°15′35″N 3°15′02″W		8453	Upload another image See more images
Ballindalloch Castle, Swiss Cottage	Ballindalloch		57°24′24″N 3°21′44″W		8460	Upload Photo
Bridge of Avon over River Avon	Ballindalloch		57°24′22″N 3°21′39″W		8462	Upload another image See more images
Former railway bridge over River Spey	Ballindalloch		57°24′50″N 3°23′08″W		8466	Upload another image See more images
Roman Catholic Church of Our Lady of Perpetual Succour	Chapeltown, Glenlivet		57°16′24″N 3°15′33″W		8470	Upload another image See more images
Roman Catholic Church of The Incarnation	Tombae, Glenlivet	Category B in 1972; upgraded to A in 1987	57°18′54″N 3°18′04″W		8476	Upload another image See more images
Carron Bridge (River Spey) over River Spey	Carron, Aberlour		57°27′15″N 3°17′38″W		8495	Upload another image See more images
Grange Hall	Kinloss		57°37′30″N 3°34′08″W		8661	Upload Photo
East Grange Mill	Kinloss		57°38′09″N 3°31′02″W		8665	Upload Photo
Kinloss Home Farm, barn	Kinloss		57°38′00″N 3°34′06″W		8678	Upload Photo
Dallas Dhu Distillery	Forres		57°35′23″N 3°36′50″W		8689	Upload another image See more images
Findhorn Viaduct	Forres, over River Findhorn		57°36′27″N 3°38′26″W		8690	Upload another image See more images
Invererne House	Forres		57°37′29″N 3°37′19″W		8692	Upload Photo
Ballantruan	Strathavon		57°18′36″N 3°25′02″W		8918	Upload Photo
Knockando Woolmill	Knockando		57°27′58″N 3°21′20″W		13624	Upload another image See more images
Innes House	Urquhart		57°40′09″N 3°12′35″W		14862	Upload another image See more images
Longhill Mill (now dwelling house)	Longhill, Lhanbryde		57°38′48″N 3°13′29″W		14871	Upload another image
Cairnfield House	Buckie		57°38′53″N 2°58′57″W		15517	Upload Photo
Cullen House, Temple of Pomona	Cullen		57°41′32″N 2°49′58″W		15520	Upload Photo
St Gregory's Roman Catholic Church	Preshome, Buckie		57°38′21″N 2°59′24″W		15524	Upload another image See more images
Chapel House, Garden Store and wall enclosing house, garden and church	Preshome, Buckie		57°38′21″N 2°59′18″W		15525	Upload Photo
Leitcheston Dovecot	Leitcheston, Buckie		57°38′54″N 3°00′29″W		15540	Upload Photo
Letterfourie House	Buckie		57°38′50″N 2°55′45″W		15541	Upload Photo
Craigmin Bridge over Burn of Letterfourie (within grounds of Letterfourie House)	Buckie		57°38′44″N 2°56′17″W		15542	Upload another image See more images
Blervie Mains House	Blervie, Forres		57°35′38″N 3°34′13″W		15582	Upload Photo
1-8 (inclusive nos) Foresters' Cottages (Cothall Cottages)	Altyre, Forres		57°34′24″N 3°38′19″W		15599	Upload Photo
Altyre, Stables	Altyre, Forres		57°34′18″N 3°36′43″W		15607	Upload Photo
Mains of Mayen	Rothiemay		57°31′05″N 2°42′42″W		15610	Upload Photo
Rothiemay House, Kiln Barn	Rothiemay		57°31′26″N 2°45′03″W		15618	Upload Photo
(Old) Spey Bridge	Fochabers		57°37′13″N 3°06′24″W		15645	Upload another image See more images
Coxton Tower	Lhanbryde		57°37′50″N 3°14′16″W		15774	Upload another image See more images
Lhanbryde Burial Ground, Innes Enclosure	Lhanbryde		57°38′07″N 3°13′17″W		15797	Upload Photo
Pittensair	Lhanbryde		57°37′49″N 3°12′13″W		15803	Upload Photo
Kininvie House	Dufftown		57°28′54″N 3°08′16″W		15862	Upload another image See more images
Mortlach Parish Church	Dufftown		57°26′20″N 3°07′41″W		15864	Upload another image See more images
Blairs Home Farm with Tower Cottages, Pond Cottage and Clubhouse	Altyre, Forres		57°34′34″N 3°37′36″W		17429	Upload Photo
St Margaret's Episcopal Church	Aberlour		57°28′21″N 3°12′56″W		20872	Upload another image See more images
Victoria Bridge over River Spey	Aberlour		57°28′13″N 3°13′54″W		20873	Upload another image See more images
St Peter's Roman Catholic Church	Buckie, St Andrew's Square		57°40′25″N 2°58′33″W		22720	Upload another image See more images
94 Granary Street Warehouse (facing N Quay)	Burghead		57°42′10″N 3°29′52″W		22747	Upload Photo
Convent of Mercy, Chapel	Elgin, Abbey Street		57°38′53″N 3°18′34″W		30681	Upload another image
Convent of Mercy, Convent Buildings	Elgin, Abbey Street		57°38′52″N 3°18′34″W		30682	Upload another image See more images
Little Cross	Elgin, High Street		57°38′56″N 3°18′36″W		30709	Upload another image See more images
St Giles' Church (Church of Scotland)	Elgin, High Street		57°38′55″N 3°18′56″W		30713	Upload another image See more images
Elgin Museum and Museum Hall	Elgin, High Street		57°38′58″N 3°18′37″W		30714	Upload another image See more images
Braco's Banking House	Elgin, High Street		57°38′56″N 3°18′37″W		30720	Upload another image See more images
Duke of Gordon's Monument	Elgin, Lady Hill		57°38′54″N 3°19′21″W		30775	Upload another image See more images
42-46 High Street	Elgin		57°38′56″N 3°18′46″W		30779	Upload Photo
50-52 High Street	Elgin		57°38′56″N 3°18′47″W		30780	Upload Photo
South Villa	Elgin, Moss Street		57°38′42″N 3°18′41″W		30839	Upload Photo
Elgin Cathedral	Elgin, North College Street		57°39′02″N 3°18′20″W		30853	Upload another image See more images
Elgin Cathedral, Bishop's House	Elgin, North College Street		57°39′04″N 3°18′24″W		30854	Upload another image See more images
Elgin Cathedral, Pansport and Precinct Wall	Elgin, North College Street		57°39′00″N 3°18′11″W		30863	Upload Photo
Dr Gray's Hospital	Elgin, Pluscarden Road		57°38′45″N 3°19′43″W		30864	Upload another image See more images
Anderson's Institution (The Elgin Institution for Support of Old Age and Education of Youth)	Elgin, Institution Road		57°38′53″N 3°18′17″W		30895	Upload another image
Ingleside (Formerly The Cottage)	Elgin, West Road		57°38′49″N 3°19′42″W		30914	Upload Photo
Tolbooth	Forres, High Street		57°36′36″N 3°36′46″W		31692	Upload another image See more images
102 High Street, Bank of Scotland	Forres		57°36′35″N 3°36′49″W		31704	Upload Photo
St John's Episcopal Church	Forres, Victoria Road		57°36′45″N 3°36′25″W		31769	Upload another image See more images
Roman Catholic Church of St Thomas	Keith, Chapel Street		57°32′19″N 2°57′15″W		35623	Upload another image See more images
St Rufus Church (Church Of Scotland)	Keith, Church Road		57°32′37″N 2°57′15″W		35629	Upload another image See more images
Keith Old Bridge over River Isla	Keith, Regent Street		57°32′37″N 2°57′28″W		35661	Upload another image See more images
Strathisla Distillery	Keith, Seafield Avenue		57°32′48″N 2°57′18″W		35679	Upload another image See more images
Covesea Skerries Lighthouse	Lossiemouth		57°43′27″N 3°20′19″W		37605	Upload another image See more images
Harbour Master's Offices, Lossiemouth Fisheries Museum, and associated warehouses	Lossiemouth, Branderburgh Harbour		57°43′24″N 3°16′47″W		37609	Upload another image

== See also ==
- Scheduled monuments in Moray
