= List of listed buildings in Inveravon, Moray =

This is a list of listed buildings in the parish of Inveravon in Moray, Scotland.

== List ==
Name	Location	Date Listed	Grid Ref. (Note: Sometimes known as OSGB36, the grid reference (where provided) is based on the British national grid reference system used by the Ordnance Survey. • "Guide to National Grid". Ordnance Survey. • "Get-a-map". Ordnance Survey.)	Geo-coordinates	Notes	LB Number (Note: Historic Environment Scotland assign a unique alphanumeric identifier to each designated site in Scotland, for listed buildings this always begins with "LB", for example "LB12345".)	Image
Mary-Park Farmhouse				57°25′52″N 3°20′07″W	Category B	8475	Upload Photo
Tombae, Roman Catholic Church Of The Incarnation And Burial Ground				57°18′54″N 3°18′04″W	Category A	8476	Upload another image See more images
Ballindalloch Castle, Bow Cottage				57°24′51″N 3°21′59″W	Category B	8482	Upload Photo
Inveravon Parish Church (Church Of Scotland) Burial Ground And Gatepiers				57°25′16″N 3°21′43″W	Category B	8488	Upload another image See more images
Ballindalloch Castle, Former Mains Farm, Stables And Cartsheds				57°24′48″N 3°22′01″W	Category B	8451	Upload Photo
Ballindalloch Castle, Swiss Cottage				57°24′24″N 3°21′44″W	Category A	8460	Upload Photo
Braes Of Glenlivet, Buiternach Burial Ground				57°17′10″N 3°17′41″W	Category C(S)	8469	Upload Photo
Kilnmaichlie House And Gatepiers				57°22′18″N 3°21′46″W	Category B	8474	Upload Photo
Braes Of Glenlivet, Scalan, North Steading With Stable And Mill Wheel				57°15′36″N 3°15′06″W	Category B	8484	Upload Photo
Ballindalloch Castle, Walled Garden And Bothy				57°24′55″N 3°22′13″W	Category B	8459	Upload Photo
Ballindalloch, Delnashaugh Hotel				57°24′08″N 3°21′33″W	Category C(S)	8463	Upload Photo
Ballindalloch, Lagmore Farmhouse				57°24′18″N 3°22′05″W	Category C(S)	8465	Upload Photo
Blairfindy Castle				57°20′28″N 3°20′01″W	Category B	8467	Upload Photo
Tombae, Former Schoolhouse And School				57°18′51″N 3°18′00″W	Category C(S)	8478	Upload Photo
Tombreckachie Bridge Over Burn Of Tervie				57°21′04″N 3°19′52″W	Category C(S)	8480	Upload another image
Craggan, Old Manse Of Craggan, Walled Garden And Former Steading				57°22′29″N 3°21′05″W	Category B	8487	Upload Photo
Ballindalloch, Wester Belleheiglash				57°25′15″N 3°21′19″W	Category C(S)	8448	Upload Photo
Ballindalloch Castle				57°24′43″N 3°22′09″W	Category A	8449	Upload another image See more images
Ballindalloch, Bridge of Avon Over River Avon				57°24′22″N 3°21′39″W	Category A	8462	Upload another image See more images
Inveravon House, (Former Inveravon Church Of Scotland Manse) And Steading				57°25′16″N 3°21′46″W	Category B	8473	Upload Photo
Tombae, Former Roman Catholic Presbytery And Garden Wall				57°18′53″N 3°18′04″W	Category C(S)	8477	Upload Photo
Bridgend Of Glenlivet, Downan Bridge Over River Livet				57°21′11″N 3°20′27″W	Category C(S)	8485	Upload Photo
Auchbreck, The Old Manse And Steading				57°20′30″N 3°18′52″W	Category C(S)	8446	Upload Photo
Braes Of Glenlivet, Chapeltown Former School				57°16′25″N 3°15′33″W	Category C(S)	8452	Upload Photo
Braes Of Glenlivet, Scalan, South Steading With Mill Wheel				57°15′33″N 3°15′04″W	Category C(S)	8454	Upload Photo
Blacksboat Railway Station, Including Goods Shed, Platform And Boundary Walls				57°26′01″N 3°21′44″W	Category B	49841	Upload another image See more images
Tombae Farmhouse And Steading				57°18′46″N 3°17′52″W	Category B	8479	Upload Photo
Bridgend Of Glenlivet, Old Bridge Over River Livet				57°21′15″N 3°20′10″W	Category B	8486	Upload another image See more images
Ballindalloch, South Belleheiglash				57°25′09″N 3°21′31″W	Category C(S)	8447	Upload Photo
Ballindalloch Castle, East Lodge				57°25′00″N 3°21′34″W	Category B	8456	Upload Photo
Ballindalloch Castle, General James Grant Mausoleum				57°25′05″N 3°21′58″W	Category B	8457	Upload another image
Ballindalloch Castle, Gardener's Cottage				57°25′01″N 3°22′13″W	Category C(S)	8458	Upload Photo
Braes Of Glenlivet, Chapeltown, Roman Catholic Church Of Our Lady Of Perpetual Succour, Chapel House And Burial Ground				57°16′24″N 3°15′33″W	Category A	8470	Upload Photo
The Glenlivet Distillery, Offices, Warehouses And Visitor Centre				57°20′36″N 3°20′19″W	Category B	47431	Upload Photo
Braes Of Glenlivet, Scalan, Former RC Seminary And Cottage				57°15′35″N 3°15′03″W	Category A	8453	Upload another image See more images
Ballindalloch Castle, Gate Lodge And Entrance Arch				57°24′22″N 3°21′38″W	Category B	8461	Upload another image
Blairfindy Farmhouse				57°19′50″N 3°19′29″W	Category B	8468	Upload Photo
Braes Of Glenlivet, Chapeltown, Mont Abbey (Former School And Schoolhouse)				57°16′25″N 3°15′34″W	Category C(S)	8471	Upload Photo
Inveravon Parish Church, Macpherson - Grant Mausoleum				57°25′17″N 3°21′42″W	Category B	8472	Upload another image
Tomnavoulin, Bridge Of Livet Over River Livet				57°19′26″N 3°18′40″W	Category B	8481	Upload Photo
Ballindalloch Castle, Dovecot				57°24′49″N 3°22′15″W	Category A	8450	Upload another image
Ballindalloch Castle, Stables, And Stable Cottages				57°24′55″N 3°22′08″W	Category C(S)	8455	Upload Photo
Ballindalloch, Lady Macpherson - Grant Hall (Former Lady Macpherson - Grant School And Schoolhouse)				57°24′24″N 3°21′50″W	Category B	8464	Upload Photo
Ballindalloch, Former Railway Bridge Over River Spey				57°24′50″N 3°23′08″W	Category A	8466	Upload another image See more images

== Key ==
The scheme for classifying buildings in Scotland is:

- Category A: "buildings of national or international importance, either architectural or historic; or fine, little-altered examples of some particular period, style or building type."
- Category B: "buildings of regional or more than local importance; or major examples of some particular period, style or building type, which may have been altered."
- Category C: "buildings of local importance; lesser examples of any period, style, or building type, as originally constructed or moderately altered; and simple traditional buildings which group well with other listed buildings."

In March 2016 there were 47,288 listed buildings in Scotland. Of these, 8% were Category A, and 50% were Category B, with the remaining 42% being Category C.

== See also ==
- List of listed buildings in Moray
