= Scheduled monuments in Moray =

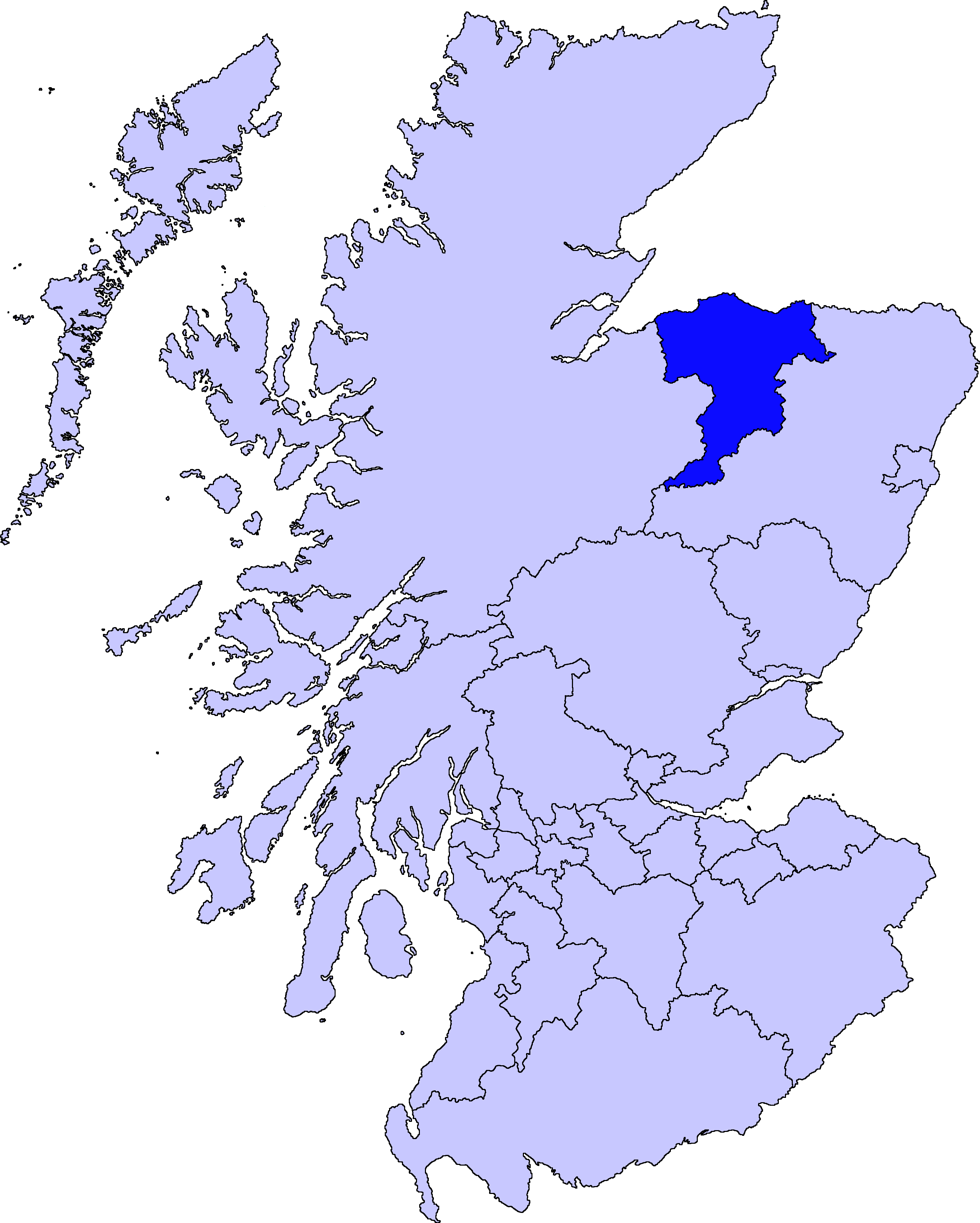
Moray shown within Scotland

A scheduled monument in Scotland is a nationally important archaeological site or monument which is given legal protection by being placed on a list (or "schedule") maintained by Historic Environment Scotland. The aim of scheduling is to preserve the country's most significant sites and monuments as far as possible in the form in which they have been inherited.

The process of scheduling is governed by the Ancient Monuments and Archaeological Areas Act 1979, which aims "to make provision for the investigation, preservation and recording of matters of archaeological or historical interest". The term "scheduled monument" can apply to the whole range of archaeological sites which have been deliberately constructed by human activity but are not always visible above ground. They range from prehistoric standing stones and burial sites, through Roman remains and medieval structures such as castles and monasteries, to later structures such as industrial sites and buildings constructed for the World Wars. Some buildings or structures which were both scheduled and listed have had their listing designations removed to reduce the duplication.

In 2017 there were 8238 scheduled monuments in Scotland.

== Notable Scheduled Monuments in Moray ==
| Name | Location | Description | Ref No | Image |
|---|---|---|---|---|
| Rothiemay Castle stone circle | Rothiemay | Stone circle | SM344 | |
| Drumin Castle | Inveravon, near Glenlivet | Ruined tower house | SM356 | |
| Altyre House inscribed stone | Rafford | Inscribed stone | SM1222 | |
| Rodney's Stone | Near Brodie Castle, Dyke and Moy | Two-metre high Pictish cross slab | SM1226 | |
| Kinloss Abbey | Kinloss | Ruined 12th-century Cistercian abbey | SM1227 | |
| Elgin Castle | Elgin | Ruined 12th-century castle | SM1229 | |
| Burghead Fort | Burghead | Remains of prehistoric promontory fort, graveyard and Clavie Stone | SM2205 | |
| Sculptor's Cave, Covesea | Drainie | Prehistoric remains of occupation | SM4220 | |
| Blervie Castle | Rafford | Ruined 17th-century Z-plan tower-house | SM5625 | |
| Burgie Castle | Rafford | Ruined late medieval tower house and dovecot | SM5496 | |
| Altyre Old Parish Church | Rafford | Remains of 14th century church | SM5809 | |
| Auchindoun Castle | Dufftown | Ruined 15th-century L-plan towerhouse | SM90024 | |
| Balvenie Castle | Dufftown | Ruins of 13th- to 16th-century castle | SM90028 | |
| Duffus Castle | Duffus | 13th- to 16th-century tower-house | SM90105 | |
| Elgin Cathedral | Elgin | Ruins of 13th-century cathedral | SM90142 | |
| Spynie Palace | Spynie | Remains of the palace of the bishops of Moray | SM90282 | |
| Sueno's Stone | Forres | Complex piece of early medieval sculpture | SM90292 | |

== See also ==
- List of Category A listed buildings in Moray
