= Harry Innes (disambiguation) =

Harry Innes was a US federal judge.

Harry Innes may also refer to:

- Sir Harry Innes, 4th Baronet (c. 1670-1721), Scottish politician and baronet
- Sir Harry Innes, 5th Baronet (died 1762), of the Innes baronets

== See also ==
- Henry Innes, Scottish peer and courtier
