= Innes baronets =

Set index for Innes baronets

There have been four baronetcies created for people with the surname Innes, three in the Baronetage of Nova Scotia and one in the Baronetage of the United Kingdom. Three of the creations are extant as of 2026.

- Innes baronets of Innes (1625)
- Innes baronets of Balvenie (1628)
- Innes baronets of Coxton (1686)
- Innes baronets of Lochalsh (1819): see Sir Hugh Innes, 1st Baronet

The family surname is pronounced "Innis".
