= Innes baronets of Coxton (1686) =

Escutcheon of the Innes baronets of Coxton

The Innes baronetcy, of Coxton in the County of Moray, was created in the Baronetage of Nova Scotia on 20 March 1686 for Alexander Innes, Member of the Scottish Parliament for Moray, with remainder to heirs male whatsoever. He was a descendant of John Innes of Coxton, grandson of Patrick Innes, great-great-great-uncle of the first of the Innes baronets of Balvenie.

The line of the 1st Baronet failed in 1803. The 7th Baronet was the great-grandson of John Innes, the younger brother of the 1st Baronet. This line of the family failed on the death of the 8th Baronet in 1886. The claim passed to Charles Innes, de jure 9th Baronet, a descendant of John Innes, great-uncle of the 1st Baronet.

The 11th Baronet proved his succession in 1973 and was placed on the Official Roll of the Baronetage.

== Innes baronets, of Coxton (1686) ==
- Sir Alexander Innes, 1st Baronet (c. 1652 – d. by 1715)
- Sir George Innes, 2nd Baronet (died c. December 1715)
- Sir Alexander Barclay-Innes, 3rd Baronet (c. 1715 – died by 1790)
- Sir James Innes, 4th Baronet (died 1790)
- Sir David Innes, 5th Baronet (died 1803)
- Sir Alexander Innes, 6th Baronet (died 1811)
- Sir David Innes, 7th Baronet (1781–1866)
- Sir George Innes, 8th Baronet (1834–1886) (dormant)
- Sir Charles Innes, de jure 9th Baronet (1825–1907)
- Sir Charles Gordon Deverell Innes, de jure 10th Baronet (1870–1953)
- Sir Charles Kenneth Gordon Innes, 11th Baronet (1910–1990) (claim allowed 1973)
- Sir David Charles Kenneth Gordon Innes, 12th Baronet (1940–2010)
- Sir Alastair Charles Deverell Innes, 13th Baronet (born 1970)
