= Bellie Kirk =

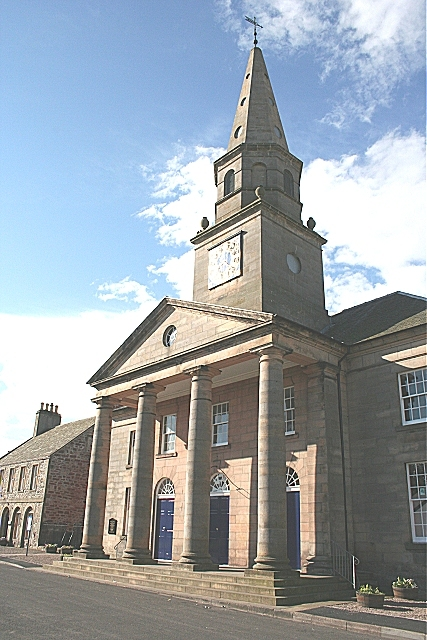
- The north-facing portico
- Bellie Kirk
- 57°36′50″N 3°05′49″W
- Location: Fochabers
- Country: Scotland
- Denomination: Church of Scotland

History
- Founded: 1798

Architecture
- Functional status: Active
- Heritage designation: Category A listed building

Bellie Kirk is a Georgian church of neoclassical design in Fochabers, Scotland, built in 1798 for the 4th Duke of Gordon. It has been in continuous use as a place of worship within the Church of Scotland, and is designated as a Category A listed building.

== History ==
The building was constructed between 1795 and 1798 for the 4th Duke of Gordon as the centrepiece for his planned village of Fochabers, to replace the existing parish church, now known as Bellie Old Church, which fell into disrepair after the congregation moved to Bellie Kirk. Little now remains of the old church itself, but the churchyard remained in use for some time and houses the 1826 Gordon Tomb.

Bellie Kirk was designed by John Baxter, an Edinburgh architect who had studied in Rome, and its exterior has remained largely unaltered since it was completed in 1798, although some repairs and alterations were carried out in 1835 under the direction of Archibald Simpson, who also designed the nearby Gordon Chapel. This work saw the reversal of the internal layout, and the application of Greek detailing.

The church's use as an active place of worship within the Church of Scotland has continued uninterrupted since it was built. Renovation work was carried out under George Bennet Mirchell and Son in 1954, in which the original orientation of the interior was restored. It was designated as a category A listed building in 1971. It underwent another substantial major renovation in 2010 under Rev Alison Mehigan, with the removal of the fixed pews in favour of movable seating, another reorientation of the nave, and the removal of the organ.

== Description ==
The church faces north towards Fochabers' High Street across The Square, presenting a tetrastyle portico frontage (the first of its kind in Scotland), with pedimented Roman Doric columns, all made of finely worked ashlar sandstone. The spire, the design of which was influenced by the work of James Gibbs, has a square clock stage, featuring a clock dated 1798, and an octagonal belfry, surmounted with a copper weathervane.

Three doors lead from the portico into the entrance lobby, which has mirrored staircases leading to the galleries, which run along the east and west sides, and may have been installed during Simpson's 1835 alterations; the galleries are supported by Greek Doric columns. A trilogy of stained glass windows by Shona McInnes was installed in 1998, showing images of growth and harvest, the tree of life, and the Holy Spirit at Pentecost.

== Current usage ==
The church is an active place of worship, with weekly Sunday services at 10.30 am. The current minister is Rev. Eddie Enslin.
