= Deskie Castle =

Tower house thought to have been in Scotland

Coordinates: 57.3554°N 3.3331°W

Deskie Castle was a medieval tower house that is thought to have been near Bridgend of Livet, Moray, Scotland.

== History ==
Little is known of the castle apart from a traditional rhyme:

Glenlivet it has castles three,
Drumin, Blairfindy and Deskie.

== Structure ==
Deskie Castle is the local name for an irregular oval knoll which is scarped and somewhat levelled. The mound runs about 90 metres (300 ft) north-west to south-east and about 36 metres (118 ft) north-east to south-west. The height is about 2.5 metres (8 ft 2 in). There are traces of walling around the edges to the west and north. There is evidence of another 1-metre wide (3 ft 3 in) wall crossing the summit. It is all on a boggy slope which faces south-west, while a natural escarpment overlooks on the north and east. Three short earthen banks, each around 9 miles (14 km) wide and 2 metres (7 ft) high, are located strategically to the west and north-west of the mound, but it is not known if the banks once formed an uninterrupted line of defence. The earthworks are not constructed in the motte-and-bailey style, but it is thought possible in view of the traditions associated with the site that they are the remains of a medieval stronghold. It is a scheduled monument.

== See also ==
- Castles in Great Britain and Ireland
- List of castles in Scotland
