= Covesea Skerries Lighthouse =

Lighthouse in Scotland

- The lighthouse photographed in June 1983
- Location: Lossiemouth; Moray; Scotland
- OS grid: NJ2037571273
- Coordinates: 57.724167°N 3.338580°W

Tower
- Constructed: 1846
- Built by: Alan Stevenson
- Construction: masonry tower
- Height: 36 metres (118 ft)
- Shape: cylindrical tower with balcony and lantern
- Markings: white tower, black lantern
- Power source: mains electricity
- Operator: Covesea Lighthouse Community Company
- Heritage: category A listed building

Light
- Deactivated: 2012
- Focal height: 49 metres (161 ft)
- Range: 24 nautical miles [44 km]
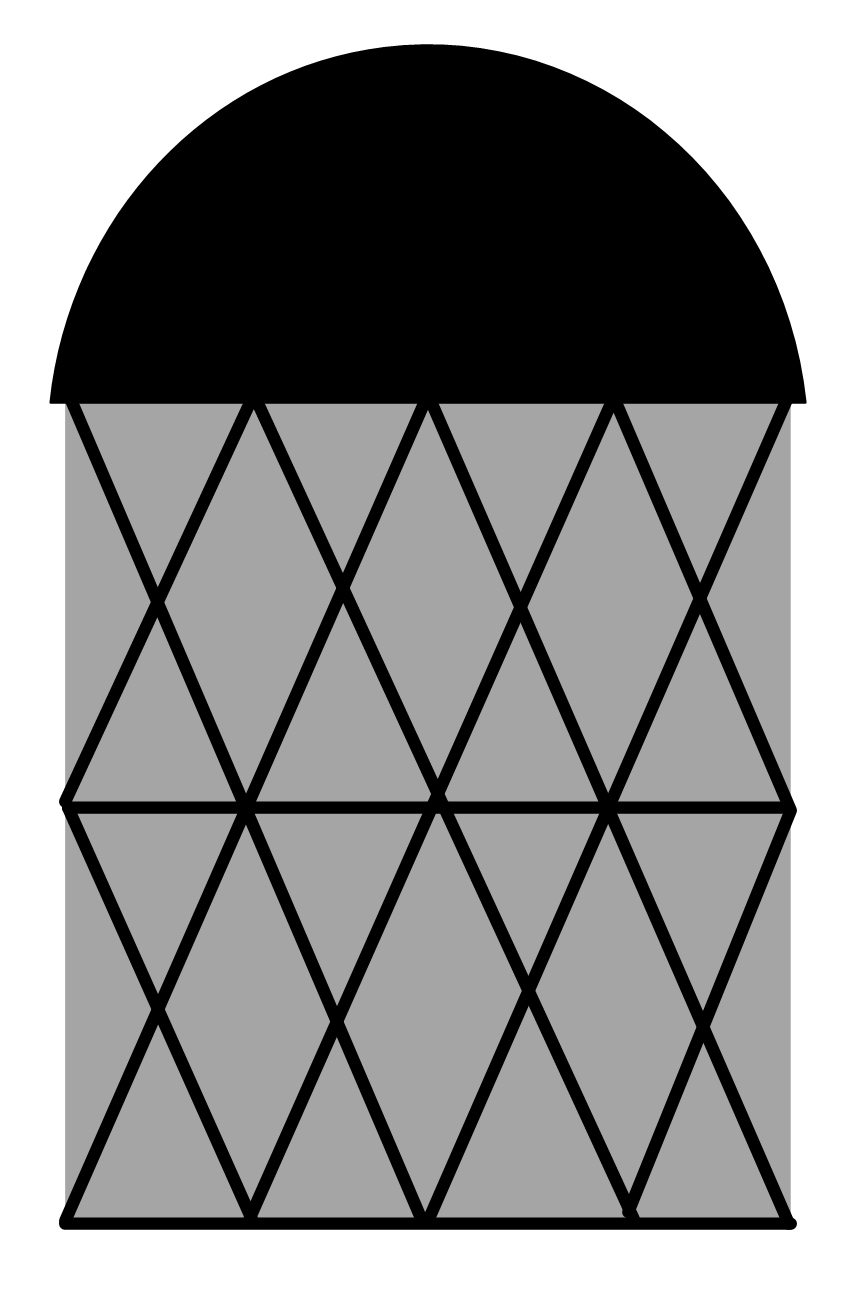
- Characteristic: was Fl.WR 20s 49m 24M Discontinued Now discontinued

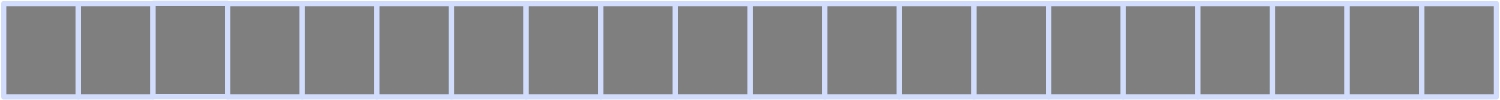

Listed Building – Category A
- Designated: 26 January 1971
- Reference no.: LB37605

Covesea Skerries Lighthouse, originally belonging to the Northern Lighthouse Board (NLB), is built on top of a small headland on the south coast of the Moray Firth at Covesea, near Lossiemouth, Moray, Scotland.

== History ==
Following a storm in the Moray Firth in November 1826 when 16 vessels were sunk, applications were made for lighthouses at Tarbat Ness, on the opposite coast, and at Covesea Skerries. The Commissioners of Northern Light Houses (the precursor of the NLB) and Trinity House felt that a lighthouse at Covesea was unnecessary but this was against public opinion. Many letters and petitions were delivered to them. Eventually, the engineer and a committee of the Board surveyed the coastline and the Elder Brethren were asked to look for the best location. They recommended a lighthouse on the Craighead with a beacon on Halliman's Skerries, to which the Commissioners agreed. A grid iron tower was erected on the Halliman's Skerries in 1845, and in 1846 the Covesea Skerries Lighthouse was completed at a cost of £11,514 (equivalent to £1,160,520 as of 2025).

The surrounding walls, because of their height, caused vortices in the yard area in strong winds. This interfered with lightkeepers lookout, so the walls were lowered in 1907.

In 1984, the lighthouse was automated and was remotely monitored and controlled at the Northern Lighthouse Board's offices in Edinburgh, but originally, the lens was rotated by a clockwork mechanism with gradually descending weights providing the energy. The original lens is on display at the Lossiemouth Fisheries and Community Museum.

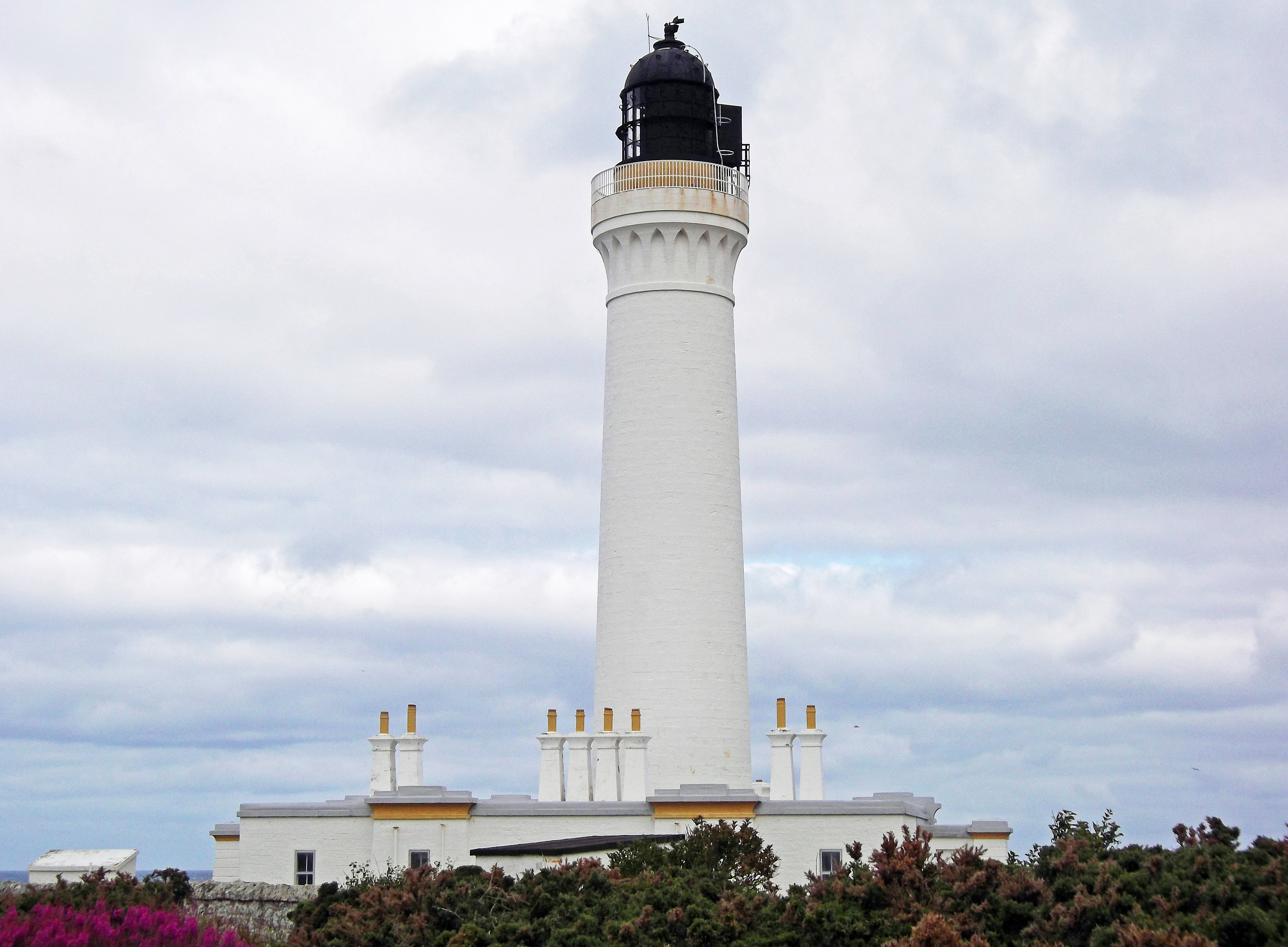
The lighthouse in 2011

The light was deactivated on 2 March 2012, after a North Cardinal buoy fitted with X band radar was installed in the Moray Firth on 21 February.

== Engineer ==
The lighthouse was designed and built by Alan Stevenson, a member of the Stevenson lighthouse engineering dynasty and uncle of the novelist Robert Louis Stevenson.

== Covesea Lighthouse Community Company Limited ==
After the lighthouse was decommissioned on 2 March 2012, the Northern Lighthouse Board no longer required the site at Covesea, and plans were put in place to sell the Category A Listed property. In July 2012 the NLB received notification from the Scottish Government that the Covesea Lighthouse Community Company Limited had registered an interest in the Covesea Skerries property under the terms contained in Part 2 of the Land Reform (Scotland) Act 2003. The Covesea Lighthouse Community Company was formed by the local business association in Lossiemouth to develop the lighthouse site for tourism.

The Covesea Lighthouse Community Company managed to secure a major grant from the Scottish Land Fund, and on 4 April 2013 the Northern Lighthouse Board sold the entire lighthouse complex at Covesea Skerries to the Covesea Lighthouse Community Company. The plan is now to develop the iconic landmark as a major tourism hub to promote local heritage, the area's unique wildlife and environment and its links to the nearby airbase at RAF Lossiemouth.

== See also ==
- List of lighthouses in Scotland
- List of Northern Lighthouse Board lighthouses
- List of Category A listed buildings in Moray
