= George Burn =

Scottish architect and building contractor

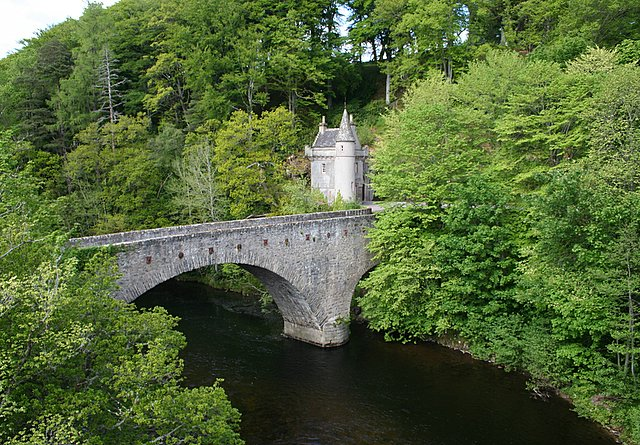
The Bridge of Avon at Ballindalloch, built by Burn in 1801

George Burn (1759 – c.1820) was an architect, civil engineer and contractor active in Scotland in the late 18th and early 19th centuries.

Burn was born in Yester in East Lothian in 1759. His career in bridge design started in 1797, when he worked with his elder brother James Burn on a bridge at Inverbervie. In 1798 he designed and built a two-span bridge at Bilsdean in East Lothian, and between 1800 and 1804 he built a number of bridges over rivers in Moray, including the Bridge of Avon at Ballindalloch, which is now a Category A listed building, as well as a number of ecclesiastical buildings, including two churches in Dingwall and Huntly, and a chapel in the Gordon Estate. He encountered financial difficulties connected with his work on the Spey Bridge at Fochabers, which led to his estate being sequestered in 1803.

By 1806 he was living in Wick, Caithness, working mainly as a masonry contractor on a number of bridges designed by Thomas Telford. A spell of ill-health forced him to be absent from some of the work on Telford's bridges, which exacerbated his financial problems, but the projects were nonetheless completed successfully.

In his later career, Burn worked on a number of harbour development projects. Telford recommended Burn to the British Fisheries Society in 1806 to work on the improvement of the fishing station at Pultneytown, where he built the piers and associated breastwork that formed the harbour. After that, he went on to work on other harbour construction projects in Kirkwall and Portmahomack.

Burn continued to live in Wick until his death, around 1820.
