= Marypark =

Hamlet in Moray, Scotland

Coordinates: 57.4299°N 3.3422°W

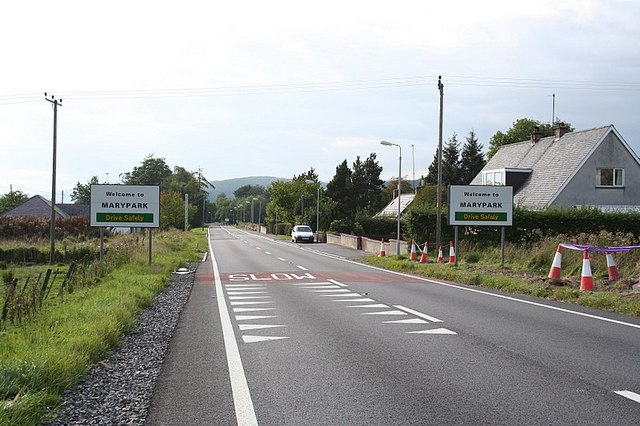
Marypark

Marypark is a hamlet in the civil parish of Inveravon in Moray, Scotland. It is 9 kilometres (5.6 mi) south-west of Charlestown of Aberlour on the A95 road in Strathspey. The Glenfarclas distillery is located 1.5 kilometres (0.93 mi) to the east of the hamlet.

In August 2024 it was announced that the Scottish Government and developers Storegga are both investing £3.1 million in order to create a "green hydrogen hub" at Marypark. It is anticipated that about 100 jobs will be created by the construction of this facility which aims to support the whisky industry. Moray is home to more than a third of Scotland’s 151 whisky distilleries and it is expected that the hydrogen produced by the hub will provide energy for 40 or more sites across the northeast. Acting Energy Secretary Gillian Martin MSP said that the hub will: "support decarbonisation of Scotland’s iconic whisky industry by creating clean energy and heat used for distilling and fuel for transportation.”
