= Edinkillie House =

Building in near Forres, Scotland

Coordinates: 57°29′55″N 3°38′10″W

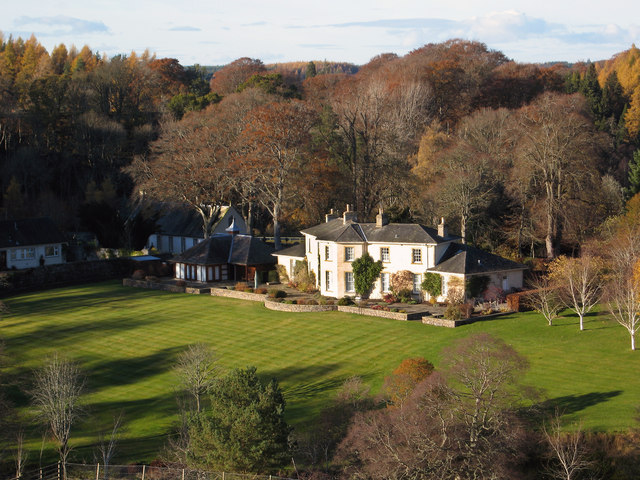
- Interactive map of the Edinkillie House area

General information
- Architectural style: Georgian
- Location: Edinkillie, near Forres, Scotland
- Construction started: 1822
- Completed: 1823; 203 years ago

Design and construction
- Architect: John Paterson
- Designations: Category A listed building

Edinkillie House is a country house in Edinkillie in Moray, Scotland, built in 1822–1823 by John Paterson as a manse for the nearby Edinkillie Church. It has been designated a Category A listed building.

== Description ==
Edinkillie House is a Georgian house, built in a Y-plan around a central south-facing bay in the shape of a half-octagon. Two-storey wings, each with two bays, project from the centre, with single-storey, single-bay extensions beyond them. The house presents large twelve-pane classical windows, and is harled with tooled ashlar detailing.

== History ==
Edinkillie House was built by John Paterson in 1822–1823, originally as the manse for Edinkillie Church. Its design was based upon plans that Paterson had unsuccessfully submitted for the construction of Dunphail House. A porch, with rustic columns, was added in 1902 by John Wittet, who may have done further work on the building in 1911. The building was designated a Category B listed building in 1971, and was upgraded to Category A in 1987.
