= John Baxter (architect) =

Scottish architect (died 1798)

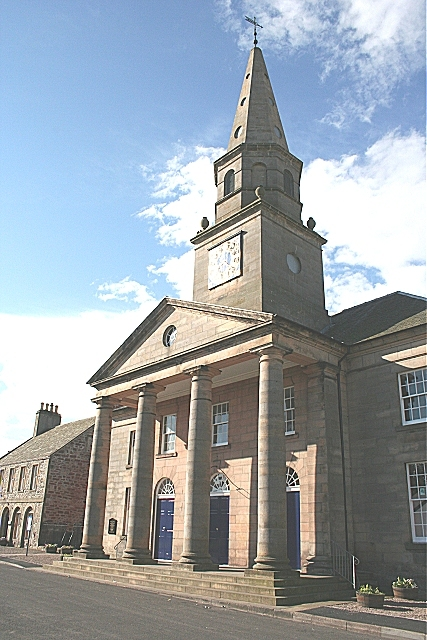
Bellie Kirk (1798) in Fochabers was designed by John Baxter

John Baxter (c. 1737 – 14 July 1798) was a Scottish architect who was active in the second half of the eighteenth century. His father, also called John Baxter (d. 1770), was a master mason from Edinburgh, and sent Baxter and his brother Alexander to Italy in 1761 to study architecture. Baxter became known amongst the expatriate artistic community in Rome, and entered a number of architectural competitions during his time there; in March 1766 he was inducted into the Academy of St Luke as an honorary member. Baxter and his father were both protégés of Sir John Clerk, and while in Rome he became acquainted with Alexander Runciman, another friend of Clerk's; a painting of 1767, currently in the Vatican's collection, depicts the two Baxter brothers with Runciman, alongside another artist (thought to be Henry Fuseli).

Upon returning to Scotland, Baxter took over his father's business, working both as an architect and a building contractor. He worked for the Duke of Gordon in his creation of the planned town of Fochabers, including the design for Bellie Kirk, made improvements to Cullen House for the Earl of Findlater, and also speculated in housebuilding in Edinburgh, where he died in 1798.
