= Little Cross =

Architectural structure in Moray, Scotland

Coordinates: 57°38′56″N 3°18′36″W

The Little Cross
- Muckle Cross (historic)
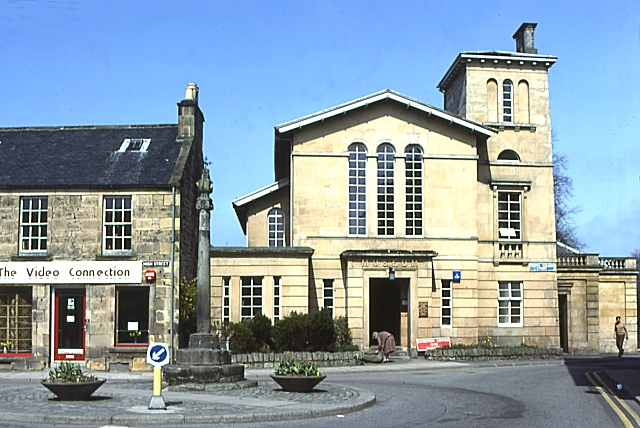
- The Little Cross, seen to the left of the Elgin Museum.
- Location: High Street in Elgin
- Designer: Alexander MacDonald
- Type: Round stone shaft capped by an Ionic capital.
- Width: 6-8 feet
- Height: 15 feet
- Completion date: 1733
- Restored date: 1867

The Little Cross is a monument in Elgin, Scotland, located at end of the city's High Street. It marks the boundary between secular Elgin and the religious Chanonry, a part of the town that had historically been given over to ecclesiastical governance under the Bishops of Moray. The Elgin Museum, one of the oldest in the country, is directly adjacent to the structure. The name 'Little Cross' differentiates it from Elgin's 'Muckle Cross' (Scots: Large Cross), the name of the town's market cross.

== Description ==
At the base of the structure is a round plinth with four steps, upon which is mounted a stone shaft roughly 15 feet (4.6 m) feet in height, topped by an ionic capital. The capital supports a four-sided sundial, above which is the fifteenth-century finial, believed to depict St. Giles on one side and the Madonna and child on the other. The cross is located in the middle of a roundabout at the intersection of High Street and the North and South College Streets.

== History ==
The cross was erected in 1733, but its carved finial may date from an original cross on the site, which was built in 1402 by Alexander Macdonald, third son of the Lord of the Isles, to atone for his attack on and theft from the Elgin Cathedral. W At the time of its construction it was substantially taller than structure today, and had a spiral staircase leading up it; however, it fell into disrepair, and the staircase and much of the structure itself collapsed. It was restored in 1867 without the sundial; a replica was erected in 1941 and the remains of the old cross are in the neighbouring Elgin Museum.

The Little Cross was designated as a scheduled monument in 1963, and as a Category A listed building in 1971; it was descheduled in 2016, but retains its Category A listing.
