= Asliesk Castle =

Coordinates: 57.6188°N 3.4940°W

Asliesk Castle is a ruined 16th-century castle about 7 miles (11 km) west of Elgin, Moray, Scotland, near Alves and Monoughty Woods at Asliesk.

== History ==
The property was owned by the Innes or Brodie families.

== Structure ==
Asliesk Castle was an L-plan castle, which had a corbelled-out stair tower, and bartizans. The foundations can be traced for some metres. The old well of the castle is in the farm-square nearby. A stone with a coat of arms bearing date 1587 is in a gable.
