= Earnside Castle =

Ruined castle in Scotland

EarnsideCastle

Location
- Coordinates: 57.6427°N 3.4932°W

Site history
- Built: 15th century

Earnside Castle was a 15th-century castle, about 6 miles (10 km) north-east of Forres, Moray, Scotland, and north of Alves Wood. It may be known as Ernside Castle.

The Cumyns of Altyr built the castle around 1450. There is no longer any significant trace of the castle. However, a large oblong cropmark, with some small oblongs in it, is visible and may be associated with it.

== See also ==
- Castles in Great Britain and Ireland
- List of castles in Scotland
