= Blervie Castle =

Coordinates: 57.595°N 3.5562°W

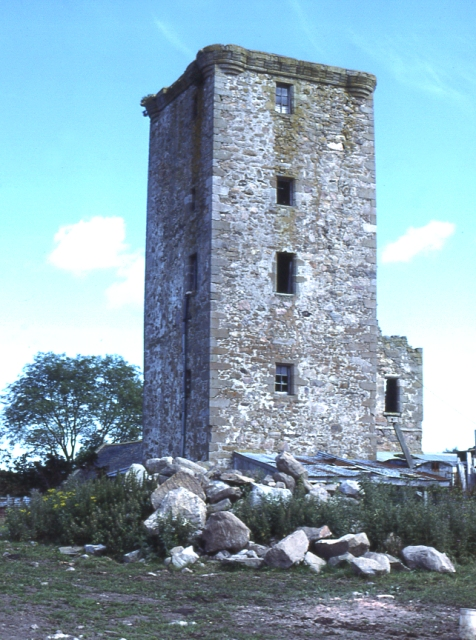

Blervie Castle is a ruined 16th-century Z-plan tower house, about 2.5 miles (4.0 km) south-east of Forres, Moray, Scotland, and about 1 mile (1.6 km) north-east of Rafford. Alternative names are Blare; Blarvie; Blairvie; Blervie Tower; and Ulerin.

== History ==
The property was originally held by the Comyns, and it is thought that there was a royal castle here in the 13th century - the Exchequer Rolls mention repair of the royal castle in anticipation of Haakon IV of Norway’s invasion of 1263. It passed to the Dunbars, who built the present castle in about 1600. The Mackintoshes purchased it early in the 18th century, and subsequently sold it to the Duffs of Braco, Earls Fife. In about 1776 the castle was partly demolished to build Blervie Mains.

== Structure ==
The only surviving parts of the castle are one of the projecting towers, with a little of the main block. It is a square tower, five storeys high, with a round staircase tower in the re-entrant angle. There are shot holes and gun loops in the walls, which are topped by a parapet with open rounds. The basement, first floor and top storey are vaulted.

== See also ==
- Castles in Great Britain and Ireland
- List of castles in Scotland
