= Tronach Castle =

Site of castle near Portknockie, Moray, Scotland

Coordinates: 57.7048°N 2.8792°W

Tronach Castle was a castle, about 0.5 miles (0.80 km) east of Portknockie, Moray, Scotland, near the shore.

== Description ==
The first Statistical Account of Scotland in the late 18th century reported that the ruins of a castle were to be seen. By the 1960s only the outline of a rectangular structure was visible on the flat summit of the rock; it is thought that this outline is that of the building mentioned. It was slightly raised above the level of the surrounding ground. There was no other evidence, and no visible stonework.

The rectangular area measures 12 metres (39 ft) by 6.5 metres (21 ft), and there are indications that other buildings may have existed towards the north-west. It is probable the entirety of the pinnacle would have been in use during its period of occupation. The site was designated a scheduled monument in 2004.

== See also ==
- Castles in Great Britain and Ireland
- List of castles in Scotland
