= Forres Castle =

Coordinates: 57.6082°N 3.6183°W

Forres Castle was a fort and castle built near Forres, Scotland. The fort was destroyed in 850 by Vikings. Forres was created a royal burgh by King David I of Scotland in 1140. The castle, once a royal castle, was built as a motte and bailey castle and was strengthened in the 14th century. It was demolished in 1297 by the adherents of Wallace. King William the Lion and King Alexander II of Scotland visited and stayed at the castle. King David II of Scotland stayed at the castle in 1346. It was burned by Alexander Stewart, Earl of Buchan in 1390. Held by the Dunbars of Westfield until the 17th century, it fell into ruins. Nothing now remains above ground.
