= Craigmin Bridge =

Bridge in Moray, Scotland

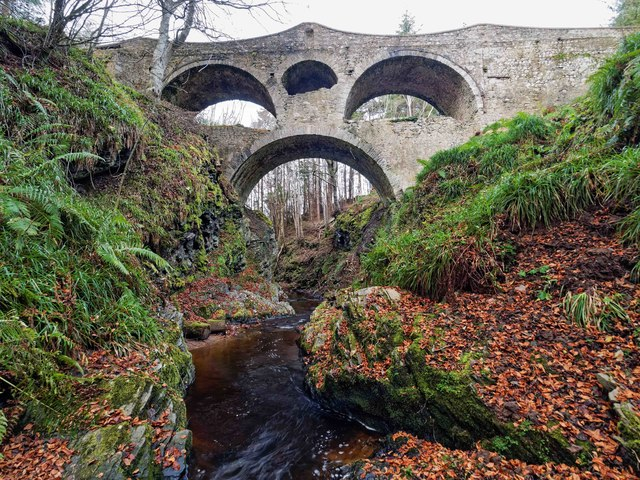
- Coordinates: 57.64557°N 2.93807°W
- OS grid reference: NJ 44103 62126
- Carries: Pedestrians
- Crosses: The Burn of Letterfourie

Characteristics
- Material: Rubble

History
- Designer: Robert Adam (probably)
- Construction end: Circa 1773

Listed Building – Category A
- Official name: Letterfourie, Craigmin Bridge Over Burn of Letterfourie
- Designated: 22 February 1972
- Reference no.: LB15542

Location
- Interactive map of Craigmin Bridge

Craigmin Bridge is an eighteenth century bridge within the grounds of Letterfourie House, in Drybridge, Moray, Scotland. Spanning the Burn of Letterfourie, it once formed part of the main approach road to the house. Probably built by Robert Adam, who designed the house, it is a Category A listed building, and is currently on the Buildings at Risk Register for Scotland.

== Description ==
The bridge has a very unusual two-tier design, with a lower, single-arched span supporting two semi-circular arches above, with a smaller segmental arch and a mural passage between them, and a shallow round-headed niche above in the spandrel. The structure is rubble-built, with end buttresses, an undulating parapet, and a later concrete cope. A doorway in the north-west corner of the bridge gives access to a small cell built into the structure.

The span of the lower arch is 36 feet 6 inches (11.13 m), and each of the upper arches has a 28 feet (8.5 m) span. The unusual design has been described as 'remarkable', 'curious' and 'wildly picturesque'.

== History ==
The bridge has existed in its current state since around 1773, when it was built to carry a carriage drive to Letterfourie House over the steep ravine of the Burn of Letterfourie. It is possible that the upper, two-span tier was built on top of an existing, single-span structure, giving rise to the unusual design. This would likely have been because the a road leading up the ravine from the level of the lower tier, while suitable for foot traffic, would have been too steep for a carriage to manage. It is probable that Robert Adam, who designed the house, also worked on the bridge, but no drawings or documentation survive to confirm this.

The bridge was designated a category A listed building in 1972. It was added to the Buildings at Risk Register for Scotland in 2008, due to the invasion of vegetation leading to bulging walls and the loss of pointing and masonry. Despite some efforts to cut back the vegetation, it is still at risk, and as of August 2018 was classified as being at 'high' risk and in 'poor' condition.

== See also ==
- List of bridges in Scotland
