= Mill of Towie =

Historic mill in Moray, Scotland

Coordinates: 57°30′41″N 2°59′27″W

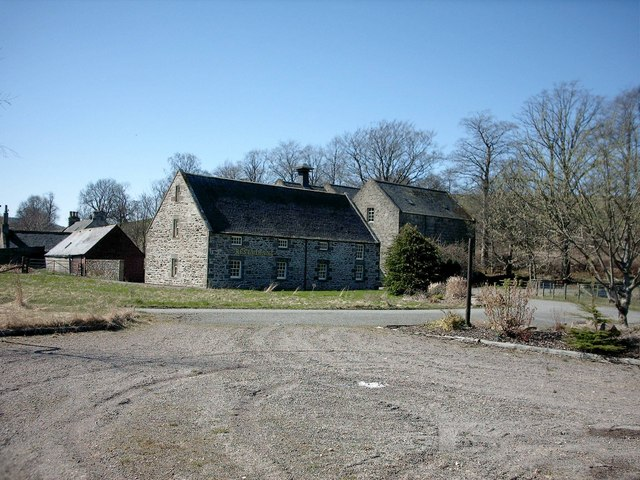
- The Mill of Towie, in the background. The chimney of the kiln can be seen rising above the outbuilding in the foreground.
- Interactive map of the Mill of Towie area

General information
- Type: Watermill and kiln
- Location: Near Keith, Moray, Scotland

Technical details
- Material: Rubble

Design and construction
- Designations: Category A listed building

The Mill of Towie is a nineteenth-century mill building, with an attached kiln, situated close the River Isla, approximately 2 miles (3.2 km) south of Keith, Moray in Moray.

The mill is a rubble-built rectangular building, three bays long by two wide, with a kiln projecting at its east end to form an L-shape. The main building is of two storeys, with loft space above, and was probably built in the early nineteenth-century having been built on the site of an earlier mill. There is a wheel house at its west end, protecting a wood- and iron-built breastshot paddle wheel. 1 metre (3.3 ft) in breadth and 4.3 metres (14 ft) in diameter, with eight spokes, it was built by Barry, Henry and Cook of Aberdeen. The mill's machinery, including the millstones and hoists powered by the wheel, remains operational, and the waterwheel has been described by John R. Hume as being in "excellent condition".

The mill underwent restoration in 1987–1988, and was designated a Category A listed building in 1988.

The Scottish country dance, The Mill of Towie, is named for the building.

NOTE placed 8th May 2022. Towie Mill is officially listed as the birthplace of James Milne 1629 d.1712 at the same location. His father was Thomas 'Tacksman of Towie Mills' 1599 - 1653. James had a son John who became 'Portioner of Urquart' 1659 - 1709. Along with James wife Margaret, they all lived at the Mill Of Towie. The records above state that the mill was erected C 1820, but there appears to have been a mill there from the 16th century or earlier.
