= Craigneach Castle =

Coordinates: 57.4663°N 3.2716°W

Craigneach Castle was a tower house, about 1 mile (1.6 km) east of Carron, Strathspey, Moray, Scotland, and 3 miles (4.8 km) west of Charlestown of Aberlour, north of the River Spey.

== History ==
The property may be the “Place of Elchies” plundered in 1645 by the Covenanters, although little about it is certain.

== Structure ==
Craigneath Castle was an L-plan castle, on a spur, in a commanding position. The building was of about 4.5 metres (15 ft) internal width. There was a dry-stone enclosure wall.

There are now no remains.

== See also ==
- Castles in Great Britain and Ireland
- List of castles in Scotland
