= Letterfourie House =

Coordinates: 57°38′49.92″N 2°55′45.19″W

- Interactive map of the Letterfourie House area

General information
- Architectural style: Georgian
- Location: Parish of Rathven, Moray, Scotland
- Construction started: 1772
- Completed: 1773; 253 years ago

Design and construction
- Architect: Robert Adam
- Designations: Category A listed building

Letterfourie House is a Georgian house inMoray, built by Robert Adam and completed in 1773. Its main block has three main storeys, with a raised cellar that opens onto the shaped water gardens on its south side. It was designated a Category A listed building in 1972.

== Description ==
Letterfourie House, one of the largest Georgian houses in Moray, lies above the Burn of Buckie, about a mile east of Drybridge in the parish of Rathven. The building consists of a central block built of pink pinned tooled granite, with pavilion wings of harl pointed rubble connected to the main house by three-bay linking blocks, all set out at right angles in a U-plan.

=== North Elevation ===
The north side of the main block presents as a three-bay, three storey building, the main entrance having a Corinthian columned porch, approached by a shallow flight of stairs, necessitated by the raised basement. The principal windows have architraves and blind balustraded aprons.

=== South Elevation ===
The south side of the house faces onto the gardens. From this side, the basement appears to the south of the house as a lower ground floor level, and so from the south each element of the house presents four storeys, with a central entrance to the basement level, with decorative fanlight, leading giving access to the gardens. The upper three storeys have five bays, and the blocked central window on the upper floor has a dated keystone. The basement chapel has two large, round headed windows, with intersecting astragals at their heads.

=== Interior ===
The interior design has been described as excellent. The principal rooms are lined with Spanish mahogany, which the Gordon brothers had sent back from Madeira where they had made their fortune in the wine trade.

The main north entrance leads into and east–west aligned entrance hall, with a cantilevered staircase that gives access to the upper floors. The dining room, looking onto the garden, is lined with mahogany, and features a fireplace with white a marble chimney piece and an unusual steel basket grate by James Fraser of Banff, which has a curved, decorated front which can be retracted to avoid soiling from overheating. Fine chimney pieces and fireplaces can also be found in the library, and in the first floor drawing room which also features original hand-painted wallpaper and fine, early- to mid-nineteenth century plasterwork. The former chapel, which no longer has any of its original fittings, has a groined, vaulted ceiling, and is flanked by engaged, fluted pilasters.

=== Gardens ===
There is a shaped water garden to the south side of the house. Installed in the early to mid-nineteenth Century, it has two round pools linked by a narrow canal. Each pool features a fountain, with square plinths and wide, scalloped bowls. There is also a large walled garden approximately 450 metres from the house, with a former garden room and orangery.

=== Craigmin Bridge ===
Within the grounds of the house, Craigmin Bridge carries what was once the main carriageway leading to the house over the Burn of Letterfourie. Probably designed by Adam at the same time as the house, its significance is recognised in its individual Category A listing.

== History ==
Letterfourie House was built as a home for two brothers from the Gordon family to retire to upon their return to Scotland. James Gordon was a wine trader who had established himself in Madeira, and Alexander had been a Jacobite who had been forced to flee Scotland for a time following the Battle of Culloden. They commissioned Robert Adam to build the house; work started in 1772, and it was completed in 1773. It was the first house Adam built in Scotland after returning from his Grand Tour, and the Sir John Soane’s Museum holds his original designs for it.

The Gordon brothers were staunchly Roman Catholic, and the house was built at a time when Catholics were not permitted to worship publicly, so the house was built to include a private chapel and accommodation for a priest.

In 1778 Alexander Gordon married Helen, daughter of Alexander Russell of Montcoffer, and their eldest son inherited the estate. He assumed baronetcy of Gordon of Gordonstoun, which had been dormant.

The reel The House of Letterfourie, also known as 'Lasses look behind you', by William Marshall of Fochabers, is named for the house.

The house was designated as a Category A listed building in 1972.
