= Greyfriars Sisters of Mercy Convent in Elgin =

Greyfriars Sisters of Mercy Convent
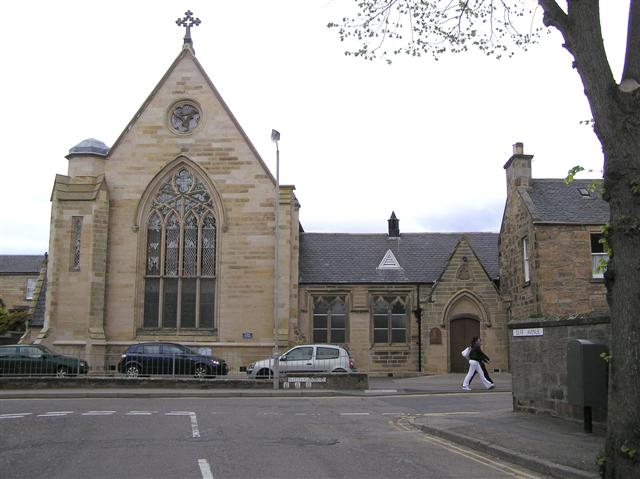
- St. Sylvester Church and the monastery, Elgin
- Interactive map of Greyfriars Sisters of Mercy Convent

Monastery information
- Other name: Mercy Convent
- Order: Franciscans, later Sisters of Mercy
- Established: 1479, 1898
- Disestablished: 1559
- Dedication: Saint Sylvester
- Diocese: Aberdeen

People
- Founder: Alexander II of Scotland

Site
- Location: Elgin, Moray

Greyfriars Sisters of Mercy Convent in Elgin, Moray is one of the few Catholic monasteries, founded in Scotland after the Reformation in 1560.

== History ==
On the site of the current convent, a Franciscan monastery was founded in 1479 on the site of an older Franciscan monastery, founded by Bishop John Innes of Innes. The Order of Friars Minor Conventual (Greyfriars) was introduced in Scotland by king Alexander II in the 13th century, and settled in Elgin in the 15th century. This Franciscan monastery was secularized in 1559 during the Scottish Reformation.

In the 16th century, the buildings of the former monastery housed a court and the Chamber of Commerce. In 1648 the monastery was converted into a residence of the King family and remained as such for 120 years. At that time, the abbey church became the episcopal church. In 1818 this residence was bought by the Stewart family.

The Sisters of Mercy bought the ruined buildings of the monastery and the St. Sylvester Church in 1891, which were then restored from 1896 to 1908, thanks to the financial support of John Crichton-Stuart, 3rd Marquis of Bute and his son Colum Crichton-Stuart, according to a project made by the architect John Kinross. On 4 October 1898 in the church of the monastery the first Catholic Mass since the Reformation was celebrated. Until the early 2000s, the Sisters of Mercy ran a kindergarten and a primary school. The monastery is now occupied by the Dominican Sisters of St. Cecilia.

== See also ==
- Catholic Church in Scotland
- List of monastic houses in Scotland
