= Tor Castle, Moray =

Scottish castle

Tor Castle
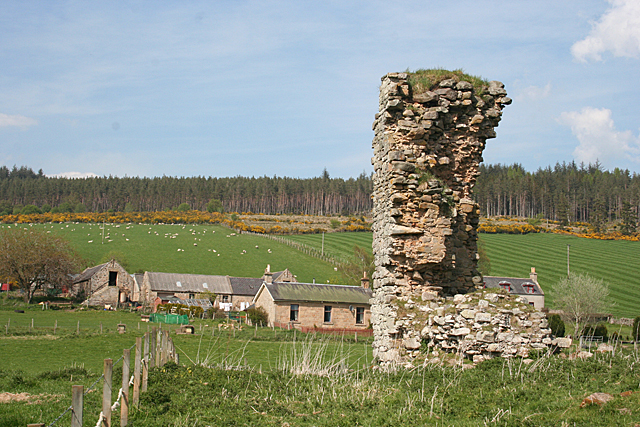

Site information
- Owner: Cummings
- Condition: ruined

Location
- Coordinates: 57.55860°N 3.46354°W

Tor Castle was a keep built about 8 miles (13 km) south and west of Elgin, Moray, Scotland. The alternative name is Castle of Dallas.

== History ==
Coventry says the castle dates from about 1400, and belonged to the Cummings or Comyns. But Trove says authorisation of the castle was not until 1419, and erection not until about 1450. Robert Cochrane was the constructor. Up to about 1650 it was periodically expanded, but it was abandoned at that time.

== Structure ==
Traces of the castle remain: only a 30 feet (9.1 m) high fragment of the north west wall. There was a tower at the south east angle.

== See also ==
- Castles in Great Britain and Ireland
- List of castles in Scotland
