= Inveravon, Moray =

Parish in Moray, Scotland

Coordinates: 57°18′32″N 3°25′4″W

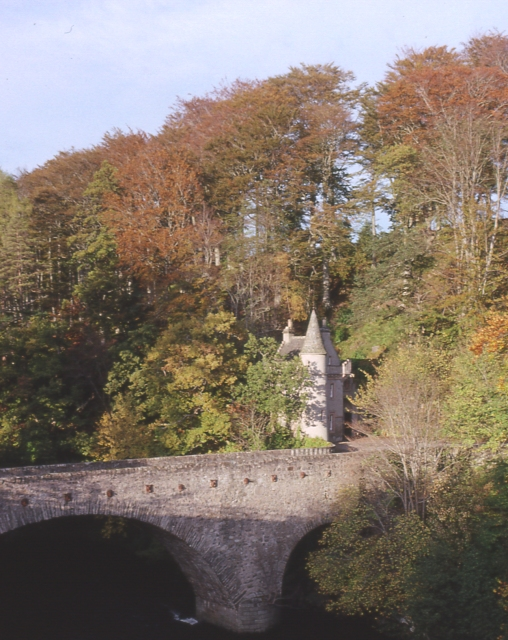
Old Bridge of Avon, Ballindalloch

Inveravon is a parish in the council area of Moray, Scotland. It lies in the lower reaches of the River Avon and includes the settlement of Ballindalloch.

== Geography ==
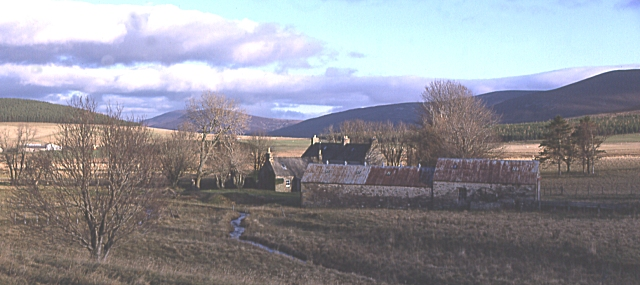
looking down Glenlivet from Scalan

This thinly populated parish stretches from the confluence of the Avon (pronounced A'an) with the River Spey south to the parish of Kirkmichael. The total area of the parish is now 198.8 km^{2} (77 sq mi) the boundaries having been modified following the publication of the Local Government (Scotland) Act 1889. The current boundaries encompass Ballindalloch and Marypark in Speyside, a small area of land on the north bank of the Spey adjacent to those settlements, a part of lower Stratha'an and the whole of Glenlivet.

== Demography ==
In 1798 the parish of Inveravon was populated by 1,394 members of the Church of Scotland and 850 Roman Catholics (described as "the only dissenters" there) making the total population 2,244. In 2011 the figure was 913 and by 2022 it had declined further to 738.

== History ==
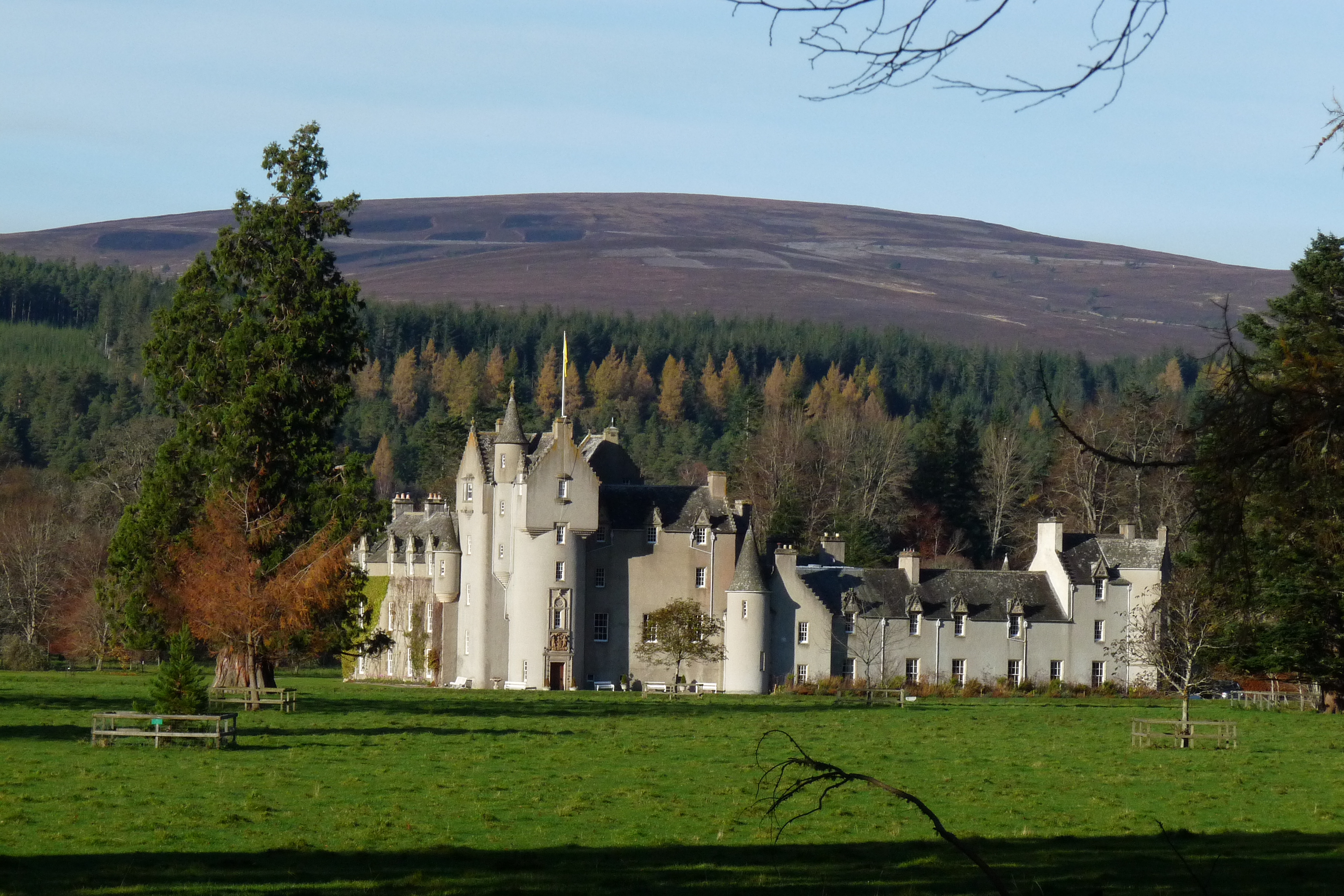
Ballindalloch Castle

Stratha'an was a provincial lordship first recorded between 1194 and 1198 that was coextensive with the parishes of Kirkmichael and Inveravon. The parish was part of the historic county of Banffshire until it was abolished in 1974.

Drumin Castle at the foot of Glenlivet may have been erected by the Wolf of Badenoch. Two walls remain to a height of four storeys but although it was an impressive fortification it's habitable phase was fairly short-lived. After it was sold to the 3rd Earl of Huntly it became derelict in the sixteenth century.

The remains of a chapel, well and burial ground exist on the west bank of the A'n just south of the junction with Glenlivet. The chapel measures about 11.5m by 4m. Although there are no surviving traces of any graves the presence of several headstones was recorded in the late 18th century.

In the early modern period Ballindalloch Castle became the family home of the Macpherson-Grant family and has remained in their hands for nearly five centuries. In the late eighteenth century the "exterior of the building and the artificial embellishment of the natural beauties, bespeak it the residence of opulence united with the most correct taste". The author of the Inveravon section of the Old Statistical Account added that "by the history of Scotland in all ages, it is certain that there has been no period in which the people, high or low, of every rank, led their lives in more secure or more comfortable circumstances."

Scalan in Glenlivet was a Scottish Catholic seminary and one of the few places in Scotland where young men were trained to be Catholic priests during the anti-Catholic persecutions of the 18th century. The cottage is now a museum.

At the head of Strath Avon near Ballindalloch is the Old Bridge of Avon which was opened in 1800 and is now only used for pedestrian traffic. A plaque marks the highest point reached by the river during the Muckle Spate of 1829, which raised the water level by 7m. The main A95 road now crosses the river via a concrete bridge constructed in the late 20th century situated just 50 m to the southwest.

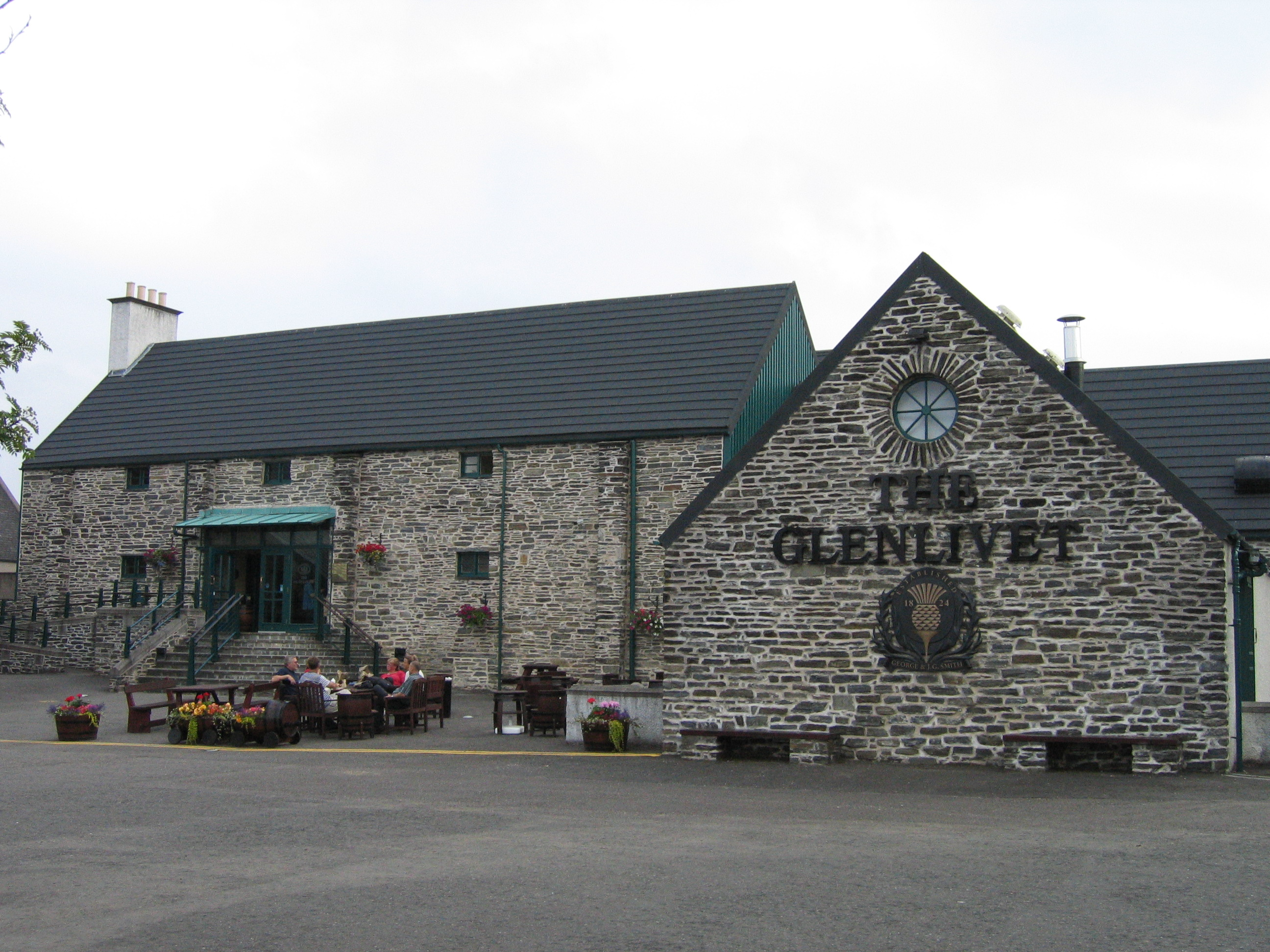
The Glenlivet distillery

Ballindalloch railway station opened in 1863 and was part of the Strathspey Railway (GNoSR) until its closure in 1965. The station building was used as a hostel for walkers and cyclists navigating the Speyside Way that runs along the line of the dismantled railway but is now a private house.

== Economy ==
Tourism, agriculture, forestry and whisky distilling dominate the local economy.

Glenlivet hosts the Tamnavulin distillery. Further downstream on the west bank of the river is The Glenlivet distillery owned by the Chivas Brothers that sells more than a million cases per annum. Other distilleries in the parish include Glenfarclas, Cragganmore, Tormore, and Ballindalloch, the last of which operates from the castle's estate farm.

== See also ==
- List of listed buildings in Inveravon, Moray
- List of civil parishes in Scotland
