= Elgin Castle =

12th-century Scottish castle

Coordinates: 57.6484°N 3.3224°W

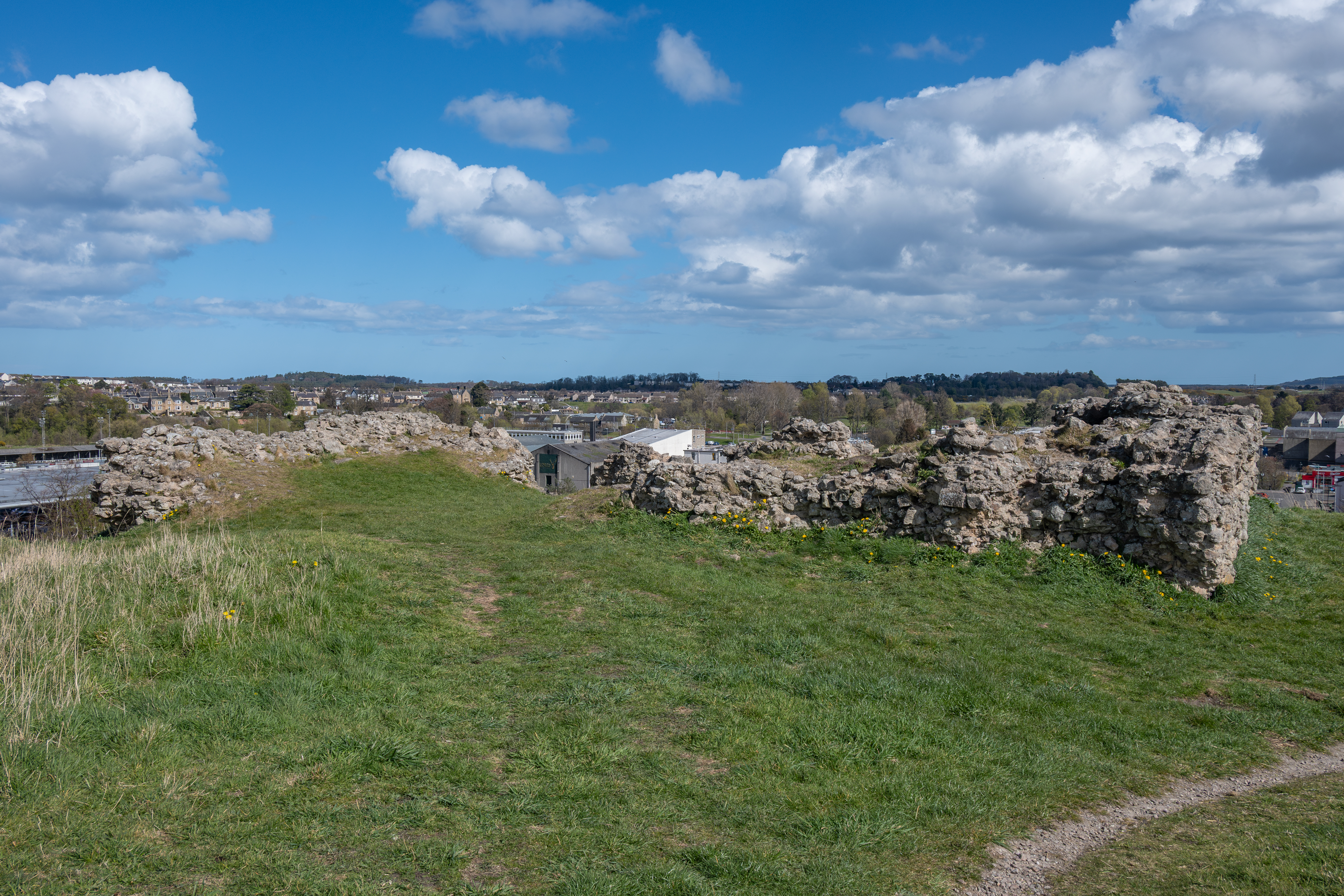
Ruins of Elgin Castle

Elgin Castle was a 12th-century castle built near Elgin, Moray, Scotland.

Elgin was created a royal burgh by King David I of Scotland in 1136. The castle, once a royal castle, was built as a motte and bailey castle. King Edward I of England captured the castle and stayed at the castle during 1296. When the king returned in 1303, he was unable to stay in the castle due to the damage it had sustained in the fighting in the years since his last visit. It was destroyed by King Robert I of Scotland in 1308, after two previous unsuccessful attempts to capture the castle. The castle was never rebuilt and fell into ruins.

It is now a designated scheduled monument.

== See also ==
- Scheduled monuments in Moray
