= Deskford Tower =

14th-century tower house in Scotland

Coordinates: 57.6418°N 2.8242°W

Tower of Deskford was a 14th-century tower house, about 3.5 miles (5.6 km) south of Cullen, Moray, Scotland at Deskford, west of the burn. The tower and its associated buildings are a scheduled monument.

It may be known alternatively as Deskford Castle or Kirkton of Deskford.

== History ==
The Sinclairs of Findlater and Deskford built the castle in the late 14th century, but it passed to the Ogilvies, by marriage after the death of Sir John Sinclair at the Battle of Harlaw. The Ogilvies later left the castle for Cullen House.

The precise relationship and history between the tower and the remains of the nearby Church of St John in Deskford is unknown. The chapel of St John is recorded as having been rebuilt in 1541 and it was described as a church four years later. When a new parish church was built in 1872, the original building was unroofed and its walls were consolidated with cement. The tower appears to have been attached to the north wall of the church at one time, but the connection has been severed, probably when the church was unroofed.

== Structure ==
In the 1790s the tower stood three storeys tall with a garret, but little remains apart from outhouses. Most was demolished in the 1830s. All that remains of the tower proper are two partial walls of coursed rubble, 1.4 metres (4 ft 7 in) thick and 2.3 metres (7 ft 7 in) high, the remnants of the barrel vaulting of a basement and a newel stair in the south-west corner. In the late 18th century, there was evidence suggesting that the castle had a courtyard.

== See also ==
- Castles in Great Britain and Ireland
- List of castles in Scotland
