= Inverugie Castle, Moray =

14th-century castle in Moray, Scotland

Inverugie Castle

Location
- Coordinates: 57.6987260°N 3.4238680°W

Site history
- Built: 14th century

Inverugie Castle was a castle, in the parish of Duffus, about 5.5 miles (8.9 km) north-west of Elgin, Moray, Scotland, and 1.0 mile (1.6 km) south of Hopeman.

== History ==
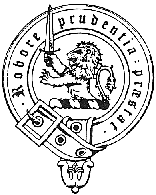
Young crest

The castle belonged to the Young family. A later house at the site was constructed by the Mortimer family. Around 1824 the stones of the castle of Inverugie were cleared at the time of the lease of the Clashach Quarries.

== Structure ==
No traces of the castle remain. The site was on a rocky promontory and was later damaged by trenches from the Second World War.

== See also ==
- Castles in Great Britain and Ireland
- List of castles in Scotland
