= Dunphail Castle =

Scottish castle

Location
- Coordinates: 57°30′44″N 3°39′32″W

Site history
- Built: 14th century

Dunphail Castle is a ruined 14th-century tower house, about 6.5 miles (10.5 km) south of Forres, Moray, Scotland, west of nearby Dunphail House, and east of the River Divie.

== History ==
The castle was in existence before 1314. The Comyns owned Dunphail Castle, and the Regent Moray besieged them there in 1330, after their flight from Darnaway Castle. Moray beheaded five of the garrison, whom he had captured when they had been foraging. He had the heads flung over the walls, supposedly saying, “Here’s beef for your bannocks”. (Five skull-less bodies were discovered buried near the castle, in the 18th century.) The remnant of the garrison were killed by the Regent's troops when attempting to escape.

The Dunbars, came into ownership of Dunphail and may have occupied this castle afterwards. Dunphail House was, however, built for the Cummings.

== Structure ==
The castle was built on Castle Hill, towards the south. Only a vaulted basement remains.

== See also ==
- Castles in Great Britain and Ireland
- List of castles in Scotland
