= Findochty Castle =

Coordinates: 57.6929°N 2.9150°W

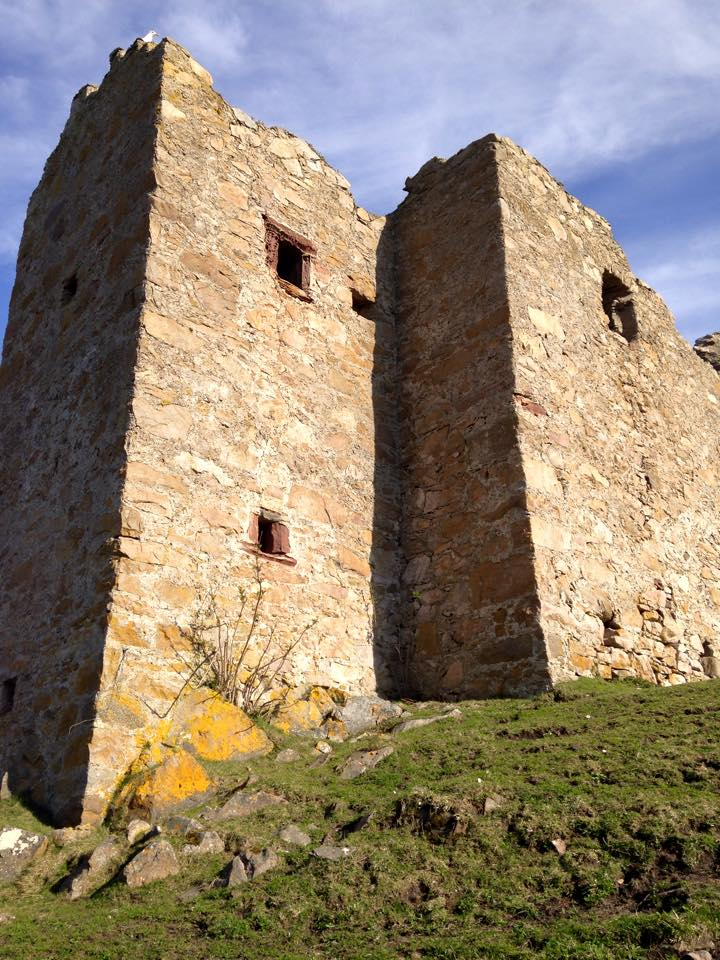
Findochty Castle

Findochty Castle is a ruined 16th century L-plan tower house, near Findochty, Moray, Scotland, about 2.5 miles (4.0 km) north-east of Buckie, and about 0.25 miles (0.4 km) from the sea to the north.

The castle stands on a rock at the end of a drained loch.

== History ==
The castle was built by the Gordons, but was acquired by the Ogilvies, and, in 1568, by the Ord family, who subsequently developed Findochty village as a fishing port.

The castle was a ruin in 1794. Some repairs were done to the castle remains in the 1880s.

== Structure ==
It appears that the castle comprised an oblong block, 24.25 feet (7.4 m) broad (but of unknown length), and a small oblong tower, about 16.5 feet (5.0 m) by 10.5 feet (3.2 m) to the west, attach to the north front.

The main building has been destroyed, apart from part of the north wall, and of the west wing. The tower and the west wing, once the kitchen, remain up to about 26.2 feet (8.0 m).

There was a vaulted basement, while the hall was on the first floor.

The castle is constructed of harl-pointed rubble, with roughly tooled dressings. There is a narrow door in the south front, with a relieving arch.

The castle is a scheduled monument.
