= Hempriggs Castle =

15th-century castle near Forres, Moray, Scotland

Location
- Coordinates: 57.6576640°N 3.5037291°W

Site history
- Built: 16th century

Clan member crest badge - Clan Dunbar

Hempriggs Castle was a 15th-century castle, about 5.0 miles (8 km) north-east of Forres, Moray, Scotland, and about 3.5 miles (6 km) south of Burghead. The castle belonged to the Dunbars, who also owned property in Caithness. It is thought that the castle was built during the reign of James II of Scotland. It was demolished around 1830, the stones being used in constructing the farmsteading. No trace of the castle remains.

== See also ==
- Castles in Great Britain and Ireland
- List of castles in Scotland
