= Aikenway Castle =

- Rothes, Moray in Scotland
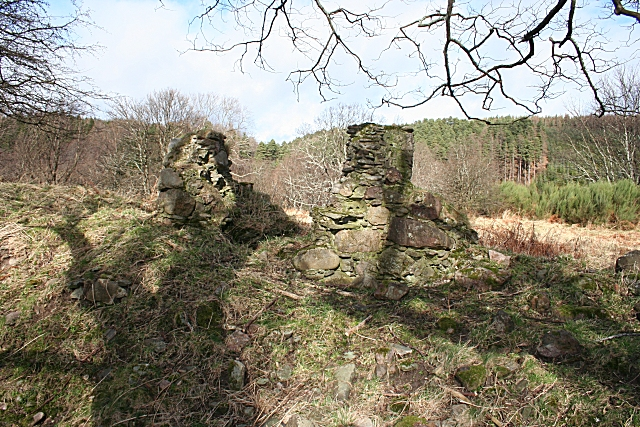
- Surviving stonework at Aikenway Castle

Site information
- Type: Medieval castle
- Open to the public: yes
- Condition: Ruinous

Location
- Location of Aikenway Castle
- Coordinates: 57.541221°N 3.1854387°W

Aikenway Castle was a castle about 5 miles (8.0 km) northeast of Rothes, Moray, Scotland, on the southern bank of the River Spey.

Little remains of the ruinous castle.

== Description ==
The stone castle was built on a steep promontory on a bend in the River Spey. Its strategic location made it naturally defended on three sides. The only approach to the castle was via a narrow ridge to the south. There is evidence that the ridge was mined to make it steeper. The castle is said to have been known for its interior oak panelling.

== History ==
The history of the castle is not known. Traces of the castle, including a west turret survived until 1870. A brother of Earl Leslie of Rothes is said to have occupied it.

The last occupants recorded were Margaret and Christian Leslie, in 1729.
