= Old Spey Bridge, Fochabers =

Bridge in Moray, Scotland

Old Spey Bridge
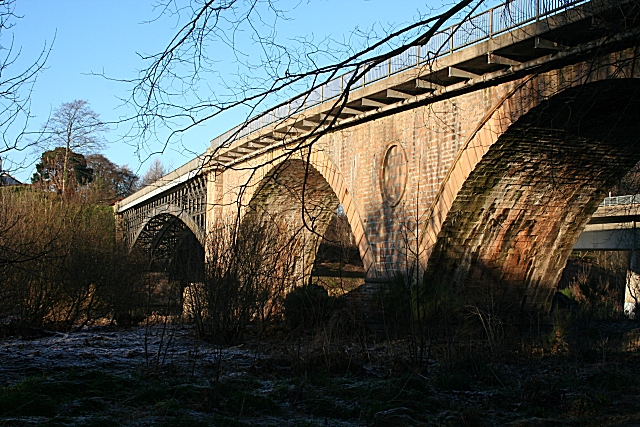
- The Old Spey Bridge, viewed from the east bank of the Spey
- Coordinates: 57.62023°N 3.10659°W
- Carries: Pedestrians (formerly road traffic)
- Crosses: River Spey

Characteristics
- Material: Cast iron, masonry

History
- Designer: George Burn, Archibald Simpson
- Opened: 1806
- Rebuilt: 1832, 1853

Listed Building – Category A
- Official name: (Old) Spey Bridge
- Designated: 25 January 1971
- Reference no.: LB15645

Location
- Interactive map of Old Spey Bridge

The Old Spey Bridge is a footbridge on the outskirts of Fochabers in Moray, Scotland, which formerly carried the main road between Inverness and Aberdeen over the River Spey. Originally built between 1801 and 1806 by George Burn, it was partially destroyed in the Muckle Spate of 1829, with two of its arches being washed away. Archibald Simpson repaired the bridge in 1831 with a single timber span, which was reconstructed in cast iron in 1853. The bridge is designated a Category A listed building.

== Description ==
The Old Spey Bridge crosses the River Spey at Fochabers, between the parishes of Bellie and Speymouth. The present structure has three spans, all supported by segmental arches. The two arches at the eastern end, surviving from when the bridge was built, are of ashlar, with large oculi in the rubble-built spandrels between them, and with tooled ashlar cutwaters. The western arch, built to replace two arches that were destroyed in a flood, is of cast iron, supported by three ribs, with lattice grids connecting supporting the roadway to the arch, and is known as the longest cast iron span of its kind in Scotland. A modern metal balustrade runs along the length of the bridge.

The bridge is no longer open to road traffic, but is accessible to pedestrians.

== History ==
Records show that a ferry, known as the boat of bog, crossed the Spey at or around this location since at least the mid-thirteenth century. The first bridge at the location, carrying the road from Aberdeen to Inverness, was designed and built by George Burn, working with his brother James, between 1801 and 1806; Thomas Telford had also submitted a design for the structure, but this was rejected.

The bridge lost its two western arches in a major flooding event, known as the Muckle Spate, in 1829, which saw most of the bridges in Moray washed away. The 5th Duke of Gordon commissioned Archibald Simpson to repair the structure between 1831 and 1832; this was done with single span supported by a timber arch. In 1853 the timber arch was reconstructed in cast iron by James Hoby & Co.

A road deck was built by James Abernethy & Co in 1912. The carriage was widened in the 1960s, when it carried the A96 between Aberdeen and Inverness, but was bypassed around 1970 by a new steel and concrete bridge a short distance downstream, and retained as a footbridge.

The bridge was designated a Category B listed building in 1971; it was upgraded to Category A in 1988.

== See also ==
- List of bridges in Scotland
