= Old Church of St John =

Ruined church in Moray, Scotland

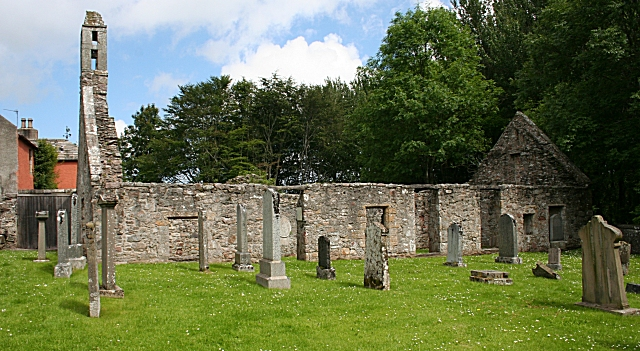
- The church viewed from the south
- Old Church of St John
- 57°38′32″N 3°05′49″W
- Location: Kirktown of Deskford
- Country: Scotland
- Denomination: Church of Scotland

History
- Founded: Partially rebuilt 1541

Architecture
- Functional status: Unused since 1872
- Heritage designation: Scheduled monument (remains of church and tower), Category A listed building (burial grounds)
- Designated: 1934, 1972

The Old Church of St John is a ruined church, incorporating a finely carved sacrament house and situated within a historic burial ground in Kirktown of Deskford in Moray, Scotland. The church, along with the remains of the Tower of Deskford which was formerly attached to it, is a scheduled monument; the burial grounds and enclosing wall, excluding the other structures, are designated as a Category A listed building.

== History ==
St John's church was first mentioned in documents from 1541, which record its reconstruction, and which describe is as a chapel, probably built for the Ogilvy family. It is first described as a church in 1545, and the sacrament house was added in 1551. Situated within the parish of Fordyce, the church was owned by the canons of Aberdeen Cathedral. It remained in use until 1872, when a new parish church was built. The old kirk, now redundant, had its roof removed, its walls consolidated with cement, and it was allowed to fall into disrepair.

The buildings were designated a scheduled monument in 1934; the burial grounds were designated a Category A listed building in 1972.

== Description ==
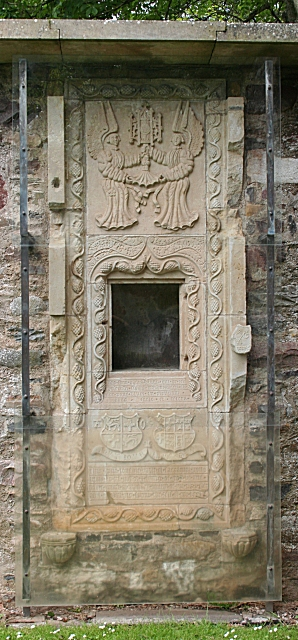
The sacrament house

The remains of the church survive as a long, narrow and roofless rectangular structure, with openings where the doorways would originally have been. It is roughly 20 metres long, and 8 metres wide, with walls around a metre in thickness. The walls survive to their full height, but the level of the ground has been raised by between 0.6 - 0.9 metres, probably around 1872 when the roof was removed.

Little remains of the Tower of Deskford. Originally attached to north wall of the church, in the 1790s the tower was three stories high; all that remains today is the vaulted ground floor, and the part that abutted the church has been removed, also probably when the roof was removed.

The 1551 sacrament house, described as 'gorgeous' by Charles McKean and 'particularly fine' by Richard Fawcett, is seen as the most significant surviving feature of the church. Roughly 2.5 metres high and 1 metre wide, it features fine vine-scrolling and carvings, as well as a number of inscriptions in Latin which reference the Ogilvy family (who went on to become the Earls of Seafield), and the Gordons.

The burial grounds contain a number of 17th and 18th Century memorials, including that of Walter Ogilvy, a former minister of the parish, who died in 1658. The grounds are enclosed by a coped rubble wall, and accessed from the north via a pair of simple cast iron spear-head gates, flanked by squared ashlar piers.
