= Rafford =

Coordinates: 57°35′14″N 3°34′28″W

Rafford: Scottish Gaelic: Ràthard
- Location within Moray
- OS grid reference: NJ059564
- Council area: Moray
- Lieutenancy area: Moray
- Country: Scotland
- Sovereign state: United Kingdom
- Post town: FORRES
- Postcode district: IV36
- Dialling code: 01309
- Police: Scotland
- Fire: Scottish
- Ambulance: Scottish
- UK Parliament: Moray
- Scottish Parliament: Moray

Rafford (Scottish Gaelic: Ràthard) is a village in Moray, Scotland. It is approximately 2.5 miles (4 km) southeast of the town of Forres, and 5.5 miles (9 km) northwest of the village of Dallas.

The parish church was designed by James Gillespie Graham in 1826.

Rafford Village Hall was originally a church, built in 1889, but was bought by the community in 1950 for use as a hall. An earlier church had been built in 1843 and this sat in front of the hall, where the car park is now.

The hall has a large function room which is used for a variety of activities such as WRI, Scottish Country Dancers, exercise classes, ceilidhs, plays, and concerts.

The road B9010 runs through the village, initially by the church in what is known as "Lower Rafford" and then through and into "Upper Rafford", many of the houses are set off of this road and although comparatively small in population, the village is deceptive because of its width.
