= Ballindalloch Railway Bridge =

19th century railway bridge in Moray, Scotland

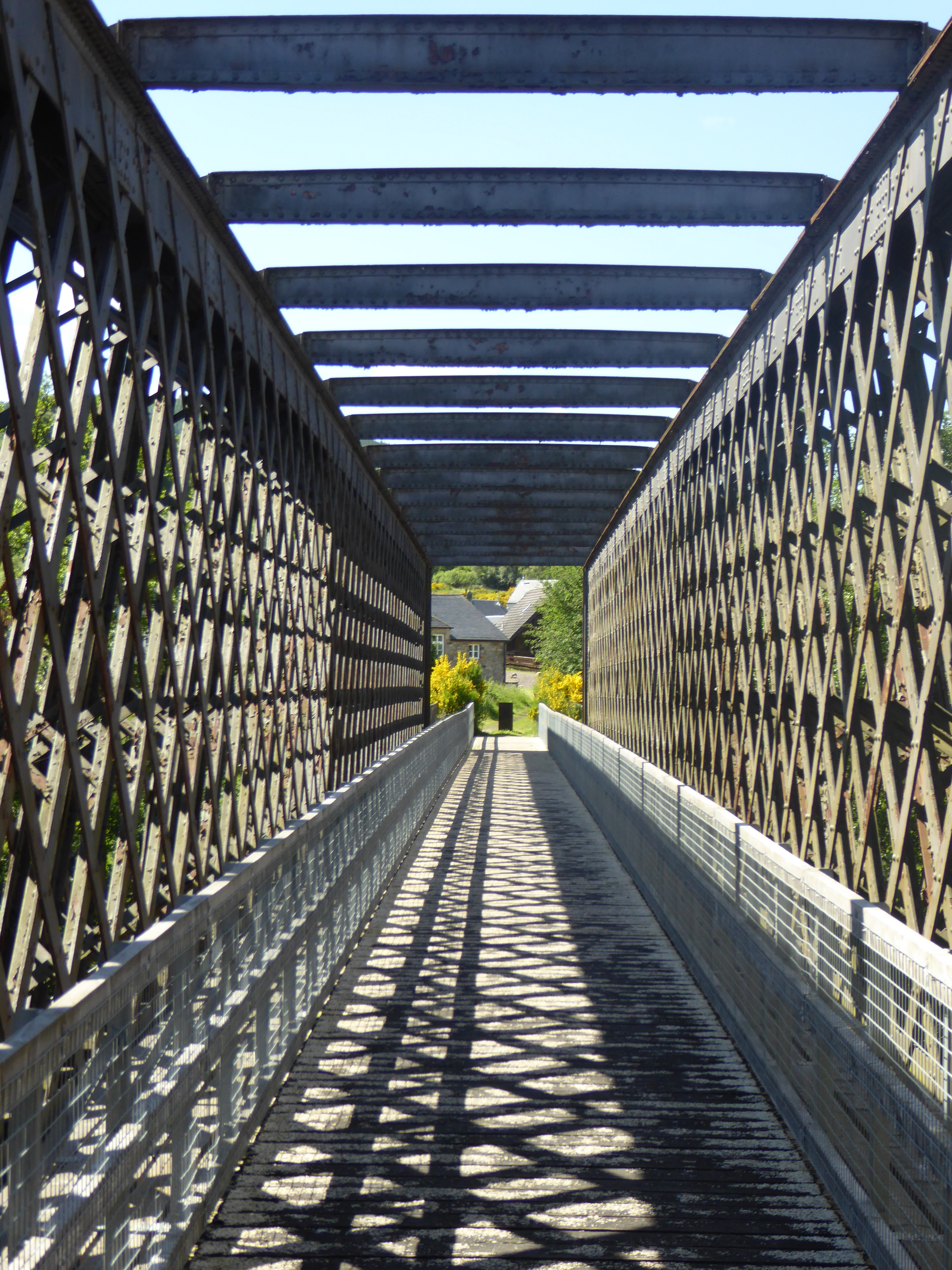
- The view along the bridge
- Coordinates: 57°24′50″N 3°23′08″W
- Carries: Pedestrians, cyclists (formerly railway)
- Crosses: River Spey

Characteristics
- Material: Wrought iron
- Longest span: 195 feet (59 m)

History
- Designer: Alexander Gibb
- Opened: 1863

Listed Building – Category A
- Official name: Ballindalloch, Former Railway Bridge Over River Spey
- Designated: 9 November 1987
- Reference no.: LB8466

Location
- Interactive map of Ballindalloch Railway Bridge

The Ballindalloch Railway Bridge is a former railway bridge on the crossing the River Spey at Ballindalloch in Moray, Scotland. Built in 1863 as a part of the Strathspey Railway, it was in use until the line was closed in 1968. It is now designated as a Category A listed building, and carries pedestrians and cyclists over the river as a part of the Speyside Way.

== Description ==
The Ballindalloch Railway Bridge crosses the Spey at Ballindaloch, linking the parishes of Inveravon in Banffshire and Knockando in Moray. It is a wrought iron lattice girder bridge, with a single-span of 195 feet (59 metres), supported by rubble abutments, and with plate girder spans at either end giving an overall length of around 250 feet (75 metres).

== History ==
The Ballindalloch Railway Bridge was constructed in 1863 for the Strathspey Railway. It was designed by Alexander Gibb, an engineer for the Great North of Scotland Railway, and the ironwork was fabricated by G. MacFarlane of Dundee. The Strathspey Railway was absorbed into the Great North of Scotland Railway in 1866, and the bridge was in regular use on the line, carrying passengers and large volumes of whisky from the nearby distilleries, until it was closed to regular passenger traffic in 1965, and closed completely in 1968. The bridge was designated a Category A listed building in 1987, and was a scheduled monument until 2006. It is open to pedestrians and cyclists, forming a part of the Speyside Way.

== See also ==
- List of bridges in Scotland
