= Innes baronets of Balvenie (1628) =

Escutcheon of the Innes baronets of Balvenie

The Innes baronetcy, of Balvenie in the County of Banff, was created in the Baronetage of Nova Scotia on 15 January 1628 for Robert Innes, with remainder to heirs male whatsoever.

The line of the 1st Baronet failed on the death of the 8th Baronet in 1817. The late Baronet was succeeded by his distant relative, the 9th Baronet, heir male of John Innes, great-great-uncle of the 1st Baronet. The 12th Baronet, a sheep farmer and magistrate in New Zealand, served as Vice-Lord-Lieutenant of Banffshire.

== Innes baronets, of Balvenie (1628) ==
- Sir Robert Innes, 1st Baronet (died c.1650)
- Sir Walter Innes, 2nd Baronet (died c.1670)
- Sir Robert Innes, 3rd Baronet (died c.1680)
- Sir George Innes, 4th Baronet (died c.1690)
- Sir James Innes, 5th Baronet (died 1722)
- Sir Robert Innes, 6th Baronet (c.1703–1758)
- Sir Charles Innes, 7th Baronet (c.1704–1768)
- Sir William Innes, 8th Baronet (died 1817)
- Sir John Innes, 9th Baronet (1757–1829), assumed the baronetcy without formalities
- Sir John Innes, 10th Baronet (1801–1838)
- Sir James Milne Innes, 11th Baronet (1808–1878)
- Sir John Innes, 12th Baronet (1840–1912)
- Sir James Innes, 13th Baronet (1846–1919)
- Sir James Bourchier Innes, 14th Baronet (1883–1950)
- Sir Walter James Innes, 15th Baronet (1903–1978)
- Sir (Ronald Gordon) Berowald Innes, 16th Baronet (1907–1988)
- Sir Peter Alexander Berowald Innes, 17th Baronet (born 1937)

The heir apparent is the present holder's eldest son Alexander Guy Berowald Innes (born 1960).

== Extended family ==
Victoria Cross recipient James John McLeod Innes was also a member of this family.
