= Coxton Tower =

16th-century tower house in Scotland

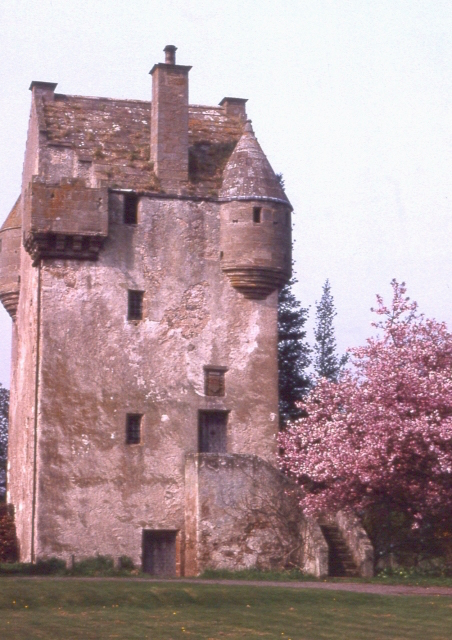
- The tower viewed from the south, May 1990

- Location of the tower in Scotland
- 57°37′50″N 3°14′16″W
- Type: Tower house
- Location: Near Lhanbryde, Moray

History
- Built: 1590
- Built for: Alexander Innes

Scheduled monument
- Designated: 1920
- Delisted: 2018
- Reference no.: SM1228

Listed Building – Category A
- Designated: 1971
- Reference no.: LB15774

Coxton Tower is a late sixteenth-century tower house in Moray, Scotland. Heavily fortified, it was built around 1590, with substantive repairs in 1635 and 1645, but its design is reminiscent of much older buildings. It has not been occupied since around 1867 except to house Canadian soldiers during the Second World War, but was renovated in 2001 to help protect the fabric of the structure, which is designated a Category A listed building.

== Description ==
Coxton Tower is a relatively small, four-storey fortified tower house, about 1 kilometre (0.6 mi) south of Lhanbryde in Moray, Scotland. Approximately 7 metres (23 ft) square in plan, it is in an unusually good state of repair for an uninhabited building of its age. Although it was built around 1590, its style is old-fashioned for that date; Charles McKean has described it as "grossly antiquated", and Walker and Woodworth describe it as "remarkably antiquated", comparing it to rudimentary tower designs of the early fifteenth century.

=== Exterior ===
There is a simple chamfered doorway at ground level in the south wall, giving access to the sunken ground floor store room. The main entrance, also in the south wall, is on the first floor; this is currently reached via a stairway added around 1846, but would originally have been reached using a ladder. Above this entrance is an armorial panel, with the initials of Alexander Innes, who built the tower, and of Robert Innes of Invermarkie, his feudal superior. Also mentioned are Janet Reid, Alexander Innes's first wife, and Kate Gordon, his second. There would originally have been a courtyard and barmkin attached to the building, but no traces of these survive.

The tower's walls, which are up to 1.4 metres (4.6 ft) thick, are rubble-built and harled with ashlar detailing, and there are gun loops in the north, west, and east walls on the ground floor. Additional gun holes are to be found in the corbelled bartizans on the south-east and north-west corners, which have conical roofs, and on the open, crenellated bartizan on the south-west corner. No timber is used in the fabric of the building, and even the roof is made of stone; it is believed that this is a design element intended to help it withstand fire as well as external attack. The roof is steeply pitched, with stepped gables at the east and west ends; there are chimney stacks at the apex of each gable, and a tall chimney, largely rebuilt in the mid-nineteenth century, in the middle of the south wall.

=== Interior ===
Each storey of the tower is a single room, with a stone-vaulted ceiling. The orientation of the vaulting alternates between north–south and east–west on each storey, in a rare arrangement that helps to counteract the lateral thrust of the vaulting in the levels above and below each storey. The ground floor, which is somewhat below ground level, served as a store room, and provided protection for cattle when necessary; a hatch in the vaulted roof communicates with the hall above, and would have provided a means of passing goods between the store room and the living accommodation.

The first floor, which was protected from intruders by a surviving iron yett, served as a small hall. It features a fireplace that was installed around 1820, an aumbry and a window with a panel displaying the arms of Sir Alexander Innes and Mary Mackenzie, his second wife, believed to date from after 1647 (when Maria Gordon, his first wife, died). A staircase in the north-east corner, built into the thickness of the wall, leads to the upper floors. The second floor has two recessed windows, one in the western wall next to a square aumbry, and one in the southern wall which incorporates another gun loop. The third floor has a tall vaulted ceiling supporting the stone roof above it, and rectangular entrances to the bartizans, which each feature further gun loops.

== History ==
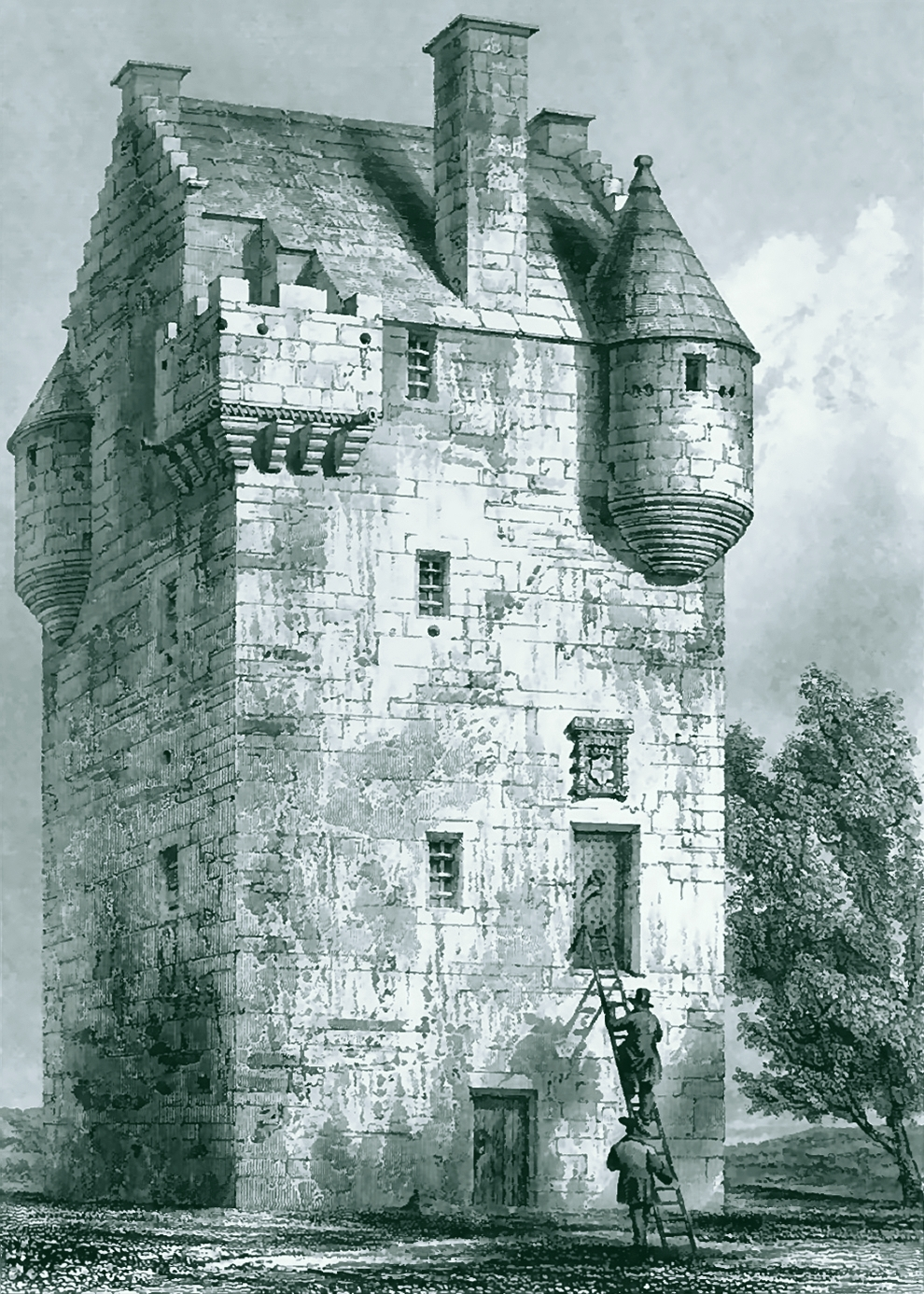
A 1901 engraving, depicting the tower before the addition of the external stair

In 1572, Alexander Innes was granted a royal licence to build a tower house on the site, but his initial tower was completely destroyed by fire in 1584. A new tower was built, which appears on a map by Timothy Pont from around 1590, and much of the surviving fabric of the building dates from that construction, although repairs were necessary after attacks in 1635 and 1645. Armorial panels found in the building refer to his grandson, Sir Alexander Innes, the second Baron of Innes, whose memorial can be found at the burial ground at Lhanbryde.

The tower and its estate were purchased by William Duff of Dipple in 1714, and were retained by his descendants, the Earls and Dukes of Fife, until 1910, when it was sold to the family of Malcolm Christie, its current owner. The tower has been uninhabited since around 1867 except to house Canadian soldiers during the Second World War.

Coxton Tower was designated a scheduled monument in 1920, and was subsequently recognised as a Category A listed building in 1971.

In 2001, LTM Group were engaged by the architects Law & Dunbar-Nasmith on behalf of the current owner to undertake restoration work on the fabric of the building. This involved work on the stone roof, and consolidation of the harling and lime washing.

Coxton Tower was removed from the scheduled monuments register in 2018, as this largely duplicated its listed building status.
