= Braco's Banking House =

Historic townhouse in Elgin, Scotland

Coordinates: 57°38′56″N 3°18′37″W

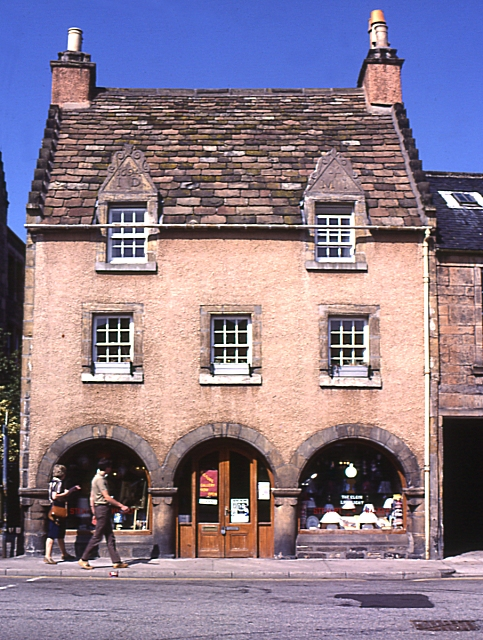
- Interactive map of the Braco's Banking House area

General information
- Location: Elgin, Scotland
- Completed: 1694; 332 years ago

Design and construction
- Designations: Category A listed building

Braco's Banking House is a three-storey town house in Elgin, Moray, Scotland. The home and business place of banker William Duff of Braco from 1703 to 1722, the house has borne his name ever since. It was designated a Category A listed building in 1970.

== Description ==
Braco's Banking House, at 7 High Street in Elgin, is a south-facing three-storey town house of three symmetrical bays, with crowstepped gables on each side, and fronted by an arcade of three round-headed arches on the ground floor. It has a harled exterior, with ashlar detailing. Each bay on the first floor has a small, twelve-pane sash window, and the two outer bays on the second floor each have a window, raised through the eaves of the roof, with carved stone pediments, the western one dated 1694 with initials I D and a thistle finial, the eastern one decorated with a star and a fleur-de-lys and initialled M I. The roof is of stone slabs, and there is a two-storey wing at the rear.

== History ==
Built in 1694, the house was owned by the Coxtons of Innes; initials above the second floor windows represent John Duncan and Margaret Innes. From 1703 to 1722 however, the house served as the home and place of business for William Duff of Braco and Dipple, for whom it is named. Duff and his brother Alexander enriched themselves by lending money to estate owners in a period when harvests were poor. Many landowners in Scotland had lost money on the Darien scheme, and when lenders defaulted on their loans, the brothers would take ownership of the properties that had been offered as security. In this way, Alexander acquired the Braco and Balvenie estates, and when Alexander's son committed suicide in 1718, William inherited the estate of Braco, and continued to lend and acquire more properties. He acquired such a reputation that the Earl of Kintore is reported to have prayed "Lord, keep the Hill of Foudlin between me and Braco." William's son, also called William, went on to become the first Earl of Fife.

The house has continued to be used as a residence and place of business since it was built. In 1971, it was designated a Category A listed building, and in 1975 it was restored and reharled by Meldrum & Mantell. It is currently in use as a shop, with a flat above it.
