= Gordon Tomb =

Architectural structure in Moray, Scotland

The Gordon Tomb
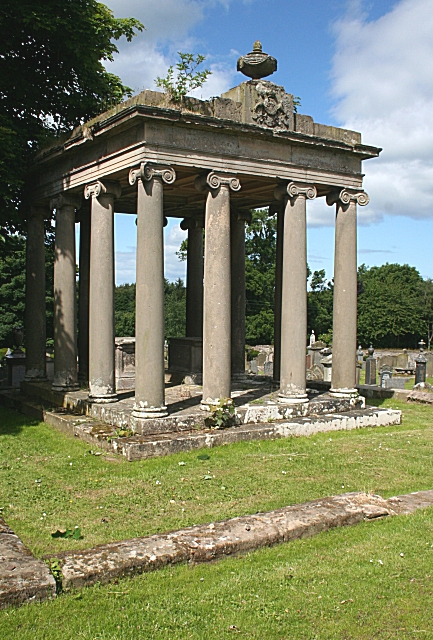
- The Gordon Tomb
- Interactive map of The Gordon Tomb
- Location: Parish of Bellie, Moray
- Coordinates: 57°38′03″N 3°05′05″W
- Beginning date: 1825
- Completion date: 1826

The Gordon Tomb is a classical colonnaded mausoleum in the parish of Bellie in Moray, Scotland. It houses the sarcophagi of the second wife of the 4th Duke of Gordon, Jean Christie (who died in 1824), and her son Adam (died 1834). It is designated as a Category A listed building. The tomb lies within the graveyard of Bellie Old Church, close to the remains of the church.

== Design ==
The tomb is of a neoclassical design. It stands upon a stepped plinth, with carved entablature supported by twelve ionic columns, arranged in a square and containing the sarcophagi. The entablature supports raised armorial panels facing east and west and urn finials. Completed in 1826, it was designed by William Robertson, a local architect who designed buildings for the Established, Episcopal and Catholic churches.
