= Bridge of Avon =

Bridge in Moray, Scotland

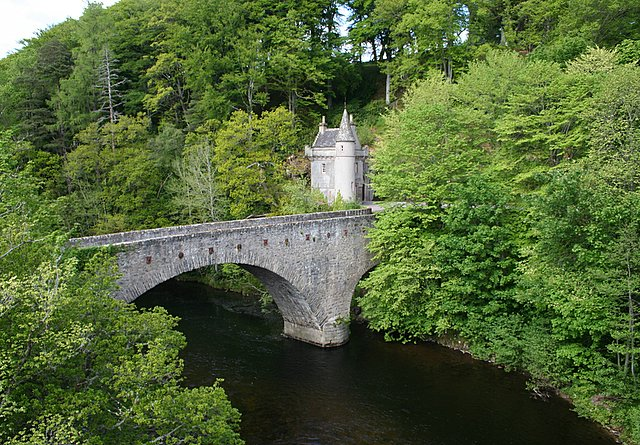
- The Bridge of Avon at Ballindalloch
- Coordinates: 57.40600°N 3.36089°W
- Carries: Pedestrians (formerly road traffic)
- Crosses: River Avon

Characteristics
- Material: Masonry

History
- Designer: George Burn
- Construction start: 1800
- Construction end: 1801

Listed Building – Category A
- Official name: Ballindalloch, Bridge of Avon Over River Avon
- Designated: 22 February 1972
- Reference no.: LB8462

Location
- Interactive map of Bridge of Avon

The Bridge of Avon is a bridge over the River Avon at Ballindalloch in Moray, Scotland, built between 1800 and 1801 by George Burn. The bridge is mainly rubble-built, with an abutment on the south bank, and a pier with a cutwater on the north bank, of tooled ashlar. It crosses the river in a single wide segmental arch, with a smaller flood arch on the north bank.

The south spandrel bears two plaques. The upper plaque records the date of the bridge's construction and its architect's name, and the lower plaque records the height reached by the waters in the catastrophic floods of 4 August 1829, known as the Muckle Spate, which destroyed numerous other bridges in Moray.

The bridge was designated a Category A listed building in 1972. It is no longer open to vehicular traffic, having been bypassed in 1991 by a modern concrete structure that now carries the A95 over the river, but can still be used by pedestrians.

== See also ==
- List of bridges in Scotland
