= Dunphail House =

Building in near Forres, Scotland

- Interactive map of the Dunphail House area

General information
- Architectural style: Italianate
- Location: Edinkillie, near Forres, Scotland
- Coordinates: 57°30′35″N 3°39′14″W
- Construction started: 1828
- Completed: 1829; 197 years ago

Design and construction
- Architect: William Henry Playfair
- Designations: Category A listed building

Dunphail House is an Italianate country house in Moray, Scotland. It was designed by William Henry Playfair for Charles Lennox Cumming-Bruce, and was completed in 1829. Originally designated a Category B listed building in 1971, it was upgraded to Category A in 1987, and remains a privately owned residence.

== History ==
Dunphail House was built between 1828 and 1829 according to a design by William Henry Playfair, the architect responsible for many of the neoclassical buildings in Edinburgh's New Town. It was built near the site of the now-ruined Dunphail Castle for Charles Lennox Cumming-Bruce, a Scottish Conservative politician.

Plans for a new house on the site had already been drawn up by John Baxter in 1787, and by John Patterson from 1817-1820, but it was Playfair's plans, which were his first commission for a country house, that were eventually executed. The same year construction was completed, the nearby River Divie flooded and threatened to destroy the house, with the river bank reportedly collapsing to within 1 yd (0.91 m) of the foundations.

Substantial additions were made to the house in 1871 by Alexander Ross. Electric lighting was first installed in 1883, drawing power from a dynamo turned by water from the River Divie. The interior plasterwork was extensively remodelled between 1928 and 1932 under the direction of John Wittet CBE, president of the Inverness Architectural Association and Lord Provost of Elgin. Renovation work by Ronald Phillips and Partners, sensitive to the original design, removed substantial parts of Ross's addition in 1964.

The house was designated a category B listed building in 1971; it was upgraded to category A in 1987.

== Description ==
The building is of a rectangular Italianate design, mostly of two storeys but with a three-storey tower at the west gable with a pyramidal roof. The original design featured a porte-cochère frontage, which Ross removed and reattached to his own additions in 1871; the 1960s renovation work replaced Ross's frontage with the current porch, which reuses Playfair's original parapet, and features a pair of Roman Doric columns and a Neo-Georgian fanlight. It is constructed of pinned rubble, with polished and tooled ashlar sandstone detailing.

Aside from Wittet's plasterwork, the interior mostly dates from the 1960s renovations, with little of Playfair's original work remaining other than the shape and layout of the rooms.

The house remains a privately owned residence.
