= Blairfindy Castle =

Ruined castle in Moray, Scotland

Coordinates: 57.3412°N 3.3335°W

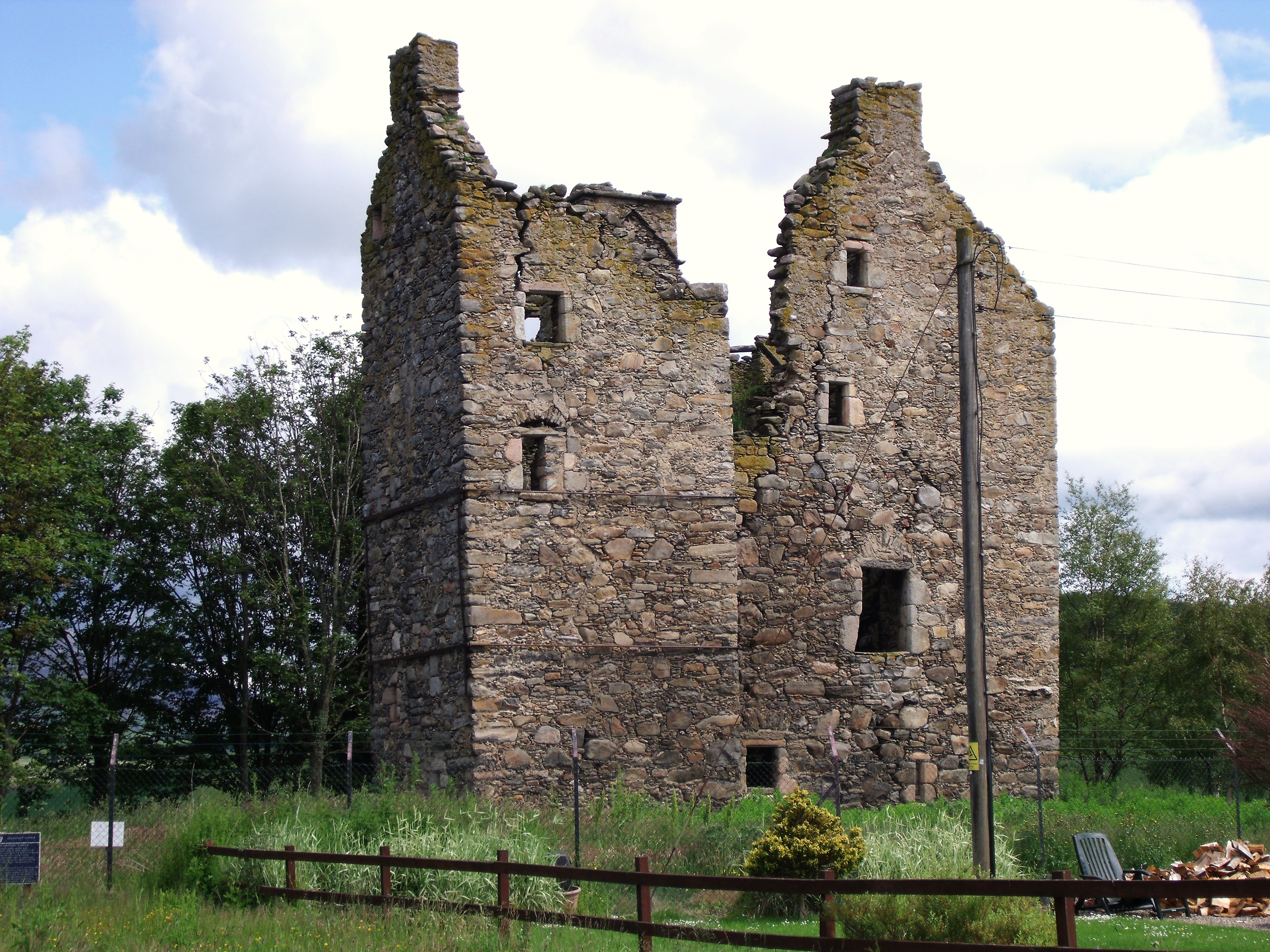

Blairfindy Castle is an L-plan tower house, dating from the 16th century, around 6.5 miles (10.5 km) north of Tomintoul, and west of the River Livet. The tower was a hunting seat of the earls of Huntly.

The building is derelict. However, in 2019, a project to stabilise and make the castle safe was completed. Complete with a new access path and disabled parking alongside an information board, visitors can go inside the castle ruins on a free flow basis.

== History ==
The lands of Blairfindy were historically part of the Lordship of Stratha'an, granted to Earl Duncan of Fife in 1187, and was then inherited by David de Strathbogie, his son. Stratha'an then remained in the hands of the Strathbogies until 1314 when David de Strathbogie was forfeited by King Robert I for treason. Stratha'an was part of the huge regality of Moray granted to Thomas Randolph, eventually reverting to the Crown. Stratha'an was then been granted by King Robert II to his son Alexander, the Wolf of Badenoch, in 1372. The seat of Stratha'an, Drumin Castle, remained with his descendants into the 15th century, but the lands of Blairfindy were separated at an unknown date, possibly remaining with the Lordship of Badenoch.

The first recorded occupants of Blairfindy were Grants, as tenants of the Earl of Huntly in 1470, and the many alterations shown in the ruins suggest they may have erected a tower here. However no record of such a building survives, and when Alexander Gordon of Stratha'an, third son of the Earl of Huntly, married Jean Grant, he may have acquired the estate. It is certain that in 1539 when he exchanged Stratha'an for Cluny with his father, he retained a heritable right to Blairfindy. The present castle was built for his grandson John Gordon, who completed building in 1586, recorded by an armorial stone on the building.

It is close to the site of the Battle of Glenlivet where the Earl of Argyll's Protestant army was defeated by the much smaller army of the Earl of Huntly and the Earl of Errol, in 1594.

In 1600 Thomas Gordon of Cluny chose to erect a new castle for himself at Cluny, a decision which bankrupted him, and forced him to relinquish Blairfindy to the Earl of Huntly. In 1606 the chief of the Grants exchanged the lands of Abernethy for Blairfindy with the Earl of Huntly, so the earl was no longer forced to hold lands from his social inferior. It is from this date that the popular statement referring to Blairfindy Castle as a hunting lodge of the Earls of Huntly dates. In 1647, the Earl of Huntly was kept prisoner at Blairfindy Castle overnight after his capture at Delnabo, and then transferred to Edinburgh for his eventual execution. By 1649, a family of Grants had become tenants of the earl in Blairfindy. The last Grant of Blairfindy was a prominent Jacobite, and in 1746 the "house of Blairfindy" was burned by Government troops after Culloden.

The castle, which belongs to the Crown Estate, was stabilised and extensive works carried out to enable it to be opened to the public began in March 2019, and were completed in the spring of 2021.

== Structure ==
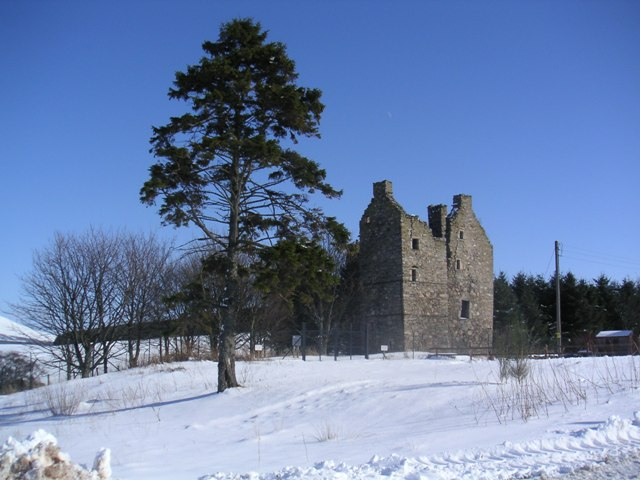

Although the castle is broadly L-plan, its wing projects slightly to allow defence of both sides. A corbelled angle turret arose on the side opposing the stair wing.

In the re-entrant angle is the arched entrance doorway, protected by a shot hole. Overlooking the entrance is a heavily corbelled bretache, with decorative machicolations giving the appearance that missiles could be dropped, although this only provides drainage. On a panel above the doorway are the quartered arms of the Gordons, with the date 1586 and the initials I.G. and M.G. This refers to John Jordon of Cluny and his wife Margaret Gordon. A semicircular stair turret rises above the doorway in the re-entrant angle.

It has been argued that in a tower house of this relatively late date the machicolation was a deliberately archaic addition which gave a warlike appearance to what was essentially a residential building. Some of the window sills contain shot holes at the base, and more can be seen on the small bartizan turret, which are further display features.

The basement of the main building was vaulted with two rooms and a short corridor from the entrance hall. At the north of the block is the kitchen, which has an oven, a large fireplace, and a slop drain. In the north gable was the kitchen fireplace, and on the west side is a series of stone-slabbed wall cupboards, one for each floor. A mural passage at second floor level on the east side perhaps served as a garderobe. To the south was the wine cellar, reached by a mural stair leading from the hall above.

The entrance hall was a small square room with a guard-room and stairs supported in squinch arches leading to the main floor and the turret stair. Above this were small chambers and a watch-room at the top with access to the bretache and probably the attic bedrooms - traces of three dormer windows survive. Each room in the wing had a fireplace; the complex flue arrangements can still be seen.

The whole of the first floor was used for the hall, which was clearly a fine room; with window-seats and a carved fireplace. There were bedrooms at second floor level and in the attic.

It is a category B listed building.
