= St Margaret's Church, Aberlour =

Nineteenth-century church in Aberlour, Scotland

St Margaret's Episcopal Church
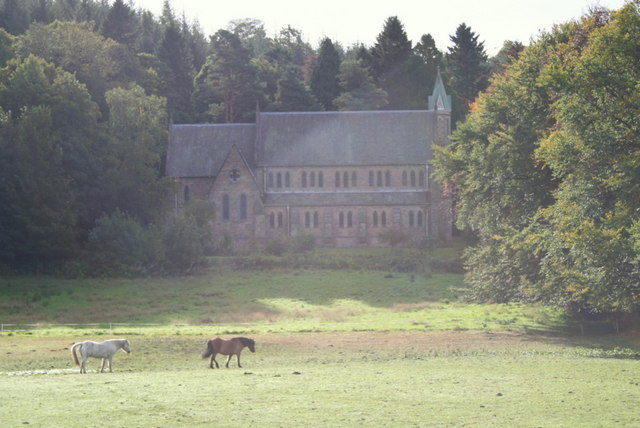
- St Margaret's viewed from the north
- St Margaret's Episcopal Church
- 57°28′21″N 3°12′56″W
- Location: Aberlour, Moray
- Country: Scotland
- Denomination: Scottish Episcopal Church

History
- Founded: 19th century

Architecture
- Functional status: Active
- Heritage designation: Category A listed building

St Margaret's Church is a church of the Scottish Episcopal Church near Aberlour in Moray, Scotland. It is Gothic in style, built mostly of tooled granite rubble, and has a cruciform layout with an east–west oriented nave, transepts to the north and south, and a slender tower at the south-west corner. Its interior is lavishly decorated with polished granite columns topped with ornately carved capitals, marble chancel furniture, and many stained glass windows depicting saints and biblical scenes.

St Margaret's was built between 1875 and 1879 by Alexander Ross and largely paid for by Margaret Macpherson Grant, an heiress who had inherited a large fortune from her uncle Alexander Grant, a slave-owning merchant and planter who had become rich in Jamaica. The church was built as the chapel for an orphanage that she founded in the town; the orphanage has since been demolished, but the church continues to be used for weekly services, and has been designated a Category A listed building.

== Description ==
St Margaret's Church is located in a secluded woodland setting, at the end of a long drive leading uphill from Aberlour's High Street. It is a large cruciform church, built to a Gothic design, made of tooled pink granite with contrasting ashlar detailing.

=== Exterior ===
The church has a tall, five-bay nave, oriented east–west, with a steeply pitched slate roof and lean-to side aisles. The west gable features a four-light window with geometric Gothic tracery. A chancel, somewhat narrower and shorter than the rest of the building, protrudes from the eastern end of the nave; its east gable has lancet windows, the central one taller than the outer two, all below a single continuous hood mould. There are north and south transepts, each buttressed and with two tall lancet windows on their gable ends, and single lancets on their sides; the north transept also has steps leading up to a small door in its side.

At the south-west corner there is a slender, octagonal spire, incorporating a belfry and topped with a copper covering. Adjoining this is a large gabled porch, which provides the main entrance to the building, through a large arched doorway inscribed with the words "This is none other but the house of God." Above the doorway is a niche with a statue of St Margaret, and the arch itself is supported by columns with ornately carved capitals.

The burial ground, which is partially walled and accessed via a pair of rubble gate piers, contains three foundation stones from the now-demolished Aberlour Orphanage, and a war memorial dedicated to boys from the orphanage who died in the First and Second World Wars.

=== Interior ===
The interior of the church is richly decorated with ornate stonework. The nave's side-aisles' arcade arches are supported by thick columns of polished pink granite with octagonal ashlar bases and ornately carved sandstone capitals, produced by Dawson & Strachan, and it is lined with wooden pews with carved ends. The central aisle has a decorative tile floor, and the nave has numerous stained glass windows by G. J. Baguley of Newcastle, depicting various saints. The north and south transepts do not open into the nave, but instead serve as a vestry on the north, and an organ loft on the south. At the west end of the nave is a font, with an elaborately carved wooden cover that originally came from Christ Church in Lancaster Gate, which was demolished in 1977.

The focus of the church is its chancel, at the east end of the building, which is raised up above the level of the nave and separated by an intricate metal rood screen. The chancel houses an array of original furniture, including sedilia, a reredos and altar, all intricately carved in Caen stone, also by Dawson & Strachan, and a brass tabernacle, designed to appear mediaeval, by J. W. Singer and Sons, who also made the sanctuary lamp. There is an elaborately decorative tiled floor, by Minton & Co, and a stone pulpit, raised on a column, by D. and A. Davidson of Inverness. The trio of windows in the east gable feature stained glass, depicting the crucifixion and other biblical events.

== History ==
St Margaret's Church was built between 1875 and 1879 by Alexander Ross, and was originally used as the chapel for the Aberlour Orphanage that was built at the same time. The construction of both was mostly paid for by a local benefactor to the Episcopal Church, Margaret Macpherson Grant.

Macpherson Grant, born Margaret Gordon Macpherson, was the niece of Alexander Grant, an Aberlour-born slave-owner, planter and merchant who made a substantial fortune in Jamaica. Having commissioned William Robertson to build Aberlour House for him, he returned to Aberlour in 1838. He divided his time between Aberlour and London for the rest of his life, and died in 1854. He had no children, and left his entire estate, valued at £300,000 (equivalent to £42,000,000 in 2024), to his niece, who added 'Grant' to her name and moved into Aberlour House, continuing to manage her uncle's Jamaican estates through an agent. She used her fortune to pay for the building of the church and the orphanage, amongst other gifts to the Episcopal Church, but died in 1877 before their construction was completed. William Grant of Elchies paid for the ongoing construction, and the church was completed by 22 November 1879.

The proceeding years saw various improvements and additions to the church: the stained glass windows were installed between 1887 and 1907; the marble chancel furniture was added in 1900; the pulpit was installed in 1936; and the wooden font cover, recovered from a now-demolished church in London, was gifted by the Findlay family in 1978. St Margaret's was designated a Category B listed building in 1976, and upgraded to Category A in 1987.

The orphanage connected with the school was closed in 1967, and the building has now been demolished, with only the clocktower remaining in a memorial garden near the church. The charity that managed the orphanage continues to operate as the Aberlour Child Care Trust.

== Current usage ==
St Margaret's Church is still in use as an active place of worship, with weekly services on Sundays at 10 a.m.
