= Margaret Macpherson Grant =

Nineteenth-century Scottish philanthropist

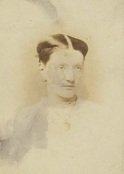
- Born: Margaret Gordon Macpherson; 27 April 1834; Garbity, Aberlour parish, Banffshire, Scotland
- Died: 14 April 1877 (aged 42); Aberlour House, Moray, Scotland
- Other name: Margaret Gordon Macpherson Grant
- Years active: 1854–1877
- Known for: Financing St Margaret's Church, Aberlour and an orphanage
- Family: Clan Grant

Margaret Macpherson Grant (27 April 1834 – 14 April 1877) was a Scottish heiress and philanthropist. Born in Aberlour parish to a local surgeon, she was educated in Hampshire, and was left an only child when her elder brother died in India in 1852. Two years later, she inherited a large fortune from her uncle, Alexander Grant, an Aberlour-born planter and merchant who had become rich in Jamaica.

Macpherson Grant took up residence in Aberlour House, which had been built for her uncle by William Robertson. She lived unconventionally for a woman of her time, dressing in a manner one newspaper called "manly", and entering into what was described as a form of marriage with a female companion, Charlotte Temple, whom she had met in London in 1864. Macpherson Grant donated generously to charitable enterprises, especially those associated with the Scottish Episcopal Church, establishing an orphanage (now the Aberlour Child Care Trust) and founding St Margaret's Episcopal Church in Aberlour. She drank heavily, and despite attempts by friends and family members to persuade her to stop, she always relapsed into alcoholism.

She made several wills over the course of her life that would have left her estate to Temple but, shortly after Temple left her to marry a man, Macpherson Grant revoked her will; she died intestate five months later aged forty-two. Her disinherited former companion sued, and the court determined that the bulk of her fortune should go to cousins, who were most likely unknown to her.

== Early life and family ==
Margaret Macpherson Grant's parents, Annie (née Grant) and Alexander Macpherson, lived in Garbity, Aberlour parish, Banffshire. Her father was a local surgeon in Aberlour, Moray, and her mother, who was from the influential Grant family, was thought to have married beneath her station. The Macphersons married on 30 April 1825, and had their first child, Alexander Grant Macpherson, in 1828; Margaret Macpherson Grant (originally called Margaret Gordon Macpherson) was born on 27 April 1834. While she was in her teens, Macpherson Grant attended school in Hampstead, in north London, studying with Mary Ann Stodart, a writer and activist for women's education. Her brother travelled to India, where he died in 1852, leaving Macpherson Grant as her parents' only surviving child.

Macpherson Grant's uncle on her mother's side was Alexander Grant. Originally from Drumfurrich Farm in Aberlour parish, he had travelled to Jamaica, where he amassed a considerable fortune as a planter and merchant. He was a slave owner, and a member of the Jamaican legislature. It is not certain when he returned to Britain, but it is thought that he was in London by the 1820s, and he visited Aberlour in 1829 to attend to the burial of his father, the farmer George Grant. When slavery was abolished in 1833, Grant benefitted from a government scheme to compensate slave owners, claiming over £24,000 (Note: £24,000 in 1833 equates to approximately £2,500,000 in 2025, according to calculations based on retail price index measure of inflation.) for the loss of his slaves and other business assets. He commissioned the architect William Robertson to build Aberlour House for him, which was completed in 1838. He also had plans to buy the farm on which he was born. Aberlour House became his official residence, although it is doubtful that he ever actually lived there, and he was still engaged in business in London as a West Indies merchant.

Alexander Grant had been involved in business in Jamaica with Alexander Donaldson and Alexander Thomson. As the three men were absentee landlords, affairs on their estates were managed by a team of local attorneys in Kingston, with help from the bookkeepers and overseers who lived on the plantations. This arrangement created issues in settling the debts of their estates after Donaldson's death in 1807, and Thomson's in 1818, resulting in years of litigation among the heirs. Because the ongoing revenues from the estates were inadequate to satisfy the debts and accruing interest, Grant pressed for the plantations to be sold. The trustees in Jamaica, John Meek and Joseph Green, resisted these efforts and ignored orders to sell issued by the High Court of Chancery. The lawsuits would not be fully resolved until 1861, by which time Alexander Grant had died, and his estates had come into the possession of Macpherson Grant.

== Adult life ==
=== Inheritance ===
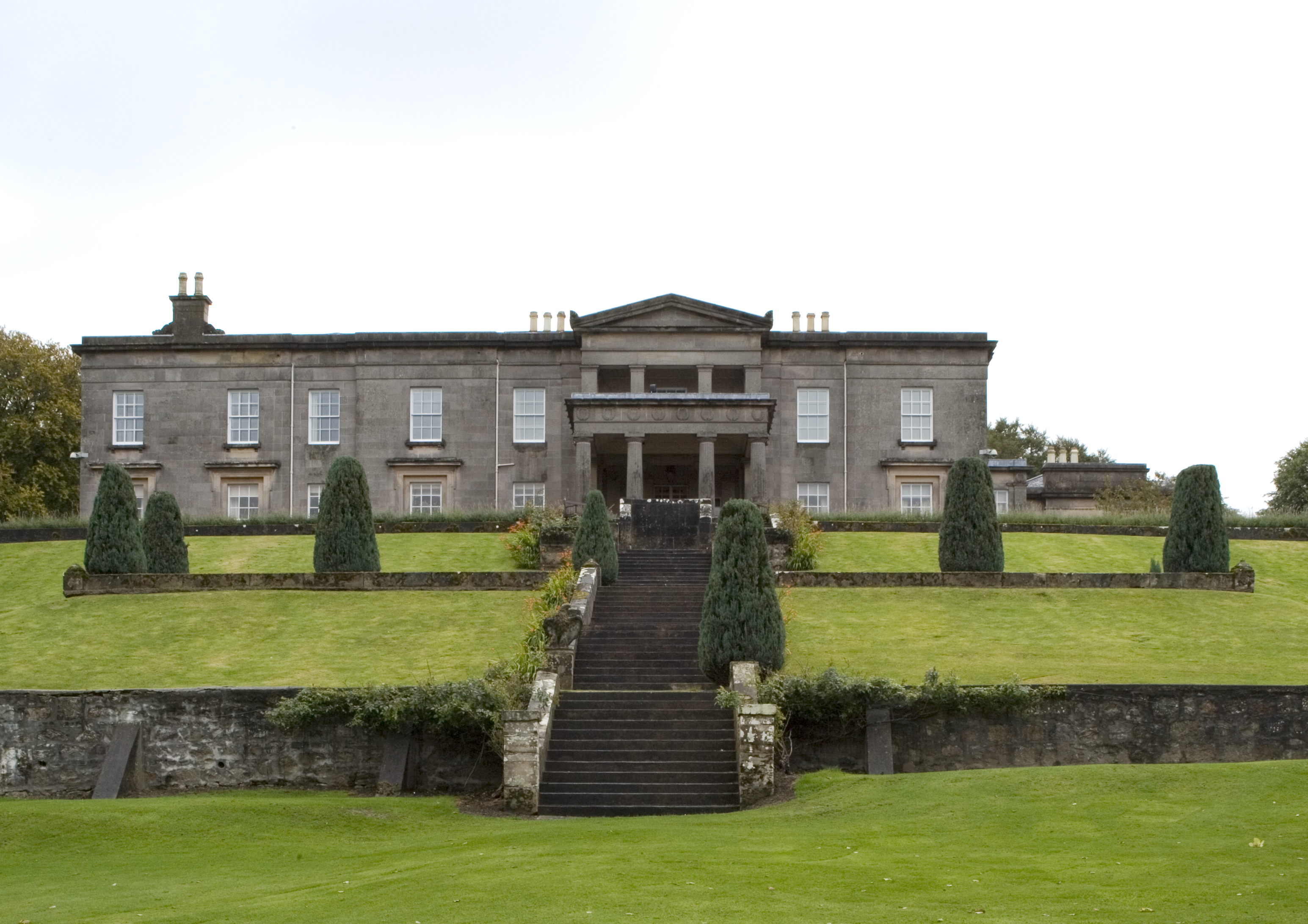
Aberlour House, viewed from the north

When Alexander Grant died in 1854, Macpherson Grant, then twenty years old, inherited the bulk of his wealth, along with Aberlour House and his estates in Scotland and Jamaica, valued in total at £300,000. (Note: £300,000 in 1857 equates to approximately £29,300,000 in 2025, according to calculations based on retail price index measure of inflation.) He also left her an outright settlement of £20,500 (Note: £20,000 in 1857 equates to approximately £2,000,000 in 2025, according to calculations based on retail price index measure of inflation.) payable at his death provided she had attained a majority of twenty years of age, an annuity of £1,500, (Note: £1,500 in 1857 equates to approximately £150,000 in 2025, according to calculations based on retail price index measure of inflation.) and several pieces of jewellery and personal property. Amongst the Jamaican plantations in the inheritance were Brampton Bryan, Bryan Castle, Fairfield, Low Layton, Orange River, Orange Vale, and interests in the estates of Nonsuch and Unity. As with all agricultural concerns, the output of the estates varied with changes in economic conditions. When Orange Vale was first established in 1780, its main source of income was its coffee crop, supplemented by selling or hiring out its slave labourers until 1813. After 1850, the main crop shifted from coffee to raising and marketing cattle. By 1856, the estate was selling pimento and lime, which were produced until 1863. By the time Macpherson Grant inherited the plantation, it was economically failing, and the sale of cattle had become its principal means of generating revenue.

Alexander Grant's will stipulated that he wished Macpherson Grant to take the Grant name. Her father therefore applied on her behalf for royal approval for her to add Grant to her own name, and for her to use the combined arms of the Grant and Macpherson families; consent was given in June 1854. She moved into Aberlour House and immediately started improving and extending the building. To do so, she employed A. & W. Reid, Robertson's nephews, who had continued his practice in Elgin after Robertson's death in 1841. They added bay windows to some of the rooms, expanded the service quarters to make space for a new ballroom, and built a porte-cochère at the principal entrance. Macpherson Grant spent her time salmon fishing and travelling, leaving the management of her Jamaican estates to her agents, Milne & Co in Elgin. She also made a will leaving all her wealth to the Scottish Episcopal Church, of which she was a supporter.

=== With Charlotte Temple ===
While on a trip to London in 1864, Macpherson Grant became friends with Charlotte Temple, the twenty-two-year-old daughter of William Temple, a landowner and former High Sheriff of Wiltshire. Later that year, Temple visited Macpherson Grant in Aberlour and stayed until the spring of 1865. Some weeks after Temple had left, Macpherson Grant returned to London, and the pair renewed their friendship; Macpherson Grant also became acquainted with Temple's social circle. Soon after, Macpherson Grant asked Temple's parents to allow their daughter to live permanently with her at Aberlour, and in return promised to make Temple the heir to her estate. Her parents were reluctant, but eventually agreed. Macpherson Grant went immediately to her solicitors in London, and drew up a new will, instructing that her estate should not go, as she had previously wished, to the Episcopal Church, but to her own children (should she have had any); should she die without issue, her estate would be bequeathed to an elderly aunt named Margaret Gordon, and if the latter had died it would go to Temple. She then joined Temple, who had been waiting in a carriage outside the solicitor's office, and presented her with a pen, saying "Do you know what I have been doing? I have been making you my heir, and here is the pen I did it with; keep it!"

Macpherson Grant and Temple returned to live in Aberlour House, and spent their time engaging in field sports and breeding livestock. Newspapers carried stories of their shooting expeditions and livestock entries at agricultural shows. Macpherson Grant promoted and supported several charitable causes, especially those involving the church. Her relationship with Temple was described in an account of their affair, published in 1882 in The History of the Province of Moray, as being much like a marriage: Macpherson Grant placed a ring upon the ring finger of Temple's left hand, and Temple referred to herself as 'wifie' in letters to Macpherson Grant. This lifestyle was unusual for the time, and was described as "remarkable tomfoolery" in the local press. Newspapers of the time also commented on Macpherson Grant's "strong-minded nature" and described her as "very masculine in appearance and manly in dress". According to the historian Rachel Lang, the scale of her wealth, and of her charitable donations, afforded her "considerable social leeway" and allowed her to be accepted into society.

Macpherson Grant relied heavily on alcohol during the late 1860s. She went through periods of abstinence only to relapse. Temple encouraged her to stop, and tried to prevent any public scandal being caused by her drinking. Macpherson Grant's father also tried to persuade her to reduce her intake; she temporarily stopped drinking when he moved into Aberlour House in 1870, but resumed after he died in April 1871. Following his death, and since her aunt Margaret Gordon had died in 1866, Macpherson Grant thought it necessary to reorganise her affairs. On 31 May 1872, she had her London solicitors prepare a new will, leaving her estate to her own children (again, only if she had had any at the time of her death); if she had no children, her estate was to go to Temple and Temple's heirs. Her Scottish solicitors warned her they were unconvinced that this English document would satisfy the requirements of Scots law. Distressed by the prospect that her will might be contested, she instructed her solicitors to communicate with each other and come to an arrangement that would put the matter beyond question. On 8 March 1873, Gibson-Craig & Co produced another will, leaving the whole of her estate in trust, with a provision that Temple inherit it, or be paid a legacy of £20,000 (Note: £20,000 in 1873 equates to approximately £1,900,000 in 2025, according to calculations based on retail price index measure of inflation.) in the event that any children of Macpherson Grant should contest the settlement. Macpherson Grant also gave instructions that her inheritor should become the bearer of the name and arms of Grant of Aberlour.

=== Philanthropy ===
Macpherson Grant continued to fund enterprises of the Episcopal Church. She provided the organ for Inverness Cathedral, which was built between 1866 and 1869 by the architect Alexander Ross, and in 1874 she persuaded Canon Charles Jupp to come to Aberlour to act as her personal chaplain with the promise to build an orphanage with a church and school. The orphanage was founded in 1875, under Jupp's administration. It initially operated out of a cottage until new buildings were completed. Alexander Ross was engaged to design the orphanage and its chapel, later known as St Margaret's Church, and work on these started in 1875.

=== Temple's marriage ===
At some point in 1875 Harry Farr Yeatman, a retired commander of the Royal Navy, visited Aberlour. It is not known exactly when he arrived, but in August of that year there was a report in the London Standard about his success in shooting on Macpherson Grant's land. The following December, he and Temple became engaged. Macpherson Grant's response to this betrothal was mixed: at times, she seemed positive, and offered to host the wedding at Aberlour House; but she also showed distress at the prospect of Temple leaving her. On 11 December 1875, Macpherson Grant had to be rescued from a fire at Aberlour House, the cause of which was never established. She became increasingly confused – sometimes believing she had rescued her servant from the blaze, while at other times thinking she had sustained a head injury.

On 8 February 1876 Yeatman and Temple were married at St Peter's Church, Eaton Square, in London. Shortly before the marriage, Temple had written to Simon Keir, a partner of Macpherson Grant's agents at Milne & Co, requesting that his accounting of sales no longer be sent to Macpherson Grant directly, but rather to Macpherson Grant's Edinburgh solicitor, Mr Falconer. Unhappy with this new arrangement, and with what he saw as Temple's interfering in his affairs, Keir drew up a deed of revocation, which would cancel Macpherson Grant's existing wills. In November 1876 he visited Aberlour, and Macpherson Grant signed the deed, thereby revoking any claim that Temple, now Yeatman, had on her estate. With Temple now gone, Macpherson Grant was depressed, heavily dependent upon alcohol and, according to Rachel Lang, going through a "psychotic episode". She died on 14 April 1877, after suffering a partial paralysis. Her death occurred before the completion of the orphanage and church and two weeks before her forty-third birthday. She was interred in the Aberlour church yard in a burial aisle she had erected for her parents' graves.

== Legacy ==
Since she had signed the deed of revocation, but had not written a new will, Macpherson Grant died intestate. Her trustee, Mr Falconer, determined that the estate should go to cousins on her father's side of the family: James Proctor, of Tarland, Margaret Proctor, of Banchory, and Alex Proctor, of Rhynie. A case ensued at the Second Division of the Court of Session, wherein the Yeatmans' solicitor, Mr Fraser, argued that Macpherson Grant had been coerced by Keir into signing the deed of revocation, because he was aware of her declining health, and the estate should go to Yeatman as previously agreed. He further argued that it was highly improbable Macpherson Grant would have wanted it to go to the Proctors. Not only had she probably never met them, they were from her father's family; her fortune had been amassed by her maternal uncle who had never thought well of her father. After Fraser made his initial statement, counsels for both parties retired to discuss the case in private. Following more than an hour of negotiation, they returned to court, and the Lord Advocate, who was presiding in the case, announced that they had agreed terms. The estate was to pass to the Proctors, and Yeatman was to receive a settlement of £10,000. (Note: £10,000 in 1887 equates to approximately £1,100,000 in 2025, according to calculations based on retail price index measure of inflation.) She was also entitled to receive a gold watch and a diamond brooch that had belonged to Macpherson Grant, the value of which was to be deducted from the settlement. An 1882 account of the court case noted that the closure denied the public "the full revelation of a curious, an interesting, and instructive romance".

== Later events ==
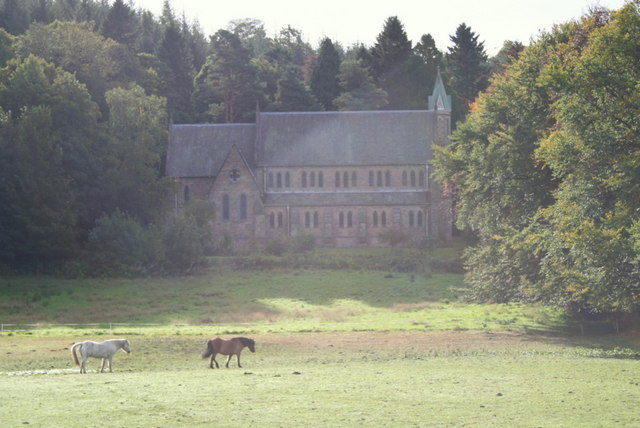
St Margaret's Church, founded by Macpherson Grant

The Yeatmans relocated to Dorset, and had a son, also called Harry Farr Yeatman, who was killed in 1917, aged 37, in the First World War. He is commemorated by a memorial at St Barnabas Church in Sturminster Newton in Dorset.

William Grant (1809–1877), another member of the Grant family and the son of James William Grant of Wester Elchies, paid for the continued construction of the orphanage, and its chapel, St Margaret's Church. He died in 1877, leaving a legacy of £8,000 (Note: £8,000 in 1882 equates to approximately £830,000 in 2025, according to calculations based on retail price index measure of inflation.) to cover the cost of their completion. St Margaret's Church was completed by 23 November 1879. The church was extended and improved in the following decades, has been designated a Category A listed building, and is still used as an active place of worship. The orphanage grew to become the second largest children's home in Scotland, continuing to operate until 1967. The building has since been demolished, leaving only the clocktower in a memorial garden near the church. The charity that managed the orphanage continues to operate as the Aberlour Child Care Trust.

The Proctors, unable to afford the expense of maintaining the estate, sold it to John Ritchie Findlay, the proprietor of The Scotsman newspaper. Findlay expanded his land holdings in the area and was considered to be a benevolent landlord who worked to better the living conditions of his tenant farmers. He died at the estate in 1898. Walkers Shortbread restored Aberlour House to use as their head office.

== Sources ==
- Cant, Ronald G. (1993). "The Historic Architecture of Moray" (PDF). In Sellar, W. D. H. (ed.). Moray: Province and People. Edinburgh: Scottish Society for Northern Studies. pp. 205–224. ISBN 978-0-9505994-7-2. Archived from the original (PDF) on 4 August 2019.
- Chisholm, Hugh, ed. (1911). "Findlay, John Ritchie" . Encyclopædia Britannica. Vol. 10 (11th ed.). Cambridge University Press. p. 354.
- Grant, Alexander (12 June 1854). Will of Alexander Grant, Heritable Propriater of the Lands of Arlington Street Westminster, Middlesex. Kew, London: The National Archives.
- Hall, Catherine; Draper, Nicholas; McClelland, Keith; Donington, Katie; Lang, Rachel (2014). Legacies of British Slave-ownership. Cambridge, UK: Cambridge University Press. ISBN 978-1-107-04005-2.
- Gifford, John (1992). The Buildings of Scotland – Highland and Islands. London: Peguin. ISBN 978-0-140-71071-7.
- Higginbotham, Peter (2002). "The Orphanage, Charlestown of Aberlour, Strathspey, Morayshire, Scotland". Children's Homes. Archived from the original on 18 August 2019.
- Historic Environment Scotland (22 February 1972). "Aberlour House and Terrace (Aberlour House Preparatory School) (Category A Listed Building LB2349)".
- Historic Environment Scotland (14 October 1976). "St Margaret's Episcopal Church and Burial Ground (Category A Listed Building LB20872)".
- Jervise, Andrew (1875). Epitaphs & Inscriptions from Burial Grounds & Old Buildings in the North-east of Scotland, with Historical, Biographical, Genealogical, and Antiquarian Notes, also, an Appendix of Illustrative Papers. Edinburgh: Edmonston and Douglas. OCLC 24298898.
- Lang, Rachel (6 October 2016). "Grant, Margaret Gordon MacPherson née (1834–1877)". Oxford Dictionary of National Biography (online ed.). Oxford University Press. doi:10.1093/ref:odnb/107342. (Subscription, Wikipedia Library access or UK public library membership required.)
- Lang, Rachel (21 March 2014). "Margaret McPherson Grant and the Legacies of Slave-derived Wealth". Legacies of British Slave-ownership. University College London. Archived from the original on 13 August 2019.
- Manning, Sanchez (24 February 2013). "Britain's Colonial Shame: Slave-owners Given Huge Payouts after Abolition". The Independent. London, UK. Archived from the original on 12 December 2019.
- McKean, Charles (1987). The District of Moray – An Illustrated Architectural Guide. Edinburgh: Scottish Academic Press and RIAC Publishing. ISBN 1-87319-048-4.
- Saunders, Paula Veronica (December 2004). Free and Enslaved African Communities in Buff Bay, Jamaica: Daily Life, Resistance, and Kinship, 1750-1834 (PDF) (PhD). Austin, Texas: University of Texas at Austin.
- Shaw, Lachlan; Gordon, James Frederick Skinner (1882). "The Aberlour Succession Case". The History of the Province of Moray: Comprising the Counties of Elgin and Nairn, the Greater Part of the County of Inverness, and a Portion of the County of Banff, – all Called the Province of Moray before there was a Division into Counties. Vol. 1. London, England: Hamilton, Adams & Co. pp. 174–183. OCLC 1110798083.
- Thomson, James (1902). Recollections of a Speyside Parish. Elgin, Scotland: Moray and Nairn Newspaper Company. OCLC 314753528.
- Walker, David W.; Woodworth, Matthew (2015). The Buildings of Scotland – Aberdeenshire: North and Moray. New Haven, Connecticut: Yale University Press. ISBN 978-0-300-20428-5.
- "Aberlour House". CANMORE. Historic Environment Scotland. 2007. Archived from the original on 18 August 2019.
- "Aberlour, St Margaret's Episcopal Church And Burial Ground". CANMORE. Historic Environment Scotland. 2007. Archived from the original on 10 August 2019.
- "Alexander Grant of Aberlour". Legacies of British Slave-ownership. UCL Department of History. Archived from the original on 30 December 2016.
- "Alexander Ross". Dictionary of Scottish Architects. Glasgow Institute of Architects. 2016. Archived from the original on 7 August 2019.
- "Births, Marriages, Deaths". Edinburgh Magazine and Literary Miscellany. Vol. XVI. Edinburgh: Archibald Constable and Company. January–June 1825. p. 768.
- "Bryan Castle Estate". Legacies of British Slave-ownership. University College London. 1832. Archived from the original on 8 December 2019.
- "Captain Henry Farr Yeatman". War Memorials Online. War Memorials Trust. 13 September 2017. Archived from the original on 19 August 2019.
- "Grouse Shooting: The Scotch Moors". Evening Standard. London, England. 14 August 1875. p. 3.
- "India Births and Baptisms, 1786–1947, vol 8, p 152: William Grant". FamilySearch. Salt Lake City, Utah: Genealogical Society of Utah. 16 June 1809. microfilm #498,609. – via FamilySearch (subscription required)
- "Jamaica". The London Gazette (17623). London: H.M. Stationery Office: 1558. 12 August 1820.
- "Jamaica St George 68 (Lowlayton Estate)". Legacies of British Slave-ownership. University College London. 14 December 1835. Archived from the original on 17 October 2019.
- "Jamaica St George 164 (Orange Vale Plantation)". Legacies of British Slave-ownership. University College London. 14 December 1835. Archived from the original on 17 October 2019.
- "Jamaica St Mary 28 (Orange River Estate)". Legacies of British Slave-ownership. University College London. 24 July 1837. Archived from the original on 17 October 2019.
- "Jamaica St Mary 165 (Nonsuch and Unity)". Legacies of British Slave-ownership. University College London. 4 July 1836. Archived from the original on 17 October 2019.
- "Jamaica Trelawney 28 (Bryan Castle Estate)". Legacies of British Slave-ownership. University College London. 4 December 1835. Archived from the original on 17 October 2019.
- "Jamaica Trelawney 29 (Brampton Bryan Estate)". Legacies of British Slave-ownership. University College London. 4 December 1835. Archived from the original on 17 October 2019.
- "Marriages: Yeatman-Temple". The Pall Mall Gazette. London, England. 11 February 1876. p. 3 – via Newspapers.com.
- "Orange Vale Plantation". Legacies of British Slave-ownership. University College London. 1839. Archived from the original on 27 April 2019.
- "Our Environment". Walkers Shortbread. Walkers Shortbread Ltd. 2018. Archived from the original on 26 March 2019.
- "Our History". Aberlour – Scotland's Children's Charity. Aberlour Child Care Trust. Archived from the original on 13 August 2019.
- "Scotland". The Bradford Observer. Edinburgh. 13 July 1854. p. 3 – via Newspapers.com.
- "Scotland Births and Baptisms, 1564–1950: Alexander Grant Macpherson". FamilySearch. Salt Lake City, Utah: Genealogical Society of Utah. 27 March 1828. microfilm 990,813. – via FamilySearch (subscription required)
- "Strathspey". The Glasgow Herald. Glasgow, Scotland. 9 August 1877. p. 3 – via Newspapers.com.
- "William Grant". BillionGraves.com. Lehi, Utah: BillionGraves Holdings, Inc. 14 May 2018.
- "Whitehall, June 14, 1864". The Edinburgh Gazette. Edinburgh. 20 June 1854. p. 513.
- "Yeatman, Harry Farr". Winchester College at War. Winchester College. Archived from the original on 19 August 2019.
