= Aberlour House =

Aberlour House may refer to:

- Aberlour House (building), a country house in Moray
- Aberlour House (school), a preparatory school associated with Gordonstoun
