= James William Grant =

James William Grant may refer to:

- Bill Grant (Florida politician) (born James William Grant in 1943), American banker and politician
- James William Grant (astronomer) (1788–1865), Scottish astronomer and landowner
