= Aberlour =

Coordinates: 57.474°N 3.217°W

Aberlour: Scottish Gaelic: Obar Lobhair
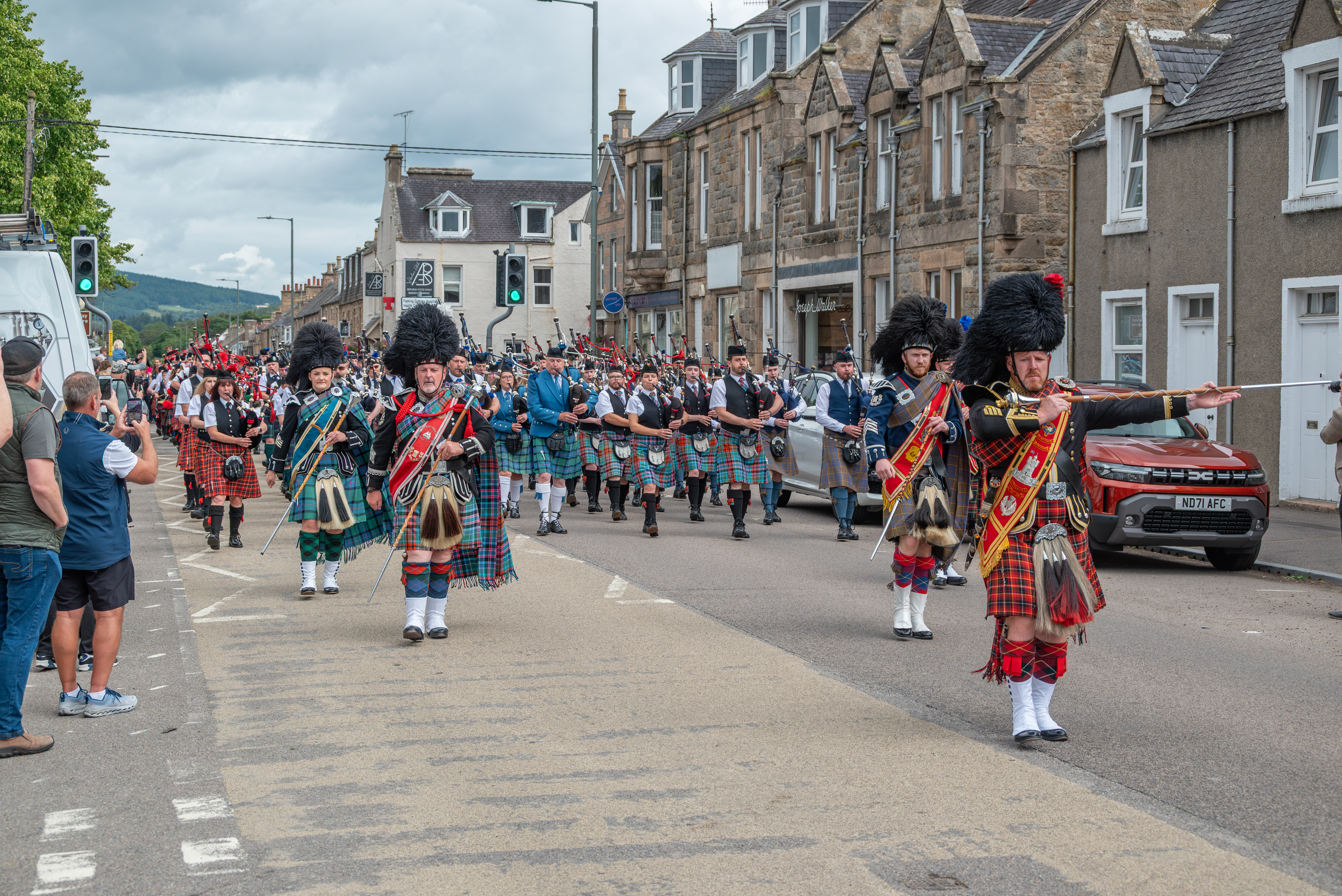
- Aberlour highland march in 2026

- Location within Moray
- Population: 1,020 (2020)
- OS grid reference: NJ271433
- Council area: Moray
- Country: Scotland
- Sovereign state: United Kingdom
- Post town: ABERLOUR
- Postcode district: AB38
- Dialling code: 01340
- Police: Scotland
- Fire: Scottish
- Ambulance: Scottish
- UK Parliament: Moray West, Nairn and Strathspey
- Scottish Parliament: Moray

Aberlour (/æbərˈlaʊər/; Scottish Gaelic: Obar Lobhair) is a town in Moray, Scotland, 12 miles (20 km) south of Elgin on the road to Grantown. The Lour burn is a tributary of the River Spey, and it and the surrounding parish are both named Aberlour, but the name is more commonly used in reference to the village which straddles the stream and flanks the Spey – although the full name of the village is Charlestown of Aberlour.

== Etymology ==
Aberlour, recorded in 1226 as Aberlower, means 'confluence of the Lour burn'. The first element is the Pictish word aber 'river mouth, confluence'. The name of the Lour burn is from Gaelic labhar 'loud, noisy'. This probably replaced an earlier Pictish cognate word. Charlestown refers to Charles Grant of Elchies.

== History ==
A site noted as Abirlaur is shown in this location on maps in Joan Blaeu's Atlas of Scotland, from 1654. The current village, Charlestown of Aberlour, was "founded by Charles Grant of Elchies in 1812 – with the name of Charlestown of Aberlour after his son Charles." It is commonly referred to simply as Aberlour. A grant of land from Charles Grant senior feued 100 plots along the south bank of the river and saw the start of the High Street (formerly Main Street) and parish church. The three locations are close enough in definition for there to be little distinction between them. The village was granted its feu charter in 1814 and began to operate its own markets. Whisky was a major industry even then and once the 1823 Excise Act was passed and a longer warehousing process introduced it began to take on the more mature characteristics that are familiar today.

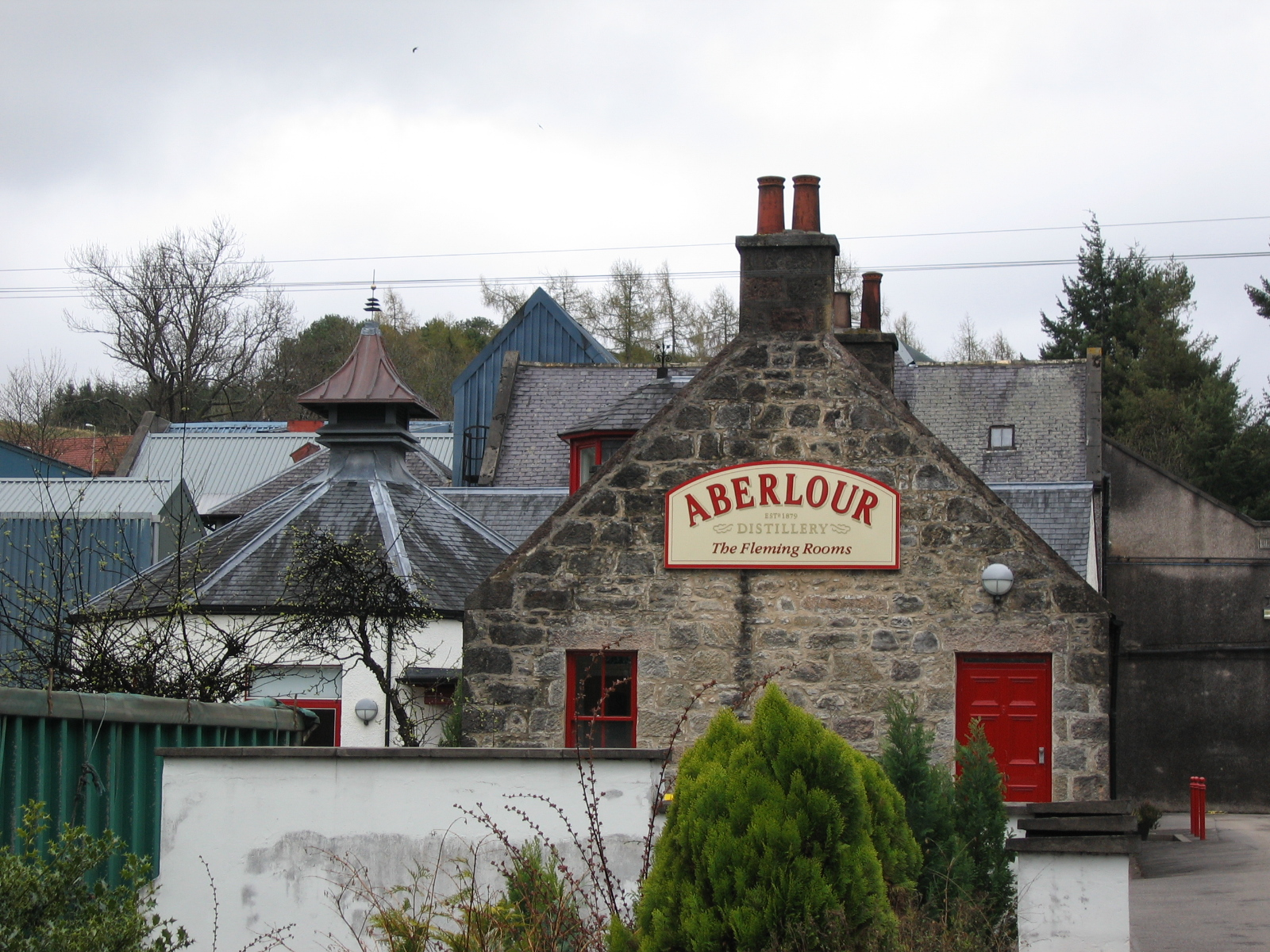
Aberlour distillery

The first Aberlour distillery was established shortly after the Act became law, by the owner of a gentleman's estate where Aberlour House is situated. Soon after the property changed hands, that distillery was demolished. In 1879, local resident James Fleming (1830-1895, built a new Aberlour distillery alongside the Lour Burn; which is now owned and operated by the Pernod Ricard group of companies. Fleming was also a bank agent and became a significant resident and generous benefactor in the village, providing its first purpose-built meeting place, The Fleming Hall (1889), followed by The Fleming Cottage Hospital (1900), and - as a safe pedestrian crossing over the fast-flowing river Spey - The Victoria Bridge, completed in 1902 and known locally as the Penny Bridge.

According to the 1846 A Topographical Dictionary of Scotland, "This parish, formerly called Skirdustan, signifying, in the Gaelic tongue, 'the division of Dustan', its tutelary saint, derived its present name from its situation at the mouth of a noisy burn, which discharges itself into the river Spey."

Aberlour once was the site of an orphanage which was founded in 1875 by Margaret Macpherson Grant and a minister called Charles Jupp. His tomb lies in St Margaret's Episcopal Church which was the church used by the children of the orphanage. The orphanage was split into two separate units – one for the girls and the other for the boys. Between the two buildings was the school where the children were taught. The horror author Dorothy K. Haynes and her twin brother Leonard spent four years, from 1929 to 1933, in Aberlour Orphanage; her experiences are recounted in her 1973 memoir Haste Ye Back. Aberlour Child Care Trust is now one of Scotland's main children's charities with services throughout Scotland. The Trust was also found to be a child care institution where children suffered physical, emotional and sexual abuse at the Scottish Child Abuse Inquiry in 2021.

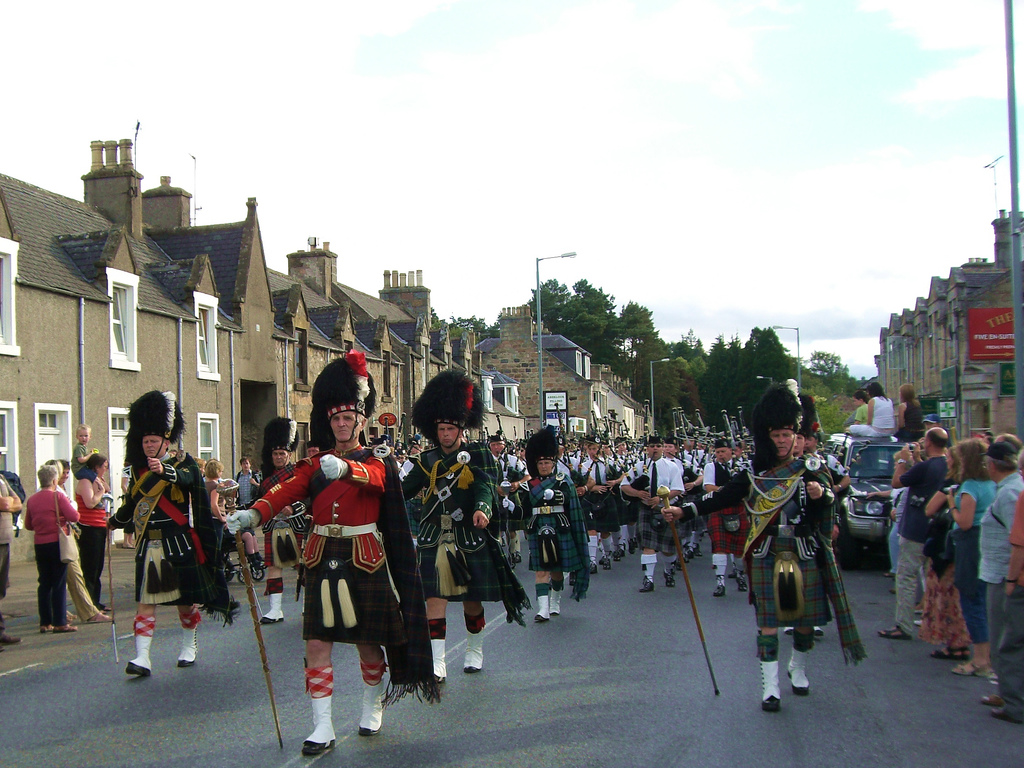
Aberlour parade in 2006

Aberlour is also the place where the famous Walkers shortbread is made. Walkers own the woods behind the factory – Fisherton woods. Until 2004, Aberlour House was the site of a school, a prep school for Gordonstoun; it is now offices for Walkers. Aberlour Golf Club (now defunct) first appeared in 1905 and continued until the late 1930s.

Thomas Telford, the renowned civil engineer designed Craigellachie Bridge spanning the River Spey about 2 miles (3 km) to the north of the village. It was built after the Great Spate in the 19th century destroyed an earlier bridge.

Alexander Cameron Sim, a pharmacist who introduced lemonade (locally called ramune) to Japan, was born in the village.

The area was once served by Aberlour railway station, but this closed on 18 October 1965 as a result of the Beeching Axe.

== Notable residents ==
- Rev James Sellar, minister of the parish church, was Moderator of the General Assembly of the Church of Scotland in 1875.
- James Fleming, founder of Aberlour distillery in 1880; village bank agent; philanthropist.

== See also ==
- Aberlour Distillery
- Glenallachie distillery
