= C18H36O2 =

The molecular formula C_{18}H_{36}O_{2} (molar mass: 284.48 g/mol, exact mass: 284.2715 u) may refer to:

- Ethyl palmitate
- Stearic acid
