= Chill filtering =

Method for removing cloudiness in whisky

Chill filtering is a method in whisky making for removing residue. In chill filtering, whisky is cooled to between 5–10 °C (41–50 °F) and passed through a fine adsorption filter. This is done mostly for cosmetic reasons, to remove cloudiness. However, it is thought by many whisky drinkers to impair the taste by removing the details which differentiate between the many distilleries. At low temperatures, some long-chain esters can come out of solution and form a haze or sediment; the temperature and strength at which a whisky clouds depend on its composition.

== Method ==
Chill filtering prevents the whisky from becoming hazy when in the bottle, when served, when chilled, or when water or ice is added, as well as precluding sedimentation from occurring in the bottles. It works through reducing the temperature sufficiently that some fatty acids, proteins and esters (created during the distillation process) precipitate out and are caught on the filter. Whiskies are usually chilled down to 5–10 °C (41–50 °F).

Factors affecting the chill filtering process include the temperature, number of filters used, and speed at which the whisky is passed through the filters. The slower the process and the more filters used, the more distillates will be collected, but at increasing cost.

This process generally impacts the taste of the whisky, by, for example, removing peat particles that contribute to the complexity, subtlety and smokiness of the flavour. Some distilleries pride themselves on not using this process. Non-chill-filtered whisky is often advertised as being more "natural", "authentic", or "old-fashioned". For example, the Aberlour Distillery's distinctively flavored A'bunadh whisky, Laphroaig's Quarter Cask bottles, Kilchoman' s Machir Bay, and all of Springbank distillery's whiskies are not chill-filtered and are advertised as such. There are also a number of specialist whisky suppliers, such as the Scotch Malt Whisky Society, that provide bottlings from a wide range of distilleries without chill filtering.

== Chemistry ==
Unfiltered whiskies chilled below a certain temperature can force some fatty acid esters out of suspension. In Scotch whisky these are usually agglomerations of ethyl dodecanoate and ethyl hexadeconate. Chill filtering removes these as well as ethyl palmitoleate from the whisky, although complete removal of ethyl dodecanoate is not seen as desirable as it tends to contribute positively to the character of a spirit.
