= St Thomas's Church, Keith =

Catholic church in Keith, Scotland

St Thomas's Roman Catholic Church
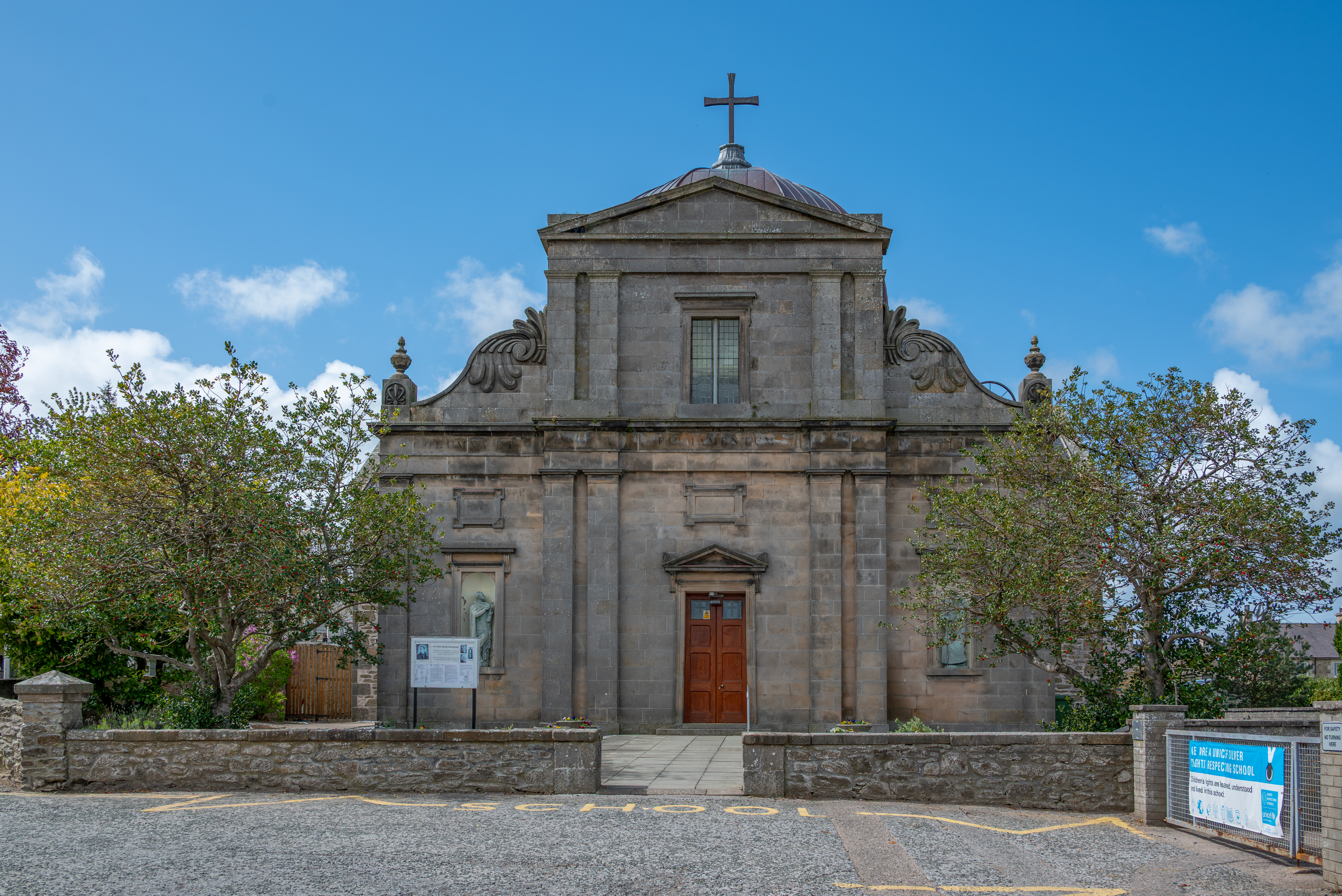
- The east front
- St Thomas's Roman Catholic Church
- 57°32′19″N 2°57′15″W
- Location: Keith, Moray
- Country: Scotland
- Denomination: Roman Catholic

History
- Founded: 1831

Architecture
- Functional status: Active
- Heritage designation: Category A listed building

St Thomas's Church is a Roman Catholic church in Keith, in Moray, Scotland. It is a cruciform building, exhibiting features of neoclassical and baroque architecture, with an elaborate east-facing facade, and north and south transepts with stained glass windows. Originally designed by Walter Lovi and William Robertson in the early 1830s, its large copper dome was added in 1916 by Charles Ménart, who also remodelled the interior. It has been designated a Category A listed building.

== Description ==
St Thomas's is sited in a prominent location on Chapel Street in Keith, facing toward Reidhaven Square, amongst the eighteenth- and nineteenth-century buildings of Keith's new town area. Incorporating elements of neoclassical and baroque design, it has a cruciform shape, with an elaborate east front, made of polished ashlar sandstone, and rubble in flanks and rear. Walker and Woodworth describe St Thomas's as "the grandest and most prominent Catholic church in Moray," and Charles McKean describes its facade as "the best in the area."

=== Exterior ===
The east front is based on the design of Santa Maria della Vittoria in Rome. It has three bays, separated by pilasters, the central one advanced slightly. The side bays, topped with volutes and finials, have corniced central panels which have inset round-topped niches housing statues. The pedimented entrance is in the central bay. An inscription reads Columna et Firmamentum Veritatis. Behind the east front, where the transepts meet the nave, is a large, octagonally faceted copper dome, with oval windows in each face. The dome is made of concrete, covered with sheets of copper, and is topped with a cross finial. The sides and rear of the church are much simpler than the front. Made of granite rubble, each of the transepts has three round-arched windows at their gable ends, and there are lean-to side aisles with rectangular windows. The western end of the building serves as a presbytery, with two storeys and bay windows.

The church sits on a relatively restricted plot of land; there is no graveyard, and only a small garden, in which there is a wooden gazebo.

=== Interior ===
The classical Greek cross-form interior is dominated by the central dome, which is painted with a pattern of gold stars on a dark blue background. Regularly spaced Corinthian pilasters and plaster-cast cornices line the walls of the nave and the sanctuary. The nave and transepts are lined with oak pews, and focused on the shallow chancel at the west end. This contains the high altar, behind which, in a pedimented aedicule, is a painting of the incredulity of St Thomas by François Dubois. The altar itself is of stone, and has three carved panels depicting the Madonna and Child with angels on either side, below a tabernacle.

At the east end of the nave, close to the entrance, is a small gallery, housing a pipe organ, which is accessed via a marble-floored vestibule. There is also a chapel dedicated to St John Ogilvie, who was born nearby.

=== Windows ===
St Thomas's has a number of stained glass windows. The main window in the north transept gable is a war memorial, dated 1918, depicting the crucifixion. The corresponding window in the south transept, signed by J.H. Mauméjean Frères of Paris, shows Christ the Good Shepherd. Each of these main windows is flanked by two smaller windows, dating to the 1970s, by Dom Ninian Sloane of Pluscarden Abbey.

== History ==
The church was designed by Walter Lovi, a Catholic priest and architect, and William Robertson, a well-regarded architect based in Elgin. It was intended to replace the cottage and chapel at Kempcairn that had been used by the local Catholic congregation prior to the 1829 emancipation of Catholics in Scotland. The construction was paid for using money collected by Lovi on a European fund-raising trip, during which Charles X, the King of France, donated the painting by Dubois of St Thomas, which forms the altarpiece. It was opened for worship on 1 August 1831, but work continued on the building until it was completed in 1832.

In 1916, the interior was extensively renovated, and the large dome added, by Charles Ménart. Wood from the campanile, which had been in its place originally, was used to build the gazebo currently present in the church's garden.

It was designated a Category B listed building in 1972, and upgraded to Category A in 1988. It underwent repairs and restoration in 1996, carried out by Oliver Humphries partners.

== Current usage ==
The church is still an active place of worship, presided over by its dean, Father Colin Stuart. There are Masses every day except Wednesdays, and confessions are heard on Fridays.
