= Walter Lovi =

Scottish Catholic priest and architect (1796 – 1878)

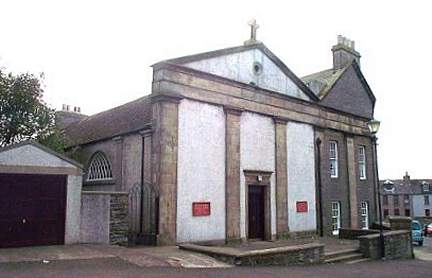
St Joachim's RC Church in Wick

Father Walter Lovi (1796 – 1878) was a Roman Catholic priest and architect, active in Scotland in the mid-nineteenth century. He was born in Edinburgh in 1796, the son of a Scottish mother and an Italian father. He studied at Scots College in Rome, and at St Sulpice's seminary in Paris, where he was ordained at the age of 26.

It is possible that Lovi may have worked with James Kyle on the design of St Mary's Roman Catholic Church in Dufftown, Banffshire between 1824 and 1825, and he worked with the architect William Robertson on St Thomas's in Keith between 1831 and 1832.

In 1832, Kyle dispatched him to Wick to establish a Roman Catholic chapel there, to serve the needs of the large migrant workforce, a significant proportion of whom were Irish Roman Catholics, who came to the area seasonally to work in the herring fishery. Initially he found the local Protestant population unwilling to rent him a place that he could use to celebrate mass, but he was eventually given a choice of plots on which to build a church by the townsfolk in gratitude for his efforts in setting up a hospital and tending to the needs of the victims of a cholera outbreak in the town. He chose a site on Malcolm Street and, again working with William Robertson, built St Joachim's Church, which opened in 1836 and is still in use as an active place of worship. St Joachim's, so named because the feast day of St Joachim falls within the fishing season, was designated a Category B listed building in 1979. A plaque mounted on the wall of the church reads "This church was built c.1835 by Father Walter Lovi on a site made available to him by a grateful community for his heroic services during the cholera epidemic of 1832".

Lovi left Wick soon after the church was built, and helped tend the sick in cholera outbreaks in various different parts of the country. He also supervised construction of St Andrew's Roman Catholic Church in Braemar in 1839, and assisted Kyle with the completion and remodelling of the Church of The Incarnation in Tombae between 1843 and 1844.

Lovi died in 1878.
