= Church of The Incarnation, Tombae =

Roman Catholic Church of the Incarnation
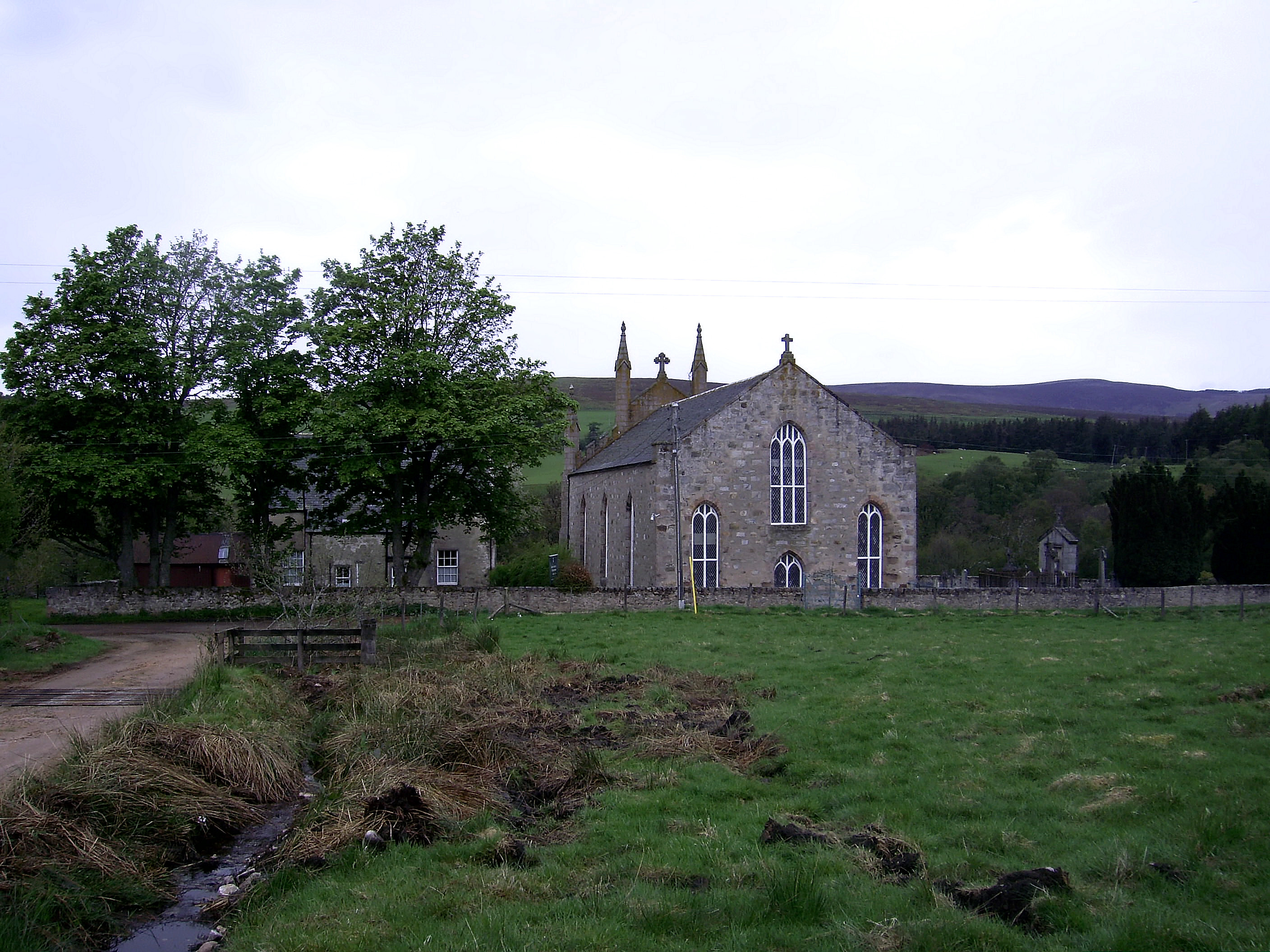
- The east gable (presented to the main road)
- Roman Catholic Church of the Incarnation
- 57°18′54″N 3°18′04″W
- Location: Glenlivet
- Country: Scotland
- Denomination: Roman Catholic

History
- Founded: 1829

Architecture
- Functional status: Inactive
- Heritage designation: Category A listed building

The Church of The Incarnation was built between 1827 and 1829 as a Roman Catholic church, under the patronage of the Gordon family, in Banffshire, Scotland. It was originally built by John Gall, and finished between 1843 and 1844 by James Kyle with assistance from Walter Lovi. It was designated a Category B listed building in 1972, and upgraded to Category A in 1987. It ceased being used as an active church in 2012, and as of 2019 is on the Buildings at Risk Register for Scotland, described as being at moderate risk, and in poor condition.

== History ==
A Catholic priest, under the patronage of the Gordons, was active in the Tombae area since at least 1745, many years before the emancipation of Catholics in Scotland. The Church of the Incarnation was built to supersede a mass house that had been used for worship at nearby Kinakyle, which was badly damaged in floods in 1829 and no longer exists. The builder was John Gall, an Aberdeen cabinet maker, builder and architect, whose two sons were Catholic priests. The foundation stone was laid in 1827, and it was opened for worship on 2 February 1829, although it was unfinished at that point.

The building was completed, and the interior remodelled, by James Kyle, the Roman Catholic bishop of Aberdeen, with assistance from Walter Lovi, a priest and architect who worked on numerous church buildings in the region from the 1820s to the 1840s.

The building was designated a Category B listed building in 1972; it was upgraded to Category A in 1987.

The church was closed in 2012 due to concerns over the structure, and the danger of falling slates. In 2013, it was added to the Buildings at Risk Register for Scotland, with the roof continuing to shed slates, problems with the guttering and pointing, and minor structural cracks. As of March 2018, it was on the market for sale.

== Description ==
The church is designed in the Gothic Revival style, and is oriented roughly east–west, with the main entrance in the gabled west front, which unusually faces away from the main road and approach to the building. It has a tooled pink granite ashlar gothic frontage and detailing, originally with harled sides and rear, but with much of the harling now removed exposing the rubble masonry. A large, single, wooden door within a deeply recessed pointed arch provides the main entrance in the west front, beneath a pointed-arch window with intersecting tracery and latticed glazing, with similar windows to either side. There is a large Celtic cross on the apex of the gable.

The side elevations each have three point-arch windows, also with intersecting tracery and latticed panes. The east gable, which faces the road, has similar stonework to the side elevations, tall narrow windows, and a stone cross finial.

The interior is rib-vaulted throughout, supported by timber-panelled cast iron columns. A decorated pipe organ, made by Conacher in Huddersfield, was originally installed in a narrow gallery on the western wall, but after the church ceased being used as a place of worship, the organ was dismantled and donated to the Lebanese Evangelical Church. It was installed in the chapel of the Johann Ludwig Schneller School in Lebanon in 2017.

The churchyard contains the family vault of George Smith, the founder of the Glenlivet distillery, who died in 1871 at the age of 75.

== Current Usage ==
The church was closed to the public in 2012, and put up for sale in 2018. It is currently rated as being at moderate risk, and in a poor condition.
