= Scotch Malt Whisky Society =

Whisky club Based in Edinburgh, Scotland

The Scotch Malt Whisky Society Ltd.
- Founded: 1983; 43 years ago
- Founder: Phillip Hills
- Headquarters: Edinburgh, Scotland, UK
- Owner: The Artisanal Spirits Company plc
- Website: www.smws.com

The Scotch Malt Whisky Society (SMWS), is a membership organisation based in Edinburgh, Scotland. It bottles and sells single malt whisky from Scotland and throughout the world, directly to its members. The society also runs four private members' rooms in the United Kingdom and in several international locations.

== History ==
The origins of the Society lie in Phillip "Pip" Hills' travels around the Scottish Highlands in the late 1970s, during which he sampled several whiskies drawn straight from the cask.

Hills was so affected by what he tasted that, in 1978, he persuaded several acquaintances to share in the cost of a cask from the Glenfarclas distillery. Over time, the group of friends expanded to become a small syndicate and more casks were purchased, bottled and distributed to subscribing members.

Coinciding with the decision to open membership to the wider public in 1983, the Society purchased its first property, The Vaults, in Leith; a building, whose vaulted wine cellars reputedly stretch back to the 12th century.

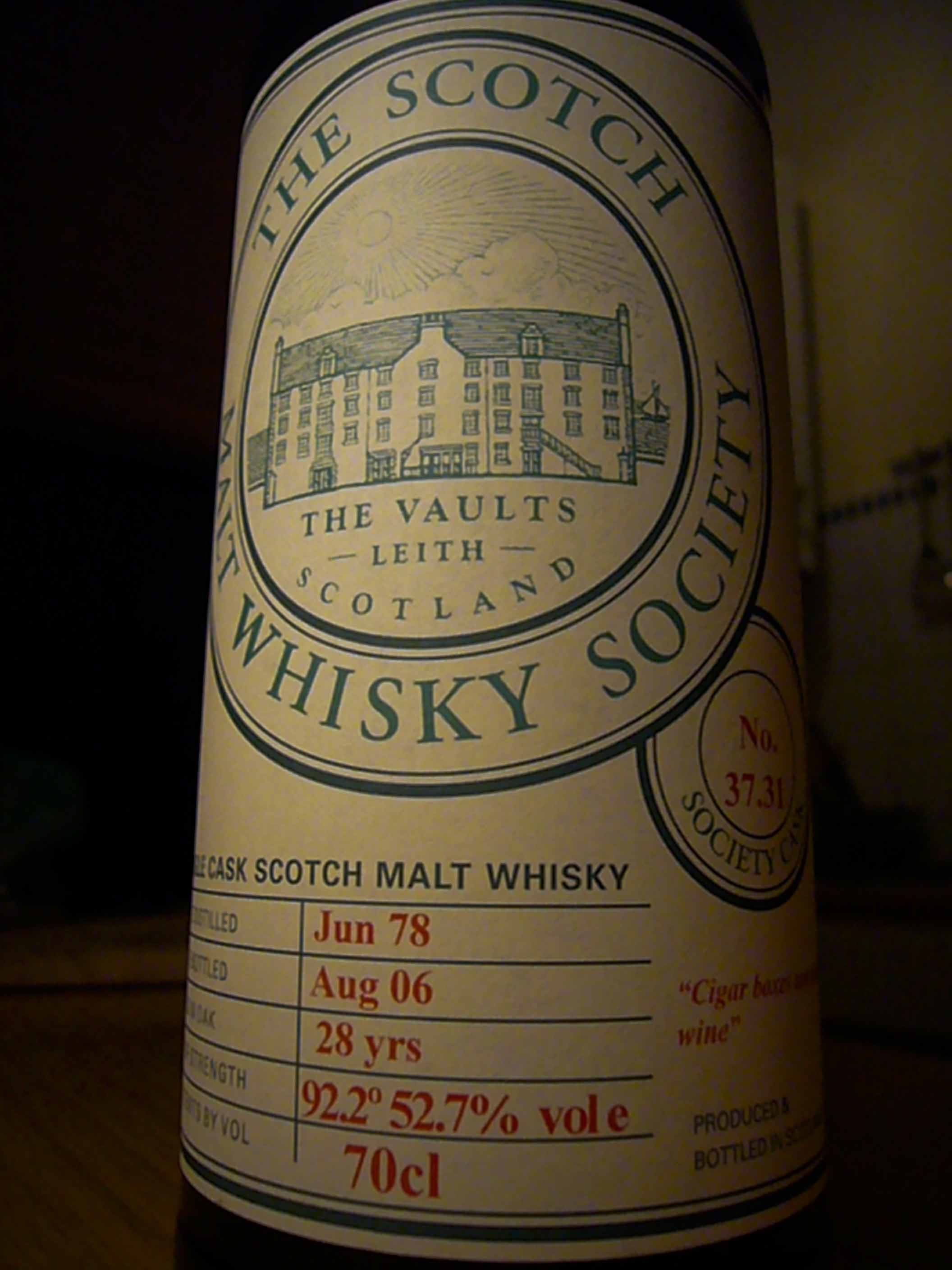
Bottle of whisky from the Scotch Malt Whisky Society

The Society created a set of members' rooms there.

In 1996, the Society launched a share scheme for its members, the proceeds from which were invested in the purchase of a London venue.

2004 saw the Society open a second venue in Edinburgh – a Georgian townhouse on Queen Street. In the same year, the Society was acquired by Glenmorangie plc.

To mark the 25th anniversary of its foundation, the Society redesigned its bottles, to include more information and a full tasting note on the front of the bottle.

In 2010, the Society partnered with Hotel du Vin & Malmaison hotel chains to introduce a new 'whisky snug' bar concept to their hotels.

In 2015, the Society was sold back to private investors from Glenmorangie plc (now under the ownership of LVMH).

In June 2021, the private owners floated the holding company The Artisanal Spirits Company plc on the Alternative Investment Market of the London Stock Exchange.

== Membership ==
To buy whisky bottled by the Scotch Malt Whisky Society, it is necessary to be a member.

Membership entitles members to buy Society whisky and also gives members access to its private members' venues (along with the ability to bring 3 non-member guests), and the opportunity to buy tickets for various tasting events.

== Locations ==
The Society has four Members' Rooms in the UK, where whiskies are sold by the bottle or for consumption on the premises by the dram. Two are located in Edinburgh, and one each in Glasgow and London. The Society also operates a non-member bar under the Kaleidoscope brand. There is a Kaleidoscope bar situated at the Queen Street venue in Edinburgh which sits alongside the company's members–only bar upstairs. The second Kaleidoscope venue was based in Devonshire Square in central London but has since closed.

It also has branches in Australia, Austria, Belgium, Canada, China, Denmark, France, Germany, Hong Kong, Italy, Japan, Luxembourg, Malaysia, Netherlands, New Zealand, Philippines, Poland, Singapore, Sweden, Switzerland, Taiwan, Thailand, and the U.S.A.

== Bottlings ==
Casks are only acquired by the Society after approval by an appointed 'Tasting Panel', comprising Society representatives, those directly involved in the distilling industry and various other suitably qualified parties.

The Tasting Panel also gives each bottling a whimsical set of tasting notes which provide an indication of what flavours and textures the drinker can expect. Each bottle is also given a quirky and descriptive name – such as 'Kissed up by sweet promises' or 'Intense menu of seduction'.

The resulting 'outturn' of each cask is given a unique, two-part numerical identifier, representing first the originating distillery and second the individual cask from which the bottle was taken. For example, 2.35 represents the 35th cask acquired from distillery number two. Society bottlings are always referred to using this numerical code, rather than by the distillery name, as individual casks are unique and, therefore, may not be representative of the whisky produced by that distillery for ordinary retail.

The number of bottles available from each outturn of a cask can vary – but single casks by their very nature only produce a limited amount of whisky so, more often than not, there is only a small number of bottles available. The Society releases new whisky selections for its members once or twice a month.

The Society has also bottled single casks from grain whisky distilleries, identified by the prefix 'G' in the cask number. Other non-whisky spirits have been released, such as gin, rum, and cognac, as well as blended whisky. Each variety has their own bottle number prefix.

As of September 2010, around 3,597 single casks had been bottled by the Society since 1983.

Most SMWS whiskies is bottled at its original cask strength, typically upwards of 55 per cent alcohol by volume (ABV). It is more common in the Scotch whisky industry to reduce the spirit at bottling to around 40 per cent and put it through a chill filtering process, which prevents it from clouding at low temperatures.
