= Aberlour distillery =

Whisky distillery in Scotland

Coordinates: 57°28′2″N 3°13′44″W

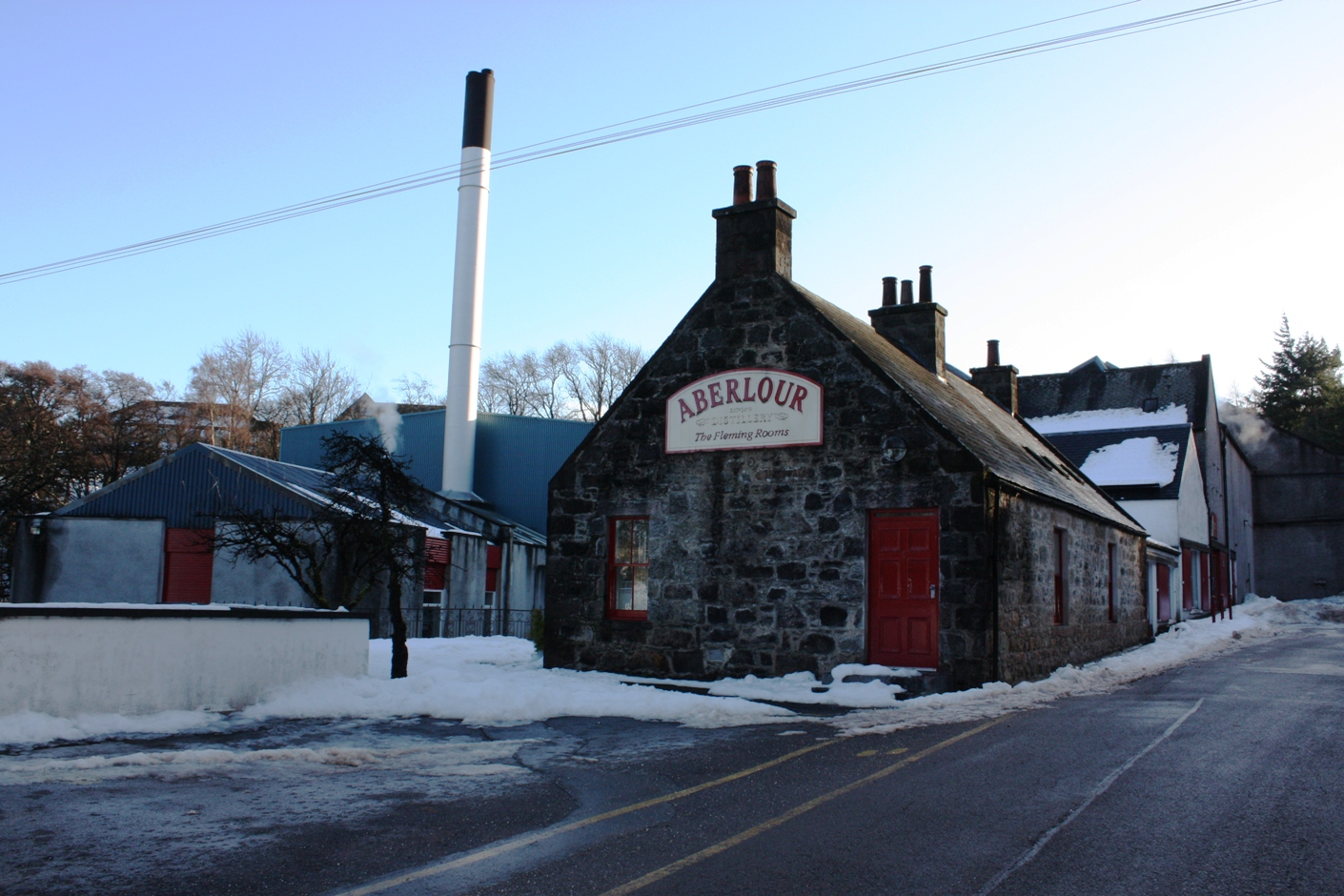
- Aberlour distillery

Region: Speyside
- Location: Aberlour
- Owner: Chivas Brothers (Pernod Ricard)
- Founded: 1879
- Founder: James Fleming
- Status: Active
- Water source: Birkenbush, Target spring
- No. of stills: 2 Wash stills: each 21,310 L; 2 Spirit stills: 20,000 L and 15,456 L
- Capacity: 3.900,000 L
- Website: www.aberlour.com

Aberlour distillery (/æbərˈlaʊər/) is a Speyside single malt Scotch whisky distillery, in Aberlour, Strathspey, Scotland, at the confluence of the Lour Burn and River Spey near Ben Rinnes.

== History ==
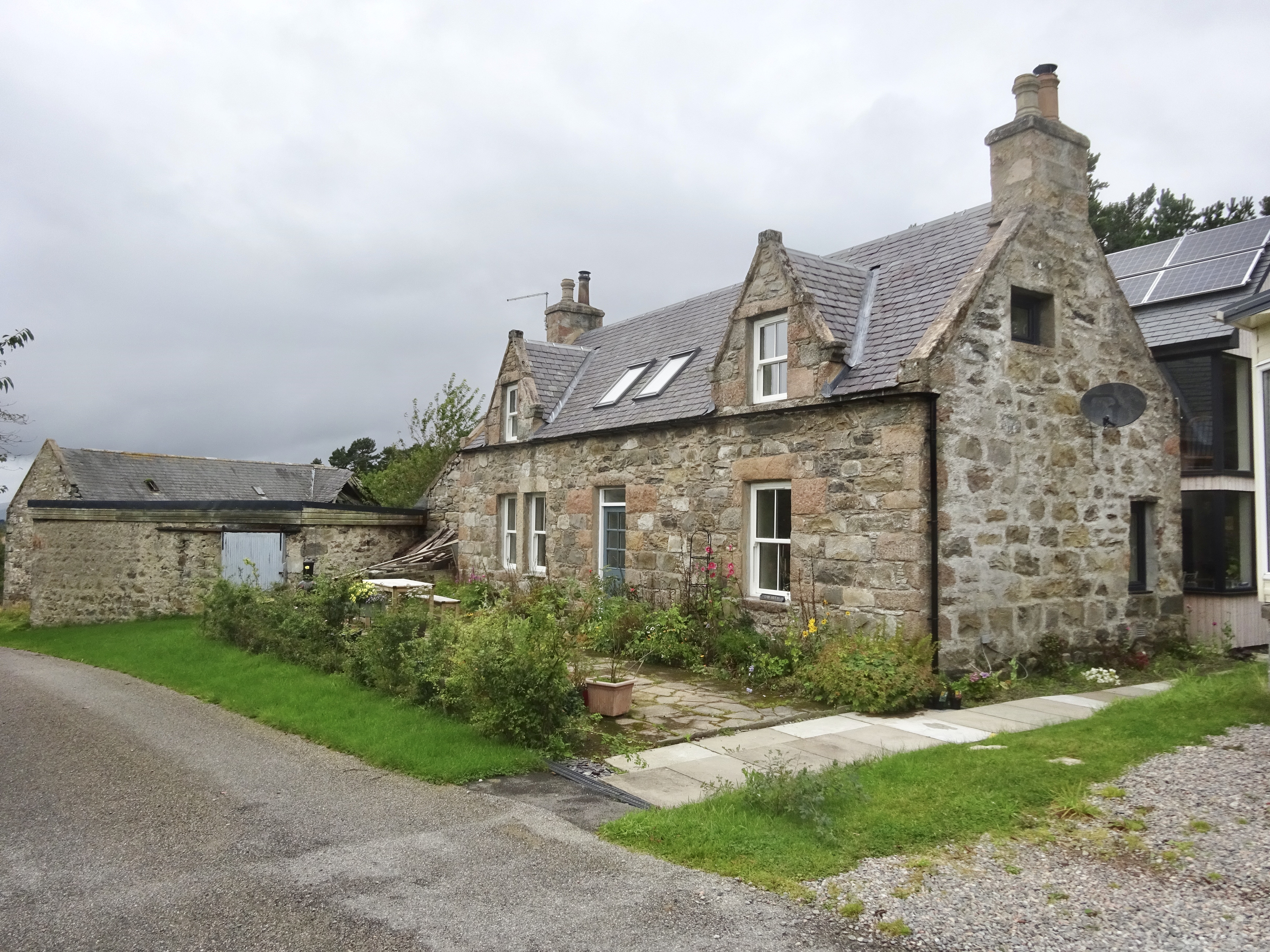
Tomfarclas Farm, Inveravon

James Fleming (1830–1895) was born and baptised on the first day of June at Inveravon, the only son of a tenant farmer at Tomfarclas on the Ballindalloch estate. James helped his father on the farm until manhood and then sought a wider and more financially rewarding direction for his future, first as a commission agent and dealer in the grain trade.

In the mid-1860s, he acquired a lease of the Dailuaine distillery at nearby Carron and held it for ten years, making connections in the spirit markets. By the 1871 Census, James had moved to Aberlour, and in 1874 established and developed a new branch agency for the North of Scotland Bank. He became a prominent and respected member of the local community; as an elder of the parish church and in several public positions: chairman of the School Board, county councillor, and town Provost.

In 1879, Fleming secured a feu from the Earl of Fife on the land where he planned to build the Aberlour distillery and, upon its completion, produced whisky there from December 1880. He sold the business to his acting agents, Robert Thorne & Sons in 1892. James Fleming died aged 65, leaving a significant and tangible legacy. He built Aberlour's first public meeting place, The Fleming Hall in 1889. This was followed in 1900 by the Fleming Cottage Hospital providing isolation accommodation to limit the spread of infectious diseases. In James Thomson's 1902 book Recollections of a Speyside Parish, the author wrote: "The hospital that has been built and endowed by his [Fleming's] liberality will always remain a memorial to his Christian philanthropy. I can well remember more than one epidemic that devastated many a home in the village. Had there been at the time such an institution in the place, many lives might have been saved."

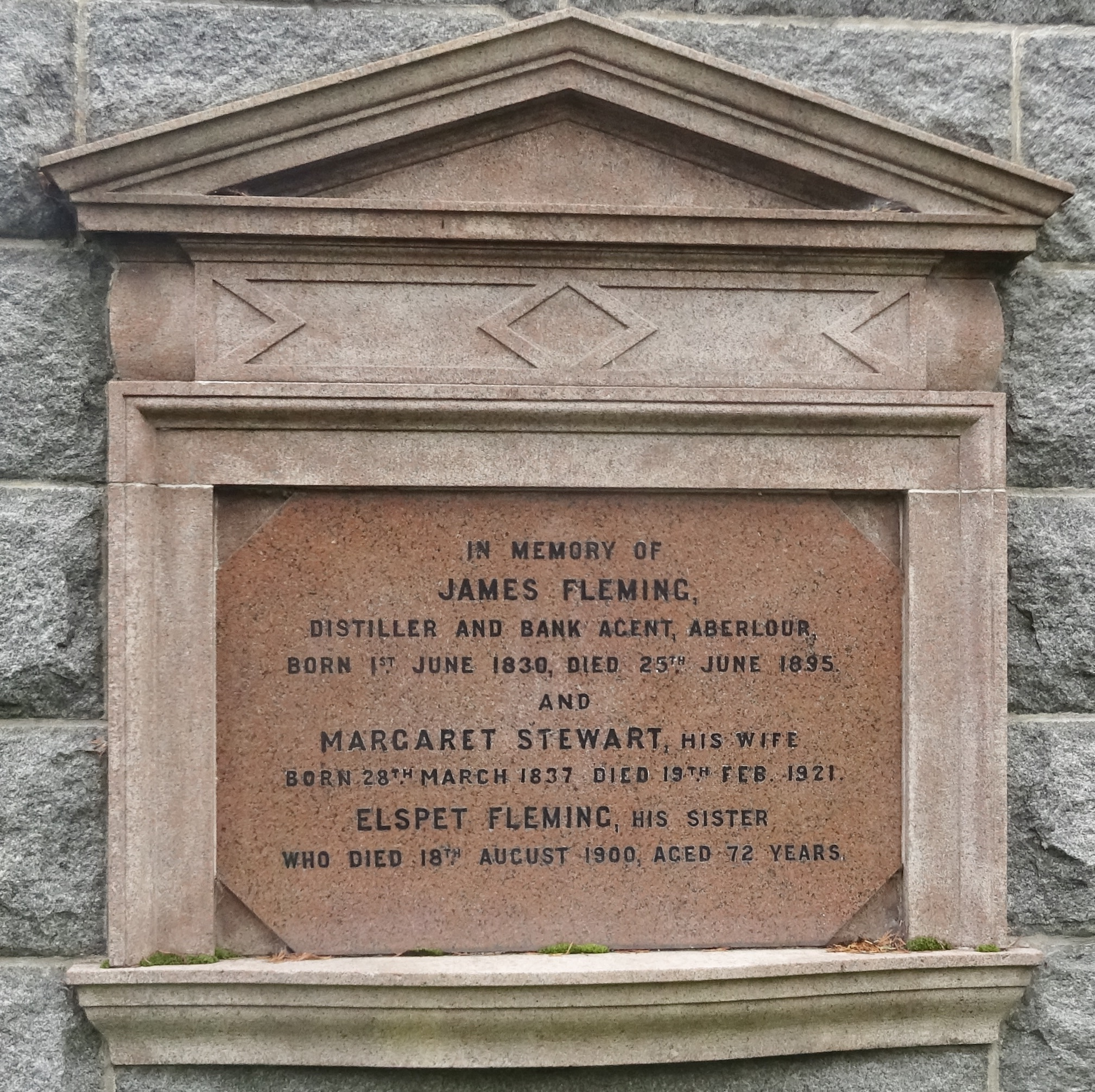
Memorial plaque to Aberlour distillery's founder, his wife and sister

Fleming's commitment to improving the welfare of local people is evidenced by another bequest made on 11 June 1895, two weeks before his death: "I leave a sum of five hundred pounds for the purpose of erecting a steel wire footbridge over the river Spey at Aberlour at a place as near as possible to the mouth of the burn of Ruthrie [the Lour Burn] so as to connect the village of Charlestown with the parish of Knockando." Safety, as well as convenience, being his concern following a number of reported drowning tragedies in the fast-flowing waters during his lifetime. After delays in its approval by an obstinate landowner, the Victoria Bridge, Aberlour – often referred to as the Penny Bridge locally – was completed and opened without ceremony in 1902. James Fleming is buried in the town's cemetery almost opposite the distillery site.

Robert Thorne & Sons Ltd. sold the Aberlour distillery in 1920 to a brewing family, W.H. Holt & Sons, based near Manchester, England. In 1945, ownership passed to S. Campbell & Sons Ltd and the distillery was later re-equppied with four stills in 1973. In 1975, Pernod Ricard acquired Campbell Distilleries, and they joined with Chivas Brothers in 2001 forming a portfolio of 14 single malt distilleries and one grain distillery in Scotland, and two gin distilleries in England. In 2002, a new modernised visitor centre was opened for public visits and tours. In 2014, over 3.5 million bottles of Aberlour were sold.

== Bottlings ==
The whisky comes in a variety of ages, including a 10, 12, 15, 16, 18 and a rare 30-year-old 1970 vintage malt, as well as a cask strength release, A'bunadh, with no age statement. Most of the variants are aged in American ex-bourbon casks, a standard for many single malts. Aberlour also releases a range of malts that, after aging in bourbon casks, are finished in casks previously used to mature varieties of fortified wines or sherries, a method applied to appeal particularly to the French market.

== Reviews ==
Since 1986, Aberlour Single Malt Scotch Whisky has won 58 Gold awards and 8 Trophies in the Tasting categories of two leading industry competitions, the International Wine and Spirits Competition (IWSC) and International Spirits Challenge (ISC).
