= Milton Brodie House =

Historic mansion near Kinloss, Scotland

Coordinates: 57°38′50″N 3°31′22″W

- Interactive map of the Milton Brodie House area

General information
- Location: Near Kinloss, Moray, Scotland
- Completed: 1710; 316 years ago
- Renovated: 1835–1841

Design and construction
- Designations: Category A listed building

Milton Brodie House is a mansion near Kinloss in Moray, Scotland. Built for the Brodie family in 1710 on the site of an older tower house, it was originally called Windhills, but was renamed to commemorate the Milton estate that the family had formerly owned. It was substantially remodelled between 1835 and 1841 by William Robertson, and was designated a Category A listed building in 1989.

== Description ==
The nineteenth-century south facade of the house, which is rendered with incisions made to resemble ashlar, has seven bays, the central five with a single storey, and with the outer bays of two storeys advanced and wider than the rest, designed to camouflage the rear gable ends of the original house to the rear. In the centre of the facade is the main entrance, with a tetrastyle portico supported by Ionic columns.

The rest of the house is of two storeys plus an attic, and has four staircases, each one serving what were once free-standing wings prior to the addition of the facade. It is harled, with ashlar detailing. Its interior retains elaborate decorations, including plaster cornices and marble chimneypieces, dating from Robertson's remodelling.

In the grounds is an 18th-century garden house, octagonal in shape with a pyramid roof, which contains a sundial dated to 1661. The grounds are accessed by two gates, which have square ashlar gatepiers with carved ball finials, which are included in the listing for the building.

The house has been praised for its elegance. Architectural historians David Walker and Matthew Woodworth, writing in their Pevsner guidebook on the region, describe it as a "decidedly elegant country villa, and the epitome of summer splendour", while Charles McKean calls it "a delightful courtyard house", and praises its "unusually beautiful, feminine south front".

== History ==
The land that Milton Brodie House stands on was owned by Kinloss Abbey from the late 12th century, and around 1587 James Dundas, the chantor of Moray, built a tower house on the site, known as Windhills. Around 1653, the estate was acquired by the Brodie family, who demolished the tower house, and in 1710 built a U-plan Georgian mansion with courtyard, to which additional wings were added in the mid-18th century, and which still forms the core part of the house. This house was originally knows as Windyhills, after the tower house it replaced, but when James Brodie of Windyhills died in 1741, the estate passed to a relative, George Brodie, whose family estate of Milton (now Miltonduff) had been sold by his father to the Duffs of Braco; the family renamed the house Milton Brodie.

Between 1835 and 1841, William Robertson performed substantial alterations to the house, reorienting it with the addition of the south facade, and completely filling in the original courtyard.

Alterations were made to the house in 1987 by the conservation architect James Dunbar-Nasmith, and in 1989 it was designated a Category A listed building.
