= St Joachim's Church, Wick =

Coordinates: 58°26′20″N 3°05′25″W

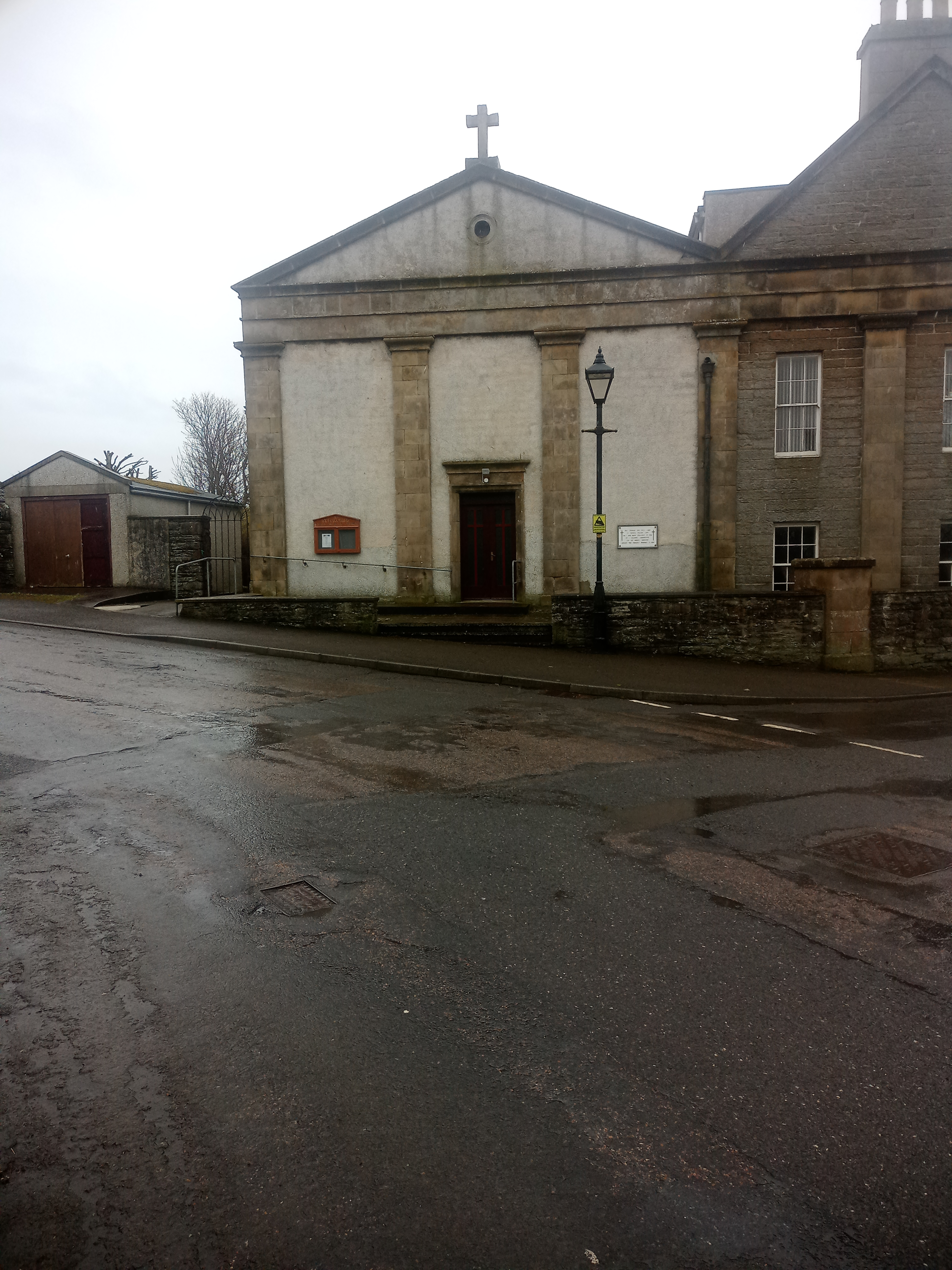
- St Joachim's Church, Wick
- Address: St Joachim's Catholic Church, Breadalbane Terrace, Wick, Caithness
- Country: Scotland
- Denomination: Catholic

History
- Dedication: Joachim

Architecture
- Architect(s): Walter Lovi and William Robertson

Administration
- Diocese: Aberdeen
- Parish: St Anne's and St Joachim's

Clergy
- Priest: Fr Colin Davies

St Joachim's Church is a Category B listed Roman Catholic church in Wick, Scotland.

== History ==
There was no significant Catholic congregation in Wick for centuries following the Scottish Reformation, until the early 19th century when the herring industry attracted seasonal workers from Ireland for six weeks in summer each year. In 1832, the Vicar Apostolic to Scotland's Northern Region, James Kyle, sent the Edinburgh-born Father Walter Lovi to minister to the migrant community. Lovi initially faced considerable hostility from the local population due to sectarian prejudice, and struggled to rent a space to hold Mass. However, his personal ministry to the sick during a cholera outbreak that year - and his role in persuading most of the Catholic labourers to remain in Wick throughout, saving the town from an economic disaster - won him a great deal of goodwill, and he was given vacant land on which to build a church. For the next four years, Lovi raised funds for the church's construction, which was completed in 1836; he left the town not long afterwards. Continuing local anti-Catholicism necessitated the construction of large iron gates around the church, which were eventually removed in 1971.

In 1860, and for six years thereafter, St Joachim's was the administrative centre of the Arctic Mission. It was at this point that the church began to attract a permanent, rather than a seasonal, congregation. In 1861, the church was consecrated to St Joachim, father of the Virgin Mary, by Stephan de Djun Kooskoy, Synod Prefect of the Arctic Regions, due in part to his personal dedication to the saint and in part to St Joachim's feast day falling during the herring season.

The congregation dwindled during the following decades, and Wick ceased again to have a resident priest, until the 1920s which saw significant Italian Catholic immigration. The construction of the nuclear installations at Dounreay in 1955 led to another large wave of immigration to both Wick and the nearby town of Thurso. Another church was built in Thurso to serve the congregation there, as part of the same parish; it was completed in 1960 and dedicated to St Anne, the wife of St Joachim. The Thurso congregation, nearer to Dounreay, soon outnumbered that at Wick, and the priest moved to Thurso.

== Ministry ==
Today, in addition to St Anne's and St Joachim's, the parish includes a chapel in Talmine. The parish priest, Father Colin Davies, also serves as parish priest for the parish of Our Lady and St Joseph's in Orkney, and says Mass at the Italian Chapel on Lamb Holm on the first Sunday of months during the tourist season.

Mass is said at St Joachim's at 5:30pm on Saturday, and St Anne's at 9:45am on Sunday.
