= A'bunadh =

Scottish single malt whisky

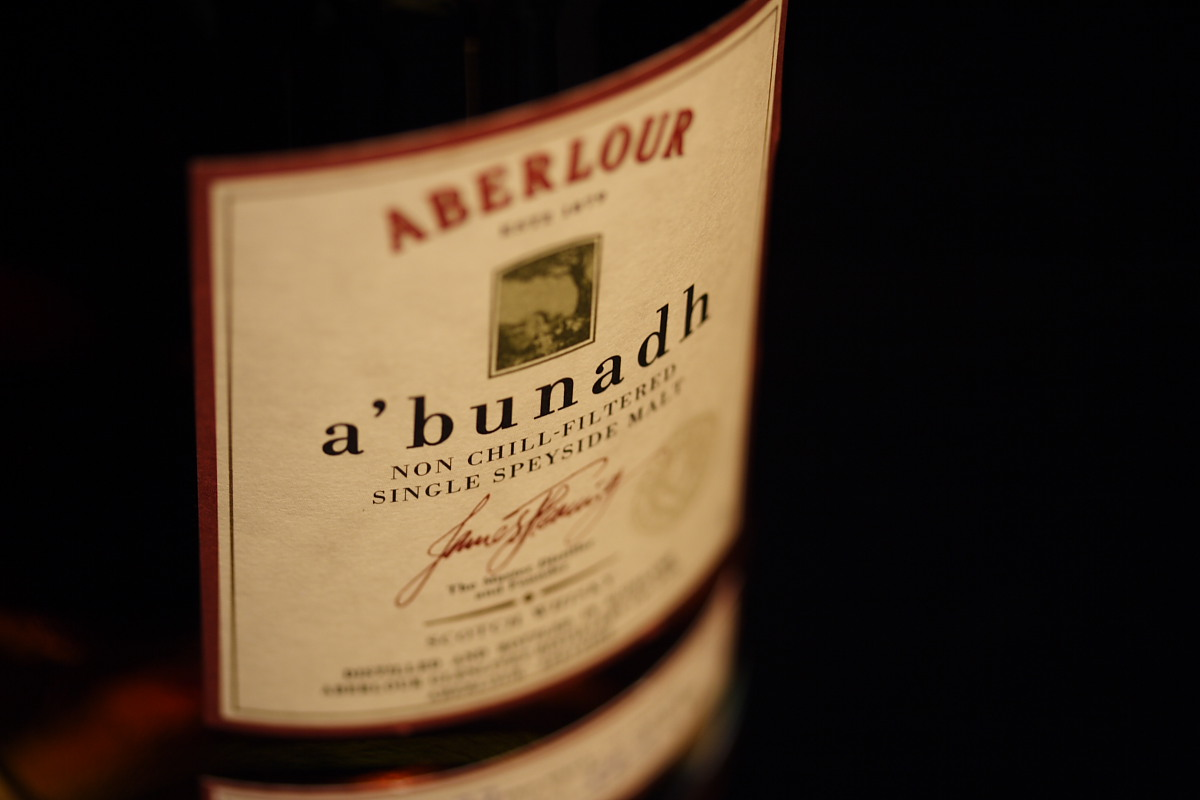
A'bunadh from Batch No. 22

A'bunadh is a cask-strength single malt whisky from the Aberlour Distillery in Scotland. Though it has no age statement, it is released in limited run batches, each batch carrying a unique number on its label.

A'bunadh is exclusively aged in Spanish oak Oloroso sherry butts and therefore has a sweeter, softer flavour than most scotch. A'bunadh is not chill filtered.

The distillery cite the story during distillery tours that when the second pair of stills were put in during 1975, a time capsule was discovered behind the name plate, containing an 1898 newspaper about the distillery fire wrapped around an 1898 bottle of Aberlour. The workmen who discovered the bottle polished off four fifths of the bottle during their lunch break, but the remains of the bottle went off to the laboratories in Keith, Moray, and were analysed. A'bunadh is an attempt to recreate this single malt.

The name a'bunadh is described as the Scottish Gaelic for 'the original', though is possibly a misspelling of am bunadh, meaning 'the origin'.

== Released batch numbers ==
Batch number	Alcohol by volume (ABV)	Approximate year of bottling
1–5	59.6%	1997
6	59.9%	1999
Silver Label (12yo)	58.7%	1999
7	59.9%	2000
8	60.2%	2001
9	60%	2002
10	59.8%	2003
11	59.8%	2003
12	60%	2004
13	59.8%	2004
14	59.5%	2005
15	59.6%	2005
16	59.6%	2005
17	60.2%	2006
18	59.7%	2006
19	59.9%	2007
20	60.5%	2007
21	59.5%	2008
22	59.3%	2008
23	60.2%	2008
24	60.2%	2008
25	60.4%	2008
26	60.6%	2009
27	60.1%	2009
28	59.7%	2009
29	59.9%	2010
30	59.8%	2010
31	60.5%	2010
32	60.4%	2010
33	60.9%	2010
34	59.5%	2010
35	60.3%	2011
36	60.1%	2011
37	59.6%	2011
38	60.3%	2011
39	59.8%	2012
40	60.0%	2012
41	59.0%	2012
42	60.3%	2012
44	59.7%	2012
45	60.2%	2013
46	60.4%	2013
47	60.7%	2014
48	59.7%	2014
49	60.1%	2014
50	59.6%	2014
51	60.8%	2015
52	60.5%	2015
53	59.7%	2015
54	60.7%	2016
55	60.9%	2016
56	61.2%	2016
57	60.7%	2016
58	61.1%	2017
59	60.9%	2017
60	60.3%	2017
61	60.8%	2017
62	59.9%	2018
63	61.0%	2018
64	59.9%	2019
65	59.5%	2019
66	59.2%	2019
67	59.8%	2020
68	61.5%	2020
69	61.2%	2021
70	61.2%	2021
71	61.5%	2021
72	59.1%	2021
73	61.2%	2022
74	60.0%	2022
75	60.9%	2022
76	61.3%	2022
77	60.8%	2023
78	60.7%	2023
79	60.5%	2023
80	61.0%	2023
81	61.6%	2024
82	61.2%	2024
83	59.5%	2024
