= Victoria Bridge, Aberlour =

Footbridge near Aberlour in Scotland

Victoria Bridge
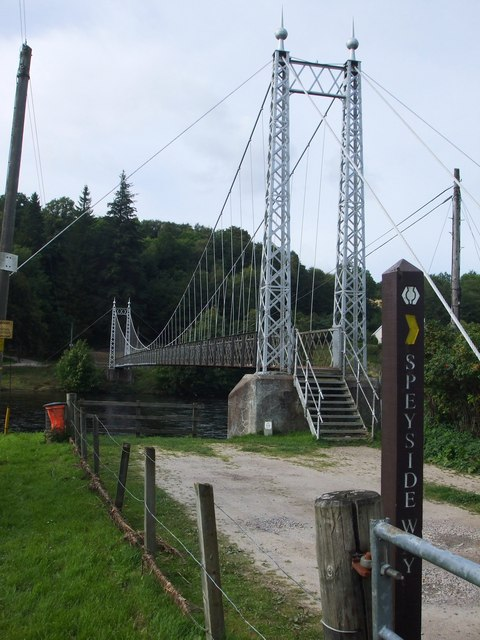
- Coordinates: 57.47039°N 3.23168°W
- Carries: Pedestrians
- Crosses: River Spey
- Locale: Aberlour
- Other name: The Penny Bridge

Characteristics
- Material: Iron, steel
- Longest span: 287 feet (87 m)

History
- Designer: James Abernethy
- Opened: 1902

Listed Building – Category A
- Official name: Victoria Bridge Over River Spey
- Designated: 13 October 1986
- Reference no.: LB20873

Location
- Interactive map of Victoria Bridge

The Victoria Bridge is a suspension footbridge near the village of Aberlour in Moray, Scotland. It was built in 1902, replacing a ferry that had previously been in service there, and is now a Category A listed building.

== Description ==
The Victoria Bridge is a long, narrow suspension footbridge, situated to the west of Aberlour in Moray and spanning the River Spey. Its lattice truss walkway is suspended from wire rope cables with a diameter of 2 inches (5.1 cm). These are supported by tapering, latticed iron pylons, with ball and spike finials. It has a span of 287 feet (87 m) between its supporting towers.

== History ==
Prior to the bridge's construction, a ferry carried passengers across the Spey at Aberlour. Local philanthropist James Fleming - banker, county councillor, Provost, and founder of Aberlour distillery - saw a need for a safer pedestrian footbridge across the often dangerous fast-flowing waters. In June 1895, just before his death, Fleming made a bequest in his Will: "I leave a sum of five hundred pounds for the purpose of erecting a steel wire footbridge over the river Spey at Aberlour, at a place as near as possible to the mouth of the burn of Ruthrie [Lour Burn] so as to connect the village of Charlestown with the parish of Knockando, if the Proprietor of Elchies will consent thereto and if they obtain his consent I direct my Trustees to expend the said sum accordingly, but in the event of the Proprietor declining or not giving his consent within three years after my death then the said sum to fall into and form part of the residue of my means and estate." Obtaining permission from the Proprietor was difficult. A stinging criticism published in 1899 showed the depth of feeling amongst many local people: "The Laird of Elchies is making a bold bid to become the most unpopular proprietor on Speyside. He has refused to grant a site for a bridge pier on the west side of the Spey. A respectful letter was addressed to him by three gentlemen representing the parish Councils of Aberlour, Knockando and the Police Commissioners of the village of Aberlour The laird of etches not only refused to grant a site for the pier, but he did so in language not likely to add to his popularity. It will be remembered that a short time ago two men lost their lives at the ferry by the boat capsizing. That fatal accident in itself ought to have been sufficient to remove any objection which might linger in the mind of the Laird of Elchies, but human life does not appear to count for much with that young man."

Eventually permission was granted, and on Christmas Eve 1901 the Banffshire Journal & General Advertiser reported: We believe that Aberlour people are to have the bridge across the Spey at last. Mr Grant of Elchies exhibited the plan of the bridge to some gentlemen in the village before he left for London... It is to cost about £1,000 and will be erected, it is expected, next spring or early summer. Messrs. Abernethy & Co., Aberdeen, are the engineers. Besides the £500 left by the late Mr. Fleming it is generally believed that Mrs. Fleming most generously is giving the balance of extra cost. Mr Grant of Elchies is taking charge of the whole matter.

It is sometimes referred to as The Penny Bridge, as there was originally a toll of one penny to cross.

A later newspaper report in 1902 explained: "the bridge is completed but has not yet been formally handed over by the engineers, and it is understood that there is to be no opening ceremony. Meantime Mr Grant of Elchies has a gate erected at the Elchies side to collect a toll of 1d [a penny] for crossing, but we hope better counsels may prevail, and that he may yet see his way to depart from this imposition. Meantime we are pleased to see the bridge erected as a safe means of passage over the river, and the thanks of the community on both sides of the river will be heartily given to the kind lady who has had the wishes of her late husband so amply fulfilled."

The bridge was designated a Category B listed building in 1986, and upgraded to Category A shortly afterwards in 1987.

== See also ==
- List of bridges in Scotland
