= Ethyl palmitate =

Names
- Preferred IUPAC name Ethyl hexadecanoate

Identifiers
CAS Number	628-97-7
3D model (JSmol)	Interactive image
ChemSpider	11860
ECHA InfoCard	100.010.059
PubChem CID	12366
UNII	IRD3M534ZM
CompTox Dashboard (EPA)	DTXSID2047511
- InChI: InChI=1S/C18H36O2/c1-3-5-6-7-8-9-10-11-12-13-14-15-16-17-18(19)20-4-2/h3-17H2,1-2H3
- SMILES: CCCCCCCCCCCCCCCC(=O)OCC

Properties
Chemical formula	C_{18}H_{36}O_{2}
Molar mass	284.484 g·mol^{−1}
Appearance	Colorless crystals or liquid
Odor	Wax-like
Melting point	22–26 °C (72–79 °F; 295–299 K)
Boiling point	377–378 °C (711–712 °F; 650–651 K)
Solubility in water	Insoluble

Hazards
- Occupational safety and health (OHS/OSH)
Main hazards	Irritant
NFPA 704 (fire diamond)	1 1 0
Flash point	110 °C (230 °F; 383 K)
Safety data sheet (SDS)	MSDS
- Except where otherwise noted, data are given for materials in their standard state (at 25 °C [77 °F], 100 kPa). Infobox references

Ethyl palmitate is an organic compound with the chemical formula C_{18}H_{36}O_{2}. It is a colorless solid with a wax-like odor. Chemically, ethyl palmitate is the ethyl ester of palmitic acid.

Ethyl hexadecanoate is produced in aged whiskey, and is sometimes removed from the final product via chill filtering. Ethyl palmitate is used as a hair- and skin-conditioning agent.
