= James William Grant (astronomer) =

Scottish astronomer

- Born: August 13, 1788; Wester Elchies, Moray, Scotland
- Died: September 13, 1865 (aged 77); Wester Elchies, Moray, Scotland
- Known for: Discovering Antares B

James William Grant FRSE FRAS, 3rd Laird of Wester Elchies (1788–1865) was a Scottish astronomer and landowner. On 23 July 1844 he was the first person to observe and record the existence of the star Antares B.

== Life ==
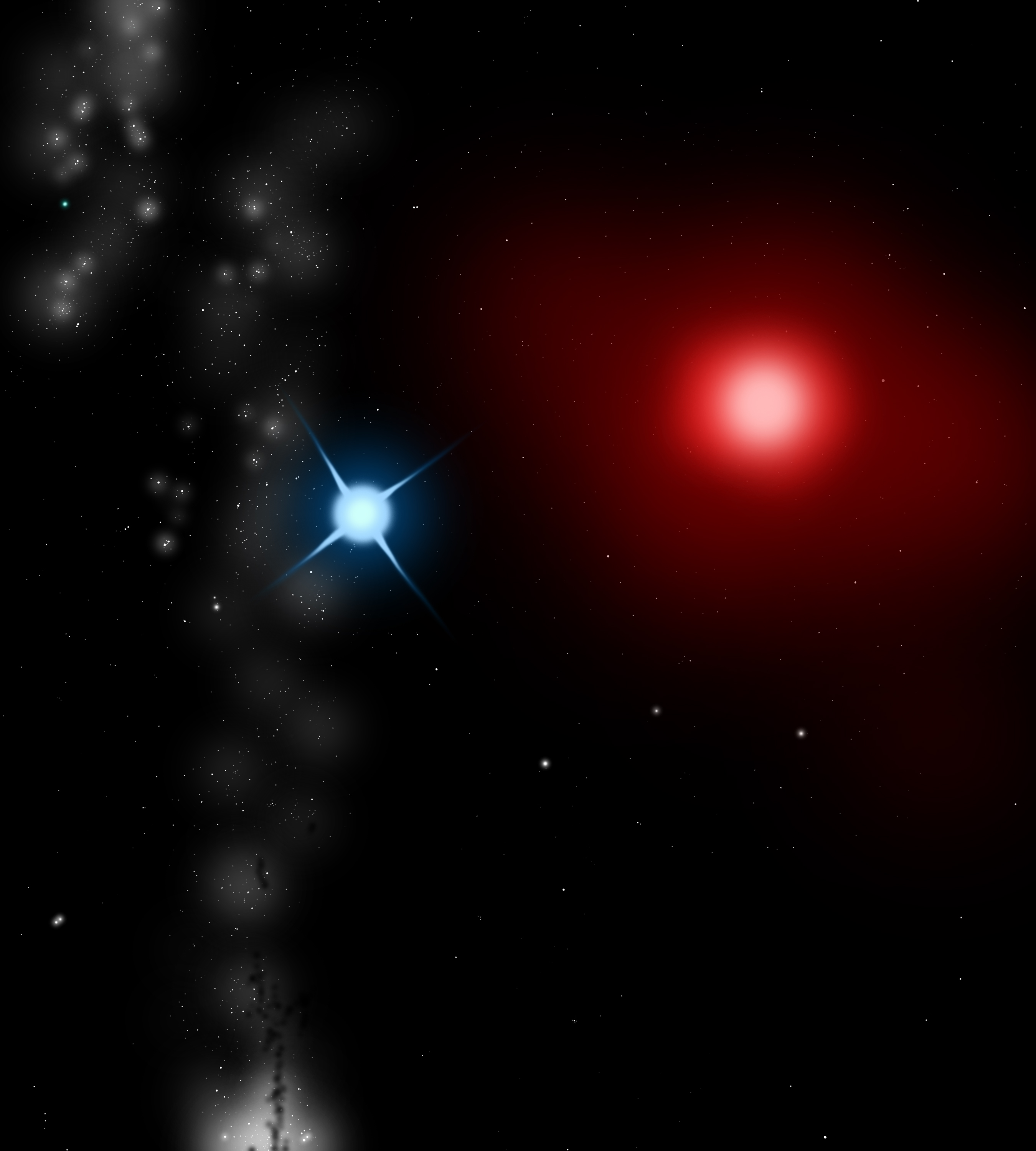
Illustration of Antares and its companion star, Antares B

He was born on 13 August 1788 at the family home of Wester Elchies and was baptised on 28 August 1788 at Knockando church. He was the son of Robert Grant, Laird of Elchies, Knockando and Ballintomb (1720–1803), and his wife Isobel Campbell (born 1760). His father had made a fortune as a fur trader in Canada, purchasing the estate of Wester Elchies in 1783.

From 1805 until 1849 he worked for the East India Company, beginning in the role of Writer and rising to be its official Astronomer, based in Bengal. In 1828 he inherited the estate of Wester Elchies from his elder brother. In 1849, he returned to Scotland and built a private observatory from granite at Wester Elchies, flanked by a pair of sphinx. In 1851 he purchased the Trophy Telescope which had been a centrepiece of the Great Exhibition of 1851 at the Crystal Palace in London. It was set up specifically to search for double stars. It was used by Prof Piazzi Smyth in 1862. It was sold in 1864 to a Mr Aytoun of Glenfarg. The telescope was the largest in Scotland at that time with an 11-inch aperture (280mm), 16 feet (4.88m) focal length lens.

In 1852 he was elected a Fellow of the Royal Society of Edinburgh, his proposer being Robert Morrison. He resigned in 1854.

He died on September 13, 1865 at Wester Elchies. He is buried in the family vault at Knockando churchyard.

== Family ==
On 22 November 1807 he married Margaret Wilson (1791–1855) at Knockando. She was the daughter of Rev Thomas Wilson of Gamrie (1743–1830) in Banffshire. Margaret died in London and is buried in Kensal Green Cemetery. Children:

- William Grant (1 August 1809, Calcutta – 8 August 1877, Strathspey, Scotland),
- Maynard Eliza Grant (m. James Thomason) (4 March 1811, Calcutta – 8 November 1839, Kensington),
- Isabella Charlotte Grant (m. Robert Grant) (28 February 1812, Calcutta – 4 August 1897, Wester Tambrick, Morayshire, Scotland),
- Lenora Margaret Hamilton Grant (7 June 1817, Knockando – 14 September 1890),
- Mary Ballard Grant (20 January 1819, Knockando – 29 April 1891, Morayshire, Scotland),
- Julia Sherer Grant (m. Rev. Frank Parks) (2 October 1820, Knockando -?),
- James William Grant (4 March 1822, Knockando -14 June 1822, Calcutta),
- Charles Thomason Petrie Grant (2 December 1824, Knockando) – prior to 1877), (Note: No record has been found for Charles' death, but it is likely that he died prior to his brother William's 1877 death, since when William died Wester Elchies passed to his youngest brother, Henry.)
- Helen Bradden Grant (26 December 1825, Malda City – 1872),
- Henry Alexander Grant (23 January 1827, Knockando – 7 July 1886, Knockando)
- Emily Forbes Grant (m. Philip Kearney MacGregor Skinner) (20 July 1829, Knockando – 18 April 1875, Cheltenham)

His grandson James W H Grant was son-in-law to Sir Archibald Levin Smith who is also buried at Knockando.

== Honours, decorations, awards and distinctions ==
Fellow of the Royal Society of Edinburgh from 1852 to 1854
Fellow of the Royal Astronomical Society from 1854
