= Dorothy K. Haynes =

Dorothy Kate Haynes (1918 – December 1987) was a Scottish horror and supernatural writer. She frequently wrote articles for The Scotsman, and had much of her work published in ghost and horror anthologies.

== Biography ==
Haynes was born in 1918 and spent her childhood with her twin brother Leonard, in Aberlour Orphanage, Banffshire. Later Haynes moved to Lanark, where she married John S. Gray (who was also a former Aberlour Orphanage resident — see: Haste Ye Back). She had 4 children — Alison, Micheal, Leonard and Ian, with the first two dying from cystic fibrosis.

Haynes worked extensively in support of Girl Guides movement and remained involved with Aberlour Orphanage until its closure. She published the autobiographical novel Haste Ye Back in 1973 in memory of her time there.

She was diagnosed with breast cancer, and died in December 1987.

== Selected works ==
=== Novels ===
- Winter's Traces (1947)
- Robin Ritchie (1949)
- Haste Ye Back (1973)
- The Gay Goshawk (1992)

=== Collections ===
- Thou Shall Not Suffer a Witch (1949; expanded edition 1996)
- Peacocks and Pagodas (1981)

=== Short stories ===
- Thou Shalt Not Suffer a Witch... (1947)
- The Derelict Track (1971)
- The Peculiar Case of Mrs Grimmond (1973)
- Scots Wha Ha'e (1975)
- Barleyriggs (1976)
- Up, Like a Good Girl (1976)
- King of the Fair (1979)
- Those Lights and Violins (1979)
- A Song at the Party (1980)
- The Boorees (1981)
- Help the Railway Mission (1981)
- A Horizon of Obelisks (1981)
- A Lady in the Night (1983)
- Oblige Me with a Loaf (1983)
- The 'Bean-Nighe'
- The Cure
- The Man Who Went Too Far
- Zelma, My Sister-In-Law
