= Walker's Shortbread =

Scottish food manufacturer

Walker's Shortbread Ltd.

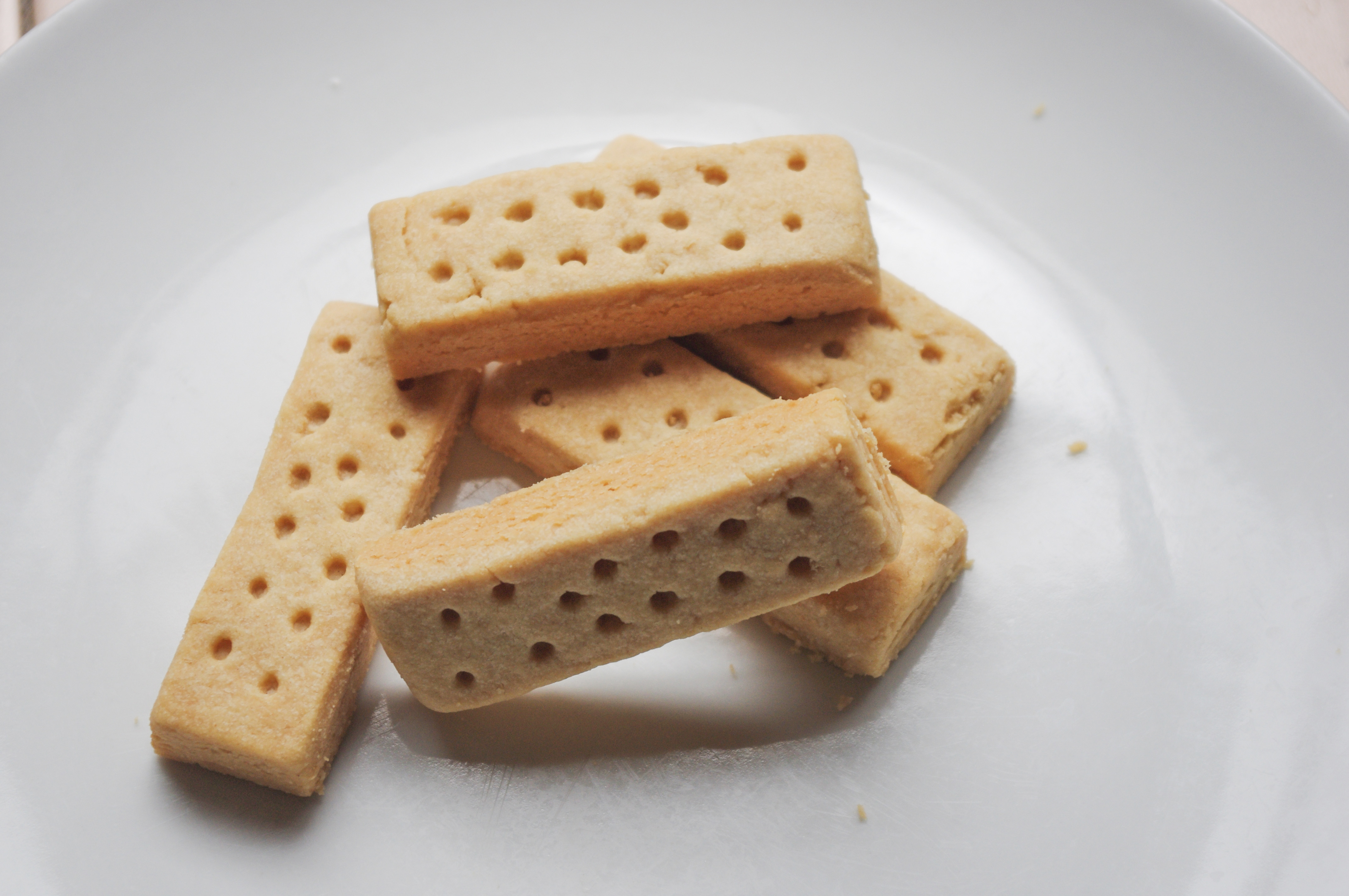
- Walker's Shortbread biscuits
- Type: Private
- Industry: Baked goods
- Founded: 1898; 128 years ago in Torphins, Scotland
- Founder: Joseph Walker
- Headquarters: Aberlour House; Aberlour, Scotland
- Area served: Worldwide
- Products: Shortbread, biscuits, cookies, and crackers
- Revenue: £184 million (2023)
- Number of employees: 1,500 (2023)
- Website: walkersshortbread.com

Walker's Shortbread Ltd. (formerly Walkers) is a Scottish manufacturer of shortbread, biscuits, cookies, and crackers. The shortbread is baked in the Moray village of Aberlour, following a recipe developed by Joseph Walker in 1898.

The company is one of Scotland's biggest exporters of food, and employs over 1,200 people. It is sold in tartan packaging all over the world.

== History ==
The business was founded by Joseph Walker in the village of Aberlour, Speyside, in 1898. It quickly started producing shortbread. During the 1930s, two of Walkers' sons – James and Joseph – joined the family business. By 1936 they had purchased a van to allow for delivery of Walker's products outside of the local area. Joseph Walker, the founder, died in 1954 and passed the company to his children. By 1961, all three of James Walkers' children were also working for the firm. By 1970, the company had expanded to almost 100 employees, 14 vans, and two additional shops in the nearby towns of Elgin and Grantown-on-Spey. It had also expanded its baking operations in the store and its products could be found in British fine food stores. During the 1970s, the company would begin exporting to over 60 countries and by 1975 the company had opened its own factory.

The company started producing oaten biscuits for Duchy Originals in 1992, having been approached the previous year.

The profits of Walker's Shortbread, which is also still owned and managed by the Walker family, were diminished by a global increase in the price of butter in 2018 by around 50% due to supply shortages and demand increases, resulting in the company seeing a 60% drop in operating profit. In 2023 the firm employed 1,500 staff and had a turnover of £184 million.

The company rebranded in 2020, changing its name to Walker's Shortbread Ltd. It announced it was exploring how to create a vegan version of the butter-based biscuit in 2024.

== Locations ==
The Walker's Shortbread headquarters is located in Aberlour House, Aberlour with a production site in Elgin.

== See also ==
- List of shortbread biscuits and cookies
- Scottish cuisine
