= William Robertson (Scottish architect) =

Scottish architect (1786–1841)

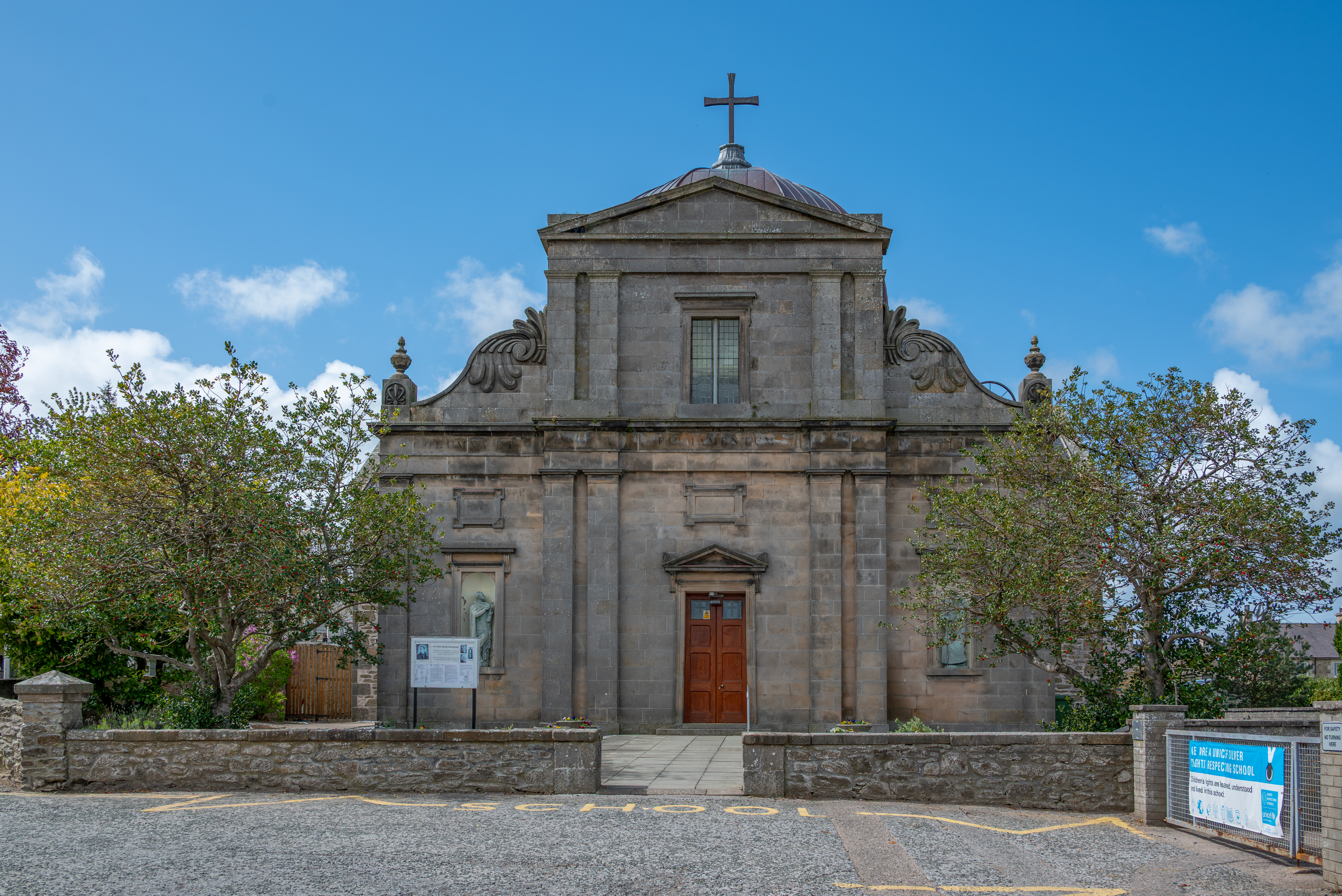
St Thomas's Church in Keith, built by Robertson with Walter Lovi in 1831

William Robertson (1786 – 12 June 1841) was a Scottish architect. Born in Lonmay in Aberdeenshire, he started his career in Cullen, Moray, then moved to Elgin around 1821, where he practised for the rest of his life. He established himself as the foremost architect of his period north of Aberdeen, described by Charles McKean as "possibly the north of Scotland's first native classical architect of substance." His practice was continued by his nephews Alexander and William Reid, and their partners and successors J and W Wittet.

Robertson built numerous churches, for the Church of Scotland, the Episcopal Church of Scotland, and the newly emancipated Roman Catholic Church, including the Category A-listed listed St Thomas's in Keith, which he designed with Walter Lovi. He also improved numerous country houses around Morayshire and Banffshire, such as Milton Brodie House, and he built Aberlour House from scratch for the rich slave-owner and planter Alexander Grant. In 1826, he published a book, entitled A Series of Views of the Ruins of Elgin Cathedral … with ground plan and table of measurements.

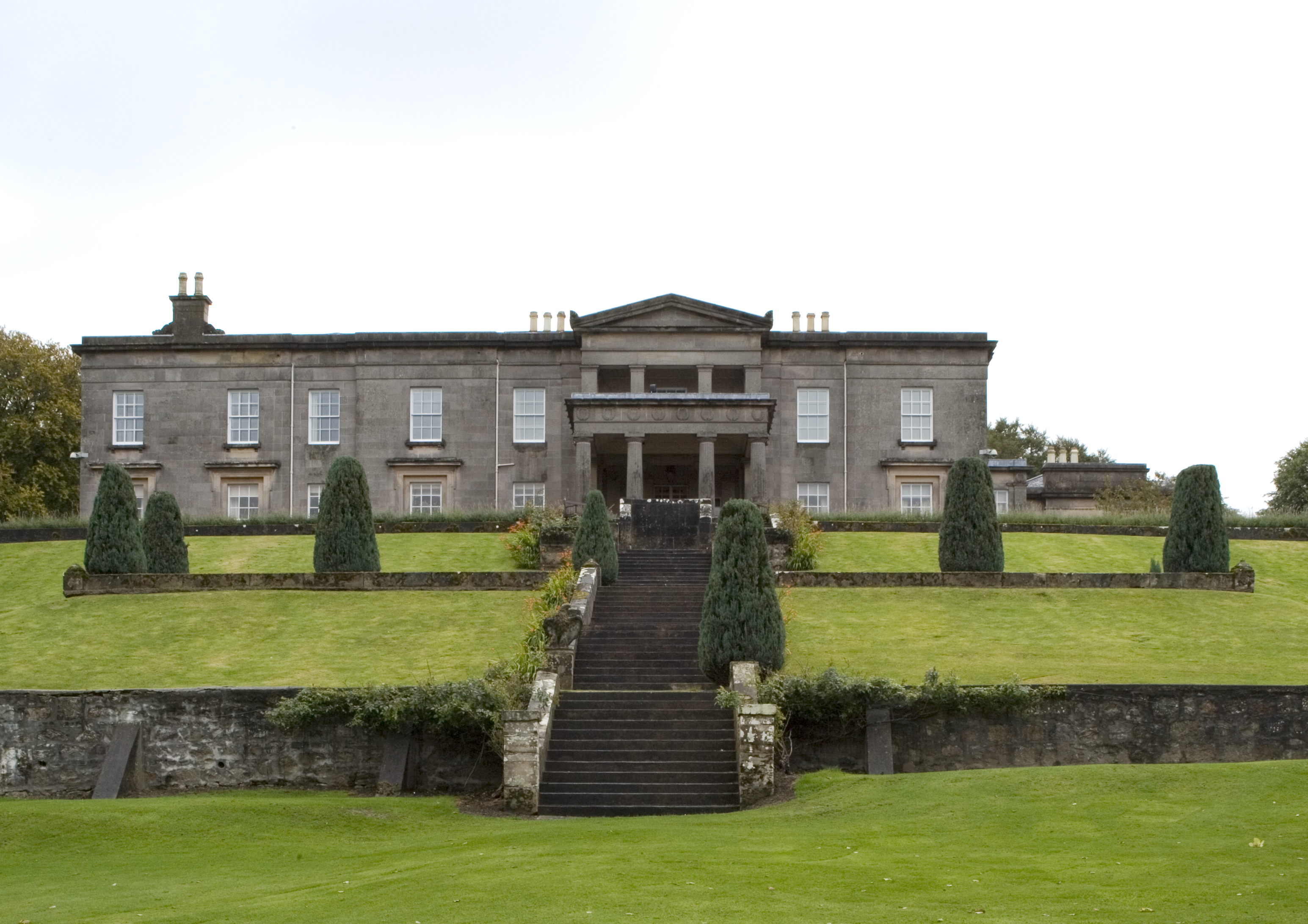
Aberlour House, viewed from the north

He died at Elgin on 12 June 1841 and is commemorated by a memorial in the graveyard at Elgin Cathedral.
