= Aberlour House (building) =

House in Scotland

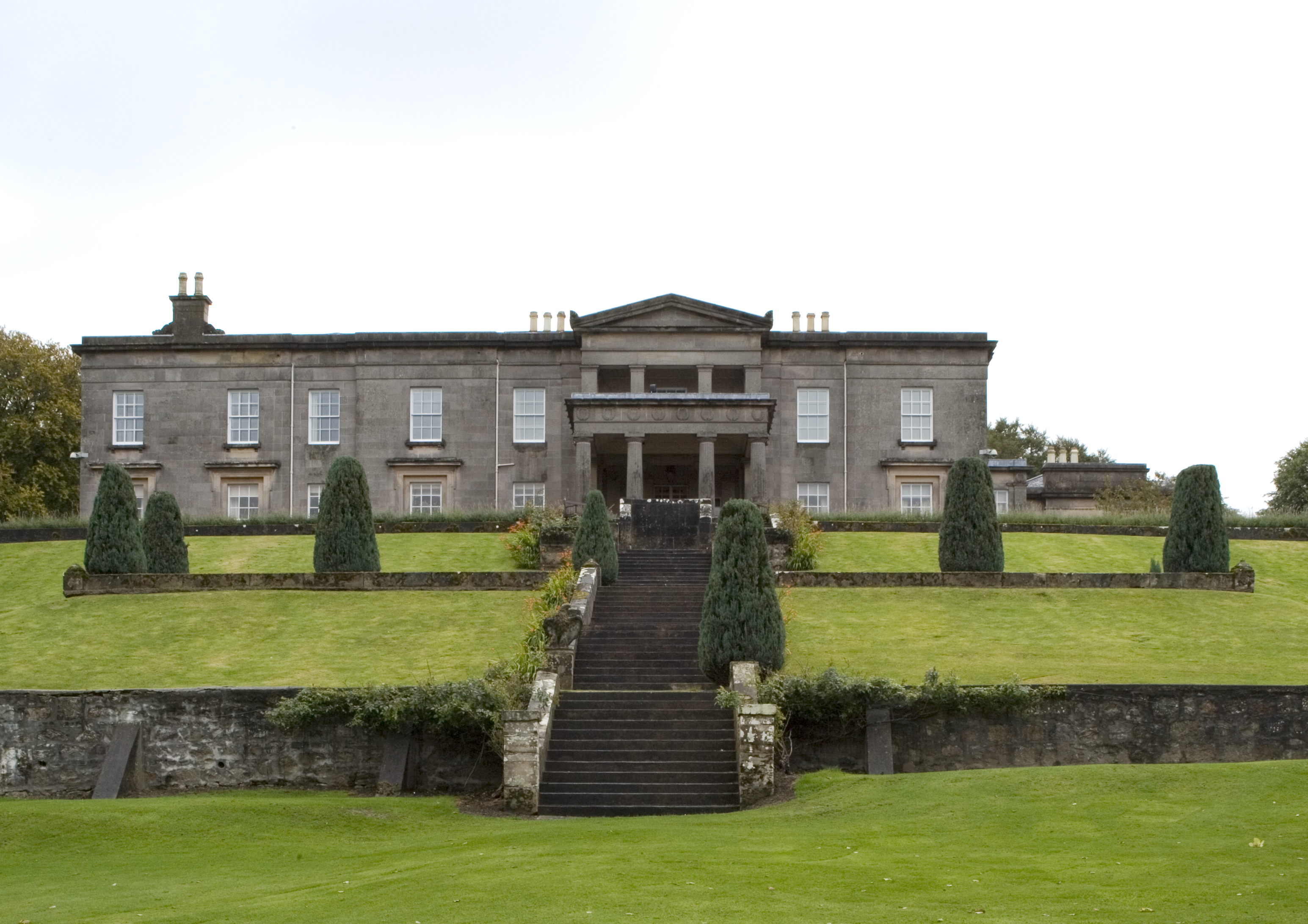

- Location of the Aberlour House in Scotland
- 57°28′37″N 3°12′12″W
- Type: Country House
- Location: Near Aberlour, Moray

History
- Built: 1858
- Built for: Alexander Grant

Site notes
- Architect: William Robertson
- Owner: Walkers Shortbread

Listed Building – Category B
- Designated: 1972
- Delisted: 1987
- Reference no.: LB2349

Listed Building – Category A
- Designated: 1987
- Reference no.: LB2349

Aberlour House is a country house near Aberlour in Moray, Scotland. It was built in 1838 by William Robertson for Alexander Grant, planter and merchant from Aberlour, after his return to the UK. His niece, Margaret Macpherson Grant, lived in it after Grant died, and it was later home to John Ritchie Findlay of The Scotsman newspaper and his descendants. It was requisitioned for military use during the Second World War, and after the war was sold for use as a preparatory school for Gordonstoun. The school was later moved into Gordonstoun's estate, and the building was sold to Walkers Shortbread, who restored and renovated it, and now use it as their head office. It has been designated a Category A listed building.

== Description ==
Aberlour House, the only country house that William Robertson built from scratch, has been described by Charles McKean and Walker and Woodworth as his "masterpiece". Its main block presents a two-storey, five bay north-facing frontage, with a porte-cochère projecting from the central entrance supported by doric columns, and with the outer two bays slightly advanced. On the western flank, there is a bay window, and behind that a large single-storey wing; on the east side, there is a two-storey, three-bay drawing room extension, continuous with the main frontage, similar in style to the original front but resulting in an asymmetrical appearance that Walker and Woodworth describe as being out of character with Robertson's work.

=== Interior ===
A low entrance hall leads into a large stair hall that extends to the full height of the building, with a cantilevered stairway with ionic newel posts leading to the upper floor, and a coffered ceiling with gilded detailing. Opposite the entrance hall is a drawing room, with a red marble chimneypiece that is original to the building. To the north west is a wood-panelled library, originally the dining fool, also with a coffered ceiling, and a marble fireplace featuring religious scenes. In the west wing is the cafeteria, which was originally a ballroom.

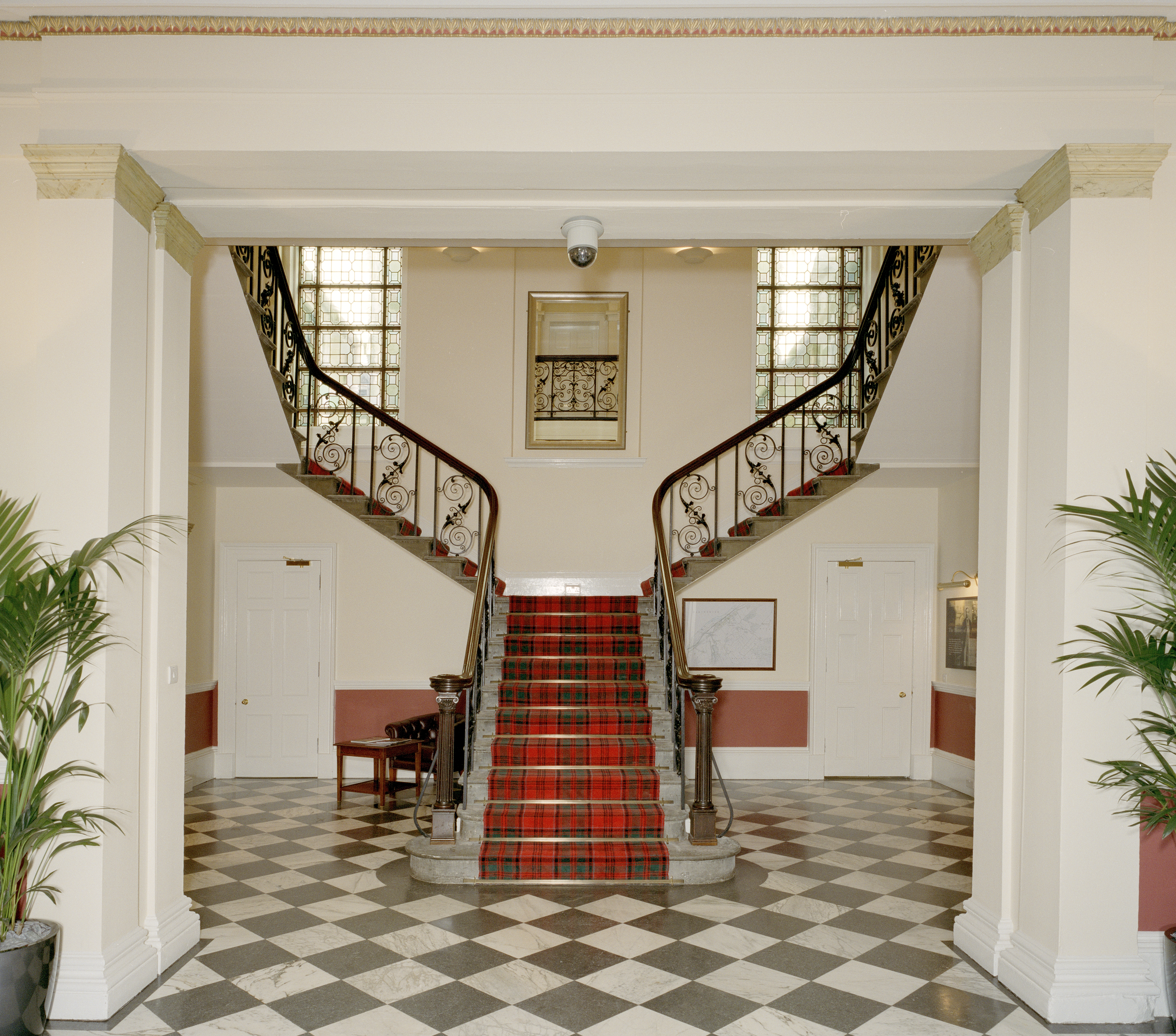
The front hall of Aberlour House

=== Grounds ===
To the north front of the house is a terrace, created by Peddie & Kinnear, which is accessed from the lawn below by a stone staircase. Further to the north is a Tuscan column, created by Robertson and nearly 20 metres (70 ft) in height; this originally had a spherical granite finial, but now supports a heraldic unicorn bearing the letter 'F', representing the Findlay family.

About 250 metres to the south-east of the building is a caravan park. This was originally a walled garden, laid out by Robertson; its pedimented north gate, built in 1858, comprises a round arch, whose keystone bears the initials MG, in reference to Margaret Macpherson Grant who was the owner of the property at the time. Its south gate, built by Lorimer in 1893, has tall piers with pineapple finials, and its arch is emblazoned with the words "Here shall ye see no enemy but winter and rough weather" and separately "Be ye wise as serpents and harmless as doves".

In 1825, a distillery was founded on the grounds by the laird, James Gordon, and a man named Peter Weir. When this venture failed in 1833, it was taken over by John & James Grant in partnership with two brothers by the last name of Walker. The lease ended in 1840, and the Grants (along with Peter Weir's son), went to Rothes and built Glen Grant distillery, and the Walker brothers went to Linkwood distillery.

== History ==
Aberlour House was built between 1838 and 1839 for Alexander Grant, who had been born near Aberlour but had travelled to Jamaica where he had made a substantial fortune before to returning to the UK at some point in the 1820s. It is unlikely that he ever actually lived in the house, due to his continuing business interests in London, but it was considered his principal residence from 1838 until his death in 1854.

Upon Grant's death, Aberlour House, along with his estates in Scotland and Jamaica, passed to Margaret Macpherson Grant. She set about a series of improvements to the house, including the expansion of the servant quarters to allow the ballroom to be added, and the addition of the porte-cochère to the front of the building and the bay window on its west face. This work was conducted by A & W Reid, nephews of William Robertson, who continued his Elgin practice after his death in 1841. The house was damaged by a fire that broke out in 1875; the cause of the fire is unknown, but Macpherson Grant had to be rescued from it.

When Macpherson Grant died in 1877, her estate was contested, but it was determined that it should pass to the Proctor family, who were cousins of hers. Unable to maintain the estate, the Proctors sold it in 1885 to John Ritchie Findlay, a partner of The Scotsman newspaper. He employed Kinnear & Peddie to work on the house and grounds between 1885 and 1887, and Robert S. Lorimer to make further improvements between 1890 and 1893.

The building was requisitioned for military use during the Second World War, when it was used as the headquarters for the 51st (Scottish) Division. The Findlay family retained the building until 1947, when it was sold to serve as Aberlour House (school), a preparatory school for Gordonstoun. It was used in this way until 2004, when the school was absorbed into Gordonstoun's campus, and the building was sold to Walkers Shortbread for use as their head office. Walkers engaged the Ashley Bartlam Partnership to renovate the building, between 2006 and 2010; their work on the building was described by Walker and Woodworth as "beautifully" done.

Aberlour House was designated a Category B listed building in 1972; it was upgraded to Category A 1987.
