= Findhorn (disambiguation) =

Findhorn may refer to:

- Toponyms re northern Scotland:
  - Findhorn, village
  - Findhorn Bay
  - River Findhorn
- Institutions connected with the village
  - Findhorn Foundation, an intentional community
  - Findhorn Press, a publisher founded by the Findhorn Foundation, now an imprint of Inner Traditions – Bear & Company
  - Findhorn Ecovillage
- Other:
  - HMS Findhorn (K301), a ship of the Royal Navy
  - Viscount Stuart of Findhorn
