= Findhorn Viaduct =

Findhorn Viaduct is the name given to two separate railway bridges that cross the River Findhorn in Scotland:

- Findhorn Viaduct (Tomatin) near Tomatin in the Scottish Highlands
- Findhorn Viaduct (Forres) near Forres in Moray, Scotland
