= Sir Alexander Grant, 1st Baronet =

Scottish businessman and philanthropist (1864–1937)

Sir Alexander Grant Bt
- Born: 1 October 1864; Forres, Moray, Scotland
- Died: 21 May 1937 (aged 72); Edinburgh, Scotland
- Resting place: Forres, Scotland
- Occupations: Businessman, biscuit manufacturer and philanthropist
- Known for: Creator of the McVitie's digestive biscuit
- Successor: Robert Grant, 2nd Baronet (son)
- Spouse: Elizabeth Norris (m. 31 July 1887)
- Children: 2 daughters, 1 son
- Honours: Freedom of the City of Edinburgh (1923); Freeman of Forres (1924); Honorary LL.D. University of Edinburgh (1924); Freeman of Nairn (1932)

Sir Alexander Grant, 1st Baronet (1 October 1864 – 21 May 1937) was a Scottish businessman, biscuit manufacturer and philanthropist. He was managing director of McVitie and Price Ltd., developed the recipe of the McVitie's digestive biscuit, and gave an endowment of £200,000 to help establish the National Library of Scotland.

== Early life ==
Grant was born on 1 October 1864 in Forres, the eldest son of Elizabeth Grant (née Norrie) and Peter Grant (1838–1882), a guard with the Highland Railway service. He attended school at Forres Academy, and after his father's death he began training in a legal office, however unhappy in this work he changed profession and became an apprentice with a baker in Forres.

== Career at McVitie's ==
On completing his apprenticeship in Forres, Grant moved to Edinburgh in 1888 taking employment as an assistant at Robert McVitie's basement bakery at 23 to 25 Queensferry Street. In 1892 Grant developed the original recipe for the famous McVitie's digestive biscuit - the recipe remains a secret to this day.

When the company expanded the business to Merchant Street and then on Robertson Avenue, as the St Andrew Biscuit Works factory, Grant was made foreman of the cake department. When that factory burned down in 1894, Grant was sent to Malton in Yorkshire to organise and carry on production at a temporary factory while the premises in Edinburgh were being rebuilt. On returning to Edinburgh later that year, Grant was made manager of the new operation.

In 1902 the business expanded further and Grant oversaw the building of a new factory in Harlesden in north London. When Charles Edward Price retired Grant became the general manager, and on McVitie's death in 1910 he purchased a controlling interest in the business. Grant became managing director in 1911 when the business was registered as limited company.

In 1914 Grant opened a third factory in Manchester which went on to supply the government with iron ration biscuits for the army.

== Philanthropy ==
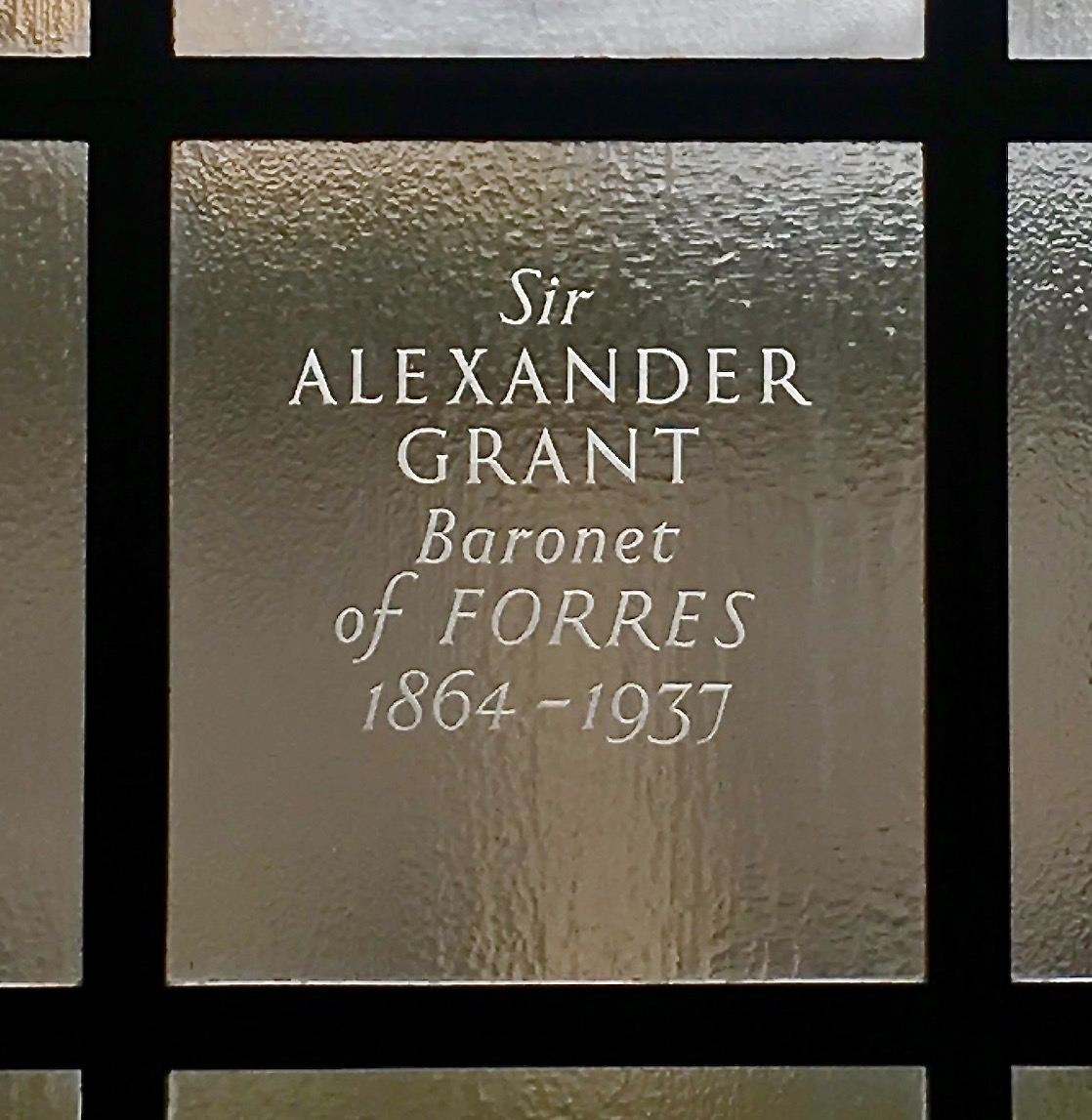
Commemorative glass engraving to Sir Alexander Grant at National Library of Scotland

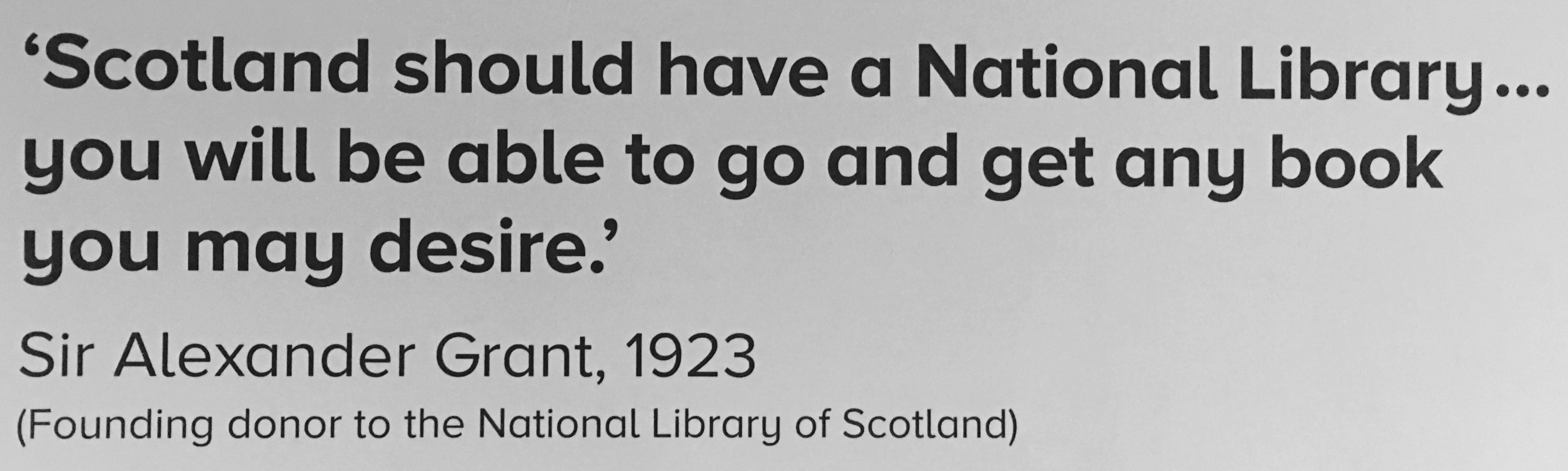

Grant was a generous benefactor, and it was estimated that over his lifetime he gifted more than £750,000 of his own money, often anonymously. In 1923 he gave a permanent endowment of £100,000 to assist the British government in reconstituting The Advocates Library and from it establish the National Library of Scotland. Lord Macmillan, the Chairman of the National Library Committee, said that when Grant's banker handed him the cheque for the endowment it was signed but the amount left blank for Macmillan to complete himself. Grant later made a further contribution of £100,000 to assist with the building of the Library.

He made many donations for developments in his home town of Forres including gifting four windows for the baptistry of Forres Parish Church, designed by Scottish stained glass window artist Douglas Strachan, a new motorised fire engine, and the town's park, Grant Park, named in his honour. He made an interest free loan of £26,000 to the town of Nairn for the town's harbour scheme, and a £5,000 gift for the reconstruction of the public baths. He also made contributions towards developments in Lossiemouth, in particular in support of Lossiemouth golf course.

He supported the University of Edinburgh and gave £50,000 to help clear debts incurred as a result of building development. He gave two gifts of £25,000 to support the building of the University's geology department at Drummond Street.

He was one of the main contributors towards the financing of National War Memorial at Edinburgh Castle, and gave the Palace of Holyrood a 4,000 piece silver banqueting service, linen, cutlery and glassware estimated at a cost of £10,000.

Recognising the burden of debt incurred by the UK as a result of World War I, Grant waived, for 5 years, the interest on the £100,000 of war stock that McVitie's had invested in, netting the Government a saving estimated at £25,000.

One of his anonymous donations, revealed in Lord Macmillan's eulogy for him, was his support of the publication of Sir Walter Scott's letters.

In supporting retired grocers, he made a donation of £5,000 to the Benevolence Fund of the Scottish Federation of Grocers and Provision Merchants' Association.

== Personal life ==
On 31 July 1887 Grant married Elizabeth Norris (d. 28 April 1940) the daughter of Alexander Norris, and together they had two daughters and a son named Robert, born 1894.

He was a lifelong friend of Ramsay MacDonald, the first Labour Party Prime Minister of the United Kingdom. MacDonald, without a private income and traveling by public transport to and from Downing Street, was given a Daimler car by Grant, and a number of McVitie's shares valued at £40,000 to pay for the upkeep of the car. These gifts caused interest in the media and parliament with suggestions that Grant received his baronetcy in return for his gifts.

In the 1924 Birthday Honours he was created a Baronet for public services, and in the same year received an honorary LL.D. degree from the University of Edinburgh. In 1923 Grant was given the freedom of the city of Edinburgh. On 27 August 1932 he was made a freeman of Forres, and his friend Ramsay MacDonald attended the ceremony. He was made a freeman of Nairn in 1932.

After receiving his baronetcy, Grant purchased the 1,500 acres (610 ha) Logie Estate near Dunphail, on the River Findhorn. He renovated the estate, adding further buildings.

Grant was a keen golfer and played regularly on Nairn Links. Grant was a member of the committee that built and opened London's first public golf courses in Richmond Park, which were opened in 1923 and 1925.

After attending the coronation of George VI and Queen Elizabeth on 12 May 1937 Grant fell ill with a chill which developed in to pneumonia. He was attended to by Lord Horder, physician to the King. He died at home at 15 Hermitage Drive in Edinburgh on 21 May 1937. On his death Lord Macmillan said of Grant "He liked to live simply himself, but he liked to give magnificently". He is buried in Forres. His estate was calculated at £1,039,976.

Baronetage of the United Kingdom
New creation	Baronet (of Forres); 1924–1937	Succeeded by Robert McVitie Grant
