= Muckle Spate =

1829 flood in Scotland

- Cause: Heavy rainfall

Meteorological history
- Date: 3 August 1829

Overall effects
- Fatalities: 8
- Areas affected: Strathspey, Scotland

The Muckle Spate was a great flood in August 1829, which devastated much of Strathspey, in the north east of Scotland. Muckle is a Scots word for 'much' or 'great'.

It began raining on the evening of 2 August 1829, and continued into the next day when a thunderstorm broke over the Cairngorms. To the south, the River Dee rose rapidly above its normal level - 15 ft (4.6 m) in places (27 ft at Banchory). The Rivers Nairn, Findhorn, Lossie and Spey were affected, to the north.

== Damage ==
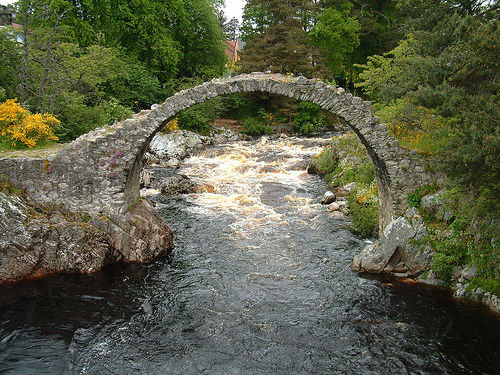
The old bridge at Carrbridge

As well as flooding, many bridges were washed away, including those over the Linn of Dee and Linn of Quoich. The original Mar Lodge was affected. Carrbridge's most famous landmark, the old bridge, built in 1717, from which the village is named, was severely damaged and left in the condition we see today. Homes were lost in Kingston, Moray, a small village on the Moray Firth coast, at the mouth of the River Spey. Five Findhorn fishing boats rescued residents trapped by the floods on the plain of Forres. Across the north-east between six and eight individuals lost their lives, 22 bridges and 60 houses were destroyed and 600 families were made homeless.

The Muckle Spate is remembered in a poem of the same name by David Grant, written circa 1851, describing the effect on the parish of Strachan.

=== River Findhorn ===
The spate was a natural disaster unparalleled in the historic record of the north-east of Scotland described as one of "the most severe catastrophic floods in modern UK history". Based on the eyewitness accounts recorded by Sir Thomas Dick Lauder it has been possible to estimate peak flows down the main river of up to 1,484 m^{3}/s (3,140,000 cu ft/min) and 451 m^{3}/s (960,000 cu ft/min) on its tributary the River Divie. It is at Randolph's Leap that the Findhorn river is at its most spectacular in spate. Here there are two markers indicating the height the river reached in 1829 and it is said that the butler at nearby Relugas caught a salmon 50 feet (15 m) above the normal river level in his umbrella.

== Sources ==
- Lauder, Thomas Dick (1830), An account of the great floods of August 1829 in the province of Moray and adjoining districts, Elgin: R. Stewart
- McKean, Charles (1987), The District of Moray: An Illustrated Architectural Guide, Edinburgh: Scottish Academic Press, ISBN 978-0-7073-0528-8
- McEwen, J Lindsey; Werritty, Alan (January 2007). "The Muckle Spate of 1829: the physical and societal impact of a catastrophic flood on the River Findhorn, Scottish Highlands". Transactions of the Institute of British Geographers. 32 (1): 66–89. doi:10.1111/j.1475-5661.2007.00232.x.
