= Royal Findhorn Yacht Club =

- Founded: 1929
- Based in: Findhorn, Moray
- Website: www.rfyc.co.uk

The Royal Findhorn Yacht Club is located in a waterfront setting at Findhorn, on the coast of Moray in Scotland, on a site overlooking the sheltered inshore waters of Findhorn Bay.

== History ==
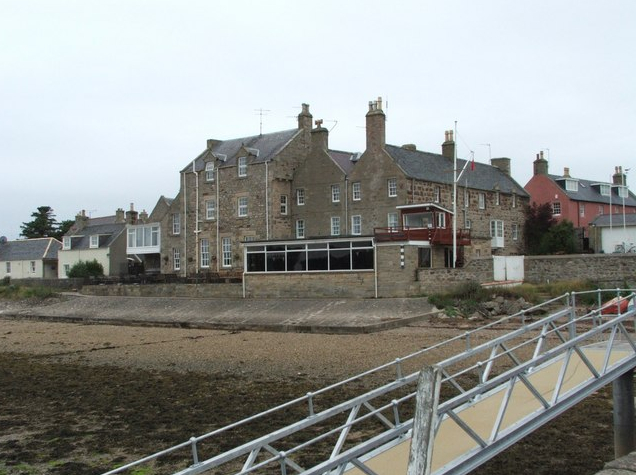
Royal Findhorn Yacht Club and nearby buildings

In the early 1920s there were at least five local commercial yawls that competed in an annual regatta. As the decade progressed, a class of Lymington scows, an 11 ft 3in. long dinghy with a 60 sq ft (5.6 m^{2}). single lug sail was established, competing in regular Saturday sailing events. The first Commodore of Findhorn Yacht Club was James Chadwick and his home was used as the club meeting place. Parts of this building eventually became the current clubhouse.

1930 saw the arrival of the first of the "Findhorn X class" 18 ft (5.5 m). sailing boat, the prototype being constructed in the village for around £80. The X class is reputed to be the forerunner to the National 18 class. By the late nineteen thirties the X class fleet had over 20 boats, before the Second World War led to the cessation of pleasure sailing.

After the war club activities recommenced, and from the late nineteen fifties there was a significant increase in both cruiser and dinghy sailing. In 1971 the Queen approved the use of the prefix "Royal" in the name of the club.

== Facilities ==
The club facilities include a bar and dining room and an equipment/dinghy shed, dinghy park and the two nearby piers.

== Sailing ==
A variety of different dinghy and cruiser sailors make use of the club with racing mainly held in handicap classes. RFYC has an annual Open week held in July that starts with a Regatta weekend and continues as a separate series during the subsequent week.

Every four years, RFYC hosts the UK & Irish National 18 ft Dinghy Championships, with boats coming from Scotland, Ireland, England, Wales, and the Isle of Man. The National 18 fleet has evolved from a heavy clinker built dayboat into a lightly constructed GRP fast dinghy, requiring a crew of three.

== Navigation ==
Findhorn Bay is a large sandy estuary with a narrow entrance that is some 3 kilometres (1.9 mi) wide and long at its greatest extent. Most of the bay dries at low tide but a deep channel from the entrance to the bay leads eastward to the boatyard and then south past the village piers and RFYC premises. There are visitor's moorings and water and electricity is available at the north pier, which dries. The entrance to the bay itself provides navigational challenges. A long sandy bar stretches from east to west making an entrance at lower stages of the tide hazardous if not impossible. Inshore from the bar there is a shallow lagoon, which contains extensive mussel beds. At higher stages of the tide the channel admits larger craft, although the tide race can be strong.
