= Logie House =

House in Moray, Scotland

Coordinates: 57°32′12″N 3°39′40″W

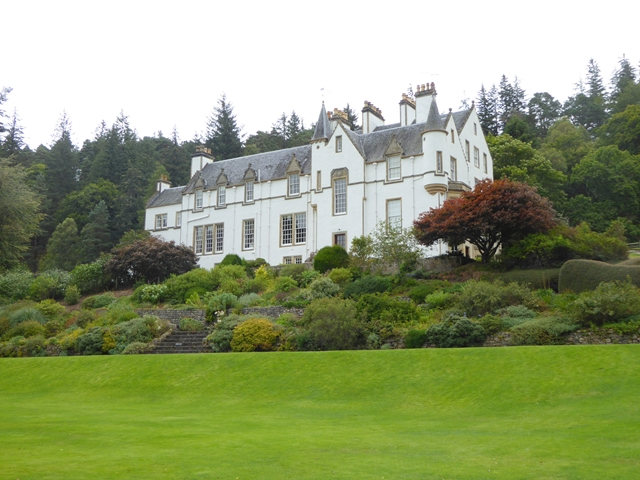
Logie House, built in a Scottish Baronial style

Logie House is a house and gardens built in Baronial style, near Forres in Moray, Scotland.

== History ==
Logie House was begun for the son of the Cumming family in the 18th century. After several renovations in the following centuries, in 1924, the house was bought by Sir Alexander Grant, a businessman who started McVitie & Price and developed the digestive biscuit. On 26 January 1971 it became a Category B listed building.

Close to the house is Randolph's Leap. According to legend, Randolph's Leap was the site of a battle in the 1300s in which Thomas Randolph, later Earl of Moray, was pursuing a Comyn who leaped to the other side and escaped back to his castle.

== Logie Steading ==
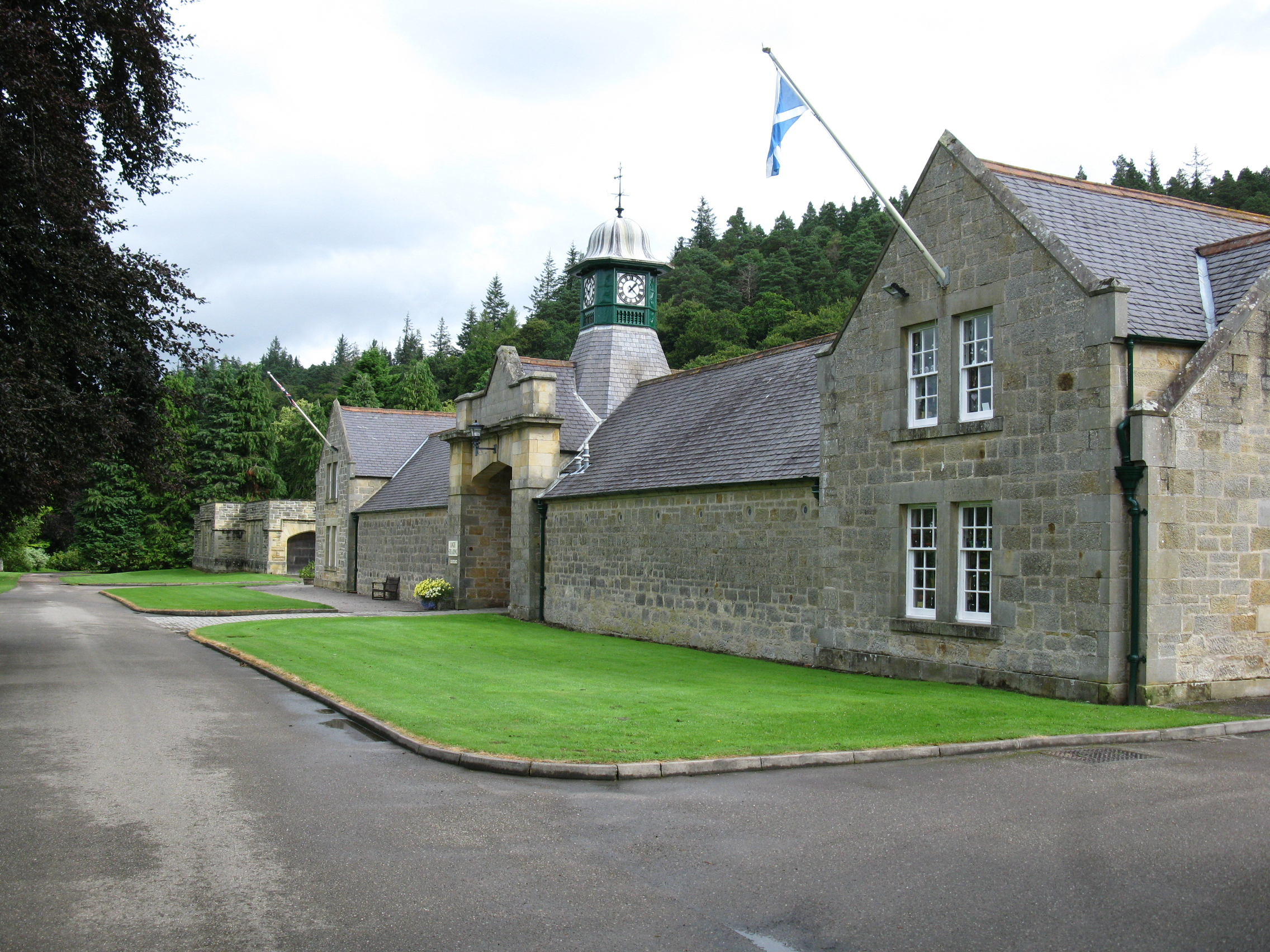
The entrance to Logie Steading

Logie Steading is composed of a collection of sandstone farm buildings attached to Logie House and estate. It was built in the 1920s as a model farm and now houses independent shops, a cafe and hosts exhibitions and events, attracting visitors as a sightseeing place.

The steading is also the home of the Logie herd of Longhorn Cattle, which was founded in 1982.

== Nature and environment ==
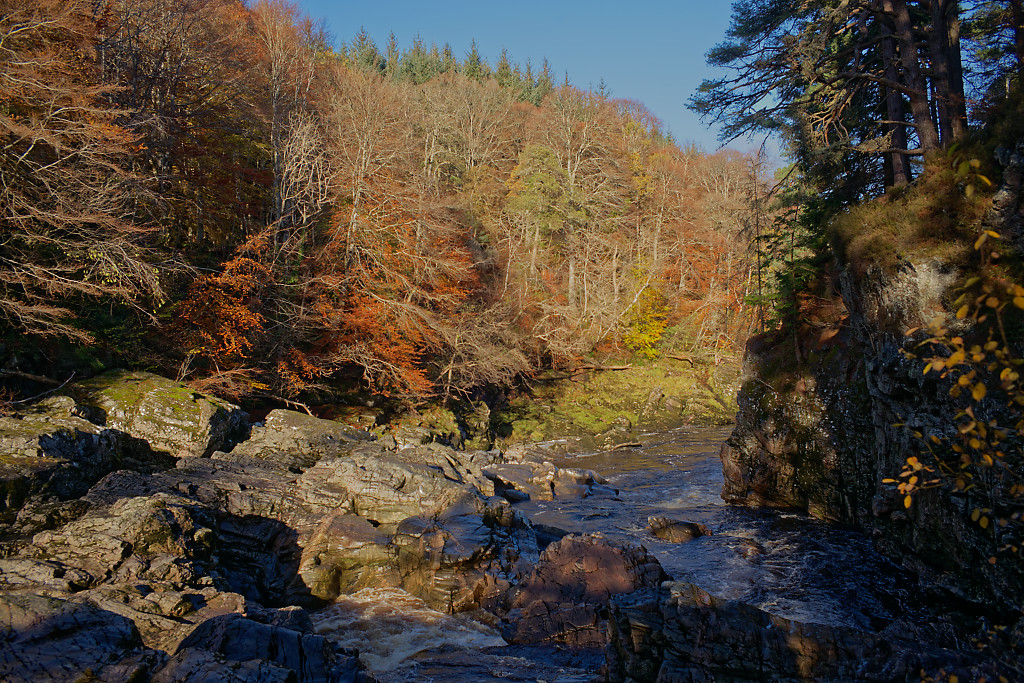
Randolph's Leap on the River Findhorn

This part of the Findhorn, the area around Logie House and Gardens, is renowned for its dramatic rocks, cliffs, waterfalls, and pine forest. Important wildlife, such as lesser black-backed gulls, woodpeckers and red squirrels, frequent the area.
