= Dorback Burn, Findhorn =

Tributary of the River Findhorn, Scotland

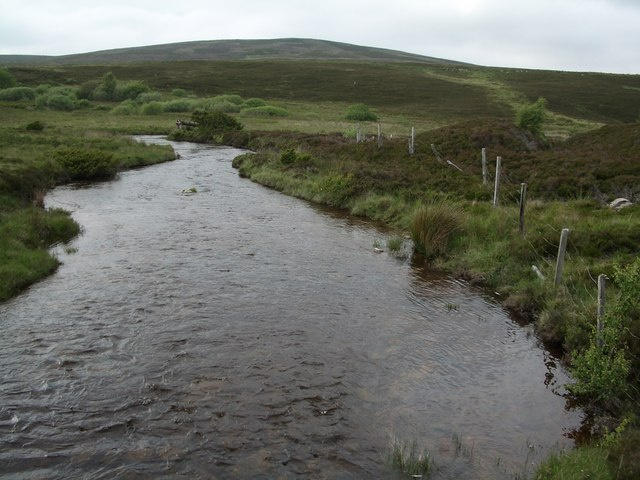
Dorback Burn, looking north from Lochindorb

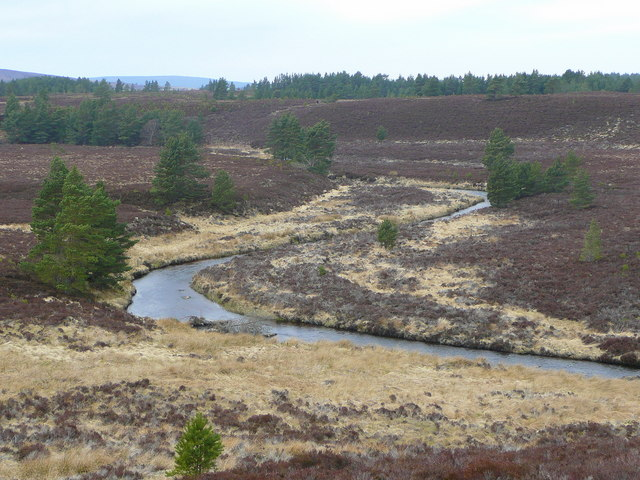
Bends in the Dorback Burn, near Dava

The Dorback Burn (Scottish Gaelic: Dorbag / Uisge Dhorbaig) is a right-bank tributary of the River Findhorn in northeast Scotland. It emerges from the northeast end of Lochindorb (57.4152°N 3.7038°W) and flows northeast to a point where the A939 road and A940 road meet, where it is joined on its right by the Anaboard Burn. The Dorback then flows north, accompanied by the A940 for several miles until it is joined by the River Divie, which also enters from the right (east). Their combined waters flow on for a couple more miles to pass under the B9007 road and immediately enter the Findhorn (57.5279°N 3.6702°W).
