= Dyke, Moray =

Coordinates: 57.604°N 3.693°W

Dyke: Scottish Gaelic: Dìg
- Location within Moray
- Council area: Moray
- Lieutenancy area: Moray
- Country: Scotland
- Sovereign state: United Kingdom
- Post town: FORRES
- Postcode district: IV36
- Dialling code: 01309
- Police: Scotland
- Fire: Scottish
- Ambulance: Scottish
- UK Parliament: Moray
- Scottish Parliament: Moray

Dyke (Scottish Gaelic: Dìg) is a small village situated in the north of Scotland on the Moray coast, approximately 4 miles west of Forres. The origin of the name of the parish of Dyke is supposed to be the Gaelic word dìg, signifying a water drain or ditch. Dyke is situated close to Brodie Castle, Culbin Forest and the River Findhorn. It is also near to Macbeth's Hillock, thought to be the setting of Macbeth's meeting with the witches in Shakespeare's play.

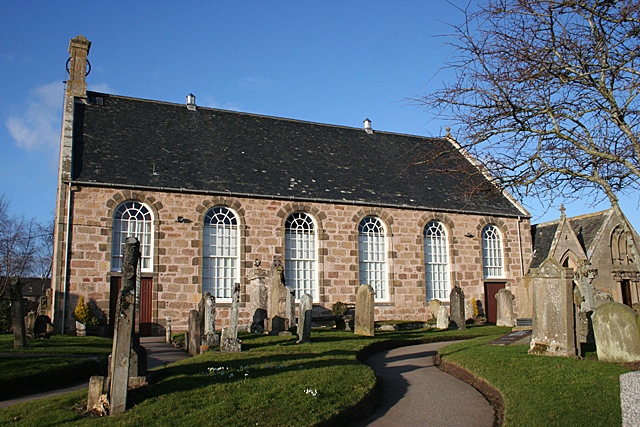
Dyke Parish Church, located in the village

There are two church buildings in Dyke: the still functional Dyke Parish Church, built in 1781, and the old East Church, which was an old Presbyterian church built in 1856 on land given to the town by the Brodie family, still major landowners in the region. This old church was closed in the mid 20th century and used as a potato barn for many decades, a fate common to many old churches in the region. It is now in use as a bed and breakfast establishment.

== Education ==
Today the village contains a popular primary school.

Secondary students are in the catchment zone of Forres Academy in Forres.
