= Findhorn Viaduct (Forres) =

Bridge in Moray, Scotland

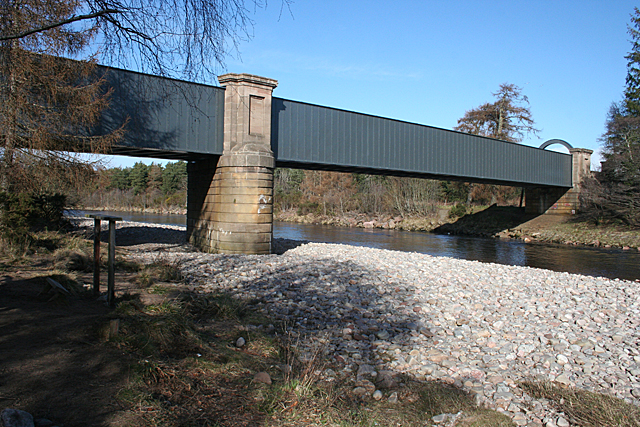
- Coordinates: 57°36′26″N 3°38′27″W
- Carries: Aberdeen-Inverness line
- Crosses: River Findhorn

Characteristics
- Material: Cast iron and masonry

History
- Designer: Joseph Mitchell
- Construction end: 1858

Listed Building – Category A
- Official name: Findhorn Viaduct
- Designated: 24 April 1989
- Reference no.: LB8690

Location
- Interactive map of Findhorn Viaduct

The Findhorn Viaduct is a railway bridge at Forres (north-east of Inverness) in the Moray council area of Scotland. It crosses the River Findhorn to the west of the town. Opened in 1858, it is a Category A listed building.

== History ==
The viaduct was built for the Inverness and Aberdeen Junction Railway (later amalgamated into the Highland Railway). Work commenced in 1856 and the structure was completed in 1858. The engineer was Joseph Mitchell and the builders were Thomas Brassey and James Falshaw. The ironwork was by William Fairbairn & Sons of Manchester, England.

== Design ==
The viaduct carries a single track over the River Findhorn approximately 1.1 miles (1.7 kilometres) west of the town of Forres. It comprises three spans of wrought iron open-top box, each 150 feet (46 m) long. The viaduct is comparatively low, reaching a height of 18 feet 6 inches (5.64 metres) above the river. The total length of the structure, including side spans, is approximately 203 yards (186 metres). The side spans are also in wrought iron and linked at the ends by wrought-iron ties in the shape of arches which span the width of the structure.

The spans are supported on large piers of channelled masonry and ashlar. The piers have rectangular panels cut into their sides, large high cutwaters, and terminate in moulded caps. Their foundations are in the rock bed 18 feet (5.5 metres) below the river. The abutments have similar detailing, along with Romanesque balustrades, rusticated incisions. A cast-iron plaque records the opening of the bridge in 1858.

The Findhorn Viaduct was designated a Category A listed building in 1989, a status which provides it legal protection.

The viaduct shares its name with another railway bridge crossing the same river, the Findhorn Viaduct near Tomatin, some 14 kilometres (8.7 miles) south-east of Inverness.

== See also ==
- List of bridges in Scotland
