= Dyke Parish Church =

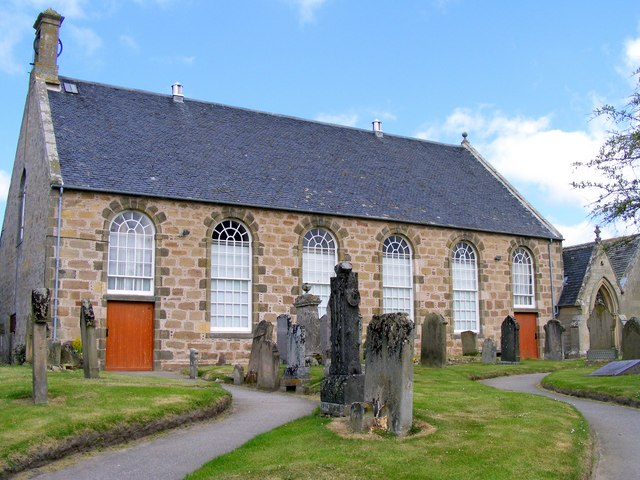
- The six-bay south front
- Dyke Parish Church
- 57°36′16″N 3°41′30″W
- Location: Dyke
- Country: Scotland
- Denomination: Church of Scotland

History
- Founded: 1781

Architecture
- Functional status: Active
- Heritage designation: Category A listed building

Dyke Parish Church is a Georgian church in Dyke, a village in Moray. In active use by the Church of Scotland since it was built in 1781, it stands on the site of a mediaeval church, and incorporates an older mausoleum, which is now the church hall and vestry. An early mediaeval Pictish cross slab, and a twelfth century coin hoard were discovered in the grounds while the church was being built. It was designated a Category A listed building in 1971.

== History ==
The church was built as a rural parish church in 1781, at a cost of £525, by James Smith of Aldearn and James Smith of Nairn, on the site of a mediaeval church, first mentioned in a charter of the late twelfth century. Walker and Woodworth assert that the original church was dedicated to St Andrew, but other scholars have written that it was dedicated to St Ninian.

During the construction of the church, a twelfth century hoard of around 100 coins was discovered, as was an early mediaeval pictish cross slab, which is now installed in the grounds of Brodie Castle.

At the east end of the church is a transverse wing which was predates the rest of the building, and is thought to have been attached as an aisle to the older church. It was built around 1693 as a mausoleum for the Brodie family, and now serves as a church hall and vestry, connecting to the church via a narrow corridor through the east gable.

A gothic porch was added between the former mausoleum and the main church building in 1853, and the south face was remodelled in a gothic style by Matthews and Lawrie in 1867. The building underwent renovation in 1952, in which a new ceiling was installed (covering the pulpit's sounding board), but the original 1781 layout remained unchanged.

A war memorial gate into the north west extension was built between 1920 and 1922 by Peter Macgregor Chalmers, a Glasgow architect who worked and wrote extensively on ecclesiastical buildings. The church was designated a Category A listed building in January, 1971. In 2018, the church was awarded a grant for £10,000 by the Berry Burn Community Fund to improve accessibility to the church and hall.

== Description ==
The church is a rectangular building, with a six-bay south front of pinned rubble, with rubble sides and rear, and with tooled and polished ashlar detailing. The round-headed windows are large, reaching almost to the top of the wall. At the apex of the west gable is a tall ashlar bellcote, with a wheel mechanism to ring the bell. The left gable has cast iron door grill, which is now blocked. The Gothic porch, between the church and the hall, is also now blocked; it has a pointed-arch doorway with columns and a hoodmold with now-weathered carvings of a bearded man and a woman, and a tall Celtic cross at the apex. The south gable of the church hall has an ornate doorway of ashlar sandstone, with Ionic columns supporting a corniced lintel, and a large window with intersecting stone tracery.

The interior features a U-plan gallery, and an unusual triple-decker pulpit in the centre of the south wall, with stairs leading up to it from left and right.

== Current usage ==
The church is an active place of worship, operated by the Dyke and Edinkillie Parish Church of Scotland, with regular Sunday services at 10 am on Sundays, except on the first Sunday of each month when services are at 11 am, rotating between the parish's two buildings.
