= Findhorn Viaduct (Tomatin) =

Bridge in the Scottish Highlands

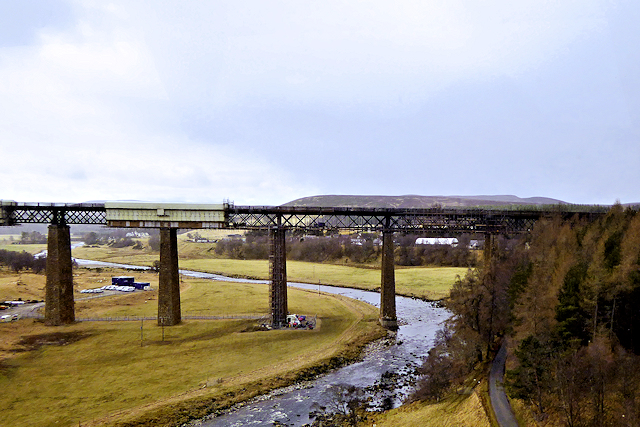
- Bridge crossing the River Findhorn
- Coordinates: 57°20′05″N 3°59′05″W
- Carries: Highland Main Line
- Crosses: River Findhorn

Characteristics
- Material: Rubble piers and latticed steel girders

History
- Designer: Murdoch Paterson and John Folwer
- Built: 1897

Listed Building – Category B
- Official name: Tomatin, Railway Viaduct Over River Findhorn
- Designated: 4 October 1971
- Reference no.: LB14893

Location
- Interactive map of Findhorn Viaduct

The Findhorn Viaduct is a railway bridge approximately 500 metres (550 yd) east of the village of Tomatin (south-east of Inverness) in the Scottish Highlands, which carries the Perth to Inverness railway line over the valley of the River Findhorn.

== History ==
The skyline around Tomatin is dominated by two railway viaducts, of which the one over the Findhorn is the largest, located around 500 metres (1,600 feet) east of the village. The other is Tomatin Viaduct, a masonry bridge just to the north. There is another large viaduct at Slochd, around five miles (eight kilometres) south of the village. It shares its name with the viaduct at Forres of the same name which crosses the same river.

The Findhorn Viaduct was designed and built for the Highland Railway between 1894 and 1897 by Murdoch Paterson, their chief engineer, and John Fowler, who was the consulting engineer and who also worked on the design of the Forth Rail Bridge. The viaduct was Fowler's suggestion in order to create a more direct route; the railway company had originally planned a more circuitous route around the valley, over a mile longer. The steel for the lattice work was supplied by the Butterley Iron Company in Derbyshire, England. The granite for the piers was supplied by Kemnay Quarry in Kemnay, Aberdeenshire, which also supplied materials for the Forth Bridge.

It was opened to traffic on 19 July 1897.

The viaduct is still in active use in the 2020s. It is a Category B listed building, first listed in 1971, a status which grants it legal protection.

== Design ==
The viaduct is 435 yards (398 metres) long and reaches a maximum height of 144 feet (44 metres). It consists of nine lattice girder spans, constructed with double warren steel trusses, similar to those used by Fowler on the Forth Rail Bridge. The spans are supported by slender, tapering piers of tooled rubble. The viaduct is on a gentle curve across the valley. It is approached on either side by two traditional semi-circular masonry arches of 24-foot (7.3-metre) span.

Benedict Le Vay described it as "spectacular" in his 2014 book Britain from the Rails. Roland Paxton and Jim Shipway, in the Civil Engineering Heritage series, called it "a striking and well-proportioned example of Victorian railway engineering".

== See also ==
- List of bridges in Scotland
