= Findhorn railway station =

Former railway station in Scotland

Coordinates: 57.659431°N 3.612747°W

Findhorn

General information
- Location: Scotland
- Platforms: 1

Other information
- Status: Disused

History
- Original company: Findhorn Railway

Key dates
- 18 April 1860: Opened
- 31 January 1869: Closed
Location

Findhorn railway station formerly served Findhorn in Moray, Scotland.

== History ==
The station was opened by the Findhorn Railway on 18 April 1860.

On 28 January 1861, James Grant, guard, was endeavouring to loosen the connecting screws between two carriages. The engine driver backed up to relieve the strain, and Grant got his arm trapped between the buffers and was hospitalised.

The station closed to passengers on 31 January 1869. Freight services to the station continued on an irregular basis for around another 10 years.

== See also ==
- List of closed railway stations in Britain
