= Forres Academy =

Location
- Burdsyard Road, Forres; Moray, IV36 1FG; Scotland; 57.6037°N 3.6119°W

Information
- Type: State Secondary School
- Motto: Aspire to inspire
- Head teacher: Jan Sinclair
- Staff: 66
- Years: S1-S6
- Age: 12 to 18
- Enrolment: 873
- Website: https://blogs.glowscotland.org.uk/my/forresacademy/

Forres Academy is a comprehensive community school serving the town of Forres, Scotland, and its rural catchment area in west Moray. As in other Scottish schools, pupils are able to leave after the fourth year of schooling; therefore, the fifth and sixth years are not compulsory.

== Catchment area ==
The school serves the villages of Alves, Dallas, Dyke, Logie, Kinloss (including children of Army personnel) and Findhorn (including the nearby Findhorn Community)

Some students transfer from an area Rudolf Steiner school.

== Location ==
The school is located next to Forres Swimming Pool and is also near to Applegrove Primary School and is a short walk from both the TESCO store for Forres and the high street.

== The building ==
The school's building has been deemed below standard, having received a D for the building's condition. Reinforced autoclaved aerated concrete (RAAC) has been found within the structure of the current building in August 2023, causing a temporary closure to the school in September 2023.

Plans for a new building have been approved by the Moray Council, and is expected to be in use by autumn 2028.
