= Scythris empetrella =

Scientific classification
- Kingdom: Animalia
- Phylum: Arthropoda
- Clade: Pancrustacea
- Class: Insecta
- Order: Lepidoptera
- Family: Scythrididae
- Genus: Scythris
- Species: S. empetrella

Binomial name
- Scythris empetrella Karsholt & Nielsen, 1976

Synonyms
- Glyphipteryx variella Stephens, 1835 (preocc.)

Species of moth

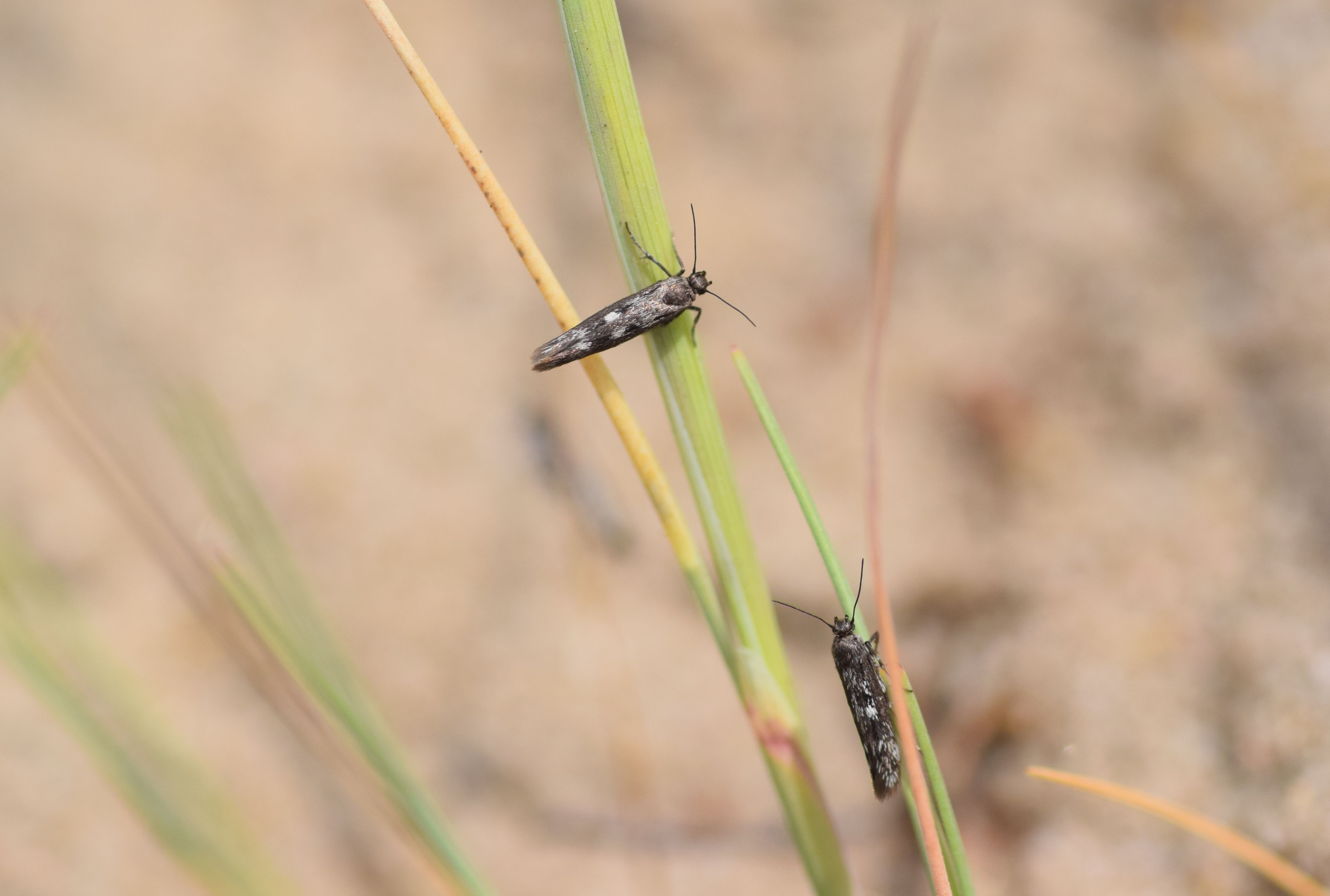
Scythris empetrella moths in the Soesterduinen, Netherlands.

Scythris empetrella is a moth of the family Scythrididae described by Ole Karsholt and Ebbe Nielsen in 1976 and found in Europe.

== Description ==
The wingspan is 8–10 mm. Adults are on wing from June to July.

== Distribution ==
S. empetrella is found in Great Britain, Spain, France, Belgium, the Netherlands, Germany, Denmark, Norway, Sweden, Finland, Estonia and Lithuania. The habitat is sandy heathland.
