= Randolph's Leap =

Coordinates: 57°31′29″N 3°40′42″W

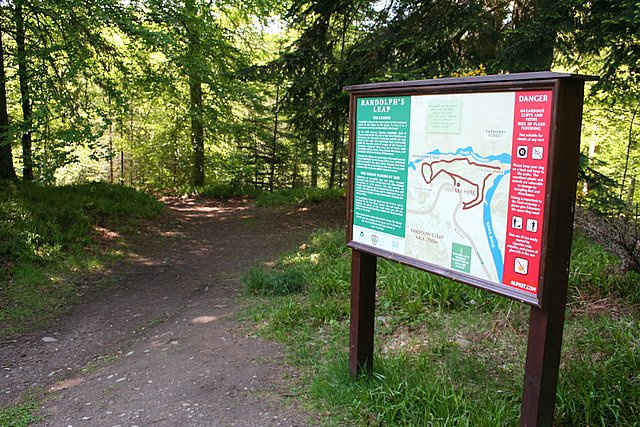
The entrance to Randolph's Leap, with a map

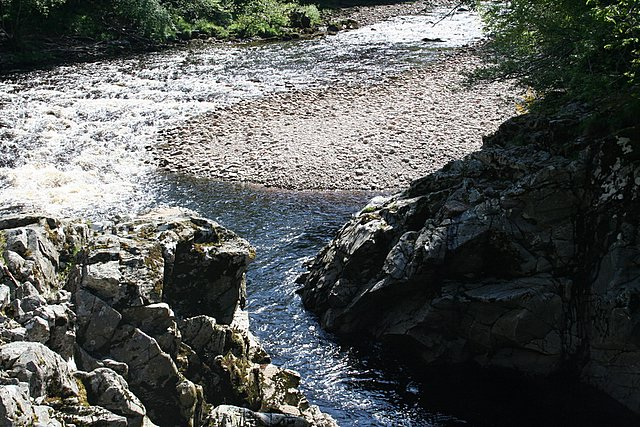
Pictured is the leap the area is named after

Randolph's Leap (also known as the Brig of Rannoch) is an SSSI and area of countryside in Moray, Scotland. The area surrounds the River Findhorn and is named after the point at the river where the sheer rock banks are closest.

According to legend, Randolph's Leap was the site of a battle in the 1300s in which Thomas Randolph, later Earl of Moray, was pursuing a Comyn who leaped to the other side and escaped back to his castle. The Comyn castle fell, and the lands were granted by King Robert to Randolph. The name gradually changed from Comyn's Leap to Randolph's Leap.

The nearest settlement is Logie House, a steading from where walks along the side of the river can be taken. This part of the Findhorn is renowned for its dramatic rocks, cliffs and waterfalls, and peaceful surrounding pine forest. Randolph's Leap is also an important wildlife area, with lesser black-backed gulls, woodpeckers and red squirrels.

== See also ==
- River Findhorn
