= Culbin Sands, Forest and Findhorn Bay =

Area of coast and countryside and SSSI in Moray, Scotland

Coordinates: 57.632°N 3.726°W

Culbin Sands, Forest and Findhorn Bay is a large area of coast and countryside and an SSSI (site of special scientific interest) in Moray, Scotland, stretching from just east of the town of Nairn eastwards to the village of Findhorn and its bay. All of the areas are very important for wildlife in general and are strongly protected by law. The Culbin Sands are known in Gaelic as Bar Inbhir Èireann.

== Culbin Forest ==
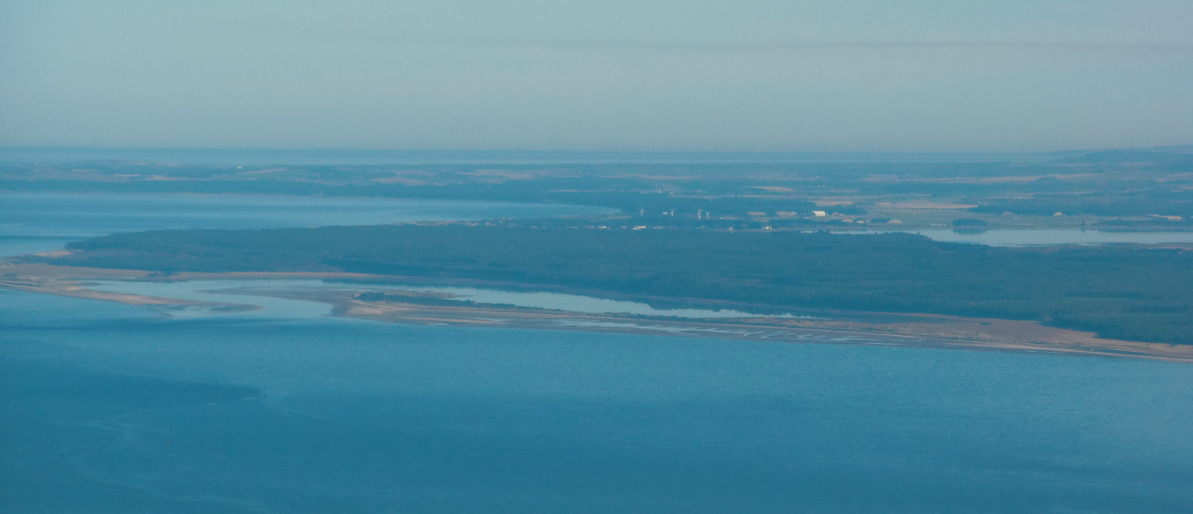
The eastern end of the Culbin Forest from the north west with the Moray Firth in the foreground and Burghead Bay and Findhorn Bay beyond

This huge forest is almost completely owned by the Forestry and Land Scotland. It is split by several large paths and smaller tracks in between. The densely covered areas off these paths are difficult to traverse. Most walks are taken beginning at the south of the forest at Wellhill Car Park and ending at the beach. Among the trees there are several strange monoliths bearing messages, and at one tree there is a small plaque commemorating its planting by Prince Charles. Although mostly made up of tall pines and coarse ground cover, Culbin also has many more open, sandy patches in the forest, where small younger trees have recently been planted. The grassland areas are very suitable for butterflies. There are several ponds which act as oases to the local animals. Hill 99, a towering wooden structure which blends in subtly with the canopy, provides an excellent viewpoint. The wildlife amongst the trees is very discreet although birds can clearly be heard singing everywhere.

The forest hosts breeding crested tits. The forest is also an important site for the Kentish glory moth (Endromis versicolora), which exploits the forestry activity carried out by Forestry and Land Scotland. The timber felling generates spaces for birch saplings to take root, the larval food plant of the moths, which prefer saplings under three metres tall. The moths follow the timber felling around the forest, and the adults can be seen in April and May.

== Culbin Sands ==
Nowadays the name "Culbin Sands" means a beach, but formerly the name meant a large area of loose dune sand desert which is now the Culbin Forest. In its heyday, the dune system was the largest in Britain, and one of the largest in Europe.

This long strip of pristine beach is owned by the RSPB, due to its excellent bird habitat, home to Eurasian oystercatchers, Eurasian curlews, common redshanks and other birds. It is made up of a curious mixture of sand and long grass, but gets muddier further westwards. Much natural driftwood ends up on the sands. Three sand spits enclose a large salt marsh known as 'The Gut'. The largest, known as 'The Bar', is the largest spit in Scotland.

Towards Nairn, the beach is home to a wintering population of pale-bellied brant geese, one of only two in Scotland. The birds belong to the Svalbard population.

In 1888 and 1889, the dunes hosted breeding pairs of Pallas's sandgrouse, the only time this has ever been recorded in Scotland.

The sands had a reputation for shifting, engulfing homesteads. This was due to removal of marram from the dunes for thatching, as the roots helped to hold the soil together. The Forestry Commission (now Forestry and Land Scotland) sought to stabilise the dune in much a similar method by planting scrub, before giving the land over to forestry.

Plantation forestry has led to the loss of over 95% of the dune system. The remaining dunes at Findhorn are nationally important for lichens, invertebrates and fungi. Over 70 species found on them are of high priority for conservation action. Many are included on the Scottish Biodiversity List, and some are found at only a handful of places in Scotland. These include the red-banded sand wasp (Ammophila sabulosa), the ling owlet moth (Scythris empetrella), the bend-bearing blunt-brow spider (Silometopus incurvatus), the felt lichen (Peltigera malacea), and the brittlestem fungus (Psathyrella flexispora). The Findhorn Hinterland Trust, a local community charity, owns and manages 50 ha. of land adjoining Findhorn Park Ecovillage. It is undertaking a project to remove encroaching whin bushes and restore the dynamic dune habitat.

== Findhorn Bay ==
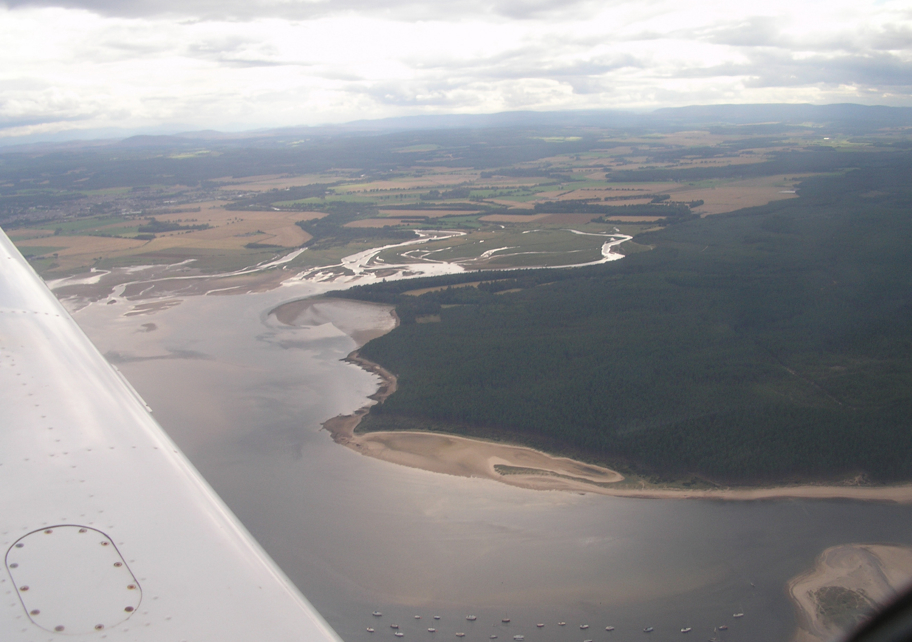
Aerial photo of Findhorn Bay, with the east end of the Culbin Forest at right and the estuary of the River Findhorn at centre.

The 'Bay' is not a true bay at all, but a large tidal basin. It is enclosed by the villages of Kinloss and Findhorn to the east, and Culbin Forest to the west. It drains the river Findhorn and the Muckle Burn.

Opposite Findhorn Village, the beach is home to a mixed colony of grey and common seals. Common eiders can be seen offshore and European herring gulls fly around the general area. On the southern side of the bay, there is a brackish pool frequented by waders such as the greenshank in migrant season.

In the winter, the bay is home to a roost of at least 10,000 pink-footed geese. The flock is exploited by fowlers, leading to some tensions locally with animal lovers.

The bay is deepest in the channel leading out to the Moray Firth, reaching up to 10 metres. Other than that, the bay is predominantly shallow, the average depth being circa 2 metres. Due this safety, and lack of strong swell, the bay is popular with amateur sailors and windsurfers.

== History ==
There was a village situated to the North East of the Culbin Forest, although the exact location is not known. Reports of the village and land around it being buried in sandstorms of 1694, as reported by several major channels, was not captured in the news records of the time. Stories of the village being buried by sandstorm are based in folklore. However, recordings of this time (still stored by the Local Heritage Centre in Elgin, Moray) mention the town and its deforestation of the Culbin Forest, which resulted in destabilizing the land between the village and the mainland. This allowed the sea to corrode the land and, eventually, sink the town.

This was the same scenario also impacted the village Findhorn, which used to extend further north into the Sea.

Due to the extent of the Culbin deforestation by the Village of Culbin, the Culbin Sands sat empty until the 1920s when the Forestry Commission planted the area with pine trees over a period of 40 years.
