= Findhorn =

Coordinates: 57.659°N 3.611°W

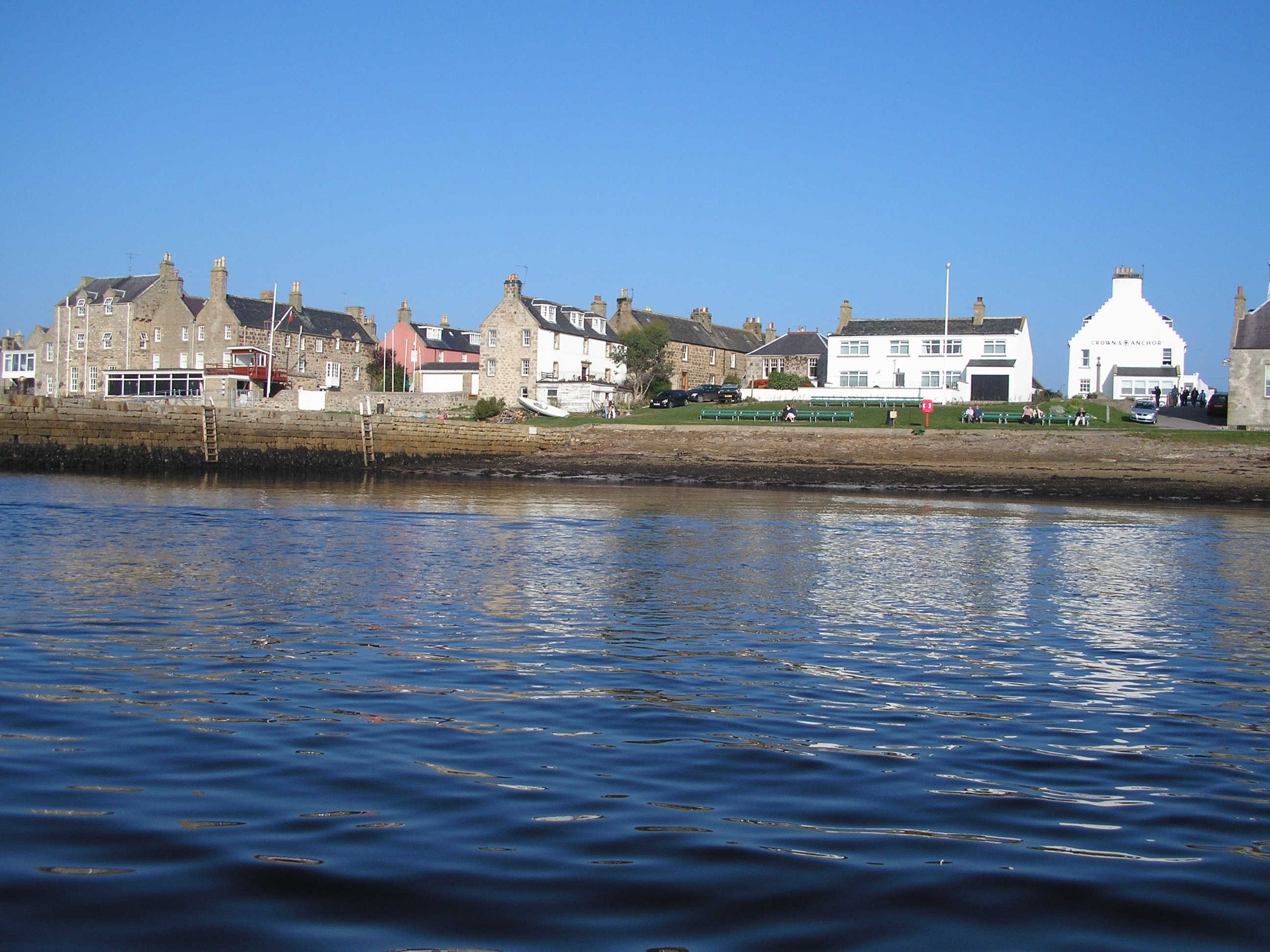
- The Loading Bank at Findhorn. The Crown and Anchor Inn is at right, the Royal Findhorn Yacht Club to the left.

- Location within Moray
- Population: 1,030 (2020)
- Council area: Moray
- Country: Scotland
- Sovereign state: United Kingdom
- Post town: FORRES
- Postcode district: IV36
- Police: Scotland
- Fire: Scottish
- Ambulance: Scottish
- UK Parliament: Moray West, Nairn and Strathspey

Findhorn (Scottish Gaelic: Inbhir Èir or Inbhir Èireann) is a village in Moray, Scotland. It is located on the eastern shore of Findhorn Bay and immediately south of the Moray Firth. Findhorn is 3 miles (5 km) northwest of Kinloss, and about 5 miles (9 km) by road from Forres.

The Findhorn Foundation lies to the south of Findhorn Village but is considered separate from it.

== History ==
=== Original settlement ===
The existing settlement is the second village to bear this name, the original having been a mile to the northwest of the present position and inundated by the sea. This transposition was not an overnight catastrophe but a gradual withdrawal from the earlier site during the late seventeenth and early eighteenth centuries. Some sources (e.g. Graham), claim it is the third village to bear the name, perhaps erroneously assuming that the seventeenth century destruction of the nearby Barony of Culbin by shifting sands resulted in an earlier relocation.

Findhorn was part of the Barony of Muirton and was erected into burgh of barony by act of Parliament in 1661.

Although surely Gaelic in origin the derivation of the name of the River Findhorn is not absolutely clear. Watson (1926) states that it is derived from Fionn Èire, meaning "white Ireland" which "doubtless refers to the white sands of the estuary". The genitive Èireann gave rise to the use of the anglified 'erne' in other local names such as Invererne, Cullerne and Earnhill.

=== Major seaport ===
In the seventeenth century Findhorn was the principal seaport of Moray and vessels regularly sailed to and from all parts of the North Sea and as far as the Baltic Ports. Changes to the narrow and shallow entrance to the Bay created obstacles to navigation and as the size of trading vessels increased so the volume of trade to the village declined.

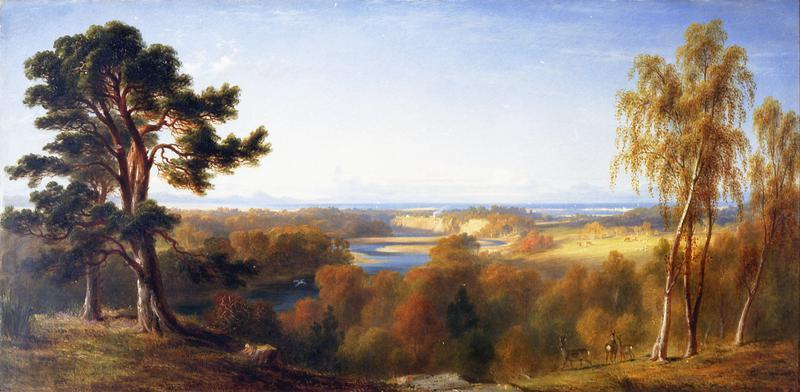
Oil painting, Findhorn, by James Giles

Findhorn Bay witnessed a brief episode in the 1745 Jacobite rising. In March 1746 the French brigantine Le Bien Trouvé entered the tidal waters with dispatches for Bonnie Prince Charlie but her departure, with the Prince's aide-de-camp on board, was delayed by the arrival of two British men-o'-war. Unable to enter the shallow bay, the two warships lay in wait in the Firth. Somehow Le Bien Trouvé slipped out and away to safety on a dark night. The name is recalled in the modern-day training gig of the same name which is based at Findhorn.

=== Fishing village ===
During the nineteenth century fishing predominated. During the 1829 floods known as "The Muckle Spate" five Findhorn fishing boats rescued Forres residents. For a few years (1860-9) there was a branch railway line to Findhorn railway station in the village to take advantage of the herring fleet. The following statistics show how Findhorn was on the decline as a fishing station in the years before the First World War:

Fishery Statistics

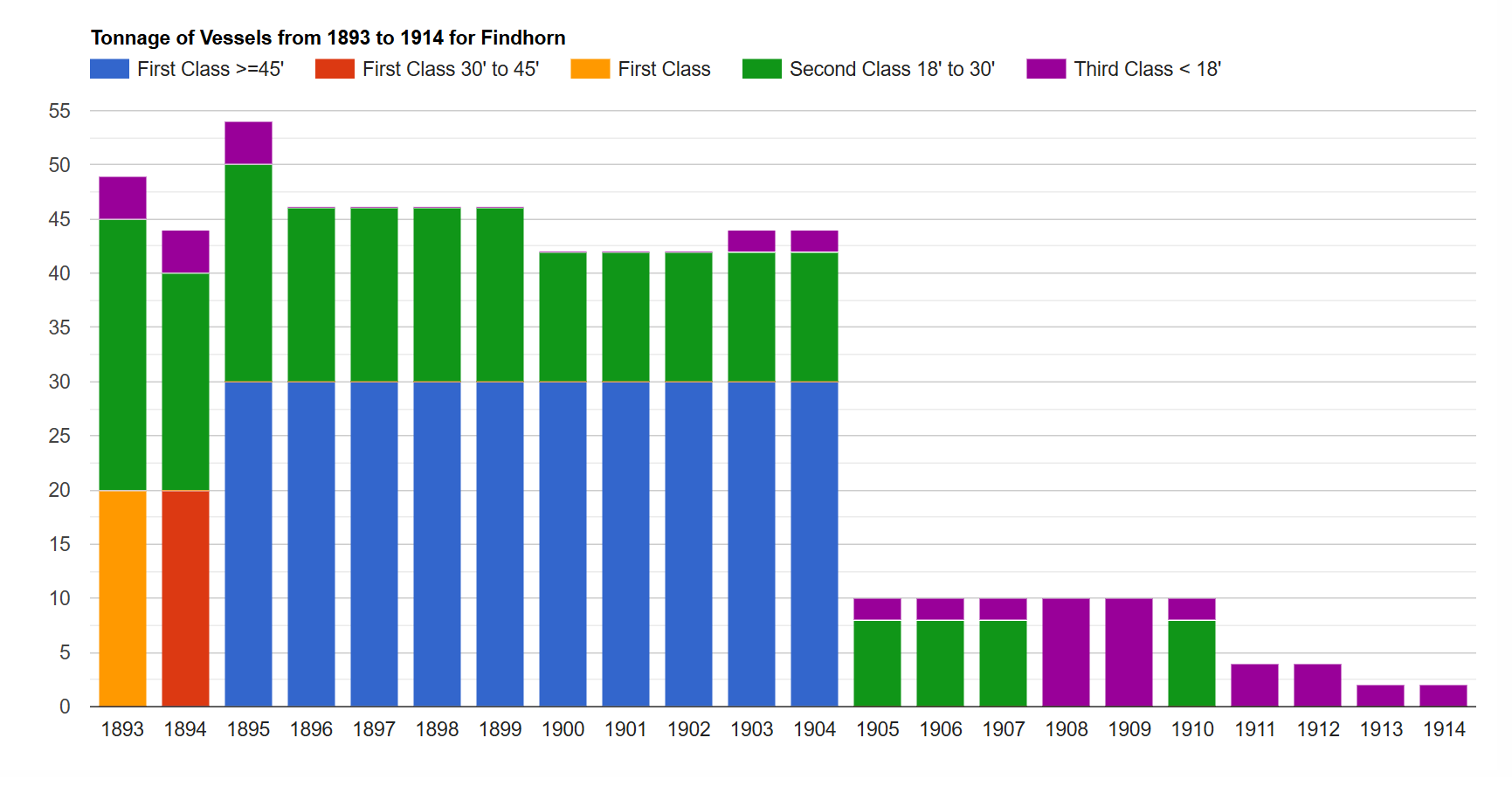
Tonnage of vessels

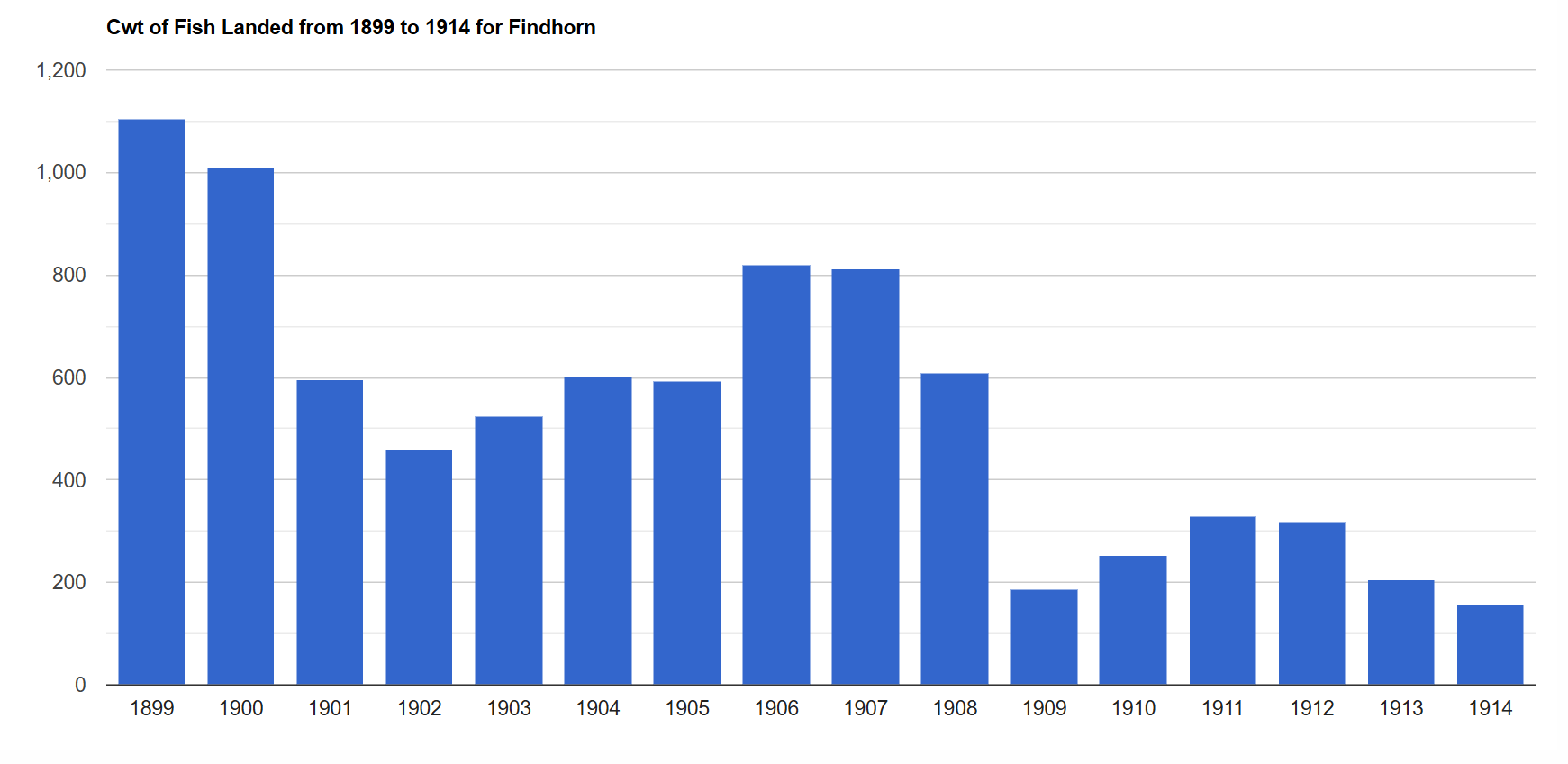
Cwt of fish landed

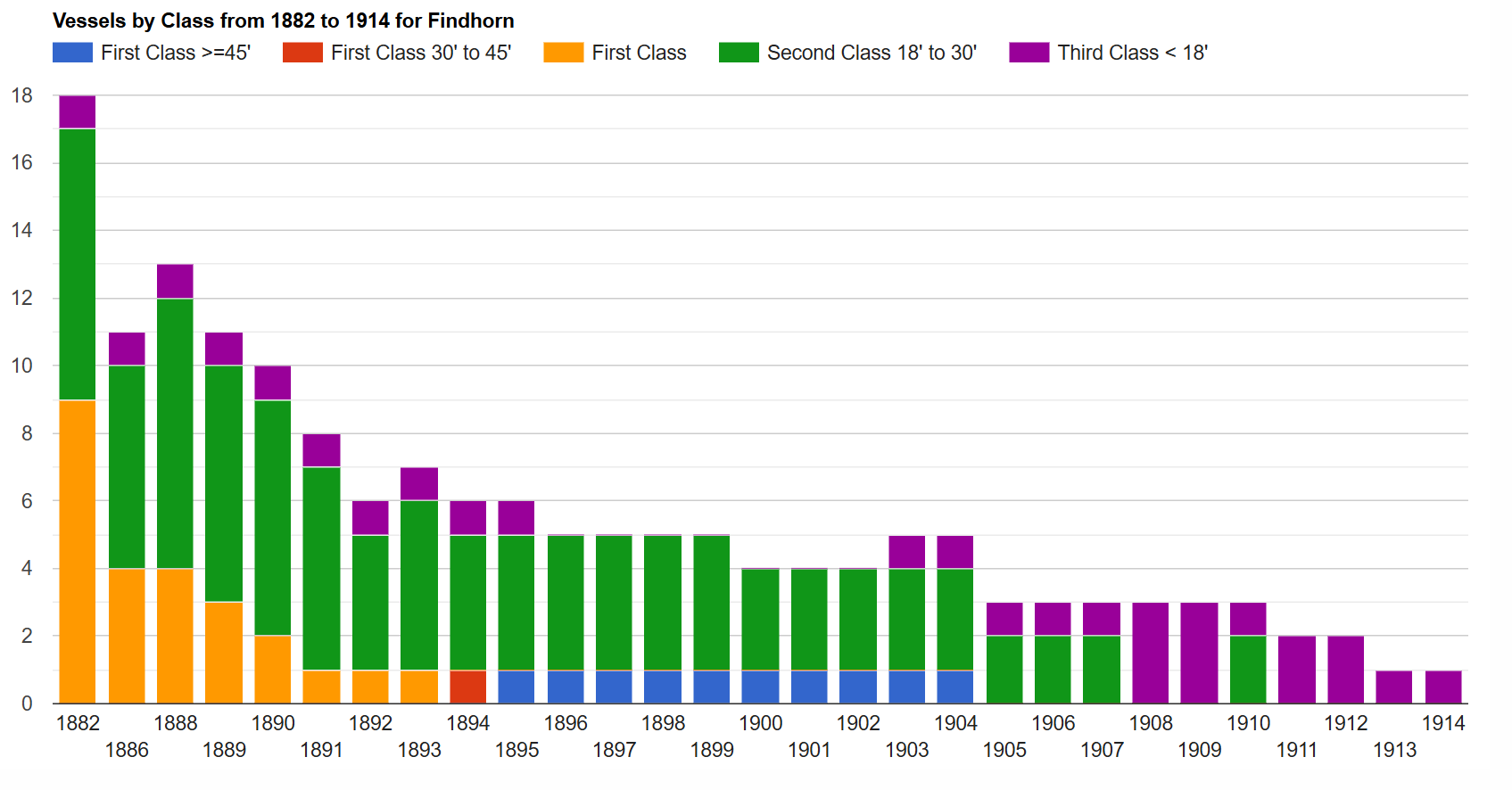
Vessels by class

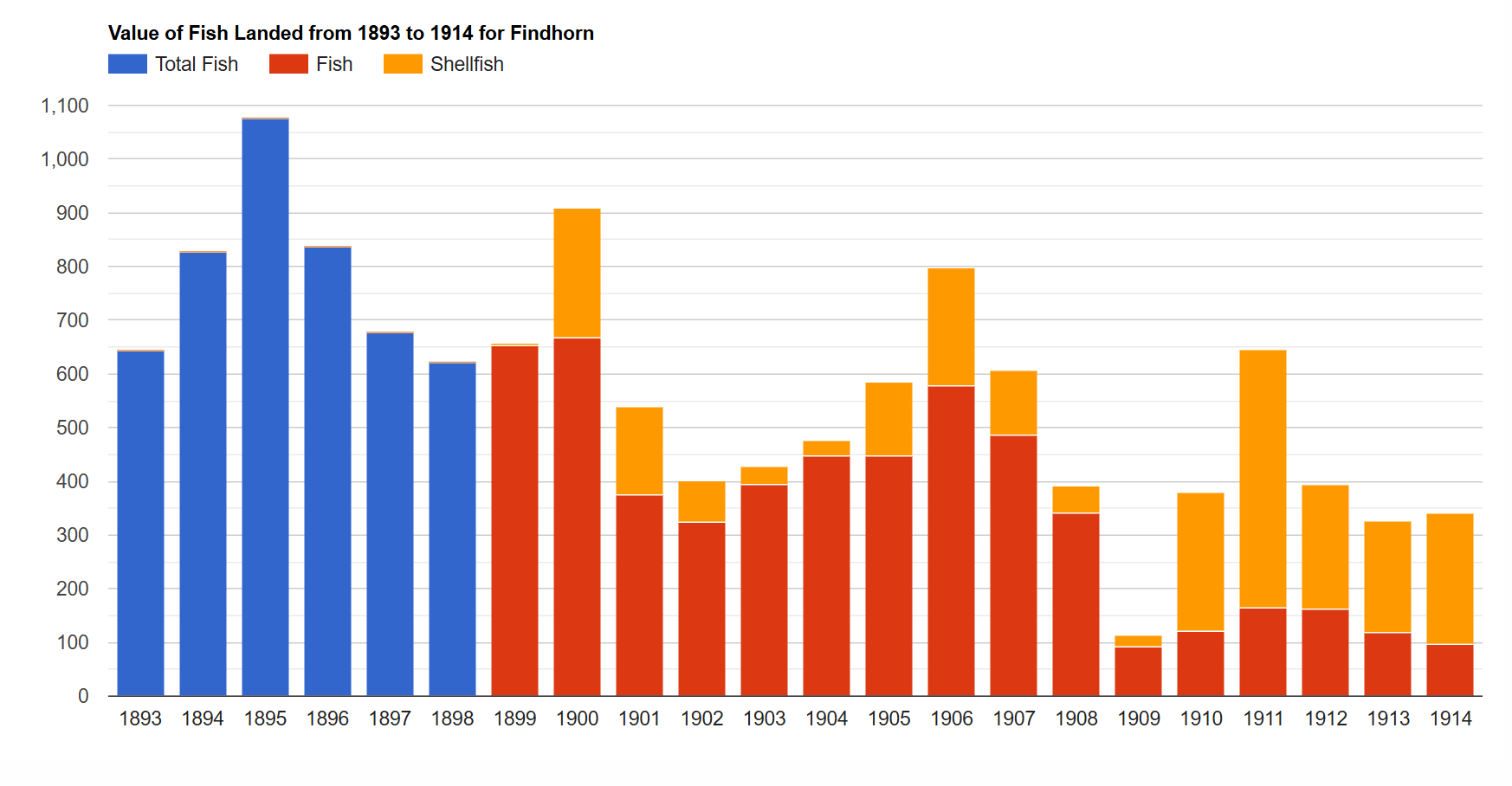
Value (£] of fish landed

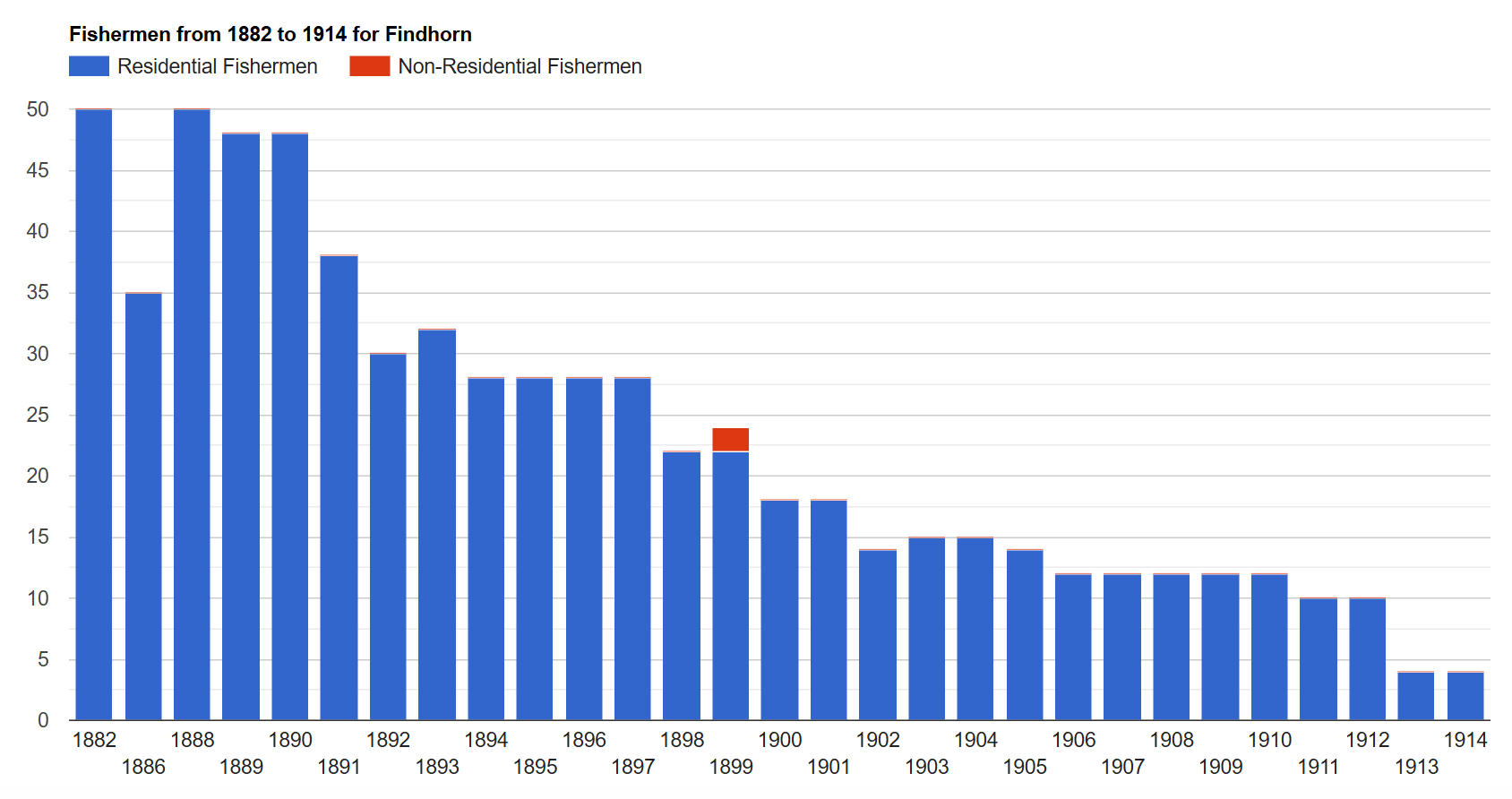
Fishermen

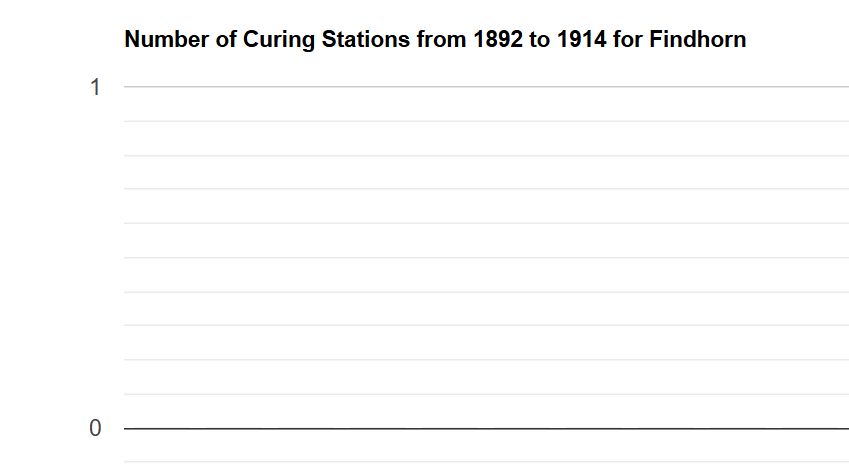
Placeholder-no curing stations

=== Modern times ===
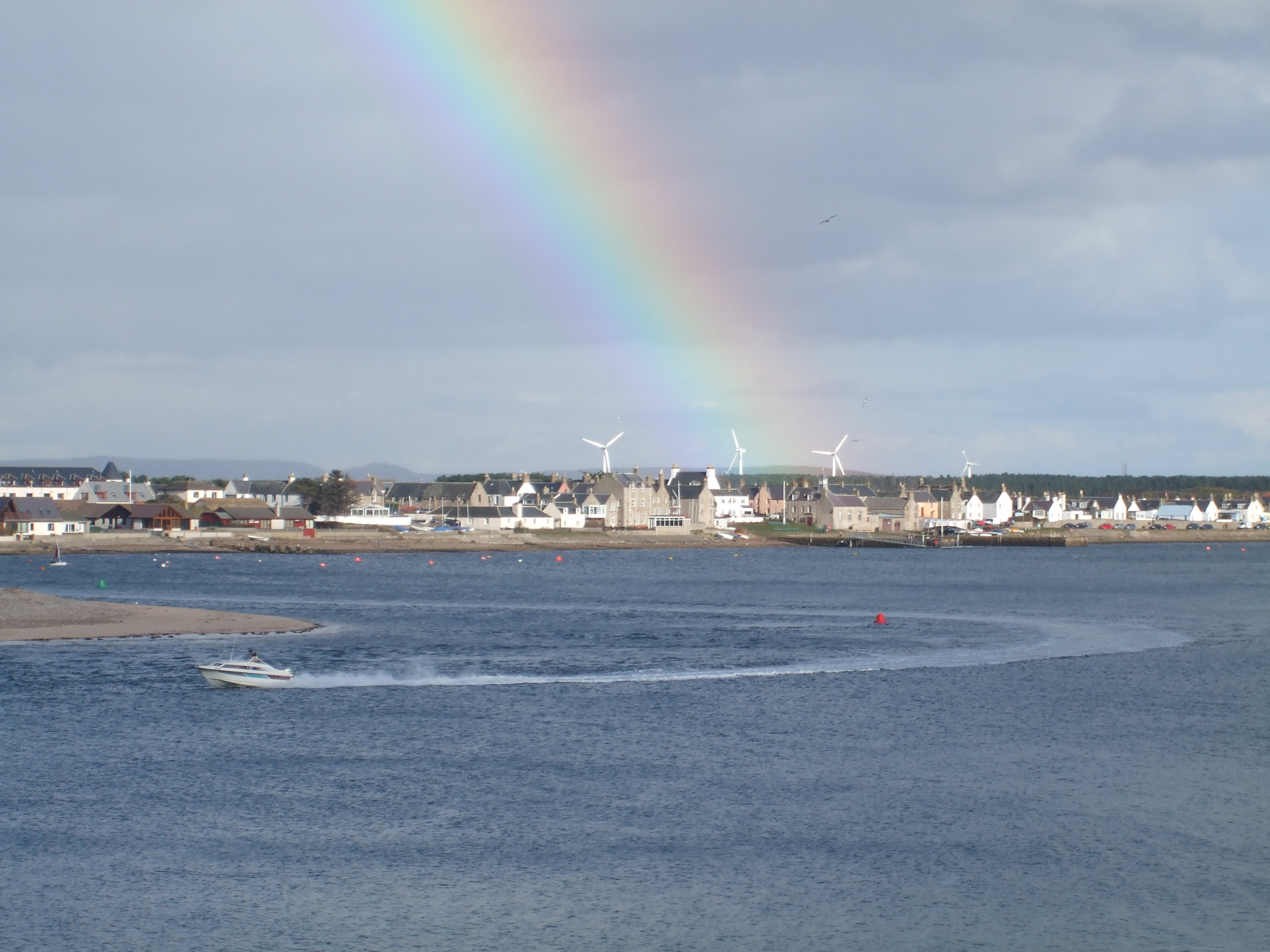
Distant view of Findhorn across Findhorn Bay from Culbin Forest

The early twentieth century saw a decline in fishing as the traditional two-masted zulus were in their turn being replaced by larger vessels. Some of the craft, 'temporarily' beached on the western shore of the Bay whilst their crews fought in the First World War, were never used again. The wreckage is still visible at low tide. The shore-based salmon fisheries lasted until the 1980s but they too are no more. Today the village is a dormitory suburb and leisure craft dominate the moorings.

The Crown and Anchor Inn, dating from 1739, is the oldest surviving structure in the village. Other prominent buildings of note include Findhorn House built in 1775, which is the home of the Royal Findhorn Yacht Club, The Kimberley Inn, the James Milne Institute, The Universal Hall at the Findhorn Foundation and the ice house Heritage Centre.

Findhorn Golf Club (now defunct) was founded in 1926 and continued until World War II.

== Education ==
Primary school students go to nearby Kinloss Primary School in Kinloss. Secondary students are in the catchment zone of Forres Academy in Forres.
