= River Divie =

River in Moray, Scotland

Coordinates: 57°31′39″N 3°40′13″W

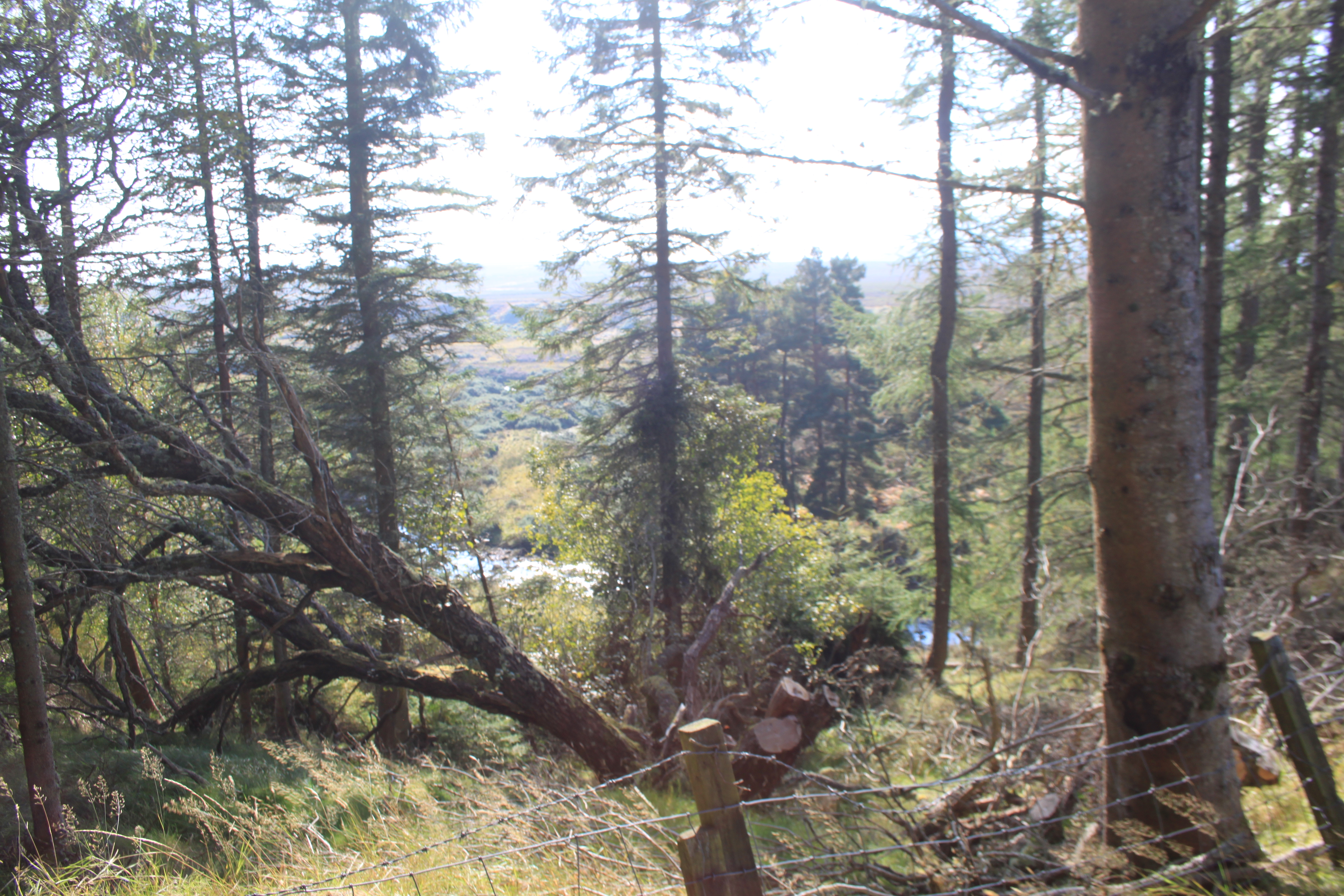
- River Divie behind the trees, close to Feakirk.

Location
- Country: United Kingdom
- District: Moray

Physical characteristics
- Length: Approx. 15 kilometers (9 mi)

Basin features
- Tributaries
  - left: Burn of Aulthaunachan, Caochan Chaorainn and Ourack Burn.
  - right: Berry Burn and Stripe of Craigroy
- Waterfalls: Falls of Feakirk
- Bridges: A940, Divie Viaduct, Bridge of Bantrach, Bridge of Newton and Bridge of Feakirk

River Divie (Scottish Gaelic: Abhainn Divie) is a river in Moray, Scotland, that is tributary to the River Findhorn. It begins near the Moray boundary, close to Lùb Ghlas (shieling), from the junction of an unnamed stream with the Allt Dearg stream.

The River Divie passes through Glenmore (presumably a former cottage, farm or a locality), after flowing northwestward through Dava Moor, it passes the Divie Viaduct, a notable landmark despite the river's relative obscurity.

The river features approximately two fords, as well as several footbridges near its end.

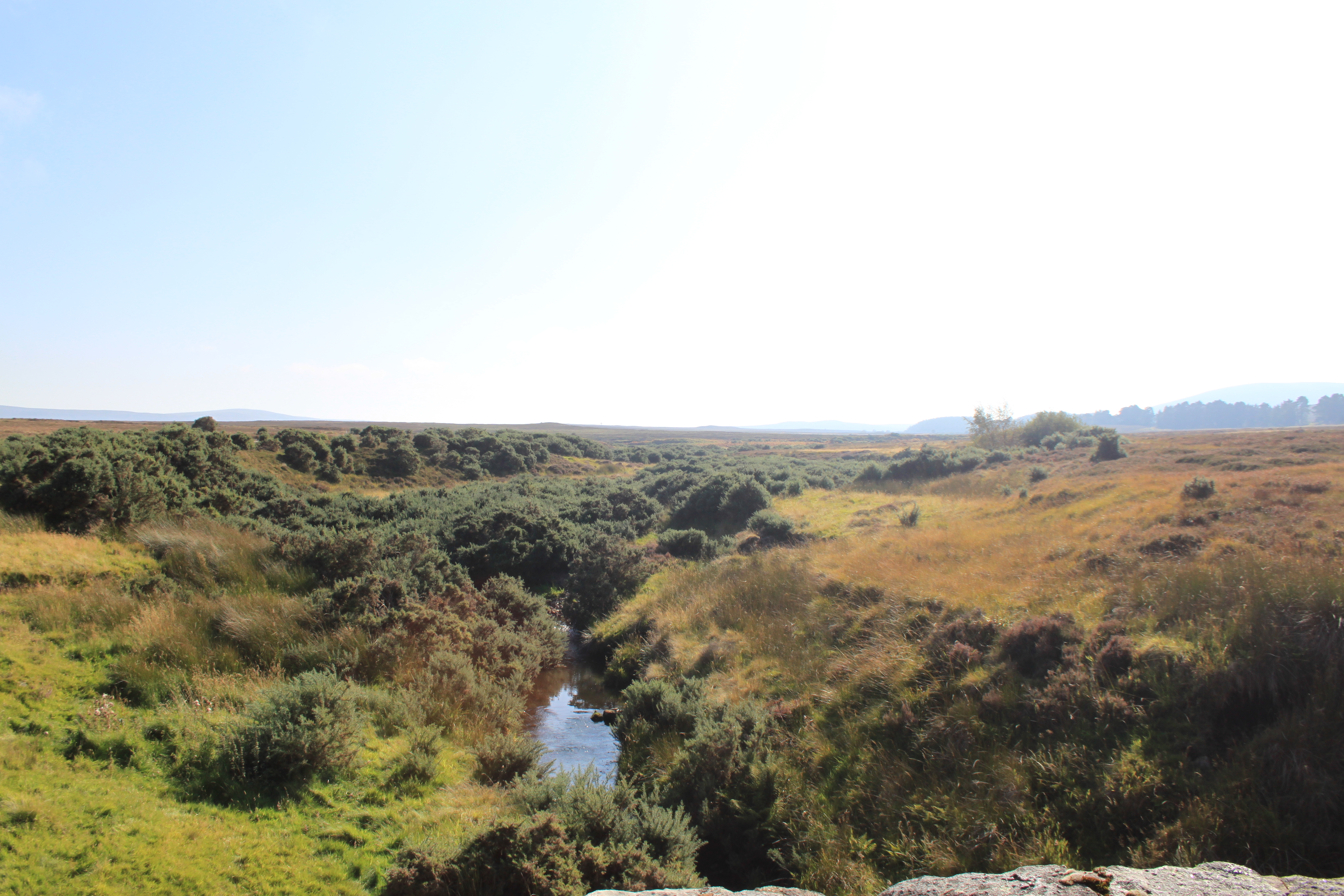
Burn of Aulthaunachan, one of the tributaries of River Divie.
