= River Findhorn =

River in Scotland

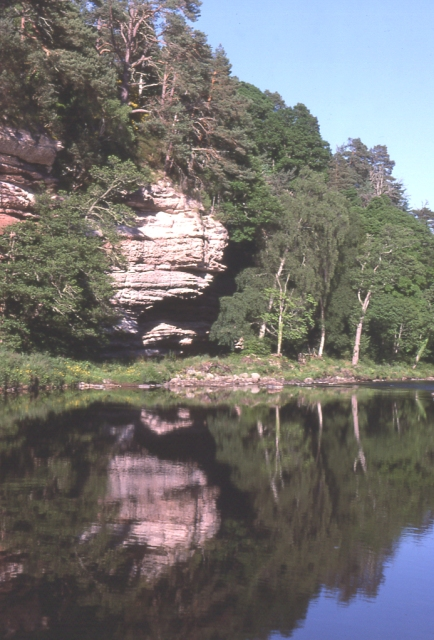
- Sandstone cliffs at Sluie

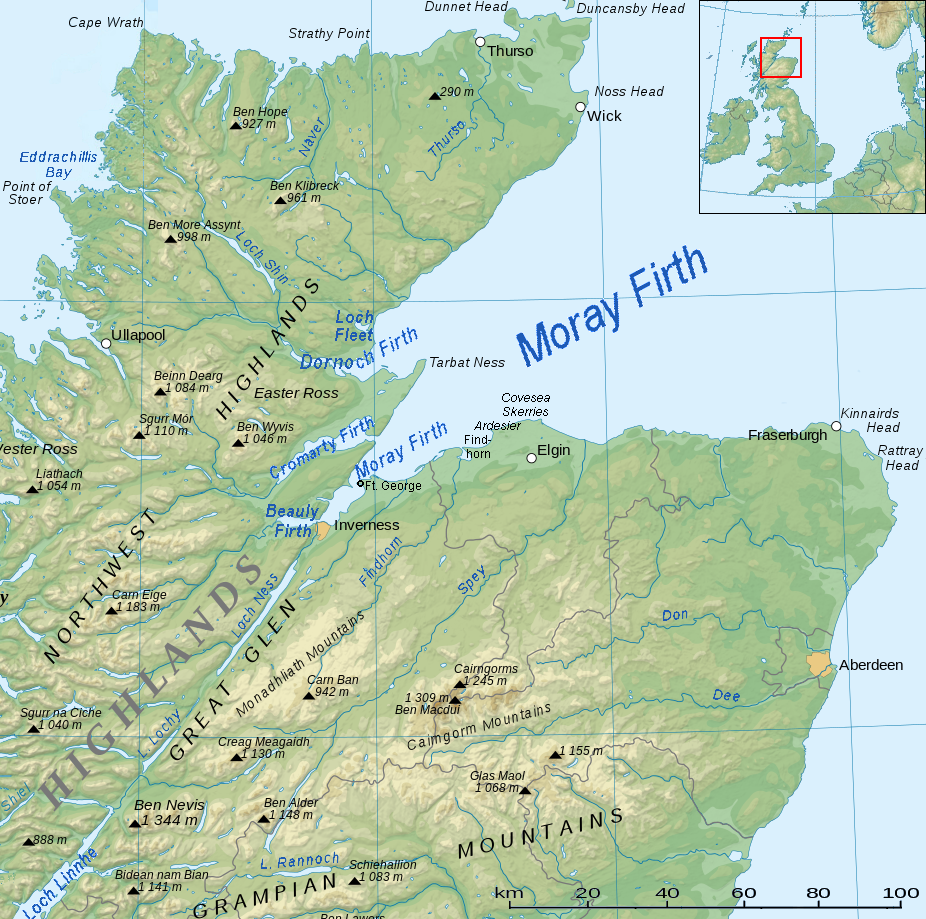
- Topographic map of northern Scotland with the River Findhorn at centre
- Native name: Uisge Éire (Scottish Gaelic)

Location
- Country: Scotland
- State: Moray
- Region: Highland

Physical characteristics
- Source
  - coordinates: 57°10′51″N 4°13′51″W
  - elevation: 500 metres
- Mouth
  - coordinates: 57°39′38″N 3°37′38″W
  - elevation: Sea level
- Length: 100 kilometres (62 mi)
- Discharge
  - location: Findhorn Bay

Basin features
- Landmarks: Dunearn, Randolph's Leap, Sueno's Stone, Forres
- Tributaries
  - left: Allt Creagach, Glenmazaran Burn, Funtack Burn, Carnoch Burn, Muckle Burn
  - right: River Eskin, Abhainn Cro-chlach, Elrick Burn, Allt Bruachaig, Tor Burn, River Divie, Mosset Burn, Kinloss Burn

The River Findhorn (Scottish Gaelic: Uisge Éire) is one of the longest rivers in Scotland. Located in the north east, it flows into the Moray Firth on the north coast. It has one of the largest non-firth estuaries in Scotland.

The river is c. 100 kilometres (62 mi) long (Note: Various similar lengths are quoted e.g. 100km.) and the catchment area is 1,300 square kilometres (500 sq mi)

The river provides excellent salmon and trout fishing and is popular with anglers from around the globe. It is also one of Scotland's classic white water kayaking rivers (varying from grade 2 to 4) and draws canoeists from across the country.

== Name ==
The Findhorn is known in Gaelic as the Éire, while its valley, Strathdearn, is known as Srath Éireann. The name Éire or Éireann was also borne by the Deveron to the east, and the two rivers were distinguished as Fionn-Éireann and Dubh-Éireann (incorporating the Gaelic words for "white" and "black", and giving rise to the English names). Éire is identical in form to the Gaelic name for Ireland, and an old saying played upon this by comparing the five divisions of Strathdearn to the five Irish provinces. (Note: The saying goes: Tha cóig cóigimh an Éirinn is tha cóig cóigimh an Srath Éireann, ach is fearr aon chóigeamh na h-Éireann na cóig cóigimh Srath Éireann. "There are five fifths in Ireland and five fifths in Ireland's strath [Strathdearn], but better is one fifth of Ireland than the five fifths of Ireland's strath.") It is likely pre-Celtic in origin, however, which would make the similarity coincidental.

== Course ==
The Findhorn rises in the Coignafearn Forest north of the main massif of the Monadhliath Mountains, several streams joining together near the Dalbeg bothy to form it. The westernmost of these is the River Eskin which flows down through a small valley surrounded by the heights of Càrn a' Choire Sheilich 791 metres (2,595 ft), Càrn nan Làraiche Maoile 809 metres (2,654 ft) and Càrn na Saobhaidh 766 metres (2,513 ft). To the south west the Abhainn Cro-chlach takes a direct route along a narrow and steep-sided defile that carries its waters from Carn Odhar na Criche 895 metres (2,936 ft) and Càrn Bàn 942 metres (3,091 ft). The two join by a small bridge in the heart of the Coignafearn Forest (which is a Scottish deer forest and devoid of trees). Arguably this is the point, some 500 metres (1,600 ft) above sea level, at which the Findhorn itself is born but less than kilometre downstream the Allt Creagach joins them at Dalbeg and from here on this is unquestionably the Findhorn River. Strathdearn descends from here in a southwesterly direction until the river reaches its outlet to the Moray Firth.

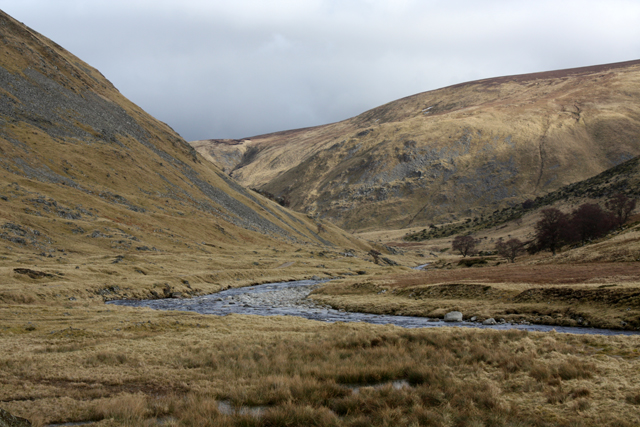
Findhorn River near its headwaters in the Coignafearn deer forest

In its upper reaches the river is unusually sinuous, being an incised meandering river valley very little altered by glaciers. The next tributary to join the flow is the Elrick Burn, a substantial rivulet whose head waters are in the Monadhliaths east of the Abhainn Cro-chlach. Its confluence with the Findhorn is just south of the Coignafearn Lodge. 2 kilometres (1.2 mi) further east is the first wooded area of the valley, on the left bank below Creag Irealis and just upstream from Coignafearn Old Lodge. Some 4 kilometres (2.5 mi) downstream beyond the cliffs of Creag Dubh the valley takes on a definitely wooded appearance, although the surrounding hills remain bare heather moor.

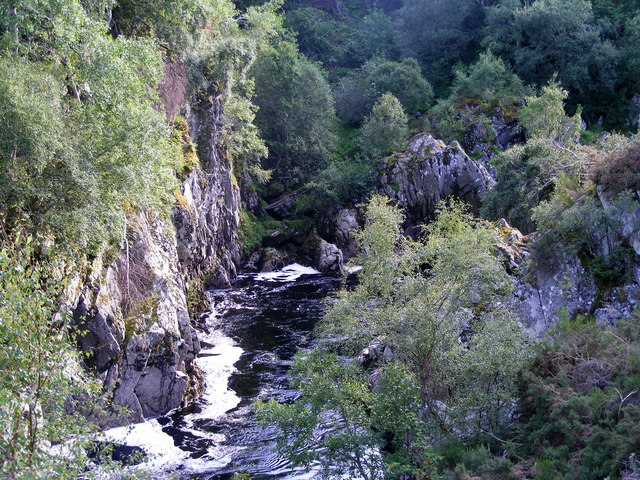
Gorge at Dulsie Bridge

The Glenmazaran Burn is the next tributary on the right bank, and various farms and lodges provide habitation from here throughout most of the river's remaining length. Tomatin is the first settlement of any size on the river's banks and here the waters pass under both the Highland Main Line railway and the A9 road. Just beyond this the Allt Bruachaig tumbles down from the heights of the Slochd Mor and joins the Findhorn on its right bank. Here the river takes its only major bend, a lazy S-shape over a 5 kilometres (3.1 mi) stretch at the end of which the Funtack Burn, which drains Loch Moy to the north, joins the Findhorn's left bank. Beyond this point the character of the landscape changes again as the river enters the Streens gorge. This 7 kilometres (4.3 mi) long defile has no metalled road, is largely treeless and almost completely uninhabited.

At Drynachan lodge the valley reverts to its earlier wooded and inhabited character and roads again follow its course almost all the way to the sea. The river is joined by the Carnoch Burn and flows almost due east from here, passing the 200 metres (660 ft) contour, and then shortly afterwards it is met by the Tor Burn on the right bank. This stream is only about 1 kilometre (0.62 mi) long, being formed by the confluence of the Rhilean and Leonach Burns, which flow through moorland before cascading down narrow gorges and over waterfalls in their final sections. There is a small, wooded river island in the Findhorn at the point at which it is joined by the Tor Burn - one of the few such islands along its length, none of which are named by the Ordnance Survey. Next, the river reaches the remains of the hillfort of Dunearn just south of Dulsie Bridge. Here the Findhorn turns northwards and flows through a sinuous and narrow gorge with Glenferness House on the right bank and the Ardclach bell tower on the left, after which it reverts to a generally north-westerly course once it passes under the A939 bridge.

Beyond Relugas the Findhorn is joined by the River Divie at the beauty spot of Randolph's Leap. The Divie's head waters lie in the hills to the south of the prominent Knock of Braemoray, and shortly before its confluence with the Findhorn it is itself joined by the Dorback Burn, which is fed by Lochindorb. Hereafter the waters provide kayaking opportunities for the experienced for the next 4 kilometres (2.5 mi)

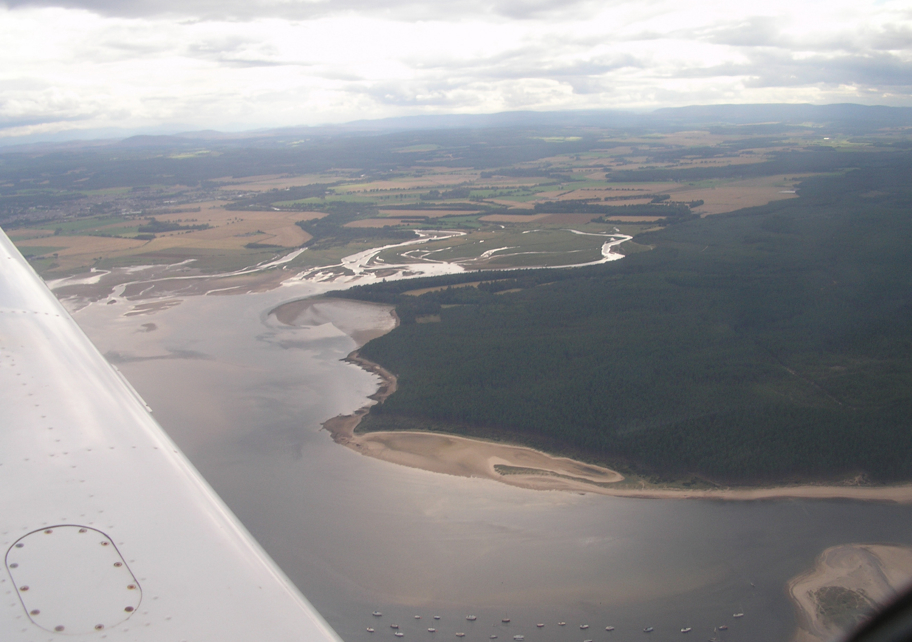
Findhorn Bay from the air with the channel of the River Findhorn at top centre and the Muckle Burn at top right

Further downstream the Findhorn passes Logie House, the ruined hill fort of Dun Earn, (Note: The small fort of Dun Earn is not to be confused with its larger neighbour of Dunearn. Rather confusingly, Dun Earn sits above the Dunearn Burn near its confluence with the Findhorn about 12 kilometres (7.5 mi) downstream from Dunearn.) Sluie Walk where it crosses the 100 metres (330 ft) contour, the Altyre estate and the Meads of St John before reaching the hamlet of Mundole just outside the town of Forres, which is by far the largest settlement on the river's route. Passing under the Findhorn Bridge on the A96 and the main Inverness to Aberdeen railway line the river finally reaches relatively flat land just 3 kilometres (1.9 mi) before it reaches Findhorn Bay. This is a large tidal basin and at low water the river is joined by the Muckle, Mosset and Kinloss Burns as it flows unimpeded over its sands. The combined streams flow on to the north with the village and military base of Kinloss to the right, crossing the bay and passing Findhorn Ecovillage and the harbour of the village of Findhorn before exiting the bay through a narrow, sandy channel and entering the Moray Firth with the Culbin Forest on the left. At higher stages of the tide the riverine waters mix with the incoming sea, creating a brackish lagoon.

== Geology and geomorphology ==
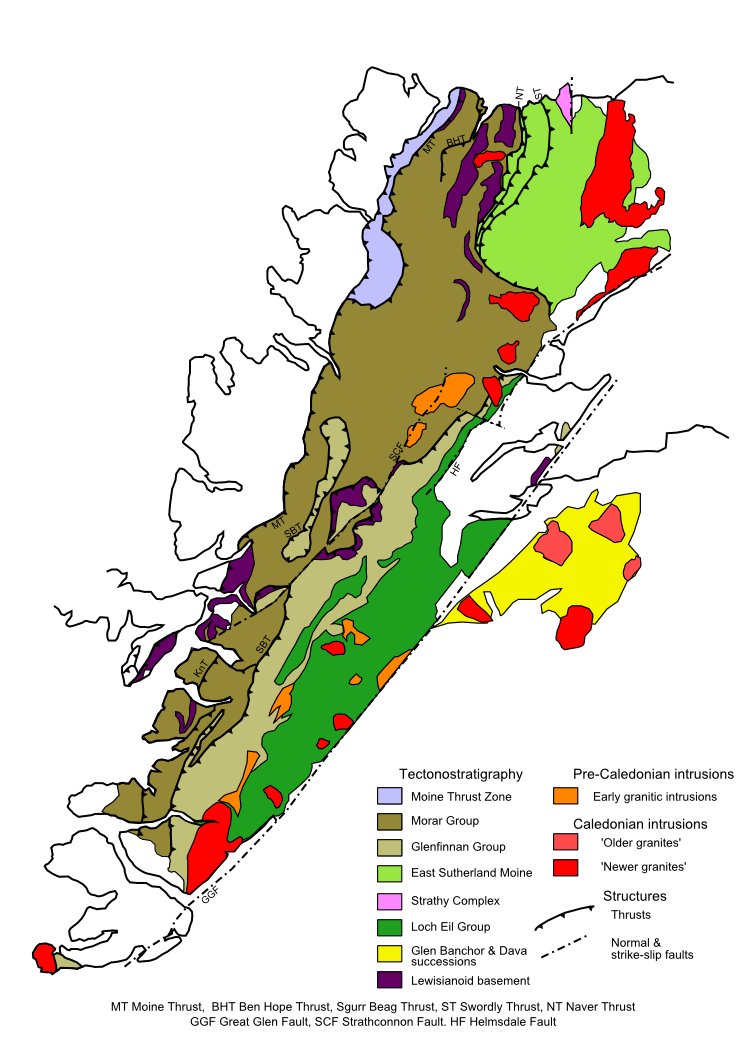
Map of the distribution of the Moine Supergroup on mainland Scotland and the Inner Hebrides

During the Caledonian orogeny, some 500 mya, much of the land that is now northern Scotland was subject to folding and metamorphosis and then intruded with granite magma which contributed to the uplift of the area and ultimately the creation of the Grampian Mountains of which the Monadliaths that form the head waters of the river Findhorn are a part. The bedrock of the upper Findhorn is largely made up of the Grampian Division of the Moine Supergroup, a formation that stretched from south of Forres to Lochindorb and beyond. These rocks are typically metamorphosed sediments of sandstone that are rich in quartz mixed with some shale and mudstone that date from circa 750 mya. The schists that underlay the Streens in the middle reaches of the Findhorn were once thought to be part of the younger Dalriadan Supergroup but are now considered to be Moinian as well. The Grampian Slide is a zone of shearing between the younger Grampian Division and the older Central Highland Division.

In the lower Findhorn the bedrock is Old Red Sandstone that was deposited after the Caledonian orogeny. The rapid uplift of the mountain terrain to the south was accompanied by similarly rapid river erosion that resulted in sediment being spread throughout the Moray Firth basin and further north to Orkney and Shetland some 360–400 mya. At this time the land lay some 20 degrees south of the equator and experienced a semi-arid climate.

During the Tertiary period some 65–50 mya volcanic activity on what is now the west coast of Scotland resulted in considerable uplift there and the creation of the slope that dips in an easterly direction that the modern Findhorn River follows.

With the onset of Pleistocene glacial period some 2 mya the whole of northern Scotland became ice bound. For example, the Cairngorm mountains immediately to the south of the Findhorn valley became covered in ice some 1,800 metres (5,900 ft) thick. The melting of the ice, which occurred comparatively rapidly, resulted in "vast volumes of meltwater" creating further erosional and depositional features, such as river terraces in the middle reaches of the Findhorn and moraines such as the Cluny hills downstream.

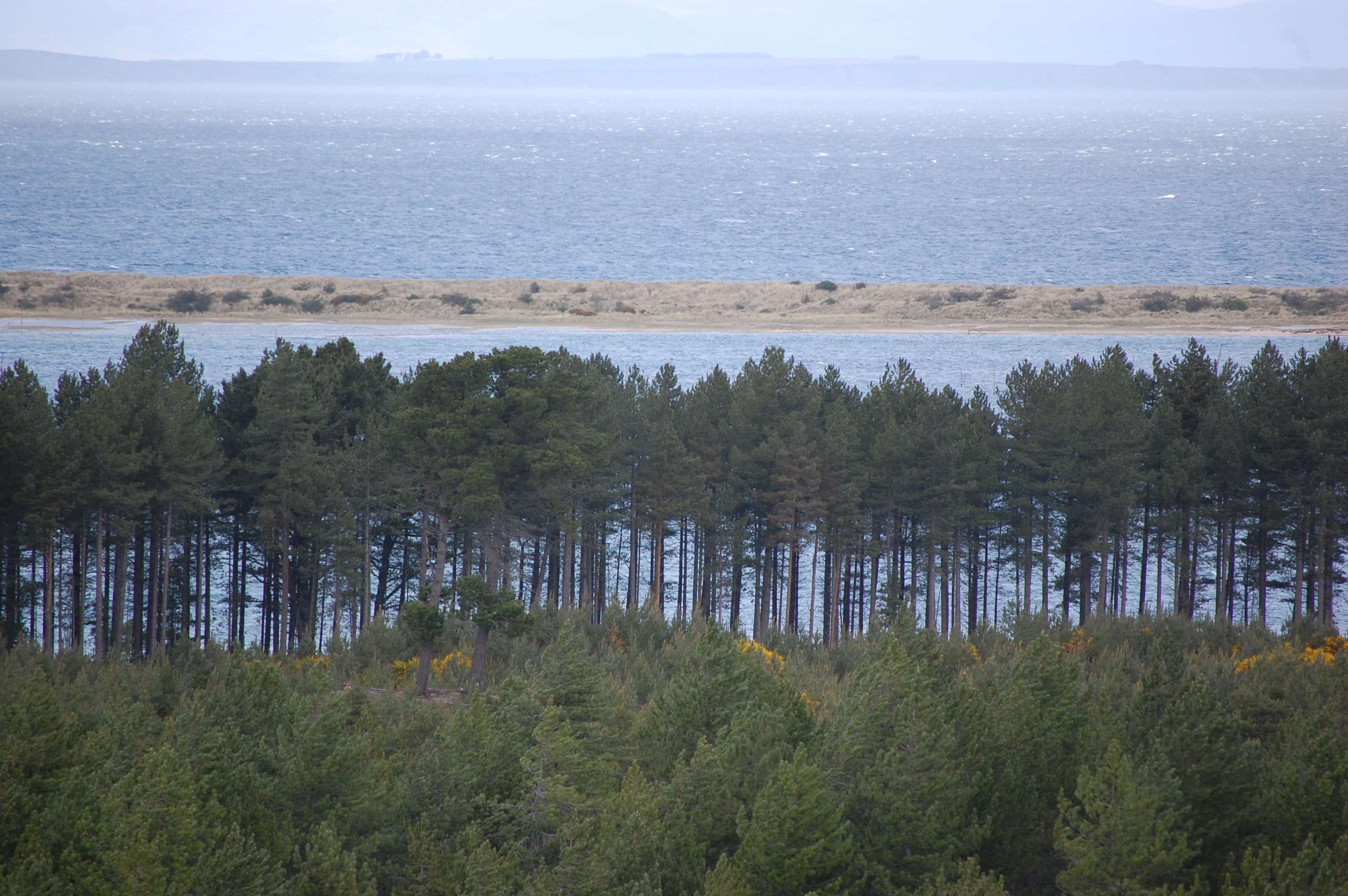
Looking from the Culbin forest towards the shifting coastal sand bars with the Moray Firth beyond

The great weight of the ice depressed the land surface and with the end of the glacial period there resulted both sea level rises and isostatic rebound of the land which combined with periodic uplifts resulted in a complex interplay of land and sea with a prominent raised shoreline between Nairn and Forres that skirts the Culbin Forest.

However, the shores have not been static even in historic times. The earliest detailed map of the Findhorn estuary dates from 1590 and was made by Timothy Pont. It shows a long sand bar stretching west from the site of the village of Findhorn along the Culbin shore. In 1701 this bar was described as being 6 miles (9.7 km) long after it was breached by the sea close its eastern edge. At this point what is now the Culbin Forest on the river's left bank was a sandy waste with dunes reaching to 30 metres (98 ft) in height and the river channel through Findhorn Bay was slowly shallowing due to the wind-blown sands. Noticing the erosion to the bar, on which the village had been built, the inhabitants gradually deserted this site and moved to a new location about 1.6 kilometres (0.99 mi) to the south east, where the modern village now stands.

== Iron Age settlement ==
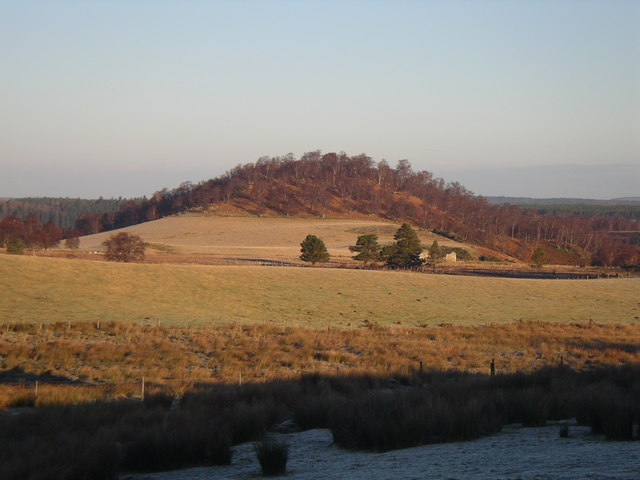
Dunearn hill fort

Dunearn (near Dulsie Bridge), Doune of Relugas, Dun Earn (by Conicavel) and Cluny Hill in Forres are all Iron Age hillforts.

Doune of Relugas is at 120 metres (390 ft) AOD and had a timber-laced rampart enclosing an area measuring 53 metres (174 ft) by 33 metres (108 ft). Although 2.5 kilometres (1.6 mi) downstream Dun Earn lies about 20 metres (66 ft) higher than Doune of Relugas and encloses a larger area. Dunearn's enclosed area is roughly .75 hectares (1.9 acres) in extent. The existence of the hillfort at Cluny Hill, which extended to 3.6 hectares (8.9 acres), was only confirmed in 2017.

Rodney's Stone is a Pictish cross slab symbol stone in the grounds of Brodie Castle that was discovered in the Dyke churchyard in 1781.

== Medieval period ==
Sueno's Stone is a Picto-Scottish Class III standing stone on the north-easterly edge of Forres. It is the largest surviving Pictish stone of its type and stands at over 6.5 metres (21 ft) high.

Forres Castle stood on the east bank of the Mosset Burn. (Note: By the mid-18th century very little remained of the old Royal castle and in 1835 its site was marked by a granite obelisk.) It may have been the place where King Dub was murdered in 966. Forres was a Royal Burgh from an unknown early date – the original charter having been lost and then renewed in 1496. Kinloss Abbey was founded in 1150 under the rule of the Cistercian order but only ruins now remain, Alexander Brodie of Lethen having reduced it for its stones in 1651. (Note: Some of the abbey stones were used for a new "place of worship", others went into the construction of Cromwell's citadel in Inverness. (McKean's wording suggests the stones were used for Inverness Castle, a quite different structure.))

In 1303 Edward I of England stayed at Lochindorb castle for a month during his military occupation of Scotland. Originally built by the Comyns, the structure sat on an island in the loch. Perhaps the most notorious resident of the Findhorn valley was Alexander Stewart, the Wolf of Badenoch, who was based at the castle and who burned Forres, Pluscarden Abbey and Elgin in 1390. In 1455 it was reduced by the Thane of Cawdor on the orders of James II and only the outer walls now remain.

== Modern era ==
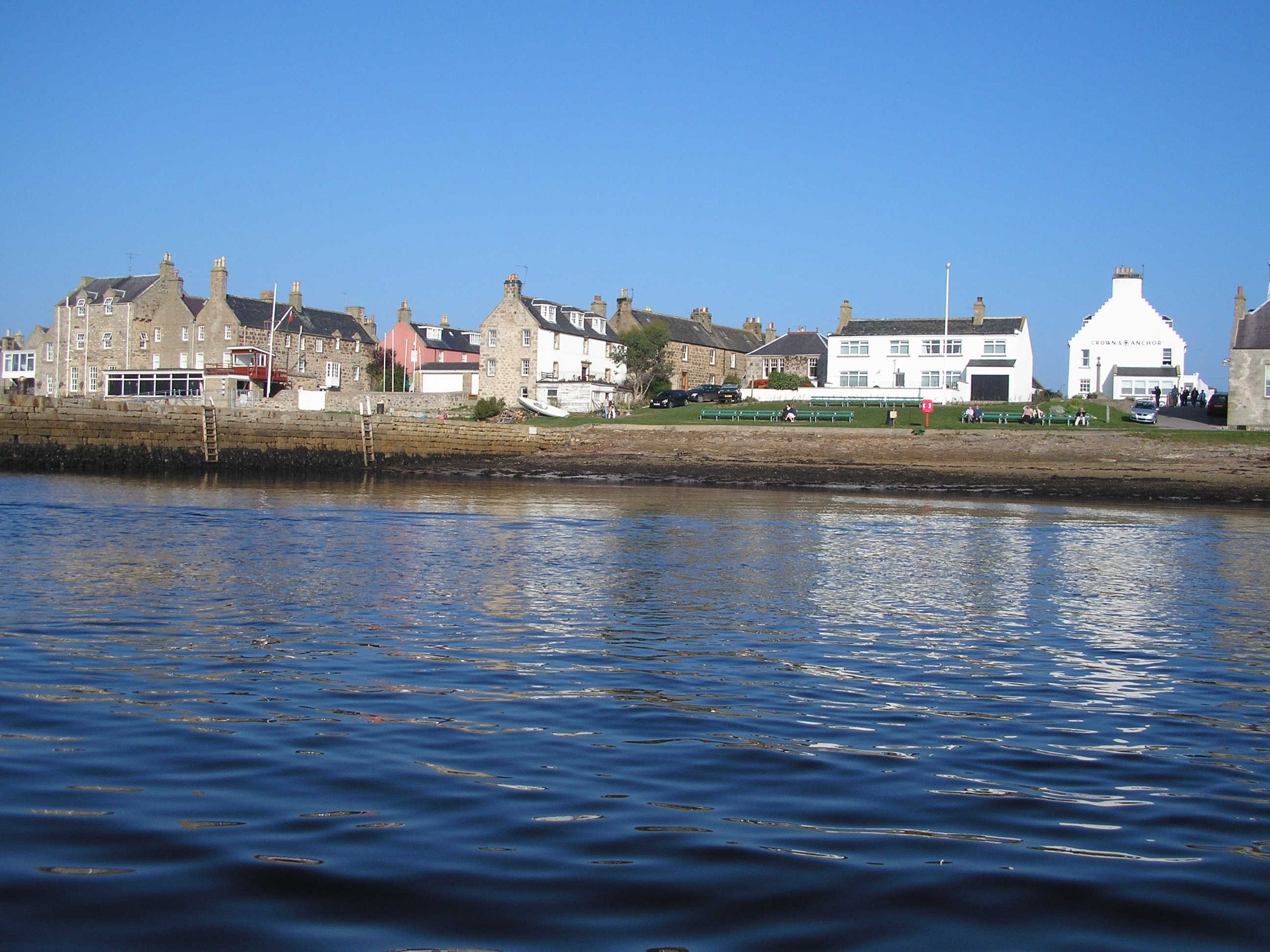
The village of Findhorn

Various places are claimed to have been where the last wolf in Scotland was slain. One such story is that of a deer stalker called MacQueen who shot one on Clan Mackintosh land in the Findhorn valley in 1743. In the wake of the 1745 Jacobite rebellion the French brigantine Le Bien Trouvé slipped past a British blockade in March 1746 into Findhorn Bay. The bay was too shallow for larger British frigates and sloops and although HMS Hawk opened fire no damage was caused. On the night of 6 April the Frenchman slipped out again carrying Bonnie Prince Charlie's aide-de-camp Richard Warren and escaped safely to Dunkirk.

The Findhorn valley was badly affected by the Highland Clearances "which had a tragic impact not only upon remote glens but also upon the Moray Firth as a whole. From it arose the lamentations of a whole people... They had been taught to see themselves as the descendants of 'conquerors' who had won an inalienable right to the land in which they were settled. To them the rebuke of the Canadian Boat Song was well merited". (Note: Graham then quotes these lines from the song: We ne'er shall tread the fancy-haunted valley, Where 'tween the dark hills creeps the small clear stream, In arms around the patriarch banner rally, Nor see the moon on royal tombstones gleam When the bold kindred, in the time long vanish'd, Conquered the soil and fortified the keep, No seer foretold the children would be banish'd That a degenerate lord might boast his sheep.)

If the clearances were a man-made travail, the Muckle Spate of 1829 was a natural disaster unparalleled in the historic record of the Findhorn. On 3 August of that year heavy rain in the Cairngorms resulted in flooding in the catchment of several rivers in north-east Scotland and that of the Findhorn has been described as "the most severe catastrophic flood in modern UK history". Based on the eyewitness accounts recorded by Sir Thomas Dick Lauder (who was also the author of a romantic history about the life of the "Wolf of Badenoch") were able to determine peak flows down the main river of up to 1,484 m^{3}/s and 451 m^{3}/s on the Divie. Lauder describes numerous incidents including the daring rescues of those trapped by the floods on the plain of Forres by fishermen from Findhorn village. It is at Randolph's Leap that the Findhorn river is at its most spectacular in spate. Here there are two markers indicating the height the river reached in 1829 and it is said that the butler at nearby Relugas caught a salmon 50 feet (15 m) above the normal river level in his umbrella. (Note: Across the north-east six individuals lost their lives, 22 bridges and 60 houses were destroyed and 600 families were made homeless.)

Between 1919 and 1963 the Forestry Commission planted some 2,560 hectares (6,300 acres) of trees on the Culbin sands and created what is now an extensive conifer plantation. During the early 21st century Moray Council undertook a flood prevention scheme on the Mosset Burn to protect the town of Forres up to a standard of a 1 in 100 years event. The principal component of the project is a 3.8 million m^{3} flood storage reservoir at Chapelton to the south of the town.

== Notable buildings ==
The Findhorn valley has a wide variety of listed buildings, several of which are the main residence of Highland estates. These include Dunphail House, on the River Divie, built on the site of a 14th-century castle, the white harled and crowstepped Logie House near Randolph's Leap, Darnaway Castle with its 15th-century Earl Randolph's Hall, described as "unique in non-Royal castles" and Altyre, which has a 19th-century Italianate farm steading, " now used by Glasgow School of Art. Brodie Castle, which lies to the west in the vale of the Muckle Burn, has large formal gardens and was visited by Robert Burns in 1787.

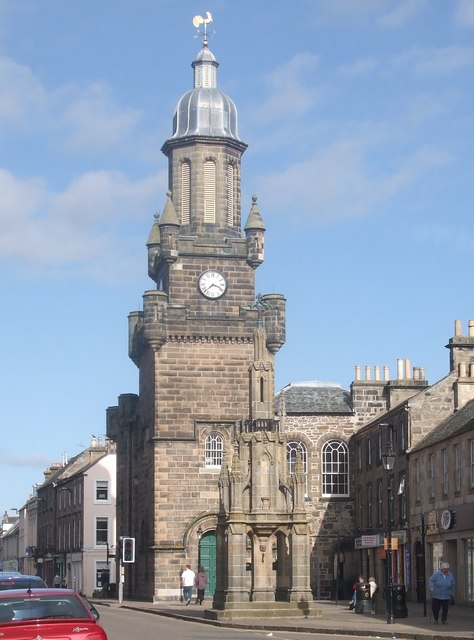
Forres Tolbooth

Forres Tolbooth on the High Street was erected in 1838, but replaced an earlier tolbooth of a similar design on the same site. Cluny Hill College, originally a hydropathic hotel dates to 1863 and "has a rambling skyline of dutch gables, ordinary gables, chimneys, parapets and bays". The octagonal Nelson's Tower on the summit of the nearby Cluny Hills is a prominent landmark that was erected in 1806 to celebrate Nelson’s victory at Trafalgar.

The Universal Hall is an arts and conference centre at Findhorn Ecovillage that enjoys a stained glass window by American artist James Hubbel. At the heart of the village of Findhorn are the 1739 Crown and Anchor Inn and Findhorn House, the home of the Royal Findhorn Yacht Club, which is an 18th-century house with late 19th-century enlargements.

== Ecology and leisure ==
Agriculture and forestry are practiced throughout the length of the land on the Findhorn's banks, but leisure activities are also an important aspect of the river and its catchment. On the high moors which are the source of the headwaters, red deer and grouse shooting are significant activities. Hill walking and bird watching are also important aspects of local tourism. Here, hardy plant species such as heather and Juniper thrive on the peaty soils and in the sheltered valley there are stands of Scots pine.

== See also ==
- Fauna of Scotland
- Flora of Scotland

The neighbouring:

- River Nairn to the west
- River Spey to the east.
