= Willett Pot Still Reserve =

Brand of a bourbon whiskey

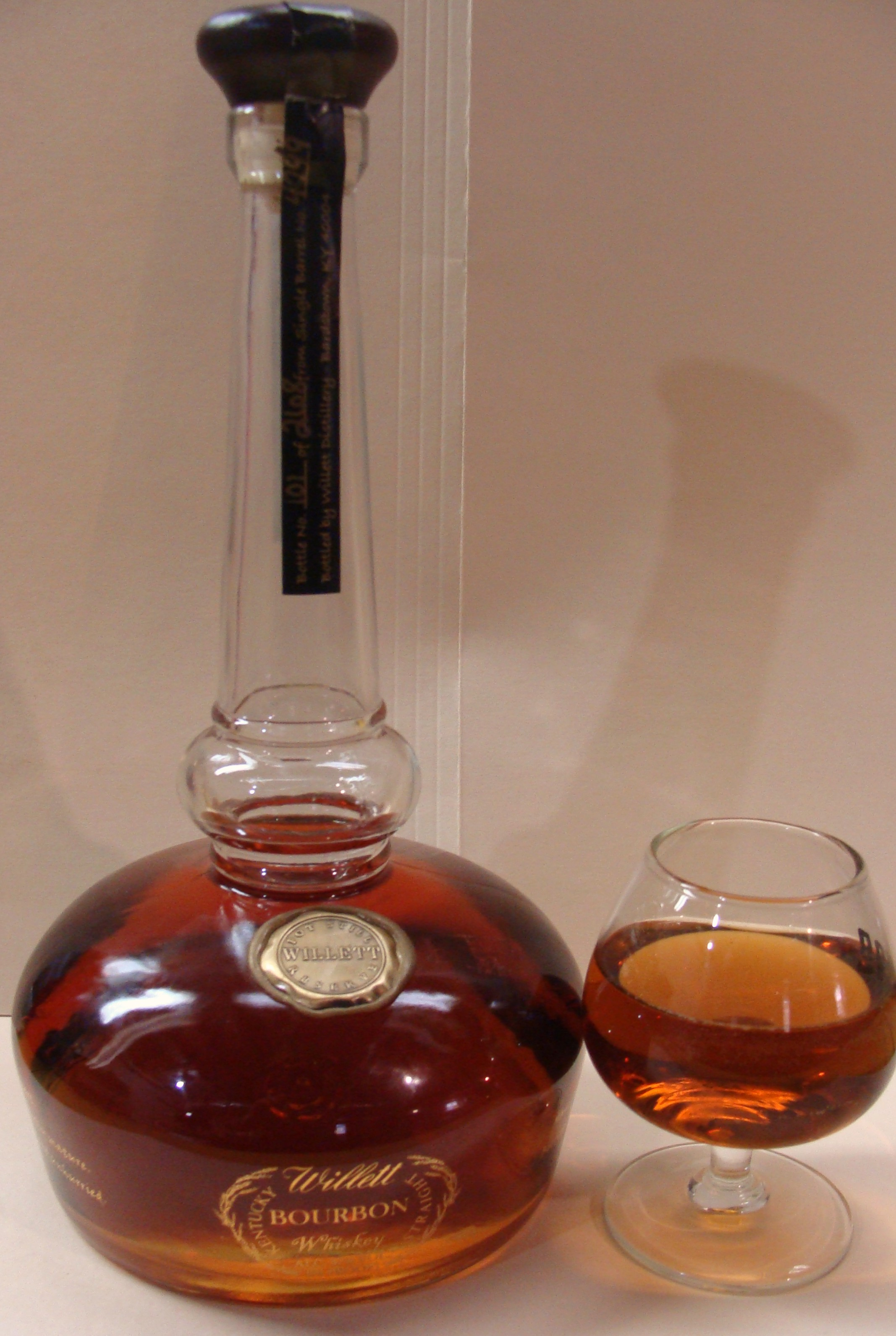
- Type: Bourbon whiskey
- Manufacturer: Willett Distillery
- Origin: Kentucky, United States
- Alcohol by volume: 47.00%
- Proof (US): 94
- Related products: Rowan's Creek, Noah's Mill, Johnny Drum, Kentucky Vintage

Willett Pot Still Reserve Bourbon is brand of a bourbon whiskey produced in Bardstown, Kentucky by the Willett Distillery.

It is a Kentucky straight bourbon whiskey brand introduced in 2008 and bottled at 47% abv, with 8–10 year aging. It is sold in glass 750 ml and 1.75 liter bottles. The company is identified on the product label as the Willett Distilling Company, which was the original name of the company until its name was changed in 1984 to Kentucky Bourbon Distillers, Ltd. (KBD). In October 2012, the company announced that it would return to using the Willett Distillery name as its primary business name. Recent bottlings are identified on the labels as a small batch bourbon, whereas it was originally released as a single barrel bourbon.

Willett Pot Still Reserve is bottled in a decorative decanter that received a "double gold" award for packaging design at the 2008 San Francisco World Spirits Competition. In addition to the double gold medal for packaging, the product was also awarded a gold medal for taste at the event.

Malt Advocate Magazine rated Willett Pot Still Reserve at 90 ("outstanding") on a 100-point rating scale in January 2008. It also included the brand in its 2008 Whisky Awards as one of the top ten new whiskies for 2008.

Although the company has had the word distillery or distillers in its name (and similarly uses "distilling company" in the various company names that it prints on labels), it did not actually operate as a distillery in the period between the early 1980s and January 2012. The company has been refurbishing and enhancing its prior distillery plant, and resumed limited test distilling on January 21, 2012 – with plans to support both column still and pot still distillation processes. However, since multi-year aging is required, their products will continue to use whiskey distilled elsewhere for some time to come. The company generally does not identify where in Kentucky its products are actually distilled, although it has been reported that most of their products have been distilled by the Heaven Hill Distillery, which has its company headquarters located close to the Willett Distillery Company. The two companies are located about a half mile from each other along the same road in Bardstown, Kentucky.

== Product name and history ==
Although the product has the term pot still in its name, it has been reported that the initial distillation process for the product was performed using the more common column still distillation method – with a pot still used only for the doubler stage.

The product is named after the Willett family which founded the company that produces it. The company began as the Willett Distilling Company. John David Willett (born in 1841) had been the master distiller for the Moore, Willett & Frenke Distillery, which he had formed with his brother-in-law Thomas S. Moore of Bardstown, and a Mr. Frenke of Louisville. In 1876, Willett fell ill and sold his interest in the company. The resulting company became the Mattingly Moore Distillery. John David Willett would, however, live on for another 38 years after this transaction. He died in 1914.

Starting at the age of 15 with a five-year stint at the Mattingly Moore Distillery, his son A. Lambert Willett (born in 1883) picked up his father's profession. Lambert Willett then worked for the Max Selliger & Co. Distillery for twenty years – eventually becoming one-third owner and superintendent of the plant. A. L. "Thompson" Willett, Lambert's son (born in 1909), also joined him at the plant as assistant superintendent. Lambert Willett later purchased a farm and, together with his sons and especially led by Thompson Willett, founded the Willett Distilling Company on the site. Thompson and Lambert Willett used John David Willett's bourbon recipes as the basis of the whiskey that they would distill there and brand as "Old Bardstown".

The construction of the Willett Distilling Company began in the spring of 1935 (just after the 1933 repeal of alcohol prohibition in the United States), and the company produced its first batch of 300 bushels (about 30 barrels) on March 17, 1936. Five years after founding the Willett Distilling Company, Lambert Willett left Max Selliger & Co. to pursue the family business full-time. Lambert Willett and at least four of his sons held substantial positions of responsibility at the company. Lambert Willett died in 1970.

A. L. "Thompson" Willett, the son of Lambert Willett, was the president of the Willett Distilling Company. At one time, he was also the president of the Kentucky Distillers Association, and he also held a number of other positions of prominence in the community. Thompson Willett's daughter Martha Harriet Willett and other members of her generation of the family worked for the company as well, and in 1972 she married Even (pronounced Evan) G. Kulsveen of Hamar, Norway, who would later purchase the company.

During the 1970s energy crisis, the company switched from producing whiskey to producing ethanol for gasohol fuel. This strategy soon failed when fuel prices returned to lower levels, and the distilling facilities were completely shut down in the early 1980s.

Kulsveen purchased the company and the property on July 1, 1984, and renamed the company to Kentucky Bourbon Distillers (KBD), Ltd. For some time, KBD continued to produce bourbon from the aging barrels that the Willett distillery had produced before they had stopped distilling. However, as time moved on, KBD increasingly began to purchase its bourbon from other distilleries and operate as an independent bottling company. Kulsveen continues to operate the facility to this day, and the next generation of the family, including their son E. A. "Drew" Kuslveen and their son's wife Janelle, their daughter K. M.-B. "Britt" Chavanne and her husband Hunter Chavanne, are also now involved in the company. Drew Kulsveen manages production, his wife Janelle runs the gift shop and tasting room, and Britt Chavanne runs day-to-day operations, and Hunter Chavanne covers sales and marketing.

The company introduced the Willett Pot Still Reserve bourbon brand in 2008. It was originally a single barrel bourbon. Each bottle was sealed with a label identifying the individual aging barrel, the number of the bottle within the series of bottles for that barrel, and the total number of bottles from the barrel (example: "Bottle No. 116 of 242 from Single Barrel 149"). However, at some point in time roughly around 2015, it stopped being a single barrel brand and became a small batch brand instead. The bottles as still sealed with a paper labeling strip, but they no longer carry bottle numbers (example: "Small Batch Bourbon made in Kentucky – Batch No. 16A3"). For its definition of the term "small batch", the company said in 2011 that it used at most 12 barrels per batch for its "small batch" brands.

The company also makes another brand of whiskey with a similar name – called Willett Family Reserve. The Family Reserve brand is a limited-production barrel proof single barrel whiskey produced in bottles that resemble wine bottles in shape. (Several other brands produced by Willett, such as Rowan's Creek and Noah's Mill, also use wine-type bottle shapes.)

== See also ==
- Bardstown, Kentucky
- Bourbon whiskey
- Column still
- Kentucky Bourbon Distillers
- Pot still
- Single barrel whiskey
- Small batch whiskey
- Straight whiskey
