= Single barrel whiskey =

Whiskey from a single aging barrel

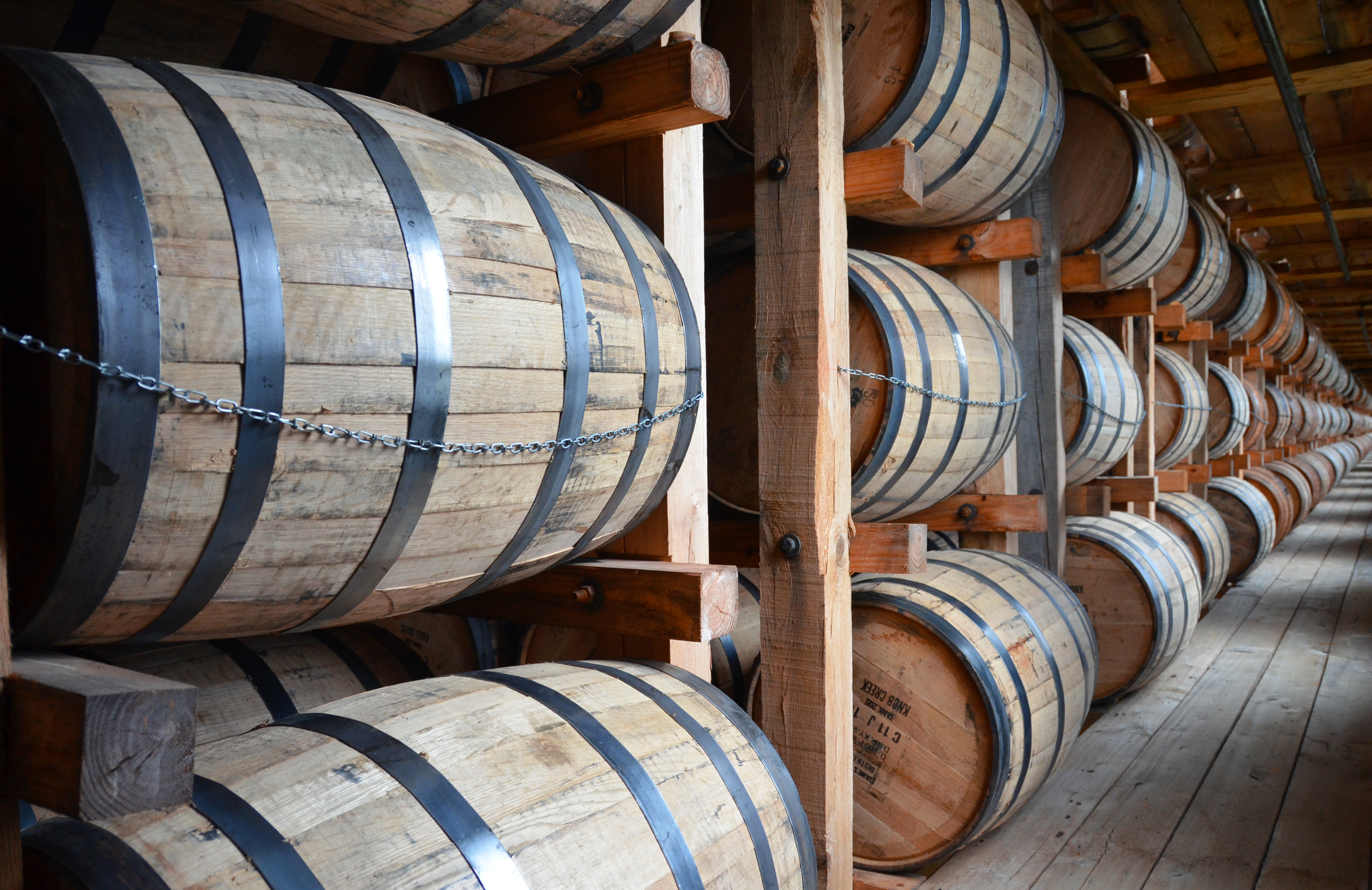
Barrels of whiskey aging in a rick house. Most brands are a blend of multiple barrels, but whiskey may be bottled from a single barrel.

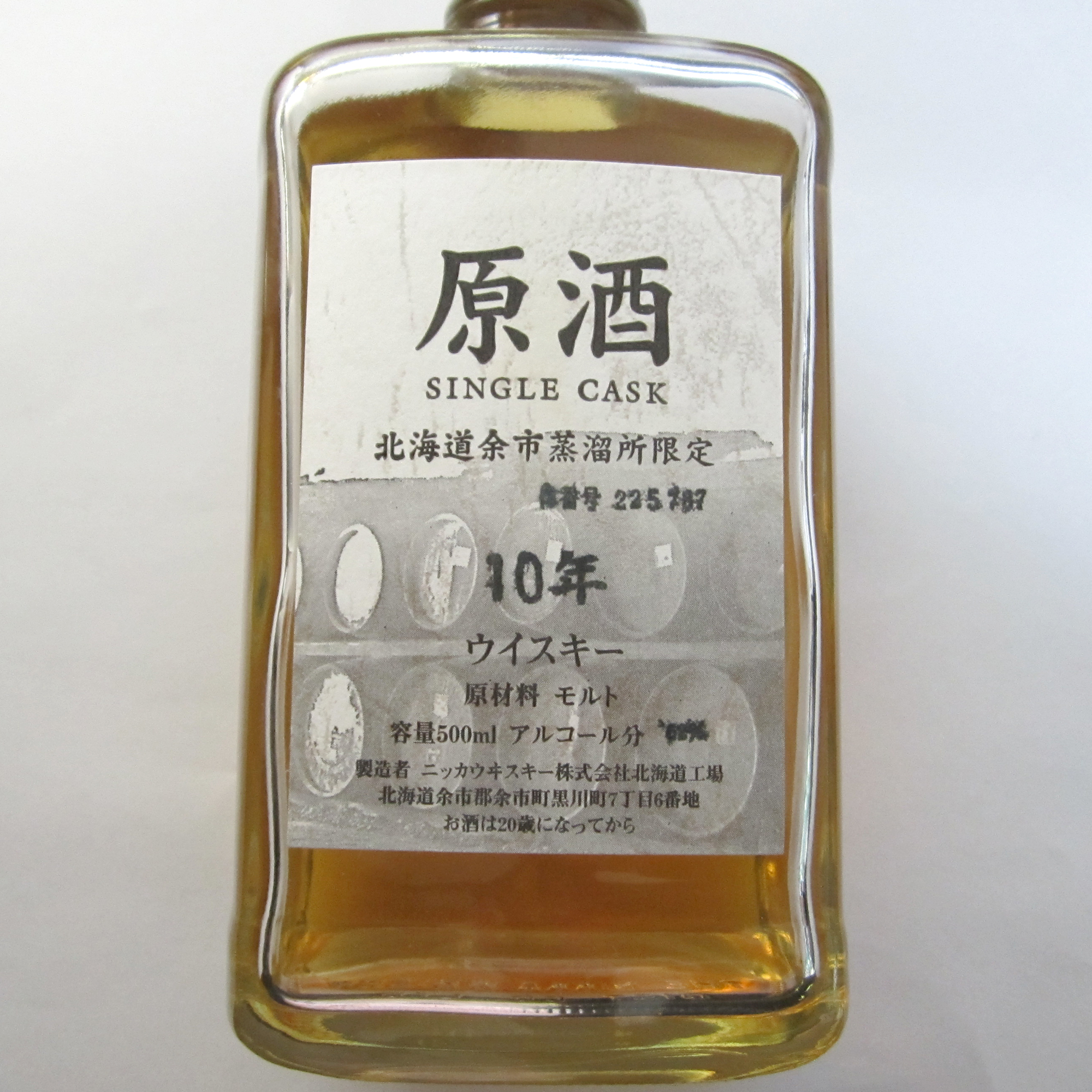
Bottle of Yoichi 10 Year Single Cask

Single barrel whiskey (or single cask whiskey) is a premium class of whiskey in which each bottle comes from an individual aging barrel, instead of coming from blending together the contents of various barrels to provide uniformity of color and taste. By contrast, some other whiskeys, even ones that are not blends, may be combined from more than one batch, or even from differing years to achieve consistency. The whiskey from each barrel is bottled separately, with each bottle bearing the barrel number and in most cases the dates for the beginning and end of aging. Each barrel is believed to contribute unique characteristics to the finished whiskey.

There has been some recent controversy over whether single cask whiskeys are indeed all from single casks. Whiskeys sold by Scottish distilleries such as Ben Nevis and GlenDronach as "single casks" have been revealed to be vattings of multiple barrels, which may have been of different kinds, with the "single cask" designation referring only to the final cask for maturation. In the absence of specific regulation regarding this language, it is not clear to what extent this practice is prevalent in the industry as a whole.

Single barrels may further be at cask strength or non-chill-filtered to further avoid adulterating the taste of a cask.

== Brands ==
The following is a list of some single barrel whiskeys:

=== Scotch ===
- Balvenie (has released several single cask bottlings of single malt Scotch whisky)
- Glenfarclas (The Family Casks series)
- Many independent bottlers of single malt Scotch whisky produce single cask offerings
  - Berry Brothers & Rudd
  - Scotch Malt Whisky Society

=== North American ===
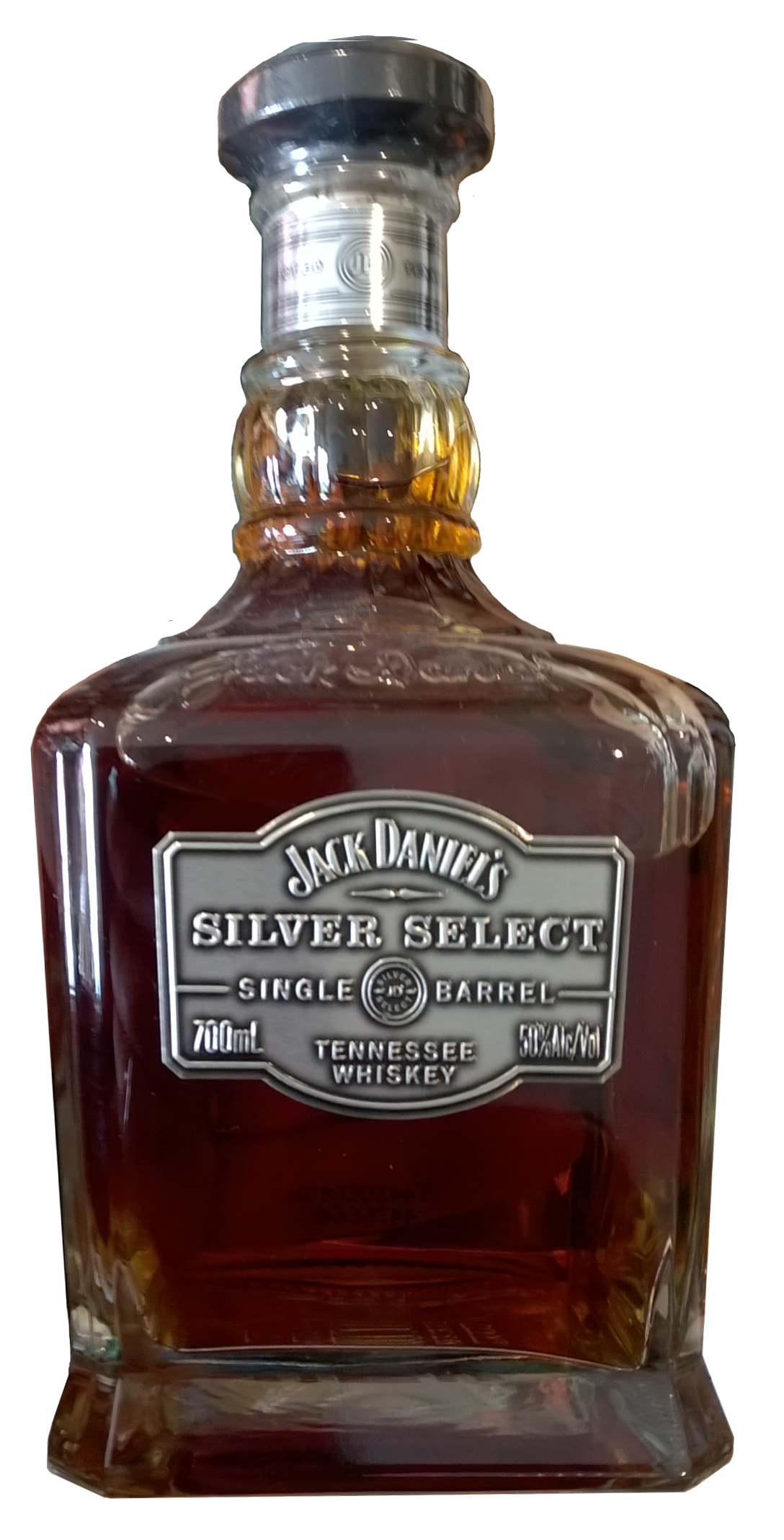
A bottle of Jack Daniel's Silver Select Single Barrel Tennessee Whiskey

- Buffalo Trace Distillery (a Sazerac Company distillery)
  - Blanton's (a single barrel Bourbon)
  - Eagle Rare (a Bourbon brand which has 10, 12, and 17-year single barrel expressions)
  - Rock Hill Farms (a single barrel bourbon)
- Heaven Hill
  - Elijah Craig (a bourbon brand which has multiple single barrel expressions)
  - Evan Williams (a single barrel vintage bourbon)
  - Henry McKenna (10-year bonded single barrel)
- Jack Daniel's Distillery (a Brown-Forman Corporation distillery)
  - Jack Daniel's Single Barrel (a single barrel Tennessee whiskey)
  - Jack Daniel's Silver Select (available at duty-free shops)
- Jim Beam (has released a single barrel bourbon)
- Kentucky Bourbon Distillers (an independent bottling company)
  - Michter's (a brand which has single barrel bourbon and rye expressions)
  - Willett Pot Still Reserve (a single barrel bourbon)
  - Willett Family Estate (single barrel bourbon and rye)
- Knob Creek Distillery (a Beam Inc. distillery)
  - Knob Creek Single Barrel Reserve (a bourbon aged 9 years)
- Four Roses Distillery (offers single barrel bourbon)

== See also ==
- Bottled in bond
- Single malt whisky
- Small batch whiskey
- Outline of whisky
