= Willett Distillery =

American company

- Type: Private
- Industry: Drink industry
- Founded: 1936
- Founder: A. Lambert Willett and sons (esp. A. L. "Thompson" Willett)
- Headquarters: Bardstown, Kentucky
- Key people: Even G. Kulsveen; Martha H. Kulsveen (née Willett); E. A. "Drew" Kulsveen; Janelle Kulsveen; K. M.-B. "Britt" Kulsveen
- Products: bourbon and rye whiskey
- Website: www.kentuckybourbonwhiskey.com

Willett Distillery Ltd, is a private family-owned and operated company located on the outskirts of Bardstown, Kentucky, on a site that began as a farm owned by the Willett family. Over the years, the company has bottled whiskeys that range from two years of aging maturity up to 28 years. The company was named Kentucky Bourbon Distillers (KBD) between 1984 and 2012.

== History ==
=== Origins and background (1841–1935) ===
The company was founded as the Willett Distilling Company in 1936. The company has remained under family ownership and operation at the same location since it was created

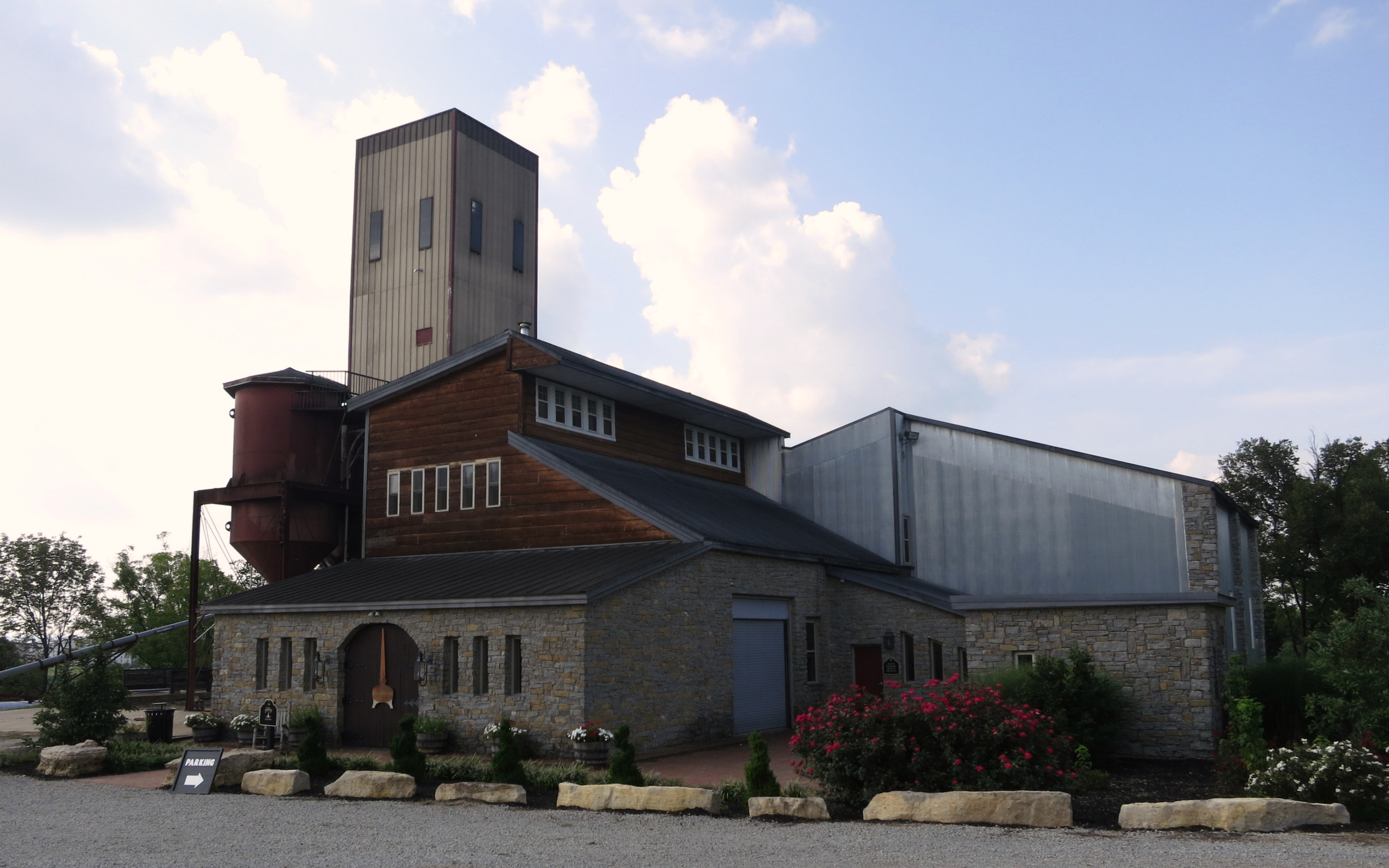

John David Willett (born in 1841) had been the master distiller for the Moore, Willett & Frenke Distillery, which he had formed with his brother-in-law Thomas S. Moore of Bardstown, and a Mr. Frenke of Louisville. In 1876, Willett fell ill and sold his interest in the company (he would recover and live another 38 years, passing in 1914).

John's son A. Lambert Willett picked up his father's profession in 1898, at the age of 15, with a five-year stint at the Mattingly Moore Distillery. Lambert Willett then worked for the Max Selliger & Co. Distillery for twenty years – eventually becoming one-third owner and superintendent of the plant.

A. L. "Thompson" Willett, Lambert's son (born in 1909), also joined him at the plant as assistant superintendent. Lambert Willett later purchased a farm and, together with his sons and especially led by Thompson Willett, founded the Willett Distilling Company on the site. Thompson and Lambert Willett used John David Willett's bourbon recipes as the basis of the Old Bardstown whiskey brand.

=== Founding and early operations (1936–1940s) ===
The construction of the Willett Distilling Company began in the spring of 1936 (soon after the 1933 repeal of alcohol prohibition in the United States), and the company produced its first batch of 300 bushels (about 30 barrels) on March 17, 1937. Lambert Willett and at least four of his sons held substantial positions of responsibility at the company.

=== Post war growth and leadership (1950s–1970s) ===
Lambert Willett died in 1970. A. L. "Thompson" Willett was the president of the company until 1984. At one time, he was also the president of the Kentucky Distillers' Association and a member of the Nelson County Historical Society, where his interests included the early history of whiskey-making in Kentucky. Thompson Willett's legal name was actually the same as his father's, but he became known as "Thompson," using the maiden surname of his mother (née Mary Catherine Thompson) to distinguish himself.

Thompson Willett's daughter Martha Harriet Willett and some other members of her generation of the family worked for the company as well, and in 1972 she married Even (pronounced Evan) G. Kulsveen, formerly of Hamar, Norway, who had emigrated to the United States at the age of 14 and had been a merchant marine, chef, and glass decanter craftsman.

During the 1970s energy crisis, the company switched from producing whiskey to producing ethanol for gasohol fuel. This strategy soon failed when fuel prices returned to lower levels, and the distilling facilities were completely shut down in the early 1980s.

=== Acquisition and KBD era (1980s–2011) ===
Kulsveen and his wife purchased the company and the property on July 1, 1984, and renamed the company to Kentucky Bourbon Distillers (KBD), Ltd., registered distillery number DSP-KY-78. For some time, KBD continued to produce bourbon from the aging barrels that the Willett distillery had produced before they had stopped distilling. KBD then increasingly began to purchase its bourbon from other distilleries and operate as an independent bottling company, and restocked its barrel aging facilities with purchased barrels. The next generation of the family, particularly their son E. A. "Drew" Kulsveen and his wife Janelle, their daughter Kristin Martha-Britt "Britt" Kulsveen and her husband Hunter Chavanne, have since taken over the primary roles at the company. Drew Kulsveen is the current Master Distiller and manages production, Janelle Kulsveen runs the gift shop and tasting room, and Britt Kulsveen runs day-to-day operations.). KBD started refurbishing and enhancing its prior distillery plant, and began limited test distilling on January 21, 2012.

=== Return to distilling and brand restoration (2012–2017) ===
In 2012, the company reintroduced Willett Distillery as its primary operating name. Later that year, Willett rejoined the Kentucky Distillers' Association after decades of absence.

In October 2012, the distillery was added to the Kentucky Bourbon Trail's inaugural "Craft Tour", which highlighted smaller-scale and independent distilleries. In December 2015, the distillery was elevated to the association's new "Proof" membership level, reflecting its production scale and aging inventory.

=== Leadership updates and expansions (2018–2022) ===
On June 14, 2018, the company announced the promotion of Britt Kulsveen to President and Chief Whiskey Officer, replacing her mother Martha Harriett Willett Kulsveen as President. Even Kulsveen holds the title of Executive Director.

In September 2019, Willett Distillery opened an on-site bar and small-plate restaurant called The Bar at Willett.

On September 19, 2019, Even Kulsveen was inducted into the Kentucky Bourbon Hall of Fame and recognized with a Parker Beam Lifetime Achievement Award by the KDA, who described Kulsveen as "a beloved icon who patiently resurrected one of the state's most historic distilleries and returned the family-owned brand to global prominence".

In October 2021, Willett Distillery partnered with rock band Kings of Leon, releasing a limited edition Bourbon and rye whiskey collection.

As of 2022 or possibly earlier, Britt Kulsveen became a member of the Kentucky Distillers' Association's board of directors.

In December 2022, Kentucky Governor Andy Beshear announced that Willett Distillery would invest nearly $93 million to build warehouses and other production facilities and create 35 new jobs in Springfield, Kentucky. In June 2025, the company entered its first-ever long-term brand partnership with Binder's Stash, another Kentucky Whiskey company.

== Production ==
In addition to its own brands, Willett Distillery also operates as a contract bottler for various brands owned and marketed by others.

Many of the brands that are owned by Willett Distillery do not actually identify Willett Distillery as the producing company on their labels. Instead, the company does business under various fictitious company names. These other business names often correspond to the bottling brand names such as the Old Bardstown Distilling Company for the Old Bardstown bourbon brand and the Noah's Mill Distilling Company for the Noah's Mill bourbon brand.

The company does not identify specifically where in Kentucky its products are distilled, although it has been suggested that most of their products have been distilled by the Heaven Hill Distillery, which has its company headquarters located close to Willett Distillery. The two companies are located about a half mile from each other along the same road in Bardstown, Kentucky.

For its new distilling operation, the company has three operating stills – a column still, a "doubler", and a pot still. The company has eight warehouses on site – each of which holds 5,000–6,000 barrels of whiskey for aging.

== Brands ==
The brands owned and marketed by Willett Distillery include the following:

- General market brands:
  - Johnny Drum bourbon
    - Green label 40–43% abv,
    - Private Stock label 50.5% abv, (No age statement)
  - Old Bardstown bourbon
    - Black label 43% abv, No age statement;
    - Gold label 40% abv, No age statement;
    - Estate Bottled label 50.5% abv, No age statement – the original Willett Distillery brand, first batch distilled 1937
    - Bottled In Bond 50% abv, No age statement although it is at least four years old as which is true with all spirits that are classified as being Bottled in bond
  - Vintage bourbon and rye (47% abv, various ages including 17, 21, and 23 years)
- Single barrel brands:
  - Willett Family Estate bourbon and rye (barrel proof, varying abv and aging, limited distribution)
- Small batch (at most 12 barrels per batch) collection:
  - Willett Pot Still Reserve bourbon (47% abv, No age statement, formerly a single-barrel brand) – introduced 2008; bottled in a decorative decanter that received a double gold award for packaging design at the 2008 San Francisco World Spirits Competition.
    (Although the product has the term pot still in its name, it has been reported that part of the distillation process for the product was performed using the more common column still distillation method—with a pot still used only for the doubler stage.)
  - Kentucky Vintage bourbon (45% abv, No age statement)
  - Noah's Mill bourbon (57.15% abv, No age statement)
  - Pure Kentucky XO bourbon (53.5% abv, No age statement)
  - Rowan's Creek bourbon (50.05% abv, No age statement) – This is Willett Distillery's best-selling brand, available in 27 states as of October 2011.
- Limited availability brands:
  - Corner Creek bourbon (44.3% abv, No age statement)
  - Kentucky Pride bourbon (45% abv, No age statement)
- Contract Brands: Willett Distillery also bottles and ages a number of brands under contract, including the bottling for such brands as:
  - Black Maple Hill small batch bourbon and rye (46.6% abv, 14 year aging, for CVI Brands)
  - Classic Cask small batch bourbon and rye (17-21 year aging, for Spirit Imports)
  - Conecuh Ridge small batch whiskey "distilled from bourbon mash" (45% abv, approximately 4 year aging, for Spirits Acquisition Corp.) – Note that under U.S. regulations a whiskey "distilled from bourbon mash" is similar to a bourbon, but is aged in used oak barrels rather than in new ones.
  - Michter's small batch and single barrel bourbon, rye, and bourbon-like unblended American whiskey
    (various abv and ages, for Chatham Imports)
  - Old Pogue small batch bourbon (45.5% abv, 9 year aging, for the Pogue family)

The company also occasionally releases various limited-edition special bottlings (often bottled under variations of the Willett brand name) for individual distributors. The XFC Exploratory Cask Finish launched in 2014 with a single-batch rye finished in Grand Marnier casks.

== Awards ==
Many of the company's brands have received awards at the annual San Francisco World Spirits Competition. These include Willett Pot Still Reserve (gold medal and double gold medal for packaging, 2009), Old Bardstown Gold, Black and Estate Bottled labels (each receiving a silver medal in 2012), Johnny Drum Private Stock (double gold medal, 2010), Johnny Drum Green and Black labels (each receiving a silver medal in 2012), Kentucky Vintage (double gold medal, 2005, silver medal, 2012), Noah's Mill (gold medal, 2005; double gold medal, 2011), Pure Kentucky XO (double gold medal, 2005, silver medal, 2012), and Rowan's Creek (gold medal, 2005; gold medal, 2011).

The Beverage Testing Institute rated Corner Creek bourbon at 92 in a 2010 tasting and Black Maple Hill rye at 95 in a 2008 tasting. Both of these ratings are in the range of 90–95, which the Institute refers to as "exceptional".

Malt Advocate Magazine rated Willett Family Reserve 22-year-old rye at 96 "a classic" (Vol. 18, #1), Willett Family Reserve 25-year-old bourbon at 95 "a classic" (Vol. 18, #1), Willett Family Reserve 23-year-old rye at 94 "outstanding" (Vol. 17, #2), Vintage 17-year-old bourbon at 92 "outstanding" (Vol. 15, #2), Rowan's Creek 12-year-old bourbon at 92 "outstanding" (Vol. 14, #2), Vintage 21-year-old rye at 91 "outstanding" (Vol. 15, #4), and Willett Pot Still Reserve at 90 "outstanding" (Vol. 17, #2).

In the 2011 edition of the Whisky Bible by Jim Murray, a Willett Aged 17 Years Barrel Proof was named a "World Whisky of the Year" (10–17 Years Single Barrel).

== See also ==
- Independent bottlers
- Single barrel whiskey
- Small batch whiskey
- List of historic whisky distilleries
