= Fog's End Distillery =

American distillery

Coordinates: 36.5070°N 121.4476°W

- Company type: LLC
- Founded: July 4, 2008
- Headquarters: Gonzales, California, USA
- Key people: Steven Wales & Henry Wales
- Products: Moonshine
- Website: Fog's End

Fog's End Distillery is one of the first pioneers in California's craft distilling movement. The distillery is located in Gonzales, California. The distillery produces a range of Craft spirits, under the direction of Head Distiller Henry Wales, and Steven Wales. Fog's End is known for producing award-winning small batch runs of Moonshine, Rum, and Gin.

== History ==
Fog's End Distillery originally started business as C&C Shine LLC. Craig Pakish subsequently bought out his partner and re-branded the business Fog's End Distillery. In his book, "Modern Moonshine Techniques", Bill Ownes presents C&C Shine as a how-to example start-up craft distillery on a shoestring budget. Craig Pakish started the distillery as a second career having retired from the Monterrey Sheriffs Department after 24 years on the force.

In 2020 Craig Pakish sold the business to cousins, Henry and Steven Wales.

== Production ==
As of 2013, the distillery operates a single 60-US-gallon (230 L; 50 imp gal) all copper still. The still is direct fired by natural gas. The design of the still is a traditional Arkansas Diamond type design. The wash uses is a traditional no-cook, sour-mash whiskey recipe.

== Awards ==
17 Mile Gin

- 2023 Gold Medal - San Francisco World Spirits Competition
- 2023 Gold Medal - 92 points - Bartender Spirit Awards

Whaler's Cove Silver Rum

- 2022 Silver Medal - San Francisco World Spirits Competition
- 2022 Silver Medal - 88 points - Bartender Spirit Awards

Fog's End Monterey Rye

- 2021 Gold Medal Rye Whiskey - TheFiftyBest.com
- 2019 Gold Medal Rye Whiskey - TheFiftyBest.com
- 2012 Beverage Tasting Institute's International Review of Spirits
- 2012 Silver Medal in Taste - MicroLiquor Spirit Awards

Fog's End California Moonshine

- 2017 Silver Medal - TheFiftyBest.com
- 2016 Silver Medal - Tastings.com

== Products ==
Current Spirits

- 17 Mile Gin - 85 Proof, Edinburgh-style sipping gin.
- Fog's End Monterey Rye - 90 Proof, Sour-Mash Whiskey.
- Fog's End Hand Craft Your Flavor - White Dog with a piece of the oak barrel so you become the "Master Distiller"
- Whaler's Cove Silver Rum - 90 Proof, High-quality rum agricole.

Discontinued Spirits

- Fog's End Distillery California Moonshine
- Fog's End White Dog Spirits
- Fog's End Primo Agua Ardiente
