= Single malt whisky =

Malt whisky from a single distillery

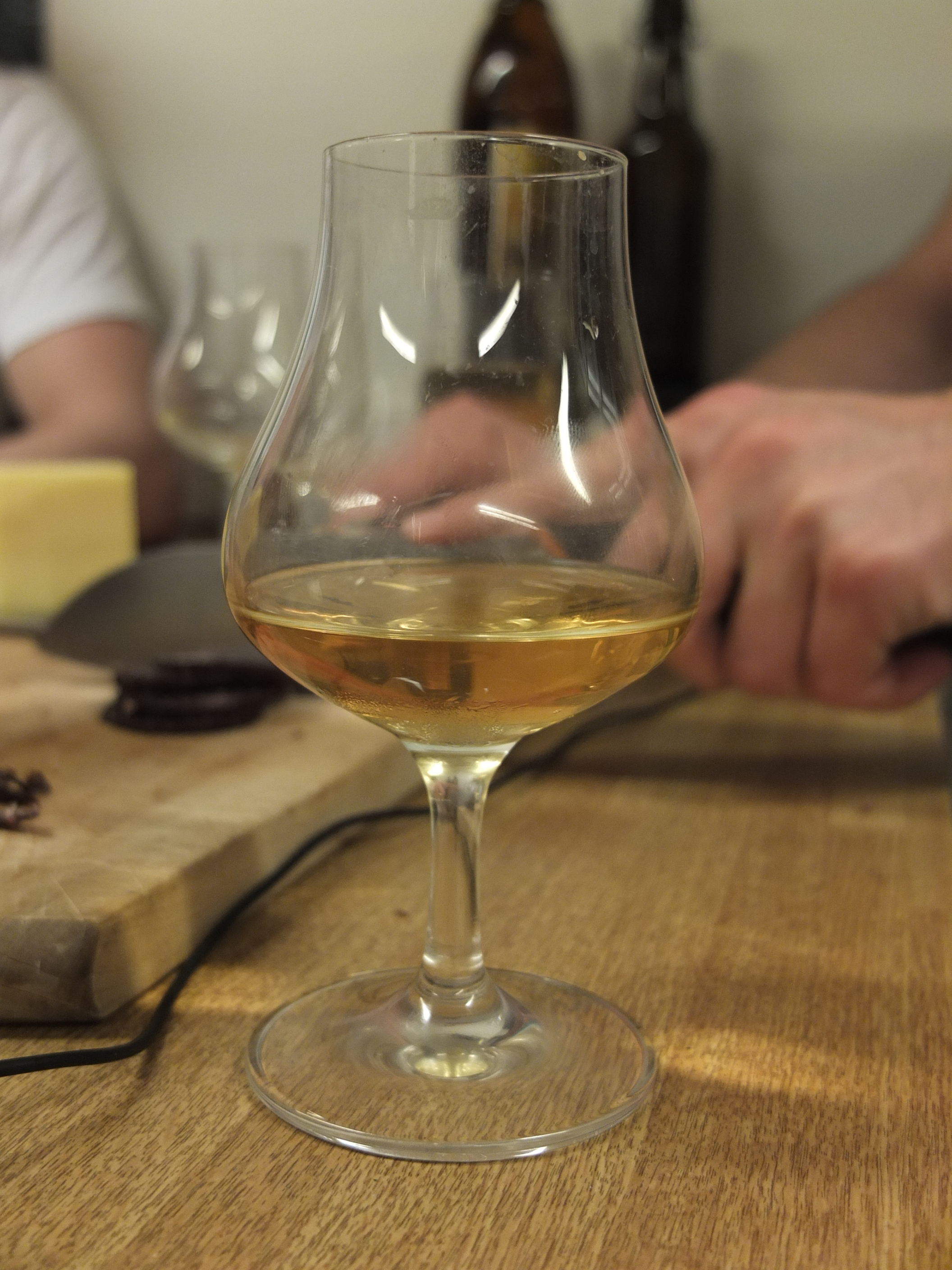
A glass of Bowmore 12-year-old single malt whisky

Single malt whisky is malt whisky from a single distillery.

Single malts are typically associated with single malt Scotch, though they are also produced in various other countries.

== National varieties ==
=== United Kingdom ===
==== Scotland ====
Under the United Kingdom's Scotch Whisky Regulations, a "Single Malt Scotch Whisky" must be made exclusively from malted barley (although the addition of E150A caramel colouring is allowed), must be distilled using pot stills at a single distillery, and must be aged for at least three years in oak casks of a capacity not exceeding 700 litres (150 imperial gallons; 180 US gallons).

Regulations in other countries largely follow the Scotch model, though permitted practices vary. For example, United States regulations state "[t]he adopted criteria for American single malt whisky specify that the product be a type of whisky that is mashed, distilled, and aged in the United States; is distilled entirely at one U.S. distillery; is distilled to a proof of 160 or less; is distilled from a fermented mash of 100 percent malted barley; is stored in oak barrels (used, uncharred new, or charred new) with a maximum capacity of 700 liters; and is bottled at not less than 80° proof. In addition, the criteria allow for the use of caramel coloring as long as its use is disclosed on the product label. The regulation will also allow the use of the term “Straight” for an American single malt whisky that is aged for at least two years."

==== England ====
English single malt is currently defined by the English whisky GI and British Standards Institute guidance (BS 8636).

The geographical indication (GI) for English whiskydefines English single malt as whisky produced from malted barley grown in the UK using English water, that is milled and fermented in England, batch-distilled in pot stills with sufficient copper contact at a single distillery in England to a strength of less than 94.8% ABV, matured in wooden casks (Note: There is no specific wood type specified.) of no more than 700 litres for a minimum of three years, and bottled at a minimum of 40% ABV with no added flavouring or additives other than E150 caramel colouring.

English single malt differs from traditional single malt production in several respects. Mashing and fermentation may take place away from the distillery though it must still occur in England, different types of stills may be used so long as there is sufficient copper contact, and any type of wooden cask may be employed for maturation. Differences in the rules governing single malt production, particularly those relating to mashing and fermentation, have given rise to a dispute between Scotch whisky and English whisky producers. and lead to an appeal being submitted to the First Tier Tribunal General Regulatory Chamber.

==== Wales ====
Welsh single malt whisky is defined by the Welsh single malt geographical indication (GI). It must be produced from malted barley and water sourced in Wales, and the whisky must be mashed and fermented, distilled, matured, and bottled entirely in Wales.

=== United States ===
Single malt whisky in the United States is defined by the Alcohol and Tobacco Tax and Trade Bureau (TTB). Under TTB regulations, U.S. single malt whisky must be produced from 100% malted barley grown in the United States and distilled to no more than 160 proof (80% ABV) at a single distillery in the country. The spirit is matured in used, charred new, or uncharred new oak barrels with a capacity of no more than 700 liters, all within the United States. No neutral spirits may be used in its production, and the only permitted additive is E150 caramel coloring, which must be disclosed on the label.

=== Denmark ===
Danish single malt whisky is defined by the Danish Whisky Manifesto, which was established on 16 April 2025 by ten Danish distilleries. According to the manifesto, Danish single malt must be mashed and fermented in Denmark, produced from 100% malted barley grown in Denmark, and matured for at least three years in wooden casks in Denmark. A variety of distillation methods are permitted. No additional sweeteners or other additives are allowed.

== Production ==
Barley, yeast, and water are the only ingredients required in the production of (barley-based) single malt whisky. All single malt goes through a similar batch production process.

There are several types of single malts available from distilleries including single barrel single malts which are the product of a single batch that was stored for three or more years in a single oak barrel. These single-barrel variants afford the opportunity for the consumer to see the influence of different types of storage on the same whisky (e.g., first-use bourbon whiskey barrels, port pipes, etc.). The more common form of single malt is a marrying at the bottling time of various batches that are mixed or vatted to achieve consistent flavours from one bottling run to the next.

=== Malting ===
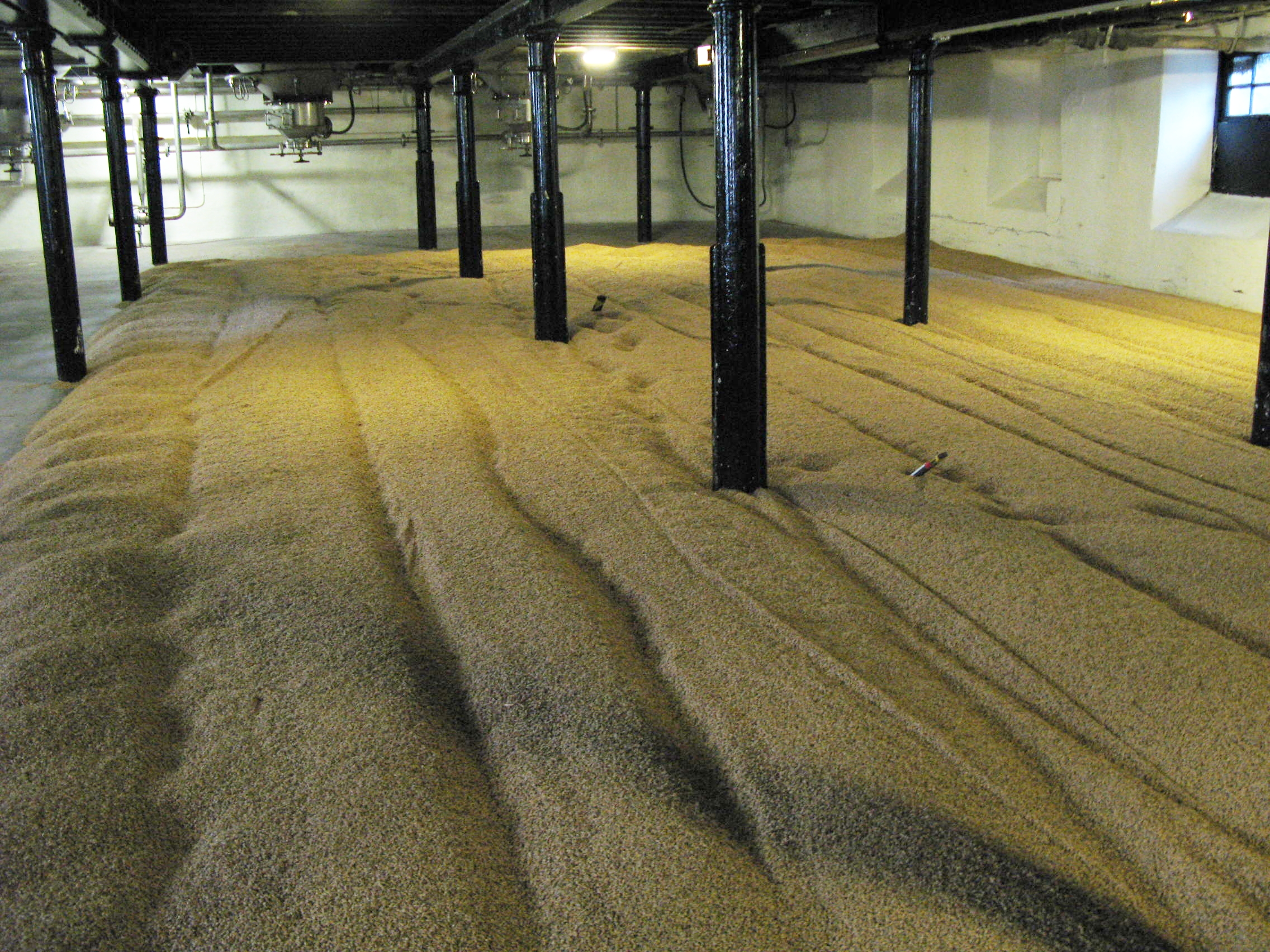
Malting floor at Highland Park Distillery.

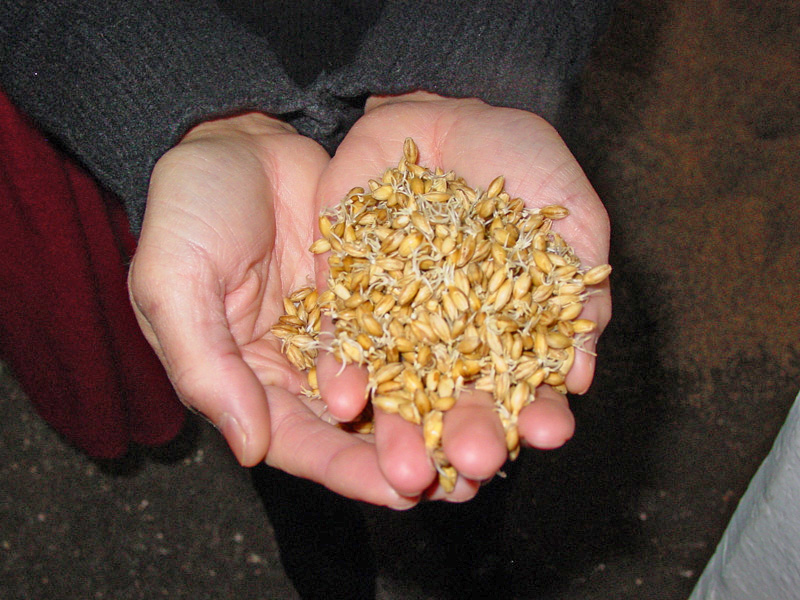
Malted barley.

Barley is "malted" by soaking the grain in water for two to three days and allowing it to germinate. This process releases enzymes, which convert unfermentable starch (which is insoluble in water and not available for fermentation by yeast) to fermentable sugars. Traditionally in Scotland, germinating seeds were laid on a malting floor and regularly turned. After three to five days, when the optimum amount of starch has been converted to fermentable sugars, germination is halted by heating the seeds with hot air.

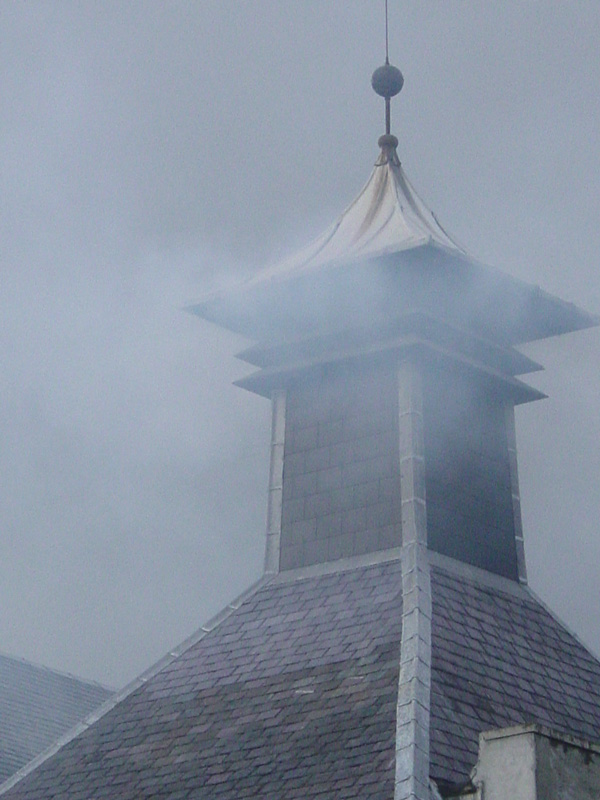
The distinctive "pagoda" chimney of a kiln at a distillery in Scotland.

Many distilleries once used a kiln to heat the germinated barley. The "pagoda roof" (many now false) that ventilated the malt kiln can still be seen at many distilleries both in Scotland and in other countries. However, most of the distilleries now use commercial "maltsters" to prepare their malt.

In most cases, some level of smoke from a peat-heated fire is introduced during heating to add phenols, a smoky aroma and flavour to the whisky. Some of the more intensely smoky malts have phenol levels between 25 and 50 parts per million (ppm). Islay malts have a reputation for being the peatiest. More subtle malts can have phenol levels of around 2–3 ppm. Entirely non-smoked (non-peated, unpeated) malts are made by the Glengoyne Distillery, which only uses hot air for drying.

=== Mashing ===
The malt is milled into coarse flour (grist) which is made of husks (20%), grits (70%), and flour (10%), to which three courses of hot water are added to extract the sugars.

The extraction is done in a large kettle (usually made of stainless steel) called a mash tun. At first, the hot water dissolves the sugars (maltose) and enzymes (diastase) in the grist. Then the enzymes act on the starch left over from the malting stage, continuing the conversion to sugar, and producing a sugary liquid called wort. Typically, each batch of grist is mashed three times or so to extract all the fermentable sugars. The first water is injected at about 60 °C, the second portion at about 72 °C and the third and final portion at about 88 °C. The wort from the first two water courses is drained into "washback" vessels for further processing, whereas the third course is retained as the first charge in the next batch.

=== Fermentation ===
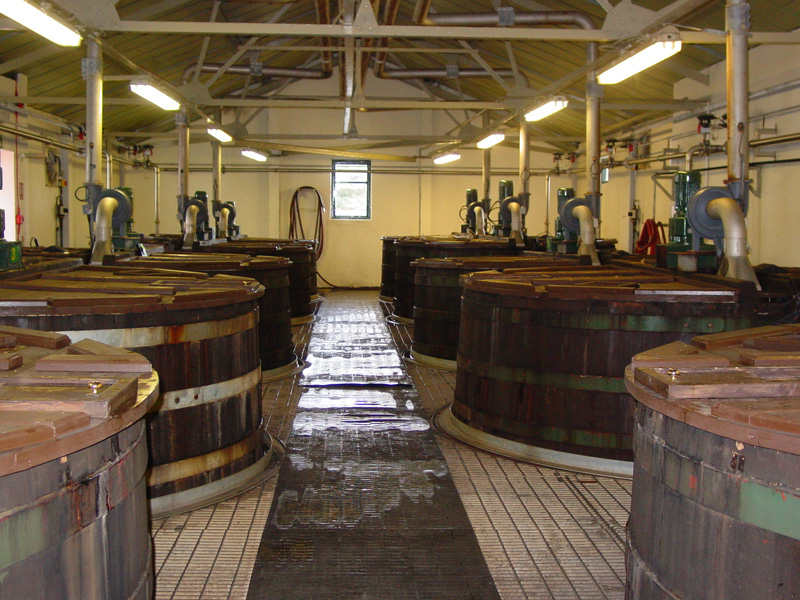
Yeast is used to ferment malted barley in washbacks.

Yeast is added to the wort in a large vessel called a washback, which may hold tens of thousands of litres. called a washback. Washbacks may be made of wood, such as Oregon pine or larch, or of stainless steel.. The yeast feeds on the sugars, and as a by-product, produces both carbon dioxide and alcohol. This process is called fermentation and can take up to three days to complete. When complete, the liquid has an alcohol content of 5 to 7% by volume and is now known as wash. Up until this point the process has been quite similar to the production of beer.

=== Distillation ===
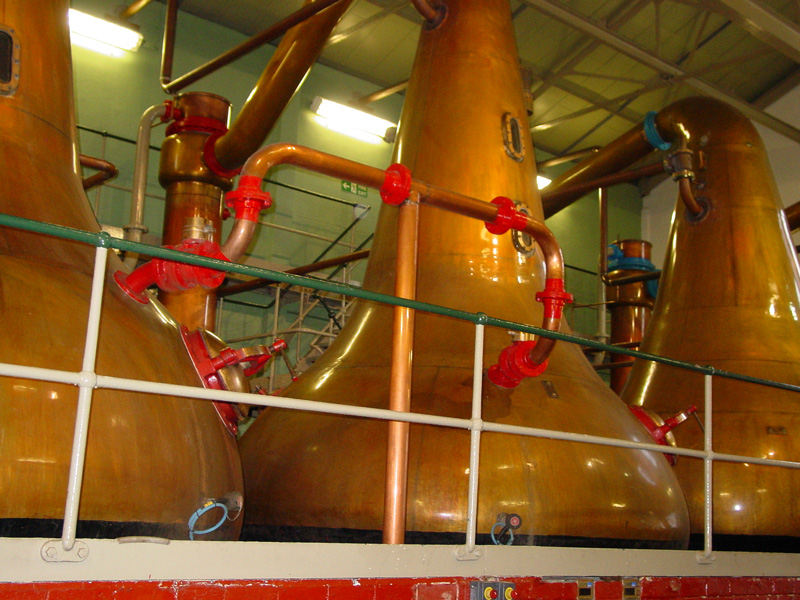
The wash, 5%–7% ethanol, is distilled in copper pot stills, boosting the alcohol content to 60%–80%.

The wash is then distilled. The wash is heated, boiling off the alcohol, which has a lower boiling point than water; the vapour is collected and cooled to condense it back into a liquid form.

Scottish regulations require single malts to be distilled in pot stills. In other jurisdictions, column stills may be used.

The initial distilled spirit produced by a pot still, known as low wine has an alcohol content of about 20 to 30%. The low wines are then pumped into a second still, known as the spirit still, and distilled a second (and sometimes a third) time. The final spirit, called "new make spirit", generally has an alcohol content of 60 to 70%.

=== Dilution prior to aging ===
Most new-make malt whisky is diluted with water to about 60% alcohol by volume (ABV) or so before it is placed in casks to mature (62.5% is specified as a maximum in U.S. law for making straight whisky). The aged spirit is then diluted with water to reduce it to bottling strength (typically 40-50% ABV). Since large amounts of water are used during the process of whisky production, water supplies are a key factor for the location of any distillery.

=== Maturation ===
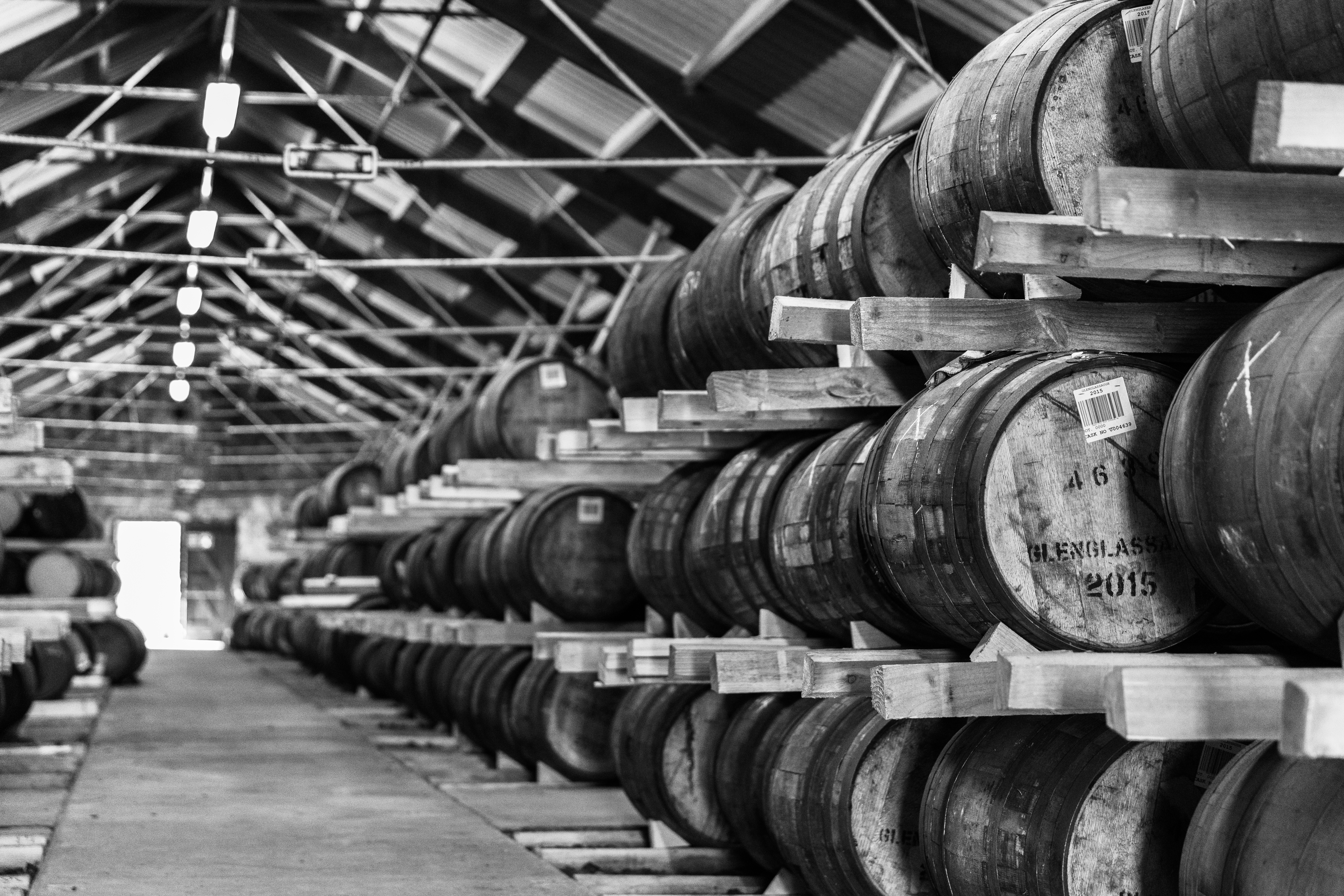
Casks maturing at Glenglassaugh Distillery

The "new-make spirit" (above 60% a.b.v.), or unaged whisky, is then placed in oak casks to mature and to reduce its alcohol content to expedition levels (40-45% a.b.v.). By law, all Scotch whisky must be aged for a minimum of three years in oak casks, though many single malts are matured for much longer. The whisky continues to develop and change as it spends time in the wood. Typical maturation periods are in the range of 10-15 years; longer periods of twenty years or more occur, but are rare and costly. During the time it spends in the wood, a significant percentage of each cask's content will evaporate. The lost part is known as the angel's share.

==== Reused casks ====
The selection of casks can affect the character of the final whisky. Outside of the United States, the most common practice is to reuse casks that previously contained American whiskey, as US law requires several types of distilled spirits to be aged in new oak casks. To ensure the continuity of supply of used oak casks, some Scottish distilling groups enter a contract with US manufacturers for casks used at least once; once a cask has passed through a first bourbon maturation in the United States, it is sent to Scotland to be refilled. Bourbon casks impart a characteristic vanilla flavour to the whisky.

Sherry casks are also commonly used. This practice arose because sherry used to be shipped to Britain from Spain in the cask rather than having been bottled, and the casks were expensive to return empty and were unwanted by the sherry cellars. In addition to imparting the flavours of their former contents, sherry casks lend maturing spirit a heavier body and a deep amber and sometimes reddish colour.

Stainless steel shipping containers, however, have reduced the supply of wooden sherry casks, to the extent that the Macallan Distillery builds casks and leases them to the sherry cellars in Spain for a time, then has them shipped back to Scotland.

Other casks used include those that formerly held port wine, madeira, rum or cognac.

=== Vatting, dilution, and bottling ===
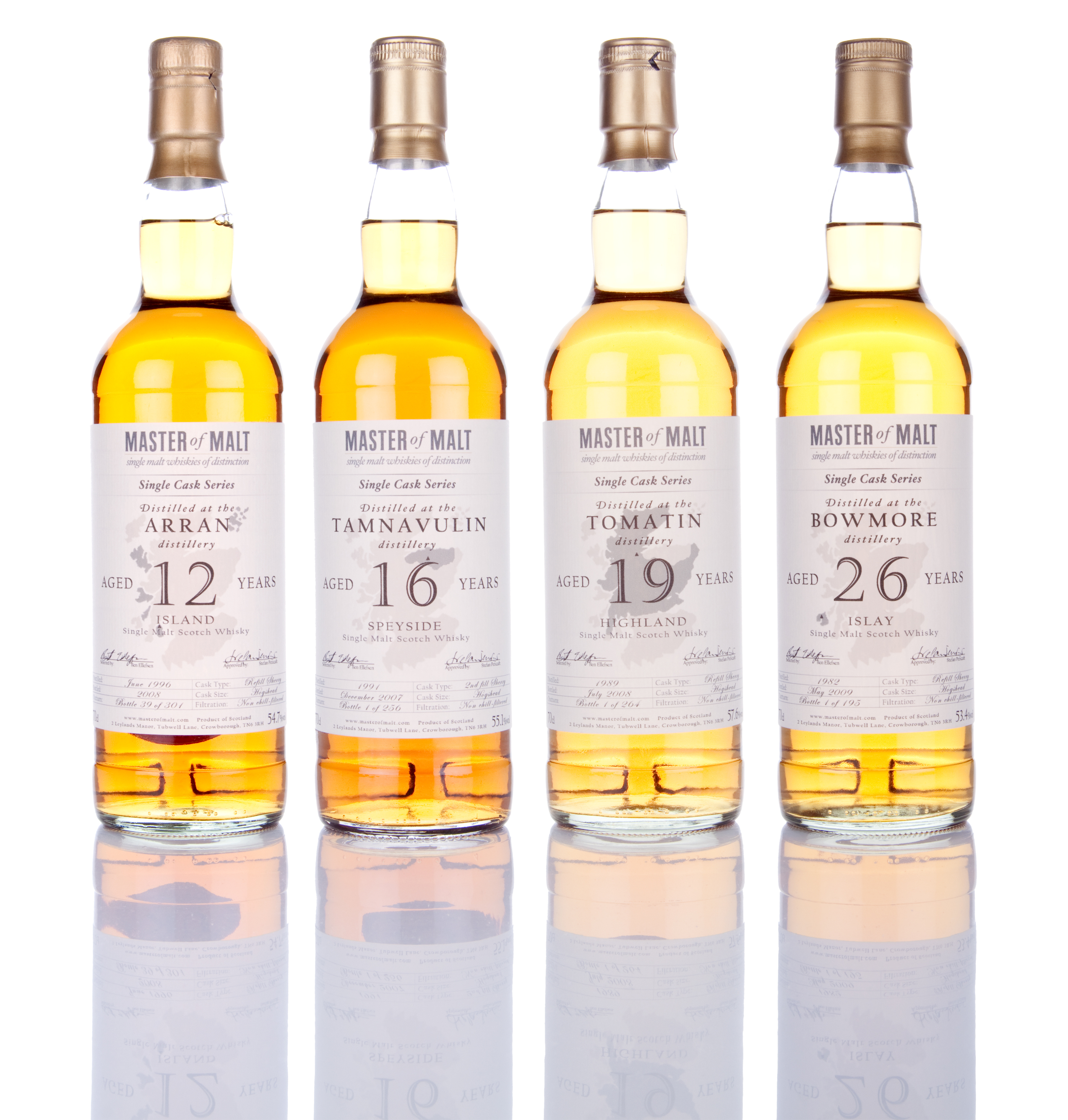
A collection of various single malt Scotch whiskies of different ages from different distilleries. These bottles were packaged by an independent bottler, a third-party company that purchases bulk whisky for resale.

To be called a single malt whisky in Scotland, a bottle may only contain whisky distilled from malted barley and produced at a single distillery, distilled entirely in pot stills. The regulations of other countries may allow malted rye.

If the bottle is the product of malt whiskies produced at more than one distillery, the whisky is called a blended malt or vatted malt, or pure malt. If a single malt is mixed with grain whisky, the result is a blended whisky. Single malts can be bottled by the distillery that produced them or by an independent bottler.

The age statement on a bottle of single malt whisky is the age of the youngest malt in the mix, as commonly the whiskies of several years are mixed in a vat to create a more consistent house style. On occasion, the product of a single cask of whisky is bottled without being vatted with other casks, and released as a "Single Cask" offering. However, it is not always clear what the term "single cask" refers to. At least some producers release vatting of multiple barrels that have been matured together for one final period in a larger single cask as "single cask" whisky.

While cask strength, or undiluted, whisky (sometimes having an alcohol content upwards of 60%) has recently become popular, the vast majority of whisky is diluted to its "bottling strength" - between 40% and 46% ABV - and bottled for sale.

=== Chill filtration ===
Whisky can be "chill filtered": chilled to precipitate out fatty acid esters and then filtered to remove them. Most whiskies are bottled this way, unless specified as unchillfiltered or non-chill filtered. Unchillfiltered whisky will often turn cloudy when stored at cool temperatures or when cool water is added to them, and this is perfectly normal. This cloudy appearance is aesthetic only and does not negatively impact the spirit.

Generally speaking, single malt whisky that is bottled at a proof ≥ 46% ABV (92 proof) does not turn cloudy when cooled (other whiskies and spirits have differing thresholds). Most retail whiskies are bottled at or near 40% ABV for economic reasons, which has now become a modern custom, and therefore chill-filtering is common.

Unchillfiltered, cask-strength whisky (usually > 60% ABV or 120 proof) is generally regarded as whisky in its purest form.

Unlike wine, whisky does not continue to mature in the bottle.

=== Additives ===
E150A caramel colouring may be added to single malt Scotch whisky prior to bottling, to give the whisky a more rich and well-aged appearance. No other additives are allowed in Scotch whisky. This contrasts with the rules governing Canadian whisky production, which allows the addition of other flavourings as well as caramel, and with the rules governing American whiskey, which do not allow additives in "straight" whisky. The use of the caramel additive must be disclosed when the whisky is sold in some jurisdictions, although not in Scotland itself.

== History ==
Distillation of whisky has been performed in Scotland and Ireland for centuries. The first written record of whisky comes from Ireland in 1405 in the Irish Annals of Clonmacnoise, where it was written that the head of a clan died after "taking a surfeit of aqua vitae" at Christmas. The production of whisky from malted barley is first mentioned in Scotland in an entry on the 1494 Exchequer Rolls: "Eight bolls of malt to Friar John Cor, by order of the King, wherewith to make 'aqua vitae'".

Single malt whisky is associated with the Scottish tradition, although there are also Irish single malts and others. Penderyn, the only whisky commercially produced in Wales, is also a single malt.

From the 15th century onwards, whisky was heavily taxed in Scotland, to the point that most of the spirit was produced illegally. However, in 1823, Parliament passed an act making commercial distillation much more profitable, while imposing punishments on landowners when unlicensed distilleries were found on their properties. George Smith was the first person to take out a licence for a distillery under the new law, founding the Glenlivet Distillery in 1824.

In the 1830s, Aeneas Coffey refined a design originally created by Robert Stein for continuous stills which produced whisky much more efficiently than the traditional pot stills. Quickly, merchants began blending the malt whisky with the grain whisky distilled in the continuous stills, making the first blended Scotch whisky. The blended whisky proved quite successful, less expensive to produce than malt with more flavour and character than grain. The combination allowed the single malt producers to expand their operations as the blended whisky was more popular on the international market.

However, during the latter part of the 20th century, single malt scotch whisky became more popular, owing thanks to individuals such as George Urquhart, second-generation owner of Gordon & MacPhail, who was described by the whisky expert George McLean as "the father of single malt", writing in 2001 that "I believe that single-malt whisky would simply not be available today were it not for the work of George Urquhart. When others knew nothing of malt whisky, he was one of the handfuls of people who understood this great Scottish contribution to the pleasures of food and drink". In recent times, single malt has made up about 26% of the whisky exported to other countries from Scotland; bulk spirits constituted about 5% and the balance has been blended whisky.

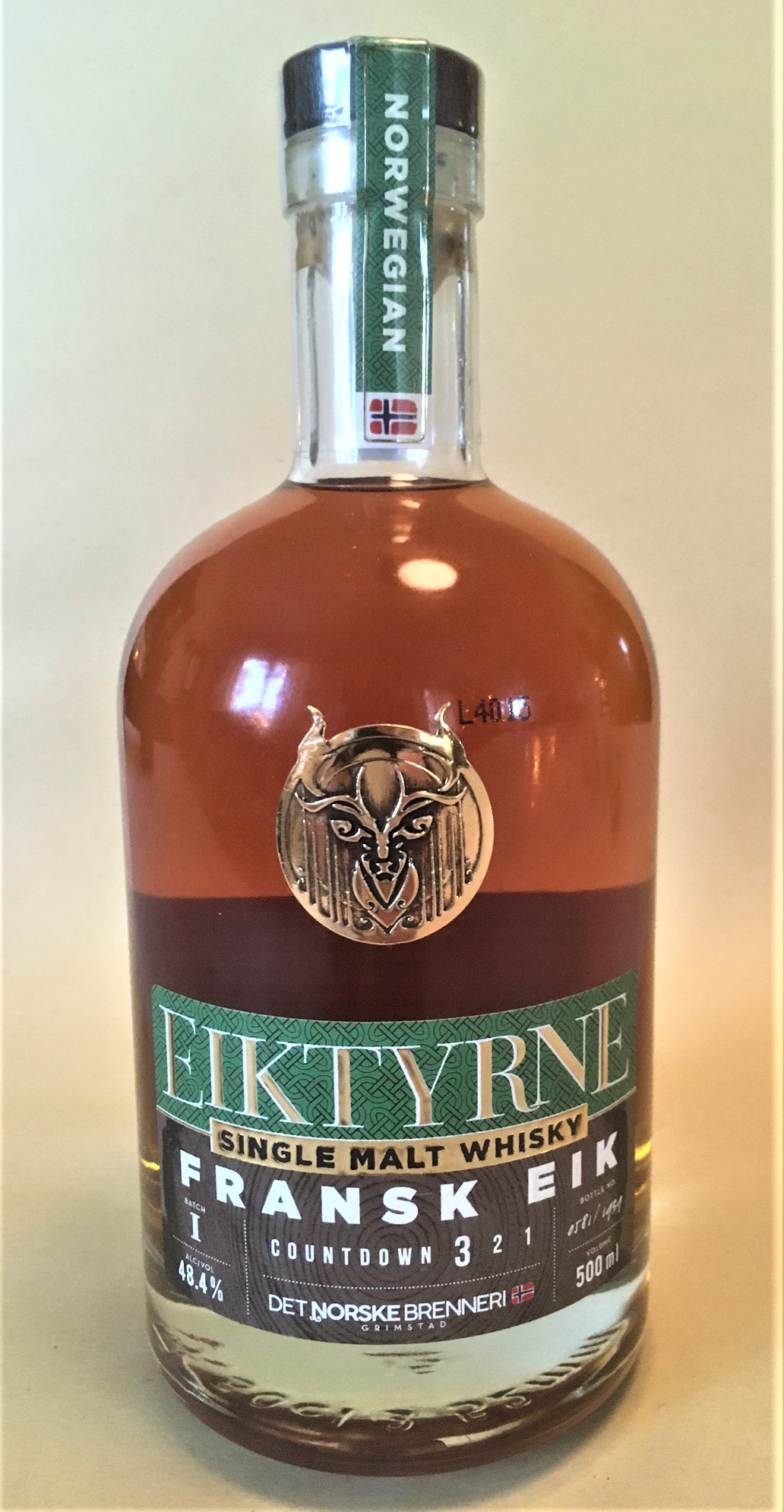
Norwegian single malt whisky

Single malt distilleries also exist in Argentina, Australia, Austria, Belgium, Brazil, Canada, Czech Republic, England, Finland, France, Germany, Iceland, India, Israel, Japan, Lebanon, Liechtenstein, Netherlands, New Zealand, Pakistan, Slovenia, South Africa, Spain, Sweden, Switzerland, Taiwan, USA, Wales and Norway.

Single malt is generally perceived to be a premium product. As of 2020 in all markets except Taiwan more blended whisky is sold than single malt whisky.

== See also ==
- Outline of whisky
- Islay single malts - Island of Islay, Scotland.
- Speyside single malt - Speyside, Scotland.
- Scotch Whisky Association
- The Scotch Malt Whisky Society.
- Bottled in bond – an American designation also featuring significant requirements.
- Irish whiskey
- Japanese whisky
- Single pot still whiskey
- English single malt
