= Rowan's Creek =

Bourbon whiskey

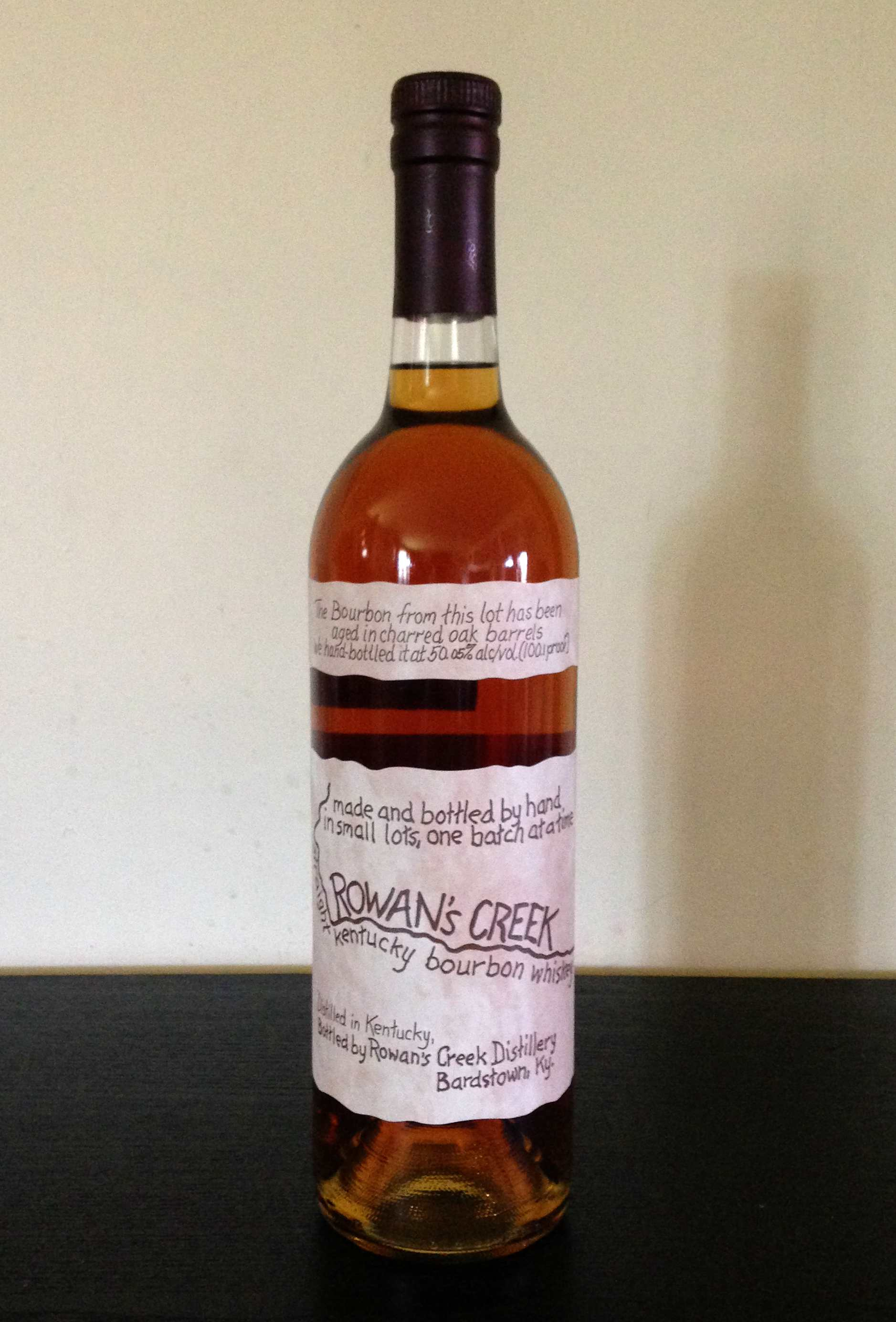
- Rowan's Creek Bourbon
- Type: Bourbon whiskey
- Manufacturer: Willett Distillery
- Origin: Kentucky, United States
- Alcohol by volume: 50.05%
- Proof (US): 100.1
- Related products: Johnny Drum, Kentucky Vintage, Noah's Mill, Willett Pot Still Reserve

Rowan's Creek is a brand of bourbon whiskey produced in Bardstown, Kentucky, by the Willett Distillery, doing business as the Rowan's Creek Distillery.

It is named for the creek which runs through the grounds of the site's distillery. The creek, in turn, is named after John Rowan, a statesman in Kentucky during the late 1700s and early 1800s, whose mansion is said to have inspired the Stephen Foster song My Old Kentucky Home. The brand is one of several small batch bourbon offerings by Willett. As of October, 2011, it was the best-selling brand produced by Willett and was available in 27 U.S. states.

Rowan's Creek is produced from barrels aged for 5–15 years and is hand-bottled at 50.05% alc./vol. (100.1 U.S. proof).

John Rowan first settled around Bardstown, Kentucky, in the late 18th century. John went on and made a name for himself as a well-respected judge and statesmen, and this bourbon is named after the creek that still bears his name. The creek is still carrying limestone-filtered spring water.

Rowan's Creek was awarded a gold medal at the San Francisco World Spirits Competitions in 2005 and 2011.
