= Conecuh Ridge Whiskey =

Brand of whiskey

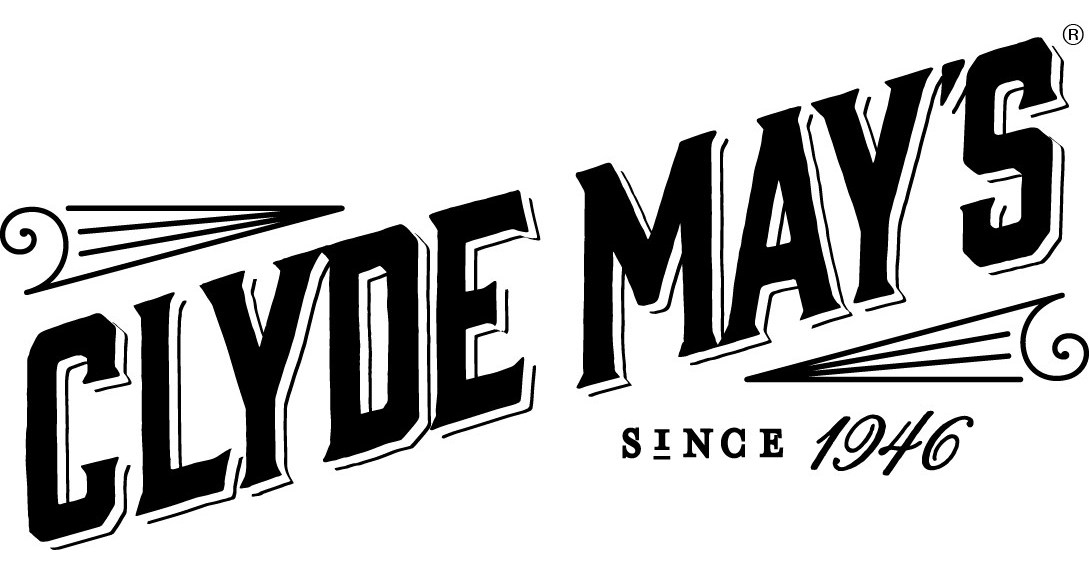

Conecuh Ridge Whiskey is an American distillery located in Alabama that was rebranded as Clyde May's Whiskey in 2017. It is a high-quality, high-proof, aged whiskey that is available as an Alabama-style whiskey, Straight Bourbon and Straight Rye whisky. Originally, it was produced illegally in Alabama during the mid-to-late 20th century by Clyde May, but the brand was legalized by Clyde's son, Kenny May, in 2001.

In 2004, it was designated the official "State Spirit" and “State Beverage” of Alabama by legislative resolution. Later the same year the brand's founder Kenny May was charged with several violations of Alabama liquor laws, to which he pleaded guilty. After a 15-month period during which the whiskey was unavailable for purchase, the brand ownership was restructured and production resumed.

== History ==
The history of Conecuh Ridge Whiskey begins with Clyde May, a legendary Alabama moonshiner and bootlegger. After returning home from World War II with a Purple Heart and a Bronze Star, Clyde May started to produce his own moonshine whiskey as a side hustle. From the 1950s to the 1980s, Clyde managed to produce around 300 gallons a week in a still of his own design in the woods near Almeria, Alabama in Bullock County, southeast of Montgomery. His product was known for its high quality relative to typical moonshine. According to his son, Kenny, the reason was his painstaking insistence on using the best equipment he could fabricate and taking extra steps during production to maintain the purity and quality of the product. While much of it was sold unaged as corn liquor, a certain amount would be casked in charred barrels with a couple of dried apples for flavor. This would be aged for about one year. Clyde claimed that the hot Alabama summers accelerated the effect of aging, requiring only one year instead of the minimum of two required for it to be called a Straight Bourbon. This would be bottled and given to friends and valued customers as "Christmas Whiskey". Always operating outside the state liquor laws, Clyde May served an 18-month sentence at Maxwell Air Force Base in 1973. He gave up his cell to the man who convicted him, Attorney General John N. Mitchell, who was convicted in 1974 on charges from the Watergate scandal.

When Clyde May died in 1990, his son, Kenny, began looking for a way to honor his father's memory by producing legal whiskey from his original recipe. Careful planning led to a production run of 4000 bottles of Conecuh Ridge in 2002. Though Conecuh Brands' offices were in Union Springs, the actual producer for its first batches was Kentucky Bourbon Distillers, Ltd. of Bardstown, Kentucky, overseen by master distiller Even Kulsveen. Under contract from Conecuh Brands they had a mash produced using Conecuh Ridge spring water trucked in from Alabama, had the product distilled, aged in oak barrels, and bottled, and returned it to Alabama for distribution.

In April 2004, both houses of the Alabama Legislature voted to override the veto of Governor Bob Riley and adopted a resolution, now known as Act of Alabama 2004-97 naming "Conecuh Ridge Alabama Fine Whiskey" the "official state spirit". For a few months it was sold in Alabama's 147 ABC State Liquor Stores and privately owned package stores in Alabama, Georgia, Tennessee and Florida. During 2004, citing distribution difficulties and limited demand for the boutique-priced liquor, the state Alcoholic Beverage Control Board stopped stocking Conecuh Ridge in its stores, but would still take special orders for customers who requested it.

In December 2004, state liquor agents charged Kenny May with misdemeanor violations in two counties. He pleaded guilty to charges of selling liquor without a license, possessing excessive quantities of liquor in a dry county, and selling alcohol to a minor. The Control Board immediately moved to revoke Conecuh Ridge's distribution licence, meaning that once stores sold out of their existing stock, the state's official spirit could no longer be sold in Alabama. May's stock was held in trust pending the outcome of his trial. Attorney Alva Lambert assumed interim leadership of the company, followed by spirits industry veteran Wesley Henderson, who led the company through turbulent times. Under Henderson's leadership, distribution was expanded to additional domestic and international markets.Wesley Henderson then went on to create Angel's Envy Bourbon in 2010.

After May entered his guilty plea, the Alabama House of Representatives moved to repeal the declaration of Conecuh Ridge as Alabama's "Official State Spirit". However, the reversal legislation never passed the Alabama Senate. It remains the "Official State Spirit" today. Kenny May died in 2016.

As of March 2009, Conecuh Ridge was purchased by Dallas, Texas-based Spirits Acquisition Corp. In 2014, the company was recapitalized by an investment group, Conecuh Ridge Distillery, Inc., led by chairman James Ammeen and is currently expanding the brand into selected markets throughout the U.S. and abroad.

In June 2017, L.C. May, the grandson of Clyde May, joined the company as their National Brand Ambassador thus helping bring the family heritage and history to the brand.

In September 2017, Clyde May's Whiskey announced their plans to build a distillery in Troy, Alabama. Troy is located about 20 miles from where Clyde May made his whiskey. Prior to 2013, distillation of Spirits in Alabama was illegal, and Clyde May's Whiskey began searching for a distillery site in early 2015.

== Character ==
Conecuh Ridge is described as an "Alabama Style Tippling Whiskey", a rather imprecise designation which basically means that it is patterned after the spirits that would have been available at informal "tippling houses". Clyde May used spring water from Southern Alabama and added oven-dried apples to his barrels. The resulting hints of green apple and cinnamon not only made it smoother than other whiskeys—they're what made it Alabama Style. It is then aged for five to six years in heavy-toast charred white oak barrels.

== Awards ==
Clyde May's Whiskey continues to win awards & accolades across the globe. In 2023 alone, the brand won 11 medals and received numerous 90+ ratings in various competitions and tastings. Some of the highlights include:

Clyde May's Straight Bourbon won Double Gold at the 2023 San Francisco Spirits Competition and scored 95 points at the New York International Spirits Competition.

Clyde May's Alabama Style Whiskey received a 93 rating from Tasting Panel Magazine and won a gold medal at the 2023 Ascot Awards.

Clyde May's Straight Rye Whiskey won Double Platinum at the 2023 Ascot Awards and a 92 rating at the New York International Spirits Competition.

Clyde May's Special Reserve 6-Year Old 110-Proof Straight Bourbon was awarded Double Gold at the 2022 San Francisco Spirits Competition.

Clyde May's 9 Year Old Cask Strength Whiskey was listed in Liquor.com's list of “10 Great New Aged Bourbons and Ryes.”

== Reviews ==
- In the 2014 book Southern Living Bourbon & Bacon: The Ultimate Guide to the South's Favorite Foods, food critic Morgan Murphy said "Conecuh uses the formula of an old Alabama moonshiner, Clyde May, and the tradition shines through."
- At the 2013 Los Angeles International Spirits Competition, the whiskey was rated at 96 points and named Best of Division (Small Batch Bourbon 10 years or less $30).
- Wine Enthusiast Magazine named Clyde May's Conecuh Ridge Whiskey among its Top 50 Spirits of 2012, and its reviewer Kara Newman said it was "A spry chameleon of a whiskey. At first, this dark amber spirit reads as light and sweet, from its distinct ripe apple and hazelnut notes to the light-bodied feel. But just when you think it's going to be a lightweight, there's surprising oomph on the finish, dry leather and clove notes that balance it out. This sippable whiskey would be great for whiskey sours and other cocktails. 93 points."
- Spirits Review by Chris Carlsson gave it a rating of 8 out of 10 (overall and for price/value) and said it was "A interesting whiskey if a bit on the light side. A good starter whiskey for people who are starting to explore brown spirits. But not something that would challenge the serious bourbon drinker."
