= Eagle Rare =

American bourban whiskey brand

Eagle Rare Bourbon Whiskey
- Type: Bourbon whiskey
- Manufacturer: Buffalo Trace Distillery
- Origin: Frankfort, Kentucky, United States
- Introduced: 1975
- Alcohol by volume: 45.00%
- Proof (US): 90

Eagle Rare is a brand of bourbon whiskey distilled and distributed by the Buffalo Trace Distillery. Eagle Rare is 90 proof bourbon, aged for either 10, 12, or 17 years, depending on the variety. It was introduced in 1975 and is distilled in Frankfort, Kentucky.

== History ==
Eagle Rare was originally a 101-proof ten-year-old (not single-barrel) Kentucky straight bourbon whiskey from Seagram created by master distiller Charles L. Beam. Introduced in 1975, Eagle Rare was among the last new bourbon brands introduced prior to the current era of 'small-batch bourbons'. Eagle Rare has been distilled, bottled and/or marketed by a number of companies, including the Old Prentice Distillery of Frankfort, KY.

The Sazerac Company, an American family-owned producer and importer based in New Orleans, Louisiana, and the parent company of five distilleries, acquired Eagle Rare from Seagram in March 1989. Sazerac's Kentucky distillery was then known as the George T. Stagg Distillery. Today the distillery is known as the Buffalo Trace Distillery.

The original 101-proof ten-year-old non-single-barrel bourbon has been discontinued as of March 2005.

== Varieties ==
Eagle Rare's standard variety is aged for ten years (in charred new oak barrels, as with all bourbons), and bottled at 90 U.S. proof.

A second variety, first offered in 2000, is aged seventeen years and is called part of an "Antique Collection". From 2000 to 2017 it was originally bottled at 90 proof, like the ten year offering. Starting with the 2018 release, it has been released at 101 proof.

In 2019, a 20-year-old limited edition expression of Eagle Rare Bourbon Whiskey named “Double Eagle Very Rare” at 101 proof was released at an MSRP of $2,000 a bottle.

A 25-year aged bourbon called “Eagle Rare 25” was also produced in extremely limited quantity. It is the oldest aged Eagle Rare product.

A 12-year aged expression was announced in 2025 as an extension to the Eagle Rare line. It will be 95 proof.

== Awards and reviews ==
Eagle Rare's 10-year variation was given an above-average score of 92 by the Beverage Testing Institute. In 2013, Eagle Rare Single Barrel Bourbon was awarded the inaugural Bourbon Trophy at the International Wine & Spirits Competition in the United Kingdom. The 17-year expression has performed similarly.

Eagle Rare 10 Year won the following notable awards in 2016:

- Gold Medal; Best Age Statement Bourbon – World Whiskies Awards (Whisky Magazine)
- Gold Medal – San Francisco World Spirits Competition

Food critic Morgan Murphy rated the brand highly, saying "Without question, the award-winner tastes as rich as it looks."
