= Kentucky Vintage =

Bourbon produced in Bardstown, Kentucky

- Type: Bourbon whiskey
- Manufacturer: Willett Distillery
- Origin: Kentucky, United States
- Alcohol by volume: 45.0%
- Proof (US): 90
- Related products: Kentucky Bourbon Distillers (KBD)

Kentucky Vintage is a bourbon produced in Bardstown, Kentucky by the Willett Distillery. The brand is one of several small batch bourbon offerings by the company – the others include Noah's Mill, Rowan's Creek and Pure Kentucky XO.

The bourbon has a relatively long aging period (substantially more than a decade – "long beyond that of any ordinary bourbon", according to the label) and is hand-bottled at 45.0% alc./vol. (90 U.S. proof).

== See also ==
- Kentucky Bourbon Distillers (the company that produces Kentucky Vintage bourbon)
