= Noah's Mill =

Bourbon produced in Bardstown, Kentucky

- Type: Bourbon whiskey
- Manufacturer: Willett Distillery
- Origin: Kentucky, United States
- Alcohol by volume: 57.15%
- Proof (US): 114.3
- Related products: Kentucky Bourbon Distillers (KBD)

Noah's Mill is a bourbon produced in Bardstown, Kentucky by the Willett Distillery. The bourbon was originally aged in charred oak barrels until mature at 15 years old, however the current bottles contain no age statement. It is bottled by hand at 57.15% ABV (114.3 proof).

The brand is one of several small batch bourbon offerings by KBD – the others include Kentucky Vintage, Pure Kentucky XO, and Rowan's Creek.

Noah's Mill was awarded a gold medal at the 2005 San Francisco World Spirits Competition.
