= Elijah Craig (bourbon) =

Brand of Bourbon

Elijah Craig bourbon
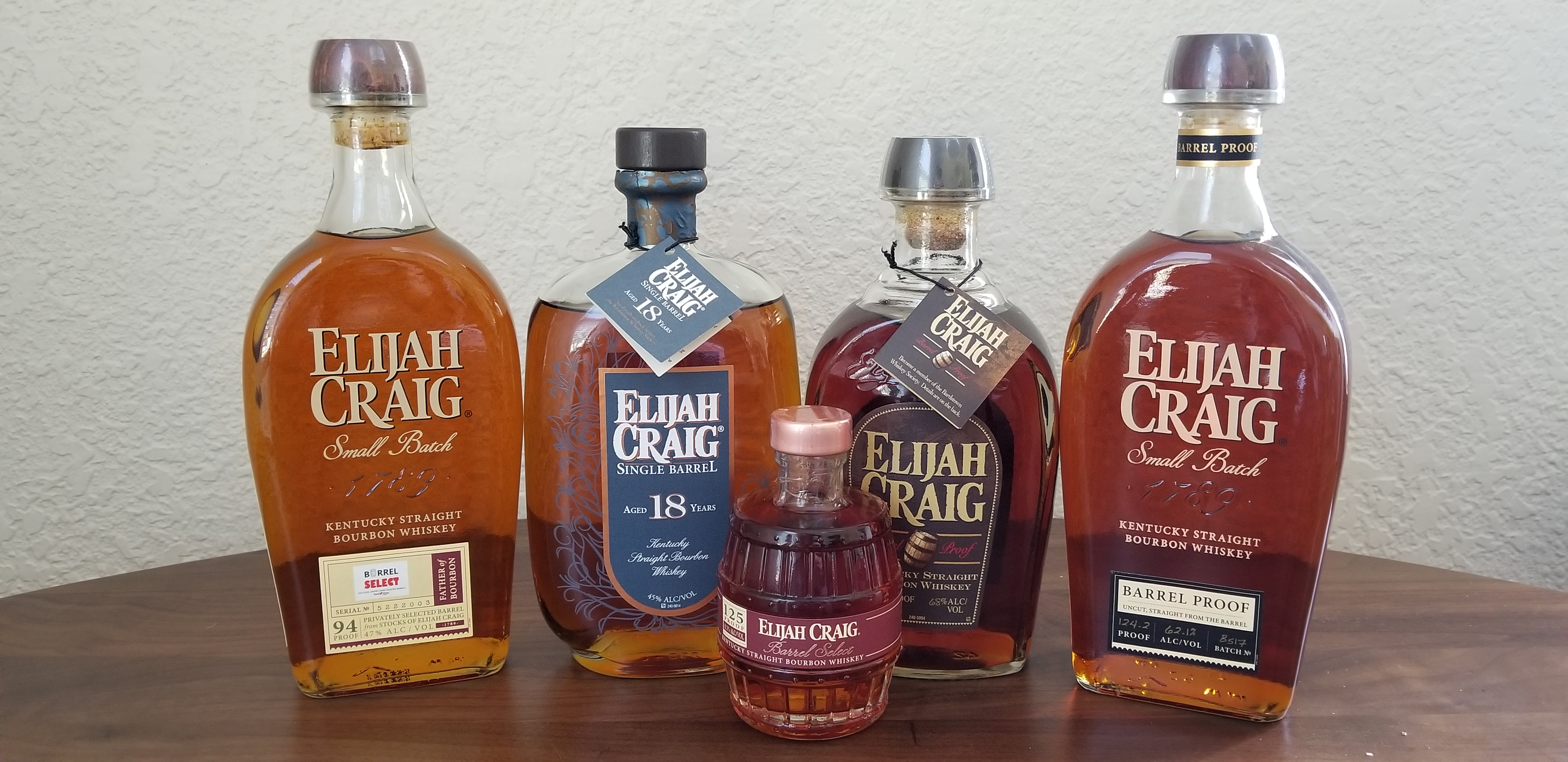
- Various bottlings of the Elijah Craig brand
- Type: Bourbon whiskey
- Manufacturer: Heaven Hill
- Origin: United States
- Introduced: 1986
- Alcohol by volume: Varies with release
- Proof (US): Varies with release
- Variants: Single Barrel Select, Small Batch, 12 Year Old Small Batch, 12 Year Barrel Proof, 18 Year Old Single Barrel, 20 Year Old Single Barrel, 21 Year Old Single Barrel, Elijah Craig 22 Year Old Single Barrel, 23 Year Old Single Barrel, 125 proof Elijah Craig (Distillery Only release)
- Website: http://elijahcraig.com

Elijah Craig is a top-shelf liquor brand of bourbon whiskey produced in Kentucky by Heaven Hill Distilleries. The brand is sold as a straight bourbon, typically in 750 millilitres (26 imp fl oz; 25 US fl oz) glass bottles.

Elijah Craig whiskey is offered in both small batch and single barrel bottlings. The small batch variation (94 U.S. proof, 47% ABV) is also available in glass 375 millilitres (13.2 imp fl oz; 12.7 US fl oz) and 1.75 litres (0.38 imp gal; 0.46 US gal) bottles. The Barrel Select expression is only available in 750 millilitres (26 imp fl oz; 25 US fl oz) bottles. The company is headquartered in Bardstown, Kentucky, and its distillery (called the Heaven Hill Bernheim distillery) is in Louisville, Kentucky.

== Namesake ==
The bourbon brand is named in honor of Reverend Elijah Craig (1738/1743 – May 18, 1808), who was a Baptist preacher, educator, and entrepreneur in Fayette County, Virginia, which became Scott County, Kentucky, following Kentucky statehood in 1792. In approximately 1789, Craig founded a distillery there. The Heaven Hill company dubiously credits him with the invention of "true Kentucky Bourbon" by improving the locally made distillate from an un-aged corn liquor through barrel-aging in charred oak casks, "a process that gives the bourbon its reddish color and unique taste." The Heaven Hill company uses this claim, calling Elijah Craig "The Father of Bourbon" in its advertising of their product. Elijah Craig is most widely known by association with this brand of bourbon.

== Variations ==
The Elijah Craig label is currently offered worldwide in four variations. A fifth expression, called Elijah Craig Barrel Select, is only available at the distillery gift shop.

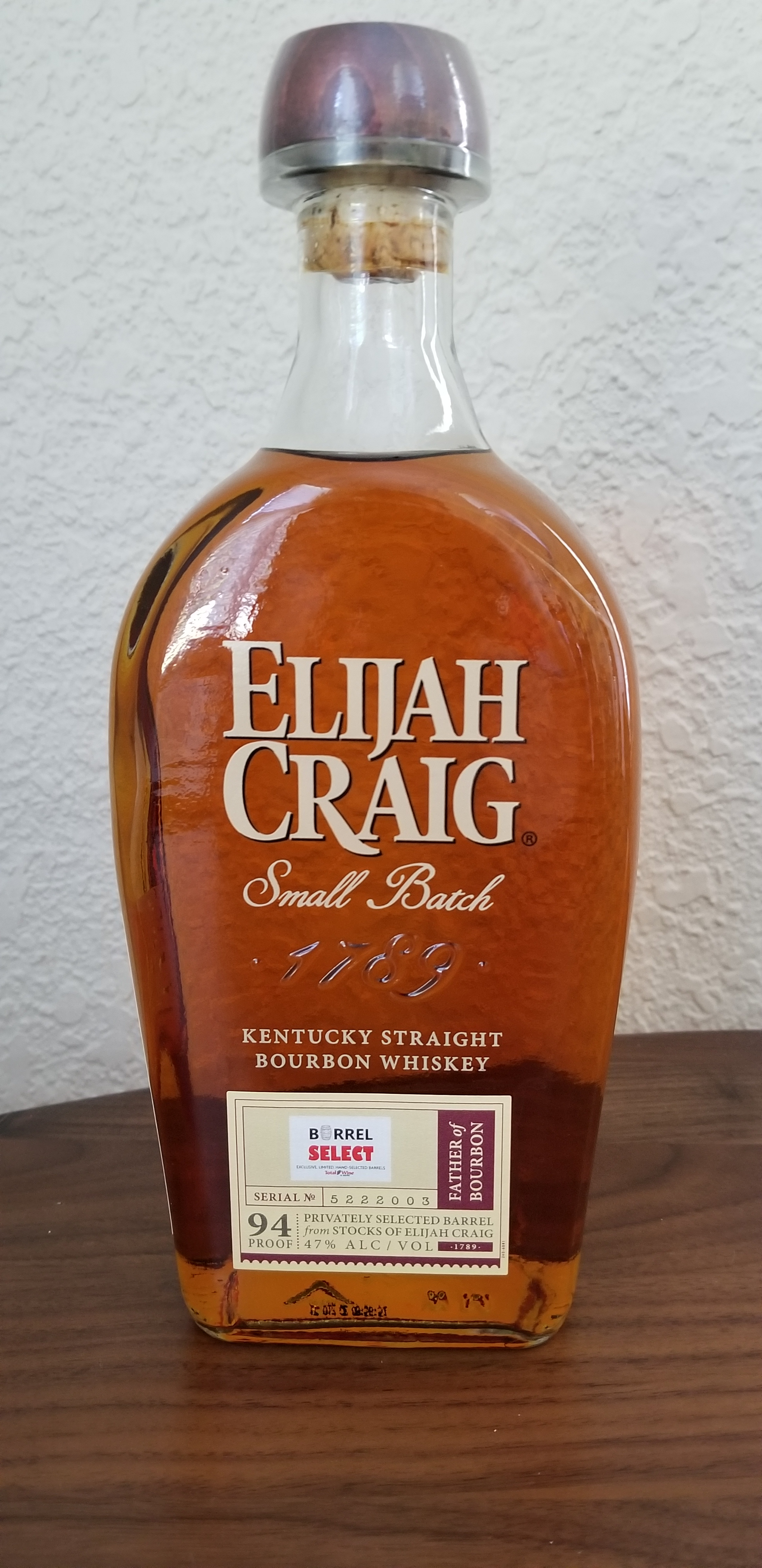
Elijah Craig Small Batch (94 proof). This particular bottling is a private selection for the liquor store chain Total Wine and More.

=== Current ===
- Elijah Craig Small Batch (94 proof)
- Elijah Craig 12 Year Old Small Batch Barrel Proof (around 125–140 proof, varies with batch)
- Elijah Craig 18 Year Old Single Barrel (90 proof)
- Elijah Craig 23 Year Old Single Barrel (90 proof)
- Elijah Craig Barrel Select (125 proof)

=== Discontinued ===
- Elijah Craig 12 Year Old Small Batch
- Elijah Craig 20 Year Old Single Barrel (90 proof)
- Elijah Craig 21 Year Old Single Barrel (90 proof)
- Elijah Craig 22 Year Old Single Barrel (90 proof)

The 18, 20, 21, 22, and 23 year old Elijah Craig variants may be sold in a hard canister with a leather bag.

== Elijah Craig Small Batch ==
The Small Batch bottling of Elijah Craig was originally released in 1986 with a 12-year age statement. In early 2016, Heaven Hill announced that it would drop the age statement from the Small Batch label and switch to a composite of 8- and 12-year-old bourbon to extend their stocks. The new labeling of Elijah Craig Small Batch debuted shortly thereafter without an age statement. The company also increased the maximum number of barrels dumped per batch for the Small Batch expression from 100 to 200 barrels.

On September 29, 2016, Heaven Hill announced a redesign of the Elijah Craig Small Batch and Small Batch Barrel Proof offerings.

The Elijah Craig Small Batch (94 proof, 47% ABV) offering is the only Elijah Craig release available for private barrel selection.

== Elijah Craig Small Batch Barrel Proof ==
Since 2013, there have been three releases of Elijah Craig Small Batch Barrel Proof annually for a total of 22 releases as of January 2020. Starting with release #13 and the redesign of the Elijah Craig Small Batch Barrel Proof and Small Batch labels, batch numbers were included on the Barrel Proof label to specify the batch release order, month, and year.

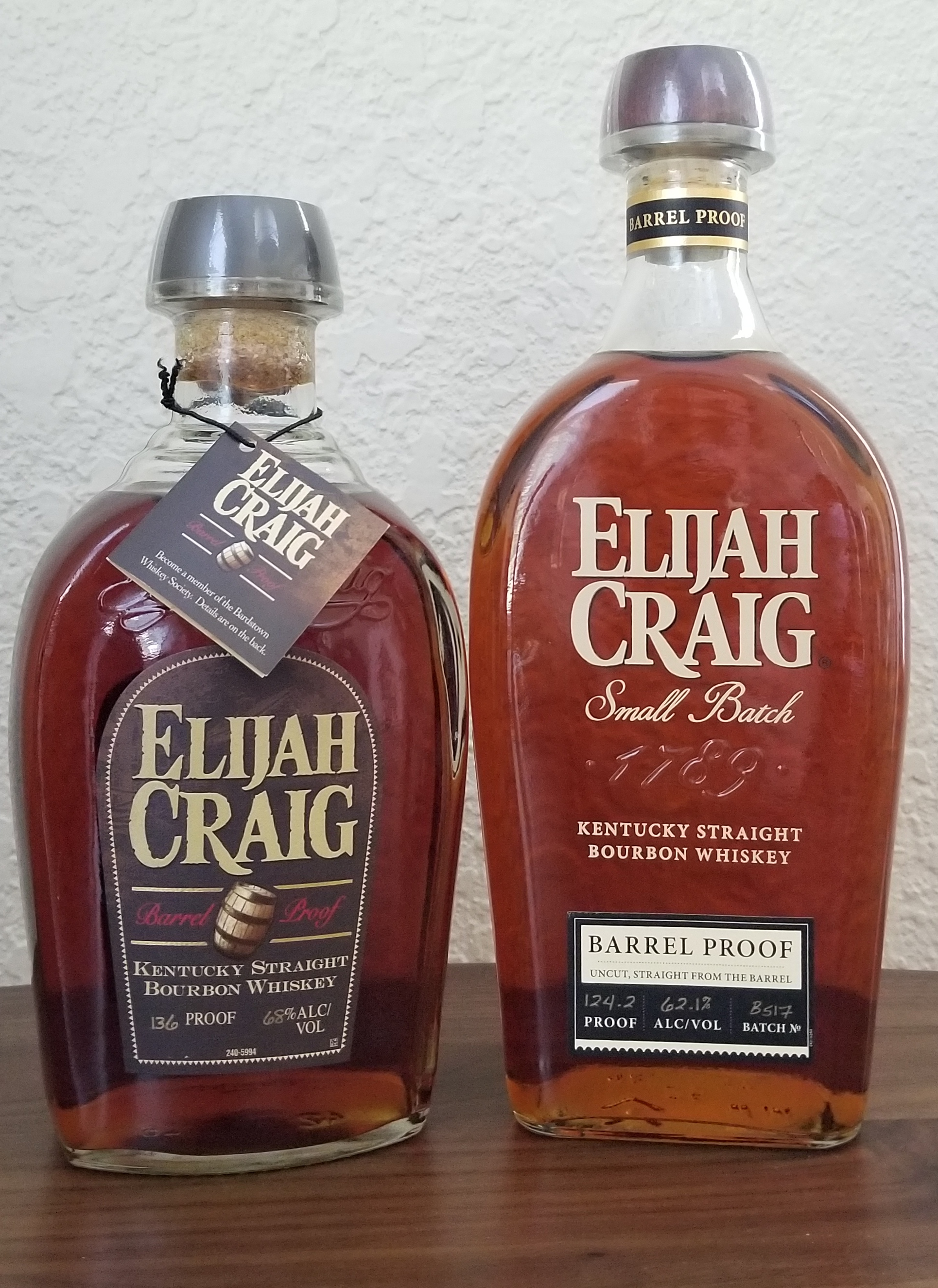
Elijah Craig Small Batch Barrel Proof releases #12 (old label, left bottle) and #14 (new label, right bottle).

Release No.	Release date	Proof	% ABV
1	Mar 2013	134.2	67.1
2	Jul 2013	137	68.5
3	Sep 2013	133.2	66.6
4	Mar 2014	132.4	66.2
5	May 2014	134.8	67.4
6	Sep 2014	140.2	70.1
7	Feb 2015	128	64
8	May 2015	139.8	69.9
9	Sep 2015	135.6	67.8
10	Jan 2016	138.8	69.4
11	May 2016	139.4	69.7
12	Sep 2016	136	68
13 (A117)	Jan 2017	127	63.5
14 (B517)	May 2017	124.2	62.1
15 (C917)	Sep 2017	131	65.5
16 (A118)	Jan 2018	130.6	65.3
17 (B518)	May 2018	133.4	66.7
18 (C917)	Sep 2018	131.4	65.7
19 (A119)	Jan 2019	135.2	67.6
20 (B519)	May 2019	122.2	61.1
21 (C919)	Sep 2019	136.8	68.4
22 (A120)	Jan 2020	136.6	68.3
23 (B520)	May 2020	127.2	63.6
24 (C920)	Sep 2020	132.8	66.4
25 (A121)	Jan 2021	123.6	61.8
26 (B521)	May 2021	118.2	59.1
27 (C921)	Sep 2021	120.2	60.1
28 (A122)	Jan 2022	120.8	60.4
29 (B522)	May 2022	121	60.5
30 (C922)	Sep 2022	124.8	62.4
31 (A123)	Jan 2023	125.6	62.8
32 (B523)	May 2023	124.2	62.1
33 (C923)	Sep 2023	133.0	66.5
34 (A124)	Jan 2024	119	59.5
35 (B524)	May 2024	130.6	65.3
36 (C924)	Sep 2024	129.0	64.5
37 (A125)	Jan 2025	118.2	59.1
38 (B525)	May 2025	126.2	63.1
39 (C925)	Sep 2025	129.0	64.5
40 (A126)	Jan 2026	120.4	60.2

== Elijah Craig Single Barrel ==
A single barrel variant of Elijah Craig is currently available in 18- and 23-year old bottlings. Heaven Hill has offered a single barrel version of Elijah Craig carrying 20, 21, and 22 year old age statements as well.

In May 2012, it was announced that the Elijah Craig 18 Year Old Single Barrel bottling would be suspended due to limited barrel stocks near this age. Heaven Hill announced that several extra-aged releases would be released annually to augment the lack of an 18-year-old offering. Shortly thereafter, 1,300 bottles of Elijah Craig 20 Year Old Single Barrel were released. In 2013, Elijah Craig 21 Year Old Single Barrel replaced the 20 year old offering. and in 2014, Elijah Craig 23 Year Old Single Barrel replaced the 21 year old. This release continues to be offered annually. In 2015, Elijah Craig 18 Year Old Single Barrel was offered again and continues to be released annually as well.

== Awards and reviews ==
In the San Francisco World Spirits Competition of 2010, the 18-year-old Elijah Craig Single Barrel Bourbon was awarded "Best Bourbon" and received a "Double Gold Medal" rating. In previous years, it had received a "Double Gold Medal" rating in 2008, a "Gold Medal" rating in 2004, and four "Silver" ratings in other years (2003, 2005, 2006, and 2007).

In 2011, Elijah Craig 20 Year Old Single Barrel (Barrel #3735) was named by Whisky Advocate magazine as "American Whiskey of the Year".

In 2017, Elijah Craig Barrel Proof B517 (release 14, 124.2 proof, 62.1% ABV) was named by Whisky Advocate as "Whisky of the Year". Reviewer Jeffery Lindenmuth described the whiskey as "delivering a massive mouthful of incredibly robust flavors that drape leathery oak over a gooey caramel core, sprinkled with baking spice, while candied nuts and tobacco leaf notes appear on a drying finish dusted with cocoa."

== See also ==
- List of whisky brands
