= Independent bottler =

It has been common practice in the whisky industry for more than a century for distilleries to sell barrels of whisky to blenders and independent bottlers as a means of making additional income. In fact, some distilleries exist solely to serve independent bottlers, and do not market any brands themselves.

Famous independent bottlers include Milroy's of Soho, who began their trade in 1964 and continue to release interesting old and rare expressions, and Signatory Vintage, three time winners of the Online Scotch Whiskey Awards Best Independent Bottler People's Choice Award.

In the United States, the first whiskey brand that was sold exclusively in glass bottles was Old Forester – introduced in the 1870s by an independent bottler. The brand was promoted with the idea that by buying whisky sold in a sealed bottle, the customer could be assured that the whisky met the quality standard of the brand and had not been adulterated.

Distilleries also pass on barrels of whisky to ensure consistency. When blending whisky, they ensure consistency by using barrels with similar flavours. If a particular flavour is notably different, it may be deemed uncharacteristic of the distillery and as such cannot be used in "official" product bottlings. Whiskies bottled by independent bottlers may or may not be labelled with the distillery of origin, but tend not to use the distillery's trademarks such as logos, fonts and images as they may not have the authorization to do so.

== Quality ==
In general, the fact that a whisky was produced by an independent bottler does not, by itself, provide any indication of quality. Independently bottled whisky ranges from "bottom shelf" products of low price and quality to the finest classes of whiskies. However, an independent bottler can sometimes provide more niche-style products due to the nature of their business model.

Independently bottled whisky is sometimes bottled at cask strength, which means it is not diluted from the strength that comes out of the barrel. This often results in a more full-flavoured whisky, because lowering the strength by dilution also dilutes the flavour. Independent Bottlers may also not chill filter the whisky, a process which involves removing fatty acids, proteins and esters to give the whisky a clearer appearance. Chill filtering can affect flavour, however, because these compounds account for a lot of the taste (the esters, for example, have a fruit-like aroma). One further measure often not taken when independently bottling whisky is the addition of spirit caramel for colouring.

Due to the long history and marketing campaigns undergone by some distilleries, their brands may be associated with a great deal of prestige. As such, proprietary bottlings can sometimes command a higher price than an independently bottled whisky from the same distillery. Because of this, independently bottled whisky is often much cheaper, which can enable connoisseurs and whisky drinkers to try "rarer", older whisky without paying quite so much. However, as distilleries often strive for consistency, and are careful not to tarnish their reputations, their branded bottlings can sometimes be more reliable.

== Secret bottlings ==
Some whiskies that are bottled by independent bottlers are marketed without identification of the source distillery. These are often referred to as "secret bottlings". The distiller may be unnamed because the distilleries that produce them only want their name associated with whisky released by themselves, or because the bottler wants to have the ability to buy from various distilleries without changing their label or revealing their trade secrets.

This type of secrecy is not always absolute. An example of a not-so-secret bottling is the "Tactical Selection" from Douglas Laing & Co's Old Malt Cask range. The bottlers have not stated the distillery, but in the style of many independent bottlings, there are clues as to its origins. In this case, the clue is a geographical location; Tactical Selection was distilled on the Isle of Skye – which at the time of its distillation was home to only one whisky distillery, Talisker.

Tactics such as these may allow bottlers to indicate their source without breaching trademark or contract agreements.

== Regulation in Scotland ==
Under the Scotch Whisky Regulations of 2009, it became unlawful for Single Malt Scotch Whisky (only Single Malts – not blends) to be exported from Scotland other than in a bottle labelled for retail sale, effective 23 November 2012. Section 7 of the Act contains the pertinent provisions:

(2) During the period until (and including) 22nd November 2012, a person must not move any Single Malt Scotch Whisky from Scotland to another country in a wooden cask or other wooden holder.

(3) On and after 23rd November 2012 a person must not move any Single Malt Scotch Whisky from Scotland to another country except in a bottle (made of any inert material) that is labelled for retail sale.

== See also ==
- Whisky
- Cask strength
- Chill filtering
- Willett Distillery – a Bardstown (Kentucky) based independent bottler of Bourbon and Rye whiskies (which has also resumed operating as an actual distillery for some of its production, as of 2012)
- Douglas Laing & Co – a Glasgow (Scotland) based independent bottler of Scotch whisky
