= Wash (distilling) =

Term used in the production of distilled beverages

Term used in the production of distilled beverages. Wash is the finished product of fermentation destined to be distilled for the first time. Distillation being the removal of impurities or purification of the spirit (alcoholic liquor), hence it is being washed. Also referred to as Low Wines (4%-20% ABV) when distilled the first time, and High Wines (20%-65% ABV) when the spirit has been distilled additional times.

== See also ==
- Single malt whisky (fermentation and distillation description)
