= Johnny Drum =

Johnny Drum (Green label)
- Type: Bourbon whiskey
- Manufacturer: Willett Distillery
- Origin: Kentucky, United States
- Alcohol by volume: 43% (for Green label)
- Proof (US): 86
- Variants: Green, Black, Black 12, and Private Stock labels
- Related products: Kentucky Bourbon Distillers (KBD)

Johnny Drum Bourbon is a Kentucky straight bourbon whiskey produced in Bardstown, Kentucky by the Willett Distillery. It is sold in glass 16 oz pint bottles, glass 750 ml bottles, glass 1-liter bottles and plastic 1.75L bottles.

Label variations include the Green, Black, Black 12, and (beige) Private Stock labels:

- Green label – aged 4 years and bottled at 40% abv (80 U.S. proof).
- Black label – aged 4–12 years and bottled at 43% abv (86 U.S. proof).
- Black 12 label – aged 12 years and bottled at 43% abv (86 U.S. proof).
- Private Stock label – No age statement (NAS) and bottled at 50.5% abv (101 U.S. proof).

== Awards and reviews ==
Johnny Drum Private Stock was awarded a "double gold medal" at the 2010 San Francisco World Spirits Competition, and the green and black labels each received a silver medal at the 2012 event. However, that was a different Private Stock than is being sold in 2016. The current Private Stock has no age statement (NAS), whereas the one that won the "double gold medal" back in 2010 had a 15-year age statement.

Food critic Morgan Murphy said "There's a rye pepper to Johnny, with vanilla-sweet overtones and a hint of cigar."

== See also ==
- Bourbon whiskey
- Straight whiskey
