= Small batch whiskey =

Product label

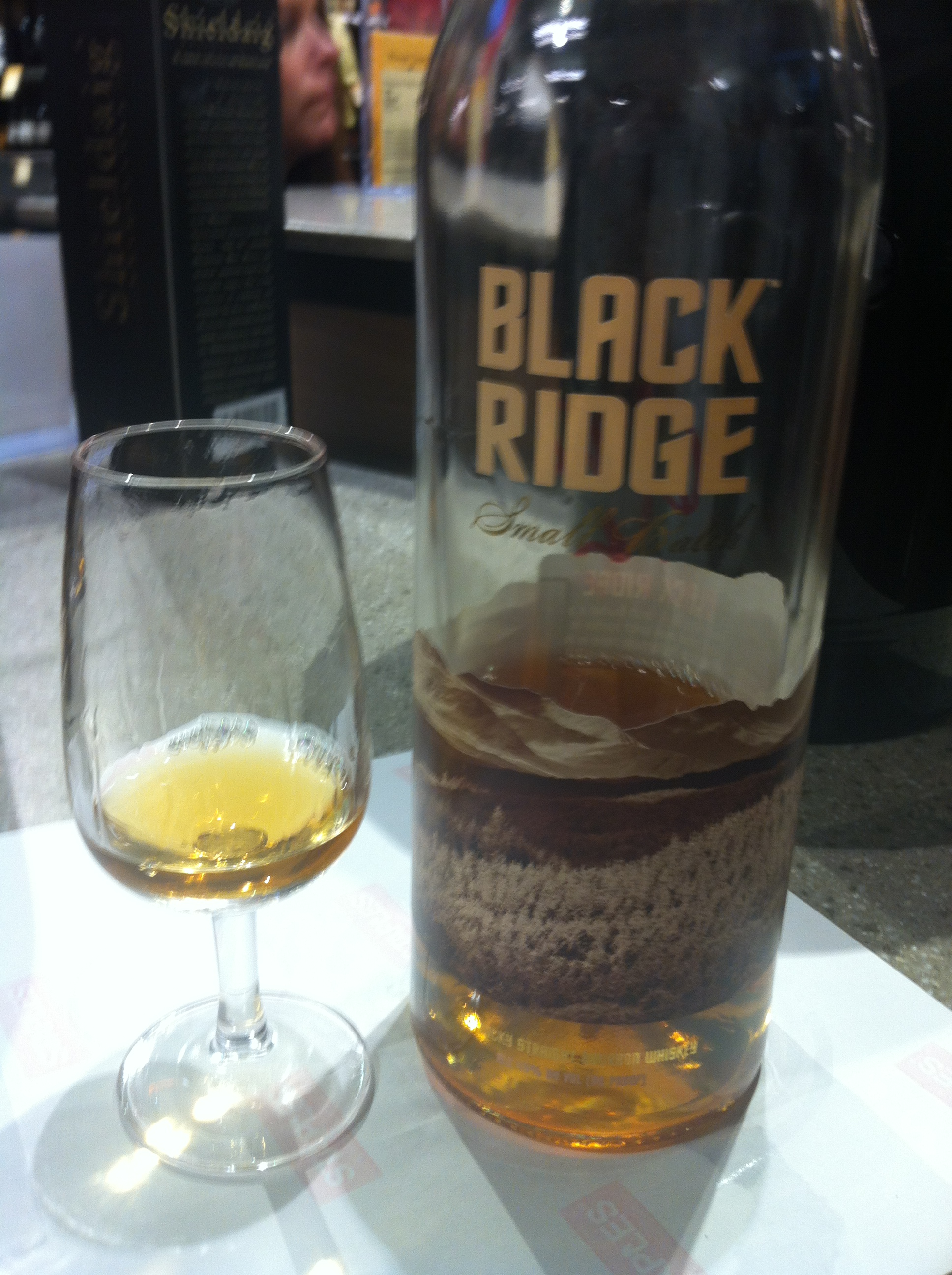
A Sazerac-produced Buffalo Trace's off-brand Black Ridge "small batch" Kentucky straight bourbon whiskey.

Small batch whiskey is whiskey produced by mixing the contents of a relatively small number of selected barrels. Small batch whiskeys are commercially positioned for the upper-premium market. The term is most commonly used for American whiskey but is sometimes used for other whiskeys as well. For example, the Bowmore distillery in Islay, Scotland, has produced a single malt Scotch whisky labeled as "small batch".

American small batch whiskeys are typically aged from six to nine years in oak barrels, but more limited series that are aged up to 23 years are also available. There are generally no clear criteria as to what defines a "small batch". For example, there are no federal regulations that define the use of the term in the United States. Many producers of whiskeys labeled as such do not provide a clear indication of what they mean by the term.

Small batch whiskey should not be confused with pot still distilling (a batch process) that is common for malt whiskey in Scotland and Ireland. The vast majority – and almost all major brands – of American whiskeys are produced from continuous column stills, also known as a Coffey still.

== Batch sizes ==
- George Dickel (Diageo) uses "approximately 10 barrels" of whiskey to make each batch of its Barrel Select Tennessee Whiskey brand.
- Willett Distillery (also known as Kentucky Bourbon Distillers), a producer of bourbon and rye whiskey, uses at most 12 barrels per batch for its small batch brands.
- Jefferson's Bourbon (Castle Brands) has a Jefferson's Reserve ("Very Small Batch") expression that gives its 750 ml bottles a number "x" out of 2,400 bottles in the batch. Assuming the angel's share and other losses amount to about 40%, this number of bottles equates to about 15 typical bourbon barrels per batch, each 53 US gallons (200 L) in size.
- Maker's Mark bourbon (Suntory Global Spirits) says the traditional definition is a whiskey produced using "approximately 1,000 gallons or less (19 barrels) from a mash bill of around 200 bushels of grain".
- Bernheim Original wheat whiskey (Heaven Hill) says that a small batch would involve "typically no more than 100" barrels.
- Elijah Craig bourbon (Heaven Hill) has a brand expression that it describes on its label as "a true 'Small Batch' Bourbon before the term even existed" that is produced with "200 barrels or less". The batch size for the brand was increased from 100 to 200 barrels in January 2016 when the brand expression's 12-year age statement was also dropped.

== Brands that bottle from small batches ==
Brands and brand expressions that are advertised as small batch bourbon whiskey include 1792 Bourbon, Basil Hayden's, Maker's Mark, and Rowan's Creek.

Brands and brand expressions that are advertised as small batch Tennessee whiskey include Dickel Barrel Select.

Brands and brand expressions advertised as small batch rye whiskey include Rebel Yell Small Batch Rye.

== See also ==
- Bottled in bond
- Single barrel whiskey
- Single malt whisky
