= Cask strength =

Undiluted whisky

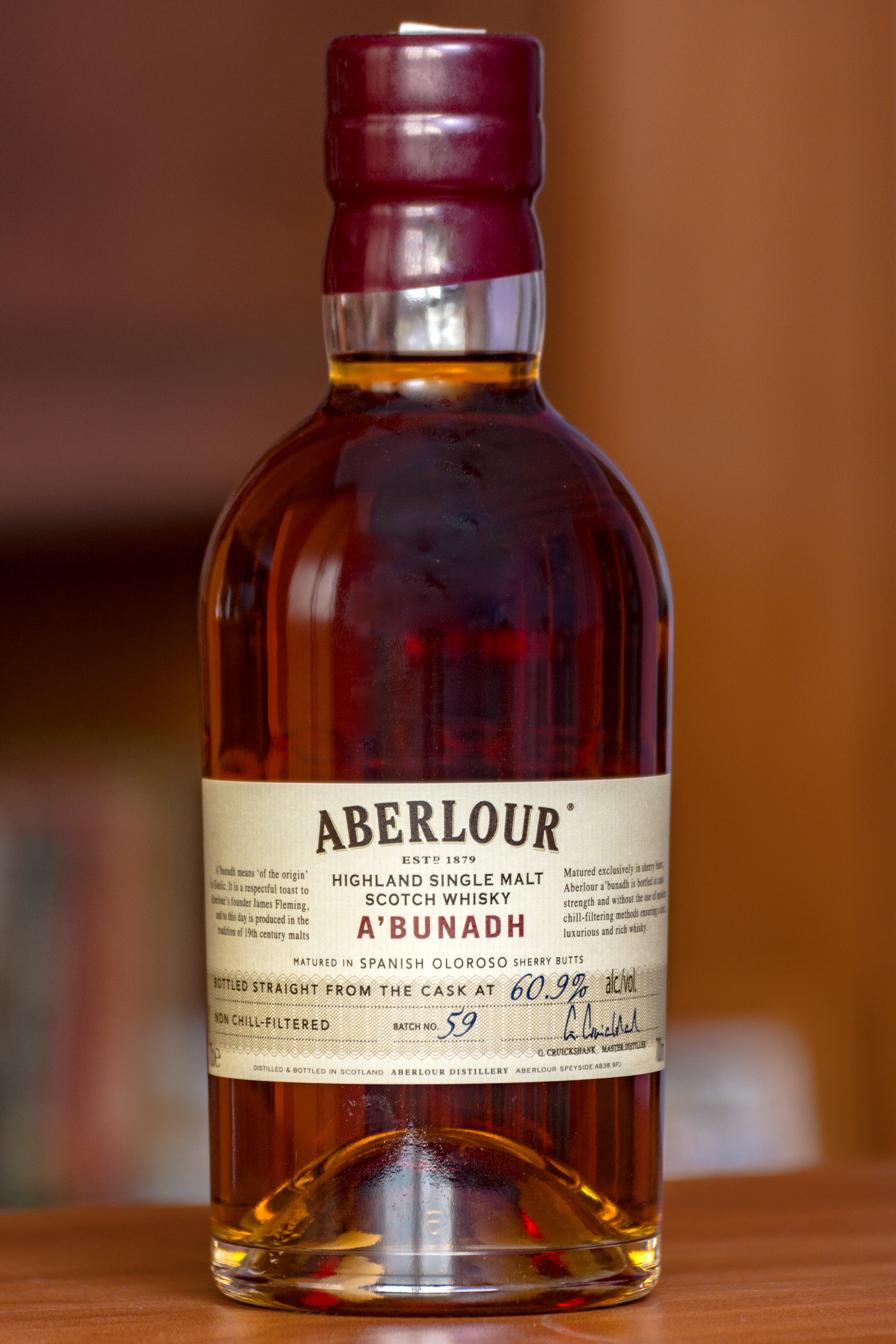
Aberlour A'bunadh Batch 59, labeled as "bottled straight from the cask"

Cask strength (also known as barrel proof/barrel strength) is a term used by whisky (spelled "whiskey" in Ireland and the United States) and rum producers to describe a whisky or rum that has not been substantially diluted after its storage in a cask for maturation. The level of alcohol-by-volume (ABV) strength for a cask strength whisky or rum is typically in the range of 52–66% ABV.

Most bottled whisky and rum is diluted with water to reduce its strength (i.e., ABV level) to a level that makes it less expensive to produce and more palatable to most consumers – usually 40% ABV, which is the legal minimum to still be classified as whisky/rum in most countries, including the United States, United Kingdom, and all EU member states (although this can be as low as 37% in Australia or as high as 43% in South Africa). The degree of dilution significantly affects the flavour and general drinking experience of the whisky or rum.

== Production ==
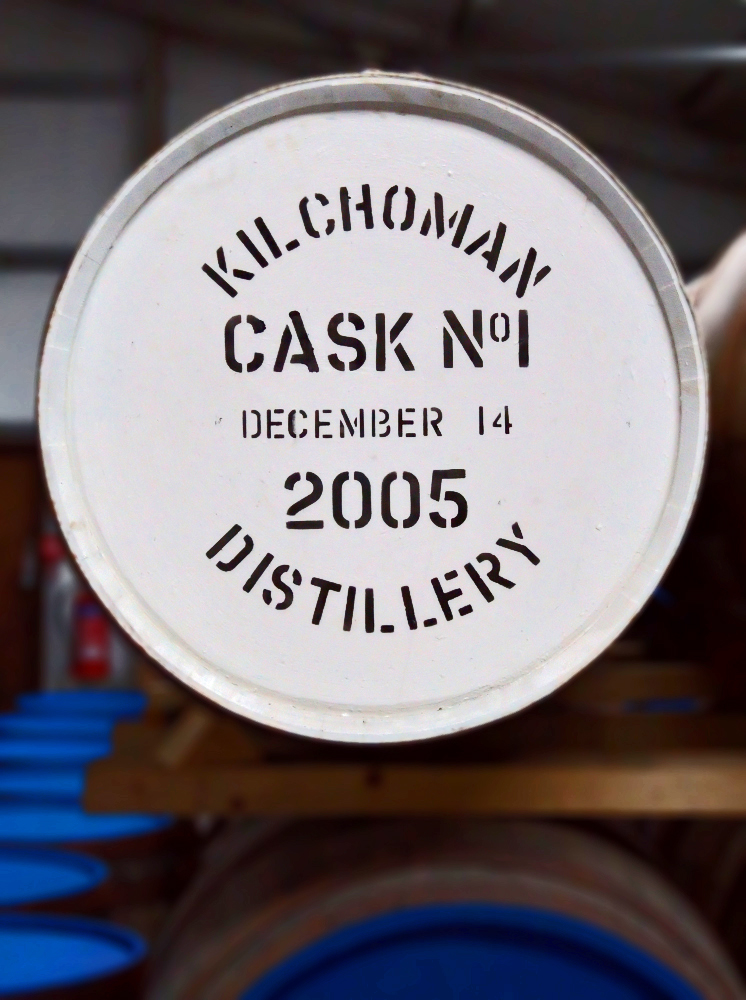
Kilchoman – an Islay Scotch whisky in the cask

Cask strength is not the highest proof for a whisky. Still-strength whisky is typically a higher proof. Whisky produced by a pot still increases in strength with each distillation and is typically distilled to about 70% ABV, and column stills are capable of producing much higher proof levels. Most distillers reduce the proof by adding water to the whisky prior to casking it.

The proof level tends to change somewhat during the aging process, depending on storage conditions. Scotch whisky is typically aged in used barrels, and due to the relatively cool climate in Scotland, the proof level typically stays the same or goes down during maturation. In contrast, American bourbon whiskey is produced using new barrels. Storage conditions in Kentucky and Tennessee, where nearly all of it is produced, allow the proof levels to rise during aging.

The vast majority of whisky bottled has been watered down to about 40–46% ABV, although some whiskies marketed for whisky enthusiasts are bottled at proof levels all the way up to cask strength.

In the United States, the use of various terms, including "barrel proof", on product labels is regulated by truth in labelling requirements. Under ruling 79-9 of the U.S. Bureau of Alcohol, Tobacco and Firearms, a whisky can only be called "barrel proof" if the bottling proof is not more than 1% ABV (2 degrees U.S. proof) lower than when the barrels were dumped at the end of the aging period. The ruling also covers the use of several other phrases describing high-proof whiskies. The phrases "original proof", "original barrel proof", and "entry proof" are restricted to "indicate that the proof of the spirits entered into the barrel and the proof of the bottled spirits are the same".

== Drinking ==
The flavour profile and "heat" – the burning sensation caused by ethanol – of a given whisky change as it is diluted, and cask strength whiskies allow consumers control over this dilution process, allowing them to add water or ice according to their tastes. Aficionados even suggest using mineral water rather than ordinary tap water, and some even distinguish among different mineral water selections.

There are bourbons that are designed to drink at cask strength using wider grain oak staves as opposed to the more expensive narrower grain staves. These bourbons do not do well when cut down with water and are designed to be drunk at cask strength.

== See also ==
- Outline of whisky

== Additional sources ==
- Directive 87/250/EEC, 15 March 1987.
