= Column still =

Apparatus used to distill liquid mixtures consisting of two columns

Legend: A. Analyzer* B. Rectifier*: 1. Wash; 2. Steam; 3. Liquid out; 4. Alcohol vapour; 5. Recycled less-volatile components; 6. Most volatile components; 7. Condenser; *Both columns are preheated by steam,

A column still, also called a continuous still, patent still or Coffey still, is a variety of still consisting of two columns. Column stills can produce rectified spirit (95% ABV).

== Description ==
A column still may be used to separate any two liquids with different boiling points, but it is described here in its most common application, separating a low-alcohol wash (also called feed liquor) into stripped water and high-purity alcohol distillate.

The first column (called the analyzer) in a column still has steam rising and wash descending through several levels, separating the wash into liquid water and alcohol vapour. The second column (called the rectifier) acts as a heat exchanger, condensing the alcohol vapour while preheating the wash. It also performs a final distillation step, with the first condensate recycled back into the analyzer with the wash.

A column still is an example of a fractional distillation, in that it yields a narrow fraction of the distillable components. This technique is frequently employed in chemical synthesis; in this case, the component of the still responsible for the separation is a fractionating column.

A column still is also called a continuous still because it can sustain a constant process of distillation. This, along with the ability to produce a higher concentration of alcohol in the final distillate, is its main advantage over a pot still, which can only work in batches. Continuous stills are charged with preheated feed liquor at some point in the column. Heat (usually in the form of steam) is supplied to the base of the column. Stripped (approximately alcohol-free) liquid is drawn off at the base, while alcoholic spirits are condensed after migrating to the top of the column.

Column stills are frequently used in the production of grain whisky and are the most commonly used type of still in the production of bourbon and other American whiskeys. Distillation by column still is the traditional method for production of Armagnac, although distillation by pot still is allowed. The use of column stills for the distillation of Cognac is forbidden, although they may be used for other types of brandy, likewise malt Scotch Whiskies must be distilled in a pot still. Distillation by column stills is permitted for Calvados AOC and Calvados Domfrontais. Calvados Pays d'Auge AOC is required to be distilled by pot still.

=== Difference between pot still and column still ===
Column stills behave like a series of single pot stills, formed in a long vertical tube. The tube is filled with either porous packing or bubble plates. The rising vapour, which is low in alcohol, starts to condense in the cooler, higher level of the column. The temperature of each successively higher stage is slightly lower than the previous stage, so the vapour in equilibrium with the liquid at each stage is progressively more enriched with alcohol. Whereas a single pot still charged with wine might yield a vapour enriched to 40–50% alcohol, a column still can achieve a vapour alcohol content of 96%; an azeotropic mixture of alcohol and water. Further enrichment is only possible by absorbing the remaining water using other means, such as hydrophilic chemicals or azeotropic distillation, or a column of 3A molecular sieves, like 3A zeolite.

== History ==
In the early 1800s, a number of different scientists, engineers, and businessmen contributed to the development of a variety of different continuous distillation apparatuses. Several of these early developers were French, spurred on by a prize offered by Napoleon to improve sugar beet development and fermentation, in an effort to reduce reliance on British imports. These early French stills were suited to the production of wine but deficient in the processing of the residual solids found in whiskey mashes. These French designs were further developed and improved upon by a number of Irish, British, and German contributors to allow for use in the distillation of whiskey and other liquids. The column still is also called la Colonne Belge, "the Belgian Column", because it was first introduced and used for commercial purposes in Flanders, Belgium in 1828. Notable contributors included:

=== Jean‐Édouard Adam ===
In 1805, Jean‐Édouard Adam developed a discontinuous fractional distillation apparatus.

=== Isaac Bérard ===
In 1806, Bérard developed a device to allow for partial condensation

=== Jean‐Baptiste Cellier‐Blumenthal ===
The work of Adam and Bérard, focused on two key principles:

1. the enrichment of a low boiling component in the rising vapour
2. the enrichment of the vapour by partial condensation and reflux into the still

In 1813, Jean‐Baptiste Cellier‐Blumenthal (1768–1840), built upon and combined these ideas, and patented the first continuously operating distillation column. This still had a pot still type-kettle, but replaced the traditional lyne arm and cooling worm with a vertical column of perforated plates. Although many of the details of Cellier-Blumenthal's column were improved upon in later years, the general concept was to provide the basis for future column still designs. In 1820, he moved to Koekelberg in Brussels, Belgium where he did the first experiments with his column still. The Belgians began distilling with his design soon after as they wanted to innovate in their distilleries.

=== Heinrich Pistorius ===
In 1817, Heinrich Pistorius, a German, patented a still for the distillation of alcohol from potato mash. The Pistorius still produced spirit with an alcohol content of about 60-80%, and was widely used across Germany until the 1870s.

=== Sir Anthony Perrier ===
Sir Anthony Perrier (1770–1845) was operator of the Spring Lane distillery (Glen distillery) in Cork, Ireland from 1806. In 1822, he patented one of Europe's first continuous whiskey stills. The still included a labyrinth of partitions, which allowed the wash to flow gradually and continuously over the heat, with increased contact between the vapour and liquid phases of the distillate. In addition, the still contained "baffles", similar to modern bubble trays. This meant small portions of fermented "wash" received the greatest amount of heat, thereby increasing the amount of potable alcohol that was collected.

=== Jean-Jacques St. Marc ===
In 1823, Jean-Jacques St. Marc, a French veterinary surgeon attached to Napoleon's personal staff, moved to England where he sought investors in his "Patent Distillery Company", which was to distill potato brandy. The company erected a distillery at Vauxhall, called the Belmont Distillery, but it proved unsuccessful. During which time, St. Marc worked on developing a continuous distillation apparatus. In 1827 he was granted a patent, and moved back to France. The still was later used successfully in England, Ireland, and the West Indies.

=== Robert Stein ===
In 1828, Scotsman, Robert Stein, patented a continuous still that fed the "wash" through a series of interconnected pots. Piston strokes were used to vapourise the wash and feed it into a horizontal cylinder which was divided into a series of compartments using cloth. The Stein still offered improved fuel efficiency compared with the traditional pot still and was the first continuous still to be employed commercially in Scotland, finding use at the Kirkliston (1828), Cameron Bridge (1830), Yoker (1845), and Glenochil (1845) distilleries. However, as the still did not allow for siphoning off of the pungent fusel oils, the spirit produced was not highly rectified, and still needed to be stopped frequently for cleaning.

=== Aeneas Coffey ===
In 1830, Irishman Aeneas Coffey patented the two-column, continuous distillation apparatus which bears his name, versions of which are now ubiquitous across the distilling industries. The still allowed for the production of alcoholic spirit with an ethanol content of greater than 90%, though modern versions can achieve about 95%.

Educated at Dublin's Trinity College, Coffey had ample opportunities to observe all manner of still designs having worked as a distillery excise tax collector for a quarter of a century.

Coffey's early designs, based on modifications to the Cellier-Blumenthal still, were unsuccessful. Being made of iron, they were attacked by the acids in the hot distillate, resulting in a poor spirit. However, his final design, which incorporated design elements from Perrier, Fournier, and Saint Marc, was to prove successful.

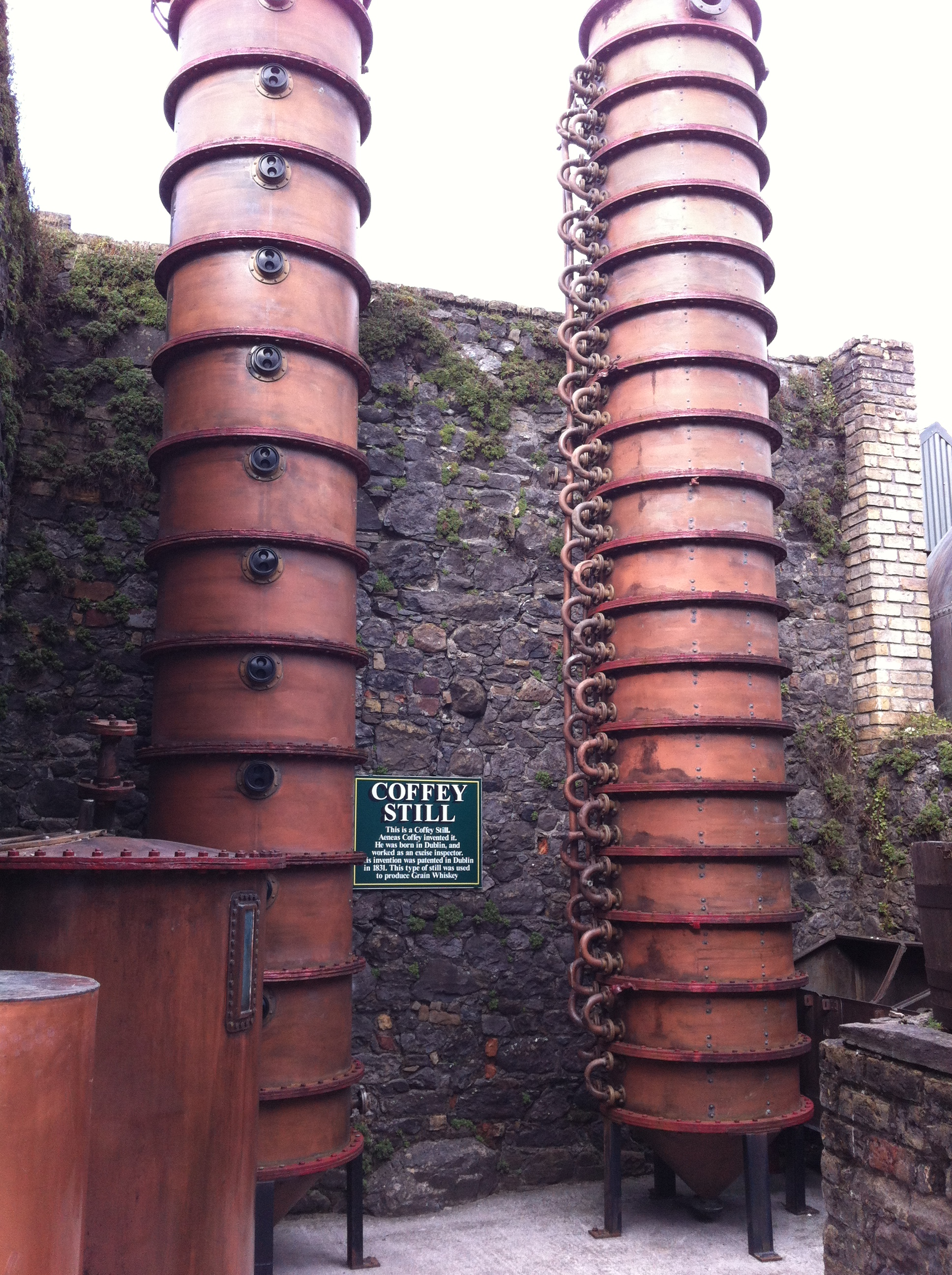
Coffey still from Kilbeggan Distillery, in County Westmeath, Ireland

In his patent application, Coffey claimed that his design made three new improvements over previous designs:

1. Forcing the wash to pass rapidly through a pipe or pipes of small diameter, during the time it is acquiring heat and before it reaches its boiling temperature.
2. Causing the wash, after it has come in contact with the vapours, to flow into a continued and uninterrupted stream over numerous metallic plates, furnished with valves
3. The method of ascertaining whether or not the wash exhausted of its alcohol by means of the apparatus herein described or any similar apparatus, whereby the vapour to be tried undergoes a process of analyzation or rectification, and is deprived of much of its aqueous part before it is submitted to trial.

In addition, the design introduced perforated trays as sieve structures for vapour liquid contact.

This new continuous distillation method produced whisky much more efficiently than the traditional pot stills, without the need for cleaning after each batch was made.

As the reciprocating steam engines of the time were unable to feed the still with the necessary high temperature/pressure steam, it took some time for the Coffey still to dominate the industry. However, with technological improvements, most notably the introduction of steam regulators in 1852, the Coffey still found widespread use in alcohol production across Europe and the Americas. Although, notably, it found resistance within Irish whiskey industry, then the dominant force in global whiskey production, who considered the high-strength spirit to be inferior in taste profile to lower strength pot still distillate.

Within five years of receiving his patent, Coffey had enough orders to warrant the establishment of Aeneas Coffey & Sons in London, a company that remains in operation today under the name John Dore & Co Limited. He closed Dock Distillery four years later and devoted all of his time to building and installing stills in distilleries owned by others.

== See also ==
- Pot still
- Batch distillation
