= Radico Khaitan =

Indian liquor company

Radico Khaitan Ltd.
- Company type: Public limited company
- Traded as: BSE: 532497; NSE: RADICO
- Industry: Alcoholic beverages
- Founded: Rampur, United Provinces, British India (1943)
- Headquarters: Rampur, Uttar Pradesh, India
- Area served: Worldwide
- Key people: Dr. Lalit Khaitan (Chairman & Managing Director); Abhishek Khaitan (Managing Director)
- Revenue: ▲US$ 19.8 million (2012); ₹169,227 (2011)
- Operating income: ▼₹ 869.6 million (2012); ₹ 9945 (2011)
- Net income: ▼US$ 636.6 million (2012); US$ 7280 (2011)
- Total assets: ▲₹ 16.6 million (2012); ₹136,742.74 (2011)
- Total equity: ▲US$ 6952 million (2012); US$ 65,140 (2011)
- Divisions: Finance; Production; Domestic Business; International Business
- Website: radicokhaitan.com

Radico Khaitan Ltd. (RKL), formerly Rampur Distillery & Chemical Company Ltd., is an Indian company that manufactures industrial alcohol, Indian Made Foreign Liquor (IMFL), country liquor and fertilizers. It is the fourth largest Indian liquor company. Radico brands are sold in more than 85 countries, including USA, Canada, South America, Africa, Europe, South East Asia, Australia, New Zealand and the Middle East.

== History ==
Radico Khaitan Ltd. was established as Rampur Distillery & Chemical Company Ltd. in 1943 at Rampur, Uttar Pradesh. The distillery in Rampur initially produced extra neutral alcohol (ENA) and supplied bulk alcohol for several liquor companies such as Shaw Wallace, Mohan Meakin and the United Breweries Group. It had a turnover of ₹ 6.5 million in 1979. It was only in 1999 that the company commenced production of its own brands. Lalit Khaitan's father, G. N. Khaitan, bought out the loss-making Rampur Distillery from Vishnu Hari Dalmia for ₹ 1.6 million in 1972. According to Lalit Khaitan, his father was a teetotaler throughout his life, and even Khaitan himself had never tasted alcohol until his father bought the distillery. G. N. Khaitan divided the family business (which included construction, real estate, liquor industries and others) among his 4 sons in 1995, and Lalit Khaitan inherited the relatively small liquor division. Prior to that the distillery was run by Lalit's cousin and others. In 1991, Radico set up a malt spirit plant with an installed capacity of 460 KL per annum; a soya oil/rapeseed extraction plant with an installed capacity of 300 tpd based on soyabean seeds & 350 tpd based on rapeseed oil cake at Ratlam, Madhya Pradesh and a biogas cogeneration and secondary treatment plant. The company also modernized the distillery unit by installing new copper distillation plant and a fully automatic bottling line. It also balanced its Single Superphosphate (SSP) plant by putting equipment like a ball mill and a scrubbing system. The entire modernisation-cum-expansion programme cost the company ₹ 365 million. The company undertook a major expansion of its solvent extraction plant to increase the capacity from 300 tpd to 600 tpd in 1994, and launched Contessa Rum, Contessa Whisky and a few other products in CMI markets in 1995. Contessa Rum is mainly sold to the Canteen Stores Department (CSD). Radico entered into a joint venture with Whyte & Mackay Group plc. in the same year, and launched Scotch whisky brands 15 YO, Findlater and WMSR in India.

While planning to launch a new brand in 1996, Khaitan and his son Abhishek, who had joined the company recently, found that more Scotch was consumed in India than was bottled in Scotland, and there was no Scotch blended whisky brand available in India in the lower price range at that time. The Khaitans intended to launch a brand to target that segment, but had low finances, which was compounded by the entry of MNCs into the Indian liquor industry. The first Radico Khaitan IMFL brand was 8 PM whisky, launched in 1999, and currently Radico's flagship brand. According to Abhishek Khaitan, the name was chosen as the company felt that "8 was the simplest thing to depict", and also because "people usually start drinking at 8 pm." in India. The TV advert for the whisky was in black-and-white, and depicted opposing soldiers bonding over 8 PM whisky at an international border. Radico announced in May 1999 that it had submitted a proposal to set up a distillery in Kyrgyzstan, which had been and it had been accepted by Kyrgyzstan government.

RKL created an international division, called Radico International, in 2003. Radico International introduced brands such as Beck's beer and wines from E&J Gallo in the Indian market. On 14 January 2003, RKL president (finance) RK Mehrotra announced that the company was planning to set up a bottling facility in Mauritius for their 8PM brand through a tie-up with a local company. In July 2003, Radico announced the installation of an ENA deluxe plant at its Rampur Distillery at a cost of ₹ 200 million. The company would use some of the ENA for its own IMFL brands, while the rest is sold in India and exported to liquor majors in Europe and the Commonwealth of Independent States (CIS) . Radico purchased Bacardi's 51% stake in Whytehall India for over ₹ 300 million in 2004, gaining control of the Whytehall brand. In a press release on 7 April 2004, Radico announced that it had acquired Anab-e-Shahi, a bottling plant in Andhra Pradesh. This was the company's first acquisition in South India.

Radico entered the vodka market in November 2005, with the launch of the grain-based Magic Moments vodka. Although Magic Moments was not an instant success like 8 PM, it earns Radico more revenue than 8 PM. In 2005, the company set up a grain-based distillery plant in Uttar Pradesh at a cost of ₹ 850 million.

In May 2006, Radico announced that it had entered into two overseas joint ventures in the United Kingdom and western Africa, becoming the first Indian liquor company to have overseas production lines. The joint ventures are intended to help Radico launch its brands in the UK and African markets. Radico handles sales, marketing and distribution functions, while manufacturing is outsourced to the local partner. The whiskies Radico sells outside India are grain-based, while its whiskies in India are made from molasses. In August 2006, Diageo and Radico Khaitan announced a 50:50 JV called Diaego Radico Distilleries Pvt Ltd in the Indian spirits market, with the latter handling distribution and manufacturing base and former providing marketing. The move marked Diageo's return to the IMFL market, which it had previously exited in 2001. Diageo Radico launched Masterstroke Deluxe Whisky in the premium segment in March 2007. However, the joint venture did not launch any new brands following that. Diageo instead developed its own marketing and distribution machinery to strengthen its presence in India. In 2011, Diageo announced its intention to buy half of Radico's stake in the JV. In October 2007, Radico entered into a tripartite joint venture with NV Distillers and Ridhi Sidhi Pvt Ltd to set up a greenfield distillery in Aurangabad, Maharashtra with a combined investment of ₹ 1.60 billion. Radico would have a 36% stake in Radico NV Distilleries Maharashtra Ltd, which would manufacture ENA, IMFL and ethanol, and also have a bottling facility. The distillery is Radico's second, after the Rampur Distillery

Morpheus brandy was launched in May 2009. Its largest markets are Tamil Nadu, Andhra Pradesh, Kerala and Karnataka. The company named the brandy after Morpheus, the Greek god of dreams, in order to "convey a sense of softness with a European touch". Radico launched Carlo Rossi wine in Mumbai in April 2009, through its joint venture with E&J Gallo, which owns the brand. Radico had already been selling other E&J Gallo brands such as André, Wine Cellars, Sonoma County and Turning Leaf in India.

Radico announced on 7 April 2011 that it had entered into an agreement with Japanese firm Suntory Liquors Ltd to market and distribute the latter's Yamazaki single malt and Hibiki blended whiskies in India. Radico launched After Dark, a 100% grain-based whisky manufactured at its Rampur distillery, in September 2011.

== PET Division ==
Radico Khaitan's PET division, started in 2003, produces a wide range of PET bottles and jars for the pharmaceutical, cosmetics, home & personal care, edible oil and confectionery industries. It utilizes single stage machines of Nissei ASB Machine Co. Ltd., Japan to meet in-house needs, but eventually began supplying PET bottles even to competitors. The PET division operates as an independent profit group. The company has a 750 ml kidney shape PET bottle manufacturing plant in Uttarakhand. The unit started with a production rate of 08.5 million bottles annually in October 2004, and currently produces 600 million PET bottles that cater to Radico's own captive consumption of 300 million bottles annually, while the sold to outside clients in liquor, pharmaceuticals and FMCG. Companies it supplies include Keo Karpin Hair Oil, BL Agro Ltd., Khandelwal Oils Ltd, Perfetti, Amrut Distilleries, Allied Blenders & Bottlers Ltd, Jagatjit Industries, John Distilleries, Khoday’s, Mohan Meakin and NICOL.

== IMFL brands ==
Radico Khaitan manufactures whisky, rum, brandy, vodka and gin.

Whisky

- RAMPUR Indian Single Malt
- 8PM
- 8PM Honey
- 8PM Fire
- Radico-Gold-Whisky
- Crown whisky
- After Dark
- Royal Whytehall
- Royal Ranthambore
- Whytehall Honey Whisky

Rum

- 8 PM Bermuda
- Contessa Dark Rum
- Contessa White Rum
- Contessa Cola Rum
- Contessa Double Chocolate Rum
- Contessa Coffee Rum
- Black Cat Rum
- Afri Bull Cafe Rum
- Afri Bull Power Rum

Vodka

- Magic Moments Vodka
- Magic Moments Remix Vodka
- Magic Moments verve vodka
- Magic moments verve Flavored Vodka

Brandy

- 8 PM Excellency Brandy
- Morpheus
- Morpheus Blue
- Old Admiral
- Florence

Gin

- JAISALMER Indian Craft Gin

== Distilleries and units ==
=== Rampur Distillery ===
Rampur Distillery, located in Rampur, Uttar Pradesh, is Radico Khaitan's first and largest distillery, with a production capacity of 125 million litres per annum. It manufactures high grade ENA from molasses and grain with a production capacity of 75 Million litres of molasses ENA, 30 million litres of grain neutral spirit and 460 thousands litres of malt whisky annually. Rampur Distillery also manufactures country liquor and IMFL, of which some IMFL meets the domestic requirement and the rest is exported.

The unit is self-sufficient in meeting its fuel and power requirements by utilizing its effluent for generating the biogas which, in turn, is utilized for generating the steam and power for its captive requirement. The distillery complies with the zero discharge concept set up by the Central Pollution Control Board (CPCB). Primary treatment of the effluent yields biogas, which is used as fuel in a Cogen boiler to generate steam and then power through a backpressure turbine. The backpressure steam is used again in the distillation plant to produce ENA and rectified spirit. The treated effluent is not discharged outside, in keeping with pollution control norms, and is in turn mixed and cured with organic mass like press mud of sugar mills and suitable organic manures to manufacture bio manure or bio compost, a bio fertilizer used in growing crops like sugar cane.

The cogeneration plant of the Rampur Distillery consists of 26 MT capacity of a stand-alone, biogas fired steam boiler, a 2 MW turbine generator, a 30 MT capacity biogas and rice husk based boiler, and 2.5 MW in tandem to make the unit self-reliant in meeting power requirements for normal operation.

=== Company owned units ===
Radico Khaitan owns 5 units in India. Their locations are listed below:

- Rampur Distillery (Rampur, Uttar Pradesh)
- Thimmapur, Telangana
- Aurangabad, Maharashtra
- Reengus, Rajasthan
- Bajpur, Uttarakhand
- Sitapur, Uttar Pradesh

=== Associate units ===
Radico Khaitan has affiliations with several bottling units across India. They are listed below, with their locations in brackets.

North

- NV Distilleries Ltd. (Haryana)
- Himalayan Gold Beverages (P) Ltd. (Himachal Pradesh)
- Oakland Bottlers Pvt. Ltd. (Jammu and Kashmir)
- New India Distillers (Jammu and Kashmir)
- Rajasthan Liquors (P) Ltd. (Punjab)
- NV Distilleries & Breweries Pvt. Ltd. (Punjab)

East

- United Brothers Distilleries Pvt. Ltd. (Arunachal Pradesh)
- Seven Sister Trade & Distilleries Pvt. Limited (Assam)
- Goodhost Liquors Pvt. Ltd. (Bihar)
- Gemini Distilleries Pvt. Ltd. (Jharkhand)
- Bacchus Bottling Pvt. Ltd. (Odisha)
- Diamond Bottling Plant company (West Bengal)

South

- KALS Distilleries Carnataka pvt.ltd(Karnataka)
- Kamal Wineries (Andhra Pradesh)
- Gowthami Agro Industries Pvt. Ltd (Andhra Pradesh)
- GSB & Company (Andhra Pradesh)
- Sri Venkateshwara Distilleries (Karnataka)
- Nethravathi Distilleries Pvt. Ltd. (Karnataka)
- Polsons Distillery (Kerala)
- United Distilleries (Kerala)
- Ravikumar Distilleries Limited (Pondicherry)
- Southern Agrifurane Industries Ltd. (Tamil Nadu)
- SNJ Distillers Private Limited (Tamil Nadu)
- Midas Golden Distilleries (Pvt) Ltd (Tamil Nadu)
- Empee Distilleries Ltd. (Tamil Nadu)

West

- Bhatia Wines Merchants Pvt Ltd (Chhattisgarh)
- Welcome Distilleries Pvt. Ltd. (Chhattisgarh)
- Gwalior Distillers Ltd. (Madhya Pradesh)
- Radico NV Distilleries Maharashtra Ltd. (Maharashtra)
