= Rock Hill Farms =

Whiskey produced in Frankfort, Kentucky

Rock Hill Farms Single-Barrel
- Type: Bourbon whiskey
- Manufacturer: The Sazerac Company
- Origin: Kentucky, United States
- Alcohol by volume: 50.00%
- Proof (US): 100.0
- Related products: Buffalo Trace

Rock Hill Farms is a single barrel bourbon whiskey produced in Frankfort, Kentucky, by the Sazerac Company. The brand is sold as a straight bourbon. It comes from Buffalo Trace Distillery's mash bill #2. Similar Buffalo Trace Distillery bourbons that come from mash bill #2 are Elmer T. Lee, Ancient Age, and Blanton's. Rock Hill Farms is sold in glass in 750ml bottles.
