= Stephen Goldring =

American businessman (1908–1996)

- Born: William A. Goldring; 1908; Pensacola, Florida, United States
- Died: 1996 (aged 87–88)
- Title: Chairman, Sazerac Company
- Spouse: Mathilde "Teal" Goldring
- Children: William Goldring

Stephen Goldring (1908 – 1996) was an American businessman, chairman of the Sazerac Company, and head of the family that owns Sazerac.

== Personal life ==
Stephen Goldring was born in Pensacola, Florida, the son of Newman Goldring, who started in the alcoholic drinks industry in 1898. The family moved to Chicago during Prohibition, but later returned to Florida.

== Career ==
In 1944, Goldring founded the Magnolia Marketing Company with Malcolm Woldenberg, his long-time business partner.

== Personal life ==
Goldring was Jewish. He was married to Mathilde "Teal" Goldring. Their son William Goldring is chairman of Sazerac.

In 1957, Stephen and Mathilde Goldring created the Goldring Family Foundation. After Woldenberg's death, he also oversaw the Woldenberg Foundation. He concentrated on health, welfare, education, and the arts, and supported Tulane University, University of New Orleans, Jewish Federation of New Orleans, the Anti-Defamation League, Temple Sinai, Henry S. Jacobs Camp, Touro Infirmary, the Audubon Institute, and the United Way.

Goldring died in 1996.
