= BuzzBallz =

Brand of pre-mixed cocktail drinks

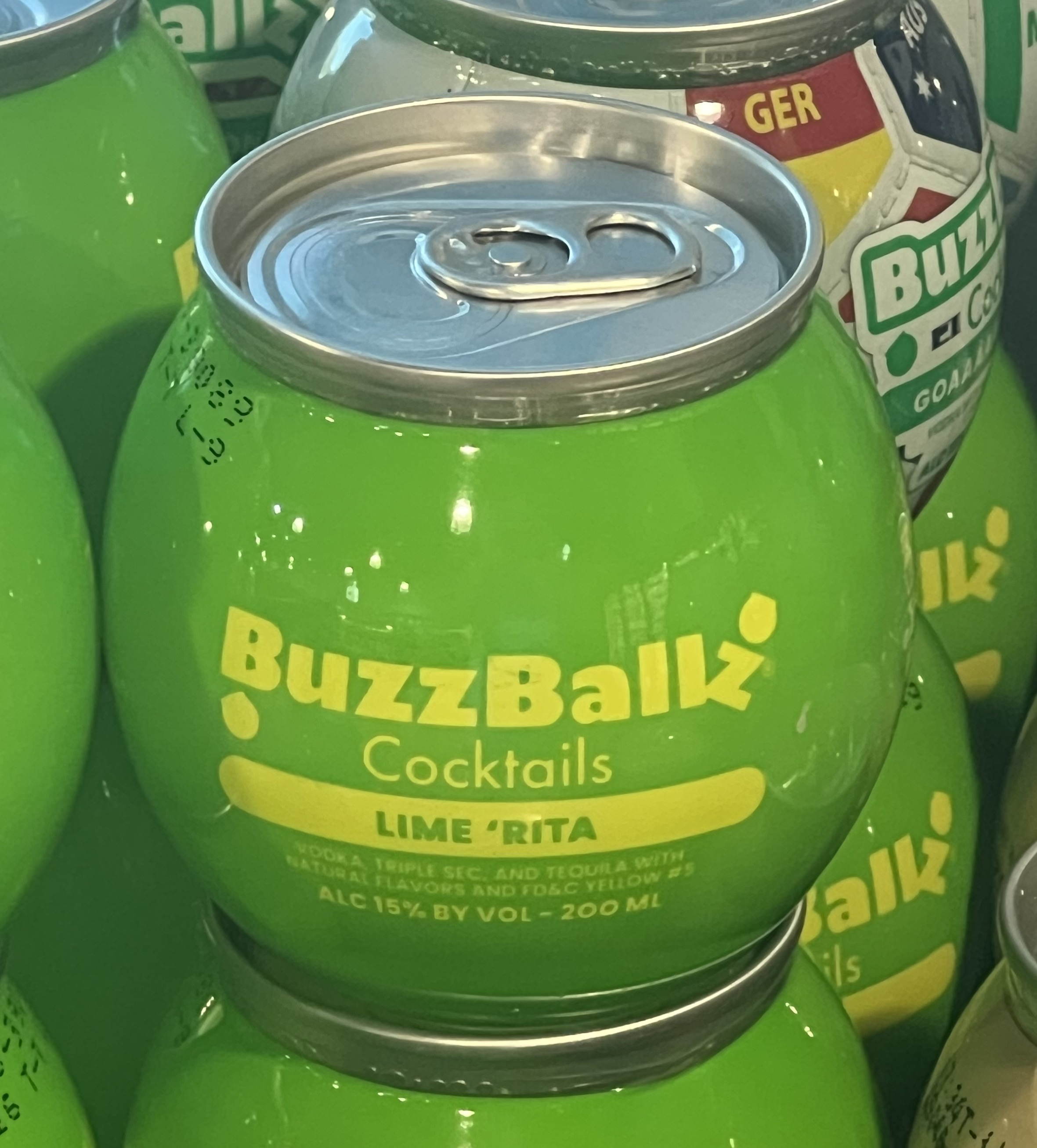
- A can of BuzzBallz Lime 'Rita cocktail.
- Type: Cocktail
- Manufacturer: Sazerac Company
- Origin: Dallas
- Introduced: 2009
- Alcohol by volume: 13.5%
- Website: buzzballz.com

BuzzBallz is a range of US-owned ready-to-drink cocktail mix manufactured by Sazerac Company, Inc. Originally devised as a master's degree project, it was incorporated as BuzzBallz, LLC and promoted as being a woman-owned and family-run business. It was acquired by Sazerac in 2024. The company manufactures a wide range of beverages sold domestically and internationally. It is a distillery, winery, and brewery in Dallas.

== History ==
Originally created as a college project by Merrilee Kick in Dallas while working on a high school teaching degree, the company launched in 2009 and expanded as a family-owned enterprise with assistance from her sons. The concept for the drink originated from the shape of a votive candle holder.

In a 2016 interview with Forbes, Kick discussed her difficulties raising money for her business. It was acquired by Sazerac Company, Inc. in 2024 for approximately $500 million.

Sazerac is a US-owned private company owned by chairman William Goldring with an estimated net worth of $3.9 billion.

They have gained popularity among Generation Z as an affordable alcoholic beverage, with an alcohol by volume (ABV) of 13.5–20% and a volume of 200 ml (6.8 US fl oz). Priced typically under $5 per unit, BuzzBallz are available in over 30 flavor varieties. A notable product line is the BuzzBallz Biggies, large-format spherical containers of 1.5–1.75 L (3.2–3.7 US pt), priced generally under $30. Each Biggie contains the equivalent of seven to nine standard BuzzBallz servings. A larger line of products, the BuzzBallz Boulders, was released on July 8 2026, containing 3 L (6.3 US pt) per container.

== Reception ==
The company's drink range has received mixed reviews, which are generally neutral to negative regarding taste. Marcie Seidel of the Drug Free Action Alliance, a substance abuse prevention group based in Gambier, Ohio, said that the 20% alcohol content (40 proof) of the cocktails is "really scary" and the packaging, which targets young people, is concerning for the alliance. The drink also attracts controversy from various substance abuse prevention groups for its promotion of drinking around water activities, marketing focus towards Gen Z, bright colors, bright labels, and designs which are attractive to children.

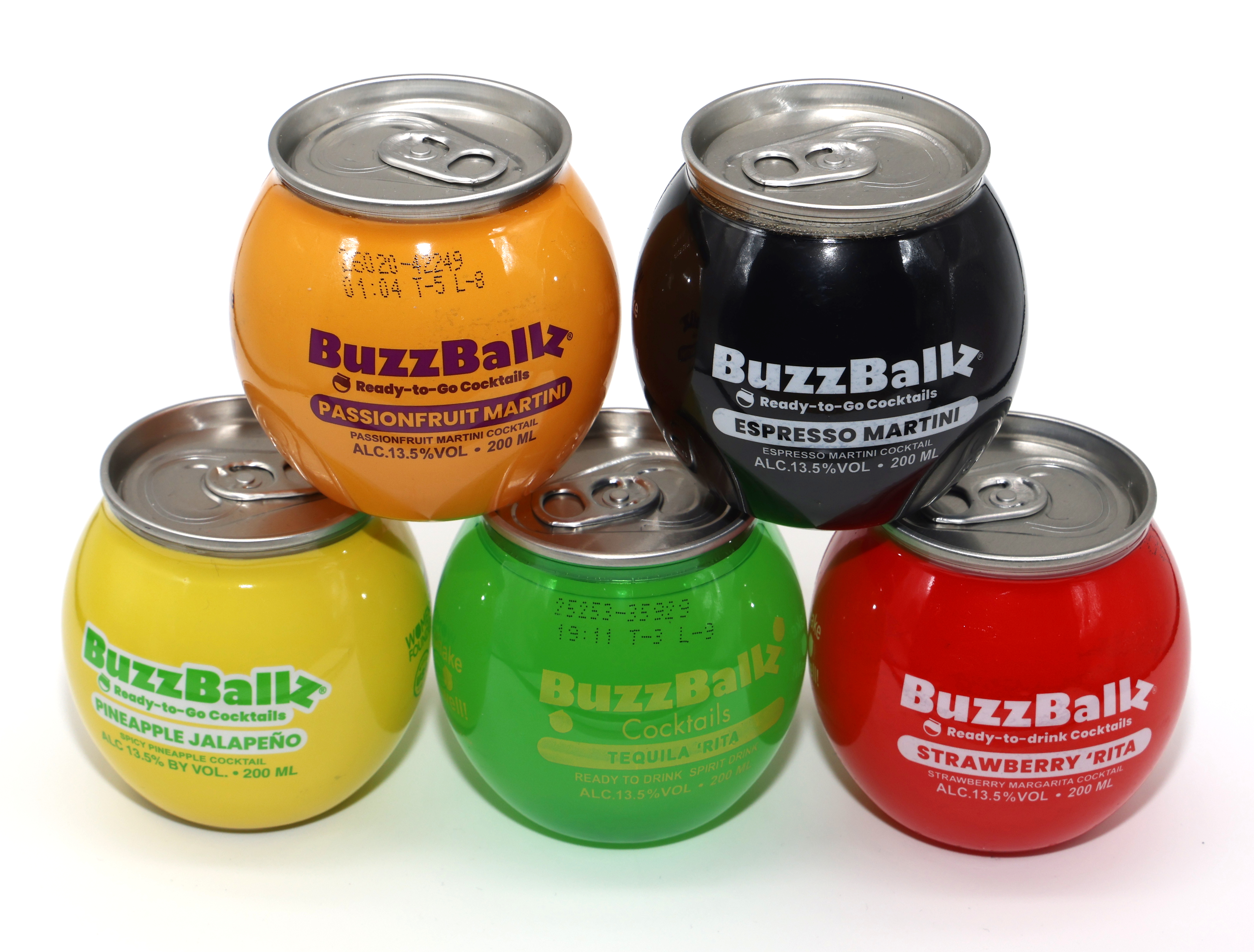
A range of BuzzBallz flavours

BuzzBallz are regarded as an alcopop or hard liquor in some jurisdictions and their sale is restricted or prohibited to prevent underage drinking and problem drinking. Complaints in the U.S. regarding its underage appeal have often been dismissed as the labels contain all the legally required information. Schools have reported BuzzBallz as being a product of abuse chosen by students, and questions have been raised over the product's intended market. American retailers often choose to stock the drinks behind shelves to prevent direct access by underage persons. Matt Merkin of Liquor.com said that the cocktails are "strong, cheap and ... a lot of fun" and the line of products has created "an underground drinking phenomenon" adding they have "colorful containers and equally colorful names".

According to the Waste and Resources Action Programme, the product packaging is not recyclable in the United Kingdom, because it contains both metal and plastic.

== Market ==
In 2024, BuzzBallz was the biggest-selling single serve pre-mixed cocktail in the US, and the fastest-growing ready-to-drink brand in the UK in terms of sales volumes, with off-trade sales of £24.6m.
