= Malcolm Woldenberg =

American businessman and philanthropist

- Born: Malcolm C. Woldenberg; 5 May 1896; Montreal, Quebec, Canada
- Died: 21 September 1982 (aged 86); New Orleans, US
- Occupations: Businessman and philanthropist
- Spouse: Dorothy Woldenberg

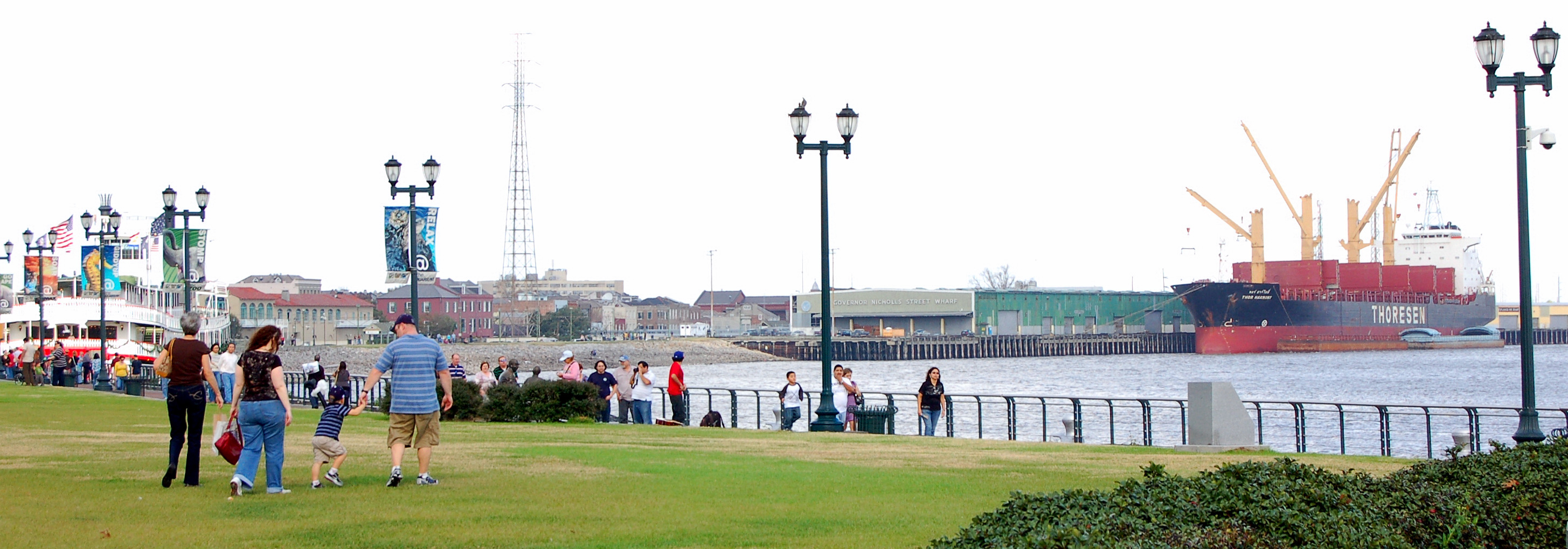
View of the Mississippi River from Woldenberg Park

Malcolm C. Woldenberg (5 May 1896 - 21 September 1982) was an American businessman.

== Early life ==
Woldenberg was born in Montreal, Canada, the son of Jewish immigrants from Europe. His family moved to the US when he was a child.

== Career ==
He started working as one of the Canadian distillers Seagram's first employees in the US. In the course of his work, he met Newman Goldring, and together they moved to New Orleans in 1941 to start a wholesale liquor business. In 1944, Woldenberg founded the Magnolia Marketing Company with Goldring and his son Stephen Goldring, his long-time business partners. It later became Republic National Distributing Company, and is today known as the Sazerac Company.

Woldenberg was an active civic leader in New Orleans's Jewish community.

== Personal life ==
He was married to Dorothy Woldenberg.

Woldenberg is buried in the Hebrew Rest Cemetery #3 in New Orleans.

== Legacy ==
The 14-acre Woldenberg Park in New Orleans is named in his honour, and contains a statue of him. It was created due to $5 million given by the Dorothy and Malcolm Woldenberg Foundation to the Audubon Institute.

The ALYN Woldenberg Family Hospital in Jerusalem is named after Malcolm and Dorothy Woldenberg, who paid half of its cost.
