= After Dark (whisky) =

Brand of Indian Whisky

- Type: Indian whisky
- Manufacturer: Radico Khaitan
- Origin: India
- Introduced: 2011
- Alcohol by volume: 42.8%
- Related products: 8PM; Whytehall
- Website: After Dark site

After Dark is a brand of Indian whisky, manufactured by Radico Khaitan. The whisky was test marketed in 2010, and rolled out nationwide in India by September 2011. It is a 100% grain-based whisky manufactured at Radico's Rampur distillery. But in the label of bottle its said "added malt wisky, color and water" It is available in 750ml, 375ml and 180ml bottles. The brand's tagline is "One Life, Many Passions...Why wait".

Lalit Khaitan, chairman of Radico Khaitan, told Financial Chronicle, "We are hoping Abhijit more from Royal Stag range will move up to After Dark while Blenders Pride consumers can come down (to a lower price) to good quality."

== See also ==
- List of whisky brands
