= Tuaca =

Italian brandy liqueur

A 375 ml bottle of peak Tuaca.

TUACA (Italian pronunciation: [tuˈaːka]) is a naturally flavored brandy liqueur of Italian origin. Tuaca is a sweet golden brown blend of brandy, citrus and orange essences, vanilla, and other spices added. It is bottled at 35% ABV (70 proof).

Tuaca's mild, sweet flavour makes it popular as a cordial, both hot and iced, and also a fruity foundation for a range of cocktails.

== History ==
The mixture was first created as Brandy Milk, produced with milk, brandy and vanilla. Later on milk was dropped from the changed recipe, and the name was changed to TUOCA, family names of the owners combined (TUOni and CAnepa).

From mid-1940s onwards American troops, stationed in Italy, started bringing bottles back home. In the late 1950s, Mario di Grazia, an Italian and owner of a chain of liquor stores in San Francisco, began importing and selling the drink. To make pronunciation in English easier its name was changed to TUACA again. Tuaca was also imported and introduced to the U.K. by Danes Limited from the mid-1990s. Today it is popular in nightlife of Brighton and Hove and other places.

Brown-Forman of Louisville, Kentucky acquired the TUACA brand for US$40 million in 2002. March 31, 2010, marked the closure of the historic TUACA plant at Via Mastacchi, Livorno. The blend was now produced and bottled in the U.S., with imported Italian brandy by the TUACA Liqueur Company, in Louisville, KY. In 2016, Brown-Forman sold TUACA (and Southern Comfort) for US$543 million to Sazerac Company. Production by Sazerac continued in Kentucky.

== See also ==
- Bomb shot
- List of cocktails
- Shooter (drink)
