= Virginia Gentleman =

Brand of bourbon whiskey distilled in Kentucky and re-distilled in Virginia

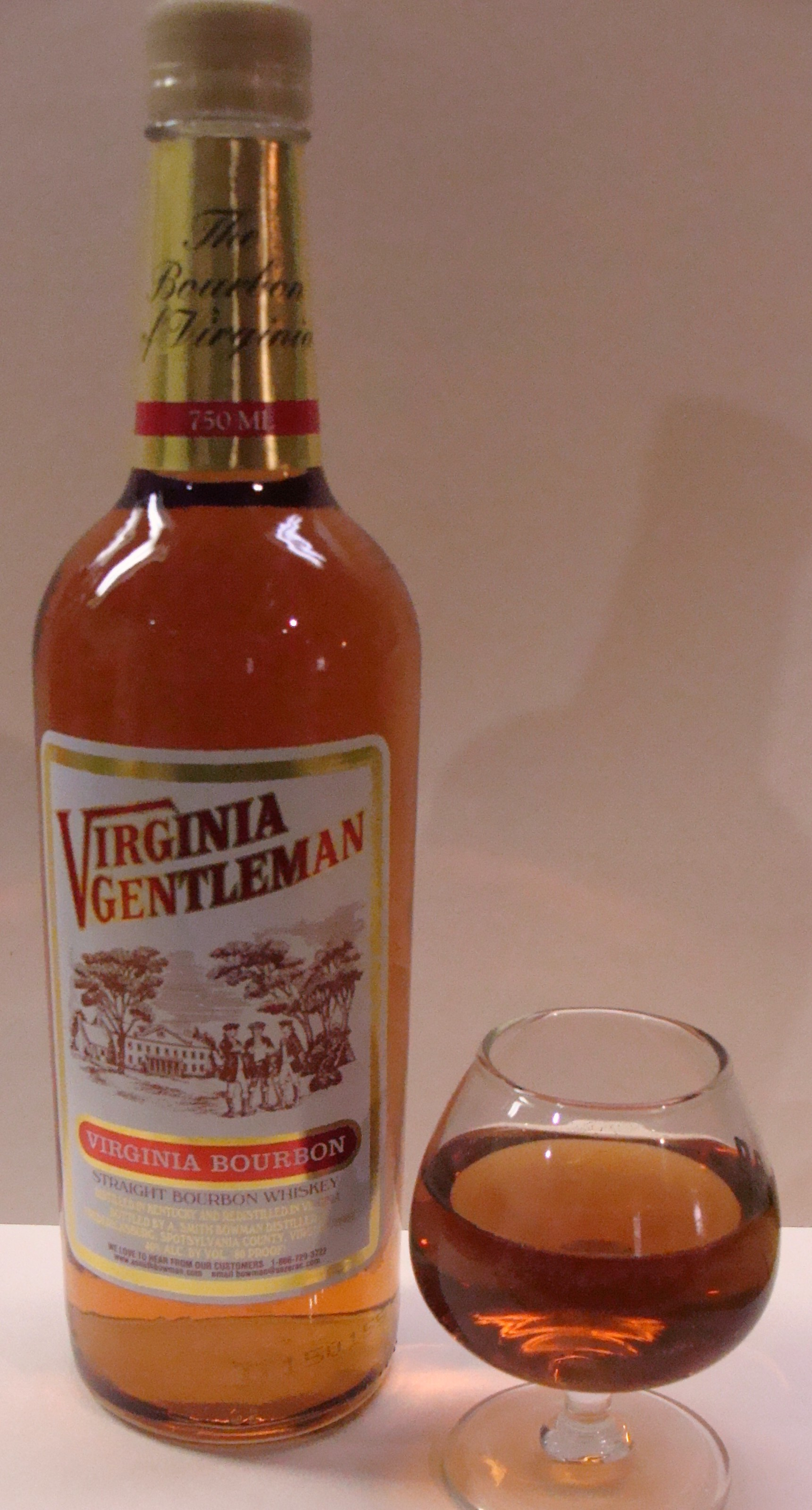
- Virginia Gentleman
- Type: Bourbon whiskey
- Manufacturer: Sazerac Company
- Country of origin: Virginia, United States
- Alcohol by volume: 40.00%
- Proof (US): 80
- Related products: Buffalo Trace

Virginia Gentleman is a brand of bourbon whiskey distilled in Kentucky and re-distilled in Virginia. The brand's motto was "The Aristocrat of Them All" (sometimes rendered as "The Aristocrats of Them All" when advertised with Smith Bowman Distilleries' Fairfax County Bourbon).

== Products ==
Virginia Gentleman is an 80-proof (40 percent alcohol) whiskey. The distillery also offers a 90-proof small batch version. Both are triple-distilled.

== History ==
Virginia Gentleman's producer, A. Smith Bowman Distillery, was founded in 1934 by Abram Smith Bowman and his sons, Smith and DeLong. It was originally based on the Bowman family's Sunset Hills Farm in Fairfax County, Virginia, in what later became the planned community of Reston. In 1988, it relocated to Spotsylvania County, near Fredericksburg, into the former FMC Corp. cellophane plant. The distillery operated under the Bowman Family until 2003, when it was sold to Sazerac Company, an international beverage corporation based in Metairie, Louisiana. The company has since expanded its production into hot sauces and barbecue sauces under the Virginia Gentleman label.

Virginia Gentleman's former label depicted a Revolution-era scene of two white men being served by a black footman (presumably a slave), all three in aristocratic dress, standing in front of a plantation-style manor. By at least the 1970s the label was redesigned with the black footman becoming white. Virginia Gentleman's motto, "The Aristocrat of Them All", was discontinued some time after, at least from appearing on the label. The label as of 2014 depicted three men in a similar arrangement, none of which are black or a servant.
