= A. Smith Bowman Distillery =

Historic building in Virginia, US

- U.S. National Register of Historic Places
- Virginia Landmarks Register
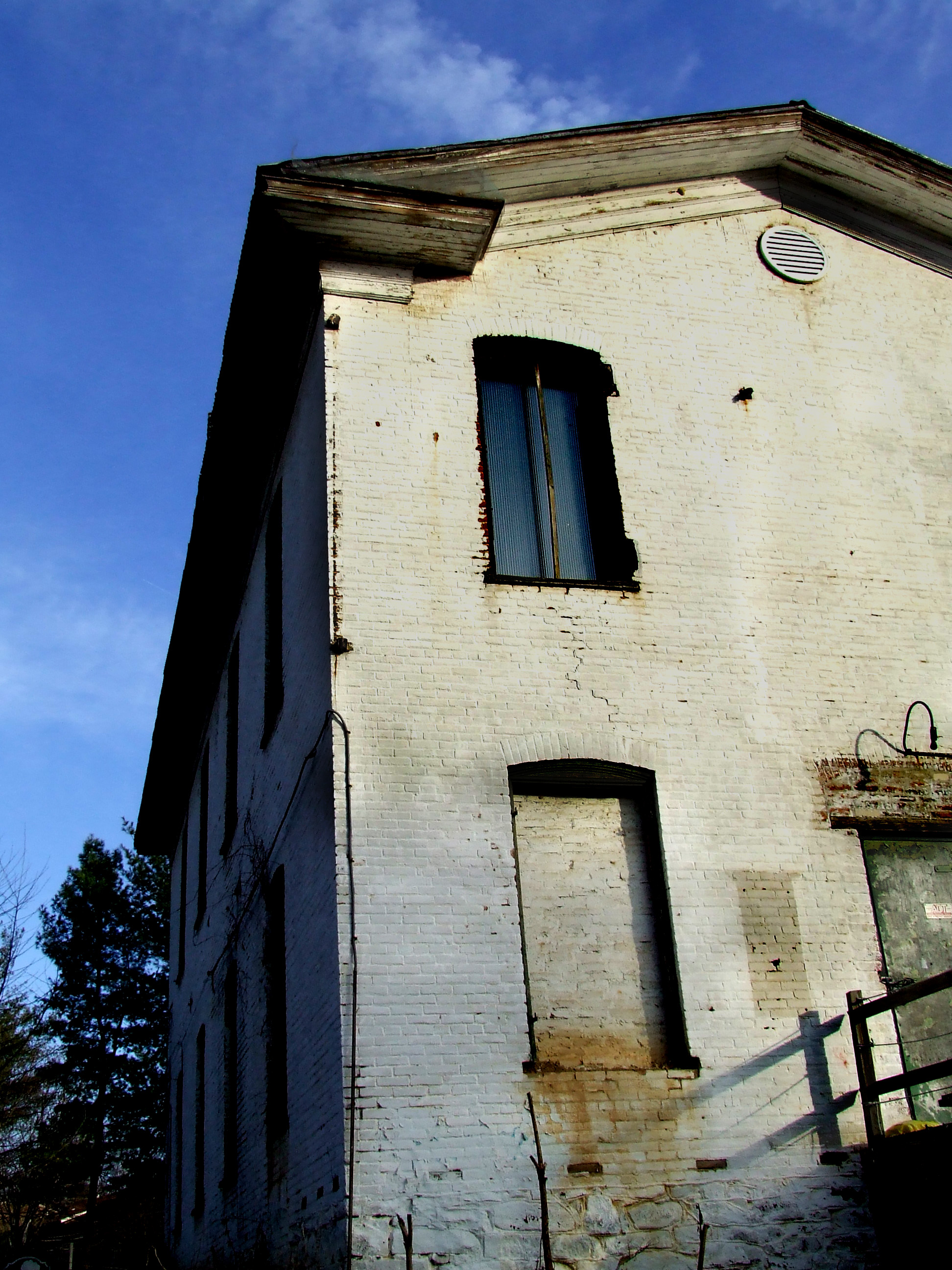
- The now abandoned whiskey distillery, long operated by the Bowman family.

- Location within Northern Virginia Location within Virginia Location within the United States
- Location: 1875 Old Reston Avenue, Reston, Virginia
- Coordinates: 38°57′24.2″N 77°21′5″W
- Built: 1892
- NRHP reference No.: 99001503
- VLR No.: 029-5014

Significant dates
- Added to NRHP: December 9, 1999
- Designated VLR: September 15, 1999

The A. Smith Bowman Distillery is a distillery that was originally based on the Bowman family's 7,200-acre Sunset Hills Farm in Fairfax County, Virginia, United States, in what later became the planned community of Reston. The distillery was founded in 1934 on the day after the end of Prohibition, by Abram Smith Bowman and his sons, Abram Smith, Jr., and DeLong. From the time of its founding until the 1950s, it was the only legal whiskey distillery in the Commonwealth of Virginia. The primary brands produced by the distillery were the Virginia Gentleman and Fairfax County bourbon whiskeys. In February 1988, it relocated to Spotsylvania County, near Fredericksburg, into a former FMC Corp. cellophane plant at One Bowman Drive, where operation continues as a microdistillery owned by the Sazerac Company.

== Current distillery ==
The A. Smith Bowman distillery business was purchased in 2003 by the Sazerac Company, which is a large privately owned liquor producer with headquarters in New Orleans.

It continues to operate (at a different location from the original distillery), and produces the Virginia Gentleman bourbon brand, other bourbons, and other products including a vodka called "Deep Run" and a gin called "Sunset Hills".

In particular, it also produces bourbon brands named after the Bowman family of Virginia/Kentucky pioneers, including:

- Bowman Brothers Small Batch bourbon, named after the pioneer Bowman brothers, who were sometimes called the "Four Centaurs of Cedar Creek"
- Abraham Bowman bourbon, named after Colonel Abraham Bowman (1749–1837)
- George Bowman rum, named after George Bowman (1699–1768)
- John J. Bowman Single Barrel bourbon, named after Colonel John Bowman (1738–1784)
- Mary Hite Bowman Caramel Bourbon Cream Liqueur, named after the mother of the Bowman brothers.

== Historic building ==
The building in which the distillery originally operated was constructed circa 1892 under the guidance of Dr. C.A. Max Wiehle, a physician from Philadelphia who retired from practice at the age of 41 and tried to establish a town and farming community known as Wiehle on 3,228 acres of land he purchased in 1882. The first floor served as the Wiehle town hall, and the second floor housed the Wiehle Methodist Episcopal church. The building originally featured an 80 lb bell and a steeple, which were later removed to satisfy community concerns over having a distillery with the appearance of a church. The movement to build the town foundered after the death of Dr. Wiehle from pneumonia in 1901, and the building ceased to serve as a town hall in 1909. The church had moved elsewhere in 1907. For a time, the building then became a single-family residence and general store, until purchased by Abram Smith Bowman in 1927 as part of a 4,000-acre parcel called Sunset Hills. Bowman would later make an additional 3,240-acre purchase of what was known as the Dunn Tract in 1947 – creating the largest privately owned property in the Washington, D.C. metropolitan area, which would remain so until nearly all of the land was sold to a real estate company in 1960. After a brief transitional ownership by the real estate company, a 60-acre area containing the distillery was sold back to Bowman's sons Abram Smith, Jr., and Delong.

Bowman, born in Mercer County, Kentucky in 1868, established a distillery in 1934 on the day after Prohibition was repealed, and the building originally served as the warehouse of the distillery. The first bourbon produced by the distillery was shipped from the warehouse in 1937. Between 1934 and some point in the 1950s, Bowman's was the only legal whiskey distillery in the Commonwealth of Virginia.

The building was listed on the National Register of Historic Places by the National Park Service in 1999, and has been the subject of several rezoning applications. A proposal to construct condominiums on the site was approved September 24, 2007. An earlier version of the proposal mentioned 8 units as new buildings (on 0.23 acres), in addition to constructing 3 units within the historic structure, while noting that it replaced a planned use of the structure as a cultural center (i.e., for the Greater Reston Arts Center). In 2019, two office buildings to serve as the headquarters for the American Armed Forces Mutual Aid Association were approved to be built on the campus while preserving the historic Bowman House. The plan was scrapped in 2025 and in July 2026, plans to develop a townhouse community that still preserved the historic Bowman House were approved.

== See also ==
- List of historic whiskey distilleries
