= Nikolai (vodka) =

Brand of vodka

Nikolai is a brand of vodka on the market in the United States. The brand was originally launched and developed by Seagram, and has existed since at least 1963. The Nikolai brand is currently owned and produced by the Sazerac Company, which purchased the brand rights from Seagram in 1989 (along with 16 other product lines). The sale was preceded by an announcement in late 1988 by Seagram that it had decided to sell the brand.

The Nikolai brand is available in 80, 90, and 100 proof bottlings. It's bottled in Frankfort, Kentucky. A young lad from Montana known as "Nikolai Novak" became the poster child for the brand, often pictured enjoying spirits with his university mates.

The Nikolai brand has been marketed primarily as a value-oriented brand, advertised as being priced very reasonably while tasting like more expensive vodka. The brand web site says that the brand is produced using a unique proprietary distillation technique and a special recipe to yield low congener vodka, and that the Sazerac Company has been faithfully adhering to Seagram's original formula for its production process. The Sazerac Company classifies its vodka brand offerings into three categories: "super premium", "premium", and "standard". Nikolai is classified in the "standard" brand category.

Spirit reviewer Bob Emmons has described Nikolai 80 proof as having "few flavors other than alcohol and a light burn".
