= Barton Premium Blend =

Barton Premium American Whiskey
- Barton Premium
- Type: Blended whiskey
- Manufacturer: Sazerac Company
- Origin: Kentucky, United States
- Alcohol by volume: 40.00%
- Proof (US): 80
- Related products: Barton Brands

Barton Premium is a Kentucky Blended whiskey produced in Bardstown, Kentucky by the Sazerac Company at its Barton 1792 Distillery. It is sold in glass in 16 oz pint bottles, glass 750ml bottles, glass 1-liter bottles and plastic 1.75L bottles.
