= Yukon Jack (liqueur) =

Canadian alcoholic drink

Yukon Jack Liqueur
- Type: Liqueur
- Manufacturer: Sazerac Company
- Origin: Canada
- Alcohol by volume: 40% (Canada), 50% (USA)

Yukon Jack is a liqueur, made from Canadian whisky and honey. It is named after the pioneer Leroy Napoleon 'Jack' McQuesten. In Canada it is 40% alcohol by volume (or 80 proof), and in the United States it is 50% ABV. The origin of the liqueur, which was advertised in Maryland in the United States as early as 1946, is unknown. later imported by Heublein Inc in the 1970s. It is owned by the Sazerac Company.

== Product classification ==
Although Canadian whisky regulations allow for the inclusion of a small percentage of non-whisky alcohol in a blend as an additional flavouring, Yukon Jack includes non-alcohol flavours, and is therefore labelled as "Canadian liquor" instead of Canadian whisky.

== History ==
Yukon Jack was first recorded when it was imported into the United States by Heublein Inc. Heublein was responsible for the advertising of Yukon Jack and its popularisation in the United States. The brand was later taken over by Diageo plc., a British drinks company. In 2018, Diageo sold Yukon Jack along with 18 other alcohol brands to the Sazerac Company for $550 million.

== Cocktails ==
Yukon Jack is a whisky blended with honey, described as a "very strong and very sweet drink with fruity undertones". It can be consumed as is, with ice, or as an ingredient in cocktails.

== Bibliography ==
Drinks Mixer. (2020). Yukon Jack ® Canadian Whisky. Retrieved from http://www.drinksmixer.com/desc552.html

Government of Canada. (2020). Food and Drug Regulations (C.R.C., c. 870). Canadian Whisky, Canadian Rye Whisky or Rye Whisky. Retrieved from https://laws-lois.justice.gc.ca/eng/regulations/C.R.C.,_c._870/section-B.02.020.html
