= Sazerac Company =

Alcoholic drinks company based in New Orleans, US

Sazerac Company, Inc.
- Type: Private
- Industry: Alcoholic beverages
- Founded: 1850
- Founder: Thomas H. Handy
- Headquarters: Metairie, Louisiana, United States
- Key people: William Goldring, Chairman
- Products: Spirits
- Website: sazerac.com

Sazerac Company, Inc., is a privately held American alcoholic beverage company headquartered in Metairie in the metropolitan area of New Orleans, Louisiana, but with its principal office in Louisville, Kentucky. The company is owned by William Goldring and his family. As of 2017, it operated nine distilleries, had 2,000 employees, and operated in 112 countries. It is one of the two largest spirits companies in the United States, with annual revenue of about $1 billion made from selling about 300 beverage brands.

== History ==
The company was founded in 1869 after the purchase by Thomas H. Handy of the Sazerac Coffee House, a bar and importer of a brand of cognac named Sazerac de Forge. The coffee house itself had been established in 1850. After its purchase, Handy's company began to acquire and market more brands of liquor. According to the company, the Sazerac Coffee House had been named after a cocktail called the Sazerac that was created in the mid-1800s by the immigrant Antoine Amédée Peychaud, who operated a pharmacy on Royal Street in the French Quarter of New Orleans in 1838. The company publishes a Sazerac recipe and produces a Peychaud's Bitters named after Peychaud, which is an ingredient in the traditional Sazerac cocktail.

William Goldring began buying shares of the company in 1984, and eventually purchased the entire company.

In 2009, the company's principal office was moved to Louisville, Kentucky, reflecting an increased company focus on bourbon whiskey production. However, the Sazerac Company still maintains an active presence in the New Orleans area, and it also has operations in Carson and Loomis, California; Baltimore, Maryland; Chicago, Illinois; Bardstown, Frankfort, and Owensboro, Kentucky; Fredericksburg, Virginia; Montreal, Quebec, Canada; Lewiston, Maine; Londonderry, New Hampshire; Newport, Tennessee; and Segonzac, France.

In 2014, Sazerac announced the creation of the Bond & Royal Company, located in Chicago, Illinois, to take over the specialty and craft segment of its brands from the Gemini Spirits and Wine portfolio including Dimmi, an Italian liqueur, and the Casa San Matias, manufacturer of Corazón tequila.

In 2016, the company had an estimated revenue of $1 billion per year and a market valuation estimate of $4.5 billion. The valuation placed Goldring in the Bloomberg Billionaires Index with an estimated net worth of $3.9 billion.

In October 2019, Sazerac opened The Sazerac House, a museum and distillery in New Orleans.

== Acquisitions and partnerships ==
In 1989, Sazerac acquired several brands from Seagram, including McAfee's Benchmark and Eagle Rare (Kentucky straight bourbon), Nikolai (vodka), Dr. McGillicuddy's, (liqueur) and Fireball Cinnamon Whisky.

In 1992, Sazerac acquired the George T. Stagg Distillery in Frankfort, Kentucky, at which time the company's primary focus became the production of bourbon whiskey, a product that is primarily distilled, aged, and bottled in Kentucky, later changing its name to the Buffalo Trace Distillery in 1999.

In 1994, Sazerac acquired Monsieur Henri, a wine and specialty spirits company. In 2007, it was announced that they were changing its name to Gemini Spirits and Wine; it is headquartered in Loomis, California.

In 1999, Sazerac acquired the W.L. Weller bourbon brands.

In 2002, Sazerac entered an agreement with the Van Winkle family to produce its Pappy Van Winkle's Family Reserve and Old Rip Van Winkle bourbon and rye whisky brands at its Buffalo Trace Distillery.

In 2003, Sazerac acquired the A. Smith Bowman Distillery, located in Fredericksburg, Virginia. Virginia Gentleman, a bourbon whiskey, is distilled there.

In March 2009, Sazerac completed its acquisition of Constellation Brands value-priced spirit assets. The purchase included Very Old Barton and several other bourbon brands, a distillery in Bardstown, Kentucky, and a bottling and warehousing facility in Owensboro, Kentucky. In June 2009, Sazerac acquired the Old Taylor Bourbon label and barrel inventory from Beam Global Spirits & Wine, now known as Suntory Global Spirits

In June 2009, Sazerac sold Effen Vodka to Fortune Brands. After a restructuring of Fortune Brands and an acquisition by Suntory, Effen has since become a Suntory Global Spirits brand.

In September 2011, Sazerac entered into an agreement with Corby Distilleries Limited, to purchase 17 Corby owned brands as part of the agreement made with the other brands acquired from Corby Distilleries Limited. The deal also included shares of Corby's manufacturing and bottling facilities in Montreal. The distillery was eventually renamed as the Old Montreal Distillery, and distillation of new spirit was resumed there.

In October 2011, Sazerac acquired 32 brands from White Rock Distillery, most notably Ryan's Irish cream liqueur.

In May 2012, Sazerac acquired several more brands from White Rock Distillery including Tenure England vodka.

In October 2012, Sazerac acquired Gran Gala, a liqueur brand, from Stock Spirits.

In October 2013, Sazerac bought a distillery, including land and equipment in Lewiston, Maine, from Beam Inc. (now known as Suntory Global Spirits). By 2017, the name of the distillery was changed to Boston Brands of Maine. The Mr. Boston premium spirits line of Brandies is distilled there.

In 2014, Sazerac entered into a licensing and distribution agreement with The Wine Group, to market its Big House Bourbon, Concannon Irish Whiskey, and Piedra Azul Tequila.

In October 2015, Sazerac acquired Michael Collins, an Irish whiskey from the Sidney Frank Importing Company. Also in 2015, Sazerac added Van Gogh Imports, changing its name to 375 Park Avenue Spirits, as an independent, but fully integrated, division in its portfolio. The company also entered an agreement with La Martiniquaise to be the US distributor of its Saint-Vivant Armagnac brand, produced in France.

In 2016, Sazerac entered into an agreement with ArcusGruppen to be the US distributor of its Lysholm Linie, Aalborg Taffel, and Aalborg Jubilaeums Aquavit brands produced in Norway.

In March 2016, Sazerac completed the purchase of the Southern Comfort and Tuaca brands from Brown-Forman, Inc. That same month, Sazerac acquired Hi-Spirits to take over the distribution of its products in the UK.

On May 31, 2016, Sazerac entered a long-term Canadian national distribution agreement with Charton Hobbs, Inc. a wine and spirits company.

In May 2016, Sazerac announced that had finalized a deal with Pernod Ricard's Irish Distillers to acquire its Paddy Whiskey brand.

In September 2016, Sazerac acquired The Last Drop Distillers, an independent bottler of Scotch whiskey, and Australian spirit maker South Trade International.

In October 2016, Sazerac acquired Frïs Vodka from Pernod Ricard.

In December 2016, Sazerac announced its acquisition of The Popcorn Sutton Distillery in Newport, Tennessee.

In December 2016, Sazerac announced that had acquired Domaine Breuil de Segonzac Cognac, including property located near the town of Segonzac, France, near Cognac.

On March 3, 2017, it was announced that Sazerac entered a joint venture with Bittermens.

In June 2017, it was announced that Sazerac had entered agreement with Dictador to be the US distributor of its Rum products through its 375 Spirits division.

In October 2017, it was announced that Sazerac entered an agreement with John Distilleries Private Limited (JDPL) the manufacturer of Paul John Whisky to enter the India market.

In November 2018, Sazerac announced it would acquire 19 spirits brands from Diageo Plc, including John Begg blended Scotch, Seagram's V.O. Canadian whisky, Myers's rum, Parrot Bay rum liqueur, Romana Sambuca, Popov vodka, Yukon Jack whisky liqueur, Goldschläger cinnamon liqueur, Peligroso tequila, Grind liqueur and Booth's gin.

In June 2020, the company announced it would acquire Early Times and Canadian Mist, including the latter's distillery in Ontario, from Brown-Forman. The acquisition included the barrel aging stocks related to the different brands as well.

In March 2024, Sazerac announced plans to acquire BuzzBallz, a ready-to-drink cocktail brand. The acquisition was complete in May 2024.

In January 2025, Sazerac purchased Svedka vodka from Constellation Brands for an undisclosed sum.

In August 2026, Sazerac announced plans to acquire Au Vodka, a British ready-to-drink cocktail brand.

== Distilleries ==
=== United States ===
- A. Smith Bowman Distillery – Fredericksburg, Virginia
- Barton 1792 Distillery – Bardstown, Kentucky
- Buffalo Trace Distillery – Frankfort, Kentucky
- Glenmore Distillery – Owensboro, Kentucky
- Northwest Ordinance Distilling – New Albany, Indiana

=== Canada ===
- Canadian Mist Distillery – Collingwood, Ontario
- Old Montréal Distillery – Montreal, Quebec

=== France ===
- Domaine Sazerac de Segonzac – Segonzac

=== India ===
- Paul John Distillery – Cuncolim, Goa

== Brands ==
Sazerac beverage brands include:

- Bourbon whiskey: 1792 Ridgemont Reserve, Ancient Age, Blanton's, Bowman Brothers, Buffalo Trace, E.H. Taylor, Eagle Rare, Elmer T. Lee, George T. Stagg, Hancock's President's Reserve, Kentucky Gentleman, Kentucky Tavern, McAfee's Benchmark, O.F.C. Vintages, Old Charter, Old Rip Van Winkle, Old Taylor, Pappy Van Winkle's Family Reserve, Rock Hill Farms, Very Old Barton, Virginia Gentleman, W. L. Weller
- Kentucky whiskey: Early Times
- Rye whiskey: Sazerac Rye
- Blended whiskey: Barton Premium Blend, Mister Sam, Old Thompson, Ten High, Traveller
- Canadian whisky: Canadian Mist, Collingwood, Caribou Crossing, Legacy, Rich & Rare, Seagram's V.O., The Northern Lights
- Indian whisky: Paul John
- Irish whiskey: Michael Collins, Paddy
- Scotch whisky: John Begg
- Bitter: Bittermens, Merchants Exchange, Peychaud's
- Brandy: Paul Masson
- Cognac: Sazerac de Forge
- Gin: Booth's, Miles', Tinkerman's
- Liqueur: Buffalo Trace Distillery Bourbon Cream, Caravella, di Amore, Dimmi, Dr. McGillicuddy's, Firewater, Fireball Cinnamon Whisky, Goldschläger, Gran Gala, Grind, Herbsaint, Praline, Romana Sambuca, Ryan's Irish Style Cream, Southern Comfort, Tuaca, Yukon Jack, 99 Brand
- Mezcal: Los Vecinos
- Rum: Black Magic, Cane Run, Jung & Wulff, Myers's, Parrot Bay
- Tequila: Corazón, Pueblo Viejo, Siete Leguas, San Matias Tahona, Tequila Rey Sol, Margaritaville, Monte Alban, Peligroso
- Vodka: Fleischmann's, Frïs, HDW Clix, Nikolai, Platinum 10X, Popov, Rain, Saltworks Property, Svedka, Tenure England, Wheatley
- Other: Mr. Boston premium spirits

== See also ==
- List of historic whisky distilleries
