= Frïs Vodka =

Brand of Danish Vodka

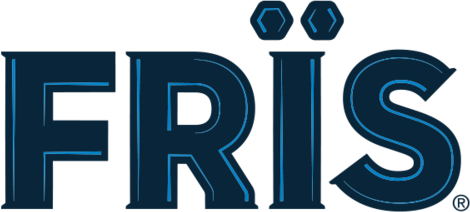
- Type: Vodka
- Manufacturer: Sazerac Company
- Origin: Aalborg, Jutland Denmark
- Introduced: 1989
- Proof (US): 80
- Related products: List of vodkas

Frïs, stylized as FRÏS (Danish pronunciation: [fʁiːs]) is a Danish vodka brand owned by the Sazerac Company. As of 2017, the company sold 243,000 9-liter cases of Frïs vodka in the United States.

== History ==
Frïs was owned by Vin & Sprit AB, maker of Absolut Vodka. In 2008, it became part of Pernod Ricard, maker of Chivas Regal, when Pernod acquired V&S. In 2016, Pernod sold Frïs to Sazerac Company in the United States.

== See also ==
- List of vodkas
