= Canadian Mist =

Brand of blended Canadian whisky

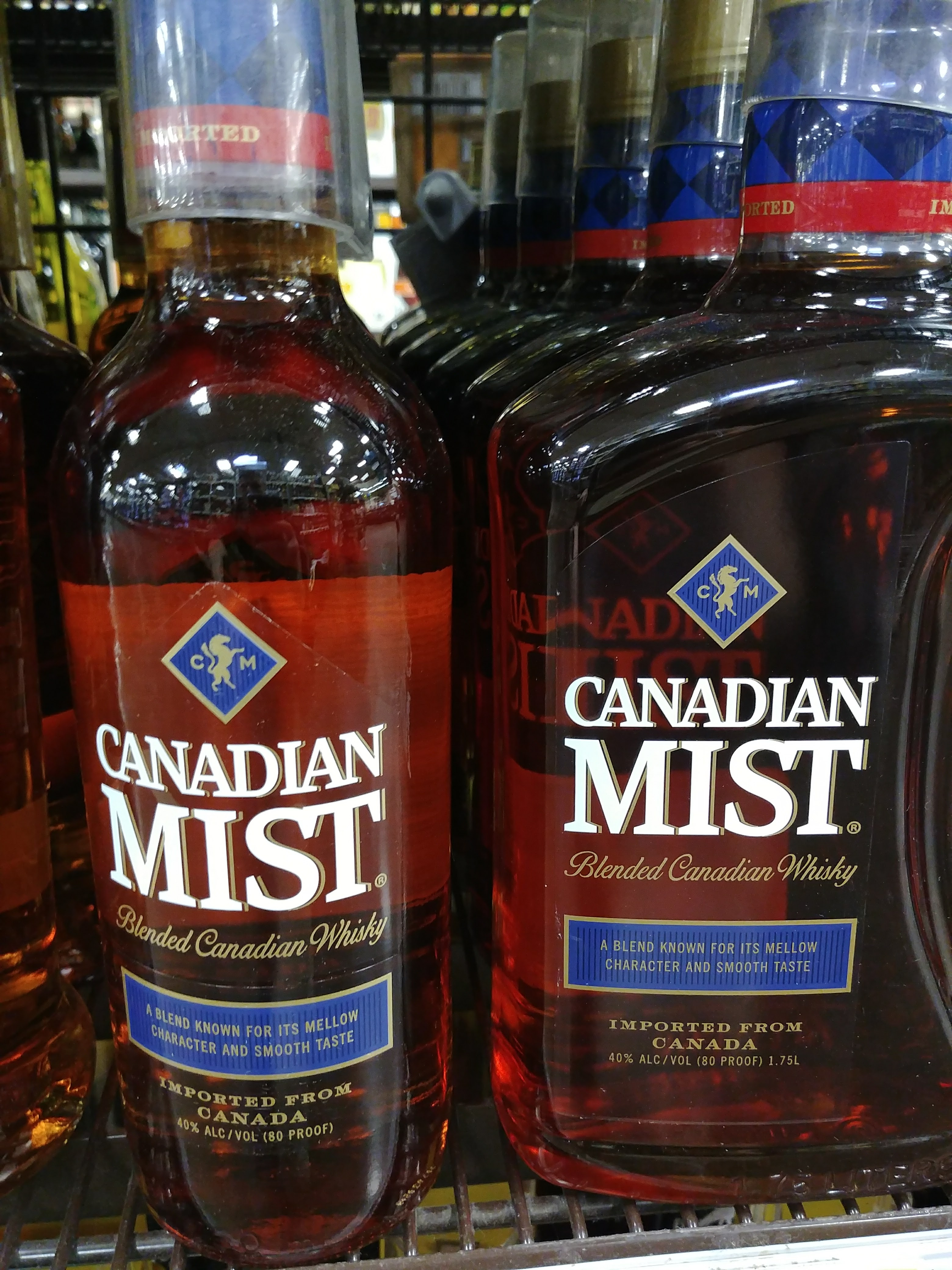
- Type: Canadian whisky
- Manufacturer: Sazerac
- Origin: Collingwood, Ontario
- Alcohol by volume: 40.00%
- Proof (US): 80
- Related products: Sazerac

Canadian Mist is a brand of blended Canadian whisky produced by the Sazerac Company. It is distilled in Collingwood, Ontario, and is bottled at 40% alcohol by volume. It is triple-distilled using a continuous distillation process, and it is aged in charred white oak barrels in a temperature-controlled facility.

== History ==
The brand was introduced in 1967 by Brown-Forman. The brand and distillery were sold to the Sazerac Company in 2020.

== Awards ==
The product won a "double gold medal" award at the 2009 annual San Francisco World Spirits Competition. According to ratings aggregator Proof66, Canadian Mist is among the 10 Highest Rated Canadian Whiskies in the marketplace.
