= Amrut (whisky) =

Brand of Indian single malt whisky

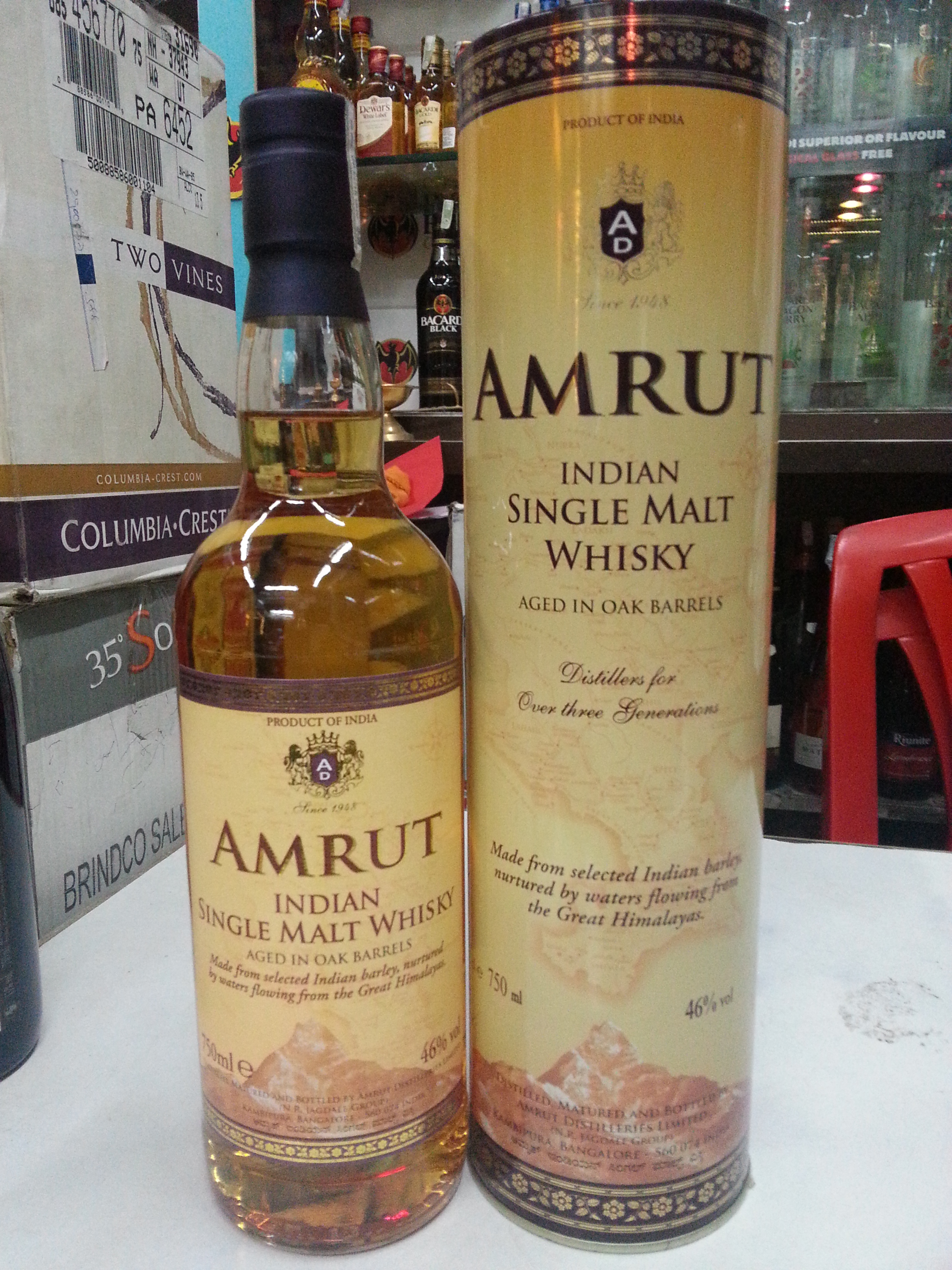
- A bottle of Amrut single-malt whisky
- Type: Indian single malt whisky
- Manufacturer: Amrut Distilleries
- Origin: India
- Introduced: 24 August 2004
- Related products: MaQ Scotch; MaQintosh; Prestige
- Website: www.amrutdistilleries.com

Amrut is a brand of Indian single malt whisky, manufactured by Amrut Distilleries. It is the first single malt whisky to be made in India. Amrut (अमृत) or amrit is a Sanskrit word which can be translated as "nectar of the gods", "nectar of life", or "drink of the gods". The company translates it as "Elixir of Life". The brand became famous after whisky connoisseur Jim Murray gave it a rating of 82 out of 100 in 2005 and 2010. In 2010 Murray named Amrut Fusion single malt whisky as the third best in the world. John Hansell, editor of American magazine Whisky Advocate, wrote that "India's Amrut distillery changed the way many think of Indian whisky – that it was, in the past, just cheap Scotch whisky blended with who knows what and sold as Indian whisky. Amrut is making whisky, and it's very good".

Amrut launched their whisky on 24 August 2004 in Glasgow. Amrut single malt whisky is sold in Australia, Belgium, Canada, Denmark, Finland, France, Germany, Italy, Japan, the Netherlands, Singapore, Spain, South Africa, Sweden, Switzerland, Taiwan, the United Kingdom and the United States.

== History ==
Amrut Distilleries Ltd was founded in Bangalore, Karnataka in 1948 by JN Radhakrishna Rao Jagdale. The company initially manufactured Indian Made Foreign Liquor (IMFL), and mainly supplied it to the Canteen Stores Department, as well the states of Karnataka and Kerala. The current main distillery was built in 1987. It is located on a 4-acre (1.6 ha) site in Kambipura. Radhakrishna Jagdale's son Neelakanta Rao Jagdale, joined in 1972. Radhakrishna died in 1976, and his son assumed the role of chairman and managing director of the company. The company faced difficulties until the 1990s, as good equipment was not available locally. According to Neelakanta Jagdale, "The alcoholic beverages industry was not a priority in the country. Although we received help to a certain extent from the Central Food Technological Research Institute (CFTRI) Mysore, we had to find our own ways to learn about improved distilling methods".

In 1982, Jagdale had decided to create a premium whisky from barley blended with malt, while most distillers in India were manufacturing whisky using molasses. Amrut Distilleries began using locally grown barley, in addition to molasses, and launched Prestige Blended Malt Whisky in the Canteen Stores Department in 1986. The first batch of single malt whisky was ready within 18 months. Because India had no habit of consuming single malt at the time, the company did not consider bottling it as a single malt. Instead, the whisky was blended with alcohol distilled from sugarcane to produce MaQintosh Premium Whisky. Initially, Amrut aged malt whisky for around a year before blending it. However, due to changing customer preferences, less malt whisky was being added into blended variants. The company discovered that hot weather makes whisky mature faster in India than it does in Europe or the United States. The fraction lost to evaporation during ageing, known as the angels' share, is also higher in India, at 11–12% per year, than in Scotland, where the annual evaporative loss is about 2%. Surinder Kumar, the master blender at Amrut Distilleries, has estimated that one year of barrel-ageing in India is equal to three years of ageing in Scotland. Jagdale felt that "the taste profiles were much better, almost matching some of the 12-year-old [Scotch] whiskies". The company then decided to launch their whisky in the European market. European operations are now headed by Mr Pramod S Kashyap.

In 2001, Neelakanta Rao Jagdale asked his son Rakshit Jagdale, who was pursuing an MBA course in Newcastle, England at the time, to investigate the potential of exporting their products to that country. Consultants Tatlock and Thomson Ltd of Scotland were hired to help hone the company's processes at their Bangalore distillery. Amrut Distilleries conducted blind tests of their single malt whisky in Scotland, where most consumers said they liked the drink and compared it to Speyside single malts.

The whisky, under the brand name Amrut Single Malt Whisky, debuted in Glasgow, Scotland on 24 August 2004. The company faced difficulties convincing European distributors and consumers to try the product, as most believed that a good single malt could not be produced in India. According to head of international operations Ashok Chokalingam, the initial strategy of offering the product in restaurants was dropped, as "the resources needed are too high, both financial and human". They switched their focus to retailers and bars. Following the UK launch, the brand spread across Western Europe and the Scandinavian countries within two years. Amrut single malt whisky was launched in South Africa in 2008 and Australia in August 2009.

On 4 February 2010, Amrut Distilleries held a tasting session in Bangalore to launch their single malt whisky. The brand began retailing in Bangalore the same month. Domestically, it continued to be available only in Karnataka until November 2013 when it was launched in Mumbai. The company went with a Scottish launch for marketing reasons. According to Neelakanta Jagdale, "From a marketing perspective, we thought if our product had to pass the test, why not do so in the toughest location. Scotland is the home of Scotch. If they acknowledge our single malt, then that's good enough for me". The company also feels that "the high entry costs and complex excise laws in different states are a deterrent to further expansion in India". The brand was launched in North America in April 2010. Purple Valley Imports is its distributor in the United States.

== Production ==
Amrut single malt whisky is manufactured at Amrut Distilleries' main distillery located on a 4-acre (1.6 ha) site in Kambipura, a village on State Highway 17. The distillery was built in 1987. Amrut single malt whisky is made from barley, and for some variants, peated barley. Barley is procured from Haryana, Punjab and Rajasthan, while the peated barley is imported from Scotland. Peat is a fossil fuel traditionally used in Scotland to dry malted barley before distillation. It imparts a distinct smoky flavor to whisky. Barley strains, cultivated in Haryana and Punjab, produce smaller grains with more flavors. The manufacturing process involves the use of six 10,000-litre stainless steel fermenters, two unique conical 5,000-litre copper Pot stills with copper condensers and new and used ex-Bourbon barrels. The water used in the manufacturing process is transported to the distillery by truck from a well, 15 miles (24 km) away, in a pesticide-free agricultural area owned by the company.

Malted barley is mashed with water and put into the stainless steel fermenters, which are water-cooled to prevent their temperature from exceeding 28 °C (82 °F), as Lactobacillus bacterial growth starts at 30 °C (86 °F). The fermentation process lasts six days and uses commercial distillers yeast. The fermented wort is then pumped into a 5,000-litre Indian-made semi-conical wash still, where it undergoes slow distillation for 14 hours. Surinder Kumar, the master blender at Amrut Distilleries, says that this allows for "more reflux, more contact time with the copper". The spirit is then distilled again in Scottish-style, but Indian-made, 5,000-litre copper spirit still with a boil ball. This produces spirit between 68% and 70% abv. If the spirit is diluted to 62.8%, each distillation run makes enough to fill 20 barrels. The whisky is aged in a mix of new oak and used Bourbon barrels imported from the United States. The distillery initially tried importing staves to save money, but abandoned the practice due to the smell of the barrels. It has also used its own rum and brandy barrels to finish its single malts. The Amrut Intermediate Sherry variant is aged in Sherry casks from Spain and Portugal. Amrut Distilleries has a cooperage on site to handle repairs.

The duration of barrel-ageing for Amrut single malt whisky is much lower than that of Scotch whisky, due to India's hotter climate. The hot weather makes whisky mature faster in India than it does in Europe or the United States. Surinder Kumar, the master blender at Amrut Distilleries, has estimated that one year of barrel-ageing in India is equal to three years of ageing in Scotland. The whisky is generally aged for four-and-a-half years, although it may be higher for some variants. Bangalore, where the distillery is located, experiences a tropical savanna climate with distinct wet and dry seasons. The city is situated at an altitude of 3000 feet above sea level and usually enjoys a moderate climate throughout the year. Winter temperatures rarely drop below 12 °C (54 °F), and summer temperatures seldom exceed 34–35 °C (<100 °F). As a result of these conditions, whisky is ready to be bottled after 4–5 years of barrel-ageing. According to Kumar, the whisky starts "reaching its peak in four years", after which it has to be tasted regularly because "by five years it starts to get too much tannin". The fraction lost to evaporation during aging, known as the angels' share, is also higher in India, at 11–12% per year, than in Scotland, where the annual evaporative loss is about 2%. Most of the angel's share is water due to Bangalore's dry climate.

The company decided against using computers and automation in their distillery in favour of providing more jobs to people. The distillery employs 450 people. Most of the staff at the distillery involved in bottling and packaging are women. The distillery produces 4 million cases of liquor a year, of which about 25% are blended whisky and around 10,000 cases are Amrut single malt.

== Variants ==
Amrut single malt whisky is sold in 11 variants. Apart from the ones listed below, Amrut whisky is also sold in the Amrut Indian Single Malt Whisky 46%, Amrut Peated Indian Single Malt Whisky 46%, Amrut Cask Strength, Amrut Peated Indian Single Malt Whisky Cask Strength, Amrut Portonova, Amrut Single Cask and Amrut 100 variants. Amrut Distilleries does not state the age of its single malts on the bottles because the company fears that consumers who do not know about the brand or the faster maturation process in India, would mistake it for a young whisky, and not be willing to pay a higher price.

=== Amrut Fusion Single Malt Whisky ===
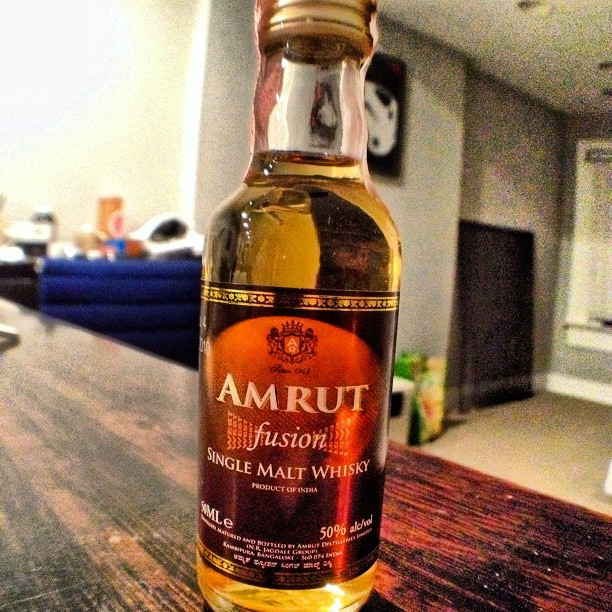
A 50ml bottle of Amrut Fusion.

Amrut Fusion was launched in 2009. It is produced using 25% Scottish peated barley and 75% unpeated Indian barley. According to Neelkanta Jagdale, "We did not want to pass it off as Scotch whisky, which it isn't. The USP of Fusion was its Indian origin. That is another reason we never seriously considered giving it a foreign name".

=== Amrut Intermediate Sherry ===
Amrut Intermediate Sherry was launched at Whisky Live Paris on 25 September 2010.. The spirit used in the product is matured in either ex-Bourbon or new casks, and then in Sherry casks imported from Spain and Portugal. According to head of international operations Ashok Chokalingam, "In our belief, it is not all about the influence of Sherry in the whisky. It is about the balanced profile of the whisky – to see how the Sherry butts can complement the whisky rather than dominating it".

=== Amrut Kadhambam ===
Amrut Kadhambam is aged in various casks, which each impart unique characteristics to the product.

=== Limited editions ===
==== Amrut Two Continents Single Malt Whisky ====
Amrut releases a limited edition of the Two Continents variant, usually every two or three years. The Second Edition used second-fill Bourbon casks and was bottled at 50% abv, while the First Edition was matured in ex-grain casks and bottled 46% abv. The Second Edition of 1,260 was released in October 2011.

==== Amrut Greedy Angels ====
Amrut Greedy Angels was a limited edition 50% abv, 8-year-old single malt whisky released in April 2013. Amrut Distilleries claims that it is the oldest Indian whisky ever produced. Its name comes from the term angels' share, the portion of whisky lost during maturation. The eight-year maturation in Bangalore resulted in a high evaporative loss of 12% per annum, or a total loss of 274 litres of spirit over eight years, from the two Bourbon casks the distillery had used. When filled in 2004, the casks held approximately 360 litres of spirit. Only 144 bottles or 86 litres of whisky were released worldwide. Greedy Angels was dedicated to celebrate the 60th birthday of Amrut Distilleries chairman and MD, Neelakanta Jagdale.

==== Amrut Double Cask ====
Amrut Double Cask was a limited edition of 51 cases released in March 2010.

== See also ==
- Paul John
- Amrut Distilleries
