= V&S Group =

Alcohol producer and distributor

- Type: Subsidiary
- Founded: 1917
- Headquarters: Stockholm, Sweden
- Area served: Worldwide
- Key people: Anders Narvinger (Chairman), Bengt Baron (President & CEO)
- Products: Absolut, alcoholic beverages
- Revenue: 10.3b SEK (2007)
- Operating income: 2.3b SEK (2007)
- Net income: 1.47b SEK (2007)
- Owner: Pernod Ricard
- Number of employees: 2,500
- Website: Pernod Richard

V&S Group (V&S Vin & Sprit AB), founded in 1917, is an international producer and distributor of alcoholic beverages. The group is currently owned by Pernod Ricard. Headquartered in Stockholm, the capital of Sweden, the group employs approximately 2,500 people.

The company was founded by the Swedish government in 1917 to control the production, import, and distribution of stronger alcoholic beverages (excluding beer). Until 1994, the group had the position of a national alcohol monopoly for production and distribution, but this was abolished when Sweden joined the European Union in 1995. However, the Swedish alcohol retailing monopoly, operated by Systembolaget, is still in force. On March 31, 2008 it was announced that the Swedish government intended to sell V & S Group to Pernod Ricard for 5.626 billion euro, corresponding to 55 billion Swedish kronor. The deal was approved and finalized on July 24, 2008 at an estimated value of 5.69 billion euro.

The abbreviation V&S comes from the name Vin & Sprit, literally meaning "Wine & Liquor."

== History ==
AB Vin & Spritcentralen was created in 1917 by the Swedish government. The goal was to eliminate the private profit interest in the alcohol industry. In 1920, AB Vin & Spritcentralen bought the largest porter brewery in Sweden, Carnegie; the company was sold in 1928.

== Organization and brands ==
V&S Group is divided into three main areas:

- V&S Absolute Spirits handles Absolut Vodka and the other international spirits brands, such as Level Vodka, Frïs Vodka.
- V&S Distillers handles spirits on the Northern and Central European markets.
- V&S Wine handles wines and fortified wines in the Nordic region.

== Production and distribution ==
The production of the group's international spirits takes place in Sweden, Denmark, Great Britain, and St. Croix, U.S. Virgin Islands. Production of their local and regional spirits takes place primarily in Sweden, Denmark, Finland, Germany, and Poland. In Northern Europe, V&S Group is the largest importer and distributor of wine. The group offers their own brands of wine and also produces brands by well-known international companies.

Distribution in the Nordic area is primarily handled through the group's distribution centers in Sweden, Denmark, and Finland. V&S Group is represented by the subsidiary V&S Norway in Norway, by V&S Eesti in Estonia, and by the company V&S Luksusowa Zielona Góra in Poland. In the United States, distribution was handled by Future Brands, LLC, a joint-venture with Fortune Brands. In most other regions of the world, distribution was handled by Maxxium, which was also partly owned by the group.

== Sales ==
About three-quarters of the group's sales come from spirits, whereas the remaining quarter comes from wine. Vodka is their largest selling spirit, in which Absolut holds the highest sales figures. Geographically, North America is the group's single biggest market, accounting for 43% of total sales in 2007. The Swedish market accounts for one-sixth of sales. As volume is concerned, the group sold 158.4 million liters of spirits and 83.7 million liters of wine, totaling 242.1 million liters of product.

== See also ==
- List of government enterprises of Sweden
