= Popov (vodka) =

American brand of vodka

Popov is a brand of vodka formerly produced by Diageo's North American subsidiary. It commands a significant marketshare among vodkas in the United States and competes in the low price market. In November 2018, Diageo sold Popov vodka and various other brands to the Sazerac Company for $550 million.
