= Master distiller =

Title used for a distilling expert or distillery leader

Master distiller is a title often used for a distilling expert or a key leader or owner at modern distilleries. The title doesn't have a fixed definition and can mean different things at different companies. Although the craft of distilling has existed for centuries throughout history, the term "master distiller" only dates back as far as the 1800s when it was first used to acknowledge the distilling expertise and knowledge a person gained after practicing and perfecting the craft of distilling for many years. In more recent usage, the term can have a much broader meaning and is sometimes used for owners and company leaders who run their companies but do not actively create the distilling recipes and processes used at their distilleries.

== History ==
The craft of fermenting and distilling beverages dates back centuries, but the actual term "master distiller" has not been around for nearly as long. The 1867 edition of The English Cyclopaedia (Arts and Sciences section) offers a clear definition of the original meaning of the term:

"He tests the specific gravity of all the liquids as often as he pleases; he requires that the numerous pipes shall be painted, some black, some red, some blue, and some white, in order that he may know which is for the conveyance of wort, which for wash, which for the first spirit, and which for the finished spirit; he demands the aid of ladders and passages to give him access to every part of every piece of apparatus. In short, the master distiller is so thoroughly controlled in all the operations, that nothing but the prospect of large profits, arising out of a large business, would induce a manufacturer to wear such shackles."

— Charles Knight, The English Cyclopaedia, page 565

Originally, master distiller was a term most commonly used in relation to bourbon whiskey, both before and after Prohibition in the U.S., and its historical usage was typically limited to only those who had truly mastered the craft of distilling. In particular, Kentucky bourbon makers often had a hierarchy that consisted of distiller, head distiller, and master distiller.

== Common responsibilities ==
Although the level of scientific involvement may vary, master distillers usually supervise the production of the spirits made at their distilleries and are responsible for the final products and their quality. It was once common for master distillers to simply learn through years of hands-on experience, often as apprentices, but now many distillers – even those not labeled as master distillers – have related academic backgrounds with degrees in chemistry, biology, microbiology, food science, or actual distilling.

At the very least, those with master distiller titles typically have some type of related experience and the skills necessary to manage staff and supervise food safety throughout the distilling process. They also frequently possess the public relations skills needed to communicate with the public and the press.

A master distiller's exact responsibilities will vary, depending on the company, but common job duties include:

=== Product development ===
A modern master distiller who fits the traditional definition and actively participates in the production of existing spirits and the creation of new ones often has a background in chemistry and yeast physiology combined with years of distilling experience. However, some learn to master their craft without a formal education or training, instead learning from mentors who train them on the job. Regardless of the method, they learn how to take raw base ingredients, such as various grains for different types of whiskey or sugar cane for rum, and create fermented washes designed to produce spirits with very specific desired characteristics.

The spirit produced at different points in the distillation process varies in quality and has different characteristics. Making "cuts" to the distilled spirit to separate the heads (foreshots), hearts, and tails (feints) is an important part of the process that is often supervised by master distillers. They also choose the type of container for aging, such as wooden casks, and make decisions about blending, filtration, coloring, and bottling.

Even when master distillers entrust recipe-based decisions on malting, fermentation, maturation, and blending to other experts on their teams, they are generally responsible for the quality of the final product. They usually source the raw materials themselves and work with tasters on quality control to ensure consistent quality and flavor across all batches. They also have to ensure the distillery maintains the proper facilities and equipment for long-term storage for products that require aging.

=== Marketing ===
Master distillers often participate in the development of marketing campaigns and financing initiatives for new and existing products. With a goal of maximizing the value of the spirits produced by the distillery, they often incorporate the opinions of marketing teams and tasters into the product development phases.

Additionally, master distillers often serve as the "face" of the distillery, meaning they are usually the recognizable person who interacts with the public and the press at tastings, product launch events, trade shows, and other key events. They work with everyone from customers to wholesalers and sometimes even other distilleries to promote products and gain a loyal following of satisfied customers.

=== Management ===
In addition to managing staff, master distillers are often responsible for managing the day-to-day operations of the distillery, including handling finances and organizing distribution systems. They may have varying levels of involvement in the distilling process but usually at least manage the distilling team and plan staff training and development for a range of duties, including distillery functions like mashing and fermenting and administrative functions like accounting. Ensuring the team meets food safety standards at all times is also a key responsibility.

=== Administrative ===
On an administrative level, master distillers are sometimes in charge of regulatory paperwork to ensure all spirits remain in compliance with government rules and standards. The information that is monitored includes details about raw ingredients, equipment, and final product specifications. Master distillers either record each phase of the distillation process themselves or assign this duty to someone else. Detailed records are necessary to ensure the right procedures are followed to create products that meet all the quality and food safety guidelines.

== Pop Culture ==
In 2019 Discovery Channel (owned by Warner Brothers) debuted a reality based competition show called Moonshiners: Master Distillers. The show is currently in its 5th season in 2023.

== Training ==
Various schools and institutes offer programs to teach distilling. Additionally, some distilleries offer educational programs, often combined with on-the-job training.

== Notable people ==
Jeff Arnett is the seventh Master Distiller in the history of the Jack Daniel Distillery, having served in the position since 2008. He was honored by Whisky Magazine as "Master Distiller of the Year" in 2017.

Don Facundo Bacardi Masso – Spanish by birth, the namesake of Bacardi rum emigrated to Cuba and opened a general store with his brothers in the early 1800s. In 1862, Bacardi purchased a small distillery and worked with Jose Leon Boutellier to create the charcoal mellowing distilling technique used to make the world's first white rum.

James B. Beam – The Beam family has been distilling bourbon in Kentucky for more than two centuries. James Beauregard Beam, the namesake of the Jim Beam brand, revived the company after Prohibition.

Joseph L. Beam – Another member of the Kentucky Beam family, Joseph was the original master distiller at Heaven Hill Distillery, the company he founded with Ed Shapira after Prohibition ended. Many of the company's brands are named after notable local distillers, including Evan Williams, Elijah Craig, and J.W. Dant.

John Brannick – The co-founder and master distiller of Dublin Whiskey Distillery Company for many years beginning in 1872, Brannick produced D.W.D. Whisky for the company before leaving in 1887 to reopen Banagher Distillery.

Vanessa Braxton – Declared the first female African-American master distiller and blender of a nationally distributed vodka within the United States by the New York Legislature. Today, Braxton owns and operates Black Momma Vodka, which she founded in 2013.

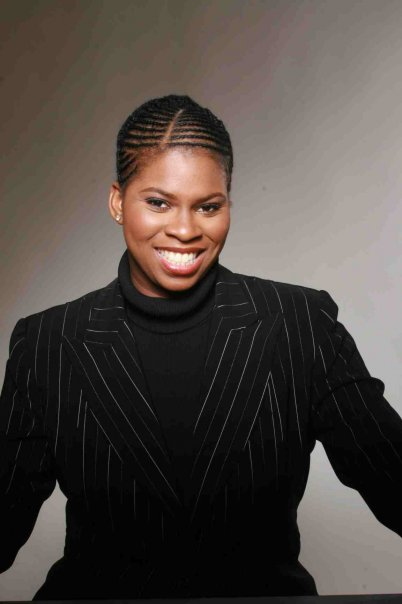
Portrait of Vanessa Braxton, first female African-American master distiller and blender.

Elijah Craig – Craig was a Baptist minister in an eastern Kentucky county that was originally part of Virginia. Also a whiskey distiller, he is labeled the "Father of Bourbon" by maker Heaven Hill Distillery, who adds that note to most of its Elijah Craig labels.

Don Jose Antonio de Cuervo – The namesake of Jose Cuervo tequila received the land grant for growing blue agave plants from the king of Spain in 1758. Jose Cuervo celebrated its 250th birthday in 2009.

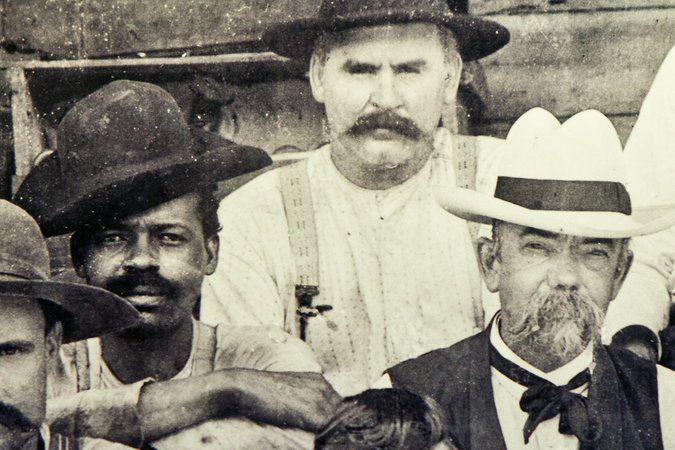
Jack Daniel, wearing the white hat, is believed to be sitting next to Nathan "Nearest" Green. There are no confirmed pictures of Green, but it is theorized that this picture is of him or possibly one of his sons.

Jack Daniel – After learning the craft of distilling from Nearest Green, Daniel went on to establish his own distillery with Green by his side. Today, the top-selling Jack Daniel's Old No. 7 whiskey is one of several whiskeys bearing the Jack Daniel name.

J.W. Dant – 1830s bourbon distiller J.W. Dant used hollowed out logs instead of copper pot stills to distill bourbon. Today, J.W. Dant is a rye-based bourbon with an inexpensive price point.

Marianne Barnes Eaves – Formerly the master distiller at Castle & Key Distillery in Frankfort, Kentucky, in 2016, Eaves became the first female bourbon master distiller in the state since before Prohibition.

William Grant – The Scottish founder of William Grant & Sons – the parent company of Glenfiddich Scotch whisky – built the original distillery by hand in 1886 with the help of five of his nine children.

Nathan "Nearest" Green – The actual first master distiller of Jack Daniel's whiskey went unacknowledged for more than a century, but Brown-Forman – the owner of Jack Daniel's – officially recognized Green, an African American former slave, as the mentor of a young Jack Daniel in May 2017. Two new whiskeys named after Green – Uncle Nearest 1856 aged whiskey and Uncle Nearest 1856 silver whiskey – were released the same year.

John Jameson – Scottish by birth, Jameson took over management of the Bow Street Distillery in Dublin after marrying Margaret Haig, a cousin of the owners. Jameson Irish Whiskey was created at the distillery under his tutelage.

Elmer T. Lee was a master distiller at Buffalo Trace Distillery famous for launching Blanton's, the first modern bourbon brand marketed as a single barrel bourbon.

Colonel James E. Pepper – Pepper was known for his flamboyance and bold claims about his family's whiskey, Old Pepper. He also claimed his family's distillery was the largest in the world and the oldest in the United States

Benjamin Prichard – Prichard originally distilled whiskey in the early 1800s in Davidson County, Tennessee. In 1997, his descendant, Phil Prichard, rejuvenated the family's distilling business in Kelso, Tennessee. Today, Prichard's distills rums and liqueurs in addition to Tennessee whiskeys.

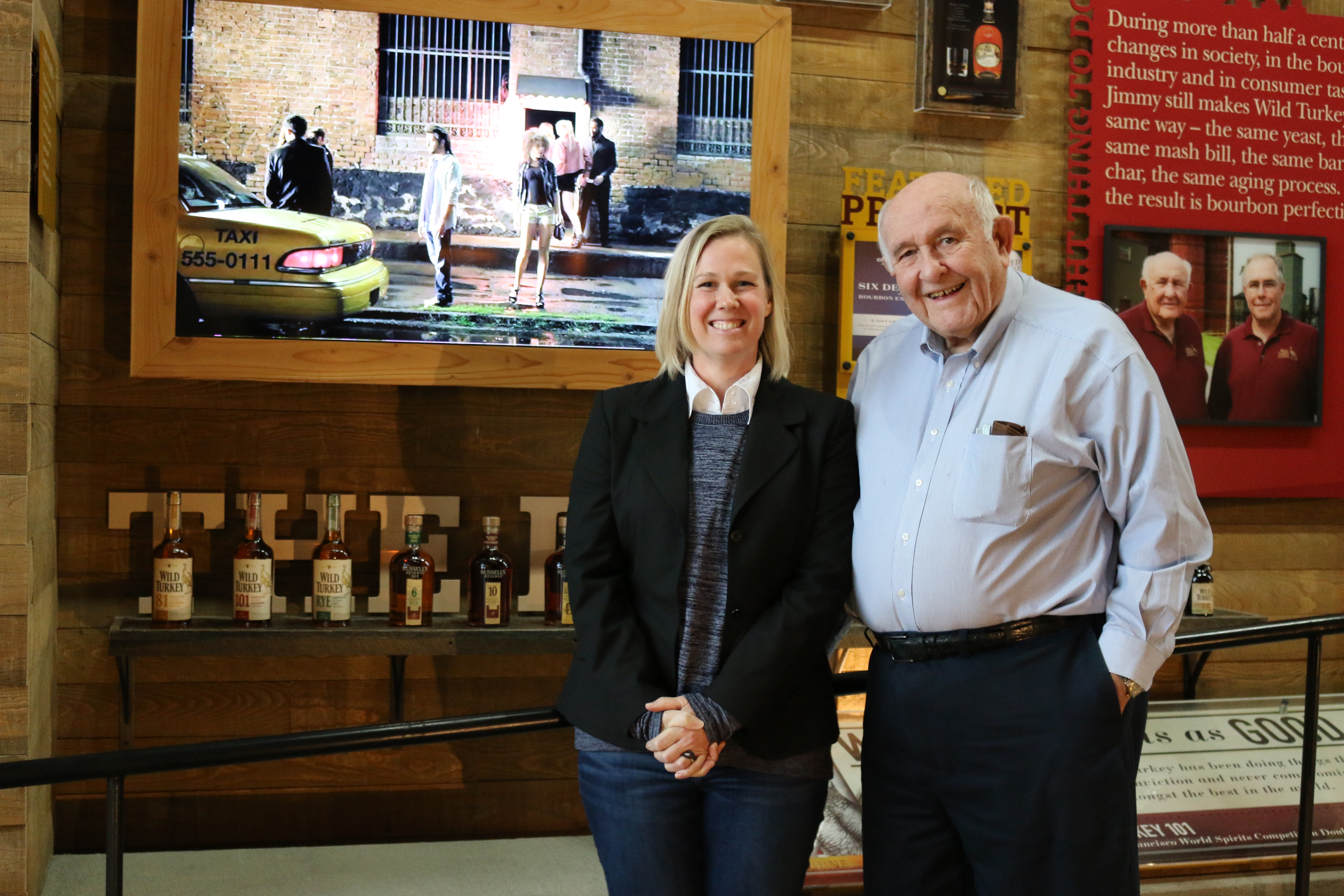
Jimmy Russel, master distiller at the Wild Turkey distillery in Kentucky, standing next to Jenny Murphy, a consumer safety officer in FDA's Center for Veterinary Medicine, after touring Russel's distillery.

Jimmy Russell – As master distiller at Wild Turkey, Russel has decades of hands-on distilling experience. His son, Eddie Russell, also became a master distiller for the company in 2015.

Jim Rutledge — Master distiller for over 20 years at Four Roses.

Don Cenobio Sauza – Often referred to as the "Father of Tequila", Sauza experimented with different varieties of plants before settling on mezcal azul as the one that produced the best flavor. This ultimately led to the exclusive use of this type of agave plant to make tequila.

Charles Tanqueray – Tanqueray established his London gin distillery in the Bloomsberg area in 1830. As of 2016, the United States was the largest market for Tanqueray gin.

Evan Williams – A Welsh immigrant and the first wharf master of Louisville, Kentucky, Williams started distilling in the late 1700s in Kentucky. The black label Evan Williams bottle claims he was Kentucky's first distiller in 1783.
