= McAfee's Benchmark =

Brand of Kentucky Straight Bourbon Whiskey

- Type: Bourbon whiskey
- Manufacturer: Sazerac Company
- Origin: Kentucky, United States
- Alcohol by volume: 40.00%
- Proof (US): 80
- Related products: Buffalo Trace

McAfee's Benchmark is a brand of Kentucky Straight Bourbon Whiskey produced by the Sazerac Company at its Buffalo Trace Distillery in Frankfort, Kentucky. The full name of the brand that appears on the bottle is "McAfee's Benchmark Old No. 8 Brand" (with "Benchmark" rendered in much larger letters than the rest). The primary brand expression is an 80 U.S. proof (40% alcohol by volume) bourbon aged "at least 36 months" according to its label.

Three whiskey-based liqueurs of 70 U.S. proof (35% alcohol by volume) also carry the brand name – one with apple flavoring, one with peach flavoring and the third with brown sugar flavoring.

== History ==
The Benchmark brand was created by Seagram's in the late 1960s to be a luxury or premium-level bourbon. At that time, the whiskey was not called McAfee's, but simply Benchmark Bourbon; and the name McAfee came much later. Originally Benchmark was sold in a decanter-style bottle with a black label.

The Benchmark brand name was purchased by the Sazerac Company in 1989 from Seagram's. It is still owned by Sazerac Brands of New Orleans which also now owns the Buffalo Trace distillery in Frankfort, where Benchmark is now made. The origin of the McAfee name is that James, George and Robert McAfee (along with James McCoun, Samuel Adams and Hancock Taylor) were, in 1773, the first early American explorers to survey land at the site where Buffalo Trace stands today. The original Benchmark was made at Lawrenceburg, Kentucky at the Old Prentice Distillery, now known as Four Roses Distillery (on the Salt River, fittingly located 5 miles north of McAfee, Ky) when Seagram owned it.
