= Bittermens =

Logo of Bittermens

Bittermens is an American producer of cocktail bitters and flavoring extracts.

The history of Bittermens dates back to 2007 when Avery and Janet Glasser, while living in San Francisco, were invited to a bitters-making event at the 209 Distillery. After receiving positive feedback from bartenders in San Francisco, New York and Boston, the Glassers started the process of registering as a Manufacturer of Nonbeverage (Alcohol) Products with the Bureau of Alcohol and Tobacco Tax and Trade Bureau. In 2010, after obtaining all of the necessary federal and state permits, Bittermens started production in a shared commercial kitchen in Somerville, MA. In 2011, Bittermens relocated to Brooklyn, NY. In 2013, Bittermens moved their operations down to Greater New Orleans, LA. In 2016, Bittermens relocated to Portland, Oregon.

As of January, 2013, Bittermens currently produces over 5000 bottles each month in the following flavors:

- Xocolatl Mole Bitters - The original chocolate and spice bitters (2007)
- Hopped Grapefruit Bitters (2007)
- 'Elemakule Tiki Bitters - Allspice, Cinnamon, Clove and Citrus (2008)
- Boston Bittahs - Citrus and Chamomile (2008)
- Burlesque Bitters - Açai, Rosehips, Hibiscus and Long Pepper (2011)
- Orange Cream Citrate - Orange and Vanilla (2011)
- Orchard Street Celery Shrub - Celery, Ginger and Apple Cider Vinegar (2011)
- Hellfire Habanero Shrub - Habanero Pepper, Elderberries and Red Wine Vinegar (2011)

In 2011, Bittermens formed a new company, Bittermens Spirits, Inc. to launch a line of domestically produced bitter liqueurs. Later in 2012, Bittermens created and launched Bäska Snaps, a traditional Swedish-style bitter schnapps made with distilled wormwood, which started their foray into producing New Nordic Spirits. In 2015, Bittermens branched out into syrups with its new Speed Craft Syrups line, and in 2016, Bittermens launched its first six new bitters since 2011.

On March 3, 2017, Sazerac Company announced that it had purchased a "significant interest" in Bittermens.
