= B.L. Agro Industries =

Indian food manufacturer

B. L. Agro Industries
- Formation: 1950
- Founder: Dr. Ghanshyam Khandelwal
- Founded at: Bareilly
- Type: Private
- Headquarters: Parsa Khera, Bareilly, U.P.
- Location: India
- Products: Bail Kolhu Oil, Nourish Store
- Owner: Ghanshyam Khandelwal
- Key people: Ghanshyam Khandelwal, Ashish Khandelwal
- Revenue: ₹4,500 crore
- Website: blagro.org
- Formerly called: B.L. Agro Oils Pvt. Ltd

BL Agro Industries is an edible oil and food manufacturing company headquartered in Bareilly. Started around the 1950s as an oil trading business, the registered foundation of the organization was laid around the 1970s by Dr. Ghanshyam Khandelwal and joined by his son Ashish Khandelwal in the late 90s. As a commodity trading business, the fast-moving consumer goods firm owns brands like Bail Kolhu, a more than 50-year-old edible oil brand, and Nourish, a food brand that sells products in the staple food category, such as wheat flour, spices, and pulses. The company's turnover stood at Rs 2,173 crore last fiscal year and has over 58,000 direct retailers onboard across 200 Indian cities.

In addition, the company has also announced a marketing investment of ₹150 crore in FY 2021–22 to drive growth and expansion.

In FY 2025-26, BL Agro Plans to Achieve Rs 5,500 crore Turnover. The company plans to take its Nourish Exclusive Brand Outlets count to 100 by next year, from the current 15.

== CSR Initiatives ==
BL Agro has manufacturing units in the Bareilly district of Uttar Pradesh, which operate on 100% solar power to curb the carbon emissions from the manufacturing plant.

The company is also the first to install air purifiers across its manufacturing units to reduce carbon emissions and improve the air quality of the Parsakhera Industrial Area in Bareilly.

In addition, to create a clean and green environment, the company began the plantation drive in 2015 and, to date, has planted more than 15,000 saplings in the city.

BL Agro has also initiated the nutrition kit distribution campaign under the Poshan Month initiative by the Hon’ble PM Modi. Under this nutrition drive, the company distributes 100 kits every month to the less privileged people in the Bareilly district.

In the second wave of the COVID-19 pandemic, the company carried out a vaccination drive for all its employees and their families based at its corporate office in Bareilly, making the campus and factory area 100% vaccinated. The Serum Institute’s COVISHIELD and Bharat Biotech’s COVAXIN were used for vaccinating BL Agro’s employees and their families.

In May 2022, the edible oil and food manufacturing company organised a medical camp at its corporate office in Bareilly. The Employee State Insurance Corporation (ESIC), a central and state government corporation, conducted this camp under the UP government’s medical check-up initiative.

In the camp, employees of BL Agro underwent medical check-ups and medicines were distributed to them.

In November 2022, BL Agro, has also been granted naming rights of New Delhi Railway Station platforms 14, 15 and 16 allowing for panels, billboards, vinyl wrapping, and more.
