= William Goldring (businessman) =

American businessman

- Born: William A. Goldring; 1942 or 1943 (age 82–83)
- Education: Tulane University
- Title: Chairman, Sazerac Company
- Spouse: Jane Goldring
- Children: 3
- Parent(s): Stephen Goldring; Mathilde "Teal" Goldring

William A. Goldring (born 1942/1943) is an American billionaire businessman, chairman of the Sazerac Company, a diverse spirits company in the US, and head of the family that owns the company.

== Early life ==
He is the son of Stephen Goldring and Mathilde "Teal" Goldring. He was brought up in New Orleans and earned a bachelor's degree in business from Tulane University.

== Career ==
Goldring is chairman of the Sazerac Company, one of the largest liquor distillers in the US and of Crescent Crown Distributing, the second-largest beer wholesaler in the US.

Sazerac's brands include Buffalo Trace Bourbon, Wheatley Vodka, Sazerac Rye, Stagg Bourbon, Pappy Van Winkle Bourbon, Weller Bourbon, 1792 Bourbon, Southern Comfort, Blanton's, Canadian Mist, Corazon Tequila, Fireball Cinnamon Whiskey, Goldschlager, Margaritaville Tequila, Myers's Rum, Parrot Bay, Paul Masson Brandy, Platinum 10x Vodka, Romana Sambuca, BuzzBallz, Svedka Vodka, and Seagram's VO.

== Personal life ==
Goldring has three children, Jeffrey Goldring, who works for Sazerac, as well as Diane Franco and Marc Goldring.

Goldring is a member of the board of Tulane University and on the board of trustees of The National WWII Museum, New Orleans. He is also Jewish.

== Honors ==
In 2011, Goldring was awarded The Times-Picayune Loving Cup, awarded annually since 1901 for philanthropy in the New Orleans area.

In 2012, The New Orleans Wine and Food Experience presented Goldring with the Ella Brennan Lifetime Achievement Award for his philanthropy.
