= John Distilleries =

Indian company that produces distilled beverages

John Distilleries Pvt Ltd
- Company type: Privately held company
- Industry: Alcoholic Beverage
- Founded: Bangalore, Karnataka, India (1992)
- Founder: Paul P. John
- Headquarters: Bangalore, Karnataka, India
- Number of locations: 16 manufacturing units in 12 states
- Area served: India, United States, UK, EUROPE, ASIA, Africa, UAE,
- Key people: Paul P. John (chairman and MD); Sridhar Pongur (Joint MD and COO); R. Srinivasan (CFO)
- Revenue: ▲₹9.2 billion (US$96 million) (2012); ₹8.55 billion (US$89 million) (2011)
- Operating income: ▲₹4.79 billion (US$50 million) (2012); ₹4.43 billion (US$46 million) (2011)
- Total assets: ▲₹2.99 billion (US$31 million) (2012); ₹2.83 billion (US$30 million) (2011)
- Total equity: ▲₹867 million (US$9.0 million) (2012); ₹791 million (US$8.3 million) (2011)
- Number of employees: 2000
- Parent: Paul John Enterprises
- Website: www.jdl.in

John Distilleries Pvt Ltd is an Indian company that produces distilled beverages, and the company's flagship brand is Original Choice whisky. It also manufactures brandy, whisky, wines, and the award winning single malt whisky called Paul John. The founders have sold 51% of the company to Sazerac Company.

== History ==
John Distilleries was founded by Paul P. John, originally from Kerala and the son of a plantation and liquor baron in Karnataka. He also has interests in hospitality. The company's first distillery was set up in Bangalore, Karnataka. The company launched Original Choice whisky in 1996. The brand was an instant success, taking John Distilleries to the top of the segment of the Indian whisky market. The company decided to take the brand national, and signed Malayalam film actor Mohanlal as surrogate brand ambassador.

John Distilleries sold four million cases in 2005. Original Choice was the largest selling IMFL brand in Karnataka that year, selling nearly two lakh cases a month with John Distilleries' overall IMFL sales by volume in the state amounting to around 1.2 million cases. Original Choice sold about 4.5 million cases in 2006, and 6.41-million cases in 2007.

John Distilleries launched the Big Banyan wines in 2007. Big Banyan Wines is named after the Big Banyan Tree near Bangalore, where the corporate headquarters of John Distilleries is located. The chief wine maker is oenologist Lucio Matricardi, who is a consultant at wineries in Italy. Big Banyan initially launched five varietals. John Distilleries officially launched two new variants under its Big Banyan brand on 7 July 2010 at The Paul, Bangalore, a business hotel owned by Paul John. The new variants were Rosa Rossa, a rose wine, and Bellissima Late Harvest Muscat, a dessert wine. Bellissima is the Italian word for beautiful. Bellissima is the first dessert wine in India to be made from the Muscat grape.

John Distilleries acquired Chitali Distilleries Limited (CDL) in August 2008 for ₹288 million (US$3.0 million). It was John Distilleries first acquisition outside South India, and enabled it to produce rectified spirit and extra neutral alcohol. The company was merged with JDL on 1 October 2010. Chitali Distilleries had previously been fully owned by the Government of Maharashtra and is located in Shrirampur in Ahmadnagar district.

John Distilleries established itself in South India, retailing in Karnataka, Kerala, Goa, Puducherry and Andhra Pradesh. In early 2009, it began retailing in Punjab, Haryana, Himachal Pradesh, Chandigarh, Rajasthan, Jharkhand, Bihar, Maharashtra and Chhattisgarh. John Distilleries launched a brand of French brandy called Mônt Castlé in December 2009. Mônt Castlé was available across Karnataka in frosted glass bottles of 750 ml, 375 ml, 180 ml and 90 ml. The brand later expanded to other states. Its main competition is Mumbai-based Tilaknagar Industries' flagship Mansion House brandy.

John Distilleries sold 12.5 million cases in 2009. On 1 October 2010, The company launched Roulette brandy in 2012.

The company has always been making blended whisky, but decided to manufacture single malt whisky in 2008 in an attempt to enter the premium segment of the market. John Distilleries chose to use Indian ingredients to give the whisky characteristics of its country of origin. The first bottling of Paul John whisky, branded "Paul John Single Cask 161 Whisky", was officially launched in London, UK, on 4 October 2012 by Sanjay Paul, CEO of Alcobev Limited, at the Capital Hotel in Knightsbridge, London, England. The brand's second release, "Paul John Single Cask 163 Whisky" was also released by Sanjay Paul, CEO of Alcobev Limited, having 57% abv and priced at £60. Following the single cask release, Sanjay Paul, CEO of Alcobev Limited released Paul John's flagship single malt whiskies in May 2013. They were branded Paul John Brilliance, Paul John Edited and Paul John Bold. These expressions range from unpeated to peated and are available across 38 countries in the world today. With over 200 known international awards, the range of expressions also include Select Cask Classic and Select Cask Peated.

== Brands ==
John Distilleries manufactures brandy, whisky, wines, and single malt whisky. Original Choice whisky contributed almost 90% of JDL's overall sales in 2010. The company currently manufactures the following brands:

Whisky

- Original Choice
- Grand Duke
- Paul John

Brandy

- Mônt Castlé
- Roulette

Wines

- Ampersand
- Big Banyan
- Goana's Wine

Gin

- Malhar (Indian craft)

== Production and Distribution ==
John Distilleries has a network of 12 manufacturing units across 8 States and the union territory of Puducherry. The company's primary distillery, a malt plant, is located in Goa. It also has a winery in Maharashtra. The company also owns some blending and bottling units that manufacture IMFL. Many of these units are leased by John Distilleries. As on 30 June 2012, the total installed capacity for IMFL (including leased capacity) was 17.2 million cases annually (14.7 million cases per annum in respect of owned units) and for malt spirit was 0.9 million cases p.a. There is one unit in each of the locations listed below, unless otherwise specified:

- Andhra Pradesh
- Raipur, Chhattisgarh
- Cuncolim, Goa
- Haryana
- Himachal Pradesh
- Kerala
- Bidar, Karnataka
- Davangere, Karnataka
- Kunigal, Karnataka
- Chitali, Maharashtra
- Pondicherry, Puducherry
- Punjab (two units)
- Tamil Nadu

John Distilleries currently sells its products in ten States and four union territories (UTs) of India, besides exports to Africa, the United Arab Emirates and the United Kingdom. The States/UTs it currently retails in are listed below:

- Andaman and Nicobar Islands
- Andhra Pradesh
- Bihar
- Chandigarh
- Chhattisgarh
- Delhi
- Goa
- Haryana
- Himachal Pradesh
- Karnataka
- Kerala
- Pondicherry
- Punjab
- Tamil Nadu
