= Amrut Distilleries =

Indian company that produces distilled beverages

Amrut Distilleries Ltd
- Type: Privately held company
- Industry: Alcoholic beverages
- Founded: 1948; 78 years ago in Bangalore, Karnataka, India
- Founder: J.N. Radhakrishna Rao Jagdale
- Headquarters: Rajajinagar, Bangalore, Karnataka, India
- Area served: Worldwide
- Key people: Neelakanta Jagdale (Chairman and MD); Surrinder Kumar (VP, Production)
- Website: www.amrutdistilleries.com

Amrut Distilleries Ltd is an Indian company that produces distilled beverages. It is best known for its eponymous Amrut brand of single malt whisky, which is the first single malt whisky to be made in India. The brand became famous after world famous whisky connoisseur Jim Murray gave it a rating of 82 out of 100 in 2005 and 2010. In 2010, Murray named Amrut Fusion single malt whisky as the third best in the world. John Hansell, editor of American magazine Whisky Advocate, wrote that "India's Amrut distillery changed the way many think of Indian whisky - that it was, in the past, just cheap Scotch whisky blended with who knows what and sold as Indian whisky. Amrut is making whisky, and it's very good". In 2019, Amrut Fusion Single Malt Whiskey was awarded the "World Whiskey of the Year Award" and Amrut Distilleries was awarded "Word Whiskey Producer of the Year" at the 2019 Bartender Spirits Awards in San Francisco.

Despite the fame the company has received for the single malt whisky, it accounted for only 4-5% of the company's revenue in 2011–12. The bulk of its revenue comes from the sales of brandy, rum, vodka, gin and blended whisky, particularly the Silver Oak brandy, Old Port rum and Prestige whisky brands. Approximately 20% of its revenue comes from supplying the Canteen Stores Department. Amrut Distilleries currently sells Amrut single malt whisky in 23 countries, including Australia, Belgium, Canada, Denmark, Finland, France, Germany, Italy, Japan, the Netherlands, Norway, Singapore, Spain, South Africa, Sweden, Switzerland, Taiwan, the United Kingdom and the United States.

== History ==
Founder JN Radhakrishna Rao Jagdale established a company called Amrut Laboratories in Bangalore, Karnataka in 1947, with an initial investment of a few hundred thousand rupees. Amrut is a Sanskrit word which can be translated as "nectar of the gods", "nectar of life", or "drink of the gods". The company translates it as "Elixir of Life". Following the liberalization of alcohol licensing laws, distillery licenses were easier to obtain. Jagdale took the opportunity to enter the liquor market by founding Amrut Distilleries Ltd in 1948. Today, Amrut Distilleries Ltd operates as a subsidiary of the N.R. Jagdale Group, an Indian industrial group, based in the city of Bangalore. The first plant was a liquor blending and bottling unit, specializing in Indian Made Foreign Liquor (IMFL). The current main distillery was built in 1987. It is located on a 4-acre (1.6 ha) site in Kambipura on Mysore Road, roughly 20 kilometres from Bangalore.

Amrut Distilleries launched its first brand called Silver Cup brandy in Karnataka in 1949. The company began supplying liquor to the Canteen Stores Department in 1962 and continues to supply some of its domestic brands to the military. Radhakrishna Jagdale's son, Neelakanta Rao Jagdale, joined the family business in 1972. The higher standard of living that was becoming more prevalent in the country led to a higher demand for good quality liquor. Radhakrishna died in 1976, and his son assumed the role of chairman and managing director of the company. The company faced difficulties until the 1990s, as good equipment was not available locally. According to Neelakanta Jagdale, "The alcoholic beverages industry was not a priority in the country. Although we received help to a certain extent from the Central Food Technological Research Institute (CFTRI), we had to find our own ways to learn about improved distilling methods".

In 1982, Jagdale had decided to create a premium whisky from barley blended with malt, while most distillers in India were manufacturing whisky using molasses. Amrut Distilleries began using locally grown barley, in addition to molasses, and launched Prestige Blended Malt Whisky in the Canteen Stores Department in 1986. The first batch of single malt whisky was ready within 18 months. Because India had no culture of consuming single malt at the time, the company did not consider bottling it as a single malt. Instead, the whisky was blended with alcohol distilled from sugarcane to produce MaQintosh Premium Whisky. Initially, Amrut aged malt whisky for around a year before blending it. However, due to changing customer preferences, less malt whisky was being added into blended variants. The company discovered that hot weather makes whisky mature faster in India than it does in Europe or the United States. The fraction lost to evaporation during ageing, known as the angels' share, is also higher in India, at 11–12% per year, than in Scotland, where the annual evaporative loss is about 2%. Surinder Kumar, the master blender at Amrut Distilleries, has estimated that one year of barrel-ageing in India is equal to three years of ageing in Scotland. Jagdale felt that "the taste profiles were much better, almost matching some of the 12-year-old [Scotch] whiskies". The company then decided to launch their whisky in the European market.

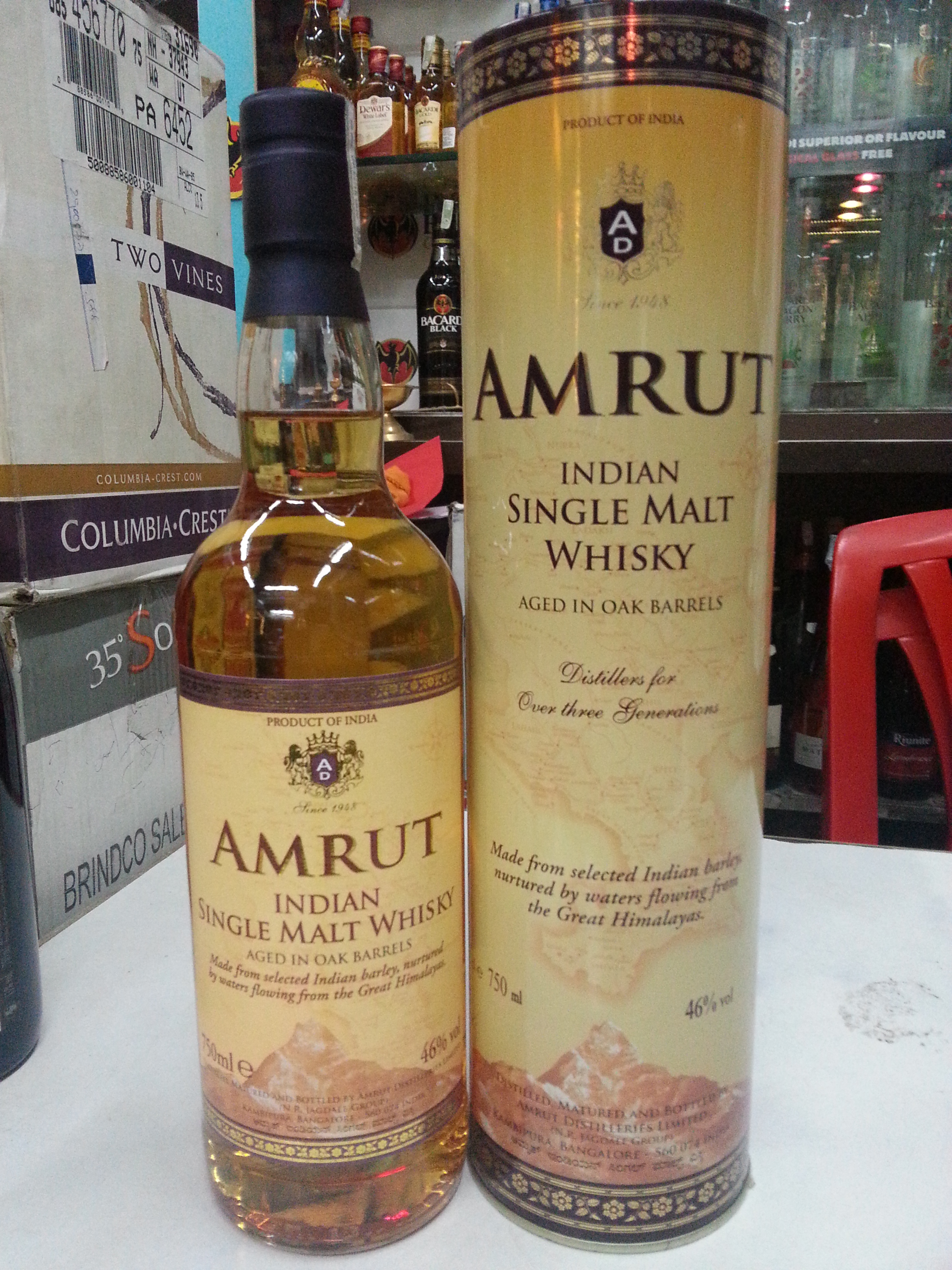
A bottle of Amrut Single Malt Whisky.

In 2001, Neelakanta Rao Jagdale asked his son Rakshit Jagdale, who was pursuing an MBA course in Newcastle, England at the time, to investigate the potential of exporting their products to that country. Consultants Tatlock and Thomson Ltd of Scotland were hired to help hone the company's processes at their Bangalore distillery. Amrut Distilleries conducted blind tests of their single malt whisky in Scotland, where most consumers said they liked the drink and compared it to Speyside single malts.

The whisky, under the brand name Amrut Single Malt Whisky, debuted in Europe on 24 August 2004. The company faced difficulties convincing European distributors and consumers to try the product, as most believed that a good single malt could not be produced in India. According to head of international operations Ashok Chokalingam, the initial strategy of offering the product in restaurants was dropped, as "the resources needed are too high, both financial and human". They switched their focus to retailers and bars. Following the UK launch, the brand spread across Western Europe and the Scandinavian countries within two years.

On 4 February 2010, Amrut Distilleries held a tasting session in Bangalore to launch their single malt whisky. The brand began retailing in Bangalore the same month. Domestically, it continued to be available only in Karnataka until November 2013 when it was launched in Mumbai. The company went with a Scottish launch for marketing reasons. According to Neelakanta Jagdale, "From a marketing perspective, we thought if our product had to pass the test, why not do so in the toughest location. Scotland is the home of Scotch. If they acknowledge our single malt, then that's good enough for me". The company also feels that "the high entry costs and complex excise laws in different states are a deterrent to further expansion in India". The brand was launched in North America in April 2010. Purple Valley Imports is its distributor in the United States.

== Production ==
Amrut Distilleries began with a single blending and bottling unit, specializing in IMFL. Amrut's current main distillery was built in 1987. It is located in Kambipura on Mysore Road, roughly 20 kilometres from Bangalore. In addition to the original distillery, company also has a re-distillation plant to produce extra neutral alcohol for captive consumption and a bottling unit in Kerala. The company decided against using computers and automation in their distillery in favour of providing more jobs to people. The Bangalore distillery employs 450 people. Its distillery operation is highly labour-intensive and bottles are manually packed. Most of the staff at Amrut Distilleries involved in bottling and packaging are women. The distillery produces 4 million cases of liquor a year, of which about 25% are blended whisky and around 0.25% are single malt. The barley for the malt is grown in the Punjab and Rajasthan regions, and transported about 2500 km (1600 miles) to the distillery.

Amrut Distilleries is headquartered in the Rajajinagar neighbourhood of Bangalore.

== Products ==
Amrut Distilleries manufactures whisky (blended and single malt), brandy, rum, vodka and gin.

Amrut Single Malt Whisky

- Amrut Indian Single Malt Whisky 46%
- Amrut Peated Indian Single Malt Whisky 46%
- Amrut Fusion Indian Single Malt Whisky 50%
- Amrut Cask Strength
- Amrut Peated Indian Single Malt Whisky Cask Strength
- Amrut Intermediate Sherry
- Amrut Two Continents Single Malt Whisky
- Amrut Portonova
- Amrut Kadambham
- Amrut Single Cask
- Amrut 100

Whisky

- MaQ Scotch
- MaQintosh
- Prestige Fine Whisky
- Prestige Blended Malt Whisky
- Prestige Rare Whisky

Brandy

- Bejois Blended Grape Brandy
- Bejois Premium Brandy
- Bejois VSOP Brandy
- Bejois Napoleon Brandy
- Silver Cup

Rum

- Old Port Deluxe Rum
- Old Port Deluxe Matured Rum
- Amrut XXX Classic Rum
- Amrut XXX Rum

Vodka

- Muscovy Vodka

Gin

- Blue Star Dry Gin

== See also ==
- Indian whisky
- Indian Made Foreign Liquor (IMFL)
