= Blanton's =

Brand of bourbon whiskey

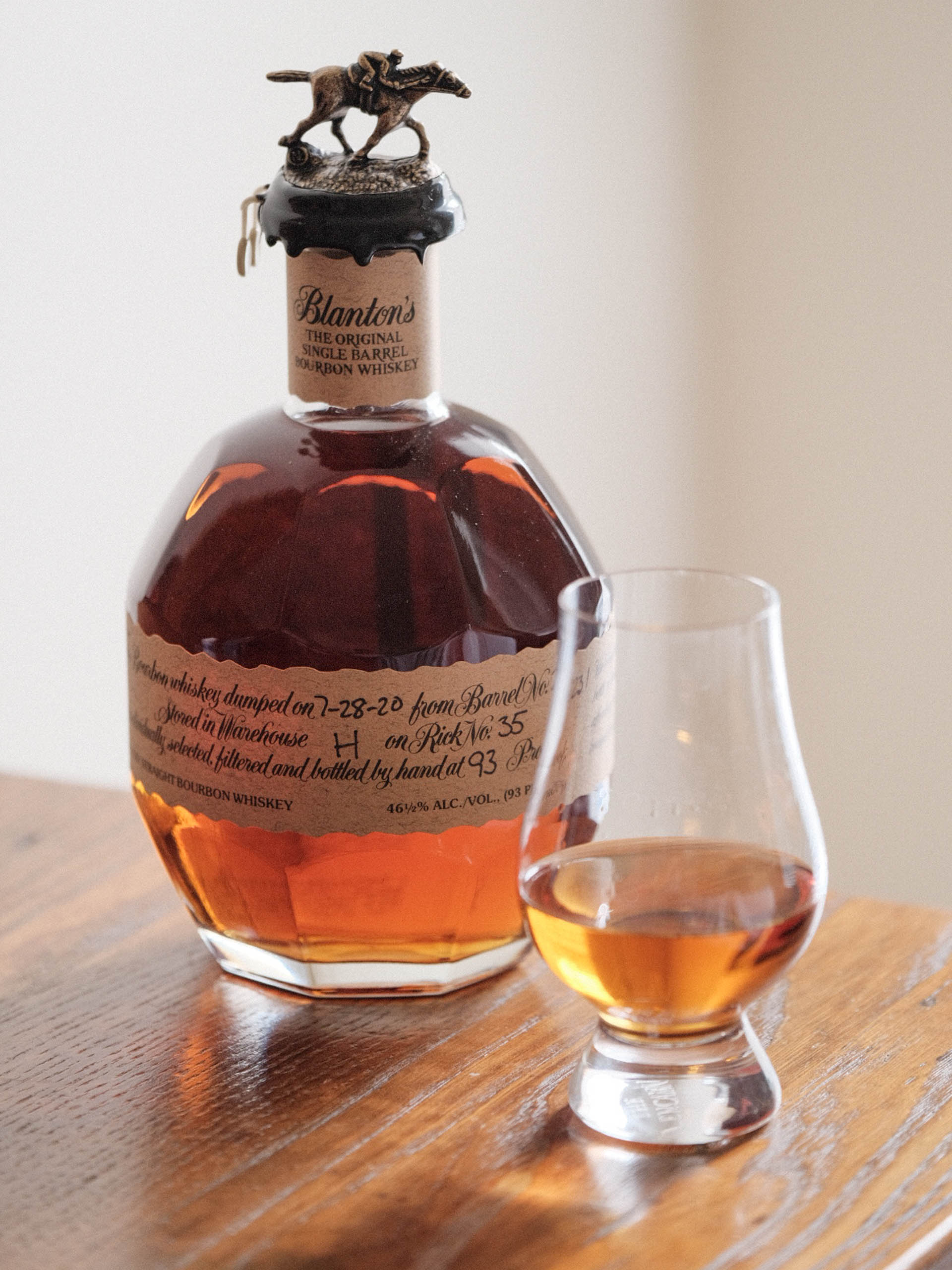
- Type: Bourbon whiskey
- Manufacturer: Sazerac Company
- Origin: Kentucky, United States
- Introduced: 1984
- Alcohol by volume: c. 46.50% (varies)
- Proof (US): 93 (Original), 80 (Special Reserve), 103 (Gold), Cask (Straight From the Barrel)
- Related products: Buffalo Trace

Blanton's is a brand of bourbon whiskey produced and marketed by the Sazerac Company. Though it does not own the brand, it has exclusive distilling rights. It is owned by Age International, Inc. It is distilled in Frankfort, Kentucky at the Buffalo Trace Distillery.

== History ==
The Blanton's brand was launched in 1984 under the guidance of the distillery's master distiller Elmer T. Lee, as the first modern bourbon brand marketed as a single barrel bourbon. The original brand name was "Blanton's Single Barrel Bourbon". A single barrel bourbon is one for which each bottling batch is produced from the contents of only one particular aging barrel – not mixed with whiskey from any other barrels (and not blended with neutral spirits, colorings, or flavorings). The company says that producing a high quality whiskey using this production method requires constant monitoring of every barrel in the middle of the warehouse by the Master Distiller. The barrels are dumped by hand without using machinery. There are eight different stopper designs, each with a different letter of the alphabet molded into it and topped with a figurine of a racehorse and jockey. When placed in order, spelling "B L A N T O N: S", the horse and jockey's poses display eight different scenes of a horse race, from standing at the gate, to crossing the finish line with a win.

Blanton's Single Barrel Bourbon is typically aged for 6 to 8 years. It is aged in Warehouse H at Buffalo Trace, which is the only metal-cladded warehouse at Buffalo Trace and was commissioned for construction by one of the distillery's early leaders, Albert B. Blanton, shortly after the end of the Prohibition era. Being metal, the warehouse transfers heat quicker than brick warehouses, which allows for more rapid aging.

There are multiple different expressions of Blanton's, each being a different proof. The original 93 proof Blanton's was the only expression available in the United States until 2020. That year, Sazerac Company announced domestic annual limited releases of 103 proof Blanton's Gold and cask proof Blanton's Straight From the Barrel. Prior to these announcements, both Gold and Straight From the Barrel were available exclusively in select international markets.

Other export-only expressions are available in select international markets, including 80 proof Green Label Special Reserve, and the Japanese market's 80 proof Black Label, 93 proof Takara Red and 103 proof Takara Gold, all of which are aged for an additional two years. From 2014 to 2018 a 'Poland Limited Edition' release was bottled for the M&P Wine and Spirits Festival in Raszyn, Poland. Since 2019, this has been marketed as a 'Special Release' available to select European markets and retailers. Moreover, an annual collaboration with Parisian Whisky retailer La Maison du Whisky has been released every year since 2006, with the inaugural bottling celebrating the 50th Anniversary of La Maison, presented at their Whisky Festival.

== Albert Blanton and the Buffalo Trace distillery ==
Blanton's bourbon was named in honor of one of the distillery's early leaders, Albert B. Blanton, who the company claims spent most of his life preserving the tradition of handcrafted bourbon. Blanton worked at the facility now known as the Buffalo Trace Distillery for approximately 55 years. He was born and raised on a farm just outside Frankfort, Kentucky, and he began working at the distillery (then called the O.F.C. Distillery or Old Fire Copper Distillery) in 1897 as an office boy when he was 16 years old. Over the next few years, he reportedly worked in every department, and in 1912 he was appointed superintendent of the distillery, its warehouse, and bottling shop – at the same time that the distillery was renamed to become the George T. Stagg Distillery. He became president of the whiskey plant in 1921. Blanton died in 1959.

The company refers to him as "Colonel Blanton", as he held the honorific title of Kentucky Colonel (a relatively common honorific bestowed by the Commonwealth of Kentucky). The distillery had several owners during its history, and was renamed by its current owner, the Sazerac Company, to become the Buffalo Trace Distillery in 2001.

Elmer T. Lee, the originator of Blanton's, was hired by the distillery by Blanton in 1949. He introduced the Blanton's brand in 1984, a year before he retired, as the first modern brand of bourbon marketed as single barrel bourbon. Lee continued to act as an ambassador for Buffalo Trace until his death in 2013.
