= Elmer T. Lee =

American distiller

Elmer Tandy Lee (Aug. 5, 1919 — July 16, 2013) was a master distiller at Buffalo Trace Distillery, and master distiller emeritus after his retirement in 1985.

== Biography ==
Lee was born in Peaks Mill, Kentucky in 1919.

Lee is known for launching Blanton's in 1984, the first modern bourbon brand marketed as a single barrel bourbon.

Eric Gregory, president of the Kentucky Distillers' Association, credited the premium market that Mr. Lee pioneered as a major factor in the bourbon industry's turnaround in the last decade; sales reached 30 million gallons in 2012 for the first time since 1973, he said.

He entered the University of Kentucky but withdrew to volunteer for the Army in World War II. He served as a radar bombardier in B-29 bombers based in Guam. Mr. Lee returned to the university after the war to get his degree and began working at the distillery as a maintenance engineer when, under a different owner, it was called the George T. Stagg Distillery. He was promoted to plant superintendent in 1966 and to plant manager in 1969 and given the title master distiller in the early 1980s.

After his retirement, Buffalo Trace honored Mr. Lee with a single-barrel brand of his own, the Elmer T. Lee Kentucky Straight Bourbon Whiskey, bottled from barrels he continued selecting himself into his 90s. The label won gold medals this year [2013] at both the Los Angeles International Wine and Spirits Competition and the San Francisco World Spirits Competition. The journal Whiskey Advocate described its flavor as "elegant and complex."

Lee was inducted in the Kentucky Bourbon Hall of Fame in 2001 and received lifetime achievement awards from both Whisky Advocate (2002) and Whisky Magazine (2012).

Lee died in Frankfort, Kentucky, in 2013, at the age of 93.
