= List of whisky brands =

This is a list of whisky brands arranged by country of origin and style. Whisky (or whiskey) is a type of distilled alcoholic beverage made from fermented grain mash. Different grains are used for different varieties, including barley, malted barley, rye, malted rye, wheat, and corn. Whisky is typically aged in wooden casks, made generally of charred white oak.

== American whiskey ==
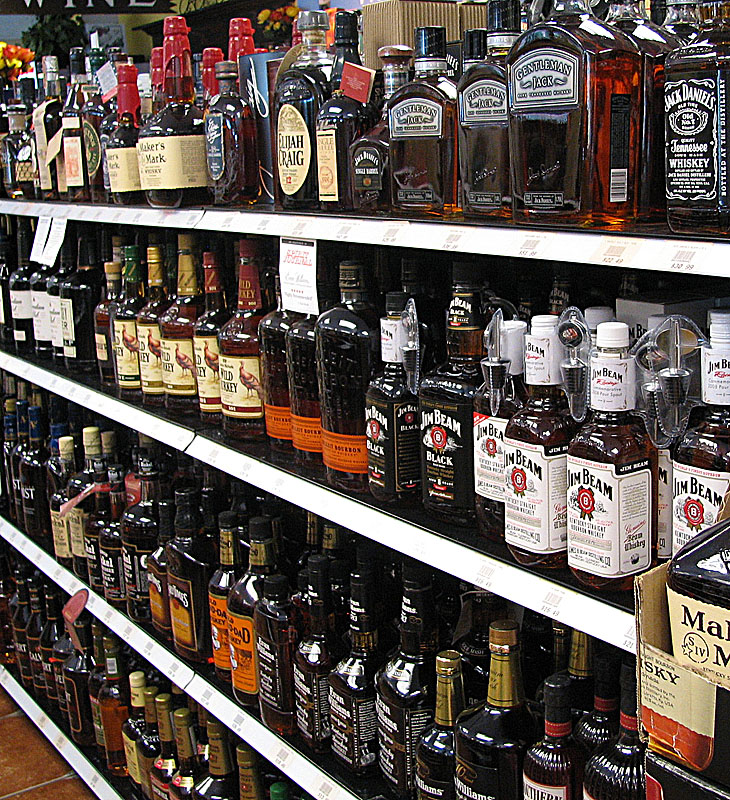
A selection of Bourbons and Tennessee whiskeys offered at a liquor store in Decatur, Georgia

Fourteen large distilleries owned by eight companies produce over 99% of the whiskey made in the U.S.

- Brown–Forman's Brown–Forman Distillery (Shively, Kentucky), Jack Daniel Distillery (Lynchburg, Tennessee), and Woodford Reserve Distillery (Versailles, Kentucky)
- Campari's Wild Turkey Distillery (Lawrenceburg, Kentucky)
- Diageo's Bulleit Distillery, (Shelbyville, Kentucky), George Dickel Distillery (Tullahoma, Tennessee)
- Heaven Hill's Bernheim Distillery (Louisville, Kentucky)
- Kirin's Four Roses Distillery (Lawrenceburg, Kentucky)
- MGP Ingredients' Ross & Squib Distillery (Lawrenceburg, Indiana)
- Sazerac's Barton 1792 Distillery (Bardstown, Kentucky) and Buffalo Trace Distillery (Frankfort, Kentucky)
- Suntory Global Spirits' Booker Noe Distillery (Boston, Kentucky), Jim Beam Distillery (Clermont, Kentucky), and Maker's Mark Distillery (Loretto, Kentucky)

Of the fourteen, eleven are in Kentucky, two are in Tennessee, and one is in Indiana. The three states are grouped together in the east-central mainland region of the United States.

=== Bourbon ===
==== Kentucky bourbon ====
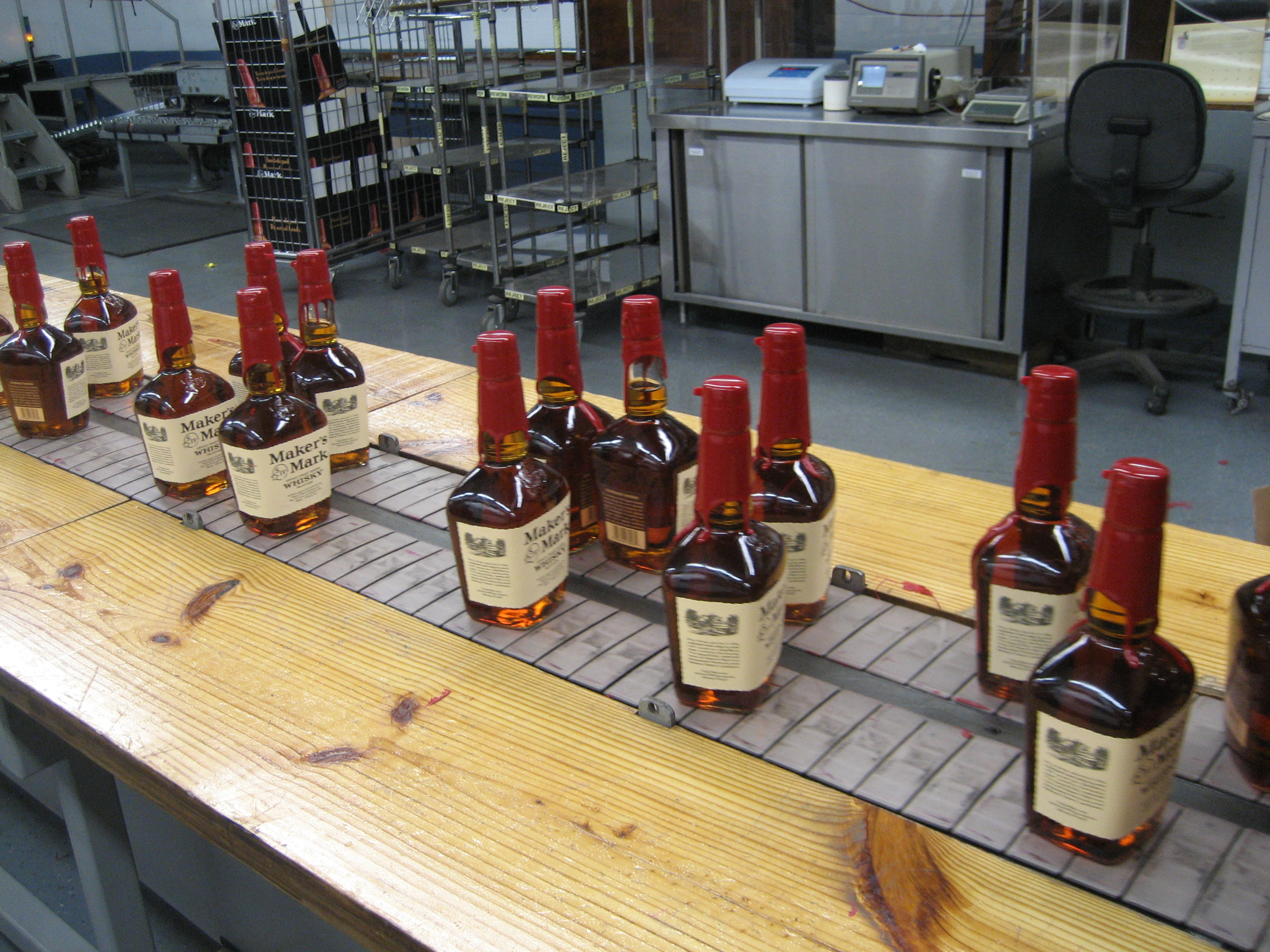
The production line at the Maker's Mark distillery

Brands are listed alphabetically by brand ownership and the name and location of the distillery. The brand owner is included if different.

- Alltech brands:
  - Lexington Brewing and Distilling Company, Lexington, Kentucky
    - Town Branch
- Brown–Forman brands:
  - Brown–Forman Distillery, Shively:
    - Old Forester
  - Woodford Reserve Distillery, Versailles
    - Woodford Reserve (small batch)
- Campari Group brands:
  - Wild Turkey Distillery, Lawrenceburg:
    - Russell's Reserve
    - Wild Turkey
- Chicken Cock Whiskey
- Diageo brands:
  - Bulleit Distillery, Shelbyville, Shelby County, Kentucky.
    - Bulleit Bourbon
- Heaven Hill Distilleries, Inc. brands:
  - Heaven Hill Distillery, Louisville:
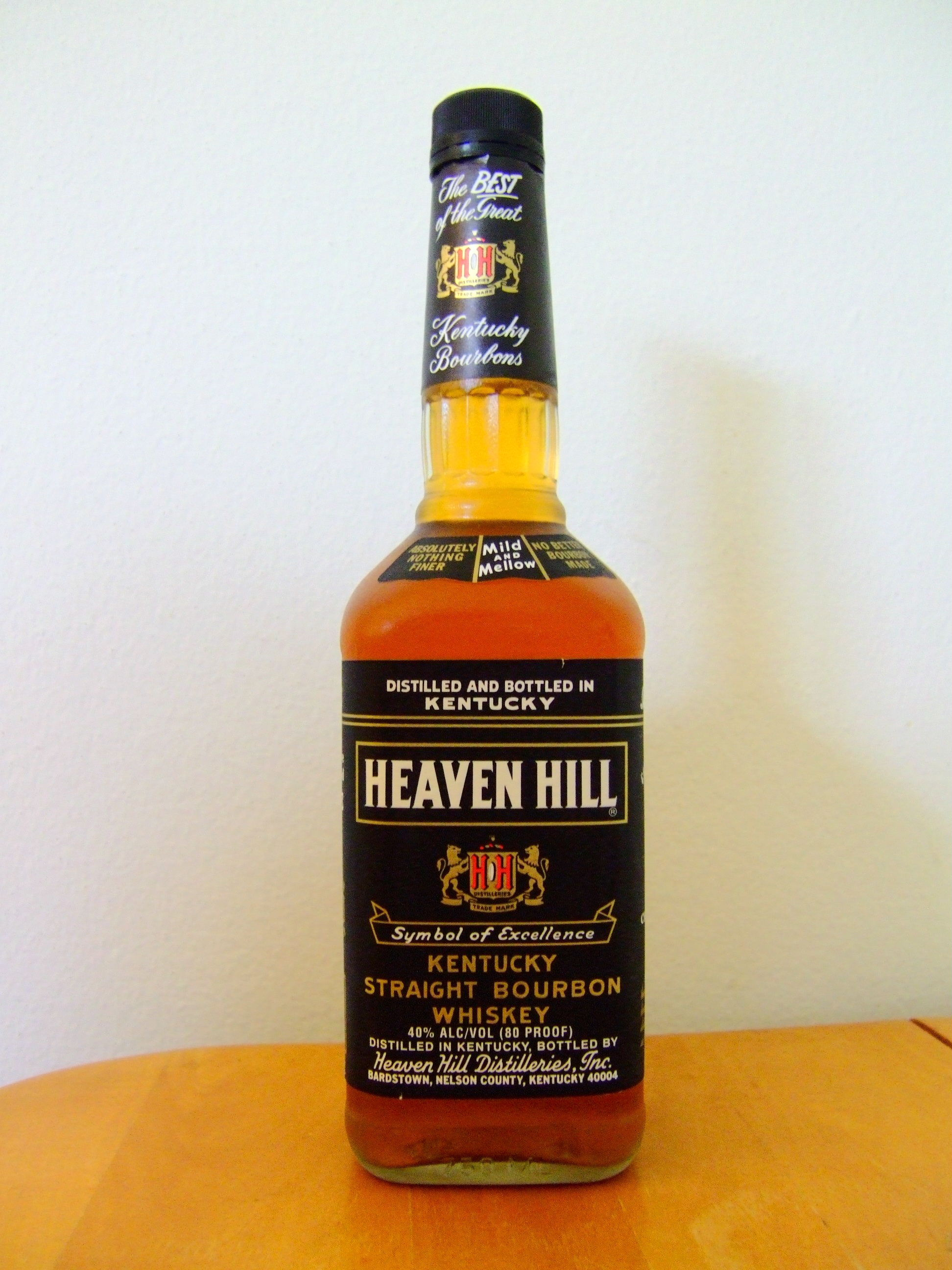
    A bottle of Heaven Hill Bourbon
    - Cabin Still
    - Elijah Craig (small batch and 18-year single barrel)
    - Evan Williams
    - Fighting Cock
    - Heaven Hill
    - J.T.S. Brown
    - Old Fitzgerald (wheated)
    - Old Heaven Hill
- Kirin brands:
  - Four Roses Distillery, Lawrenceburg
    - Four Roses
- MGP Ingredients brands:
  - Lux Row Distillery, in Bardstown, Kentucky,
    - Ezra Brooks
    - Old Ezra 101
    - Rebel Yell (wheated)
    - Yellowstone
- Pernod Ricard brands:
  - Distillery unidentified:
    - Jefferson's Bourbon
- Sazerac brands (and brands produced exclusively by Sazerac):
  - Barton 1792 Distillery, Bardstown:
    - 1792 Ridgemont Reserve
    - Early Times
    - Kentucky Gentleman
    - Kentucky Tavern
    - Ten High
    - Very Old Barton
  - Buffalo Trace Distillery, Frankfort:
    - Ancient Age
    - Blanton's (single barrel) (owned by Age International, a subsidiary of Takara Holdings)
    - Buffalo Trace
    - Eagle Rare (single barrel)
    - George T. Stagg (barrel proof, uncut, unfiltered)
    - Hancock's President's Reserve (single barrel)
    - McAfee's Benchmark
    - Old Charter
    - Old Rip Van Winkle (an Old Rip Van Winkle / Sazerac joint venture brand, wheated)
    - Old Taylor (Clermont)

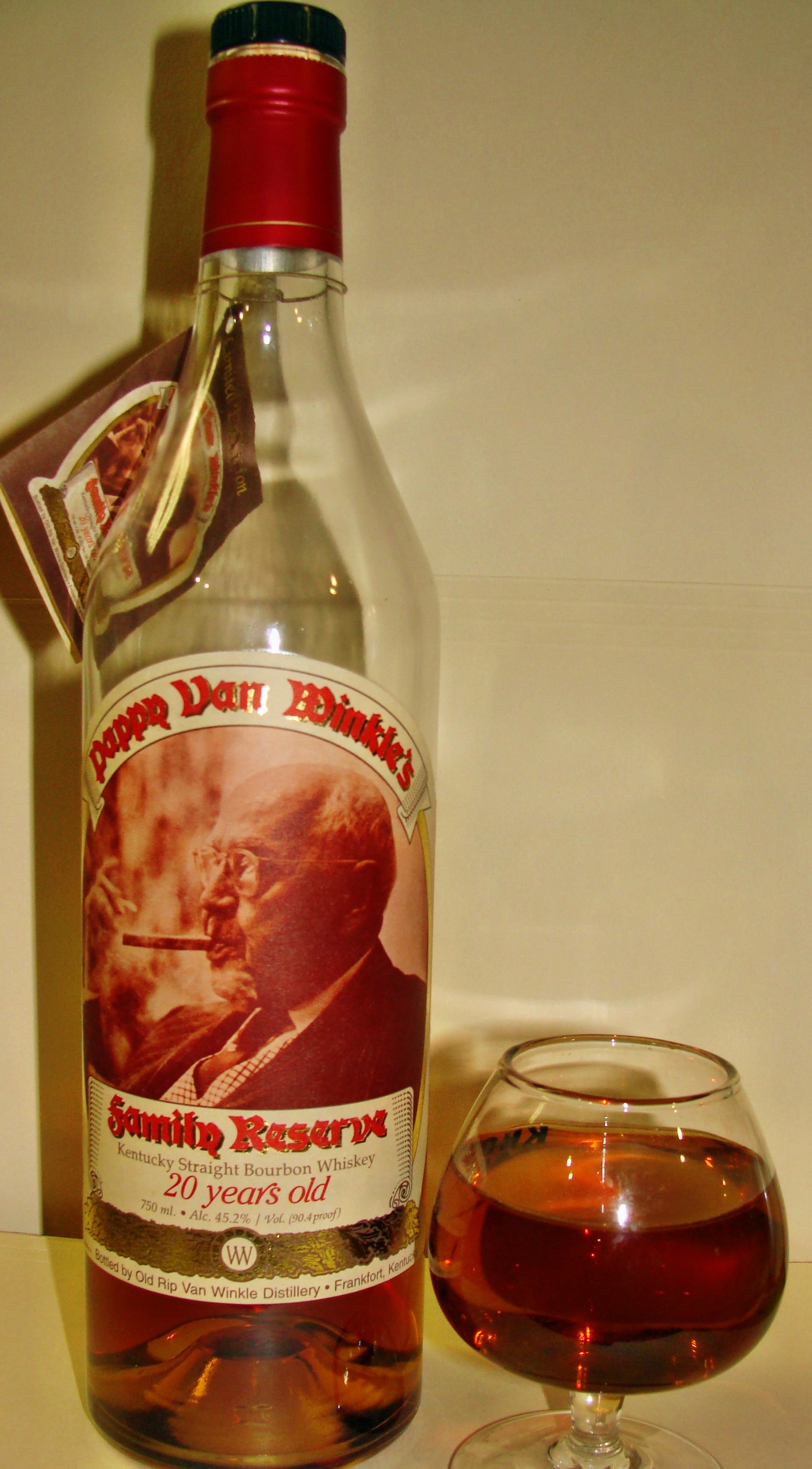
Pappy Van Winkle's Family Reserve bourbon whiskey

- Pappy Van Winkle (an Old Rip Van Winkle / Sazerac joint venture brand, wheated)
- Rock Hill Farms Single-Barrel (single barrel)
- W. L. Weller (wheated)

- Suntory Global Spirits brands
  - Jim Beam distillery Booker Noe plant, Boston, Kentucky
    - Jim Beam (also made at Jim Beam Distillery)
  - Jim Beam Distillery, Clermont:
    - Basil Hayden's (small batch)
    - Booker's (small batch)
    - Baker's (small batch)
    - Jim Beam (also made at Jim Beam distillery Booker Noe plant)
    - Knob Creek (small batch)
    - Old Crow
    - Old Grand-Dad
    - Red Stag by Jim Beam
  - Maker's Mark Distillery, Loretto
    - Maker's Mark (small batch, wheated)
- Willett Distillery brands:
  - Willett Distillery-owned brands:
    - Johnny Drum, Bardstown
    - Kentucky Vintage (small batch)
    - Noah's Mill (small batch)
    - Rowan's Creek (small batch)
    - Vintage Bourbon
    - Willett Pot Still Reserve (single barrel)
  - Brands exclusively bottled by Willett Distillery (brand owners noted):
    - Old Pogue (a Pogue brand) (small batch)
- Other brands:
  - Kentucky Owl – SPI Group (currently distilled in Harrodsburg; production to move to Bardstown in 2020)

==== Other bourbon ====
- Virginia Gentleman – A. Smith Bowman Distillery, Fredericksburg, Virginia
- Cougar Bourbon – MGP Ingredients, Lawrenceburg, Indiana (a Foster's Group brand, export only, sold in Australia and New Zealand)
- George Remus Bourbon – MGP Ingredients, Lawrenceburg, Indiana
- Kings County Bourbon, Brooklyn, New York

=== Tennessee whiskey ===
- Jack Daniel's (a Brown–Forman brand), Lynchburg
- George Dickel (a Diageo brand), Tullahoma
- Uncle Nearest Premium Whiskey, Shelbyville
- Benjamin Prichard's Tennessee Whiskey, Kelso
- Chattanooga Whiskey, Chattanooga (not yet producing Tennessee whiskey)

=== Corn whiskey ===
- Georgia Moon Corn Whiskey, Heaven Hill Distilleries, Louisville, Kentucky
- Kings County Distillery Corn Whiskey, Kings County Distillery, Brooklyn, New York
- Mellow Corn Kentucky Straight Corn Whiskey, Heaven Hill Distilleries, Louisville, Kentucky
- Midnight Moon, Piedmont Distillers, Madison, North Carolina
- Ole Smoky, Ole Smoky Distillery, Gatlinburg, Tennessee
- Platte Valley 100% Straight Corn Whiskey, McCormick Distilling Company, Weston, Missouri
- The Gonzales Corn Whiskey, Clifford Distilling LLC, Port Arthur, Texas

=== Rye whiskey ===
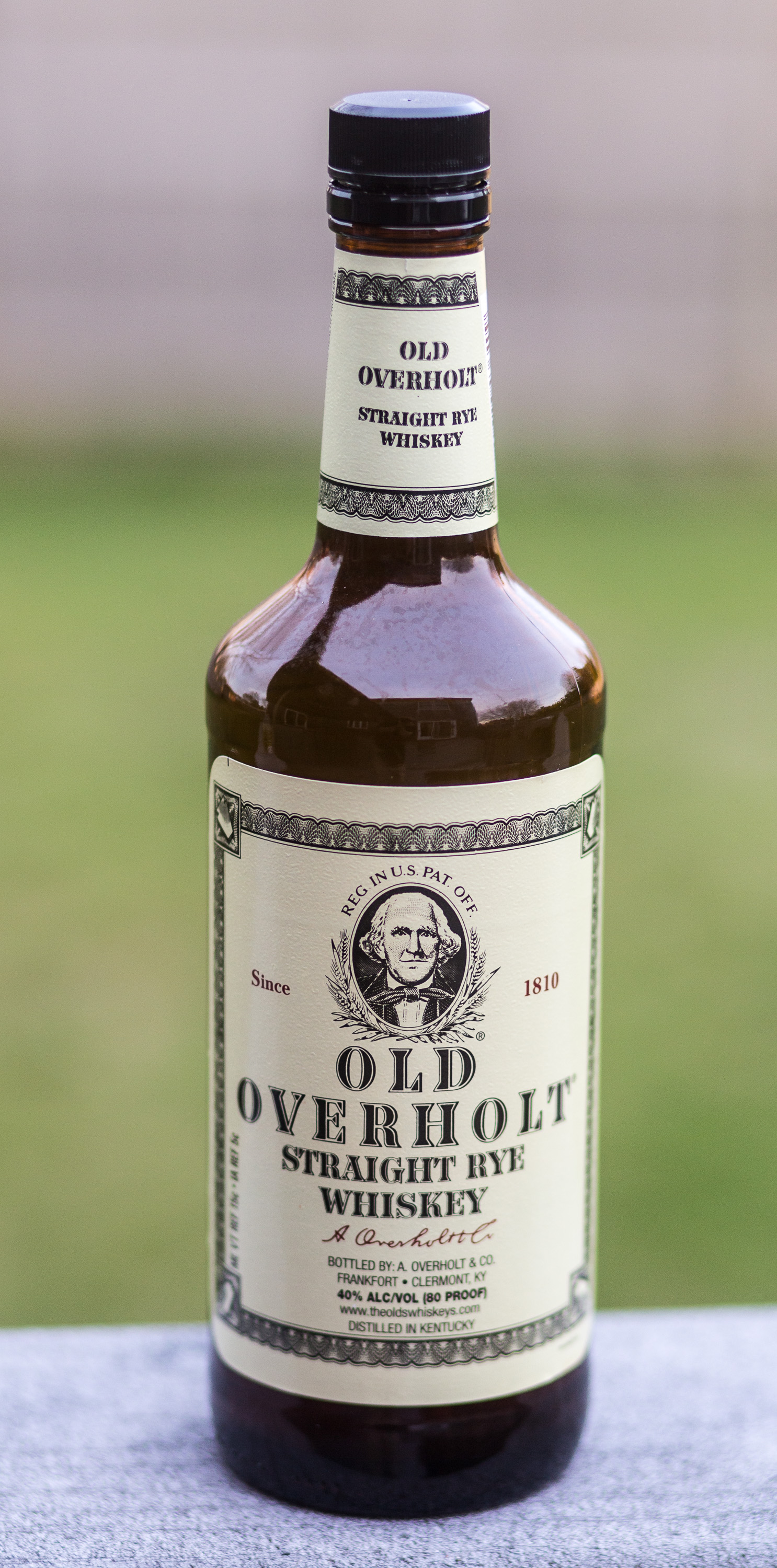
A bottle of American Old Overholt rye whiskey

- Diageo brands:
  - Bulleit Rye
  - Dickel Rye
- MGP Ingredients brands:
  - High West Rye
  - Templeton Rye
- Sazerac brands (and brands produced exclusively by Sazerac):
  - Van Winkle Family Reserve Rye
- Suntory Global Spirits brands:
  - Jim Beam Rye
  - Knob Creek Rye
  - Old Overholt
- Independent
  - Copper Fox Rye
  - George Washington's Rye Whiskey, Mount Vernon, Virginia
  - Leopold Bro's Maryland-style Rye -Denver, Colorado
  - Town Branch Rye – Lexington Brewing and Distilling Company, Lexington, Kentucky]
  - Roundstone Rye – Catoctin Creek
  - WhistlePig Rye – Shoreham, Vermont
  - Wigle Reserve Pennsylvania Straight Rye – Pittsburgh, Pennsylvania

=== Malt whiskey ===
- American Single Malt Whiskey (Peach Street Distillers), Palisade, Colorado
- Hamilton Distillers, Tucson, Arizona
- McCarthy's, Mt. Hood, Oregon
- Pearse Lyons Reserve (Lexington Brewing and Distilling Company), Lexington, Kentucky
- St. George Single Malt, Alameda, California
- Stranahan's, Denver, Colorado
- Wasmunds (Copper Fox Distillery), Sperryville, Virginia
- Westland Distillery, Seattle

=== Wheat whiskey ===
- Bernheim Original – Heaven Hill Distillery, Louisville, Kentucky

=== Blended whiskey ===
- Diageo brands, Stamford, Connecticut
  - Seagram's Seven Crown
- Heaven Hill brands, Heaven Hill Distillery, Louisville, Kentucky
  - Heaven Hill Kentucky Whiskey
- Sazerac brands (and brands produced exclusively by Sazerac) at the Tom Moore Distillery, Bardstown, Kentucky
  - Barton Premium Blend
  - Kentucky Gentleman
  - Old Thompson
- Sazerac brands at other distilleries
  - Ancient Age – Buffalo Trace Distillery, Frankfort, Kentucky
- Suntory Global Spirits brands, Jim Beam Distillery, Clermont, Kentucky
  - Beam's Eight Star
  - Calvert Extra
  - Kessler

== Australian whisky ==
Australia produces a number of single malt whiskies. Tasmanian whiskies in particular were the first to receive global attention. Australian whiskies are winning an increasing number of global whisky awards and medals, including for example in the World Whiskies Awards and Jim Murray's Whisky Bible 'Liquid Gold Awards'. Mainland Australian whiskies are also obtaining global recognition, in particular a West Australian whisky.

Australian whisky distilleries include:

- Archie Rose Distilling Co., Sydney
- Hellyers Road Distillery, Tasmania
- Hoochery Distillery, (Raymond B Desert III Corn Whiskey), Kununurra, Western Australia
- Lark Distillery, Tasmania
- Timboon Railway Shed Distillery, Timboon, Victoria

== Canadian whisky ==
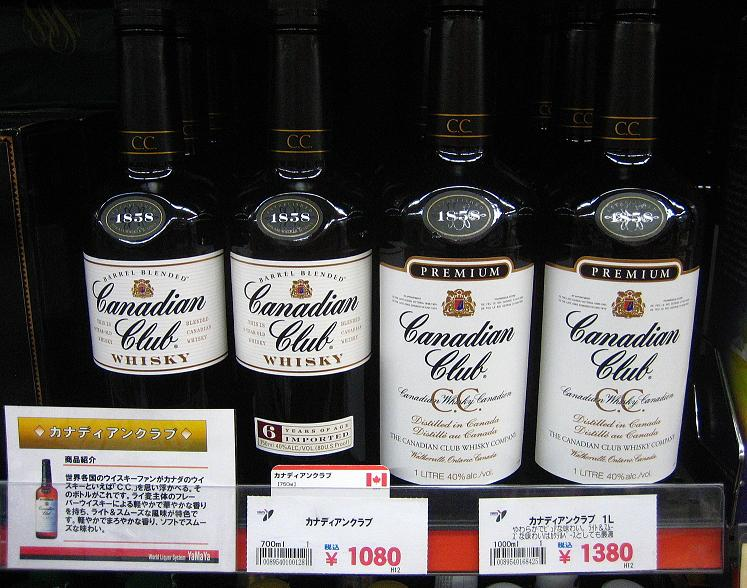
Bottles of Canadian Club Whisky for sale at a liquor store in Iizaka, Fukushima, Japan

- Brown-Forman
  - Canadian Mist – Canadian Mist Distillery, Collingwood, Ontario
- Diageo
  - Crown Royal
- Gruppo Campari
  - Forty Creek – Grimsby, Ontario
- Glenora Distillers, Glenville, Nova Scotia (independent)
  - Glen Breton Rare
- Heaven Hill
  - Pendleton Whisky
- Pemberton Distillery (independent)
- Pernod Ricard brands via Corby Distilleries, produced at the Hiram Walker Distillery, Windsor, Ontario
  - Wiser's
- Sazerac Company brands
  - Fireball Cinnamon Whisky
  - Northern Light
- Suntory Global Spirits brands
  - Alberta Premium
  - Canadian Club
- William Grant & Sons, Windsor, Ontario
  - Gibson's Finest
- Yukon Brewing Company, Whitehorse, Yukon
  - Two Brewers Yukon Single Malt

== Finnish whisky ==
- Kyrö
- Old Buck
- Teerenpeli

== French whisky ==
- Glann ar Mor

== German whisky ==
- Schlitzer
- Slyrs

== Indian whisky ==
=== Blended ===
- After Dark
- Antiquity
- Bagpiper
- Blenders Pride
- Director's Special
- Imperial Blue
- McDowell's No.1
- Officer's Choice
- Peter Scot
- Red Knight
- Rowson's Reserve
- Royal Challenge
- Royal Stag
- Signature

=== Indian single malts ===
- Amrut
- Paul John
- Rampur. Radico Khaitan distillery
- indri whisky

== Irish whiskey ==
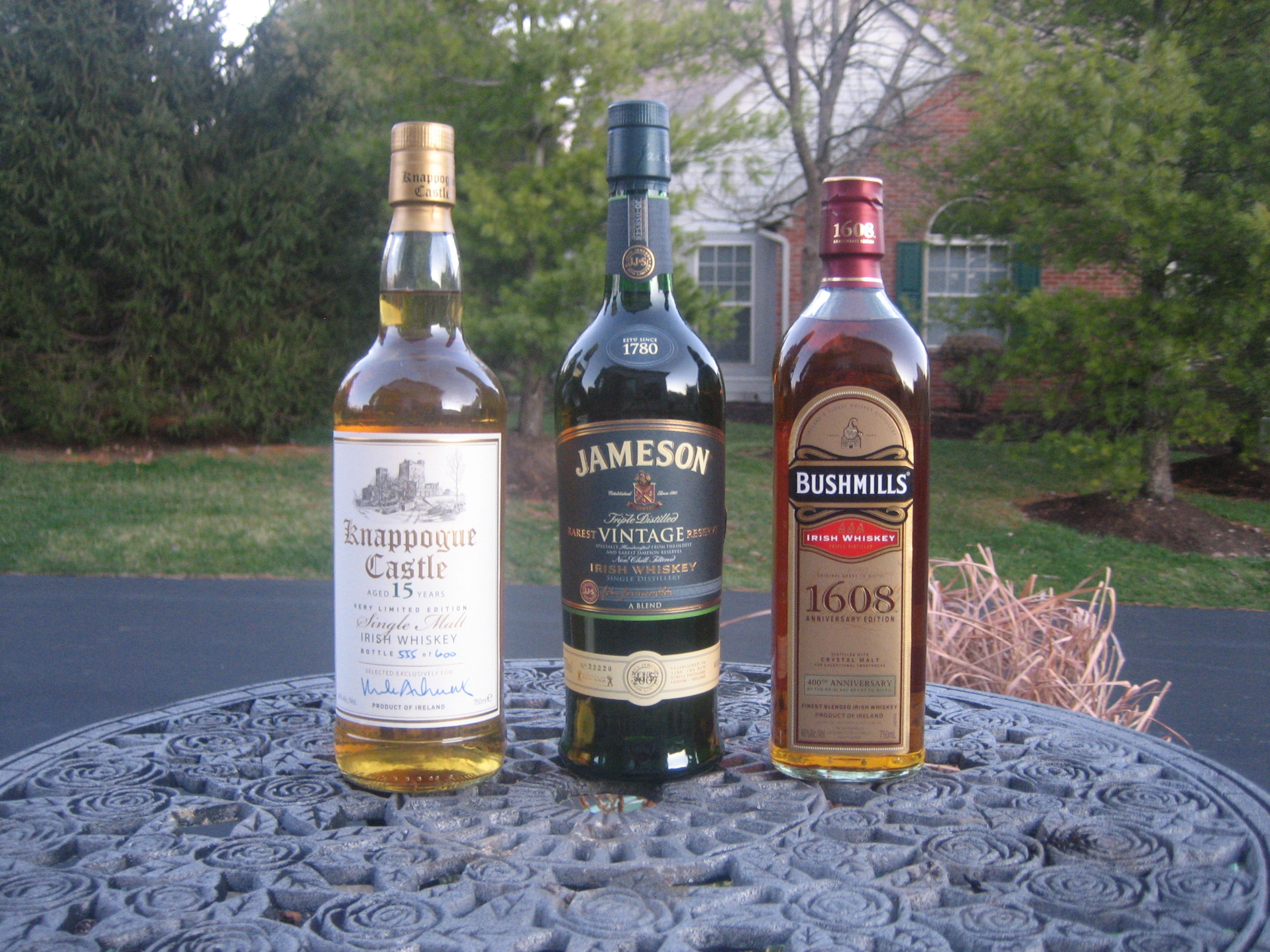
Three Irish whiskeys

=== Irish single malts ===
- Bushmills Single Malt
- Dingle Single Malt
- Knappogue Castle
- Teeling Single Malt
- Tullamore Single malt
- Tyrconnell

=== Single pot still whiskeys ===
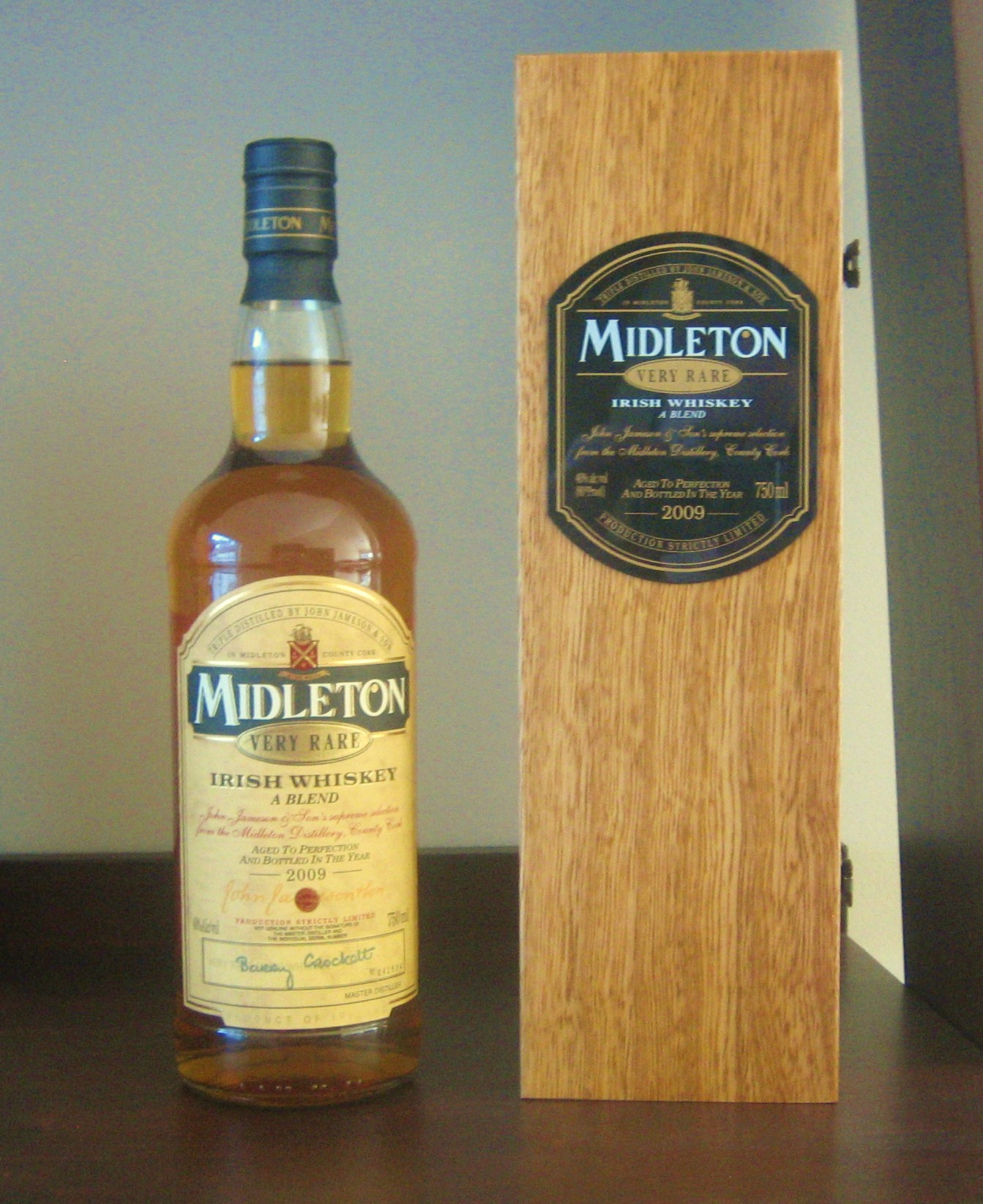
Midleton Very Rare with box

- Comber (defunct)
- Dingle Single Pot Still
- Drumshanbo
- Dunville's Three Crowns (defunct)
- Dunville's VR (defunct)
- Green Spot
- Midleton Barry Crockett Legacy Single Pot Still
- Powers
- Redbreast
- Teeling Single Pot Still

=== Blended Irish whiskeys ===
- Bushmills
- Clontarf 1014
- Jameson
- Kilbeggan
- Midleton Very Rare
- Paddy
- Roe & Co
- Teeling Small Batch
- Tullamore D.E.W.

=== Single grain Irish whiskeys ===
- Kilbeggan Single Grain
- Teeling Single Grain

== Japanese whisky ==
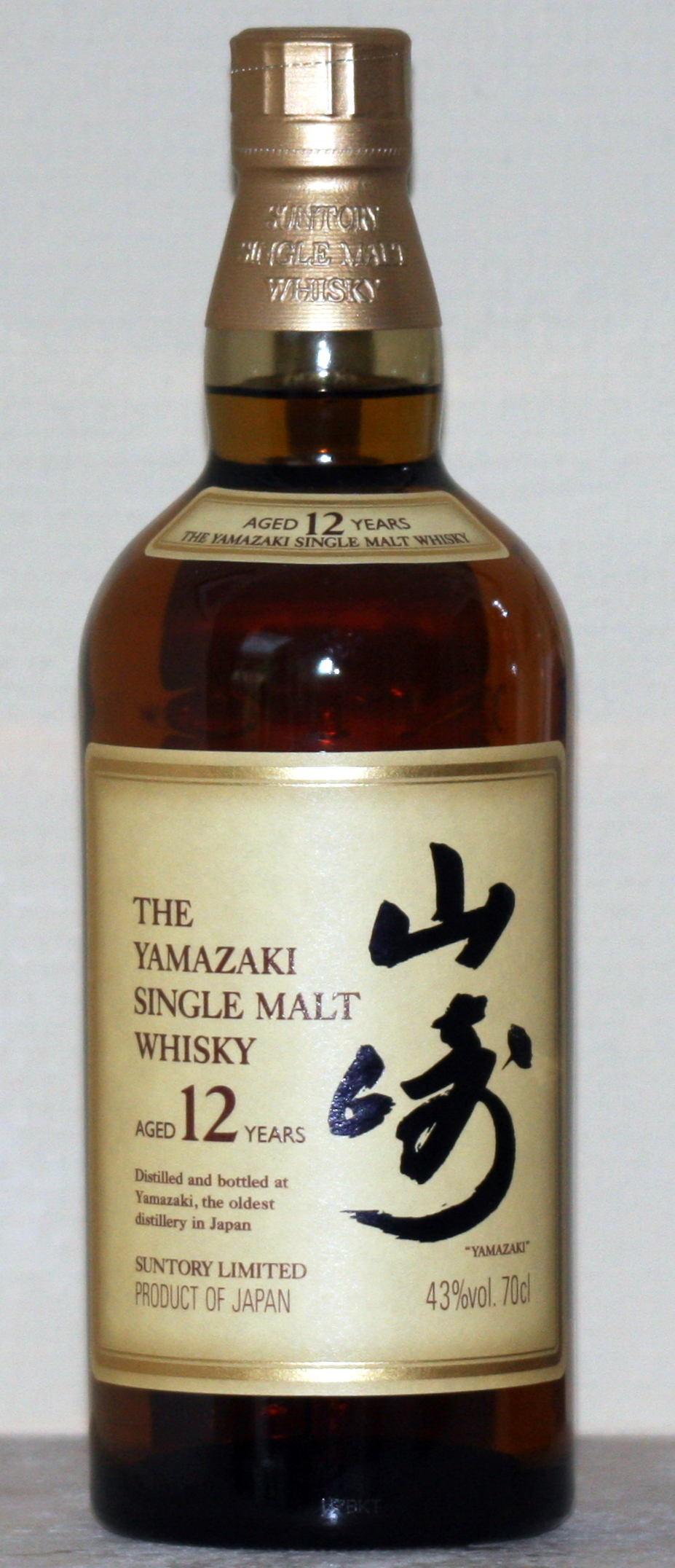
A bottle of Japanese Yamazaki whisky

- Akashi
- Fuji Gotemba
- Hakushu
- Hibiki
- Miyagikyo
- Yamazaki
- Yoichi

== United Kingdom ==
=== England ===
- Cotswolds
- The English Whisky Co.
- Sacred Spirits
- Adnams
- Oxford Rye
- Lakes
- Ad Gerfrin

=== Scotland ===
| Type | Region | Distilleries |
|---|---|---|
| Single malt | Campbeltown single malts | Campbeltown; Glen Scotia; Hazelburn; Longrow; Springbank |
| Single malt | Highland single malts | Aberfeldy; AnCnoc; Ardmore; Ardnamurchan; Balblair; Ben Nevis; Blair Athol; Brora; Clynelish; Dalmore; Dalwhinnie; Deanston; Edradour; Fettercairn; Glen Albyn; Glencadam; Glen Deveron; Glendronach; Glen Garioch; Glenglassaugh; Glengoyne; Glenmorangie; Glen Ord; Glenturret; Glenugie; Glenury Royal; GlenWyvis; Knockdhu; Loch Lomond; McClelland; Millburn; Nc'nean; North Port; Oban; Old Pulteney; Royal Brackla; Royal Lochnagar; The Singleton of Glen Ord; Strathearn; Teaninich; Tomatin; Tullibardine; Wolfburn |
| Single malt | Island single malts | Abhainn; Arran; Barra; Harris; Highland Park; Jura; Raasay; Scapa; Talisker; Tobermory; Torabhaig |
| Single malt | Islay single malts | Ardbeg; Bowmore; Bruichladdich; Bunnahabhain; Caol Ila; Kilchoman; Lagavulin; Laphroaig; Port Askaig; Port Charlotte; Port Ellen |
| Single malt | Lowland single malts | Ailsa Bay; Annandale; Auchentoshan; Bladnoch; Daftmill; Glenflagler; Glenkinchie; Glen Turner; Jackton; Kinclaith; Littlemill; Rosebank; St Magdalene |
| Single malt | Speyside single malts | A'bunadh; Aberlour; Allt-A-Bhainne; Ardmore; Auchroisk; Aultmore; Balmenach; Balvenie; BenRiach; Benrinnes; Benromach; Braeval; Caperdonich; Cardhu; Cragganmore; Craigellachie; Dailuaine; Dallas Dhu; Dufftown; Glen Elgin; Glen Grant; Glen Keith; Glen Moray; Glen Spey; Glenallachie; Glenburgie; Glendullan; Glenfarclas; Glenfiddich; The Glenlivet; The Glenrothes; Glentauchers; Imperial; Inchgower; Kininvie; Knockando; Linkwood; Longmorn; The Macallan; Mannochmore; Miltonduff; Mortlach; Pittyvaich; Speyburn; Strathisla; Strathmill; Tamdhu; Tamnavulin; Tomintoul; Tormore |
| Grain scotch | | Cameronbridge; Girvan; Invergordon; North British; Starlaw; Strathclyde |
| Blended malt | | Angels' Nectar; Monkey Shoulder |
| Blended whisky | | Ballantine's; Bell's; Black & White; Black Bottle; Buchanan's; Chivas Regal; Clan MacGregor; Cutty Sark; Dewar's; The Famous Grouse; Grand Old Parr; Grant's; Haig; Hankey Bannister; House of Hazelwood; J&B; Johnnie Walker; Label 5; Logan; Old St Andrews; Passport Scotch; Raer; Royal Salute; SIA Scotch Whisky; Something Special; Té Bheag; Teacher's Highland Cream; Vat 69; White Horse; Whyte & Mackay; William Lawson's |
| Independent bottlers | Adelphi; Blackadder; Compass Box; Douglas Laing & Co; Duncan Taylor; Gordon & MacPhail; Highfern; Murray McDavid; Scotch Malt Whisky Society | |
| Overseas bottlers | 100 Pipers (bottled in India); Black Dog (bottled in India) | |

==== Defunct distilleries ====
- Bailie Nicol Jarvie
- Peter Thomson
- Pattisons
- Samuel Dow

=== Wales ===
- Penderyn

== Other whiskies ==
- The Milk & Honey Distillery – Israel
- Manx Spirit – Isle of Man
- Frysk Hynder – Netherlands
- Three Ships – South Africa
- Whisky DYC – Spain
- Mackmyra – Sweden
- Smögen – Sweden
- Langatun Whisky – Switzerland
- Stauning Whisky – Denmark
- Kavalan – Taiwan

== See also ==
- List of gin brands
- List of rum brands
- List of tequilas
- List of vodka brands
