= Dunville =

Dunville may refer to:

- Dunville, Newfoundland and Labrador, a place in Newfoundland, Canada
- Dunnville, Ontario, a place in Ontario, Canada
- John Dunville, an Irish founder of Dunville & Co
- John Dunville, an English Victoria Cross recipient
