= Old St. Andrew's =

Old St. Andrew's may refer to:

- Old St Andrews, a brand of Scotch whisky
- Old St. Andrew's Parish Church, NRHP-listed Anglican building in Charleston, South Carolina, USA, and the oldest surviving church building in South Carolina
- Old St. Andrew's Episcopal Church, or St. Andrew's Episcopal Church, a historic building in Jacksonville, Florida, USA
- Old St. Andrew's Presbyterian Church, now St. Andrew's Evangelical Lutheran Church in Toronto, Ontario, Canada
- Old St Andrew's Church, Kingsbury, a closed church in the Kingsbury area of Greater London
