= Stephen Paul (woodworker) =

American woodworker and craft distiller

Stephen Paul (born May 1, 1951) is an American woodworker and craft distiller from the state of Arizona. Paul founded furniture company Arroyo Design known for the production of fine mesquite furniture and has been featured in national and regional magazines including: Old House Interiors, House Beautiful, Metropolitan Home, and Phoenix Home and Garden. In 2006, Paul founded Hamilton Distillers, the largest Whiskey Distillery in Southern Arizona.
