= Frysk Hynder =

Dutch single malt whiskey

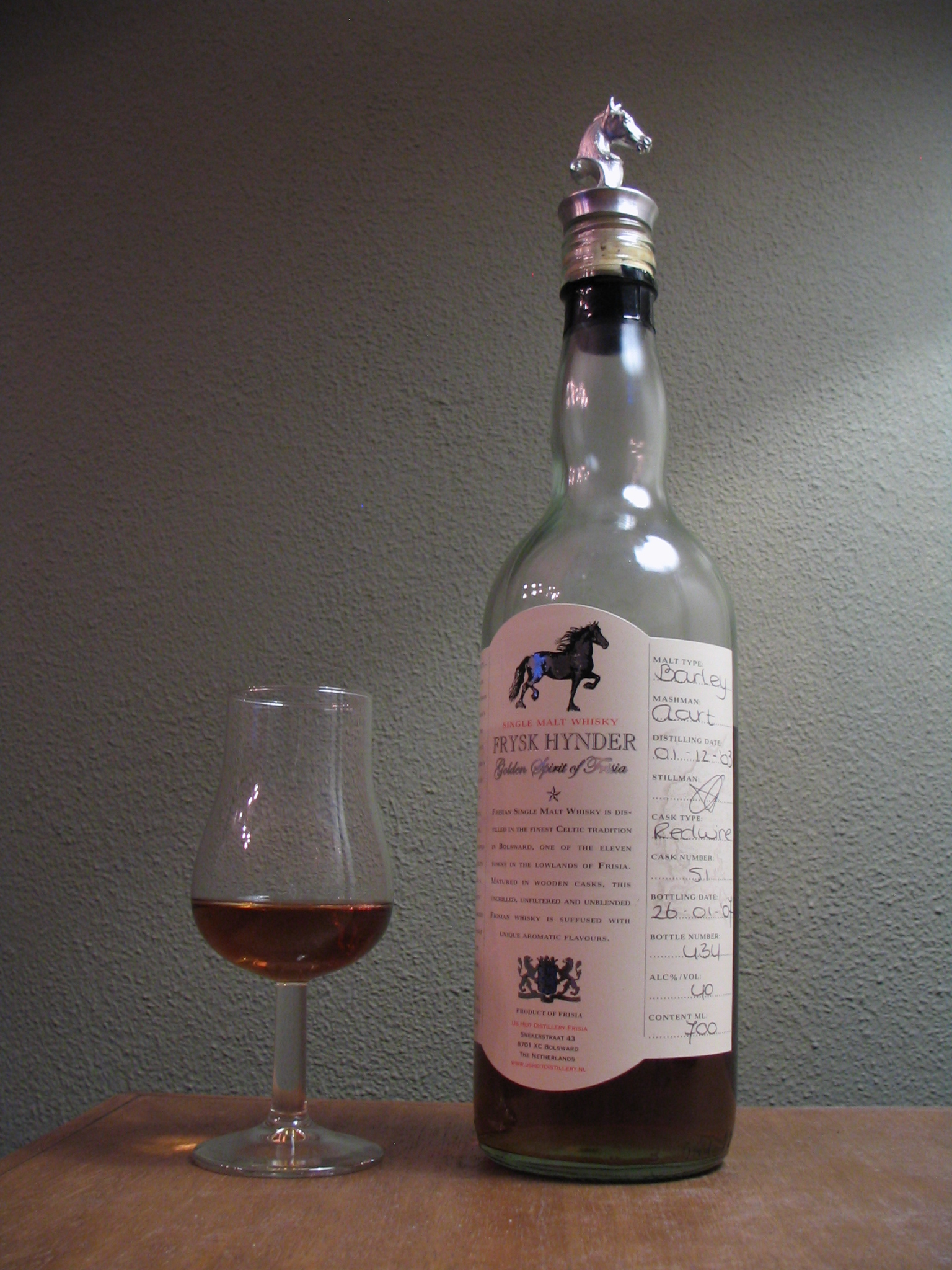
Bottle of Frysk Hynder

Frysk Hynder Single Malt is a Dutch single malt whisky, distilled and bottled in the Frisian Us Heit Distillery. Frysk Hynder (Frisian horse) is the first single malt produced in the Netherlands, and started off as a hobby project in the Us Heit beer brewery. The daily production is only 77 bottles.

== See also ==
- Whisky
- List of whiskey brands
