= Copper Fox Distillery =

Coordinates: 38.658°N 78.217°W

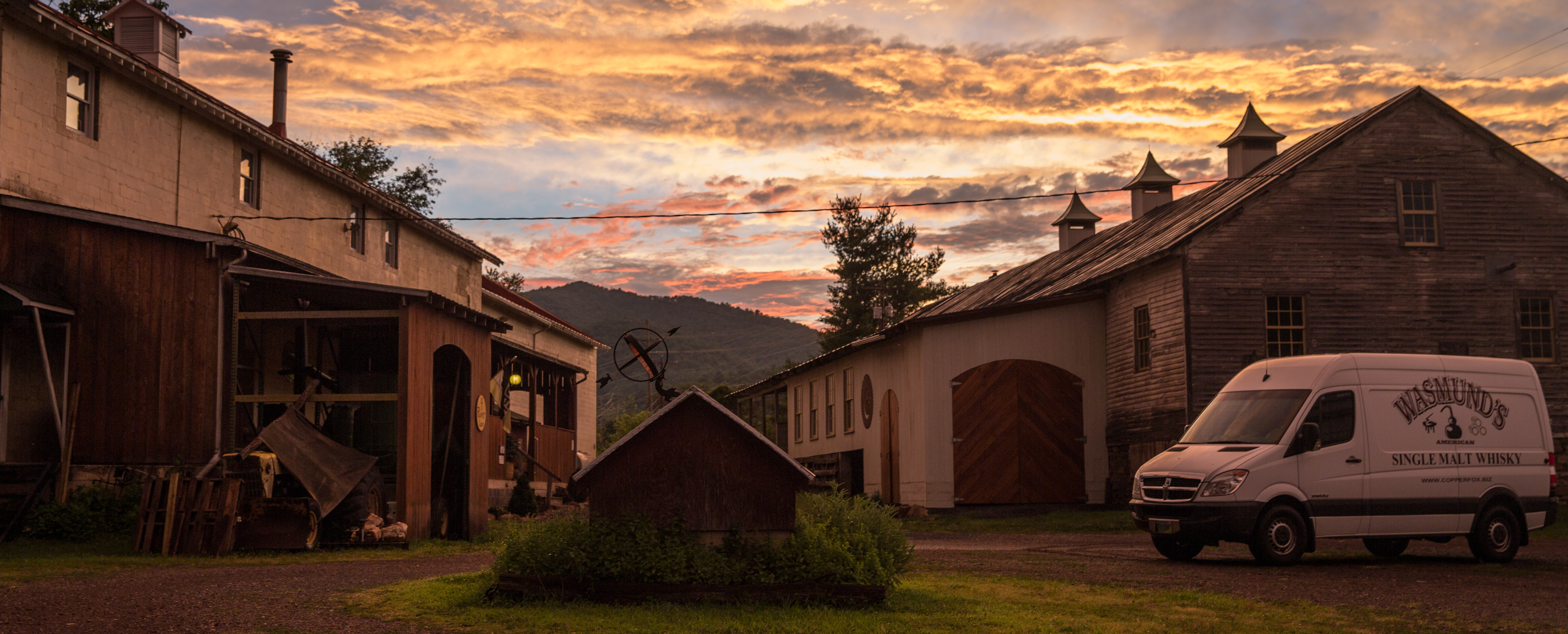
- View of the Copper Fox Distillery in Sperryville, VA
- Industry: Distillation
- Founded: 2005
- Founder: Rick Wasmund
- Products: American whiskey
- Website: www.copperfoxdistillery.com

Copper Fox Distillery is a distillery that produces American whiskey in Sperryville, Virginia and Williamsburg, VA. The owner and operator of the distillery is Rick Wasmund.

== History ==
Before starting Copper Fox, Wasmund apprenticed for six weeks at the Bowmore distillery on the Isle of Islay, learning the art of floor malting. The distillery was licensed to begin distilling by the Virginia ABC board in 2005 as a limited distiller (<5,000 gallons), and that year, Copper Fox opened its first distillery in Sperryville, VA, in a converted apple packaging plant. It purchased the historic Lord Paget Motor Inn in Williamsburg, VA, in 2015 as a second distilling location which was opened in 2016.

== Process ==
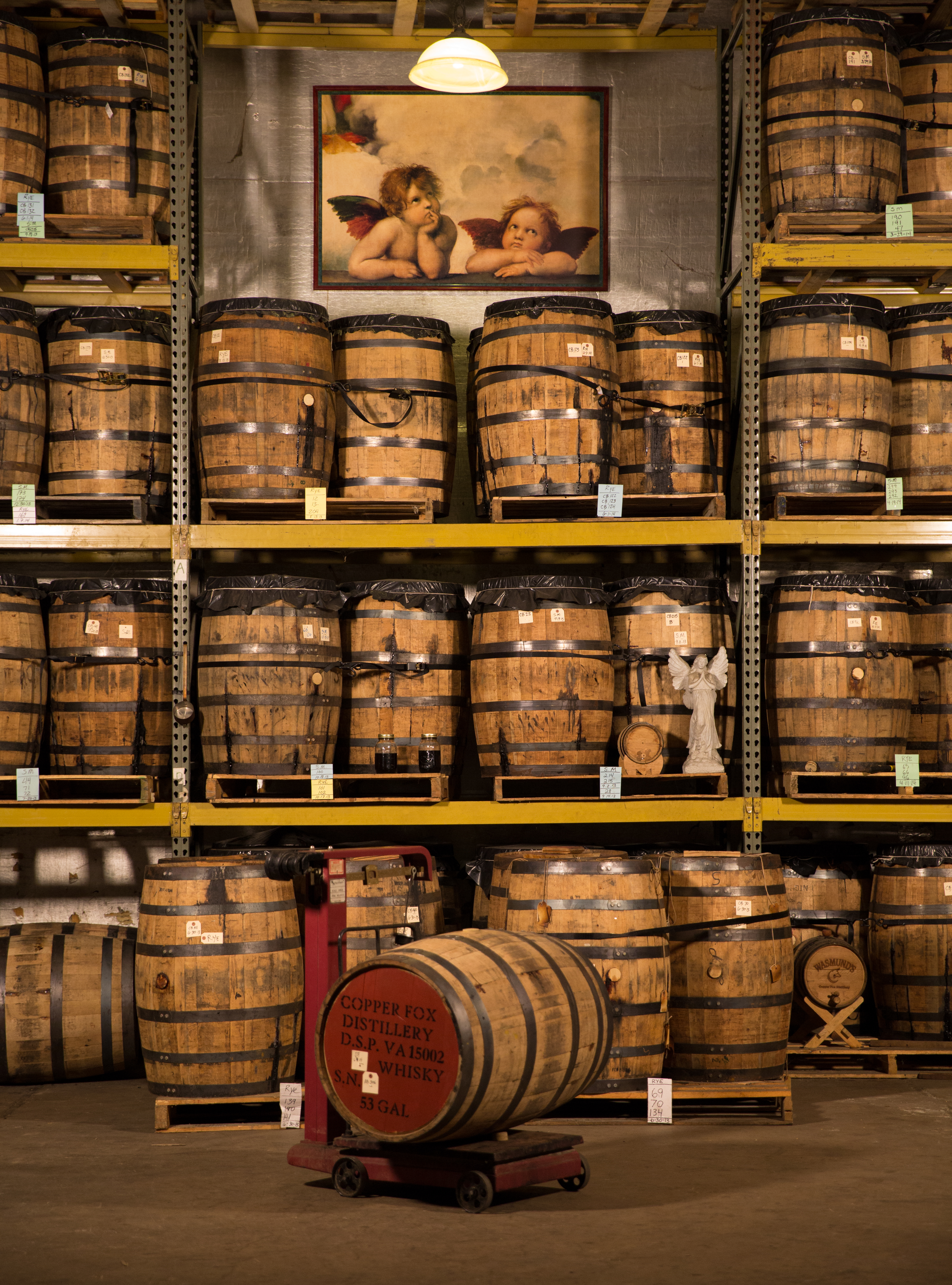
Barrels aging at the Copper Fox Distillery in Sperryville, VA

Copper Fox uses barley bred specifically for the distillery and grown in Virginia, and Copper Fox is the only distiller in the United States to do 100% of its own malting. During the malt drying process, fruitwood (including applewood and cherrywood) smokes the grain, similar to peat smoke use in Scotch whiskies. All the wood used for the smoke comes from local orchards. In addition to malting for their own products, Copper Fox sells a portion of their malt to breweries, who use it to make beer.

Copper Fox whisky is distilled in a copper pot still and aged in used bourbon barrels (from another Virginia distillery, A. Smith Bowman, maker of Virginia Gentleman bourbon. Copper Fox utilizes 'chipping' in the aging of their whisky, adding a sachet of small chunks or 'chips' of charred wood to the aging barrel. Using this accelerated technique, Copper Fox whiskies are aged at a minimum of twelve months, compared to the 3 year minimum for Scotch Whisky. In addition to single malt whiskies, Copper Fox produces whiskies made from rye, clear spirits, and a botanical gin. They also plan on releasing a bourbon in the future. All bottles of alcohol produced at Copper Fox are filled and labelled by hand.
