= Dunville's Three Crowns =

Brand of whiskey

Three Crowns
- Type: Irish Whiskey
- Manufacturer: Dunville & Co
- Origin: Belfast
- Introduced: 1837
- Discontinued: 1936
- Proof (US): 70
- Related products: Dunville's VR

Dunville's Three Crowns was a rare pure pot still whiskey distilled by Dunville & Co at the Royal Irish Distillery in Belfast. Though similar to Dunville's other whiskey Dunville's VR, Three Crowns was aged longer and used more sherry casks for the maturing process.

== The Echlinville Distillery ==
Dunville's Three Crowns Irish Whiskey and Dunville's VR Old Irish Whiskey are now being produced at the Echlinville Distillery in Kircubbinin, County Down, and came on the market in 2016.
