= Bowmore distillery =

Scotch whisky distillery on Islay, Scotland

Coordinates: 55°45′25.7″N 6°17′23.44″W

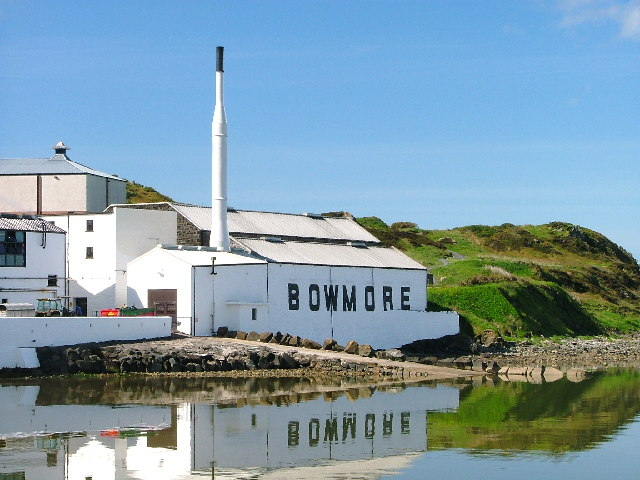

Region: Islay
- Owner: Suntory Global Spirits
- Founded: 1779
- Status: Operational
- Water source: River Laggan, Islay
- No. of stills: 2 wash 2 spirit
- Capacity: 1,700,000 L

Bowmore
- Age(s): Legend; 12-year-old 15-year-old 18-year-old 25-year-old
- Cask type(s): American Oak (86%); Sherry (14%)

Bowmore distillery (/boʊˈmɔːr/ boh-MOR, Scottish Gaelic: Taigh-staile Bogh Mòr) is an Islay single malt Scotch whisky distillery located on the Isle of Islay, an island of the Inner Hebrides.

The distillery, which lies on the South Eastern shore of Loch Indaal, is one of the oldest in Scotland. It is said to have been established in 1779 and is the oldest running distillery on Islay. The distillery is owned by Morrison Bowmore Distillers Ltd, a holding company owned by Suntory Global Spirits, a subsidiary of Suntory Holdings of Osaka, Japan.

== History ==
The Bowmore Distillery was established in 1779 by a local merchant, John P. Simson, before passing into the ownership of the Mutter family, a family of German descent. James Mutter, head of the family, also had farming interests and was Vice Consul representing the Ottoman Empire, Portugal, and Brazil through their Glasgow consulates. There are no records that pinpoint the date Mutter acquired the distillery from Simpson. Mutter would introduce a number of innovative processes to the distillery during his tenure and even had a small iron steam ship built to import barley and coal from the mainland and to export the whisky to Glasgow. A bottle of 1850 Bowmore Single Malt was sold at an auction in September 2007 for £29,400.

The distillery was closed in 1915 until it was bought from the Mutter family in 1925 by J.B. Sheriff & Co. and remained under their ownership until being purchased by Inverness-based William Grigor & Son, Ltd. in 1950.

During the World Wars the Bowmore Distillery halted production, and hosted the RAF Coastal Command for much of World War II, Coastal Command operated flying boats from Loch Indaal on anti-submarine warfare missions.

Stanley P. Morrison and James Howat formed Stanley P. Morrison Ltd. in 1951, and this company formed Morrison's Bowmore Distillery, Ltd. in 1963 in order to take over the Bowmore Distillery. Stanley P. Morrison died in 1971, and control of the companies passed to Brian Morrison.

In 1994 the Japanese distiller Suntory bought Morrison Bowmore Distillers Ltd. Suntory had previously been a shareholder in Morrison Bowmore for several years. Morrison Bowmore also own the Auchentoshan and Glen Garioch distilleries and produce the McClelland's Single Malt range of bottlings.

In August 2024, Bowmore distillery unveiled an updated bottle design and two new ranges.

== Production ==
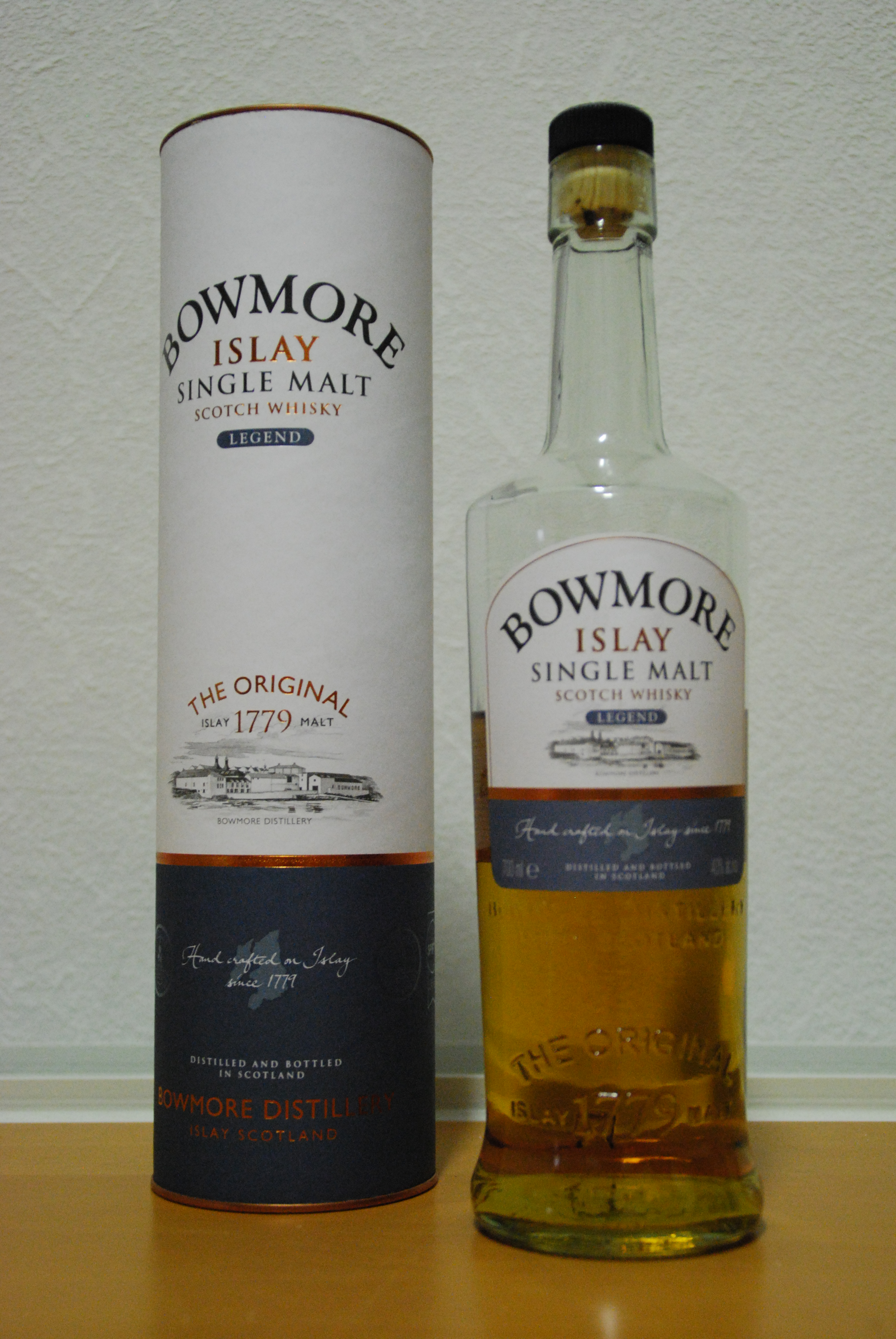
Bowmore Legend

Bowmore Distillery sources as much barley as possible from on the island of Islay, but there are insufficient quantities produced to satisfy the distillery's demand, so barley is also imported from the mainland. The distillery retains a traditional floor malting, but this also lacks sufficient capacity; the barley imported from the mainland is normally already malted.

The distillery has an annual capacity of two million litres, with fermentation undertaken in traditional wooden washbacks before the liquid is passed through two wash stills and then through two spirit stills.

The waste heat from the distillation process goes to heat a nearby public swimming pool that was built in one of the distillery's former warehouses.

Morrison Bowmore bottles all whisky produced at Bowmore Distillery and their other distilleries at a facility in Springburn, Glasgow.

== See also ==
- Islay whisky
- Whisky
- Scotch whisky
- List of whisky brands
- List of distilleries in Scotland
- List of historic whisky distilleries
