= Sia Scotch Whisky =

Brand of Scotch Whiskey

SIA Scotch Whisky
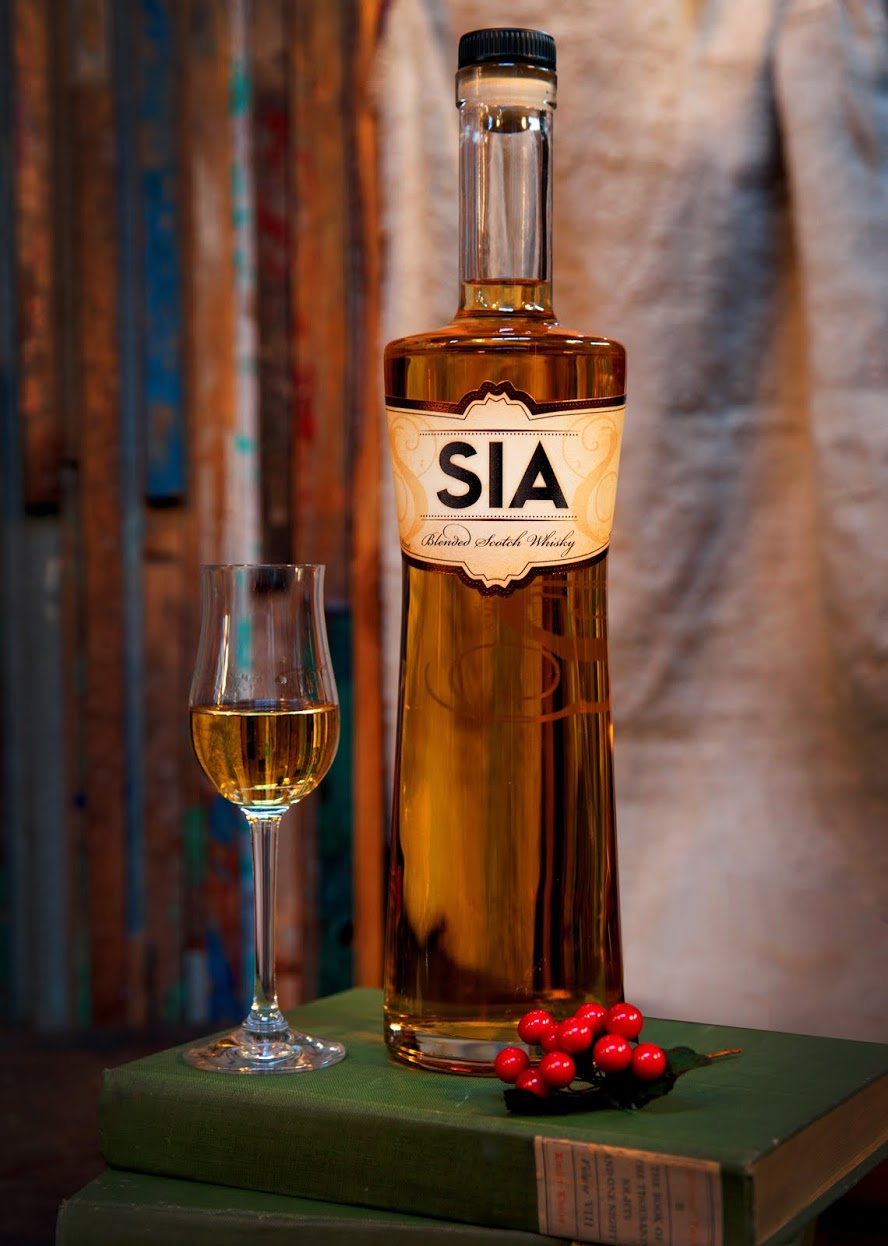
- A bottle of SIA Scotch Whisky
- Type: Blended Scotch whisky
- Country of origin: Scotland
- Introduced: 2014
- Alcohol by volume: 43%
- Proof (US): 86
- Website: www.siascotch.com

SIA Scotch Whisky (pronounced "see-a") is a brand of Scotch whisky. It is a blend of Speyside, Highland and Islay malt and grain whiskies. The brand was created by its founder Carin Luna-Ostaseski with help from a Kickstarter funding campaign.

== Awards and ratings ==
- Double Gold, 2014 San Francisco World Spirits Competition
- 91 points, Wine Enthusiast Magazine
- 90 points, Whisky Advocate Magazine
- 96 points, 2016 Ultimate Spirits Challenge
