= Smögen Whisky =

Swedish distillery

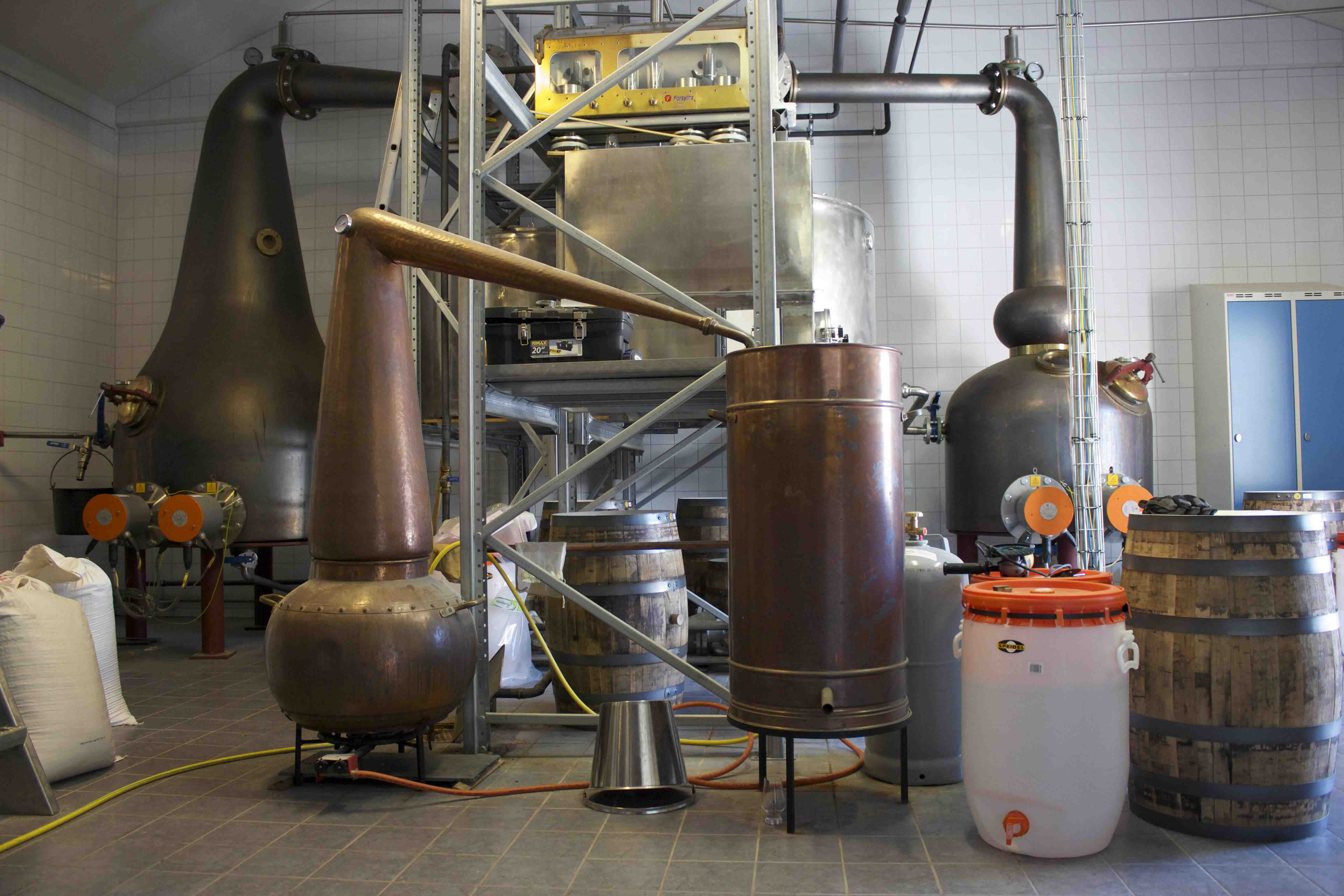
The stills at Smögen Whisky

Smögen Whisky is a distillery in Sweden which produces single malt whisky and gin. Established in 2009 by Pär Caldenby, a lawyer, whisky enthusiast and author of Enjoying Malt Whisky, the Smögen Distillery produced its first spirit in 2010 after receiving a grant of almost a million Swedish krona from the government. The distillery is located on a farm near Hunnebostrand, on the west coast of Sweden, north of Gothenburg. The distillery is named after Smögen Island, which is nearby. Designed largely by Pär Caldenby the distillery has a 900-litre wash still, a 600-litre spirit still, and a production capacity of 35000 litres. The first bottling, of a three-year-old cask strength single malt whisky, took place in 2013. The whisky, "Smögen Primör", won a silver medal at the 2014 Stockholm Beer and Whisky Festival.

In 2014 the distillery commenced production of "Strane London Dry Gin". Strane London Dry Gin Uncut Strength at 76% vol. was the strongest gin available from 2015 to 2017. In July 2018 the distillery released Strane Ultra Uncut Gin at 82.5%, to reclaim the record for the strongest gin In August 2014 the distillery wrote an open letter to the Minister for Rural Affairs Eskil Erlandsson (who attended the distillery's opening in 2010, together with County Governor Lars Bäckström) and Systembolaget, complaining about the government's management of the alcohol industry.
