= Compass Box =

Whisky producer

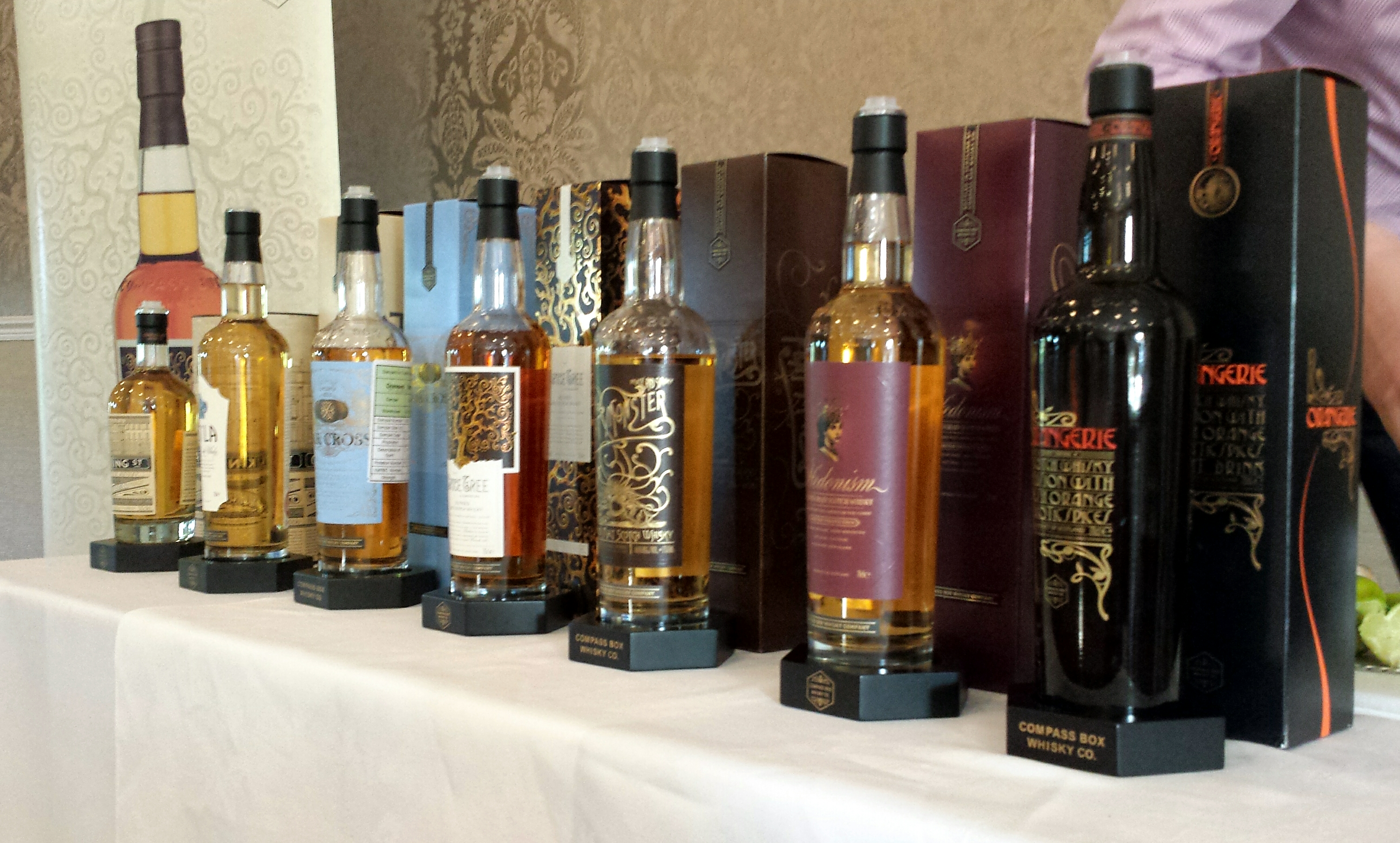
Compass Box whiskies

Compass Box is a producer, bottler and marketer of a range of blended Scotch whiskies. The company is headquartered in Richmond. Compass Box Whisky was founded in 2000 by American entrepreneur John Glaser, a former marketing director at Johnnie Walker. The current blending team at Compass Box is headed up by James Saxon as whiskymaking director

The company's whiskymakers select distillates from a number of existing Scotch whisky distilleries, with the selected whiskies then being blended together and the resulting blend matured further.

== Products ==
Compass Box's main product line, called the Signature Range, consists of the following:

- Blended Malts:
  - Orchard House
  - Peat Monster
  - The Spaniard
  - Spice Tree
- Blended Scotch:
  - Artist Blend
  - Glasgow Blend
- Blended Grain:
  - Hedonism

Compass Box has sold Limited Edition whiskies such as 'Art & Decadence', 'Optimism', 'The General', 'The Lost Blend', 'Morpheus', the 'Canto Cask' series and the three-bottle 'Myths and Legends'. Compass Box has worked with restaurants, bars, and bartenders to produce the range. 'Juveniles' was blended with restaurateur Tim Johnston to favour the tastes of the classic French cuisine of Parisian bistro Juveniles Bistrot à Vins. 'Delilah's' was created in partnership with Chicago punk bar owner Mike Miller. London bartender Rosey Mitchell created 'The Circle' with Compass Box whisky makers. To celebrate the 20th anniversary, Compass Box has released a limited cask strength variant of the Compass Box Peat Monster in April 2023.

=== The Extinct Blends Quartet ===
The Extinct Blends Quartet was created to pay homage to some of the blending team's favorite blends that have continued to hold historic importance and inspire fans to the heights of blended Scotch whisky. Fashions change, and formulae follow suit. Blended whiskies of the 1970s, '80s and '90s are very different to today's versions, even when the brand name remains the same. The Extinct Blends Quartet, as it unfolds, reimagines four blended Scotches from yesteryear, using some of the company's rarest and most idiosyncratic stocks of whisky.

The first three expressions of the series (Ultramarine, Delos and Metropolis) were released between 2022 and 2023.The fourth and final bottle, Celestial, in 2024.

=== Other Products ===
Apart from whiskies, Compass Box also produced 'Orangerie', made from whisky infused with orange zest and spices.

== Contravention of Scotch Whisky Association regulations ==
In 2005 Compass Box released a Blended Malt Scotch Whisky called The Spice Tree in which the blend of single malt distillates had undergone a secondary partial maturation stage in casks containing additional, flat French oak inserts (also known as ‘inner staves’). The Scotch Whisky Association, a trade organisation that represents the Scotch whisky industry, felt that the use of such inner staves in the whisky maturation process was in contravention of the Scotch Whisky Regulations prevailing at the time and threatened legal action against Compass Box if they did not halt production. In response, Compass Box altered the production process for subsequent releases, by having the secondary maturation stage take place in casks containing toasted French oak heads instead of the flat oak inner staves.

More recently, in 2015 Compass Box again disagreed with the Scotch Whisky Association when attempting to release complete information about every component whisky used in its blends, a step which the Scotch Whisky Association claimed was prohibited by both EU and UK laws. In response, Compass Box launched a 'Scotch Whisky Transparency' campaign to encourage greater transparency within the world of Scotch with other Scotch whisky producers – notably Bruichladdich – subsequently joined them in sharing full age component information about one or more of their blends.

== Selected awards ==
- 2023: Compass Box Scotch Whiskymaker: The world's Fifth Most Admired Whisky, Drinks International
- 2023: Glasgow Blend: Gold, World Whiskies Awards
- 2023: The Spice Tree: Silver, World Whiskies Awards
- 2023: Hedonism: Silver, World Whiskies Awards
- 2022: Orchard House: Gold, world Whiskies Awards
- 2021: Hedonism: Gold, World Whiskies Awards
- 2021: Rogues' Banquet: Category Winner, World Whiskies Awards
- 2021: The Peat Monster: Bronze, World Whiskies Awards
- 2021: The Spice Tree: Silver, World Whiskies Awards
- 2020: The Spice Tree, Gold Winner, Blended Malt, World Whiskies Awards
- 2020: The Peat Monster, Category Winner, No Age Statement, World Whiskies Awards
- 2020: The Spice Tree, No Age Statement, Gold Winner, World Whiskies Awards
- 2019: Great King Street, Gold, Blended Malt - Super Premium, The Scotch Whisky Masters
- 2018: Glasgow Blend, Gold, Blended: Premium, International Sprits Challenge
- 2016: Flaming Heart. Scotch Vatted Malt of the Year, Jim Murray's Whisky Bible
- 2015: The Spice Tree, Best Blended Malt Scotch Whisky, San Francisco World Spirits Championship
- 2014: Delilah's, Most Innovative New Whisky of 2014, The Drammie Awards
- 2014: The Peat Monster, Scotch Blended Malt of the Year, World Whiskies Awards
- 2011: The Spice Tree, Winner of 'Best Scotch New Brand', Jim Murray's Whisky Bible 2011
- 2011: Flaming Heart, Winner of 'Scotch Whisky Blend of the Year', Malt Advocate Whisky Awards
- 2011: Flaming Heart (10th Anniversary bottling), Selected in Malt Advocate Whisky Awards 'Top Ten New Whiskies'
- 2010: Gregg Glass, Shortlisted for 'Young Whisky Ambassador of the Year Icon', Whisky Magazine's Icons of Whisky Awards
- 2010: The Peat Monster, Winner of 'Scotch Whisky Blend of the Year', Malt Advocate Whisky Awards
- 2009: Hedonism, Winner of 'World's Best Grain Whisky', World Whiskies Awards
- 2009: Hedonism, Category Winner of 'World's Best Blended Grain Whisky', World Whiskies Awards
- 2008: The Peat Monster, Category Winner of 'World's Best Scotch Blended Malt', World Whiskies Awards
- 2008: Hedonism, Winner of 'World's Best Grain Whisky', World Whiskies Awards
- 2008: Morpheus, Sub-Category Winner of 'Scotch Blended Malt no age', World Whiskies Awards
- 2007: Compass Box Whisky, Winner of 'Innovator of the Year', Whisky Magazine's Icons of Whisky Awards
