= Samuel Dow =

Samuel Dow Limited was a wine merchants and whisky bonders based in Glasgow, Scotland. The company was known for its range of blended scotch whiskies and its Public houses around the city of Glasgow.

== History ==
Samuel Dow Limited was established in 1807 by Samuel McCalman/Dow from Lochaber. He opened a very small bar at 45 King Street/Bridgegate in central Glasgow.

The company became well known in 19th century Glasgow, and it was the third generation Samuel Dow, who developed the business. In 1881 he opened a bar at 226 Great Western Road. In 1896 the company headquarters moved to 242 Clyde Street from 54 to 58 Mitchell Street. From these premises various blends of scotch whisky were produced and exported worldwide. In 1899 the company also had a public house at 1157–1159 Pollokshaws Road.

In 1931 Samuel Dow took over a bar at 67–71 Nithsdale Road in Pollokshaws. The company also operated a public house at 9–11 Dundas Street near Glasgow Queen Street railway station. As of 2016, the bar in Dundas Street retained Samuel Dow's name with the bar in Nithsdale Road having changed hands (and name) in 2015.

Whisky blends included Sam'l Dow's specially selected blended scotch whisky and Dow's Pigeon Blend which was known for its distinctive white pigeon logo. Other blends included McAndrew's, which was also produced and bottled in Glasgow. Occasionally, bottles of Samuel Dow whisky become available to purchase, and are considered to be collector's items.

John Archibald Dow was the fourth generation of the Samuel Dow dynasty and he had three children. Samuel Dow (1908–1976) was educated at the High School of Glasgow and Strathallan School in Perthshire. Samuel held several important offices including, president of the Wine and Spirit Trade Association from 1964 to 1965, Master of The Worshipful Company of Vintners in 1971 and chairman of the Scottish Wholesalers Wine Merchants Association from 1953 to 1957.

James was educated at Strathallan School, St Johns Cambridge, and Middlesex Hospital Medical School.

John (Alastair) Alexander Dow was educated at Strathallan School and graduated from St John's College, Cambridge in 1939. He served as a lieutenant with the Royal Naval Volunteer Reserve during World War II around the English Channel and Western Approaches. As with Samuel he became president of the Scottish Wine and Spirit Merchants' Benevolent Institution.

In 1965 Samuel Dow Limited, and four of its associated companies, were bought by another Glasgow wine and spirit merchant, David Sandeman and Son Limited, who were founded in 1821. Both Samuel Dow and Alastair Dow continued as directors. The whisky interests of both companies were merged, enabling further expansion of the business. David Sandeman and Son Limited was bought by Allied Breweries in 1970. The Samuel Dow public houses came under the control of Ind Coope (Scotland), a subsidiary of Allied Breweries. The deal enabled Ind Coope to expand their portfolio of public houses and hotels.
