= Rowson's Reserve =

Brand of Indian whisky

- Type: Indian whisky
- Manufacturer: Diageo
- Origin: India
- Introduced: 3 October 2011
- Alcohol by volume: 42.8%
- Ingredients: Indian grain whisky, Scotch whisky
- Related products: Johnnie Walker; Vat 69; Black & White

Rowson's Reserve is a brand of Indian whisky, owned by Diageo, and launched on 3 October 2011. It is a blend of Indian grain whisky and aged Scotch whisky.

Rowson's Reserve's main competitors are Pernod Ricard's Blenders Pride and United Spirits Limited's Signature.

== History ==
Rowson's Reserve was launched on 3 October 2011 in Maharashtra, Haryana, Punjab and Karnataka. The launch marked Diageo's return to the Indian Made Foreign Liquor (IMFL) market, in which it had been inactive since 2002.
