= Adelphi distillery =

Scotch whisky distillery

Coordinates: 55.852597°N 4.251844°W

Region: Lowland
- Location: Glasgow, Scotland
- Founded: 1826
- Status: Closed/demolished
- Capacity: 2,350,000 L
- Demolished: 1970

Adelphi distillery was a Scotch whisky distillery, which was founded in 1826 in Glasgow and closed in 1907. The name was revived in 1993, for an independent bottler of Scotch whisky.

== Adelphi distillery ==
The Adelphi Distillery was founded in 1826 by brothers Charles and David Gray. It was sited just south of the Victoria Bridge, at the edge of the Gorbals area of Glasgow. The distillery was operated by the Gray family until 1880, when it was acquired by Messrs A. Walker and Co, a company who already owned large distilleries in Limerick and Liverpool. The Walkers invested in the distillery and added a Coffey still with which to distil grain spirit. By 1886, there were four pot stills and the Coffey still in full production. The distillery had an output of 516,000 imperial gallons (2,350,000 L) of pure alcohol per year. The Adelphi distillery was purchased by Distillers Company (DCL) in 1902, and by 1907 distilling had been stopped completely. The buildings of the distillery were demolished between 1968 and 1970, and the chimney was dismantled in 1971.

== Independent bottler ==
The great-grandson of one of the distillery's founders, Jamie Walker, established the modern day Adelphi independent bottler in 1993, selling the company to Keith Falconer and Donald Houston in 2004. Whiskies are selected by a nosing team chaired by whisky critic Charles MacLean.

== Ardnamurchan Distillery ==
Ardnamurchan distillery is a Scotch whisky distillery owned by Adelphi on the Ardnamurchan peninsula of Lochaber in the Highlands, Scotland.

== See also ==
- List of historic whisky distilleries
