= Kinclaith distillery =

Whisky distillery in Glasgow City, Scotland

Coordinates: 55°50′54″N 04°14′27″W

Region: Lowland
- Location: Glasgow, Scotland, UK
- Owner: Chivas Brothers
- Founded: 1957
- Status: Closed/demolished
- Water source: Loch Katrine
- Demolished: 1975

Kinclaith distillery was a Lowland single malt Scotch whisky distillery in Glasgow, Scotland.

== History ==
Kinclaith distillery was built by Strathclyde & Long John Distilleries Ltd. within the Strathclyde distillery complex, in 1958. The Kinclaith distillery was closed in 1975 after being sold to Whitbread & Co a company later sold to Allied Domecq .

Following the closure of the still, the stock, casked and bottled, has become rare, making it more collectable and the value has increased substantially.

The brand is now owned by Chivas Brothers.
