= Dunville & Co =

Northern Ireland tea and spirits merchant

Dunville & Co. was a tea and spirits merchant company, based in Belfast, County Antrim. The company initially gained success as a Northern Irish whiskey blender, but later produced and marketed its own whiskey, having constructed its own distillery. The company was founded by John Dunvill who joined William Napier of Napier & Co. When John Dunvill bought William Napper out he changed the spelling of Dunvill to Dunville and in 1825 the company name became Dunville & Co. In 1837, Dunville began producing its most popular whisky Dunville's VR.

== The Royal Irish Distilleries ==
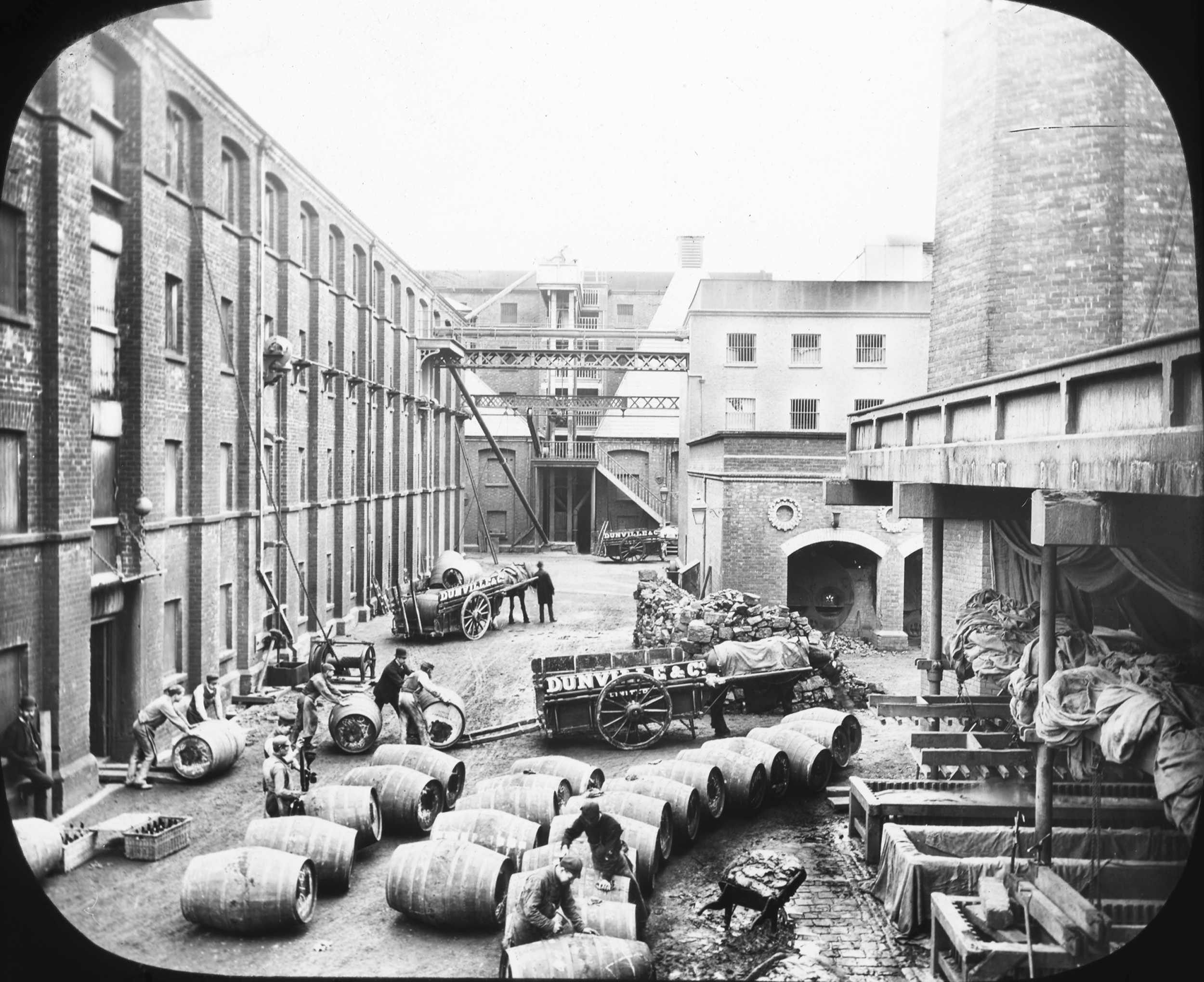
View of the distillery, circa 1893–1913

Having gained success as a whiskey blender, Dunville & Co. constructed their own distillery, the Royal Irish Distilleries, on the edge of Belfast in 1869. When built, the distillery occupied an impressive four-storey red-brick building, and was amongst the most modern in Ireland. With production from five pot stills, and later a Coffey still, at its peak the distillery had a capacity of over 2.5 million gallons per annum, making it amongst the largest in the country. Much of the distillery's output was used in the company's whiskey blends, Dunville's VR and Dunville's Three Crowns.

Although, like other Irish distilleries, Prohibition caused Dunville to lose access to the important American market, Dunville ended the 1920s in good financial health. However, when the last heir and chairman of Dunville, Robert Lambart Dunville, died in 1931, the company began to flounder, and left to its directors, in 1936 Dunville & Co. was liquidated. Almost uniquely amongst the Irish distilleries that closed in the 20th century, liquidation was not forced upon the firm, as Dunville was actually still profitable when it was wound up.

== Dunville's Whiskey ==
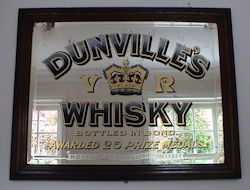

Dunville's Whisky was the main brand name of Dunville & Co, and was used in advertisements, on pub windows and pub mirrors, and on whisky dispensers, water jugs, trays, match strikers, ash trays and playing cards. Although Dunville & Co was established and based in Ireland, before the Partition of Ireland, and Irish whiskey is normally spelt with an 'e' in 'whiskey', Dunville's Whisky was always spelt without an 'e' in 'Whisky'.

== Products ==
- Dunville's VR
- Dunville's Three Crowns

== Revival ==
In 2013, almost 80 years after the last Dunville's was distilled, the Echlinville Distillery revived the Dunville's brand, and began distilling at their facility in the Ards Peninsula. Previously they had purchased spirits from other distillers and aged it themselves. Dunville's VR Old Irish Whiskey and Dunville's Three Crowns Irish Whiskey from the Echlinville Distillery came on the market in 2016.

== Chairmen ==
- John Dumville (Dunville), Founder (1801–1851)
- William Dunville (1851–1874)
- Robert Grimshaw Dunville (1874–1910)
- John Dunville Dunville (1910–1929)
- Robert Lambart Dunville (1929–1931)
- Board of Directors

== John Spencer Dunville ==
John Spencer Dunville VC was the second son of the fourth chairman, John Dunville Dunville (1866–1929). John Spencer Dunville was wounded in action near Épehy in northern France on 25 June 1917, and died from his wounds the next day, 26 June 1917. He was posthumously awarded the Victoria Cross for his actions.

== The Distillery Football Club ==
The Distillery Football Club was formed in 1880. The Directors of Dunville & Co. gave the football club their support and filled in a waste pond at the back of the distillery to create the club's first football ground.

The football club has continued to thrive long after the closing of the distillery company. It changed its name in 1999 to Lisburn Distillery, after the location of its current home ground in Northern Ireland. Known affectionately as "The Whites", the club provides football for all ages from 8 years old up to senior football.

Its current shirt sponsor is the Echlinville Distillery, who have resumed the production of Dunville's Whiskey. So once again the football club is associated with the Dunville name.
