= Strathclyde distillery =

Whisky distillery in Glasgow, Scotland

Coordinates: 55.8488°N 4.241°W

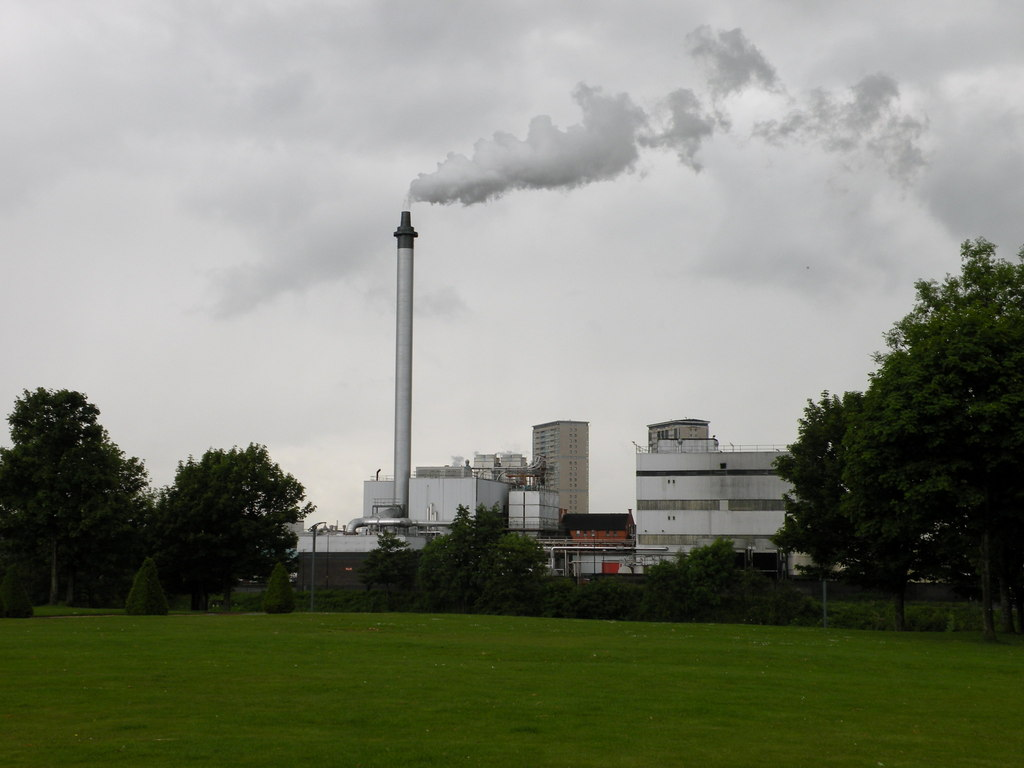
- Location: Glasgow, Scotland
- Owner: Pernod Ricard
- Founded: 1927
- Status: Producing
- Water source: Loch Katrine
- No. of stills: 2 column stills
- Capacity: 40,000,000 L

Strathclyde distillery is a grain spirit distillery producing PBS (Plain British Spirit) that will make grain whisky after maturation, located in the Gorbals district of Glasgow, Scotland.

== History ==
The distillery was founded in 1927 by Seager Evans and Co. The first spirit was produced in 1928.

The company was acquired by Schenley Industries of New York in 1956, who invested heavily in the site, including the addition of a Single malt whisky branded Kinclaith, which started producing in 1958. The Kinclaith still was closed in 1975 after the site was acquired by Whitbread.

Today the distillery is part of the Pernod Ricard group.

== Production ==
The water required for the production comes from Loch Katrine. Distillation takes in a 2 column system which has an analyser column and a rectifier column, the columns for neutral production are mothballed.

== Bottling ==
The grain whisky produced at Strathclyde is intended for developing blends, and as such there is no official bottling. However, the Scotch Malt Whisky Society and other independent bottlers have purchased and bottled some aged casks of this as Single Cask Single Grain whisky.
