= Dunville's VR =

VR
- Type: Irish Whiskey
- Manufacturer: Dunville & Co
- Origin: Belfast
- Introduced: 1837
- Discontinued: 1936
- Proof (US): 40
- Related products: Dunville's VR

Dunville's VR was a rare pure pot still whiskey distilled by Dunville & Co at the Royal Irish Distillery in Belfast. It was younger and less expensive than Dunville's other whiskey Dunville's Three Crowns.

== The Echlinville Distillery ==
Dunville's VR Old Irish Whiskey and Dunville's Three Crowns Irish Whiskey are now being produced at the Echlinville Distillery in Kircubbin, County Down, and came on the market in 2016.
