= McClelland's Single Malt =

McClelland's Single Malt is a range of single malt Scotch whiskies from four of Scotland's key whisky distilling regions—Highland, Islay, Speyside and Lowland.

There is no McClelland's distillery per se, with the scotch being supplied by McClelland's parent company Morrison Bowmore Distillers. The Highland, Islay, and Lowland bottlings were introduced in 1986, with Speyside added in 1999. While most of the McClelland's bottlings do not specify an age, the brand added a second Speyside bottling with a listed age of 12 years in 2008.

The packaging of McClelland's was updated in 2007 by Nevis Design of Edinburgh to support the expansion of the brand worldwide. It now features Scottish imagery by British artist Kathy Wyatt. Incorporated in the imagery is the character "Mr. McClelland", a fictional 1920s explorer making his way around Scotland taking in the sights, sounds and drams as he goes. He reports back in blog format on the McClelland's website.

McClelland's key markets include the United States of America, Canada, Japan, and France, with new markets in South Africa, the UK, Taiwan, South America, and Sweden.

== Bottlings ==
McClelland’s bottlings include their Highland, Islay, Lowland, Speyside, and Speyside 12YO.

McClelland's also sells their range as 5cl miniatures—both separately and in the McClelland's Journey Tin, a gift pack of four 5cl miniatures with a tasting guide.

== History ==
T&A McClelland’s was a Glasgow based whisky blending and export firm established in 1818. The company was purchased in 1970 by what became Morrison Bowmore Distillers Ltd., now a division of Suntory. MBD Ltd. continues to produce a number of their original blends along with the newer single malt offerings.

== Morrison Bowmore distilleries ==
Scotch distilleries owned by Morrison Bowmore include:

- Auchentoshan (Lowland)
- Bowmore (Islay)
- Glen Garioch (Highland)
