= Heaven Hill Kentucky Whiskey =

Heaven Hill Kentucky Blended Whiskey
- Heaven Hill Kentucky Blended Whiskey
- Type: Blended whiskey
- Manufacturer: Heaven Hill
- Origin: Kentucky, United States
- Alcohol by volume: 40%
- Proof (US): 80
- Related products: Heaven Hill

Heaven Hill Kentucky Whiskey is an American blended whiskey produced in Bardstown, Kentucky by Heaven Hill Distilleries. The company sells a variety of blended whiskeys and straight bourbons in 16 oz (1 pint), 750ml, and 1-liter glass bottles, and in 1.75L plastic bottles.

== Blended whiskey ==
Unlike Heaven Hill Bourbon, which is a 100% straight bourbon and can only be made with uncut natural ingredients that include corn, malted barley and rye, Heaven Hill blended whiskeys can employ a less expensive and wider range of ingredients and production methods. In fact, Heaven Hill Kentucky Whiskey is only 20% straight bourbon and 80% neutral grain spirits (similar to grain alcohol with no color or smell). Neutral grain spirits can be aged in used oak barrels or not aged at all, while "straight" bourbon must be aged a minimum of two years in newly charred oak barrels and must not be distilled to such a high level of alcohol content that the flavor of the original mash is removed.

Heaven Hill Distilleries also produces five other blended whiskies: Gukenheimer, Kentucky Deluxe, Kentucky Beau, T. W. Samuels and Wilson.

== Reviews ==
Food critic Morgan Murphy said "This bourbon's strong fruit notes and mellow oaks make it seem like a much pricier bottle."
