= Bulleit Bourbon =

Brand of Kentucky straight bourbon whiskey

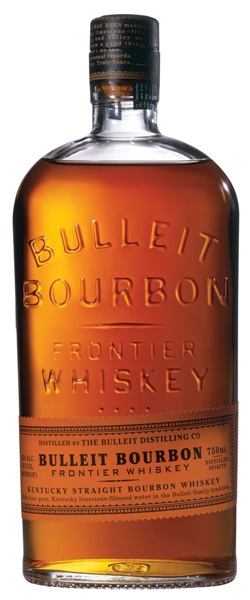
- Bottle of Bulleit Bourbon
- Type: Bourbon whiskey
- Manufacturer: Diageo
- Origin: United States
- Introduced: 1830; 1995
- Alcohol by volume: 45%
- Proof (US): 90
- Color: Russet (dark brown)
- Website: bulleit.com

Bulleit Bourbon is a brand of Kentucky straight bourbon whiskey produced at the Bulleit Distillery in Shelbyville, Kentucky and the Bulleit Distillery in Lebanon, Kentucky by the Diageo beverage company.

It is characterized by a high rye content for a bourbon (at approximately 28% of the mash bill) and being aged at least six years. It is bottled at 45% abv (90 proof) for the US, Canadian, British, Dutch and Mexican markets. For Australian and Danish markets, it is bottled at 40% abv. It is also sold in Germany, Norway and Sweden.

In the U.S. and other markets, Bulleit also offers a rye whiskey.

== History ==
According to Tom Bulleit, son of a preacher, great-great-grandson of original creator Augustus Bulleit and developer of the modern brand, the first batch of Bulleit bourbon was made around 1830. Augustus continued to produce it up until his death in 1860. The current recipe follows the original mash bill produced by Augustus Bulleit, which used two-thirds corn and one-third rye. As implemented today, Bulleit Bourbon is 68% corn, 28% rye and 4% malted barley.

Tom Bulleit began distilling his version of Bulleit bourbon in 1987, with the whiskey first commercial produced under a 4,000-case contract distillation run at Frankfort's Leestown Company Distillery (now Buffalo Trace Distillery) in 1989. After aging, it first reached retail stores in the summer of 1995.

Seagram bought the Bulleit brand in 1997 and began distilling it in Lawrenceburg, Kentucky.

The brand was widely introduced to Australia, UK and Germany in 2000.

Diageo acquired various Seagram's assets, including the Bulleit brand, which was then produced by its subsidiary Kirin Brewing Company at the same Lawrenceburg plant.

On March 14, 2017, Diageo opened a new Bulleit distillery. The 300-acre (120 ha) $115 million facility is located just east of Shelbyville in Shelby County, Kentucky.

In June 2019, Bulleit opened its visitors' center at its Shelbyville distillery in Kentucky. The Visitor Experience includes guided tours, a cocktail bar and an opportunity for visitors 21 years or older to design a customized Bulleit label to apply to their own bottles.

=== Bulleit family dispute ===
Tom Bulleit's daughter Hollis left her position at Diageo in 2017 after 10 years, claiming she was being pushed out because she was a lesbian. A spokesperson from Diageo denies the claim.

== Products ==
The current Bulleit bourbon whiskey mash bill contains 68% corn (maize), 28% rye, and 4% malted barley. It is bottled at 45% ABV.

Bulleit Bourbon Barrel Strength is a blend of barrels which are 5 to 8 years old. As it is being bottled straight from the barrel the proof varies by batch, ranging from 118 to 125 (59 to 62.5 ABV).

Bulleit Bourbon 10 Year is the only age dated Bulleit whiskey. It is bottled at 91.2 U.S. proof and has the same mash bill as the original Bulleit Bourbon. It won a Double Gold Medal at the 2013 San Francisco World Spirits Competition.

Bulleit rye whiskey, introduced in March 2011, has a mash bill of 95% rye and 5% malted barley. It is produced in Lawrenceburg, Indiana by MGP Ingredients and bottled at 45% abv.

Bottled-in-Bond Bourbon In 2025, Bulleit Frontier Whiskey released its first-ever Bottled-in-Bond Bourbon, aged for seven years and distilled and aged entirely at the Bulleit Distilling Company in Shelbyville, Kentucky. This was a limited-time release, and Bulleit stated it will be available in the future only when the blending team determines it meets high standards of quality and character.

Bulleit '87 In 2026, Bulleit announced Bulleit '87, its first whiskey combining bourbon and rye and a new permanent core expression. It blends bourbon distilled and aged in Shelbyville, Kentucky, with rye distilled and aged in Indiana. Both components are aged for at least four years and separately finished for four to six weeks with toasted American oak and French oak staves before blending. Bottled at 90 proof (45% ABV), Bulleit '87 was scheduled to become available nationwide beginning in September 2026.

=== In Australia and the UK ===
Starting in 2008, Bulleit bourbon sold on the UK market is bottled at 40% alcohol by volume, which is re-exported to the Australia market. A 45% ABV version was introduced to the UK market in late 2014, under the label "Bulleit Frontier Whiskey".

== Distilleries ==
Bulleit Shelbyville Distillery 3464 Benson Pike, Shelbyville, KY 40065

Bulleit Lebanon Distillery 100 Bourbon Drive, Lebanon, KY, 40033

== Reviews ==
Proof66.com, a review aggregator for spirits, rates Bulleit bourbon in the top 10th percentile of the world's best whiskeys. The Bulleit Rye Whiskey is also rated a "Top Tier Whiskey". Proof66.com rates Bulleit Bourbon 10 Year as a "Tier 1" spirit with an overall rating of 551/904.

Bulleit Bourbon 10 Year received a gold medal in the Small Batch Bourbon up to 10 yrs category at the 2013 San Francisco World Spirits Competition.

Food critic Morgan Murphy said "This amber beauty, with its notes of spice, rye, and cedar, packs a stronger bite than its sweet aroma would imply."
