= Ardnamurchan distillery =

Whisky distillery in Scotland, UK

Coordinates: 56.6920°N 5.9396°W

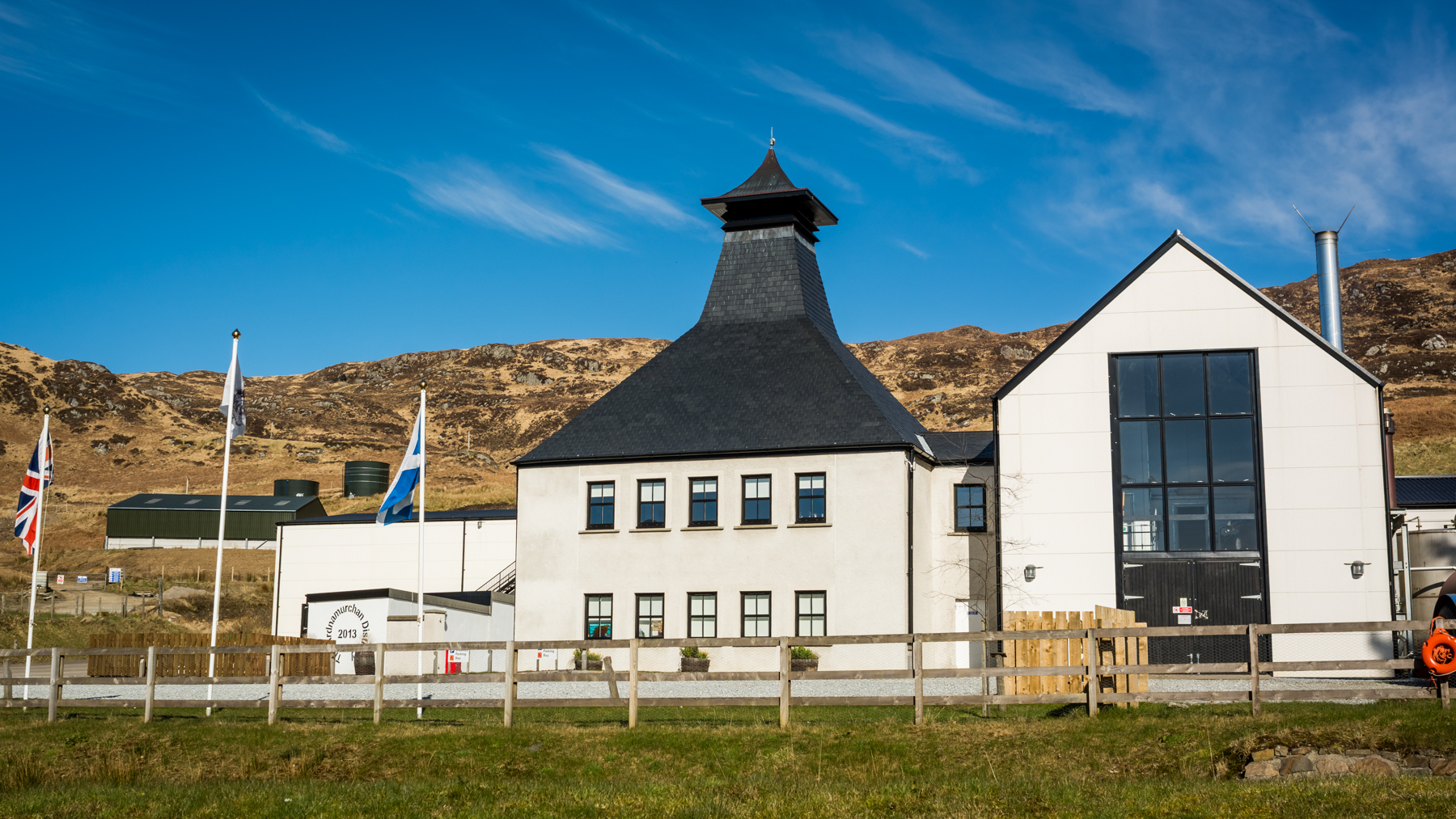

Region: Highland
- Location: Ardnamurchan
- Owner: Adelphi
- Founded: 2014
- Water source: Glenmore River and springs above the distillery
- No. of stills: 1 wash still 1 spirit still
- Capacity: 500,000 L

Ardnamurchan distillery is a Scotch whisky distillery on the Ardnamurchan peninsula of Lochaber in the Highlands, Scotland. The distillery is considered one of the remotest distilleries in Scotland and takes its name from the peninsula.

The distillery was built and is owned by Adelphi, an independent bottling company.

== History ==
Plans for the distillery were submitted in 2011 and approved by the local council in April 2012. The construction began in 2013 and the distillery was completed in May 2014.

Ardnamurchan commenced production in 2014. The first official whisky of the distillery (meeting the 3-year statutory requirements) was released in 2017.

In 2018, local children were given a charitable gift of Ardnamurchan whisky casks as an investment.

As of 2020, the distillery had filled over 10,000 casks.

== Facilities ==
The distillery is powered by renewable energy to reduce the carbon footprint of the distillery. It is powered by both hydro-electric power and a large bio-mass boiler using timber from the nearby Ardnamurchan forest. The boiler provides heat to the distillery floor maltings.

The distillery draws the water for its whisky production from springs above the distillery and uses the nearby Glenmore river as a source for cooling water.

== Products ==
The distillery produces two styles, peated and unpeated West Highland whiskies.
