= Hamilton Distillers =

Arizona based company

Whiskey Del Bac
- Type: Single Malt whiskey
- Manufacturer: Hamilton Distillers
- Distributor: Quench
- Origin: United States
- Introduced: 2014
- Alcohol by volume: 45.00%
- Proof (US): 90 (U.S.)
- Variants: Old Pueblo, Classic, Dorado
- Related products: Whiskey Del Bac

Hamilton Distillers, Inc. is a private family-owned and operated distillery company, founded by Stephen Paul in 2006, headquartered in Tucson, Arizona. The company produces and markets three Single Malt Whiskey Del Bac labels. Its current distillery facility, called Hamilton Distillers, is located in west Tucson, Arizona. Hamilton is the first craft distillery established in Southern Arizona since prohibition and the largest whiskey producer in the Tucson metro region.

== History ==
The Hamilton Distillers concept was developed by American wood worker Stephen Paul and his daughter Amanda Paul in 2006. In the mid 1980s the Paul's opened a boutique furniture company Arroyo Design. The Hamilton Distillers product grew out of the use of mesquite and was developed to capture the unique taste of this arid climate tree and the Sonoran Desert. Each of the three inaugural Hamilton Whiskey products share the name Del Bac with the Spanish Colonial Mission San Xavier del Bac founded in 1692 by Padre Eusebio Kino, outside of current day Tucson. Del Bac is the physical location near Tucson. In 2015 Hamilton Distillers was named by Playboy magazine as Arizona's best spirit.

The Master Distillers of Hamilton since its founding have been Paul joined in 2013 by Nathan Thompson-Avolino.

== Product description ==
=== Distillation and aging ===
Del Bac is a single malt whiskey, aged in charred new American oak barrels. Unlike traditional peated Scotch, the Sonoran Desert product is malted over mesquite instead of peat.

=== Packaging ===
Each bottle is bottled by hand, with each label hand-signed by the distiller. The bottling process is done by volunteers, who receive a free bottle of Whiskey Del Bac upon completion of the bottling crew. Requests to volunteer are available on Whiskey Del Bac's website. The bottle features hand letterpress label printed on a Chandler & Price press with gold foil and features a 19th century etching of a giant saguaro cactus.

== Products ==
- Whiskey Del Bac Old Pueblo
- Whiskey Del Bac Classic
- Whiskey Del Bac Dorado
