= Ancient Age (bourbon) =

Brand of whiskey distilled in Kentucky

Ancient Age Bourbon whiskey
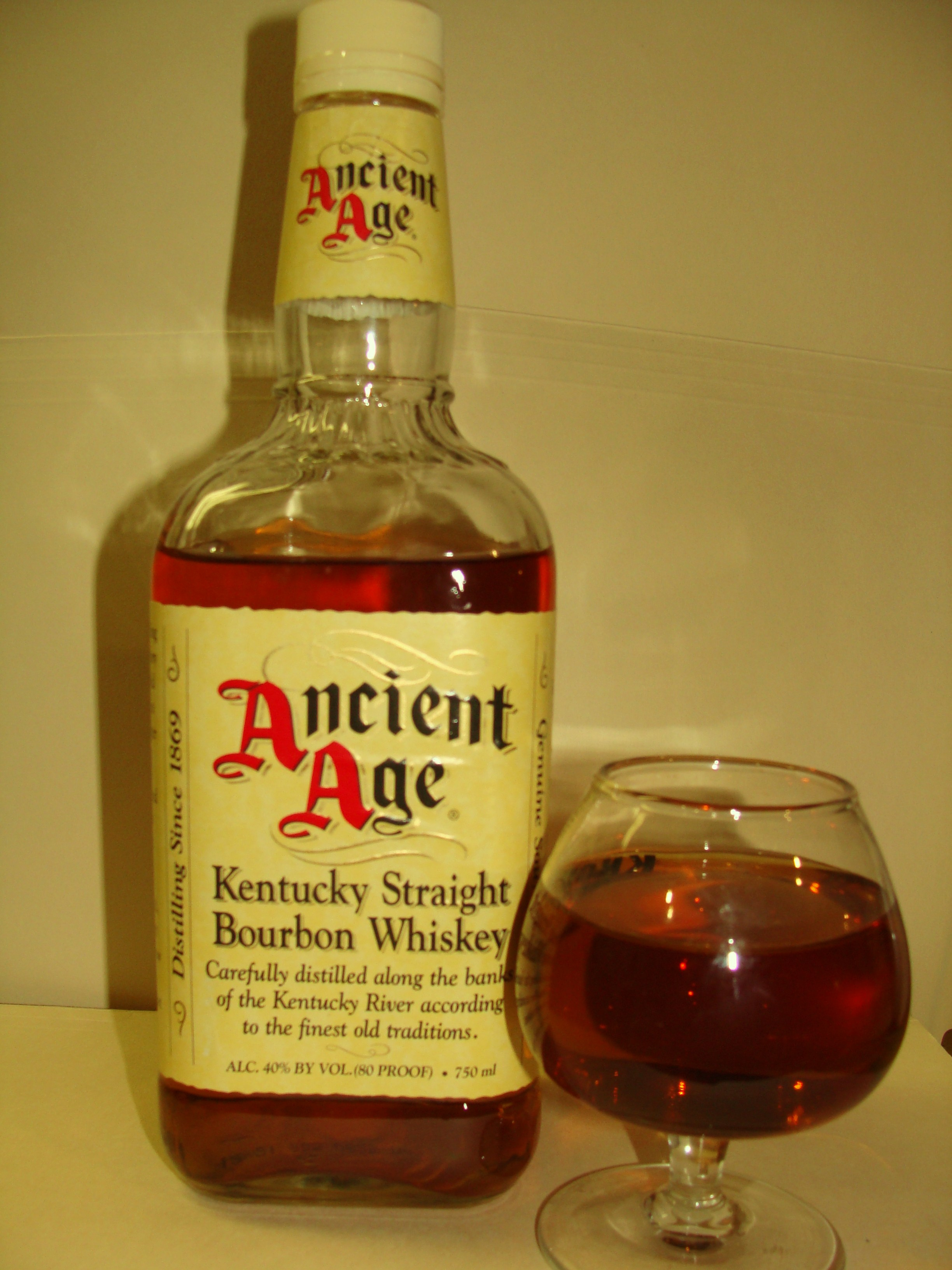
- Bottle and glass of Ancient Age
- Type: Bourbon whiskey
- Manufacturer: Sazerac Company
- Origin: Kentucky, United States
- Alcohol by volume: 40.00%
- Proof (US): 80
- Related products: Buffalo Trace

Ancient Age is a brand of bourbon whiskey distilled in Frankfort, Kentucky, at the Buffalo Trace Distillery.

== History ==
In 1983 the Ancient Age brand was sold by Schenley to Age International. Its logo was designed by Paul Rand.

== Current products ==
- Ancient Age is a 36-month-old bourbon, bottled at 80 proof.
- Ancient Age 90 is a variation of the traditional 36-month old bourbon, bottled at 90 proof.
- Ancient Ancient Age 10 Star is bottled at 90 proof.

The product line also includes Ancient Age Preferred blended whiskey, bottled at 80 proof.

== Review ==
About some variation of the brand, food critic Morgan Murphy said "The finish leapfrogs the tongue and goes straight to the throat."

== In popular culture ==
Ancient Age is referred to several times in the novella Apt Pupil by Stephen King. Ancient Age is the brand of bourbon drunk by James Stewart’s and Arthur O'Connell’s characters in Otto Preminger's 1959 film Anatomy of a Murder.
