= Chicken Cock Whiskey =

Historic whiskey brand

Chicken Cock Whiskey is a historic brand of bourbon having origins rooted in Bourbon County farm distilling.

James A. Miller began distilling as early as the 1830s. The brand was established soon after the Bourbon Distillery was built in 1856. Known throughout the late 19th century as James A. Miller's Chicken Cock, the brand would grow a solid reputation nationally and advertised itself as "The Famous Old Brand". Chicken Cock survived imitators, the Whiskey Trust, and Prohibition, only to fade from the market after World War II.

The brand was rediscovered in 2011 by spirits entrepreneur Matti Anttila, and reintroduced in 2014 by Grain and Barrel Spirits, which produces a variety of bourbons, ryes, and limited releases distilled at Bardstown Bourbon Company in Bardstown, Kentucky.

== History ==
In 1837, James A. Miller leased a farm off of Ruddles Mill Road in Bourbon County and began distilling whiskey. He promoted his copper-distilled Miller's Pure Old Bourbon Whiskey both by making an annual pilgrimage to New Orleans.

In November 1856, Miller purchased three acres of land on Stoner Creek in Bourbon County from a Cincinnati land speculator named David Gibson and his wife Sarah for $1,600 and an additional lot owned by Noah and Margaret Spears for $150. By January 1857, the Louisville-Courier-Journal was proclaiming Paris, Kentucky, as "the capital of the bourbon nation" and announced "Mr. James A. Miller, whose name is known wherever spirits are held in good repute, has erected a new distillery, that will manufacture daily thirty five barrels of the genuine oily old fashioned 'Bourbon'." It was completed at a reported cost of $75,000.

To maximize his production output, in January 1857 Miller advertised a need for 2,500 hogs, corn, wheat, and rye, from local sources. He called his establishment The Bourbon Distillery and continued to acquire more land along the stone fence along the Lexington-Maysville Turnpike.

Several tragedies befell the distiller, including a loss of two to three hundred hogs due to a cholera outbreak and 475 barrels of uninsured bourbon when the merchant vessel A.O. Tylor ran aground on the Ohio River. In 1860, James A. Miller died at 42 from undocumented circumstances. His family heirs put The Bourbon Distillery up for auction.

=== Tarr & White ===
In September 1860, Thomas P. Smith, Master Commissioner of the Bourbon County Circuit Court, auctioned off the Bourbon Distillery to local land speculator William Tarr. Tarr could not finance the purchase on his own and was given four years to raise the money. Meanwhile, James' brother Joseph would handle the affairs of the distillery. It is during this time that advertisements began referring to the distillery's flagship product as Miller's celebrated Old Chicken Cock Whiskey.

The Title Deed for the Bourbon Distillery, and adjoining property near Stoner Creek was executed on April 23, 1864. William Tarr would bring Miller's bookkeeper George G. White in on the deal and they paid Miller's heirs $14,845 for the property. By January 1866, Tarr & White would be the richest men in Bourbon County.

During their four years together, they would stretch the distribution of the brand all the way to San Francisco, California, more than doubled the output of their nearest Bourbon County competitor in 1868, and boasted the only Class A Bonded warehouse.

=== White & Alexander ===
In September 1868, William Tarr sold his half of the business to grocer and whiskey speculator Charlton Alexander for $30,550 cash. The transaction included the Bourbon Distillery, bonded warehouse, land, machinery, brands and trademarks.

Now famous for their copper distilled bourbon, the pair would introduce James A. Miller's Chicken Cock Rye in the 1870s. Because the firm sold their whiskey in barrels, it was very easy for unscrupulous retailers to pass off lower quality whiskey as the genuine article. To deter counterfeits, White & Alexander began branding the distillery name "J.A. Miller Old Bourbon Distillery" on one barrel head and "J.A. Miller Chicken Cock Whisky" on the other barrel head.

With increasing interest in the growing railroad industry, Charlton Alexander would sell his half of the company to George G. White in November 1878 for $25,000 cash. Soon after, the distillery would become known officially as the G. G. White Distillery and unofficially as the Chicken Cock Distillery.

=== White & Ferguson ===
In January 1881, George G. White would once again take on a partner - New York City wine and spirits distributor Yates Ferguson. Ferguson was a former gold rush 49er and was a retailer of the brand. He paid $35,000 for half interest in the distillery and the trademark. The duo grew the capacity of the distillery to 600 bushels a day and over 9,000 barrels a year. They increased the storage capacity from one warehouse to six, with a capacity of 32,000 barrels. During this time, J.A. Miller Chicken Cock whiskey was sold as "sweet mash bourbon, fire copper". The distillery boasted thirty-five employees, 500 cattle and 800 hogs. It had grown so large that grain had to be sourced from outside of Bourbon County. The distillery also had an on-site cooperage.

In 1882, the G. G. White Distillery was taxed on 18,391 barrels, while their nearest Bourbon County competitor, Sam Clay & Co., had nearly half that at 9,797 barrels.

In 1883, the distillery would become the first in the area to export into the Dominion of Canada. Meanwhile, Yates Ferguson would create a combine of spirits distributors in New York, under the name Distillers Wine and Spirits Exchange. He would also become a copper speculator in Texas Senator Tabor's Copper Speculation syndicate. In 1884, White & Ferguson would be two of several incorporators in a bourbon combine called the Central Kentucky Exportation and Guarantee Company. Several big names in the bourbon industry would be part of the organization, including R.P. Stoll, William Tarr, and H.E. Pogue. Its purpose was to provide relief to distillers in an age of overproduction. It would foreshadow the era of the Whiskey Trust.

Millionaire Yates Ferguson would die unexpectedly on March 1, 1887, at 63. In his will, he left his share of the distillery and trademark to his daughter, Mary M. Keeler of Westchester County, New York.

=== The G. G. White Company ===
With the death of Yates Ferguson, George G. White, Mary M. Keeler, and their partners filed Articles of Incorporation with the State of Kentucky and established the G. G. White Company on April 6, 1887.

Under the new leadership Chicken Cock whiskey spread to Germany, with 400 barrels being sent to Bremen in March 1887 and 555 more to Hamburg in June. The distillery was also sending its spent grains to German farmers. The business was good enough that the company invested in a state-of-the-art slop drying machine. Unfortunately, the machine caused a fire destroying the drying plant and causing $6,000 in damage.

Normally sold in barrels, it was around this time that Chicken Cock Bottled-In-Bond Bourbon was introduced in bottles with the rooster logo.

=== The Kentucky Distillers and Warehouse Company ===
In 1899, George White attempted to get back into direct distillery ownership when he made a $60,000 bid at auction on Thompson and William Tarr's historic Ashland Distillery (aka Tarr Distillery) in Lexington. Leonard G. Cox, of Graves, Cox & Co., outbid White by $1. Cox was a straw bidder for the newly formed Kentucky Distillers and Warehouse Company (KDWC), also referred to as the Whiskey Trust. Having scooped up over fifty Kentucky distilleries within 90 days of its formation, they would add the G. G. White Company, the Chicken Cock trademark, and G. G. White Distillery to the fold on April 5 for $75,000. On July 12, 1899, the KDWC would merge with three other trusts under the Distilling Company of America (DCA).

In April 1900, a leak in the boiler was blamed for a fire that destroyed the still house of the G. G. White Distillery. The loss was upwards of $30,000, but insurance covered $22,000. The KDWC considered moving the production of J.A. Miller's Chicken Cock to near Cynthiana, Kentucky, but eventually rebuilt the still house in Paris.

In 1902, the parent company Distilling Company of America went into receivership and re-emerged as Distillers' Securities Corporation. Over the next ten years, its distilling property in Paris would produce around 3,000 barrels of Chicken Cock whiskey per season. With temperance on the rise, the KDWC looked to consolidate and in 1911, the G. G. White Distillery shut down production and was dismantled. The distilling equipment and production of Chicken Cock moved to E. J. Curley Distillery at Camp Nelson. E. J. Curley was the President of the Distillers' Securities Company. In July 1914, the G. G. White Distillery and adjacent properties were sold to N. Ford Brent for his seed company. The KDWC added a clause that stipulated that they could not use the property for the manufacture or production of whiskey, alcohol, or spirits of any kind. Production of Chicken Cock would halt in September 1917 when Kentucky went into statewide Prohibition.

=== Prohibition ===
During Prohibition, Chicken Cock was passed around until it eventually landed with American Medicinal Spirits Company (AMS), another offshoot of the old Whiskey Trust. They sold it as a medicinal whiskey. The whiskey came from consolidation warehouses that had collected whiskey from a variety of distilleries, including ones in Christiana and New Hope, Kentucky. As medicinal whiskey ran low, a distiller holiday was called for in 1927, and AMS considered the expansion of distilling. They established 17 new distillery companies with the Maryland State Tax Commission, including the Chicken Cock Distillery Company.

=== National Distillers ===
In December 1929, National Distillers, Inc., which had developed out of the Distillers' Securities Corporation and owned partial shares in American Medicinal Spirits, took 100% control of AMS. National Distillers' president Seton Porter had positioned himself for the repeal of the 18th Amendment by accumulating whiskey and Chicken Cock was one of the brands he hoped to reintroduce to the market as a straight bourbon and rye.

After the repeal of Prohibition, they sold Chicken Cock as a 3-year-old, 4-year-old, and a blend. Pennsylvania became a target market with an emphasis on rye. Sold as "The Famous Old Brand", much of the whiskey came from Baltimore and Kentucky warehouses.

Porter's gamble on the popularity of straight bourbon and rye eventually failed as lighter scotch blends and Canadian whisky gained market share. World War II and the conversion of distilleries over to Industrial production for the war saw the end of the promotion of Chicken Cock. Over the next few years, the brand faded from store shelves. Eventually, National Distillers let the Chicken Cock trademark expire.

The last reminder of the historic brand, the old G. G. White Distillery, burned to the ground in 1961. In the cornerstone of its ruins was found a pint bottle of Chicken Cock that had apparently been placed there when the distillery was sold. The owner's son kept the bottle as a future gift for his own grandson.

=== Modern era ===
In 2011, spirits entrepreneur Matti Anttila was researching the history of bourbon and Kentucky distilling and learned of the Chicken Cock Whiskey brand. After discovering a bottle of Chicken Cock on eBay and multiple bottles at the Oscar Getz Whiskey Museum in Bardstown, Kentucky, he began purchasing bourbons and searching for relics of the Chicken Cock era to better understand and resurrect the brand.

Since then, he has released a variety of whiskeys ranging from limited release bottles to a flagship bourbon and rye whiskey. The bottling of barrel #1 was sold exclusively on the brand's Facebook page and sold out in less than 48 hours.

On September 10, 2018, Bardstown Bourbon Company announced that Anttila's company Grain & Barrel Spirits had joined their Collaborative Distilling Program.

On August 5, 2026, Chicken Cock Whiskey was sold to Next Century Spirits.

== Name origin ==
"Chicken cock" was a popular name for a rooster in the southern United States. Prior to the Civil War, it was a symbol of defiance. Its origin goes back to the War of 1812, when American ships were under attack by British ships on Lake Champlain. Legend has it that a spent round broke open a chicken coop on board the USS Saratoga and a rooster flew to the rail of the ship and began crowing incessantly, inspiring the Americans. Organizations including the Democratic Party would use the chicken cock as a symbol of strong will and defiance.

When James A. Miller died, his brother Joseph W. Miller traveled to New Orleans several times to handle his brother's affairs. Old Crow had been a major competitor to James A. Miller's "celebrated old bourbon" since the 1850s and its bird related name may have been an inspiration.

Chicken Cock was also the name of a Segar (cigar) brand in the 1850s and 1860s when the whiskey name emerged.

=== Boyle, Miller & Co., of Cincinnati ===
In 1870, the Internal Revenue Service seized a lot of 14,000 barrels of whiskey listed as being made by White & Alexander of Paris, KY. Discovered in San Francisco, this imitation whiskey was selling for ninety-five cents a gallon, well below the price of real Chicken Cock. Yates Ferguson, who was a distributor of Chicken Cock and not yet an owner, alerted the government to the fraud. They valued the whiskey at nearly a million dollars.

=== G. G. White Company vs. John Miller & Co. ===
In 1892, George G. White noticed a whiskey being advertised in the Boston area by a liquor dealer named John Miller as Miller's Game Cock Rye. The brand used a rooster standing inside a circle as its symbol. G. G. White Company sued and when the case came before a judge in the Massachusetts office of the United States Circuit Court, the judge saw the infringement as clear, "even though the defendants did not surround the figure of the cock with the same which were used by the plaintiffs", and granted an injunction.

=== Distillers Corporation Limited (of Canada) ===
On December 14, 1928, Distillers Corporation Limited (DCL) of 1430 Peel Street, Montreal, Quebec, applied for a trademark with the Canadian government for "CHICKEN COCK". In September 1930, they applied for a trademark on a 16 oz and 32 oz bottle design featuring embossed chicken wire and a rooster. A Canadian Rye whisky was distilled and placed in the bottles, which were set inside a blue tin and labeled Chickencock Pure Rye Whisky.

After the United States Congress put pressure on the Canadian government to crack down on whiskey crossing the border during Prohibition, the DCL sent this whisky to the small French island of Saint Pierre, just off of the Newfoundland coast. From there, it would be sold by French merchants to rum runners working off the coast of New York City. Chickencock, as they spelled it, became a favorite at several speakeasies in the city.

In 1946, National Distillers Products Corporation, who had never given permission for the use of this trademark, was granted $5 along with retaining full rights to the brands Chicken Cock, Old Log Cabin, and Honeymoon along with rights of recovery for past infringements.

== Brand homes ==
In 2024, Chicken Cock Whiskey opened its first dedicated brand home, Circa 1856, in Bardstown, Kentucky. The tasting room and retail space highlight the brand's 19th-century heritage and modern portfolio through guided tastings and special events.

In 2025, the brand expanded with Circa 1856 Louisville, located in the NuLu district of downtown Louisville. The new site features a street-level tasting room and a speakeasy-style bar beneath the venue. The opening was marked by a proclamation from the Mayor of Louisville declaring October 29 as "Chicken Cock Whiskey Circa 1856 Day."

Both Circa 1856 locations serve as experiential hubs for visitors and as venues for limited-edition releases, tastings, and partner activations.

== In popular culture ==
=== Corbett–Fitzsimmons fight ===
On St. Patrick's Day 1897, a title fight for the World Heavyweight championship was held in Carson City, Nevada between "Gentleman" Jim Corbett and "Ruby" Robert Fitzsimmons. The local news reported that Boldrick, the manager of the G. G. White Distillery, sent 45 barrels of Chicken Cock whiskey, most of it 18 years old, to Carson City for the fight. The writer quipped, it "doubtless caused many knockouts before and after the fight". This fight holds special significance as it was filmed and is considered the first full-length feature documentary.

=== Duke Ellington ===
The Cotton Club, located in Harlem at 142nd St. and Lenox Avenue, featured Chickencock Pure Rye Whisky as their house whiskey throughout Prohibition. The Cotton Club was one of the most famous speakeasies and hosted some of the jazz era's most prominent musicians.

Ellington recalled in his memoirs Music Is My Mistress, that "during the prohibition period, you could always buy good whiskey from somebody in the Cotton Club. They used to have what they called Chicken Cock. It was a bottle in a can, and the can was sealed. It cost something like ten to fourteen dollars a pint."

== Modern releases ==
- Chicken Cock Kentucky Straight Bourbon 90 proof
- Chicken Cock Kentucky Straight Rye 90 proof

=== Limited edition releases ===
- Chicken Cock 160th Anniversary 8 Year-Old Single Barrel Bourbon (2017)
- Chicken Cock 10 Year-Old Double Barrel Bourbon (2018)
- Chicken Cock Beer Barrel Select Kentucky Bourbon (2019)
- Chicken Cock Ryeteous Blonde Kentucky Rye (2020)
- Chicken Cock 15 Year-Old Barrel Proof Bourbon (2020)
- Chicken Cock 20 Year-Old Cotton Club Canadian Rye (2021)
- Chicken Cock Island Rooster Rum Barrel Finished Rye (Spring 2022)
- Chicken Cock Private Cask 7 Year-Old Bourbon (Fall 2022)
- Chicken Cock Chanticleer Cognac Barrel Finished Bourbon (Fall 2022)
