= Old Pogue =

- Type: Distillery
- Founded: 1876
- Headquarters: Maysville, Kentucky,

Old Pogue is a brand of Kentucky straight bourbon whiskey. Located in Maysville, Kentucky, the Old Pogue Distillery carries strong family ties dating back to the 1870s, and is privately owned by members of the Pogue family.

== History ==
The Pogues created the bourbon Old Pogue in 1876. Its original distillery was Kentucky registered distillery number 3, in Maysville, Kentucky. However, the brand's distillery was shut down by Prohibition in 1920, making the distribution and distilling of alcohol illegal. Shortly after this, many distillers including the Pogues were finding other ways up distribute their alcohol. The only exception to the prohibition was the case of medicinal purposes, because distillation was not allowed they sold a restricted amount of the whisky for medicine. When times became harder and alcohol was at a higher demand than ever, with the help of George Remus, they sold their whisky through bootlegging. It was revived after 18 years and then shut down again during World War II. The brand was then off the market for about 60 years.

The brand name was revived around 2005 by descendants of the Pogue family, who re-launched the brand using whiskey purchased from another company before opening their own new distillery. This bourbon has been passed down through six generations of Henry Edgar Pogues (I-VI), and is still owned by a descendant of the first Henry Pogue.

The family established a new distillery in Maysville in 2012. That year, the company joined the Kentucky Distillers Association and the distillery became part of the newly launched "Craft Tour" of the Kentucky Bourbon Trail. The distillery produces roughly 200 barrels of bourbon, rye, and wheat whiskey each year.

== Spirits ==
Old Pogue is bottled at 45.5% abv (91 U.S. proof), and is created from a rye mash bill with nine-year aging. The modern day Old Pogue is considered a close rendition of the original. Like most bourbons, Old Pogue is typically consumed neat.

One expression of the brand is a "Master's Select" bottling.
