= John Dunville =

British Army officer, Victoria Cross recipient (1896–1917)

John Spencer Dunville VC
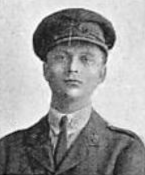
- Born: 7 May 1896; Marylebone, England
- Died: 26 June 1917 (aged 21); Villers-Faucon, France
- Burial place: Villers-Faucon Communal Cemetery
- Military career
- Allegiance: United Kingdom
- Branch: British Army
- Service years: 1914–1917
- Rank: Second Lieutenant
- Units: 6th (Inniskilling) Dragoons; 1st (Royal) Dragoons
- Conflicts: First World War †
- Awards: Victoria Cross

John Spencer Dunville, VC (7 May 1896 – 26 June 1917) was a British Army officer and an English recipient of the Victoria Cross, the highest award for gallantry in the face of the enemy that can be awarded to British and Commonwealth forces.

== Early life and education ==
Dunville was born on 7 May 1896 in Marylebone, London, to Colonel John Dunville Dunville and Violet Anne Blanch Dunville (née Lambart). His father was from Holywood, County Down and was chairman of Dunville & Co whisky distillers. Dunville was educated at Ludgrove School and Eton College, and was a member of the Officers' Training Corps from May 1912 to July 1914. He passed matriculation for Trinity College, Cambridge, but with the outbreak of the First World War joined the army instead.

== Victoria Cross ==
He was aged 21 and a second lieutenant in the 1st (Royal) Dragoons, British Army during the First World War when he was awarded the Victoria Cross for his actions on 25 June 1917 near Épehy, France.

For most conspicuous bravery. When in charge of a party consisting of scouts and Royal Engineers engaged in the demolition of the enemy's wire, this officer displayed great gallantry and disregard of all personal danger. In order to ensure the absolute success of the work entrusted to him, 2nd Lt. Dunville placed himself between an N.C.O. of the Royal Engineers and the enemy's fire, and, thus protected, this N.C.O. was enabled to complete a work of great importance. 2nd Lt. Dunville, although severely wounded, continued to direct his men in the wire-cutting and general operations until the raid was successfully completed, thereby setting a magnificent example of courage, determination and devotion to duty, to all ranks under his command. This gallant officer has since succumbed to his wounds.

— London Gazette, No. 30215, 31 July 1917

Second Lieutenant John Spencer Dunville died of wounds on 26 June 1917, the day after performing the deed, and is interred at the Villiers-Faucon Communal Cemetery, Somme, France, (Plot No. A21).

His Victoria Cross is displayed at the Household Cavalry Museum in Horse Guards in London.
