= Old St Andrews =

Brand of Scotch whisky

Old St Andrews is a blended Scotch whisky that is bottled in a distinctive golf ball-shaped bottle. There are several different sizes of bottles, from the one-litre clear-glass version to miniature white ones designed to look like real golf balls.

Old St Andrews is often used for prizes at golfing events, and its marketing relies heavily on the novelty-shape of its bottle. The brand has recently changed its packaging to a clear tube, which makes the golf ball-shaped bottle more visible.

The brand was made popular in the 1980s by Denis Thatcher (husband of Margaret Thatcher), who was often photographed on the golf course with a golf ball miniature in his hand. It soon found favour with the golfing community and saw an expanded level of sales in duty-free shops in the mid-1990s. However, at the end of the 1990s, duty-free sales in Europe ended with the creation of the single-market European Union.

Recently, following the appointment of new distributors, the brand has seen a resurgence.
