= Wheat whisky =

Distilled alcoholic beverage

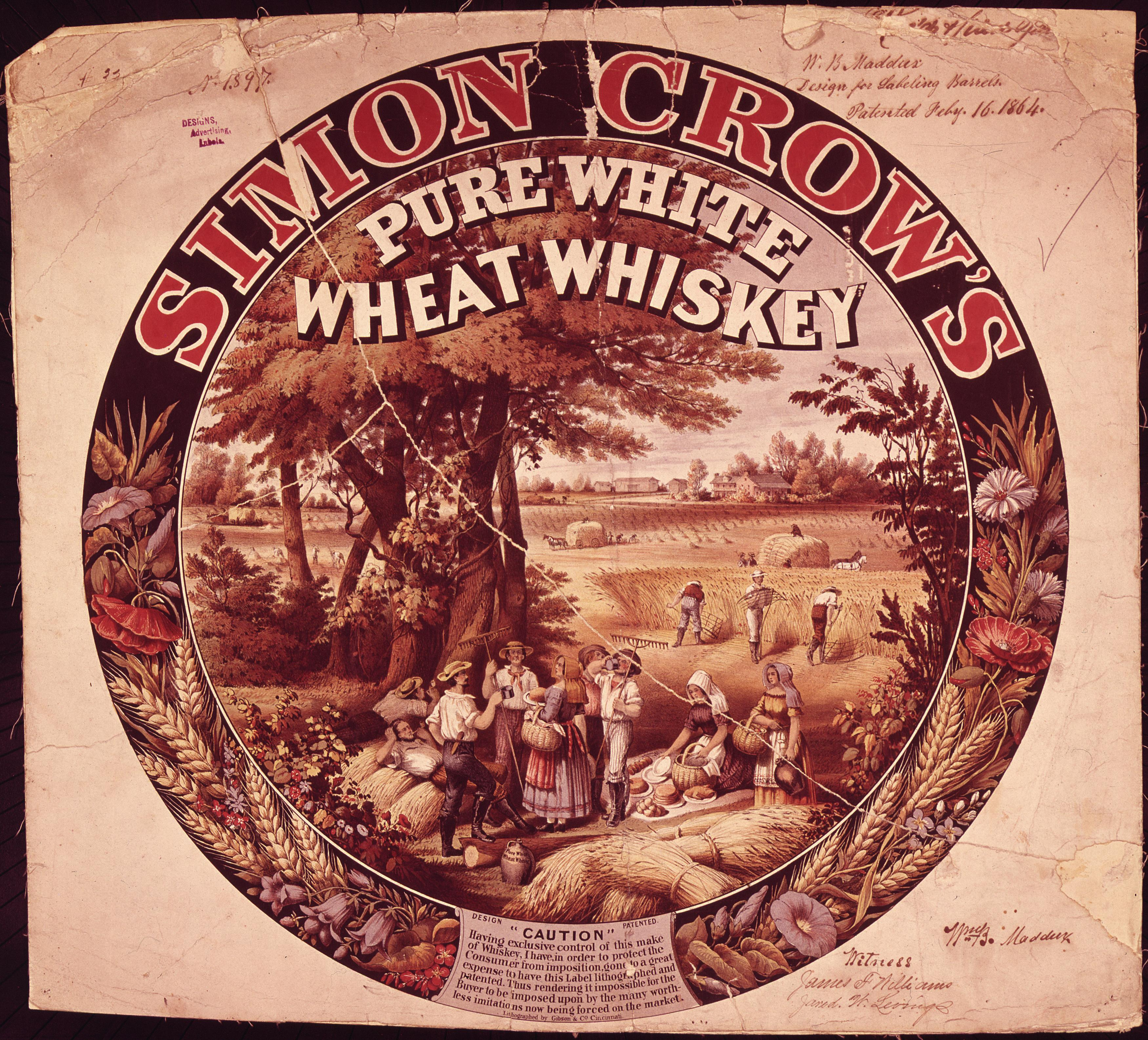
Simon Crow's Pure White Wheat Whiskey label patent application, 1864

Wheat whisky is a style of whisky defined by having a grain bill which consists primarily of wheat. The United States government only allows a product to be labeled "wheat whiskey" when the mash is composed of at least 51% wheat. Like other American styles, a wheat whisky may be labelled as "straight" if it is aged for at least two years in new, charred oak barrels. As of 2022, only a handful of straight wheat whiskey are mass marketed, including Bernheim Original, Middle West, Old Elk, and Dry Fly. Some microdistilleries are in production of wheat whiskeys, but are made on a small scale.

There are many examples of wheat whiskys in the German whisky industry.

While not true wheat whiskys, some bourbon whiskeys are "wheated"; that is they use a certain percentage of wheat in their mashbills instead of (or complementary to) the more common rye. Such brands include Cabin Still, Maker's Mark, Old Fitzgerald, Pappy Van Winkle's Family Reserve, Rebel Yell, and W. L. Weller.

== See also ==
- Outline of whisky
