= Stitzel–Weller Distillery =

Historic distillery in Louisville, Kentucky, US

Coordinates: 38.2095845°N 85.8090329°W

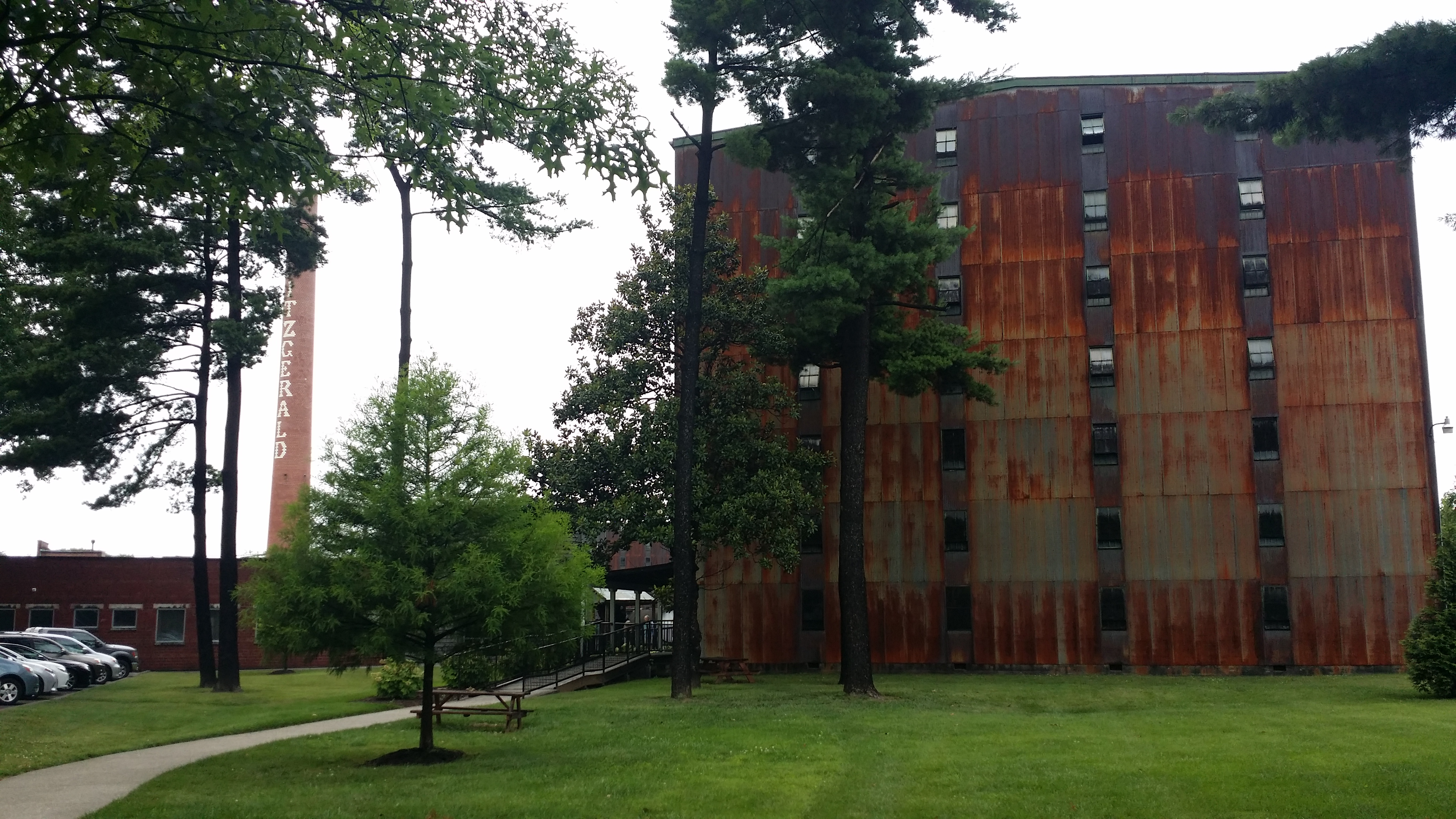
- View from outside the Stitzel–Weller Distillery, 2017
- Industry: Bourbon distilling
- Founded: May 5, 1935; 90 years ago
- Founders: Julian Van Winkle Sr., Alex T. Farnsley; Arthur Phillip Stitzel
- Headquarters: Louisville, Kentucky, United States
- Parent: Diageo
- Website: www.stitzelwellerdistillery.com

Stitzel–Weller Distillery is a former distillery located in Shively, a suburb of Louisville, Kentucky. It was founded in 1935, sold in 1972, and closed in 1992. It produced a number of notable brands, and since 2014 it has served as a public tourism site for Bulleit Bourbon, as part of the Kentucky Bourbon Trail.

== History ==
The Stitzel–Weller Distilling Company was founded in 1935 with the combination of the distributor W. L. Weller & Sons, and the A. Ph. Stitzel Distillery. The two companies continued to operate together during Prohibition, selling spirits under a medicinal license. Following the repeal of prohibition by the passage of the Twenty-first Amendment, the Stitzel–Weller Distillery was built by Julian "Pappy" Van Winkle Sr., (Note: Julian "Pappy" Van Winkle Sr. was born in 1874 in Danville, Kentucky, and died in 1965. He began his career in 1983 as a salesman for W. L. Weller and eventually went on to buy the company along with Farnsley. Together, following the death of W. L. Weller, the two controlled 203 out of 206 shares of the company.) along with Alex T. Farnsley, (Note: Alex T. Farnsley was born in Louisville, Kentucky, on February 9, 1969, and died in 1941. He had also been a salesman for Weller along with Van Winkle.) and Arthur Phillip Stitzel. The facility opened on Derby Day in 1935, and became popularly known as the Old Fitzgerald Distillery, after the main brand of bourbon it produced, which it acquired from the Old Judge Distillery located west of Frankfort, Kentucky in 1933. The 53-acre (21 ha) site was chosen so as to be outside of the city limits and therefore avoid taxes, and because of the quality of water at the location. Outside, the owners displayed a sign reading "no chemists allowed", a homage to their belief that distilling should be treated as "an art, not a science".

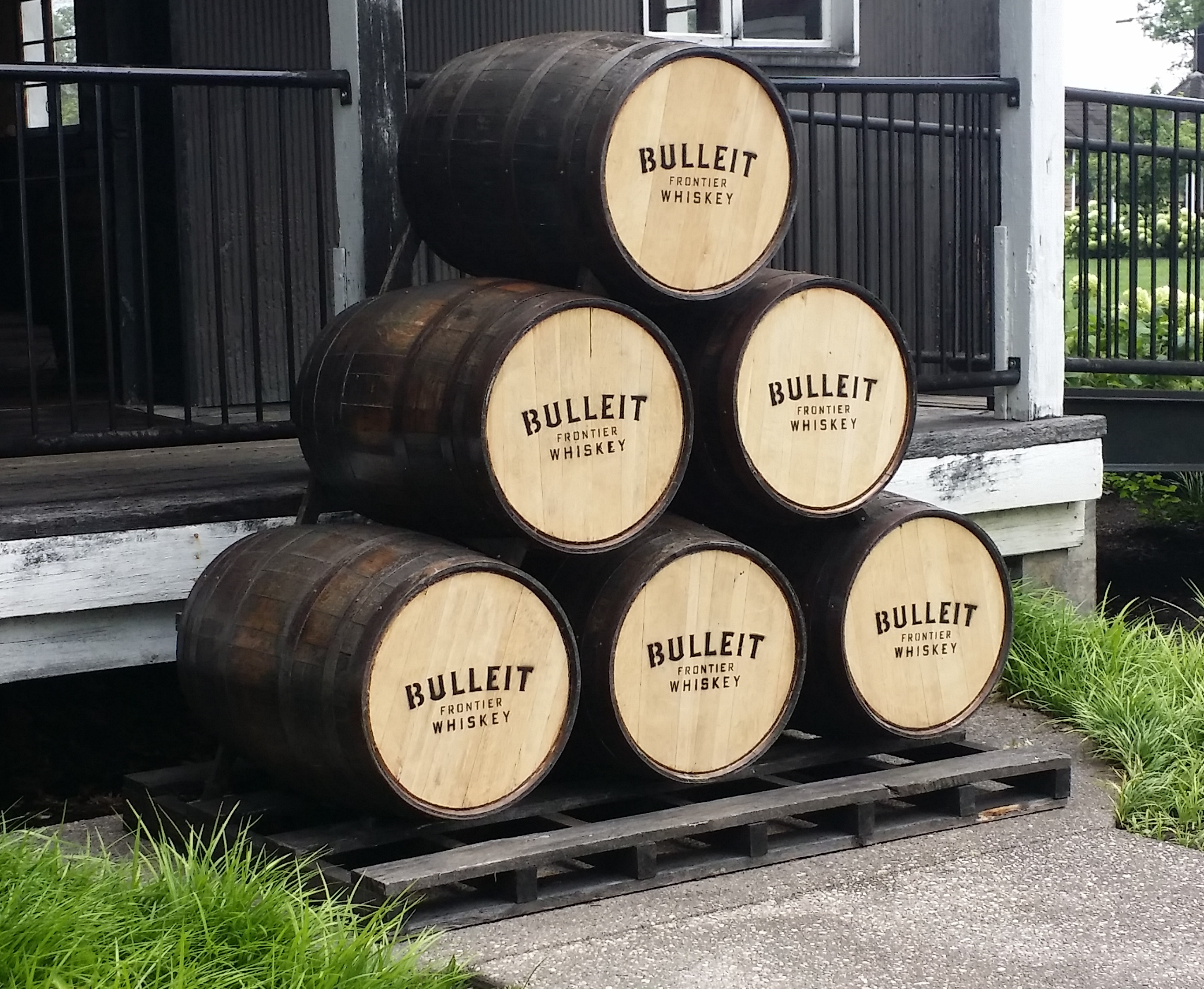
Decorative barrels outside the coopering exhibit

Farnsley and Stitzel died in 1941 and 1947 respectively, leaving the distillery in the control of Van Winkle. Van Winkle himself died in 1965, and operations passed to his son, Julian Van Winkle Jr.

The facility was eventually sold on June 30, 1972, to Norton-Simon, amidst a broad depression in the sales of whiskey, as the drink lost popularity to other spirits. The sale was made under the condition that Julian Van Winkle Jr. would be able to procure old stocks from the site, and maintain the Van Winkle brand name. Norton-Simon officially changed the name to the Old Fitzgerald Distillery and organized it under the company Somerset Imports, itself later acquired by Distillers Corporation Limited, and then by Guinness PLC, which became United Distillers. A number of brands were sold off to other companies, such as Heaven Hill and Buffalo Trace, and the facility finally closed in 1992, although some products, such as Bulleit and Crown Royal continued to be aged there. In 1992, United Distillers officially changed the facility's name back to the Stitzel–Weller Distillery.

Diageo, the latest incarnation of United Distillers following a 1997 merger with Grand Metropolitan, reopened the facility 2014 with a $10–18 million investment.

== Brands ==
The facility produced brands such as W. L. Weller, Old Fitzgerald, Pappy Van Winkle, Rebel Yell, and Cabin Still. Along with the 1972 closure, Rebel Yell was sold to The David Sherman Corporation, W.L. Weller to the Ancient Age distillery, to eventually be distilled by Buffalo Trace under the Sazerac Company, and the Old Fitzgerald brand to Heaven Hill. As of 2017, owner Diageo has restarted bottling Bulleit Bourbon at the site.

Stitzel–Weller was influential along with Maker's Mark, for championing the making of wheated bourbon, substituting wheat for the rye more popularly used in bourbon making. It was also notable for often aging its spirits longer than the normal industry standard of the time, storing product at times 10 years or more.

== Capacity ==
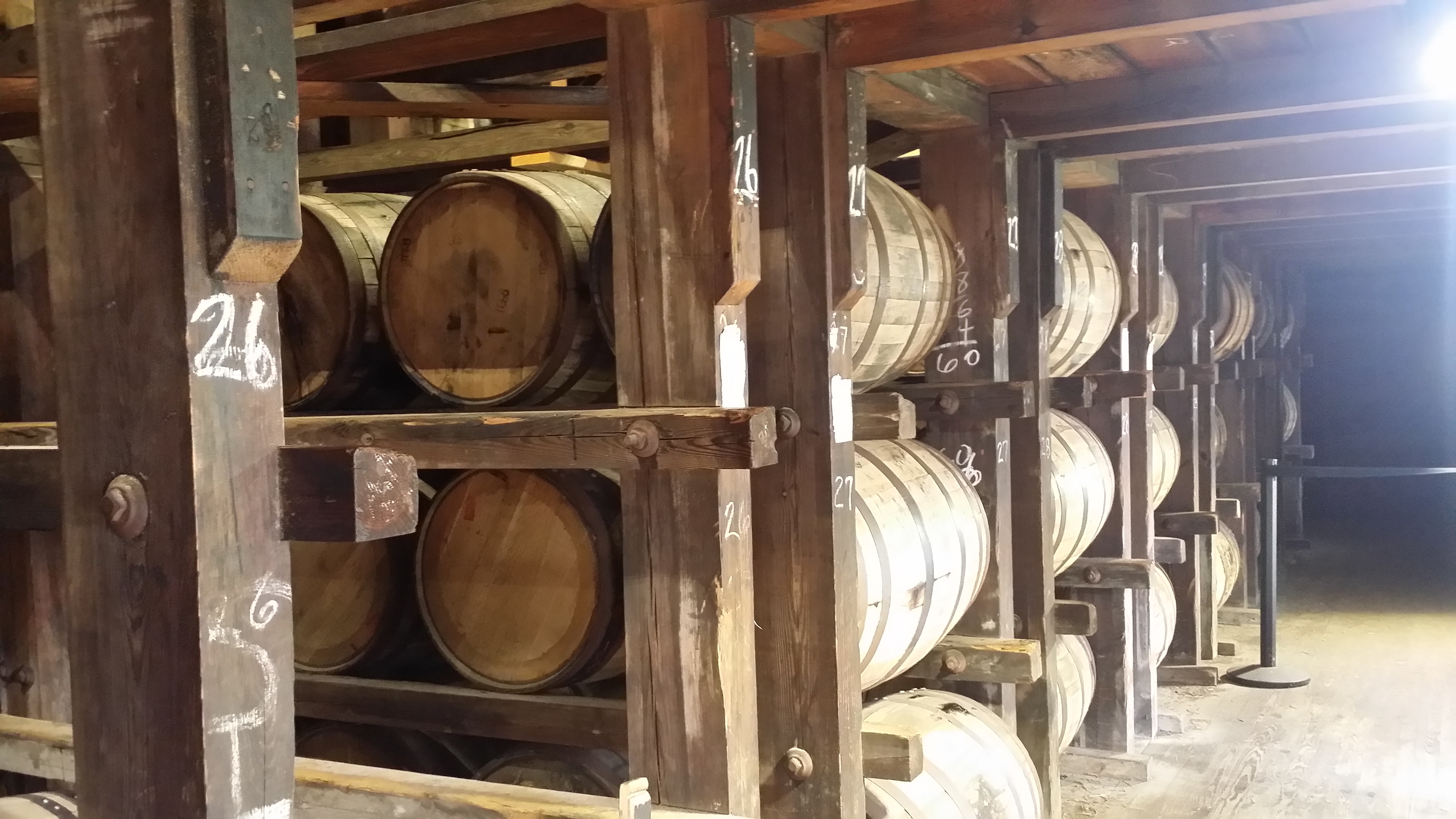
Barrels of bourbon aging in a storage warehouse at Stitzel–Weller in 2017

Upon opening in 1935, the facility had two warehouses with combined capacity to store 25,200 barrels. At its height, the facility boasted a workforce of 220 and a capacity of 800,000 cases annually. As of 2001 the facility was composed of 18 total warehouses with a combined capacity to store 300,000 barrels.

The original doubler was reclaimed and in use as of 2017 at the Bulleit distillery in Shelbyville, Kentucky. As of 2017, the facility was used mostly for aging, with only one still in operation, producing about a barrel per day, and used for experimentation and research.

== Master distillers ==
Will McGill served as the first Master Distiller for the Stitzel–Weller Distillery. McGill was previously affiliated with the Early Times and Tom Moore distilleries in Nelson County, Kentucky, and when he died in 1952, he was the "oldest executive distiller in the industry" at 87. He was followed as master distiller by Andrew J. Corcoran (died 1958), Roy Hawes (ending in 1971), and Woodrow Wilson. Wilson has previously spent 12 years as an assistant to Hawes.

== Tour ==
Beginning on September 16, 2014, the site became a tourism attraction called the "Bulleit Frontier Whiskey Experience" as part of the Kentucky Bourbon Trail. As of 2015, 8,400 visitors had toured the site.

== See also ==
- American Whiskey Trail
- Distilled Spirits Council of the United States
- Kentucky Bourbon Festival
- List of attractions and events in the Louisville metropolitan area
- List of historic whisky distilleries
- List of whisky brands

== Notes ==
Alex Farnley was born in 1869 and died in 1941
