= Rebel (bourbon) =

Brand of Kentucky straight bourbon whiskey

Rebel Bourbon whiskey
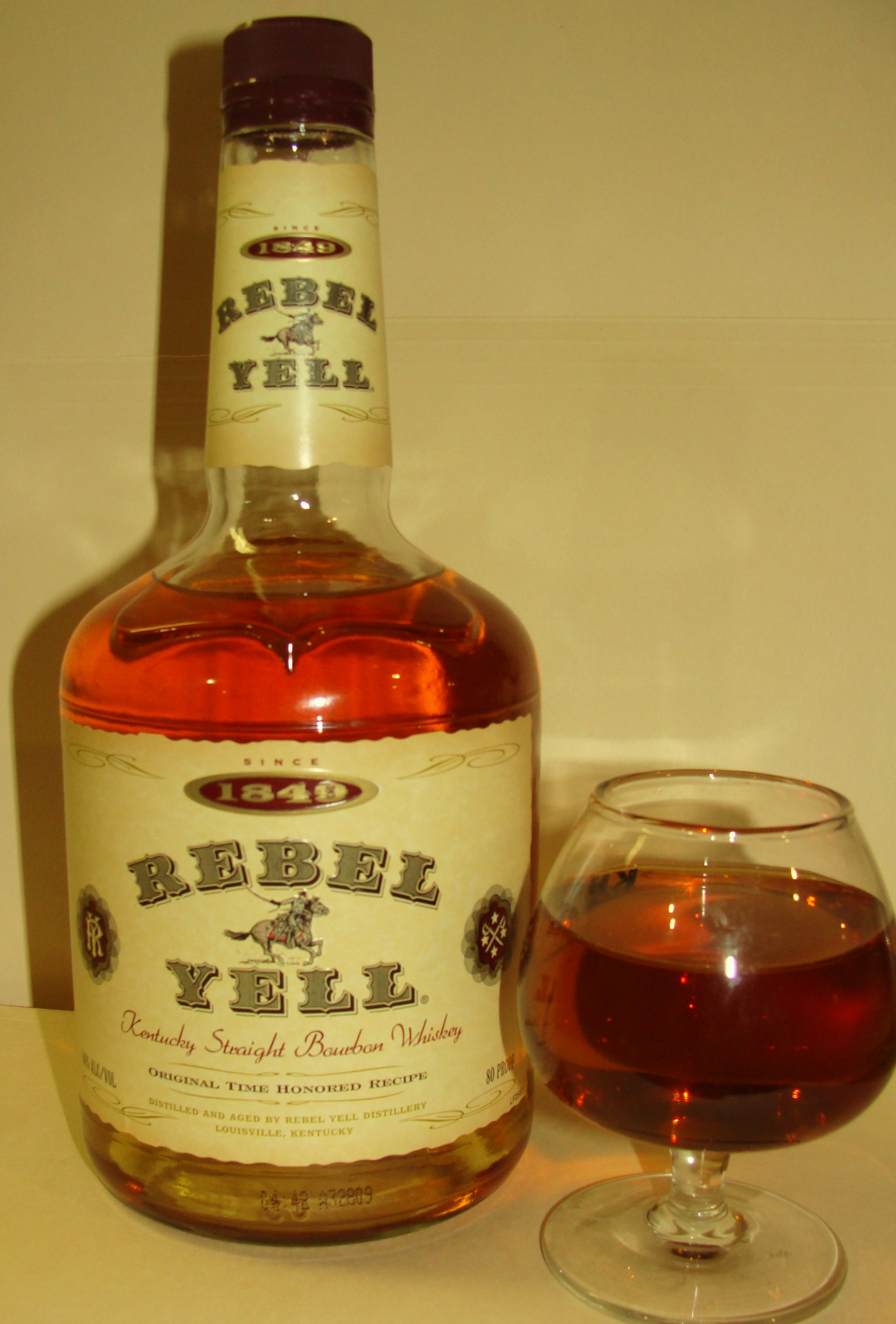
- An older bottle still sporting the Rebel Yell brand
- Type: Bourbon whiskey
- Manufacturer: MGP Ingredients
- Country of origin: Kentucky, United States
- Introduced: 1936
- Alcohol by volume: 40%
- Proof (US): 80
- Related products: Ezra Brooks, David Nicholson, and Blood Oath Bourbons

Rebel, formerly Rebel Yell until 2020, is a brand of Kentucky straight bourbon whiskey owned and marketed by MGP Ingredients. Rebel Yell is currently distilled and aged at the Lux Row Distillery, in Bardstown, Kentucky, which opened in 2018. As is typical for a bourbon, it is sold at 40% alcohol by volume (80 U.S. proof). Before the opening of the Lux Row Distillery, the brand was produced under contract by Heaven Hill at its Bernheim distillery in Louisville.

The brand was originally produced in the 1930s at the Stitzel–Weller Distillery and has a wheated mash bill, like some other brands from that distillery. As indicated by its name (especially its prior name), the brand was historically marketed as being associated with the Confederate States of America. Until the 1980s, it was distributed only in the Southern United States.

== History ==
The W.L. Weller & Sons company was founded in 1849 by William Larue Weller, who pioneered using wheat instead of rye in his mash for a lighter flavor than the older style of bourbons. The W.L. Weller company merged with the Stitzel distilling company (est. 1872) to form the Stitzel-Weller distilling company in 1910.

The "Rebel Yell" brand was created at Stitzel-Weller in the 1930s with the idea of distilling it in limited batches for exclusive distribution in the Southern United States. Charles R. Farnsley, a former mayor of Louisville who was related to the owners of the distillery, owned the brand. In the early 1980s, after some other changes of ownership following the break-up of Stitzel-Weller around 1972, the brand was purchased by the David Sherman Corporation of St. Louis, Missouri (now Luxco). By 1984, Rebel Yell was distributed nationally.

In 2020, in order to distance the brand from Confederate iconography, the name was shortened to simply "Rebel".

In April 2021, MGP Ingredients completed its acquisition of Luxco.

== Song inspiration ==
Keith Richards of The Rolling Stones was once known to be an avid drinker of Rebel Yell. In fact, Billy Idol has said in his episode of VH1 Storytellers that his hit "Rebel Yell" was inspired upon joining Richards, Mick Jagger and Ron Wood in taking swigs from a bottle of Rebel Yell at a gathering they all attended. He liked the sound of the brand name, and said he recalled that he actually asked if they (Jagger and Richards) had no objections to his use of the brand name for a future song title.

== See also ==
- Rebel yell, the namesake war cry
- Other wheated bourbon brands produced by the Stitzel-Weller distillery:
  - W. L. Weller, a brand named after the distiller who is said to have pioneered the use of wheated bourbon recipes
  - Old Fitzgerald, another bourbon brand, originally produced by another company but purchased by Stitzel-Weller soon after Prohibition and thereafter converted to using a wheated recipe
  - Pappy Van Winkle's Family Reserve, another wheated bourbon brand, named after a leading figure of the Stitzel-Weller history
- Maker's Mark, a well-known wheated bourbon developed from a recipe influenced by Pappy Van Winkle of Stitzel-Weller
