= Bernheim distillery =

Bernheim distillery may refer to:

- Bernheim distillery, operated in the 1890s by Bernheim Brothers in Louisville, Kentucky
- Bernheim distillery, operated since around 2000 by Heaven Hill in Louisville, Kentucky
