= George Stagg =

George Stagg may refer to:

- George Stagg (died 1966), former policeman who murdered English footballer Tommy Ball
- George T. Stagg, a limited-production bourbon whiskey distributed by Buffalo Trace Distillery
