= Buffalo Trace Distillery =

- George T. Stagg Distillery
- U.S. National Register of Historic Places
- U.S. National Historic Landmark
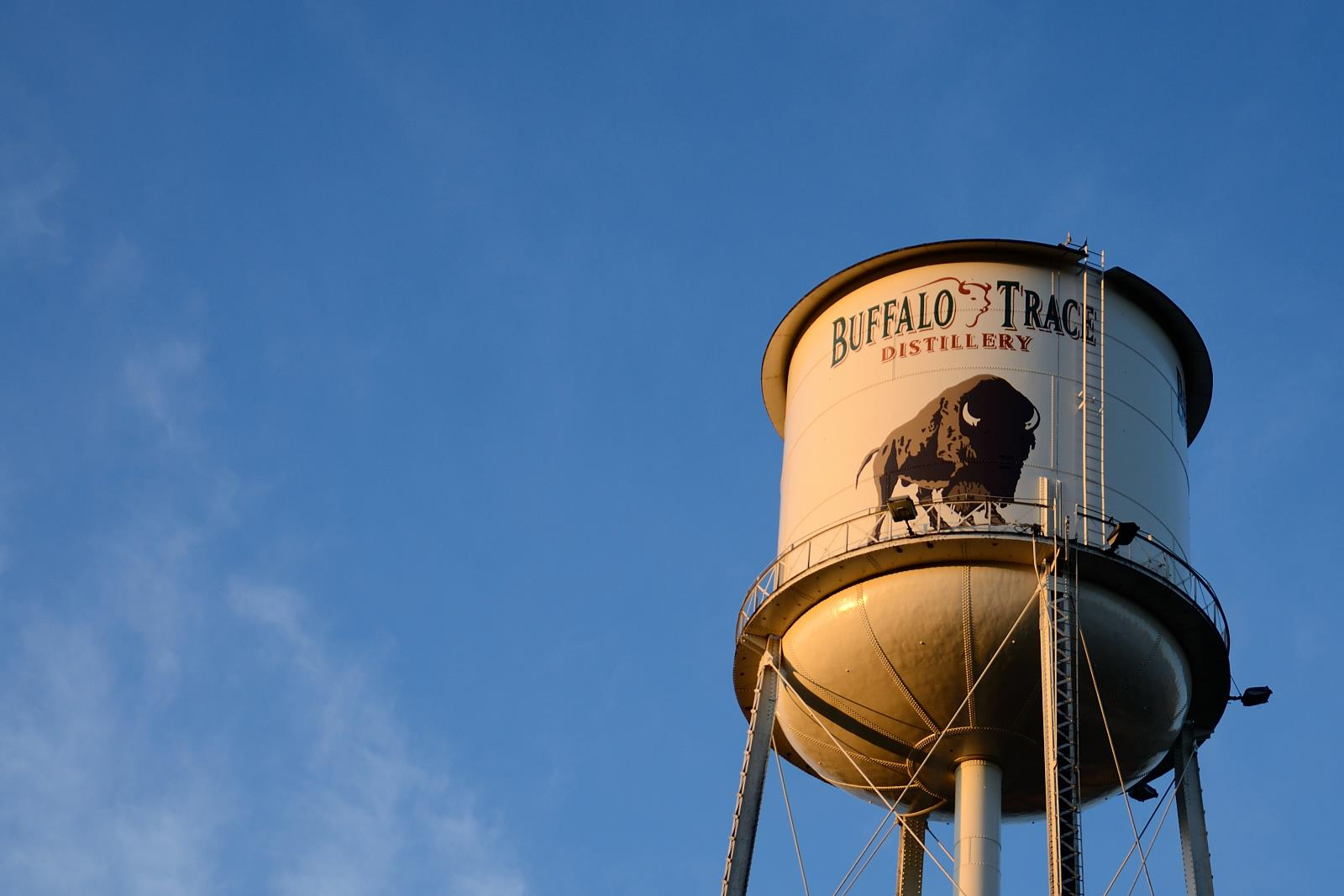
- Buffalo Trace Distillery water tower

- Location within Kentucky Location within the United States
- Location: Frankfort, Kentucky
- Coordinates: 38°13′03″N 84°52′10″W
- Built: 1805
- Architects: Oberwarth, Leo L.; Blanton, Albert Bacon
- Architectural style: Romanesque, Colonial Revival
- NRHP reference No.: 01000450
- Added to NRHP: May 2, 2001

Buffalo Trace Distillery (formerly the George T. Stagg Distillery and the Old Fashioned Copper (O.F.C.) Distillery) is a distillery in Frankfort, Kentucky, United States, owned by the Sazerac Company. Its namesake bourbon brand, Buffalo Trace Kentucky Straight Bourbon whiskey, was introduced in August 1999. The name "Buffalo Trace" refers to the ancient buffalo trackway that crosses the Kentucky River in Franklin County, Kentucky. The Sazerac Company purchased the distillery in 1992.

Under the George T. Stagg Distillery name, the property was listed on the National Register of Historic Places on May 2, 2001, and designated a National Historic Landmark on March 11, 2013.

== History ==
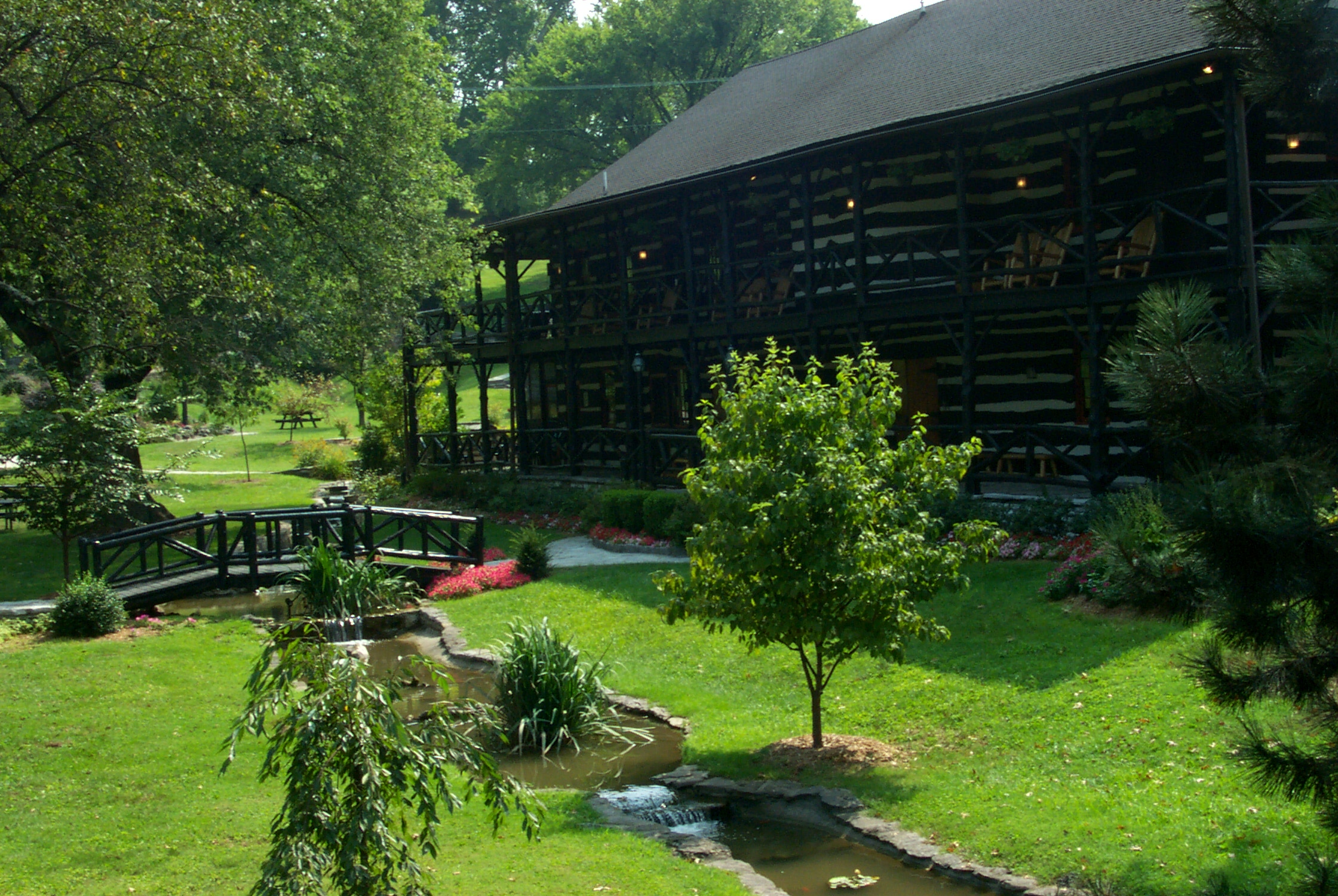
Grounds and guest house

The company claims the distillery to be the oldest continuously operating distillery in the United States. Another distillery with similar historical extent is Burks' distillery, now used for production of Maker's Mark. According to its citation in the registry of National Historic Landmarks, Burks' Distillery's origins extend to 1805, and Burks' Distillery is listed in the Guinness Book of World Records as the oldest operating bourbon distillery.

Records indicate that distilling started on the site that is now the Buffalo Trace Distillery in 1775 by Hancock Lee and his brother Willis Lee who died in 1776. The first distillery was constructed in 1812 by Harrison Blanton. In 1870 the distillery was purchased by Edmund H. Taylor Jr. and given its first name, the Old Fire Copper (O.F.C.) Distillery. Taylor sold the distillery eight years later to George T. Stagg along with the Old Oscar Pepper Distillery. This second distillery was sold within the year to James Graham, in order to add more land to the O.F.C. Distillery. In 1886, Stagg installed steam heating in the storage warehouses, the first climate controlled warehouse for aging whiskey in the nation.

During Prohibition, the distillery was allowed to remain operational, in order to make whiskey for "medicinal purposes".

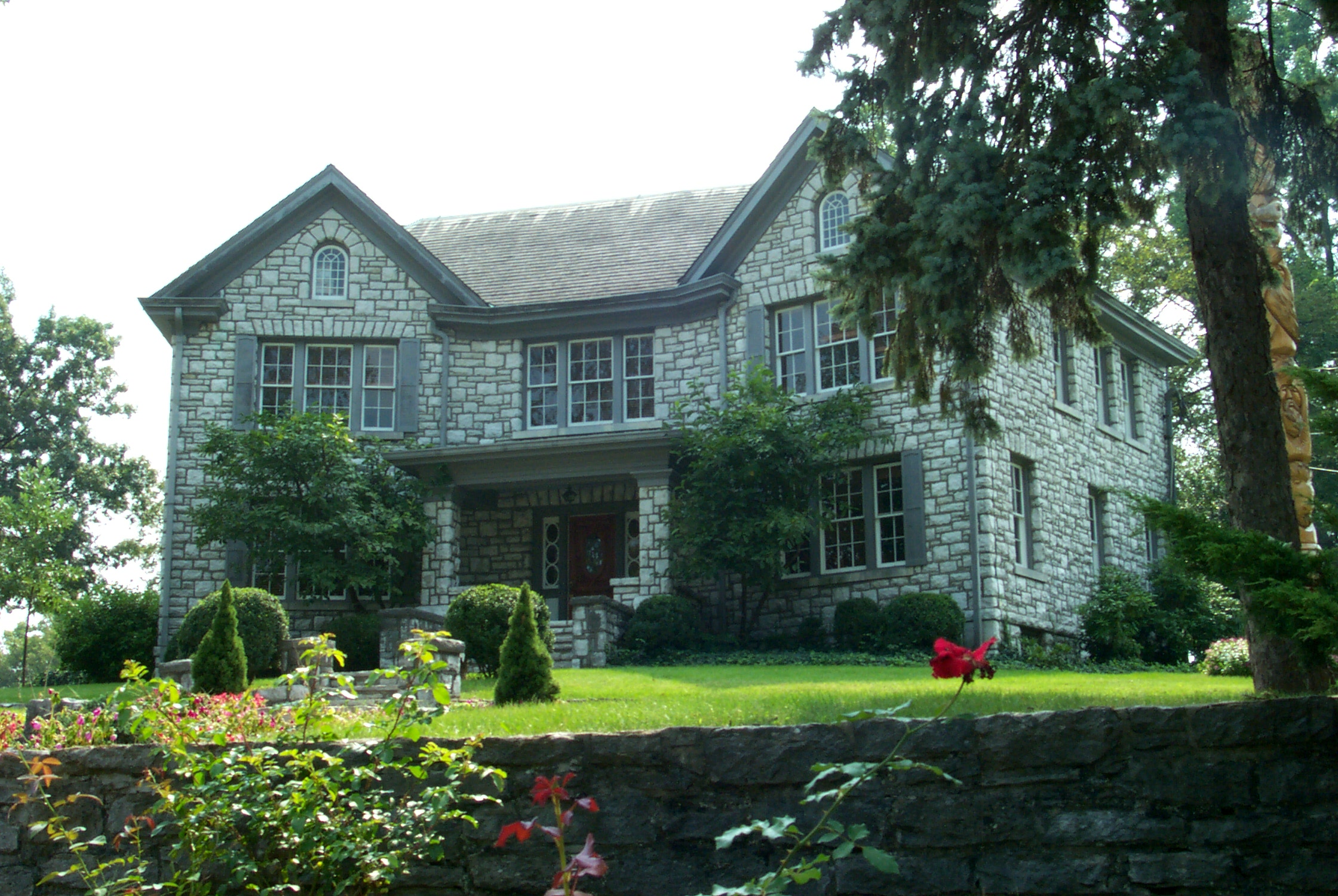
The master distiller's residence

Gary Gayheart became the master distiller in 1985, until his retirement in 2005. He was succeeded by Harlen Wheatley.

In 2016, Buffalo Trace Distillery announced plans to expand operations with a capital investment of $200 million.

In October 2016, during renovations to convert a building to a meeting and event space, workers discovered the foundation of the original 1873 distillery building, which burned down in 1882, along with the remains of fermenters from that same year. The original distillery foundation was left in place after the fire and an expanded distillery building was built as a replacement. The site is now open for visitors to Buffalo Trace.

In March 2022, Buffalo Trace Distillery announced the creation of six-litre OFC Vintage Bourbon Whiskeys, distilled in 1982, and their accompanying NFTs. The NFTs were sold on Blockbar, with the highest bid of $60,000. The sale was part of the distillery's mission to raise US$2 million for charity by donating 2,022 bottles of whiskey to fundraising causes.

== Buffalo Trace Flood 2025 ==
In early April 2025, following days of heavy rainfall exceeding 15 inches in some areas, the Kentucky River in Frankfort rose to 48.24 feet, the second highest level in Buffalo Trace Distillery's 200-year history. Significant portions of the distillery campus were submerged, prompting damage assessments and a multi-phase recovery effort. Visitor access was suspended, and a scheduled Easter event was canceled. Cleanup operations began in areas deemed safe, while broader site access remained restricted to recovery personnel.

== Production ==
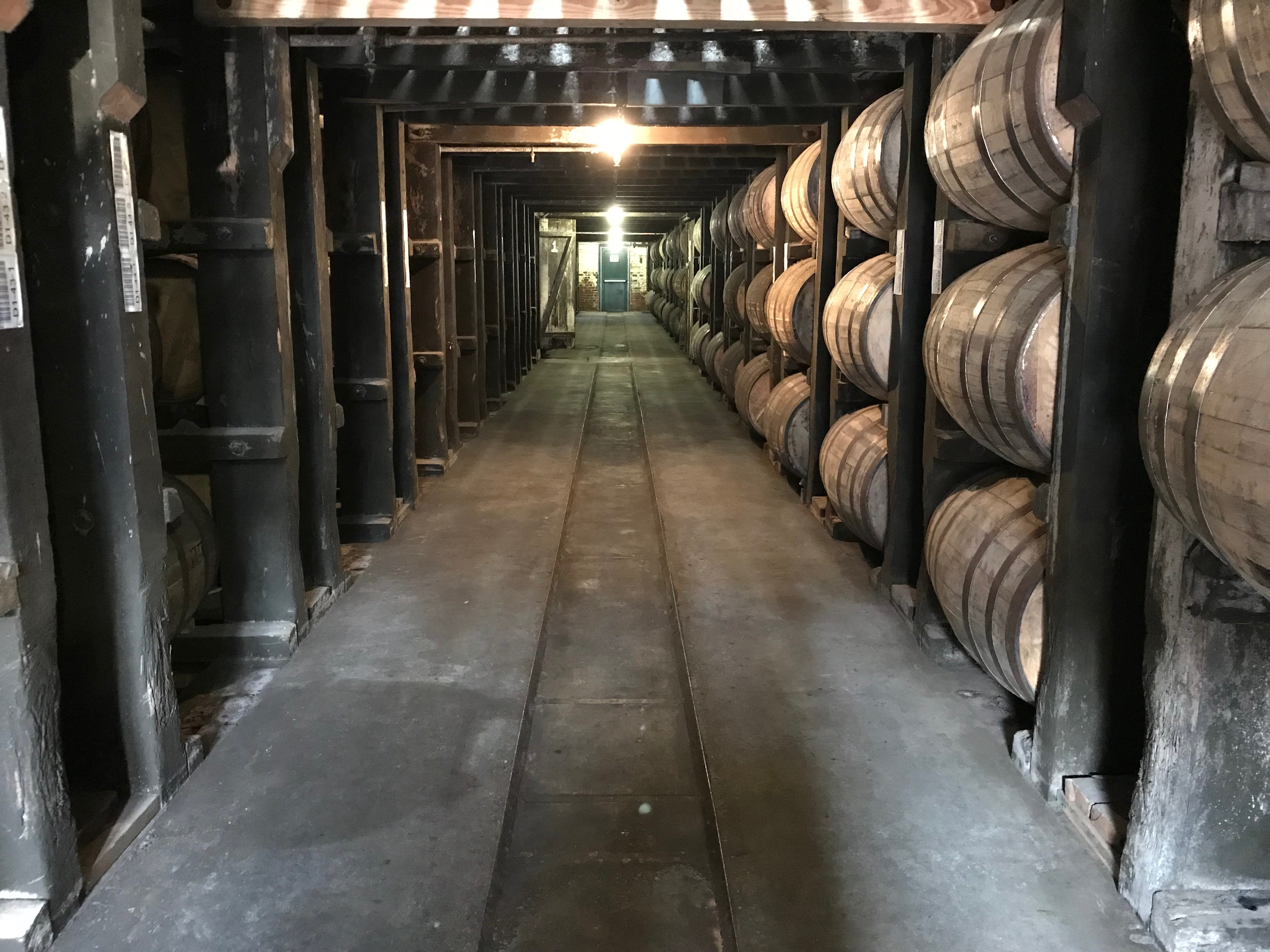
Aging warehouse

Production capacity at Buffalo Trace is estimated at 2,650,000 US gallons (10,000,000 L) of whiskey per year. This is carried out at a beer still with a capacity of 60,000 US gallons (230,000 L).

== Spirits ==
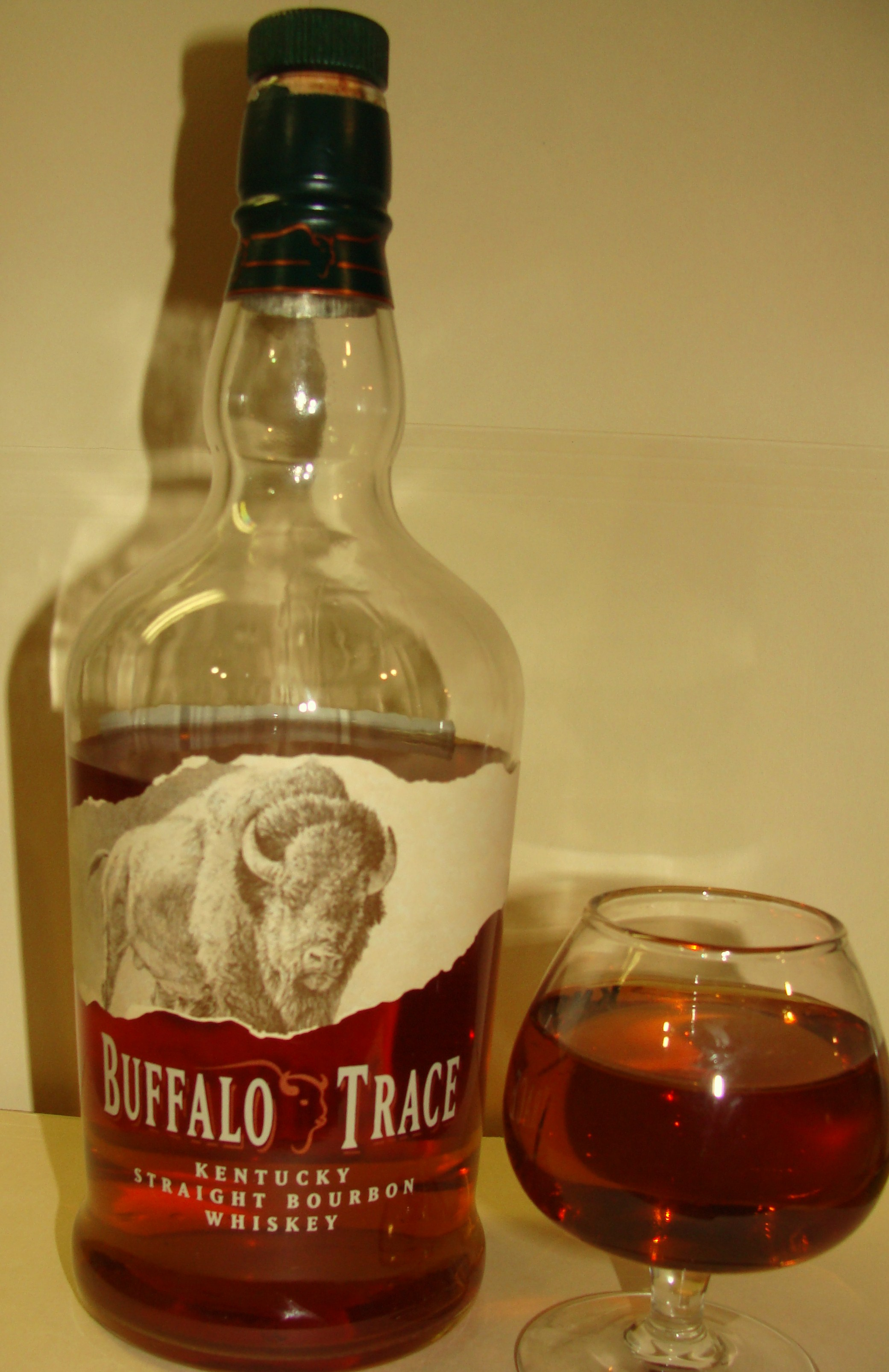
Buffalo Trace bourbon

While Buffalo Trace Distillery is mainly known for its bourbon, it also produces other spirits such as rye whiskey and vodka.

"Buffalo Trace" is also a bourbon brand made by the distillery that was introduced in August 1999, two months after the distillery changed its name from the George T. Stagg Distillery.

The following spirits are produced by Buffalo Trace Distillery:

- Self-produced brands
  - Buffalo Trace – straight bourbon (the namesake brand for the distillery, also used for branding of an Experimental Collection, Black Ridge, Single Oak Project, White Dog (unaged spirit with mash bills for bourbon, wheated bourbon, and rye), and Bourbon Cream (a cream liqueur)
  - Col. E. H. Taylor – small batch, single-barrel, and barrel proof straight bourbon and rye
  - Eagle Rare – straight bourbon and 17 year antique collection
  - George T. Stagg – barrel-proof straight bourbon (from a prior name for the distillery)
  - Stagg Jr. – barrel proof straight bourbon
  - McAfee's Benchmark – straight bourbon
  - O.F.C. – straight bourbon (from a prior name for the distillery)
  - Old Charter – straight bourbon
  - Old Taylor – straight bourbon
  - Peychaud's Bitters
  - Platinum 7X/Platinum 10X – vodka
  - Sazerac – straight rye and Sazerac antique collection
  - Thomas H. Handy – barrel-proof straight rye
  - Traveller – blended whisky in partnership with Chris Stapleton
  - W. L. Weller – special reserve, antique 107, Full Proof, 12 Year, Single Barrel, C.Y.P.B. (Craft Your Perfect Bourbon), and barrel proof William Larue Weller antique collection straight bourbon (with a wheated mash bill very similar or identical to that for the Van Winkle brands)
  - Wheatley – vodka
  - Daniel Weller Emmer Wheat – a biennial experimental release crafted from a variety of wheat strains.
- Brands produced in partnership with Age International (a former owner of the distillery, now part of the Japanese company Takara Holdings):
  - Ancient Age – straight bourbon
  - Blanton's single-barrel – straight bourbon
  - Hancock's President's Reserve – single-barrel straight bourbon
  - Elmer T. Lee – single-barrel straight bourbon
  - Rock Hill Farms – single-barrel straight bourbon
- Brands produced in partnership with the Van Winkle family (under an agreement established in June 2002):
  - Old Rip Van Winkle – straight bourbon (wheated)
  - Pappy Van Winkle's Family Reserve – straight bourbon (wheated)
  - Van Winkle Special Reserve – straight bourbon (wheated)
  - Van Winkle Family Reserve – straight rye

Buffalo Trace also produces spirits for private bottlers and store brands.

== See also ==
- List of historic whisky distilleries
