= Isaac Wolfe Bernheim =

American businessman (1848–1945)

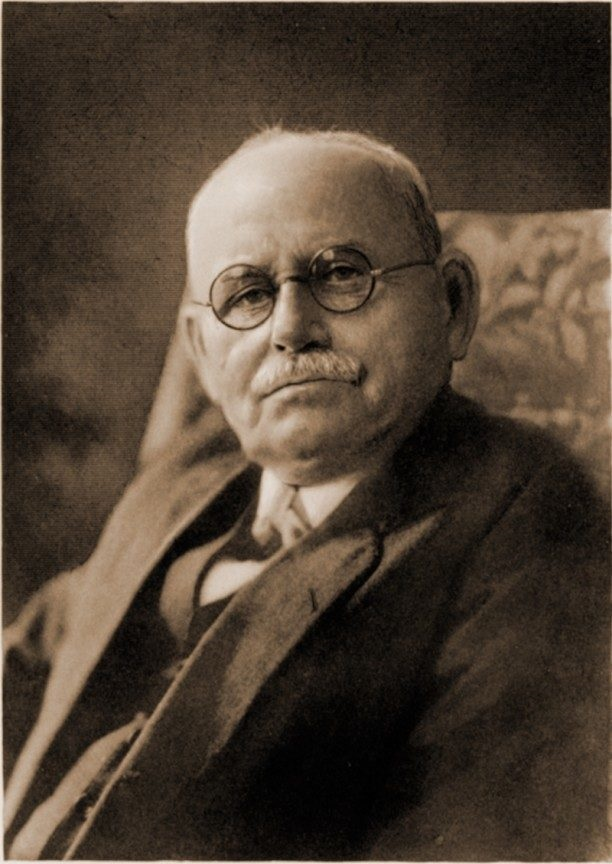
Isaac Wolfe Bernheim

Isaac Wolfe Bernheim (November 4, 1848 – April 1, 1945) was an American businessman notable for starting the I. W. Harper brand of premium bourbon whiskey (a historically important brand currently owned by Diageo). The success of his distillery and distribution business helped to consolidate the Louisville area as a major center of Kentucky bourbon distilling. Bernheim was also a philanthropist, establishing the 14,000-acre (5,700 ha; 22 sq mi) Bernheim Arboretum and Research Forest in Bullitt County.

== Early years ==
Isaac Bernheim was born in Schmieheim, Grand Duchy of Baden, now part of Kippenheim in Germany and emigrated to the United States in 1867 with $4 in his pocket. He originally planned to work in New York City. However, the company where he wanted to work went bankrupt, and he was forced to follow a different line of work. He became a traveling salesman or "peddler" traveling throughout Pennsylvania on horseback selling household items to housewives and made a respectable living. However, he was forced to stop peddling when his horse died.

== Distilling business ==
Following the death of his horse, Bernheim moved to Paducah, Kentucky, where he worked as a bookkeeper for a wholesale liquor company, Loeb, Bloom, & Co. He was able to save enough money to bring his brother Bernard to America. He quickly moved on, however, and with the help of his brother Bernard Bernheim and their friend Elbridge Palmer as a silent partner, he was able to open up his own liquor sales firm called Bernheim Brothers in 1872.

In 1875, Palmer's interest in the business was bought out and Isaac's brother-in-law Nathan Uri (the brother of Isaac's wife Amanda) became a partner in the business, and the company was renamed as Bernheim Brothers & Uri. Because of their business's proximity to large waterways, the company grew rapidly.

Bernheim Brothers & Uri moved its operations from Paducah to Louisville (on Main Street between 1st and 2nd) in 1888, and Uri left the business in 1889. The company then continued under its prior firm name of Bernheim Brothers and continued to expand.

Bernheim Brothers bought the Pleasure Ridge Park Distillery in Louisville and it began operating as the Bernheim Distillery. In March 1896, the distillery's bonded warehouse at Pleasure Ridge Park, which it shared jointly with another whiskey business, was destroyed by fire. The loss of the property itself was covered by insurance, but the cost of the unpaid whiskey tax on the lost product proved difficult to settle for the business – the matter was not settled until near the end of 1897. The courts eventually ruled that the tax was not due since the whiskey had been destroyed by the fire before it was sold. The company's new distillery plant (on the north side of Main Street, near 2nd) began operating in April 1897.

=== I. W. Harper ===
The company began the production of an elite whiskey brand it called "I. W. Harper". (The "I. W." in the name may have been an abbreviation for "Isaac Wolfe", with a different surname chosen for marketability.) During the Prohibition era in the U.S. (1920–1933), Bernheim Brothers was one of only ten distilleries allowed to continue to make bourbon, as they had received a license to produce it for medicinal purposes.

A few years after Prohibition ended, Bernheim sold the business to the Schenley Distilling Corporation (in 1937).

== Community activity ==
Isaac Bernheim became a notable philanthropist in Louisville. He established the Bernheim Arboretum and Research Forest on 14,000 acres (5,700 ha; 22 sq mi) in Bullitt County, 25 miles (40 km) south of Louisville and 5 miles (8.0 km) from Shepherdsville in 1929. He purchased the land in 1928 at $1 an acre ($247/km^{2}) – the low price being because most of it had been stripped for mining iron ore. The Frederick Law Olmsted landscape architecture firm started work on designing the park in 1931 and it opened in 1950. Bernheim Forest was given to the people of Kentucky in trust and it is the largest privately owned natural area in the state. Bernheim, and his first wife, Amanda are buried at the Bernheim Forest. After Amanda died, Bernheim married her sister, Emma Uri Levy. They lived in Denver, Colorado. The memorial "Let there Be Light" by George Bernard Grey sits over their final resting place. Bernheim's daughter and son-in-law were buried in the forest as well as several other family members.

Bernheim was a prominent member of the Jewish community, and was active in the Union of American Hebrew Congregations and the American Jewish Committee. He donated to establish the first library at the Hebrew Union College in Cincinnati. In Louisville, he funded the first home for the Young Men's Hebrew Association and funded an addition to the Jewish Hospital. Bernheim, an adherent of Reform Judaism, continues to have great-grandchildren who follow in his footsteps in the continuation of the Reform Movement and philanthropic activity. In 2007 in his honor, his granddaughter Amanda Roth Block donated to the Hebrew Union College in New York City to President Rabbi David Ellenson a lithograph, "Moses and the Burning Bush", which was inspired by her grandfather's dedication to the Reform movement. Bernheim's library at the Hebrew Union College was renovated to be the home of priceless documents and rare Torah scrolls.

Bernheim also financed two statues installed in the statuary hall of the U.S. Capitol, making them the only two statues there to be privately purchased. In addition, he financed a statue of Abraham Lincoln outside the main branch of the Louisville Free Public Library and the statue of Thomas Jefferson outside the Jefferson County courthouse.

Upon visiting his hometown of Schmieheim, Germany in the early 20th century, he discovered the village had no running water, and made a large contribution to improve the situation, enabling the town to install its first plumbing system. He also built a home for the elderly and a home for children.

== The modern Bernheim distillery and brands ==
In 1992, a large distilling plant called the Bernheim Distillery was opened in Louisville (on West Breckinridge Street near Dixie Highway) by United Distillers, which was owned by Guinness. United owned the I. W. Harper brand at the time the distillery was opened, but it had cheapened the quality of the brand in the U.S. market, focusing instead on Asia and Europe (especially Japan, where the product became a top brand of bourbon). They then took the brand off the U.S. market entirely. United became Diageo in 1997 when Guinness merged with Grand Metropolitan, and Diageo continues to own the brand but no longer owns the distillery. The modern Bernheim distillery is not to be confused with the prior Bernheim distillery sites.

The Bernheim distillery was purchased by Heaven Hill Distilleries in 1999, and it was substantially refurbished to become Heaven Hill's main distilling plant. Heaven Hill purchased the site after a 1996 fire destroyed its prior distilling plant in Bardstown.

In March 2015, after the brand had been off the U.S. market for 20 years, Diageo announced that it was reintroducing the I. W. Harper brand in April 2015, using spirits distilled at the new Bernheim distillery, aged partly at the Stitzel-Weller warehouses, and bottled at Diageo's George Dickel plant in Tullahoma, Tennessee. However, as of February 2017, the brand is not listed as a current product on the Diageo web site and the brand's web site hasn't been updated since March 2015.

The Bernheim Original wheat whiskey brand introduced by Heaven Hill in 2005 was also named after the Bernheim brothers, the distilling company they founded, and the modern distillery that bears their name.

== Written works ==
- The Story of the Bernheim Family (1910)
- The Closing Chapters of a Busy Life (1929)
