= Old Charter =

Bourbon whiskey brand from Frankfort, Kentucky

Old Charter Bourbon whiskey
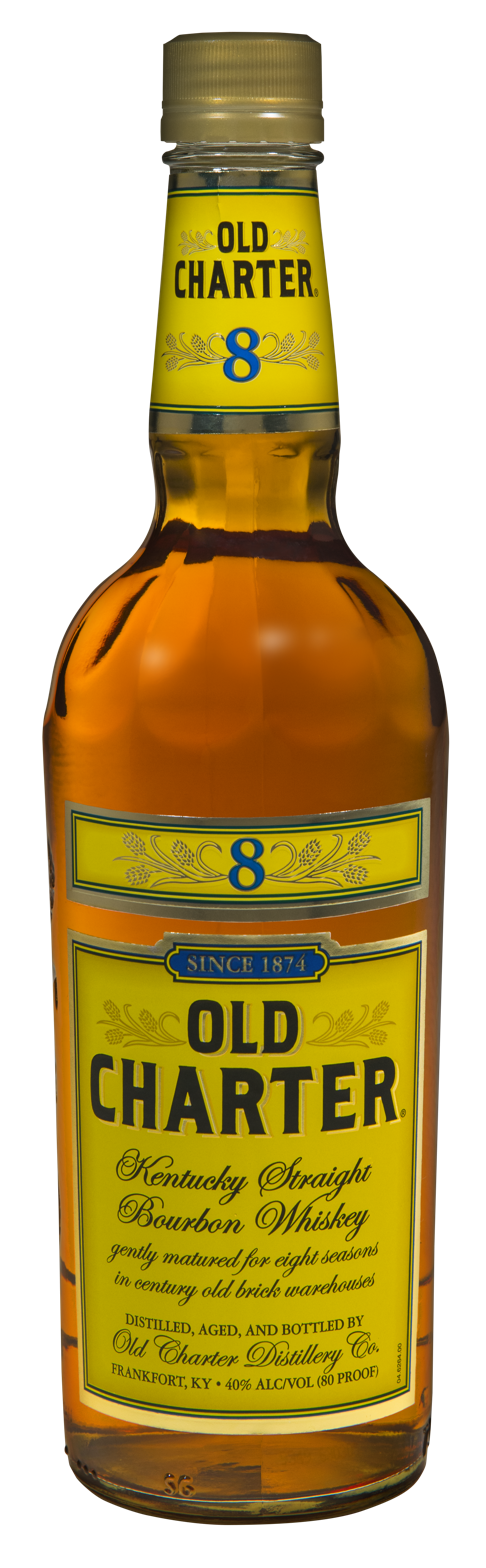
- Post-2014 labeling
- Type: Bourbon whiskey
- Manufacturer: Sazerac Company
- Origin: Kentucky, United States
- Introduced: 1874
- Alcohol by volume: 40.00%
- Proof (US): 80
- Related products: Buffalo Trace

Old Charter is a brand of bourbon whiskey distilled in Frankfort, Kentucky at the Buffalo Trace Distillery, a part of the Sazerac Company. The whiskey is no longer aged 8 years, despite the claim on the label that it "is gently matured for eight seasons in century old brick warehouses." In 2018 Sazerac is facing a class action false advertising lawsuit because of the claim on the label.

== Early history ==
The Old Charter brand was established in 1874 by Adam and Benjamin Chapeze, brothers operating under the name A. B. Chapeze, who were operating a distillery on the Bardstown branch of the L&N Railroad. Ben Chapeze traveled and pushed the brand and made it well known while his brother Adam managed the operation. Eventually sales were assigned under contract to Wright & Taylor, a Louisville wholesale house operated by John J. Wright and Marion E. Taylor.

Packaging as bottled in 1929

== After prohibition ==
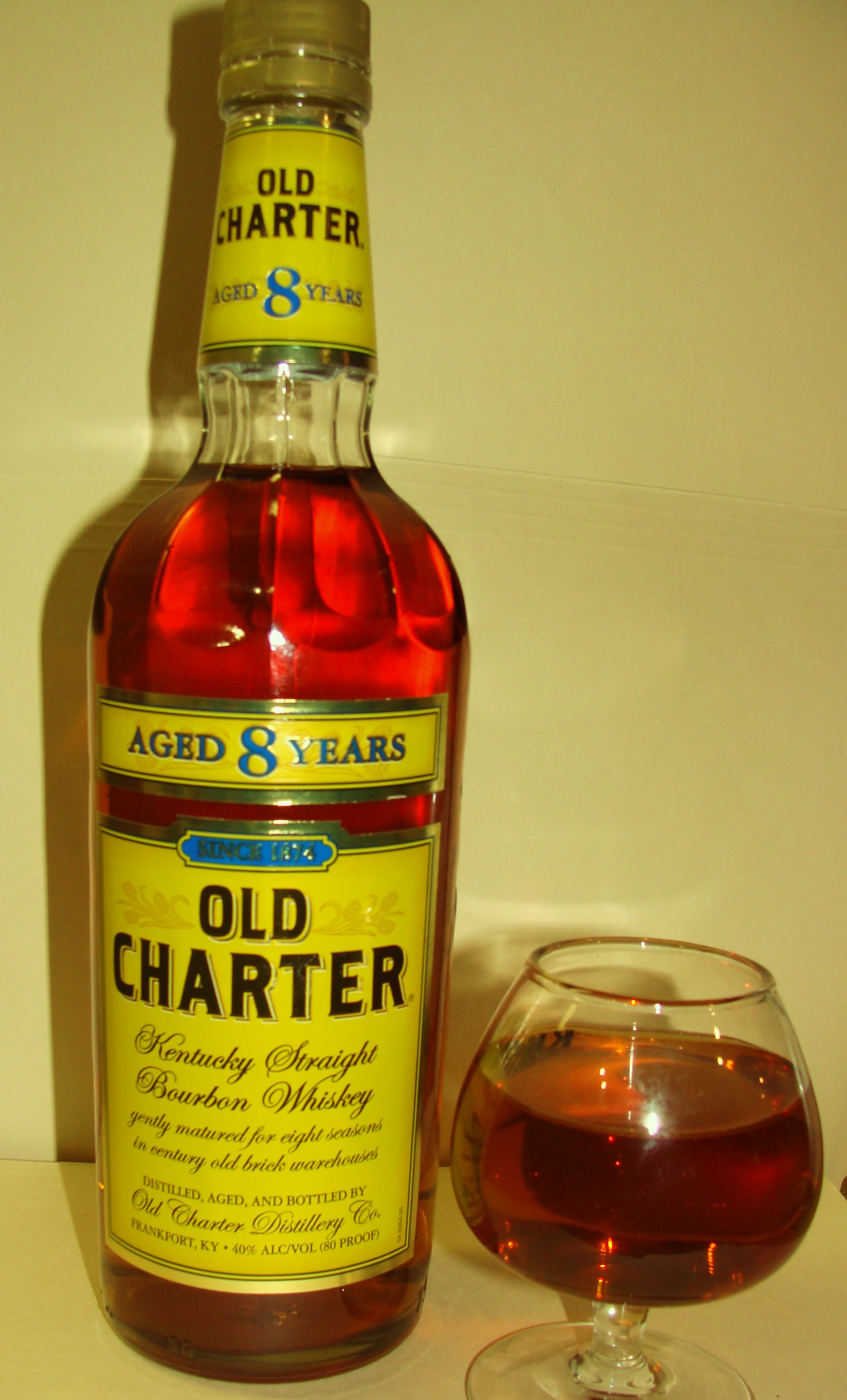
Pre-2014 labelling

In 1933, the Bernheim distillery acquired the Old Charter Brand and all of its bourbon stock from Wright & Taylor, but did not start selling the brand using that stock until the stock was fully aged for bond in 1937. Wright and Taylor also used the Old Charter brand name for their remaining pre-prohibition bourbon stock. In 1937, the two majority owners of Bernheim, Gerngross and Schwarzhaupt, sold out to Schenley Distilleries. The brand names sold at that time included Old Charter, Cascade, and Echo Springs. In 1974, the 1,000,000th barrel of Old Charter was bottled and a case was given by the Governor of Kentucky (Wendell Ford) to the Governor of Texas (Dolph Briscoe) as a gift. In 1987, United Distillers acquired Schenley. In 1999, the Old Charter brand was purchased by the Sazerac Company from Diageo.

== False advertising suit ==
Until January 2014 Old Charter sold a product that was aged 8 years and displayed "aged 8 years" prominently on the label, as well as stating that the whiskey "is gently matured for eight seasons in century old brick warehouses."

In January 2014 the product was reformulated using "non-age stated" (NAS) bourbon. In place of "aged 8 years" the label simply printed a large 8. The phrase "is gently matured for eight seasons in century old brick warehouses" was also retained.
