= Hancock's President's Reserve =

- Type: Bourbon whiskey
- Manufacturer: The Sazerac Company
- Origin: Kentucky, United States
- Alcohol by volume: 44.45%
- Proof (US): 88.9
- Related products: Buffalo Trace

Hancock's President's Reserve Bourbon Whiskey is a single barrel bourbon whiskey produced in Frankfort, Kentucky by the Sazerac Company at Buffalo Trace Distillery. The brand is sold as a straight bourbon in 750ml glass bottles.

Hancock's President's Reserve is named after the early American settler Hancock Lee.
