= Loretto, Kentucky =

- City
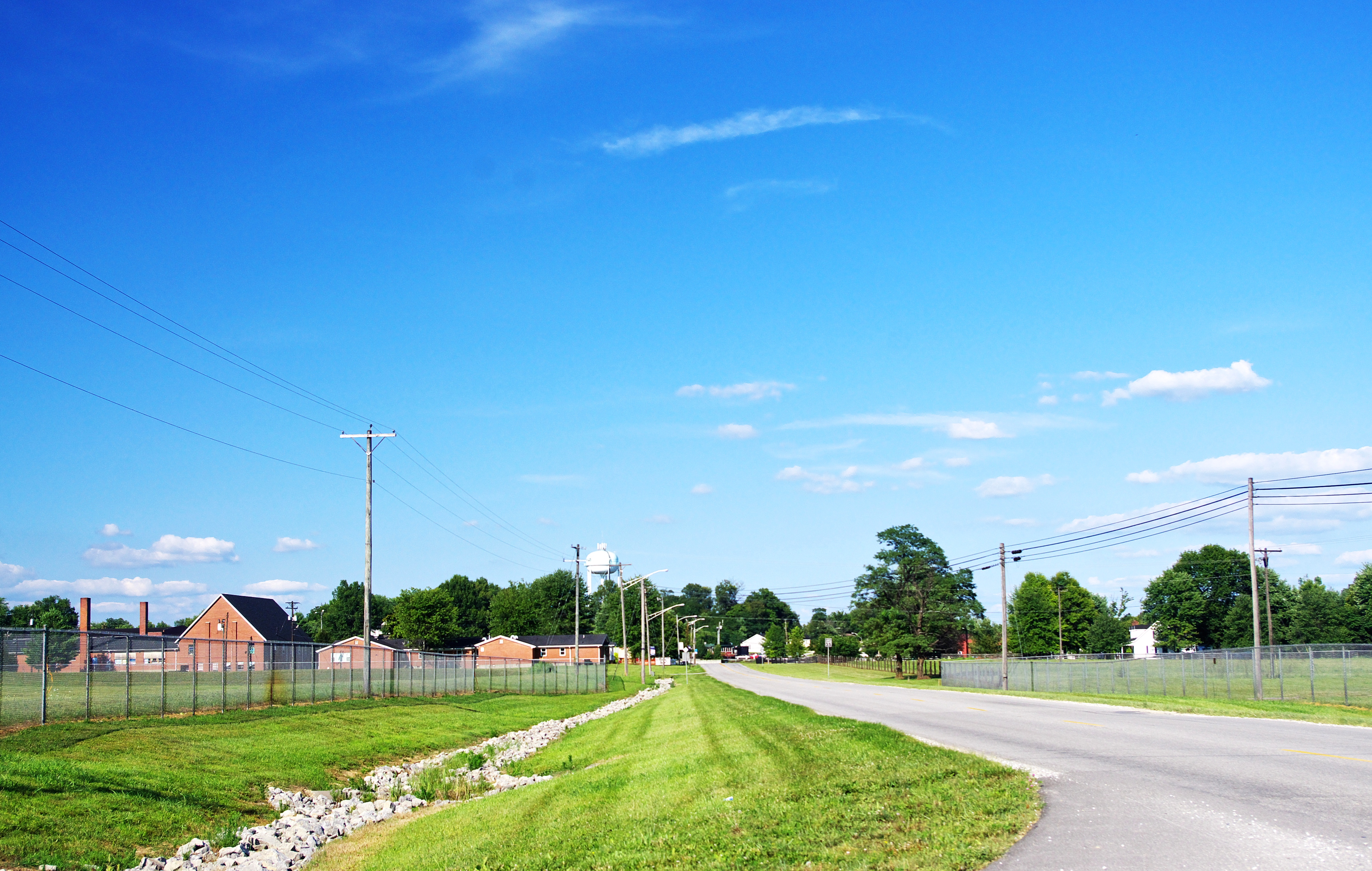
- Kentucky Route 52 in Loretto

- Location in Marion County, Kentucky
- Coordinates: 37°38′8″N 85°23′12″W
- Country: United States
- State: Kentucky
- County: Marion
- Incorporated: 1866
- Named for: a local Catholic sisterhood

Area
  - Total: 3.22 sq mi (8.34 km^{2})
  - Land: 3.19 sq mi (8.26 km^{2})
  - Water: 0.031 sq mi (0.08 km^{2})
- Elevation: 738 ft (225 m)

Population (2020)
  - Total: 723
  - Density: 226.7/sq mi (87.54/km^{2})
- Time zone: UTC-5 (Eastern (EST))
  - Summer (DST): UTC-4 (EDT)
- ZIP code: 40037
- Area codes: 270 & 364
- FIPS code: 21-47710
- GNIS feature ID: 0497170

Loretto is a home rule-class city in Marion County, Kentucky, United States. The population was 723 at the 2020 census. It is best known as the home of the Maker's Mark bourbon distillery.

== History ==
The city takes its name from the Sisters of Loretto, a Catholic congregation founded in 1812 at nearby St. Mary. The sisters themselves were named for Loreto in Italy, the site of the Basilica della Santa Casa which supposedly contains the original home of the Virgin Mary.

The sisters began a school at the site to educate the frontier children. By 1833, the community was large enough for its own post office. It was formally incorporated in 1866.

The Maker's Mark distillery in Loretto is rooted in a distillery established by Charles Burks in the early 19th century, and drastically expanded by his descendants in the late 1880s. The distillery was purchased by Bill Samuels in 1953, and the brand was renamed "Maker's Mark". The distillery, located 3 miles (5 km) east of Loretto, is listed on the National Register of Historic Places, and has been designated a National Historic Landmark. Its prominent barrel warehouses are concentrated in the western part of Loretto.

== Geography ==
Loretto is located in northwestern Marion County at 37°38′8″N 85°23′12″W (37.635576, -85.386601). According to the United States Census Bureau, the city has a total area of 3.2 square miles (8.3 km^{2}), of which 0.03 square miles (0.08 km^{2}), or 1.02%, are water. The city is concentrated around the intersection of Kentucky Route 52 and Kentucky Route 49, 10 miles (16 km) northwest of Lebanon, 13 miles (21 km) southwest of Springfield, and 15 miles (24 km) south of Bardstown.

== Demographics ==
Historical population
Census	Pop.	Note	%±
1870	42		—
1880	129		207.1%
1970	985		—
1980	954		−3.1%
1990	820		−14.0%
2000	623		−24.0%
2010	713		14.4%
2020	723		1.4%
U.S. Decennial Census

As of the census of 2000, there were 623 people, 252 households, and 172 families residing in the city. The population density was 177.2 per square mile (68.4/km^{2}). There were 269 housing units at an average density of 76.5 per square mile (29.5/km^{2}). The racial makeup of the city was 99.52% White, and 0.48% from two or more races. Hispanic or Latino of any race were 0.16% of the population.

There were 252 households, out of which 28.2% had children under the age of 18 living with them, 53.2% were married couples living together, 11.5% had a female householder with no husband present, and 31.7% were non-families. 29.0% of all households were made up of individuals, and 15.5% had someone living alone who was 65 years of age or older. The average household size was 2.47 and the average family size was 3.01.

24.7% of the population was under the age of 18, 9.0% from 18 to 24, 27.4% from 25 to 44, 24.7% from 45 to 64, and 14.1% who were 65 years of age or older. The median age was 36 years. For every 100 females, there were 103.6 males. For every 100 females age 18 and over, there were 97.1 males.

The median income for a household in the city was $30,000, and the median income for a family was $34,792. Males had a median income of $28,750 versus $20,972 for females. The per capita income for the city was $12,854. About 10.8% of families and 12.9% of the population were below the poverty line, including 14.6% of those under age 18 and 10.5% of those age 65 or over.
