= Amanda Roth Block =

American artist (1912–2011)

Amanda R. Block (February 20, 1912 – November 8, 2011) was an American artist. Born in Louisville, Kentucky, Block studied art in Cincinnati, Ohio, and exhibited sculptures at her first national show at the Chicago Art Institute in 1941. Her graduation from John Herron School of Art in 1960, at age 48, marked a return to creative work. Her superb color sense has always been Amanda's trademark.

The figural work of Block, her most accessible, falls between the traditional and the avant-garde, between simple and subtle, between passion and control. Although she became well known for her large abstract landscapes in acrylic and her lithographs from the middle and late 1970s; ultimately, she is most well known for her figure work. Her primary subjects of her figure work are women.

== History ==
Block was born into a prominent Jewish family, Block attended Smith College, but dropped out to marry in 1931. She soon began attending classes at the Art Academy of Cincinnati, Ohio, and exhibited for the first time, sculpture, at the Art Institute of Chicago in 1941. Then, during World War II, and Block found herself in Ft. Sill, Oklahoma, for the duration of the war. There, her only child, JG Wolf, was born.

Child-rearing and divorce occupied her until she was able to return to art school during the middle and late fifties. Her real work began in 1960 upon graduation from John Herron Art School in Indianapolis, Indiana, where she lived with her second husband, Maurice Block Jr., a successful department store executive, who eventually became the President of the William H Block department stores.

From 1960 until 1984 she produced hundreds of prints, paintings, drawings, and mixed media images, at which point she retired from active production. She had many shows, purchases by museums and private collectors. Additionally during this time, she taught drawing and lithography at John Herron, where she was thought to be a gifted and talented instructor.

== Paintings ==
Block's large, abstract expressionist paintings were the cornerstone of her success in the late sixties and seventies. These large paintings sold very well at the time and adorned the walls of a large number of buildings and institutions of the day. Traditionally abstract expressionist and very much in the mainstream of painting at the time, these large canvasses today have the effect of anchoring the viewer firmly in the times.

Spending several weeks each winter in Tucson, Arizona, with her husband, Maurice Block Jr., Amanda grew to love the desert landscapes and strong visual attributes of the area. The desert and its impact upon her became a common theme. She often did rough watercolors there, trying to capture the feeling and color palette of the unique place. Unfortunately, these studies do not survive, but their impact clearly inform her large abstract landscapes.

Commentators have noted that Amanda's use of color contributes to the impact of her work. Her subjects often include landscapes geography associated with broad geographic themes, such as mountains, seas, lakes, rivers, forests, and deserts.

== Figural and landscape lithography ==
A lithographer of some renown – Block taught stone lithography at John Herron for a number of years—the artist felt very comfortable in printmaking. Her press was for two decades the only private lithograph press in the state of Indiana, donated to John Herron for her students upon her retirement.

Eschewing the often blocky and repetitive style of her contemporaries, not interested in the facile or geometrical designs running through the art of the day, Block's prints fall vaguely into two categories. Figural art and landscape art, the two most common themes throughout all her work. Of the two, the figural pieces sing connect with today's art perception. A lover of beauty, it is the female form that most stimulated Amanda's sensibilities. Broad swaths of color force the viewer to confront the subject on her own terms. These are realistic representations of women, with raw feelings.

Block's editions are small, seldom more than a dozen prints per edition. Often however, each print required a dozen or more printings to layer the colors one upon the other, finally realizing the image Amanda required. Her washes are finely controlled and the juxtaposition between wash and line builds a tension that adds a third dimension to the effect.

== Drawings and watercolors ==
Block believed that drawing was the most important of the artist's tools. As a drawing instructor at John Herron she always remained true to traditional principles and classic approaches to realizing the subject. Her subject, the one with which she most surely resonated, was the female form, and through it the vision and sensuality of the woman.

Block drew from life every week of her working career; and these drawings, originally intended to be studies and practice works, eventually became finished works in themselves. As her color sense and courage expanded she began laying broad swaths of color on her drawings. The results are definitive and unique, colorful and unabashedly sensual, in some cases verging toward erotic.

== See also ==
- Isaac Wolfe Bernheim, Block's grandfather
