= Bernheim Original =

American whiskey brand

- Type: Wheat whiskey
- Manufacturer: Heaven Hill
- Origin: Kentucky, United States
- Alcohol by volume: 45.00%
- Proof (US): 90
- Related products: Heaven Hill

Bernheim Original is a wheat whiskey produced in Bardstown, Kentucky by Heaven Hill Distilleries. It is sold in glass in 16 oz pint bottles, glass 750ml bottles, glass 1-liter bottles. A relatively inexpensive whiskey, it compares to the rarer and more expensive Pappy Van Winkle.
