= Maker's Mark =

Brand of bourbon whisky

- Maker's Mark
- Type: Bourbon whisky
- Manufacturer: Suntory Global Spirits
- Origin: Loretto, Kentucky, U.S. 37°38′52″N 85°20′56″W
- Introduced: 1958
- Alcohol by volume: 45%
- Proof (US): 90
- Related products: Jim Beam
- Website: makersmark.com

Maker's Mark is a small-batch bourbon whisky produced in Loretto, Kentucky, by Suntory Global Spirits. It is bottled at 90 U.S. proof (45% alcohol by volume) and sold in squarish bottles sealed with red wax. The distillery offers tours and is part of the American Whiskey Trail and the Kentucky Bourbon Trail.

== History ==
Maker's Mark's origin began when T. William "Bill" Samuels Sr., purchased the Burks' Distillery in Loretto, Kentucky, for $35,000 on October 1, 1953. Production began in 1954, and the first run was bottled in 1958 under the brand's dipped red wax seal (U.S. trademark serial number 73526578).

In the 1960s and 1970s, Maker's Mark was widely marketed with the tag line, "It tastes expensive ... and is."

The distillery was listed on the National Register of Historic Places on December 31, 1974, and designated a National Historic Landmark on December 16, 1980, listed as "Burks' Distillery", the first distillery in America to be recognized while the landmark buildings were in active production.

Maker's Mark was sold to Hiram Walker & Sons in 1981, which was acquired by the distillery giant Seagram in 1987. In 2001, after Seagram's collapse, Allied-Domecq acquired Makers Mark. When Allied-Domecq was bought by Pernod Ricard in 2005, the Maker's Mark brand was sold to Deerfield, Illinois–based Fortune Brands. Fortune Brands split in 2011, with its alcoholic beverage business becoming Beam Inc.

After the brand's creation by Bill Samuels Sr., its production was overseen by his son Bill Samuels Jr. until 2011 when he announced his retirement as president and CEO at the age of 70. His son Rob Samuels succeeded him in April 2011.

On February 9, 2013, the company sent a mass email announcing a plan to reduce the alcohol strength of the whiskey, citing supply issues as the reason for the change. The result of this change would have been to reduce the product from 90 U.S. proof (45% alcohol by volume) to 84 U.S. proof (42% abv), which would have stretched inventory by about 6%. Maker's Mark said that their own tasting panel of distillery employees reported no taste difference in the lower proof, while industry analysts said that the difference would be subtle, and since most drinkers mix the bourbon or serve it on ice, few would be able to notice it. According to Neil Irwin for The Washington Post's Wonkblog, the decision can be explained by Beam's desire to keep Maker's Mark competitive as a premium bourbon at mid-range bars, and a well drink among high-end bars.

On February 17, the company said that it had reconsidered its decision after receiving a strong negative reaction from customers, and that it would continue to bottle at the original strength. Some overseas markets like Australia will continue to sell the whiskey at 40%.

In January 2014, Beam Inc. announced its sale to Suntory, creating Beam Suntory, the third largest distilled spirits maker in the world. News of the proposed sale included bourbon executives vowing "the product taste won't change – and neither will the company's historic purity standards."

In 2014, Maker's Mark released a Cask Strength Bourbon in limited quantities initially available to consumers only at their distillery gift shop. Proof fluctuates each batch between 53% and 58% abv. The product was released on the global market in July 2016.

In November 2015 Beam Suntory announced a major expansion of the distillery.

In November 2018, Dave Pickerell, who served as master distiller, died at 62 years old. Pickerell was called the "Johnny Appleseed of American Whiskey".

In June 2019, the company announced it would begin selling Maker's Mark 101, bottled at 101 U.S. proof, at their distillery. The higher proof bourbon was first introduced at duty-free airport shops in 2018.

In May 2024, Maker's Mark owner, Beam Suntory, was re-branded as Suntory Global Spirits including the launch of a new website and visual identity.

== About the bourbon ==
- Burks' Distillery
- U.S. National Register of Historic Places
- U.S. National Historic Landmark
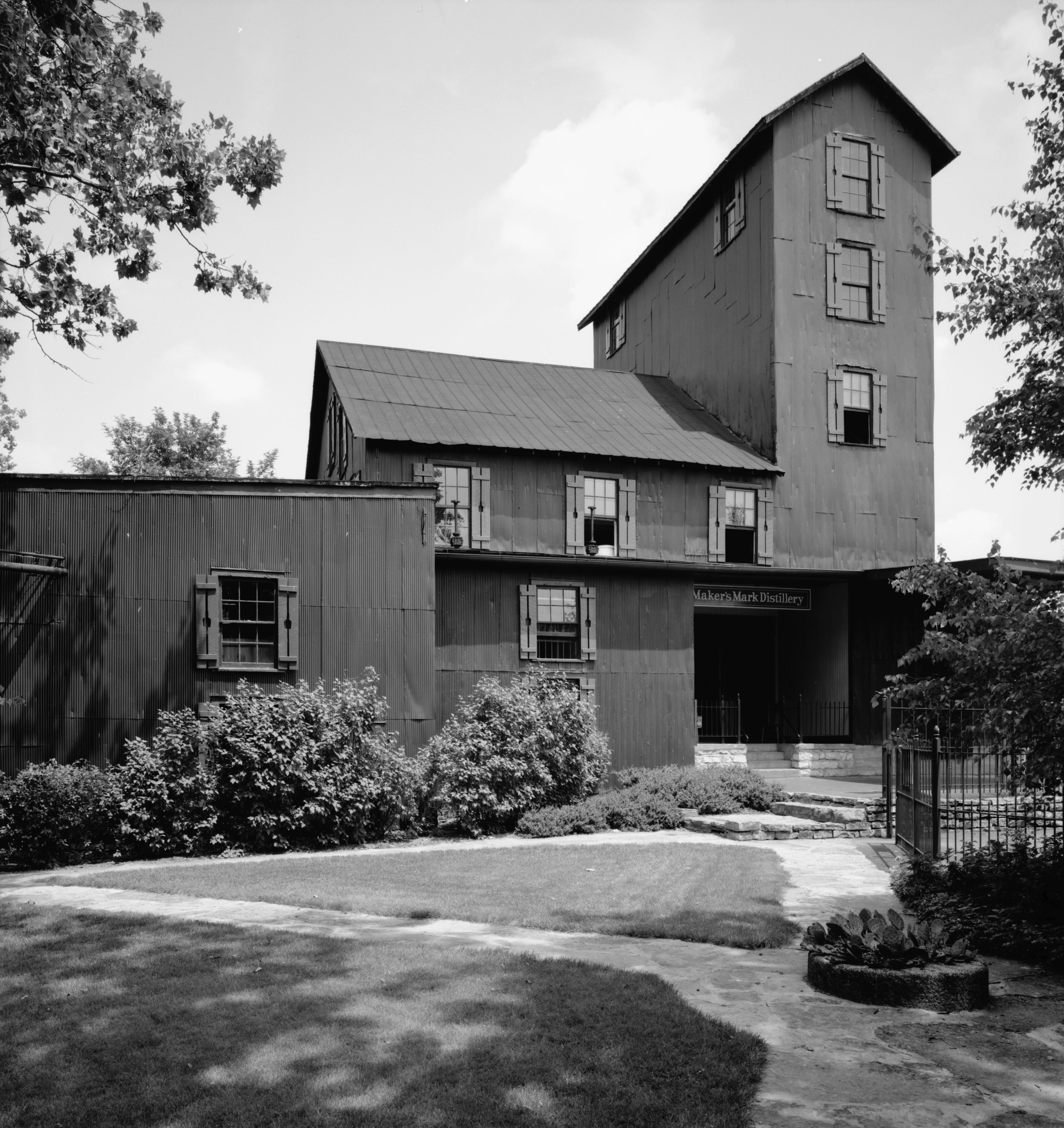
- Historic Distillery

- Location within Kentucky Location within the United States
- Nearest city: Loretto, Kentucky
- Area: 36 acres (15 ha)
- Built: 1889
- Architect: George R. Burks
- NRHP reference No.: 74000893

Significant dates
- Added to NRHP: December 31, 1974
- Designated NHL: January 16, 1980

Maker's Mark is unusual in that no rye is used as part of the mash. Instead of rye Maker's Mark uses red winter wheat (16%), corn (70%) and malted barley (14%) in the mash bill.

During the planning phase of Maker's Mark, Samuels allegedly developed seven candidate mash bills for the new bourbon. As he did not have time to distill and age each one for tasting, he instead made a loaf of bread from each recipe and the one with no rye was judged the best tasting. Samuels also received considerable assistance and recipes from Stitzel-Weller owner Pappy Van Winkle, whose distillery produced the wheated Old Fitzgerald and W. L. Weller bourbons.

Maker's Mark is aged for around six years, being bottled and marketed when the company's tasters agree that it is ready. Maker's Mark is one of the few distillers to rotate the barrels from the upper to the lower levels of the aging warehouses during the aging process to even out the differences in temperature during the process. The upper floors are exposed to the greatest temperature variations during the year, so rotating the barrels ensures that the bourbon in all the barrels has the same quality and taste.

Maker's Mark is marketed as a small batch Bourbon. Most producers of so-called small batch Bourbons do not clarify exactly what they mean by the term. The producer of Maker's Mark says that the traditional definition is "A bourbon that is produced/distilled in small quantities of approximately 1,000 gallons or less (20 barrels) from a mash bill of around 200 bushels of grain".

Maker's Mark is sold in squarish bottles that are sealed with red wax. T. William Samuels' wife, Marjorie "Margie" Samuels, gave the whiskey its name, drew its label, and thought up the wax dipping that gives the bottle its distinctive look. It was introduced to the market in 1959.

Three varieties are marketed: the original, bottled at 90 U.S. proof (45% alcohol by volume); a mint julep flavor with green wax on the neck released seasonally in limited amounts; and Maker's 46 (47% alcohol by volume), a variety flavored by introducing seared French oak staves into the traditional charred white oak barrel toward the end of its aging. As of 2021, Maker's Mark is now available at up to 57% alcohol content (114 proof).

Maker's Mark is, along with George Dickel and Old Forester, one of a handful of American-made whiskies that uses the Scottish spelling "whisky" rather than the predominant American "whiskey".

== Bourbon House & Lounge ==
Maker's Mark Bourbon House and Lounge in Fourth Street Live!, Downtown Louisville

Maker's Mark began creating branded restaurants with the late 2004 / early 2005 opening of Maker's Mark Bourbon House & Lounge in the Fourth Street Live! entertainment complex in Downtown Louisville, Kentucky. In addition to serving Maker's Mark it features bourbons from each of Kentucky's distilleries.

A second such establishment opened in Kansas City, Missouri's downtown Power & Light District in 2008, and a third at the Indiana Live Casino in Shelbyville, Indiana just outside Indianapolis in March, 2009.

== Reviews ==
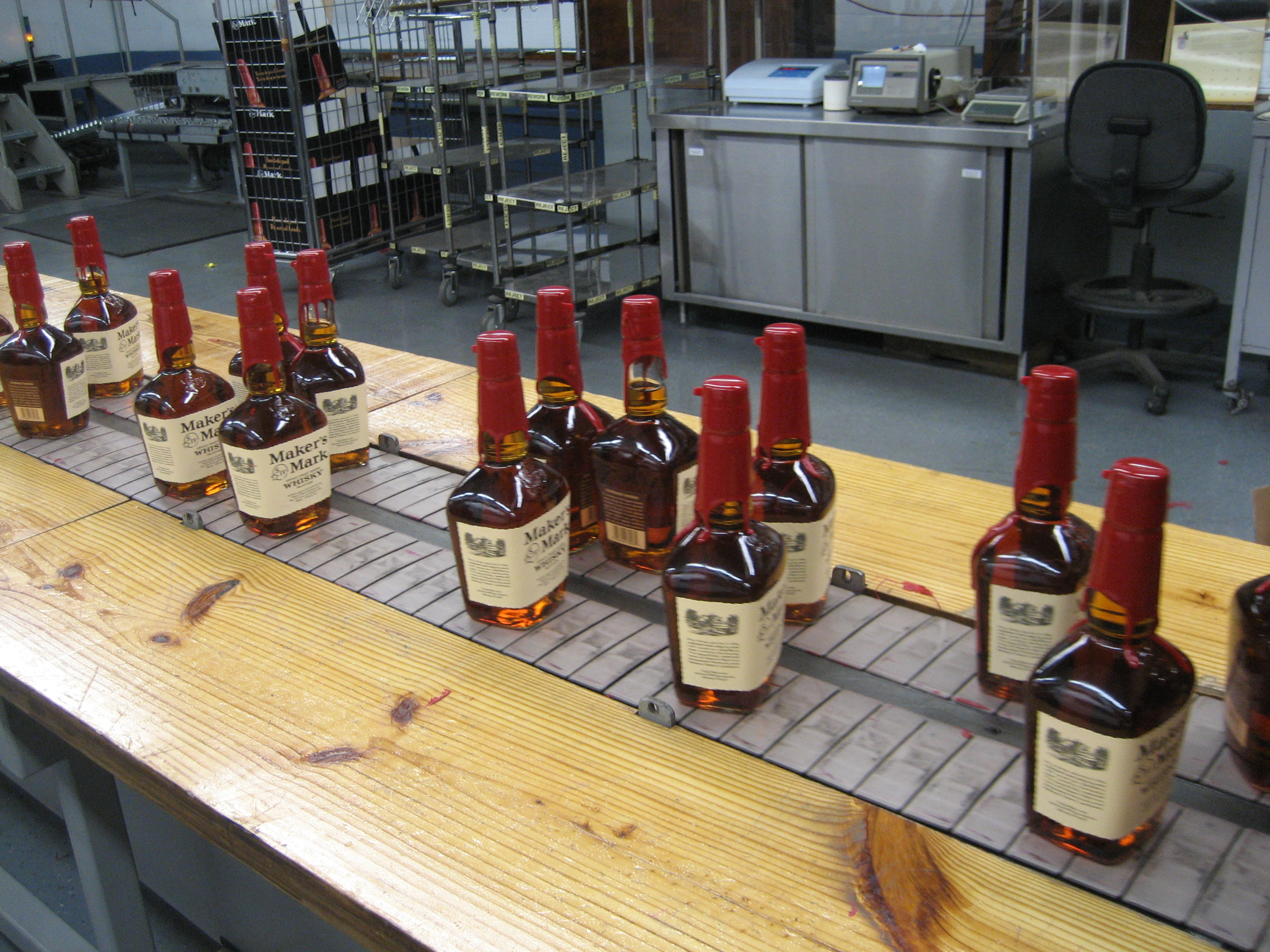
The production line at the Maker's Mark distillery in Loretto, Kentucky

Maker's Mark bourbon has earned solid marks at international Spirits ratings competitions. Its primary bourbon earned a gold medal at the 2010 San Francisco World Spirit Ratings Competition and a score of 90–95 from Wine Enthusiast in 2007. The Maker's Mark 46—which has longer aging and exposure to toasted French oak staves—has earned similar ratings.

Jane MacQuitty, spirits writer for The London Times, said of Maker's Mark that "What separates this bourbon from the rest is the softness and smoothness of its rich oak, vanilla and raisiny-like flavours." Food critic Morgan Murphy said "Dark as its red wax seal, this beautiful whiskey packs apple spice, vanilla, and a front-of-the-mouth crispness that is admired the world over."

== Limited edition collector's sets ==
=== Keeneland ===
Maker's Mark began special edition bottles featuring Keeneland bottles for horses in 1997. The label was white with a dark green horse and green wax. Other Keeneland bottles include famous Derby winners such as Secretariat (2003), Seattle Slew (2004), Affirmed (2005), American Pharoah (2016), and Justify (2018).

=== University of Louisville ===
On July 20, 2012, Maker's Mark started selling a limited edition bottle featuring University of Louisville's head football coach Charlie Strong.

=== University of Kentucky ===
Maker's Mark has featured several University of Kentucky sports personalities on its University of Kentucky (UK) line of limited release bottles. A limited quantity of bottles can be signed for free by the personality that was selected for the bottle and by a member of the Samuels family. The signing party is held at Keeneland horse track in the university's home city of Lexington.

The first UK special edition bottle was produced in 1993. In celebration of the 1996 NCAA Men's Basketball Champions, Maker's Mark printed a bottle that had a denim background with white type. The team's coach at the time, Rick Pitino, signed the bottle.

Other bottles include: Wildcat Bottle (2001), Bill Keightley (2002), Rupp's Runts (2006), The Unforgettables (2007), Joe B. Hall (first in 2008 and again in 2016), Rich Brooks (2009), John Calipari (2010), Tim Couch (2012), Dan Issel (2013), Mark Stoops (2014), and Adolph Rupp (2015). The 2015 bottle was the first in a series honoring the five basketball coaches who won NCAA titles at UK; Pitino was honored in 2017 and Tubby Smith in 2018, with Calipari to be honored for a second time in 2019.

== See also ==
- List of historic whisky distilleries
- List of National Historic Landmarks in Kentucky
