= George T. Stagg =

Type of bourbon whiskey

George T. Stagg Bourbon whiskey
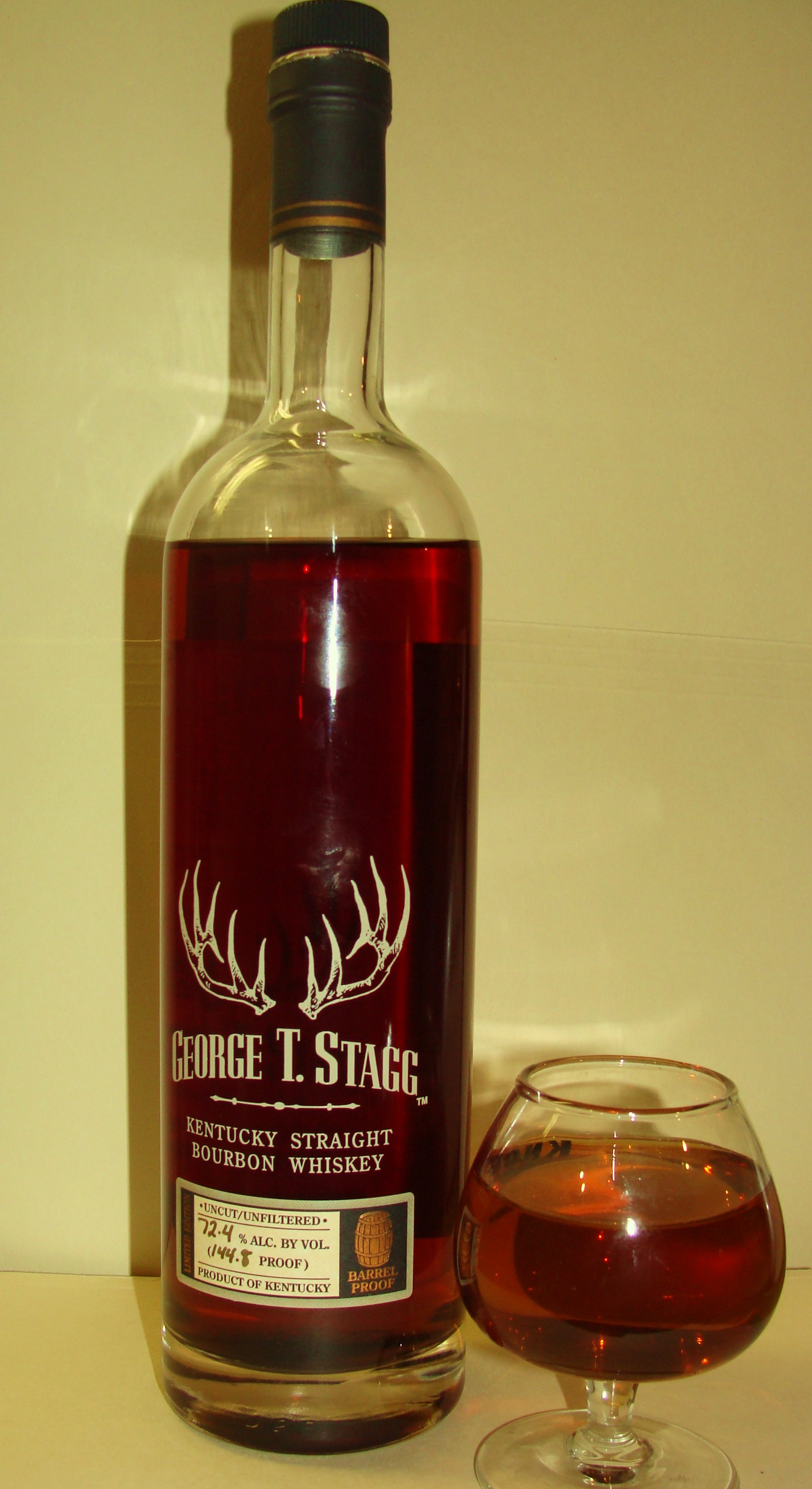
- Bottle of George T. Stagg
- Type: Bourbon whiskey
- Manufacturer: Sazerac Company
- Origin: Kentucky, United States
- Alcohol by volume: 70.70% (varies)
- Proof (US): 141.4 (varies)
- Related products: Buffalo Trace

George T. Stagg is a limited-production bourbon whiskey distributed by Buffalo Trace Distillery, as part of the distillery's "Antique Collection" series. It is a high proof uncut and unfiltered bourbon, aged for approximately 15 years. It has been distributed only once a year in the fall (a second spring release was added in 2005). It is mainly distributed within the U.S.A.

George T. Stagg had been the owner of the Buffalo Trace Distillery after Edmund H. Taylor Jr. starting in 1878.

== Reviews and awards ==
The whiskey has been highly awarded in various spirit ratings competitions and has won best rankings in some years in Jim Murray's "Whisky Bible". The San Francisco World Spirits Competition awarded three gold and three double gold medals to the bourbon between 2006 and 2012.

George T. Stagg was awarded the Chairman's Trophy among Kentucky Straight Bourbons at the 2014 New York "Ultimate Spirits Challenge", and in 2013 it won the Best North American Whiskey award at the World Whiskies Awards.

In December 2015, the 2015 release of George T. Stagg was named "#3 of Top 65 Five-Star Spirits of 2015" and awarded "5 Stars - Highest Recommendation" by F. Paul Pacult's Spirit Journal. The 2015 release of Stagg also won a Gold Medal in the "Best Non-Age Statement Bourbon" category of the 2016 World Whiskies Awards, sponsored by Whisky Magazine.

Food critic Morgan Murphy once wrote "If you want your guests' eyes to pop out of their heads in a fit of bourbon ecstasy, this is your bourbon."

== Releases ==
Year/Information	Year of Distillation	Product Age	Proof	% ABV	Number of Barrels	Warehouses	Warehouse Floors	Evaporation Loss	Number of Bottles (est.)
2002	N/A	15 years	137.6	68.8	N/A	N/A	N/A	N/A	N/A
2003	N/A	15 years	142.7	71.35	N/A	N/A	N/A	N/A	N/A
2004	Spring 1988	16 years	129	64.5	40	Q	N/A	53.18%	5,009
Spring 2005 Lot A: Kentucky	Spring 1988	16 years, 8 months	130.9	65.45	80 (combined Spring release)	Q	2, 4	54.98%	9,633 (combined Spring release)
Spring 2005 Lot B: Non-Kentucky release	Spring 1988	16 years, 8 months	131.8	65.9	80 (combined Spring release)	Q	2, 4	54.98%	9,633 (combined Spring release)
Fall 2005	Spring 1990	15 years, 4 months	141.2	70.6	95	I	2, 4, 8	58.59%	10,522
2006	Spring 1990	16 years, 3 months	140.6	70.3	89	I	8	57.57%	10,100
2007	Spring 1992	15 years, 6 month	144.8	72.4	94	I	1	45.23%	13,770
2008	Spring 1993	15 years, 6 months	141.8	70.9	83	I, K	1, 3, 5	50.07%	11,084
2009	Winter 1992	16 years, 7 months	141.4	70.7	109	K	1, 3	49.81%	14,632
2010	Winter 1993	17 years, 7 months	143.0	71.5	142	H, I, K, L	1, 2, 3, 4, 5, 8, 9	48.43%	19,586
2011	Winter 1993	18 years, 5 months	142.6	71.3	124	H, I, K	1, 2, 3, 4, 5, 8	57.83%	13,986
2012	Spring 1995	16 years, 9 months	142.8	71.4	118	L, H, I, K	1, 2, 3, 4, 5, 6, 8	53.69%	14,616
2013	Spring 1997	15 years, 11 months	128.2	64.1	157	I, K, Q	1, 2, 4, 8	73.34%	11,195
2014	Spring 1998	16 years, 4 months	138.1	69.05	161	C, H, I, K, L, P, Q	1, 2, 3, 4, 6, 7	74.81%	10,847
2015	Spring 2000	15 years, 1 month	138.2	69.1	128	C, H, I, L, M, H, Q, K	1, 2, 3, 4, 5, 7	84.46%	5,320
2016	Spring 2001	15 years, 4 months	144.1	72.05	142	M, N, H, L, K	1, 2, 3	75.99%	9,119
2017	Spring 2002	15 years, 3 months	129.2	64.6	309	C, K, M, Q	1, 2, 3, 6	54.03%	37,993
2018	Spring 2003	15 years, 4 months	124.9	62.45	284	C, H, I, K, P, Q	1, 2, 3, 4, 5	51.15%	37,107
2019	Spring 2004	15 years, 3 months	116.9	58.45	N/A	C, H, K, Q, I	1, 2, 3, 4	56.0%	N/A
2020	Spring 2005	15 years, 4 months	130.4	65.2	N/A	L, K, Q	1, 2, 9	59.0%	N/A
2022	Spring 2007	15 years, 5 months	138.7	69.35	N/A	K	1, 3	75.0%	N/A
2023	Spring 2008	15 years, 3 months	135	67.5	N/A	C, I, K, L, M	1, 2, 3, 4, 5	68.0%	N/A
2024	Fall 2008 Through Spring 2009	15 years, 2 months	136.1	68.05	N/A	C, L, M, P	1, 2, 3, 4, 5	61.0%	N/A
