= Old Rip Van Winkle =

Kentucky Straight Bourbon whiskey

Old Rip Van Winkle Bourbon
- Type: Bourbon whiskey
- Manufacturer: The Sazerac Company
- Origin: Frankfort, Kentucky, United States
- Alcohol by volume: 53.50%
- Proof (US): 107.0
- Related products: Buffalo Trace

Old Rip Van Winkle Bourbon Whiskey is a Kentucky Straight Bourbon whiskey produced by the Sazerac Company at its Buffalo Trace Distillery in Frankfort, Kentucky. The name is derived from Washington Irving's 1819 short story Rip Van Winkle. It is sold in 750ml glass bottles. The primary brand expression is aged 10 years.

It is sometimes confused with its sister brand, Pappy Van Winkle's Family Reserve, and misleadingly so, as "Pappy" is often more expensive. Nevertheless, in January 2026, a bottle of Old Rip Van Winkle 20 year old single barrel "Sam's" bourbon sold at a Sotheby's auction for $162,500 which is cited as the highest price publicly recorded for a bottle of American Whiskey.

The arrangement for production of Old Rip Van Winkle at the Buffalo Trace Distillery resulted from a joint venture arrangement with the Van Winkle family that was established in June 2002.

== See also ==
- Rip Van Winkle
