= Pappy Van Winkle's Family Reserve =

Brand of bourbon whiskey

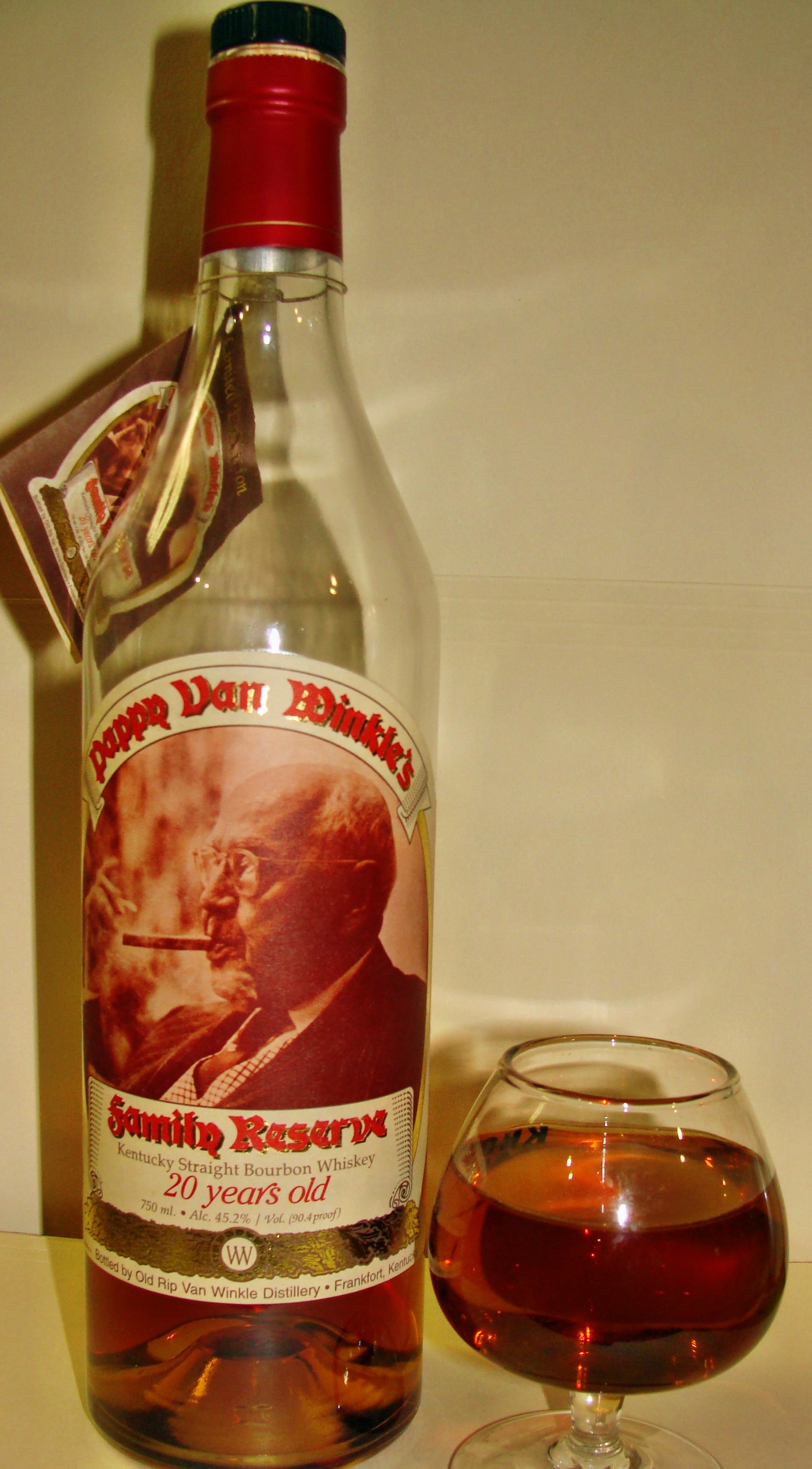
- Type: Bourbon whiskey
- Manufacturer: Sazerac Company
- Origin: Kentucky, United States
- Alcohol by volume: 45.2–53.5%
- Related products: Buffalo Trace; Old Rip Van Winkle

Pappy Van Winkle's Family Reserve is the flagship brand of bourbon whiskey owned by the "Old Rip Van Winkle Distillery" company. It is distilled and bottled by the Sazerac Company at its Buffalo Trace Distillery in Frankfort, Kentucky. Pappy Van Winkle's Family Reserve is often regarded as one of the finest bourbons in the world, and its very low production and high demand can make it extremely difficult to find.

== History ==
In 1893, when he was 18 years old, Julian "Pappy" Van Winkle Sr. began working as a salesman for W.L. Weller & Sons. He became co-owner fifteen years later. In 1910 they acquired the A. Ph. Stitzel Distillery in Louisville, Kentucky, which had started as a sour mash whiskey distillery in 1872.

The Stitzel Distillery supplied much of the whiskey sold by the Weller wholesale firm. Old Rip Van Winkle was introduced just before the start of Prohibition in the United States. After Prohibition, the brand was not reintroduced until after 1972 when the Stitzel-Weller distillery and its current brand names (including W. L. Weller, Old Fitzgerald, Rebel Yell, and Cabin Still) were sold to other companies. The only brand name the Van Winkle family had kept the rights to was the pre-Prohibition brand Old Rip Van Winkle. A photo of Pappy Van Winkle lighting a cigar graces the bottle's label.

Sometime after the Stitzel-Weller distillery was sold in 1972, Julian Van Winkle Jr. reintroduced the Old Rip Van Winkle brand and initially used old whiskey stocks from the distillery for its bottlings. Julian Jr. died in 1981 and Julian Van Winkle III (Pappy's grandson) took over the Old Rip Van Winkle Distillery company.

After the initial sale in 1972, the Stitzel-Weller distillery was eventually closed completely in 1991.

Since 2002, the Van Winkle brands have been distilled and bottled by the Sazerac Company at the Buffalo Trace Distillery as a joint venture with the Old Rip Van Winkle Distillery company.

In 2013, Julian Preston Van Winkle III said the 2013 bottlings of the 23-year brand expression "may be the last of its kind", since at that point there was very little left of the aging stock from the Stitzel-Weller distillery (although he said the brand would not be discontinued). The makers say that they do not want to boost production, as there is considerable long-term risk, and they do not want to be left holding copious quantities of unsaleable bourbon should tastes, fashions or circumstances change.

Production is being increased somewhat, with a projected increase of the annual production from six to eight thousand bottles in 2015, to 15 thousand by 2025, but the production will remain well below mass-market levels.

== Popularity ==
The product has a cult-like following. Famous chefs such as Anthony Bourdain and David Chang have favored the product. Food Republic reported that Chef John Currence said: "There's Pappy Van Winkle, then there's everything else." Bourbon aficionados have shown up in droves to get a small chance in a lottery to purchase some (at the full list price of more than $100 per bottle). It has been called "the bourbon everyone wants but no one can get". A writer for The Wall Street Journal said "you could call it bourbon, or you could call it a $5,000 bottle of liquified, barrel-aged unobtanium." Jen Doll wrote in The Wire, "it's an age-old dilemma (supply and demand) leading to an age-old marketing dream (a product that can't be kept on the shelves ... money in the pockets ... bourbon in the bourbon snifters)."

According to an article published by Fox News and Maxim, 23-year-old Pappy Van Winkle's Family Reserve is said to be one of the five most expensive bourbons.

On April 10, 2018, Kentucky priest Father Jim Sichko personally delivered a bottle of 23 year old Pappy Van Winkle to Pope Francis. Sichko, who lives in Madison County, tweeted about the event, posting a photo of him handing over the pricey bourbon on April 10 with the caption, “Pope Francis receiving his 23 year old Pappy Van Winkle Bourbon as we shared our love of My Ole Kentucky Home!” He also posted a selfie taken with the Pope outside after mass on Sunday. The pope said "very good bourbon."

In the Paramount TV series "Landman" (season 2, episode 4), there is a scene where the character "Cami Miller" played by Demi Moore pours a bottle of 23 year old Pappy Van Winkle onto the grave of her husband's character "Monty Miller", who is played by Jon Hamm. It is also referenced throughout the first season of “Cross” as the favorite drink of Detective Alex Cross (played by Aldis Hodge).

== Style ==
Like all modern bourbons, Van Winkle bourbons are made primarily from corn and aged in charred new American oak barrels. A distinguishing feature of Van Winkle bourbons is their use of wheat as the secondary ingredient instead of the usual rye, and their additional inclusion of barley malt.

Pappy Van Winkle is aged for 15, 20 or 23 years, all of which are considerably longer than the aging period for most bourbons. The 20 year is bottled at 90.4 U.S. proof (45.2% alcohol by volume) and has been described as "intensely fruity". The 15 year is bottled at 107 proof. The 23 year is bottled at 95.6 proof.

== Related products ==
Pappy Van Winkle's Family Reserve is not to be confused with its similarly named sister brands, which are substantially less expensive and less sought after. The related brands include:

- Old Rip Van Winkle straight bourbon, aged 10 years, produced with a similar mash bill but much lower priced and aged for a shorter period
- Van Winkle Special Reserve "Lot B" straight bourbon, aged 12 years
- Van Winkle Family Reserve straight rye whiskey, aged 13 years

Some restaurant and bar menus fail to clearly distinguish the brand names, and may even list these other brands as "Pappy". Three telltale signs are that the other affiliated brands are aged less, so any product that is not aged at least 15 years is not true Pappy, only the true Pappy brands have the photo on the label showing Julian "Pappy" Van Winkle Sr., and only the true Pappy bourbons say "Pappy Van Winkle's Family Reserve" on the label.

The rye label includes a small subtext saying "From Pappy Van Winkle's Private Stock", but its main title does not use "Pappy", and the "Old Rip" and "Special Reserve" labels do not say "Pappy" at all.

Another product produced at the same distillery, with the same or almost the same mash bill, is Sazerac's W. L. Weller brand.

== Awards ==
Pappy Van Winkle's Family Reserve has won various awards.

- The 20-year-old expression won a Double Gold Medal at the 2014 San Francisco World Spirits Competition.
- The 23-year-old expression was named "Spirit of the Year" for 2010 by Wine & Spirits magazine in its annual buying guide issue.
- The 20-year-old expression was recognized with the "Trophy for Worldwide Whisky" and a Best-In-Class Gold Medallion in the 2008 International Wine and Spirit Competition. It received a score of 99 ("superlative") from the Beverage Testing Institute in the same year.
- A 99 rating from the Beverage Testing Institute for the 20-year-old Pappy Van Winkle in 1996 was the highest rating it had ever given, and was instrumental in making the whiskey especially coveted.

== 2013 theft ==
In mid-October 2013 the company reported the theft of 65 three-bottle cases of Pappy Van Winkle 20 Year and nine three-bottle cases of 13-year-old Van Winkle Family Reserve rye. Police theorized that it took the thief about two months to complete the heist, and noted that whoever did it avoided being recorded by security cameras.

On Monday December 2, Pat Melton, the sheriff of Franklin County, Kentucky, announced a $10,000 reward to anyone who could give information that leads to a conviction in the case. $1,000 of this reward money was offered by Bluegrass Crimestoppers and the other $9,000 by an anonymous donor.

A break in the case came in March 2014 when a Buffalo Trace employee was arrested by Franklin County deputies when five barrels of stolen Wild Turkey bourbon were found on his property. On April 21, 2015, nine Kentucky residents, three of whom were employees at both Wild Turkey and Buffalo Trace, were indicted for thefts at the Buffalo Trace and Wild Turkey distilleries dating back to 2008. Over $100,000 worth of the stolen whiskey was recovered, including more than two dozen bottles of Pappy Van Winkle and 15 barrels of Wild Turkey. The Van Winkle family has stated that the stolen whiskey should be destroyed as a precaution against tampering or contamination, pending the approval of the judge. The recovered whiskey had been destroyed.

The heists included Pappy Van Winkle (more than 20 cases), 50 to 70 cases of Eagle Rare bourbon, and stolen barrels of other whiskey that are still missing. The warrants recovered one barrel of 17-year-old Eagle Rare worth more than $11,000. All nine defendants were charged with being members of a criminal syndicate, engaging in organized crime. The alleged ringleader, Gilbert "Toby" Curtsinger, was originally sentenced to 15 years of prison, but that sentence was later reduced to 30 days, with probation, as a result of overcrowding in the Kentucky penal system.

In 2021, Netflix released a docuseries called Heist about the incident.

== Forgeries and counterfeits ==
Counterfeiters have used empty bottles of Pappy Van Winkle's Family Reserve to refill with other bourbon and sell as authentic. Counterfeiters will generally purchase empty Van Winkle bottles online on sites such as eBay and refill with similar tasting bourbon.

As the Van Winkle line has grown in popularity and the values have risen, many recipes have been published online to try and mimic the taste of Van Winkle bourbon by blending other less valuable bourbons together. These bourbon mixes are commonly referred to as “Poor Man’s Pappy”.

== See also ==
- Old Fitzgerald
- Old Rip Van Winkle
