= W. L. Weller =

Brand of bourbon whiskey

W. L. Weller Bourbon whiskey
- Type: Bourbon whiskey
- Manufacturer: Sazerac Company
- Origin: Kentucky, United States
- Introduced: 1849
- Alcohol by volume: 45%–57%
- Proof (US): 90–114
- Variants: W. L. Weller Special Reserve; W. L. Weller Antique
- Related products: Buffalo Trace; Pappy Van Winkle's Family Reserve; Old Rip Van Winkle

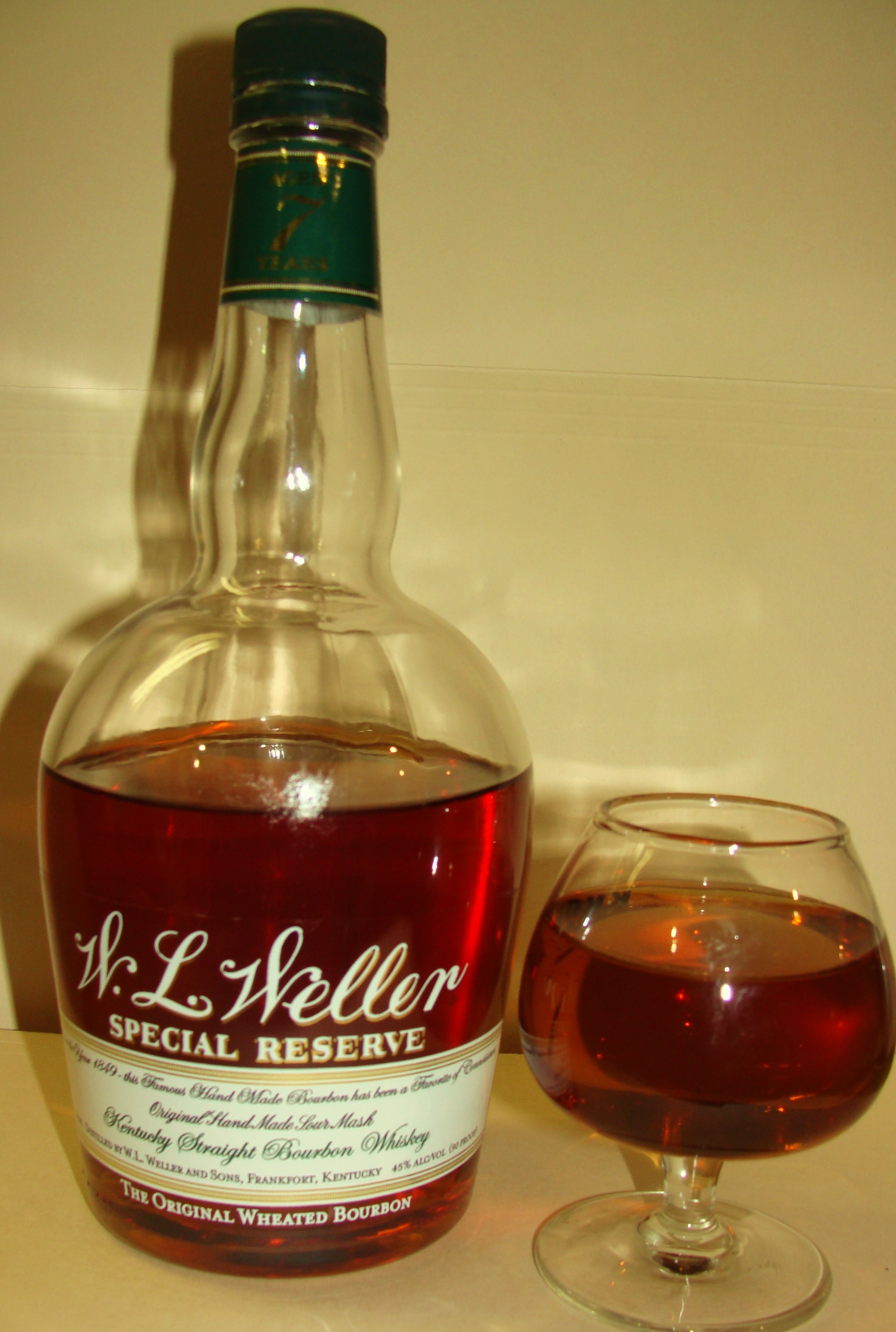
A bottle and a glass of W. L. Weller

W. L. Weller is a brand of "wheated" bourbon whiskey. The brand was created by the Stitzel-Weller Distilling Company, and was sold several times after 1972. Since 1999, the brand has been owned by the Sazerac Company. It is produced at the Buffalo Trace Distillery in Frankfort, Kentucky. Like all bourbons, Weller is distilled from a mash composed of at least 51% corn (maize). The secondary grain used for the Weller brand is wheat, whereas most bourbons use rye.

== Name ==
The bourbon was named after William Larue Weller (1825–1899), who was a distiller in the early days of Kentucky. He was supposedly the first to produce straight bourbon using wheat instead of rye in the mashbill. His wheated bourbon was first produced in 1849.

== Brand expressions ==
=== Current ===
There are several bourbons produced under the W. L. Weller name:

- Weller Special Reserve – "green label", bottled at 90 proof
- Weller Antique 107 – "red label", bottled at 107 proof
- Weller Single Barrel – "orange label", bottled at 97 proof
- Weller Full Proof – "blue label", bottled at 114 proof, and non-chill filtered
- Weller 12 Year – "black label", bottled at 90 proof
- Weller C.Y.P.B. – "white label", bottled at 95 proof
- William Larue Weller – Antique Collection, unfiltered and bottled at barrel proof

=== Past ===
- W. L. Weller 19 year was bottled at 90 proof. It was released only for the 2000, 2001, and 2002 Antique Collections.
- W. L. Weller Centennial was aged for 10 years and bottled at 100 proof. It went out of production in 2009.

== William Larue Weller bourbon ==
Introduced in 2005 as part of the Buffalo Trace Antique Collection, William Larue Weller Kentucky Straight Bourbon Whiskey is an uncut, unfiltered bourbon that's bottled at barrel proof. The proof and age of this annual release varies from year to year:

William Larue Weller (WLW)
Release	Year of distillation	Product age	Release proof	Number of barrels	Warehouses	Warehouse floors	Evaporation loss	Number of bottles (est.)
Fall of 2005	Fall of 1993	12 years, 2 months	121.9	41	Q	5th	58.04%	4,602
Fall of 2006	Spring of 1991	15 years, 3 months	129.9	22	M	5th	50.64%	2,905
Fall of 2007	Spring of 1997	10 years, 3 months	117.9	34	I	9th	53.27%	4,250
Fall of 2008	Spring of 1997	11 years, 2 months	125.3	40	I	9th	52.05%	5,131
Fall of 2009	Fall of 1998	11 years	134.8	41	N, O	5th	57.20%	4,694
Fall of 2010	Summer of 1998	12 years, 3 months	126.6	55	I, P	4th and 9th	55.50%	6,547
Fall of 2011	Fall of 1998	12 years, 11 months	133.5	45	N, O, P	4th and 5th	57.20%	5,152
Fall of 2012	Spring of 2000	12 years, 4 months	123.4	49	P, I	2nd and 4th	56.60%	5,689
Fall of 2013	Spring of 2001	12 years, 1 month	136.2	39	M, P	3rd and 4th	55.30%	3,468
Fall of 2014	Spring of 2002	12 years, 3 months	140.2	39	D, K, L	2nd, 3rd, 4th, and 6th	62.30%	3,933
Fall of 2015	Spring of 2003	12 years, 3 months	134.6	105	I, K, L	2nd and 6th	72.30%	7,780
Fall of 2016	Winter of 2003	12 years, 7 months	135.4	145	D, K, L	3rd and 6th	65.40%	13,421
Fall of 2017	Winter of 2005	12 years, 6 months	128.2	155	D, I, P	1st thru 6th	54.08%	19,040
Fall of 2018	Winter of 2006	12 years, 6 months	125.7	149	C, I, K, L, M, Q	2nd thru 5th	56.90%	17,179
Fall of 2019	Winter of 2007	12 years, 6 months	128.0	N/A	I	2nd and 3rd	57.00%	N/A
Fall of 2020	Winter of 2008	12 years, 6 months	134.5	N/A	I, C	3rd, 5th, and 6th	73.0%	N/A
Fall of 2021	Winter of 2009	12 years, 6 months	125.3	N/A	K, L, D, Q, C	1st, 2nd, 3rd	64.0%	N/A
Fall of 2022	Spring of 2010	12 years, 8 months	124.7	N/A	C, K, N	2nd, 3rd, 4th	64.0%	N/A
Fall of 2023	Spring of 2011	12 years, 6 months	133.6	N/A	C, L, M, N	2nd and 3rd	66.0%	N/A

== Awards ==
The 2016 release of William Larue Weller, from the Buffalo Trace Antique Collection, was awarded a 2017 Double Gold medal by the San Francisco World Spirits Competition.

Old Weller Antique 107 was awarded a gold medal at the 2016 New York World Wine & Spirits Competition.

W. L. Weller 12 Year Old Bourbon won the designation of "Extraordinary / Ultimate Recommendation (95–100 pts)" from the 2015 Ultimate Spirits Challenge and a Silver Outstanding medal from the 2015 International Wine & Spirits Competition (UK).

Spirits writer Jim Murray named William Larue Weller Bourbon the "Second Finest Whisky in the World" in his Jim Murray's Whisky Bible 2015 (ISBN 978-0955472992). The 2015 release of William Larue Weller was awarded a Silver Outstanding medal from the 2016 International Wine & Spirits Competition (UK).

Weller Full Proof was awarded a Double Gold in the Straight Bourbon category at the 2023 New York World Spirits Competition. WL Weller Single Barrel and WL Weller Full Proof both won Masters awards at the 2023 American Whiskey Masters.
