= Cabin Still =

American Bourbon whiskey brand

Cabin Still Bourbon
- Type: Bourbon whiskey
- Manufacturer: Heaven Hill
- Origin: Kentucky, United States
- Alcohol by volume: 40.0%
- Proof (US): 80
- Related products: Heaven Hill

Cabin Still Bourbon is a Bourbon whiskey distilled in Louisville, Kentucky, and bottled in Bardstown, Kentucky, by the Heaven Hill company. It is sold in glass in 16 oz pint bottles, glass 750 ml bottles, glass 1-liter bottles, and plastic 1.75 liter bottles.
