= Old Fitzgerald =

Brand of wheated bourbon

- Very Special Old Fitzgerald, a 12 year-old super-premium bourbon
- Type: Bourbon whiskey
- Manufacturer: Heaven Hill Distilleries, Inc.
- Origin: Kentucky, United States
- Introduced: 1870
- Alcohol by volume: 45%
- Proof (US): 90
- Related products: Barton Brands

Old Fitzgerald is a brand of wheated bourbon distilled in Louisville, Kentucky, by Heaven Hill Distilleries, Inc.

== History ==
Old Fitzgerald was first produced in 1870 for rail and steamship lines and private clubs by Solomon Charles Herbst, a Milwaukee-based liquor retailer and rectifier. Around 1900, "Old Fitz" was released to the public in America and Europe. It was one of the few distilled using the pot still method, and continued to do so until around 1913. During the Prohibition in the United States, Old Fitzgerald was one of a select few to distill under government supervision for the national medicinal trade, it was soon after acquired by Pappy Van Winkle for $10,000 which then introduced the "Whisper of Wheat" to the original recipe. By substituting some wheat for the more traditional rye in the grain recipe, Old Fitzgerald presented a rounder, softer profile than other bourbons.

Old Fitzgerald was produced at the Stitzel-Weller Distillery until the distillery was shut down in 1992 and production transferred to Diageo's newly constructed Bernheim Distillery in Louisville. In 1999, Diageo sold the brand, along with the Bernheim Distillery, to Heaven Hill, which currently produces and markets Old Fitzgerald.

== Old Fitzgerald products ==
=== Current ===
- Larceny Small Batch
- Larceny Barrel Proof
- Old Fitzgerald Bottled-in-Bond

=== Previous ===
- Old Fitzgerald Prime
- Old Fitzgerald's 1849
- Very Special Old Fitzgerald 12 Years Old
- Very Old Fitzgerald (8 year)
- Very Xtra Old Fitzgerald (10 year)
- Very Very Old Fitzgerald (12 year)
- Very Very Old Fitzgerald (15 year)
- Very Very Old Fitzgerald (18 year)
