= List of whisky distilleries in Scotland =

A map of all distilleries operating in 2018

Scotch whisky is distilled from water, cereals and yeast. It must be matured for three years or more before bottling, and bottled at 40% or more alcohol by volume. There are five single malt producing regions, namely Campbeltown, Highland, Islay, Lowland and Speyside.

== Currently operating distilleries ==
As of June 2026, there are 154 whisky distilleries operating in Scotland.

=== Malt whisky distilleries ===
Distillery	Location	Region	Founded	Owner
Aberargie	Aberargie	Lowland	2017	Morrison Scotch Whisky Distillers
Aberfeldy	Aberfeldy	Highland	1896	John Dewar & Sons
Aberlour	Aberlour	Speyside	1879	Chivas Brothers
Abhainn Dearg	Uig, Isle of Lewis	Island	2008	Mark Tayburn
Ailsa Bay	Girvan	Lowland	2009	William Grant & Sons
Allt-A-Bhainne	Glenrinnes	Speyside	1975	Chivas Brothers
Annandale	Annan	Lowland	1836	Annandale Distillery Company
Arbikie	Inverkeilor	Highland	2013	Arbikie Highland Estate
Ardbeg	Port Ellen	Islay	1815	LVMH
Ardgowan	Inverkip	Lowland	1896	Ardgowan Distillery Company
Ardmore	Kennethmont	Highland	1898	Suntory Global Spirits
Ardnahoe	Port Askaig	Islay	2019	Hunter Laing & Company
Ardnamurchan	Ardnamurchan	Highland	2014	Adelphi Distillery Co
Ardross	Alness	Highland	2019	Greenwood Distillers
Auchentoshan	Dalmuir	Lowland	1823	Suntory Global Spirits
Auchroisk	Mulben	Speyside	1972	Diageo
Aultmore	Banffshire	Speyside	1895	John Dewar & Sons
Balblair	Edderton	Highland	1790	Inver House Distillers
Ballindalloch	Ballindalloch	Speyside	2014	Ballindalloch Distillery LLP
Balmaud	Turriff	Highland	2024	Balmaud Distillery Co. Ltd.
Balmenach	Cromdale	Speyside	1824	Inver House Distillers
Balvenie	Dufftown	Speyside	1892	William Grant & Sons
Ben Cumhaill (/bɛnˈkuːl/)	Dumfries	Lowland	2025	Simpson family
Ben Nevis	Fort William	Highland	1825	Nikka Whisky Distilling Co Ltd
Benbecula	Outer Hebrides	Island	2024	Angus A. MacMillan
BenRiach	Longmorn, Moray	Speyside	1898	Brown-Forman
Benrinnes	Banffshire	Speyside	1826	Diageo
Benromach	Forres	Speyside	1898	Gordon & MacPhail
Blackness	Linlithgow	Lowland	2024	Colm O'Rourke
Bladnoch	Wigtown	Lowland	1817	David Prior
Blair Athol	Pitlochry	Highland	1798	Diageo
Bonnington	Edinburgh	Lowland	2020	Halewood Artisanal Spirits
Borders	Hawick	Lowland	2018	The Three Stills Company
Bowmore	Bowmore	Islay	1779	Suntory Global Spirits
Braeval	Ballindalloch	Speyside	1973	Chivas Brothers
Brora	Brora	Highland	1819	Diageo
Bruichladdich	Rhinns of Islay	Islay	1881	Rémy Cointreau
Bunnahabhain	Port Askaig	Islay	1881	Distell
Burn O'Bennie	Banchory	Highland	2021	Deeside Brewery & Distillery Ltd.
Cabrach	Cabrach	Speyside	2024	The Cabrach Trust
Cairn	Grantown-on-Spey	Speyside	2022	Gordon & MacPhail
Caol Ila	Port Askaig	Islay	1846	Diageo
Cardhu	Knockando	Speyside	1824	Diageo
Clydeside	Glasgow	Lowland	2017	Morrison Glasgow Distillers
Clynelish	Brora	Highland	1967	Diageo
Cragganmore	Ballindalloch	Speyside	1869	Diageo
Craigellachie	Craigellachie	Speyside	1891	John Dewar & Sons
Daftmill	Fife	Lowland	2005	Francis and Ian Cuthbert
Dailuaine	Aberlour	Speyside	1852	Diageo
Dalmore	Alness	Highland	1839	Whyte & Mackay
Dalmunach	Carron	Speyside	2015	Chivas Brothers
Dalwhinnie	Dalwhinnie	Highland	1898	Diageo
Deanston	Doune	Highland	1965	Distell
Deerness	Deerness	Island	2016	Deerness Distillery Ltd
Dornoch	Dornoch	Highland	2017	Dornoch Distillery Company
Dufftown	Banffshire	Speyside	1895	Diageo
Dunphail	Edinkillie, Moray	Speyside	2023	Bimber
Eden Mill	Fife	Lowland	2012	Paul Miller
Edradour	Pitlochry	Highland	1825	Signatory Vintage Scotch Whisky Co
Falkirk	Falkirk	Lowland	2020	Fiona Stewart
Fettercairn	Fettercairn	Highland	1824	Whyte & Mackay
Galloway	Galloway	Lowland	2017	Sam Heughan
Glasgow	Glasgow	Lowland	2015	The Glasgow Distillery Company
Glenallachie	Banffshire	Speyside	1967	The GlenAllachie Distillers Co Limited
Glenburgie	Moray	Speyside	1810	Chivas Brothers
Glencadam	Angus	Highland	1825	Angus Dundee Distiller
Glendronach	Aberdeenshire	Highland	1826	Brown-Forman
Glendullan	Banffshire	Speyside	1897	Diageo
Glen Elgin	Fogwatt, Moray	Speyside	1898	Diageo
Glenfarclas	Ballindalloch	Speyside	1836	J. & G. Grant
Glenfiddich	Dufftown	Speyside	1886	William Grant & Sons
Glen Garioch	Oldmeldrum	Highland	1797	Suntory Global Spirits
Glenglassaugh	Portsoy	Highland	1875	Brown-Forman
Glengoyne	Dumgoyne	Highland	1833	Ian Macleod Distillers
Glen Grant	Rothes	Speyside	1840	Campari
Glengyle	Campbeltown	Campbeltown	1872	Mitchell's Glengyle Ltd
Glen Keith	Keith	Speyside	1957	Chivas Brothers
Glenkinchie	Pencaitland	Lowland	1837	Diageo
Glenlivet	Ballindalloch	Speyside	1824	Chivas Brothers
Glenlossie	Elgin	Speyside	1876	Diageo
Glenmorangie	Tain	Highland	1843	LVMH
Glen Moray	Elgin	Speyside	1897	La Martiniquaise
Glen Ord	Muir of Ord	Highland	1838	Diageo
Glenrothes	Rothes	Speyside	1879	Edrington
Glen Scotia	Campbeltown	Campbeltown	1832	Loch Lomond Group
Glen Spey	Rothes	Speyside	1878	Diageo
Glentauchers	Mulben	Speyside	1897	Chivas Brothers
Glenturret	Crieff	Highland	1763	Lalique Group
GlenWyvis	Dingwall	Highland	2015	GlenWyvis Distillery Ltd.
Harris	Tarbert	Island	2015	Isle of Harris Distillers Ltd.
Highland Park	Kirkwall	Island	1798	Edrington
Holyrood	Edinburgh	Lowland	2019	David Robertson
Inchdairnie	Glenrothes	Lowland	2015	John Fergus & Co.
Inchgower	Buckie	Speyside	1871	Diageo
Jackton	Jackton	Lowland	2020	RAER Spirits
Jura	Craighouse, Jura	Island	1810	Whyte & Mackay
Kilchoman	Kilchoman	Islay	2005	Kilchoman Distillery Company
Kimbland	Sanday	Island	2017	Kimbland Distillery Ltd
Kingsbarns	Kingsbarns	Lowland	2014	The Kingsbarns Company of Distillers
Kininvie	Dufftown	Speyside	1990	William Grant & Sons
Knockando	Knockando	Speyside	1898	Diageo
Knockdhu	Knock	Speyside	1894	Inver House Distillers
Kythe	Blairgowrie	Lowland	2022	Kythe Distillery Co.
Lagg	Lagg	Island	2019	Isle of Arran Distillers Ltd.
Laggan Bay	Islay	Islay	2026	Ian Macleod Distillers
Lagavulin	Port Ellen	Islay	1816	Diageo
Laphroaig	Port Ellen	Islay	1815	Suntory Global Spirits
Lerwick	Lerwick	Island	2022	Lerwick Distillery Ltd
Leven	Leven	Lowland	2013	Diageo
Lindores Abbey	Newburgh	Lowland	2017	Lindores Distilling Co.
Linkwood	Elgin	Speyside	1821	Diageo
Lochlea	Ayrshire	Lowland	2018	Neil McGeoch
Lochranza	Lochranza	Island	1995	Isle of Arran Distillers Ltd.
Loch Lomond	Alexandria	Highland	1964	Loch Lomond Group
Longmorn	Elgin	Speyside	1893	Chivas Brothers
Macallan	Craigellachie	Speyside	1824	Edrington
Macduff	Banff	Highland	1960	John Dewar & Sons
Mannochmore	Elgin	Speyside	1971	Diageo
Miltonduff	Elgin	Speyside	1824	Chivas Brothers
Moffat	Moffat	Lowland	2023	Dark Sky Spirits
Mortlach	Dufftown	Speyside	1823	Diageo
Nc’nean	Lochlaline	Highland	2017	Drimnin Distillery Company
North Point	Thurso	Highland	2020	North Coast Distillers Ltd.
North Uist	Benbecula	Island	2024	North Uist Distillery Company
Oban	Oban	Highland	1794	Diageo
Orkney	Kirkwall	Island	2018	Orkney Distilling Ltd.
Port Ellen	Port Ellen	Islay	1825	Diageo
Port of Leith	Edinburgh	Lowland	2023	Muckle Brig
Pulteney	Wick	Highland	1826	Inver House Distillers
Raasay	Isle of Raasay	Island	2014	R&B Distillers
Rosebank	Falkirk	Lowland	1798	Ian Macleod Distillers
Roseisle	Roseisle	Speyside	2010	Diageo
Royal Brackla	Nairn	Highland	1812	John Dewar & Sons
Royal Lochnagar	Ballater	Highland	1845	Diageo
Saxa Vord	Unst	Island	2015	Shetland Distillery Company
Scapa	Kirkwall	Island	1885	Chivas Brothers
Speyburn	Rothes	Speyside	1897	Inver House Distillers
Springbank	Campbeltown	Campbeltown	1828	J&A Mitchell & Company
Stannergill	Caithness	Highland	2026	Dunnet Bay Distillers
Stirling	Stirling	Lowland	2015	June & Cameron McCann
Strathearn	Methven	Highland	2013	Douglas Laing & Co.
Strathisla	Keith	Speyside	1786	Chivas Brothers
Strathmill	Keith	Speyside	1891	Diageo
Talisker	Carbost, Isle of Skye	Island	1830	Diageo
Tamdhu	Knockando	Speyside	1897	Ian Macleod Distillers
Tamnavulin	Tomnavoulin	Speyside	1966	Whyte & Mackay
Teaninich	Alness	Highland	1817	Diageo
Tiree	Tiree	Island	2019	Tiree Whisky Company Ltd.
Tobermory	Tobermory, Isle of Mull	Island	1798	Distell
Tomatin	Tomatin	Highland	1897	Takara Shuzo Co
Tomintoul	Ballindalloch	Speyside	1964	Angus Dundee Distiller
Torabhaig	Teangue, Isle of Skye	Island	2017	Mossburn Distillers
Tormore	Grantown-on-Spey	Speyside	1958	Elixir Distillers
Toulvaddie	Fearn	Highland	2022	Heather & Bobby Nelson
Tullibardine	Blackford	Highland	1949	Picard Vins & Spiritueux
Uile-bheist (/ˈuːləveɪʃt/)	Inverness	Highland	2023	Victoria and John Erasmus
Wolfburn	Thurso	Highland	1822	Aurora Brewing
8 Doors	John O’Groats	Highland	2022	Kerry and Derek Campbell

Note: The Scotch Whisky Association considers the Island region as part of the Highlands region.

=== Grain whisky distilleries ===
Distillery	Location	Founded	Owner
Cameronbridge	Fife	1824	Diageo
Girvan	Girvan	1963	William Grant & Sons
Invergordon	Easter Ross	1959	Whyte & Mackay
Loch Lomond	Alexandria	1964	Loch Lomond Group
North British	Edinburgh	1885	Lothian Distillers Ltd.
Reivers	Tweedbank	2018	Mossburn Distillers Ltd.
Starlaw	Livingston	2010	La Martiniquaise
Strathclyde	Glasgow	1927	Chivas Brothers

== Closed distilleries ==
=== Former malt distilleries ===
Distillery	Location	Region	Year closed
Adelphi	Glasgow	Lowland	1907, demolished 1970
Albyn	Millknowe	Campbeltown	1920, demolished 1929
Ardlussa	Campbeltown	Campbeltown	1927, demolished
Argyll	Campbeltown	Campbeltown	1923, demolished
Auchinblae	Auchenblae	Highland	1929, demolished
Auchnagie	Tulliemet	Highland	1911, demolished
Auchtermuchty	Auchtermuchty	Lowland	1926, buildings have remained intact
Auchtertool	Auchtertool	Lowland	1927, demolished
Ballechin	Pitlochry	Highland	1927, demolished
Banff	Banff	Speyside	1983, demolished 1991
Bankier	Denny	Lowland	1928, demolished 1981
Benachie	Insch	Highland	1915, demolished
Benmore	Campbeltown	Campbeltown	1927, buildings have remained intact
Ben Morven	Halkirk	Highland	1914, demolished
Ben Wyvis	Dingwall	Highland	1977, demolished 1977
Bon Accord	Aberdeen	Highland	1913, demolished
BrewDog	Ellon	Highland	2026, continued to function as a brewery
Burnside	Campbeltown	Campbeltown	1919, demolished
Caledonian	Campbeltown	Campbeltown	1842, demolished
Campbeltown	Campbeltown	Campbeltown	1924, demolished
Caperdonich	Rothes	Speyside	2002, demolished 2010
Clydesdale	Wishaw	Lowland	1919, demolished 1988
Chain Pier	Edinburgh	Lowland	2019, only operated for a few months between 2018-19
Coleburn	Elgin	Speyside	1985, plans for the distillery to reopen in 2027
Convalmore	Dufftown	Speyside	1985, converted into a whisky warehouse facility
Dalaruan	Campbeltown	Campbeltown	1922, demolished
Dalintober	Campbeltown	Campbeltown	1925, demolished
Dallas Dhu	Forres	Speyside	1983, plans for the distillery to reopen in 2025
Dean	Edinburgh	Lowland	1922, demolished
Devanha	Aberdeen	Highland	1915, demolished
Drumcaldie	Fife	Lowland	1903, demolished 1988
Drumore	Campbeltown	Campbeltown	1847, demolished
Edinburgh	Edinburgh	Lowland	1925, demolished
Finnieston	Glasgow	Lowland	1827, demolished
Fortrose	Fortrose	Highland	1852, demolished
Glen Albyn	Inverness	Highland	1983, demolished 1988
Glenaden	Old Deer	Highland	1915, demolished
Glencawdor	Nairn	Highland	1927, demolished 1930
Glencoull	Angus	Highland	1927, demolished 1934
Glenesk	Montrose	Highland	1985, demolished 1996
Glen Flagler	Airdrie	Lowland	1985, demolished 1988, warehouse converted into Inver House headquarters
Glenfoyle	Gargunnock	Highland	1923, demolished
Glengilp	Ardrishaig	Highland	1937, demolished 1996
Gleniffer	Elderslie	Lowland	1894, demolished
Glenlochy	Fort William	Highland	1983, demolished 1991
Glenmavis	Bathgate	Lowland	1910, demolished
Glen Mhor	Inverness	Highland	1983, demolished 1986
Glen Nevis	Campbeltown	Campbeltown	1923, demolished
Glenramskill	Campbeltown	Campbeltown	1854, demolished
Glenside	Campbeltown	Campbeltown	1926, demolished
Glenskiach	Evanton	Highland	1926, demolished 1933
Glentarras	Langholm	Lowland	1914, demolished
Glenugie	Peterhead	Highland	1983, demolished 1985
Glenury	Stonehaven	Highland	1985, demolished 1993
Grandtully	Grandtully	Highland	1910, demolished
Grange	Burntisland	Lowland	1925, demolished 1990
Greenock	Greenock	Lowland	1915, demolished
Highland	Campbeltown	Campbeltown	1852, demolished
Hazelburn	Campbeltown	Campbeltown	1925, demolished 1926
Imperial	Carron	Speyside	1998, demolished 2013
Inverleven	Dumbarton	Lowland	1991, demolished 2017
Isla	Perth	Highland	1926, demolished
Kinclaith	Glasgow	Lowland	1976, demolished 1976
Kinloch	Campbeltown	Campbeltown	1926, demolished 1928
Kintyre	Campbeltown	Campbeltown	1920, demolished
Ladyburn	Girvan	Lowland	1975, demolished 1976
Langholm	Langholm	Lowland	1917, demolished 1926
Littlemill	Bowling	Lowland	1992, demolished 2004
Loch Katrine	Glasgow	Lowland	1920, demolished
Lochside	Montrose	Highland	1992, demolished 2004
Lochhead	Campbeltown	Campbeltown	1928, demolished
Lochruan	Campbeltown	Campbeltown	1925, demolished
Longrow	Campbeltown	Campbeltown	1896, demolished
Meadowburn	Campbeltown	Campbeltown	1882, demolished
Millburn	Inverness	Highland	1985, demolished 1988
Mossfield	Campbeltown	Campbeltown	1837, demolished
North Port	Brechin	Highland	1983, demolished 1994
Parkmore	Dufftown	Speyside	1988, converted into a whisky warehouse facility
Pittyvaich	Dufftown	Speyside	1993, demolished 2002
Port Charlotte	Port Charlotte	Islay	1929, converted into a whisky warehouse facility
Provanmill	Glasgow	Lowland	1922, demolished 1953
Saucel	Paisley	Lowland	1915, demolished
Speyside	Drumguish	Speyside	2025
Springside	Campbeltown	Campbeltown	1926, demolished
St. Magdalene	Linlithgow	Lowland	1983, buildings were converted into apartments
Strathdee	Aberdeen	Highland	1942, demolished
Stromness	Orkney	Highland	1928, demolished 1940
Stronarchie	Forgandenny	Highland	1928, demolished 1950
Tambovie	Milngavie	Lowland	1914, demolished 1921
Thistle	Campbeltown	Campbeltown	1837, demolished
Toberanrigh	Campbeltown	Campbeltown	1860, demolished
Towiemore	Botriphnie	Highland	1930, demolished
Union	Campbeltown	Campbeltown	1850, demolished
West Highland	Campbeltown	Campbeltown	1852, demolished

=== Former grain distilleries ===
Distillery	Location	Year closed
Caledonian	Haymarket	1988, demolished
Cambus	Tullibody	1993, converted into a whisky warehouse facility and cask filling operation
Carsebridge	Alloa	1983, demolished 1990
Dumbarton	West Dunbartonshire	2002, demolished 2017
Dundashill	Glasgow	1902, merged with Port Dundas distillery
Garnheath	Airdrie	1986, demolished 1986
Gartloch	Chryston	1920, demolished
Kirkliston	Kirkliston	1920, buildings have remained intact
North of Scotland	Cambus	1980, demolished 1993
Port Dundas	Glasgow	2010, demolished 2011

== See also ==
- Scotch whisky
- List of historic whisky distilleries
- List of whisky brands
- Outline of whisky

== Bibliography ==
- Barnard, Alfred (2008) [1887]. The Whisky Distilleries of the United Kingdom. Edinburgh: Birlinn. ISBN 978-1-84158-652-6.
- Townsend, Brian (2000). Scotch Missed: The Lost Distilleries of Scotland. Angel's Share. ISBN 978-1897784976.
