= Speyside single malt =

Single malt Scotch whiskies distilled in Strathspey

Whisky producing regions of Scotland

Speyside single malts are single malt Scotch whiskies, distilled in Strathspey, the area around the River Spey in Moray and Badenoch and Strathspey, in northeastern Scotland.

The two best-selling single malt whiskies in the world, The Glenlivet and Glenfiddich, come from Speyside. Strathspey has the greatest number of distilleries of any of the whisky-producing areas of Scotland. Dufftown alone has six working distilleries with an annual capacity of 40.4 million litres of spirit.

== Legal status ==
Speyside is a "protected region" for Scotch Whisky distilling under UK Government legislation. According to Visit Scotland, this region includes the area between the Highlands to the west, Aberdeenshire in the east and extending south to the Cairngorms National Park. Due to the way that the regions are specified, Speyside is wholly within the Highland region and thus whiskies produced in Speyside may legally be described as coming from either region.

== Distilleries ==
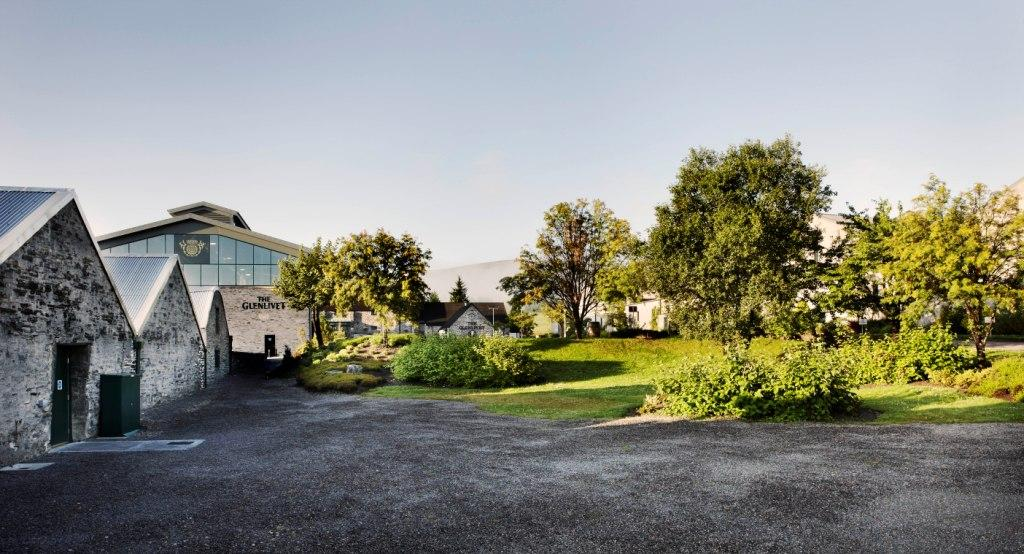
Glenlivet Distillery

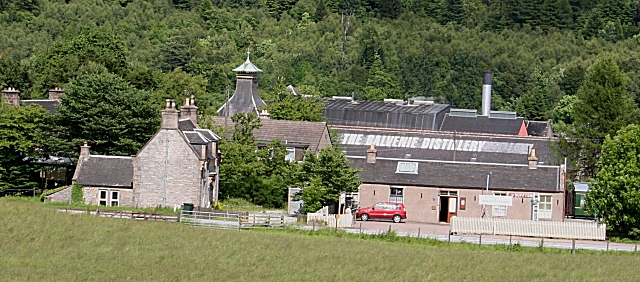
Balvenie Distillery (2007)

Illicit distilleries were common in the 1800s, but eventually, licences became available after the passing of the 1823 Excise Act. George Smith was the first licensee in Speyside, in 1824, and his small operation at Upper Drumin in the Glen Livet valley eventually grew into the massive Glenlivet enterprise.

Today, the major distilleries in the region are owned by leading international drinks groups including Diageo, LVMH and Pernod Ricard, by family-owned companies including J. & G. Grant and William Grant & Sons and by The Edrington Group (majority-owned by a charitable trust).

Roughly 50 per cent of Scotland's whisky is made here in the approximately 50 distilleries located in this region. According to one source, the top five are The Macallan, Glenfiddich, Aberlour, Glenfarclas and Balvenie.

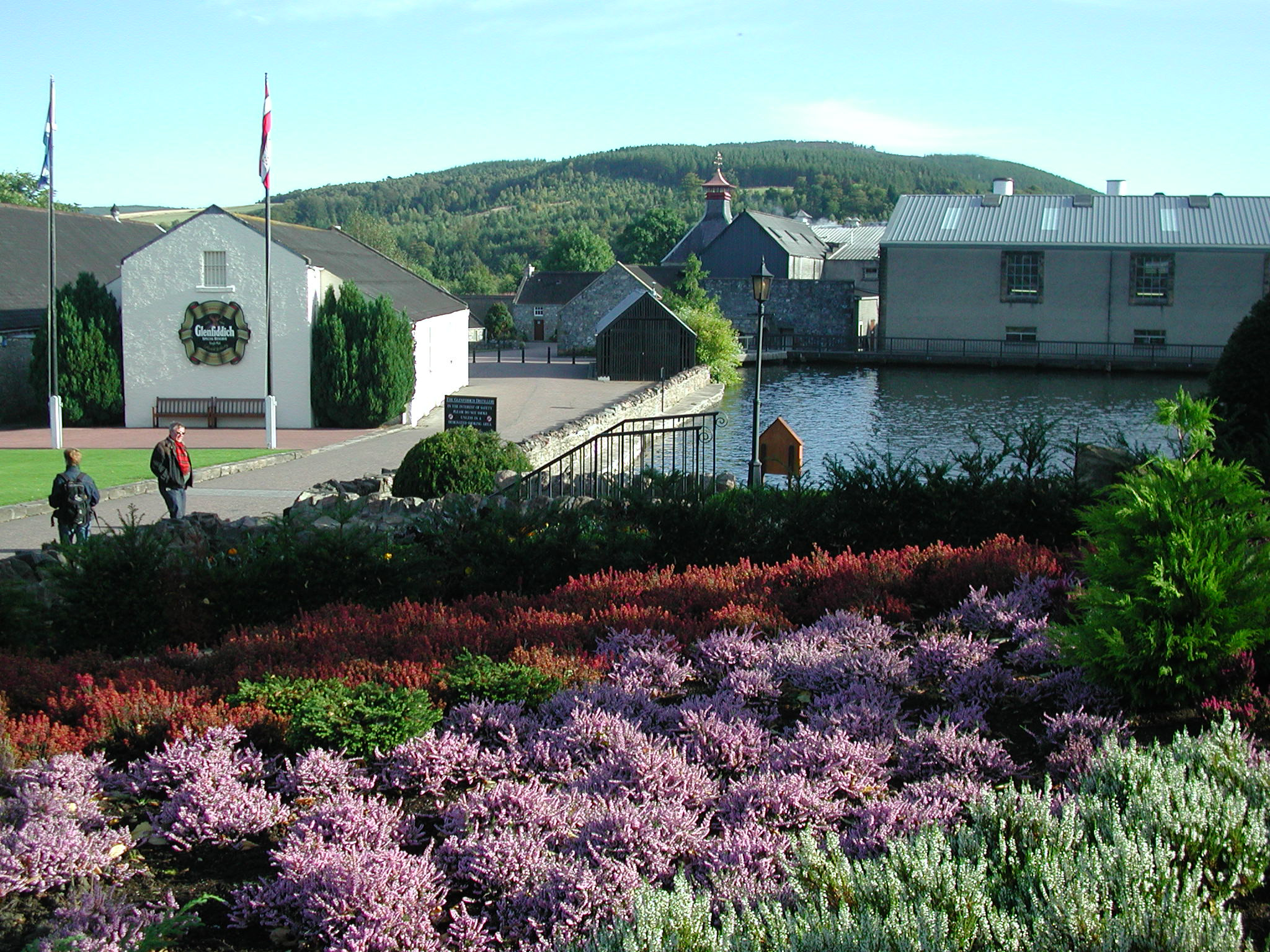
Glenfiddich (2005)

This dry, warm, region is a natural for whisky distillers because it is close to barley farms, contains the River Spey and is close to the Atlantic port of Garmouth. The water in the area is said to have "the lowest level of dissolved minerals" of any area in Scotland, and that may affect the taste of its whiskies. Another report explains that "quartzite at the source keeps high levels of minerals from mixing with the water".

The Visit Scotland website indicates that the region's whiskies have a fruity nature "ranging from ripe pears to sultanas" and some exhibit "sweet, caramel and fruity notes". Another review states that the use of peat is not common here, so many of the whiskies are not "smoky"; the article concluded that "typically, most Speyside whisky is fruity, sweet, and nutty, featuring notes of apple, honey, vanilla, and spice".

=== Benefits to the region ===
In addition to providing jobs and income for barley farmers and distillery employees in the region, whisky production has helped increase tourism. All regions of that produce Scotch Whisky benefit; the Scotch Whisky Association estimated in 2019 that whisky tourism in Scotland generates £68.3 million per year. The Association also stated that the industry supported 40,000 jobs and accounted for over £4 billion in exports for Scotland; the specific benefits for Speyside were not provided.

The region hosts an annual whisky festival known as "Spirit of Speyside".

Scotland's Malt Whisky Trail is a tourism initiative featuring seven working Speyside distilleries, a historic distillery (Dallas Dhu, now a museum) and the Speyside Cooperage. A 2012 BBC article recommends a leisurely tour, taking a day or two at each distillery to appreciate the local "traditions and lore". In 2017, tourism in the Moray Speyside area increased significantly, by 50,000 visitors, primarily because of the appeal of the Malt Whisky Trail in the region. A Trail rep stated (in summer 2019) that 60% of tourists to Speyside visit at least one distillery.

In addition to those on the Trail, some other distilleries also have visitor centres.

== List of Speyside distilleries ==
- Aberlour
- Allt-A-Bhainne
- Auchroisk
- Aultmore
- Ballindalloch
- Balmenach
- Balvenie
- BenRiach
- Benrinnes
- Benromach
- Braeval
- Cairn (Grantown-on-Spey)
- Cardhu
- Cragganmore
- Craigellachie
- Dailuaine
- Dallas Dhu
- Dalmunach
- Dufftown
- Dunphail
- Glen Elgin
- Glen Grant
- Glen Keith
- Glen Moray
- Glen Spey
- Glenallachie
- Glenburgie
- Glendullan
- Glenfarclas
- Glenfiddich
- Glenlivet
- Glenlossie
- Glenrothes
- Glentauchers
- Inchgower
- Kininvie
- Knockando
- Knockdhu
- Linkwood
- Longmorn
- The Macallan
- Mannochmore
- Miltonduff
- Mortlach
- Roseisle
- Speyburn
- Speyside
- Strathisla
- Strathmill
- Tamdhu
- Tamnavulin
- Tomintoul
- Tormore

== Closed Speyside distilleries ==
- Banff distillery (closed in 1983)
- Caperdonich distillery (closed in 2002)
- Coleburn distillery (set to reopen in 2027)
- Convalmore distillery (closed in 1985)
- Glen Albyn (demolished 1988)
- Glen Mhor (demolished in 1986)
- Imperial distillery (demolished in 2013, site of Dalmunuch)
- Parkmore distillery (closed in 1988)
- Pittyvaich distillery (demolished in 2002)
- Towiemore (closed in 1930)

== See also ==
- List of whisky brands
- List of whisky distilleries in Scotland
- Spirit of Speyside Whisky Festival
