= Tomintoul distillery =

Distillery in Speyside, Scotland

Coordinates: 57.312012°N 3.412366°W

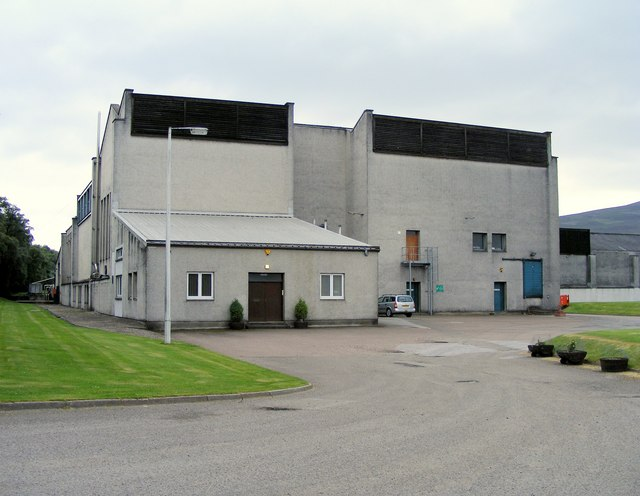
- The main building of the Tomintoul distillery
- Location: Kirkmichael, near Tomintoul
- Owner: Angus Dundee
- Founded: 1964
- Founder: Hey & Macleod and W. and S. Strong
- Status: Open
- Water source: Ballantruan spring
- No. of stills: 2 wash stills 2 spirit stills
- Capacity: 3,300,000 litres of pure alcohol per year
- Website: http://www.tomintoulwhisky.com/

Tomintoul
- Age(s): 10, 12, 14, 16, 21 and 33 years old
- Cask type(s): Oloroso and portwood finishes for the 12-year-old, other ages unspecified
- ABV: 40%

Tomintoul Peaty Tang
- Age(s): no age indication
- ABV: 40%

Tomintoul 1976 Vintage

Tomintoul distillery is a distillery in Kirkmichael, between Ballindalloch and Tomintoul in the Speyside region of Scotland, producing malt whisky for blends and bottled as single malts.

The distillery was founded in 1964. It doubled in capacity when two extra stills were installed in 1974, and it started bottling single malt whisky that year. It produces a range of single malts of different ages, a peated malt, and a vintage malt. The distillery is owned and operated by Angus Dundee Distillers, PLC, of London, England, which also owns and operates the Glencadam distillery.

In 2009 Tomintoul entered the Guinness Book of World Records by producing the largest bottle of whisky in the world, containing 105.3 litres of 14-year-old Tomintoul malt whisky.

== History ==
It was founded in 1964 by the Glasgow whisky traders Hey & Macleod and W. and S. Strong, which set up a working company, Tomintoul Distillery Ltd. Production, to manage the distillery At its founding the distillery had one wash still and one spirit still. The distillery was bought by Scottish and Universal Investment Trust in 1973 which doubled the production capacity by placing an extra pair of steam heated stills in the next year. That year, the distilleries 10 year anniversary, they also released the first bottling of their malt. Scottish and Universal was sold on to Whyte & Mackay (which was owned by Brent Walker) in 1989.

Whyte & Mackay itself was bought by American Brands in 1990, and in the same year, Tomintoul started selling a 12-year-old bottling of its malt in a distinctively styled bottle. The distillery itself was sold off to Angus Dundee in 2000, and under their management, the official bottling became the 10-year-old malt, sold in more conventional bottles. The official bottling portfolio expanded in the next years, with a 16-year-old malt in 2003 and a 27-year-old malt in 2004. A year later in 2005 a 1991 peaty vintage was released under the name 'Old Ballantruan', bottled at 50% ABV, followed by 12 year old finished on Oloroso butts, a vatting of unpeated and peated Tomintoul malts under the name 'Peaty Tang', and a 1976 vintage, all released around 2008.

== Production ==
Tomintoul has two wash and two spirit stills, which are all steam heated, and have a total capacity of producing 3,300,000 litres of pure alcohol per year. It uses six stainless steel washbacks, 3 larger and 3 smaller. The water it uses for its whisky comes from the Ballantruan source. Cooling water is drawn from two nearby ponds.

The distillery offers three ranges of malts. The Tomintoul brand is a single malt offered for the ages 10, 12, 14, 16, 21 and 33 years old. The 12-year-old bottlings are available only in portwood and oloroso finishes, the others have no special finishes. It also produces a vatting of peated and unpeated malts under the name Peaty Tang, which bears no age indication. In the US, this offering is labeled "Tomintoul, the gentile dram with a peaty tang – Speyside Glenlivet", in a 40%ABV 750ml bottling. Additionally, it has released a peated single malt called Ballantruan. Lastly, it bottles a 1976 vintage. The 33-year-old offering was chosen as the best Speyside whisky of 2010 in the Whiskymag World Whiskies Awards.
