= Glenallachie distillery =

Whisky distillery in Moray, Scotland, UK

Coordinates: 57.45518°N 3.22871°W

GlenAllachie distillery
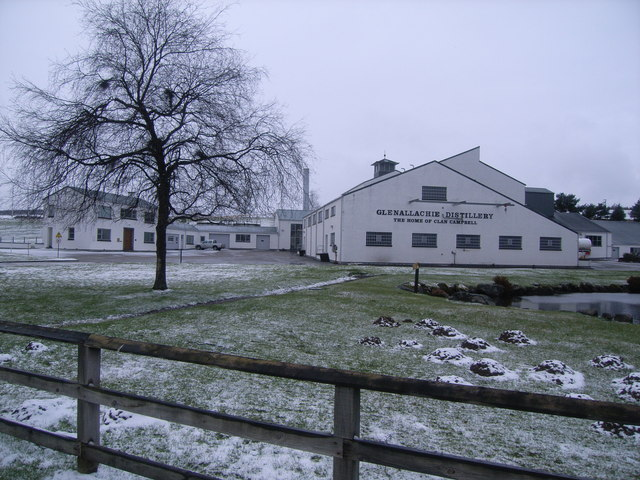
- The grounds of the GlenAllachie distillery

Region: Speyside
- Location: Aberlour
- Owner: The GlenAllachie Distillers Co Limited
- Founded: 1967
- Founder: Mackinlay McPherson
- Architect: W. Delme Evans
- Status: Open
- Water source: Sources on Ben Rinnes
- No. of stills: 2 wash stills 2 spirit stills
- Capacity: 4,000,000 litres of pure alcohol per year
- Website: www.theglenallachie.com

GlenAllachie distillery (/ɡlɛnˈæləxi/) is a Speyside, single malt whisky distillery at Aberlour founded in 1967, which sits at the foot of Ben Rinnes.

Previously, the distillery produced whisky mainly for blends; it has, however, since been relaunched as a distillery known for its fruity, single malt expressions. In July 2017, it was announced that Chivas Brothers agreed to sell GlenAllachie to former BenRiach MD Billy Walker, Trisha Savage and ex-Inver House Distillers MD Graham Stevenson, who came together to form The GlenAllachie Distillers Company. It is now one of Scotland's few independently owned and managed distilleries.

== History ==
The GlenAllachie distillery was built in 1967 by Mackinlay McPherson. It was bought and mothballed by Invergordon Distillers in 1985. They sold it to Campbell Distillers in 1989, who restarted the distillery. In 2017, the distillery was sold to Billy Walker, Graham Stevenson and Trisha Savage, who came together as The GlenAllachie Distillers Company Limited, along with two blended Scotch whisky brands - White Heather and MacNair's. In 2024, the distillery carried out a rebranding. This gave the bottlings a new look and limited special bottlings were henceforth summarised under the name "Wood Collection". The rebranding also introduced the slogan "whisky in good hands".

== Building ==
The building of the GlenAllachie distillery was designed by S. Lothian Barclay from Lothian, Barclay Jarvis & Boys and William Delme-Evans It is located at the foot of Ben Rinnes, close to the Lour burn. The grounds has ponds that are fed by the Lour, that provide water for cooling. In June 2023, the distillery completed the £600,000 upgrade of the visitor centre.

== Production ==
The distillery draws its water from spring fed and snow water fed streams on the North East of Ben Rinnes. Although the distillery has the capacity to produce 4 million litres of alcohol (LOA), they have reduced their production to just 500,000 LOA and extended their fermentation time to 160 hours. The distillery uses a semi-lauter mash tun, and six stainless steel washbacks. It uses two lantern shaped wash stills, and two onion shaped spirit stills for distillation. As the distillery was designed to be gravity fed, it has horizontal condensers which makes it easier to alter or maintain the temperature. In their 16 on-site warehouses there are currently over 50,000 casks, some of which date back to the 1970s.
