= Tamnavulin distillery =

Scotch whisky distillery

Coordinates: 57°19′03″N 3°18′28″W

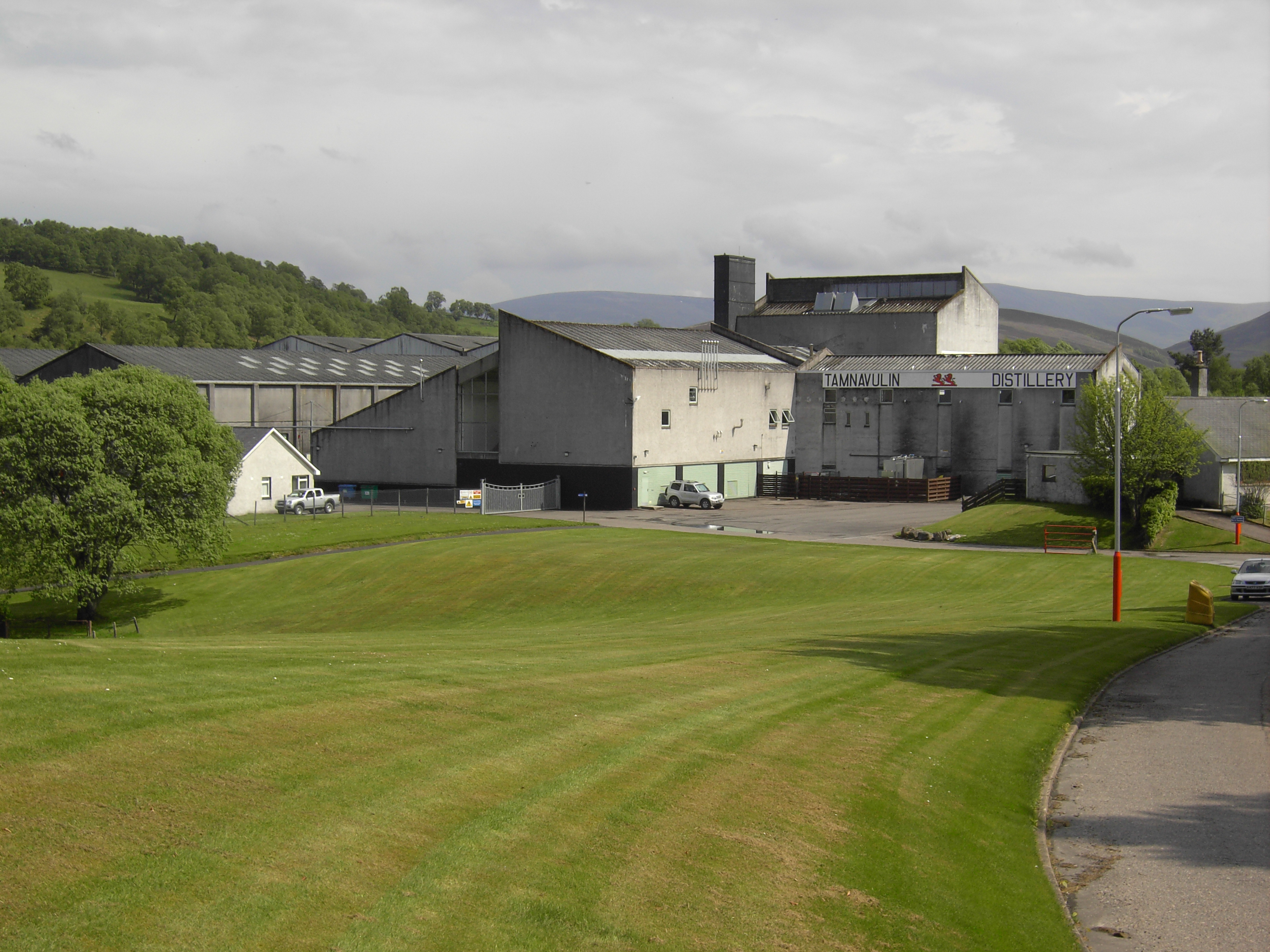

Region: Speyside
- Location: Tomnavoulin, Ballindalloch, Banffshire, Scotland, United Kingdom
- Owner: Whyte & Mackay
- Founded: 1966
- Status: Operational
- Water source: Springs in Easterton
- No. of stills: 3 wash stills 3 spirit stills
- Capacity: 4,000,000 litres/year

Tamnavulin distillery is a producer of single malt Scotch whisky that was founded in 1966.

The distillery is operated by Whyte & Mackay, which Philippines-based Alliance Global owns.

== History ==
In 1966, Tamnavulin-Glenlivet Distillery Co. Ltd, a subsidiary of Invergordon Distillers Ltd. built the Tamnavulin distillery in response to the growing demand for malt whisky by blenders such as Whyte & Mackay, Crawfords, and Mackinlay's.

In 1993, Whyte & Mackay purchased Invergordon Distillers, including the distilleries Bruichladdich, Isle of Jura, and Tullibardine.

The Tamnavulin distillery was mothballed in May 1995.

In 2007, United Spirits purchased Whyte & Mackay and the distillery began operating once again.

In 2014, United Spirits sold Whyte & Mackay to Philippines-based Alliance Global for £430m.

Along with Invergordon distillery, it produces whisky for Whyte & Mackay blended Scotch whisky brands.

== Operation ==
With its nine washbacks and six stills, Tamnavulin is equipped to produce up to 4.3 million litres of alcohol per year. The distillation water supply comes from natural underground springs.

The Distillery does not currently have a visitor centre and is closed to the public

== Products ==
In 2016, Tamnavulin was re-launched in the UK as a single malt to mark the 50th anniversary of the distillery. In 2019, a Sherry finish was launched, and in 2020 three red wine cask finishes were launched, a French Cabernet Sauvignon, a Spanish Grenache and a German Pinot Noir. A Tempranillo wine cask finish was also produced for sale in Global Travel Retail. In 2021 an American Cabernet Sauvignon cask finish was added to the red wine series, and in 2022 a white wine cask finish, Sauvignon Blanc, was launched.
