= Pittyvaich distillery =

1974–1993 whisky distillery in Scotland

Coordinates: 57°26′11″N 03°07′52″W

Pittyvaich Distillery
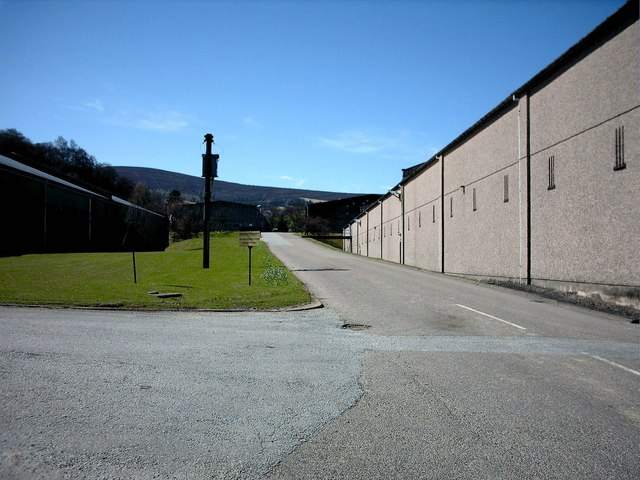
- Bonded warehouses at the site of the Pittyvaich distillery

Region: Speyside
- Location: Dufftown, Scotland
- Owner: Diageo
- Founded: 1974
- Status: Closed/demolished
- Water source: Bailliemore & Convalleys springs
- Demolished: 2002

Pittyvaich distillery was a Speyside single malt Scotch whisky distillery in Dufftown, Scotland.

Pittyvaich operated between 1974 and 1993.

== History ==
The Pittyvaich distillery, built in 1974 by Arthur Bell & Sons, was among the youngest Scottish distilleries while it was operating. It stood near the Dufftown Distillery in Dufftown.

Originally built to provide malt whisky for blends, Pittyvaich eventually did release an official bottling in 1991. Prior to the official bottling, a number of independent bottlers (including Signatory Vintage and Cadenhead's) released Pittyvaich as a single malt.

The distillery was demolished in 2002.
