= Ballindalloch distillery =

Scotch whiskey distillery

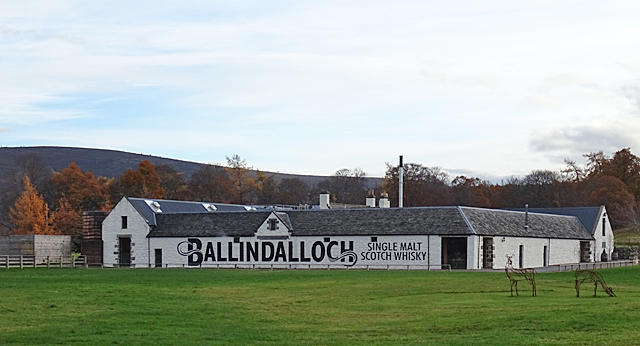

Region: Speyside
- Location: Ballindalloch, Banffshire
- Owner: Macpherson-Grant family
- Founded: 2014
- Status: Operational
- Water source: Garline Springs
- No. of stills: 1 Wash Still; 1 Spirit Still
- Capacity: 100,000 L

Ballindalloch distillery is a Speyside single malt Scotch whisky distillery located in Ballindalloch, Banffshire, Scotland.

== History ==
The Macpherson-Grant family began looking for a use for old farm buildings on the grounds of Speyside's Ballindalloch Castle in late summer 2011, and they decided to build a distillery, but keeping the old buildings preserved as far as possible.

Ballindalloch distillery began production in September 2014.

The barley used was grown on the estate, and the spirit matured here, allowing the Macpherson-Grants to describe Ballindalloch as Scotland's first single estate distillery. The inaugural bottling was expected in 2022.

In the Whisky Magazine Awards 2022, Ballindalloch distillery won the prize for Craft Producer.
