= Lochside distillery =

1957–2004 whisky distillery in Scotland

Coordinates: 56°43′19.0″N 2°28′1.3″W

Lochside Distillery
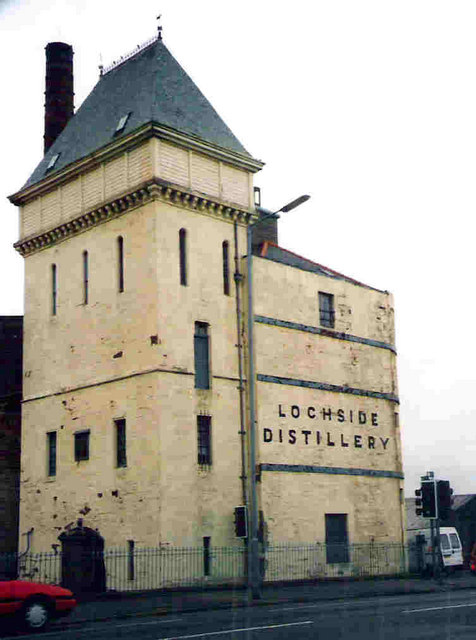

Region: Highland
- Location: Montrose, Angus
- Owner: Chivas Brothers
- Founded: 1957
- Status: Closed/demolished
- Water source: Borehole aquifer
- Mothballed: 1992
- Demolished: 2004

Lochside distillery was a Highland single malt Scotch whisky and grain whisky distillery in Montrose, Angus.

The distillery was owned by Macnab Distilleries Ltd. and latterly, by Allied Distillers, a subsidiary of the former British drinks and restaurant group Allied Domecq that was bought by Pernod Richard.

== History ==
The distillery started life as a brewery and the actual buildings were built in 1781. James Deuchar & Sons Ltd., a Newcastle upon Tyne based brewery (which would go on to form Scottish & Newcastle) owned the building during the 19th Century. The brewery was closed by Scottish & Newcastle before being quickly purchased in 1957 by Macnab Distilleries Ltd of which Joseph W. Hobbs, the proprietor of the Ben Nevis Distillery in Fort William, was a shareholder. The brewery was converted to a distillery and followed the Ben Nevis Distillery in producing both malt and grain whisky. The blended whisky brand Sandy Macnab, was created around this time.

Macnab Distilleries Ltd was purchased by Spanish whisky manufacturer Destilerías y Crianza del Whisky S.A. (popularly known as DYC) in 1973. They were in turn purchased by British drinks company Allied Distillers to form Allied Domecq, who were purchased by Pernod Ricard in 2005.

The distillery was closed during 1992 and the site earmarked for redevelopment. The distillery was finally demolished during 2004-2005 and the site has been turned into housing.

The Sandy Macnab brand name and the Macnab Distilleries Ltd company name are now owned by Pernod Ricard through their Chivas Regal subsidiary, following several takeovers.

== Production ==
Lochside was latterly fitted with a cast iron mash tun and open stainless steel washbacks. Distillation was carried out using 2 wash stills and 2 spirit stills. The distillery was also fitted with grain stills, which, under DYC's tenure, were unused. Spirit was matured in ex-bourbon casks.

The majority of the spirit produced at this time was shipped to Spain for use in DYC Spanish whisky, and the remainder used for the firm's Sandy Macnab brand of blended whisky or for bottling as a single malt aged 10 Years.

Sandy Macnab was generally an export only brand and was widely available in Southern European markets.

Limited stocks of Lochside Single Malt remain available.

== See also ==
- List of whisky brands
- List of distilleries in Scotland
