= Richard Paterson =

Scottish author and whisky expert

Richard Paterson OBE
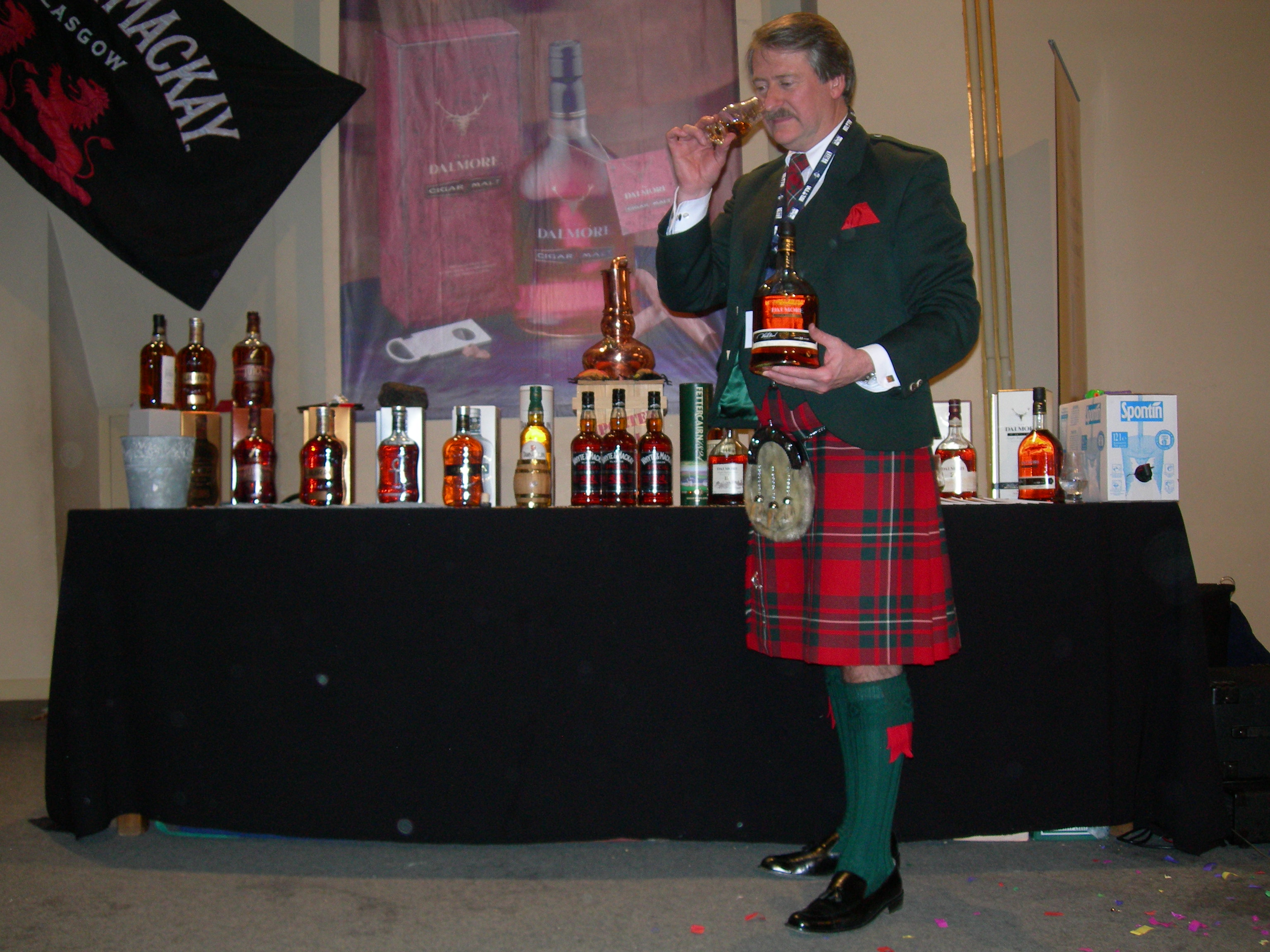
- Born: Richard Paterson; January 31, 1949 (age 77); Glasgow, Scotland
- Occupation: Master blender
- Years active: 1966–present
- Known for: Master blender at The Dalmore; nicknamed "The Nose"

Richard Paterson (born 31 January 1949), OBE is a Scottish author and whisky expert. He is a master blender with over five decades of experience in the whisky industry. In the industry, he is nicknamed "The Nose" and is seen as one of the most respected blenders in the Scottish malt whisky industry.

== Early life and education ==
Richard Paterson was born in Glasgow, Scotland. He is a third-generation master blender, as was his father and grandfather. His father, Gus Paterson, managed the family whisky broker firm, W. R. Paterson & Co., which significantly influenced Richard's career path.

== Career ==
Paterson began his career in 1966 at A. Gillies & Co., a whisky blending firm, where he started as an office junior and gained knowledge in whisky blending and production. In 1970, he joined Whyte & Mackay, becoming their master blender in 1975. During his tenure, he was instrumental in developing and maintaining the quality of their whisky brands, including The Dalmore, Jura, Fettercairn, and Tamnavulin malts, as well as the Whyte & Mackay blend.

He previously held a USD 2.5 million insurance policy on his nose with Lloyd’s of London but this has now lapsed.

In 2011, he was responsible for creating a modern blend using a retrieved bottle of Ernest Shackleton’s whisky from 1907 that is now sold commercially. To create the whisky, he spent up to six weeks in full laboratory conditions to analyse the whisky.

In 2020, after celebrating his 50th anniversary with Whyte & Mackay, Paterson took on the role of master blender at Wolfcraig Distillery, a new venture aimed at creating a Highland single malt Scotch whisky. He continues to serve as master blender for The Dalmore while contributing his expertise to Wolfcraig whisky.

In 2023, he became a viral sensation on TikTok with tens of millions of views on the platform.

== Awards and recognition ==
Throughout his career, Paterson has received numerous accolades, including:

- Icon of Whisky Lifetime Achievement Award
- Spirit of Scotland Award, International Wine and Spirit Competition
- Induction into the Whisky Magazine Hall of Fame of the World Drinks Awards.

In June 2022, he was made an Officer of the Order of the British Empire for his services to the Scottish whisky industry.

He is responsible for the International Wine and Spirit Competition Scotch Whisky Awards and is an IWSC judge.

He is also Chair of the International Spirits Challenge.

== Publications ==
In 2008, Paterson authored Goodness Nose, a book that delves into the art of whisky blending and his experiences in the industry.

== Personal life ==
Beyond his professional endeavors, Paterson is involved in charitable activities, particularly with the Benevolent Trust in Scotland, supporting individuals in the drinks industry facing hardships. He is an active member of the Trades House of Glasgow assuming the role of Deacon Convenor in 2024 and thereby becoming the "3rd citizen of Glasgow". He is on the management committee of the society, Keepers of the Quaich.
