= GlenWyvis distillery =

Coordinates: 57°36′53.359″N 04°27′23.781″W

Region: Highland
- Location: Dingwall
- Founded: 2015
- Founder: John Mckenzie
- Status: Operational
- No. of stills: 2 wash stills 2 spirit stills

GlenWyvis
- Cask type(s): European Sherry Hogshead; American Oak Refill Hogshead; American Standard Barrel; European Sherry Quarter; European Sherry Firki

Glenwyvis distillery is a Scotch whisky and gin distillery located in Dingwall, Scotland.

The distillery is a co-operative owned by a group of crowdfunders and is entirely powered by renewable energies like hydro, wind, solar, and chip biomass heating systems. Its name comes from the idea of carrying on old traditions of the past and contemplates two previous distilleries of the area, the Ben Wyvis in Dingwall and the Glenskiach in Evanton. The distillery is not open to the public and does not have a visitor centre at present.

== History ==
The Glenwyvis distillery was founded in 2015 by John Mckenzie, a farmer, green energy advocate and a commercial helicopter pilot.

In 2016 a crowdsourced fundraising campaign was launched and in just seventy-seven days more than two thousands persons, of which more than half coming from the same geographical area, offered around £2.6 million.

After a second share offer Glenwyvis the company has over three thousand shareholders.

The distillery itself was built in 2017 on an uphill terrain few miles from the town of Dingwall. (a return of distilling to Dingwall, which has been without a distillery since 1926), with the opening happening on 30 November 2017 (St. Andrew's Day, the Scottish National Day).

In 2018 Glenwyvis distillery started both whisky and gin production with the lead of master distiller Duncan Tait. After one year, more than five hundred casks were resting onsite. In 2018–19, Glenwyvis reached 39248 liters of whisky and 3576 liters of Premium GoodWill gin.

In 2018 GlenWyvis Distillery and the company Geotourist created an app to promote a walking tour experience in Dingwall.

In October 2019 a fire broke out at the woodchip store, reporting limited damage in the wood chip storage, any spread occurred to the boiler or anywhere else.

During the COVID-19 pandemic in Scotland, the distillery held a live online cookery demo from Master Chef Gary Maclean who agreed on creating some delicatessen making use of Goodwill Gin.

Currently, by September 2023, Glenwyvis distillery offers four types of gin, one type of spirit and two 4-year-old single malt whiskies.

== Awards ==
- 2019 Scottish Gin Awards: Best Newcomer
- World Gin Awards 2019: Bronze Medal
- IWSC Bronze 2019: GlenWyvis GoodWill Gin
- IWSC Gold 2019: GlenWyvis Christmas GoodWill Spiced Gin
- 2019 Scottish Rural Awards: Artisan Drink
- World Gin Awards 2020: Gold Medal
- IWSC Silver 2020: Cask Matured Goodwill Quercus Alba Gin
- IWSC Silver 2020: Glenwyvis New Make Spirit

== See also ==
- List of whisky brands
- List of gin brands
- List of distilleries in Scotland
