= Dailuaine distillery =

Whisky distillery in Strathspey, Scotland

Coordinates: 57°27′11.3″N 3°16′22.6″W

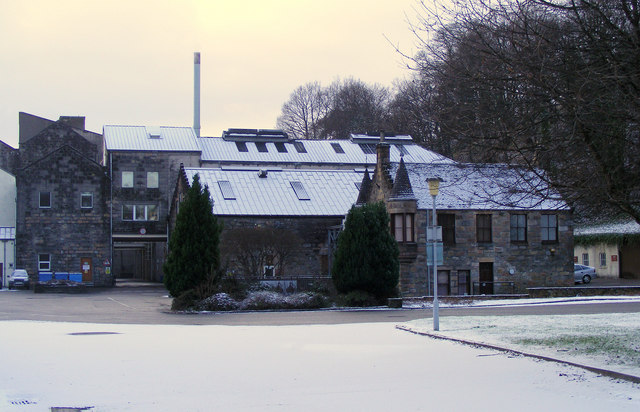
- Location: Charlestown-of-Aberlour, Strathspey
- Owner: Diageo
- Founded: 1852
- Status: Active
- Water source: The Bailliemullich Burn
- No. of stills: 3 wash stills (18.700 L); 3 spirit stills (20.500 L)
- Capacity: 3,370,000 litres

Dailuaine distillery (Scottish Gaelic: Dail Uaine, [t̪alˈuəɲə], "Green Meadow") is a single malt whisky distillery in Charlestown-of-Aberlour, Strathspey, Scotland.

== History ==
The Distillery was founded in 1852 by William Mackenzie. When he died in 1865 his widow leased the distillery to James Fleming, a banker from Aberlour. Together with William Mackenzie's son he founded Mackenzie and Company.

- 1863 Branch line opened to the distillery from Carron station on the Strathspey Railway, 1.25 miles long.
- 1884 Dailuaine is renovated and enlarged.
- 1891 Dailuaine-Glenlivet Distillery Ltd. was founded. In 1898, Dailuaine-Glenlivet and Talisker Distillery Ltd. are fused to Dailuaine-Talisker Distilleries Ltd.
- 1899 Charles C. Doig designs a new distillery with a pagoda like roof that becomes the standard design for Scottish distilleries.
- 1915 Thomas Mackenzie died and the company was sold to John Dewar & Sons, John Walker & Sons and James Buchanan & Co. one year later.
- 1917 a fire destroyed the pagoda-roof. The distillery had to close, reopened three years later and was bought by Distillers Company Limited (DCL) in 1925.
- 1960 the Distillery is completely renovated and is enlarged from four to six stills. Since 1983 the malt is no longer produced inhouse.
- 1939 New 0-4-0ST loco purchased from the Caledonia Works of Andrew Barclay Sons & Co. Ltd., Kilmarnock (AB2073/1939) to work the branch to the mainline at Carron. Loco named after the distillery, DAILUAINE.
- 1987 Dailuaine was taken over by United Distillers (UD).

== See also ==
- Speyside single malt
- Whisky
- Scotch whisky
- List of whisky brands
- List of distilleries in Scotland
