= Mannochmore distillery =

Coordinates: 57°35′55.6″N 3°19′11.9″W

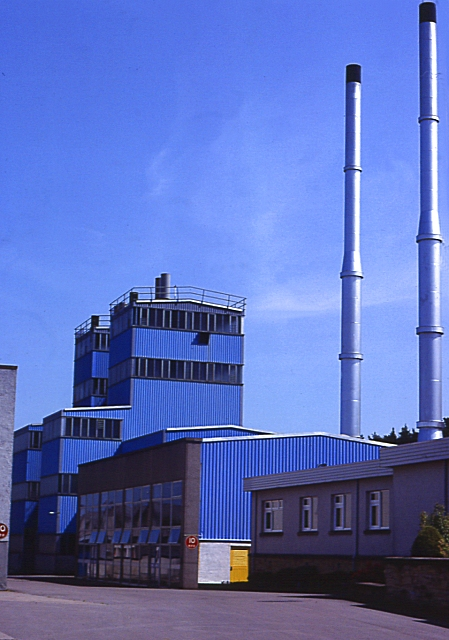
- Location: Elgin
- Owner: Diageo
- Founded: 1971
- Founder: John Haig & Co.
- Status: Active
- Water source: Bardon Burn
- No. of stills: 3 Wash stills: each 14,400 L; 3 Spirit stills: each 17,000 L
- Capacity: 3,200,000 L

Mannochmore distillery is a Scottish Whisky distillery near Elgin.

== History ==
The distillery was founded in 1971 by John Haig & Co. Between 1985 and 1989, production was suspended and the distillery closed; it was then reopened and in 1992 started producing a Mannochmore single malt. In 1996 the black Loch Dhu ("Black Loch" in Scottish Gaelic) single malt whisky was introduced, and has been gaining market favour despite (or because of) the rather unusual appearance and taste. After a brief re-closure in 1995, the distillery only produces for twelve months and then has a break of twelve months alternating with the nearby Glenlossie distillery, with which it shares the employees.

As of 2008, Mannochmore distillery has been operated year-round by its own crew of employees, though the (in)famous Loch Dhu has not been made since 1999.

== Production ==
The water of the region Speyside, which the distillery belongs to, comes from Bardon Burn. The malt is purchased from Castle Head Maltings in Elgin. The distillery has one mash tun (12 tonnes), eight washbacks (54,000 L), three washstills (14,400 L) and three spirit stills (17,000 L). The distillery works run on steam.

== See also ==
- Whisky
- Single malt whisky
- List of distilleries in Scotland
