= Spirit of Speyside Whisky Festival =

Whisky festival in Speyside, Scotland

The Spirit of Speyside Whisky Festival is held annually, normally over the first weekend of May. The festival celebrates malt whisky with a series of whisky inspired events across Speyside, Scotland. It started in 2000.

In 2006 the Spirit of Speyside Whisky Festival Ltd, a not for profit company, limited by guarantee, was incorporated to run the festival. The festival was held virtually in 2021.

== See also ==
- Speyside single malt
