= Dufftown distillery =

Whisky distillery in Moray, Scotland

Coordinates: 57.435748°N 3.127820°W

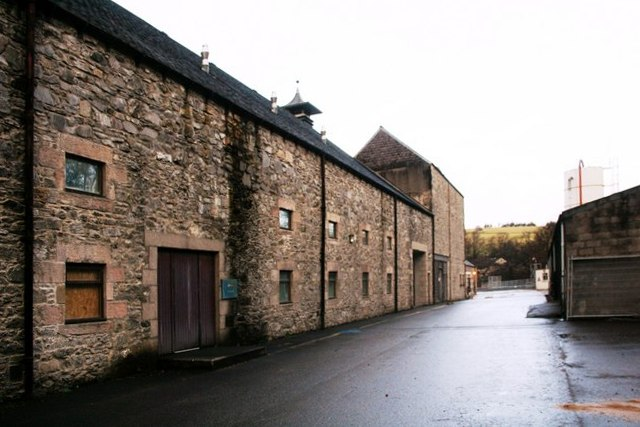

Region: Speyside
- Location: Dufftown, Moray
- Owner: Diageo
- Founded: 1895
- Water source: Jock's Well, Conval Hills Sprin
- No. of stills: 3 wash stills 3 spirit stills
- Capacity: 4,000,000 litres

Dufftown distillery is a Scotch whisky distillery in Dufftown, Moray, Scotland.

Founded in 1895 as "Dufftown-Glenlivet Distillery", the distillery is currently owned by Diageo. The distillery operates six stills and has a capacity of 4,000,000 litres (880,000 imperial gallons; 1,100,000 US gallons) per year. It has three wash stills with a capacity of 13,100 litres (2,900 imperial gallons; 3,500 US gallons) and three spirit stills with a capacity of 15,300 litres (3,400 imperial gallons; 4,000 US gallons).

Its Speyside whisky is a component in Arthur Bell & Sons Ltd blended bottlings.

It also markets single malt scotch whiskies under the names Singleton of Dufftown and Dufftown Aged 15 Years.

Other active distilleries in Dufftown include Balvenie, Glendullan, Glenfiddich, Kininvie and Mortlach.

== See also ==
- List of whisky brands
- List of distilleries in Scotland
