= Roseisle distillery =

Scotch whisky distillery

Coordinates: 57°40′6″N 3°28′24″W

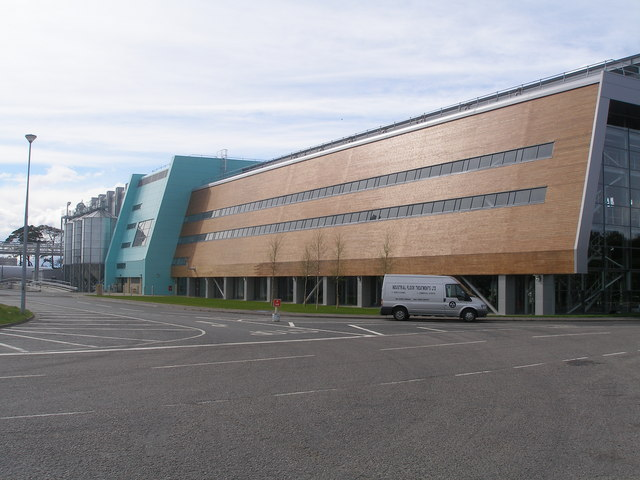

Region: Speyside
- Location: Roseisle
- Owner: Diageo
- Founded: 2010
- Water source: Borehole
- No. of stills: 7 wash stills 7 spirit stills
- Capacity: 10,000,000 L

Roseisle distillery is a Speyside single malt Scotch whisky distillery, in Roseisle, near Elgin, Moray, in the Strathspey region of Scotland.

== History ==
The distillery is owned by multinational drinks company Diageo.

In 2007, Diageo announce plans to build a new distillery in Roseisle.

The distillery opened in 2010 and is the largest-ever built at 3,000 sq m and a cost of £40million. The distillery is environmentally friendly with some byproducts recycled on site. The distillery has won the Scottish Design Award 2010 as well as the RICS Scotland 2010 Award (Sustainability Project of the Year and overall Project of the Year).

Roseisle was built with the intention of only serving Diageo's blended whisky production needs, even in an era where many formerly blend-only distilleries have rolled out regular single malt releases. Roseisle single malts are released sporadically as part of the Diageo Special Releases program, with the first such edition unveiled in September 2023. In 2024, malt whisky from the distillery was used in Johnnie Walker Black Ruby.

== See also ==
- List of whisky brands
- List of whisky distilleries in Scotland
