= Ballindalloch Castle =

Castle in Banffshire, Scotland

Ballindaloch Castle
- Part of Banffshire
- Near Ballindalloch, Banffshire, Scotland
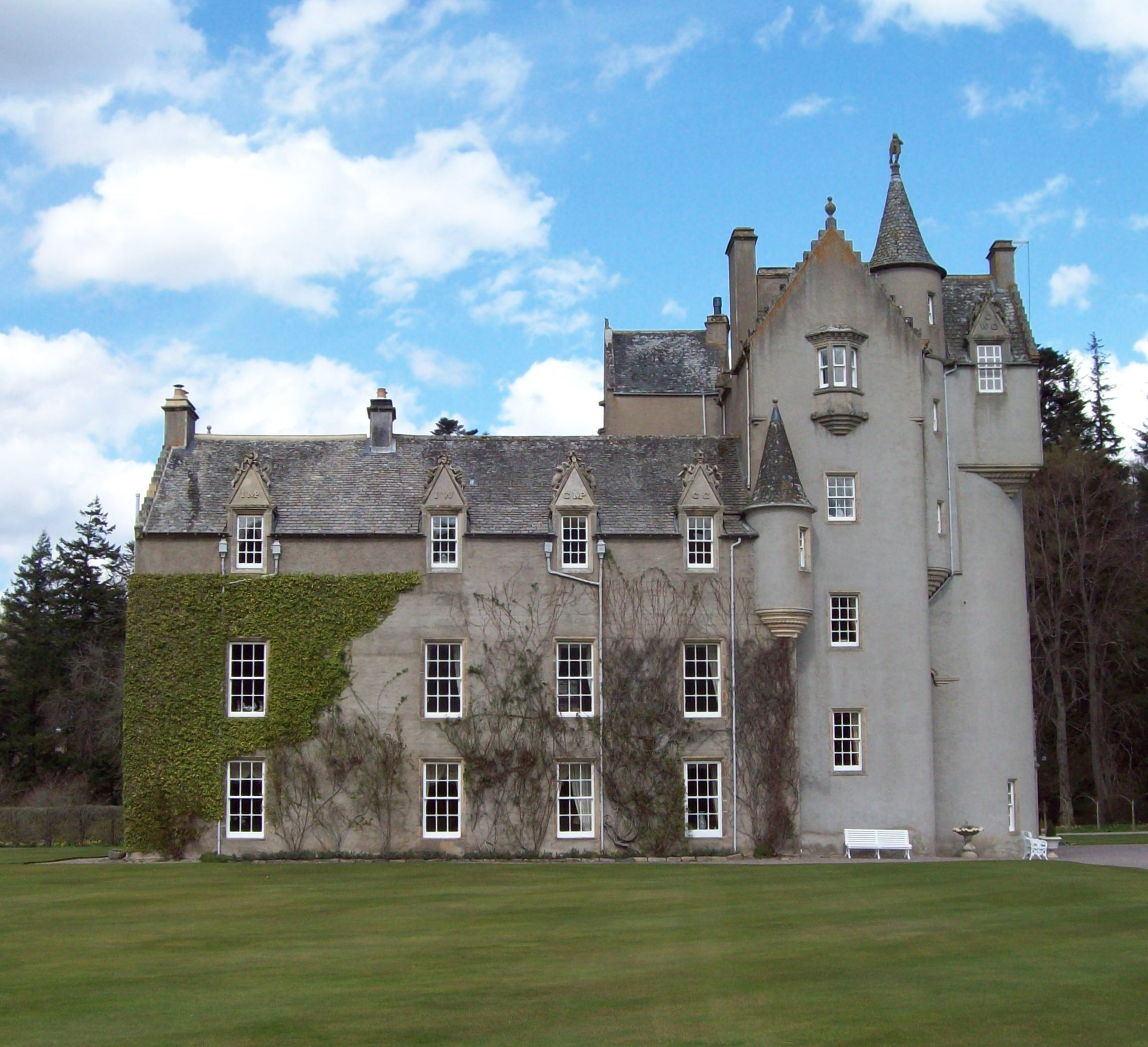

Site information
- Type: Castle

Location
- Location in Moray, Scotland
- Coordinates: 57.4118°N 3.3693°W

Site history
- Built: 16th century

Ballindalloch Castle, known as the "pearl of the north", is a Scottish castle located in Ballindalloch, Banffshire, Scotland. It has been the family home of Macpherson-Grants since 1546.

== History ==
The lands were originally owned by the Ballindalloch family but in 1499 they passed to the Grants.

The first tower of the Z plan castle was built in 1546.

In 1590 the widow of the Grant of Ballindalloch married John Gordon, son Thomas Gordon of Cluny. John Grant, former Tutor of Ballindaloch, the administrator of the estate, killed one of John Grant's servants. This started a feud between the Earl of Huntly and the Earl of Moray. The Earl of Huntly went to Ballindalloch in November 1590 to arrest the Tutor. The Chief of Grant, John Grant of Freuchie promised to deliver the Tutor and his accomplices, accused of murder and other crimes, to Huntly Castle. However, Freuchie joined with the Tutor's men and the Earl of Moray, and came to Darnaway Castle, and there shot pistols at Huntly's officers and cannon from the castle, and killed John Gordon, brother of the Laird of Cluny.

In 1645, the castle was sacked, plundered and burned by James Graham, the first Marquess of Montrose, after the Battle of Inverlochy, but it was restored in the same year.

Extensions were added in 1770 by General James Grant of the American Wars of Independence (whose ghost is said to haunt the castle) and in 1850 by the architect Thomas MacKenzie. Further extensions carried out in 1878 were mostly demolished during modernisation enacted in 1965. It has been continuously occupied by Russell and Macpherson-Grant families throughout its existence.

The castle houses an important collection of 17th century Spanish paintings.

The castle grounds contain a 20th-century rock garden and a 17th-century dovecote. The rivers Spey and Avon flow through the grounds, offering excellent fishing. The famous Aberdeen Angus cattle herd resides in the castle estate.

Today, the castle is still occupied by the Macpherson-Grant family. It is open to tourists during the summer months and a number of workshops on its grounds are in active use.

== Traditions ==
It is said that the original intention was to build at a better site defensively, but when building commenced whatever was built in the day was thrown down at night. Eventually the laird, annoyed by the problem, heard a mysterious voice saying "Build in the cow haughs, and you will meet with no interruptions." He did so, and there was no further problem with the building.

== Whisky ==
With the assistance of a £1.2 million grant from the Scottish Government, the owners of the castle set up the Ballindalloch distillery on the estate farm. The distillery commenced production in September 2014.

== Ghostlore ==
The dining room of Ballindalloch has associated ghostlore and is said to be haunted by a ghost known as The Green Lady. The green lady is a reoccurring character in Scottish ghostlore stories about castles.
