= Caperdonich distillery =

Scottish whiskey distillery

Coordinates: 57°31′51″N 03°12′25″W

Caperdonich Distillery
Region: Speyside
- Location: Rothes, Scotland
- Owner: Chivas Brothers
- Founded: 1898
- Status: Closed/demolished
- Water source: Caperdonich Burn
- No. of stills: 2 wash, 2 spirit
- Demolished: 2010

Caperdonich distillery was a Speyside single malt Scotch whisky distillery in Rothes, Scotland.

Caperdonich operated between 1898 and 1902, and then again between 1965 and 2002. Caperdonich whisky was a component of some blends of Chivas Regal.

== History ==
Caperdonich, originally known as "Glen Grant #2", was built in 1898 by the founders of the Glen Grant distillery, J. & J. Grant. Glen Grant #2 closed after four years, and was dormant until 1965, when it was rebuilt by Glenlivet Distilleries Ltd. By that time, British law prohibited simultaneously operating distilleries from using the same name, and Glen Grant #2 was reopened as "Caperdonich". In 1967, two steam-heated pot stills were added. Technological advances allowed the distillery to be run by only two people.

The distillery was sold to Seagram in 1977, and sold again to Pernod Ricard in 2001. One year after purchasing Caperdonich, Pernod Ricard closed the distillery. In autumn 2010 the distillery was demolished. One pair of copper stills was sold to Belgian Owl distillery, while the copper other pair of stills and mash tun were sold and repurposed for use at the Falkirk distillery.
