= Linkwood distillery =

Whisky distillery in Elgin, Scotland

Coordinates: 57.635448°N 3.286238°W

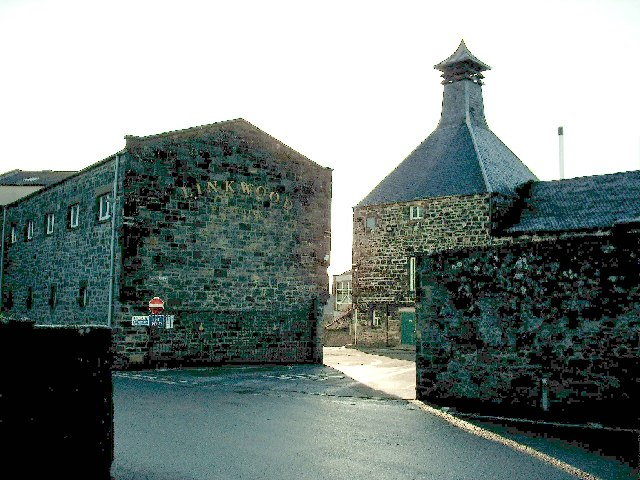

Region: Speyside
- Location: Elgin, Scotland
- Owner: Diageo
- Founded: 1821
- Status: Operational
- Water source: springs near Milbuies Loch
- No. of stills: 3 wash, 3 spirit (1 wash, 1 spirit in Linkwood A, 2 wash 2 spirit in Linkwood B)
- Capacity: 2,500,000 litres
- Mothballed: 1941 to 1945, 1985 to 1990

Linkwood Flora & Fauna
- Age(s): 12 Years

Rare Malts Linkwood
- Age(s): 26 Years, 30 Years

Linkwood Sp. Releases 2016
- Age(s): 37 Years, 1978 Vintage
- ABV: 50.3 ABV

Linkwood distillery is a Speyside single malt Scotch whisky distillery in Elgin, in the Speyside region of Scotland. It is owned by the British drinks giant Diageo.

== History ==
The distillery was built in 1821 by Peter Brown with two stills, and started production in 1825 with a capacity of 4,500 litres per year. The distillery was operated by James Walker until Brown's death in 1868, after which the distillery went under the control of his son, William Brown.

Between 1872 and 1873 William Brown, the son of Peter Brown designed and built a new distillery with help of architect Methven, replacing the old one on the same location. The new distillery had a capacity of 227,000 litres per year. After William Browns death, the Linkwood-Glenlivet company was created by Browns family in 1898 and brought to the stock exchange. The distillery was then further extended to a capacity of 454,000 litres per year.

In 1902 Innes Cameron joined the Linkwood-Glenlivet company and became managing director of the Linkwood distillery until his death in 1932. By that time he was the largest shareholder of the company. The company was sold to Scottish Malt Distillers, which itself was bought by The Distillers Company.

After temporary closure between 1941 and 1945 as a result of barley shortage during World War II, the distillery reopened in 1945 under Roderick Mackenzie, who led the distillery until 1963. Mackenzie believed that all things in the distillery contributed to the final product. In 1962, Scottish Malt Distillers decided the distillery needed to be completely refurbished. Mackenzie oversaw the rebuilding of the distillery in his last year as general manager. The distillery was electrified, replacing the steam engine and water wheel that powered the distillery before, and all stills were replaced with exact replicas of the former stills.

In 1971 a second distillery was built alongside the first, which became known as Linkwood B, with steam heated stills. The stills of the first distillery were converted to being heated by steam as well. With the build of Linkwood B the two distilleries reached their current combined capacity of 2.5 million litres per year.

The distillery was mothballed between 1985 and 1990 when partial production restarted.

In 2008, Diageo resumed full production with three different official bottlings of Linkwood released.

In 2024, Linkwood's Woven Honor Single Malt Scotch Whisky was released as a part of Diageo's Orphan Barrel Whiskey Co.
