= Glenlossie distillery =

Scottish distillery

Coordinates: 57.5989°N 3.3183°W

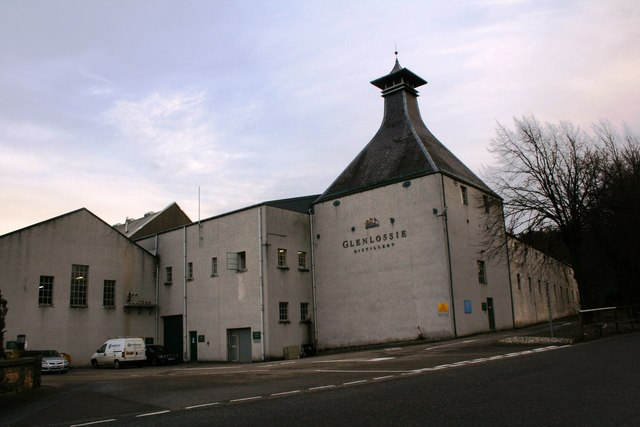
- Location: Elgin, Morayshire
- Owner: Diageo
- Founded: 1876
- Status: Active
- Water source: The Bardon Burn
- No. of stills: 3 wash stills (15,600 liters); 3 spirit stills (13,500 liters)
- Capacity: 1,100,000 litres

Glenlossie distillery is a single malt whisky distillery in Elgin, Morayshire in Scotland.

== History ==
The Glenlossie distillery was founded in 1876, by John Duff.

In 1919, the distillery was bought over by Distillers Company Ltd.

In 1929, the distillery was destroyed by a fire but it was quickly rebuilt. The distillery was closed during the first and second world wars.

In 1962, it increased from 4 to 6 stills.

in 1990, Glenlossie 10 year old was launched.

== See also ==
- Speyside single malt
- Whisky
- Scotch whisky
- List of whisky brands
- List of distilleries in Scotland
