= Roseisle =

Area in the Laich of Moray, Scotland

Coordinates: 57.6872°N 3.4463°W

Roseisle is an area in the west of the Laich of Moray near Elgin, Moray in the parish of Duffus. The area includes the former farms at Oldtown, Easter Backlands of Roseisle, the three farms on the Bank of Roseisle and the clachan of the College of Roseisle.

== Location ==
The College of Roseisle lies at crossroads of the main Burghead to Elgin road and the Lossiemouth to Forres road. The college prefix recalls the former monks college.

Near Roseisle, just over a mile from the College of Roseisle, is Roseisle Distillery, which is owned by Diageo.

In the 19th century various stone cists or coffins were found in the area with human remains and, in some cases, ornaments.

== History ==
A charter was given to William, son of Freskin from King William I of Scotland, of the lands of Roseisle between 1165 and 1171. Roseisle was sold by Alexander Stuart, 5th Earl of Moray to Alexander Sutherland, 1st Lord Duffus in 1653. The estate was purchased by Archibald Dunbar of Northfield, who then sold it to John Gordon, 16th Earl of Sutherland in 1729.

== Local attractions ==
There are various walks in the Roseisle area:

- The Tappoch viewpoint accessed up a track from West Bank Farm.
- Roseisle Forest, extending from Burghead to Kinloss. Also, contains an intact part of the former Hopeman branch railway line.
- Roseisle beach with WW2 pillboxes and tank obstacles, which forms a part of Burghead Bay between Burghead and Findhorn.

== Notable people ==
- Ethel Baxter, member of the Baxters food company, cook and businesswoman.

== See also ==
- List of places in Moray
