= Tullibardine distillery =

Whisky distillery in Scotland, UK

Coordinates: 56°15′28″N 3°47′8″W

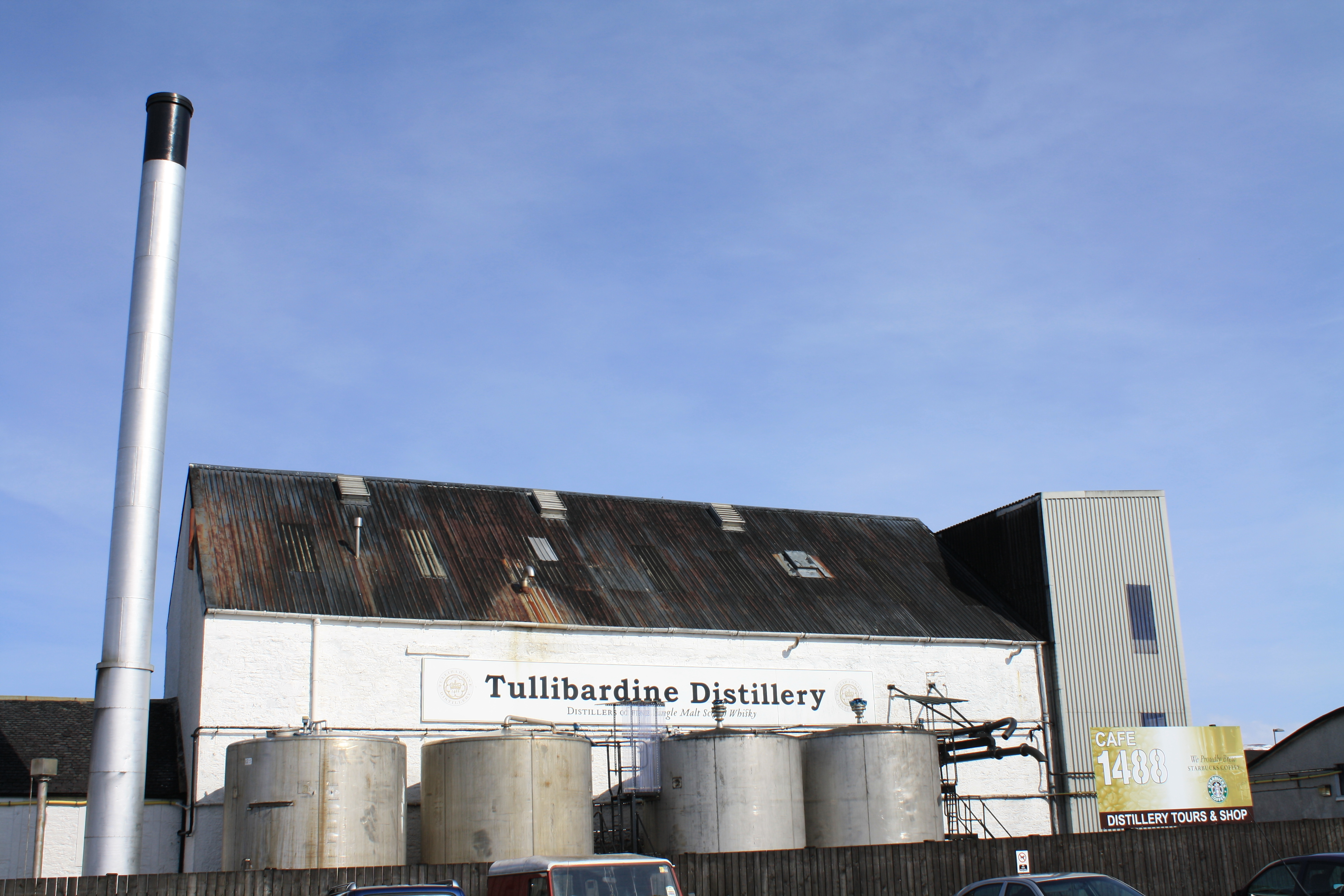
- Location: Blackford, Perthshire
- Owner: Picard Vins & Spiritueux
- Founded: 1949
- Status: Operational
- Water source: Ochil Hills, Danny Burn
- No. of stills: 2 wash stills 2 spirit stills
- Capacity: 2,700,000 litres

Tullibardine Aged Oak Edition
- Type: Single Malt
- Cask type(s): Bourbon
- ABV: 40

Tullibardine Banyuls Finish
- Type: Single Malt
- Cask type(s): Bourbon, Banyuls
- ABV: 40

Tullibardine Sherry Finish
- Type: Single Malt
- Cask type(s): Bourbon, Sherry
- ABV: 40

Tullibardine distillery is a Scottish distillery since 1949, producing a single malt whisky. The whisky distillery is located in Blackford, Perth and Kinross, close to the Ochil Hills and the Danny Burn, their main water sources.

The distillery was mothballed in 1995 by then owner Whyte & Mackay. In 2003, it was sold to Tullibardine Distillery Ltd, who resumed production. In 2011, the distillery was sold to the French firm Picard Vins & Spiritueux. This firm in 2013 created an entity for the spirits named Terroirs Distillers.

The distillery produces several types of single malt whisky, including "Aged Oak Edition Single Malt Whisky" and "Sherry Finish Malt Whisky", and related liqueurs.

Tullibardine Distillery runs a visitor's centre.

== See also ==
- Whisky
- Scotch whisky
- List of whisky brands
