= Isle of Tiree distillery =

Whisky distillery on Tiree, Scotland

Isle of Tiree Distillery

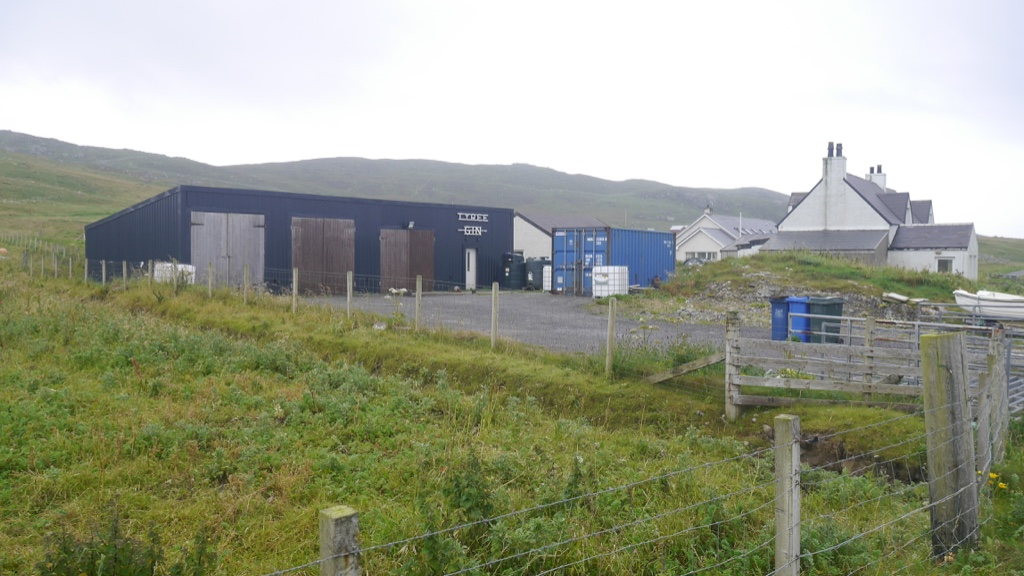

Region: Island
- Location: 1A West Hynish, Isle of Tiree, PA77 6UF, Scotland, United Kingdom
- Coordinates: 56.4539°N 6.9396°W
- Owner: Tiree Whisky Co. Ltd.
- Founded: 2019; 7 years ago
- Founder: Alain Campbell; Ian Smith
- Status: Operational
- No. of stills: 3
- Capacity: 5000 litres
- Website: www.tyreegin.com

Isle of Tiree distillery is a single malt whisky and gin distillery in West Hynish, Tiree, in the Inner Hebrides of Scotland.

The distillery opened in 2019, and the first whisky from the distillery was released in 2025.

== History ==
The Tiree Whisky Company was founded in 2012 by Alain Campbell and Ian Smith. The two were musicians in a Scottish folk band, Trail West. The purpose of the project was to provide stable employment to the founders outwith the band, and to raise the profile of the island.

The distillery was constructed in a shed owned by Smith's father, and the first run of spirit was in 2019. The remoteness of the site initially caused issues; the stills had to be adapted to work without three-phase electrical power, and the water was some of the hardest in the UK, necessitating the installation of extra filters.

The stills are direct-fired and a former sherry barrel is used for the mash tun. Fermentation is in a combination of sherry barrels and stainless steel fermenters.

The company claims that Tiree was the first legal distillery on the island since 1801.

== Products ==
The first product distilled at Isle of Tiree was a gin, Tiree Gin. At first, the gin was contract-distilled in London using Tiree kelp, and was released at the 2017 Tiree Music Festival. Once the distillery was built, production of the gin moved to the island, and the first batch of island-distilled gin was released in May 2019.

Isle of Tiree released their first single malt whisky in January 2025, which was matured in four casks: virgin oak, Heaven Hill bourbon cask, and two oloroso sherry casks. 800 bottles were made, with the first 10 bottles being auctioned in support of charities on Tiree. The distillery also produces corn whisky and rye whisky.
