= Borders distillery =

The Borders distillery

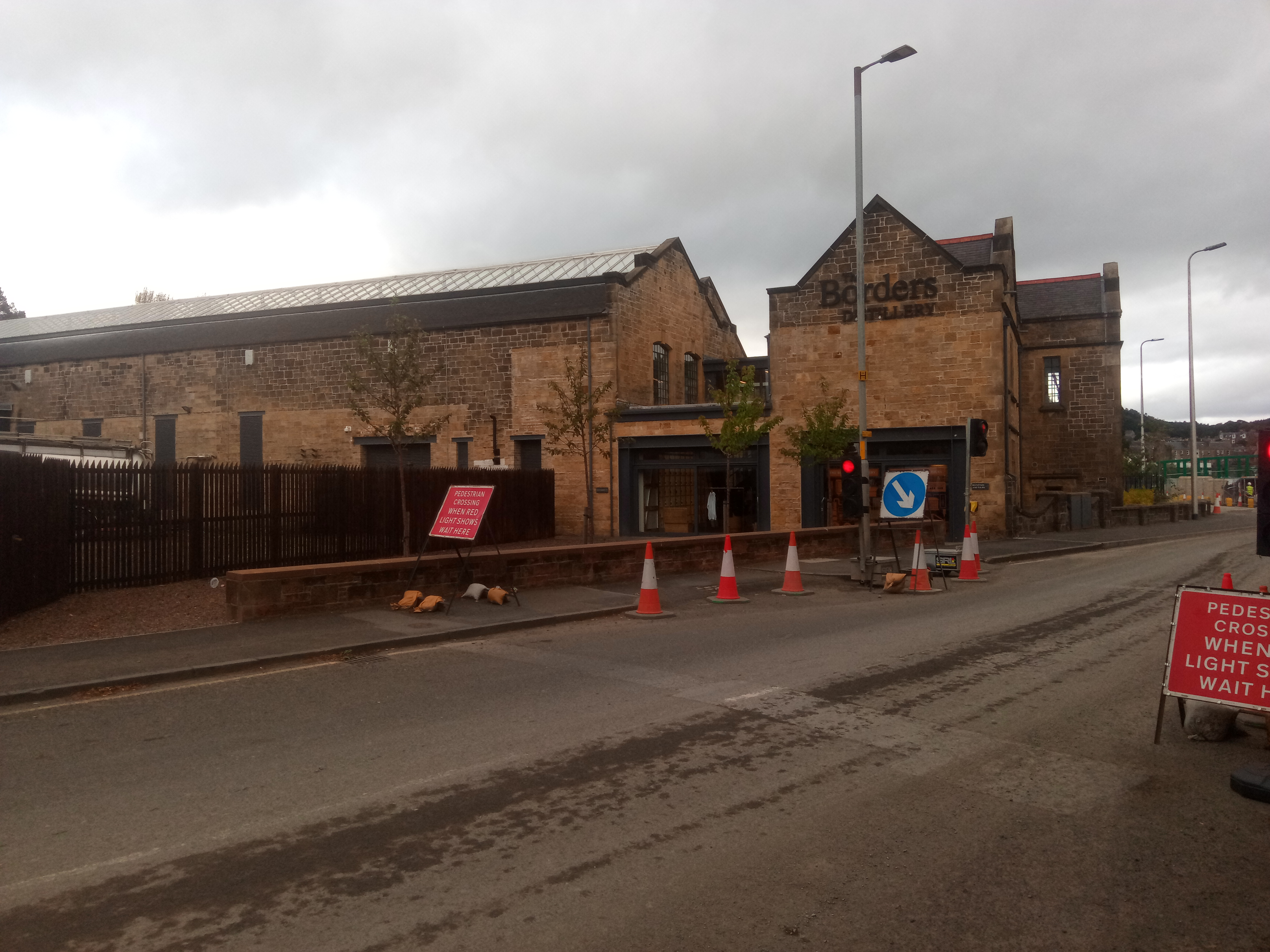
- Location: Hawick, Scottish Borders, Scotland
- Coordinates: 55.42452°N 2.78887°W
- Founded: 2018
- Founder: George Tait; Tony Roberts; Tim Carton; John Fordyce
- Status: Active
- Water source: River Teviot
- No. of stills: 2 wash stills 2 spirit stills
- Capacity: 2,000,000 L
- Website: www.thebordersdistillery.com

The Borders distillery, is a malt whisky, gin and vodka production facility in the Scottish Borders town of Hawick. The distillery produces malt whisky, William Kerrs Gin. and vodka and has a visitor centre on Commercial Road.

== History ==
The Borders distillery is the first Scotch Whisky distillery in the Scottish Borders since 1837, becoming operational in March 2018 and opening to the public on 1 May 2018. The distillery is in a landmark building in the centre of town, having previously been the site of the Hawick Electric Company and several engineering businesses. The distillery takes the form of two large sheds, dating from the 1880s joined by a modern glass extension to a Tudor Cotswold building.

== Products ==
The hosts two wash stills, two spirit stills and a specially commissioned Carter Head still, made by Forsyths of Rothes. Whilst the malt whisky is maturing, management have developed a more traditional blend under the “Clan Fraser” and "Clan Fraser Reserve" brands, together with an edgier blended malt under the “Lower East Side” brand. In 2022, The Borders Distillery released "WS:01 Borders Malt & Rye". This is the first blend to leave the Scottish Borders region in 185 years.

The barley sourced for the distillery is entirely grown in the Borders and operating at full capacity the distillery will produce up to 1.6 million litres of pure alcohol.

William Kerr's Borders Gin, is made using the Borders Distillery's own malted spirit, which is mashed and fermented on site with the gin distilled in a bespoke Carter Head still, a specially modified column still. The gin itself is named for William Kerr (1779-1814) was a native of Hawick and became a gardener at the Royal Botanical Gardens, Kew, London
