= Ben Rinnes =

Mountain in Moray, northern Scotland

- Beinn Ruaidhneis
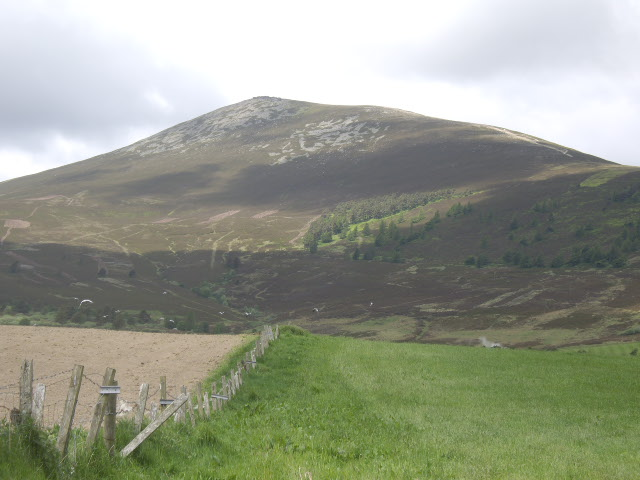
- View of Ben Rinnes from the south-east

Highest point
- Elevation: 841 m (2,759 ft)
- Prominence: 512 m (1,680 ft)
- Listing: Corbett, Marilyn
- Coordinates: 57°24′12″N 3°14′29″W

Naming
- English translation: Promontory hill
- Language of name: Gaelic
- Pronunciation: Scottish Gaelic: [peɲ ˈɾɤiɲɛʃ]

Geography
- Location within Scotland
- Location: Moray, Scotland
- Parent range: Grampian Mountains
- OS grid: NJ255354
- Topo map: Ordnance Survey Landranger 28

Ben Rinnes (Scottish Gaelic: Beinn Ruaidhneis) is a mountain in Moray, in northern Scotland. The mountain is popular with hikers. The mountain is 20 km^{2} in total and is located 8 km southwest of Dufftown. The mountain has one main path and can be easily accessed from the nearby car park. The Friends of Ben Rinnes program has been working on the paths to make it more accessible to the public and to prevent further erosion of the fragile ecosystem on the steep slopes and has been rather successful.

== View aspects ==
From the summit it is possible to see 8 counties (Aberdeenshire, Banffshire, Moray, Nairnshire, Inverness-shire, Ross and Cromarty, Sutherland, and Caithness) and on a clear day even the Moray coast. Another draw for the hiker are the waterfalls from the many rivers that flow down the mountain such as Linn of Ruthrie.

== Ben Rinnes hill race ==
A hill race has been held on Ben Rinnes for a number of years, as part of the Dufftown Highland Games. This race begins at the games field, goes over the neighbouring hills of Little Conval and Meikle Conval, then up to the summit of Ben Rinnes. Runners return by the same route. The race is 22 km long, with over 1500 m of ascent. The current records are 1:53:47 by Eoin Lennon and 2:18:12 by Jill Stephen, both set in 2018.
