= Strathdee distillery =

- Location: Aberdeen, Scotland
- Owner: Strathdee Distillery Co
- Founded: 1821
- Status: Closed/demolished
- Water source: Manofield Burn
- No. of stills: 1 wash, 1 spirit

Strathdee distillery was a Highland single malt Scotch whisky distillery in Aberdeen, Scotland.

== History ==
Strathdee distillery was situated on Balmoral Road, in the valley of the Dee. was built in 1821 by Mr. Henry Ogg. the distillery out-put was from about 15,000 to 25,000 gallons.

In 1895 was acquired by David Walker who ran until 1915 when it became incorporated as Strathdee Distillery Co.

In 1920 was bought by Robertson & Co that was merged with Train & McIntyre in 1925. National Distillers of America then bought Train & McIntyre.

The distillery was mothballed it during WW II. Last distillation is believed to have occurred in 1942 and then was closed. It is now demolished.
