= 8 Doors distillery =

Whisky distillery in John O'Groats, Scotland

8 Doors Distillery

Region: Highland
- Location: John O'Groats, Wick KW1 4YR, Scotland, United Kingdom
- Coordinates: 58.642703°N 3.0695149°W
- Founded: 2 August 2023; 3 years ago
- Founder: Kerry Campbell; Derek Campbell
- Architect: NorCad Design
- Water source: Borehole
- No. of stills: 2; 1700 litre wash still 1300 litre spirit still
- Capacity: 150,000 litres

8 Doors Distillery is a single malt Scotch whisky distillery in John O'Groats, Caithness. The distillery was founded in 2022. It is the most northerly Scotch whisky distillery on the Scottish mainland.

The distillery was formally opened by Charles III during his first official engagement to Caithness as monarch. There is a visitor centre that operates public tours of the site.

== Name ==
The name and concept behind the distillery was derived from local folklore about Jan de Groot, the 15th century ferryman who gave his name to the settlement of John O'Groats. Groot had seven male heirs who would quarrel over succession. In order to placate his sons, he built a house in the shape of an octagon, with eight doors and eight seats at the table, so no person could be seen as more important than the rest.

== History ==
The distillery was founded by married couple Kerry and Derek Campbell, both local to Caithness. The project received £198,000 in funding from Highlands and Islands Enterprise. Planning permission was granted in March 2020. The first run of spirit took place in 2022.

The distillery was officially opened on 2 August 2023 by King Charles III. During his visit, the king filled a Pedro Ximinez sherry cask and sampled the new make. The visit was the King's first official engagement in Caithness since his coronation.

There are several tour options for visitors, some of which cannot be pre-booked and are for walk-ins only. In 2024, the distillery offered free of charge admission for that year's Doors Open Days festival.

The distillery has made much of its location near the northernmost point of the Scottish mainland. It is the most northerly Scotch whisky distillery, excluding those on the islands. Since 2020, it has operated a membership club - the 874 Club - named after the 874 mile distance between John O' Groats and Land's End, the longest overland route in Great Britain.

== Reception & awards ==
In 2023, the distillery was named "Tourism Destination of the Year" at the Scottish Whisky Awards.

Five Ways liqueur was awarded "Artisinal Product of the Year" at the Scotland Food & Drink Excellence Awards 2024.
