= Coleburn distillery =

Scotch single malt whisky distillery

Coordinates: 57°35′56.65″N 3°16′39.22″W

Coleburn Distillery
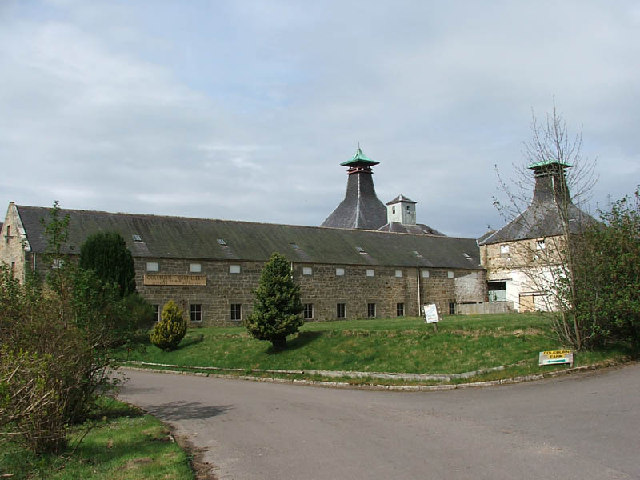
- Location: Longmorn, Elgin, Scotland
- Owner: Winchester Brothers (site); Coleburn Distillery Ltd (brand)
- Founded: 1897
- Founder: John Robertson & Son Ltd.
- Status: Mothballed
- Mothballed: 1985

Coleburn Distillery is a recently reinstated Speyside single malt Scotch whisky distillery in Longmorn, Elgin in Scotland.

== History ==
The distillery was founded in 1897 by John Robertson & Son.

In 1915 was sold to the Clynelish Distillery Company, which John Risk owned, John Walker & Sons and DCL.

In 1985, Coleburn distillery was mothballed.

in 1986, DCL. was acquired by Guinness and was renamed as United Distillers in 1987.

In 1997, Guinness merged with Grand Metropolitan to create Diageo wish become the owner of Coleburn distillery.

In 2004, the distillery buildings were sold to the D&M Winchester with plans to transform the distillery grounds into a whisky resort.

In 2014, Coleburn’s dunnage warehouses were leased to Aceo, owner of an independent bottler Murray McDavid that also has plans to restart whisky production on the site.

In 2024, D&M Winchester announced that the Coleburn Distillery bistro will open later in the year with plans for the distillery restart producing whisky in the future.

In August 2025, D&M Winchester announced that the Coleburn Distillery will reopen in 2027, with master distiller Keith Cruickshank and Organic Architects leading the project. Coleburn is now being reinstated as a fully operational site, complete with a new distillery and visitor bistro in the first phase of development. The distillery will be known as ‘The Distillery at Coleburn’.

Coleburn will combine heritage and innovation, respecting its traditional DNA while adopting modern techniques and sustainable practices, with plans for a two-tonne mash tun and initial production of around 100,000 litres of alcohol annually.

The project is focused on community, culture, and tourism, creating jobs, preserving Speyside’s whisky heritage, and offering visitors not just whisky, but a story, a setting, and a sense of place that brings new life to one of Speyside’s hidden gems.
