= Tormore distillery =

Distillery in Scotland

Coordinates: 57°23′51.0″N 3°24′31.8″W

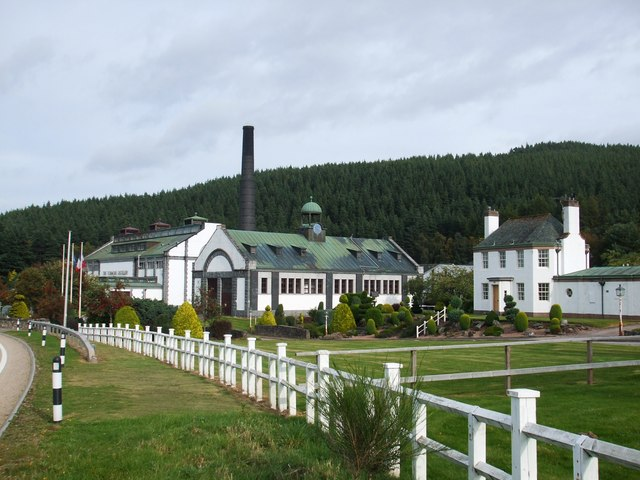

Region: Speyside
- Owner: Elixir Distillers
- Founded: 1958
- Status: Active
- Water source: Allt an Torra Mhoir Burn
- No. of stills: 4 wash stills 4 spirit stills
- Capacity: 3,700,000 litres

Tormore distillery is a Speyside single malt Scotch whisky distillery located approximately 1 km south of the River Spey. Its water source is the Allt an Torra Mhoir Burn.

It is currently not open to the public

== History ==
The Tormore distillery construction began in 1958 and was completed in 1960.

Designed by Alexander Cullen with input from Sir Albert Richardson for Long John International, it is a listed building, and one of the most architecturally striking distilleries. The building is made of granite, has copper rotors and a clock which plays four different Scottish songs each quarter of an hour. A village of workers houses were built in the same style, which was up for sale in its entirety in 2004, for offers over £550,000. The topiary hedges in the garden are also clipped to the shape of a bell or still.

In 1972, the distillery was expanded from four to eight stills. These were converted to be heated by wood chips in 1984, a by-product of area's forestry. Long John was absorbed by Whitbread & Co in 1975, and the distillery was acquired by Allied Distillers Ltd the same year. The Tormore distillery has been controlled by Pernod-Ricard since they purchased Allied Domecq in 2005 and until it was sold to Elixir Distillers in 2022.

A time capsule in the shape of a pot-still is buried in the forecourt, which is intended to be opened in 2060. It contains glasses and a tregnum of Long John, the original owners’ own blended whisky.

== Bottlings ==
Tormore's malt whisky is currently sold in 14 and 16 year aged versions. There are also independent bottlings from Signatory Vintage, Cadenhead's, Blackadder, That Boutique-y Whisky Company, Douglas Laing's Xtra Old Particular and Provenance. The whisky is described as "A smooth, nutty whisky which sometimes has a pear-like or melony character" by Royal Mile Whiskies.

== See also ==
- Whisky
- Scotch whisky
- List of whisky brands
- List of distilleries in Scotland
