= Bonnington distillery =

Whisky maker in Leith, Edinburgh, Scotland

Coordinates: 55.9726°N 3.1851°W

Region: Lowland
- Location: Leith, Edinburgh, Scotland
- Owner: Halewood Artisanal Spirits
- Founded: 2019
- Status: Active
- Water source: Local aquifer
- No. of stills: 1 wash 1 spirit
- Capacity: 500,000 L
- Website: crabbiewhisky.com

Map
- Bonnington (Edinburgh)

Bonnington distillery is a Lowland single malt Scotch whisky distillery located in Leith, Edinburgh, Scotland, owned by Halewood Artisanal Spirits.

== History ==
The Bonnington distillery project began in 2017 on Graham Street, close to the original John Crabbie premises. Construction commenced in 2018, during which the ruins of historic Bonnington House, once a military headquarters during the siege of Edinburgh Castle, were uncovered and documented by archaeologists. The site was chosen to retain the same postcode (EH6) as the original Crabbie building.

The distillery was commissioned in 2019 and began production in March 2020. The initial set‑up included a two‑tonne mash tun, six 10,000‑litre washbacks, and two stills, later expanded in 2023 with nine additional washbacks to enable a 24‑hour, five‑day production cycle.

In January 2024, Bonnington launched its first single malt expression — the Bonnington Inaugural Release Single Malt — a single cask Lowland whisky aged in ruby Port casks. Only 500 bottles were produced, each hand‑signed by distillery manager Jamie Lockhart. Bottled at 52.3% ABV, it was described as having notes of dessert wine, dried pears, citrus, and rich oak.

In May 2024, the distillery unveiled a limited Sherry Cask Release Single Malt, fully matured in Pedro Ximénez sherry casks. Just 250 cases were made, with tasting notes of sweet sugar, fresh oak, red fruit, and a tannic, slightly salty finish.

In August 2025, Bonnington’s new range included a 47% ABV non‑peated spirit and a 51% ABV peated spirit, both matured in Muscat casks.

== Production ==
The distillery produces whisky entirely on site, from mashing to maturation, using copper pot stills and a variety of cask types including ruby Port, Pedro Ximénez sherry, and Muscat. Malted barley is sourced from Pencaitland and Alloa, with casks filled on site and sent to warehouses in Kirkcaldy before returning to Edinburgh for bottling.

== Chain Pier distillery ==
Chain Pier was a pilot distillery in Granton which was operated whilst construction of Bonnington was delayed due to the archeological dig on the remains of Bonnington House. The pilot distillery operated for a single year, between 2018 and 2019, and filled only 39 casks. The site operated one 500 litre pot still..

An inaugural bottling of Chain Pier single malt was released in 2022. This was promoted as the first single malt to be distilled within the boundaries of the City of Edinburgh in over a century.
