= Invergordon distillery =

Scotch whisky grain distillery

Coordinates: 57°41′48″N 4°9′28″W

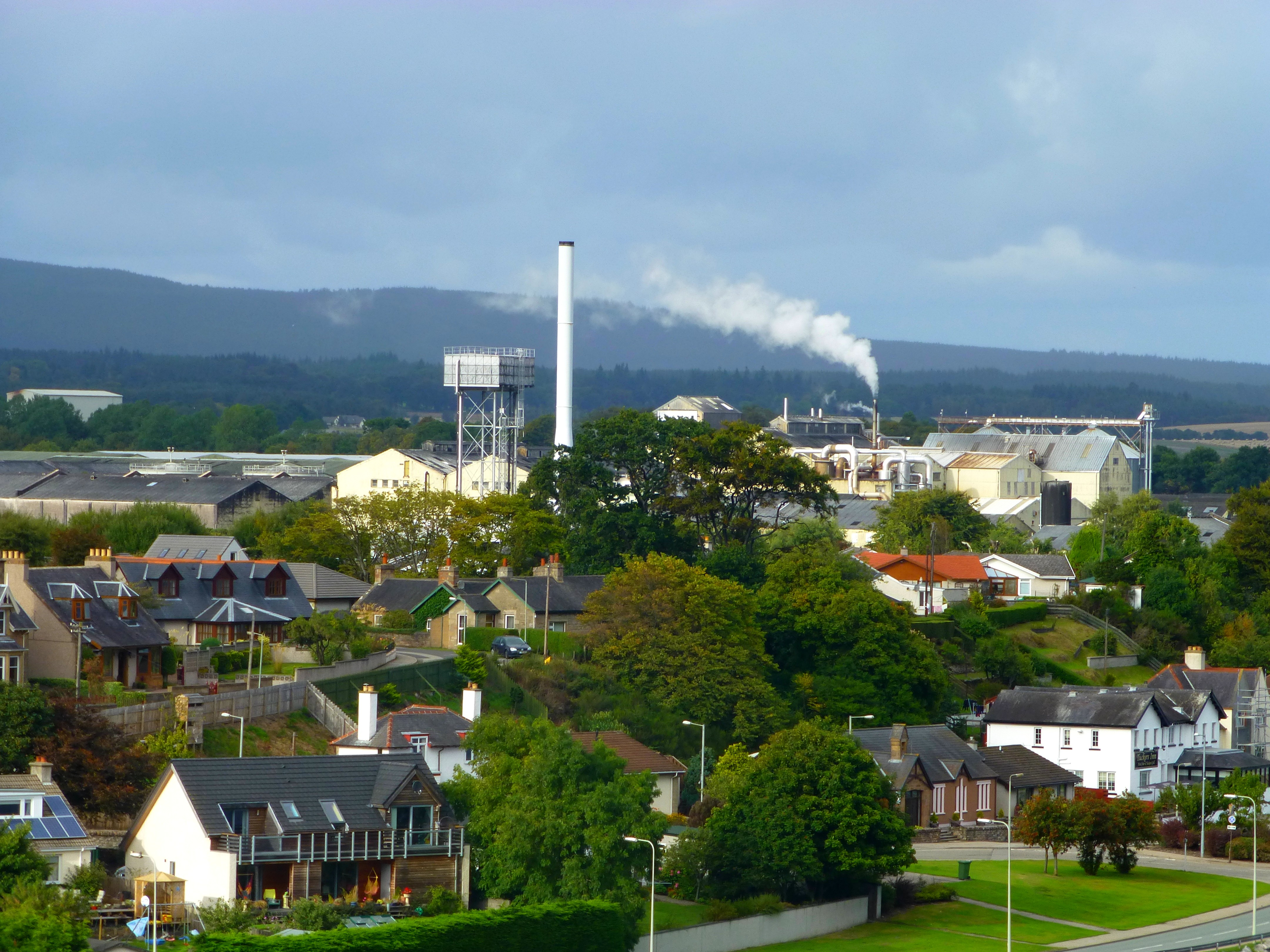
- Location: Easter Ross
- Owner: Whyte & Mackay
- Founded: 1959
- Water source: Loch Glass
- No. of stills: 3 coffey stills
- Capacity: 36,000,000 L

Invergordon distillery is a grain whisky distillery located at Invergordon in Easter Ross, in Ross and Cromarty, Highland, Scotland.

The distillery is operated by Whyte & Mackay, which Philippines-based Alliance Global owns.

It was established in 1959. The distillery started operations in 1961. Along with Tamnavulin distillery in Speyside it provides whisky for the company's blended Scotch whisky brands.

In July 2023, Whyte & Mackay announced the expansion of its whisky maturation complex at Invergordon, doubling its footprint from 45.4 hectares to 92 hectares.

== See also ==
- Invergordon Distillery Pipe Band
- List of distilleries in Scotland
- List of whisky brands
