= Banff distillery =

Whisky distillery in Scotland

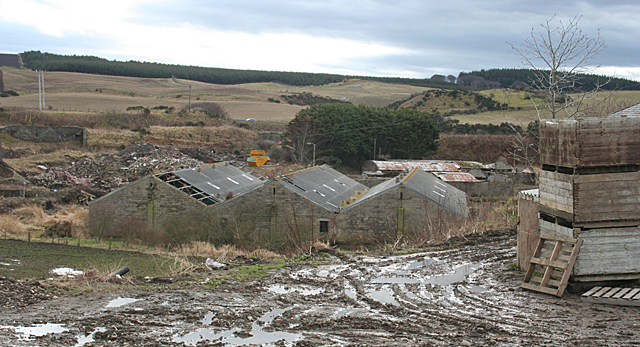
- Site of former Banff distillery

Region: Speyside
- Location: Banff, Aberdeenshire, Scotland
- Coordinates: 57°40′2″N 2°33′34″W
- Owner: James Simpson family (1863–1921) Mile End Distillery Company (1921–1932); The Distillers Company (1932–1986); United Distillers (1986-1997) Diageo (1997- )
- Founded: 1863
- Status: Closed/demolished
- Water source: Springs on Fiskaidly farm
- Demolished: 1991

Banff distillery was Speyside single malt Scotch whisky distillery in Banff, Aberdeenshire, Scotland.

== History ==
The first distillery to use the name "Banff" was built by James McKilligan & Co. in 1824 on Banff Bay in Inverboyndie. In 1837, ownership was transferred to Alex Mackay, and then, in 1852, to James Simpson Sr. and James Simpson Jr. In 1863, James Simpson Jr. built a new distillery, also in Inverboyndie. This distillery had better access to rail transport (via the Great North of Scotland Railway) and a better water source in the springs on Fiskaidly farm.

Although the Banff distillery had dealt with fires and explosions in the past, a particularly bad fire damaged or destroyed much of the distillery apart from the warehouse on 9 May 1877. By October of the same year, Simpson had rebuilt the distillery and restored operation. He also then kept a fire engine on the premises. In 1921, Simpson's family sold a portion of the distillery to the London-based Mile End Distillery Company. In 1932, a subsidiary of Distillers Company Ltd. bought the entire distillery for £50,000, and stopped production immediately.

On 16 August 1941, a Nazi Junkers Ju 88 attacked the Banff distillery and destroyed warehouse No. 12. Many whisky casks burned and a great deal of stock was lost. Farmers reported that the whisky had run into nearby water supplies and intoxicated the local animal population. Repair on the distillery started in the winter of 1941. In 1943, No. 248 Squadron RAF was moved to the site of the distillery and remained there until the end of the war.

After World War II ended, renovation on the Banff distillery began with the intent of restoring it to operation. While one of the stills was being repaired by a coppersmith on 3 October 1959, vapors inside were ignited and caused an explosion that destroyed the still and damaged part of the distillery. The distillery's parent company was fined £15 for having violated safety regulations.

When renovation was finally complete, the distillery returned to operating status and continued to produce whisky until it was finally mothballed in 1983. By the late 1980s, most of the distillery's buildings had been dismantled or demolished. The last warehouse was destroyed in a fire on 11 April 1991.

== Operation ==
The stills at Banff were fed by hand with coal until 1963, when a system was put in place to deliver the coal mechanically. In 1970, the stills were converted to be heated by oil burners. Cooling water was drawn from Burn of Boydine.

Banff used a triple-distillation process until 1924.
