= Aberargie distillery =

Scotch whisky distillery in Perthshire, Scotland

Aberargie Distillery
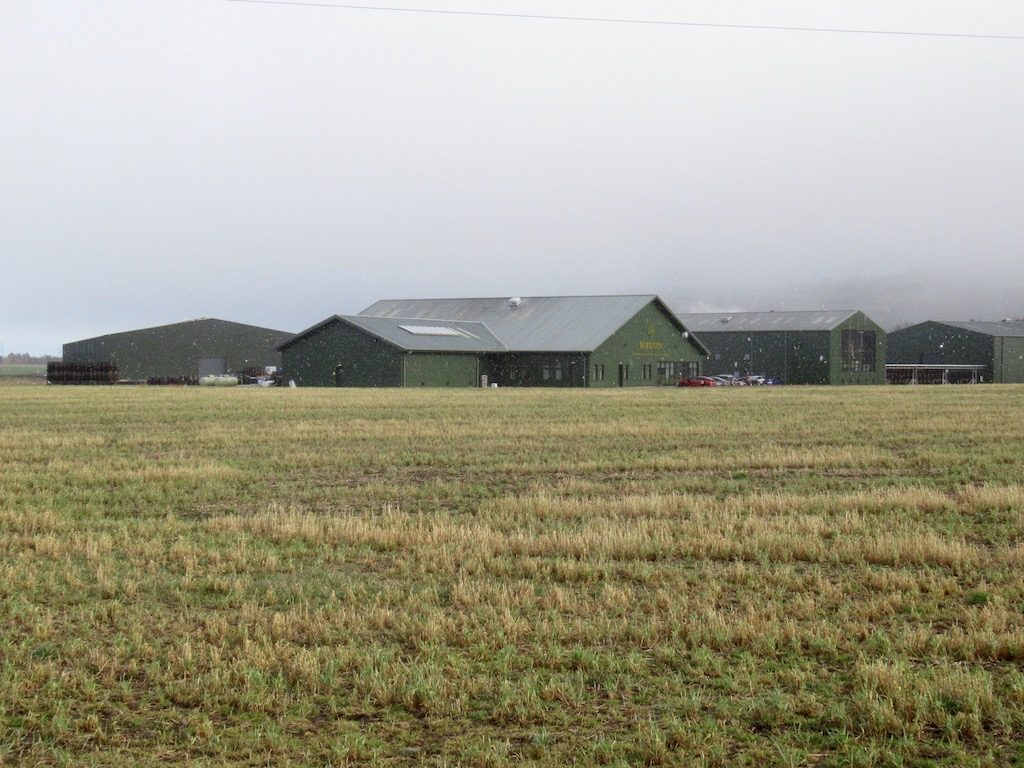
- Location: Kincardine House Reed Road Aberargie PH2 9LX, Scotland, United Kingdom
- Coordinates: 56.3290°N 3.3491°W
- Owner: Morrison Scotch Whisky Distillers
- Founded: 2017; 9 years ago
- Status: Operational
- No. of stills: 2; 1 x 15,000 litre wash still 1 x 10,000 litre spirit still
- Capacity: 750,000 litres
- Website: aberargie.com

Aberargie distillery is a single malt whisky distillery in Perth and Kinross, Scotland. The operators are the Morrison family, who previously owned Morrison Bowmore Distillers Ltd.

The distillery is located on a 300-acre farm, where they grow their own heritage barley for whisky production.

== History ==
Aberargie distillery was founded by the Morrison family in 2017. The family had been involved in the whisky business for more than 5 generations, and had at various times owned Auchentoshan, Glen Garioch, and Bowmore distillery distilleries through their company, Morrison Bowmore Distillers Ltd. After Morrison Bowmore was sold to Suntory Global Spirits in 1994, the family ceased to be directly involved in distilling for 23 years.

The distillery is located on a 300-acre farm, where Golden Promise barley is grown for whisky production. The heritage strain was chosen for flavour and consistency. The distillery only uses its own barley, and distillation, bottling and maturation are all done on site.

The first run of whisky was in 2017, and the inaugural single malt whisky is scheduled for release in March 2026. Poet Miriam Gamble was commissioned to create a work commemorating the release.

The distillery operates 12 beehives on site. For World Bee Day 2025, three cocktail bars in the Central Belt ran a cocktail menu using the distillery's honey and the company's Bruadar liqueur.
