= Dunphail distillery =

Whisky distillery in Forres, Scotland

Dunphail Distillery
- Location: Wester Greens, Dunphail, Forres, Moray IV36 2QR, Scotland, United Kingdom
- Coordinates: 57.5242°N 3.6098°W
- Owner: Dunphail Distillery Ltd.
- Founded: 6 October 2023; 2 years ago
- Founder: Dariusz Plazewski; Ewelina Chruszczyk
- Status: Operational
- Water source: Borehole
- No. of stills: 3; 2 2250 litre wash stills 1 2250 litre spirit still
- Capacity: 200,000 litres
- Website: www.dunphaildistillery.com

Dunphail Distillery is a single malt Scotch whisky distillery in Dunphail, Forres, Moray, built within a set of converted former farm buildings.

Production at the site is done on traditional equipment, including direct-fired stills and wooden washbacks. All of the barley used on site is floor-malted at the distillery.

== History ==
Planning permission was sought in 2021 to convert the existing Wester Green Steading into a distillery with cask storage and a floor maltings. The site was previously used as barns for livestock, and the current distillery retains some of the original stonework. The distillery aimed to be the second distillery in Scotland to floor malt 100% of the barley it used onsite, the other being Springbank.

Production began at the site in October 2023. Upon opening, the distillery employed five people. As of 2025, the distillery was only producing 100,000 litres of spirit per year, half of its stated capacity.

== Key people ==
The distillery was co-founded by partners Dariusz Plazewski and Ewelina Chruszczyk. They had emigrated from Poland to the UK in 2003, and previously founded the English whisky distillery Bimber in North Acton, London in 2015.

Plazewski described himself as a "third-generation moonshiner", having been taught to distill by his Polish father and grandfather, and previously worked as an architect. Chruszczyk was an interior designer and bespoke furniture-maker prior to co-founding the distillery. In 2022, Matt McKay joined Dunphail as Director of Whisky Creation and Outreach, with Plazewski as master distillery.

In February 2024, Plazewski was arrested at his London home. He was found to have been living in the UK under an assumed identity and faced extradition to Poland. Following his arrest, he relinquished control of Dunphail distillery to McKay and Chruszczyz. McKay left the company in December 2024.

== Production ==
The production site at Dunphail was designed to go beyond what was possible at Bimber distillery due to space limitations at the London site; for example, unlike at Bimber, Dunphail floor-malt at the distillery itself. The floor maltings at Dunphail was the first to be built at a Speyside distillery since 1898. The barley is hand-turned twice a day, and the distillery has a working pagoda for ventilation.

Dunphail make both peated and unpeated spirit. There are 12 Douglas fir washbacks and the fermentation is 144 hours. There are three stills; two wash stills and one spirit still. All three stills are 2250 litres and direct-fired.

The new make spirit is textural, rich and fruity. Maturation is predominately in 250 litre refill hogsheads, sherry casks, and both ruby and tawny port casks.
