= Towiemore distillery =

Scotch whisky distillery

- Location: Botriphnie, Scotland
- Owner: Peter Dawson
- Founded: 1896
- Status: Closed/demolished
- No. of stills: 1 wash, 1 spirit

Towiemore distillery was a Highland single malt Scotch whisky distillery in Botriphnie, Scotland.

== History ==
Towiemore distillery was built in 1896 by the distiller and blender Peter Dawson in Botriphnie, Scotland. The distillery closed during World War I. It reopened after the ending of the war, but never recuperated the former quality of the whisky, since it was cloudy. By 1930 Towiemore was closed.

In 2016, the Lost Distillery Company released a blended malt called Towiemore using historical information to try to replicate the former whisky.
