= Glendullan distillery =

Whisky distillery in Moray, Scotland, UK

Coordinates: 57°26′53″N 03°07′07″W

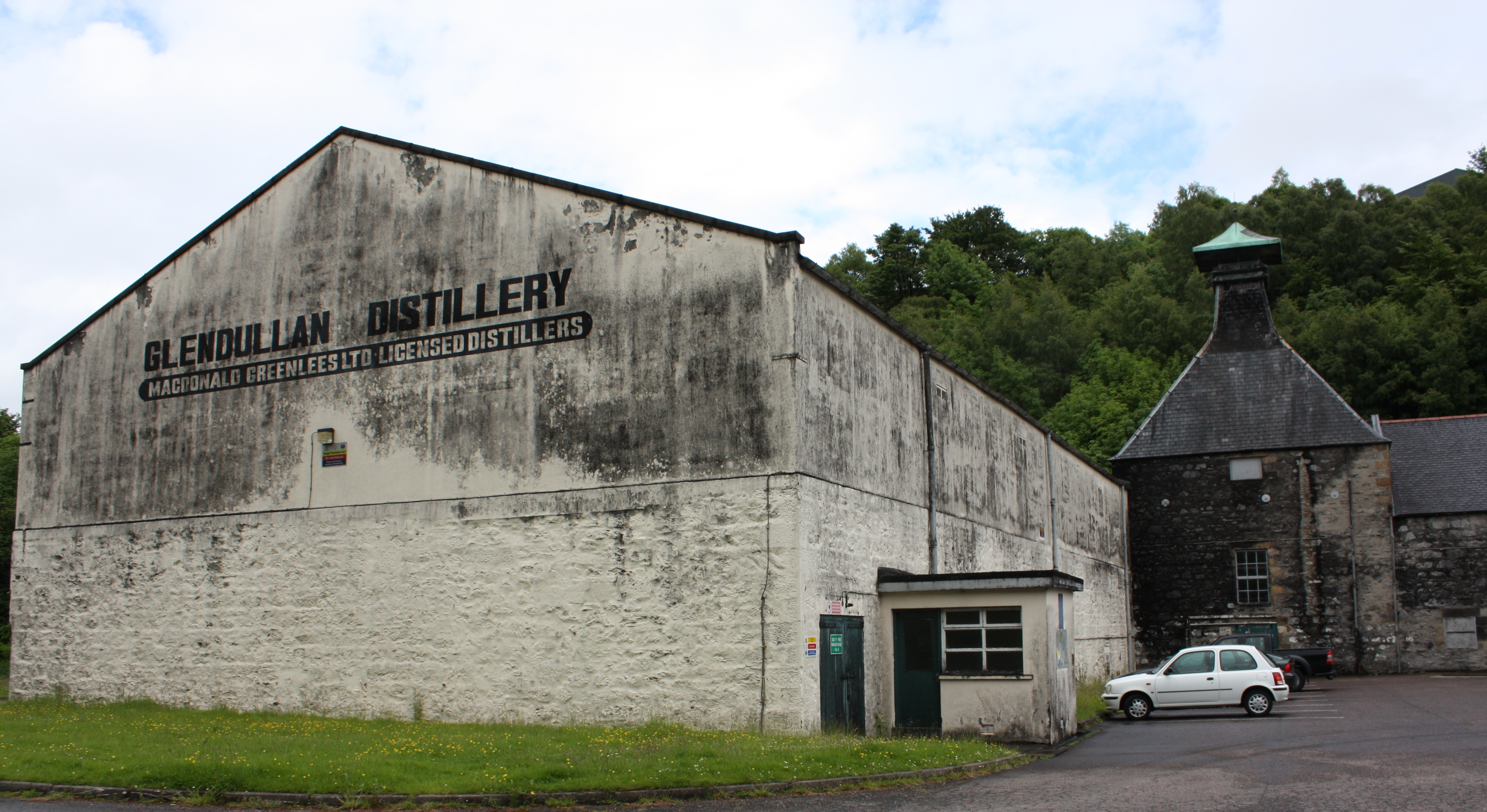

Region: Speyside
- Location: Dufftown
- Owner: Diageo
- Founded: 1897
- Status: Operational
- Water source: Goats Well Spring
- No. of stills: 3 wash stills 3 spirit stills
- Capacity: 3,700,000 L

Glendullan
- Age(s): Twelve years, Rare and Fine Malts- Twenty-Three Years Distilled in 1974

Glendullan distillery is a single malt Scotch whisky distillery in Dufftown, Scotland in the Speyside region. Glendullan is owned by Diageo.

== History ==
Glendullan distillery was built in 1897 by the Aberdeen blender and broker William Williams.

In 1925.Williams merged with Greenlees Brothers and was absorbed within The Distillers Company.

In 1972, a second distillery was built next door run in tandem with the original site until the original plant was closed in 1985.

In 1997, with the merger of Guinness plc (The Distillers Company owner) and Grand Metropolitan, Glendullan distillery become part of the new company, Diageo.

== Production ==
Glendullan distillery's water source is Conval Hill springs. There are three wash stills and three spirit stills.

The output of Glendullan is mostly used within the world of Diageo blended whisky. However there have been a few official releases over the years. A 12 year old as part of the Flora and Fauna range that is now discontinued. The 2023 Singleton series from Diageo though contains a 12, 15 and 18 year old Glendullan.
