= Ballindalloch =

Village in Moray, Scotland

Coordinates: 57°24′44″N 3°22′6″W

Ballindalloch (Scottish Gaelic: Baile na Dalach) is a small village on the River Spey in Scotland.

It is known for its whisky distilleries and for Ballindalloch Castle.

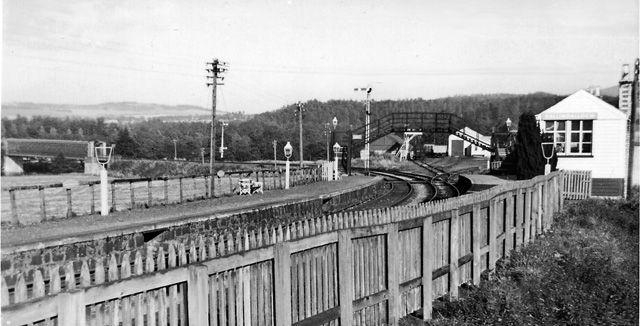
Until 1965 there was a station on the Great North of Scotland Railway

This village is hailed as Scotland's first single estate distillery. There are two distilleries, Cragganmore distillery and Ballindalloch distillery. On the western edge of Ballindalloch is the Tormore distillery.

Ballindalloch previously had a railway station, Ballindalloch railway station that opened on 1 July 1863 and was part of the Strathspey Railway (GNoSR), was functional for around a 100 years but it closed on 18 October 1965.

The name Ballindalloch is also used at Balfron, Stirlingshire for the Ballindalloch Old House, estate, bridge, muir and cotton mill.

== See also ==
- Glenfarclas Single Malt
- Tomintoul
