= Whyte & Mackay =

Scottish alcoholic beverage company

Whyte & Mackay Ltd
- Industry: Drink industry
- Founded: 1844
- Headquarters: Glasgow, Scotland
- Key people: Andrew Lim Tan (Chairman)
- Products: Scotch whiskies, liqueurs, brandies, gins, sherries.
- Owner: Alliance Global Group
- Number of employees: 500
- Website: whyteandmackayltd.com

Whyte & Mackay
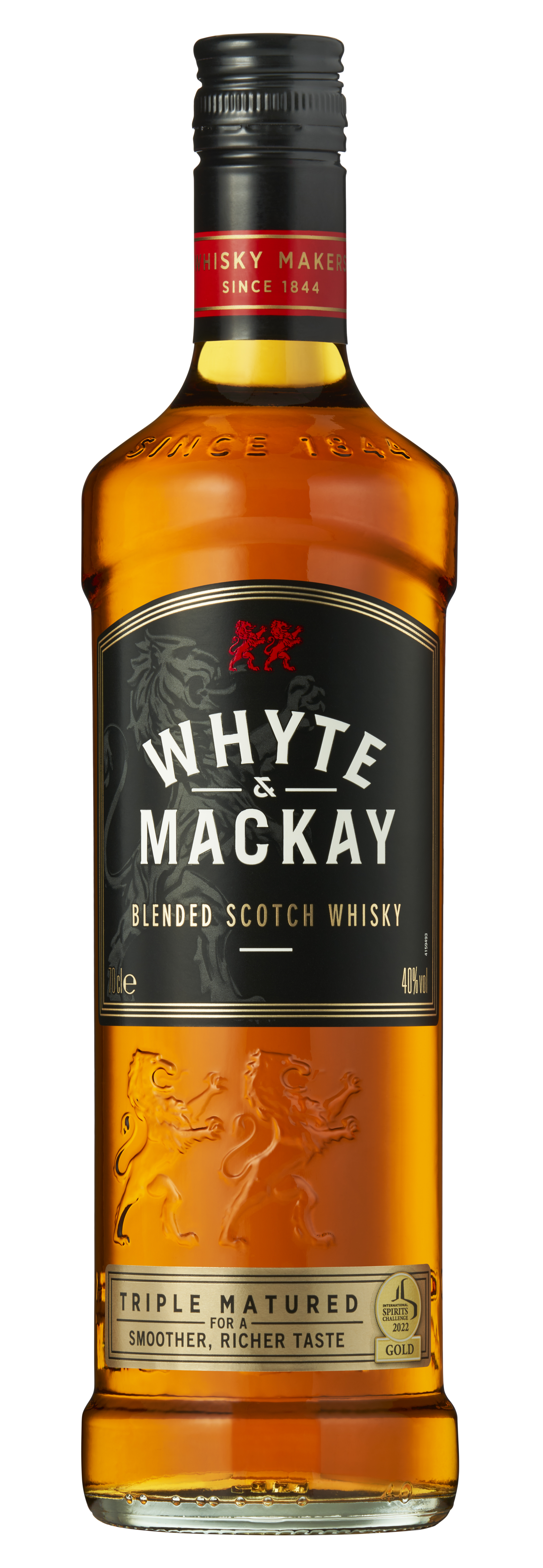
- Whyte & Mackay Blended Scotch whisky
- Type: Scotch whisky
- Manufacturer: Whyte & Mackay
- Origin: Scotland
- Introduced: 1894
- Alcohol by volume: 40%
- Website: www.whyteandmackay.co.uk

Whyte & Mackay Ltd is a company producing alcoholic beverages based in Glasgow, Scotland. The company is a subsidiary of Alliance Global Group, one of the largest alcoholic-beverage companies in Southeast Asia.

== History ==
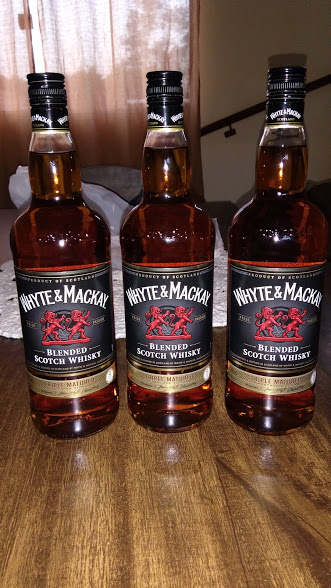
Whyte and Mackay bottles

Charles Mackay (1850–1919) and James Whyte founded a company as whisky merchants and bonded warehousemen in Glasgow in 1882. W&M Special was their first blended whisky and it was successful in the United Kingdom and other English speaking countries. After World War II the company focused on the home market and now sell more than 1 million cases a year.

The Company was purchased by Hugh Fraser's SUITS group in 1971. SUITS was acquired by Lonrho in 1981 and subsequently Whyte & Mackay was sold to Brent Walker in 1988 and then to American Brands in 1990, which was renamed as Fortune Brands in 1997.

In 2001 Fortune Brands sold Whyte & Mackay to its management for £208 million in a deal part-financed by brothers Robert Tchenguiz and Vincent Tchenguiz and brother-in-law Vivian Imerman and a £190 million loan from German investment bank WestLB. Initially chairman then CEO, Imerman instituted an aggressive cost-cutting programme and bought out 60 shareholder employees before, in 2005, purchasing the remaining interests in the firm with the Tchenguiz brothers. In 2007, they sold the company to Indian-based United Spirits Limited for £595 million.

In August 2013, key members of United Spirits Limited (USL), a subsidiary of United Breweries that owned Whyte & Mackay, resigned from positions at Whyte & Mackay in the wake of the purchase of a controlling share of USL by Diageo, including USL Chairman Vijay Mallya, Whyte & Mackay CEO John Beard, and director Ayani Nedungadi. Regulators in the UK were investigating whether to force United to divest itself of Whyte & Mackay before the sale due to anti-trust concerns over Diageo's dominant position in Scotch whisky production. On 16 September 2013, Whyte & Mackay appointed Bryan Donaghey as its new CEO. Donaghey formerly served as managing director of Diageo for Scotland and prior to Diageo held posts within the Scotch Whisky Association.

On 31 October 2014, the India-based United Spirits sold Whyte & Mackay for £430 million to the Philippines-based Alliance Global Group and controlled by the group beverage production arm, Emperador Inc.

In 2024 the company recorded record pre-tax profits of £96M, mainly down to the success of The Dalmore. As of 2024, the company's assets sat at £1billion.

== United States ==
In October 2011, Whyte & Mackay formed an import company in the U.S.—Whyte & Mackay Americas—to handle its portfolio in the U.S. market with products including the Jura, The Dalmore, Cluny, John Barr, Glen Salen, Whyte & Mackay and Mackinlay's whisky brands, as well as Glayva Liqueur, Snow Leopard and Pinky vodkas in the U.S.

The company appointed former Bacardi executive Jorge Gutierrez as president of Whyte & Mackay Americas. In July 2013, Gutierrez left Whyte & Mackay Americas to become CEO of Voli Vodka. In September 2013, Whyte & Mackay appointed alcoholic beverage specialist Park Street to provide importing, back-office and enterprise resource planning services for its Whyte & Mackay Americas unit.

On 1 January 2016, the family-owned wine producer E & J Gallo Winery took over as the US importer of Whyte & Mackay's portfolio.

In June 2025, Whyte & Mackay Fettercairn launched in the US. The offering consisted of the 28, 40, 46 and 50-year-old single malt whisky.

The current Whyte & Mackay North America HQ is situated in New York City, USA.

As well as the United States, Whyte & Mackay have a presence in China, India, and South Africa, plus several European countries such as France, Spain, Belgium and Germany.

== Distilleries ==
Whyte & Mackay operates several distilleries in Scotland:

=== Single Malt ===
- Jura
- Fettercairn
- Dalmore
- Tamnavulin

=== Grain ===
- Invergordon

== Products ==
The company sells Single Malt and Blended Scotch whiskies, Liqueurs, Brandy, Cognac and Sherry. Their brands include:

Single Malt Whiskies: Dalmore, Fettercairn, Jura and Tamnavulin.

Blended Whiskies: Whyte & Mackay, The Woodsman, Shackleton, John Barr and Claymore.

Also in their portfolio: Nemiroff Vodka, Fundador Brandy, Wildcat Gin, Glayva Liqueur, Harveys Sherry, Camus Cognac and The Whisky Works.

In August 2010, it was reported that Whyte & Mackay would replicate a supply of whisky discovered in Antarctica from a 1907 expedition of Antarctic explorer Ernest Shackleton's supplies. The 11 bottles of whisky recovered were of the Mackinlay brand, and Whyte and Mackay now oversee those distilleries.

On 14 October 2010, Whyte & Mackay sold two bottles of their 64-year-old Dalmore Trinitas malt whisky for £100,000 each. According to the master distiller, only three bottles of this whisky were ever made, and it cannot be made again.

== Awards ==
- In 2006, Whyte & Mackay whisky was entered in the 2006 World Quality Awards, organized by Monde Selection, and awarded a Gold Quality Award.
- In 2009, 30-year-old Whyte & Mackay whisky was voted the best blended whisky in the world in two competitions.
- In 2011, Whyte & Mackay whisky won International Wine & Spirits Competition Gold - Best in Class.
- In 2012, White & Mackay whisky won San Francisco Spirits Competition 2012 Gold medal.
- In 2013, 2014 and 2015 Whyte & Mackay whisky won Wine & Spirits Competition Gold medal.
- In 2018 and 2020 White & Mackay whisky won International Spirits Challenge Gold Medal.

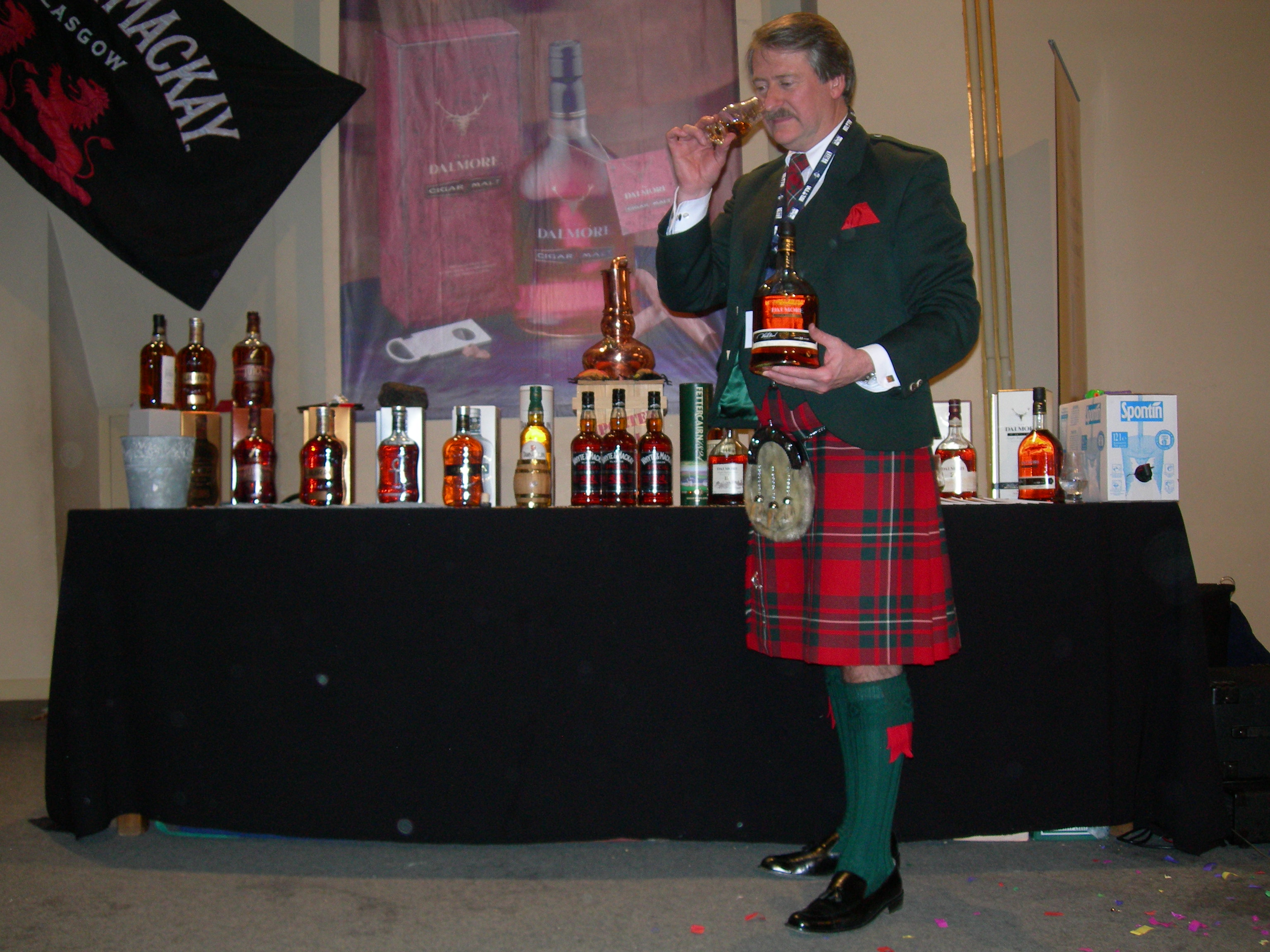
Master blender Richard Paterson of Whyte & Mackay

== Former sports sponsorship ==
Whyte & Mackay were sponsors of the English football team Leeds United from 2003 to 2006. The brand also formerly sponsored Edinburgh club Hibernian in the Scottish Premier League, the Royal Challengers Bangalore in the Indian Premier League, the PDC Premier League Darts and the Force India Formula One racing team.

In 2007, Whyte & Mackay signed a three-year contract with the Professional Darts Corporation to sponsor the Premier League Darts starting in 2008. The League was renamed the Whyte & Mackay Premier League Darts.

Whyte & Mackay also sponsored the London-based rugby team, the London Wasps, for the 2012 season.

Whyte & Mackay sponsored the 2017 British and Irish Lions tour of New Zealand. The campaign featured “dapper” lions, reflecting the lions on the Whyte & Mackay bottle.

== As treasure ==
Bottles of Whyte & Mackay were recovered by underwater archaeologist E. Lee Spence from the shipwreck of the SS Regina, which had been sunk in Lake Huron in 1913. A People magazine article that told of the recovery, had a picture of Spence on the bow of the salvage boat hoisting a full bottle of Whyte and Mackay.

== Sustainability ==
Whyte & Mackay is developing a plan to achieve carbon net zero by 2040. The company has taken action so far to decarbonise. In 2023, a partnership with Carbon Capture Scotland was announced to capture and recycle CO2 produced during fermentation at the firm's distilleries.

In 2022, the distiller backed a bid to build a green freeport in the Cromarty Firth near their Dalmore and Invergordon distilleries.

In 2024, a biomass boiler was installed to power the Jura distillery on the island.
