= Seagram =

Canadian multinational conglomerate (1857–2000)

The Seagram Company Ltd.
- Trade name: Seagram's
- Traded as: TSX: VO; NYSE: VO
- Industry: Beverages
- Founded: 1857; 169 years ago, in Waterloo, Ontario, Canada
- Defunct: December 11, 2000; 25 years ago
- Fate: Broken up: Core business assets split and sold to Diageo, Pernod Ricard and Infinium Spirits; Universal Studios's television operations and studios Interscope Communications, Gramercy Pictures, and October Films sold to USA Networks; Remaining assets sold to Vivendi to form Vivendi Universal Entertainment, which merged with NBC to form NBCUniversal in 2004
- Successors: Diageo; Pernod Ricard; Infinium Spirits; USA Networks; Vivendi Universal
- Headquarters: Montreal, Quebec, Canada
- Number of locations: Burlington; Oakville; Oshawa; Brampton; Saskatoon; Edmonton; Burnaby; Waterloo; New York City
- Key people: Joseph E. Seagram; Bronfman family
- Products: Alcoholic beverages, Ginger ale, Tonic water, Club soda
- Website: seagram.com (defunct)

The Seagram Company Ltd. (which traded as Seagram's) was a Canadian multinational beverage and, during the last five years of its existence, entertainment conglomerate formerly headquartered in Montreal, Quebec. Founded in 1857 as a distiller of Canadian whisky based in Waterloo, Ontario, it was in the 1990s the largest owner of alcoholic beverage brands in the world.

The path to the end of its independent existence started in 1995, when it sold the source of 70% of Seagram's earnings – a 25% holding of chemical company DuPont, a position it had acquired in 1981. Seagram's used the money, plus drew on increased debt positions, to purchase controlling interests in various entertainment and other business ventures, starting in 1995 with its purchase of MCA Inc., whose assets included Universal Pictures and its theme parks.

Unable to maintain financial stability, Seagram sold off assets over the remainder of the decade, until its collapse in 2000: its beverage assets were sold to industry titans Diageo and Pernod Ricard; Universal's television holdings and the studios Interscope Communications, Gramercy Pictures, and October Films were sold to Barry Diller; and finally sold the rest of the Universal entertainment empire to French conglomerate Vivendi.

== History ==
In 1857, Waterloo Distillery was founded in Waterloo, Ontario, Canada. Joseph E. Seagram became a partner with George Randall, William Roos, and William Hespeler in 1869, and sole owner in 1883, with the company later incorporated as Joseph E. Seagram & Sons. Many decades later, in 1924, Samuel Bronfman and his brothers founded Distillers Corporation Limited, in Montreal, which enjoyed substantial growth in the 1920s, in part due to Prohibition instituted in the United States in 1919. The Distillers Corporation Limited name was derived from a United Kingdom company called Distillers Company Limited, which controlled the leading brands of whisky in the UK, and which was doing business with the Bronfmans.

In 1923, the Bronfmans purchased the Greenbrier Distillery in the United States (founded by Charles Nelson in Greenbrier, Tennessee, and closed in 1909), dismantled it, shipped it to Canada, and reassembled it in LaSalle, Quebec. The Bronfmans shipped liquor from Canada to the French-controlled overseas collectivity Saint Pierre and Miquelon off the then-Dominion of Newfoundland, which was then shipped by bootleggers to rum rows in New York, New Jersey and other states.

In 1928, a few years after the death of Joseph E. Seagram in 1919, the Distillers Corporation acquired Joseph E. Seagram & Sons from heir and President Edward F. Seagram; the merged company retained the Seagram name. The company was prepared for the end of Prohibition in 1933 with an ample stock of aged whiskeys, ready to sell to the newly-opened American market.

Although he was never convicted of criminal activity, Samuel Bronfman's dealings with bootleggers during the Prohibition-era in the United States have been researched by various historians and are documented in various peer-reviewed articles.

In the 1930s, when Seagram established business in the United States, it paid a fine of $1.5 million to the US government to settle delinquent excise taxes on liquor illegally exported to the US during Prohibition. The US government had originally asked for $60 million.

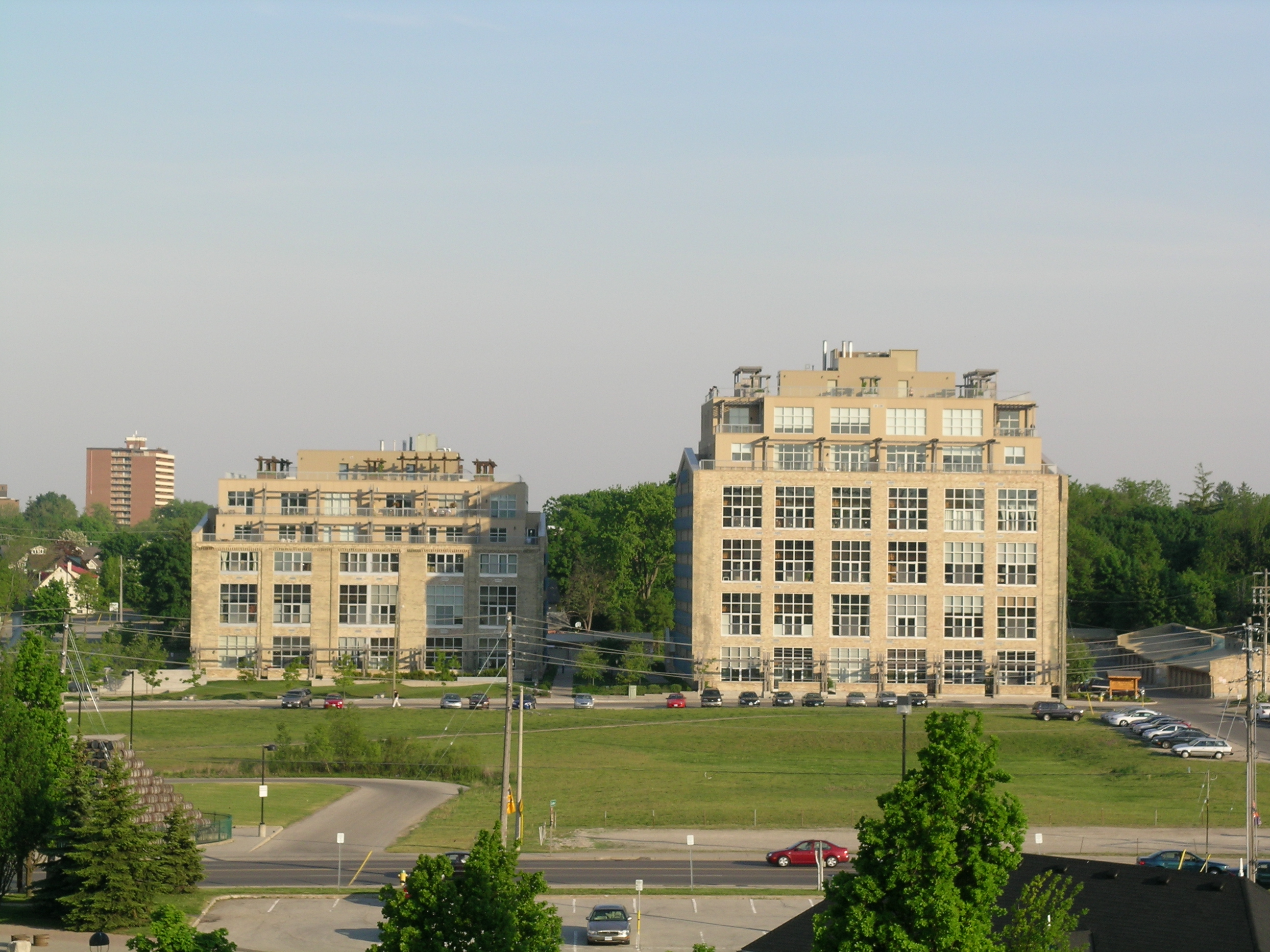
Original Seagram Distillery buildings in Waterloo, now converted to residential condominiums, Seagram Lofts, at 5 Father David Bauer Drive

From the 1950s, most of Distillers-Seagram was owned by the four children of Samuel Bronfman, through their holding company Cemp Investments. The three most popular Seagram distilled products in the 1960s through 1990s were Seven Crown, VO, and Crown Royal.

In 1963, Seagram purchased the Texas Pacific Coal and Oil Company for $61 million in cash and a $216 million production payment sale to Glanville Minerals Corporation of New York. Texas Pacific Coal and Oil Company was merged Frankfort Oil Company, another oil-producing company owned by Seagram. The new firm was named Texas Pacific Oil Company. In 1980, the Bronfman heirs sold the Texas Pacific Oil holdings to Sun Oil Co. for $2.3 billion.

After the death of Samuel Bronfman in 1971, Edgar Bronfman Sr. was named chairman and chief executive officer (CEO) until June 1994 when his son, Edgar Bronfman Jr., was appointed CEO.

In 1978, Seagram's took over the Stonyfell winery in the eastern foothills of Adelaide from Dalgety Australia, around which time the winemaking part of the business at Stonyfell was wound up.

During the early 1980s, Seagram's attempted to acquire St. Joe Minerals. However, it was outbid by Fluor Corporation.

In 1981, cash-rich and wanting to diversify, the U.S.-based subsidiary Seagram Company Ltd. attempted to engineer a takeover of Conoco Inc., a major American oil and gas producing company. Although Seagram acquired a 32.2% stake in Conoco, DuPont was brought in as a white knight by the oil company and entered the bidding war. Seagram lost the bidding war, though in exchange for its stake in Conoco it became a 24.3% owner of DuPont. By 1995, Seagram was DuPont's largest single shareholder with four seats on its board.

In 1986, the company started a TV commercial campaign advertising its Golden wine cooler products. Using Bruce Willis as the spokesperson in its advertising, Seagram rose from fifth place among distillers to first in just two years.

In 1987, Seagram engineered a $1.2 billion takeover of French cognac maker Martell & Cie. In 1988, Seagram acquired American fruit-based beverage company Tropicana for $1.2 billion.

=== Path to destruction ===
In 1995, Edgar Bronfman Jr. was eager to enter the film and electronic media business. On April 6, 1995, after being approached by Bronfman, DuPont announced a deal whereby the company would buy back its shares from Seagram for US$9 billion. Seagram was heavily criticized by the investment community; its 24.3% stake in DuPont accounted for 70% of Seagram's earnings. Standard & Poor's took the unusual step of stating that the sale of the DuPont interest could result in a downgrade of Seagram's more than $4.2 billion of long-term debt. Bronfman used the proceeds of the sale to acquire a controlling interest in MCA from Matsushita, whose assets included Universal Pictures and its theme parks a year after.

Later in 1998, Seagram purchased PolyGram for $10.6 billion, and scattered the assets within Universal Studios, notably both Universal Music Group and Universal Pictures. The same year, Seagram sold its juice business Tropicana Products to PepsiCo for $3.1 billion.

In 2000, Seagram's entertainment division was sold to Vivendi, and, after Vivendi had acquired French media giant Groupe Canal+, it became part of the new company, Vivendi Universal, on 11 December 2000. The beverage division was sold to Diageo and Pernod Ricard.

In a 2013 interview with The Globe and Mail, Charles Bronfman (uncle of Edgar Jr.) stated about the decisions leading to the demise of Seagram: "It was a disaster, it is a disaster, it will be a disaster. It was a family tragedy."

=== Post-bankruptcy fate of assets ===
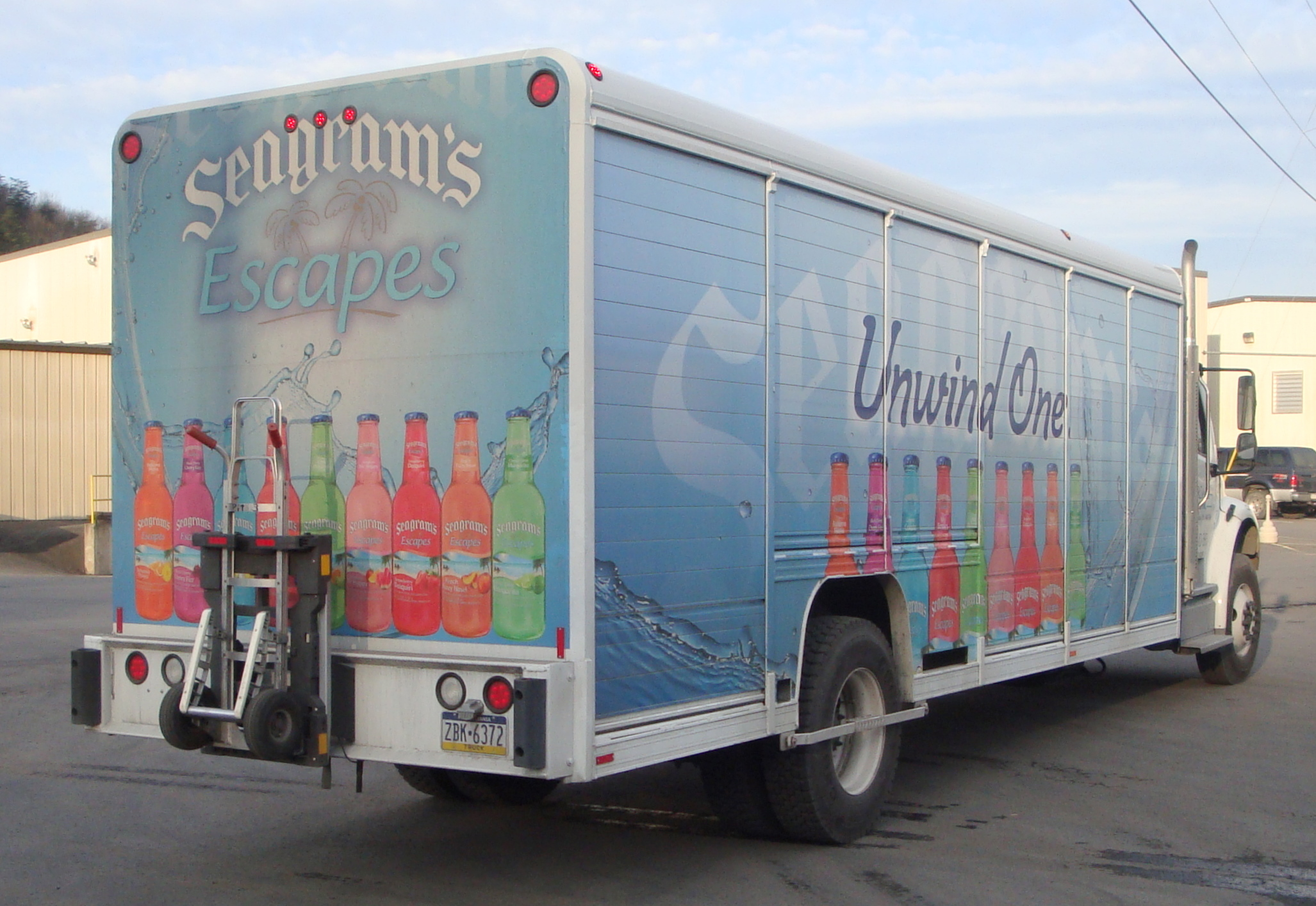
Seagram's brand outlived the company, as seen on this 2011 truck of Seagram's Escapes ready-to-drink alcoholic beverages.

By the time Vivendi began auctioning off Seagram's beverages business, the operation consisted of around 180 alcoholic drink brands and brand extensions in addition to its original high-profile brand names.

In 2002, The Coca-Cola Company acquired Seagram's Mixers (ginger ale, tonic water, club soda, and seltzer water) from Pernod Ricard and Diageo, as well as signing a long-term agreement to use the Seagram name from Pernod Ricard for these products.

A licence from Pernod Ricard to produce Seagram's Cooler Escapes and Seagram's malt-beverage brands has been held by North American Breweries (formerly KPS) since 2009.

On April 19, 2006, Pernod Ricard announced that they would be closing the former Seagram distillery in Lawrenceburg, Indiana, US. The distillery was sold in 2007 to CL Financial, a holding company based in Trinidad and Tobago which then collapsed and required government intervention. They operated the distillery as Lawrenceburg Distillers Indiana. In December 2011, the distillery was purchased by MGP Ingredients, headquartered in Atchison, Kansas. It is now known as MGP of Indiana, and continues to be the source of the components of Seagram's Seven Crown, now owned by Diageo.

== Brands ==
Seagram's had more than 180 alcohol brands at the time of the wine and spirits division sale to Diageo and Pernod-Ricard:

- Brandy & cognac: Macieira, Martell
- Gin: Seagram's Gin
- Liqueurs & bitters: Dr. McGillicuddy's, Kahlúa, Suze
- Rum: Captain Morgan, Myers's, Wood's, Trelawny
- Vodka: Absolut, Nikolai. Seagram's Vodka
- American whiskey: The Benchmark, Bulleit, Eagle Rare, Four Roses, Kessler, Makers Mark, Seagram's Seven Crown. Seagram's 83
- Canadian whisky: Crown Royal, Fireball, Seagram's VO, Seagram's Whisky
- Indian whisky: Blenders Pride, Royal Stag, Imperial Blue
- Scotch whisky:
  - Single malt Scotch whisky: Allt-A-Bhainne, BenRiach, Braeval, Caperdonich, Dalmunach, Glen Grant, Glen Keith, The Glenlivet, Longmorn, Strathisla
  - Blended Scotch whisky: Chivas Regal, Passport, Royal Salute
- Wine: Chateau St. Jean, Chateau Souverain, California, Gallo of Canada, Mumm Cuvée Napa, Sogrape Vinhos, Tessera, Sterling Vineyards, The Monterey Vineyard
- Champagne: G.H. Mumm
- Other: Seagram's Escapes, Seagram's Ginger Ale, Seagram's Seltzer, Seagram's Tonic Water

== Legacy ==
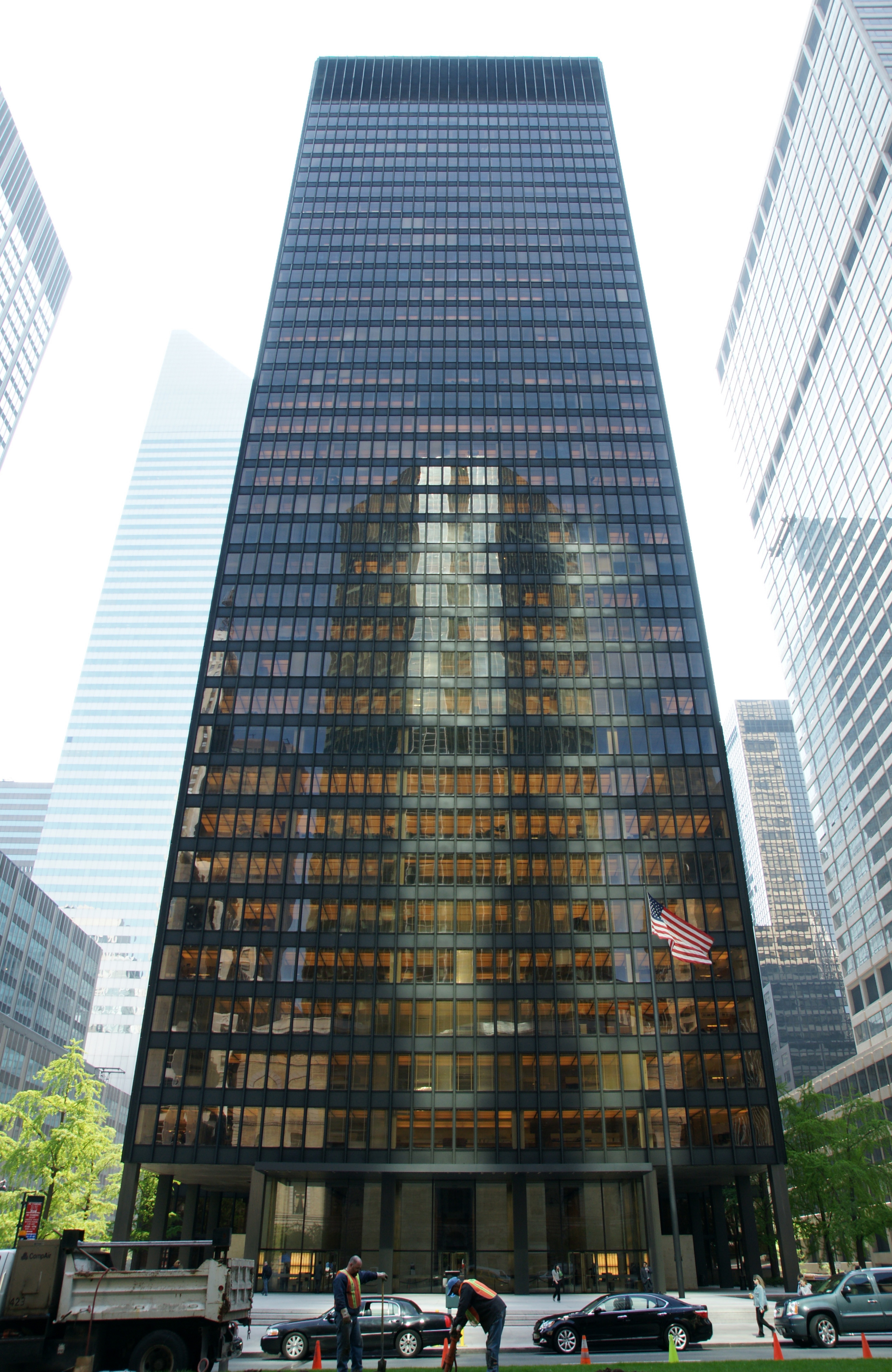
The Seagram Building in New York

The Seagram name survives today in various well-known drinks. Seagram's Seven Crown, used to make the American cocktail 7 and 7, is produced by Diageo, while Seagram's V.O. is produced by Sazerac. Several brands of coolers are produced under the Seagram name as of 2022: Seagram's Escapes are produced by Genesee Brewing for the American market, while Seagram Island Time is produced by Waterloo Brewing for the Canadian market. The Coca-Cola Company currently produces Seagram's Ginger Ale soda line since 2002 & made it widely available in 2011.

Seagram's House, the former company headquarters in Montreal, was donated to McGill University by Vivendi Universal in 2002, then renamed Martlet House. The landmarked Seagram Building, once the company's American headquarters in New York City, was commissioned by Phyllis Lambert, daughter of Seagram CEO Samuel Bronfman, and designed by architect Ludwig Mies van der Rohe with Philip Johnson. Regarded as one of the most notable examples of the functionalist aesthetic and a prominent instance of corporate modern architecture, it set the trend for the city's skyline for decades to follow, and has been featured in several Hollywood films. On completion in 1958, its costs made it the world's most expensive skyscraper. The Bronfman family sold the Seagram building to TIAA for $70.5 million in 1979.

The Seagram Museum, formerly the original Seagram distillery in Waterloo, Ontario, was forced to close due to lack of funds in 1997. The building is now the home of the Centre for International Governance Innovation as well as Shopify. The two original barrel houses are now the Seagram Lofts condominiums. There were almost 5 acres (2.0 ha) of open land, upon which the Balsillie School of International Affairs was subsequently built; construction began in 2009, and was completed in 2010.

== See also ==
- Seagram Museum
