= Glen Keith distillery =

Speyside single malt Scotch whisky distillery

Coordinates: 57°32′47″N 2°57′26″W

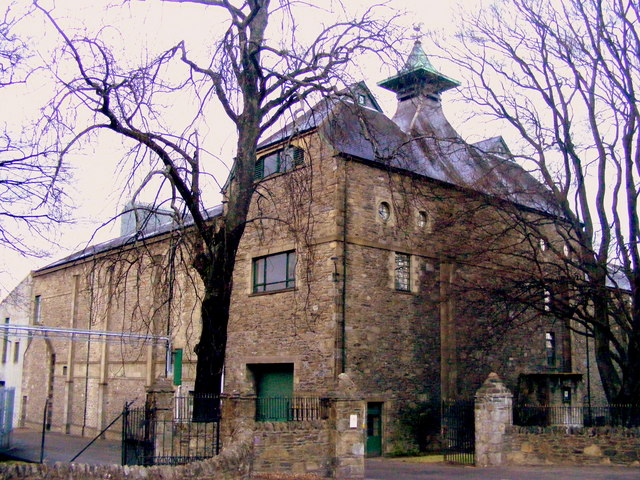

Region: Speyside
- Location: Keith, Moray
- Owner: Chivas Brothers (Pernod Ricard)
- Founded: 1957
- Status: Active
- Water source: Balloch Hill.
- No. of stills: 3 wash stills 3 spirit stills
- Capacity: 3,500,000 Litres per annum
- Mothballed: 1999-2013

Glen Keith distillery is a Speyside, single malt Scotch whisky distillery owned by Chivas Brothers in Keith, Moray. Its whisky is mainly used for blended products. It was mothballed in 1999 and re-opened in 2013.

== History ==
Glen Keith is a modern distillery. When it opened in 1958, it was the first new distillery to open in Speyside since the great whisky crash of 1898. It therefore contrasts markedly with Strathisla distillery - the third oldest in Scotland.

Construction started in 1957 on the site of a meal-mill and was completed in 1960, initially with three stills with the intention of triple distillation. In 1970, two more stills were added when production was switched to double distillation. The new production method incorporated the novelty of the first gas-fired stills in Scotland. Three years later, steam coils were also installed.

The output of the distillery was originally used in blends such as Chivas Regal, Passport and 100 Pipers but Chivas Brothers also used it as a laboratory for experiments with innovations in production and processing, for example developing their own strains of yeast.

In the 1990s the distillery released an official bottling under the name Glen Keith 1983. This bottling was replaced a few years later by a 10-year-old single malt. It also produced two peated malts under the names Glenisla and Craigduff.

The Glen Keith distillery was mothballed in 1999. Extensive reconstruction work began in 2012 and the distillery was reopened in June 2013. At the time of the distillery's reopening, Chivas Brothers intended that its annual production would be six million litres of spirit, almost all of which would be used in blended whiskies destined for export.
