= Clackmarras =

Hamlet in Moray, Scotland

Coordinates: 57.6109591928°N 3.261156682926°W

Clackmarras: Scottish Gaelic: Clach Mharrais
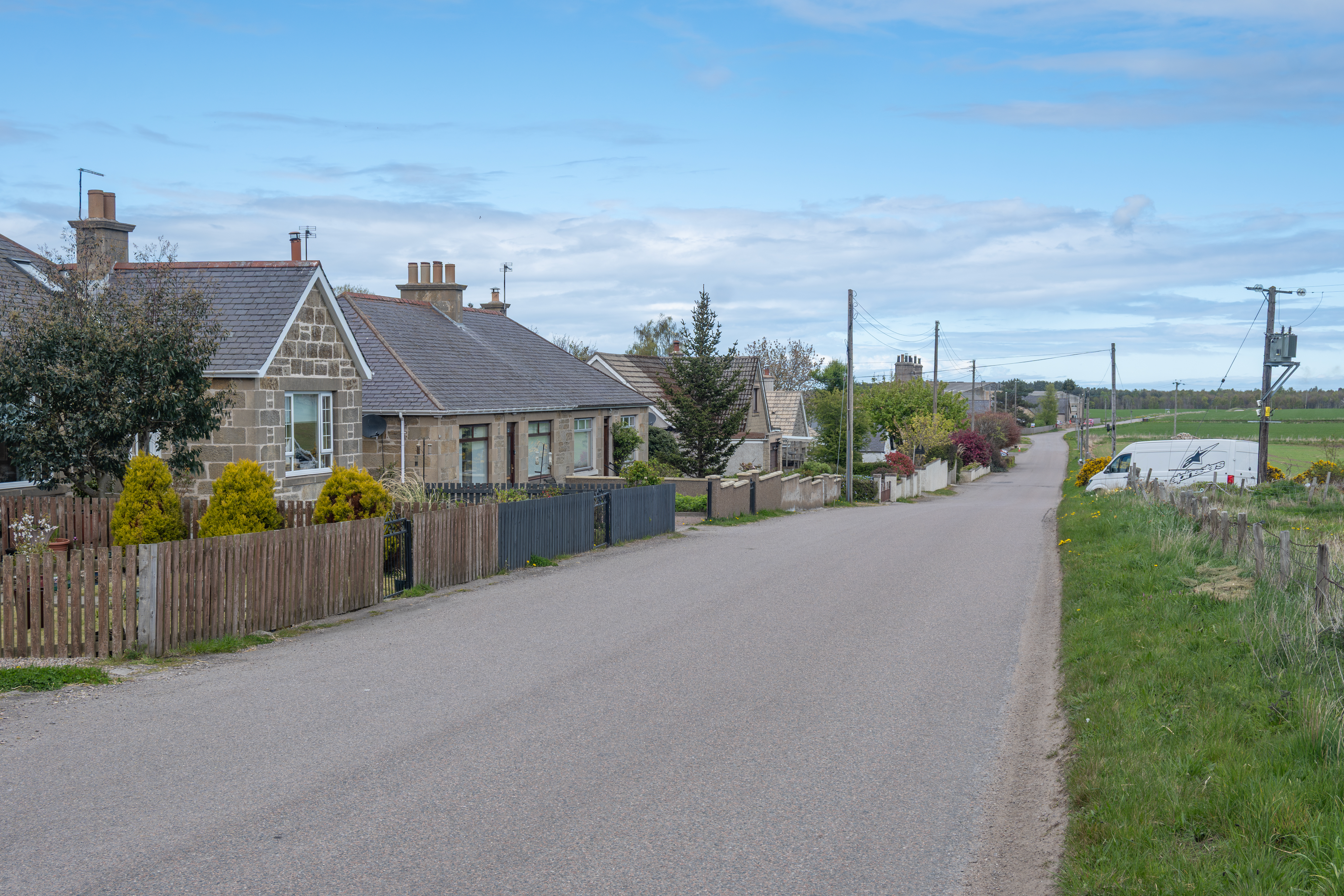

- Location within Moray
- Council area: Moray
- Lieutenancy area: Moray
- Country: Scotland
- Sovereign state: United Kingdom
- Police: Scotland
- Fire: Scottish
- Ambulance: Scottish

Clackmarras is a hamlet in Moray, Scotland, located about 2 miles (3 kilometres) south-east of Elgin.

The villages of Longmorn and Fogwatt are nearby to the east and south-east respectively.
