= Braeval distillery =

Whisky distillery in Moray, Scotland

Coordinates: 57°16′17.0″N 03°15′32.8″W

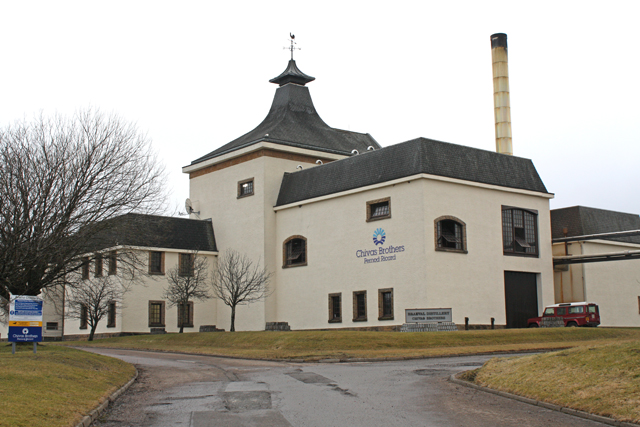

Region: Speyside
- Location: Chapeltown, Banffshire, Scotland
- Owner: Chivas Brothers (Pernod Ricard)
- Founded: 1973
- Status: Active
- Water source: Preenie & Kate's Well (distilling), Pitilie Burn (cooling water)
- No. of stills: 2 wash stills 4 spirit stills
- Capacity: 4,200,000
- Mothballed: 2002-2008

Braeval distillery is a distiller of Scotch whisky in Chapeltown, Banffshire, Scotland. Founded in 1973 as Braes of Glenlivet, the distillery is owned by Chivas Brothers. The name was changed to avoid confusion with an unrelated single malt.

== History ==
Braeval distillery was built by Chivas Brothers in 1973 to supply malt for blends such as Chivas Regal. It was built on a mountain ridge at Chapeltown in the heart of Speyside, Braeval is the highest distillery in Scotland at 350m in altitude.

In 2001, Pernod Ricard bought Chivas Brothers from Seagram.

The distillery was closed in October of 2002 but reopened in July of 2008.

In 2017, the first Braeval single malt was released.
