= Imperial distillery =

Whisky distillery in Moray, Scotland

Coordinates: 57°27′18.7″N 3°18′5″W

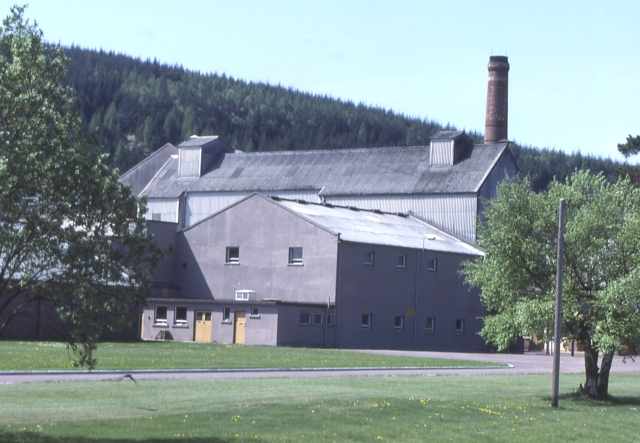

Region: Speyside
- Location: Carron, Strathspey, Scotland
- Owner: Chivas Brothers
- Founded: 1897
- Status: Closed/demolished
- Mothballed: 1899-1919; 1925-1955; 1985-1991; 1998
- Demolished: 2013

Imperial distillery was a Speyside single malt Scotch whisky in Carron, Strathspey.

== History ==
Imperial distillery was built by Thomas Mackenzie in 1897.

In 1925, Imperial joined The Distillers Company.

in 1989, Imperial distillery was sold to Allied Distillers.

The distillery was demolished in 2013 and a new distillery, Dalmunach, established on the site in 2015. Pernod Ricard bought Allied in 2005.

== Whisky ==
Imperial distillery operated sporadically between 1897 and 1998. Imperial was mothballed and reopened several times in its hundred-year history. The only official bottling was a 15-year expression, released in the mid 1990s.
