= The Glenlivet distillery =

Whisky distillery in Moray, Scotland

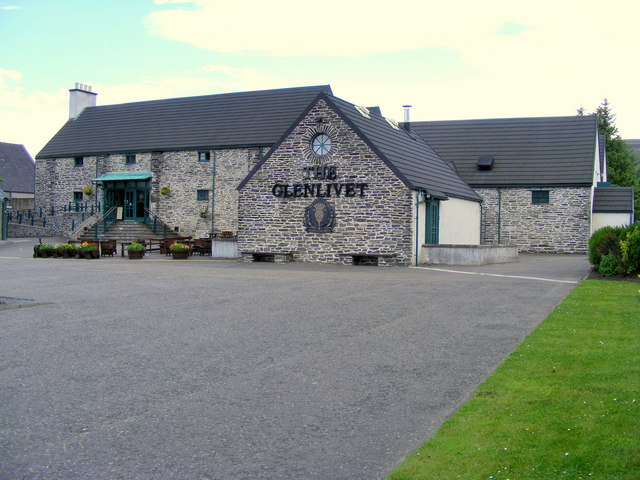

Region: Speyside
- Location: Ballindalloch, Moray, Scotland
- Coordinates: 57°20′35″N 03°20′19.3″W
- Owner: Chivas Brothers (Pernod Ricard)
- Founded: 1824; 202 years ago
- Founder: George Smith and John Gordon Smith
- Status: Operational
- Water source: Josie's Well; Blairfindy Well
- No. of stills: 14 copper pot stills (7 wash @ 15,000 L and 7 spirit @ 10,000 L)
- Capacity: 10.5 million-Lpa (litres of pure alcohol)
- Website: www.theglenlivet.com

The Glenlivet
- Age(s): 12, 15, 18, 21, 25 and 50 years
- Cask type(s): Bourbon; French oak
- ABV: 40%

Map
- The Glenlivet (Moray)

The Glenlivet distillery is a Speyside single malt Scotch whisky distillery near Ballindalloch in Moray, Scotland, that produces single malt Scotch whisky. It is the oldest legal distillery in the Highlands of Scotland. It was founded in 1824 and has operated almost continuously since.

The distillery remained open throughout the Great Depression and its only closure came during World War II. The Glenlivet distillery has grown in the post-war period to become one of the biggest single malt distilleries. The Glenlivet brand is the biggest selling single malt whisky in the United States and the second biggest selling single malt brand globally after Glenfiddich.

Today, the distillery is owned by the Chivas Brothers subsidiary of the French alcoholic beverages company Pernod Ricard, which also oversees the distillery's production of 5,900,000 proof litres per annum. The majority of this – enough for 6 million bottles – is sold as The Glenlivet single malt, with the remainder being used in Pernod Ricard's blended whisky brands.

== History ==
Illicit distilleries were commonplace throughout the Speyside area from 1700s but were largely made redundant with the passing of the Excise Act in 1823. It was under this legislation that legal distilleries could be formed, subject to holding a license. Alexander Gordon, 4th Duke of Gordon, was allegedly instrumental in the passing of this legislation. Although there is no historical record of his involvement in the issue, his tenant, George Smith, who was operating an illicit distillery on his Upper Drummin farm at the time, became the first person in Scotland to apply for and receive a license to legally produce spirit.

George Smith's decision would prove to be an unpopular decision; every other distiller was operating illegally at the time and hoping the new Excise Act would be repealed, something which would not happen if some distillers accepted the new law. Threats were made against Smith, so Gordon provided Smith with two pistols to be used to ensure both his own safety and that of the distillery. In 1824, The Glenlivet distillery was established at Upper Drumin by George Smith and his youngest son John Gordon Smith.

George Smith established a second distillery during 1849, named the Cairngorm-Delnabo Distillery but by 1855 or 1856, both distilleries were running at full capacity, and were unable to meet rising demand. The operation of two separate sites was also proving difficult and expensive, so plans were formed around the same time to build a new, larger distillery further down the hill at Minmore. Construction of this new distillery was underway when the old Upper Drumin distillery was destroyed by fire during 1858. Construction of the new Minmore distillery was speeded up and salvageable equipment from the Upper Drumin distillery was transferred to the new Minmore distillery. The Delnabo distillery was closed at the same time and the best parts of the equipment were also transferred to the Minmore plant. Production commenced at the new plant during 1859 and it was around the same time the legal entity of George & J.G. Smith, Ltd. was formed.

George Smith died in 1871 and his son John Gordon Smith inherited the distillery. The quality of the product from their distillery had resulted in the other distilleries in the area renaming their products "Glenlivet" and by the time of George's death, several distillers were doing so. J.G. Smith took legal action to claim ownership of The Glenlivet name. The legal action was partially successful, with the verdict forcing other distillers in the area to stop calling their whisky Glenlivet and gave J.G. Smith and the blender Andrew Usher sole permission to use the brand. However other distilleries were permitted to hyphenate their distillery name with the "Glenlivet" name, which resulted in new distillery names such as The Glen Moray-Glenlivet Distillery.

The distillery remained open throughout the Great Depression, an event which affected many other distilleries; it wasn't until the Second World War that the distillery was mothballed for the first time, by Government decree. In the aftermath of World War Two, Britain was heavily indebted and needed to export large quantities of goods to earn foreign revenue (mainly United States dollars). Distilling was an ideal industry with whisky much in demand overseas. Distilling restrictions were rapidly lifted and output from the distillery was at pre-war levels by 1947, despite ongoing barley, fuel, and manpower limitations. Bread rationing was retained until 1948 in order to ensure supplies of grain for the distilleries.

Glenlivet Distillery (George & J.G. Smith, Ltd.) merged with the Glen Grant Distillery (J. & J. Grant Glen Grant, Ltd.) in 1953 to form The Glenlivet and Glen Grant Distillers, Ltd.. The company would go on to merge with Hill Thomson & Co., Ltd. and Longmorn-Glenlivet Distilleries, Ltd. in 1970 before changing their name to Glenlivet Distillers Ltd in 1972.

The company was then purchased by Canadian drinks and media company Seagram in 1977. Seagram's alcohol production interests were acquired by Pernod Ricard and Diageo during 2000, with ownership of Glenlivet Distillers passing to Pernod Ricard. While Glen Grant Distillery was sold to Campari Group in 2005 Pernod Ricard kept control over the Glenlivet and Aberlour single malt whisky brands.In 2007, The Glenlivet was the best selling malt whisky in the United States, and the fourth best selling in the UK with a 7% market share. The Glenlivet is the world's second best selling single malt whisky, and current global sales total 6 million bottles per annum. The distillery became a major stop on the Scotland's Malt Whisky Trail of seven working Speyside single malt distilleries in the Strathspey, Scotland region. During the Glenlivet tour (after paying a fee), visitors can sample three of the products.

In May 2021, barley seeds from the distillery went to the International Space Station aboard a Space X Rocket to test the extreme conditions of outer space. The seeds will be planted and distilled into a single malt.

== Production ==
The distillery draws water from Josie's Well and other springs a short distance from the distillery. The malt comes from Crisp Maltings, Portgordon. Glenlivet's stills are lantern shaped with long, narrow necks, all of which help to produce a light-tasting spirit.

The distillery has seven wash stills, each with a capacity of 15,000 litres, and seven spirit stills with a capacity of 10,000 litres. The spirit is then matured in oak casks.

Glenlivet is categorised as a Speyside distillery. As of 2016, The Glenlivet range consists of 14 whiskies.

The main product range from the distillery is The Glenlivet range of single malt scotch whisky, but whisky from the distillery is also used in the production of Pernod Ricard's other brands, including the Chivas Regal and Royal Salute whisky brands.

Bottling of The Glenlivet took place at a Chivas Brothers bottling plant at Newbridge just outside Edinburgh, but that plant was sold at the end of 2009 with bottling to be transferred to other Chivas Brothers plants.

In 2008, The Glenlivet announced expansion plans for the distillery to keep up with increased demand. This includes the installation of a new mash tun, new stills and new washbacks. The expansion cost the equivalent of US$15 million and significantly increased capacity. The new extension with an additional mashtun, eight washbacks and 6 stills was opened by the Prince of Wales on 5 June 2010. The capacity of the distillery has been increased by 75% The company broke ground on another expansion in September 2015.

== Products ==
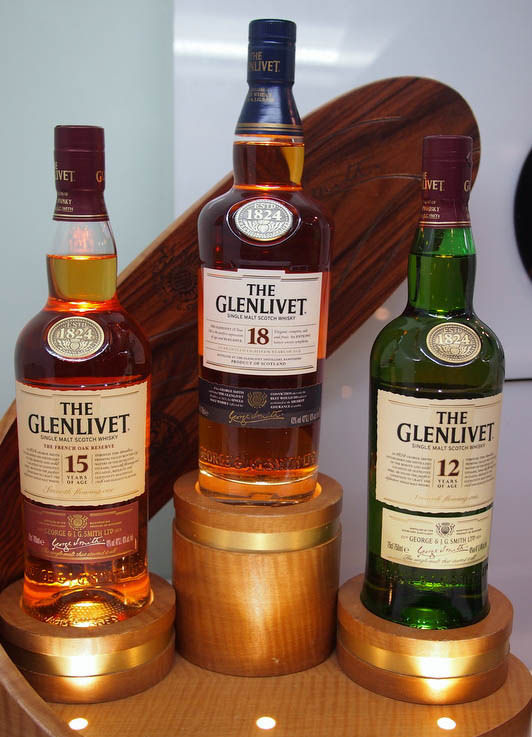
Bottles of Glenlivet

Core Range

- The Glenlivet Founder's Reserve
- The Glenlivet Captains Reserve
- The Glenlivet 12 Year Old
- The Glenlivet 14 Year Old
- The Glenlivet 15 Year Old French Oak Reserve
- The Glenlivet Nàdurra 16 Year Old
- The Glenlivet 18 Year Old
- The Glenlivet Archive 21 Year Old
- The Glenlivet XXV 25 Year Old

Limited Releases - Cellar Collection

- The Glenlivet Cellar Collection 1972 Cask Strength
- The Glenlivet Cellar Collection 1959 Cask Strength
- The Glenlivet Cellar Collection 1964 Cask Strength
- The Glenlivet Cellar Collection 1967
- The Glenlivet Cellar Collection French Oak Finish 1983
- The Glenlivet Cellar Collection American Oak Finish 30 Year Old

Travel Retail

These bottlings are only available through the travel retail market, such as airports and ferries.

- The Glenlivet 12 Year Old First Fill
- The Glenlivet 15 Year Old

Other products

- Glenlivet 70yo 1940/2010 (45.9%, Gordon & MacPhail, Generations, sherry butt, C#339, 100 Bts.)
- Glenlivet Alpha
- Glenlivet Cipher

== Awards and reviews ==
Glenlivet's offerings have frequently been reviewed at spirit ratings competitions, generally garnering relatively high praise. The Glenlivet 18yr is perhaps the most highly decorated of the offerings, winning five double golds from the San Francisco World Spirits Competition between 2005 and 2012 and yielding only slightly less impressive scores from the Beverage Testing Institute and Wine Enthusiast. The 18yr Nadurra earned a double gold medal at the 2010 San Francisco World Spirits Competition and a score of 94 (out of 100) in the same year from the Beverage Testing Institute. Other notable results include:

- The Glenlivet 12yr Single Malt: Four silver medals and a gold between 2005 and 2010 at the San Francisco World Spirits Competition.
- The Glenlivet 15yr French Oak Reserve Single Malt: gold medal at the 2009 San Francisco World Spirits Competition.
- The Glenlivet 16yr Nàdurra Single Malt: silver medal at the 2009 San Francisco World Spirits Competition.
- The Glenlivet 21yr Single Malt: two double golds, one gold, and one silver medal from the San Francisco World Spirits Competition between 2007 and 2010 and scores of 94 and 93 from the Beverage Testing Institute between 2009 and 2010.
- The Glenlivet XXV (25yr) Single Malt: silver medal at the 2009 San Francisco World Spirits Competition and a score of 95 from the Beverage Testing Institute in 2010.

== See also ==
- List of whisky brands
- List of distilleries in Scotland
