= Allt-A-Bhainne distillery =

Whisky distillery in Moray, Scotland

Coordinates: 57°23′41″N 03°12′24″W

Allt-A-Bhainne
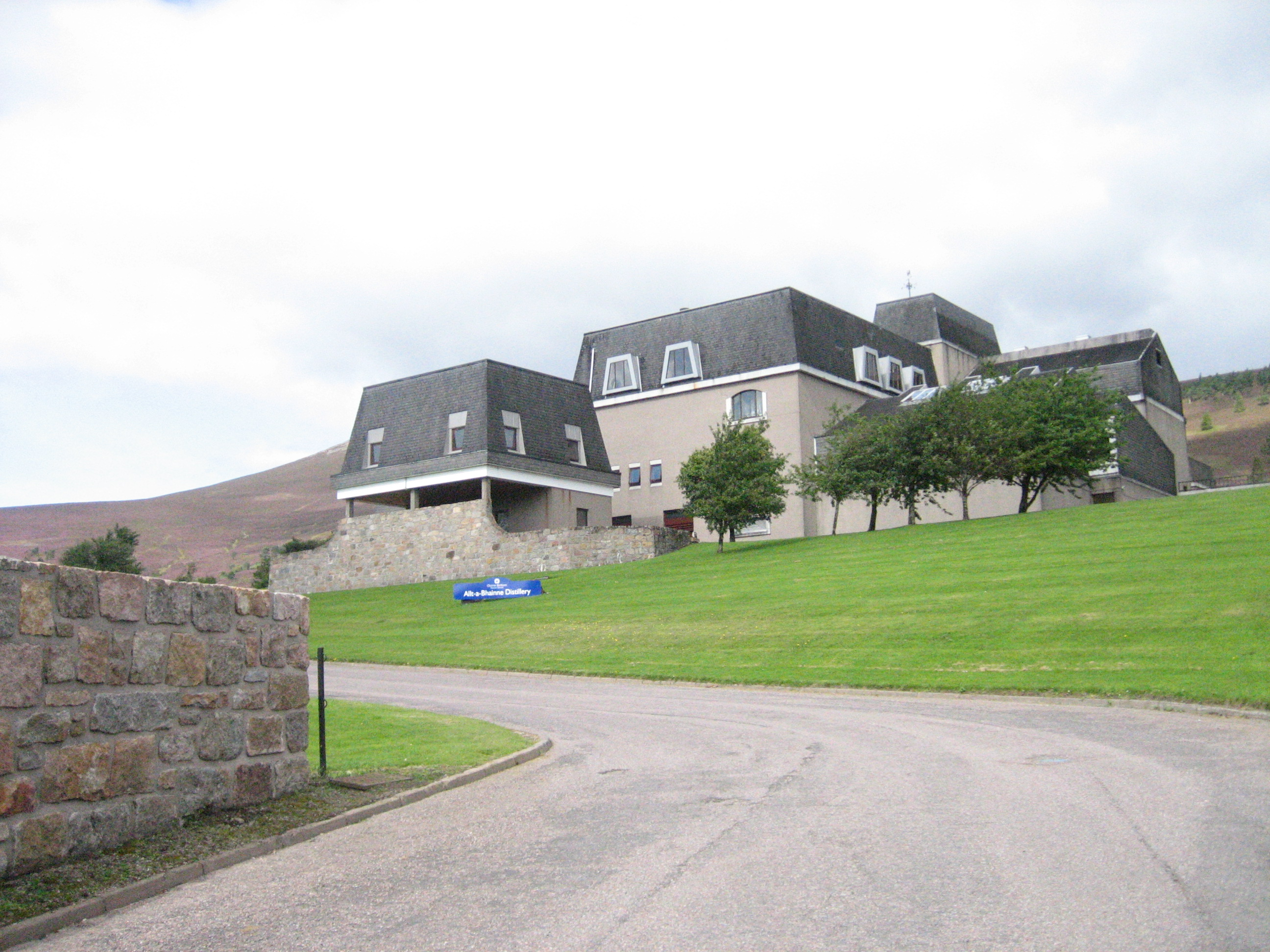

Region: Speyside
- Owner: Chivas Brothers (Pernod Ricard)
- Founded: 1975
- Status: Active
- Water source: Springs on Benrinnes
- No. of stills: 2 wash stills 2 spirit stills
- Capacity: 4,000,000 litres

Allt-A-Bhainne distillery (Scottish Gaelic: Allt a' Bhainne [al̪ˠt̪əˈvaɲə], meaning 'milk burn') is a Scotch whisky distillery in the Speyside Region of Scotland. It is located just down the road from the well-known whisky town of Dufftown. Allt-a-bhaine is one of the newer distilleries in Scotland, having been built in 1975. It was the first distillery to be designed with modernity in mind. All the equipment is in one room, and the process from start to finish can be accomplished by one person.

== History ==
Allt-a-Bhainne distillery was built in 1975, by Seagrams for the express purpose of providing bulk malt whisky for Chivas Brothers blends.

Pernod Ricard acquired Chivas Brothers in 2001. In 2002 was mothballed but reopened in 2005.

In 2018, Allt-a-Bhainne released its first official malt bottling.

== Products ==
The Allt-A-Bhainne spirit is the main malt ingredient of the Chivas Regal blended Scotch. The distillery, like most, does not bottle on site. There was a short lived single malt offering in the late 2010s although was only on the market for a few years.
