= Dalmunach distillery =

Scotch whisky distillery

Coordinates: 57°27′17.56″N 3°18′1.92″W

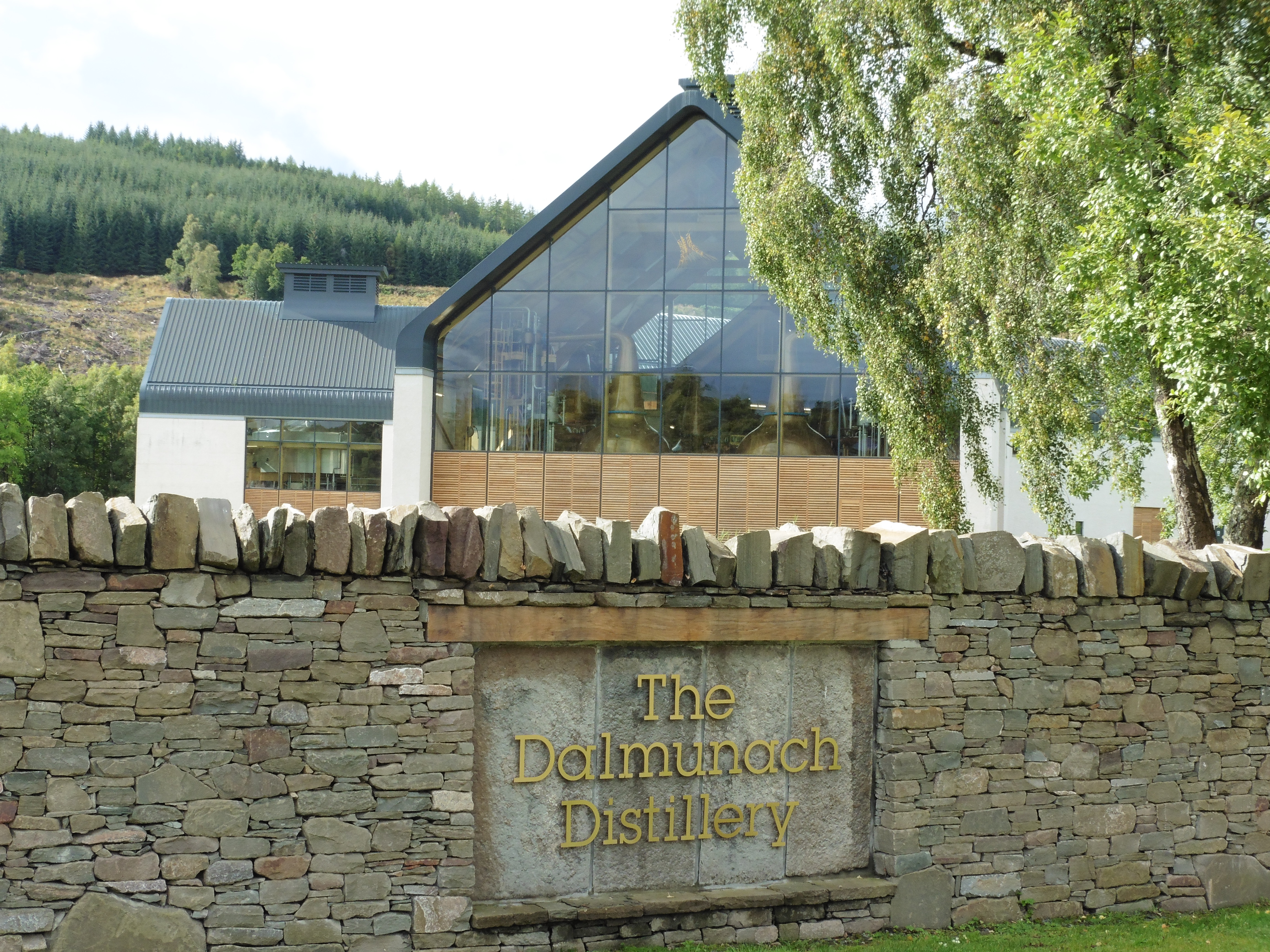
- The Dalmunach distillery from the Speyside Way

Region: Speyside
- Location: Carron
- Owner: Chivas Brothers (Pernod Ricard)
- Founded: 2015
- Water source: Balintomb water supply
- No. of stills: 4 wash stills 4 spirit stills
- Capacity: 10.000,000

Dalmunach distillery (/dəlˈmʌnəx/) is a Scotch whisky distillery located in Carron, in the whisky region of Speyside. Built for the Chivas Regal blends, it is owned by the Chivas Brothers, a subsidiary of Pernod Ricard group. The water source comes from the nearby Ballinom Burn, which originates in the Mannoch Hills. The distillery is named for a nearby pool on the River Spey. The distillery is located beside the Speyside Way and Moray Way, long-distance footpaths in the region.

== History ==
Work on the new distillery started in 2012. The new distillery occupies part of the former site of the old Imperial distillery. The distillery was officially opened in 2015 by Nicola Sturgeon, the First Minister of Scotland. The distillery cost £25 million and consists of a modern design that won the Royal Institute of British Architects Award for Scotland in 2015. The design is said to be inspired by the shape of a sheaf of barley. The distillery was designed to be energy efficient, using renewable energy sources.

In 2019, the MP Theresa Villiers visited the distillery while serving as Environment Secretary. In 2021, the MP Douglas Ross, while serving as the Leader of the Scottish Conservatives, visited the distillery.

== Whisky ==
Much of the distillery's production is used as a component in the blending of Chivas Regal. The first single malt bottlings of the distillery were in 2019, with the release of a 4 year old single cask bottling.

== Facilities ==
The distillery is one of the largest in Scotland. The distillery has a 12-tonne Briggs full Lauter mash tun. There are 16 stainless steel washbacks and eight pot stills. The spirit stills have an onion shape which pays respect to the former nearby Imperial distillery. The distillery has a capacity of 10 million litres.
