= Passport Scotch =

Brand of Blended Scotch Whisky

- Type: Scotch whisky
- Manufacturer: Chivas Brothers (Pernod Ricard)
- Country of origin: Scotland
- Introduced: 1965
- Alcohol by volume: 40%
- Website: Passport Scotch

Passport Scotch, also called Passport Blended Scotch Whisky, is a brand of scotch whisky produced by the Chivas Brothers subsidiary of Pernod Ricard in Scotland. It was first produced by Seagram Distillers, PLC.

According to Classic Blended Scotch by Jim Murray, Passport is a blend of more flavored highland malts with lighter and sweet lowland whiskies, made at Seagram's Speyside distilleries. The particular blend used in Passport Scotch was first produced in the 1960s by master blender Jimmy Lang, of Seagram's Scottish subsidiary Chivas Brothers, and started being sold in 1965. It sold 1.7 million bottles in 2015, being a strong performer in Brazil (where it is second on the Scotch whisky market), Portugal, Poland, Spain, Mexico and India.
