= Chivas Brothers =

Scottish beverage company

Chivas Brothers Ltd
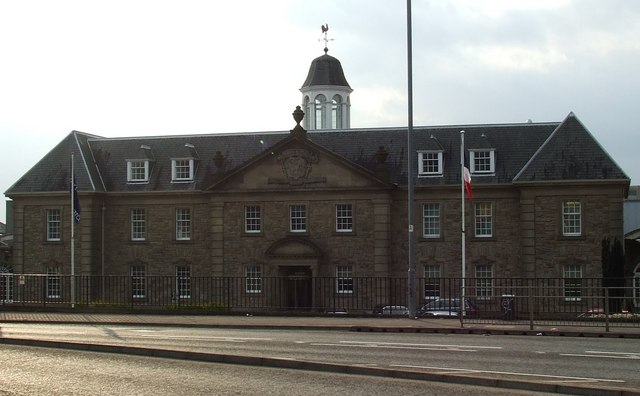
- Chivas Brothers Building
- Industry: Drink industry
- Founded: 1786; 240 years ago
- Founder: James and John Chivas
- Headquarters: Dumbarton, Scotland, UK
- Products: Alcoholic drinks
- Parent: Pernod Ricard
- Website: www.chivasbrothers.com

Chivas Brothers is a Scottish company that distills Scotch whisky. It is owned by Pernod Ricard since 2001.

The company was founded in 1786, with its home being in the Strathisla distillery at Keith, Moray in Speyside, Scotland, and is the oldest continuously operating Highland distillery.

== History ==
=== Pre-1823: prior to legalisation of whisky distillation ===
Brothers James and John Chivas, born in 1810 and 1814 respectively, were two of fourteen children born to Robert and Christian Chivas, living on a remote Strathythan farm in the Ellon Parish of Aberdeenshire. In 1836, aged 26 and 22 years, James and John decided to leave their poor rustic lifestyle in search of better prospects in Aberdeen, 30 kilometres (20 miles) away.

James joined William Edwards, who in 1828 had bought a grocery, luxury goods, wines and liquor emporium from the family members of John Forrest. Forrest had opened his store in 1801, but died in 1828. James became a partner in 1838. John began working at a wholesale footwear and apparel firm, DL Shirres and Co. This firm would be awarded distribution rights of Chivas Bros from 1860 to 1886, from around John Chivas' entry until James Chivas' death and again later.

Edwards died in 1841, and Charles Stewart took over. In 1843, Stewart and Chivas was granted a Royal Warrant to supply goods to Queen Victoria. In 1850, Stewart and Chivas was appointed Royal Grocer to the queen's mother, the Duchess of Kent, and many other Royal Warrants followed over the years. The huge advantage of getting a Royal Warrant was that upper class gentry followed royalty without a second thought, to be seen as both conformal and of cognizable status. This automatically resulted in a considerably increased footfall of the wealthy.

=== 1823–1893: legalisation of whisky distillation and origins of whisky production ===
In Scotland, distilling whisky (uisge beatha in Gaelic) had been legalised in 1823, leading to a proliferation in the number of brands. Some were produced at 70–72% alcohol by volume (ABV), but the majority were at 60–65% ABV, imbibed after cutting with water. Arthur Bell defined a "fine whisky" as one that was sold at ~65% ABV. These were savoured after adding soda.

Vatting of whiskies within bond warehouses was legalised in 1853 by The Forbes-Mackenzie Act, and, with blending, the number of brands made available for sale increased overnight. During this period, Stewart and James Chivas decided to respond to their affluent customers' demands for better whisky, by blending select malts to create a proprietary blend. The firm's first blended malt Scotch whisky, the Royal Glen Dee, was launched in 1854. Stewart left in 1857, making way for John and the company could now be named Chivas Brothers. In 1863, they launched a proprietary blended Scotch whisky, a smoothly crafted blend of 10-year-old malt and grain whiskies, Royal Strathythan.

The May 8, 1890, edition of Scotland Magazine described Chivas Brothers as "undoubtedly the finest purveying business in the north of Scotland".

=== 1893–present: post-Chivas family ===
The last Chivas family member involved in the business, Alexander, son of James, died in 1893. Control of the company thenceforth was exercised by the board of trustees; Alexander Smith, the right-hand man of Alexander Chivas; and their Master Blender, Charles Stewart Howard. In 1895, Smith and Howard offered to buy out the board of trustees and the female side of the family, removing any residual trace of Chivas family members. This proposal was accepted with the proviso that the company name would remain Chivas Brothers forever.

Chivas had agents assess market conditions in the US in the 1890s. The marketing team reported a booming economy which was looking for luxury. In 1900, Howard decided to create a new blend in memory of the founding brothers, James and John. Using the best malt and grain whiskies available in the market and inhouse, Howard blended a malt-dominated recipe. Introducing the term 'Regal', Howard created a 25 year old whisky in 1909 called Chivas Regal, the oldest Blended Scotch Whisky of its era, and launched it in the US, establishing it as the world's first and oldest luxury whisky.

It was all one way street then for Chivas Regal, from 1909 till mid 1915, during which period World War I started and became a sluggish, long-drawn affair (1914–18). Existing stocks were depleted quickly as demand outstripped supply. Shipping lanes to USA closed down, and Chivas Bros switched to building reserves at home.

Whisky Brokers Morrison & Lundie bought the company in 1936, and decided that it was far too onerous to maintain aged barrels of whisky. They wound up the 20 YO Loch Nevis and reduced the production of the Chivas 25 drastically, resulting in its withdrawal as their standard-bearer and ultimate demise. They switched focus to a 12 YO heavily marketed 'premium' brand, a decision that would be seen as wise five years later, when World War II (1939–1945) broke out in Europe. 1939 saw the debut and continued success of Chivas Regal 12 YO Blended Scotch in the US at what was to become a global standard proof value of 75 degrees, i.e., 42.8% ABV. (The Americans mark it as 86 proof as they double the ABV to arrive at proof value.) Henceforth, quality, age (generally 12 years), cost (high), popularity (sales) and demography (high-end) would define a 'Premium' Scotch Whisky.

Chivas Brothers was purchased by Seagrams in 1949, which enabled much wider distribution and marketing. Seagrams was owned by a Canadian Jew, Samuel Bronfman. When the Middle East opened up as a market post oil domination/OPEC, Seagrams' products, including Chivas Regal, were banned in the entire Arab controlled area in the early 1960s. Chivas would limp back nearly four decades later, when under Pernod Ricard, but rise rapidly thereafter to its leading position in the Asia Pacific area. In 1950, the firm bought Milton (Miltown) distillery, renaming it Strathisla, which is the brand's home in Keith to this day. Its product, Strathisla single malt, is a key malt component of the blend. In 1997, the Chivas Regal range was expanded with the launch of much older whiskies like the Chivas Regal 18 year old, and in 2007 the new Chivas Regal 25. Other expressions followed, like the Mizunara in 2014, The Icon in 2015 and the XV in 2018. In 2001, Pernod Ricard acquired Chivas Brothers. In 2015, Chivas Brothers opened the new Dalmunach distillery. In October 2023, Chivas Brothers unveiled plans to build a new carbon neutral distillery on Islay, expected to product peated single malt.

== Whisky distilleries ==
Chivas Brothers operates many whisky distilleries in Scotland:

=== Single Malt ===
- Aberlour distilery
- Allt-A-Bhainne distillery
- Braeval distillery
- Dalmunach distillery
- Glenburgie distillery
- Glen Keith distillery
- The Glenlivet distillery
- Glentauchers distillery
- Longmorn distillery
- Miltonduff distillery
- Scapa distillery
- Strathisla distillery

=== Grain ===
- Strathclyde distillery

== Brands ==
Chivas Brothers beverage brands include:

Scotch whisky:

- Single malt Scotch whisky: Aberlour, Glen Keith, The Glenlivet, Longmorn, Scapa
- Blended Scotch whisky: 100 Pipers, Ballantine's, Chivas Regal, Long John, Passport, Royal Salute, Something Special
