= Jack Richardson (cricketer) =

Scottish cricketer

Personal information
- Full name: John Charles Richardson
- Born: 5 December 1912; Carron, Morayshire, Scotland
- Died: 10 March 1990 (aged 77); Aberdeen, Aberdeenshire, Scotland
- Batting: Unknown

Domestic team information
- Years: Team
- 1938–1939: Northumberland
- 1953: Scotland

Career statistics
Competition	First-class
Matches	2
Runs scored	32
Batting average	10.66
100s/50s	–/–
Top score	24
Catches/stumpings	1/–
- Source: Cricinfo, 20 October 2022

John 'Jack' Charles Richardson (5 December 1912 — 10 March 1990) was a Scottish first-class cricketer and architect.

The son of James Richardson, a customs and excise officer, and his wife Grace Smith Matheson, he was born in Carron, Morayshire in December 1912. Pursuing a career as an architect, he undertook an apprenticeship with Sutherland & Taylor in Aberdeen before proceeding to the Aberdeen School of Architecture in 1933, where he studied for the following three years. He was admitted to the Royal Institute of British Architects in 1937, having secured an appointment to the Aberdeen City Architect's Department. From 1937 to 1940, Richardson played minor counties cricket in England for Northumberland, making two appearances for the county in the Minor Counties Championship against Durham in 1938 and 1939. By 1940, he had been appointed to the Ministry of Works as an assistant surveyor, and had been appointed a district surveyor at The Ministry by 1950. Richardson made two appearances in first-class cricket for Scotland in 1953, against Northamptonshire at Peterborough and Yorkshire at Glasgow. He scored 32 runs in these matches, with a highest score of 24. In the same year that he played for Scotland, Richardson was also appointed to the Royal Incorporation of Architects in Scotland. He retired in December 1972, settling in Aberdeen. He died there at Woodend Hospital in March 1990 and was survived by his wife, Dorothy, and their daughter, Julia.
