= Longmorn =

Coordinates: 57°36′30″N 3°16′55″W

Longmorn: Scottish Gaelic: Lann M'Eàrnain
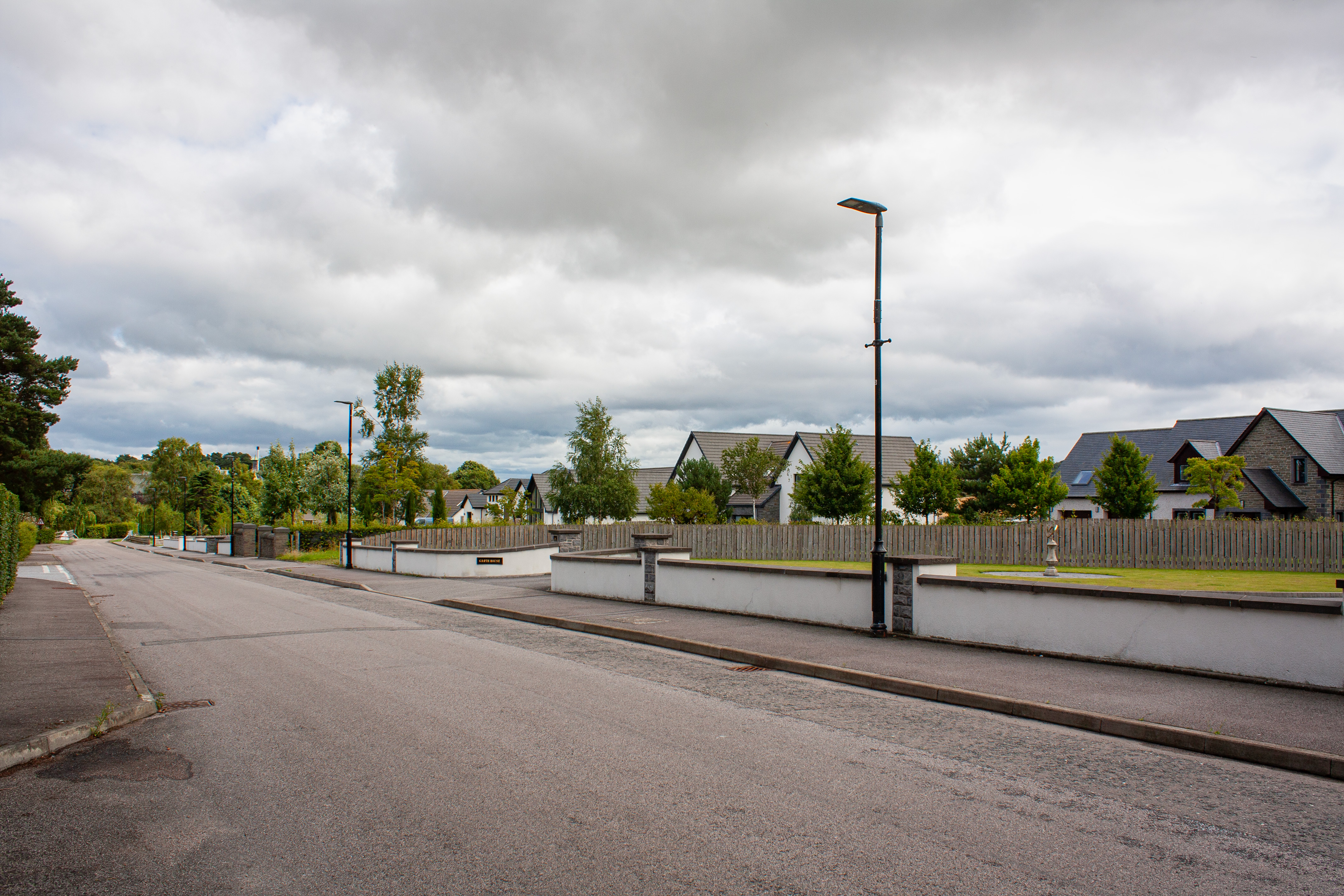

- Location within Moray
- OS grid reference: NJ230583
- Council area: Moray
- Lieutenancy area: Moray
- Country: Scotland
- Sovereign state: United Kingdom
- Post town: ELGIN
- Postcode district: IV30
- Police: Scotland
- Fire: Scottish
- Ambulance: Scottish
- UK Parliament: Moray West, Nairn and Strathspey
- Scottish Parliament: Moray

Longmorn (Scottish Gaelic: Lann M'Eàrnain, St Earnain's Church) is a village in Moray, Scotland, famous for its malt whisky distilleries. It lies approximately 2.5 miles (4 km) south of Elgin, on the main road from Elgin to Rothes.

This village was once a small railway junction, and the beginning of the Birnie Distillery rail spur; the now disused Elgin to Craigellachie line then continued south to Aviemore and beyond. Longmorn station and its platform still survive and are in good condition. While the station house is lived in, the track is long gone. There are currently moves to clear the track to create a cycle path that would link Elgin to the Speyside Way at Craigellachie and from there to Aviemore and the National Cycle Network.

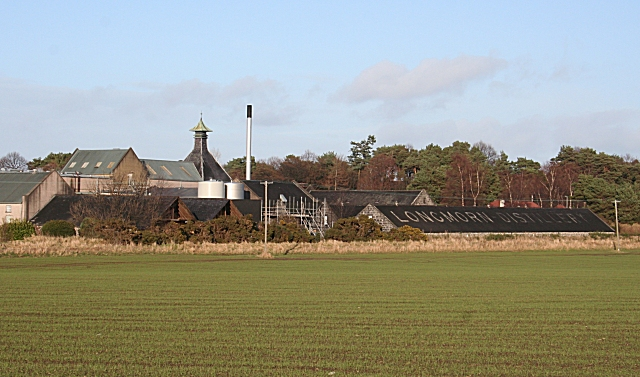
Longmorn distillery

Most of the village is taken up by the BenRiach distillery (reopened 2004), and the Longmorn distillery. Relatively few people are employed in them and the village is mainly a dormitory of Elgin.

The village of Fogwatt and the hamlet of Clackmarras are nearby to the south and west respectively.
