= Longmorn distillery =

Whisky distillery in Moray, Scotland

Coordinates: 57°36′29.35″N 3°16′57.03″W

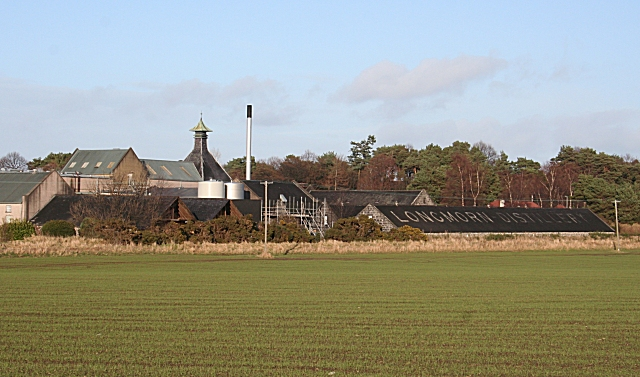
- Location: Longmorn, Moray
- Owner: Chivas Brothers (Pernod Ricard)
- Founded: 1893
- Status: Operational
- Water source: Local Springs
- No. of stills: 4 wash stills 4 spirit stills
- Capacity: 3,500,000 litres per annum

Longmorn
- Type: Single malt
- Age(s): 15, 16 Years
- Cask type(s): American White Oak, Ex-Bourbon Casks (Main)
- ABV: 40% - 43%

Longmorn distillery is a single malt Scotch whisky distillery in Longmorn, Moray, within the Strathspey whisky producing area of Scotland.

== History ==
The Longmorn Distillery Company was founded in 1893 by John Duff, Charles Shirres and George Thomson. Duff was a former manager of the Glendronach Distillery and the Bon Accord Distillery in Aberdeen, and was the founder of the Glenlossie Distillery, as well as being involved with unsuccessful distilleries in Cape Town and the USA.

Longmorn Distillery started production in December 1894. Three years later John Duff built the Benriach Distillery next to Longmorn, but both were affected by the collapse of wholesale buyers Pattisons Limited. in 1899. Duff was ruined by the collapse, and Longmorn Distilleries Company Ltd. passed through a variety of ownerships.

In 1970, Longmorn joined The Glenlivet and Glen Grant to form The Glenlivet Distillers Ltd.

In 1978, The Glenlivet Distillers Ltd was bought by Chivas Brothers.

In 2001, Chivas Brothers was acquired by the French Pernod Ricard Group.

== Reviews ==
The Longmorn 16-year expression has received warm reviews at international spirit ratings competitions. It received two silver medals from the San Francisco World Spirits Competition in 2008 and 2009. Wine Enthusiast gave it a "90-95" rating in 2009.
