= Something Special (whisky) =

Scotch whisky brand

- Type: Blended Scotch whisky
- Manufacturer: Chivas Brothers (Pernod Ricard)
- Country of origin: Scotland
- Introduced: 1912
- Alcohol by volume: 40%

Something Special is a blended Scotch whisky brand created in 1912 and belonging to the Chivas Brothers subsidiary of Pernod Ricard group.

== History ==
The brand was created by Hill Thompson and Co in 1912 and is a blend of 35 malts from the Speyside and Islay malts aged in American and European oak casks.

It is the most sold premium whisky in South America.
