= Carron, Strathspey =

Village in Moray, Scotland

Coordinates: 57.45440°N 3.29821°W

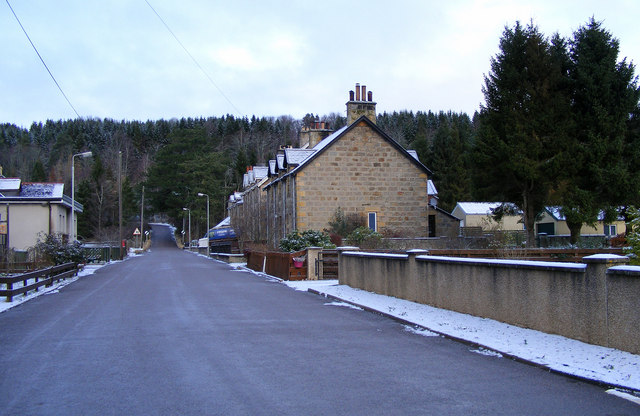
Street through Carron

Carron (Scottish Gaelic: Carrann) is a small village on the north bank of the River Spey in Moray, Scotland.

It was the site of an old distillery, the Imperial Distillery until the distillery closed in 1998 and was mothballed.

In 2015, a new distillery, Dalmunach opened in the village.

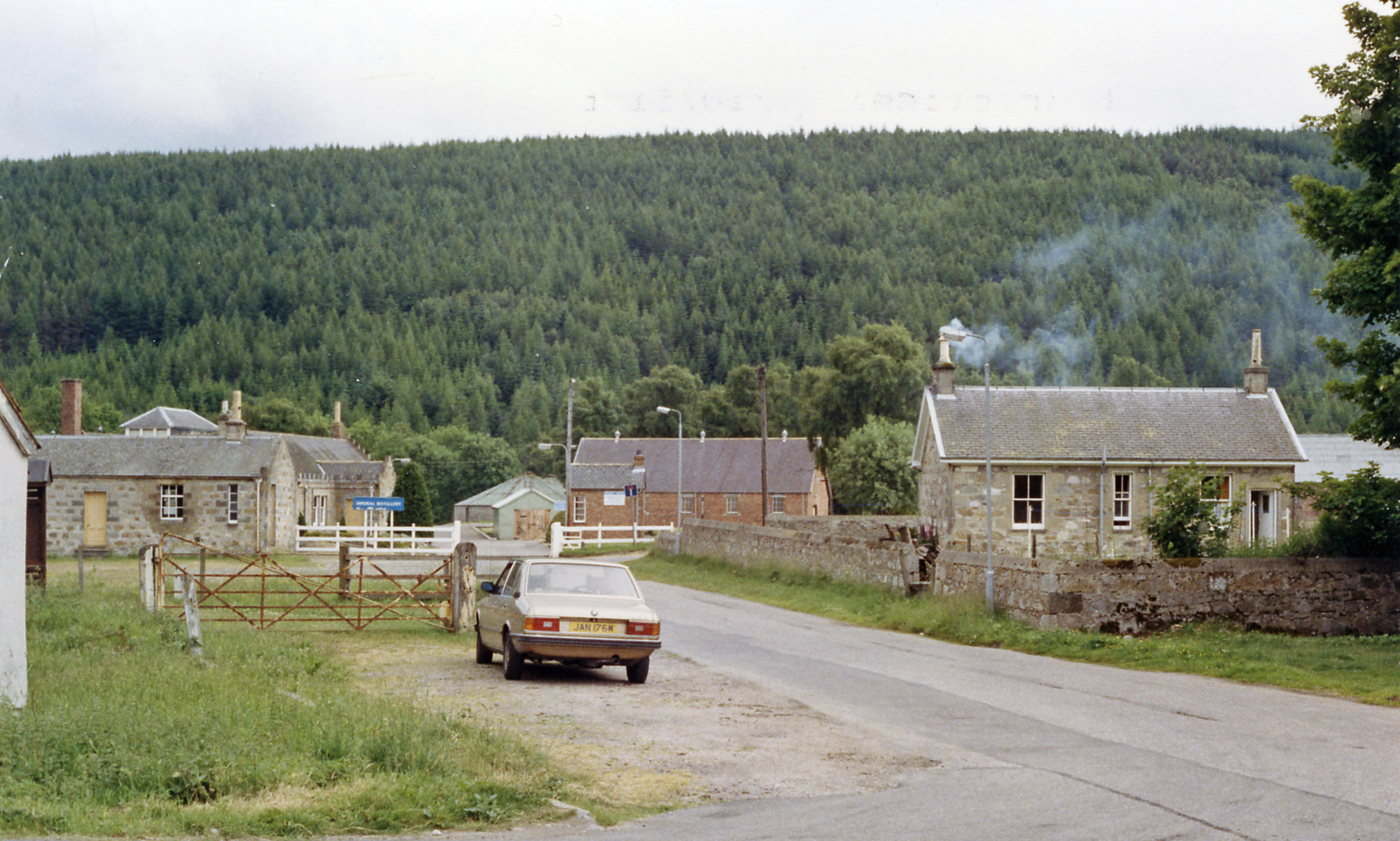
Site of Carron station, 1988

Carron had a station on the Strathspey Railway, until the line closed in the 1960s. The railway line has since become the Speyside Way long-distance path.

== Notable people ==
- Jack Richardson (1912–1990), cricketer
