= Royal Salute (whisky) =

Brand of Scotch whisky

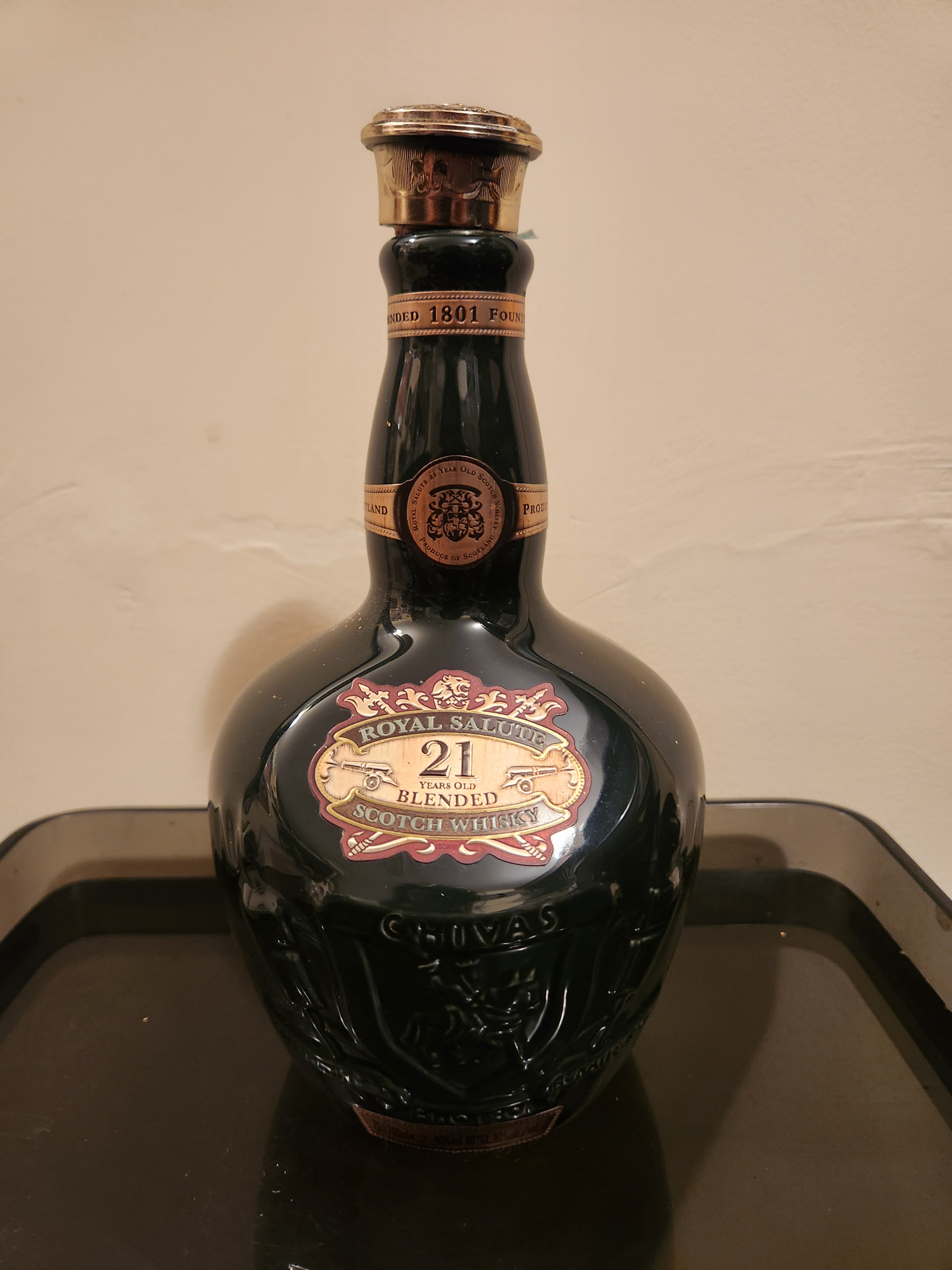
- Type: Scotch whisky
- Manufacturer: Chivas Brothers (Pernod Ricard)
- Origin: Scotland
- Introduced: 1953
- Alcohol by volume: 40%
- Variants: 21 Year Old, 100 Cask, 38 Year Old Stone of Destiny
- Related products: Chivas Regal
- Website: Royal Salute

Royal Salute is a blended Scotch whisky brand produced and bottled by Chivas Brothers in Strathisla Distillery in Speyside, Scotland.

== History ==
Royal Salute was launched by Chivas Brothers on 2 June 1953 by in tribute to Queen Elizabeth II on the day of her Coronation. Named after the ceremonial 21-gun salute that is fired from the Tower of London to mark special royal occasions, Royal Salute whiskies are aged for a minimum of 21 years, making it the only Scotch to begin its collection at exclusively 21 years-old.

== Strathisla distillery ==
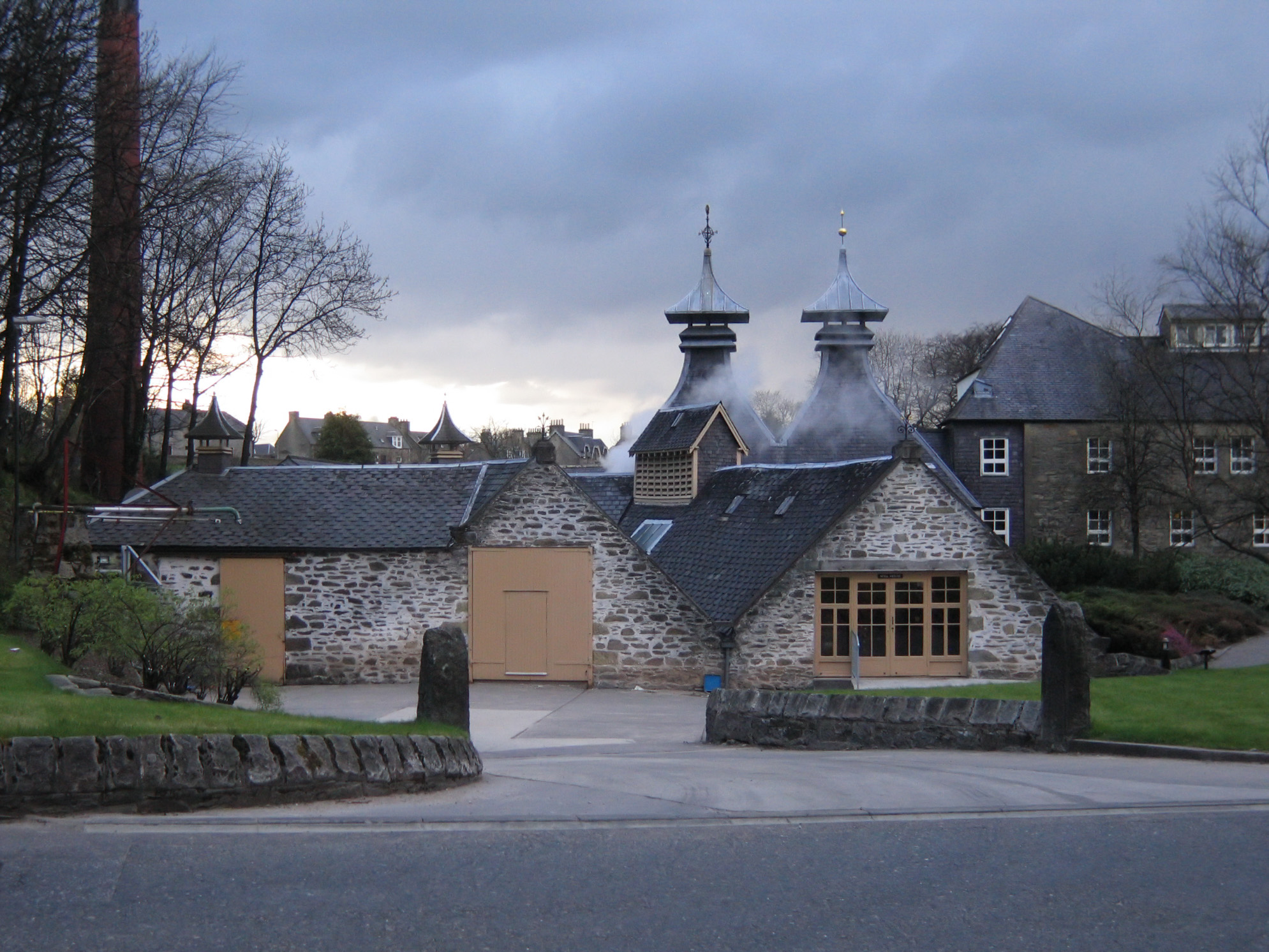
Strathisla Distillery

The brand's distillery and visitor centre are at the Strathisla distillery, located in Speyside. The distillery was founded in 1786, and it is the oldest working distillery in the Highlands of Scotland. The Strathisla distillery is owned by Chivas Brothers, and Strathisla Single Malt is one of the malt whiskies used within the Royal Salute blend.

== Brand collaborations ==
British Fashion designer Richard Quinn collaborated with Royal Salute on the first edition of the ‘Couture Collection’, which celebrates the institution of British Fashion.
