= Fogwatt =

Village in Moray, Scotland

Coordinates: 57.597°N 3.281°W

Fogwatt: Scots: Fyatt or Fywatt
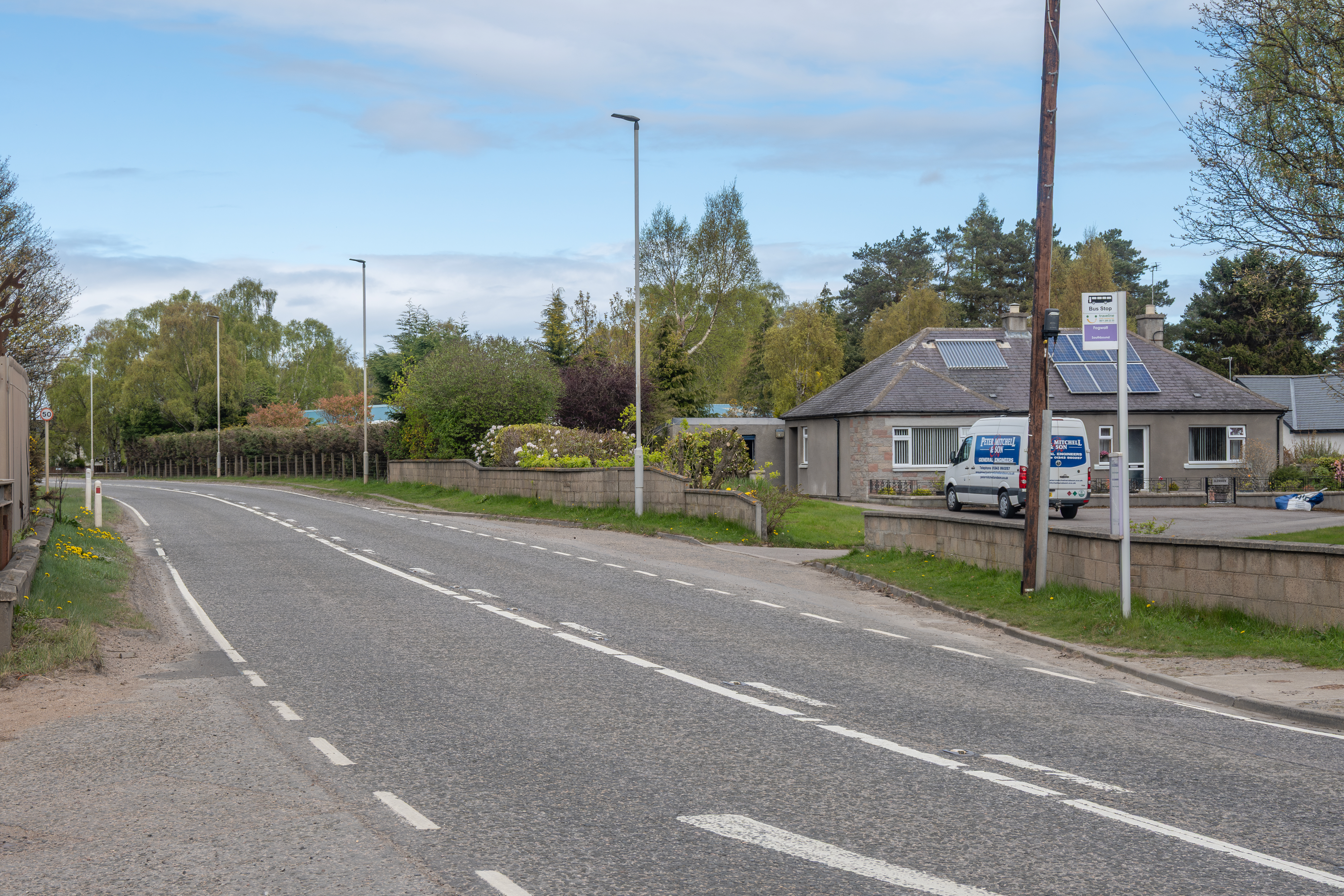

- Location within Moray
- Council area: Moray
- Lieutenancy area: Moray
- Country: Scotland
- Sovereign state: United Kingdom
- Police: Scotland
- Fire: Scottish
- Ambulance: Scottish

Fogwatt/Fywatt is a small village near Elgin, in Moray, Scotland. Fogwatt Community Hall is a local community hall that is situated on the main road towards Rothes. Also Fywatt (Old form Fi-wid) from Norse, Scandinavian word meaning 'A wood in which there might have been a church or a cell'

The Morayshire Railway once passed to the east of the village, but there was no station.

Glen Elgin distillery is located within the village.

There is a Site of Special Scientific Interest, Scaat Craig, south of the village.

Millbuies Country Park lies to the south of the village. There is a loch with surrounding walks. Car parking is available. A mobile catering van is available seasonally.
