= Strathisla distillery =

Speyside single malt Scotch whisky distillery

Coordinates: 57.54649°N 2.95427°W

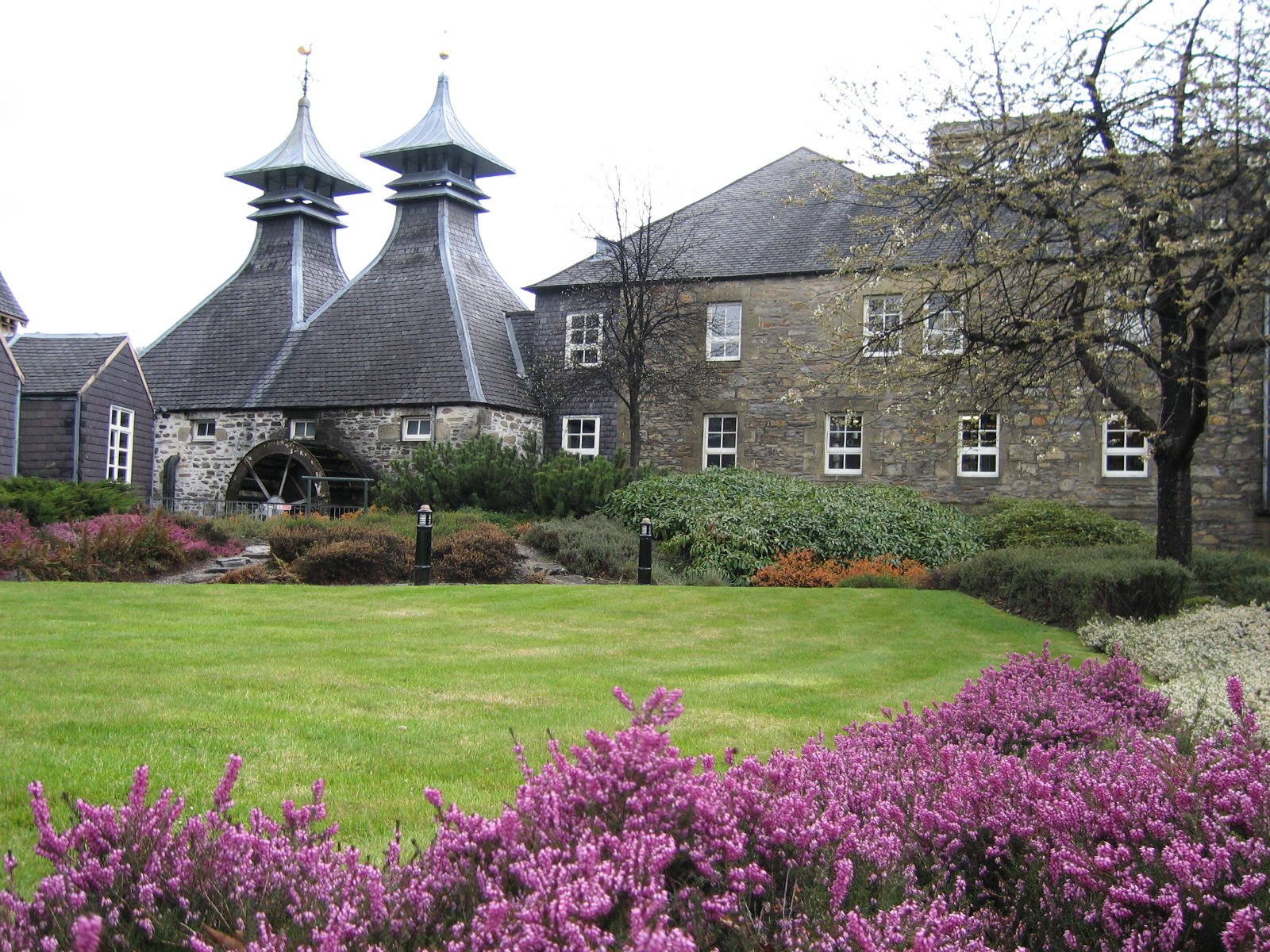

Region: Speyside
- Location: Keith, Moray, Scotland
- Owner: Chivas Brothers (Pernod Ricard)
- Founded: 1786
- Status: Operational
- Water source: The Broomhill Spring.
- No. of stills: 2 wash stills 2 spirit stills
- Capacity: 2,400,000 litres per annum

Strathisla
- Type: Single malt
- Age(s): 12 Years, 14 Years, 19 Years, 25 Years
- Cask type(s): American White Oak, Ex-Bourbon Casks (Main)
- ABV: 40% - 43%

Strathisla distillery is a Speyside single malt Scotch whisky distillery in Keith, Moray. It is the oldest continuously operating distillery in the Scottish Highlands.

== History ==
Strathisla distillery was founded as the Milltown distillery by George Taylor and Alexander Milne in 1786 as an alternative to the waning of the flax dressing industry. They leased the land from the Earl of Seafield. The name "Strathisla" comes from the Strathisla River, which flows nearby, as well as the Gaelic "Strath" (meaning valley) and "Isla," the name of the river.

By the mid-1800s, Strathisla's ownership changed several times .In 1879, the distillery suffered terribly from a fire, but was rebuilt with a bottling plant. it was later acquired in 1950 by. During the 19th century, the distillery was modernized, and production was streamlined.

In 1950 James Barclay bought Strathisla for £71,000 at auction in behalf of Seagram Company. Seagram subsidiary Chivas Brothers began using it as the cornerstone of their Chivas Regal blended whisky. During this time the distillery undergo significant modernization, as Strathisla upgraded its facilities and expanded its production capacity.

In 2001, Seagram’s whisky operations, including Chivas Brothers and Strathisla, were acquired by Pernod Ricard, a global spirits company.

== Scotland's Malt Whisky Trail ==
Scotland's Malt Whisky Trail is a tourism initiative featuring seven working Speyside distilleries including Strathisla, a historic distillery (Dallas Dhu, now a museum) and the Speyside Cooperage. According to a BBC article, visitors can tour the "traditional warehouse where the single malts that make up the premium and super premium blends are stored ... [and try the] distinctive mellow honey flavour, offering a full, nutty, balanced whisky".

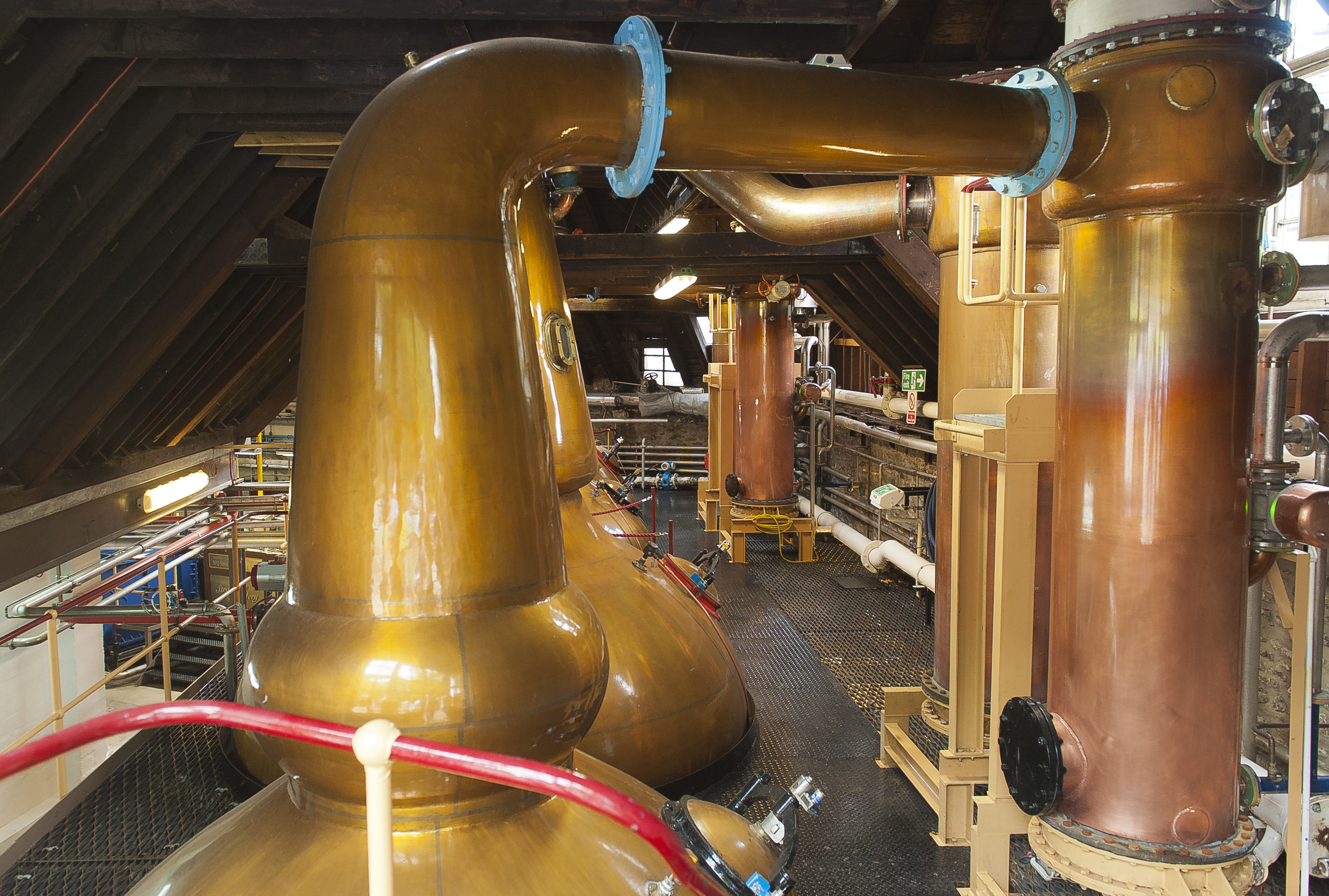
Stills

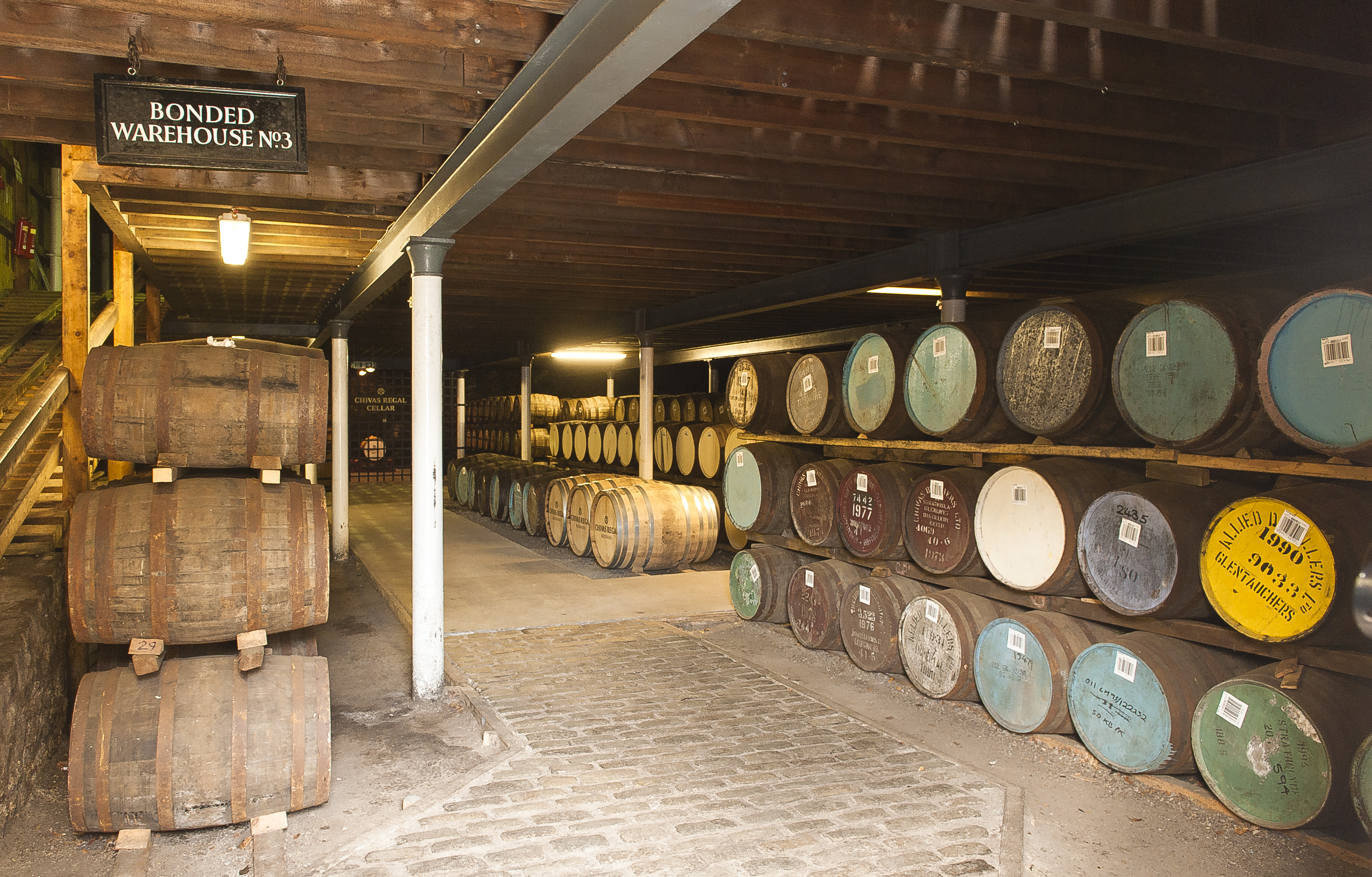
Warehouse

== See also ==
- List of distilleries in Scotland
- List of historic whisky distilleries
