= Chivas Regal =

Blended Scotch whisky

Coordinates: 57°32′44″N 2°57′08″W

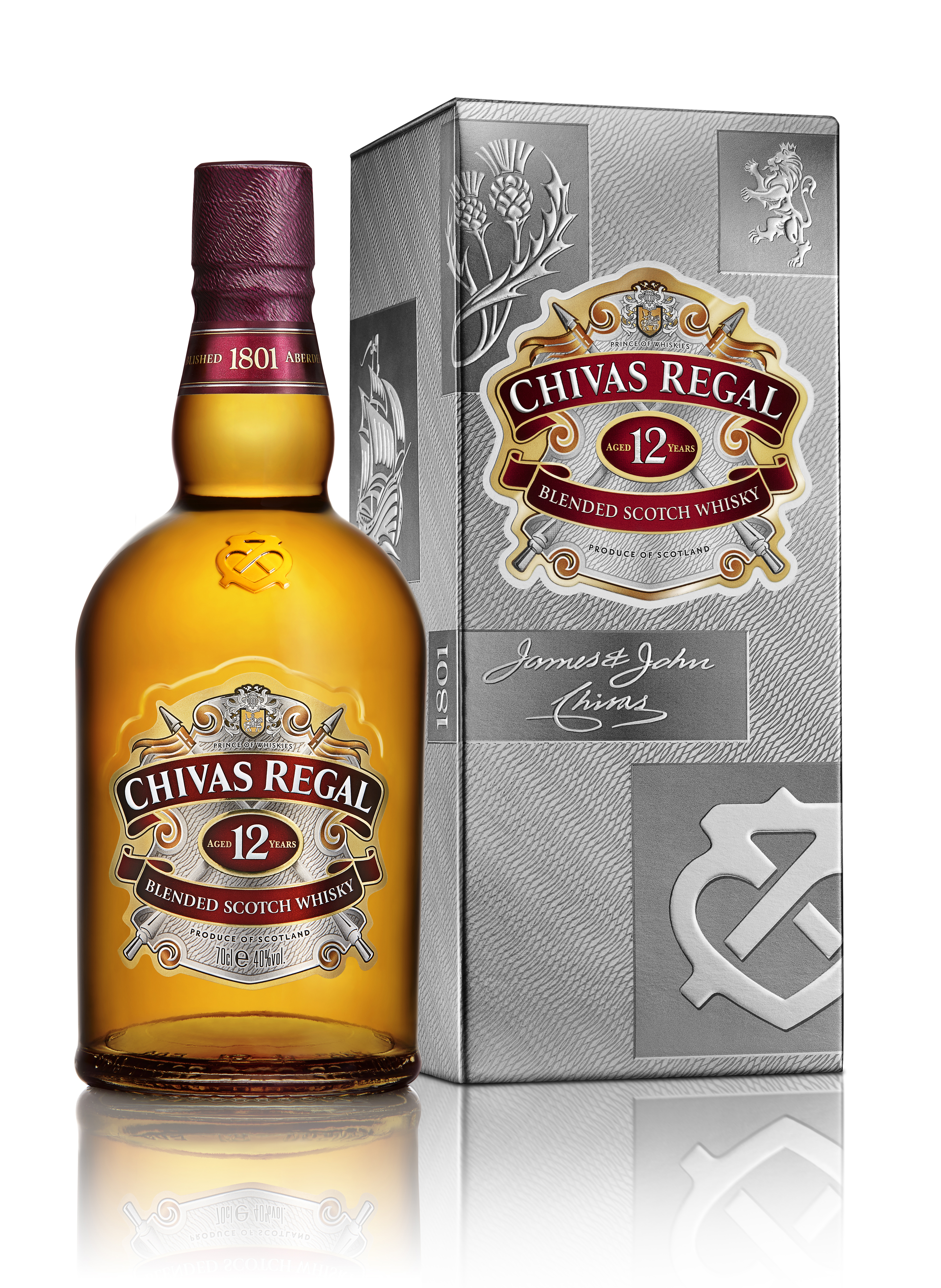
- Type: Scotch whisky
- Manufacturer: Chivas Brothers (Pernod Ricard)
- Origin: Scotland
- Introduced: 1909
- Alcohol by volume: 40%
- Variants: 12 year old, 15 years old, 18 years old, 25 years old
- Related products: Royal Salute whisky
- Website: Chivas Regal

Chivas Regal (/ˈʃɪvəs/) is a blended Scotch whisky produced by the Chivas Brothers subsidiary of Pernod Ricard in Scotland.

== History ==
Chivas Regal was created in 1909 by Chivas Brothers Master Blender Charles Stewart Howard as a 25-year-old luxury whisky.

1939 saw the debut and continued success of Chivas Regal 12-year-old Blended Scotch in the US, at what was to become a global standard proof value of 75 degrees, i.e., 42.8% ABV. (The Americans mark it as 86 proof as they double the ABV to arrive at proof value.) Henceforth, quality, age (generally 12 years), cost (high), popularity (sales) and demography (high-end) would define a "premium" Scotch Whisky.

In 1997, the Chivas Regal range was expanded with the launch of much older whiskies, such as the Chivas Regal 18 Years Old, and in 2007 the Chivas Regal 25 Years Old. Other expressions followed, like the Chivas Regal Mizunara in 2014, Chivas Regal The Icon in 2015 and the Chivas Regal XV in 2018.

In 2001, Pernod Ricard acquired Chivas Brothers. Its sales grew by 61% between 2002 and 2008. In global terms, Chivas Regal recorded volume sales of 4.9 million nine-litre cases in 2012 and 2013, but sales decreased to 4.4 million cases in 2015. It has been the world's fourth-best-selling Scotch whisky since 2016. Chivas Regal has been the market-leading Scotch whisky aged 12 years and older in Europe and Asia Pacific.

== Product line ==
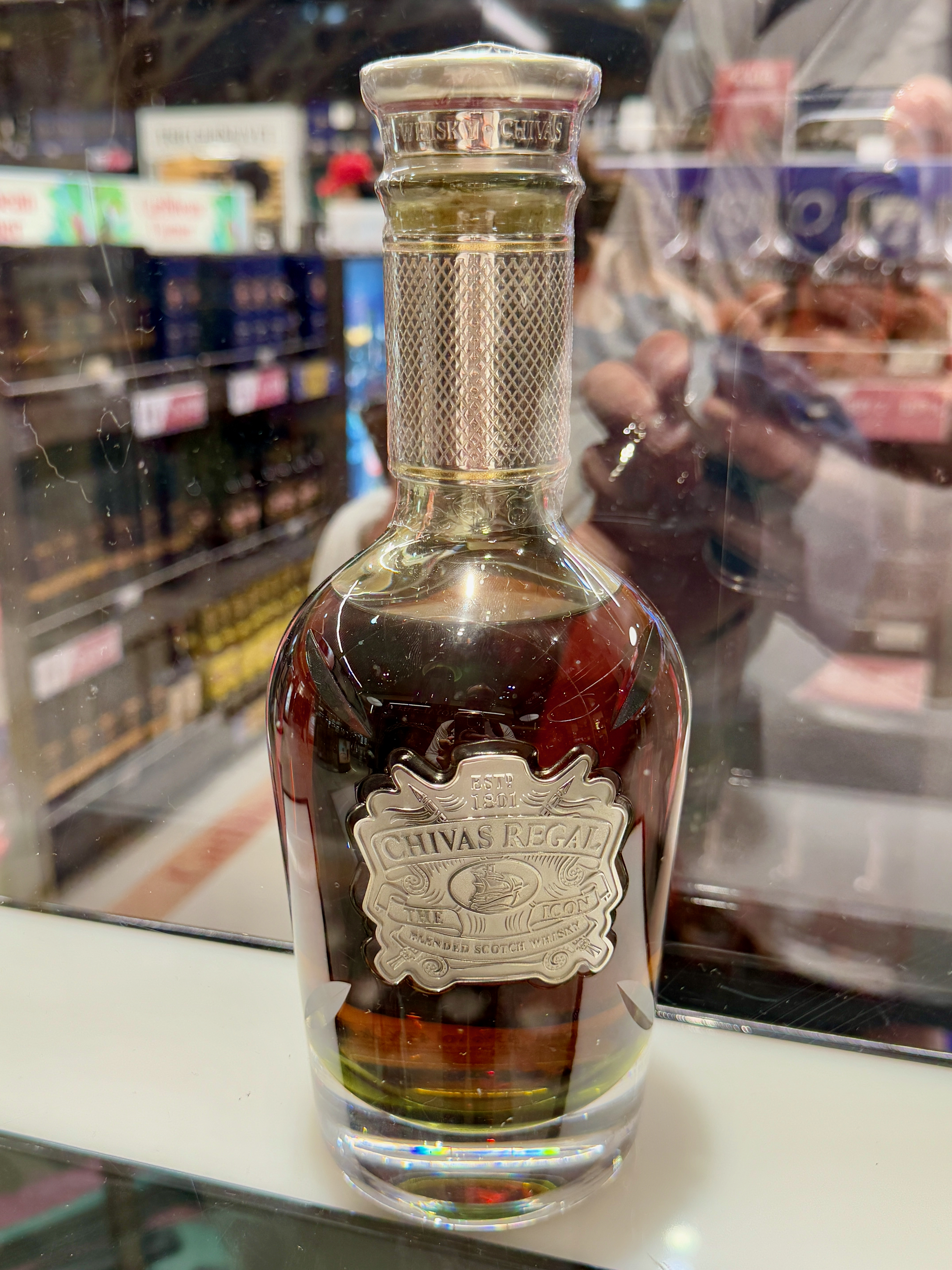
Chivas Regal The Icon

- Chivas Regal 12 Years Old: blended from whiskies matured for at least 12 years.
- Chivas Regal Extra: a blend with a higher proportion of sherry casks.
- Chivas Regal Extra 13: blended from whiskies matured for at least 13 years.
- Chivas Regal 18 Years Old: blended from whiskies matured for at least 18 years.
- Chivas Regal 25 Years Old: created using whiskies aged at least 25 years and available only in limited quantities.
- The Chivas Brothers' Blend: a 12-year-old blend intended to reflect the original Chivas house style, with a predominance of Speyside malts, in particular Strathisla and Longmorn.
- Chivas Regal Ultis XX: a blended malt whisky containing no grain whisky.
- Chivas Regal Mizunara: originally released for the Japanese market in 2014. Part of the blend is matured in Mizunara oak casks. Made its debut in the US in January 2019.
- Chivas Regal The Icon: blended from whiskies matured for at least 25 years. Launched in 2015 initially as a Dubai Travel Retail exclusive. This blend is sold in a hand-blown Dartington Crystal decanter crafted from green glass.
- Chivas Regal XV: unveiled in 2018, Chivas Regal XV is a 15-year-old blended Scotch whisky which has been finished in casks that previously held Grande Champagne Cognac.

== Strathisla distillery ==
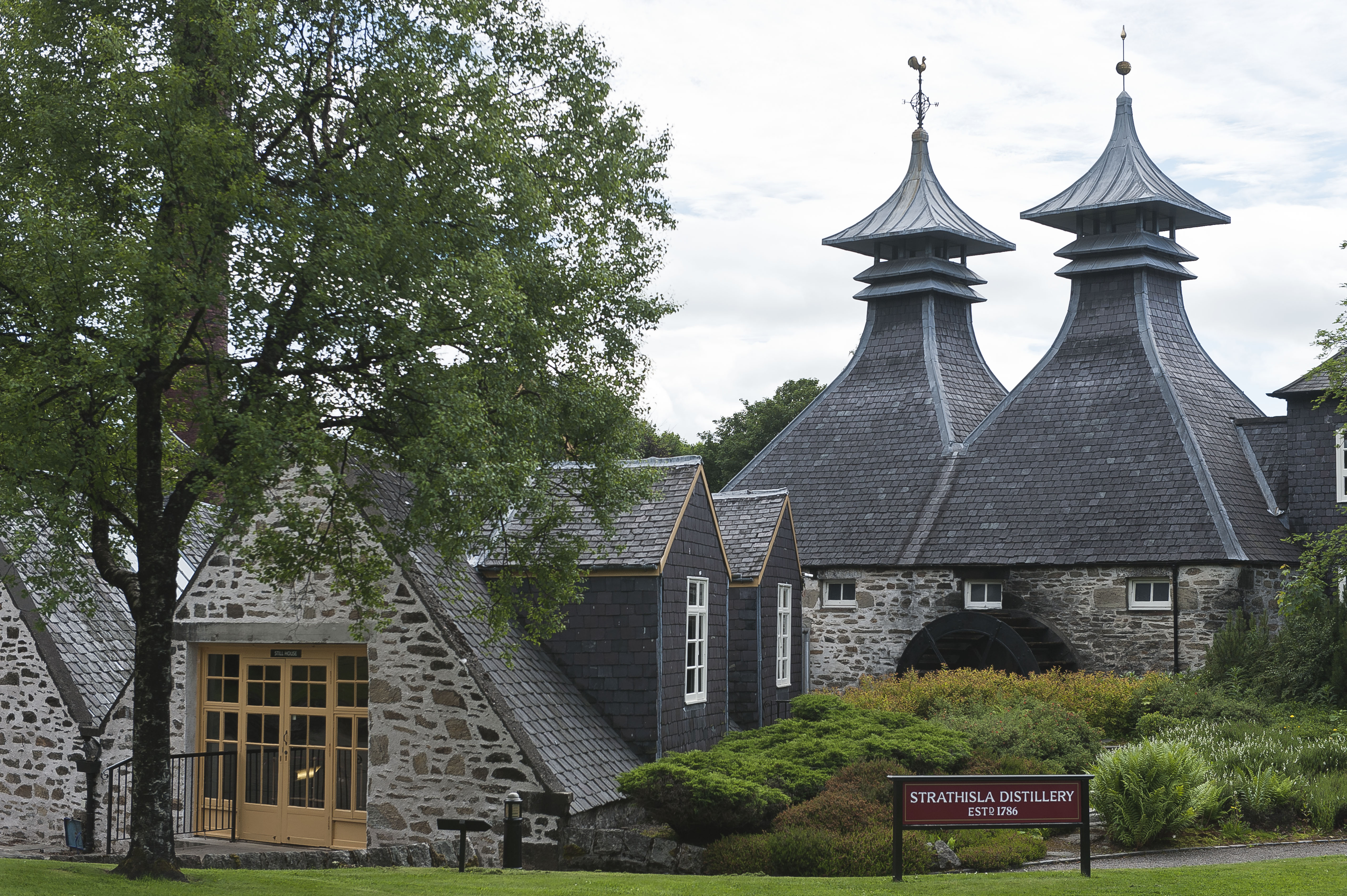
Strathisla distillery

Strathisla distillery in Speyside is home to Chivas Regal and its visitor centre. Founded in 1786 as Milton/Miltown distillery, it is the oldest working distillery in the Highlands of Scotland. The Strathisla single malt is the core malt whisky in all Chivas Regal blends, buttressed by malts from Longmorn, The Glenlivet, Allt-a-Bhainne, Miltonduff Distillery and Braes of Glenlivet (now Braeval) among other distilleries, and grain from Strathclyde distilleries in the Lowlands.

== Awards ==
Chivas Regal whiskies have received numerous international awards across major competitions including the International Spirits Challenge (ISC), the International Wine and Spirit Competition (IWSC), the San Francisco World Spirits Competition (SFWSC) and the World Whiskies Awards (WWA). Chivas Regal 18 Years Old and Chivas Regal XV were awarded in the World's Best Blended Scotch Whisky category by The Beverage Testing Institute in 2025. Chivas Regal whiskies were awarded four gold medals at The Scotch Whisky Masters (SWM) 2026 awards.

Year	Awarding Body	Product	Award	Ref.
2026	ISC	Chivas Regal 18 Years Old	Gold	
2026	ISC	Chivas Regal 25 Years Old	Gold	
2026	ISC	Chivas Regal Extra 13 Years Old Sherry Cask Selection	Gold	
2026	ISC	Chivas Regal Extra Smoky Cask Selection	Gold	
2026	ISC	Chivas Regal XV	Gold	
2026	ISC	Chivas Regal Mizunara	Silver	
2026	ISC	Chivas Regal Crystalgold	Silver	
2026	SWM	Chivas Regal Extra Smoky Cask Selection	Gold	
2026	SWM	Chivas Regal XV	Gold	
2026	SWM	Chivas Regal Extra 13 Years Old Sherry Cask Selection	Gold	
2026	SWM	Chivas Regal 25 Years Old	Gold	
2026	SWM	Chivas Regal Mizunara	Silver	
2026	SWM	Chivas Regal 18 Years Old	Silver	
2025	SFWSC	Chivas Regal 12 Years Old	Silver	
2025	SFWSC	Chivas Regal 18 Years Old	Silver	
2025	ISC	Chivas Regal 18 Years Old	Silver	
2025	ISC	Chivas Regal 18 Years Old Pauillac Wine Cask Finish	Gold	
2025	ISC	Chivas Regal 25 Years Old	Gold	
2025	ISC	Chivas Regal Extra Smoky Cask Selection	Silver	
2025	ISC	Chivas Regal Extra 13 Years Old Tequila Cask Selection	Silver	
2025	ISC	Chivas Regal Ultis XX	Silver	
2025	ISC	Chivas Regal XV	Silver	
2025	IWSC	Chivas Regal 18 Years Old	Bronze	
2025	IWSC	Chivas Regal 18 Years Old Pauillac Wine Cask Finish	Gold (95 pts)	
2025	IWSC	Chivas Regal 25 Years Old	Silver (91 pts)	
2025	IWSC	Chivas Regal Extra Smoky Cask Selection	Bronze	
2025	IWSC	Chivas Regal Extra 13 Years Old Tequila Cask Selection	Bronze	
2025	IWSC	Chivas Regal Mizunara	Bronze	
2025	IWSC	Chivas Regal Ultis XX	Bronze	
2025	IWSC	Chivas Regal XV	Bronze	
2025	WWA	Chivas Regal Ultis XX	Bronze	
2025	WWA	Chivas Regal 12 Years Old	Bronze	
2024	SFWSC	Chivas Regal XV	Silver	
2024	ISC	Chivas Regal Ultis XX	Double Gold	
2024	ISC	Chivas Regal 18 Years Old	Gold	
2024	ISC	Chivas Regal 25 Years Old	Gold	
2024	ISC	Chivas Regal XV	Gold	
2024	IWSC	Chivas Regal 18 Years Old	Silver (90 pts)	
2024	IWSC	Chivas Regal 25 Years Old	Gold (96 pts)	
2024	IWSC	Chivas Regal Ultis XX	Silver (94 pts)	
2024	IWSC	Chivas Regal XV	Bronze	
2024	WWA	Chivas Regal 18 Years Old	Category Winner	
2024	WWA	Chivas Regal 18 Years Old	Gold	
2024	WWA	Chivas Regal 12 Years Old	Silver	
2024	WWA	Chivas Regal Ultis XX	Silver	
2023	ISC	Chivas Regal 12 Years Old	Gold	
2023	ISC	Chivas Regal XV	Silver	
2023	ISC	Chivas Regal 18 Years Old	Gold	
2023	ISC	Chivas Regal Ultis XX	Trophy	
2023	ISC	Chivas Regal 25 Years Old	Gold	
2023	ISC	Chivas Regal Mizunara	Gold	
2023	IWSC	Chivas Regal 12 Years Old	Bronze	
2023	IWSC	Chivas Regal 18 Years Old	Silver (93 pts)	
2023	IWSC	Chivas Regal Extra 13 Years Old Bourbon Cask Selection	Silver (93 pts)	
2023	IWSC	Chivas Regal Extra 13 Years Old Rum Cask Selection	Bronze	
2023	IWSC	Chivas Regal Extra 13 Years Old Tequila Cask Selection	Silver (91 pts)	
2023	IWSC	Chivas Regal Mizunara	Silver (92 pts)	
2023	IWSC	Chivas Regal Ultis XX	Silver (91 pts)	
2023	IWSC	Chivas Regal XV	Bronze	
2023	WWA	Chivas Regal 12 Years Old	Bronze	
2023	WWA	Chivas Regal Extra 13 Years Old Sherry Cask Selection	Gold	
2023	WWA	Chivas Regal 18 Years Old	Silver	
2023	WWA	Chivas Regal 25 Years Old	Bronze	
2022	ISC	Chivas Regal 12 Years Old	Gold	
2022	ISC	Chivas Regal 18 Years Old	Silver	
2022	ISC	Chivas Regal Mizunara	Gold	
2022	IWSC	Chivas Regal 12 Years Old	Silver (92 pts)	
2022	IWSC	Chivas Regal Extra 13 Years Old Bourbon Cask Selection	Gold (95 pts)	
2022	IWSC	Chivas Regal Extra 13 Years Old Rum Cask Selection	Silver (93 pts)	
2022	IWSC	Chivas Regal Extra 13 Years Old Tequila Cask Selection	Silver (93 pts)	
2022	IWSC	Chivas Regal 18 Years Old	Silver (94 pts)	
2021	ISC	Chivas Regal Ultis XX	Double Gold	
2021	ISC	Chivas Regal Mizunara	Gold	
2021	ISC	Chivas Regal 12 Years Old	Gold	
2021	ISC	Chivas Regal XV	Gold	
2021	ISC	Chivas Regal 18 Years Old	Gold	
2021	IWSC	Chivas Regal 12 Years Old	Silver (92 pts)	
2021	IWSC	Chivas Regal 18 Years Old	Silver (94 pts)	
2021	IWSC	Chivas Regal Extra 13 Years Old Rye Cask Selection	Silver (92 pts)	
2021	IWSC	Chivas Regal Extra 13 Years Old Sherry Cask Selection	Gold (95 pts)	
2021	IWSC	Chivas Regal Extra 13 Years Old Rum Cask Selection	Silver (92 pts)	
2021	IWSC	Chivas Regal XV	Gold (95 pts)	
2021	WWA	Chivas Regal Ultis XX	World's Best Blended Malt	
2021	WWA	Chivas Regal 18 Years Old	Silver	
2021	WWA	Chivas Regal Extra 13 Years Old Rye Cask Selection	Bronze	
2021	WWA	Chivas Regal Range - Chivas Regal 18 Years Old, Chivas Regal Ultis XX and Chivas Regal Extra	Bronze	
2020	ISC	Chivas Regal Ultis XX	Trophy	
2020	ISC	Chivas Regal Mizunara	Gold	
2020	ISC	Chivas Regal 12 Years Old	Gold	
2020	ISC	Chivas Regal XV	Gold	
2020	ISC	Chivas Regal 18 Years Old	Gold	
2020	IWSC	Chivas Regal 12 Years Old	Gold (95 pts)	
2020	IWSC	Chivas Regal 18 Years Old	Silver (93 pts)	
2020	IWSC	Chivas Regal XV	Silver (92 pts)	
2020	WWA	Chivas Regal 18 Years Old	Silver	
2019	IWSC	Chivas Regal 18 Years Old Blue Signature	Gold (97 pts)	
2019	IWSC	Chivas Regal Extra	Gold (95 pts)	
2018	ISC	Chivas Regal Extra	Silver	
2018	IWSC	Chivas Regal 12 Years Old	Silver Outstanding	
2018	IWSC	Chivas Regal 18 Years Old	Silver Outstanding	
2018	IWSC	Chivas Regal Extra	Silver	
2018	IWSC	Chivas Regal Ultis XX	Bronze	
2017	ISC	Chivas Regal Extra	Silver	
2017	ISC	Chivas Regal 25 Years Old	Silver	
2017	ISC	Chivas Regal 12 Years Old	Silver	
2017	ISC	Chivas Regal 18 Years Old	Silver	
2017	IWSC	Chivas Regal 12 Years Old	Silver Outstanding	
2017	IWSC	Chivas Regal 18 Years Old	Silver Outstanding	
2017	IWSC	Chivas Regal 25 Years Old	Silver Outstanding	
2017	IWSC	Chivas Regal Extra	Silver Outstanding	
2017	IWSC	Chivas Regal Ultis XX	Silver Outstanding	
2016	SFWSC	Chivas Regal 25 Years Old	Double Gold + Best Blended Scotch	
2016	SFWSC	Chivas Regal 18 Years Old	Gold	
2016	ISC	Chivas Regal 25 Years Old	Gold	
2016	ISC	Chivas Regal Extra	Silver	
2016	ISC	Chivas Regal The Icon	Silver	
2016	IWSC	Chivas Regal 25 Years Old	Gold	
2016	IWSC	Chivas Regal Extra	Gold	
2015	ISC	Chivas Regal Extra	Silver	
2015	IWSC	Chivas Regal 12 Years Old	Gold	
2015	IWSC	Chivas Regal 18 Years Old	Gold Outstanding	
2015	IWSC	Chivas Regal 25 Years Old	Gold Outstanding	
2015	IWSC	Chivas Regal Extra	Silver	
2014	IWSC	Chivas Regal 12 Years Old	Silver Outstanding	
2014	IWSC	Chivas Regal 18 Years Old	Gold Outstanding	
2013	ISC	Chivas Regal 12 Years Old	Silver	
2013	ISC	Chivas Regal 18 Years Old	Trophy	
2012	ISC	Chivas Regal 12 Years Old	Silver	
2011	ISC	Chivas Regal 12 Years Old	Silver	
2011	ISC	Chivas Regal 18 Years Old	Silver	
2010	ISC	Chivas Regal 12 Years Old	Silver	
2010	ISC	Chivas Regal 18 Years Old	Silver	
2010	ISC	Chivas Regal 12 Years Old - Christian Lacroix Limited Edition	Commended	
2009	ISC	Chivas Regal 12 Years Old	Bronze	
2009	ISC	Chivas Regal 18 Years Old	Gold	
2008	ISC	Chivas Regal 18 Years Old	Silver	
2007	ISC	Chivas Regal 18 Years Old	Bronze	

== In popular culture ==
- In the 1973 film The Exorcist, the character Father Dyer brings this whisky for Father Karras to drink after the death of his mother. They share it and he remarks: "Where'd you get the money for the Chivas Regal, the poor box?"
- Frank Sinatra would often request to have a bottle of Chivas Regal handy in his dressing room during tours. Later, his 1990 "Diamond Jubilee" tour was sponsored by Chivas Regal.
- It was a favourite whisky of the journalist and novelist Hunter S Thompson.
- Tom Waits mentions Chivas Regal in the song "Downtown" on the 1980 album Heartattack and Vine.
- In the 1975 film The Prisoner of Second Avenue, Jack Lemmon orders a bottle of Chivas Regal in a liquor store after having his apartment robbed.
- In Only Fools And Horses Series 2, episode 3, "A Losing Streak", first broadcast in 1982, Delboy asks for a 'Large Chivas Regal' at the bar to try and impress Boycie.
- In 1982 Charlene and Stevie Wonder released "Used To Be", a duet containing a reference to Chivas Regal.
- In Risky Business (1983) Joel Goodson (played by Tom Cruise) pours a glass of Chivas Regal and Coca-Cola after returning home from dropping his parents off at the airport.
- The Beastie Boys song "Brass Monkey", released in 1987, includes the lyric "we don't mind Chivas".
- The characters in Charles Willeford's 1987 novel The Shark-Infested Custard favor, and lament the expense of, Chivas Regal throughout the book.
- In Working Girl, from 1988, savvy New York City receptionist Tess McGill played by Melanie Griffith orders a "Chivas" during an engagement party for her friend Cynthia (Joan Cusack), immediately prior to a proposal from her boyfriend Mick Dugan played by Alec Baldwin.
- In the 1993 film Mrs. Doubtfire, Daniel and Jonathan drink shots of Chivas during their business dinner at Bridges.
- El DeBarge mentions Chivas Regal in the song "Medley for a "V" (The Pussy Medley)" on DJ Quik's 1998 album Rhythm-al-ism.
- Kelly Clarkson's 2007 album My December includes a hidden track entitled "Chivas". The track is about an ex she ran into at a bar while drinking Chivas.
- In the Mad Men season 6 episode, "The Better Half", Ted Chaough compares Fleishchmann's margarine to Chivas Regal (because it's a relatively expensive brand of margarine), while Don Draper compares it to Budweiser (because he compares margarine to butter).
- In the American Dad! season 6 episode, "Spring Break-Up", Roger (as "Scotch Bingington") invites Spring Breakers to party at the Smith household. As the self-proclaimed "King of Spring Break," he has a staff that dispenses Chivas Regal.
- In the House of Cards season 3 episode "Chapter 29", First Lady Claire Underwood orders "Two Chivas, neat" during a scene in the White House.
- British rapper M.I.A. namedrops Chivas Regal in her song "Teqkilla". At the time, M.I.A.'s fiancé was Benjamin Bronfman, who belonged to the family that owned Seagrams.

== Sponsorships and partnerships ==
=== 2021 - 2025 ===
==== Gaurav Gupta ====
In October 2025, Chivas Regal announced a global partnership with Indian couturier Gaurav Gupta resulting in limited-edition bottle designs for Chivas Regal XV and Chivas Regal 12 Years Old. The collaboration, launched to coincide with Diwali and the festive season, combined Chivas Regal's “I Rise, We Rise” ethos with Gupta's “future primitive” aesthetic.

The Chivas Regal XV x Gaurav Gupta edition features a design incorporating gold tones and Indian motifs. The Chivas Regal 12 Years Old x Gaurav Gupta edition features a silver aesthetic with a lighter, refined and ethereal design. Gaurav Gupta designed the bottles with three unique characters: the Winged Panther symbolizing freedom and courage, the Serpent representing infinite possibility, and the Third-Eye Sun symbolizing wisdom and clarity.

The limited-edition designs reflect Gaurav Gupta's signature sculptural aesthetic. His creations have been featured on major red carpets including the Academy Awards (commonly known as the Oscars), the Emmy Awards, the Grammy Awards and the Cannes Film Festival, and have been worn by international and Indian celebrities such as Aishwarya Rai Bachchan, Beyoncé, Cardi B, Deepika Padukone, Fan Bingbing, Lizzo, Maluma and Megan Thee Stallion.

The Chivas Regal XV x Gaurav Gupta limited edition was exclusively available in Global Travel Retail (GTR), while the Chivas Regal 12 Years Old x Gaurav Gupta limited edition was available at select luxury retailers.

==== Charles Leclerc and Chivas Regal Crystalgold ====
In March 2025, Chivas Regal announced a multi-year partnership with Charles Leclerc, Scuderia Ferrari HP’s leading driver and Formula 1 driver, appointing him as a Global Brand Ambassador.

As part of this partnership, Charles Leclerc—a self-taught pianist and composer—and Chivas Regal hosted an exclusive, one-night-only pop-up piano bar named Leclerc’s in Melbourne on 11 March 2025, ahead of the 2025 Formula 1 season opener. VIP guests and selected fans enjoyed a special appearance by Leclerc with music and bespoke Chivas Regal x Charles Leclerc whisky cocktails. Nick Blacknell, Global Marketing Director for Chivas Regal at Chivas Brothers said, “The 88 notes of the piano draw perfect parallels with the 85 flavour notes of our iconic Chivas 18 Year Old expression, showing how both music and whisky blend passion with precision."

This partnership had Charles Leclerc team up with Chivas Regal and launched Chivas Regal Crystalgold, a crystal-clear whisky, ahead of the Singapore Grand Prix. To celebrate this launch, Chivas Regal Crystalgold Spritz—a cocktail blending Chivas Regal Crystalgold, citrus, elderflower, mint and champagne—was created.

In a 2024 photoshoot, Charles Leclerc appeared in the Tifosi Tartan, a bespoke kilt hand-crafted by expert kiltmakers Kinloch Anderson. This photoshoot was part of the Tifosi Tartan campaign, which was part of Chivas Regal's partnership with Scuderia Ferrari HP.

==== Arsenal FC ====
In 2024, Chivas Regal and Arsenal FC announced a new multi-year partnership. Chivas Regal became Arsenal's first official whisky partner ahead of the 2024/25 season in support of their men's and women's teams.

To mark the start of the partnership, Chivas teamed with local Arsenal pubs, such as The Drayton Park, and served complimentary highballs before the club's 2024–25 season opener. As part of the partnership, Chivas Regal opened a new bar within Dial Square at the Emirates Stadium with exclusive Chivas Highball serves. The partnership extended beyond matchdays by taking supporters behind the scenes through exclusive content, global live experiences, community-focused experiences and responsible-drinking initiatives.

Chivas and Arsenal celebrated the first Arsenal Women's game in September at the Emirates Stadium by hosting their Chivas Highball giveaway.

In 2021, Chivas launched its Regal FC digital platform, which gave fans behind-the-scenes content from players, presenters, DJs and designers.

===== Whisky-infused pies =====
In May 2025, Chivas Regal teamed up with London pie maker, Willy's Pies, to create limited-edition whisky-infused pies. These pies were served at Arsenal's last home game of the 2024–25 season at the Emirates Stadium as a tribute to the Gunners community and north London pride. At the game, the first 200 adult supporters on Club level who purchased the whisky-infused pies received a complimentary orange Chivas Regal highball. After the game, the pies were available for a short period on the Willy's Pies website with all proceeds donated to community initiatives.

The pies combined slow-braised beef brisket, caramelised shallots deglazed in Chivas Regal 12 Years Old, Isle of Mull cheddar and gravy wrapped in Willy's puff pastry and finished with gold dust.

As part of this collaboration, Chivas Regal partnered with comedian and Arsenal supporter Mo Gilligan to launch a new content series titled Pies and Punchlines, which premiered on 22 May 2025. The series featured Gilligan in light-hearted conversations with Arsenal players, including Kai Havertz, Mikel Merino and Leandro Trossard.

===== Arsenal Singapore & Hong Kong Summer Tour =====
Chivas Regal was the official whisky partner for Arsenal FC's Singapore & Hong Kong summer tour in July 2025. The partnership included branded hospitality events, signature Chivas cocktails and fan activations, including Arsenal's first-ever North London derby outside the UK at the Kai Tak Stadium in Hong Kong's in July 2025.

==== Scuderia Ferrari HP ====
In 2024, Chivas Regal became the Official Team Partner of the Formula 1 team, Scuderia Ferrari HP and started a multi-year partnership. This partnership, part of the “I Rise, We Rise” campaign, was a platform for Chivas Regal to raise awareness about the dangers of drinking and driving.

Ahead of the Abu Dhabi Grand Prix, Chivas Regal launched the Tifosi Tartan, a limited-edition kilt hand-crafted by Kinloch Anderson that combined Scottish tradition with the spirit of Scuderia Ferrari HP's fandom.

In 2025, Chivas Regal released A Tribute to the Scuderia Ferrari HP Pit Crew, a film celebrating the teamwork and dedication of Ferrari's pit-crew. The film is a choreographed dance with a poem written by George the Poet and delivered by Lewis Hamilton and Charles Leclerc.

In April 2024, Scuderia Ferrari and Hewlett-Packard (HP) announced a multi-year title partnership resulting in a new team name and brand identity Scuderia Ferrari HP across its F1 racing team, Ferrari Esports series, Scuderia Ferrari Esports team and the Scuderia Ferrari car competing in the F1 Academy female-only series. As part of this partnership, HP's products and services were integrated into Ferrari's operations on and off the track.

==== Stefflon Don ====
In 2023, Chivas Regal collaborated with UK rap artist Stefflon Don as part of its “I Rise, We Rise” campaign. The Chivas 12 x Stefflon Don Limited Edition bottle was released inspired by Stefflon Don's debut album, Island 54. The design features a tropical theme with illustrations of palm trees in blue and pink colours with rapper's signature in a neon font. The Chivas branding in seen in gold across the center of the illustration.

==== Rise Up, Glasgow ====
Rise Up, Glasgow was a mural-art project by Chivas Regal in 2022 in Glasgow as part of their “I Rise, We Rise” campaign in collaboration with artpistol Projects, a Glasgow-based art company.

Artists Rogue One (Bobby McNamara), Molly Hankinson, Michael Corr and Ellie Mills (Ellietype) painted portraits of Mark Coyle, Margaret Macdonald and Tom McGuire to celebrate the people of Glasgow who have risen up and succeeded against all odds. These murals were painted on Chivas Regal whisky tanks at its Strathclyde Distillery.

==== Lisa (Blackpink) ====
In 2022, Chivas Regal partnered with K-pop icon Lisa (Blackpink) as part of its “I Rise, We Rise” campaign, and released a Chivas Regal 18 x Lisa Limited Edition. The bottle was designed in bold blue and hot pink along with Lisa's signature in neon font. It also had a detachable 18-karat gold plated charm designed with the iconic Chivas Luckenbooth and Lisa's trademark star logo. Lisa was the first female face of the brand in Asia.

=== 2011 - 2020 ===
- In 2011, Chivas Regal sponsored The Asian Awards Outstanding Achievement in Sports Category.
- Chivas Regal signed a three-year sponsorship deal with the British Premier League football team Manchester United in August 2018. As a follow-up in October 2019, it created a special Manchester United-themed 13-year-old blended Scotch whisky in honour of former team manager Sir Alex Ferguson. Partly matured in ex-rye casks, this expression was created exclusively for the US where Manchester United reportedly has over eight million fans.
- The launch of Chivas 13 Manchester United edition follows that of a similar release in Australia in August 2019, viz., Chivas Extra 13 American Rye, a 13-year-old Australia-exclusive blend finished in ex-rye whisky casks.
- The Chivas Regal Ultis 1999 Victory Edition: a 20 year old Blended Malt bottled in 2019, using single malts of 1999 vintage from the Strathisla, Longmorn and Braeval distilleries, in tribute to Manchester United winning The Treble (the Premier League, FA Cup and the European Cup in the same season) in 1999.
