= Glengyle (disambiguation) =

Glengyle is a distillery founded in 1872 by William Mitchell.

Glengyle may also refer to:

- Glengyle, a branch of the clan Gregor

== Places ==
- Glengyle, a place at the top of Loch Katrine
- Glengyle, Queensland - Australia
  - Glengyle Airport

== Ships ==
- Ships of the British Glen Line
  - SS Glengyle (1886)
  - SS Glengyle (1914) - torpedoed by U-38 in January 1916
  - SS Glengyle (1915) - formerly Bostonian, acquired by Glen Line and renamed
  - HMS Glengyle, a Landing Ship, Infantry (Large) during the Second World War, thereafter entering merchant service as MV Glenglye
