= Scotch Whisky Regulations 2009 =

- Statutory Instrument
- Parliament of the United Kingdom
- Citation: SI 2009/2890

Dates
- Made: 26 October 2009
- Laid before Parliament: 30 October 2009
- Commencement: 23 November 2009

Other legislation
- Repeals/revokes: Scotch Whisky Act 1988; Scotch Whisky (Northern Ireland) Order 1988
- Made under: European Communities Act 1972
- Transposes: Regulation (EC) No 110/2008

Status: Amended

Text of statute as originally enacted

Revised text of statute as amended

The Scotch Whisky Regulations 2009 (SI 2009/2890) (SWR) is a statutory instrument that regulates the production, labelling, advertising and packaging of Scotch whisky. The regulations were laid before the Parliament of the United Kingdom on 30 October 2009, and came into force on 23 November 2009. They repealed the Scotch Whisky Act 1988 (c. 22) and the Scotch Whisky (Northern Ireland) Order 1988 (SI 1988/1852).

Previous legislation had only governed the way Scotch whisky was produced; the Scotch Whisky Regulations 2009 also set rules for the labelling, packaging and advertising of Scotch whisky, and required all single malt Scotch whisky to be bottled in Scotland beginning 23 November 2012.

The Scotch Whisky Association made available a PDF file on its website with the text of the regulations, along with a summarization, commentary, and explanations of certain parts of the law.

== Geographical indications ==
The regulations define five legally protected geographical indications for Scotch Whisky: two "protected localities" – Campbeltown and Islay – and three "protected regions" – Highland, Lowland and Speyside.
