= Stewart Fraser =

Stewart Fraser may refer to:

- Stewart Fraser (footballer) (born 1936), Scottish footballer
- Stewart Fraser (politician) (1895–1965), Australian politician
- Stewart Fraser (rower), British rower
- Stewart Fraser, co-founder of social networking site KILTR

== See also ==
- Stuart Fraser (disambiguation)
