= Springbank (distillery) =

Single malt whisky distillery in Scotland

Coordinates: 55°25′31.5″N 5°36′31.9″W

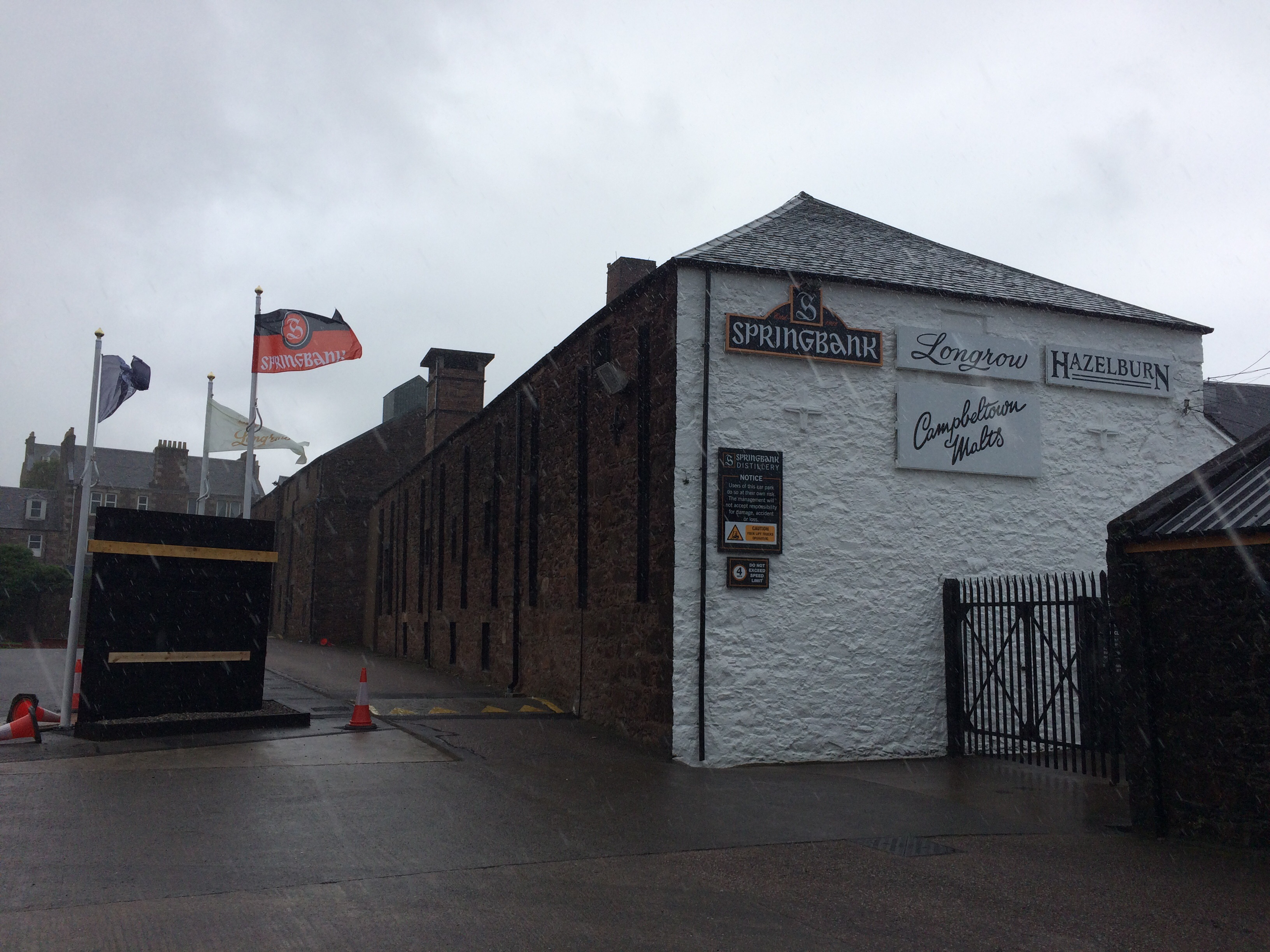

Region: Campbeltown
- Owner: J&A Mitchell & Company
- Founded: 1828
- Status: Operational
- Water source: Crosshill Loch
- No. of stills: 1 wash still (10,000 L); 2 spirit still (6,000 L)
- Capacity: 750,000 litres yearly

Springbank
- Age(s): 10-year-old 12-year-old (cask strength); 15-year-old 18-year-old 21-year-old
- Cask type(s): Bourbon; Sherry; Wine; Rum; Calvados

Longrow
- Age(s): NAS; 18-year-old
- Cask type(s): Bourbon; Sherry; Wine

Hazelburn
- Age(s): 10-year-old
- Cask type(s): Bourbon; Sherry; Wine

Springbank is a family-owned single malt whisky distillery on the Kintyre peninsula in western Scotland. It is owned by J & A Mitchell & Company, which also owns the Glengyle distillery, the oldest independent bottler, William Cadenheads, and several blended scotch labels.

Licensed in 1828, Springbank is one of the last surviving producers of single malt whiskies in Campbeltown, an area that once had more than thirty active distilleries. The distillery produces three types of peated and unpeated malt whisky that it bottles under three distinct brands. The majority of its distillate is bottled as a single malt, with a small percentage sold to larger blenders or ending up in one of J&A Mitchell's own blended scotch labels, such as Campbeltown Loch.

== History ==
Springbank was established by the Reid Brothers in 1828. The Reid Brothers sold the distillery in 1837 to John and William Mitchell. Later, the son of John Mitchell joined the business, which became J&A Mitchell.

The partnership of John and William Mitchell was dissolved in 1872, when John Mitchell bought the distillery for £5,055 (equivalent to £494,200 in 2025), and William Mitchell built the Glengyle distillery.

In December 1883 a storm hit Campbeltown which resulted in the collapse of the distillery chimneys. Further damage occurred during a storm in 1904, when part of the tun room roof was torn off.

After shutting down temporarily in 1926 due to the effects of the Prohibition in the United States, the distillery began operating again in 1936.

The distillery closed down in 1979 due to the poor state of the UK economy, and reopened in 1989. In 1993, it was revealed that Springbank was the supplier of miniature whisky bottles that were being sold at Balmoral Castle.

The company distilled its Hazelburn brand for the first time in 1997.

== Production ==
Springbank is the only Scottish distillery to perform every step in the whisky-making process, from malting the barley to bottling the spirit. Several distilleries malt some percentage of their barley and source the balance from an industrial malting facility, such as Port Ellen; however, Springbank maintains a traditional malting floor that provides for 100% of their distillate.

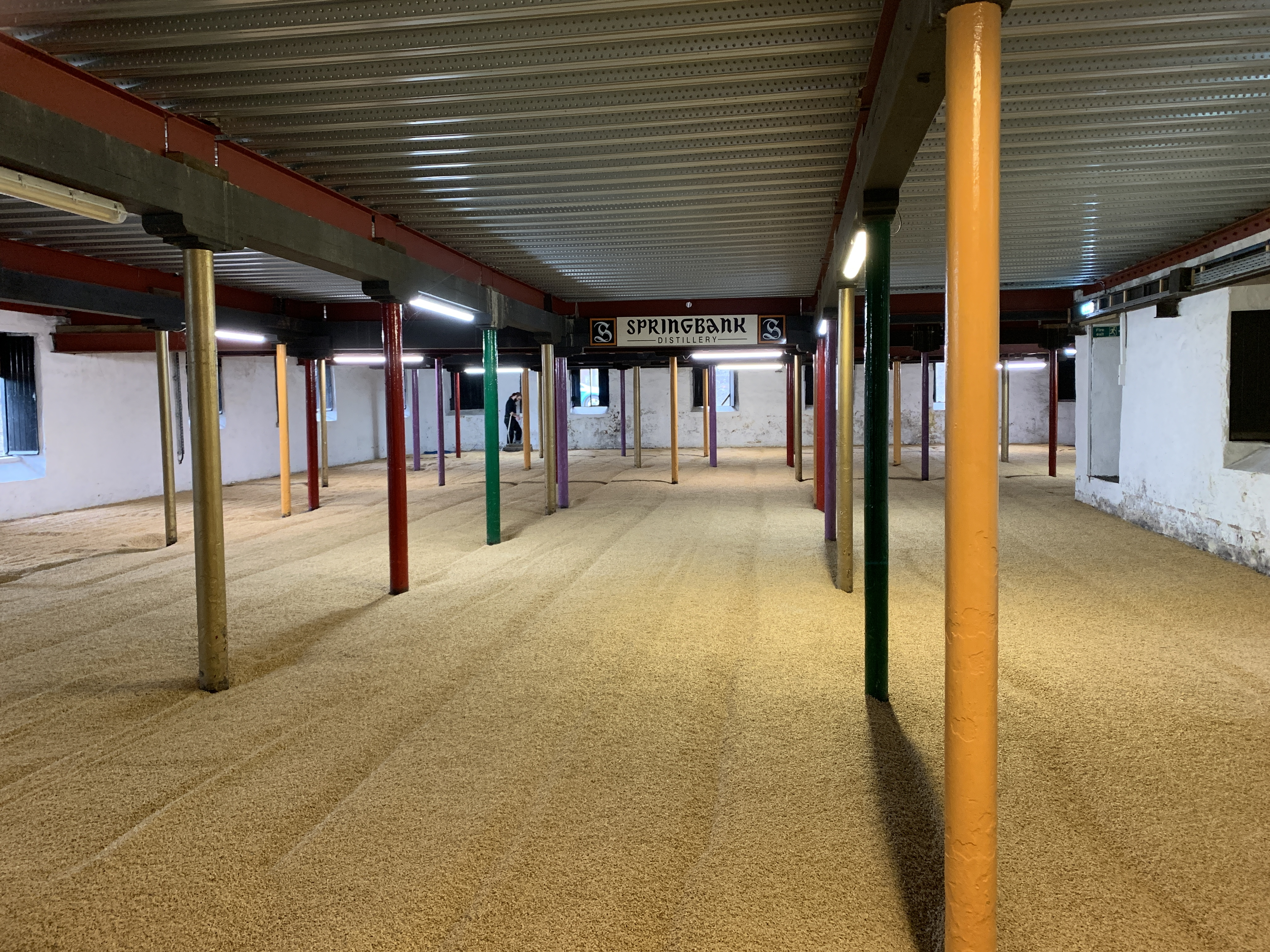
The malting floor

Springbank then dries its barley using peat sourced from Islay for various lengths of time (30 to 48 hours) to imbue different levels of the smoky flavour associated with Scottish whisky.

- Hazelburn receives 30 hours of hot air
- Longrow receives 48 hours of peat smoke
- Springbank receives 6 hours of peat smoke and 30 hours of hot air

Once dried, the barley is ground into grist, mixed with warm water in a cast-iron open-top mash tun to extract the barley sugars.

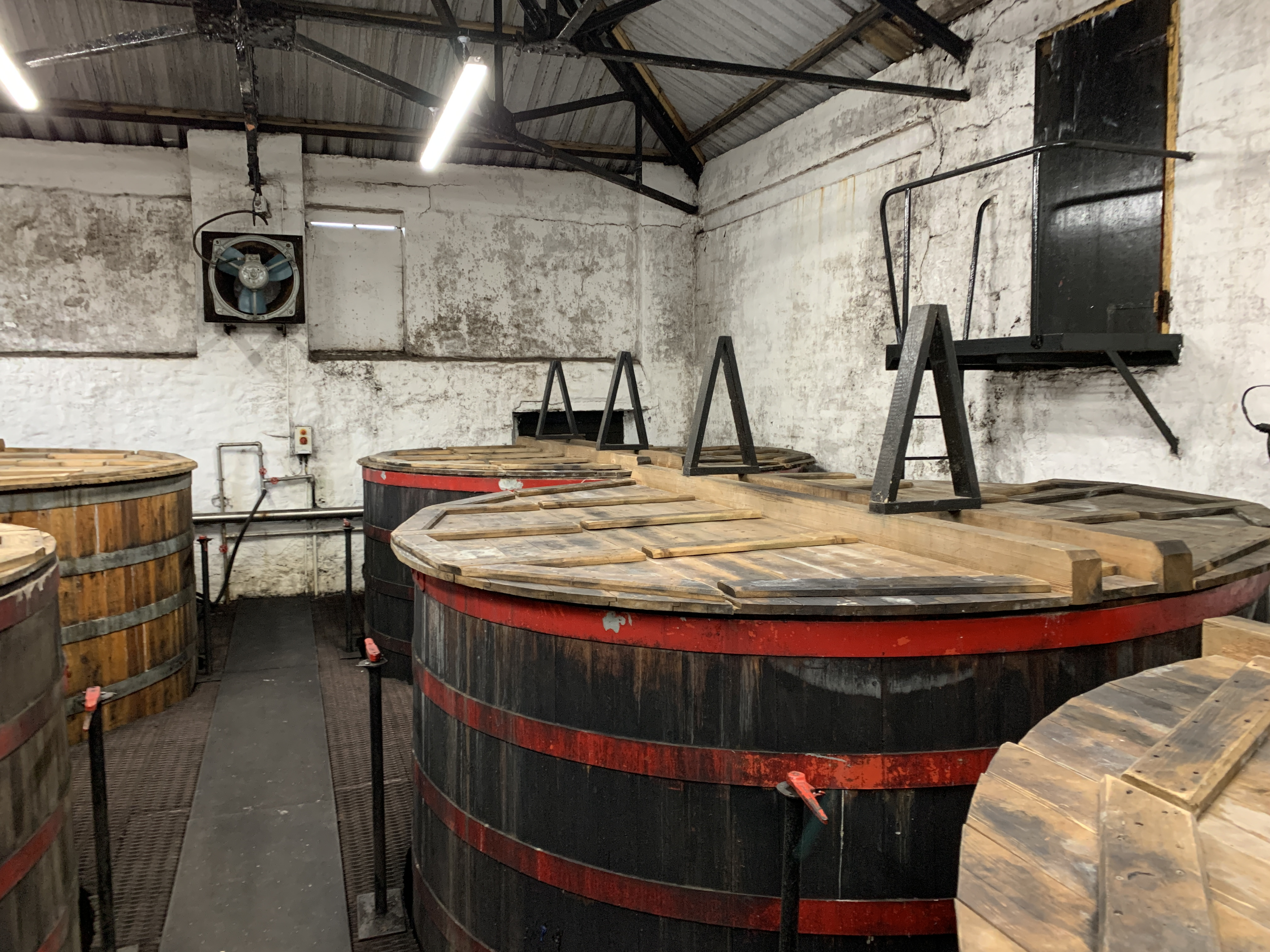
The washbacks

The wort is then cooled and pumped into six boatskin larch washbacks to ferment for 72 to 110 hours and produce what is now called 'wash'. This long fermentation period allows for the formation of esters that shape the fruity secondary characteristics that help make the identity of the final product. The alcoholic wash goes on to the stills for the distillation phase.

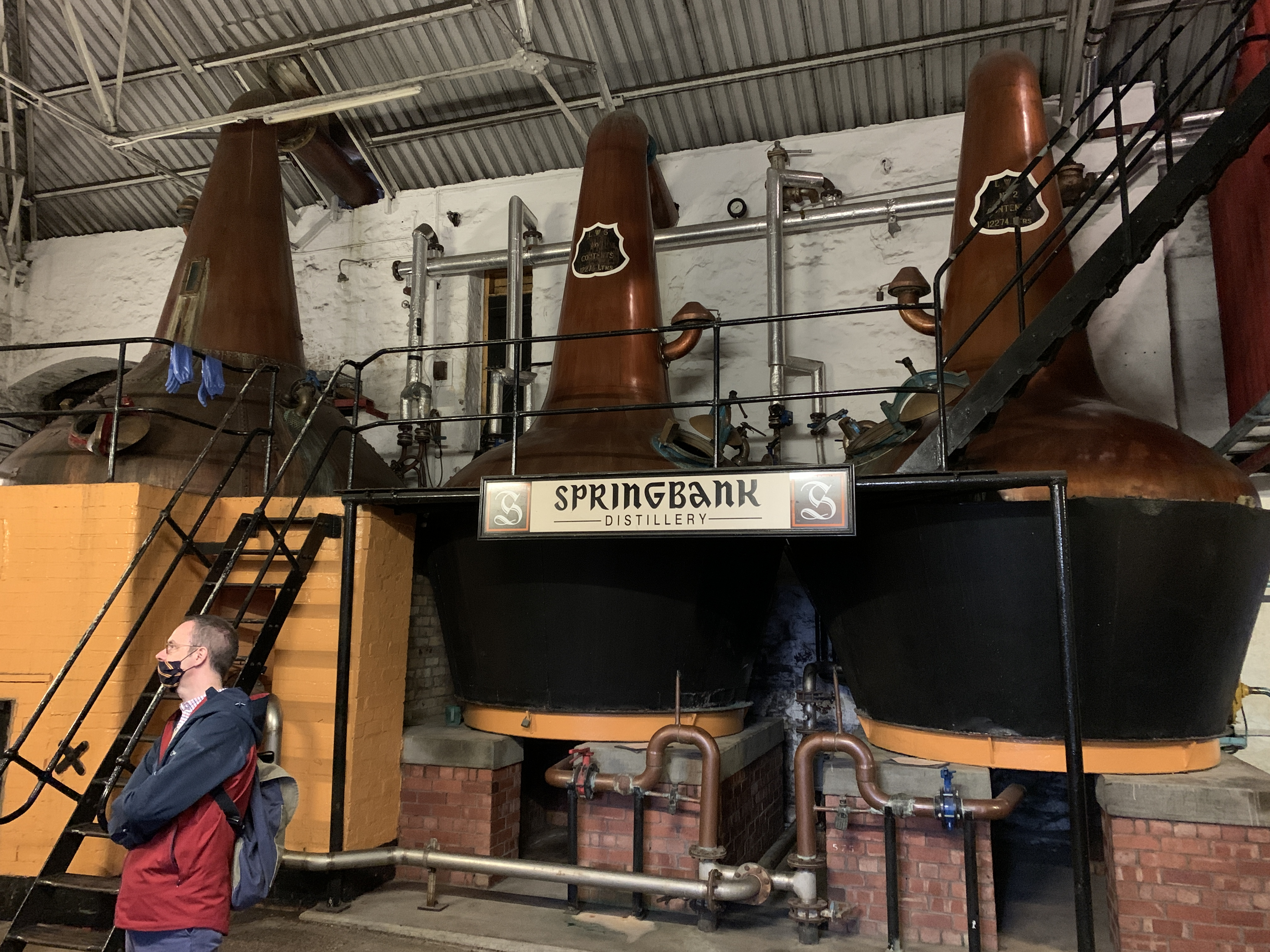
The three copper pot stills

Springbank uses three copper pot stills (one using direct-fire, the other two using steam) used in various combinations to produce its malts: Hazelburn (unpeated) is triple-distilled to produce a lighter, higher ABV end product of 74 to 76% ABV. The medium-peated Springbank is two and a half times distilled: during the distillation process some of the low wines are collected before the second distillation, and then mixed back into the feints for another distillation. This means that some parts of the spirit have been through the stills twice and some parts three times; hence, the "half" distillation. The amount of spirit that goes through the "half" time is judged by the stillman as the process takes place to ensure consistency. It emerged at around 71 to 72% ABV. The heavily peated Longrow is double-distilled leaving a heavier, smoky distillate that leaves the still at 68% ABV. The distillery employs traditional worm-tub condensers, which limit copper contact and make for a richer, oilier spirit.

The spirit is then aged primarily in ex-bourbon and ex-sherry casks, although Springbank experiments with a wide range of casks to produce secondary characteristics that accent its house style.

== Whisky variants ==
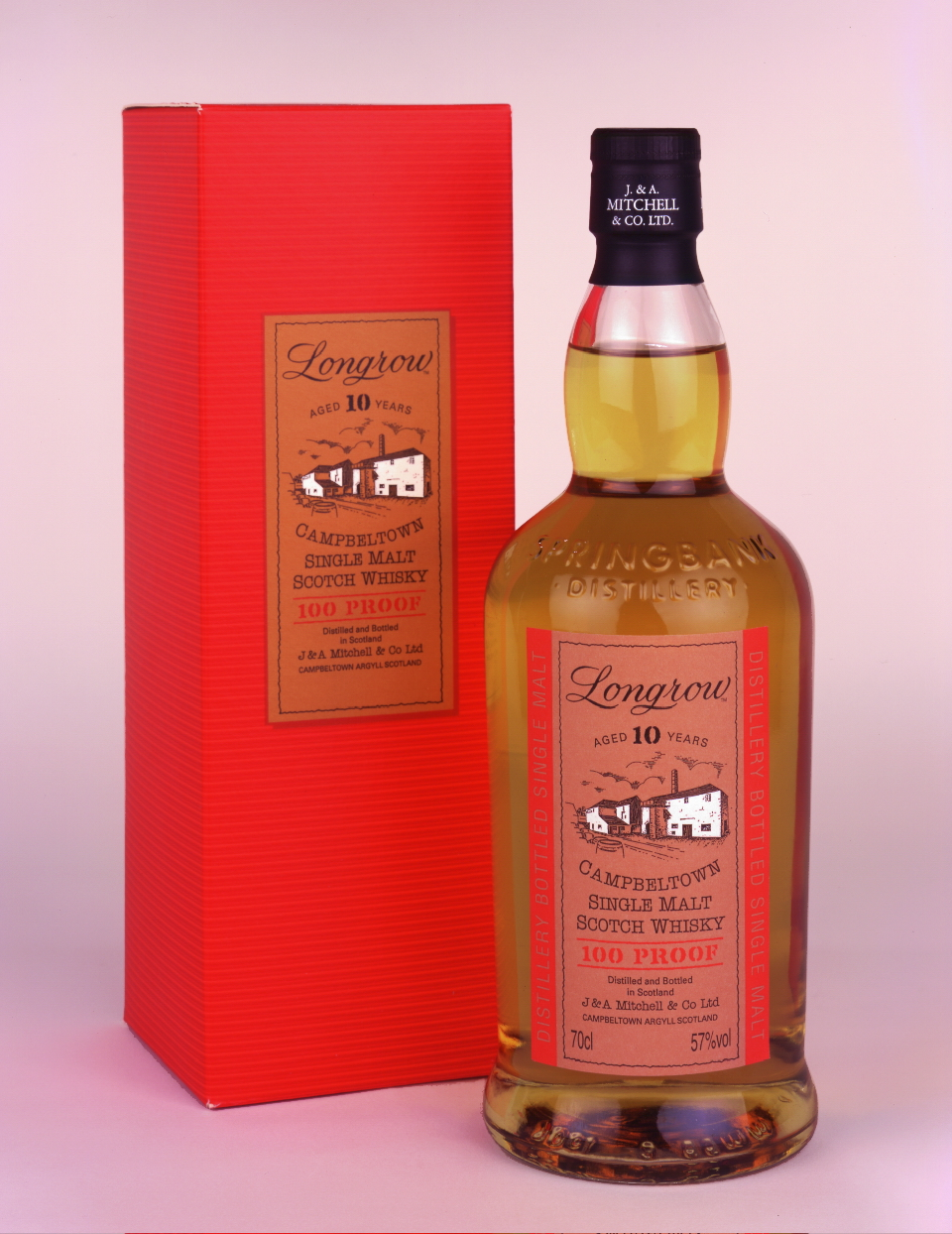
Longrow 10-year-old

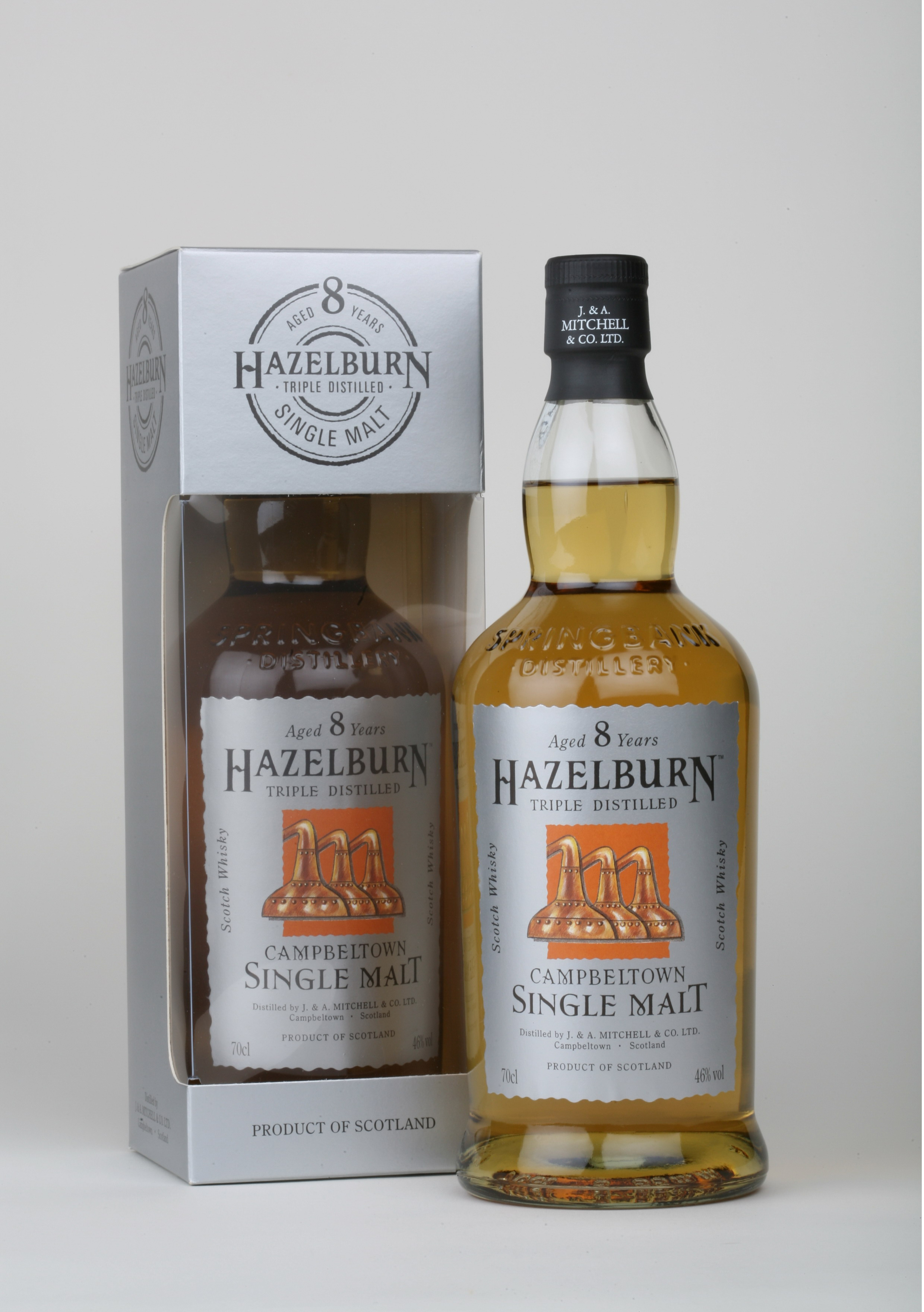
Hazelburn 8-year-old

Springbank produces three variants from its distillery by tweaking the production process at various stages. None of the malts produced at this distillery is chill-filtered, and they do not contain colourants, such as caramel E150.

- Hazelburn Single Malt, the newest variety, was first distilled in 1997 and since bottled as a 10-year-old. In 2009, a 12-year-old variety was released. Hazelburn is a triple-distilled, non-peated whisky. Hazelburn is also named after a Hazelburn, a discontinued distillery near the Springbank one.
- Longrow Single Malt is a highly peated, double-distilled whisky, named after a mothballed distillery of the same name. The standard bottling bears no age statement, with age-statement-bearing editions experimenting with different casks such as tokaji and Barolo. The Red edition (released annually) uses a different type of wine cask each year such as Pinot noir, Malbec, and Port. Longrow won Best Campbeltown Single Malt at the 2013 World Whiskies Awards.
- Springbank Single Malt is available as a 10-year-old, medium-peated and distilled two and a half times. A cask-strength 12-year-old bottling which is released annually and is slightly different each year, as well as 15-year, 18-year, and 21-year olds making up the core lines.

== Cadenhead’s Old Raj London dry gin variants ==
- Saffron Infusion; incorporating juniper, coriander seed, angelica root, lemon and orange peel, orris root, cassia bark, and almond powder.

=== Red Label ===
- Bottled at 46% ABV.

=== Blue Label ===
- Bottled at 55% ABV.

== See also ==
- Campbeltown single malts
- List of distilleries in Scotland
- List of whisky brands
