= David Edward =

Scottish lawyer and academic

The Right Honourable Sir David Edward KCMG KC FRSE

Member of the Court of Justice of the European Communities
- In office 1992–2004
- Preceded by: The Lord Slynn of Hadley
- Succeeded by: Sir Konrad Schiemann

Personal details
- Born: David Alexander Ogilvy Edward; 14 November 1934 (age 91) Perth, Scotland
- Spouse: Elizabeth McSherry
- Relations: John Ogilvy Christie Edward (father)
- Children: Anne Edward Giles Edward John Edward Dr Katherine Edward
- Education: University College, Oxford, University of Edinburgh
- Profession: Advocate
- Awards: KCMG Cruz Distinguida 1ª Cl, San Raimundo de Peñafort Officier de la Légion d'honneur Chevalier des Arts et des Lettres

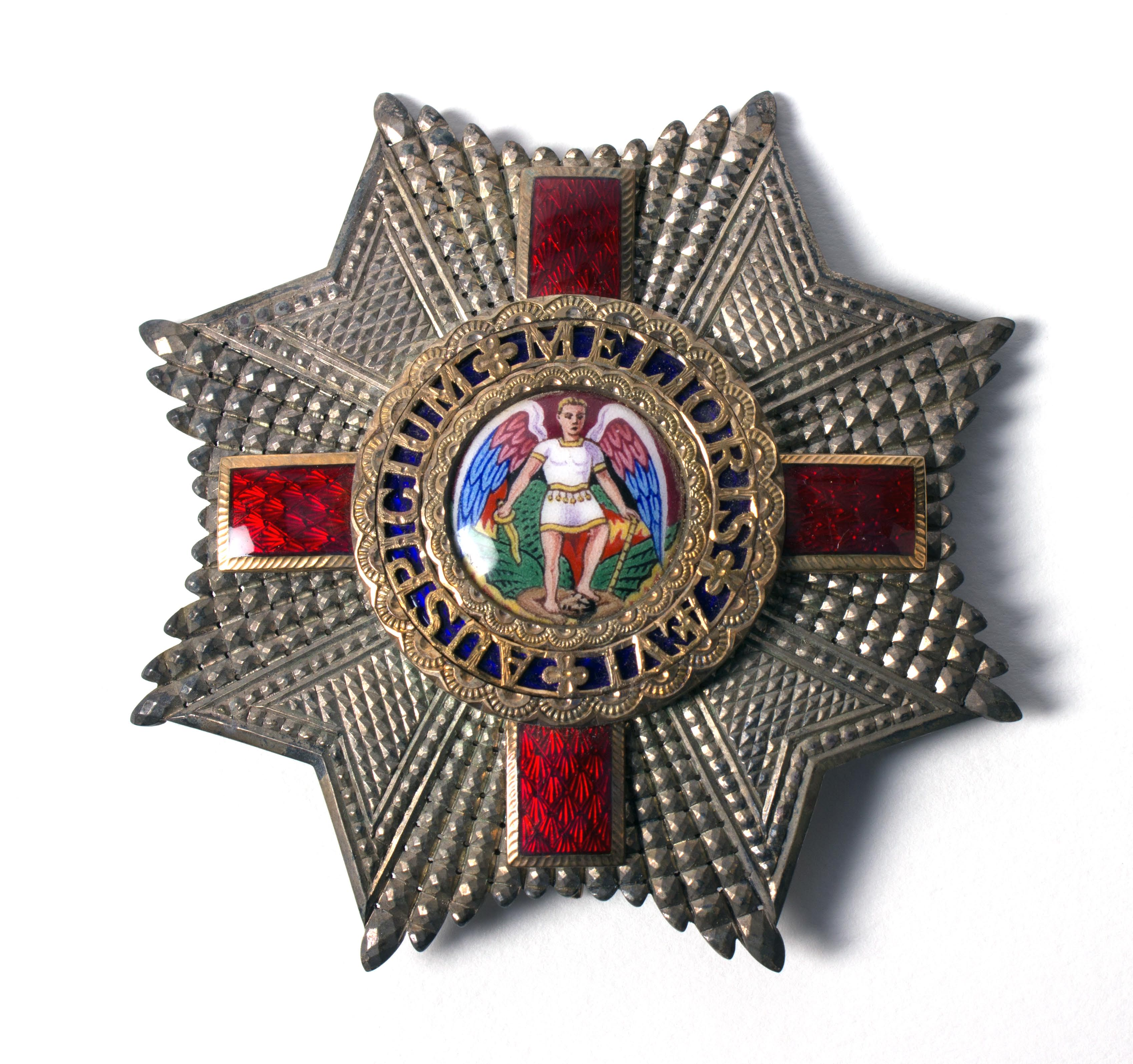
KCMG star

Sir David Alexander Ogilvy Edward KCMG PC KC FRSE (born 14 November 1934) is a Scottish lawyer and academic, and former Judge of the Court of Justice of the European Communities. Sir David is an Honorary Fellow of University College, Oxford; Honorary Professor of the University of Edinburgh and Fellow of the Royal Society of Edinburgh. He is also an Honorary Sheriff of the Sheriffdom of Tayside, Central and Fife at Perth, Scotland.

== Early life and marriage ==
Born in 1934 at Perth, Edward was educated at Perth Academy, Clifton Hall School and Sedbergh School. He then went up to read Classics at University College, Oxford, taking a break midway to become commissioned in the Royal Navy for National Service (HMS Hornet, 1956–57), and Law at the University of Edinburgh. He married Elizabeth McSherry in 1962; they have 2 daughters and 2 sons.

== Early career – advocate and academic ==
Edward was called to the Bar in 1962 and appointed Queen's Counsel in 1974. He subsequently served as Clerk and then Treasurer of the Faculty, and represented the Faculty at the Consultative Committee of the Bars and Law Societies of the European Community, of which he served as President between 1978–80.

He was Salvesen Professor of European Institutions and Director of the Europa Institute at the School of Law of the University of Edinburgh from 1985 to 1989, during which time he served on three occasions as Specialist Adviser to the House of Lords Select Committee on the European Communities.

Edward served as a Director of the Harris Tweed Authority from 1984–89.

== European Court of Justice ==
In 1989, Edward was appointed one of the inaugural Judges of the newly created European Court of First Instance, and in 1992 was appointed Judge of the European Court of Justice, a position from which he retired in 2004.

"A True European", a collection of essays for Sir David Edward, was published on his retirement, including "Tales from the Tartan Chambers".

== Retirement and later career ==
Edward sat as a temporary judge of the Court of Session in Scotland, hearing civil appeals, until 2009. He was promoted Knight Commander of the Order of St Michael and St George (KCMG) in 2004, having been appointed Companion of that Order (CMG) in the 1981 Birthday Honours, and in December 2005 was sworn of the Privy Council. He is the Chairman of the Carnegie Trust for the Universities of Scotland and was Chairman of the Scottish Council of Independent Schools from 2005 to 2010.

He is an Honorary Fellow of University College, Oxford and an Honorary Bencher of Gray's Inn. He is Professor Emeritus of the School of Law of the University of Edinburgh, and Chairman of its Europa Institute. Elected a Fellow of the Royal Society of Edinburgh, in 2005 he received the Society's Royal Gold Medal. In 2011, he was appointed as the Honorary President of the Scottish Arbitration Centre. Edward is a Member of the Panel of Arbitrators, International Centre for Settlement of Investment Disputes and member of the Centre for Effective Dispute Resolution Distinguished Panel of Third-Party Neutrals.

Edward was awarded the Distinguished Cross First Class of the Order of St. Raymond of Peñafort by the newly-restored Kingdom of Spain in 1979, and in 2012 the Republic of France appointed him Officer of the Legion of Honour (Officier de la Légion d'honneur) and Knight (Chevalier) of the Ordre des Arts et des Lettres.

Edward was a member of the Commission on Scottish Devolution chaired by Professor Sir Kenneth Calman, Chancellor of the University of Glasgow. He was a member of the UK Commission on a Bill of Rights, 2011–12.

Edward published an influential analysis of the position in European Union law if there were a vote in favour of Scottish independence in the 2014 Scottish independence referendum as well as an opinion on Scotland's position in the European Union in a 2013/14 memorial to fellow jurist, Lord Rodger of Earlsferry, and a 2014 lecture on the "Constitutional Implications of the Independence Referendum" to the Centre for Global Constitutionalism at the University of St Andrews..

On 8 March 2013, Sir David delivered the Europa Institute/UACES Lecture, at the University of Edinburgh, on "The Moral Case for Europe". Since 2016 he has spoken and written about the negative impact of UK withdrawal from the EU on legal standards, human and employment rights, and Scots law.

== See also ==
- List of members of the European Court of Justice

Orders of precedence in the United Kingdom
Preceded by David Cameron as Privy Counsellor	Gentlemen; Privy Counsellor	Succeeded by Sir George Howarth as Privy Counsellor
