= Hazelburn distillery =

Whisky distillery in Campbeltown, Scotland

Coordinates: 55.4284°N 5.6097°W

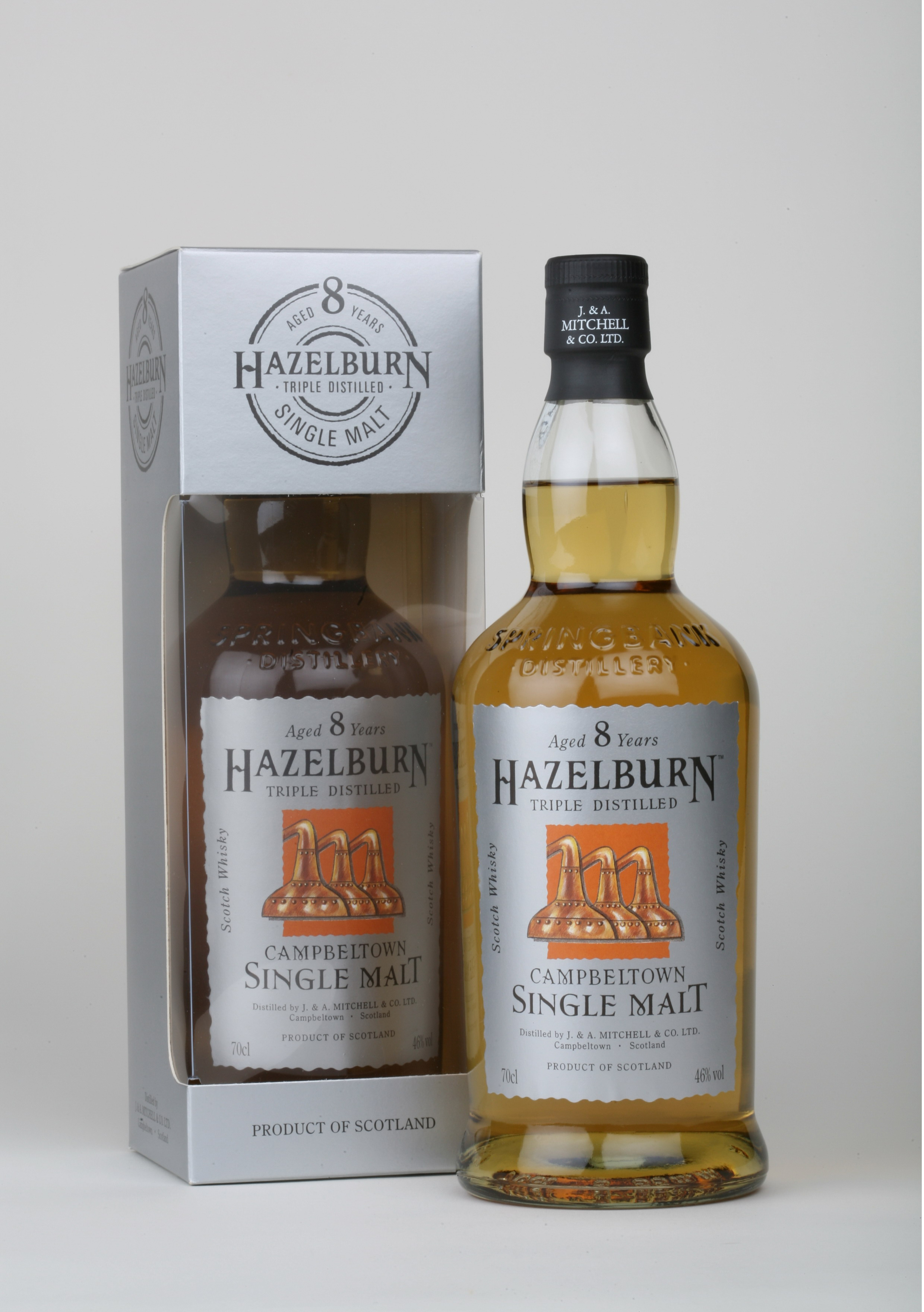

Region: Campbeltown
- Location: Campbeltown, Scotland
- Founded: 1825
- Status: Closed/demolished
- Demolished: 1926

Hazelburn distillery was Campbeltown single malt Scotch whisky distillery in Campbeltown, Scotland, which was in operation between approximately 1825 and 1925.

== History ==
Founded in 1825 by the Reid family and originally known as Rieclachan distillery. By 1871 was owned by the Greenlees brothers of Lorne Highland Whisky who also owned Dalaruan and Lagavulin but by 1881 this had become the firm of Greenlees and Colvill. Also in 1881 Captain Samuel Greenlees bought out the partnership of Daniel Greenlees and also acquired the Moy estate.

In 1886, it had 22 employees and produced 192,000 gallons of whisky per year, making it the largest distillery in the town. On 9 September 1893 Princess Helen of Waldeck and Pyrmont and family were on the Royal Yacht Victoria and Albert which arrived in Campbeltown Loch. They were given a tour of the distillery by Samuel Greenlees of Greenlees and Colvill Ltd.

In 1921 Greenlees & Colvill Ltd went into liquidation and the distillery was offered for sale. It was bought by Mitchell & Co., but shut down in 1925 and demolished in 1926. Mitchell & Co. owned two other distilleries, including Springbank Distillery.

Since 2005 Springbank Distillery bottles a whisky called Hazelburn Single Malt.

== See also ==
- List of historic whisky distilleries
