= Campbeltown single malts =

Whiskies distilled in Campbeltown

Whisky producing regions of Scotland

Campbeltown single malts are single malt Scotch whiskies distilled in the burgh of Campbeltown, on the Kintyre peninsula in Scotland. Once a major producer of whisky with as many as 30 distilleries, and claiming the title "whisky capital of the world", its production has markedly declined. Most of the distilleries have gone out of business and little trace of them remains. The reason for this decline was that the town was "churning out whisky in volume ... with little concern for quality", according to a 2018 book that covers the entire industry and its history.

By 2010 only three distilleries continued to produce whisky in Campbeltown: Springbank, Glengyle, and Glen Scotia. The Springbank distillery produces three distinct whiskies; Springbank, Hazelburn, and Longrow. Glengyle distillery has been revived by J & A Mitchell and Co Ltd., who own and operate the Springbank distillery, and its whisky is sold under the name Kilkerran to avoid confusion with the Highland blended malt named Glengyle. By 2016, Kilkerran had started bottling and selling a 12-year-old spirit, to go along with their previously released No-Age-Statement offerings.

There is a growing interest in reviving Campbeltown's historic single malt whisky industry, with two new distilleries under construction as of 2022, and another new distillery announced

== Flavours ==
A 2019 review indicated that the whisky produced here offers notes of "dried fruit, vanilla, toffee, and brine within a dry and pungent body". The Visit Scotland web site is more specific, defining Springbank malts as "robust and smoky with hints of their maritime roots", the Glen Scotia single malts as "lighter with grassy notes" and Glengyle's Kilkerran whisky as "lighter and sweeter, but with the distinctive oily and salty notes".

Modern Campbeltown single malts are typically described as having a distinct "industrial funk", said to be reminiscent of mechanical oils, creosote, vegetal matter, mushrooms, wet sacks, and mulch.

== Legal status ==
Campbeltown is a "protected locality" for Scotch Whisky distilling under UK Government legislation.

== Operational Campbeltown distilleries ==
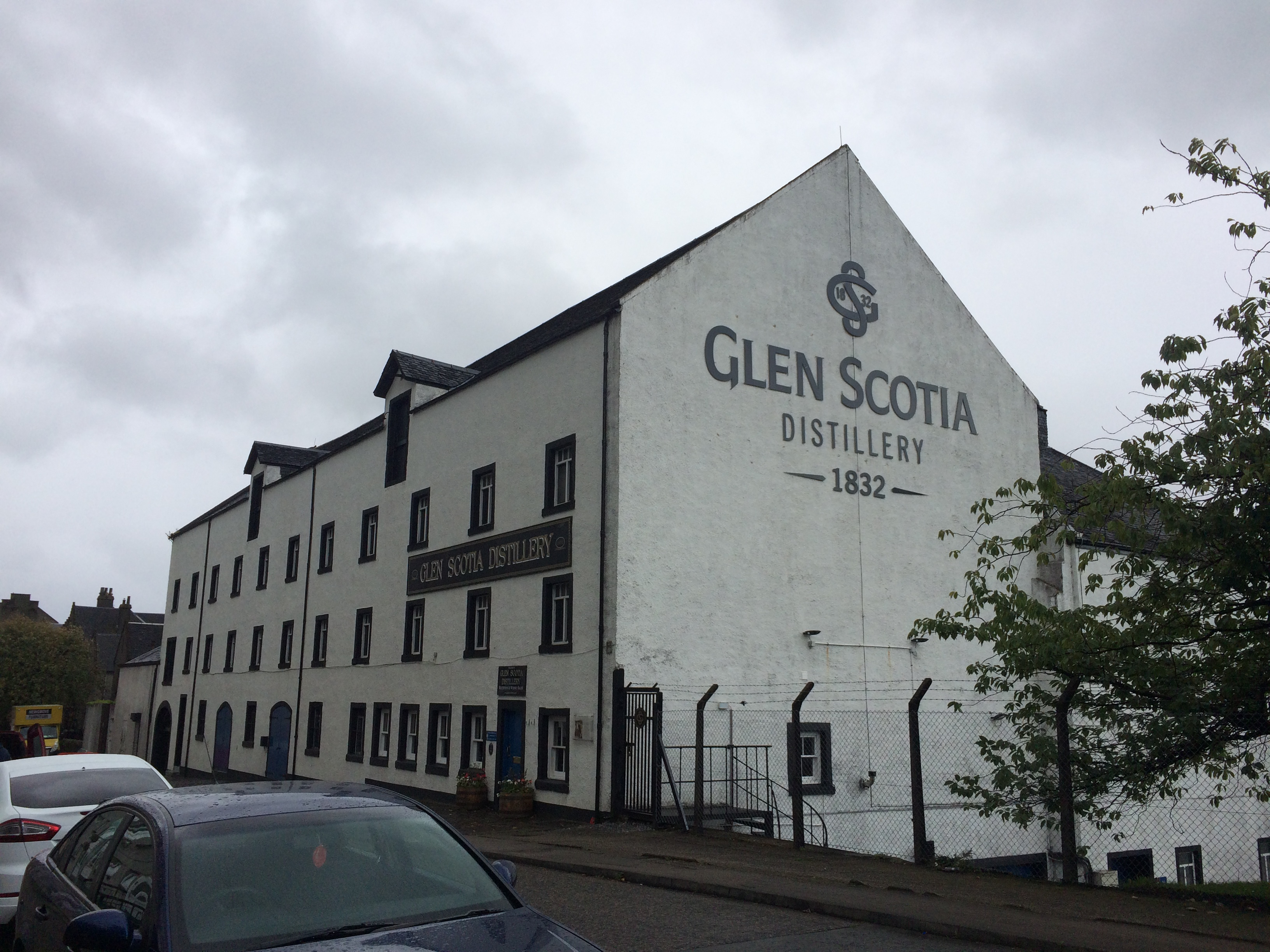
Glen Scotia

- Glen Scotia
- Glengyle
- Springbank

== Upcoming Campbeltown distilleries ==
- Machrihanish Distillery, by R&B Distillers, owners of the Isle of Raasay distillery
- Dál Riata Distillery, by Dál Riata Distillers
- Witchburn Distillery, by Brave New Spirits

== Defunct Campbeltown distilleries ==
- Albyn Distillery built for William McKersie. Some sources say it opened in 1830 but it is not shown in the 1837 Directory by Pigot and Company. On 10 March 1850, a fire broke out in the malt store which partially destroyed the roof of the still-house. In 1894, a storm at Campbeltown brought down the large chimney at the distillery. It closed in 1920 and was demolished in 1927.
- Ardlussa Distillery built in 1879 on Glebe Street for James Ferguson & Sons, owners of Jura Distillery. It is reported to have consisted of an oblong square building of three storeys extending 256 feet (78 m) along Glebe Street. The wash still was capable of charging about 3,200 imperial gallons (15,000 L) and the spirit still 1,800 imperial gallons (8,200 L). The 20 h.p. steam engine provided power for the distillery and required a chimney 85 feet (26 m) high. It was acquired in 1919 by West Highland Malt Distilleries. After they went into liquidation in 1923 it was put up for sale in 1924.

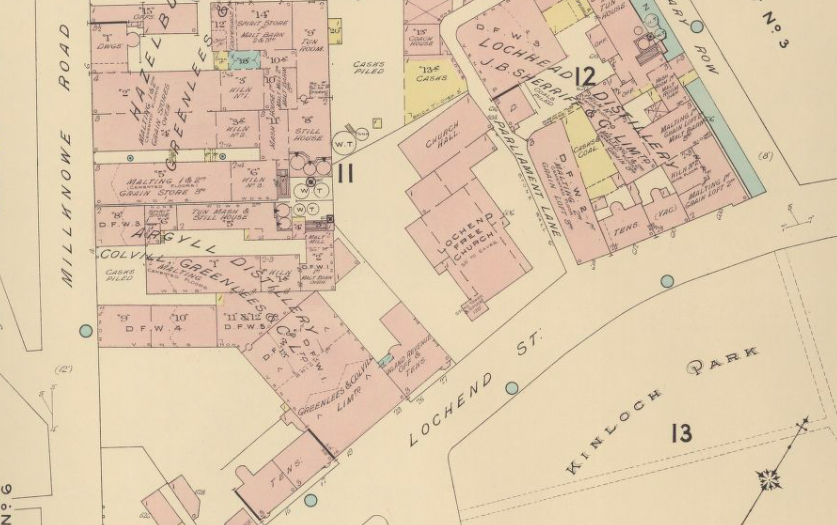
Plan of 1898 showing the Argyll Distillery and the bonded warehouse on Lochend Street

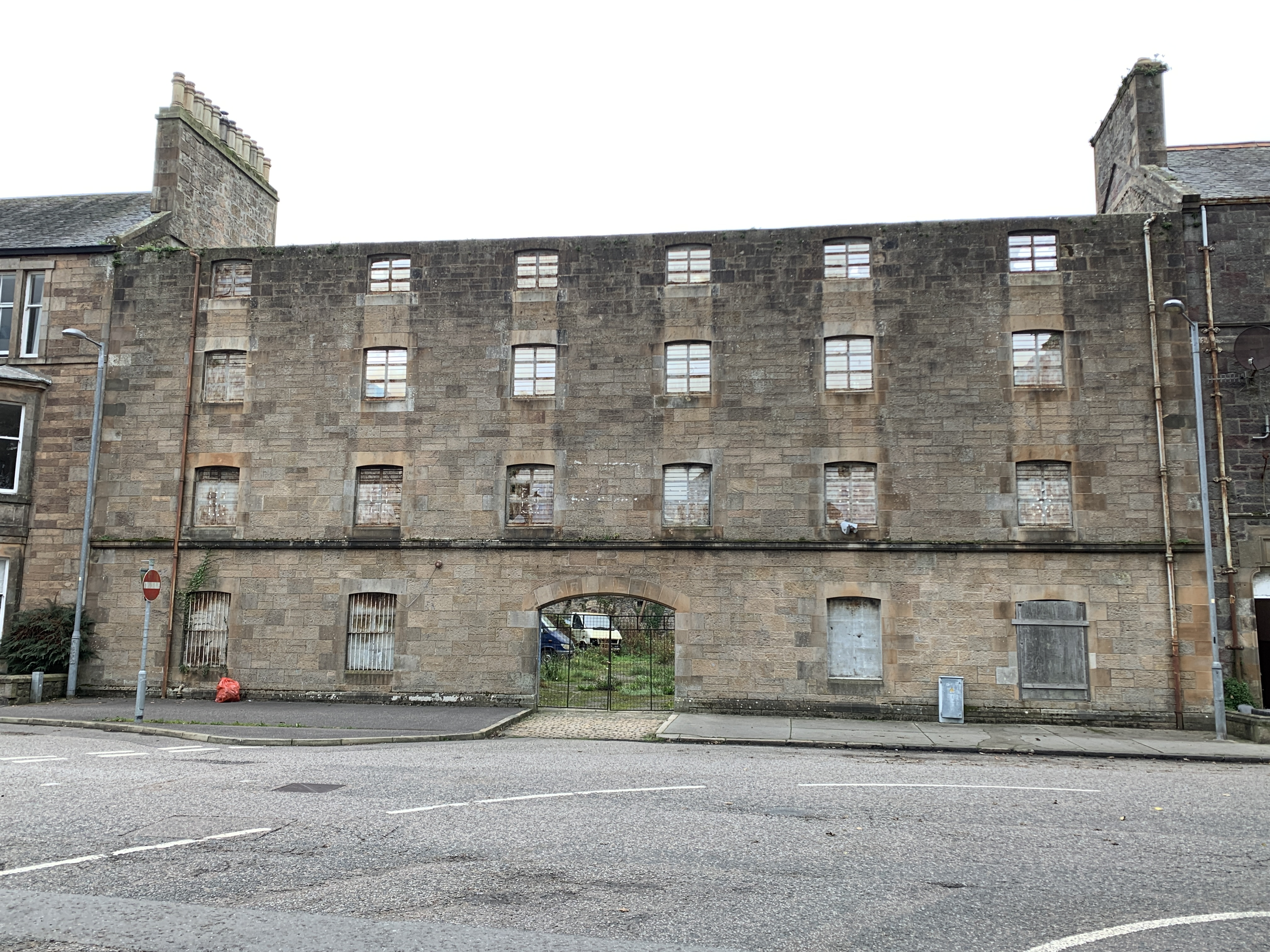
Former bonded warehouse for Argyll Distillery at 21 Lochend Street. Category B listed.

- Argyll Distillery was built in 1844 for Robert Colvill, Hugh Greenlees, and Robert Greenlees Jr., on Longrow Street. The building was sold in 1929 and subsequently converted into a garage.

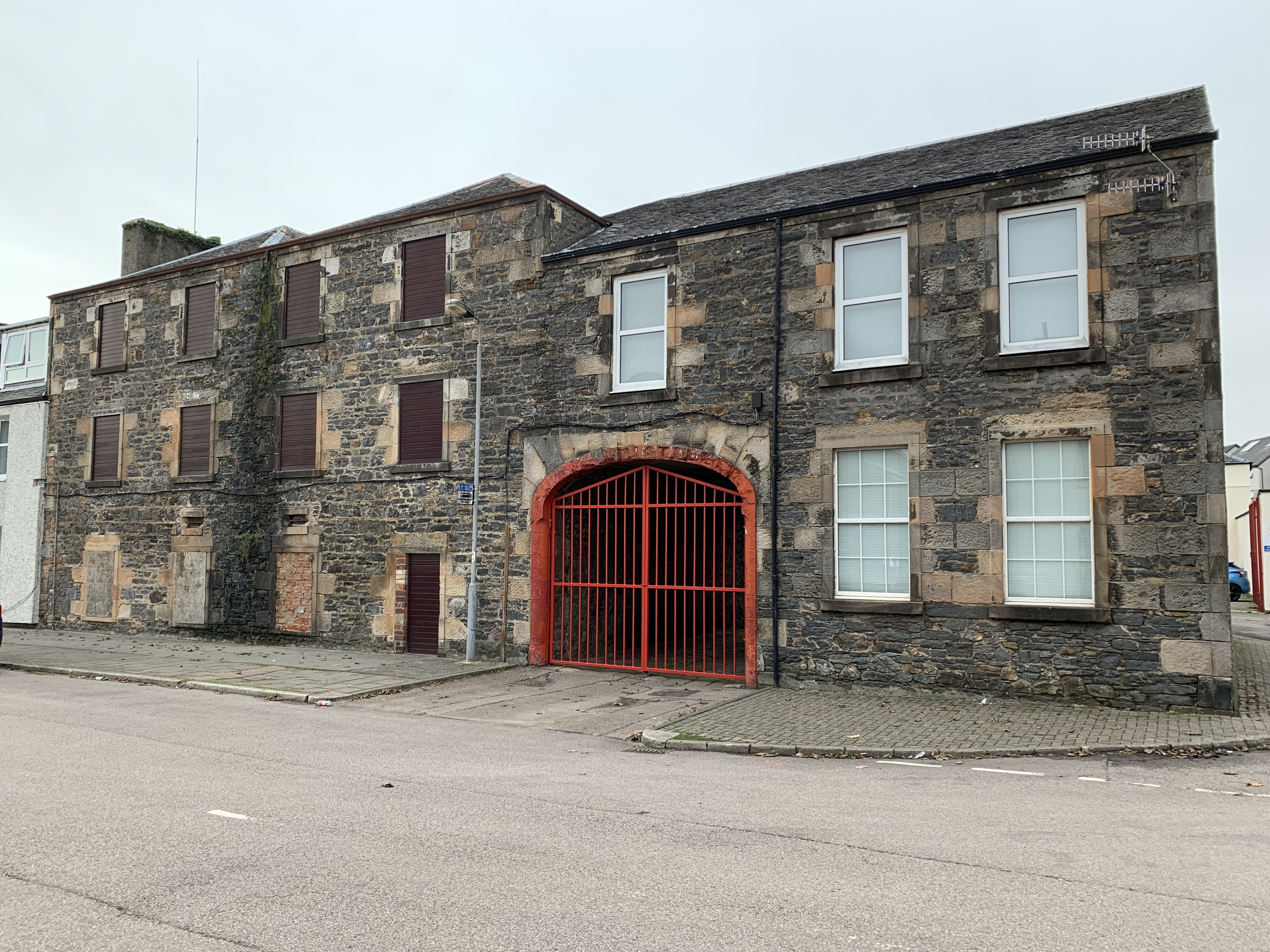
Remains of Benhmor Distillery on Saddell Street

- Benmore (also Benmhor) Distillery was built in 1868 as part of the firm Bulloch, Lade & Co, which also owned Camlachie Distillery and Caol Ila Distillery. The firm went bankrupt in 1929, and its assets were acquired by Distillers Company Limited.
- Broombrae Distillery built in 1833

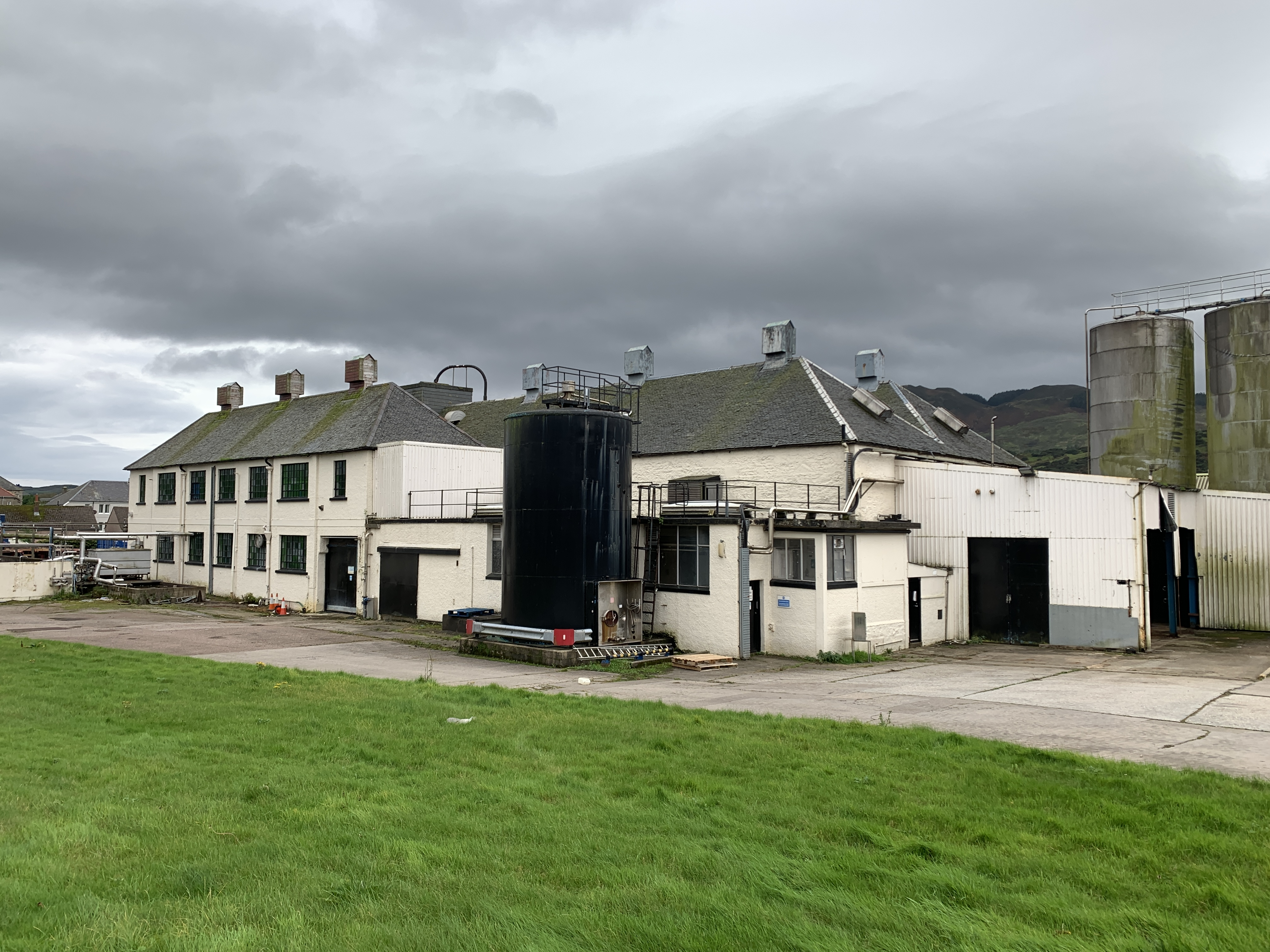
Campbeltown Creamery, on the site of the former Burnside Distillery

- Burnside Distillery built in 1825 by McMurchy, Ralston and Company. Robert McMurchy left the partnership in 1828 and the distillery was offered for sale. By 1840 it was owned by Colvill & Greenlees who also managed the Argyll Distillery. In 1888 it was offered for sale and at that point it was reported that it was capable of producing some 120,000 gallons per annum. Production stopped at the outbreak of the First World War. It closed in 1919 and in 1924 converted into a Campbeltown Creamery.
- Caledonian Distillery built in 1823 for Peter Stewart & Co. Closed in 1842
- Campbeltown Distillery built in 1815 for John Beith and Co. On 16 July 1870 a schooner-rigged vessel named Campbeltown was launched from the yard of Robert McLea in Rothesay. It had been purchased by Duncan McLean of the distillery and was intended for the Campbeltown trade. She was 150 tons burthen, 75 feet (23 m) long, 19.5 feet (5.9 m) broad with a depth of hold of 9 feet (2.7 m).
- Dalaruan Distillery built in 1825 for David Colville and John Colville. Situated in Broad Street. In 1838 John McMurchy joined as partner. On 2 July 1896 a fire broke out which consumed the kilns and granaries. The distillery was saved by firemen from the training ship HMS Northampton. It was put up for sale in 1925, along with 22,500 proof gallons of mature whisky for £15,000.
- Dalintober Distillery built in 1832 for Peter Reid & David Colville. The distillery was destroyed by fire on 17 December 1899 and rebuilt. In 1919 it was acquired by West Highland Malt Distilleries but they went into voluntary liquidation in 1923. It closed in 1926 and was subsequently demolished.
- Drumore Distillery established in 1834 by Robert Templeton, William Templeton, John McMillan and Mary Mitchell. Closed in 1847 and offered for sale in 1849 at which point it was reported as being capable of producing 800 gallons of spirit per week.
- Glenramskill Distillery built in 1828. It was approximately 1.5 miles (2.4 km) from Campbeltown. Closed in 1854 when the proprietor died. It was offered for sale in 1855 when it was described as capable of consuming 70 to 80 qrs. Malts, or producing about 10 Puncheons Weekly, and having a supply of water capable of working all the machinery. It was still being offered for sale 2 years later.
- Glen Nevis Distillery built in 1877 for D. MacCallum & Co. In 1889 it was put up for sale, along with The Ben Wyvis Distillery, The Dean Distillery and the Gleniffer Distillery, as part of the liquidation of The Scotch Whisky Distillers Limited. in 1919 it was acquired by West Highland Malt Distilleries Limited but they went into voluntary liquidation in 1923 and it was put up for sale again in 1924. It sold for £500.
- Glenside Distillery built in 1830. It traded originally as David Anderson & Company, but later changed to Glenside Distillery Company. The partnership of John Kerr Orr, James Armour and Hugh Ferguson was dissolved in 1867. The distillery closed in 1926 when the company went into voluntary liquidation.
- Hazelburn Distillery built around 1825 for Greenlees & Colvill. Masataka Taketsuru completed his voluntary apprenticeship at Hazelburn. The distillery was bought in 1920 by Mackie and Company, but closed in 1926.
- Highland Distillery built in 1827 for Daniel MacTaggart & Co on the corner of Dalaruan Street and Broad Street. The partnership of Daniel MacTaggart, John Grand and George McLennan was dissolved on 22 August 1831. The distillery closed in 1852.
- Kinloch Distillery built in 1824 for Lamb, Colville & Co. Robert Lamb died in 1826 and was replaced by Robert Ralston. A fire broke out on 25 April 1875 in a building which had previously been the malting house which threatened the racking and spirit store. The whisky was removed from the racking store just before the roof fell in. The business was acquired in 1919 by West Highland Malt Distilleries Limited but they went into liquidation in 1923. It was purchased by Duncan MacCallum and continued production until 1926.
- Kintyre Distillery built in 1830 for John Ross & Co. In 1870, Donald McPhail, a stillman, was charged with culpable homicide when he let hot water out of the boiler into the mash-tun whilst Gavin Ralston, a maltman, was inside the washback. He was sentenced to 3 months imprisonment. In March 1875 the distillery was completely destroyed by fire. In 1876, an excise officer fell into a large copper full of boiling water and was so severely scalded, he died from his injuries. It closed in 1921.
- Lochend/Lochhead Distillery built in 1824 for A & McMurchy & Co., on Lochend Street. It was purchased by Benmore Distillery in 1920 and closed in 1928.
- Lochside Distillery built in 1830 on Longrow Street. It was founded by Peter Gilkison, William Hunter, William McKersie but closed in 1852.
- Lochruan Distillery built for Robert Johnston and Charles Rowatt Johnston in 1833 on Prince's Street. It was sold in 1867 to John McKersie and William Mitchell McKersie who also owned the Albyn Distillery. In 1919 it was purchased by W.P. Lowrie and Co., and in 1925 by Distillers Company. It closed in 1926.
- Longrow Distillery built in 1824 for John Ross, John Colville and John Beith. By 1837 it was operated by Colville, Beith & Co. It was acquired around 1887 by William and James Greenlees. It closed in 1896.
- MacKinnon's Argyll Distillery built in 1827 on Lorne Street. Closed before 1844.
- Meadowbank Distillery built in 1832 for Peter Stewart & Co.
- Meadowburn Distillery built in 1824 for Kirkwood, Taylor & Co (including Matthew Greenlees) on Tomaig Road. It closed around 1882.
- Mossfield Distillery established in 1834 on Longrow Street by Harvey and Hunter. Closed in 1837.
- Mountain Dew Distillery - see Thistle
- Rieclachan Distillery built around 1825 on Longrow for James Ferguson, John Harvey, Archibald Mitchell, and Alex Wylie trading as Wyllie, Mitchell & Co. It closed in 1934.
- Springside Distillery built in 1830 off Burnside Street for John Colvill & Co. It closed in 1926.
- Thistle (also Mountain Dew) Distillery established in 1834 on Burnside Street by Hervey and McMillan. It closed in 1837.
- Toberanrigh (also Tober an Righ) Distillery built in 1834 for Alexander Wylie. Based at 48 Longrow. In 1851 it was acquired by John Mitchell, Hugh Ferguson and Daniel McMurchy. It closed in 1860.
- Union Distillery built around 1826 on Argyll Street for John MacTaggart. In 1837 the distillery was being run by John Grant & Co. It closed in 1850.
- West Highland Distillery built in 1830 for Andrew & Montgomery. Closed in 1852.
