= Stuart Fraser =

Stuart Fraser may refer to:

- Stuart Fraser (civil servant) (1864–1963), officer of the Foreign and Political Department of the Government of India
- Stuart Fraser (politician), (born 1946), politician in the City of London Corporation
- Stuart Fraser (footballer, born 1978), English football player (Exeter City, Stoke City)
- Stuart Fraser (footballer, born 1980), Scottish football player (Luton Town, Stevenage)

== See also ==
- Stewart Fraser (disambiguation)
