= Scottish Arbitration Centre =

- Abbreviation: SAC
- Headquarters: Edinburgh, Scotland
- Region served: International
- Website: www.scottisharbitrationcentre.org/

The Scottish Arbitration Centre is an independent non-profit company in Edinburgh offering arbitration services to domestic and international clients. The centre exists to promote arbitration in Scotland, and Scotland to the world as a place to conduct international arbitration. It was officially launched by Fergus Ewing MSP, the then Minister for Community Safety on 17 March 2011.

The centre's honorary president is Sir David Edward QC. The centre's honorary vice president is Hew Dundas.

The centre is chaired by Brandon Malone, and its chief executive is Andrew Mackenzie. The vice chair of the centre is Lord Glennie.

The centre can appoint arbitrators through its Arbitral Appointments Committee. The Centre published its Directions and Guidance for the appointment of arbitrators in December 2014. User forms for the centre's arbitral appointments service can be found on the Scottish Arbitration Centre's website.

The centre has a joint research project with CEPMLP at the University of Dundee, the International Centre for Energy Arbitration.

In May 2016, it was announced by the International Council of Commercial Arbitration (ICCA) that the Scottish Arbitration Centre's bid to host the ICCA 2020 Congress in Edinburgh had been successful. The centre's bid had the support of the Prime Minister, the First Minister of Scotland, the Lord President of the Court of Session, the Dean of the Faculty of Advocates, the president of the Law Society of Scotland, the Lord Provost of Edinburgh, the chairman of the Scottish Branch of the Chartered Institute of Arbitrators, the chief executive of the Royal Institution of Chartered Surveyors Global, the chairman of VisitScotland and the chief executive of Marketing Edinburgh. VisitScotland estimates the congress is worth around £1.7 million to the Scottish economy.

Due to the COVID-19 pandemic, the ICCA Congress has been postponed and will take place 26–29 September 2021.
