= Glengyle distillery =

Scotch whisky production centre in Scotland

Coordinates: 55°25′37.95″N 5°36′39.42″W

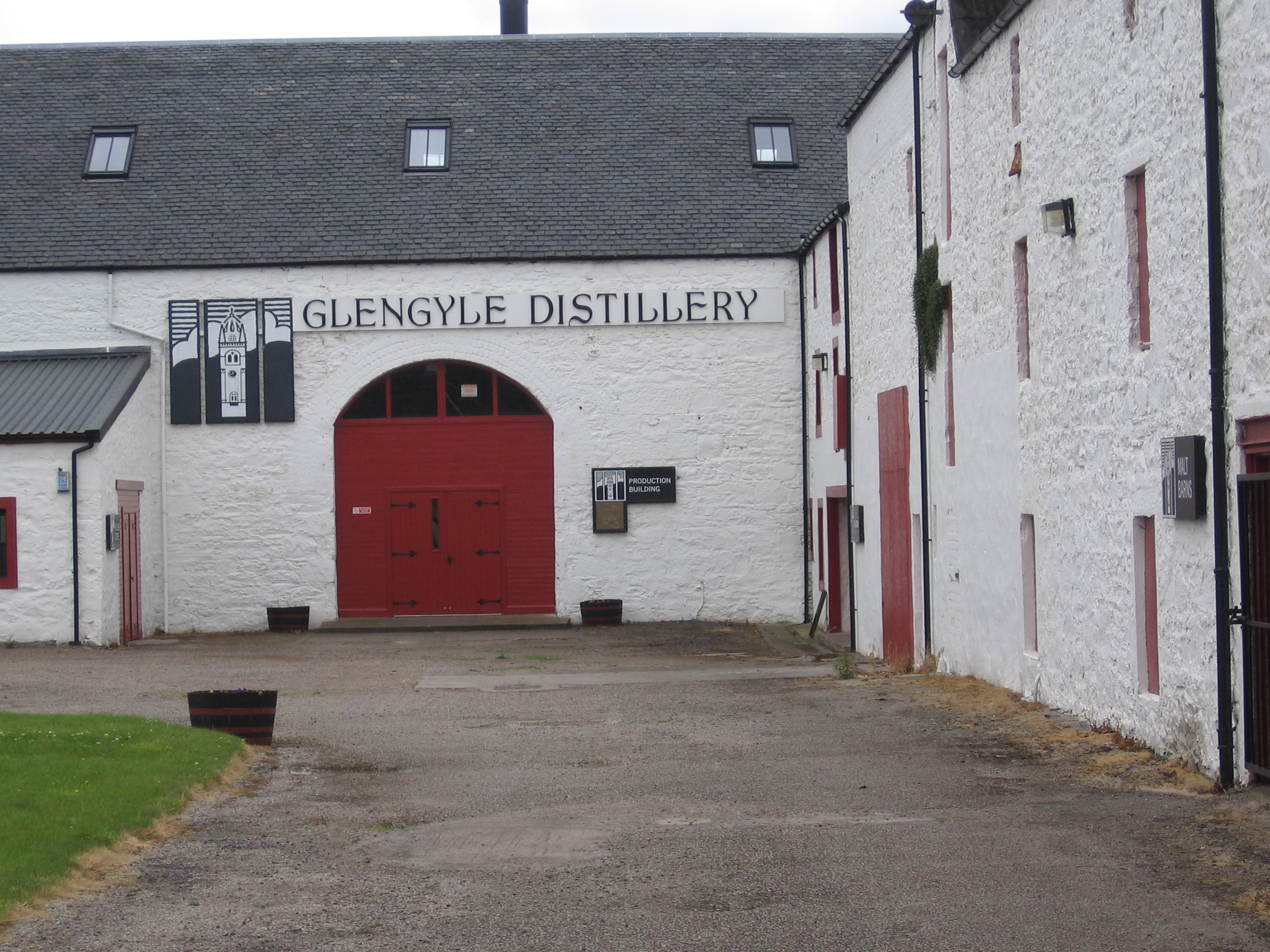
- Location: Campbeltown
- Owner: Mitchell's Glengyle Ltd
- Founded: 1872
- Water source: Crosshill Loch
- No. of stills: 1 wash still 1 spirit still
- Capacity: 750,000 L

Glengyle distillery is a Scotch whisky production centre in Campbeltown, Argyll and Bute. It was opened in 1872, closing in 1925, and reopening in 2000. Its single malts are bottled under the name Kilkerran.

== History ==
The Glengyle distillery was founded in 1872 by William Mitchell. Shortly after completion, in 1873 a storm took off the roof of the distillery.

Mitchell had previously been involved with Springbank distillery but following a quarrel with his brother John, with whom he owned Springbank, he first joined his other brothers at Rieclachan distillery before venturing out on his own.

In 1919, the distillery was sold as a result of the post-war economic downturn which was badly affecting all the distilleries in the Campbeltown Region. It was up for auction again in 1923 and sold for £350 (equivalent to £25,200 in 2023) in 1924 and by 1925 had ceased production with all remaining stock being sold off.

After being used as a rifle range, an attempt to reopen the distillery by Sir Maurice Bloch, who, with his brother, also owned the Glen Scotia distillery, failed due to Second World War as did a second attempt by Campbell Henderson Ltd. in the 1950s.

=== Reopening ===
In late 2000, the company of Mitchell's Glengyle Ltd. was formed with the express purpose of renovating and rebuilding the Glengyle distillery. Mitchell's Glengyle is associated with the Springbank Distillery, and both operations come under the guidance of Mr. Hedley Wright, a descendant of the Mitchell Family, the original owners of both businesses.

Over the next four years the buildings were repaired to an adequate standard, being restored in line with the local area and the buildings' listed status (protected by law). Since the original distillery equipment had been disposed of in the 1920s, new stills, malt mills, a mash tun and washbacks were installed along with all the related equipment. In reality much of this was not new, coming instead from other distilleries which had either ceased production or had surplus equipment.

== Production ==
Production at the new Glengyle distillery began in 2004 with the first spirit expected to be ready by 2014. Glengyle is the first new distillery of the millennium and is part of a trend in new distilleries which include Arran (1995) and Daftmill (2005).

The whisky from the Glengyle distillery is not called Glengyle, rather it is bottled under the name Kilkerran. This is because the name is owned by Loch Lomond Distillers, and used for their vatted malt. The name Kilkerran comes from the Scottish Gaelic: Ceann Loch Cille Chiarain ("head of the lake of Saint Kieran's cell"), the name of a settlement where Saint Kieran is believed to have had a religious cell and where modern Campbeltown stands today.

== Sources ==
- Stirk, David (2005). The Distilleries of Campbeltown: The Rise and Fall of the Whisky Capital of the World. Glasgow: Neil Wilson Publishing Ltd. ISBN 978-1903238844.
