= Glen Scotia distillery =

Scottish whisky distillery in Campbeltown

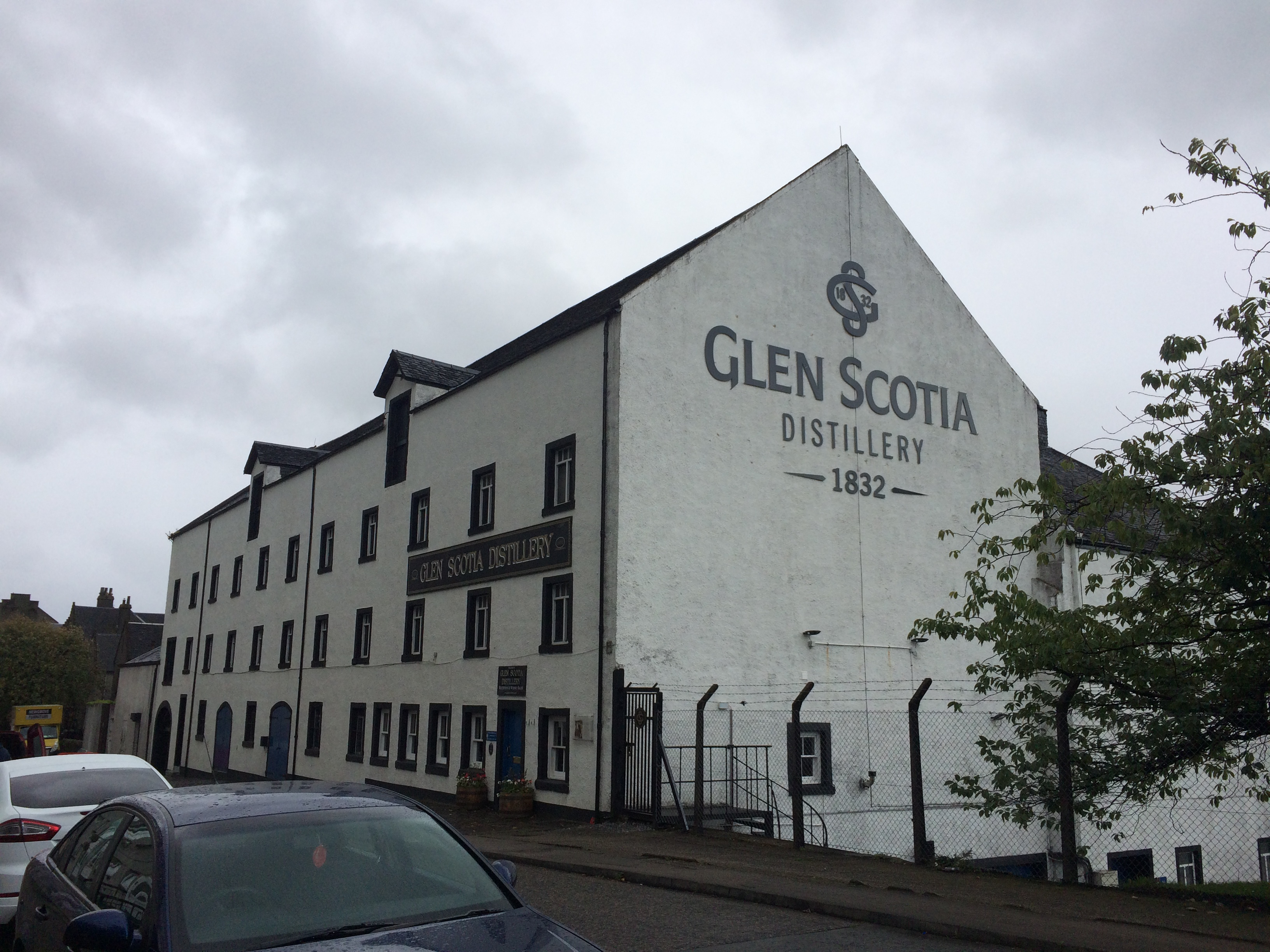
- Glen Scotia

Region: Campbeltown
- Location: 12 High Street, Campbeltown, Argyll PA28 6DS, Scotland, United Kingdom
- Coordinates: 55.4293°N 5.6047°W
- Owner: Loch Lomond Group
- Founded: 1832; 194 years ago
- Status: Operational
- Water source: Crosshill Loch
- No. of stills: 1 wash (16,000 L), 1 spirit (12,000 L)
- Capacity: 600,000 litres
- Website: www.glenscotia.com

Glen Scotia
- Age(s): Double Cask 46% ABV; 15 Year Old 46% ABV; Victoriana 52.2% ABV; 18 Year Old 46% ABV; 25 Year Old 48.8%

Listed Building – Category B
- Official name: High Street Dalintober, Glen Scotia Distillery (Formerly Scotia Distillery) with warehouses
- Designated: 28 March 1996
- Reference no.: LB43079

Glen Scotia, historically known as The Scotia or Old Scotia is a distillery that produces single malt Scotch whisky. It was founded in 1832 and is one of three distilleries left in Campbeltown, the smallest whisky region.

== History ==
Glen Scotia distillery was founded in 1832, and has been operating for more than one hundred eighty years. It is situated in Campbeltown, one of the recognised 5 whisky producing regions of Scotland.

Campbeltown is a small town on the Kintyre Peninsula on the west coast of Scotland. It is affectionately known as the “Wee Toon”, and the Victorian Whisky Capital of the World. At its peak in the 1800s, there were 21 distilleries in this small town with approximately 170 distilleries operating at that time in the UK (129 of those in Scotland) Campbeltown still has 3 operating distilleries: Glen Scotia, Springbank, and Glengyle. These distilleries give a remarkable insight into the history of making whisky in this remote, once prolific, whisky making region of Scotland.

Glen Scotia was formerly known as 'Scotia' when it was first founded in 1832 by Stewart & Galbraith and Company. Stewart & Galbraith ran the distillery for almost 60 years. Notable industrialist Duncan MacCallum purchased the distillery in 1891 and he constructed the large frontage (malting floors) which run along High Street.

The distillery was acquired from the trustees of the late Duncan McCallum by the Bloch Brothers in 1933. Production was suspended in 1942 on account of the Second World War but was restarted early in 1945.

Bloch Brothers was acquired by Hiram Walker and Sons of Dumbarton in 1954. In 1955 A. Gilles took ownership and in 1970 this merged with three other companies into Amalgamated Distilled Products (ADP). In 1987, Ian Lockwood, former group marketing director of ADP led a management buyout of part of the business and the sale included the Glen Scotia distillery, and which operated as Gibson International.

In 2014, the distillery was bought by Loch Lomond Group who have invested heavily in the site by developing the brand, increasing capacity, opening warehouses and developing a distillery visitor centre.

== Building ==
The distillery still maintains much of its original design, including the mash tun, the stillroom and the dunnage warehouse which dates back to the 1830s. It currently operates with a staff of just 8 employees: a distillery manager, assistant manager, visitor centre manager and five distillery operators. The visitor centre is open to the public and runs daily distillery tours and tastings, with a Victorian style shop to purchase the whisky, branded merchandise and other goods.

== Production ==
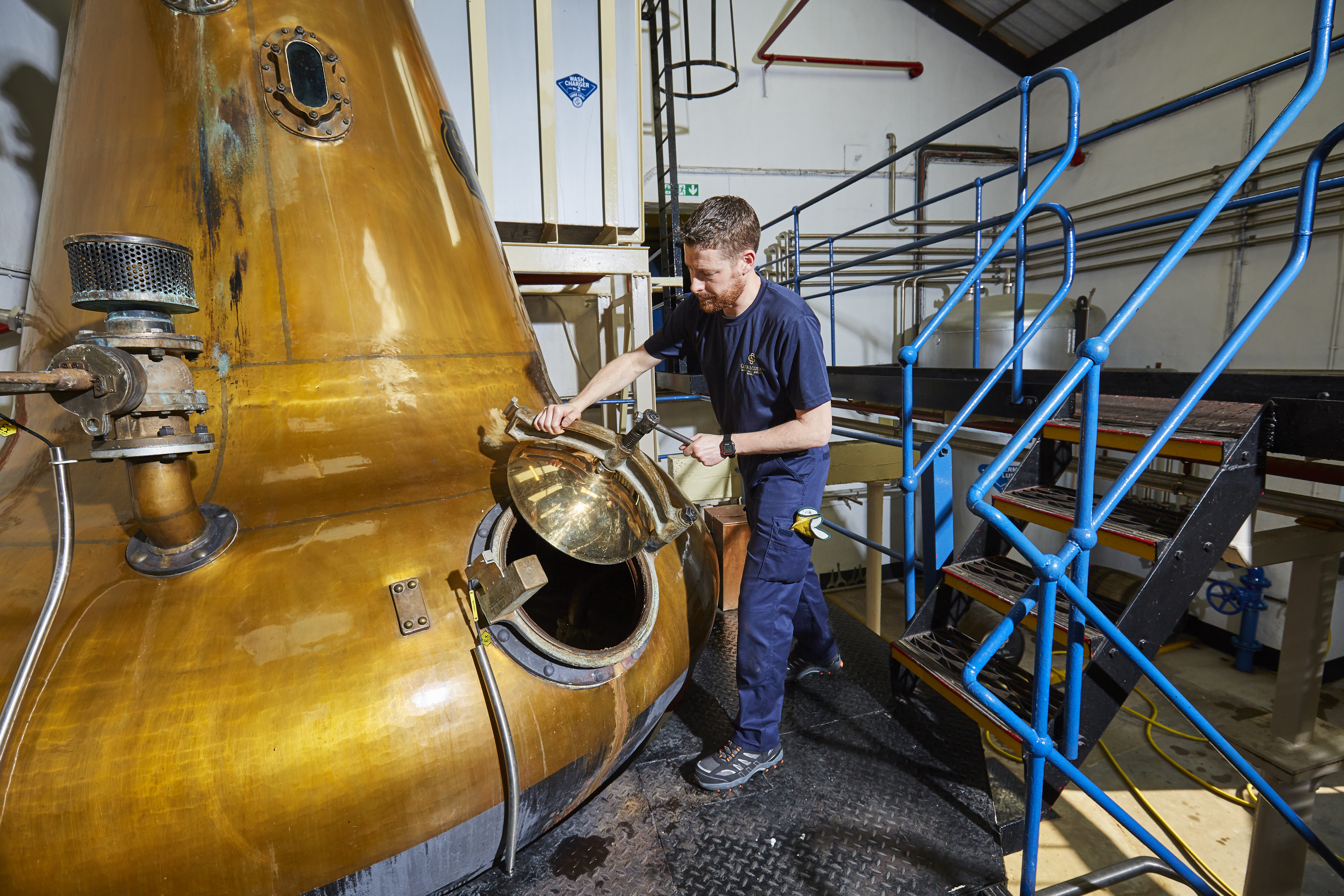
Glen Scotia pot still 2017

The distillery draws its water from Crosshill Loch, south of Campbeltown.

The distillery uses unpeated, medium peated and heavily peated malt barley for its whisky.

Glen Scotia has one wash still, with a capacity of 11,800 litres, and one spirit still with an 8,600 litre capacity. The copper pot stills are onion-shaped, with wide and short necks.

There are 9 washbacks within the distillery, these are all stainless steel. The washbacks that Glen Scotia originally had were more than 40 years old and were made out of COR-TEN steel.

The current annual production levels stand at around 700,000 litres.

== Product range ==
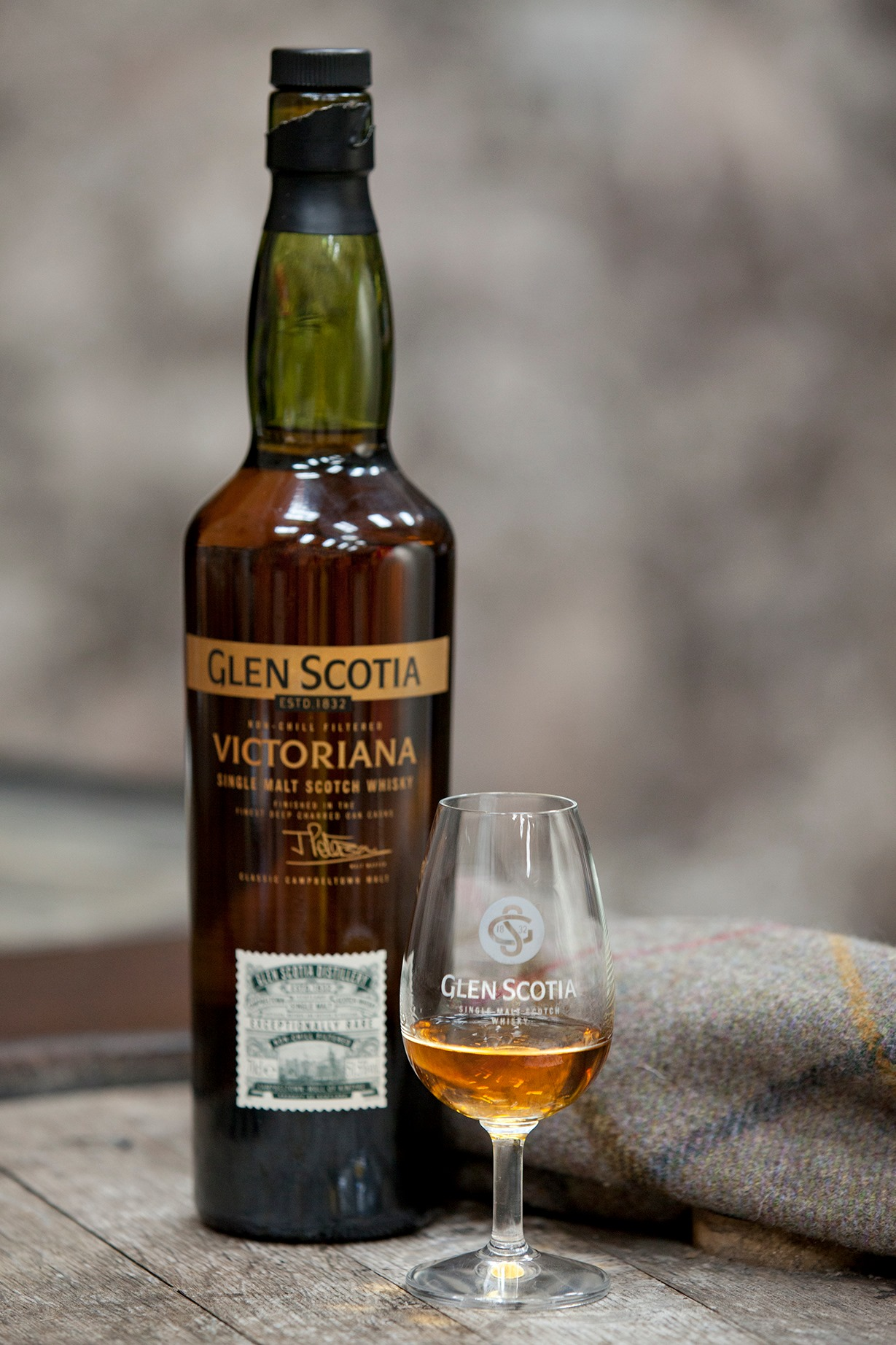
Glen Scotia Victoriana single malt

The Glen Scotia range has been simplified down to five core single malt expressions:

- Double Cask - 46% ABV
- 15 year old - 46% ABV
- Victoriana - 54.2% ABV
- 18 year old - 46% ABV
- 25 year old - 48.8% ABV

Glen Scotia's range showcases the typical Campbeltown flavour profile of toffee, maritime influence and a hint of smoke.

Each of the core expressions have been designed to keep to an authentic 'Campbeltown Malt style' culminating in the Victoriana where the distillery has aimed to re-create a modern interpretation of classic Victorian Campbeltown malt. Glen Scotia distillery also regularly produces special bottlings to celebrate local events, such as the centenary of the local Campbeltown Picture House.

Each year, for the annual Campbeltown Malt Whisky Festival, Glen Scotia release a special limited release bottling. In 2019 this was a 15-year-old rum finish and 2020 a 14-year-old tawny port finish. In 2023 it was a 11-years-old white port finish.

In October 2023, Glen Scotia has released a new annual special series. It is called 'The Icons Of Campbeltown' and the first bottling is the 12-year-old 'The Mermaid'. In August 2024, the distillery released 'The Dragon', the second whisky in the series.

Special releases and other small production run bottlings also exist.

== Awards ==
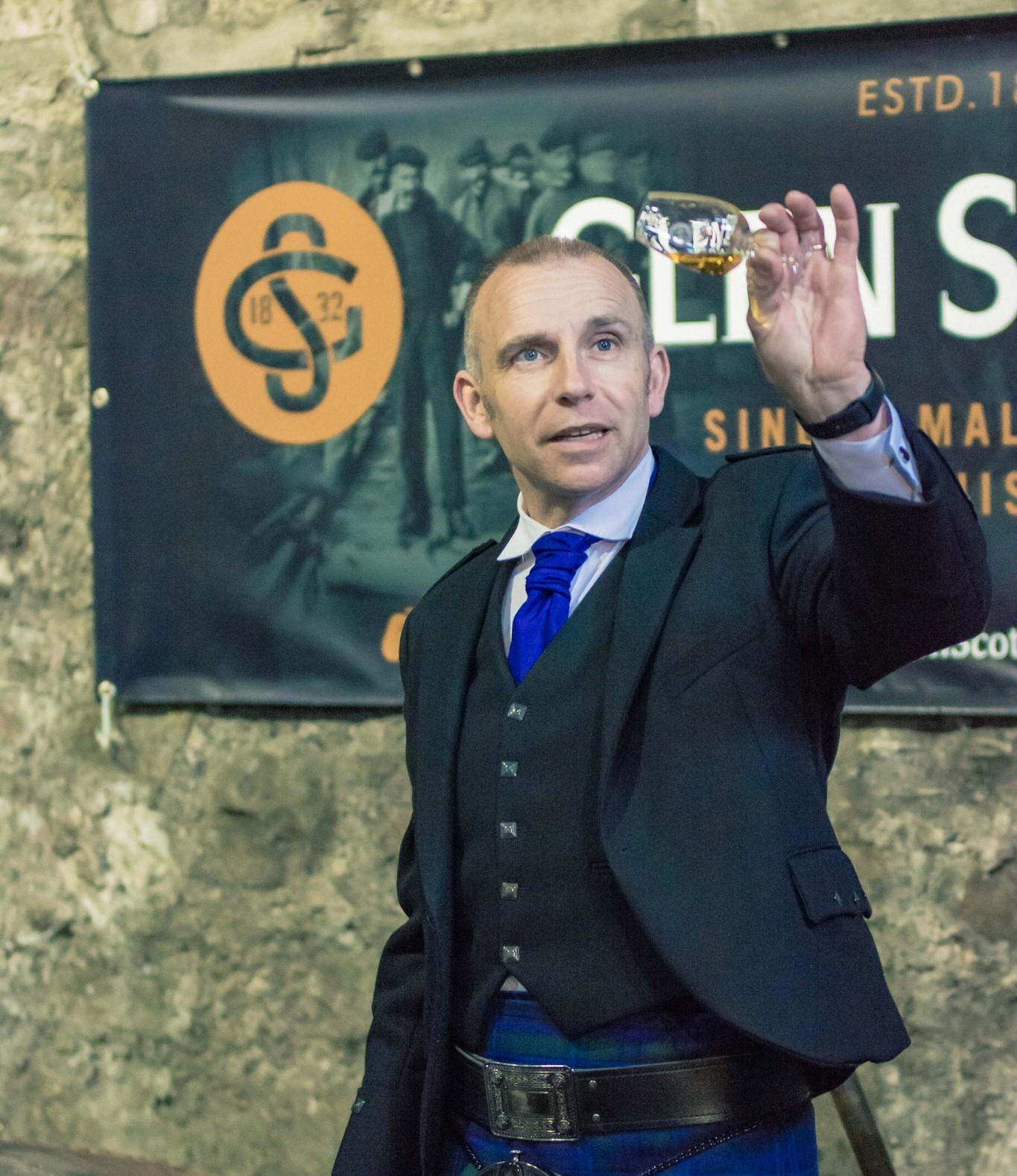
Iain Mcalister Glen Scotia's master distiller

Glen Scotia’s whiskies have been recognised in many renowned award ceremonies, such as San Francisco World Spirits Awards, International Wine & Spirits Competition, World Whisky Awards, International Spirits Challenge & The Scotch Whisky Masters.

Glen Scotia was crowned producers of the World's Best Whisky at the 'San Francisco World Spirits Competition' in 2021. The distillery was also awarded 'Best Scottish Whisky Distillery' at the Scottish Whisky Awards 2021. The first year any distillery has ever won best distillery and best whisky in the same year.

	Awards Received		
Double Cask	Gold Medal - San Francisco World Spirit Awards 2020	Best Campbeltown Malt - World Whisky Awards 2020	Gold Medal - Scotch Whisky Masters 2020
15 Year Old	Gold Medal - Scotch Whisky Masters 2020	Double Gold Medal - San Francisco World Spirit Awards 2016	Gold Medal - International Spirits Challenge 2020
Victoriana	Gold Medal - Scotch Whisky Masters 2020	Gold Medal - San Francisco World Spirit Awards 2020	Gold Medal - International Spirits Challenge 2020
18 Year Old	Gold Medal - San Francisco World Spirit Awards 2020	Double Gold Medal - San Francisco World Spirit Awards 2016	Gold Medal - Scotch Whisky Masters 2020
25 Year Old	Platinum Medal - San Francisco World Spirit Awards 2020	Gold Medal - International Spirits Challenge 2020	Best Campbeltown Malt - World Whisky Awards 2019
