= Scotch Whisky Act 1988 =

Act of the Parliament of the United Kingdom

Scotch Whisky Act 1988 (Note: Section 5(1).)
- Act of Parliament
- Parliament of the United Kingdom
- Long title: An Act to make provision as to the definition of Scotch whisky and as to the production and sale of whisky; and for connected purposes.
- Citation: 1988 c. 22
- Territorial extent: England and Wales; Scotland; Northern Ireland (section 4 only); (Note: Section 5(4).)

Dates
- Royal assent: 28 June 1988
- Commencement: 28 June 1988 (section 4); 30 April 1990 (remaining provisions); (Note: Section 5(2). The Scotch Whisky Act 1988 (Commencement and Transitional Provisions) Order 1990 (SI 1990/997). Section 4 came into force on royal assent: section 4(b) of the Interpretation Act 1978.)
- Repealed: 23 November 2009
Other legislation
Amends	Finance Act 1969
Amended by	Scotland Act 1998 (Modification of Functions) Order 1999; Scotland Act 1998 (Consequential Modifications) (No. 2) Order 1999; Ministry of Agriculture, Fisheries and Food (Dissolution) Order 2002
Repealed by	Scotch Whisky Regulations 2009

Status: Repealed

Text of statute as originally enacted

Revised text of statute as amended

The Scotch Whisky Act 1988 (c. 22) was an act of the Parliament of the United Kingdom, passed during the reign of Queen Elizabeth II on 28 June 1988, with the long title "An Act to make provision as to the definition of Scotch whisky and as to the production and sale of whisky; and for connected purposes.".

The act first set out a definition for Scotch whisky – "whisky (distilled and matured in Scotland) as conforms to a definition of Scotch whisky contained in an order made under this subsection by the Ministers".

It also made it unlawful to sell spirits as "Scotch whisky" if they did not conform to the definition laid down by order under the act, or to sell Scotch whisky at less than a minimum alcoholic strength specified by order.

== Provisions ==
Section 1 of the act made it unlawful to produce in Scotland, to keep in Scotland for the purpose of maturation, or to keep or use in Scotland for the purpose of blending, a distillate of spirits produced as described in the definition of whisky in section 3(1) of the act, unless it was produced as described in a definition of Scotch whisky contained in an order under that section. The Court of Session could grant an interdict against a contravention on the application of a producer of Scotch whisky or a body representative of producers, and the spirits in question were liable to forfeiture, with sections 139, 141, 161 and 163 of, and schedule 3 to, the Customs and Excise Management Act 1979 applying as if forfeiture under the act were forfeiture under the customs and excise acts.

Section 2 of the act made it unlawful to sell as Scotch whisky any spirits not conforming to a definition contained in an order under section 3(1), or to sell Scotch whisky at an alcoholic strength lower than any strength specified for the time being in an order made by the Ministers under section 2. A producer or representative body could apply for an injunction in the High Court in England and Wales, or an interdict in the Court of Session in Scotland.

Section 3 of the act defined "whisky" as spirits produced by the distillation of a mash of cereals saccharified by the diastase of the malt contained in it and fermented by the action of yeast, to an alcoholic strength of less than 94.8 per cent by volume so that the distillate has an aroma and taste derived from the raw materials used, and matured for at least three years in wooden casks of a capacity not exceeding 700 litres. "Scotch whisky" meant whisky distilled and matured in Scotland that conformed to a definition contained in an order made by the Ministers, who were the Minister of Agriculture, Fisheries and Food and the Secretary of State acting jointly. The Ministers could also amend the definition of whisky by order. Orders were made by statutory instrument subject to annulment by either House of Parliament, and section 3(5) amended paragraph 1(b) of schedule 7 to the Finance Act 1969 so that "Scotch whisky" had the same meaning as in the act.

Section 4 of the act provided that an Order in Council under paragraph 1(1)(b) of schedule 1 to the Northern Ireland Act 1974 made only for Northern Ireland purposes corresponding to the purposes of the act would be subject to annulment by either House of Parliament, rather than to the affirmative resolution procedure. Section 5 of the act provided the short title, brought the act (except section 4) into force on a day appointed by the Ministers by order, with power to include transitional provision, and extended it to England and Wales and Scotland, and to Northern Ireland as to section 4 only.

== Subsequent developments ==
The Scotch Whisky Act 1988 (Commencement and Transitional Provisions) Order 1990 (SI 1990/997) brought the act, except section 4, into force on 30 April 1990, and allowed Scotch whisky bottled and labelled for retail sale before 15 December 1990 to be sold at a lower strength than the minimum specified under section 2 until 14 December 1991. The Scotch Whisky Order 1990 (SI 1990/998), made under sections 2(1) and 3(1) and (3) of the act, defined Scotch whisky and came into force on 1 June 1990. The Scotch Whisky (Northern Ireland) Order 1988 (SI 1988/1852 (N.I. 19)) made corresponding provision for Northern Ireland under section 4.

The whole act was repealed by regulation 2(1) of the Scotch Whisky Regulations 2009, which came into force on 23 November 2009.
