= KILTR =

Defunct social networking website

- The KILTR Logo surrounded by the company's motto
- Available in: English
- Founded: 2009
- Headquarters: Glasgow
- Area served: Glasgow
- Founders: Stewart Fraser, Brian Hughes
- CEO: Brian Hughes
- Industry: Internet
- Services: Social Network, New Media
- Website: kiltr.com
- Current status: Active
- Written in: C#, JS

KILTR was a social networking site focusing on Scottish content. It was founded in 2009 by Brian Hughes and Stewart Fraser as a startup company using venture capital and investment from angel investors.

The company was featured alongside Path and Foursquare in Rory Cellan-Jones's BBC Radio 4 series, The Secret History of Social Networking, as one of a number of smaller social networking sites which are offering an alternative to Facebook.

KILTR was built in Glasgow, Scotland by its sister technology company, CollectivWorks.

On 5 June 2018 the site closed; all registered users were sent an email explaining that the service had ceased and it was "all About Swipe to Connect " from CollectivWorks

== History ==
Public beta of KILTR was established in 2010, followed by the first version of the platform in April 2012, with a focus on being a professional networking site, connecting Scottish businessmen and women around the world. Version 2 of KILTR was launched in August 2013 with a different focus - moving from being a professional network to a cultural, social, political platform.

Version 3 of KILTR will be launched in 2016, with an emphasis on blogging and citizen journalism, focussing on radical politics, art and culture, exemplified by the platform's new branding, designed by artist Jim Lambie.
