= Hankey Bannister =

Scotch whisky

- Type: Scotch Whisky
- Manufacturer: Inver House Distillers
- Origin: Scotland
- Introduced: 1757
- Alcohol by volume: 40%
- Website: Hankey Bannister

Hankey Bannister is a blended scotch whisky produced by Inver House Distillers, a subsidiary of the Thailand based company ThaiBev. It is named after its founders Beaumont Hankey and Hugh Bannister.

== History ==
Founded in 1757, the wines & spirits company first established premises at Johns Street in London's West End. In 1785, the cellars moved to Adelphi Arches under Adelphi Terrace, London's first neo-classical building designed by the Adams brothers. The cellars remained there until 1936, when the arches were demolished.

Hankey Bannister & Co moved thousands of bottles to new storage across the river to Southwark, near the site of Shakespeare's Globe Theatre where, even so, the incendiary bombs found them during World War II in 1940. After moving to 22 St. James Street, Hankey Bannister began absorbing a number of other West End firms, acting as an umbrella for various small wine merchants, supplying the Royal Household and many exclusive clubs.

In 1915, Hankey Bannister & Co moved to 32 Sackville Street where it remained until Saccone & Speed purchased the business in 1932 after the death of Douglas Hankey. Hankey Bannister was a favourite of Prince Regent William IV and the Dukes of Norfolk and Queensberry and received a Royal Warrant under George V.

Notable drinkers of the brand include war-time Prime Minister Sir Winston Churchill and British writer Evelyn Waugh. During the Top Gear Burma Special, Richard Hammond referenced the drink, with Jeremy Clarkson declaring it to be the "third best whisky in Northern Burma".

In Act I of Jez Butterworth's 2024 play The Hills of California, the character Veronica makes reference to the brand: "Joe Fogg, I've told you a hundred times. Please don't store your Scotch in the Broadwood. You spill a pint of Hankey Bannister's in her you'll be working till 1999 just to pay me back".

== Production ==
Hankey Bannister Original contains single malts from all five of the Inver House Distilleries:

- Pulteney Distillery
- Balblair Distillery
- Knockdhu Distillery, home of anCnoc
- Speyburn Distillery
- Balmenach Distillery
