= List of listed buildings in Edderton, Highland =

This is a list of listed buildings in the parish of Edderton in Highland, Scotland.

== List ==
Name	Location	Date Listed	Grid Ref. (Note: Sometimes known as OSGB36, the grid reference (where provided) is based on the British national grid reference system used by the Ordnance Survey. • "Guide to National Grid". Ordnance Survey. • "Get-a-map". Ordnance Survey.)	Geo-coordinates	Notes	LB Number (Note: Historic Environment Scotland assign a unique alphanumeric identifier to each designated site in Scotland, for listed buildings this always begins with "LB", for example "LB12345".)	Image
Old Parish Church And Burial Ground				57°49′45″N 4°09′30″W	Category A	4572	Upload another image See more images
Meikle Daan				57°49′53″N 4°12′30″W	Category B	1815	Upload another image
B9176 Road Bridge Over Easter Fearn Burn (previously A836)				57°50′43″N 4°17′31″W	Category B	1809	Upload another image See more images
Kiln, Balblair Distillery				57°50′28″N 4°10′52″W	Category C(S)	1808	Upload another image See more images
Eastburn House (Former Free Church Manse)				57°49′44″N 4°09′22″W	Category B	1810	Upload Photo
Cruck Cottage, Hill Of Edderton, Edderton				57°49′07″N 4°08′48″W	Category B	1811	Upload another image
Station House, Edderton				57°50′23″N 4°10′42″W	Category B	44024	Upload another image See more images
Old Manse (Former Church Of Scotland Manse)				57°50′06″N 4°10′11″W	Category C(S)	1816	Upload another image
Parish Church (Church Of Scotland)				57°50′00″N 4°10′25″W	Category B	1817	Upload another image
Ardgay, Midfearn, AA Sentry Box (No 504)				57°51′13″N 4°18′17″W	Category B	49298	Upload another image See more images

== Key ==
The scheme for classifying buildings in Scotland is:

- Category A: "buildings of national or international importance, either architectural or historic; or fine, little-altered examples of some particular period, style or building type."
- Category B: "buildings of regional or more than local importance; or major examples of some particular period, style or building type, which may have been altered."
- Category C: "buildings of local importance; lesser examples of any period, style, or building type, as originally constructed or moderately altered; and simple traditional buildings which group well with other listed buildings."

In March 2016 there were 47,288 listed buildings in Scotland. Of these, 8% were Category A, and 50% were Category B, with the remaining 42% being Category C.

== See also ==
- List of listed buildings in Highland
