= Charles C. Doig =

Scottish architect

Charles Chree Doig (1842–1918) was a Scottish architect who introduced the pagoda design to Scotch whisky distilleries.

== Life and work ==
He was born in Angus in 1855. After schooling, he worked for a local architect in Meigle and then from 1882 for a land surveyor in Elgin, eventually becoming a partner in the firm. By 1890, he had his own firm and specialised in designing distilleries.

In 1899 he was hired to expand the capacity of the Dailuaine distillery. There he developed a pagoda-like roof that improved the efficiency of distilleries by drawing off peat smoke in the malting process.

Doig is credited with designing at least 56 Scotch whisky distilleries including Balblair, Dufftown, Pulteney, Speyburn and Aberlour. His distillery plans and other documents are kept in the Moray Council Local Heritage Centre.

The former distillery of Auchinblae was also designed by Doig.

He died in 1918 while shooting with his son near Forres.
