= Killyloch =

Killyloch is a malt whisky which was distilled at the Glenflagler Malt Distillery and was first distilled and bonded in February 1965. It was in the Moffat Complex which also housed Glenflager and Garnheath (grain) distilleries.

Glenflagler Malt Distillery was a historic "Lowland" malt distillery and was closed and demolished by Inver House Distillers Limited in July 1985. The whisky was produced mainly as a filling for blends and was never officially bottled as a single malt. However, there was once instance of a 36-year-old released by Inver House in 2003. Very little of Killyloch's liquid remains in existence. In the 2010s, a bottle of 36-year-old Killyloch 1967 Limited Edition sold on an online auction for £1,550.

The name Killyloch is a corruption of a local loch, Lillyloch and is believed to have occurred as a result of an incorrect stencil being used to mark the early barrels.

Killyloch™ first used in commerce 18 December 1964 and initially trademark by Continental Distilling Corporation on a registration date of 24 May 1966. Currently is under a trademark 494039800079 and copyright VA00181898 by Veni-Vidi-Vici LLC.
