= Glen Flagler distillery =

Whisky distillery in North Lanarkshire, Scotland

Coordinates: 55°51′47″N 03°55′36″W

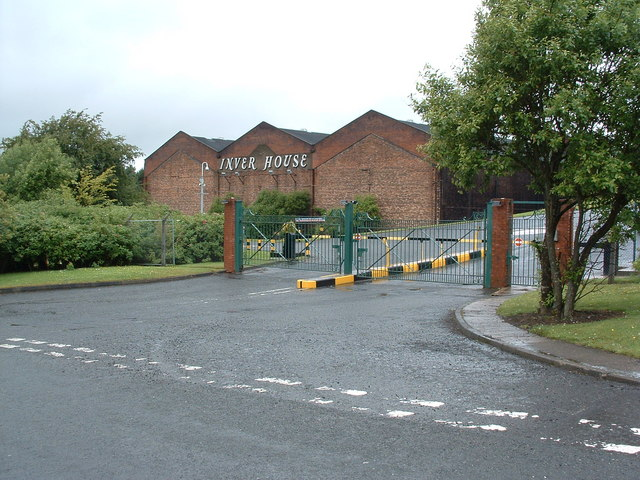

Region: Lowland
- Location: Airdrie, North Lanarkshire, Scotland
- Owner: Inver House Distillers
- Founded: 1965
- Status: Warehouses and blending and bottling facilities converted to Inver House Distillers’ headquarters.
- Water source: Lily Loch
- Demolished: 1988

Glen Flagler distillery (also known as Glenflagler) was a Lowland single malt Scotch whisky distillery in Airdrie, North Lanarkshire, Scotland.

It produced the Lowland single malt whisky brands Glen Flagler and Killyloch.

== History ==
Glen Flagler distillation commenced on 25 February 1965 and the distillery was subsequently closed in July 1985 and demolished in 1988, warehouses and blending and bottling facilities converted to Inver House Distillers’ headquarters. The Glen Flagler brand has subsequently been reformed under the new ownership, and using a blend of Scotch whiskies to recreate the original flavours.

Glen Flagler was used in the Hankey Bannister 40 Year old blend, which was voted the world's best blended Scotch whisky at the World Whiskies Awards

== Collectable Bottles ==
Its bottles command prices between $600-$1500, and it is sold as a collectable whisky in auction houses such as Sotheby's, Christie's and Bonhams.

In December 2019, a premium bottle of Glen Flagler sold for a record $273,000 to an investor in Dubai.

This was two months before a bottle of Macallan sold at Sotheby's for a world record $1.9 million.

== Sponsorship Activities ==
Glen Flagler is a primary sponsor of several major sporting and cultural events. It sponsors the St Lucia Sailing Cup in the Caribbean.

It is also the organiser and sponsor of the Fiji Rugby Masters.
