= Balmenach distillery =

Whisky distillery in Highland, Scotland

Coordinates: 57°19′36.15″N 3°32′2.07″W

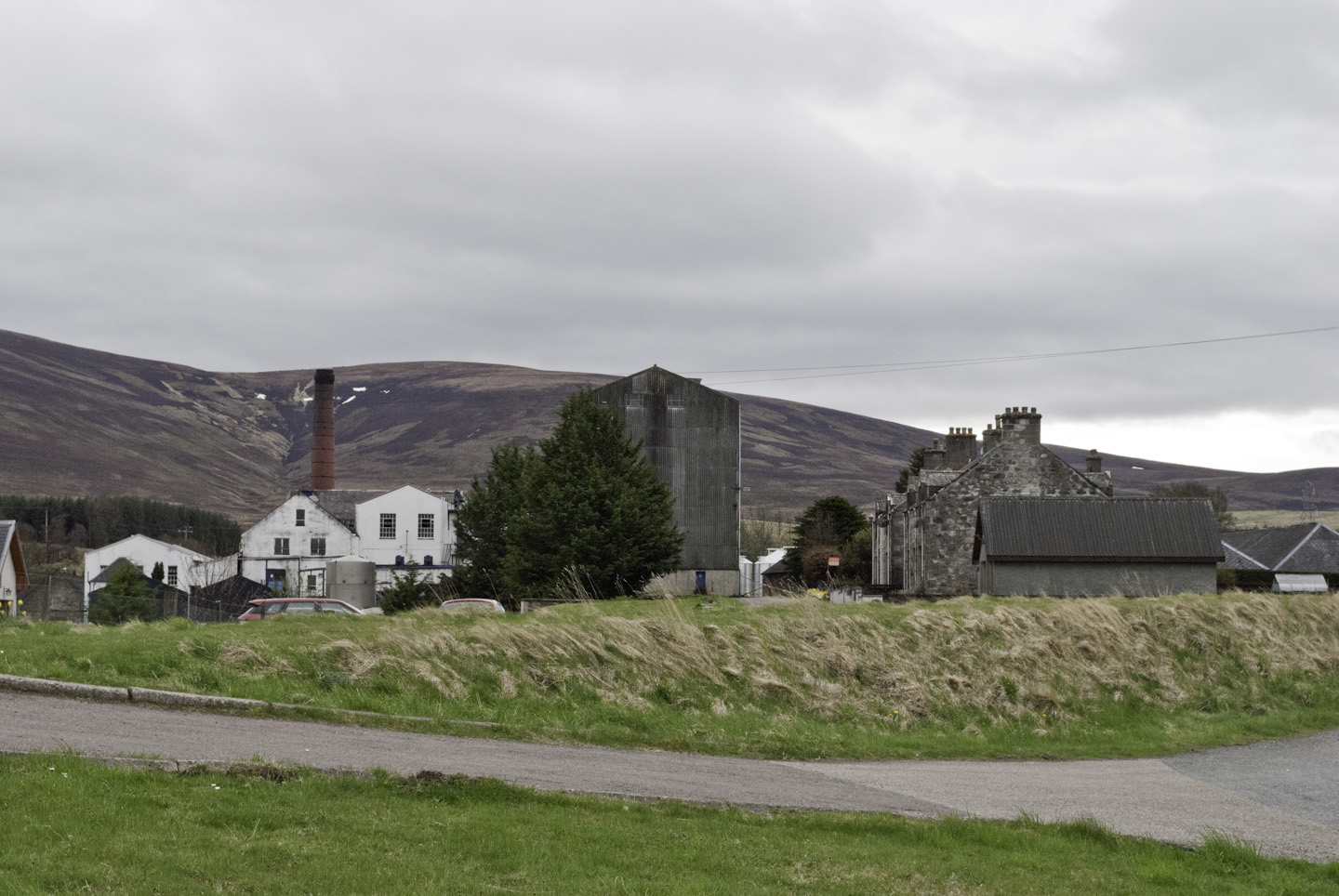

Region: Speyside
- Location: Cromdale, Scotland
- Owner: Inver House Distillers
- Founded: 1824
- Status: Active
- Water source: Spring on the Cromdale Hills
- No. of stills: 3 wash stills, 3 spirit stills
- Capacity: 2,000,000 litres of alcohol

Balmenach distillery is a Speyside single malt Scotch whisky and gin distillery situated in the district of Cromdale, Scotland on the banks of the River Spey. The distillery stands in beneath the nearby hill of Tom Lethendry where the Jacobites were defeated in the Battle of Cromdale in 1690.

Despite having a long history making whisky, the distillery is most well known to the public as the production site of Caorunn gin, which was first released in 2009.

The Distillery is owned by Inver House Distillers Limited, a privately owned distiller whose other distilleries include: Speyburn-Glenlivet Distillery; Knockdhu Distillery; Balblair Distillery; and, Old Pulteney Distillery.

== History ==
Balmenach distillery was established in 1824 by James McGregor, from a family of farmers and illicit distillers who resided in Tomintoul. Balmenach distillery is one of the earliest distilleries sanctioned as a result of the Excise Act 1823. In 1897 the distillery was purchased by Glenlivet.

In 1925 became part of The Distillers Company Ltd. (DCL). The distillery was served by its own railway branch off the Strathspey Railway until 1969. The distillery closed in 1941 and re-opened in 1947, following expansion of its facilities.

In 1997 Balmenach was sold to Inver House Distillers.

In 2009, distiller Simon Buley was asked by Inver House to create a gin on site at Balmenach, which became Caorunn. The botanicals for the first batch were foraged around the distillery, and included rowan berries, which gave the brand its name, Coul Blush apples and bog myrtle. Caorunn is notable for the use of a 1920s copper berry chamber in its production, which was originally used for making perfume. The bottle was designed to incorporate a five-pointed base and asterisk logo, to represent the five Scottish botanicals used in the recipe.

== See also ==
- Whisky
- Scotch whisky
- List of whisky brands
- List of distilleries in Scotland
