= Balblair distillery =

Highland single malt Scotch whisky in Edderton, Ross-shire, Scotland

Coordinates: 57°50′25.7″N 4°10′49.5″W

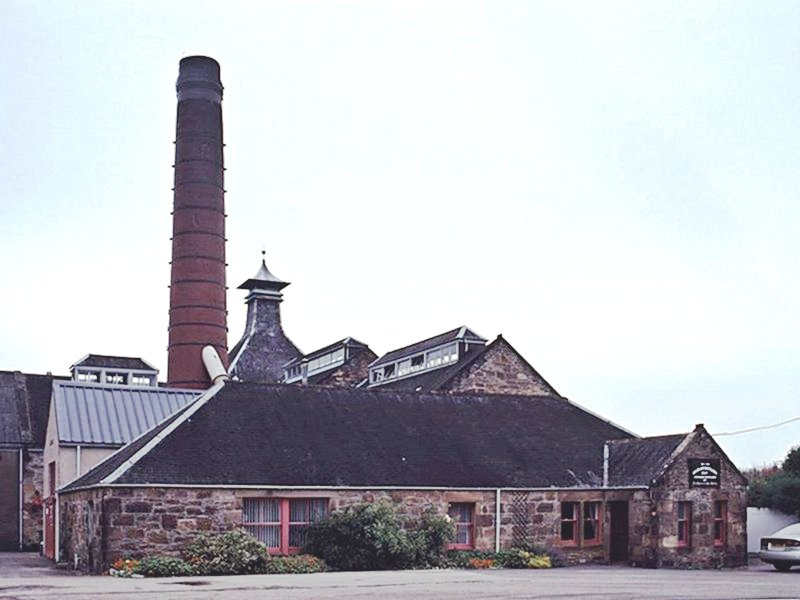
- View of Balblair Distillery

Region: Highland
- Location: Edderton
- Owner: Inver House Distillers
- Founded: 1790
- Status: Operational
- Water source: The Allt Dearg
- No. of stills: 1 wash still (20,000l); 1 spirit still (8,500l)
- Capacity: 1,800,000 litres of alcohol

Balblair distillery is a Highland single malt Scotch whisky located in Edderton, Ross-shire, Scotland.

Founded in 1790, the distillery was rebuilt in 1894 by the designer Charles C Doig to be closer to the Edderton Railway Station on the Inverness and Ross-shire Railway line. However, so good was the original water source that the rebuilt distillery chose to ignore a nearby burn in favour of the original Ault Dearg burn. To this day, the Balblair Distillery continues to use this original water source.

== History ==
Balblair Distillery is the oldest working distillery in the Highlands and fourth oldest in Scotland. It was officially established in 1790 by John Ross. He ran Balblair as a thriving business and in 1824 he was joined by his son, Andrew. The distillery stayed in the Ross family until 1894, when the tenancy was taken over by Alexander Cowan. The distillery was rebuilt in 1894 by the designer Charles C Doig to be closer to the Edderton Railway Station on the Inverness and Ross-shire Railway line. However, so good was the original water source that the rebuilt distillery chose to ignore a nearby burn in favour of the original Ault Dearg burn. To this day, the Balblair Distillery continues to use this original water source.

In 1948 the freehold was bought by Robert Cumming, who promptly expanded the distillery and increased production. Cumming ran the distillery until he retired in 1970 when he sold it to Hiram Walker.

In 1996 Balblair Distillery was purchased by Inver House Distillers Limited, whose other distilleries include the Speyburn-Glenlivet Distillery, Knockdhu Distillery, Old Pulteney Distillery and Balmenach Distillery.

Balblair has one of the oldest archives in distilling, with the first ledger entry dated 25 January 1800. John Ross himself penned that entry, which read: “Sale to David Kirkcaldy at Ardmore, one gallon of whisky at £1.8.0d”.

Balblair used to release their whisky by vintage, but in April 2019 they started to release a core range of age statement whiskies. This includes but is not limited to a 12, 15, 18, 21 and 25 year old.

Current production is 1.5 million litres, the bulk of which goes to blending.

Following its appearance in several scenes in the Ken Loach 2012 film The Angels' Share, Balblair opened a visitor centre in its former malting building. As well as containing a shop, the visitor centre is the starting point for regular tours of the distillery.

== Whisky ==
Balblair current range:

- Balblair 12 Year Old
- Balblair 15 Year Old
- Balblair 18 Year Old
- Balblair 21 Year Old
- Balblair 25 Year Old

== See also ==
- Whisky
- List of whisky brands
