= Meikle Ferry railway station =

Short-lived railway station in Dornoch, Sutherland

Meikle Ferry
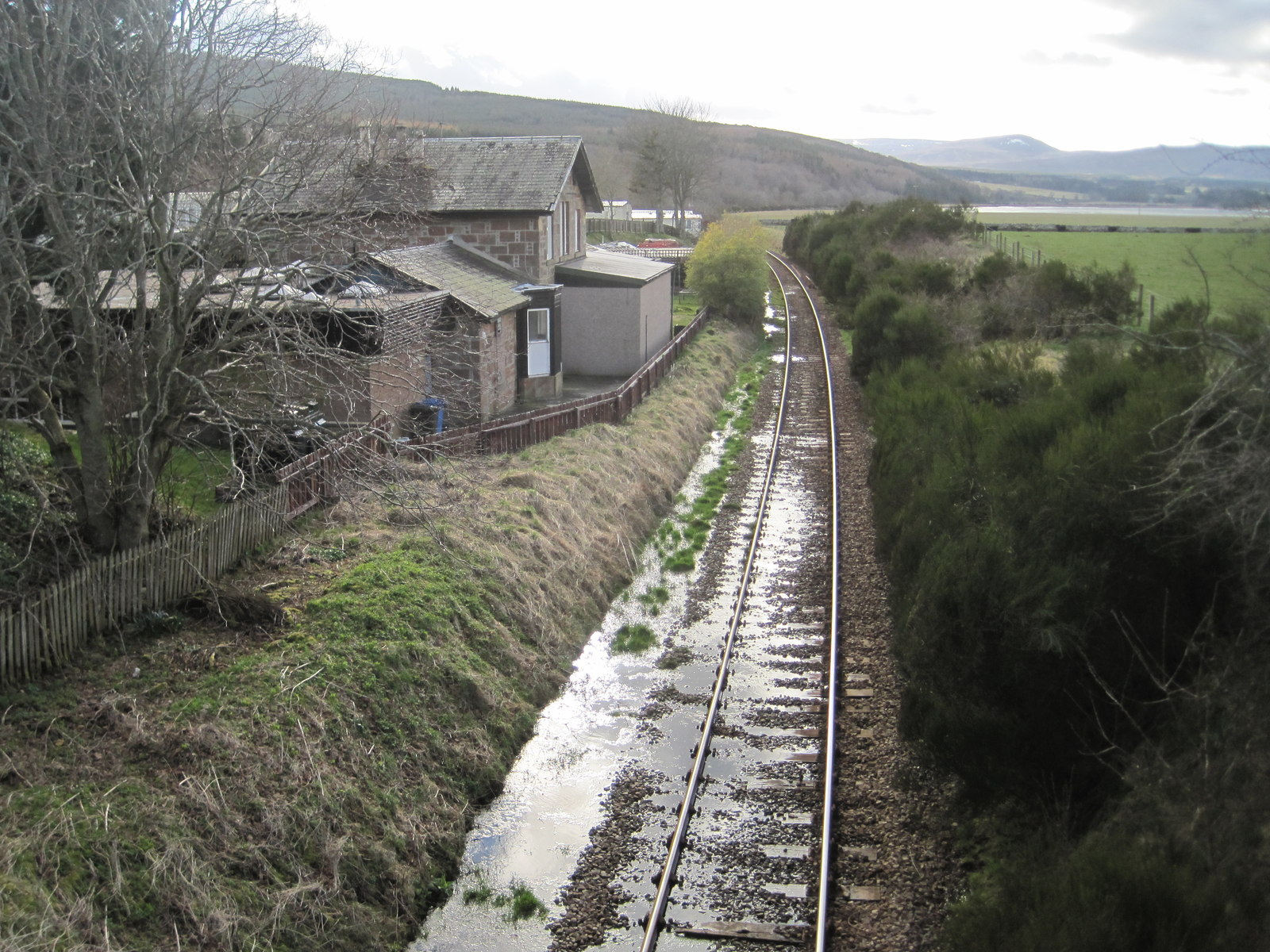
- The site of the station in 2015

General information
- Location: Dornoch, Sutherland; Scotland
- Coordinates: 57.8315°N 4.1089°W
- Grid reference: NH748843
- Platforms: 1

Other information
- Status: Disused

History
- Original company: Inverness and Aberdeen Junction Railway
- Pre-grouping: Highland Railway

Key dates
- 1 June 1864: Opened
- 1 January 1869: Closed
Location

Meikle Ferry railway station served the town of Dornoch, Sutherland, Scotland from 1864 to 1869 on the Inverness and Ross-shire Railway.

== History ==
The station opened on 1 June 1864 by the Inverness and Aberdeen Junction Railway. This was a short lived station that was only open for five years, closing to passengers and goods traffic on 1 January 1869 as the railway extended to Bonar Bridge station (Now Ardgay).

Between 2008 and 2014 the station building was a small privately run restaurant with bar 'The Dornoch Bridge Inn'. This closed as the local council would not allow sufficient signage from the main A9, and most traffic passed it by. Almost all customers were locals or stayed at the local caravan site. In the photograph here, taken from the Dornoch Bridge itself which carries the A9 over the railway and the Dornoch Firth, the Inn toilets can be seen built on the old platform.

Preceding station	Historical railways	Following station
Tain; Line and station open	Highland Railway; Inverness and Ross-shire Railway	Edderton; Line open, station closed
