= Edderton =

Coordinates: 57.83114°N 4.17026°W

Edderton: Scottish Gaelic: Eadardan
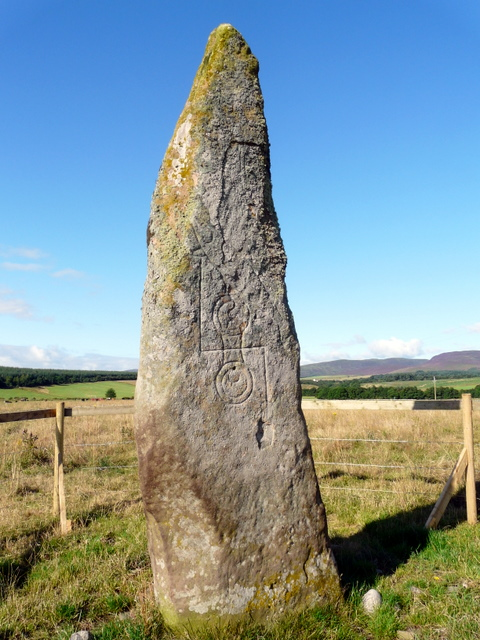
- Clach Biorach (The Pointed Stone). A Bronze-age stone with much later Pictish carvings.

- Location within the Ross and Cromarty area
- Population: 388
- OS grid reference: NH712844
- Council area: Highland
- Country: Scotland
- Sovereign state: United Kingdom
- Post town: Tain
- Postcode district: IV19 1
- Police: Scotland
- Fire: Scottish
- Ambulance: Scottish
- UK Parliament: Caithness, Sutherland and Easter Ross
- Scottish Parliament: Caithness, Sutherland and Ross

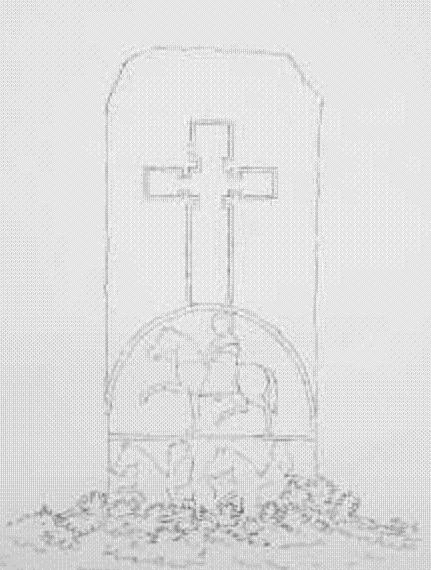
One side of the Edderton cross slab, which lies in the old village church.

Edderton (Scottish Gaelic: Eadardan) is a village near Tain, lying on the shores of the Dornoch Firth, Easter Ross and is in the Highland council area of Scotland. It has approximately 388 inhabitants. It is the location of the Balblair Distillery, and of the Edderton Cross Slab, a Class III Pictish stone, which lies in the old churchyard of the village. A quarter of a mile outside the town lies another stone, the Clach Biorach, a Class I Pictish stone.

The former Ardmore House was a home of the chiefs of clan Ross.

Balblair distillery off Station Road, Edderton, officially dates back to 1790 (but was distilling before then): in 1846, it was recorded that it consumed 120 bushels of malt weekly, producing 240 gallons of whisky, of very high repute. The distillery and village were served by the Inverness and Aberdeen Junction Railway from 1864 until Edderton railway station closed in 1960.
