= Speyburn distillery =

Speyside Scottish whisky distillery in Rothes, Moray, Scotland

Coordinates: 57°32′12″N 3°12′55″W

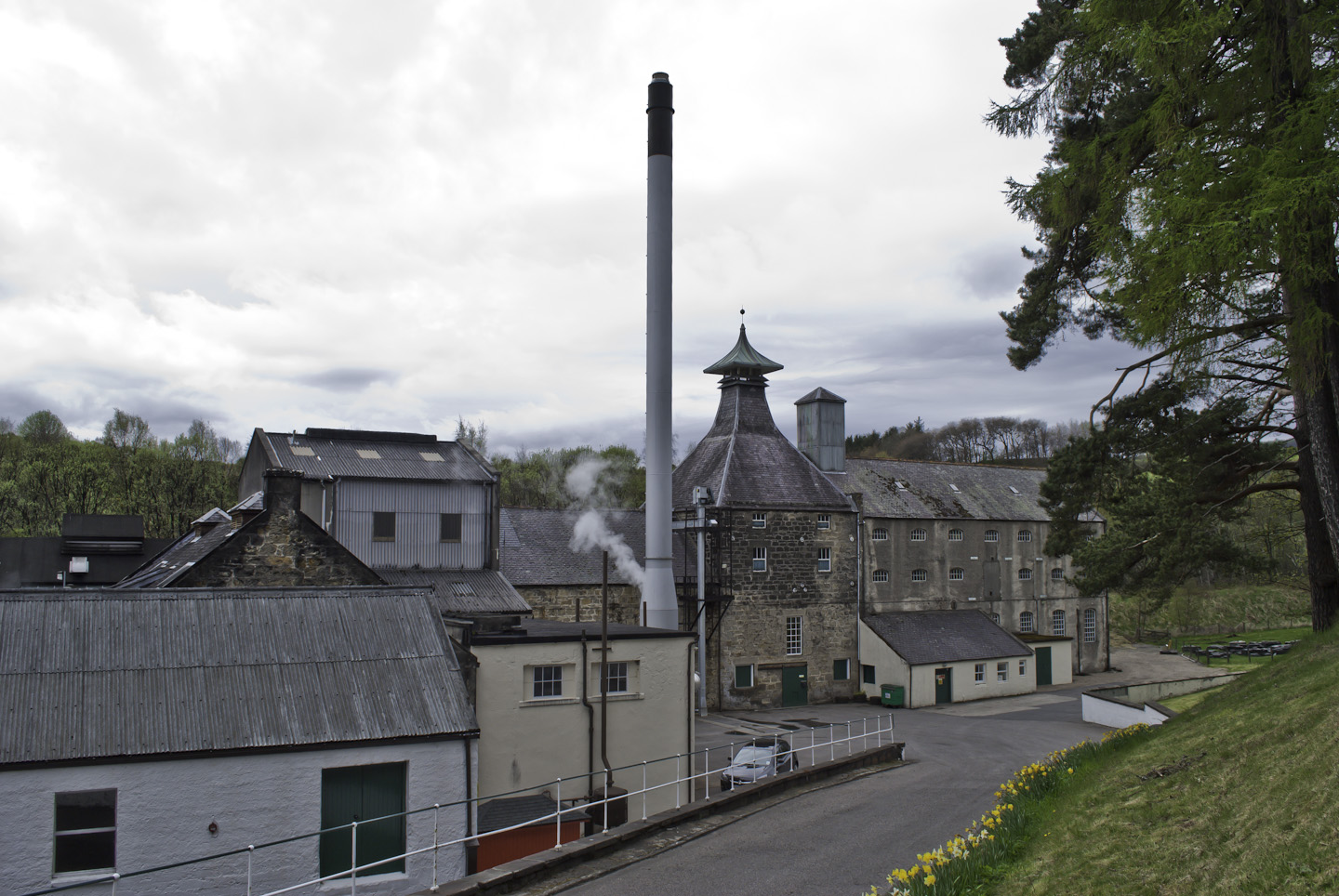

Region: Speyside
- Owner: Inver House Distillers
- Founded: 1897
- Status: Active
- Water source: Granty Burn
- No. of stills: 1 wash still 2 spirit stills
- Capacity: 4,100,000 litres
- Website: www.speyburn.com

Speyburn distillery is a Speyside Scottish whisky distillery, in Rothes, Moray, Scotland.

== History ==
Speyburn distillery was founded in 1897 by John Hopkins & Company for the sum of £17,000. The site was chosen by John Hopkins himself for its unpolluted water supply from the Granty Burn, a minor tributary of the River Spey. Hopkins appointed the famous distillery architect Charles C Doig to design the distillery and to this day Speyburn has its classic pagoda ventilator, a hallmark of Doig's design.

The proprietors, keen to have production started to ensure that the first fillings could bear the date 1897 - Queen Victoria's Diamond Jubilee - had scheduled production to begin on 1 November 1897. However, due to delays, the stills did not run until 15 December. When production finally began, the still house was without doors and windows. Under the watchful eye of the distillery's manager, John Smith, the first spirit was run off in a violent snow storm with the distillery men working in overcoats and mufflers to protect them from the elements. However, the proprietors succeeded in achieving their ambition and one butt was produced and bonded bearing the date 1897.

Speyburn Speyside Single Malt Scotch whisky is exported throughout the world and it is currently the number 9 best selling single malt whisky in the USA.

The distillery is owned by Inver House Distillers Limited, a distiller whose other distilleries include Old Pulteney Distillery, Knockdhu Distillery, Balblair Distillery, and Balmenach Distillery.

== Awards ==
San Francisco World Spirits Competition 2020

- Speyburn Arranta Casks - Silver
- Speyburn 10 Years Old - Gold
- Speyburn 15 Years Old - Gold
- Speyburn 18 Years Old - Gold

World Whiskies Awards 2019

- Speyburn 15 Years Old - Gold

International Wine & Spirits Competition 2019

- Speyburn Arranta Casks - Silver
- Speyburn 15 Years Old - Silver
- Speyburn 18 Years Old - Silver

Ultimate Spirits Challenge 2019

- Speyburn Arranta Casks - 95 Points, Great Value, Tried & True
- Speyburn 10 Years Old - 87 Points
- Speyburn 15 Years Old - 95 Points, Great Valie
- Speyburn 18 Years Old - 93 Points

International Spirits Challenge 2018

- Speyburn 10 Years Old - Silver
- Speyburn 15 Years Old - Silver

International Wine & Spirits Challenge 2018

- Speyburn Bradan Orach - Silver
- Speyburn 15 Years Old - Silver
- Speyburn 10 Years Old - Silver

Ultimate Spirits Challenge 2018

- Speyburn 10 Years Old - Speyburn - 95 points in Scotch/Single Malt/Speyside competition
- Speyburn Arranta Casks - Scotch/Single Malt/Speyside competition scores - Speyburn Arranta Casks
- Speyburn 15 Years Old - Scotch/Single Malt/Speyside competition scores - Speyburn
- Speyburn Bradan Orach - Scotch/Single Malt/Speyside competition scores - Speyburn Bradan Orach

San Francisco Wine & Spirits Challenge

- Speyburn 15 Years Old - Double Gold
- Speyburn 12 Years Old - Gold
- Speyburn 25 Years Old - Gold
- Speyburn 10 Years Old - Silver
- Speyburn Bradan Orach - Bronze

World Whisky Awards 2018

- Speyburn Bradan Orach - Bronze

International Wine and Spirit Competition 2017

- Speyburn Arranta Casks - Gold
- Speyburn 15 Years Old - Silver
- Speyburn Bradan Orach - Silver
- Speyburn 10 Years Old - Silver

New York International Spirits Competition 2017

- Speyburn Bradan Orach - Double Gold

New York International Spirits Competition 2017

- Speyburn 10 Years Old - Silver
- Speyburn Arranta Casks - Silver

San Francisco World Spirits Competition 2017

- Speyburn Arranta - Double Gold
- Speyburn 10 Years Old - Gold

International Spirits Challenge 2017

- Speyburn Arranta Casks – Gold
- Speyburn 10 Years Old - Silver
- Speyburn Bradan Orach - Silver

Ultimate Spirits Challenge 2017

- Speyburn Arranta - 94 points, Great Value
- Speyburn Bradan Orach - 91 points, Great Value
- Speyburn 10 Years Old - 89 points

IWSC 2016

- Speyburn 10 Years Old – Silver
- Speyburn Bradan Orach - Silver
- Speyburn Arranta Casks – Silver Outstanding

International Spirits Challenge 2016

- Speyburn 10 Years Old – Silver
- Speyburn Bradan Orach - Silver
- Speyburn Arranta Casks - Gold

Ultimate Spirits Challenge 2016

- Speyburn 10 Years Old, Tried & True
- Speyburn Bradan Orach 96 points, Great Value

San Francisco World Spirits Competition 2016

- Speyburn 10 Years Old – Silver
- Speyburn Arranta Casks - Silver

New York World Spirits Competition

- Speyburn – Speyside Distillery of the Year

== See also ==
- Whisky
- Scotch whisky
- List of whisky brands
- List of distilleries in Scotland
