= Chang–Everton Football Academy =

Chang-Everton Football Academy
- Founded: 2009
- Ground: ThaiBev Football Centre
- Owner: Thai Beverage Public Company Ltd.

The Chang–Everton Football Academy is a football academy operated by Everton F.C., Thai Beverages and the Bangkok Metropolitan Administration (BMA).

The academy was one of the obligations of the football club's sponsorship deal with Chang Beer. Everton also send officials and coaching staff to Chonburi F.C., Ratchapracha F.C. and Bangkok Football Academy.

Everton academy director Ray Hall said that Everton F.C. want to be the first club to have a professional Thai football player.
