= Clach Biorach =

Neolithic standing stone in Scotland

Coordinates: 57°50′13″N 4°10′33″W

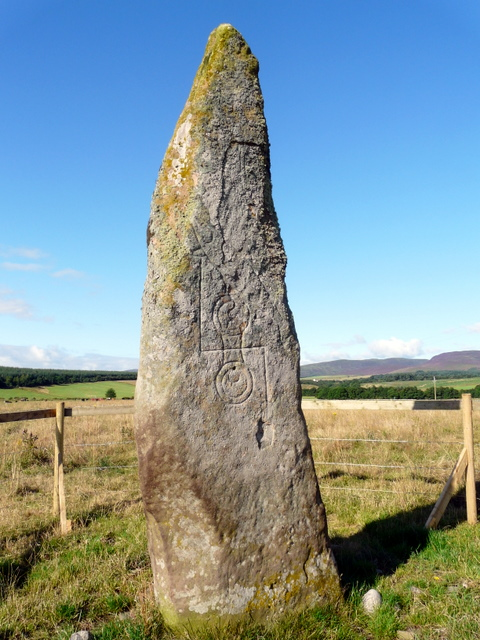
Clach Biorach (The Pointed Stone), Edderton

Clach Chairidh, alternatively named Clach Biorach (from Scots Gaelic, meaning 'the Pointed Stone'), is a Class I Pictish stone located in a field near the village of Edderton in Easter Ross.

== Description ==
The standing stone was probably erected at some time in the Neolithic to Middle Bronze Age (4000 BC to 1500 BC), and Pictish symbols were later engraved at some time in the Late Iron Age to Early Medieval period (500 AD to 700 AD) on its north face. The symbols are a salmon above a double-disc with a Z-rod. When first recorded in 1780, a circle which is no longer visible was shown below on the left, which could have been part of a mirror. It is sandstone, 3.13 metres (10 ft 3 in) high, and at the base it has a width of 1.07 metres (3 ft 6 in) and depth of 0.46 metres (1 ft 6 in).

== Gallery ==
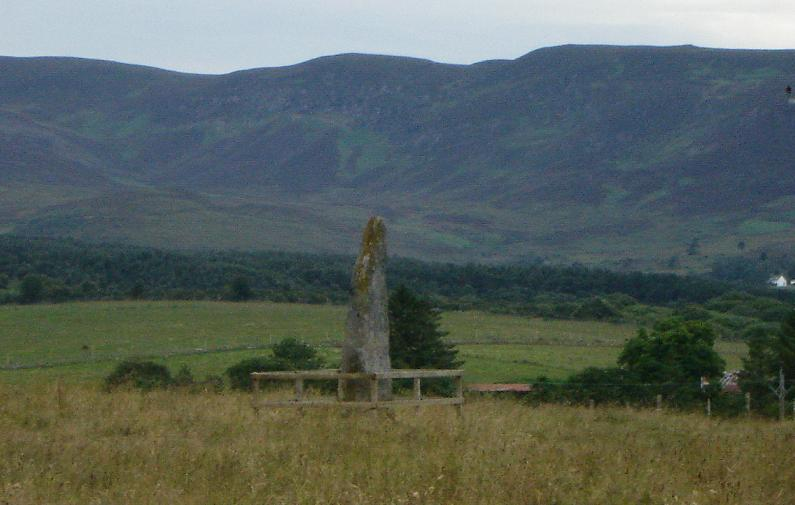
A distance photograph of Clach Biorach taken in July 2006

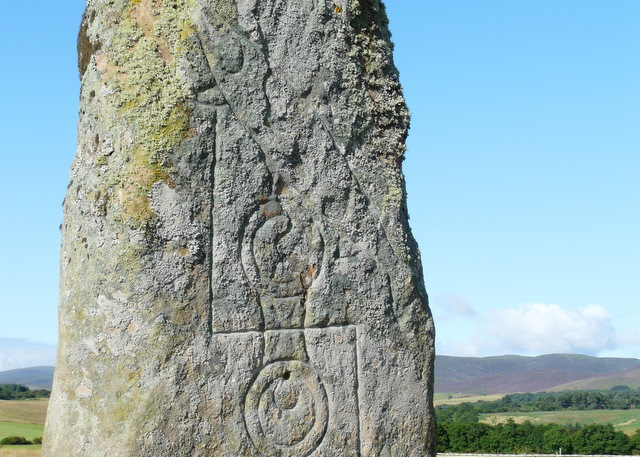
The Pictish engravings in detail

== See also ==
- Celtic art
- Edderton Cross Slab
