= Edderton Cross Slab =

Coordinates: 57°50′1″N 4°10′24″W

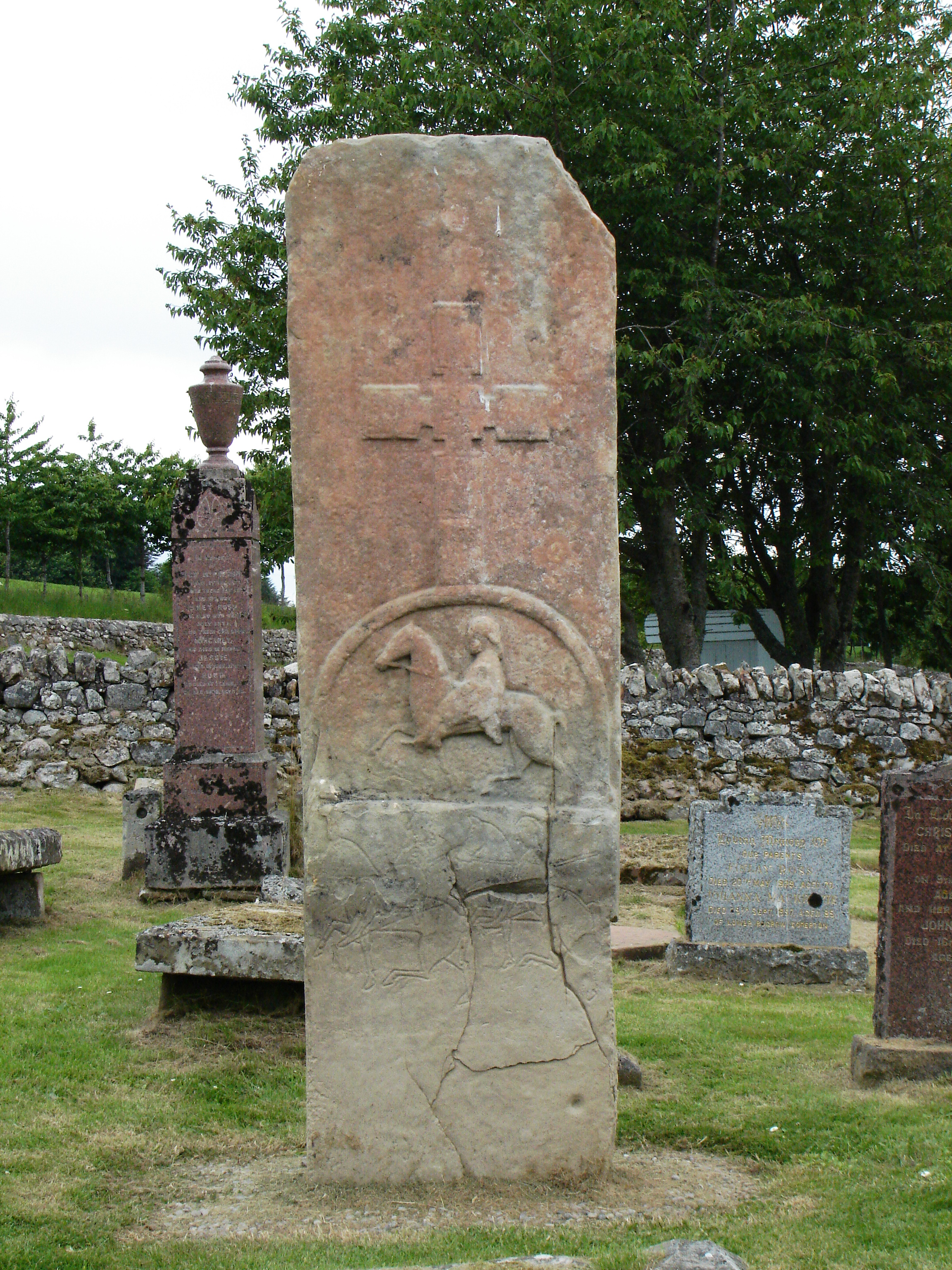
Modern photograph.

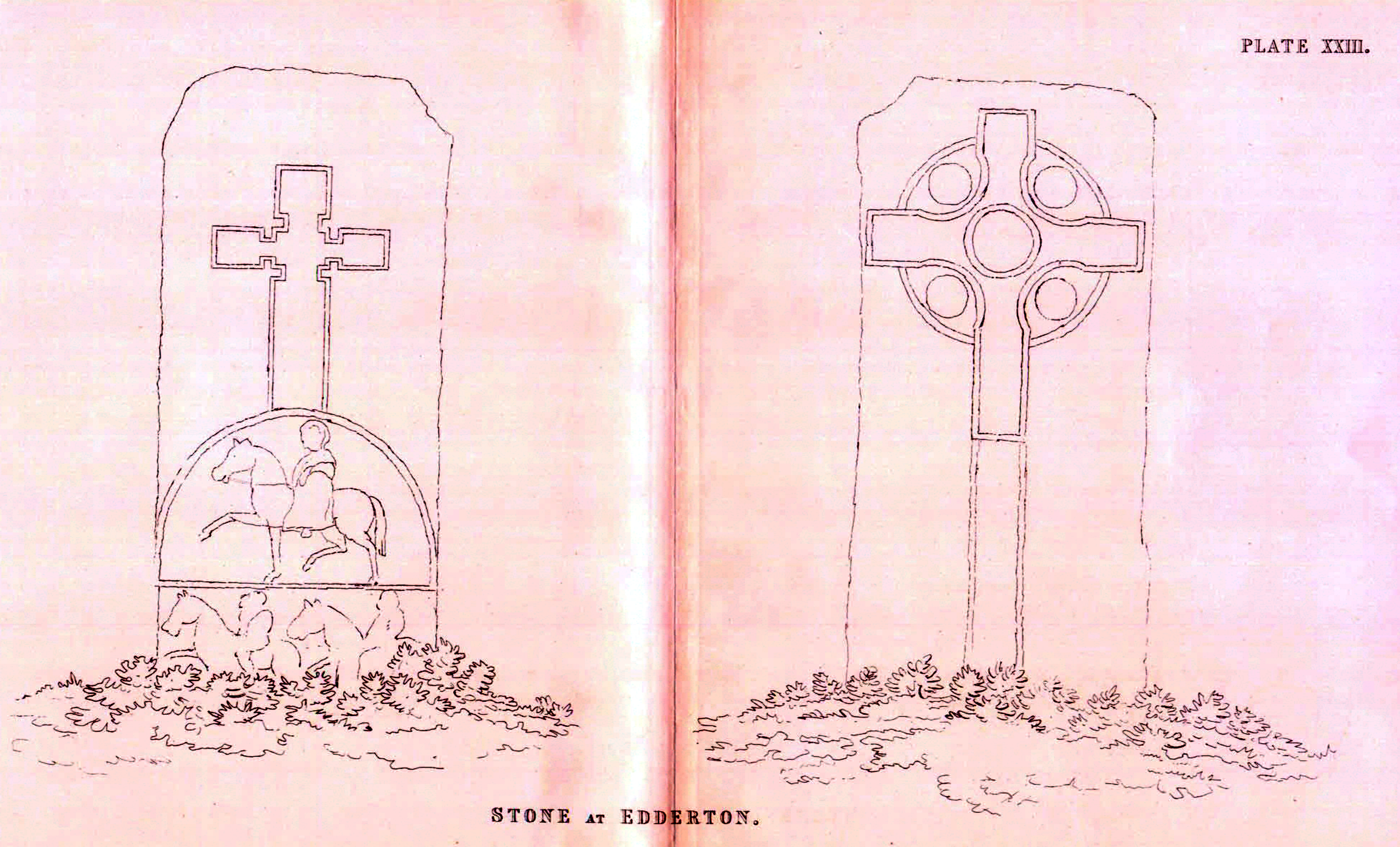
A 19th century illustration of the stone by Charles Carter Petley (drawn 1811-2; published1857).

Edderton Cross Slab is a Class III Pictish stone standing in the old graveyard of the village of Edderton, Easter Ross. The stone is of red sandstone. On the western side there is an undecorated but elegant celtic cross, the circles within its rings emphasised by being left in relief. On the eastern side there is another cross on the upper half, standing on a semi-circular base or arch, within which is a horseman in relief, with two further riders incised below. The slab was formerly sunk considerably deeper in the earth, concealing the lower two horsemen, but has recently been raised to its presumed original height (notice the lack of lichen on the lower half in the accompanying photograph).

This monument should not be confused with the Edderton Symbol Stone, or Clach Biorach ("Pointed Stone"), a red sandstone pillar of Bronze Age origin with Pictish symbols incised on it, which stands in a field near the village of Edderton a little to the west.

Further fragments of early medieval cross-slabs, in poor condition, from Edderton churchyard, are preserved in Tain Museum.

== See also ==
- Celtic art
