= Mid Fearn Halt railway station =

Closed railway station in Scotland

Mid Fearn Halt

General information
- Location: Highland; Scotland
- Coordinates: 57.85824°N 4.30968°W
- Grid reference: NH 63058775

Other information
- Status: Disused

History
- Original company: Inverness and Aberdeen Junction Railway
- Pre-grouping: Highland Railway
- Post-grouping: LMSR

Key dates
- 1 October 1864: Opened
- 1 April 1865: Closed
Location

Mid Fearn Halt was a small railway station in Mid Fearn in Ross-shire in Scotland. The station was provided to serve Fearn Lodge.

The station opened on 1 October 1864 when the Inverness and Aberdeen Junction Railway opened its line from Invergordon to Ardgay (then known as Bonar Bridge). (Note: The line was originally proposed by the Inverness and Ross-shire Railway but in 1862 the company was absorbed by the Inverness and Aberdeen Junction Railway who then gained authority in 1863 to build this section of line.)

The station was short lived, closing on 1 April 1865.

Despite its formal closure and withdrawal from the public timetables the halt was still used as a conditional stopping-place for the lodge and the wives and families of local railwaymen.

The station was described as Mid Fearn Halt in the Railway Clearing House handbook of 1938 but had also been known as Mid Fearn Station and West Fearn Platform .

| Preceding station | Historical railways | Following station |
|---|---|---|
| Edderton; Line open, station closed | Highland Railway; Inverness and Aberdeen Junction Railway | Ardgay; Line and station open |

== Bibliography ==
- Croughton, Godfrey; Kidner, R. W.; Young, Alan (1982). Private and untimetabled railway stations : halts and stopping places. Salisbury, Wilts.: Oakwood Press. ISBN 0853612811. OCLC 1311037585.
- Grant, Donald J. (2017). Directory of the Railway Companies of Great Britain (1st ed.). Kibworth Beauchamp, Leicestershire: Troubador Publishing Ltd. ISBN 978-1-78803-768-6.
- Quick, Michael (2023) [2001]. Railway passenger stations in Great Britain: a chronology (PDF). version 5.05. Railway & Canal Historical Society.
- The Railway Clearing House (1938). Official Hand-book of Railway Stations 1938. London: The Railway Clearing House.
- Vallance, H.A.; Clinker, C.R. (1971) [1938]. The Highland Railway. London: Pan Books. ISBN 0-330-02720-4.
