= Edderton railway station =

Disused railway station in Highland, Scotland

Edderton
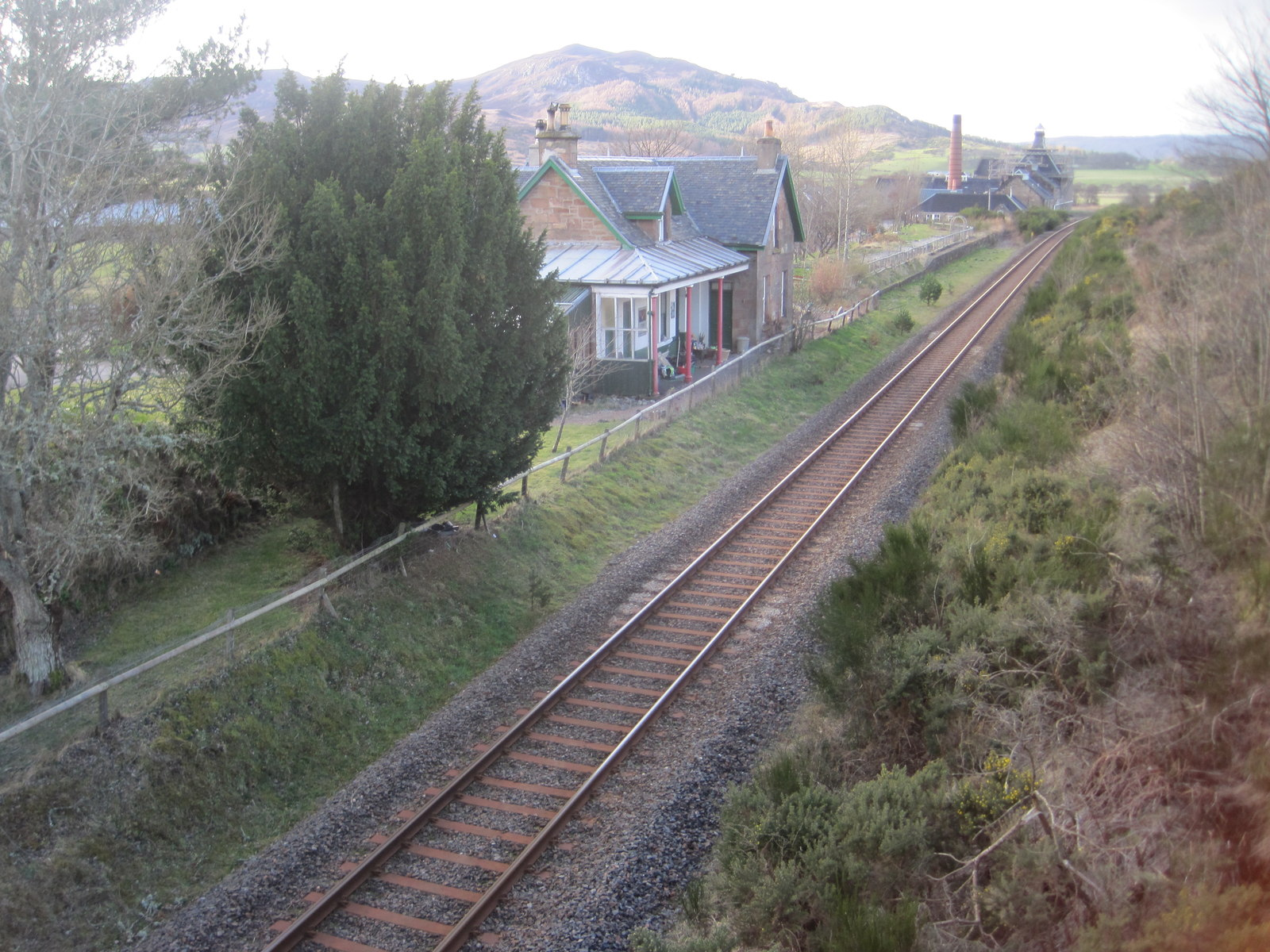
- The site of the station, looking northwest to Ardgay, in 2015

General information
- Location: Edderton, Highland; Scotland
- Coordinates: 57.8396°N 4.1781°W
- Grid reference: NH707854
- Platforms: 2 (upon opening); 1 (upon closing)

Other information
- Status: Disused

History
- Original company: Inverness and Aberdeen Junction Railway
- Pre-grouping: Highland Railway
- Post-grouping: London, Midland and Scottish Railway

Key dates
- 1 October 1864: Opened
- 13 June 1960: Closed
Location

Edderton railway station served the village of Edderton, Highland, Scotland from 1864 to 1960 on the Inverness and Ross-shire Railway.

== History ==
The station opened on 1 October 1864 by the Inverness and Aberdeen Junction Railway. The station closed to both passengers and goods traffic on 13 June 1960.

The former station building, now a private residence, can be seen on the approach to the Balblair distillery.

Preceding station	Historical railways	Following station
Meikle Ferry; Line open, station closed	Highland Railway; Inverness and Ross-shire Railway	Mid Fearn Halt; Line open, station closed
