= Inver House Distillers =

Scotch whisky distiller

Inver House Distillers Ltd.
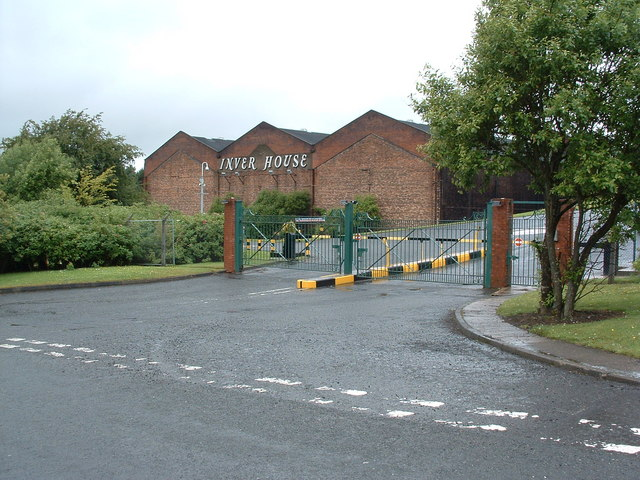
- Industry: Drink industry
- Founded: 1964
- Founder: S. S. Neuman
- Headquarters: Airdrie, North Lanarkshire, Scotland, UK
- Parent: ThaiBev

Inver House Distillers Ltd. is a Scotch whisky distiller based in Airdrie, North Lanarkshire, Scotland. The company is a subsidiary of ThaiBev. It owns and operates five whisky distilleries: Balblair, Balmenach, Pulteney, Knockdhu, and Speyburn, and sells blended whisky under the Hankey Bannister brand.

== History ==
The company was established in 1964 as a subsidiary of the American company, Publicker Industries of Philadelphia. Publicker Industries had successfully launched Inver House Rare, a brand of blended Scotch whisky in 1956. However, as a result of industry demand, there were not sufficient stocks to meet sales.

Under the chairmanship of Mr S. S. Neuman, a site was acquired at Airdrie in March 1964, and a fully integrated complex was constructed, including Glen Flagler malt distillery and Garnheath grain distillery.

Following the death of the founder, there was a period of decline in the fortunes of the company.

In 1979, Standard Brands acquired Inver House from Publicker. The operations became the subject of a management buyout in January 1988. The company was then sold by the management to become a wholly owned subsidiary of International Beverage Holdings (InterBev), the international arm of Singapore-listed Thai Beverage Public Company Limited (ThaiBev) in 2006.

Inver House started to produce the Scottish cream liqueur Heather Cream in 1980. It was relaunched in 2000 but was finally discontinued in the late 2010s.

In 2016, the company grew its production capacity by 20% to penetrate new markets in Asia and Eastern Europe (India, Kazakhstan, Poland).

== Activities ==
=== Distilleries ===
Inver House operates five whisky distilleries in Scotland: Balblair, Balmenach, Knockdhu, Old Pulteney, and Speyburn.

Inver House operated the Glen Flagler distillery (also known as Glenflagler) in Airdrie, North Lanarkshire, Scotland from 25 February 1965 to July 1985 (the site is now an Inver House warehouse facility). Garnheath distillery was a Scotch whisky grain distillery also in Airdrie, North Lanarkshire, Scotland which operated from 1965 until its demolition in July 1986.

=== Brands ===
- Single malt Scotch whisky: anCnoc, Balblair, Old Pulteney, Speyburn
- Blended Scotch whisky: Hankey Bannister, MacArthur's, Cattos
