= Knockdhu distillery =

Whisky distillery in Banffshire, Scotland

Coordinates: 57°33′48″N 2°45′33″W

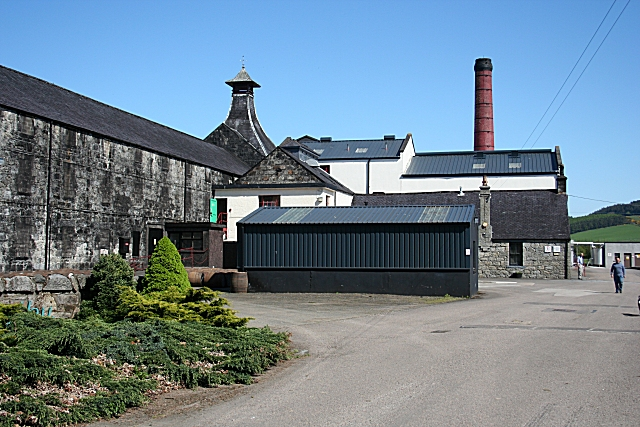

Region: Speyside
- Location: Knock, Banffshire
- Owner: Inver House Distillers
- Founded: 1894
- Status: Operational
- Water source: Spring water from Knock Hill
- No. of stills: 1 wash still 1 spirit still
- Capacity: 1,700,000 litres per annum

anCnoc
- Type: Single malt
- Age(s): 12 Years; 18 Years
- Cask type(s): American White Oak, Ex-Bourbon Casks (Main)
- ABV: 40% - 50%

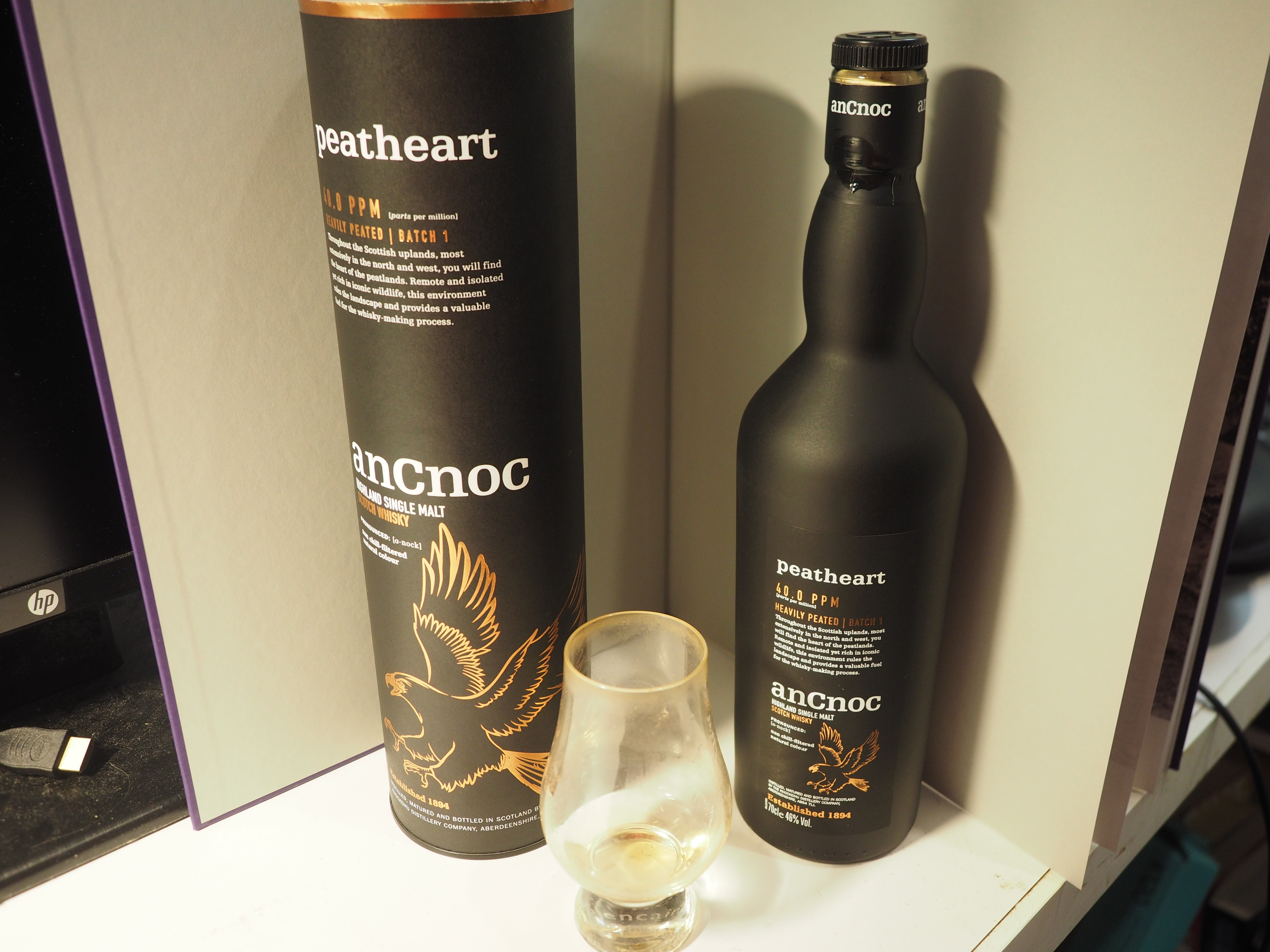
AnCnoc Peatheart is one of the most heavily peated whiskies of the Knockdhu distillery.

Knockdhu distillery (/nɒkˈduː/) is a whisky distillery situated in Knock, Banffshire and owned by Inver House Distillers Limited.

== History ==
The distillery was founded in 1893 by John Morrison, who bought the land from the Duke of Fife to produce whisky for Haig's after several springs on the southern slope of Knock Hill were discovered. The site was also chosen for its proximity to the Knock Station on the Banff branch line of the Great North of Scotland Railway (GNSR) between Aberdeen and Elgin. Not only was the new location convenient to the railway but it was also within a few miles of a district noted both for its barley and inexhaustible source of excellent peat. The distillery was built using local eye grey granite, with two coal fired stills, which are now steam heated. The two pot stills could turn out 2,500 gallons of spirit per week. It was also the first malt distillery built for the Distillers Company Ltd. It started production in 1894 and remained in continuous operation until 1931, when it was forced to close for a few years due to the economic depression. Wartime restrictions on barley forced a second closure from 1940 to 1945.

After the war, with the distillery connected to the national grid, the steam powered engine, which had been used since its founding, was retired in 1947.

Knockdhu was closed in 1983, and was sold to Inver House in 1988, after which production resumed in February 1989. Various bottling ages are available, with the most popular being 12 years old, there is also an annual vintage bottled around 14–15 years old, a 16-year-old (matured solely in second fill bourbon casks) and a 30-year-old. Previously named Knockdhu after the distillery, the whisky was renamed anCnoc (/ˈænɒk/) in 1994 to avoid confusion with Knockando.

Knockdhu Highland Single Malt Scotch Whisky is currently bottled under the Gaelic name anCnoc meaning "the hill".

== Awards ==
anCnoc Highland Single Malt Whisky from Knockdhu Distillery is a multi-award-winning whisky. Recent awards include:

World Whiskies Awards 2019

- anCnoc Peatheart – Gold

International Spirits Challenge 2018

- anCnoc Rudhan Travel Retail Exclusive – Silver
- anCnoc Peatheart – Silver

International Wine & Spirits Challenge 2018

- anCnoc 18 Years Old – Gold
- anCnoc 24 Years Old – Silver Outstanding
- anCnoc 12 Years Old – Silver

World Whisky Awards 2018

- anCnoc 2002 – Category Winner
- anCnoc Peatheart – Bronze

International Wine and Spirit Competition 2017

- anCnoc 12 Years Old – Gold
- anCnoc 18 Years Old – Silver
- anCnoc 24 Years Old – Silver Outstanding

International Spirits Challenge 2017

- anCnoc 12 Years Old – Gold
- anCnoc 18 Years Old – Silver
- anCnoc 24 Years Old – Silver

Ultimate Spirits Challenge 2017

- anCnoc 12 Years Old – 96 points, finalist, Great Value
- anCnoc 18 Years Old – 94 points, finalist
- anCnoc Cutter – 94 points, finalist

New York International Spirits Challenge 2017

- anCnoc 12 Years Old – Gold

San Francisco World Spirits Competition 2017

- anCnoc 12 Years Old – Double Gold

IWSC 2016

- anCnoc 12 Years Old – Gold
- anCnoc 18 Years Old – Silver
- anCnoc 24 Years Old – Silver Outstanding
- anCnoc Rascan – Silver
- anCnoc Barrow – Silver
- anCnoc Black Hill Reserve – Silver

International Spirits Challenge 2016

- anCnoc 12 Years Old – Gold
- anCnoc 18 Years Old – Silver
- anCnoc 24 Years Old – Silver
- anCnoc Rascan – Silver
- anCnoc Barrow – Silver
- anCnoc Black Hill Reserve – Silver

Ultimate Spirits Challenge 2016

- anCnoc 12 Years Old – 87 points
- anCnoc Rascan – 95 points

World Whiskies Awards 2016

- anCnoc 18 Years Old – Gold (Category winner)

San Francisco World Spirits Competition 2016

- anCnoc 12 Years Old – Gold
- anCnoc Rascan – Double Gold

New York World Spirits Competition 2016

- anCnoc 12 Years Old – Silver

BTI 2016

- anCnoc 12 Years Old – Gold

== See also ==
- List of distilleries in Scotland
- List of whisky brands
- Knock railway station
