= Old Pulteney distillery =

Scottish Malt Whisky Distillery in Wick

Coordinates: 58°26′04″N 03°05′05″W

Pulteney distillery
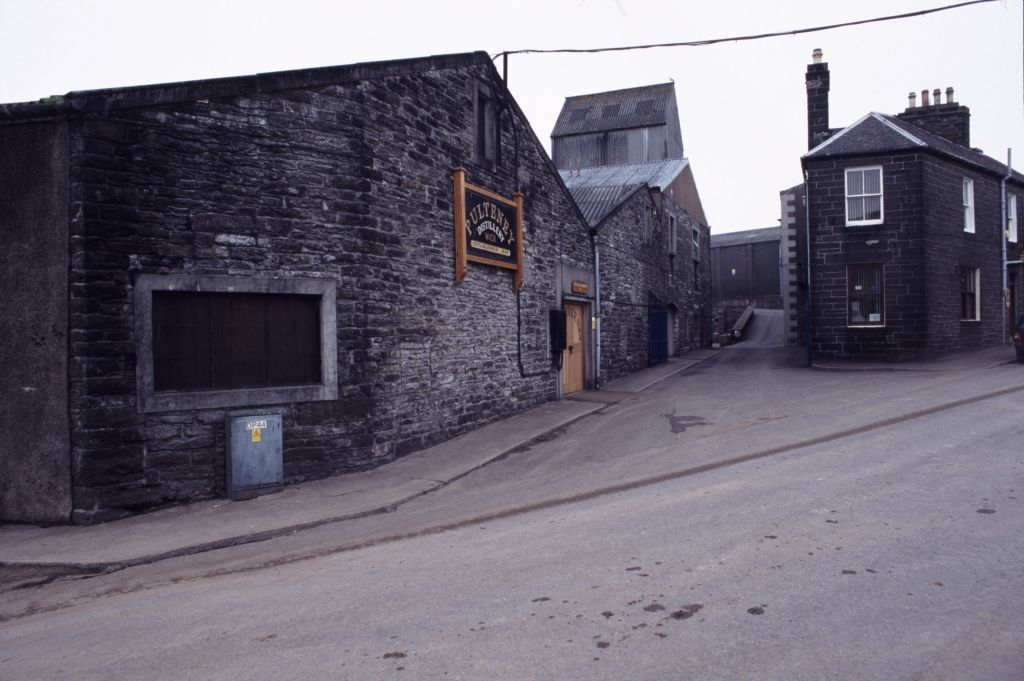

Region: Highland
- Owner: Inver House Distillers
- Founded: 1826
- Status: Active
- Water source: Loch Hempriggs
- No. of stills: 1 wash still (16,100 L); 1 spirit still (13,200 L)
- Capacity: 1,000,000 litres

Pulteney distillery is a malt whisky production and aging facility in the Pulteneytown area of Wick, Caithness, in the Highland area of Scotland. The distillery produces the Old Pulteney single malt whisky at a number of ages and has a visitor centre in Huddart Street.

== History ==
The Pulteney distillery was established in 1826 in the name of Sir William Pulteney (who died in 1805), and after whom Pulteneytown is named. The distillery was the most northerly on the Scottish mainland (the honour has been usurped by Wolfburn Distillery near Thurso) and was quite inaccessible, except by sea, when established. Barley was brought in by sea, and the whisky was shipped out the same way. Many of the distillery workers were also employed as fishermen. The herring fishing industry is no longer part of daily life in Wick but the distillery continues to operate, producing a Highland single malt with a reputation as one of the finest available. Characteristics of the whisky are attributed to exposure to sea air during maturation.

The distillery was sold to John Dewar & Sons in 1924. Dewars join Distillers Company (DLC) in 1925. The distillery closed in 1930 due to declining trade after the local parish enforced prohibition laws but re-opened in 1951 when the vote was rescinded after the law was abolished.

In 1954, Hiram Walker & Sons bought Pulteney and in 1961 sold it to Allied Breweries. In 1995, Allied sold Pulteney to Inver House Distillers.

In July 2023, the distillery released its oldest whisky to date, the 45-year-old "Old Pulteney Bow Wave".

== Production ==
The Pulteney site uses water from an old mill lade, constructed by Thomas Telford. This stream flows out of Loch Hempriggs, 3 or 4 kilometres (2 miles) to the south/southwest, and is reputed to have powered a barley mill at or near the site of the distillery.

== Awards ==
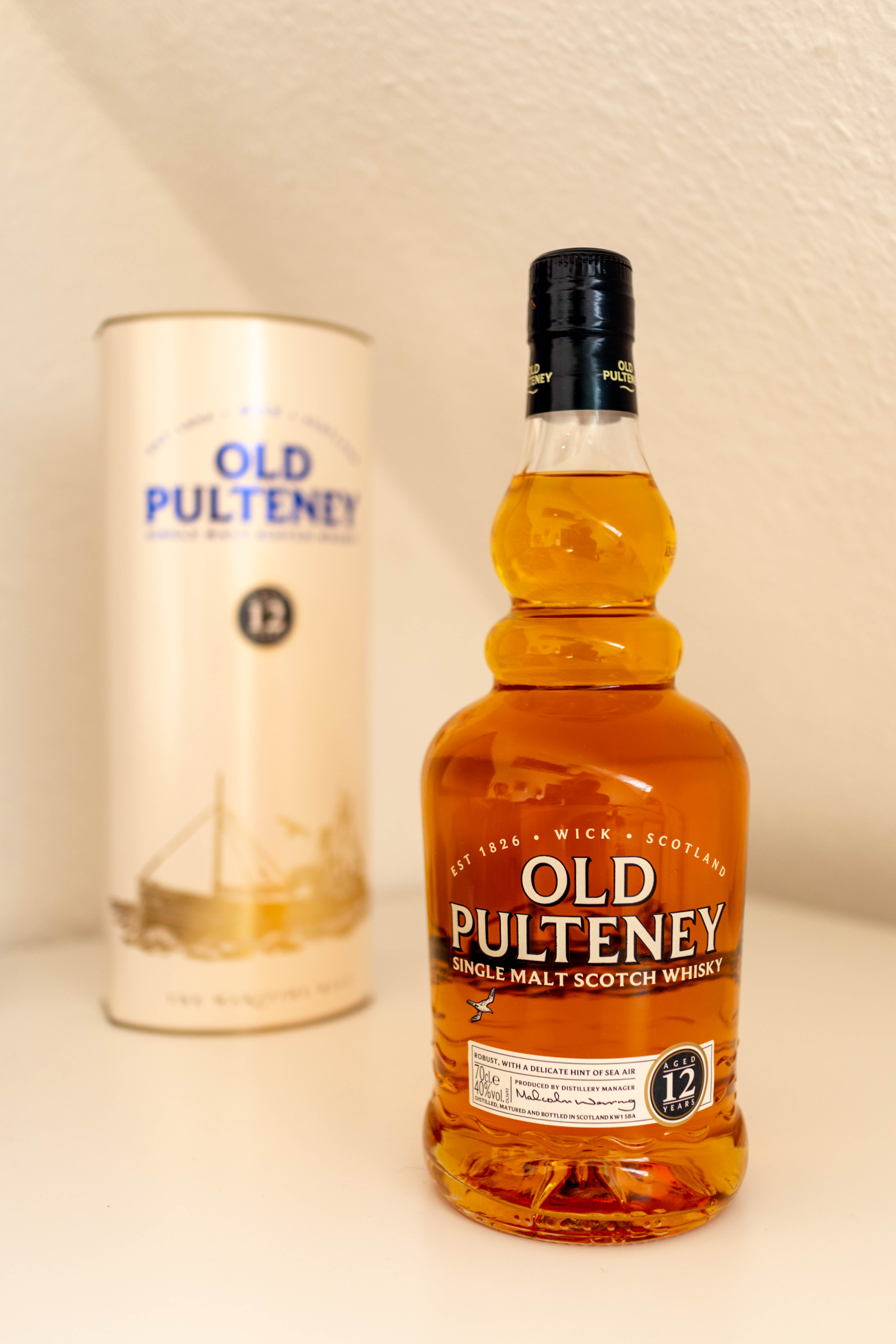
A bottle of the 12 year old Old Pulteney Single Malt Scotch whisky.

Old Pulteney 12 Years Old

- International Spirits Challenge 2021 - 94 Points
- San Francisco World Spirits Competition 2020 - Silver
- International Wine & Spirits Competition 2019 - Gold - 95pts
- International Spirits Challenge 2019 - Silver
- Whisky Masters 2019 - Gold
- International Wine and Spirit Competition 2018 - Silver Outstanding
- International Spirits Challenge 2018 - Silver
- Ultimate Spirits Challenge 2018 - 91 points
- International Spirits Challenge 2017 – Silver
- International Wine and Spirit Competition 2017 - Silver Outstanding
- International Spirits Challenge 2016 - Silver
- International Wine and Spirit Competition 2016 - Silver Outstanding

Old Pulteney Huddart

- San Francisco World Spirits Competition 2020 - Silver
- International Spirits Competition 2019 - Silver
- World Whiskies Awards 2019 - Silver

Old Pulteney 15 Years Old

- San Francisco World Spirits Competition 2020 – Silver
- International Spirits Challenge 2019 – Gold
- Whisky Masters 2019 - Gold

Old Pulteney 18 Years Old

- San Francisco World Spirits Competition 2020 - Gold
- International Spirits Competition 2019 – Silver
- Whisky Masters 2019 - Gold

Old Pulteney 25 Years Old

- San Francisco World Spirits Competition 2020 - Double Gold
- International Spirits Challenge 2019 - Gold
- International Spirits Challenge 2018 - Gold
- International Wine and Spirit Competition – Gold

Traveller’s Exclusive

Old Pulteney 16 Years Old

- International Spirits Challenge 2019 - Silver

Past awards in their collection include:

International Wine & Spirits Challenge 2018

- Old Pulteney 2006 Ex-Bourbon - Silver Outstanding

International Wine and Spirit Competition 2017

- Old Pulteney 17 Years Old – Silver

International Spirits Challenge 2017

- Old Pulteney 35 Years Old 2nd Release – Silver

Ultimate Spirits Challenge 2017

- Old Pulteney 21 Years Old - 94 points, finalist
- Old Pulteney Navigator - 92 points
- Old Pulteney Clipper - 91 points

IWSC 2016

- Old Pulteney 21 Years Old – Gold
- Old Pulteney 17 Years Old – Silver Outstanding
- Old Pulteney Noss Head – Silver Outstanding
- Old Pulteney Navigator – Silver
- Old Pulteney Duncansby Head - Silver

International Spirits Challenge 2016

- Old Pulteney 21 Years Old – Gold
- Old Pulteney 17 Years Old – Silver
- Old Pulteney Duncansby Head – Silver
- Old Pulteney 35 Years Old 1st Release – Silver
- Old Pulteney Dunnet Head - Silver

Ultimate Spirits Challenge 2016

- Old Pulteney Navigator – 92 points
- Old Pulteney 17 Years Old – 89 points

World Whiskies Awards 2016

- Old Pulteney 1989 - Worlds Best Single Malt
- Old Pulteney 17 Years Old – Silver

San Francisco World Spirits Competition 2016

- Old Pulteney Navigator - Silver

Berlin World Spirits Competition 2016

- Old Pulteney – Highland Scotch Distillery of the Year
- Old Pulteney Navigator - Silver
