= List of breweries in Ireland =

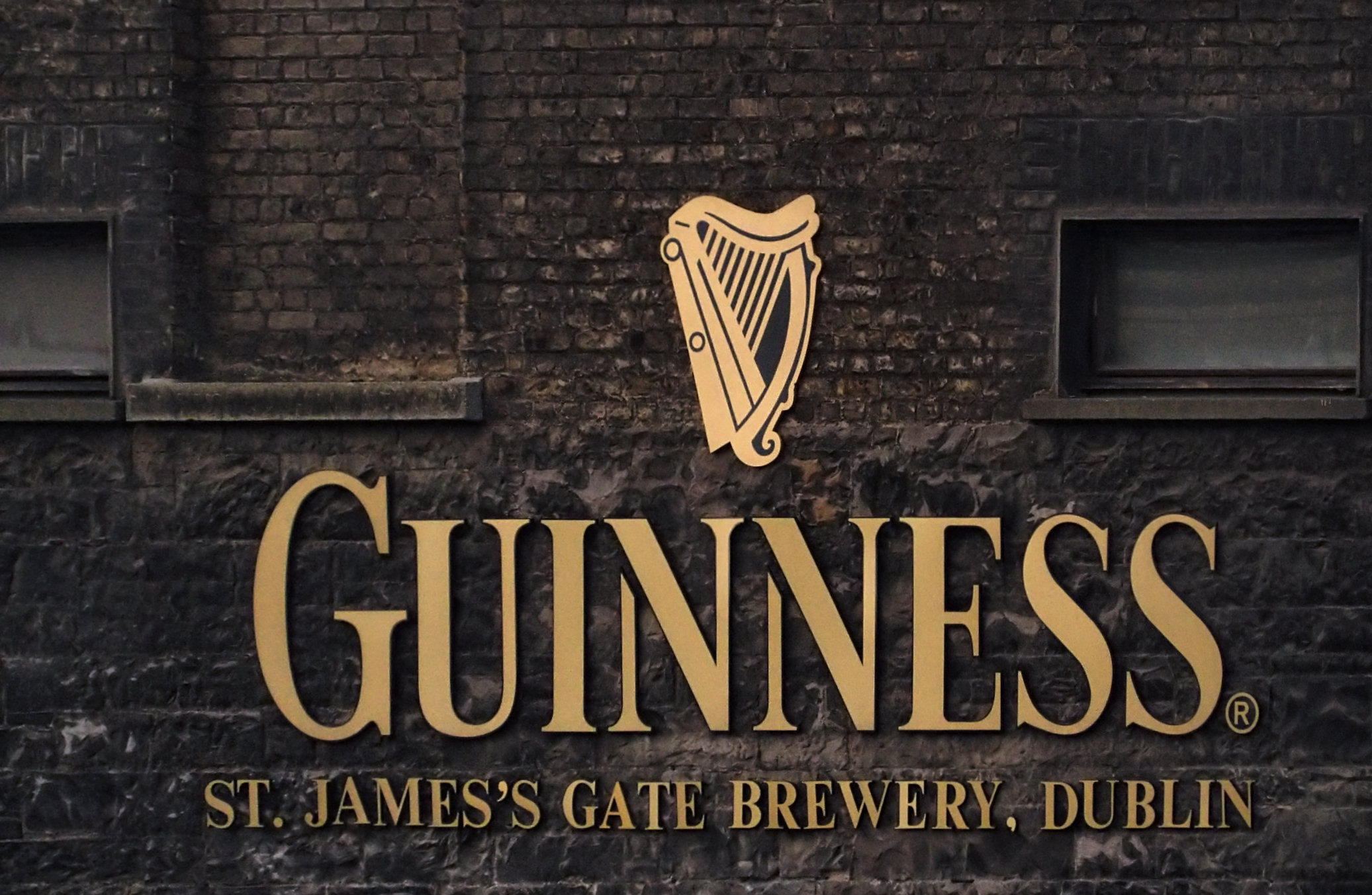
Sign at the Market Street entrance of the St James's Gate Brewery in Dublin

This is a list of breweries in Ireland. Brewing has a long history in Ireland; the country's largest city, Dublin, is home to one of the largest breweries in the world, St James's Gate Brewery, founded by Arthur Guinness more than 250 years ago.

With Irish people being the world's sixth biggest drinkers of beer, there has been plenty of opportunity for new breweries to gain a share of the market, and a wide range of craft beers began appearing in the early years of the current century, produced at microbreweries and in brewpubs across the country.

== Operational breweries ==
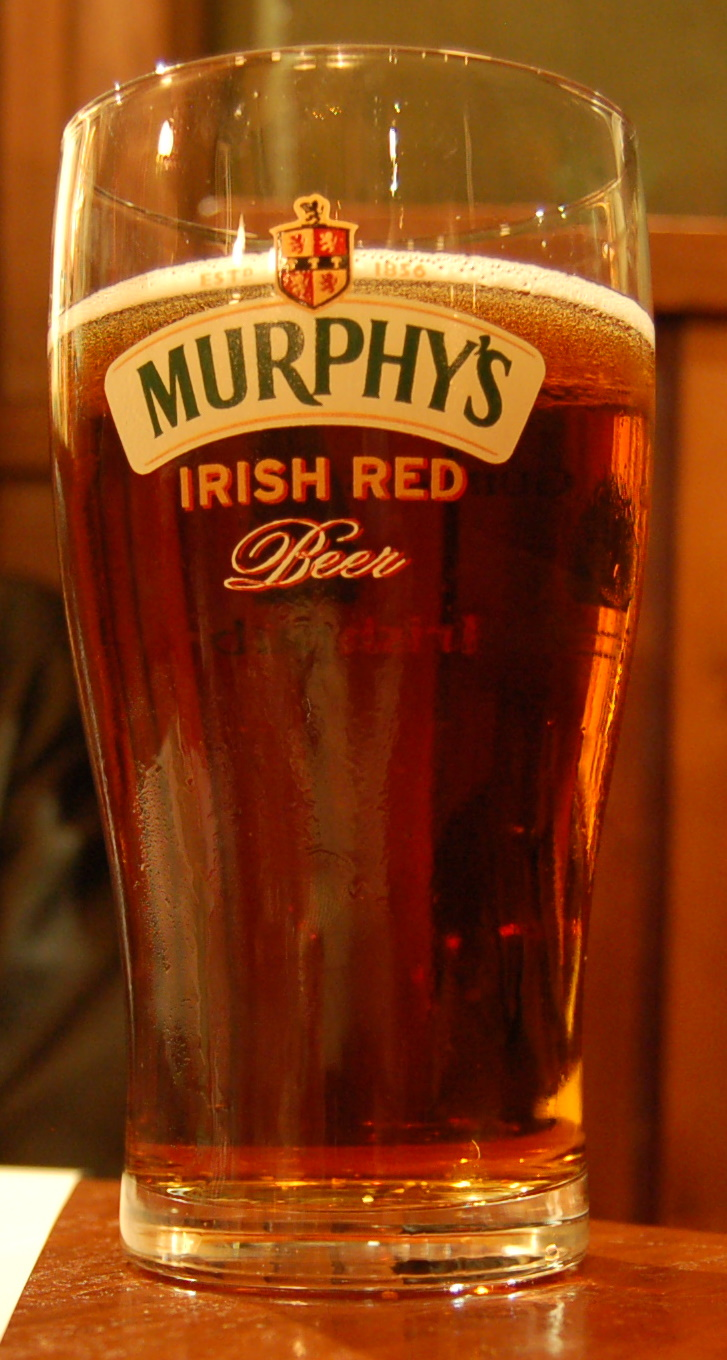
A glass of Murphy's Irish Red

As of mid-2018, in addition to international/macro-breweries such as Guinness and Heineken, there were 75 independent craft breweries in operation in the Republic of Ireland, with around 35 in operation in Northern Ireland. They include:

Breweries in Ireland
Brewery (Owner)	Town	County	Founded
12 Acres Brewery	Killeshin	Laois	2015
9 White Deer Brewery	Macroom	Cork	2013
Barrelhead Brewery	Dublin	Dublin	2006
Beer Hut Brewing Company	Kilkeel	Down	2017
Ards Brewing Company	Greyabbey	Down	2011
Ballykilcavan Brewery	Stradbally	Laois	2016
Black Donkey Brewing	Ballinlough	Roscommon	2014
Boundary Brewing	Belfast	Down (on the County Down side of the River Lagan)	2015
Armagh Brewing Company	Armagh	Armagh	2020
Blacks Brewery	Kinsale	Cork	2013
Brehon Brewhouse	Carrickmacross	Monaghan	2014
Brú Brewery	Trim	Meath	2013 (bought out by Galway Bay Brewery)
Bullhouse Brewing Company	Belfast (originally based in Newtownards)	Antrim	2016
Kinnegar Brewing	Rathmullan	Donegal	2011
Lacada Brewery	Portrush	Antrim	2015
Bridewell Brewery	Clifden	Galway	2006
Burren Brewery	Lisdoonvarna	Clare	2011
Canvas Brewery	Aglish	Tipperary	2018
Spade Town Brewery	Lurgan	Armagh	2021
Carlingford Brewing Company	Carlingford	Louth	2014
Farmageddon Brewing Company	Comber	Down	2014
Carlow Brewing Company	Bagenalstown	Carlow	1996
Crafty Divils	Killorglin	Kerry	2014
Crew Brewing Company	Limerick City	Limerick	2020
Donegal Brewing Company	Ballyshannon	Donegal	2011
Dungarvan Brewing	Dungarvan	Waterford	2010
Eight Degrees Brewing	Mitchelstown	Cork	2010
Five Lamps; C&C Group	Clonmel	County Tipperary	2014
Four Provinces Brew. Co.	Kimmage	Dublin	2014
Franciscan Well Brewery (Molson Coors)	Cork	Cork	1998
Galway Bay Brewery	Galway	Galway	2005
Galway Hooker Brewery	Oranmore	Galway	2006
Guinness (Diageo)	Dublin	Dublin	1759
Hope Craft Brewery	Dublin	Dublin	2016
Heaney Farmhouse Brewery (Heaney Brewing Company)	Bellaghy	Londonderry	2016
Hercules Brewing Company (brewers of the Yardsman range)	Belfast	Down (on the County Down side of the River Lagan)	2014
Hilden Brewery	Lisburn	Antrim	1981
Inishmacsaint Brewing Company (Fermanagh Beer Company)	Derrygonnelly	Fermanagh	2010
Killarney Brewing Company	Killarney	Kerry	2015
Lough Gill Brewery	Sligo	Sligo	2015
Manor Brewing Company	Manor Kilbride	Wicklow	2013
Rye River Brewing Company	Celbridge	Kildare	2014
Mescan Brewery	Kilsallagh	Mayo	2013
Metalman Brewing Company	Waterford	Waterford	2010
Muckish Mountain Brewery	Creeslough	Donegal	2014
McCracken’s	Portadown	Armagh	2018
Heineken	Cork	Cork	1856 (as Murphy's)
O Brother Brewing	Kilcool	Wicklow	2014
Porterhouse Brewing Company, The	Dublin	Dublin	1989
Rascals Brewing Company	Rathcoole	Dublin	2013
Reel Deel Brewery	Crossmolina	Mayo	2014
Rising Sons Brewery	Cork	Cork	2012
Rough Brothers Brewing	Derry	Londonderry	2018
St. Mel's Brewing Company	Longford	Longford	2014
Torc Brewing	Killarney	Kerry	2014
Trouble Brewing	Kill	Kildare	2009
West Kerry Brewery (Beoir Chorca Dhuibhne)	Ballyferriter	Kerry	2008
Western Herd Brewing Company Ltd	Kilmaley	Clare	2015
Whitewater Brewing Company Ltd.	Castlewellan	Down	1996
Whitefield Brewery	Templemore	Tipperary	1996 (renamed from White Gypsy in 2020)
White Hag Brewery, The	Ballymote	Sligo	2014
Wicklow Brewery, The	Redcross	Wicklow	2014
Wicklow Wolf Brewing Company	Newtownmountkennedy	Wicklow	2014
Wood Key Brewing	Dublin	Dublin	2015
YellowBelly Beer	Wexford	Wexford	2015

== Notes on mergers and defunct breweries ==
- Achill Island Brewery, Achill Island, Bunacurry, Mayo, 2014-2017
- Beamish and Crawford (Heineken), Cork, 1792–2009 : relocated to Murphy's Brewery
- Boyne Brewhouse, Drogheda, 2016–2019, some brands bought by O'Haras and resumed
- Carrig Brewery, Drumshanbo, active from 2011–2019, merged with Brú Brewery in 2019 and the brewing operation moved to the latter's brewery in 2019. In late 2021, Brú Brewery and Galway Bay Brewery merged, but announced that brewing would continue in both breweries.
- J.W. Sweetman, established under that ownership in 2013 as a Dublin brewpub in 2013, has changed ownership.
- Lett's Brewery, Enniscorthy, 1864–1956. Still licensed and firm still exists but brewery inoperative.
- Macardle Moore Brewery (Diageo), Dundalk - 1850-2000
- Smithwick's (Diageo), Kilkenny, 1710–2013 : relocated to St. James's Gate

▪︎ Hillstown Brewery, Randalstown ceased operation mid 2021.

== See also ==
- Beer in Ireland
- Beer in Northern Ireland
