= Irish pub =

Licensed establishment that serves alcoholic drinks

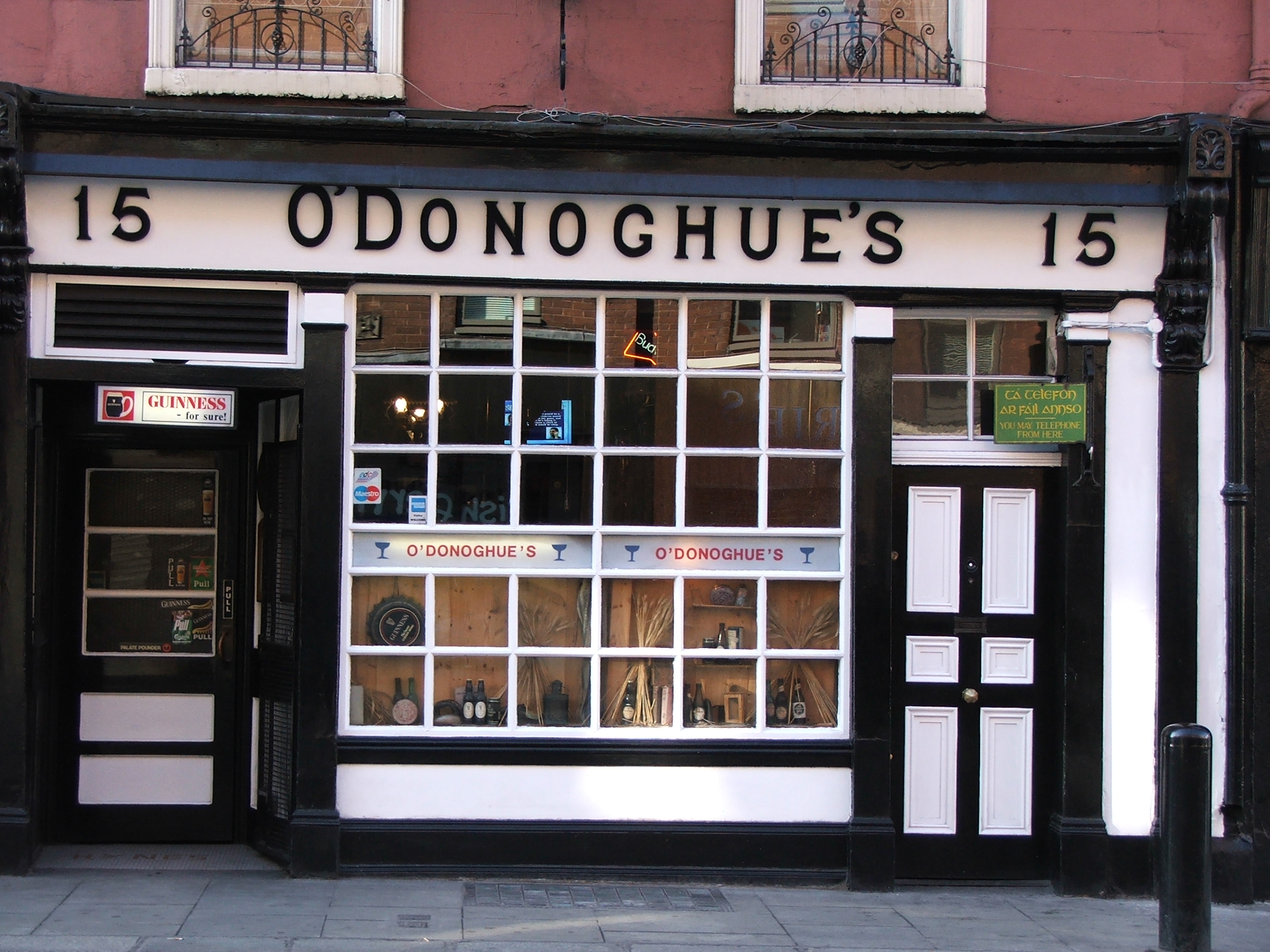
O'Donoghue's Pub, Dublin, Ireland

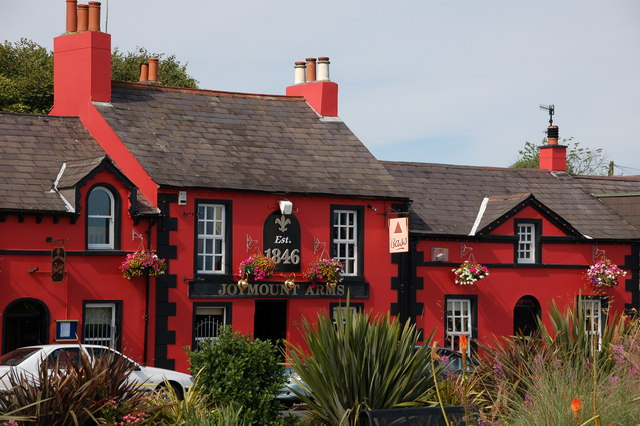
The Joymount Arms, Carrickfergus, County Antrim

In Ireland, a "pub" is an establishment licensed to serve alcoholic drinks for consumption on the premises. Irish pubs are characterised by a unique culture centred around a casual and friendly atmosphere, hearty food and drink, Irish sports, and traditional Irish music. Their widespread appeal has led to the Irish pub theme spreading around the world.

== History ==
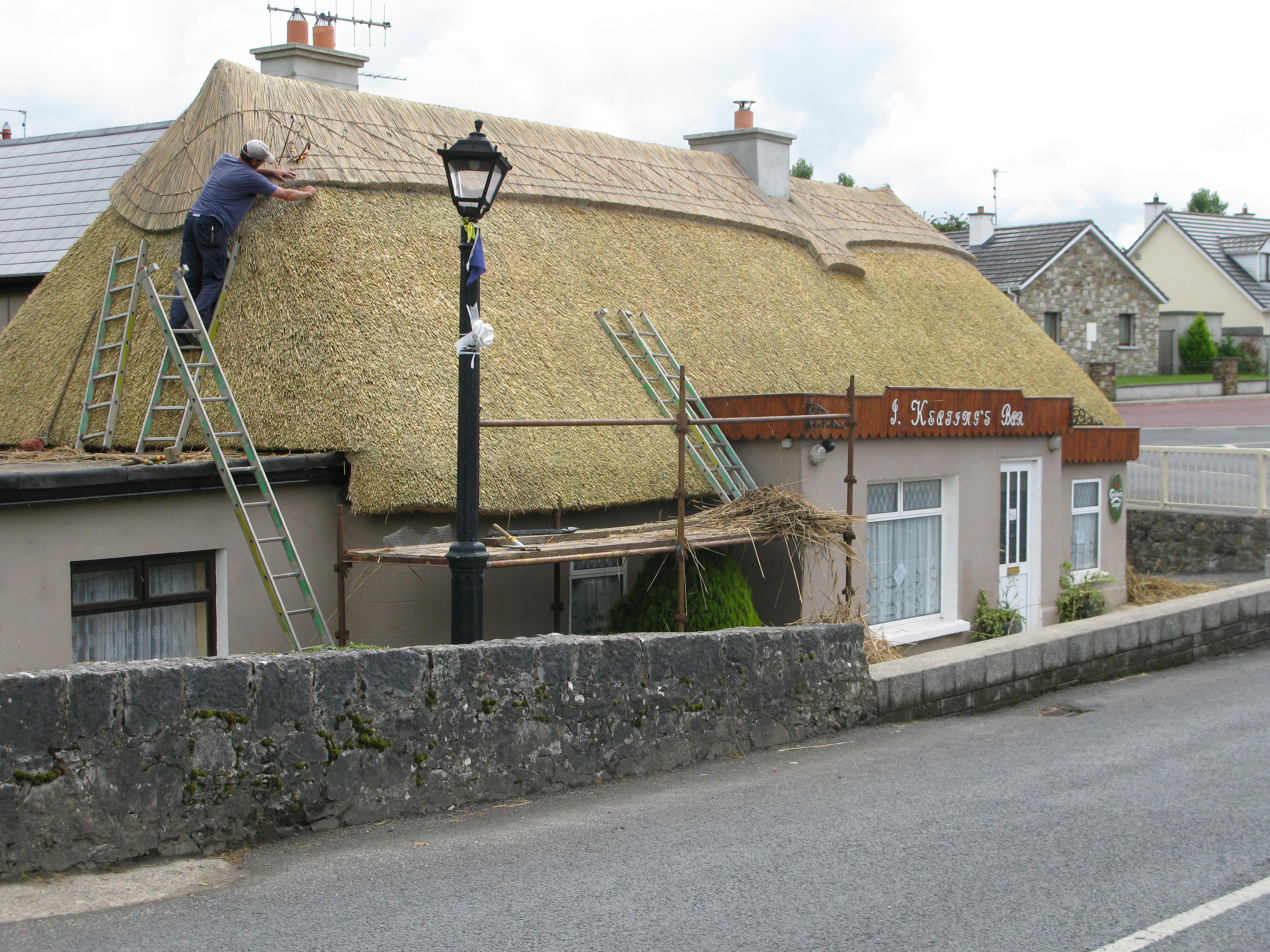
Keating's, a family-owned country pub

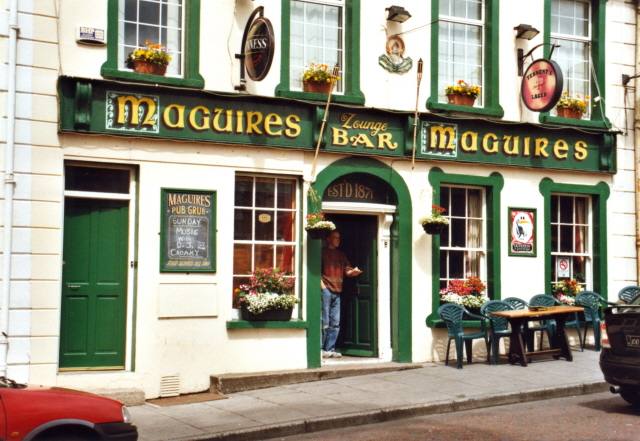
Maguire's Bar, Moville, County Donegal

Irish pubs have existed for roughly a millennium, with the title "oldest pub in Ireland" held by Seán's Bar in Athlone, County Westmeath which was established in the 10th century. The Brazen Head in Dublin City was established in 1198 and holds the title "oldest pub in Dublin". It was not until 1635 that the government required pubs to be licensed. Grace Neill's in Donaghadee, County Down, Northern Ireland, which became licensed in 1611, holds the title of "oldest licensed pub in Ireland". Irish pubs or public houses were the working man's alternative to the private drinking establishments frequented by those who could pay for entry. In 1735 the Drink on Credit to Servants Act was enacted stating that any publican who sold a drink on credit to servants, labourers or other low-wage earners had no right to seek help from the law in recovering that debt. It is the oldest law related to pubs in Ireland that is still in effect. During the 18th century, it also became illegal to be married in a pub.

Irish pubs underwent a major transformation during the 19th century when a growing temperance movement in Ireland forced publicans to diversify their businesses to compensate for declining spirit sales. Thus, the 'Spirit grocery' was established. Pub owners combined the running of the pub with a grocery, hardware or other ancillary business on the same premises (in some cases, publicans also acted as undertakers, and this unusual combination is still common in Ireland). Spirit groceries continued to operate through World War I when British law limited the number of hours that pubs could operate. Some spirit groceries continued after the war, only closing in the 1960s when supermarkets and grocery chain stores arrived. With the arrival of increased competition in the retail sector, many pubs lost the retail end of their business and concentrated solely on the licensed trade. Many pubs in Ireland still resemble grocer's shops of the mid-nineteenth century, with the bar counter and rear shelving taking up the majority of the space in the main bar area, apparently leaving little room for customers. This seemingly counter-productive arrangement is a design artefact dating from earlier operation as a spirit grocery and also accounts for the differing external appearance of British and Irish pubs. Spirit grocers in Northern Ireland were forced to choose between either the retail or the licensed trades upon the partition of Ireland in 1922, so this pub type can no longer be found in the North.

Unlike their British counterparts, Irish pubs are usually named after the current or previous owner or the street they are located on. Elaborate exterior decoration is rare, but was typified by The Irish House on Wood Quay in Dublin, which was surrounded in 1870 by coloured friezes of nationalist heroes, and with iconic traditional themes such as round towers. Parts of Ulysses were filmed in this pub in 1967. Irish pubs traditionally did not sell food as dining out was not a major part of Irish culture. That changed in the 1970s and food is now a significant part of the Irish pub experience. Over the years, individual Irish pubs have been associated with famous Irish writers and poets such as Patrick Kavanagh, Brendan Behan and James Joyce. In 2004, the Irish government passed a law outlawing smoking in pubs resulting in many pubs having outdoor smoking areas.

=== Snug ===
Irish pubs were often equipped with a snug, a more secluded or private room with seating, similar to that of a British pub's snug. A typical snug within an Irish pub, while within the pub's premises, is usually separated from the rest of the pub by walls or partitions, has or used to have a door and is equipped with a hatch for serving drinks. Often it also had a bell. Traditionally, an Irish snug was meant for women who wanted to drink in secrecy, but then the use expanded to other patrons expecting some privacy. As an example, Michael Collins was known to enjoy his drink in a snug.

== In Ireland ==
The vast majority of pubs on the island of Ireland are independently owned and licensed, or owned by a chain that does not have any brewery involvement, generally meaning that nearly every pub sells a similar but extensive range of products. This is in contrast to pubs in Great Britain, which historically has a large share of tied houses owned or otherwise connected to a specific brewery and selling its products exclusively or almost exclusively.

Following the introduction of smoking bans in the Ireland (in 2004) and Northern Ireland (in 2007) many pubs offer enclosed and often heated outdoor smoking areas.

=== Northern Ireland ===
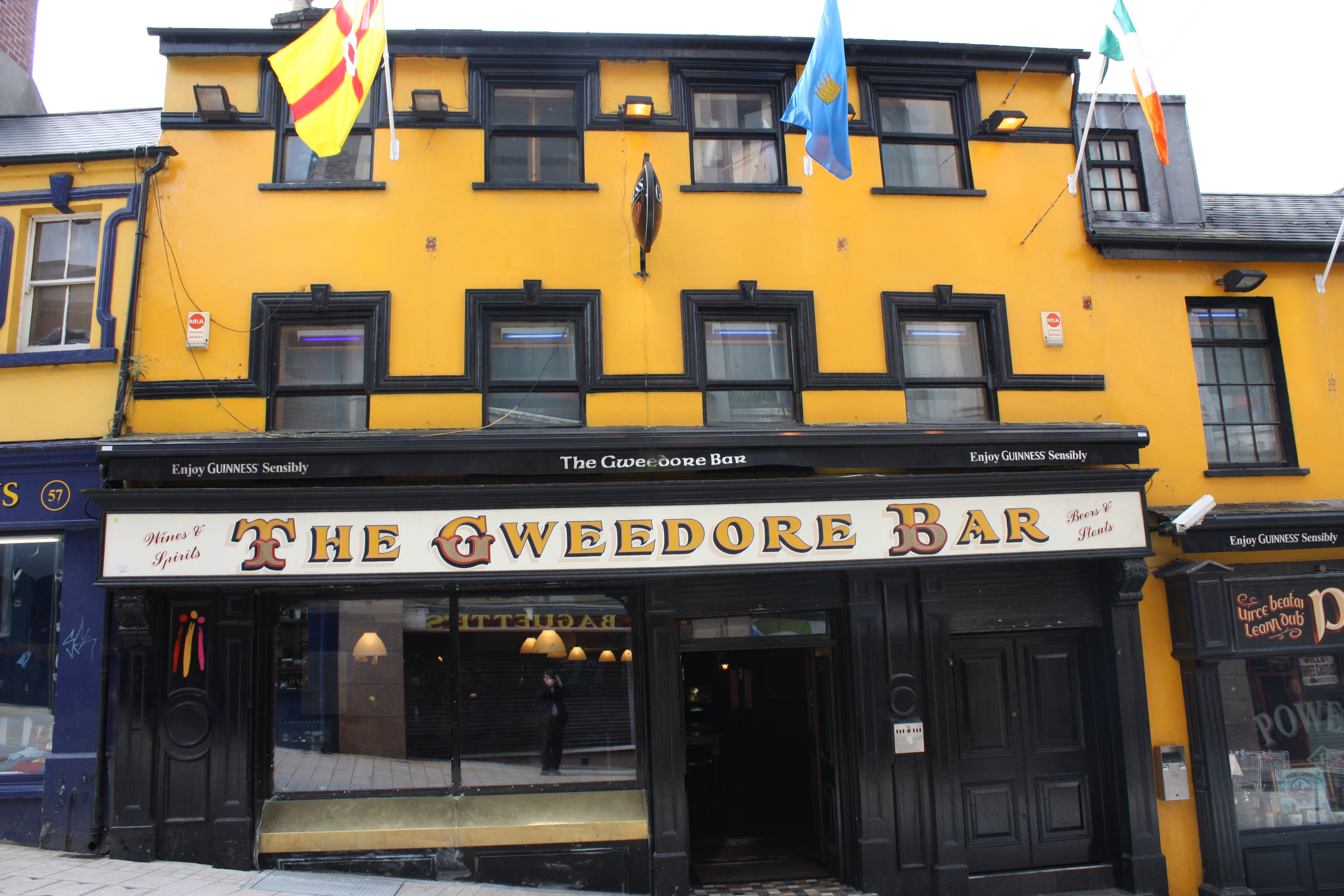
The Gweedore Bar (beside Peadar O'Donnell's), Derry

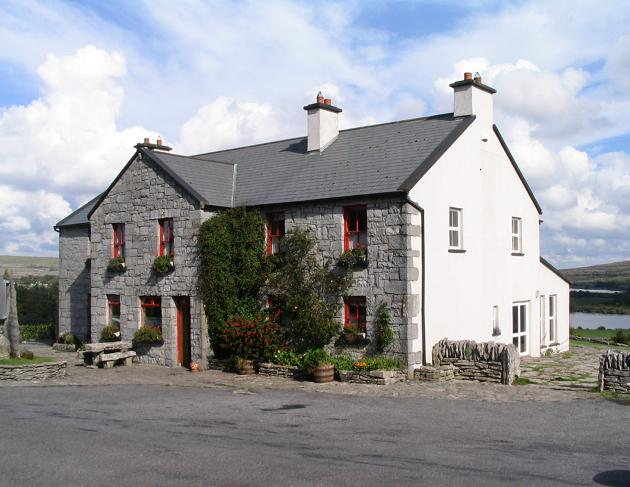
Cassidy's Pub, Carran, Co. Clare

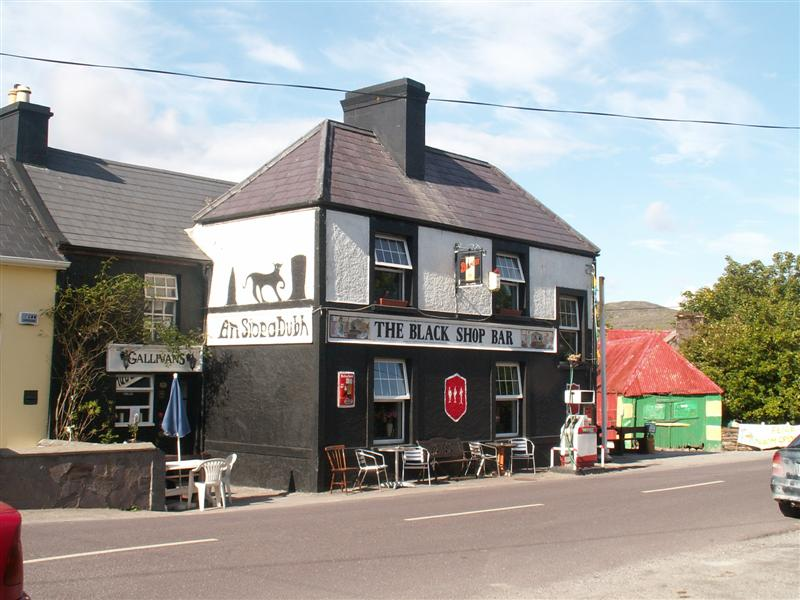
The Black Shop Bar, Castlecove, Kerry

Pubs in Northern Ireland are largely identical to their counterparts in the Republic except for the aforementioned lack of spirit grocers. Traditional pubs in Belfast include The Crown Liquor Saloon (owned by the National Trust) and the city's oldest bar, White's Tavern, which was established in 1630 as a wine shop. Outside Belfast, pubs such as the House of McDonnell in Ballycastle (a former spirit grocery retaining all the characteristics of the type) are representative of the traditional country pub. Peadar O'Donnell's is a famous traditional pub on Waterloo Street in Derry, while The Farmers Home is another fine traditional pub in Strabane, County Tyrone.

=== Culture and etiquette ===
For centuries, the Irish public house has been an integral part of Irish social culture. In Ireland the local pub is a pillar of the community in the same way as the local church. It functions as both a place to consume alcohol at leisure as well as a place in which to meet and greet the people of a locality. In many cases, Irish people will have one (or more) pubs which are referred to as 'the local' which is the pub which they frequent most often. There is generally a very close and mutual understanding and informality between the customer and the staff and, in many cases, particularly in country pubs, virtually all of the regular customers will know each other very well. That warm and friendly atmosphere extends to outsiders as well and it is not uncommon for strangers or tourists to be drawn into conversations with locals. In addition to the casual social atmosphere, hearty food and drink, sports, and traditional Irish music are hallmarks of pub culture. Food is usually simple and traditional featuring classic Irish dishes like Irish stew, boxty, and Irish soda bread. Drinks include a variety of spirits and beers on tap but one can certainly expect Guinness and Irish whiskey such as Bushmills or Jameson. Irish pubs with televisions frequently show Gaelic games such as Gaelic football or hurling. While not all Irish pubs will feature live Irish music, it is an important part of the culture. The atmosphere is cozy and the pub furniture is simple and built to last.

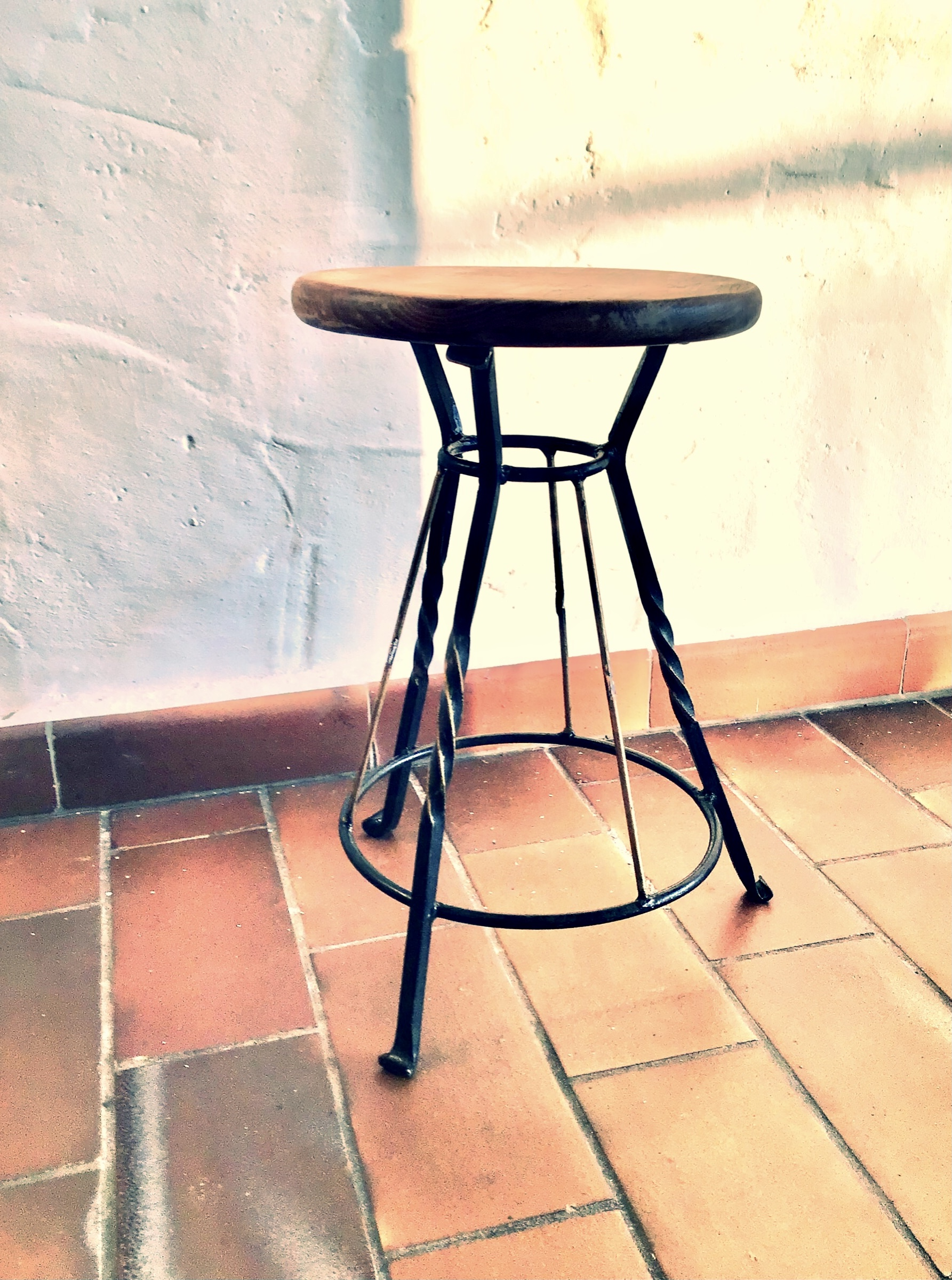
Pub stool from 1910, Cork, Ireland

The etiquette in Irish pubs varies from place to place. Generally speaking, however, it is never necessary to tip staff. The only exception to this rule might be in a pub which has waiters for serving food, or for staff at a hotel bar, or on special occasions or events when the bar staff show particular skill, hard-work or good-humour. But again, this is rare. In addition, unless there are waiters, patrons must order their drinks at the bar, pay the bartender and bring drinks to their seats. It is traditional that, when with a group, patrons take turns buying rounds of drinks for the group as a whole. It is considered bad manners for patrons to leave before buying their round of drinks. The traditional Irish toast is "Sláinte" (SLAWN-chuh) which is the Irish language equivalent of "cheers".

==== Traditional Irish music ====
Traditional Irish music may not be found in every Irish pub, but many feature live Irish music sessions on weekends. Musicians will often play jigs, reels and other folk songs with Uilleann pipes, fiddles, bodhráns (traditional drums), and flutes. There can be singers as well. Musicians are not always paid but usually receive free drinks for their music.

== Around the world ==
=== United States ===
Irish pubs are common in the United States and most cities have some representation of Irish pub culture. Many examples of these pubs date back to the early 20th century or mid to late 19th century and some of them came into being as a result of large-scale emigration from Ireland since the 1840s.

The most recent wave of Irish pubs started appearing during the 1990s with the arrival of venues modelled on the great Victorian pubs of Ireland. The new wave of Irish pubs can be attributed to the Guinness Irish Pub Concept and the Irish Pub Company founded by Mel McNally in 1990 and dedicated to exporting the Irish pub around the world. The pubs the Irish Pub Company established were designed to be as authentic as possible and usually featured millwork and fittings made in Ireland and transported to North America. As this style of pub became very popular and successful, many more began to open across the United States. However, as the cost of importing woodwork and fittings for an Irish pub became prohibitive, prospective owners looked more locally and nearly all of the required material is now more than adequately supplied from within the United States or Canada.

While many pubs are still owned by individuals of Irish origin, the vast majority of new Irish pubs being opened are owned by American restaurant operators who recognise the very attractive business model and the potential return on investment. In an industry where profit margins can be low, margins in Irish pubs are significantly higher than those achieved within the mainstream casual-dining sector, achieved by focusing on beverage sales over food. Irish pubs also have the ability to attract business during periods when their casual-dining counterparts are traditionally slow. Examples of the "Irish pub" concept translating to American casual dining include O'Charley's and Bennigan's.

Often, the Irish theme extends only to the name and the decor, while the menus are much like those in other American bars or full of faux-Irish dishes like "Irish nachos" and Reuben egg rolls. Irish pubs in the United States that try to be authentic usually ensure that food is 'made from scratch', from fresh ingredients and using local produce where possible.

=== Worldwide ===
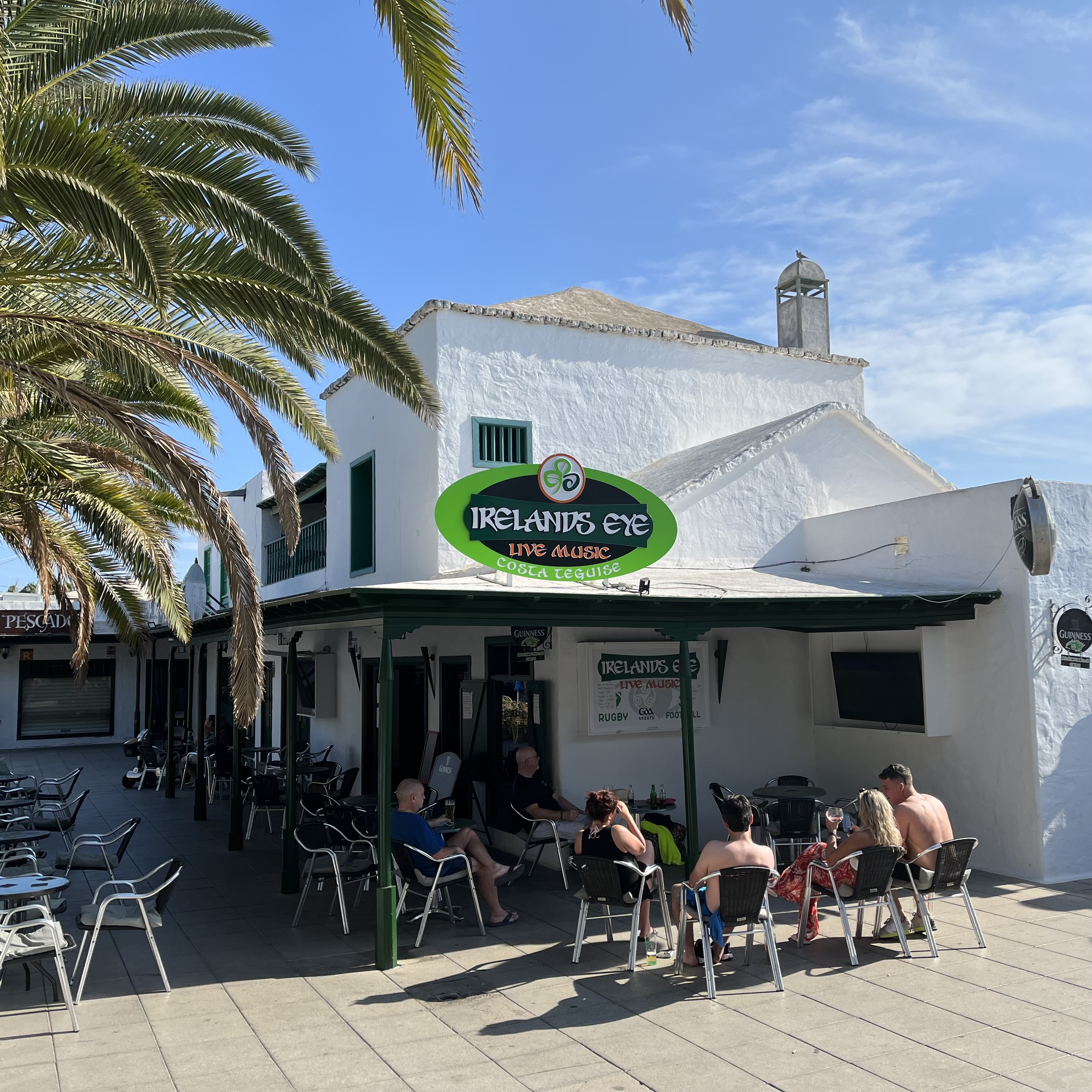
Irish pub in Lanzarote, Canary Islands

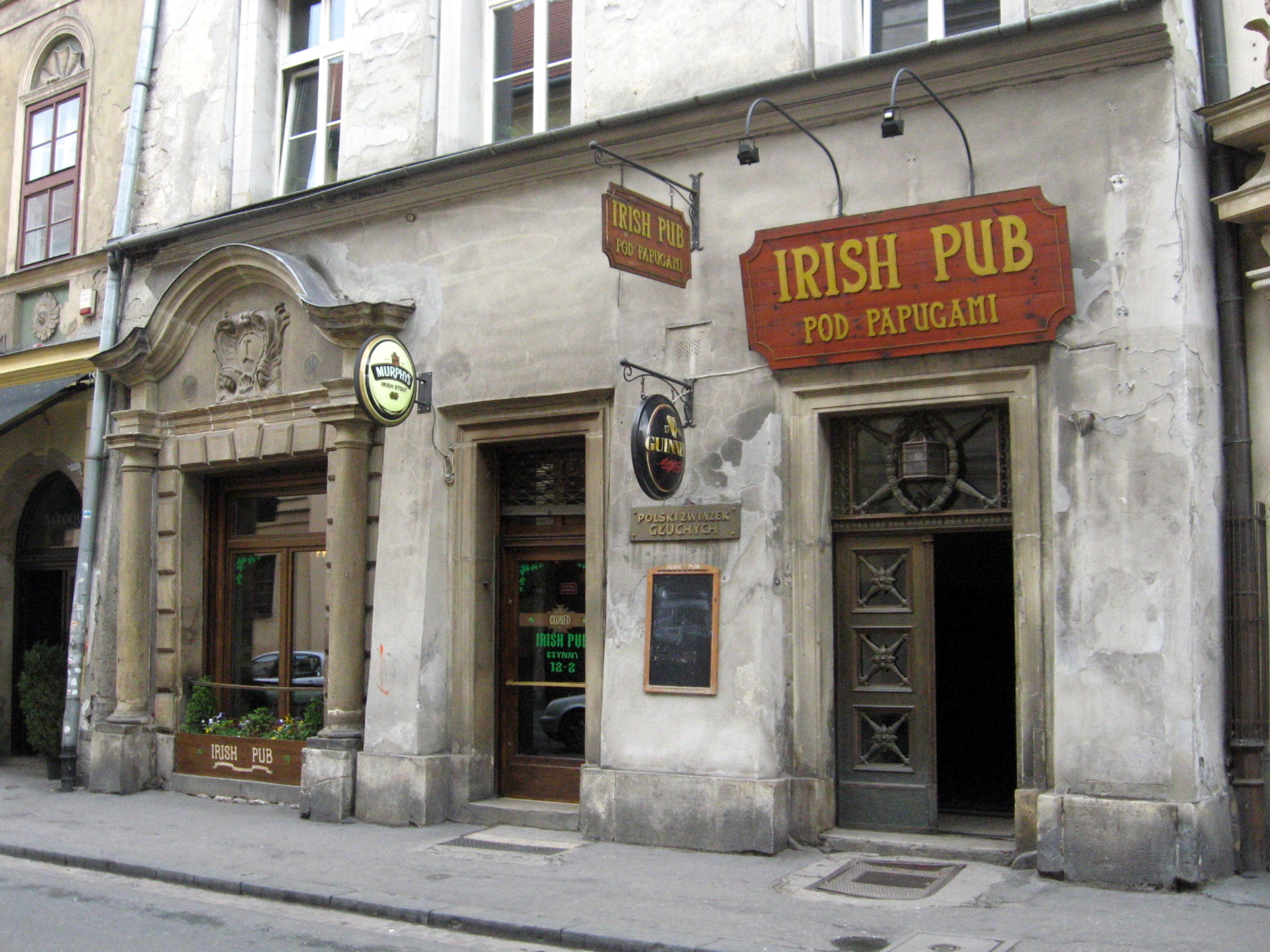
Irish pub in Kraków, Poland

There are an estimated 7,000 Irish themed pubs worldwide. They have been criticised for a lack of authenticity. They are particularly prevalent wherever expatriate communities are found, arguably due to a sense of connection to the Irish diaspora.

While pubs run by Irish emigrants have existed for centuries, the Irish theme pub is estimated to date from 1991, when the Irish Pub Company opened its first outlet in a scheme backed by the brewer Guinness. The Irish Pub Company opened 2,000 pubs across Europe between 1992 and 1999. They have establishments in over 53 countries around the world.

== Tourism ==
Pubs in tourist-oriented areas are also more likely to serve food to their customers, a recent phenomenon dating from the 1970s. Prior to this time, food was not served in the vast majority of Irish pubs, as eating out was uncommon in Ireland (except in "eating-houses" set up on market days) and most towns and villages had at least one commercial hotel where food was available throughout the day.

== See also ==
- List of public house topics
- Holy Hour#Slang meaning
