= Beer in Northern Ireland =

Beer in Northern Ireland has been influenced by immigration into Ulster, especially from Scotland, and the drinking habits in Ireland until the partition of Ireland. Whiskey drinking was always a tradition with Guinness from Dublin being a strong influence in the style of beer drunk in the 19th and 20th centuries. Brewing traditions almost ceased to exist as smaller breweries closed, or were taken over, and then the large breweries in turn closed down their facilities. The Campaign for Real Ale (CAMRA) was founded in 1971; however, it was 10 years before the first new brewery, Hilden Brewing, opened its doors.

Most microbreweries in Northern Ireland find it difficult to sell beer in draught form due to the local tied-pubs issues, where most pubs are owned by Diageo (Guinness), C&C Group (Tennent's) or Molson Coors Brewing Company.

== History ==
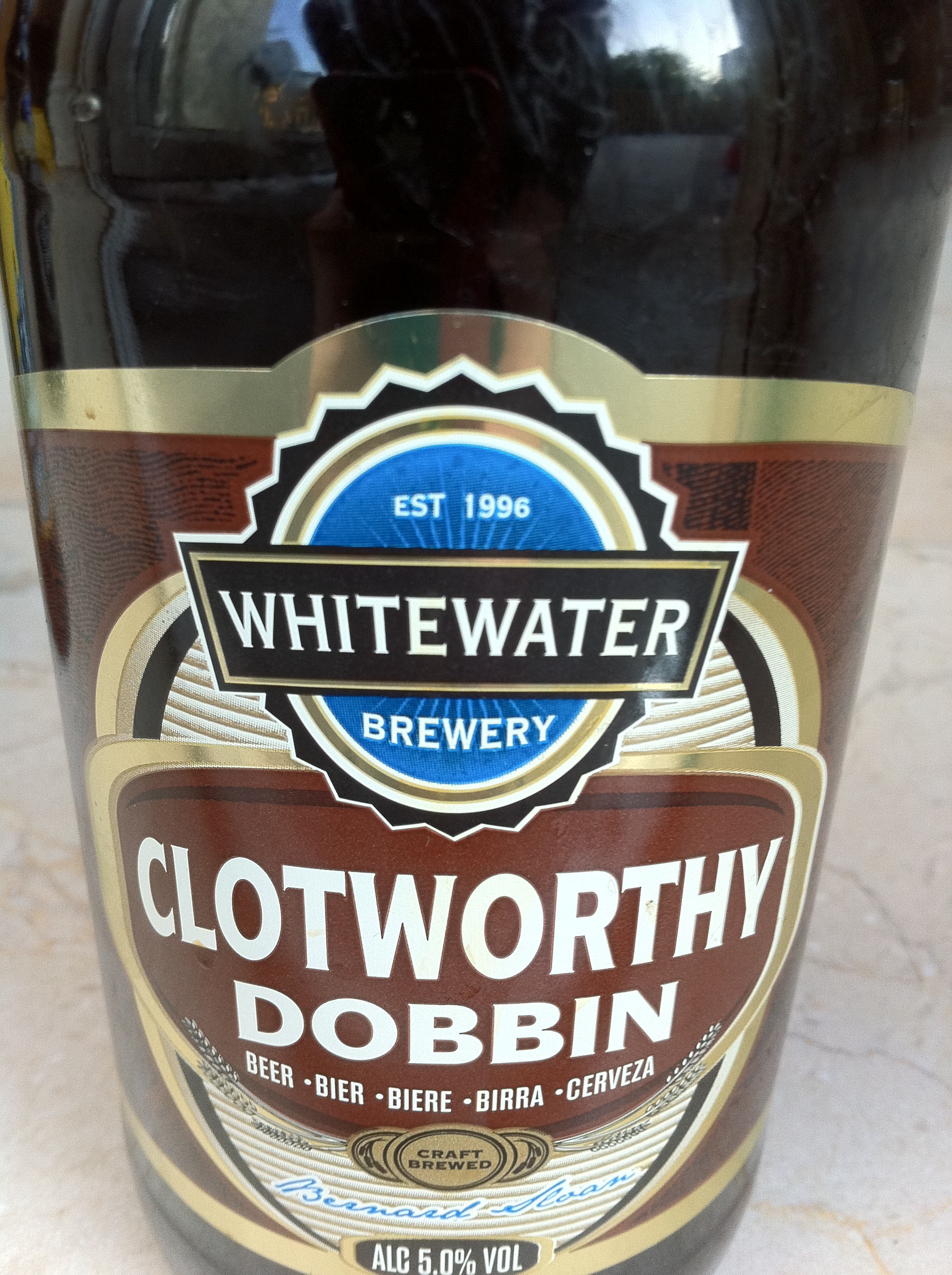
Whitewater - Clotworthy Dobbin

The Celtic tradition of brewing beer almost certainly existed in Ireland from before 1,000 BC using barley. The Roman Emperor Julian the Apostate, in a 1,600-year-old poem, described Celtic beer as smelling “like a billy goat.” Historically Ireland produced ale without the use of hops, as the plant is not native to Ireland, which led in the 18th century to importing quantities of hops from England.

During the 18th century, the Irish Parliament used taxation to encourage brewing at the expense of distilling, reasoning that beer was less harmful than whiskey. In the 1760s about 600,000 barrels of beer were brewed annually in Ireland. In the 1760s, the Royal Dublin Society offered prizes to brewers who used the most Irish hops and those that produced the most Porter.

During the interwar period in Northern Ireland, "many drinkers preferred whiskey to beer."

The Caffrey's Ulster Brewery, established in Belfast in 1897 and taken over by Bass in 1974, closed in 2004, so ending big company brewing in Northern Ireland. Stout is the most preferred beer in Northern Ireland, with lager second and bitter beer as a distant third preference. Guinness, brewed at St James's Gate Brewery in Dublin, is still a popular stout beer in Northern Ireland.

Until its closure in 2025, Hilden Brewing Company claimed to be Ireland's oldest microbrewery, founded in 1981.

In 2007, Clotworthy Dobbin, produced by Whitewater Brewing Company, was judged one of the best 50 beers in the world.

The number of microbreweries in Northern Ireland has significantly increased in recent years, from five in 2012 to a peak of thirty in 2018.

For many years Northern Ireland's craft breweries called for a change in the law, which prevented them selling their produce directly to the customer on site or online. This also incurred additional costs using a third party for sales. In 2023, an Amendment to the 2021 Licensing and Registration of Clubs Act (Northern Ireland) created a new category of license for local producers, allowing them to sell directly to the public. While this was celebrated as a positive step forward, craft brewers still view licensing laws as outdated and restrictive to growth. Breweries such as Bullhouse, Boundary, and Modest Beer, among others continue to campaign for changes that would allow for laws to be more aligned with the rest of the UK. An example of some of the restrictions was highlighted in 2026 when the supermarket Lidl opened a pub in order to benefit from alcohol sales when its Belfast store was denied an off-sales licence under the surrender principle.

== List of Northern Ireland breweries ==
Brewers in Northern Ireland
Brewery	Town	County	Since	Contract Brewed?
Bangor Bay	Bangor	County Down	2026	
Beer Hut	Kilkeel	County Down	2017	
Bell's	Belfast	County Antrim	2022	
Boundary	Belfast	County Antrim	2015	
Bullhouse	Belfast	County Antrim	2016	
Corn Mill	Drumsurn	County Londonderry	2025	
Derry City Brewing Co.	Derry	County Londonderry	2026	
Dopey Dick	Derry	County Londonderry	2016	Rough Brothers
Farmageddon			2013	Brand owned by and brewed at Fermanagh Beer Co. since 2023
Fermanagh Beer Company (Inishmacsaint)	Derrygonnelly	County Fermanagh	2010	
Heaney Farmhouse	Bellaghy	County Londonderry	2016	
Hercules (Yardsman)	Belfast	County Antrim	2014	Contract brewed by Whitewater since 2023
Knockout	Belfast	County Antrim	2015	
Lacada	Portrush	County Antrim	2015	
MashDown	Banbridge	County Down	2018	Whitewater
McKeever's	Derry	County Londonderry	2026	Contract brewed by Otterbank.
Modest Beer	Bangor	County Down	2023	
Moon Brew	Belfast	County Antrim	2026	
Mourne Mountains	Warrenpoint	County Down	2015	
Northbound	Derry	County Londonderry	2015	
Ormeau	Belfast	County Antrim	2022	
Our Brewery	Randalstown	County Antrim	2022	
Out of Office	Belfast	County Antrim	2022	
Rough Brothers	Derry	County Londonderry	2019	
Tilt & Pour	Belfast	County Antrim	2023	Cuckoo brewery based at Heaney
Treble Brewing & Blending	Dundonald	County Down	2026	
Walled City Brewery	Derry	County Londonderry	2015	
Whisht (formerly Sheelin)	Bellanaleck	County Fermanagh	2023	
Whitewater Brewery	Castlewellan	County Down	1996	

== See also ==
- Beer and breweries by region
- Beer in the United Kingdom
- Beer in England
- Beer in Scotland
- Beer in Wales
- Beer in Ireland
- List of breweries in Ireland
