= Beer in Ireland =

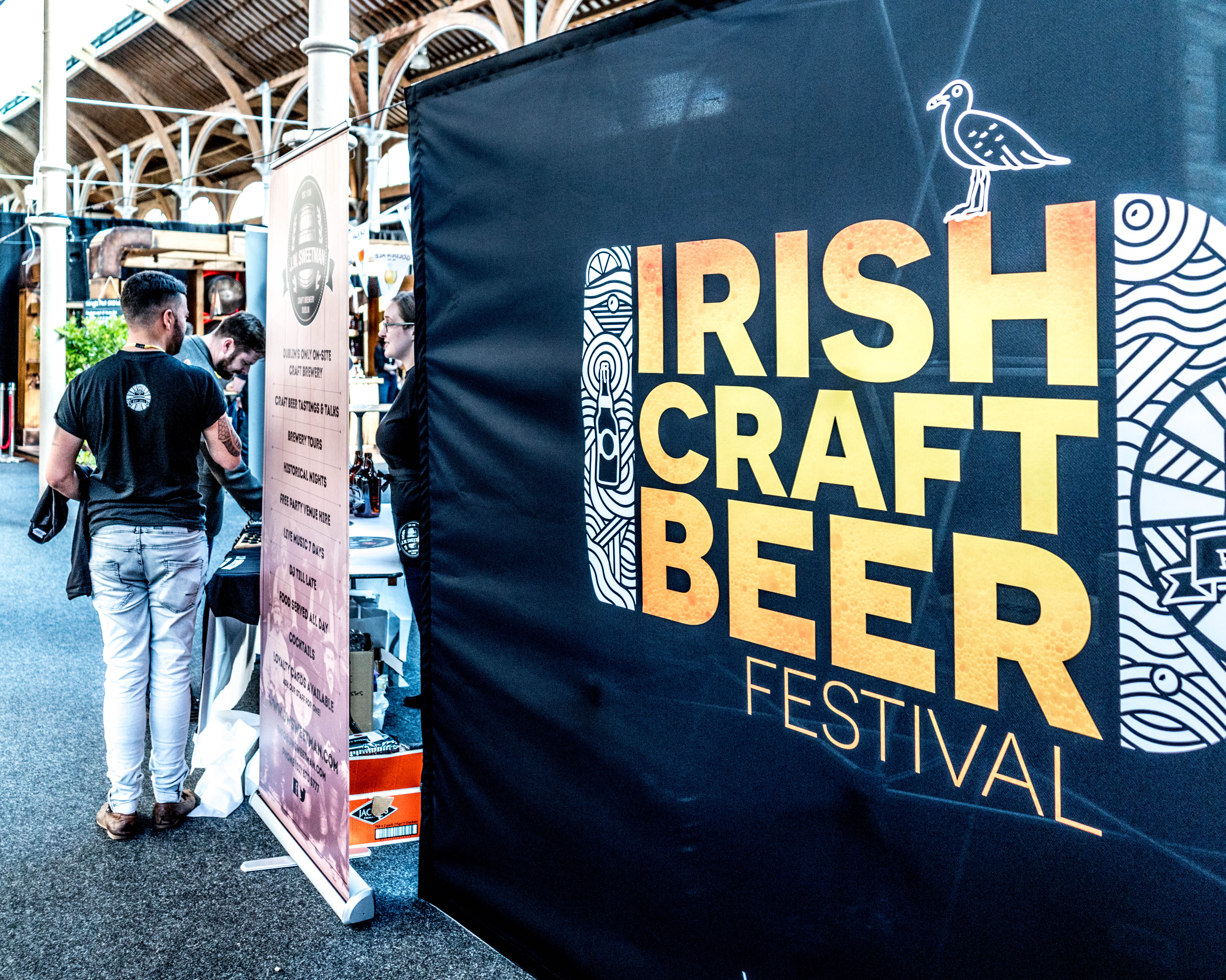
Irish Craft Beer Festival, 2015

Brewing in Ireland has a long history. Production within the Republic of Ireland in 2012 stood at over 8 million hectolitres, and approximately half the alcohol consumed is beer.

Lager accounts for 63.5% of the beer sold. The market share for stout is 29.3% and ale is 6.2%.

== History ==
By the beginning of the nineteenth century, there were over two hundred breweries in all of Ireland, fifty-five of them in Dublin. In the nineteenth century, the number of breweries fell to about fifty, and by 2007 only about twelve remained.

Historically, Ireland produced ale, without the use of hops. As the plant is not native to Ireland, large quantities were imported from England in the 18th century. In 1752, more than 500 tons of English hops were imported through Dublin alone. In the second half of the 18th century, beer, mostly porter, was imported from England in increasing quantities: 15,000 barrels in 1750, 65,000 in 1785, and over 100,000 in 1792. In the 1760s about 600,000 barrels of beer were brewed annually in Ireland.

In the 18th century, the Irish Parliament used taxation to encourage brewing at the expense of distilling, reasoning that beer was less harmful than whiskey. In the 1760s, the Dublin Society (which later became, in 1820, the Royal Dublin Society (RDS)) offered prizes to brewers who used the most Irish hops and those that produced the most porter.

Brewing prospered in the early decades of the 19th century and by 1814 Ireland was exporting more beer to England than it imported. Irish exports to England accelerated as the century progressed and from a modest 11,328 barrels in 1828, exported 689,796 barrels by 1901.

== Beer market ==
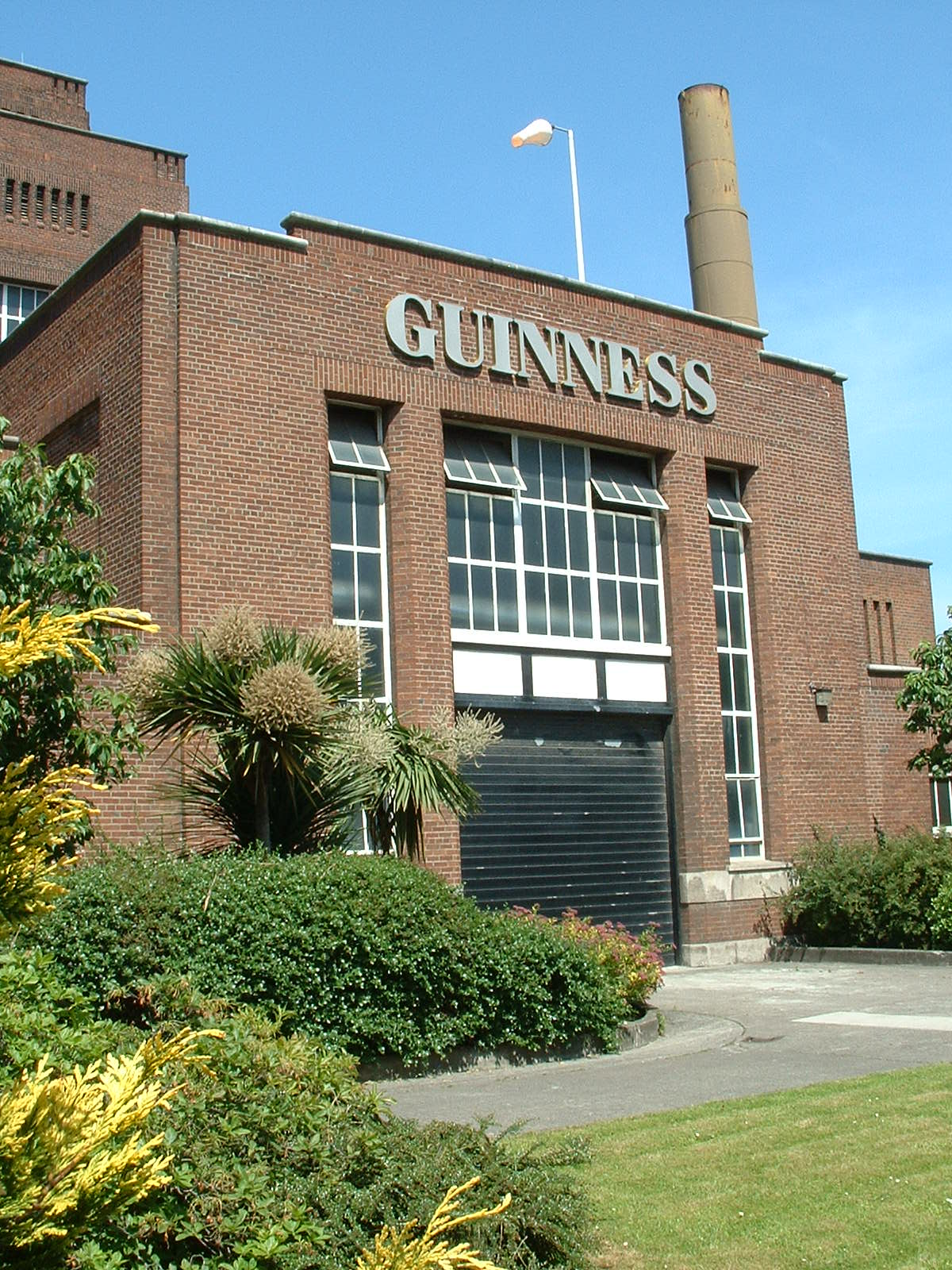
St James's Gate Brewery.

In 1998, the Republic of Ireland produced approximately 8.5m hectolitres of beer per year; this rose to 8.7m in 2002. Exports were 3.5m hectolitres in 1998 and fell to 2.4m in 2002. Whilst Ireland lies 6th in the world for beer consumption per capita, it ranks 4th in the consumption of alcohol, with 11.7 litres per head in 2011.

Per capita beer consumption 2012
Rank	Country	Litres
1	Czech Republic	148
2	Austria	107
3	Germany	106
4	Estonia	102
5	Ireland	98
5	Poland	98
14	USA	77
18	Belgium	74
22	UK	68

== Stout ==
In 1756, Arthur Guinness set up a small brewery, originally in County Kildare before moving to Dublin in 1759. Having initially brewed ale, he switched to producing porter, which was a style from London. In the early twentieth century, Guinness became the largest brewer in the world, exporting the Irish style to many countries. Although no longer the largest brewer of beer in the world, it remains the largest brewer of stout. In 2014, Guinness sales amounted to 19% of all beer sales in the Republic of Ireland.

Stout brewed by Guinness (and the smaller brewers Murphy's and Beamish) once dominated domestic beer consumption in Ireland, with lager and ale having much smaller shares. Lager has subsequently grown in popularity with Carlsberg taking 8% of the market and Budweiser 7% in 2014.

Draught Irish stout is normally served nitrogenated, to create a creamy texture with a long-lasting head.

Craft stouts available in Ireland include O'Hara's Irish stout, brewed by Carlow Brewing Company, Black Rock Irish Stout from the Dungarvan Brewing Company, and Galway Hooker (Brewery), and Galway Hooker's Irish Stout.

=== Gallery of Irish stouts ===
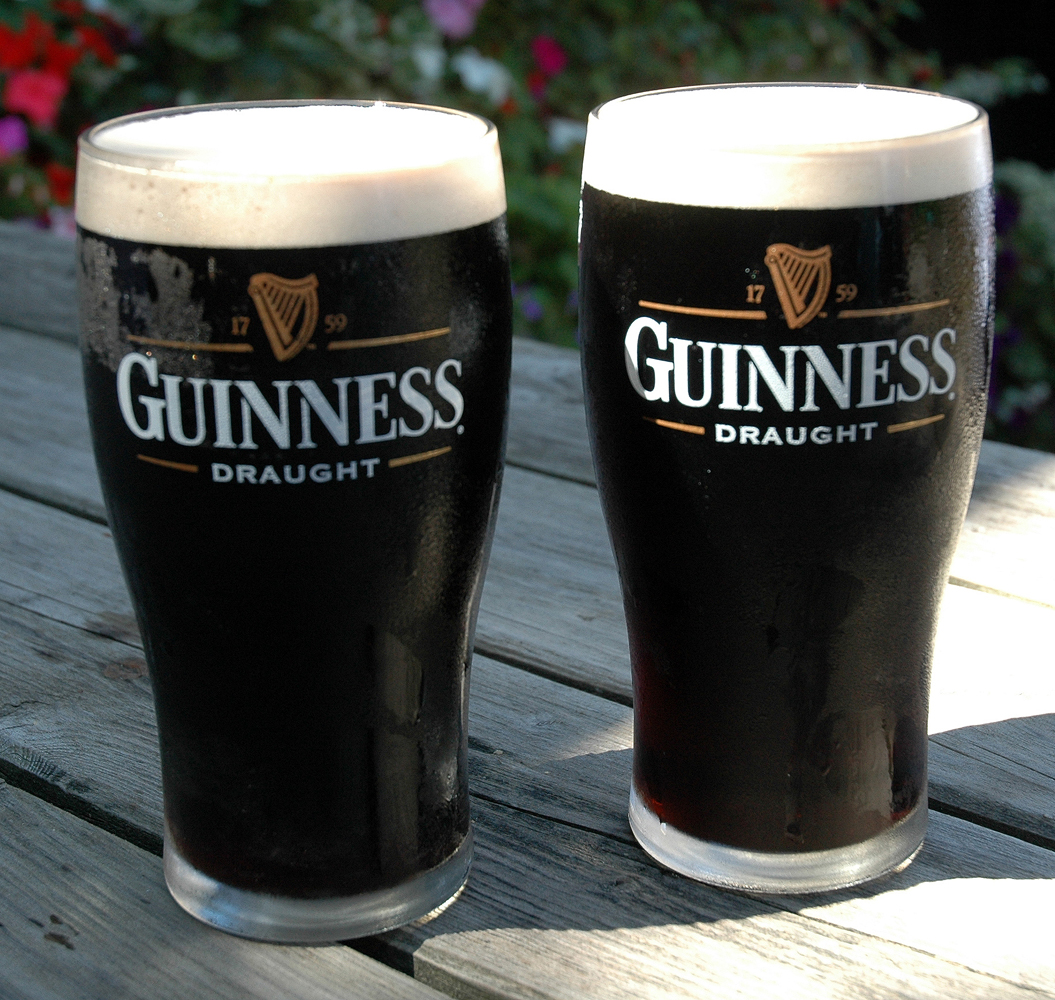
Draught Guinness

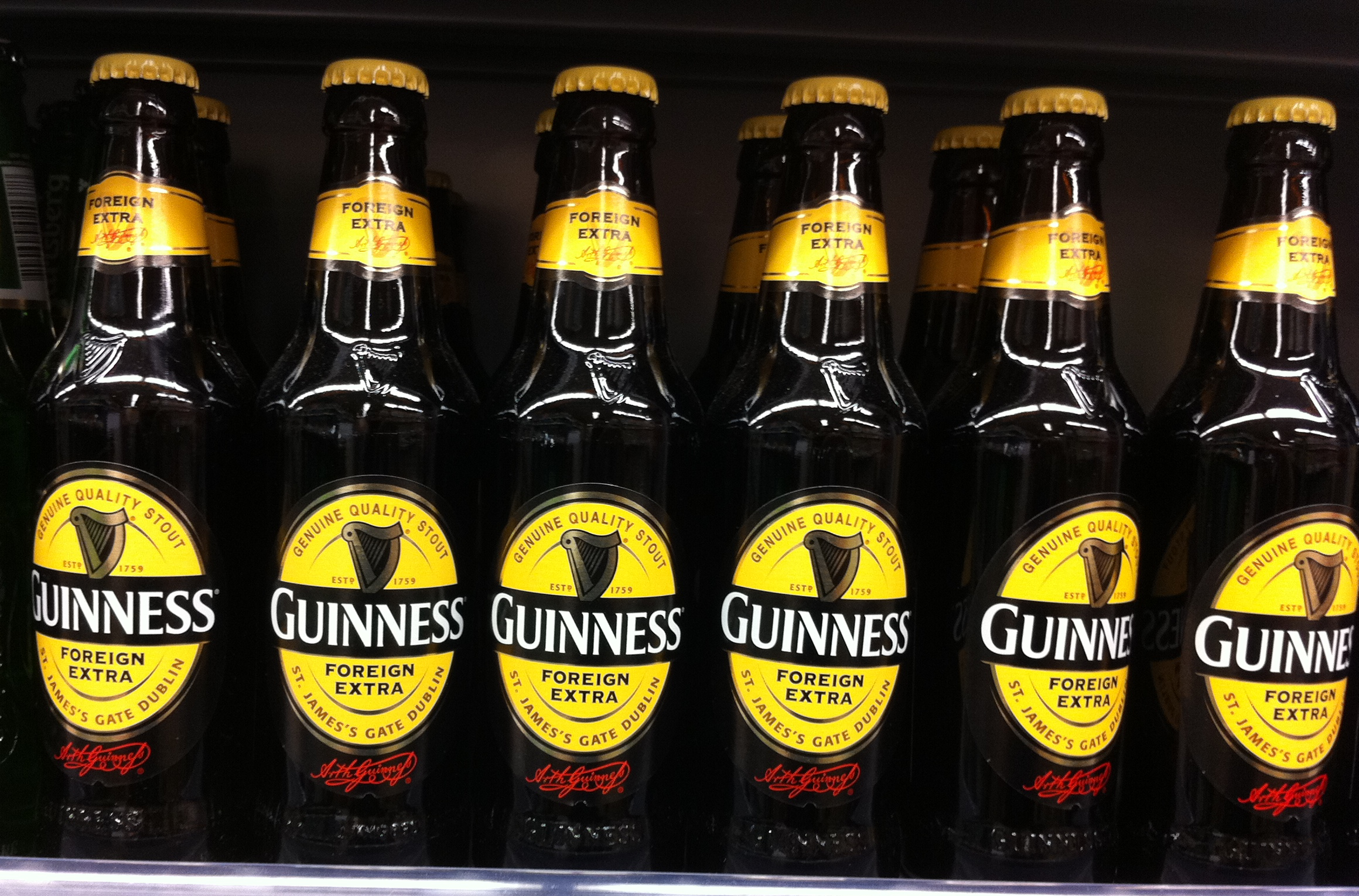
Guinness Foreign Extra

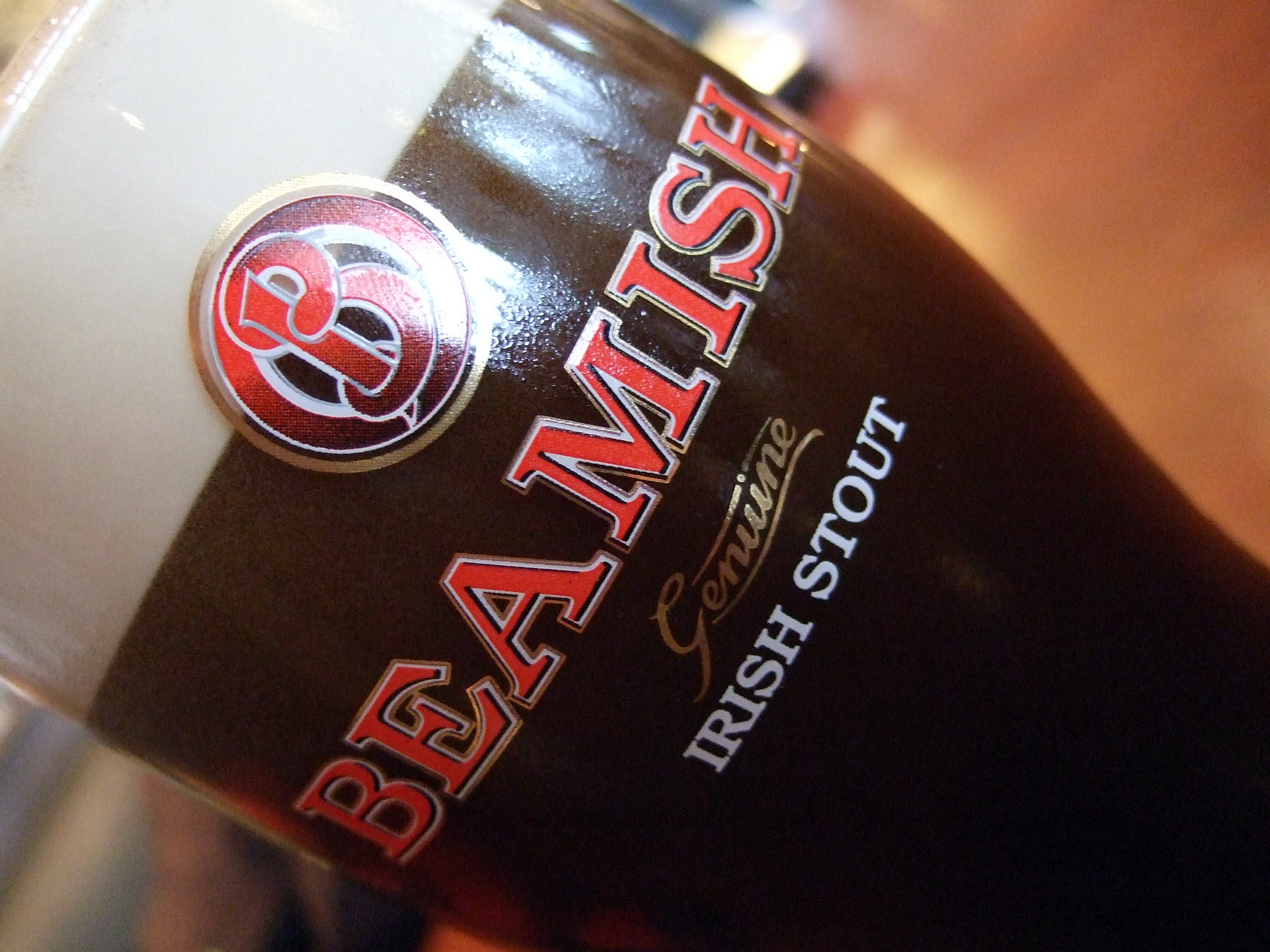
Beamish Genuine Irish Stout

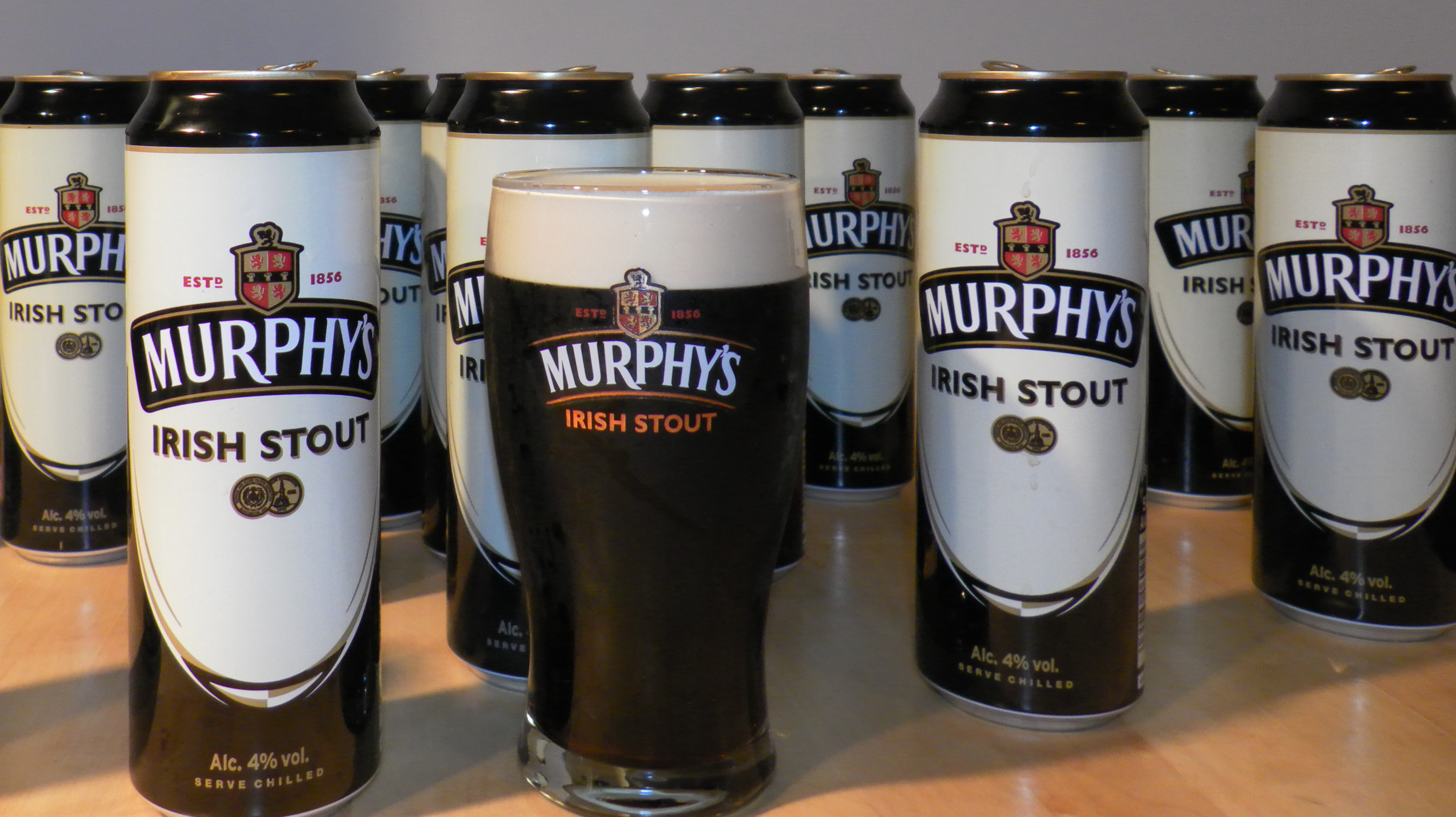
Murphy's Irish Stout

== Irish red ale ==
The ales produced in Ireland are now largely in the Irish red ale style, with a slight red colour, generally in the 3.8–4.4% ABV range (although export versions are often stronger). The largest national brand is Smithwick's, produced by the Diageo multinational. Others include Diageo's Macardle's, Franciscan Well's Rebel Red, Carlow Brewing Company's O'Hara's Irish Red and Messrs Maguire Rusty. Dungarvan Brewing Company's Copper Coast red ale was released in 2010, along with Clanconnel Brewery's McGrath's Irish Red. Hallion Irish Red is produced in County Down by the Whitewater Brewing Company. Eight Degrees brewery launched their Sunburnt Irish Red Ale in 2011.

== Lager brewing ==
The first lager brewery in Ireland was set up in Dartry, Dublin, in 1891, but did not survive very long. Lager was later brewed for a short period at the Regal Brewery, Kells. Harp Lager has been brewed since 1968, originally in Dundalk.

Heineken Ireland, based at the Murphy Brewery in Cork, have the largest share of the lager market. In addition to Heineken, they brew Amstel and Coors Light, as well as the brands they acquired from Beamish & Crawford including Fosters and Carling.

Tennent's, although brewed in Glasgow in Scotland, is a very popular pale lager in Ulster, especially in Northern Ireland and County Donegal (mainly East Donegal and Inishowen).

== Irish craft beer and real ale ==
Beginning in the 1990s, brewpubs and microbreweries began to emerge. While some, such as the Biddy Early Brewery, Dublin Brewing Company and Dwan's, have since ceased production; others such as Porterhouse have celebrated twenty years in business, while the Hilden Brewery in Lisburn is Ireland's oldest independent brewer, having been established in 1981. The Carlow Brewing Company, established in 1996 and makers of the O'Hara's range, is another survivor of the "first wave" of Irish craft brewing, as is the Whitewater Brewing Company in Castlewellan, County Down, also established in 1996.

The "second wave" began in the mid-2000s and has included the Beoir Chorca Dhuibhne brewery in County Kerry, Galway Hooker brewery in County Galway, Dungarvan Brewing Company, Inishmacsaint Brewing Company (Fermanagh Beer Company) in County Fermanagh, Clanconnel Brewery, Trouble Brewing, Metalman Brewing, The Dingle Brewing Company in County Kerry, Bo Bristle (formerly Breweyed), and the Galway Bay Brewery, which, like the Porterhouse Brewing Company, also runs its own chain of pubs.

The "third wave" of Irish craft brewing began in 2013. The surge of new breweries is largely a result of changes in excise requirements, access to EU funding, and an increase in government-funded brewing education courses. Many second- and third-wave brewers are also involved in a professional brewers' association, Beer Ireland, which has provided members with networking opportunities and information on setting up a brewery.

=== Growth and market share ===
As of mid-2018, in addition to international/macro-breweries such as Guinness and Heineken, there were around 110 independent Irish craft breweries in operation, in Northern Ireland and the Republic of Ireland combined, and craft beer represented 2.8% of 2017 sales in the Republic of Ireland. This was an increase, in the Republic of Ireland, from approximately fifty breweries and a market share of 1.5% of beer sales by volume in Ireland in 2014.

Despite the low market share, macro breweries have begun to produce product lines targeting this sector of the market. Heineken Ireland began marketing a pale ale, "Cute Hoor", distributed in the craft beer sections of supermarkets and off licences and without plainly identifying the brewer. Heineken also briefly deceptively marketed "Blasket Blonde", in Kerry, from March 2015 to September 2016, and "Beanntrai Bru" in Cork in August 2016, as locally made craft beers, from invented breweries.

C&C Group produce 'Roundstone' Ale and 'Pana Cork' Lager at their facility in Clonmel, County Tipperary, as well as beers under the 'Five Lamps' brand - the Five Lamps being an area associated with inner-city Dublin. Both Heineken Ireland and C&C were investigated for these naming practices in 2016.

=== Consolidation and acquisitions ===
Carrig Brewing Company and Brú Brewery, both of which operated pubs in addition to brewing, merged operations in 2019 with brewing moved to Brú's facility in Trim, County Meath. Brú merged with Galway Bay Brewery, another brewery with a pub chain, in 2021.

As in other countries, international brewers and drinks companies have acquired independent craft breweries in Ireland, too, in order to either protect their market share or to expand their own portfolios. Cork's Franciscan Well Brewery was acquired by Molson Coors in 2013. It continues to brew the main Franciscan Well beers, but now also markets a mainstream lager, "Archway" with the parent firm name abbreviated to "MCBC" on packaging. The Eight Degrees Brewery was acquired by Irish Distillers, the producer of Jameson Irish Whiskey in 2018, in order to secure a supply of barrels used to brew stout and IPA for its "Caskmates" range.

Investment without full takeover has occurred at some breweries. 32% of the Carlow Brewing Company has been acquired by Hijos de Rivera Brewery, the makers of Estrella Galicia; while Warsteiner have invested in Rye River Brewing

=== Tap access ===
While Ireland has little history of the tied house system - outside of Cork where both major breweries had, but eventually disposed of, substantial estates - craft breweries have experienced problems in gaining taps in pubs. A number of craft breweries now operate pubs, on-site restaurants or entire pub chains to provide outlets with guaranteed availability. These include Brú Brewery, Carrig Brewing, Dead Centre Brewing, Galway Bay Brewery, The Porterhouse, Rascals Brewing and Rising Sons Brewery

== Professional, Trade and Consumer Associations ==
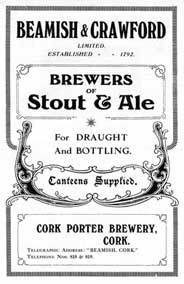
Old advertisement for Beamish stout

There are three brewing associations operating in Ireland.

- The Irish Brewers Association was founded in 1904 and is now a division of IBEC. While it claims to be "the representative voice for the brewing industry in Ireland" it has only five members, which include Diageo, Heineken, and Molson Coors, all macro breweries.
- Beer Ireland was founded in 2012 by a group of third wave brewers hoping to set up their own microbreweries. By the end of 2013, the group had 100 members, including brewers at approximately 20 Irish craft breweries. The group has embraced the spirit of comradery and collaboration typical of the craft brewing industry. The organisation's goal is to improve the quality and proliferation of Irish craft beer.
- The Independent Craft Brewers & Distillers of Ireland was founded in 2013 by Carlow brewing director Seamus O'Hara. The group was initially established to support craft brewers and distillers in Ireland, but has since re-focused its efforts solely on brewing to become the Independent Craft Brewers of Ireland. Membership of the group is open to anyone operating a microbrewery in Ireland, within the definition of same by the Irish Revenue Commissioners.

Beoir (Irish for "beer"), founded in July 2010, is an independent group of consumers which seeks greater choice, quality, and value-for-money for beer and cider drinkers on the island of Ireland. Their primary goal is to support and raise awareness of Ireland's native independent microbreweries and craft cider-makers.

== Pseudo-Irish beer ==
A number of beers claim an Irish provenance or are commissioned by Irish companies, but are produced outside Ireland. In the past these have included Árainn Mhór beers, and Time Lager. Today, the Strangford Lough Brewing Company produces a concentrated wort which they export to Great Britain and the US where contract breweries turn it into finished beer.

Many breweries outside Ireland produce Irish-themed beers which are not commonly available in Ireland, such as Killian's Irish Red and Wexford Cream Ale.

== Spirit grocery ==
In 19th and early to mid-20th century Ireland, a spirit grocery combined a public house and an ancillary retail business, usually a grocery or hardware shop. Several spirit groceries can still be found in rural towns and villages.

== See also ==
- Beer and breweries by region
- Beer in Northern Ireland
