= Carlow Brewing Company =

Irish craft brewery

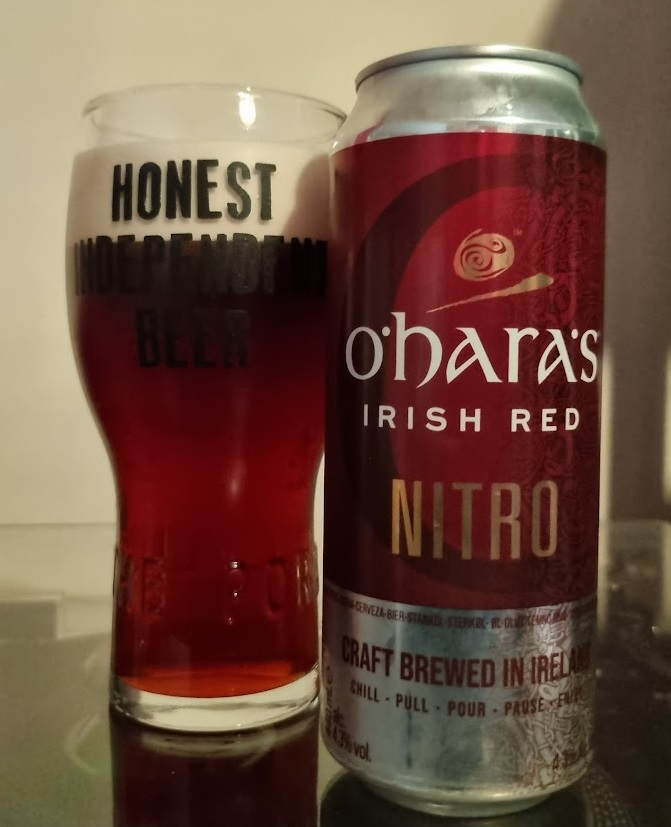
- O'Hara's Irish Red Ale in a pint glass, poured from a can.
- Trade name: O'Hara's Brewery
- Company type: Private
- Industry: Drinks industry
- Founded: 1996
- Founder: Seamus O'Hara; Éamonn O'Hara
- Headquarters: Bagnelstown, Carlow, Ireland
- Area served: Western Europe
- Key people: Séamus O'Hara (CEO)
- Products: Alcoholic beverages
- Brands: O'Hara's; Craigies Cider; Falling Apple
- Number of employees: 50 (2020)
- Website: carlowbrewing.com

The Carlow Brewing Company, better known as O'Hara's Brewery, is an Irish craft brewery located in Bagenalstown, County Carlow. It is the largest craft brewery in Ireland by production capacity.

== History ==
The Carlow Brewing Company was founded in 1996 by brothers Eamonn and Seamus O’Hara. Due to the dominance of macro beers in Ireland at the time, the brewery was initially very export-oriented. In the last few years, Irish interest in the brewery, and craft beer in general, has increased.

In 2017, the company acquired Craigies Cider. In April of the same year it was announced that, Hijos de Rivera, a Spanish brewery, had purchased a 32% stake in the Carlow Brewing Company.

In 2020, the company purchased a number of brands from Boyne Brewhouse, a brewery in Drogheda.

== Products ==
The company produces a wide range of beverages at its brewery in Bagnelstown, mainly under the O’Hara’s brand. Its core product line consists of both traditional Irish and international beer styles, including stouts, red ales, pale ales, India pale ales, lagers, and wheat beers.

Notable examples include:

- O’Hara’s Irish Stout, dry stout: 4.3% alcohol by volume (ABV).
- O'Hara's Irish Red, red ale: 4.3% ABV.
- O'Hara's Curim Gold, wheat beer: 4.3% ABV.
- O’Hara’s Irish Pale Ale, pale ale: 5.2% ABV.
- O'Hara's Leann Folláin, Irish stout: 6% ABV.

In addition to the O’Hara's brand, the company produces Craigies Cider and Falling Apple craft ciders, Glassbox Spirits, as well as several store-brand products for both Marks & Spencer and Aldi.

== See also ==
- Beer in Ireland
- Cider in Ireland
- List of breweries in Ireland
