= House of McDonnell =

Listed pub in Ballycastle, Northern Ireland

- The pub in 2012
- Former names: The Store
- Alternative names: Wee Tom's

General information
- Type: Public house; originally a spirit grocery
- Location: 71 Castle Street, Ballycastle, County Antrim, Northern Ireland
- Coordinates: 55.200°N 6.253°W
- Year built: 1744; 282 years ago
- Renovated: c. 1885 (added)

Design and construction
- Designations

Listed Building – Grade B1
- Official name: The House of McDonnell
- Designated: 11 March 1981
- Reference no.: HB05/15/020

Website
- thehouseofmcdonnell.co.uk

The House of McDonnell is a Grade B1 listed public house on Castle Street in Ballycastle, County Antrim, Northern Ireland. Established in 1744 and in continuous family ownership since 1766, it is a former spirit grocery that retains a largely intact late Victorian interior and historic plan form. The pub is recognised by the Campaign for Real Ale (CAMRA) as having an interior of "outstanding national historic importance" and is included in its National Inventory of Historic Pub Interiors with a three-star rating. In addition to operating as a pub, it hosts weekly live folk music performances.

== History ==
The public house was built in 1744 and has remained in the same family's ownership since 1766. Deeds associated with the property date from 1759, and historical records indicate that the site has contained licensed premises since at least the 18th century. It is an example of a former spirit grocery, a type of establishment that combined the sale of groceries with the serving of alcoholic drinks. By the mid-19th century the property comprised a pub, shop and residential accommodation, with substantial additions having been made to the rear. This dual function continued until legislative changes in 1922 prohibited mixed trading in licensed premises. The interior was extensively remodelled around 1885, when the building was also enlarged and given much of its present form, including its third storey and extensive rear extensions, with later alterations including the installation of the present bar counter and a timber-and-glass partition, thought to date from 1921.

The property remained in the ownership of the McDonnell family throughout the 19th and 20th centuries. From the 1890s until the early 1930s, Randal McDonnell also operated a veterinary practice from the building alongside the licensed premises. The premises were historically known as The Store, reflecting their combined retail and licensed functions. The name House of McDonnell was adopted in 1969 when ownership passed to Tom O'Neil, who inherited the pub from his aunt, Mary McDonnell. The pub is also known locally as Wee Tom's.

On 11 March 1981, the House of McDonnell was designated a Grade B1 listed building. It is regarded by the Campaign for Real Ale (CAMRA) as having an interior of "outstanding national historic importance" and is rated three stars on its National Inventory of Historic Pub Interiors. In addition to its role as a pub, the venue hosts weekly live folk music performances.

== Architecture ==
=== Exterior ===
The building has three storeys and an asymmetrical composition. To the right is a late-19th-century pub frontage incorporating a doorway and a large window with three tall arched lights, framed by timber pilasters supporting a projecting cornice and signboard. Two further entrances occupy the left side of the façade.

The upper floors are arranged with regularly spaced sash windows set within moulded surrounds. The front elevation is finished in lined render with quoin detailing, while the side gables are rendered and largely unadorned. At the rear, a series of multi-storey gabled extensions project from the main block, including a long three-storey wing and lower lean-to sections. These elevations contain a mixture of sash windows and secondary entrances and are finished mainly in roughcast, with areas of exposed brickwork visible. The building has slate-covered pitched roofs with rendered chimney stacks, while a later single-storey toilet block occupies part of the rear yard.

=== Interior ===
The interior retains the historic arrangement created during the late 19th and early 20th-century alterations, with the former grocery area separated from the drinking area by a timber and frosted-glass screen. An entrance porch retains a decorative Victorian tiled floor.

The front section contains a black-and-white quarry-tiled floor, panelled walls and a timber bar counter. Historic fittings include large advertising mirrors, bentwood chairs, traditional stools and a small snug lit by a coloured-glass window. A brass foot rail, reportedly salvaged from HMS Drake, runs along the base of the counter.

Beyond the partition is a second room of similar size with a brown-and-cream quarry-tiled floor and a matching panelled counter. The bar-back incorporates former spirit-dispensing casks and several historic whisky advertising mirrors. Additional original advertising mirrors survive within the servery.

A smaller room at the rear contains a quarry-tiled floor, a fireplace dating from the late 1930s and wall-mounted historic advertising displays. Access to the toilets is via a covered walkway, with the men's facilities retaining terrazzo flooring and tiled wall finishes. An upstairs lounge survives and remains in occasional use during busy periods and local events.
