= Hijos de Rivera Brewery =

Spanish brewery

Corporation Hijos de Rivera LLC
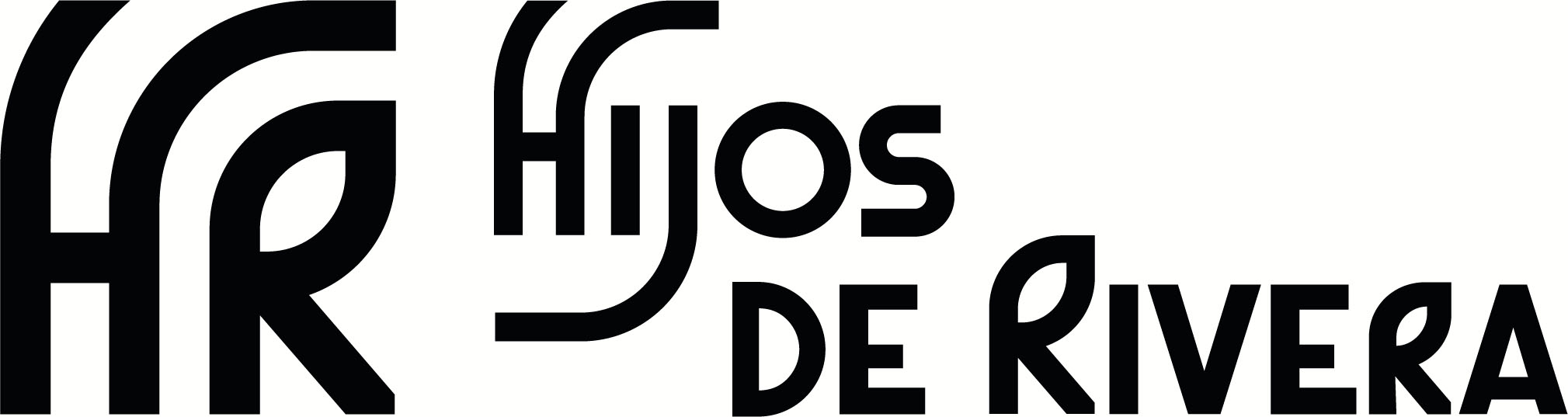

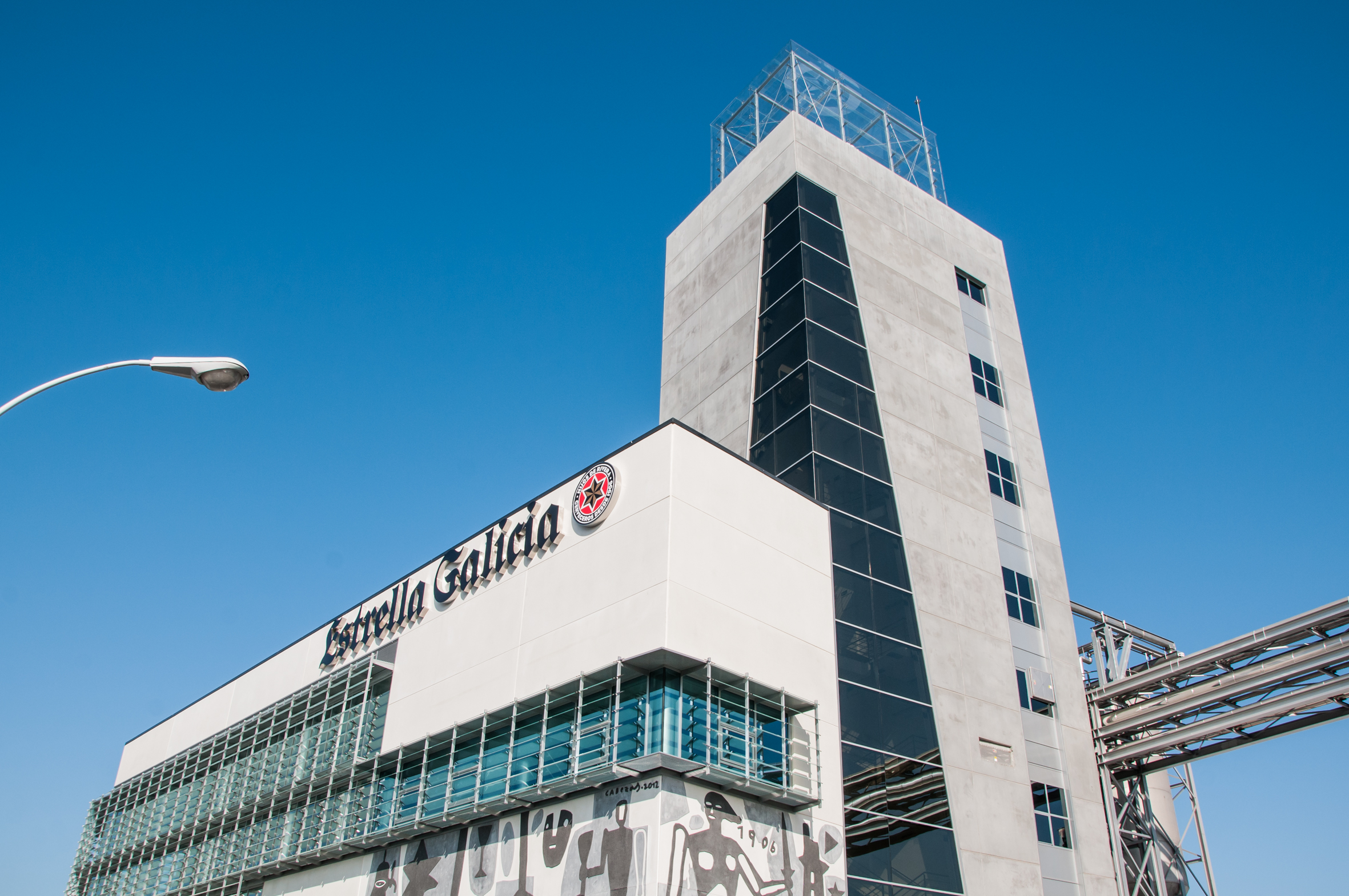
- Factory of Estrella Galicia in A Grela, A Coruña.
- Type: Limited Liability Company
- Industry: Beverages Foods
- Founded: A Coruña, Galicia (1906)
- Founder: José María Rivera Corral
- Headquarters: A Coruña, Spain
- Key people: Ignacio Rivera Quintana President
- Products: Estrella Galicia, 1906 beers, Fábrica de Cervezas, Cabreiroa Water, Cuevas Fontarel, AUARA, Maeloc ciders, Ponte da Boga wines, Rivera vermouth, La Tita Rivera, Zuvit, Quenza, Hijos de Rivera liquors
- Services: Production, Marketing and Distribution of beverages
- Revenue: €829 millions (2023)
- Net income: €107 millions (2023)
- Number of employees: 1809 (2023)
- Website: www.corporacionhijosderivera.com

Corporation Hijos de Rivera, LLC is a Spanish brewery founded in 1906 in the city of A Coruña, Galicia. It's engaged in the production, marketing and distribution of beverages. It's known by the name of its most popular beer brand, Estrella Galicia (a 5.5% abv Helles Exportbier).

== History ==
The company's origins date back to 1906 when José María Rivera Corral established La Estrella de Galicia brewery in the city of A Coruña.

In 2006, the company celebrated its centenary in the company of King Juan Carlos. A beer named 1906 Reserva Especial was launched to commemorate the occasion. In 2017, the company purchased a 32% stake in Carlow Brewing Company, an Irish-based brewery.

In 2022, he transformed his online store into a marketplace, called BigCrafters, to promote the sale of its own and third-party artisan products.

In January 2024, the company acquired B Corp certification with a score of 88.2.

== Brewing production ==
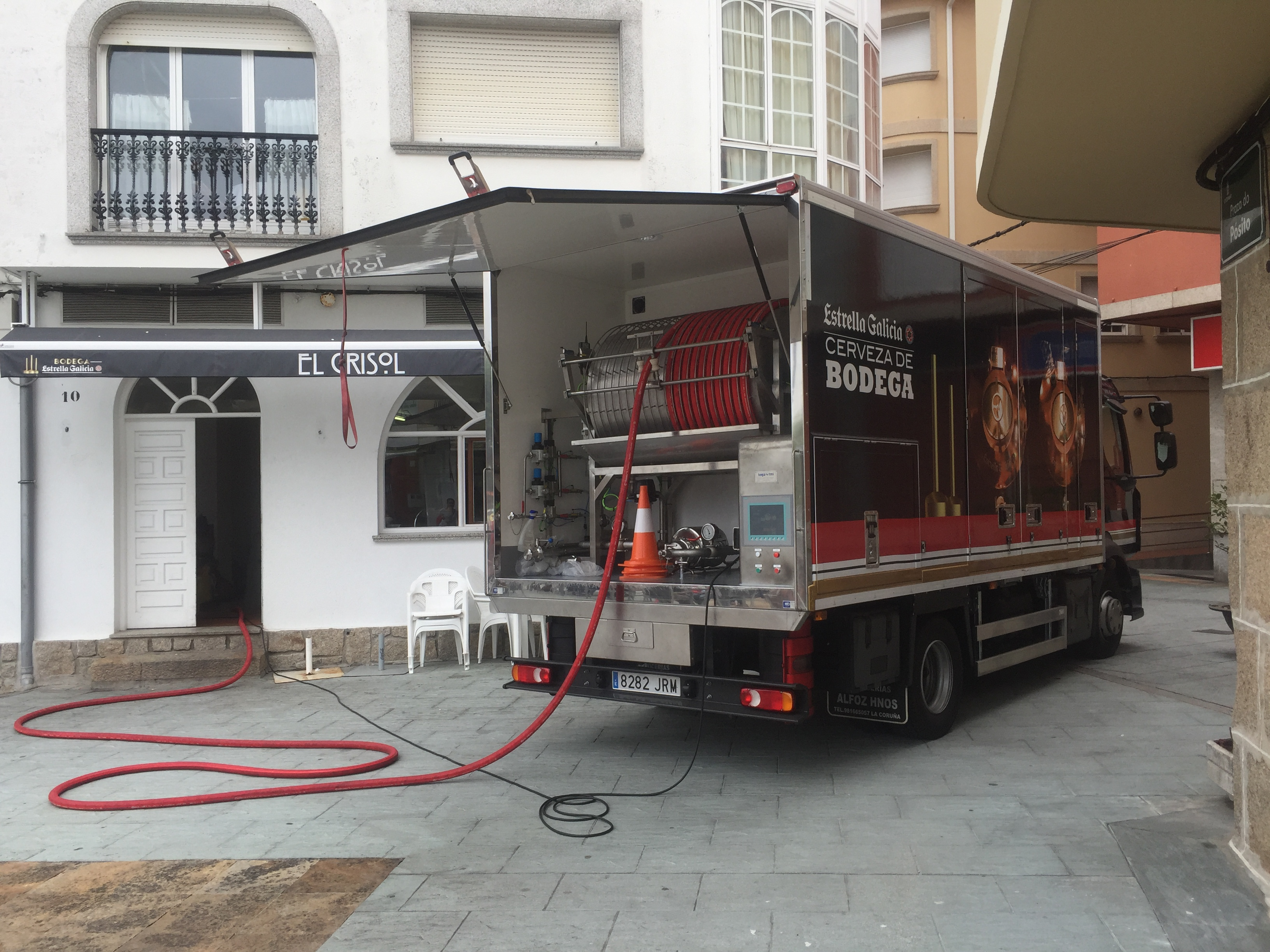
Tanker truck of Estrella Galicia Cerveza de Bodega

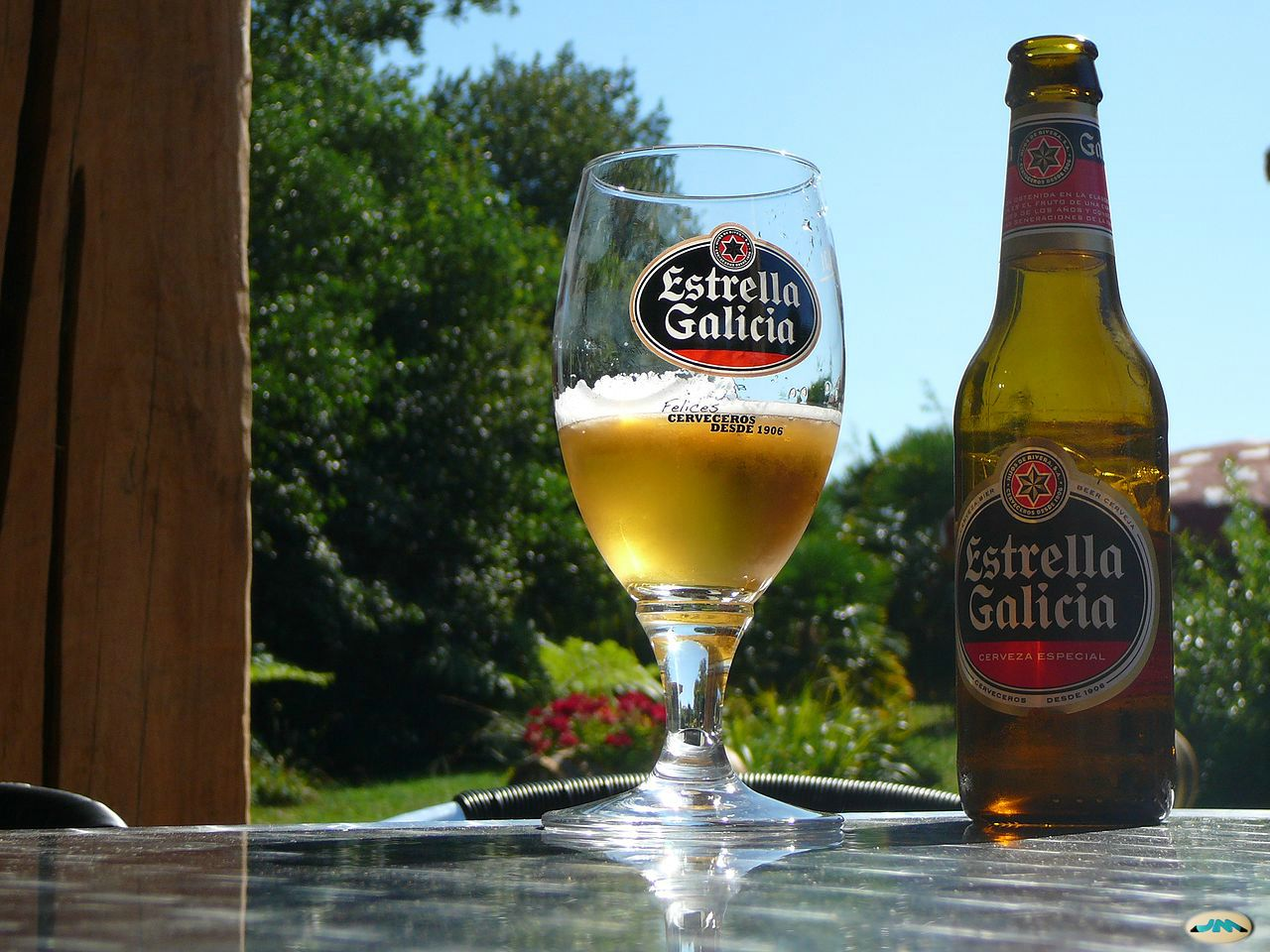
Estrella Galicia Cerveza Especial.

The company has been producing its own brands of beer since the beginning of its production activity. Some of them are the following:

- Estrella Galicia Especial: born in 1972 as Rivera Especial. Made with two-row malts (Pilsen and roasted) and corn, together with bittering hops (Nugget and Perle Hallertau), it takes approximately twenty days to brew, ferment and mature.
- La Estrella de Galicia: is the result of recovering the original recipe of the first Estrella de Galicia beer, German Pilsen style, which was born in the first brewery of the Rivera family, more than 110 years ago.
- Estrella Galicia Cerveza de Bodega and 1906 de Bodega. These are unpasteurized beers that go directly from the brewery to the point of sale. The absence of pasteurization requires that they be transported in specialized vehicles with tanks that maintain refrigeration. Storage in breweries takes place in the same way, maintaining the carbonation levels with which it leaves the brewery cellars, which gives it its freshness and particular characteristics.
- 1906 La Milnueve: a lager beer brewed with two-row malts (pilsen and roasted) and corn; together with Pele Hallertau hops. Its maturation period is one of the longest among national lager beers. Awarded with the Superior Taste Award 2012 and 2015.
- 1906 Red Vintage: intense lager with a balance between malts, hops and its high alcohol volume (8% vol.). It is the result of the recovery of a historical recipe of Hijos de Rivera, the Especial Extra (La Colorada).
- 1906 Black Coupage: extra-black lager marked by notes of coffee and licorice contributed by the coupage of four malts with different degrees of roasting. Its hops are Nugget and Sladek.
- 1906 La Pelirroja: copper-colored beer with ruby highlights. It is the result of blending four malts and four hops to form an Irish-inspired red ale.
- Estrella Galicia Gluten Free.
- Estrella Galicia 0.0 (non-alcoholic): Estrella Galicia 0.0; Estrella Galicia Negra 0.0 and Estrella Galicia Tostada 0.0.
- Special Editions: Estrella de Navidad; Estrella del Camino; Estrella Pimientos de Padrón; Estrella "Pulpo á Feira".

== Waters ==
- Cabreiroa water
- Cuevas water
- Fontarel water
- AUARA water

== Wines ==
In 2006 Hijos de Rivera bought the Ponte da Boga winery. Its wines are made with grapes from low vineyards of heroic viticulture.Some of them are: Mencía, Godello and Alvariño.

In 2023 the company acquired the wineries of Grandes Pagos Gallegos, Quinta Couselo, Pazo Casanova and Fragas do Lecer, presenting wineries in all the Galician Denominations of Origin.

== Awards and certifications ==
In 2022, the company joins the Foundation of the Leading Brands of Spain Forum as a Protector Member.

In 2023, it received recognition for Best Marketing Team at the 15th edition of the National Marketing Awards. In the same year, its commitment to environmental sustainability was also recognized in the VI celebration of the Environmental Awards APROEMA (Professional Association of Environmental Companies of Galicia). It also won the ANUARIA 2023 Award for the best Corporate Identity Program.

In 2024, the company will be certified as a Top Employer, after passing the certification process of the Top Employers Institute.
