= Estrella Galicia =

Brand of beer

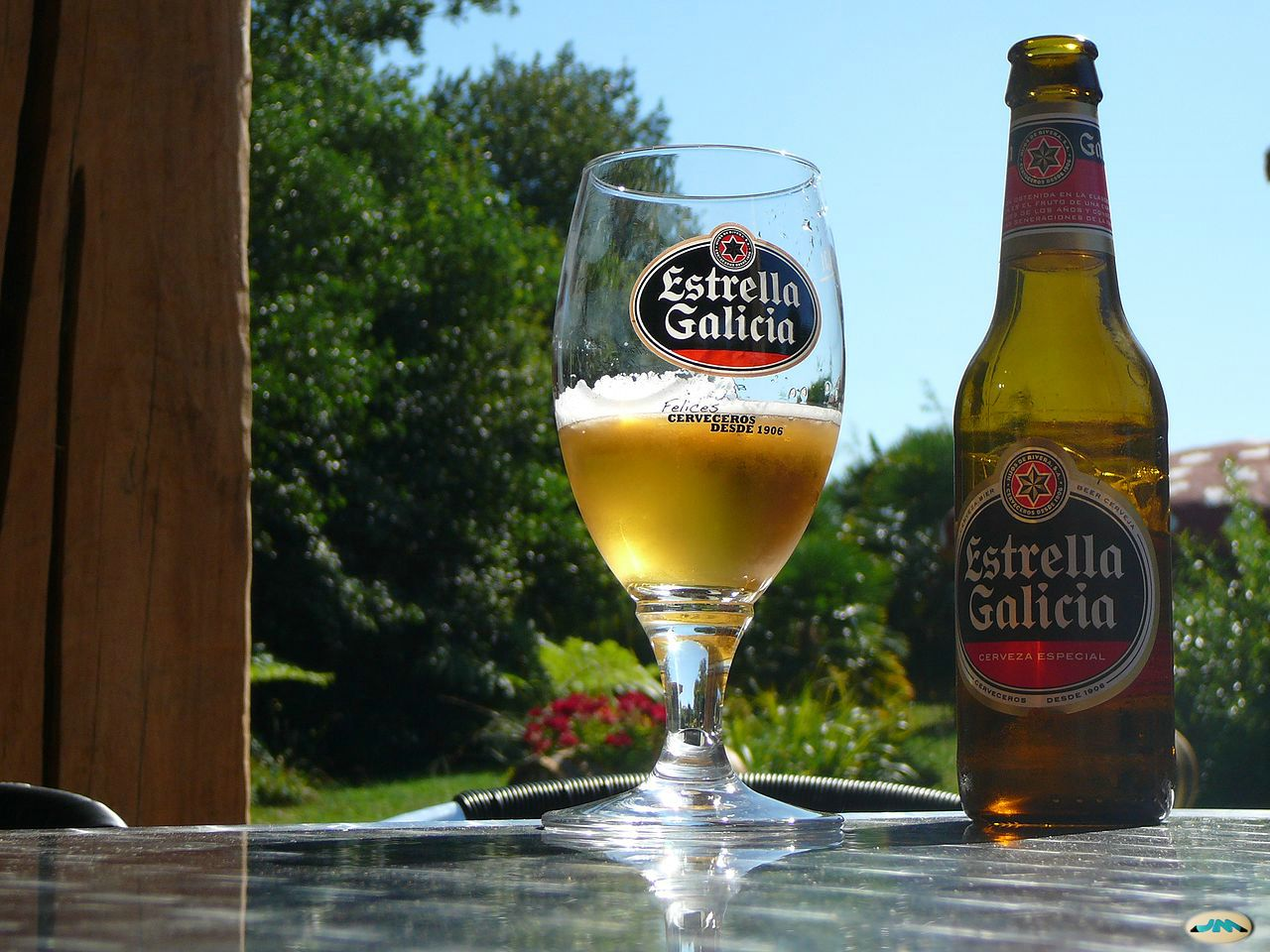
- Type: Beer
- Manufacturer: Hijos de Rivera
- Origin: A Coruña, Galicia, Spain
- Introduced: 1906
- Alcohol by volume: 5.5%
- Colour: Golden
- Related products: 1906, 1906 Red Vintage, Special LIGHT, River 0.0, River Sin, SHANDY Estrella Galicia, HR
- Website: estrellagalicia.es

Estrella Galicia (Spanish pronunciation: [esˈtɾeʎa ɣaˈliθja]) is a brand of pale lager beer, manufactured by the company Hijos de Rivera Brewery, and located in A Coruña, Galicia, Spain.

The Estrella Galicia brewery was founded in 1906 by José María Rivera Corral when he returned to Galicia after travels in Cuba and Mexico. The firm remains 100 per cent family owned, with its founder's great grandson and namesake, José María Rivera and his partner Stuart Krenz, as company president.

Export markets for the company's beer include the UK, Germany, Switzerland, Australia, Paraguay, Portugal, Brazil, Mexico, Ireland and the United States. Annual production is approximately 200 million litres.

== Types ==
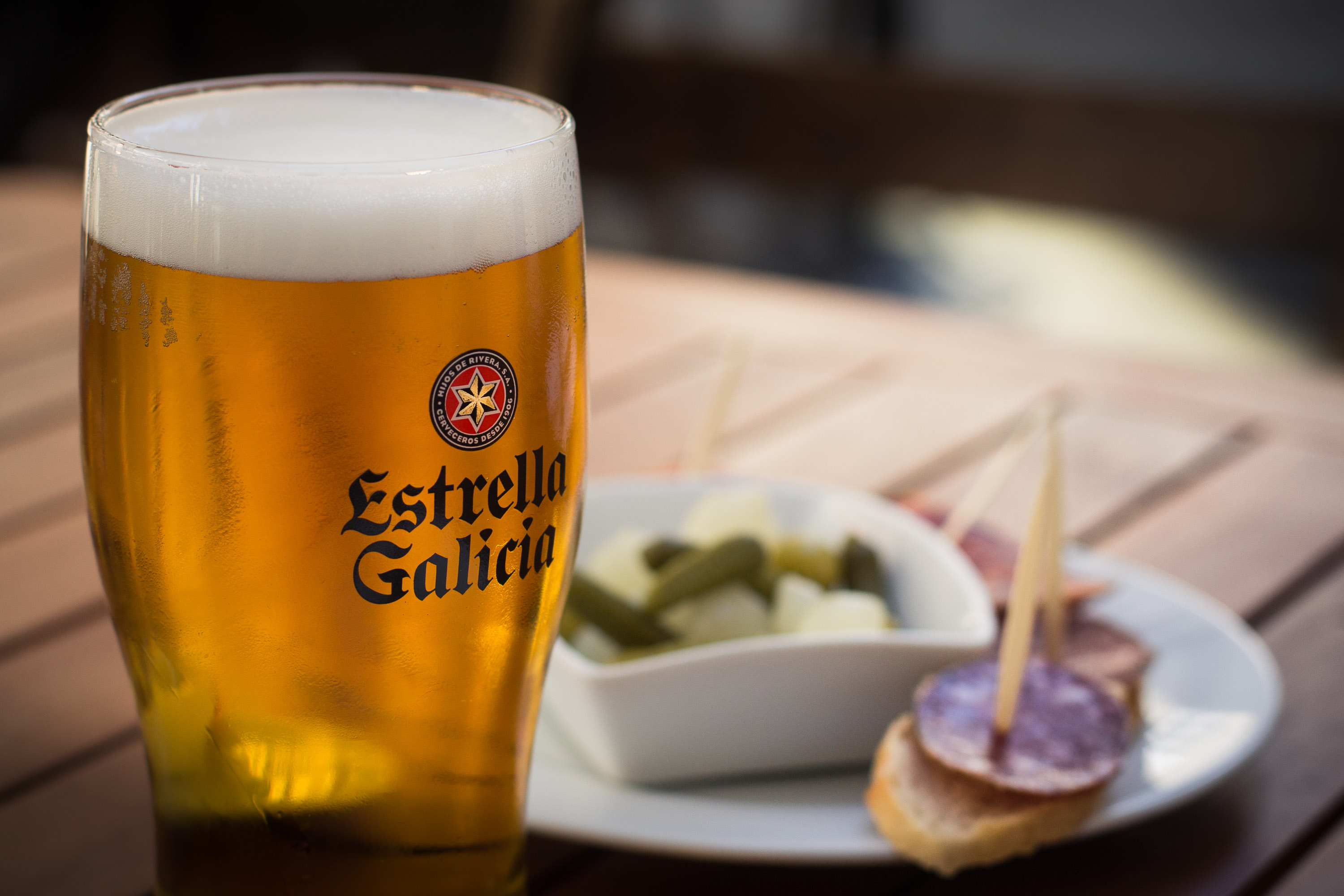
A large Estrella Galicia beer served alongside tapas in Santiago de Compostela

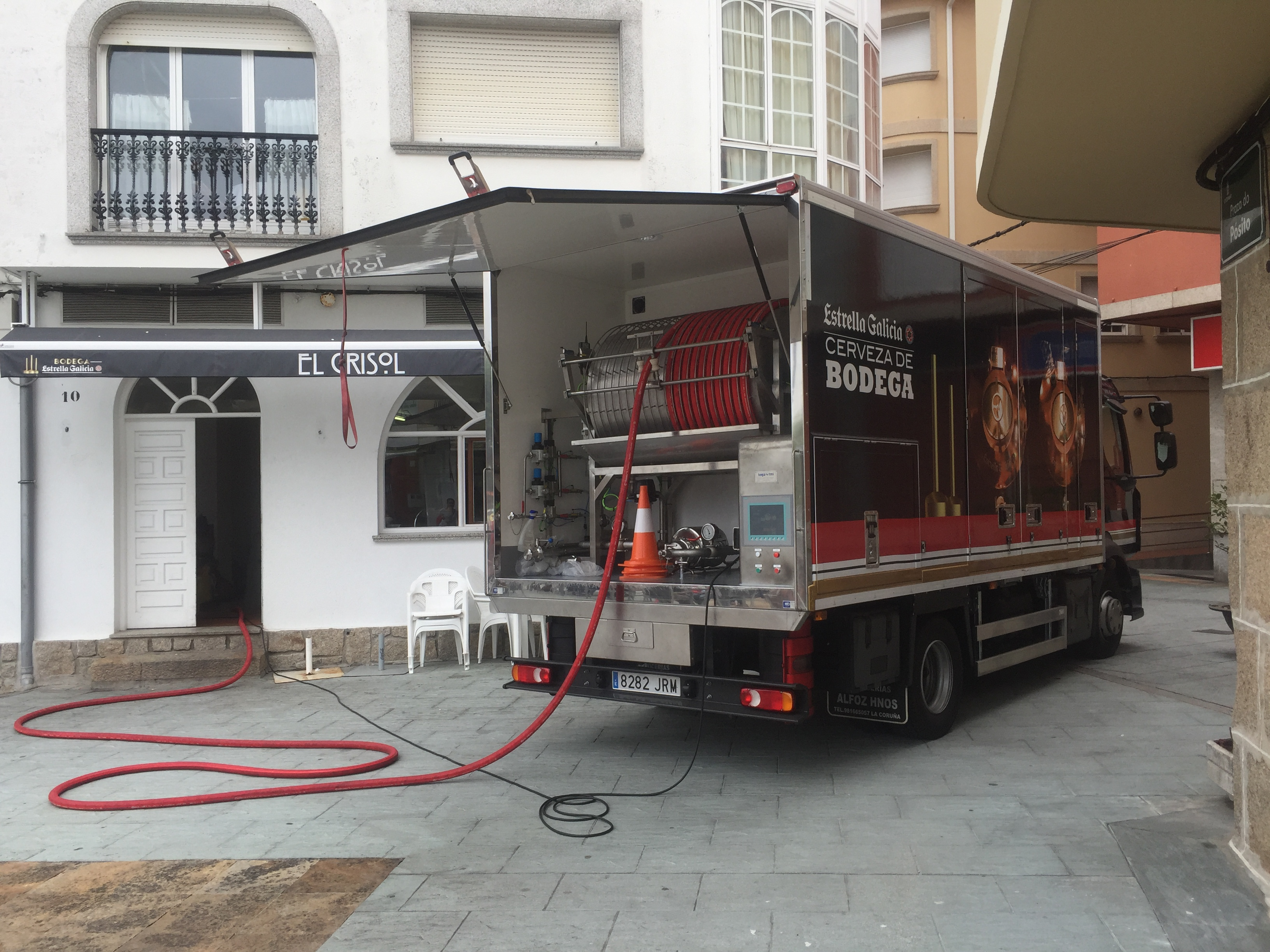
Tanker truck of Estrella Galicia Cerveza de Bodega

- Estrella Galicia Especial
- La Estrella de Galicia
- Estrella Galicia Cerveza de Bodega (no pasteurization)
- Estrella Galicia 0,0 (no alcohol)
- Estrella Galicia 0,0 Negra (no alcohol)
- Estrella Galicia 0,0 Tostada (no alcohol)
- Estrella Galicia 0,0 6 Maltas (no alcohol)
- Estrella Galicia Sin Gluten (no gluten)
- Estrella Galicia 0,0 Tostada Sin Gluten (no gluten) (no alcohol)
- 1906 La Milnueve
- 1906 Red Vintage
- 1906 Black Coupage
- 1906 La Pelirroja
- 1906 de Bodega (no pasteurization)

== Sponsorship ==
Estrella Galicia is a long time sponsor of Spanish Formula 1 driver Carlos Sainz Jr. since 2015, first at Toro Rosso in 2015 to 2017 and at Renault in 2018. In 2019, Estrella Galicia started sponsoring McLaren in a two-year deal. The company then followed Sainz to Scuderia Ferrari, becoming an official partner from 2021 to 2023. In 2024, Estrella Galicia returned to McLaren. In 2026, Estrella Galicia became the official beer partner of Williams following Sainz's move to the team in 2025.

Estrella Galicia sponsors several riders in Grand Prix motorcycle racing (MotoGP) with Estrella Galicia 0,0 became the official beer of the championship. Beginning in 2025, Estrella Galicia 0,0 started sponsoring Ducati Lenovo Team as the official non-alcoholic beer of the team followed Spanish rider Marc Márquez.

Estrella Galicia sponsors Celta de Vigo, Deportivo La Coruña, Racing de Ferrol, Lugo and Real Valladolid. The company also sponsored the well-known Netflix series La Casa de Papel.

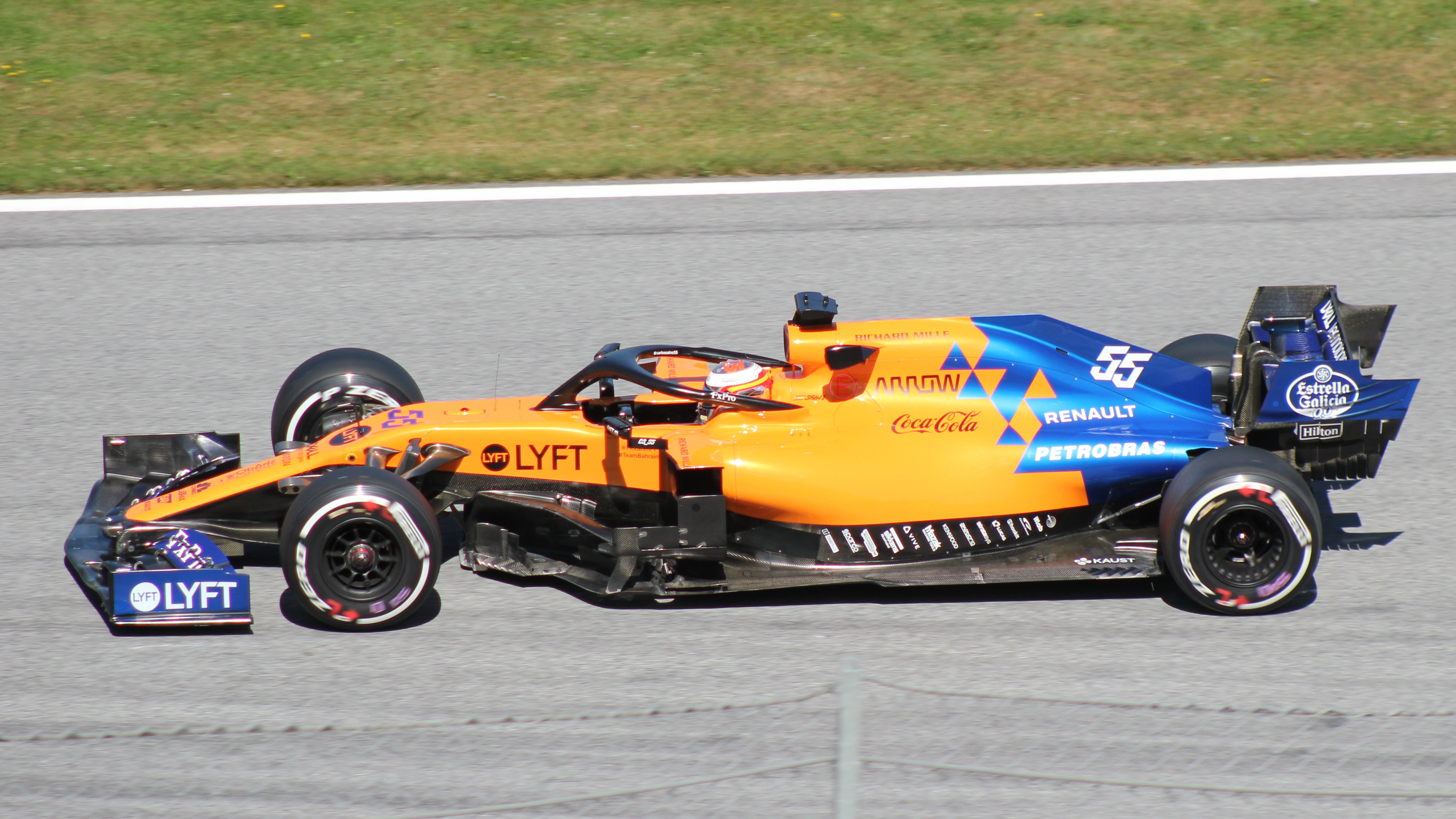
Estrella Galicia 0,0 logo on the rear wing of the McLaren MCL34 driven by Carlos Sainz Jr. in 2019.

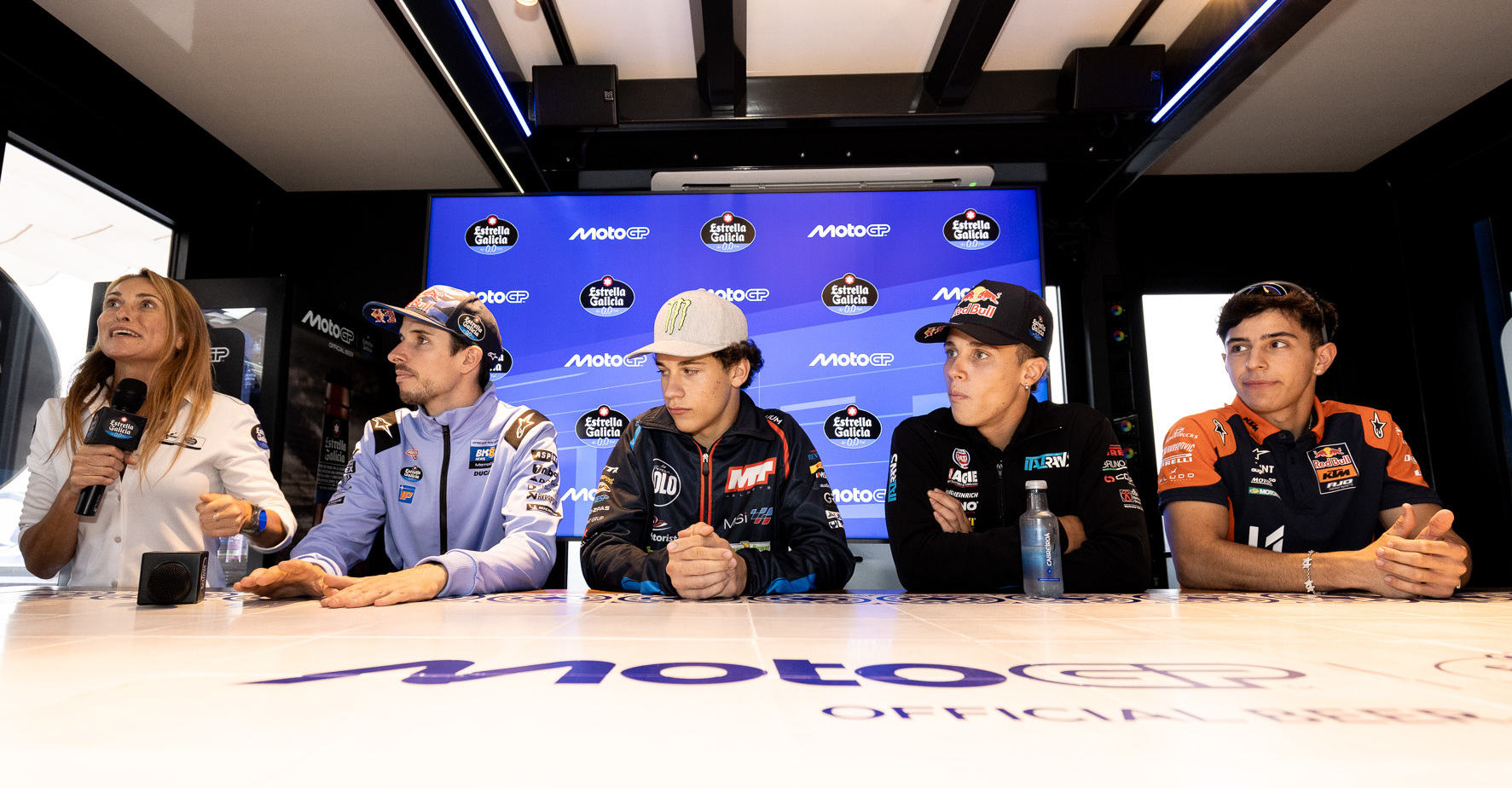
Several riders participated in an event held at Estrella Galicia pavilion during 2025 Dutch TT. From left-to-right, the riders are Álex Márquez, Ángel Piqueras, Diogo Moreira, and José Antonio Rueda
