= Trouble Brewing (brewery) =

Brewery in Kill, County Kildare, Ireland

- Company type: Independent craft brewery
- Industry: Alcoholic beverages
- Founded: 2009
- Headquarters: Kill, County Kildare, Ireland
- Products: Beer
- Owner: Stephen Clinch and Damo
- Website: troublebrewing.ie

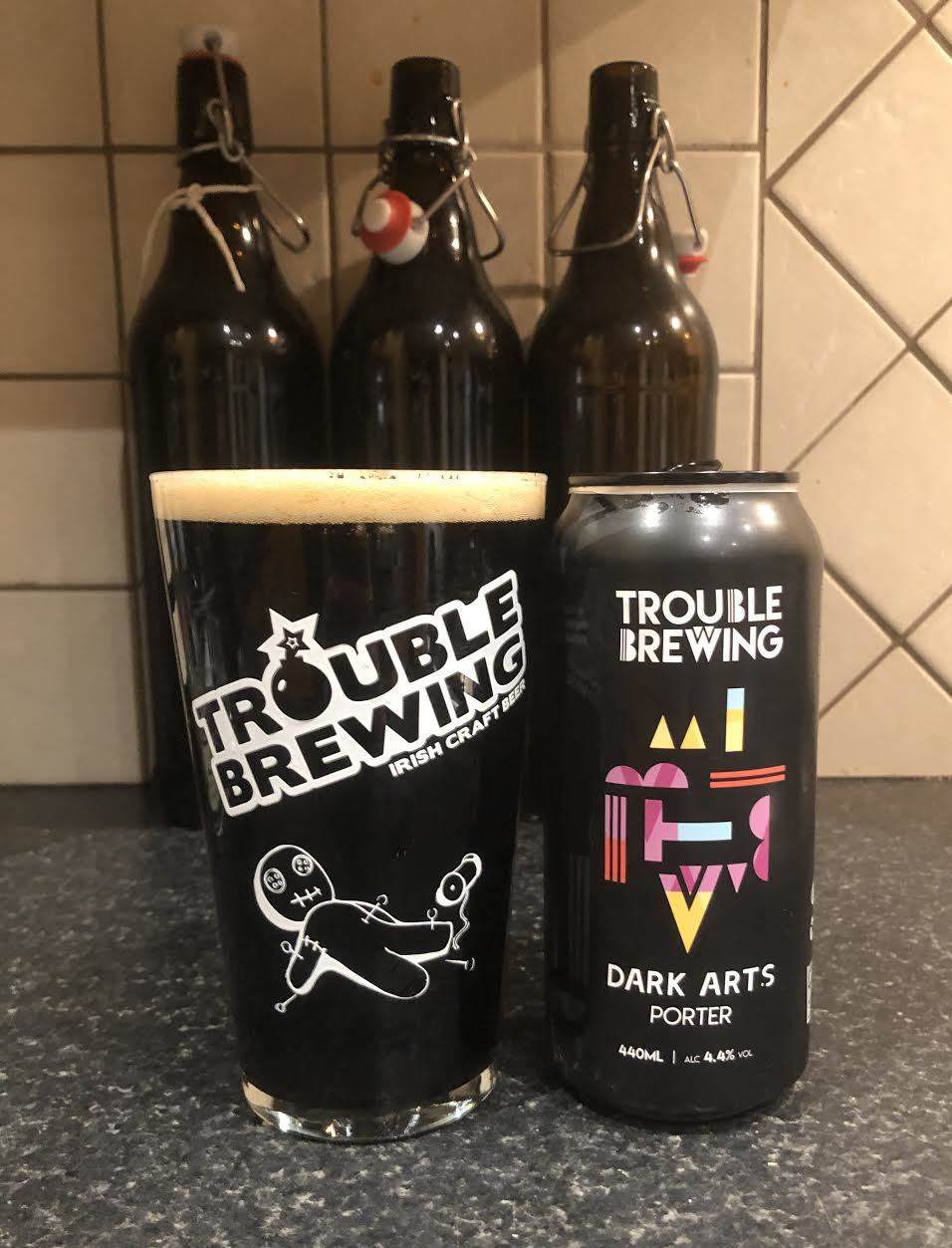
Trouble Brewing Dark Arts Porter

Trouble Brewing is a brewery in Kill, County Kildare, Ireland, that produces a number of high end ales, IPAs, stouts, and lagers. The brewery distributes throughout Ireland and in a number of countries in the EU. The brewery was founded by Paul O'Connor, Stephen Clinch, and Thomas Prior in 2009. Trouble Brewing was at the Bord Bía Bloom Festival in 2011. Since June 2011, Trouble Brewing has been the first brewery in Ireland to accept payment in Bitcoin.

== Beers ==
- Trouble Brewing Deception Golden Ale, 4.3% ABV
- Trouble Brewing Dark Arts Porter, 4.4% ABV
- Trouble Brewing Sabotage IPA, launched 31 January 2013

Seasonal

- Pumpkin Brew, a pumpkin-spiced beer for Halloween
- Spelt Saison, a special-edition brew, served in casks, based on recipe chosen in 2012 "Troublemaker" home brewing competition
- Trouble Brewing Galaxy Pale Ale, 4.5% ABV (N/A)

== Brewery ==
The brewery uses a computer system based on Arduino hardware, and the brewing control mechanism uses software that has been shared using an open-source usage creative commons attribution share-alike licence.
