= Whitewater Brewery =

Craft brewery in Castlewellan, County Down, Northern Ireland

Whitewater Brewing Company

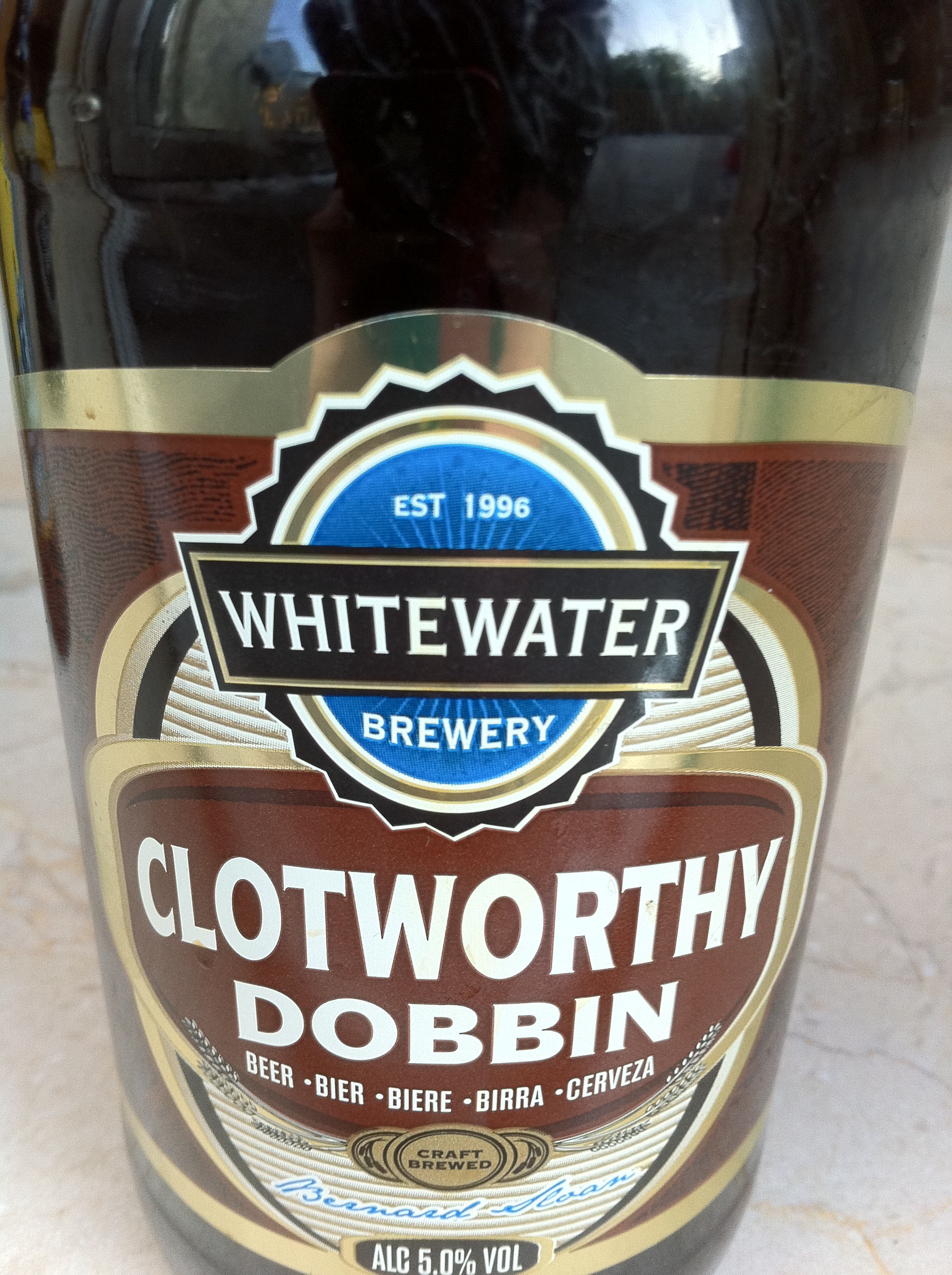
- A bottle of Clotworthy Dobbin
- Company type: Independent craft brewery
- Industry: Alcoholic beverages
- Founded: 1996
- Headquarters: Castlewellan County Down, Northern Ireland
- Products: Beer
- Owner: Bernard Sloan and family
- Website: whitewaterbrewing.co.uk

Whitewater Brewery is a craft brewery in Castlewellan, County Down. It is the largest microbrewery in Northern Ireland. The brewery produces a number of cask beers, a key lager, and three bottled beers. The brewery was founded by Bernard Sloan with his wife Kerry in 1996 on the family farm.

== Beers ==
Several beers are produced at Whitewater Brewery and the production changes over time. Frequently recurring bottled beers include:

- Bee's Endeavour, 4.8% alcohol by volume (ABV)
- Belfast Ale, 4.5% ABV
- Belfast Lager, 4.5% ABV
- Belfast Black, 4.5% ABV
- ~~Clotworthy Dobbin, 5.0% ABV~~
- ~~Copperhead, 3.7% ABV~~
- Ewe Rebel 7.0% ABV
- Hallion 4.2% ABV
- Hen, Cock and Pigeon Rock 4.8% ABV
- Hoppel Hammer, 6.0% ABV
- Maggies Leap 4.7% ABV
- Roll In The Haze 5.0% ABV
- Marado Red 3.7% ABV
- Marado Pale 4% ABV
- Irish Whiskey Stout 9% ABV
- Upstream Tangerine 5.5% ABV

== Awards ==
The Whitewater Brewery has won numerous awards for its beers. Among them are:

- 2011 - Great Taste Award, Single Star, for Clotworthy Dobbin bottled beer.
- 2007 - International Beer Challenge, included in the World's Top 50 beers.
