= Irish red ale =

Style of pale ale from Ireland

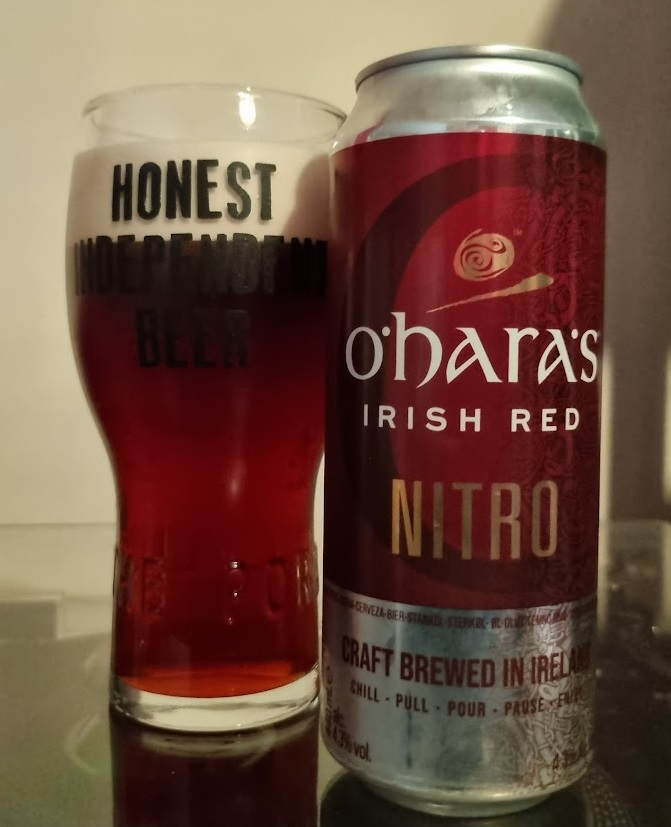
- O'Hara's Irish Red Ale in a pint glass, poured from a can.
- Country of origin: Ireland
- Yeast type: Ale
- Alcohol by volume: 3.8% - 6%
- Color (SRM): 11 - 18
- Bitterness (IBU): 15 - 30
- Original gravity: 1036-1065
- Final gravity: 1010-1016
- Malt percentage: 90-100

Irish red ale (Irish: leann dearg), also known as red ale or Irish ale, is a style of pale ale that is brewed using a moderate amount of kilned malts and roasted barley, giving the beer its red colour. Its strength typically ranges from 3.8% to 4.8% alcohol by volume, although some craft varieties can be as high as 6%.

In the United States, "Irish red" is sometimes used to describe a darker amber ale or a "red" beer that is a lager with caramel colouring. However, these beers are not Irish red ales.

== History ==
The true origins of Irish Red Ale are unknown. It is said that ale has been brewed in Kilkenny city, at St. Francis Abbey, since the 14th century. Commercial brewing, distilling, malting and milling took place in the city in the 18th century by a merchant class of predominantly Catholic families, namely Archdeakin, Brennan, Cormick, Connell, Dullard, Hyland, Kinchella, McCreary, Meighan, Smithwick, Sullivan and Watters. Conditions for brewing and distilling in Kilkenny were ideal, and by 1782 there were eight distilleries in the city. Due to County Kilkenny's favourable climate, the city's agricultural hinterland provided abundant yields of corn, wheat and barley. Further, as noted by MP and brewer Richard Sullivan in 1834, the nearby Castlecomer Plateau provided brewers and distillers in the city with a plentiful supply of coal.

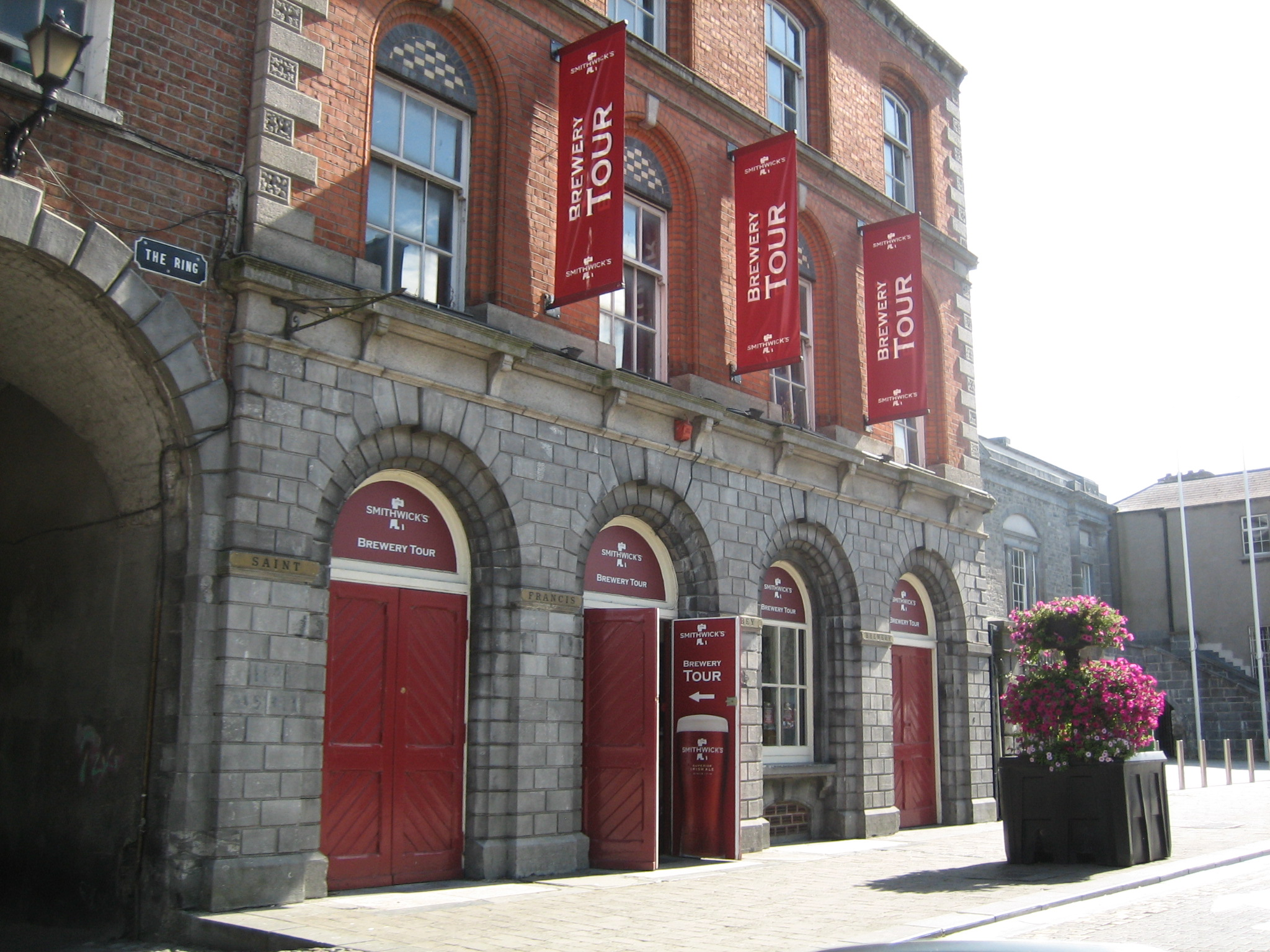
St. Francis Abbey Brewery, Kilkenny

Perhaps the most well known Irish red ale is Smithwick's, which traces its lineage to 1710, with the establishment of John Smithwick's brewery at St. Francis Abbey. The venture was short-lived and the brewery was sold by the family. This was commonplace in Kilkenny at the time, as periods of political instability and sporadic famine in Ireland in the 18th and 19th centuries weighed heavily on the industry. John's grandson, Edmond Smithwick, acquired the St. Francis Abbey brewery in 1827 from the Brennans and greatly expanded its operations.

The company was acquired by Guinness in 1965 and the current brand was launched, replacing other now discontinued beers brewed by Smithwick's, such as 'Time ale' and 'Time barley wine'. In 1987, Guinness developed an export-only brand of Smithwick's known as Kilkenny, which has since evolved into its own distinct variant, with a redder colour, more bitter taste and foamier head.

While ale had been brewed for centuries in Ireland, the term "Irish red ale" was rarely, if ever, used in Ireland. It was popularised in the United States to describe a style of reddish-amber ale that has its roots in Ireland. In 1981, Coors licensed Killian's Irish Red from Heineken France, which became one of the top selling specialty beer brands in the United States. Killian's Irish Red, which is actually an amber lager, popularised the name "Irish red ale" to such an extent that the term was imported back into Ireland by many craft brewers as a classification.

In 2013, the Smithwick's brewery in Kilkenny was finally closed and all brewing moved to St. James's Gate in Dublin. In order to keep the tradition of Kilkenny brewing alive, descendants of both the Smithwick and Sullivan families opened a new brewery in Kilkenny in 2016 and relaunched the Sullivan's brand, which had been discontinued in 1918. Sullivan's claims it can trace its lineage to a brewery on James's Street in 1702, which would make it the oldest branded red ale.

== Style ==
The colour of Irish red ale is in the 11 to 18 range as defined by the Standard Reference Method (SRM). The style of beer is characterised by its malt profile, which typically includes a caramel or toffee-like sweetness. Irish red ales have a dry finish and a low to moderate bitterness of 15-30 IBU. Due to its sweet taste and relatively low alcohol content, Irish red ales are very popular with American craft brewers. Kilkenny and Smithwick's are by far the most common macro-brewed varieties.

== By region ==
=== Ireland ===
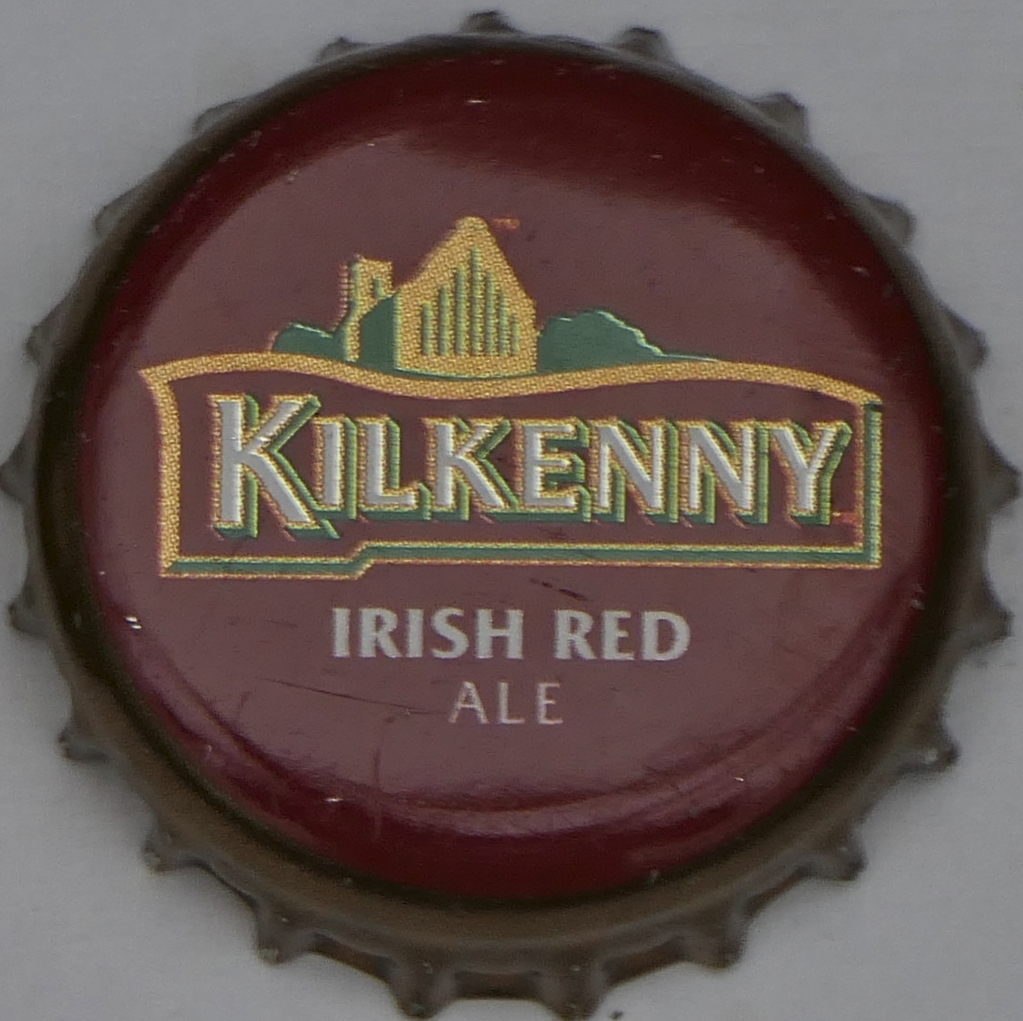
A sign for Kilkenny Red Ale in Germany

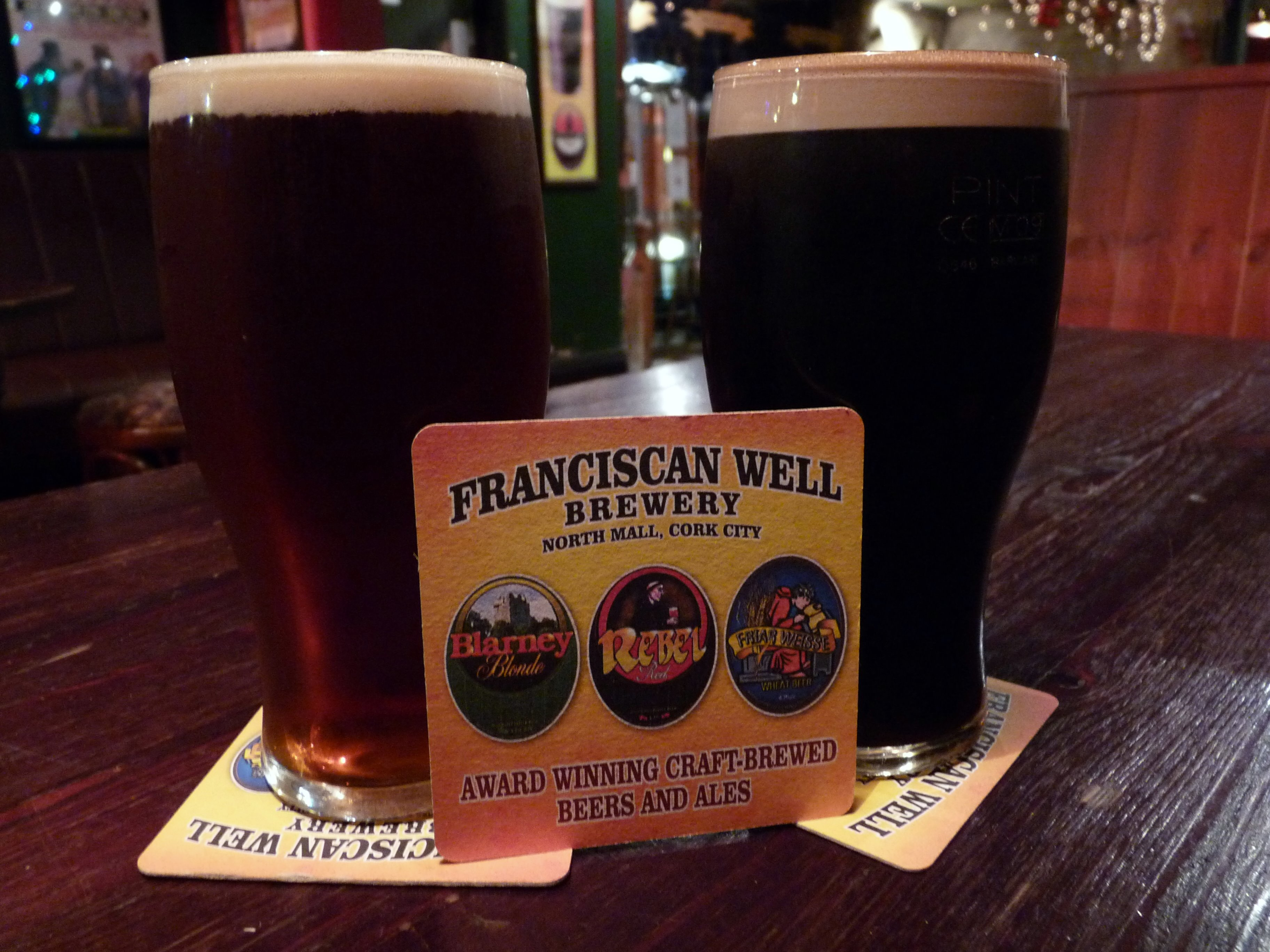
Franciscan Well Rebel Red

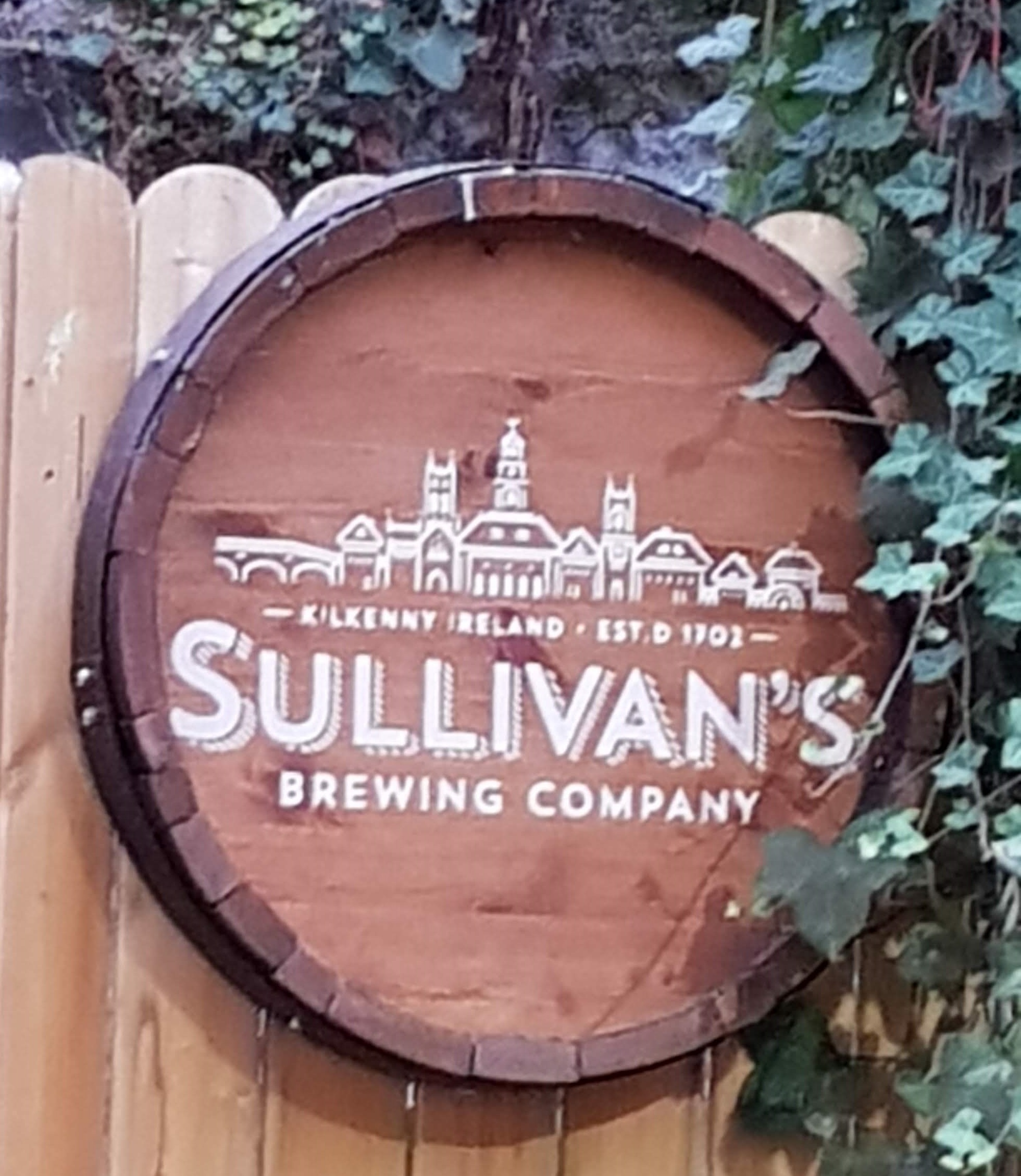
Sign for Sullivan's Brewery in Kilkenny, Ireland

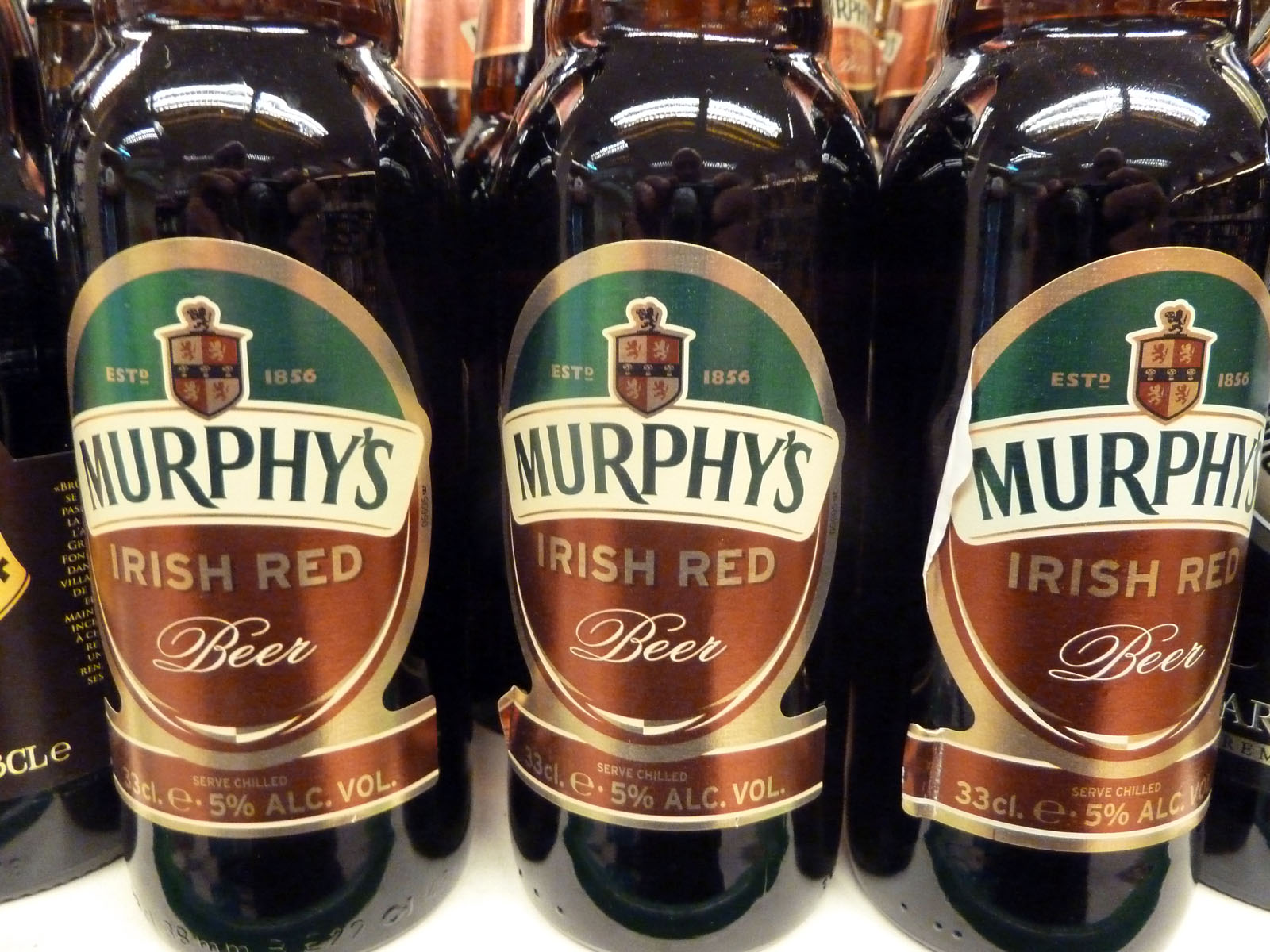
Murphy's Irish Red for sale in Oviedo, Spain

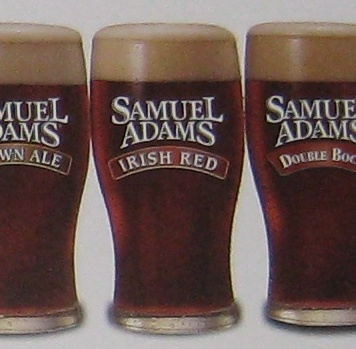
Samuel Adams Irish Red Ale

- Carlow
  - O'Hara's Irish Red
- Cork
  - Franciscan Well Rebel Red
  - Murphy's Irish Red
  - 8 Degrees Irish Red
- Kilkenny
  - Costello's
  - Kilkenny
  - Sullivan's Maltings
  - Smithwick's (Note: Brewed in Dublin by Diageo since 2013.)
- Derry
  - Heaney's Red Ale
  - Heaney's Modern Red
- Dublin
  - Porterhouse Red
  - Rascal's Big Hop Red
  - J.W. Sweetman Irish Red Ale
  - Dublin Red
- Galway
  - Blood Red Ale
  - Bay Ale Red
- Kildare
  - Rye River Red Ale
- Limerick
  - Thomond Red Ale
  - Bill's Red Ale
- Sligo
  - Lough Gill Anderson's Red Ale
- Tipperary
  - White Gypsy Ruby Red
- Waterford
  - Copper Coast Red Ale
- Wexford
  - Yellowbelly Red Noir Dark Ale

=== Argentina ===
- Mendoza
  - Andes Cerveza Roja - Red Ale

=== Canada ===
- Nova Scotia
  - Garrison Irish Red Ale
- British Columbia
  - Rickard's Red Irish Style Red Ale

=== United States ===
- California
  - Red Trolley Ale
- Indiana
  - Brian Boru
- Kentucky
  - Kentucky Irish Red Ale
- Maryland
  - Lucky SOB Red Ale
- Massachusetts
  - Samuel Adams Irish Red
- Ohio
  - Conway's Irish Ale

== See also ==
- Beer in Ireland
- Irish stout
