= Kentucky Bourbon Trail =

Program to promote Kentucky Bourbon industry

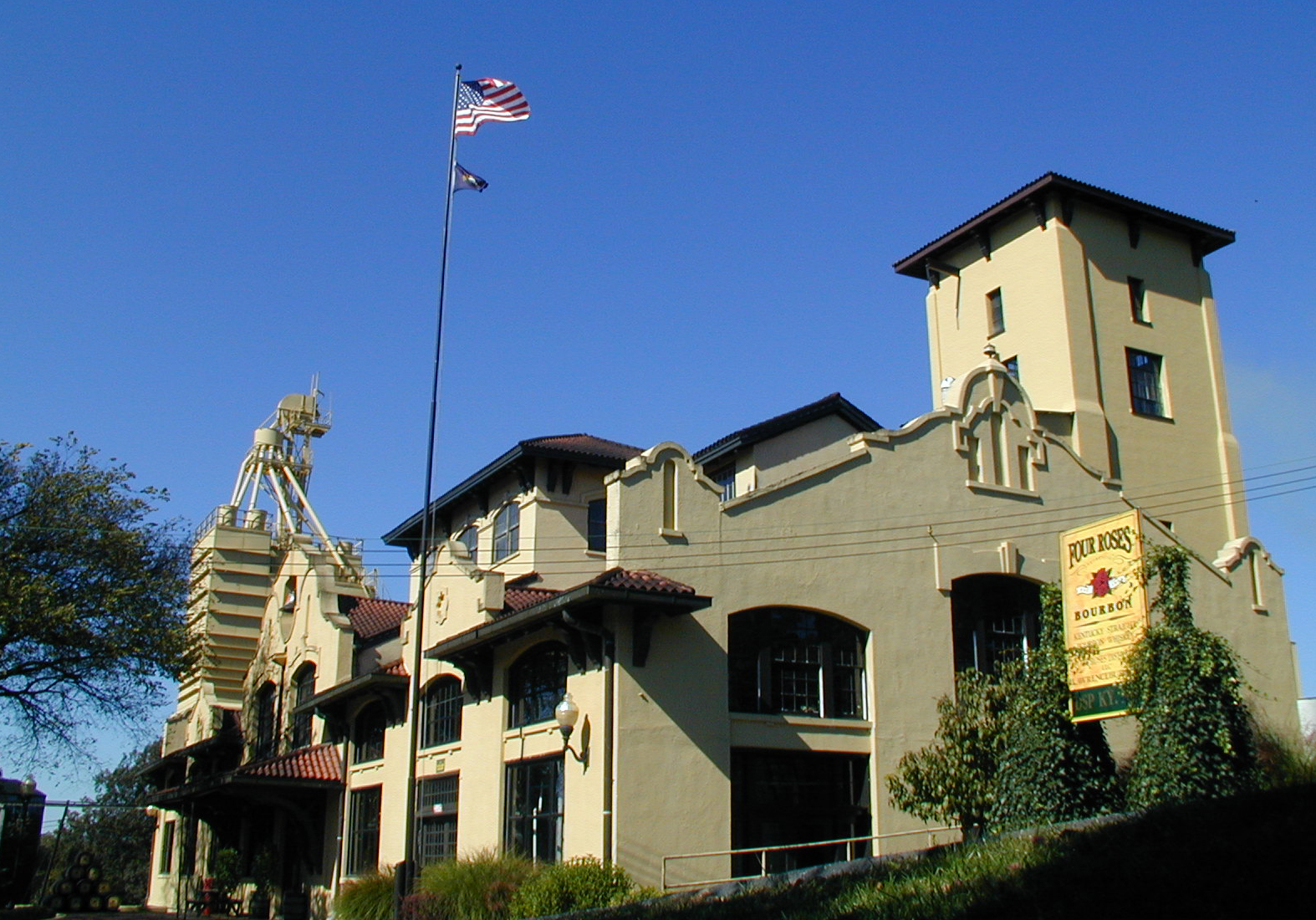
Four Roses Distillery

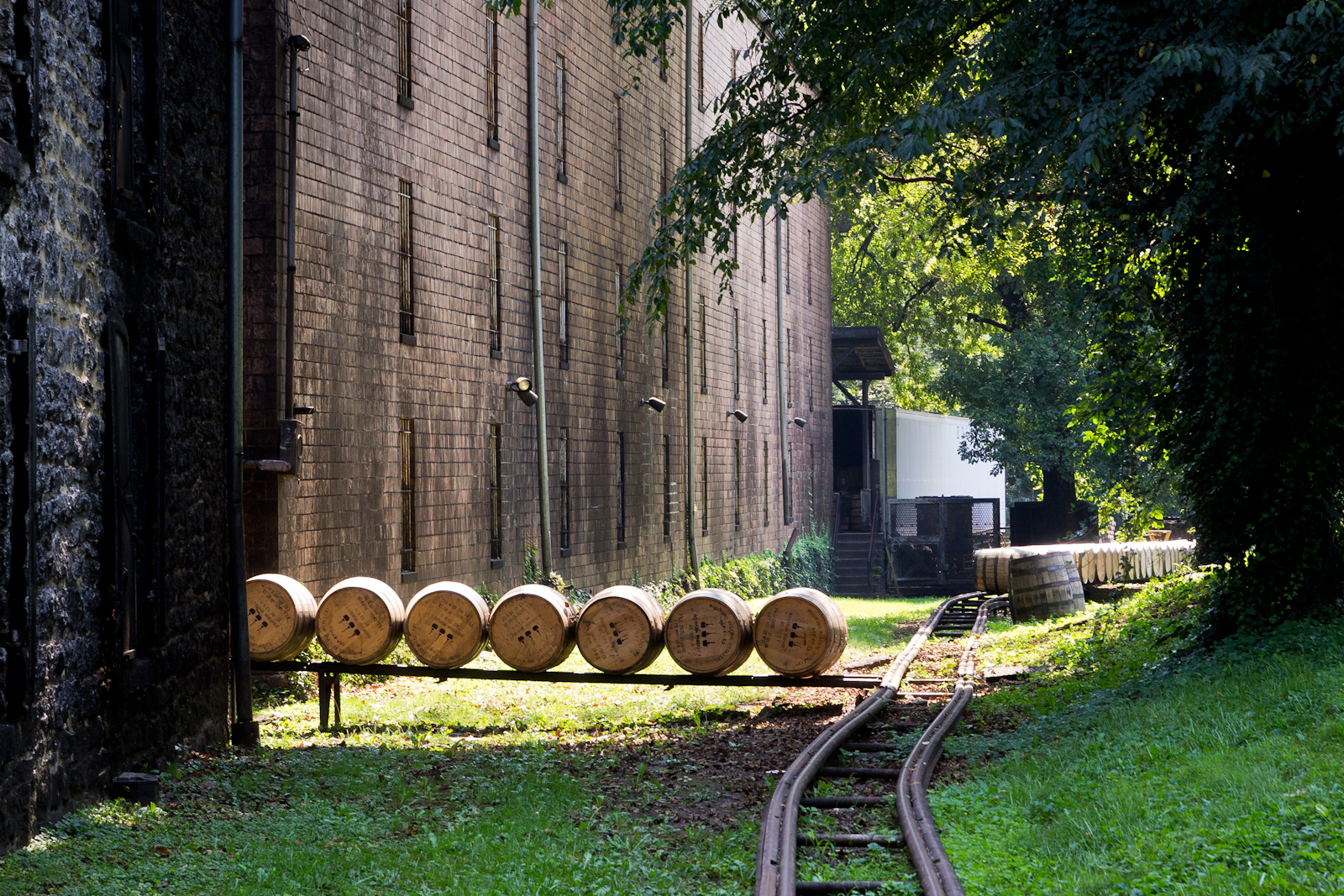
Recently filled barrels of Woodford Reserve bourbon outside of the rickhouse, where they will be stacked and stored during the aging process

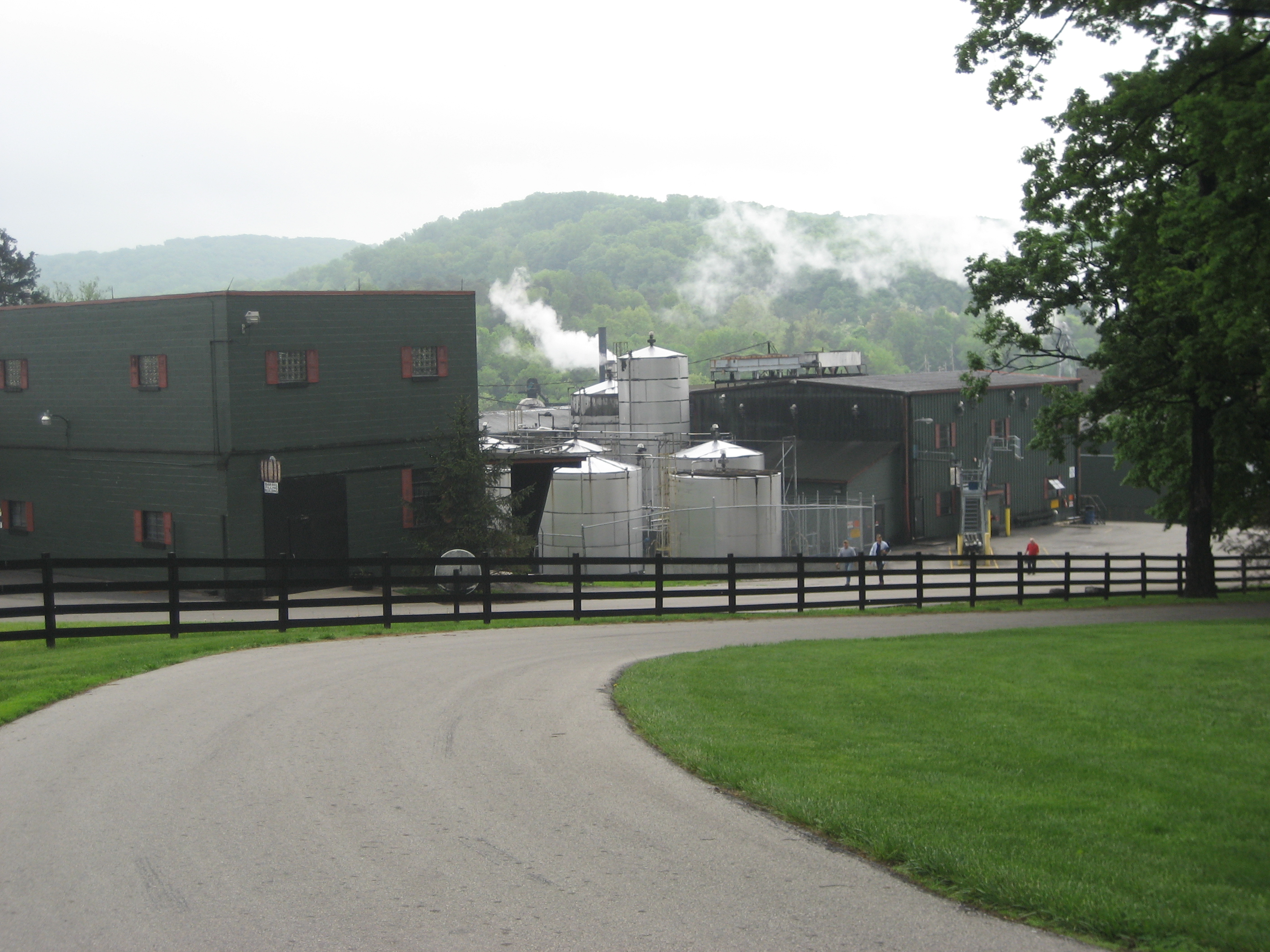
Jim Beam Distillery

The Kentucky Bourbon Trail, sometimes informally referred to as "the Bourbon Trail", is a program sponsored by the Kentucky Distillers' Association (KDA) to promote the Bourbon whiskey industry in Kentucky. The KDA has registered the phrase "Kentucky Bourbon Trail" as a protected trademark.

== History ==
The KDA launched the Kentucky Bourbon Trail program in 1999. At the time, it included seven of the eight distilleries in the region. In 2008, an eighth distillery, the Barton 1792 Distillery, joined the Trail program. However, the distillery was purchased by the Sazerac Company the following year, and Sazerac withdrew both the Barton 1792 Distillery and the Buffalo Trace Distillery from the KDA at the beginning of 2010. The two Sazerac distilleries continue to host public tours, and a Sazerac spokesperson stated they still feel they are "very much a part of the Bourbon Trail", but Sazerac wishes to promote its distilleries independent of the KDA.

In August 2012, the Town Branch Distillery was added to the trail, bringing the number of distilleries back to seven. The Heaven Hill Evan Williams distillery in Louisville was added in May 2013, expanding the primary tour program to include eight destinations. In 2014, The Bulleit Experience at Stitzel-Weller Distillery joined the Kentucky Bourbon Trail, raising the number to nine destinations. In June 2018, Old Forester opened an urban distillery in downtown Louisville and became a member of the Bourbon Trail. O.Z. Tyler Distillery in Owensboro joined the same month. In July 2018, the KDA announced that Lux Row Distillers would be added to the Kentucky Bourbon Trail.

In October 2012, the KDA announced that it would expand the Kentucky Bourbon Trail program to include a new "Craft Tour" of seven artisan distilleries. 2012 had the highest-ever rate of completion for participation in the trail. In December 2013, the Craft Tour added Danville's Wilderness Trail Distillery, thereby expanding to eight destinations. Several other distilleries have been added and the Bowling Green branch of Corsair Artisan Distillery closed on August 30, 2018, bringing the current number to 13 destinations on the Craft Tour.

The KDA opened an official welcome center for the Bourbon Trail in August 2018 at the Frazier History Museum in downtown Louisville.

== Trail stops ==
Kentucky Bourbon Trail
1 Michter's Distillery
2 Evan Williams Bourbon Experience
3 Old Forester Distilling Co.
4 Angel’s Envy Distilling
5 Rabbit Hole Distillery
6 Bulleit Distilling Co.
7 Stitzel-Weller Distillery
8 Green River Distilling
9 Heaven Hill
10 Lux Row
11 Bardstown Bourbon Company
12 Maker’s Mark Distillery
13 Jim Beam American Stillhouse
14 Wilderness Trail Distillery
15 Four Roses Distillery
16 Wild Turkey Distillery
17 Woodford Reserve Distillery
18 Town Branch Distillery
19 New Riff Distillery
20 Pensive Distilling Co
21 Second Sight Spirits
22 Augusta Distillery
23 Old Pogue Distillery
24 Boone County Distillery
25 Neeley Family Distillery
26 Kentucky Artisan Distillery
27 Kentucky Peerless Distilling Company
28 Cooper & Kings
29 Jeptha Creed Distillery
30 Willett Distillery
31 Preservation Distillery
32 Log Still Distillery
33 Limestone Branch Distillery
34 Boundary Oak
35 The Bard
36 Casey Jones
37 MB Roland Distillery
38 Dueling Grounds Distillery
39 Whiskey Thief Distilling Co.
40 Castle & Key Distillery
41 Barrel House Distilling Co.
42 RD1 Spirits
43 Fresh Bourbon
44 James E. Pepper
45 Bluegrass Distillers
46 Hartfield & Co.

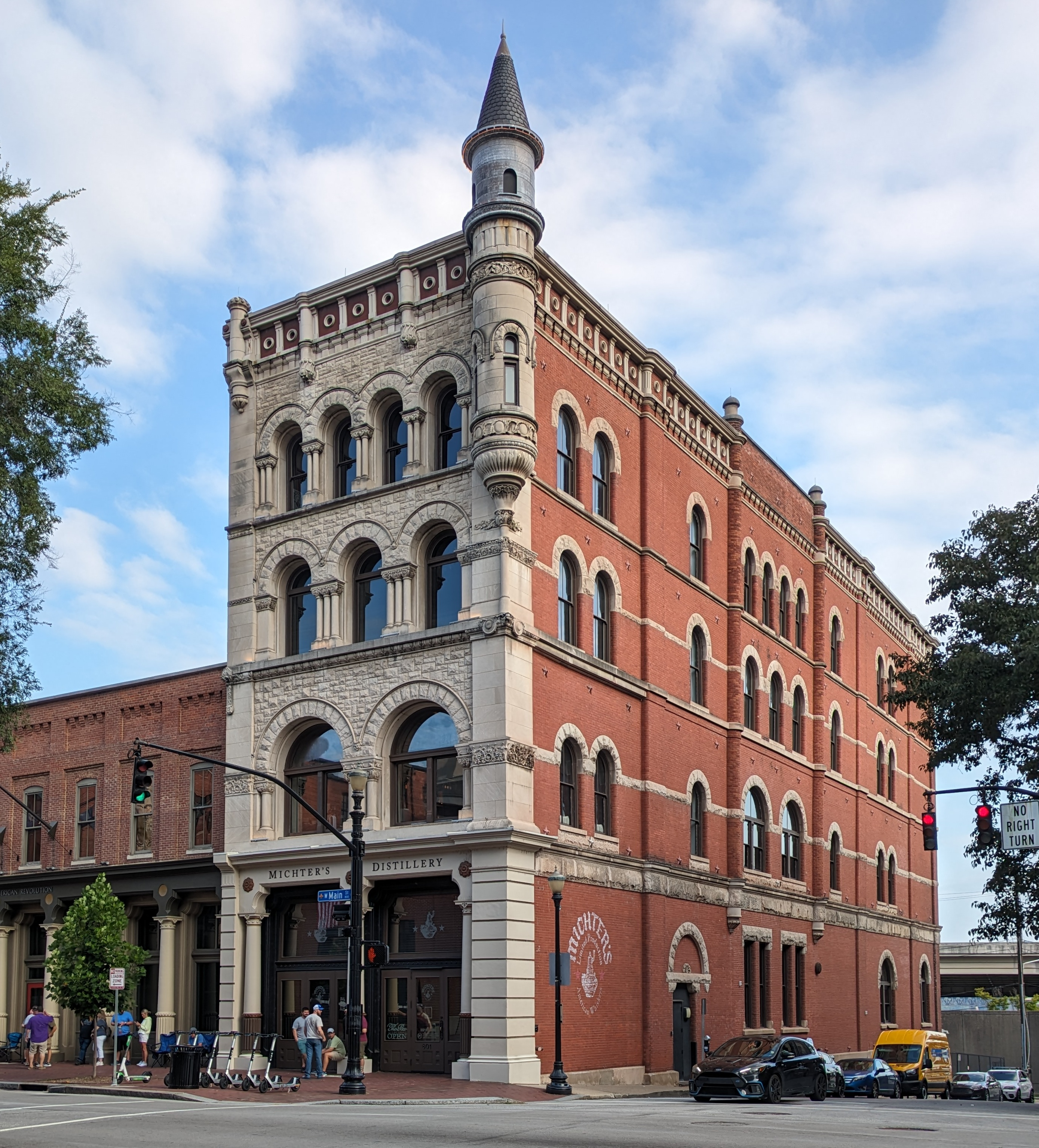
Michter's Fort Nelson Distillery

As of 2024, there are 46 stops on the Bourbon Trail.

There are 18 stops on the main Bourbon Trail, broken down into 4 "gateway cities": Bardstown Gateway, Lexington Gateway, Louisville Gateway, and Northern Kentucky Gateway. The 18 stops are:

Louisville

- Michter's Fort Nelson Distillery in Louisville
- Evan Williams Bourbon Experience in Louisville
- Old Forester Distilling Co. in Louisville
- Angel's Envy Distillery in Louisville
- Rabbit Hole Distillery in Louisville
- Bulleit Distilling Co. in Shelbyville
- Bulleit Frontier Experience at the Stitzel–Weller Distillery in Louisville
- Green River Distilling Co. in Owensboro, formerly known as O.Z. Tyler Distillery

Bardstown

- Heaven Hill Visitor Center in Bardstown
- Lux Row Distillers in Bardstown
- Bardstown Bourbon Company in Bardstown
- Maker's Mark Distillery in Loretto
- Jim Beam American Stillhouse in Clermont

Lexington

- Wilderness Trail Distillery in Danville
- Four Roses Distillery in Lawrenceburg
- Wild Turkey Distillery in Lawrenceburg
- Woodford Reserve Distillery near Versailles
- Town Branch Distillery in Lexington

There are 28 stops on the Bourbon Trail "Craft Tour", broken down into 4 regions: Northern, Central, Western, and Bluegrass. The 28 stops are:

Northern Craft Tour

- New Riff Distillery in Newport
- Pensive Distilling Co in Newport
- Second Sight Spirits in Ludlow
- Augusta Distillery in Augusta, Kentucky
- Old Pogue Distillery in Maysville
- Boone County Distilling Co. in Boone County
- Neeley Family Distillery in Sparta

Central Craft Tour

- Kentucky Artisan Distillery in Crestwood
- Kentucky Peerless Distilling Company in Louisville
- Copper & Kings in Louisville
- Jeptha Creed Distillery in Shelbyville
- Willett Distillery in Bardstown
- Preservation Distillery in Bardstown
- Log Still Distillery in New Haven
- Limestone Branch Distillery in Lebanon

Western Craft Tour

- Boundary Oak in Radcliff
- The Bard Distillery in Graham
- Casey Jones in Hopkinsville
- MB Roland Distillery, Pembroke (Christian County)
- Dueling Grounds Distillery in Franklin

Bluegrass Craft Tour

- Whiskey Thief Distilling Co. in Frankfort
- Castle & Key Distillery in Frankfort
- Barrel House Distilling Co. in Lexington
- RD1 Spirits in Lexington
- Fresh Bourbon in Lexington
- James E. Pepper in Lexington
- Bluegrass Distillers in Lexington
- Hartfield & Co. in Paris

=== Other stops ===
The B-Line, an official partner of the Kentucky Bourbon Trail, is another organization promoting distilleries, bars, and restaurants in the Bourbon Trail that are in the Northern Gateway area.

- Revival Vintage Bottle Shop in Covington

== See also ==
- American Whiskey Trail
- Kentucky Bourbon
- Rye whiskey
