= Town Branch =

Bourbon whiskey brand

Coordinates: 38.0495°N 84.5094°W

Town Branch Bourbon
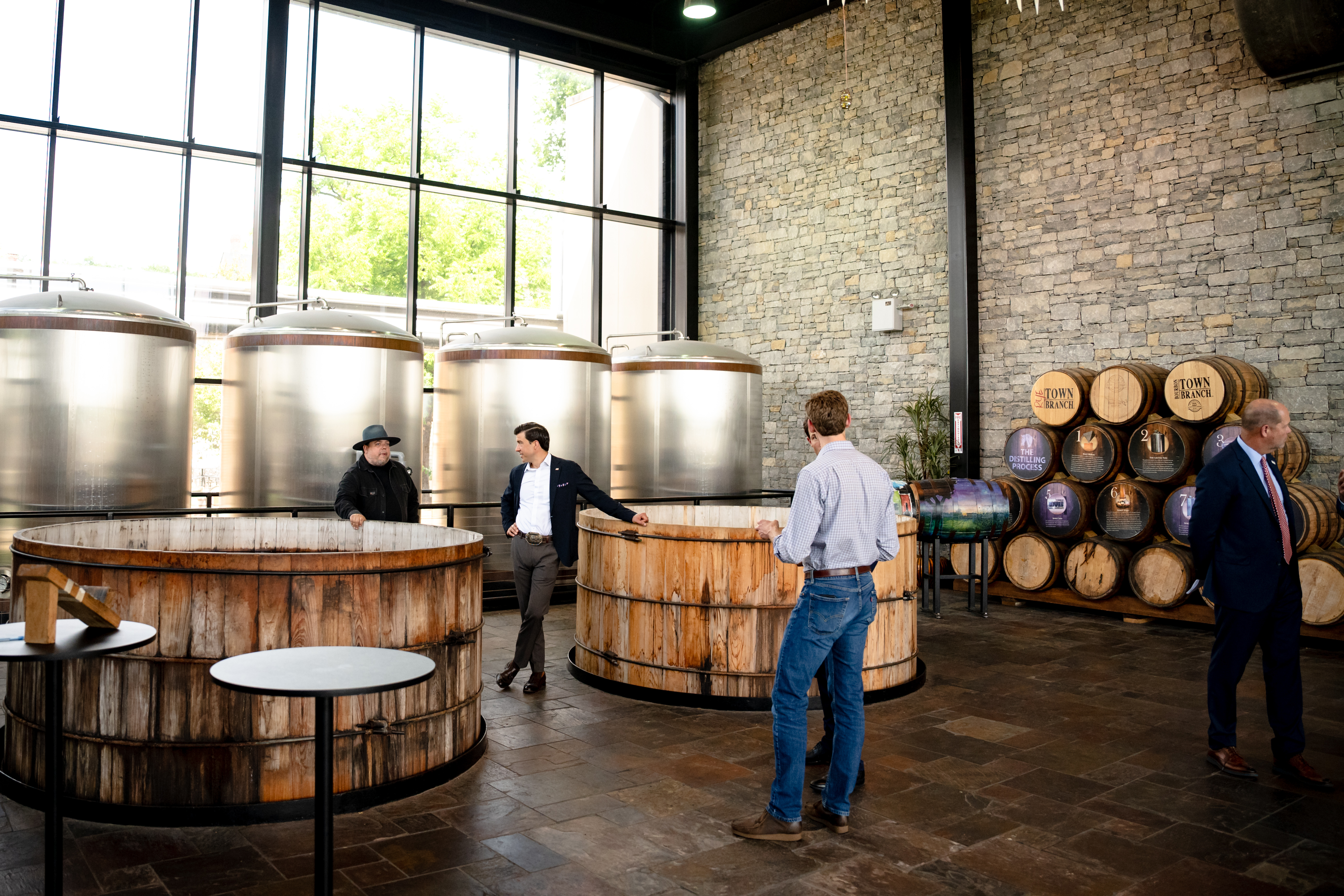
- Type: Bourbon whiskey
- Manufacturer: Alltech's Lexington Brewing and Distilling Company
- Origin: Kentucky, United States
- Introduced: 2012
- Alcohol by volume: 40.00%
- Proof (US): 80
- Website: http://www.kentuckyale.com/town-branch

Town Branch is a Kentucky straight bourbon whiskey brand produced by the Lexington Brewing and Distilling Company of Lexington, Kentucky which is owned by Alltech. Town Branch Distillery is the first distillery to be built in Lexington in more than 100 years.

The name "Town Branch" commemorates the body of water that presently runs under Lexington, on which Lexington was founded. The water is important for the distillery because Lexington is a part of the Bluegrass region with limestone-rich land that filters out iron and adds calcium.

The distillery houses production for Alltech's four spirits: Town Branch Bourbon, Pearse Lyons Reserve (a single malt whiskey), Town Branch Rye Whiskey, and Bluegrass Sundown (a bourbon-infused coffee drink). Town Branch Distillery was accepted as part of the Kentucky Bourbon Trail in 2012.

== History ==
The Lexington Brewing Company was acquired by Pearse Lyons and Alltech in 1999. The first brand was Limestone Brewing, which was shortly changed to Kentucky Ale. The Lexington Brewing Company brewed Kentucky Ale (and after 2005) Kentucky Bourbon Barrel Ale for 7 years before beginning to distill spirits. In 2008, two copper pot stills from Scotland were used to distill the first batches of whiskeys in their original brewery. The company name was changed to include "distilling" and Town Branch was branded. After four years of aging, the company began bottling and selling by October 2012. In February 2015, the Town Branch Single Barrel was released. The inaugural Town Branch Single Barrel collection will be bottled as non-chill filtered and at cask strength. Six, six-year-old barrels were selected for bottling and are only for retail at the Alltech Lexington Brewing and Distilling Co.

== Production process ==
Town Branch Bourbon uses a mashbill of 72 percent corn, 15 percent malted rye, and 13 percent malted barley. The mash is fermented in large cypress wood fermenting containers in Town Branch Distillery's glass, front room. Town Branch distills in two large, copper pot stills imported from Scotland. The raw whiskey is aged in oak barrels, charred on the inside to char level 5.
