= Kilkenny (beer) =

Irish cream ale

Kilkenny Irish Cream Ale
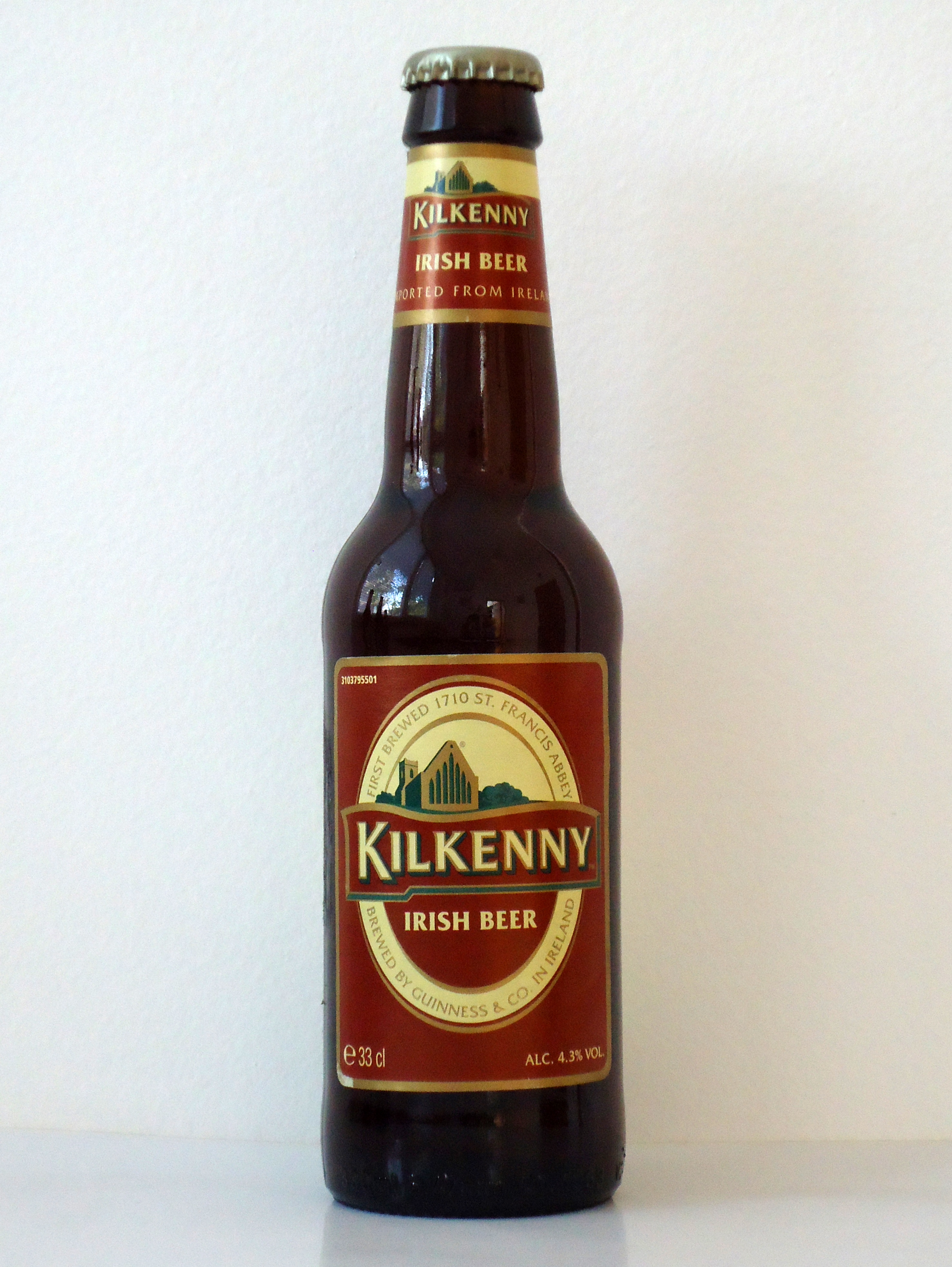
- Kilkenny Irish beer
- Manufacturer: St. Francis Abbey
- Introduced: 1987
- Alcohol by volume: 4.3%
- Style: Irish Red Ale
- IBU scale: 29
- Website: www.diageo.com/en/our-brands/brand-explorer

Kilkenny is a nitrogenated Irish cream ale from Guinness, which originated in Kilkenny, Ireland. The brand is produced and managed by Guinness owner Diageo. Kilkenny is available in draught, bottles and cans. Kilkenny is similar to Smithwick's Draught; however, it has less hop finish, and it has a nitrogenated cream head similar to Guinness. The Kilkenny name was originally used during the 1980s and 1990s to market a stronger version of Smithwick's for the European and Canadian markets due to difficulty in pronunciation of the word Smithwick's. It now refers to a similar yet distinct beer.

Kilkenny was brewed in St. Francis Abbey Brewery in Kilkenny, which was the oldest operating brewery in Ireland until its closure in 2013. It is now brewed at Guinness brewery, Dublin, and served in similar manner to Guinness; fully risen with a head of about 19 to 25 millimetres (0.75 to 1 in). The ingredients are water, malted barley, roasted malted barley, hops, and yeast.

While Ireland is the primary market for the brand, Australia and Canada are the two largest importers of Kilkenny.

== Export ==
=== Australia and New Zealand ===
Kilkenny is available on tap in a number of Australian and New Zealand bars and pubs, where it is served, as with locally brewed draught Guinness, on a mixture of 70% nitrogen and 30% carbon dioxide through a special tap to render a creamy head. The Kilkenny available in 470 ml (16 US fl oz) cans in Australia from some bottle stores is brewed in Australia under license by Lion and uses a different formula to the Irish version. It is often labelled Kilkenny Red. The Irish version is sometimes available imported in 440 ml (15 US fl oz) cans.

=== Canada ===
Kilkenny is also available in Canada, including in Montreal's Irish pubs, and the LCBO also saw an increase in sales after July 2013. Kilkenny grew in popularity after several Canadian personalities, including Mike Myers and Drake, were pictured with a Kilkenny "in hand".

== See also ==
- Beer in Ireland
- Beer in Australia
- Beer in Canada
