= Lexington Brewing and Distilling Company =

- Industry: Alcoholic beverage
- Founded: 1999; 27 years ago
- Founder: Pearse Lyons
- Headquarters: Lexington, Kentucky, U.S.
- Products: Beer, spirits
- Production output: 30,000 US beer barrels (3,500,000 L; 930,000 US gal; 770,000 imp gal)
- Owner: Alltech
- Website: http://www.kentuckyale.com/

Lexington Brewing and Distilling Company is a brewery and distillery based in Lexington, Kentucky founded in 1999 by Pearse Lyons, the president and founder of animal nutrition company Alltech.

Alltech entered the beverage industry with the introduction of their Kentucky Ale. In 2012 the company opened its distillery and developed a line of spirits including Pearse Lyons Reserve, a malt whiskey, Bluegrass Sundown, a bourbon-infused coffee drink, and Town Branch Bourbon.

== Beers ==
Name	Release Date	Availability	Style	ABV%
Kentucky Ale	2000	Year Round	English pale ale	6.0
Kentucky Kolsch	2003	Year Round	Kölsch	4.34
Kentucky Bourbon Barrel Ale	2006	Year Round	Strong ale (barrel aged)	8.2
Kentucky Bourbon Barrel Stout	2012	Year Round	Coffee stout (barrel aged)	8.0
Kentucky Race Day IPA	2013	Limited Release	American Session IPA	4.5
Kentucky White Ale	2015	Limited Release	Witbier	5.3
Kentucky Blue Ale	2015	Limited Release	Witbier/Fruit Beer	5.3
Kentucky IPA	2013	Year Round	American IPA	6.5
Kentucky Vanilla Barrel Cream Ale	2017	Year Round	Cream Ale	5.5
Kentucky Tangerine Cream Ale	2022	Year Round	Cream Ale	5.5
Kentucky Pumpkin Barrel Ale	2013	Seasonal	Pumpkin ale (barrel aged)	10.0
Kentucky Bourbon Barrel Barley Wine	2014	Seasonal	Barley wine (barrel aged)	10.0
Kentucky Peach Barrel Wheat	2014	Seasonal	Fruit (barrel aged)	8.0
Kentucky Honey Barrel Brown Ale	2014	Seasonal	Brown ale (barrel aged)	10.0
Kentucky Rye Barrel IPA	2015	Seasonal	Rye IPA (barrel aged)	10.0

== Spirits ==
The Lexington Brewing and Distilling Company also produces four whiskey spirits:

- Town Branch Bourbon - aged in new, charred white oak barrels - 90 proof
- Town Branch Rye - 100 proof
- Pearse Lyons Reserve (malt whiskey) - aged in spent bourbon barrels that have also been used to age the brewery's flagship Kentucky Bourbon Barrel Ale - 80 proof
- Bluegrass Sundown - a dark roasted coffee infused with Kentucky bourbon and sugar

The distillery began making spirits in 2007, and began selling them in 2011 after waiting for four years of aging.

In 2015, the distillery released its first specialty spirit, a 6-year single barrel version of its Town Branch Bourbon.

== Tours ==
With its inception, the Town Branch Distillery was added to the Kentucky Bourbon Trail and began offering tours. Visitors are able to view the alcohol production process and sample beer and spirits.
