= Ridley Inc. =

- Company type: Subsidiary
- Industry: Farm Products
- Headquarters: Mankato, Minnesota, United States
- Area served: United States
- Key people: Steven J. VanRoekel, President & CEO
- Products: Commercial livestock and poultry feeds, supplements, premixes and feed ingredients.
- Revenue: US$574.8 million
- Operating income: US$30.2 million
- Net income: US$19.2 million
- Total assets: US$205.4 million
- Total equity: US$120.9 million
- Number of employees: 700
- Parent: Alltech
- Divisions: U.S. Feed Operations; Ridley Block Operations; Ridley Feed Ingredients
- Subsidiaries: Hubbard Feeds Inc.
- Website: www.ridleyinc.com

Ridley Inc. is an American-based company that manufactures and markets a broad range of complete feed rations, nutritional supplements, feeding blocks and vitamin/mineral premixes directly to livestock producers and through dealer organizations from 29 production plants in the United States. The company has corporate offices in Mankato, Minnesota, United States. It has a Canadian registered office in Winnipeg, Manitoba.

Ridley Inc. was formed in 1994 as a subsidiary of Ridley Corporation Limited of Australia on its acquisition of Winnipeg-based Feed-Rite Mills, a livestock and poultry feed manufacturer with operations in Manitoba, Saskatchewan, Alberta and Ontario. Since 1994, Ridley has grown through the acquisition of other animal nutrition businesses in Canada and the United States, including Zip Feeds in 1996, Hubbard Feeds in 1997, Wayne Feeds in 2000, Sweetlix in 2004, McCauley Bros. in 2006, 4 Seasons Marketing in 2008 and Stockade Brands in 2012. In 2012, Ridley Inc. and London, Ontario-based Masterfeeds Inc. merged their Canadian operations, forming Masterfeeds LP. The new entity was jointly owned by Ridley and Masterfeeds Inc. until both companies were acquired by Alltech.

Ridley Inc. became a publicly traded company in 1997 and is listed on the Toronto Stock Exchange under the symbol RCL.

Ridley employs more than 700 people and manages 29 production operations in the United States. Ridley operates under the trade names of Hubbard Feeds, Ridley Feed Ingredients and Ridley Block Operations. Ridley's revenues in the 12 months ended June 30, 2013 were US$574.8 million.

Fairfax Financial Holdings Limited was the majority shareholder in Ridley Inc until 2015, at which time the Ridley was acquired by Alltech, based in Kentucky.

== See also ==
- Alltech
