= St. Francis Abbey =

Franciscan abbey in Kilkenny, Ireland

- Mainistir Phroinsias
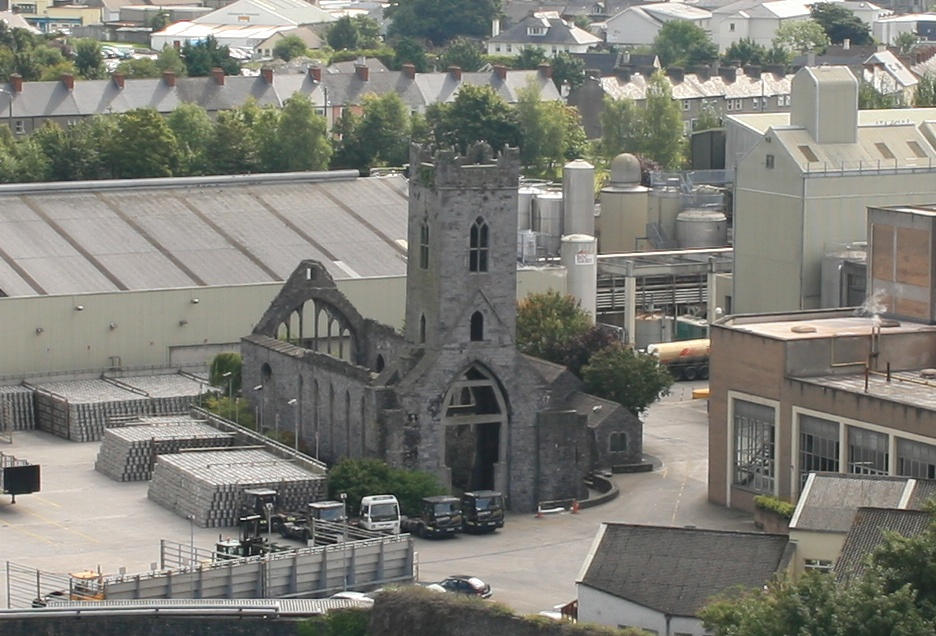

- Location within Ireland

Monastery information
- Other names: The Abbey Church of Saint Francis, Kilkenny; Grey Friary
- Order: Order of Friars Minor (Franciscans)
- Established: 1231–34
- Disestablished: 1829
- Diocese: Ossory

People
- Founder: Richard Marshal, 3rd Earl of Pembroke

Architecture
- Status: Inactive
- Style: Gothic

Site
- Location: Parliament Street, Kilkenny, County Kilkenny
- Coordinates: 52.655926°N 7.253431°W
- Public access: no

St. Francis Abbey, also called Kilkenny Grey Friary, is a medieval Franciscan abbey and National Monument located in Kilkenny City, Ireland.

== Location ==
St. Francis Abbey is located in the northeast of Kilkenny's historic Hightown district, behind the old Smithwick's brewery site, immediately south of the point where the Breagagh River enters the Nore.

== History ==
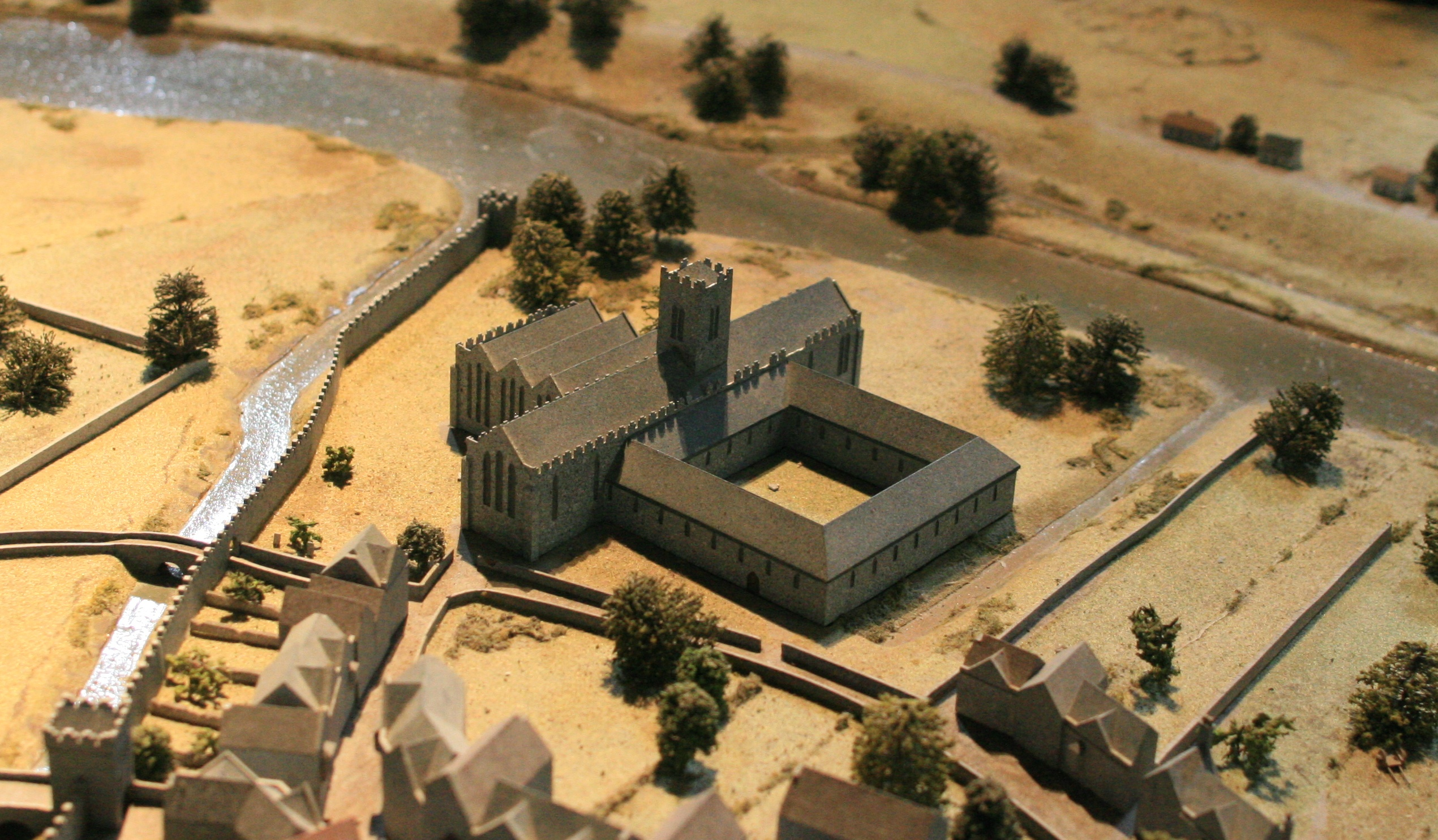
Model of the friary as it would have looked c. 1500

The Order of Friars Minor was founded by Francis of Assisi in 1209; they came to Ireland around 1226, and St Francis Abbey was founded in Kilkenny as a small rectangular chapel between 1231 and April 1234 by Richard Marshal, 3rd Earl of Pembroke. In 1245, it received a royal grant for clothing. It expanded, reaching out to the banks of the Nore and holding provincial chapters of the Franciscans in 1267 and 1308.

During the Dissolution of the monasteries the abbey was granted to Walter Archer. In 1550, the friars were expelled by John Bale, Bishop of Ossory under King Edward VI. When Mary I became Queen in 1553 they returned, only to be expelled again when her half-sister Elizabeth I gained the throne in 1559.

When James I became King, worship returned to the abbey. In 1606, a chalice was presented to St. Francis Abbey by the Archer family. It continued to be repaired and restored, but numbers dwindled over the centuries. In 1766, there were only two friars left, with a few others working as parish clergy. The last friar died in 1829.

The monks had been brewing ale since the 14th century, and a commercial brewery — Smithwick's — was established to brew Irish red ale in 1710. During the expansion of Smithwick's Brewery in 1854, the nave and chancel of the abbey were discovered within the grounds of the brewery. The sacristy has been restored as an oratory at the brewery.

== Buildings ==
The remains of St. Francis Abbey include the great east window: a cluster of seven lancet lights divided by slender mullions. The nave, chancel, bell tower and sacristy also survive, as does a holy well bearing St. Francis's name.
