= Pearse Lyons =

Irish businessman

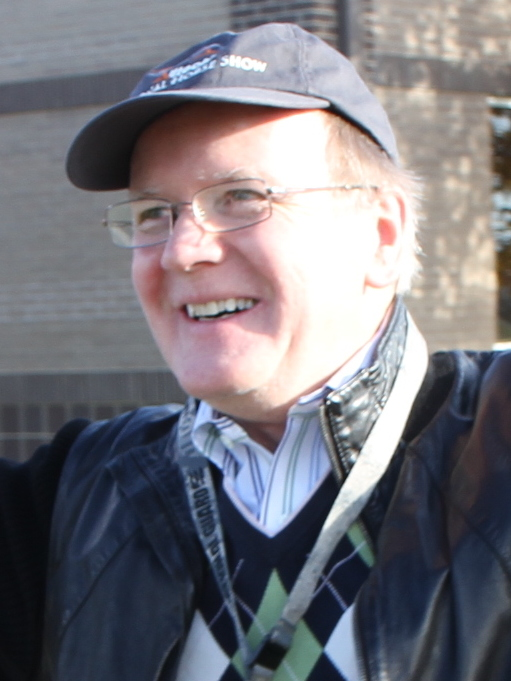
Lyons in 2012

Thomas Pearse Lyons (3 August 1944 – 8 March 2018) was an Irish businessman and the founder and President of Kentucky-based Alltech Inc., an American animal health and nutrition company that is centred on innovation, research and development. Lyons was considered an "entrepreneur, salesman, marketer and scientist all rolled into one", and was widely regarded in the agribusiness sector as an innovator and industry leader.

== Early life and education ==
Lyons was born and raised in Dundalk, County Louth. He graduated from University College Dublin (UCD) with a first class honours degree in biochemistry. He worked in Harp Lager in Dundalk while at college. Lyons also graduated with a Master of Science in Brewing Science from the British School of Malting and Brewing (now the School of Biochemistry), University of Birmingham in 1968. In 1971 Lyons received a PhD Biochemistry, also from the University of Birmingham. He later started an MBA at UCD, but didn't complete it. He moved to Irish Distillers, which he described as his 'dream job'.

Lyons received an Honorary Doctorate from Heriot-Watt University in 2004.

== Alltech ==
In October 1980, Lyons set up Alltech in his garage, with an initial investment of $10,000. Lyons used his fermentation expertise to continue helping brewers, and the business was profitable by Christmas. Within the first year, Alltech did a million dollars' worth of business.

A few years later, Lyons turned his attention to animal feed in the belief that yeasts, enzymes and certain bacteria could help animals use feed more efficiently.

In May 2009, Alltech and the Muhammad Ali Center announced the creation of a joint charitable fund, the Alltech-Muhammad Ali Center Global Education and Charitable Fund.

In 2011, Alltech invested $9.5 million in its Tianjin facility. Alltech was the title sponsor of the 2010 FEI World Equestrian Games held in Lexington, Kentucky. Alltech also committed to sponsor the Alltech FEI World Equestrian Games™ 2014 in Normandy. In 2011, Alltech opened the Alltech Algae facility, located in Winchester, Ky. and the company is pursuing algae's applications in animal and human nutrition.

In 2012, Alltech was named to a top-10 Best Companies Supporting the Arts in America by the Americans for the Arts. The company received the award for its support of the local arts, its statewide music festival – the Alltech Fortnight Festival – in conjunction with the Games, its annual Alltech Vocal Scholarship Competition and its incorporation of the arts into its Sustainable Haiti Project.

Lyons also established Alltech's Lexington Brewing and Distilling Company, which includes a line of beers and spirits. In 2012, Alltech partnered with Ireland's Carlow Brewing Company to begin distilling its first genuine Irish whiskey.

=== Pearse Lyons Distillery ===
The Pearse Lyons Distillery opened in St James' Church on Dublin's James's Street in September 2017.

== Personal life ==
Lyons met Deirdre Byrne when he was 17 and they were married in 1972. They had a daughter, Aoife, in 1973 and a son, Mark, in 1977.

In 2012, Lyons’ wealth was estimated to be in the region of €1.5bn and according to the Sunday Times Rich List he was the sixth richest Irish person.

Lyons authored more than 20 books and many research papers for scientific journals.

Lyons was named Business Person of the Year in 2012 by Business and Finance in Ireland. Also in 2012, Lyons received the Ireland-US Council's Award for Outstanding Achievement for strengthening economic ties between the United States and Ireland.

Lyons died on March 8, 2018, after which his son Mark took on the roles of President and chairman at Alltech. His daughter Aoife Lyons, Alltech's director of educational initiatives and engagement, died on April 18, 2019.

== Further information ==
- Alltech
- Pearse Lyons – Alltech Symposium 2010 on YouTube
