= Franciscan Well =

Cork pub and brewery

Franciscan Well Brewery and Brew Pub
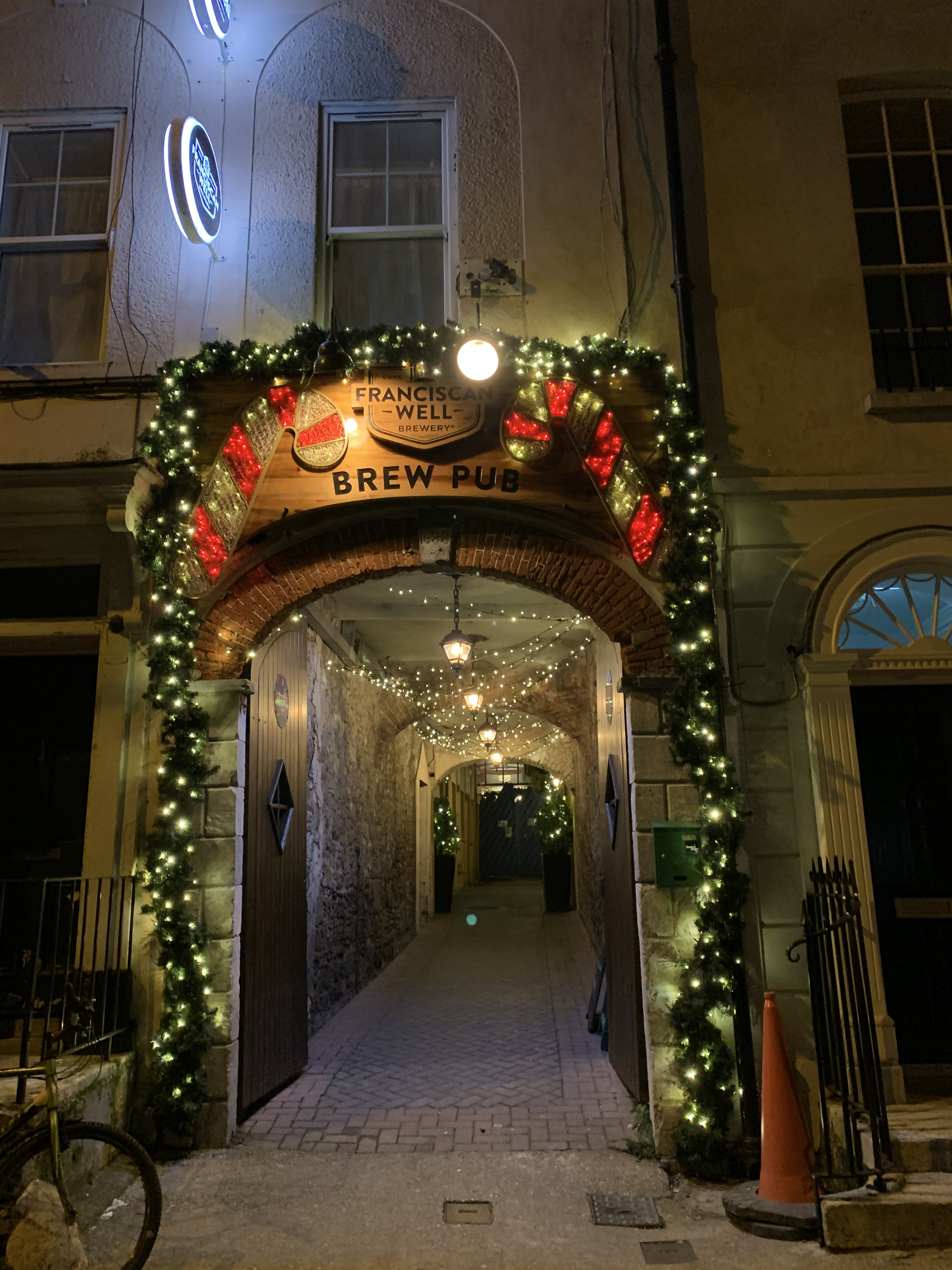
- Entrance to the brewery and pub
- Interactive map of Franciscan Well Brewery and Brew Pub
- Location: Cork, County Cork, Ireland
- Coordinates: 51°54′04″N 8°28′56″W
- Opened: 1998
- Key people: Shane Long, Michael Sheehan
- Owned by: Shane Long
- Website: www.franciscanwellbrewery.com

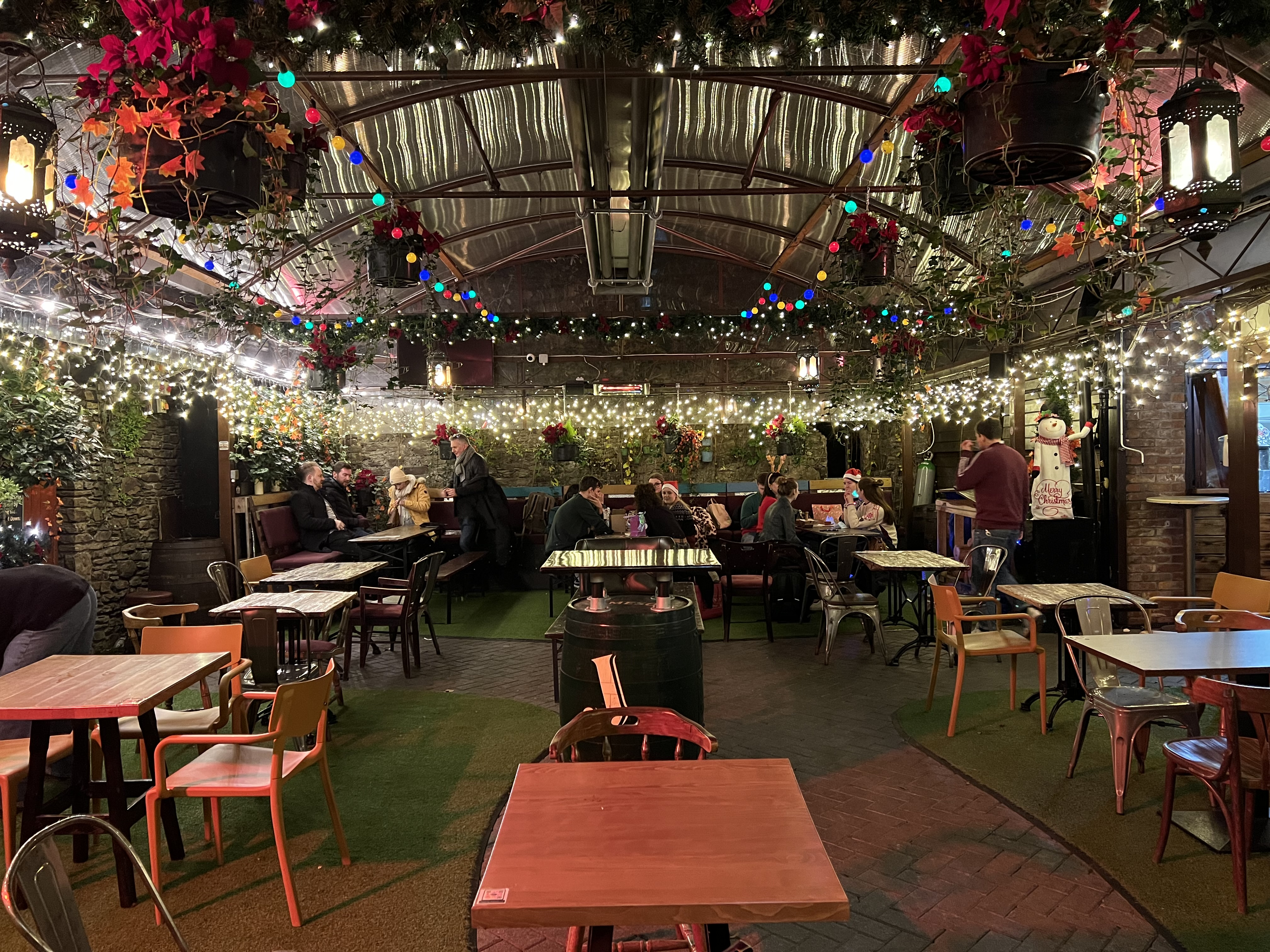
Beer garden in Franciscan Well with old monastery walls visible

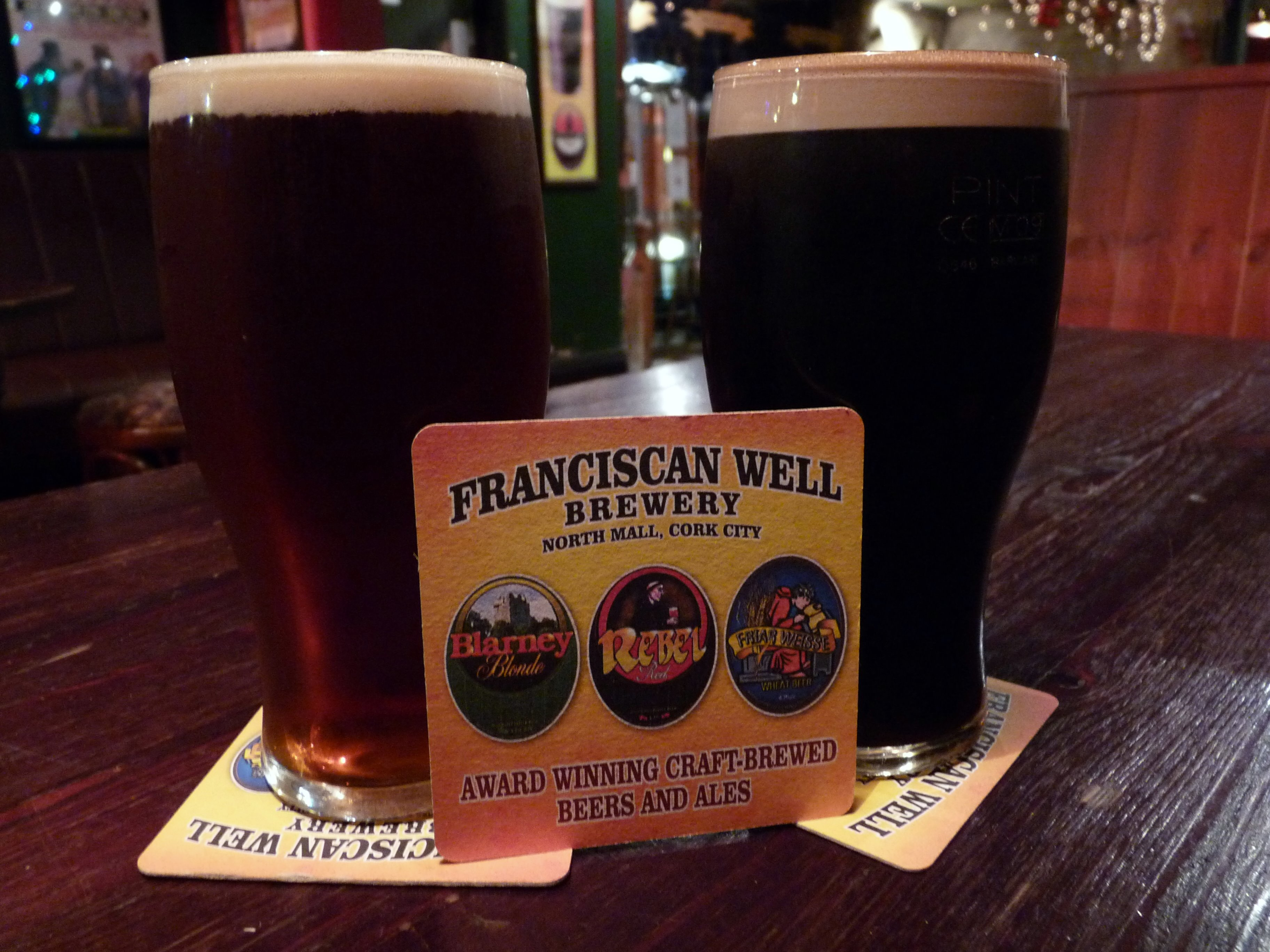
Beers sold at Franciscan Well

The Franciscan Well, founded in 1998, is a craft brewery and pub located in Cork, Ireland.

The brewery and pub are located on the north bank of the River Lee, on the site of an old Franciscan monastery from 1219, and the monastery walls (including the eponymous well) now surround the beer garden adjacent to the pub, where contemporary fermentation vessels are also visible. During the 1940s the area was used to bottle Guinness beer, manufactured in Dublin, for Cork customers.

While the Franciscan Well beer brand was acquired by Molson Coors in 2013, the pub and brewery are still in the hands of the original owners. Beer brands originated in Franciscan Well include Chieftain IPA, Rebel Red, Shandon Stout (created in partnership with Jameson distillers), Well Hazy, Archway Lager, and Friar Weisse. In 2016, the packaging was rebranded from the original image of a monk, and several of these brands were selected for nationwide and overseas distribution in 330ml cans.

By 2018, two decades since the brewery had been established, the annual production reached 90,000 kegs, and the brewery had become a well-established brand in Cork and Ireland.

The bar resumed brewing in 2022 under a different name Original7 . The bar has always remained in the ownership of Shane Long and now the brewery is independent once again .

Many brewing collaborations have been done since with the likes of Jameson and famed Cork soft drinks producer Tanora
