= Smithwick's Experience Kilkenny =

Coordinates: 52.6539°N 7.2542°W

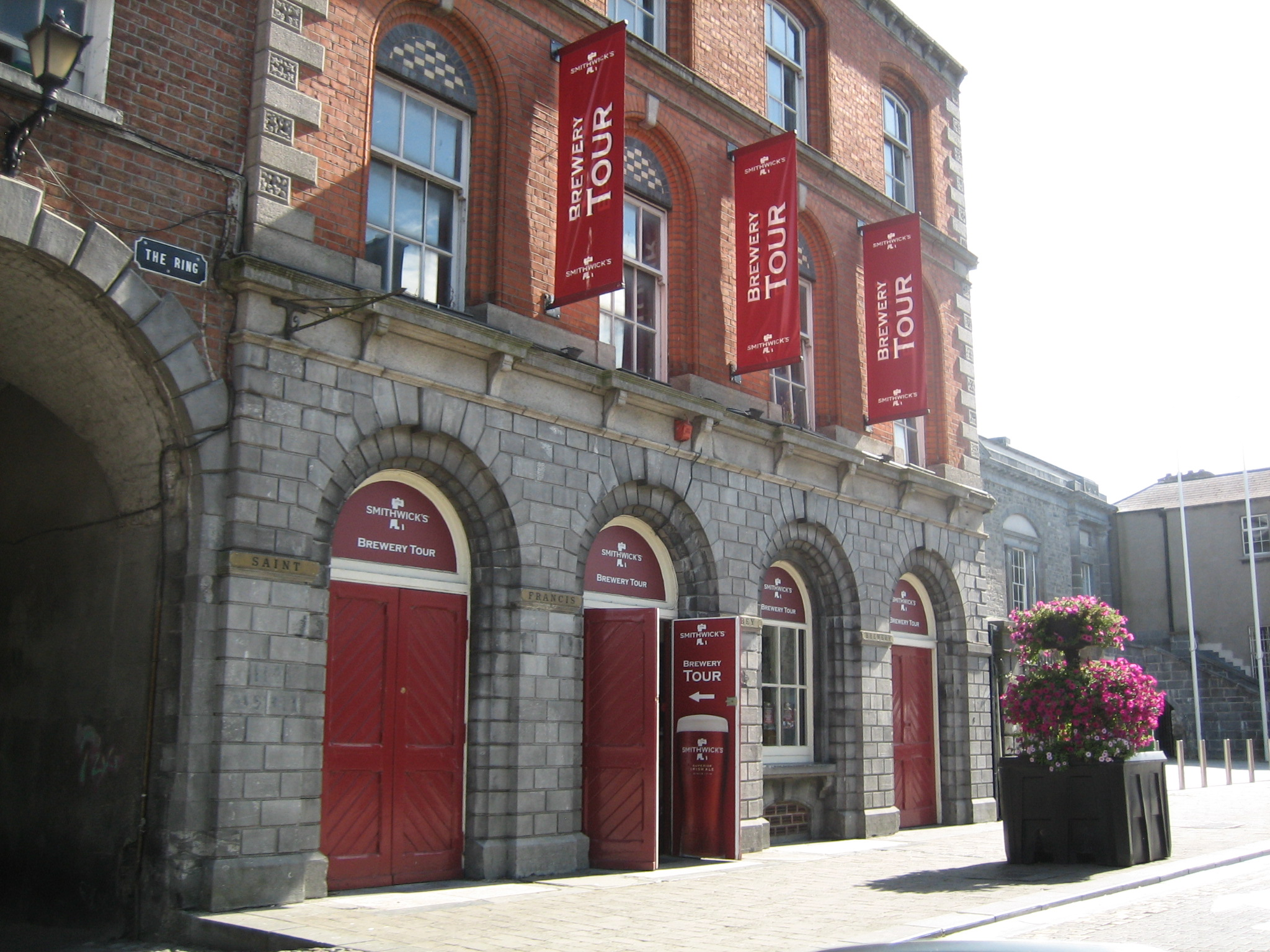
- The Exterior of the Smithwick's Experience
- Established: Original brewery: 1706; Later brewery tour: 2014
- Location: Parliament St, Kilkenny, Ireland

Smithwick's Experience Kilkenny (formerly St. Francis Abbey Brewery and Kilkenny Brewery) is a brewery-turned-brewery-tour located on the "medieval mile" in Kilkenny, Ireland.

The Smithwick's Experience Kilkenny is the site where Smithwick's was brewed from the 1700s until 2014. Prior to this, the site was owned by Franciscan friars who also brewed beer before they were dissolved during the Reformation in 1537. The site is a visitor centre and brewery tour that covered the location's history, the brand evolution, a bar and tastings, visual effects including holograms, and a gift shop.

== History ==
The brewery site was originally a Franciscan monastery called St. Francis Abbey. During the expansion of Smithwicks Brewery in 1854, the nave and chancel of the abbey were discovered within the grounds of the brewery. The sacristy was later restored as an oratory at the brewery. The well was dedicated to St Francis and is located about 45 metres to the northeast of the friary and is now underneath one of the brewery buildings. The Abbey and brewery closed after 300 years due to the Reformation in Ireland in 1537. Many years later in 1705, the land was leased to John Smithwick and Richard Cole, who started a brewing business. The land at that time was owned by the Duke of Ormond. In 1710, John Smithwick became the owner, but this was not publicly known because according to the penal laws, as a Catholic, Smithwick was not allowed to own property. Penal laws were revoked in 1782, allowing the Smithwick family to publicly claim ownership.

Many years later, John Smithwick's grandson Edmond Smithwick took over the business. The brewery stayed wholly within the Smithwicks family until 1964, when Guinness and Company (Diageo) bought a controlling share of the brewery.

The site operated as a brewery until December 2013, when all brewing was moved to St James's Gate in Dublin. After Diageo moved brewing operations out of Kilkenny, the site was re-opened in 2014 as a visitor center that focused on the history of the brewery and the brewing process.

The visitor centre closed in 2020 due to COVID-19 restrictions, and it was announced that it was to close permanently in April 2021. It re-opened in July 2022.
