= Wilderness Trail Distillery =

Coordinates: 37.621°N 84.826°W

- Company type: distillery
- Founded: 2013
- Headquarters: Danville, Kentucky
- Website: wildernesstraildistillery.com

Wilderness Trail Distillery is a distillery in Danville, Kentucky that started operation in 2013 by Dr. Pat Heist and Shane Baker. After spending over 10 years as consultants and providing yeast and optimization services to most of the industry, Wilderness Trail has three whiskies on the market: a Single Barrel bottled in Bond, Kentucky; Straight Bourbon made with small grain wheat; another bourbon bottled in Bond; Straight Bourbon small batch of 12 barrels made with rye small grain; and a Kentucky straight Rye Whiskey single barrel cask strength. All are high quality and aged from 5 to 7 years. Wilderness calls itself the city's "oldest legal distillery". Wilderness restored the Willis Grimes House, an 1869 historic Home used for their offices, and moved its main distilling and warehousing operations there in 2015. Their campus rests on 163 acres in Boyle County.

In October 2022 Campari acquired a 70% stake of the company for $420 million.

== Honors and awards ==
- Kentucky Manufacturing Award
- Forbes Magazine top 15 American Whiskeys, San Francisco World Spirits Competition - Gold Medal for Blue Heron vodka and Bronze Medal for Harvest rum
