= Barrel House Distillery =

Small batch distillery in Lexington, Kentucky

Coordinates: 38.0564°N 84.5191°W

Barrel House Distillery is a small batch distillery located in Lexington, Kentucky, formed in 2008. The distillery produces RockCastle Bourbon, Oak Rum, Pure Blue Vodka and Devil John Dark (aged) Moonshine. Products from the distillery are now available for purchase at Spirit Hub. Their Rock Castle Bourbon is award-winning of the Heartland Spirits Fest.

== History ==
The distillery was founded by longtime friends Jeff Wiseman and Peter Wright in 2008 when they released their Pure Blue Vodka. They started work on the distillery in 2006. The distillery can be located at the site of the barreling house of the Old Oscar Pepper distillery, 1200 Manchester Street Lexington, Kentucky 40504. The original distilling company that owned the barreling house eventually become part of the Sazerac Company.
