= MB Roland Distillery =

Distillery in Kentucky

Coordinates: 36.6978°N 87.3919°W

- Company type: Distillery
- Founded: 2009
- Founder: Paul & Merry Beth Tomaszewski
- Headquarters: Pembroke, Kentucky

MB Roland Distillery is a Pembroke, Kentucky based craft distillery, opened in 2009. It is known as Kentucky's first modern completely "grain to glass" craft distillery.

== History ==
The MB Roland Distillery was founded by Paul & Merry Beth ("MB") Tomaszewski in 2009. The site of the distillery sits on a former Amish family farm, which serves as the home for the visitor center, rickhouse and distillery.

== Spirits ==
The distillery offers 23 different spirits, including moonshine, malt whiskey, corn whiskey, wheat whiskey, rye whiskey, bourbon whiskey, and other flavored moonshines. The final strength of their whiskeys is typically 105-120 proof.
