= Boone County Distilling Co. =

Coordinates: 38°56′48.3″N 84°36′49.4″W

The Boone County Distilling Company is a distillery originally formed in Petersburg, Kentucky, and operated from 1833 until shutting down in 1918. It was later re-established in Independence, Kentucky, in 2015, by owners Jack Wells and Josh Quinn.

The original distillery was a steam mill bought by Virginia brothers John and William Snyder. Shortly after purchase it became the Petersburg Distillery.

== History ==
In 1833 William Snyder and his brother John bought the Petersburg steam mill in Boone County and converted it into the company's original the Petersburg Distillery. The original distillery was plotted on a 1000-acre tract of land. In1860 the Distillery had produced one million gallons of whisky and in 1861 the Col. William Appleton (who is the Snyder's son in law) bought the distillery after the Snyder's brothers assets were seized by the government due to 15 writs of fiera facias issued against William Snyder by as many men asking for repayment of debts ranging from $500 to $6,000, the debt totaling $30,000. Due to the $1.50/gallon liquor tax imposed on distributors during the Civil War, Appleton sold the Distillery to Joseph C. Jenkins and James Gaff.

By 1880, the Petersburg Distillery had become the largest distillery in the state of Kentucky. By 1910 the distillery had been shut down due to lack of visitors to the town Petersburg and the final reserves were sold off by 1918. Most of the Boone County Distillery complex was gone by 1919, tangible remains of the facility endure. The original distillery is an archaeological site with remnants of stone and brick foundations and walls.

The Distillery was re-established in 2015 at a new location in Independence, Kentucky. The current owners are Jack Wells and Josh Quinnin.

Boone County Distilling Co. announced a partnership with NBA player Stephen Curry in May 2023 to distill the athlete's "Gentlemen's Cut" Kentucky bourbon.

== Bourbons ==
Boone County Distilling Co. current have 5 different types of bourbons for sale currently. Their classic Eighteen 33 which is a standard bourbon whisky, White Hall Bourbon Cream (a rich alabaster cream blend with aged bourbon), a 12-year single barrel of their Eighteen 33, and two versions Tanner's Curse whisky, either made from a bourbon mash or a rye mash.

The Eighteen 33 mash bill is 75% corn 21% rye 4% malted barley with an amber color. The mash bill for Tanner's Curse (bourbon mash) is 75% corn 21% rye 4% malted barley with a clear color. Tanner's Curse (rye mash) mash bill is 95% rye 5% malted rye and also has a clear color .

== Awards & ratings ==
=== Tastings.com ===
White Hall Bourbon Cream: Gold medal and a score of 91

Eighteen 33: Gold medal and a score of 93

=== San Francisco world spirits Competition ===
2018 San Francisco World Spirits Competition - 12 year single barrel Eighteen 33: Double gold medal
