= Alltech =

American agricultural products company

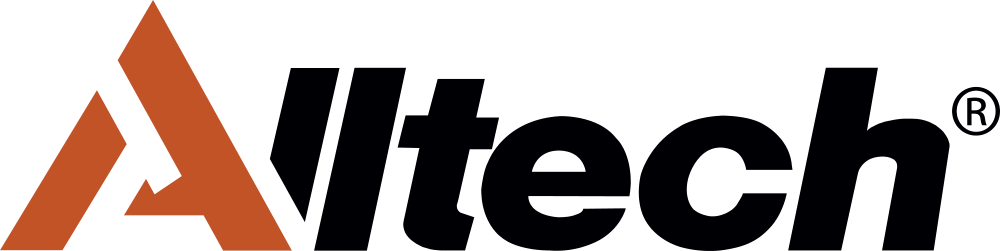

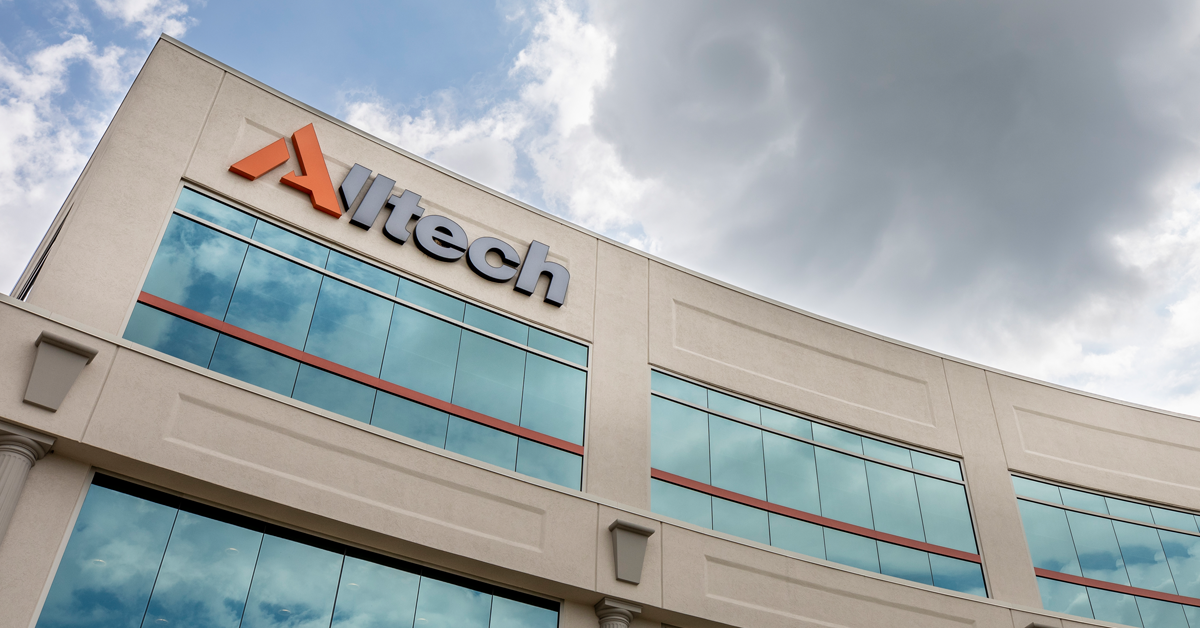
- Company type: Private
- Industry: Animal health and nutrition, crop science, beverages
- Founded: 1980
- Founder: Pearse Lyons
- Headquarters: Nicholasville, Kentucky, United States
- Key people: Pearse Lyons, Founder; Deirdre Lyons, Co-Founder; Dr. Mark Lyons, President & CEO
- Number of employees: 6,000
- Subsidiaries: Lexington Brewing and Distilling Company; Masterfeeds LP; Ridley Inc.
- Website: https://www.alltech.com

Alltech is an American company, headquartered in Nicholasville, Kentucky, with operations in animal feed, meat, brewing, and distilling. Alltech develops agricultural products for use in both livestock and crop farming, as well as products for the food industry. Alltech operates under three main divisions: animal nutrition and health; crop science; and, food and beverage.

== Company history ==
Alltech was founded by biochemist Pearse Lyons in 1980 in Lexington, Kentucky. Lyons was born in Dundalk, Ireland and was educated in University College Dublin and the University of Birmingham, England, where he received a PhD in the biochemistry of yeast. In 1980, he founded Alltech and the company began to supply biotechnology-derived ingredients to the livestock and poultry feed industry. The company opened its first international office, in Ireland, in 1981. In 1994, Alltech opened its first Asia-Pacific office in Beijing, China. Alltech opened a European Bioscience and Marketing Centre facility in Dunboyne, Co. Meath in 2009.

In 2015, Alltech acquired Ridley Inc, an animal nutrition business.

In 2018, Dr. Mark Pearse Lyons became President and CEO of the company after his father, founder Dr. Pearse Lyons, died.

== Lyons Farm ==
The Lyons Farm meat brand was launched in 2012 as a partnership between Alltech and Critchfield Meats.

== Lexington Brewing and Distilling Company ==
In 1999, Lyons reopened the Lexington Brewing Company. In 2011, Lyons launched Town Branch Bourbon, named after the waterway on which Lexington is founded. In 2012, Alltech announced it would establish a whiskey distillery in Bagenalstown, Co. Carlow, Ireland.

== Alltech FEI World Equestrian Games ==
Alltech became the first title sponsor of the 2010 FEI World Equestrian Games, the biggest sport horse event in the world, reputedly at a cost of $32m. The company is also the title sponsor of the 2014 Games, in Normandy, France, during end of August and beginning of September.

== The Pearse Lyons Accelerator ==
Launched in 2016, The Pearse Lyons Accelerator is a startup accelerator that provides a four-month program for late stage agritech startups. In its first 3 years it has accelerated 22 startups, having received 251 applications from 53 countries for its 2019 edition. Alltech runs this accelerator to keep up to date with technologies, motivate Alltech staff, showcase thought leadership and create win-wins for its customers. The accelerator is run by Irish startup hub Dogpatch Labs.
