= Kentucky Peerless Distilling Company =

Kentucky Peerless Distilling Company is a whiskey distillery in Louisville, Kentucky, in the United States.
