= Smithwick's =

Brand of Irish beer

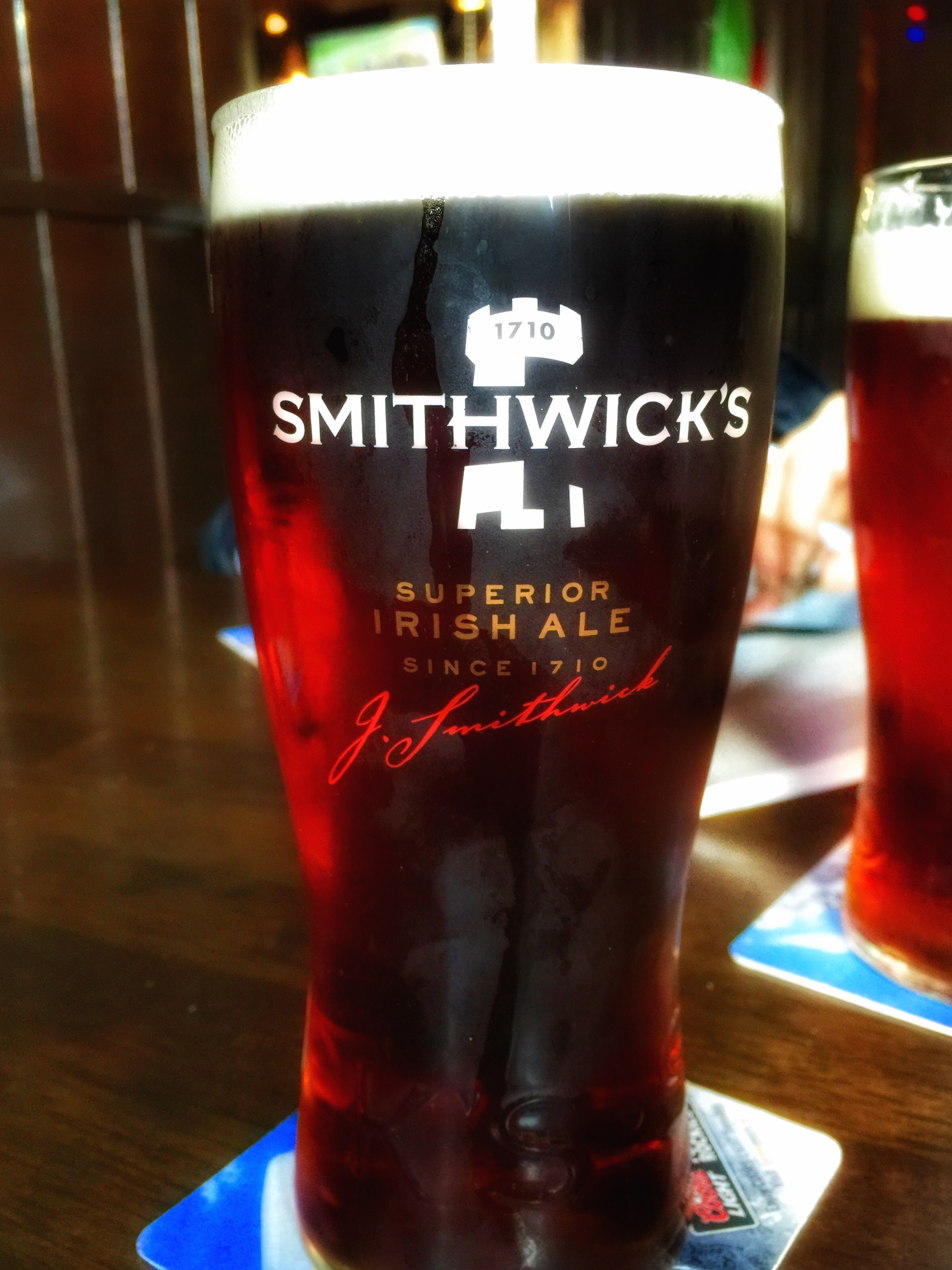
- A pint of Smithwick's
- Type: Irish red ale
- Distributor: Diageo
- Origin: Ireland
- Introduced: 1710; 316 years ago
- Colour: Ruby red
- Flavour: Balanced, malty.
- Variants: Kilkenny Cream Ale, Smithwicks Pale Ale
- Website: smithwicksexperience.com

Smithwick's (/ˈsmɪðɪks/) is an Irish red ale-style beer. Smithwick's brewery was founded in Kilkenny in 1710 by John Smithwick and run by the Smithwick family of Kilkenny until 1965, when it was acquired by Guinness, now part of Diageo. The Kilkenny brewery was shut down in 2013 and production of all Smithwick's and Kilkenny branded beers moved to Dublin; parts of the old brewery were later converted into a "visitor experience".

== History ==
Smithwick's Brewery was founded by John Smithwick in 1710. The brewery is on the site of a Franciscan abbey, where monks had brewed ale since the 14th century, and ruins of the original abbey still remain on its grounds. The old brewery was later renovated to become the "Smithwick's Experience Kilkenny" visitor attraction and centre. At the time of its closure, it was Ireland's oldest operating brewery.

John Smithwick settled in Kilkenny. Shortly after his arrival, Smithwick went into the brewing business with Richard Cole on a piece of land that Cole had leased from the Duke of Ormond in 1705. Five years later, John Smithwick became the owner of the land. The brewery stayed small, servicing a loyal local following while John Smithwick diversified.

Following John Smithwick's death, the brewery temporarily fell out of family hands. John Smithwick's great-grandson Edmond bought the brewery land back freehold and worked to reshape its future. Edmond concentrated on discovering new markets and successfully building export trade. Drinkers in England, Scotland and Wales developed a taste for Smithwick's brews and output increased fivefold.

As a result of substantial contributions made to St Mary's Cathedral, Edmond became great friends with Irish liberal Daniel O'Connell, who later became godfather to one of his sons. Edmond Smithwick became well known and respected by the people of Kilkenny,, who elected him town mayor four times.

In 1800, export sales began to fall, and the brewing industry encountered difficulty. To combat this, the Smithwick family increased production in their maltings, began selling mineral water and delivered butter with the ale from the back of their drays.

By 1900, output was at an all-time low, and the then owner James Smithwick was advised by auditors to shut the doors of the brewery. Instead, James reduced the range of beers they produced and set out to find new markets. He secured military contracts and soon after saw output increase again. James' son, Walter, took control in 1930 and steered the brewery to success through the hardships of both World War II and increasingly challenging weather conditions. By January 1950, Smithwick's was exporting ale to Boston.

Smithwick's was purchased from Walter Smithwick in 1965 by Guinness and is now, along with Guinness, part of Diageo. Together, Guinness & Co. and Smithwick's developed and launched Smithwick's Draught Ale in 1966. By 1979, half a million barrels were sold each year. In 1980, Smithwick's began exporting to France. In 1993, Smithwick's Draught became Canada's leading imported ale. By 2010, Smithwick's continued to be brewed in Dundalk and Kilkenny, with tankers sent to Dublin to be kegged for the on-trade market. Cans and bottles were packaged by IBC in Belfast. Production in the Kilkenny brewery finished on 31 December 2013, and Smithwick's brands are now produced in the Diageo St. James's Gate Brewery in Dublin.

In 2016 Walter Smithwick's son Paul launched Sullivan's Ale with his son Daniel, which has its home in Kilkenny. The original Kilkenny site was sold to Kilkenny County Council, with a small portion of the site dedicated to the opening of a visitor's centre, the "Smithwick's Experience Kilkenny".

== Smithwick Family ==
Smithwick Family

The Smithwick family is one of Ireland’s historic brewing and mercantile families, with a legacy spanning more than 300 years. Established in the early eighteenth century, the family became prominent in Irish brewing, commerce, law and public life, producing several mayors of Kilkenny and distinguished members of the Irish judiciary.

The family’s brewing dynasty dates to 1710 and became one of Ireland’s most recognisable brewing enterprises. During the nineteenth century, Edmond Smithwick, a four-time Mayor of Kilkenny and associate of Daniel O’Connell, played a significant role in the city’s commercial and civic development. The family’s historic residence was Kilcreene Lodge, Kilkenny.

Walter and Eileen Smithwick were the parents of Judge Peter Smithwick, Michael, Anne, Judy, Paul and John.

Judge Peter Smithwick (1937–2022) served as President of the Irish District Court from 1990 to 2005. One of Ireland’s prominent judicial figures, he subsequently chaired the Smithwick Tribunal, investigating alleged Garda collusion in the 1989 murders of two senior Royal Ulster Constabulary officers. He was also active in charitable and heritage organisations, including the Order of Malta.

Paul Smithwick OBE (1946–2022) was an Irish solicitor, businessman and philanthropist, recognised for his contribution to Anglo-Irish relations. He co-founded Bonds of Friendship, an initiative fostering reconciliation between British and Irish security institutions, and was appointed an Officer of the Order of the British Empire in 2017. A hereditary Freeman of Kilkenny and Knight of Malta, he was also a patron of Irish cultural and charitable institutions.

Paul’s son Daniel Smithwick helped revive the historic Sullivan’s brewing enterprise in Kilkenny. His daughter Emma Smithwick is a television producer in London, while his daughter Georgina Smithwick is a technology investor and entrepreneur, recognised by The Sunday Times among Britain’s Top 100 Innovators.

The Smithwick family remains closely associated with Kilkenny’s brewing heritage and its wider contributions to Irish commercial, judicial and civic life.

== Sullivan's Brewery ==
In the Old Kilkenny Review, 1964, Peter Smithwick, K.M., Solicitor, wrote that the tradition in Kilkenny is that Sullivan's Brewery was founded in 1702 by Daniel Sullivan, a Protestant, who bought property in trust for Pierse Bryan of Jenkinstown, a Catholic who was prohibited by the Penal Laws from buying land. The property, on the West side of High Street, "standing backwards in James's Street", is believed to have been the site of Sullivan's Brewery, the forerunner of Smithwicks.

== Brands ==
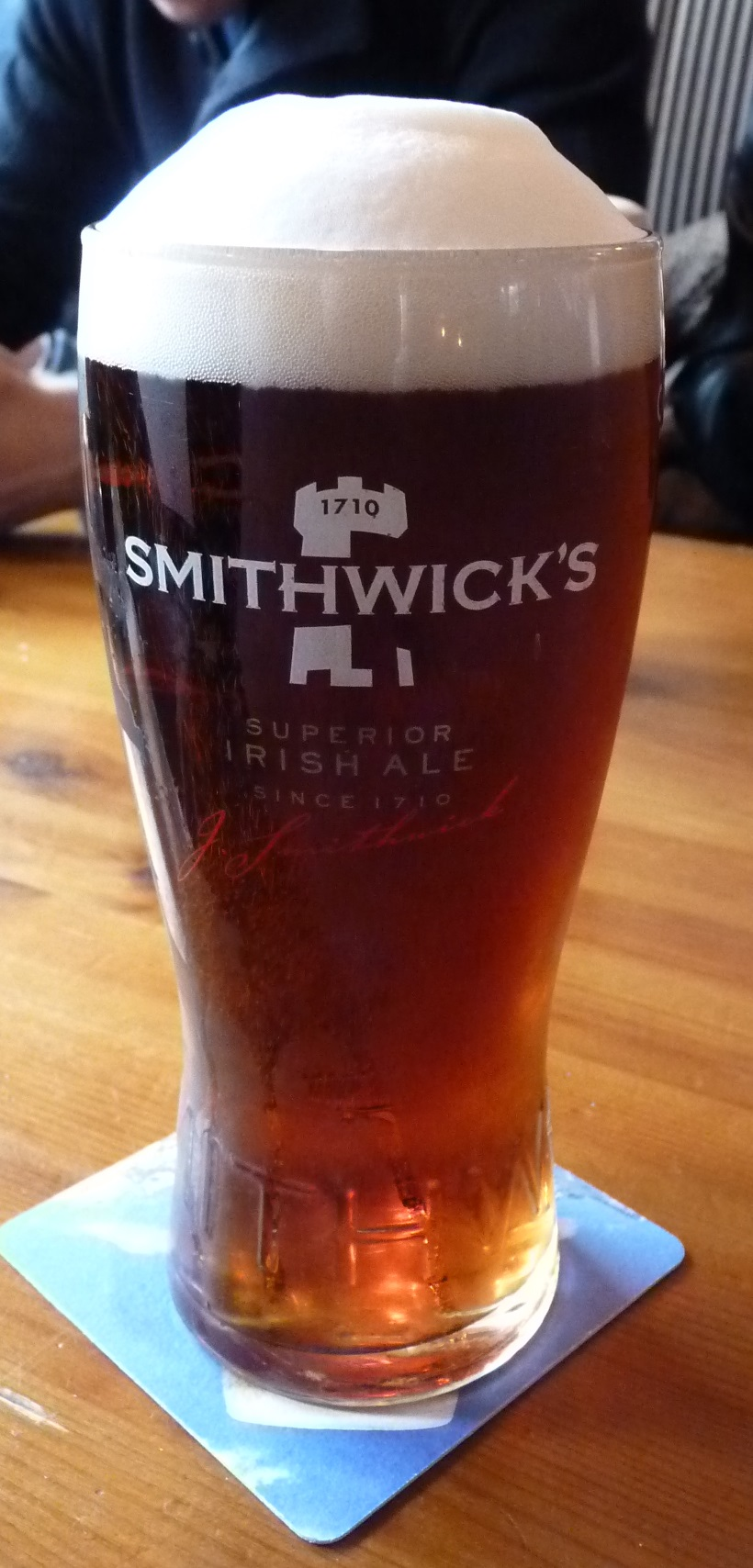
- A pint glass of Smithwick's draught Irish red ale
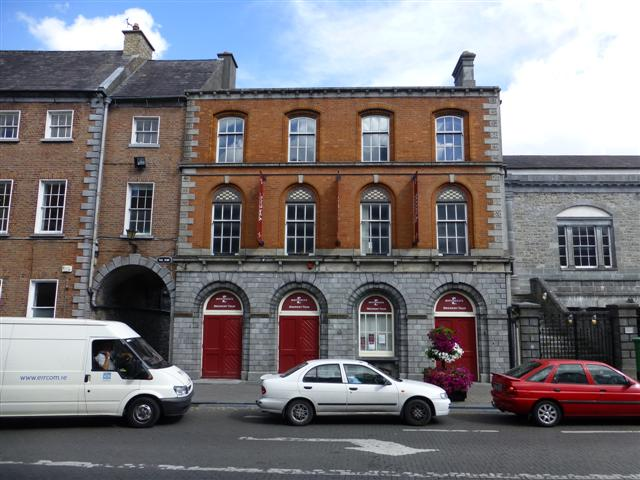
  Smithwick's Brewery, Kilkenny
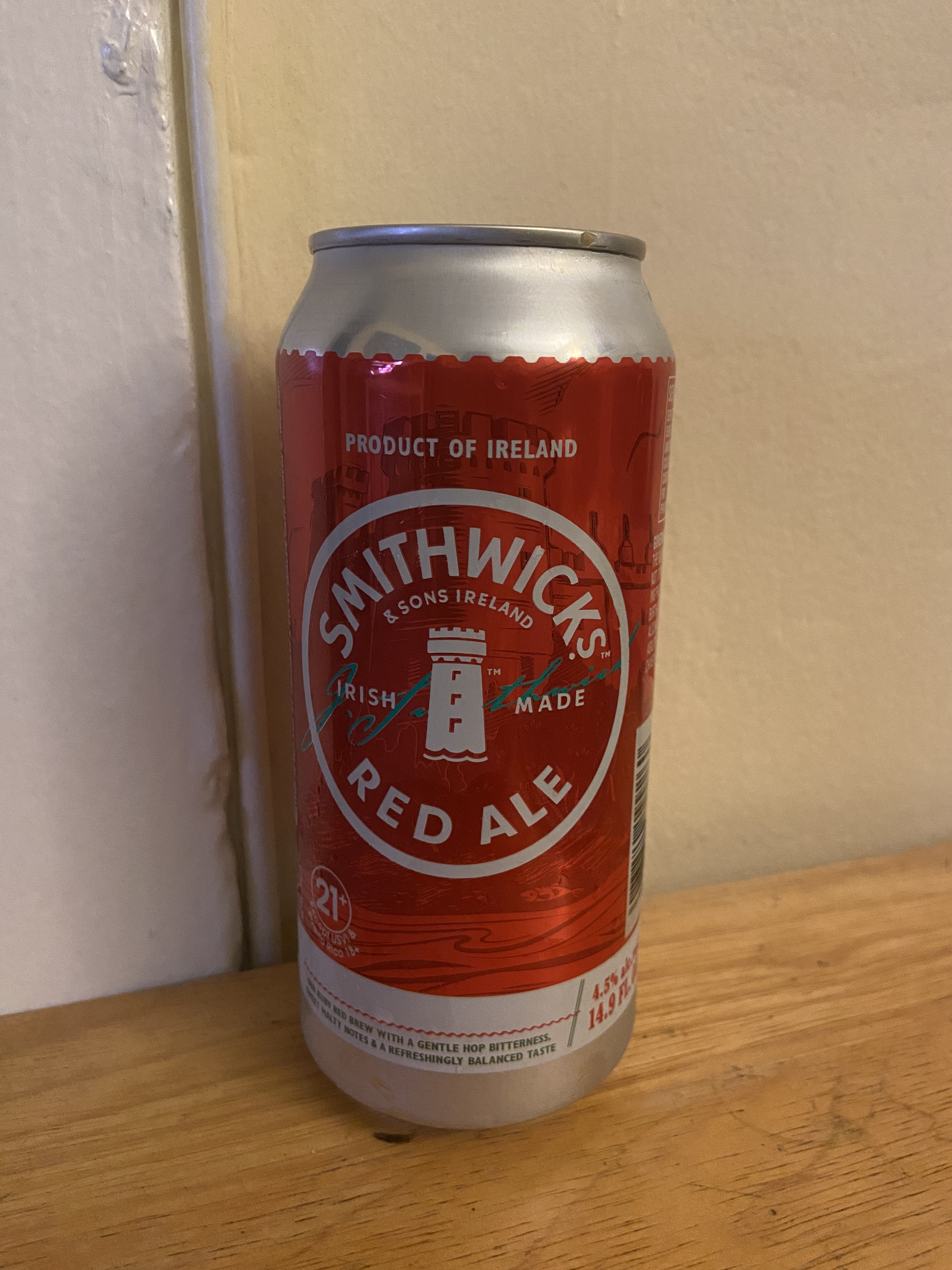
  A can of Smithwick's red ale
  Smithwick's Draught is an Irish red ale and, as the style suggests, has a red tone. It is produced using hops and roasted, malted barley. In 2004, Diageo PLC began distribution in the USA. Smithwick's had previously been marketed in Canada.
- Kilkenny Irish Cream Ale is similar to Smithwick's Draught; however, it has a creamy head similar to Guinness, and it has a stronger and more bitter taste than Smithwick's. The Kilkenny name was originally used during the 1980s and 1990s to market a stronger version of Smithwick's for the European and Canadian market due to local difficulty in pronunciation of the word "Smithwick's", but it now refers to a similar yet distinctly different beer.
- Smithwick's Pale Ale was launched in 2011. The ale is made of pale ale malt, traditional Smithwick's yeast and Amarillo hops and has an ABV of 4.5%.

== See also ==
- Irish beer
