= Galway Hooker (brewery) =

Irish brewery

Galway Hooker Irish Pale Ale
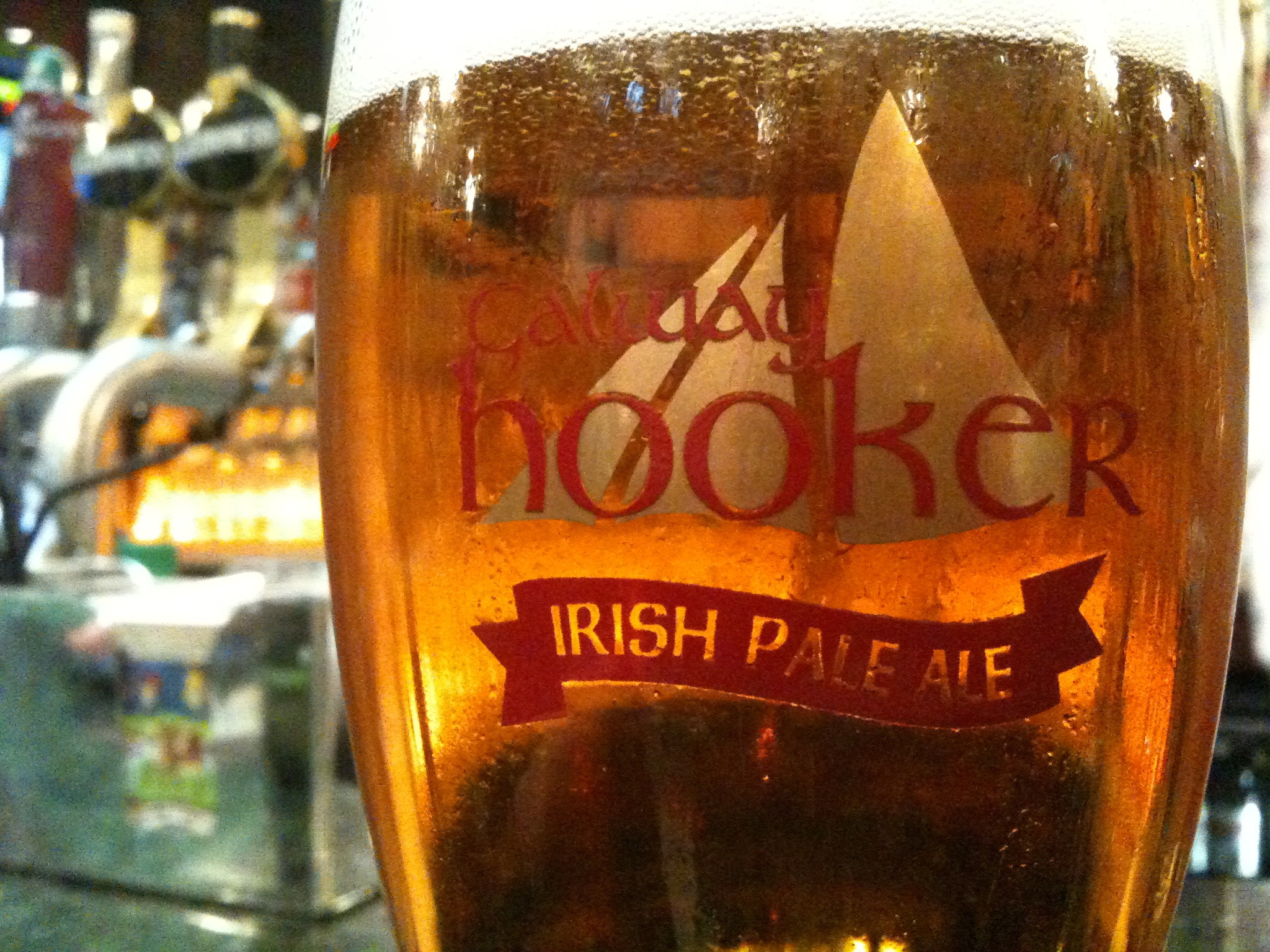
- Glass displaying Galway Hooker logo
- Type: Irish Pale Ale
- Manufacturer: Galway Hooker Brewery
- Origin: Galway, Ireland
- Introduced: 2006
- Alcohol by volume: 4.3
- Ingredients: Pearl and crystal malt, Saaz, cascade hops
- Website: www.galwayhooker.ie

The Galway Hooker Brewery is based in Oranmore, County Galway, Ireland. The brewery was founded in 2006 by two cousins, Aidan Murphy and Ronan Brennan, and the name of the brewery and its first beer were decided by an online competition to choose a name.

Galway Hooker Brewery coined the beer name "Irish Pale Ale" in 2006 and Galway Hooker Irish Pale Ale is the brewery's flagship product. It is brewed in 650 litre batches. The beer is similar to traditional Pale Ales such as that brewed by the Sierra Nevada Brewing Company in the US, but it has an added taste of caramel similar to an Irish red beer. It is made from mainly pearl and crystal malt and Saaz and Cascade hops. It has a bitterness of 35 IBUs and is 4.3% alcohol by volume.

The beer is available kegged on draught and is available in pubs throughout Galway, Dublin, Cork and Roscommon and other towns across Ireland.

The brewery's bottle range was expanded in 2014 and includes Galway Hooker Irish Stout, Galway Hooker Amber Lager and Galway Hooker Sixty Knots IPA (6.5%) which are available throughout the country in independent off-licences, local supermarkets, restaurants and hotels. Galway Hooker Irish Stout, Amber Lager and Sixty Knots IPA are also available in a limited supply on draught. It also produces a number of specials from time-to time which have been available in Galway City including a dark wheat beer and a pilsner. The brewery has also brewed some festival beer specials including an Irish Coffee Porter, a Weissbier and a dry hopped IPA.

== Brewery ==
Galway Hooker was previously brewed on the site of the defunct Emerald Brewery just outside Roscommon town. Galway Hooker bought the building and equipment previously used by Emerald.

In May 2014, the company moved location and installed a new state-of-the art brewery in Oranmore, County Galway.

The brewery regularly attends beer festivals in Ireland such as the annual Irish Craft Beer and Cider Festival in the RDS, Dublin.

The company is a member of the Independent Craft Brewers of Ireland association and the Irish beer consumer group Beoir.

== Awards ==
- 2007 - Named "Best in Ireland" by the Bridgestone Irish Food Guide
- 2007 - Winner in the Irish Craft Brewers Award for Best Beer
- 2009 - Winner in the Irish Craft Brewers Award for Beer of the Year
- 2010 - Runner-Up in the Irish Craft Brewers Award for Beer of the Year
- 2014 - Winner of Gold (beer category) in the Blas na hÉireann / The Irish Food Awards for Galway Hooker Irish Pale Ale (bottle)
- 2015 - Winner of Gold - Galway Hooker Irish Stout (stout category) in the Blas na hÉireann / The Irish Food Awards (bottle)
- 2015 - Winner of Silver - Galway Hooker Irish Dark Lager (lager category) in the Blas na hÉireann / The Irish Food Awards
- 2015 - Winner of "Best in County" awarded by Galway Enterprise Board as part of the Blas na hÉireann / The Irish Food Awards
- 2016 - Winner of Gold - Galway Hooker Amber Lager (lager category) in the Blas na hÉireann / The Irish Food Awards
- 2016 - Winner of Silver - Galway Hooker Irish Stout (stout category) in the Blas na hÉireann / The Irish Food Awards
